= Diving at the 2016 Summer Olympics – Qualification =

This article details the qualifying phase for diving at the 2016 Summer Olympics. The competition at these Games will comprise a total of 136 athletes coming from the different nations; each has been allowed to enter not more than 16 divers (up to eight males and eight females) with only two in individual events and a pair in synchronized events.

== Summary ==
For individual diving, the top twelve from the 2015 World Championships, the five continental champions and the eighteen semifinalists at the 2016 Diving World Cup will achieve a quota spot. For the pairs events, the top three from the world championships, the top four from the world cup and the hosts qualify.

Nation	Synchronized diving				Individual diving				Total	
Nation	Men's 3 m	Men's 10 m	Women's 3 m	Women's 10 m	Men's 3 m	Men's 10 m	Women's 3 m	Women's 10 m	Quotas	Athletes
Australia			X		2	2	2	2	9	9
Austria					1				1	1
Belarus						2			2	2
Brazil	X	X	X	X	1	1	1	1	8	9
Canada			X	X	1	2	2	2	9	7
China	X	X	X	X	2	2	2	2	12	13
Colombia					1	2	1		4	4
Croatia							1		1	1
Egypt					1	1	1	1	4	4
France					1	1		1	3	3
Germany	X	X	X		2	2	2	2	11	8
Great Britain	X	X	X	X	2	1	2	2	11	11
Hungary								1	1	1
Ireland					1				1	1
Italy	X		X		2	1	2	1	8	8
Jamaica					1				1	1
Japan					2			1	3	3
Malaysia			X	X	1	1	2	2	8	6
Mexico	X	X		X	2	2	2	2	11	9
Netherlands							1		1	1
New Zealand							1		1	1
North Korea				X				2	3	3
Puerto Rico						1			1	1
Russia	X	X			2	2	2	2	10	8
South Africa							1		1	1
South Korea					1	1			2	1
Ukraine		X			1		2	2	6	7
United States	X	X		X	2	2	2	2	11	10
Venezuela						2			2	2
Total: 29 NOCs	8	8	8	8	29	28	29	28	146	136

FINA final list - 10 July 2016

== Timeline ==
Event	Date	Venue
2015 European Diving Championships	June 9–14, 2015	(Germany) Rostock
2015 Pan American Games	July 10–13, 2015	(Canada) Toronto
2015 World Aquatics Championships	July 24 – August 9, 2015	(Russia) Kazan
2015 Asian Diving Cup	September 4–6, 2015	(Malaysia) Kuala Lumpur
Oceania Championships	December 12–13, 2015	(Australia) Melbourne
2016 FINA Diving World Cup	February 19–24, 2016	(Brazil) Rio de Janeiro
Re-allocation of unused quota	June 16–24, 2016	—

== Synchronized diving ==
=== Men's 3 m synchronized springboard ===
Competition	Places	Qualified teams
FINA World Championships	3	China; Russia; Great Britain
FINA Diving World Cup	4	Germany; Mexico; Italy; United States
Host nation	1	Brazil
Total	8	

=== Men's 10 m synchronized platform ===
Competition	Places	Qualified teams
FINA World Championships	3	China; Mexico; Russia
FINA Diving World Cup	4	Germany; Great Britain; United States; Ukraine
Host nation	1	Brazil
Total	8	

=== Women's 3 m synchronized springboard ===
Competition	Places	Qualified teams
FINA World Championships	3	China; Canada; Australia
FINA Diving World Cup	4	Italy; Malaysia; Great Britain; Germany
Host nation	1	Brazil
Total	8	

=== Women's 10 m synchronized platform ===
Competition	Places	Qualified teams
FINA World Championships	3	China; Canada; North Korea
FINA Diving World Cup	4	Malaysia; Great Britain; United States; Mexico
Host nation	1	Brazil
Total	8	

== Individual diving ==
=== Men's 3 m springboard ===
For the individual events, any one diver can only gain 1 quota place per event for their NOC.

Competition	Places	Qualified divers
FINA World Championships	12	China (Cao Yuan); China (He Chao); Russia (Ilya Zakharov); Russia (Evgeny Kuznetsov); Great Britain (Jack Laugher); France (Matthieu Rosset); Mexico (Rommel Pacheco); Germany (Patrick Hausding); Ukraine (Illya Kvasha); Japan (Ken Terauchi); Australia (Kevin Chavez); South Korea (Woo Ha-ram)
2015 European Diving Championships	1	not allocated – Matthieu Rosset qualified above
Oceania Qualifying	1	Australia (Grant Nel)
African Qualifying	1	Egypt (Youssef Selim)
2015 Asian Diving Cup	1	Malaysia (Ahmad Azman)
2015 Pan American Games	1	not allocated – Rommel Pacheco qualified above
FINA Diving World Cup	Up to 18	Italy (Andrea Chiarabini); Italy (Michele Benedetti); United States (Michael Hixon); Colombia (Sebastián Morales); Ireland (Oliver Dingley); Japan (Sho Sakai); Mexico (Rodrigo Diego López); United States (Kristian Ipsen); Canada (Philippe Gagné); Brazil (César Castro); Jamaica (Yona Knight-Wisdom); Great Britain (Freddie Woodward)
Re-allocation of unused quota	2	Germany (Stephan Feck); Austria (Constantin Blaha)
Total	29	

=== Men's 10 m platform ===
For the individual events, any one diver can only gain 1 quota place per event for their NOC.

Competition	Places	Qualified divers
FINA World Championships	12	China (Qiu Bo); China (Chen Aisen); Great Britain (Tom Daley); Russia (Victor Minibaev); United States (David Boudia); Mexico (Iván García); Germany (Sascha Klein); Australia (Domonic Bedggood); Russia (Nikita Shleikher); Mexico (German Sanchez); France (Benjamin Auffret); Belarus (Vadim Kaptur)
2015 European Diving Championships	1	Germany (Martin Wolfram)
Oceania Qualifying	1	Australia (James Connor)
African Qualifying	1	Egypt (Mohab El-Kordy)
2015 Asian Diving Cup	1	Malaysia (Ooi Tze Liang)
2015 Pan American Games	1	not allocated – Mexico already qualified 2 divers
FINA Diving World Cup	Up to 18	Canada (Maxim Bouchard); United States (Steele Johnson); Venezuela (Jesús Liranzo); Colombia (Victor Ortega); Venezuela (Robert Páez); Brazil (Hugo Parisi); Puerto Rico (Rafael Quintero); Colombia (Sebastián Villa); South Korea (Woo Ha-ram)
Re-allocation of unused quota	3	Italy (Maicol Verzotto); Canada (Vincent Riendeau); Belarus (Yauheni Karaliou)
Total	28	

=== Women's 3 m springboard ===
For the individual events, any one diver can only gain 1 quota place per event for their NOC.

Competition	Places	Qualified divers
FINA World Championships	12	China (Shi Tingmao); China (He Zi); Canada (Jennifer Abel); Australia (Esther Qin); Italy (Tania Cagnotto); Canada (Pamela Ware); Australia (Maddison Keeney); Great Britain (Rebecca Gallantree); Netherlands (Uschi Freitag); Ukraine (Anastasiya Nedobiga); Ukraine (Olena Fedorova); Malaysia (Ng Yan Yee)
2015 European Diving Championships	1	not allocated – Tania Cagnotto qualified above
Oceania Qualifying	1	not allocated – Australia already qualified 2 divers
African Qualifying	1	not allocated – NOC rejected^{[1]}
2015 Asian Diving Cup	1	not allocated – China already qualified 2 divers
2015 Pan American Games	1	not allocated – Jennifer Abel qualified above
FINA Diving World Cup	Up to 18	Italy (Maria Marconi); Mexico (Dolores Hernandez); Malaysia (Cheong Jun Hoong); Brazil (Juliana Veloso); United States (Kassidy Cook); Germany (Tina Punzel); Great Britain (Grace Reid); Mexico (Melany Hernandez); Russia (Kristina Ilinykh)
Re-allocation of unused quota	8	Germany (Nora Subschinski); United States (Abigail Johnston); Colombia (Diana Pineda); Russia (Nadezhda Bazhina); Egypt (Maha Amer); New Zealand (Elizabeth Cui); South Africa (Julia Vincent); Croatia (Marcela Marić)
Total	29	

1. South Africa was awarded a quota place through the continental qualifier, but later declined, as SASCOC made an agreement on the Rio 2016 Olympics qualification criteria that the Continental Qualification route would not be considered.

=== Women's 10 m platform ===
For the individual events, any one diver can only gain 1 quota place per event for their NOC.

Competition	Places	Qualified divers
FINA World Championships	12	China (Ren Qian); China (Si Yajie); North Korea (Kim Kuk-hyang); France (Laura Marino); North Korea (Kim Un-hyang); United States (Jessica Parratto); Great Britain (Tonia Couch); Malaysia (Pandelela Rinong); Ukraine (Iuliia Prokopchuk); Italy (Noemi Bátki); Australia (Melissa Wu); Canada (Meaghan Benfeito)
2015 European Diving Championships	1	not allocated – Iuliia Prokopchuk qualified above
Oceania Qualifying	1	Australia (Brittany Broben)
African Qualifying	1	Egypt (Maha Gouda)
2015 Asian Diving Cup	1	Malaysia (Nur Dhabitah Sabri)
2015 Pan American Games	1	Mexico (Paola Espinosa)
FINA Diving World Cup	Up to 18	Great Britain (Sarah Barrow); United States (Katrina Young); Mexico (Alejandra Orozco); Japan (Minami Itahashi); Germany (Maria Kurjo); Russia (Ekaterina Petukhova); Canada (Roseline Filion)
Re-allocation of unused quota	5	Ukraine (Ganna Krasnoshlyk); Germany (Elena Wassen); Hungary (Villő Kormos); Brazil (Ingrid Oliveira); Russia (Yulia Timoshinina)
Total	28	
