= Diving at the 2016 European Aquatics Championships – Women's 10 m platform =

Women's 10 m platform at the 2016 European Aquatics Championships
- Dates: 13 May
- Competitors: 20 from 13 nations
- Winning points: 385.90

Medalists
gold medal	Yulia Prokopchuk	Ukraine
silver medal	Tonia Couch	Great Britain
bronze medal	Georgia Ward	Great Britain

The Women's 10 m platform competition of the 2016 European Aquatics Championships was held on 13 May 2016.

== Results ==
The preliminary round was held at 12:30. The final was held at 19:30.

Green denotes finalists

Rank	Diver	Nationality	Preliminary		Final	
Rank	Diver	Nationality	Points	Rank	Points	Rank
1st place, gold medalist(s)	Yulia Prokopchuk	Ukraine	344.35	2	385.90	1
2nd place, silver medalist(s)	Tonia Couch	Great Britain	345.20	1	352.70	2
3rd place, bronze medalist(s)	Georgia Ward	Great Britain	278.15	7	325.05	3
4	Ekaterina Petukhova	Russia	286.35	5	316.05	4
5	Laura Marino	France	271.50	11	314.55	5
6	Christina Wassen	Germany	302.30	3	310.75	6
7	Noemi Batki	Italy	284.00	6	308.40	7
8	Maria Kurjo	Germany	294.55	4	294.85	8
9	Celine van Duijn	Netherlands	274.25	9	292.25	9
10	Hanna Krasnoshlyk	Ukraine	278.10	8	284.30	10
11	Alais Kaljoni	France	270.85	12	279.30	11
12	Genevieve Green	Lithuania	273.15	10	152.65	12
13	Yulia Timoshinina	Russia	262.70	13		
14	Mara Aiacoboae	Romania	262.20	14		
15	Villő Kormos	Hungary	253.10	15		
16	Ellen Ek	Sweden	238.20	16		
17	Krystsina Sheshka	Belarus	220.80	17		
18	Zsófia Reisinger	Hungary	207.80	18		
19	Anne Tuxen	Norway	203.75	19		
20	Isabelle Svantesson	Sweden	198.35	20		
