= 2016 FINA Diving World Series =

International diving competition series

The 2016 FINA Diving World Series was the eighth edition of FINA Diving World Series. The series consisted of four legs: the first leg in Beijing, China; the second leg in Dubai, United Arab Emirates; the third leg in Windsor, Canada; and the fourth leg in Kazan, Russia.

== Overall medal tally ==
| Rank | Nation | Gold | Silver | Bronze | Total |
|---|---|---|---|---|---|
| 1 | China (CHN) | 38 | 11 | 4 | 53 |
| 2 | Canada (CAN) | 1 | 9 | 7 | 17 |
| 3 | Russia (RUS) | 1 | 2 | 8 | 11 |
| 4 | Great Britain (GBR) | 0 | 6 | 6 | 12 |
| 5 | Ukraine (UKR) | 0 | 5 | 3 | 8 |
| 6 | Italy (ITA) | 0 | 4 | 1 | 5 |
| 7 | Australia (AUS) | 0 | 1 | 4 | 5 |
| 8 | Mexico (MEX) | 0 | 1 | 2 | 3 |
| 9 | France (FRA) | 0 | 1 | 0 | 1 |
| 10 | Malaysia (MAS) | 0 | 0 | 2 | 2 |
| 10 | United States (USA) | 0 | 0 | 2 | 2 |
| Totals (11 entries) | | 40 | 40 | 39 | 119 |

== Beijing leg ==
The results of the Beijing leg are given below.

=== Medal table ===
| Rank | Nation | Gold | Silver | Bronze | Total |
|---|---|---|---|---|---|
| 1 | China (CHN) | 10 | 4 | 0 | 14 |
| 2 | Ukraine (UKR) | 0 | 2 | 0 | 2 |
| 3 | Canada (CAN) | 0 | 1 | 2 | 3 |
| 3 | Russia (RUS) | 0 | 1 | 2 | 3 |
| 5 | Great Britain (GBR) | 0 | 1 | 1 | 2 |
| 6 | France (FRA) | 0 | 1 | 0 | 1 |
| 7 | Australia (AUS) | 0 | 0 | 1 | 1 |
| 7 | Italy (ITA) | 0 | 0 | 1 | 1 |
| 7 | Malaysia (MAS) | 0 | 0 | 1 | 1 |
| 7 | United States (USA) | 0 | 0 | 1 | 1 |
| Totals (10 entries) | | 10 | 10 | 9 | 29 |

=== Medal summary ===
==== Men ====
| Event | Gold | Silver | Bronze |
|---|---|---|---|
| 3 metre springboard | Cao Yuan (CHN) | He Chao (CHN) | Evgeni Kuznetsov (RUS) |
| 10 metre platform | Chen Aisen (CHN) | Qiu Bo (CHN) | Victor Minibaev (RUS) |
| Synchronized; 3 metre springboard | Cao Yuan (CHN); Qin Kai (CHN) | Evgeny Kuznetsov (RUS); Ilya Zakharov (RUS) | Kristian Ipsen (USA); Sam Dorman (USA) |
| Synchronized; 10 metre platform | Chen Aisen (CHN); Lin Yue (CHN) | Oleksandr Gorshkovozov (UKR); Maksym Dolgov (UKR) | Daniel Goodfellow (GBR); Tom Daley (GBR) |

==== Women ====
| Event | Gold | Silver | Bronze |
|---|---|---|---|
| 3 metre springboard | Shi Tingmao (CHN) | He Zi (CHN) | Pamela Ware (CAN) |
| 10 metre platform | Si Yajie (CHN) | Ren Qian (CHN) | Melissa Wu (AUS) |
| Synchronized; 3 metre springboard | He Zi (CHN); Wang Han (CHN) | Viktoriya Kesar (UKR); Anastasiia Nedobiga (UKR) | Francesca Dallape (ITA); Tania Cagnotto (ITA) |
| Synchronized; 10 metre platform | Liu Huixia (CHN); Si Yajie (CHN) | Lois Toulson (GBR); Tonia Couch (GBR) | Leong Mun Yee (MAS); Pandelela Rinong (MAS) |

==== Mixed ====
| Event | Gold | Silver | Bronze |
|---|---|---|---|
| Synchronized; 3 metre springboard | Yang Hao (CHN); Wang Han (CHN) | Jennifer Abel (CAN); François Imbeau-Dulac (CAN) | Maicol Verzotto (ITA); Tania Cagnotto (ITA) |
| Synchronized; 10 metre platform | Chang Yani (CHN); Tai Xiaohu (CHN) | Laura Marino (FRA); Benjamin Auffret (FRA) | Meaghan Benfeito (CAN); Vincent Riendeau (CAN) |

== Dubai leg ==
The results of the Dubai leg are given below.

=== Medal table ===
| Rank | Nation | Gold | Silver | Bronze | Total |
|---|---|---|---|---|---|
| 1 | China (CHN) | 10 | 3 | 1 | 14 |
| 2 | Canada (CAN) | 0 | 4 | 0 | 4 |
| 3 | Great Britain (GBR) | 0 | 1 | 2 | 3 |
| 4 | Ukraine (UKR) | 0 | 1 | 1 | 2 |
| 5 | Italy (ITA) | 0 | 1 | 0 | 1 |
| 6 | Russia (RUS) | 0 | 0 | 3 | 3 |
| 7 | Australia (AUS) | 0 | 0 | 1 | 1 |
| 7 | Mexico (MEX) | 0 | 0 | 1 | 1 |
| 7 | United States (USA) | 0 | 0 | 1 | 1 |
| Totals (9 entries) | | 10 | 10 | 10 | 30 |

=== Medal summary ===
==== Men ====
| Event | Gold | Silver | Bronze |
|---|---|---|---|
| 3 metre springboard | Cao Yuan (CHN) | He Chao (CHN) | Rommel Pacheco (MEX) |
| 10 metre platform | Yang Hao (CHN) | Chen Aisen (CHN) | Victor Minibaev (RUS) |
| Synchronized; 3 metre springboard | Cao Yuan (CHN); Qin Kai (CHN) | Oleksandr Gorshkovozov (UKR); Illya Kvasha (UKR) | Jack Laugher (GBR); Christopher Mears (GBR) |
| Synchronized; 10 metre platform | Chen Aisen (CHN); Lin Yue (CHN) | Daniel Goodfellow (GBR); Tom Daley (GBR) | David Boudia (USA); Steele Johnson (USA) |

==== Women ====
| Event | Gold | Silver | Bronze |
|---|---|---|---|
| 3 metre springboard | Shi Tingmao (CHN) | Jennifer Abel (CAN) | Wang Han (CHN) |
| 10 metre platform | Liu Huixia (CHN) | Si Yajie (CHN) | Melissa Wu (AUS) |
| Synchronized; 3 metre springboard | He Zi (CHN); Wang Han (CHN) | Francesca Dallape (ITA); Tania Cagnotto (ITA) | Viktoriya Kesar (UKR); Anastasiia Nedobiga (UKR) |
| Synchronized; 10 metre platform | Liu Huixia (CHN); Si Yajie (CHN) | Meaghan Benfeito (CAN); Roseline Filion (CAN) | Lois Toulson (GBR); Tonia Couch (GBR) |

==== Mixed ====
| Event | Gold | Silver | Bronze |
|---|---|---|---|
| Synchronized; 3 metre springboard | Yang Hao (CHN); Wang Han (CHN) | Jennifer Abel (CAN); François Imbeau-Dulac (CAN) | Kristina Ilinykh (RUS); Nikita Shleikher (RUS) |
| Synchronized; 10 metre platform | Chang Yani (CHN); Tai Xiaohu (CHN) | Meaghan Benfeito (CAN); Vincent Riendeau (CAN) | Yulia Timoshinina (RUS); Nikita Shleikher (RUS) |

== Windsor leg ==
The results of the Windsor leg are given below.

=== Medal table ===
| Rank | Nation | Gold | Silver | Bronze | Total |
|---|---|---|---|---|---|
| 1 | China (CHN) | 9 | 4 | 0 | 13 |
| 2 | Canada (CAN) | 1 | 3 | 4 | 8 |
| 3 | Great Britain (GBR) | 0 | 1 | 2 | 3 |
| 4 | Ukraine (UKR) | 0 | 1 | 1 | 2 |
| 5 | Italy (ITA) | 0 | 1 | 0 | 1 |
| 6 | Australia (AUS) | 0 | 0 | 1 | 1 |
| 6 | Mexico (MEX) | 0 | 0 | 1 | 1 |
| 6 | Russia (RUS) | 0 | 0 | 1 | 1 |
| Totals (8 entries) | | 10 | 10 | 10 | 30 |

=== Medal summary ===
==== Men ====
| Event | Gold | Silver | Bronze |
|---|---|---|---|
| 3 metre springboard | Cao Yuan (CHN) | He Chao (CHN) | Illya Kvasha (UKR) |
| 10 metre platform | Chen Aisen (CHN) | Qiu Bo (CHN) | Tom Daley (GBR) |
| Synchronized; 3 metre springboard | Cao Yuan (CHN); Qin Kai (CHN) | Oleksandr Gorshkovozov (UKR); Illya Kvasha (UKR) | Philippe Gagné (CAN); François Imbeau-Dulac (CAN) |
| Synchronized; 10 metre platform | Chen Aisen (CHN); Lin Yue (CHN) | Daniel Goodfellow (GBR); Tom Daley (GBR) | Victor Minibaev (RUS); Nikita Shleikher (RUS) |

==== Women ====
| Event | Gold | Silver | Bronze |
|---|---|---|---|
| 3 metre springboard | He Zi (CHN) | Shi Tingmao (CHN) | Jennifer Abel (CAN) |
| 10 metre platform | Ren Qian (CHN) | Roseline Filion (CAN) | Meaghan Benfeito (CAN) |
| Synchronized; 3 metre springboard | He Zi (CHN); Wang Han (CHN) | Francesca Dallape (ITA); Tania Cagnotto (ITA) | Jennifer Abel (CAN); Pamela Ware (CAN) |
| Synchronized; 10 metre platform | Chen Ruolin (CHN); Liu Huixia (CHN) | Meaghan Benfeito (CAN); Roseline Filion (CAN) | Lois Toulson (GBR); Tonia Couch (GBR) |

==== Mixed ====
| Event | Gold | Silver | Bronze |
|---|---|---|---|
| Synchronized; 3 metre springboard | Jennifer Abel (CAN); François Imbeau-Dulac (CAN) | Yang Hao (CHN); Wang Han (CHN) | Dolores Hernandez (MEX); Jahir Ocampo (MEX) |
| Synchronized; 10 metre platform | Chang Yani (CHN); Tai Xiaohu (CHN) | Meaghan Benfeito (CAN); Vincent Riendeau (CAN) | Melissa Wu (AUS); Domonic Bedggood (AUS) |

== Kazan leg ==
The results of the Kazan leg are given below.

=== Medal table ===
| Rank | Nation | Gold | Silver | Bronze | Total |
|---|---|---|---|---|---|
| 1 | China (CHN) | 9 | 0 | 3 | 12 |
| 2 | Russia (RUS) | 1 | 1 | 2 | 4 |
| 3 | Great Britain (GBR) | 0 | 3 | 1 | 4 |
| 4 | Italy (ITA) | 0 | 2 | 0 | 2 |
| 5 | Australia (AUS) | 0 | 1 | 1 | 2 |
| 5 | Canada (CAN) | 0 | 1 | 1 | 2 |
| 5 | Ukraine (UKR) | 0 | 1 | 1 | 2 |
| 8 | Mexico (MEX) | 0 | 1 | 0 | 1 |
| 9 | Malaysia (MAS) | 0 | 0 | 1 | 1 |
| Totals (9 entries) | | 10 | 10 | 10 | 30 |

=== Medal summary ===
==== Men ====
| Event | Gold | Silver | Bronze |
|---|---|---|---|
| 3 metre springboard | Cao Yuan (CHN) | Ilia Zakharov (RUS) | He Chao (CHN) |
| 10 metre platform | Chen Aisen (CHN) | Tom Daley (GBR) | Qiu Bo (CHN) |
| Synchronized; 3 metre springboard | Evgeny Kuznetsov (RUS); Ilya Zakharov (RUS) | Jack Laugher (GBR); Christopher Mears (GBR) | Oleksandr Gorshkovozov (UKR); Illya Kvasha (UKR) |
| Synchronized; 10 metre platform | Chen Aisen (CHN); Lin Yue (CHN) | Maksym Dolgov (UKR); Oleksandr Gorshkovozov (UKR) | Daniel Goodfellow (GBR); Tom Daley (GBR) |

==== Women ====
| Event | Gold | Silver | Bronze |
|---|---|---|---|
| 3 metre springboard | He Zi (CHN) | Tania Cagnotto (ITA) | Maddison Keeney (AUS) |
| 10 metre platform | Ren Qian (CHN) | Tonia Couch (GBR) | Si Yajie (CHN) |
| Synchronized; 3 metre springboard | He Zi (CHN); Wang Han (CHN) | Francesca Dallape (ITA); Tania Cagnotto (ITA) | Viktoriya Kesar (RUS); Anastasiia Nedobiga (RUS) |
| Synchronized; 10 metre platform | Chen Ruolin (CHN); Liu Huixia (CHN) | Meaghan Benfeito (CAN); Roseline Filion (CAN) | Leong Mun Yee (MAS); Pandelela Rinong (MAS) |

==== Mixed ====
| Event | Gold | Silver | Bronze |
|---|---|---|---|
| Synchronized; 3 metre springboard | Yang Hao (CHN); Wang Han (CHN) | Dolores Hernandez (MEX); Jahir Ocampo (MEX) | Jennifer Abel (CAN); François Imbeau-Dulac (CAN) |
| Synchronized; 10 metre platform | Chang Yani (CHN); Tai Xiaohu (CHN) | Melissa Wu (AUS); Domonic Bedggood (AUS) | Yulia Timoshinina (RUS); Nikita Shleikher (RUS) |
