= Diving at the 2014 European Aquatics Championships – Women's 10 m platform =

Women's 10 m platform at the Diving at the 2014 European Aquatics Championships
- Dates: 22 August
- Competitors: 11 from 8 nations
- Winning points: 363.70

Medalists
gold medal	Sarah Barrow	Great Britain
silver medal	Noemi Batki	Italy
bronze medal	Yulia Prokopchuk	Ukraine

The women's 10 m platform competition of the 2014 European Aquatics Championships was held on 22 August.

== Results ==
The preliminary round was held at 10:00 and the final at 14:00.

Green denotes finalists

Rank	Diver	Nationality	Preliminary		Final	
Rank	Diver	Nationality	Points	Rank	Points	Rank
1st place, gold medalist(s)	Sarah Barrow	Great Britain	310.70	3	363.70	1
2nd place, silver medalist(s)	Noemi Batki	Italy	275.70	9	346.40	2
3rd place, bronze medalist(s)	Yulia Prokopchuk	Ukraine	317.90	1	341.35	3
4	Laura Marino	France	282.45	8	338.00	4
5	Maria Kurjo	Germany	302.50	4	316.20	5
6	Yulia Timoshinina	Russia	313.45	2	304.45	6
7	Kieu Duong	Germany	283.30	7	301.90	7
8	Ekaterina Petukhova	Russia	293.95	6	297.80	8
9	Mara Aiacoboae	Romania	296.35	5	294.30	9
10	Villő Kormos	Hungary	243.90	11	278.05	10
11	Zsófia Reisinger	Hungary	243.90	10	249.00	11
