= 2017 European Diving Championships – Team event =

== Results ==
Rank	Diver	Nationality	Final	
Rank	Diver	Nationality	Points	Rank
1st place, gold medalist(s)	Laura Marino; Matthieu Rosset	France	372.40	1
2nd place, silver medalist(s)	Viktoriya Kesar; Oleksandr Gorshkovozov	Ukraine	366.55	2
3rd place, bronze medalist(s)	Nadezhda Bazhina; Viktor Minibaev	Russia	366.10	3
4	Alena Khamulkina; Vadim Kaptur	Belarus	355.70	4
5	Chiara Pellacani; Vladimir Barbu	Italy	354.00	5
6	Lois Toulson; Matthew Lee	United Kingdom	351.20	6
7	Celine van Duijn; Joey van Etten	Netherlands	317.40	7
8	Maria Kurjo; Patrick Hausding	Germany	289.20	8
9	Emma Gullstrand; Vinko Paradzik	Sweden	281.40	9
10	Anca Şerb; Aurelian Dragomir	Romania	250.30	10
