= 2015 European Diving Championships – Women's 10 metre platform =

The 2015 European Diving Championships was held from 9–14 June 2015 in Rostock, Germany. A total of eleven disciplines were contested.

== Medalists ==
The complete list of results and medals was published by the LEN (LIGUE EUROPÉENNE DE NATATION)

| Gold | Silver | Bronze |
|---|---|---|
| Yulia Prokopchuk; Ukraine | Laura Marino; France | Noemi Batki; Italy |

== Results ==
Green denotes finalists

| Rank | Diver | Nationality | Preliminary | | Final | |
| Rank | Diver | Nationality | Points | Rank | Points | Rank |
|---|---|---|---|---|---|---|
| 1st place, gold medalist(s) | Yulia Prokopchuk | Ukraine | 313,65 | 2 | 327,50 | 1 |
| 2nd place, silver medalist(s) | Laura Marino | France | 316,00 | 1 | 323,60 | 2 |
| 3rd place, bronze medalist(s) | Noemi Batki | Italy | 275,20 | 6 | 323,30 | 3 |
| 4 | Yulia Timoshinina | Russia | 261,50 | 8 | 322,20 | 4 |
| 5 | Daria Govor | Russia | 276,20 | 5 | 301,50 | 5 |
| 6 | Hanna Krasnoshlyk | Ukraine | 277,45 | 4 | 293,85 | 6 |
| 7 | Georgia Ward | United Kingdom | 287,20 | 3 | 284,80 | 7 |
| 8 | Mara Aiacoboae | Romania | 253,50 | 11 | 267,10 | 8 |
| 9 | Celine van Duijn | Netherlands | 258,90 | 9 | 265,05 | 9 |
| 10 | Villő Kormos | Hungary | 252,30 | 12 | 264,15 | 10 |
| 11 | Alais Kalonji | France | 254,00 | 10 | 257,50 | 11 |
| 12 | Maria Kurjo | Germany | 252,30 | 7 | 228,75 | 12 |
| 13 | Anne Vilde Tuxen | Norway | 252,30 | 12 | 222,50 | 13 |
| 14 | Lois Toulson | United Kingdom | 252,10 | 14 | | |
| 15 | Elena Wassen | Germany | 243,55 | 15 | | |
| 16 | Isabelle Svantesson | Sweden | 221,05 | 16 | | |

== See also ==
2015 European Diving Championships
