= 2017 European Diving Championships – Mixed 10 m platform synchro =

== Results ==
Rank	Diver	Nationality	Final	
Rank	Diver	Nationality	Points	Rank
1st place, gold medalist(s)	Lois Toulson; Matty Lee	Great Britain	308.16	1
2nd place, silver medalist(s)	Yulia Timoshinina; Viktor Minibaev	Russia	300.30	2
3rd place, bronze medalist(s)	Noemi Batki; Maicol Verzotto	Italy	299.58	3
4	Valeriia Liulko; Maksym Dolhov	Ukraine	297.60	4
5	Christina Wassen; Florian Fandler	Germany	292.92	5
6	Laura Marino; Alexis Jandard	France	254.28	6
7	Celine van Duijn; Pascal Faatz	Netherlands	251.94	7
