= Diving at the 2015 World Aquatics Championships – Team event =

Team event at the 2015 World Aquatics Championships
- Dates: 29 July
- Competitors: 28 from 14 nations
- Winning points: 343.65

Medalists
gold medal	Tom Daley; Rebecca Gallantree	Great Britain
silver medal	Oleksandr Horshkovozov; Yulia Prokopchuk	Ukraine
bronze medal	Chen Ruolin; Xie Siyi	China

The Team event competition of the diving events at the 2015 World Aquatics Championships was held on 29 July 2015.

The mixed team competition, introduced for the first time in this edition of the championships, must include five dives. A dive must be performed by the female or the male from the trampoline of 1m, from the trampoline of 3m and from the platform each. The other two dives must be performed as mixed dives synchronized by the 1m springboard and the 3m springboard.

== Results ==
The final was held at 19:30.

Rank	Nation	Divers	Points
1st place, gold medalist(s)	Great Britain	Tom Daley; Rebecca Gallantree	434.65
2nd place, silver medalist(s)	Ukraine	Oleksandr Horshkovozov; Yulia Prokopchuk	426.45
3rd place, bronze medalist(s)	China	Chen Ruolin; Xie Siyi	425.40
4	Russia	Nadezhda Bazhina; Viktor Minibaev	418.50
5	France	Laura Marino; Matthieu Rosset	417.20
6	Mexico	Arantxa Chávez; Iván García	399.40
7	United States	David Boudia; Jessica Parratto	395.40
8	Italy	Noemi Batki; Michele Benedetti	377.05
9	Malaysia	Chew Yiwei; Loh Loh Zhiayi	360.50
10	Belarus	Vadim Kaptur; Alena Khamulkina	352.00
11	Germany	Tina Punzel; Martin Wolfram	348.95
12	South Korea	Kim Na-mi; Woo Ha-ram	331.95
13	Romania	Mara Aiacoboae; Cătălin Cozma	318.95
14	Egypt	Maha Abdelsalam; Mohab El-Kordy	310.60
