= 2015 European Diving Championships – Women's synchronized 10 metre platform =

In the women's synchronized 10 metre platform event at the 2015 European Diving Championships, the winning pair were the Russians Yulia Timoshinina and Ekaterina Petukhova.

== Medalists ==
| Gold | Silver | Bronze |
|---|---|---|
| Yulia Timoshinina; Ekaterina Petukhova; Russia | Georgia Ward; Robyn Birch; United Kingdom | Villő Kormos; Zsófia Reisinger; Hungary |

== Results ==
Green denotes finalists

| Rank | Diver | Nationality | Preliminary | | Final | |
| Rank | Diver | Nationality | Points | Rank | Points | Rank |
|---|---|---|---|---|---|---|
| 1st place, gold medalist(s) | Yulia Timoshinina; Ekaterina Petukhova | Russia | 295,89 | 2 | 319,20 | 1 |
| 2nd place, silver medalist(s) | Georgia Ward; Robyn Birch | United Kingdom | 295,98 | 1 | 310,74 | 2 |
| 3rd place, bronze medalist(s) | Villő Kormos; Zsófia Reisinger | Hungary | 268,56 | 3 | 291,72 | 3 |
| 4 | My Phan; Maria Kurjo | Germany | 266,10 | 5 | 290,13 | 4 |
| 5 | Ganna Krasnoschlyk; Wlada Tazenko | Ukraine | 266,67 | 4 | 281,16 | 5 |
