= 2015 European Diving Championships – Team event =

Ten pairs of divers competed in the team event at the 2015 European Diving Championships. The team from Russia won the gold medal.

== Medalists ==
Gold	Silver	Bronze
Nadezhda Bazhina; Viktor Minibaev; Russia	Maria Kurjo; Patrick Hausding; Germany	Yulia Prokopchuk; Illya Kvasha; Ukraine

== Results ==
Rank	Diver	Nationality	Final	
Rank	Diver	Nationality	Points	Rank
1st place, gold medalist(s)	Nadezhda Bazhina; Viktor Minibaev	Russia	406,50	1
2nd place, silver medalist(s)	Maria Kurjo; Patrick Hausding	Germany	399,15	2
3rd place, bronze medalist(s)	Yulia Prokopchuk; Illya Kvasha	Ukraine	383,50	3
4	Laura Marino; Matthieu Rosset	France	369,10	4
5	Noemi Batki; Michele Benedetti	Italy	351,50	5
6	Mara Aiacoboae; Catalin Cozma	Romania	309,25	6
7	Isabelle Svantesson; Jesper Tolvers	Sweden	305,10	7
8	Georgia Ward; James Denny	United Kingdom	299,10	8
9	Celine van Duijn; Joey van Etten	Netherlands	290,35	9
10	Anne Vilde Tuxen; Daniel Jensen	Norway	274,35	10
