= 2015 European Diving Championships – Men's 10 metre platform =

In the men's 10 metre platform event at the 2015 European Diving Championships, the gold medal was won by Martin Wolfram from Germany.

== Medalists ==
Gold	Silver	Bronze
Martin Wolfram; Germany	Victor Minibaev; Russia	Vadim Kaptur; Belarus

== Results ==
Green denotes finalists

Rank	Diver	Nationality	Preliminary		Final	
Rank	Diver	Nationality	Points	Rank	Points	Rank
1st place, gold medalist(s)	Martin Wolfram	Germany	483.80	1	575.30	1
2nd place, silver medalist(s)	Victor Minibaev	Russia	471.20	2	541.70	2
3rd place, bronze medalist(s)	Vadim Kaptur	Belarus	463.40	3	491.55	3
4	Benjamin Auffert	France	416.95	6	478.20	4
5	Maksym Dolgov	Ukraine	441.15	5	454.85	5
6	Sergey Nazin	Russia	447.30	4	450.80	6
7	Matty Lee	United Kingdom	409.80	7	443.65	7
8	Jesper Tolvers	Sweden	388.85	10	421.90	8
9	Francesco Dell'uomo	Italy	397.15	8	418.05	9
10	Maicol Verzotto	Italy	371.05	11	394.20	10
11	Lev Sargsyan	Armenia	330.20	12	393.20	11
12	Dominik Stein	Germany	391.90	9	392.75	12
13	Daniel Janson	Norway	328.85	13		
14	Matthew Dixon	United Kingdom	315.30	14		
15	Lois Szymczak	France	315.00	15		
16	Vladimir Harutunyan	Armenia	307.70	16		
17	Catalin Constantin Cozma	Romania	288.95	17		
