= Diving at the 2016 European Aquatics Championships – Team event =

Team event at the 2016 European Aquatics Championships
- Dates: 9 May
- Competitors: 20 from 10 nations
- Teams: 10
- Winning points: 413.30

Medalists
gold medal	Nadezhda Bazhina; Viktor Minibaev	Russia
silver medal	Yulia Prokopchuk; Oleksandr Horshkovozov	Ukraine
bronze medal	Georgia Ward; Matty Lee	Great Britain

The Team event competition of the 2016 European Aquatics Championships was held on 9 May 2016.

== Results ==
The final was held at 19:30.

Rank	Diver	Nationality	
Rank	Diver	Nationality	Points
1st place, gold medalist(s)	Nadezhda Bazhina; Viktor Minibaev	Russia	413.30
2nd place, silver medalist(s)	Yulia Prokopchuk; Oleksandr Horshkovozov	Ukraine	396.40
3rd place, bronze medalist(s)	Georgia Ward; Matty Lee	Great Britain	353.85
4	Alena Khamulkina; Vadim Kaptur	Belarus	332.70
5	Laura Marino; Matthieu Rosset	France	329.85
6	Maria Kurjo; Patrick Hausding	Germany	328.70
7	Ellen Ek; Jesper Tolvers	Sweden	315.80
8	Noemi Batki; Michele Benedetti	Italy	302.85
9	Mara Aiacoboae; Alin Ronțu	Romania	288.45
10	Celine van Duijn; Joey van Etten	Netherlands	262.45
