= 2017 European Diving Championships =

Water sport competitions

- Host city: Kyiv
- Country: Ukraine
- Nations: 23
- Athletes: 128
- Events: 13
- Dates: 12–18 June 2017
- Main venue: Liko Sports Centre
- Website: http://divingkyiv2017.org/

The 2017 European Diving Championships was the fifth edition of the European Diving Championships and was held on 12–18 June 2017 in Kyiv, Ukraine.

== Schedule ==
All times are local (UTC+03:00).

Date	Time	Event	Type
12 June	16:30	Opening ceremony	
12 June	17:00	Team event	Final
13 June	10:00	10m platform women	Qualification
13 June	16:30	3m springboard synchro mixed	Final
13 June	18:00	10m platform women	Final
14 June	10:00	1m springboard men	Qualification
14 June	16:30	10m platform synchro women	Final
14 June	18:00	1m springboard men	Final
15 June	10:00	3m springboard women	Qualification
15 June	16:30	10m platform synchro men	Final
15 June	18:00	3m springboard women	Final
16 June	10:00	3m springboard men	Qualification
16 June	16:30	10m platform synchro mixed	Final
16 June	18:00	3m springboard men	Final
17 June	10:00	1m springboard women	Qualification
17 June	16:30	3m springboard synchro men	Final
17 June	18:00	1m springboard women	Final
18 June	10:00	10m platform men	Qualification
18 June	16:30	3m springboard synchro women	Final
18 June	18:00	10m platform men	Final

== Participating nations ==
- Armenia (3)
- Austria (2)
- Belarus (5)
- Bulgaria (2)
- Croatia (2)
- Finland (3)
- France (7)
- Georgia (3)
- Germany (12)
- Great Britain (12)
- Hungary (5)
- Ireland (2)
- Italy (10)
- Latvia (1)
- Lithuania (1)
- Netherlands (5)
- Poland (3)
- Romania (2)
- Russia (15)
- Spain (6)
- Sweden (6)
- Switzerland (7)
- Ukraine (12)

== Results ==
=== Medal table ===
Host nation

Rank	Nation	Gold	Silver	Bronze	Total
1	Russia (RUS)	3	6	2	11
2	Ukraine (UKR)*	3	4	3	10
3	Great Britain (GBR)	3	0	3	6
4	France (FRA)	2	0	1	3
4	Italy (ITA)	2	0	1	3
6	Germany (GER)	0	2	2	4
7	Switzerland (SUI)	0	1	0	1
8	Netherlands (NED)	0	0	1	1
Totals (8 entries)		13	13	13	39

=== Men ===
Event	Gold		Silver		Bronze	
1 m springboard	(Ukraine) Illya Kvasha	431.75	(Germany) Patrick Hausding	419.80	(France) Matthieu Rosset	412.95
3 m springboard	(Russia) Ilia Zakharov	525.10	(Ukraine) Illya Kvasha	484.30	(Ukraine) Oleg Kolodiy	470.30
10 m platform	(France) Benjamin Auffret	511.75	(Russia) Viktor Minibaev	493.25	(United Kingdom) Matty Lee	485.55
3 m synchro springboard	Russia; Ilia Zakharov; Evgeny Kuznetsov	427.71	Ukraine; Illya Kvasha; Oleg Kolodiy	426.96	Great Britain; Freddie Woodward; James Heatly	395.61
10 m synchro platform	Ukraine; Maksym Dolhov; Oleksandr Gorshkovozov	431.28	Russia; Nikita Shleikher; Aleksandr Belevtsev	406.56	Great Britain; Noah Williams; Matthew Dixon	388.05

=== Women ===
Event	Gold		Silver		Bronze	
1 m springboard	(Italy) Elena Bertocchi	282.80	(Russia) Nadezhda Bazhina	277.35	(Germany) Louisa Stawczynski	271.80
3 m springboard	(Ukraine) Hanna Pysmenska	303.30	(Switzerland) Michelle Heimberg	293.25	(Ukraine) Anastasiia Nedobiga	291.65
10 m platform	(United Kingdom) Lois Toulson	330.75	(Russia) Anna Chuinyshena	326.90	(Russia) Yulia Timoshinina	313.30
3 m synchro springboard	Russia; Nadezhda Bazhina; Kristina Ilinykh	304.80	Germany; Tina Punzel; Friederike Freyer	284.10	Netherlands; Inge Jansen; Daphne Wils	283.80
10 m synchro platform	Great Britain; Ruby Bower; Phoebe Banks	299.19	Russia; Yulia Timoshinina; Valeriia Belova	297.00	Ukraine; Valeriia Liulko; Sofiia Lyskun	288.96

=== Mixed ===
Event	Gold		Silver		Bronze	
Mixed 3 m springboard synchro	Italy; Elena Bertocchi; Maicol Verzotto	287.88	Ukraine; Viktoriya Kesar; Stanislav Oliferchyk	282.96	Germany; Tina Punzel; Lou Massenberg	281.40
Mixed 10 m platform synchro	Great Britain; Lois Toulson; Matty Lee	308.16	Russia; Yulia Timoshinina; Viktor Minibaev	300.30	Italy; Noemi Batki; Maicol Verzotto	299.58
Team event	France; Laura Marino; Matthieu Rosset	372.40	Ukraine; Viktoriya Kesar; Oleksandr Gorshkovozov	366.55	Russia; Nadezhda Bazhina; Viktor Minibaev	366.10

== Points table ==
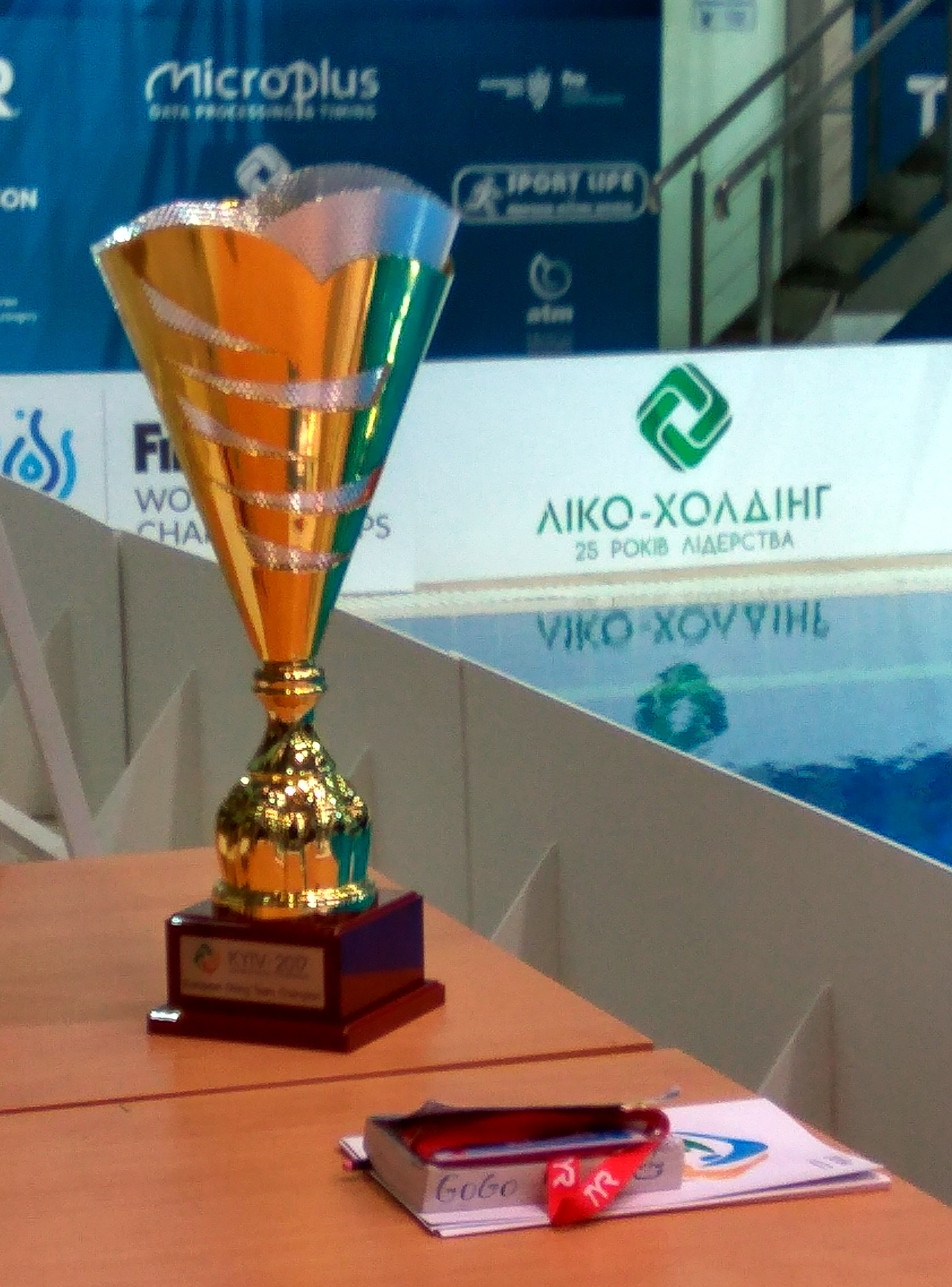
Trophy for the European diving champion

A country that receives the most total points during the event officially becomes the European diving champion. Ukraine won the trophy with 244 points.

No.	Country	Men	Women	Mixed	Total
1	Ukraine	100 (9)	82 (9)	62 (6)	244
2	Russia	83 (8)	99 (10)	60 (6)	242
3	Germany	60 (9)	79 (9)	46 (6)	185
4	Great Britain	71 (9)	61 (6)	40 (4)	172
5	Italy	43 (7)	38 (5)	62 (6)	143
6	France	38 (5)	5 (1)	40 (4)	83
7	Netherlands	0	53 (8)	24 (4)	77
8	Switzerland	21 (3)	29 (5)	16 (2)	66
9	Belarus	33 (7)	4 (1)	18 (2)	55
10	Sweden	0	18 (4)	22 (4)	40
11	Poland	17 (4)	4 (2)	0	21
12	Armenia	18 (3)	0	0	18
13	Spain	17 (4)	0	0	17
14	Hungary	0	14 (3)	0	14
15	Austria	8 (2)	0	0	8
16	Romania	0	0	6 (2)	6
17	Finland	0	5 (1)	0	5
18	Georgia	2 (2)	0	0	2

- The number of participants is shown in parentheses.
- The host is highlighted in blue.
