= Diving at the 2012 European Aquatics Championships – Women's 10 m platform =

The women's 10 m platform competition of the diving events at the 2012 European Aquatics Championships was held on May 16.

== Medalists ==
Gold	Silver	Bronze
Yulia Prokopchuk; Ukraine	Noemi Batki; Italy	Maria Kurjo; Germany

== Results ==
The preliminary round was held at 14:00 local time. The final was held at 19:30.

Green denotes finalists

Rank	Diver	Nationality	Preliminary		Final	
Rank	Diver	Nationality	Points	Rank	Points	Rank
1st place, gold medalist(s)	Yulia Prokopchuk	Ukraine	355.15	1	321.55	1
2nd place, silver medalist(s)	Noemi Batki	Italy	322.35	3	315.60	2
3rd place, bronze medalist(s)	Maria Kurjo	Germany	303.30	5	312.65	3
4	Nora Subschinski	Germany	322.45	2	301.70	4
5	Monique Gladding	Great Britain	320.85	4	300.70	5
6	Audrey Labeau	France	264.35	9	300.25	6
7	Natalia Goncharova	Russia	285.45	6	293.75	7
8	Stacie Powell	Great Britain	261.30	11	292.15	8
9	Laura Marino	France	273.95	8	275.50	9
10	Yulia Koltunova	Russia	284.50	7	274.65	10
11	Mara Elena Aiacoboae	Romania	263.70	10	272.70	11
12	Iira Laatunen	Finland	249.00	12	214.80	12
13	Brenda Spaziani	Italy	247.75	13		
14	Julia Lönnegren	Sweden	244.45	14		
15	Corina Popovici	Romania	236.20	15		
16	Villő Kormos	Hungary	223.90	16		
17	Ginni van Katwijk	Netherlands	210.75	17		
18	Zsófia Reisinger	Hungary	196.60	18		
