= Diving at the 2012 European Aquatics Championships – Women's 10 m synchro platform =

The women's 10 m platform synchro competition of the diving events at the 2012 European Aquatics Championships was held on May 17.

== Medalists ==
| Gold | Silver | Bronze |
|---|---|---|
| Tonia Couch; Sarah Barrow; Great Britain | Viktoriya Potyekhina; Yulia Prokopchuk; Ukraine | Nora Subschinski; Christin Steuer; Germany |

== Results ==
The preliminary round was held at 14:00 local time. The final was held at 19:30.

| Rank | Diver | Nationality | Preliminary | | Final | |
| Rank | Diver | Nationality | Points | Rank | Points | Rank |
|---|---|---|---|---|---|---|
| 1st place, gold medalist(s) | Tonia Couch; Sarah Barrow | Great Britain | 310.20 | 1 | 319.56 | 1 |
| 2nd place, silver medalist(s) | Viktoriya Potyekhina; Yulia Prokopchuk | Ukraine | 280.98 | 3 | 310.68 | 2 |
| 3rd place, bronze medalist(s) | Nora Subschinski; Christin Steuer | Germany | 293.34 | 2 | 303.93 | 3 |
| 4 | Audrey Labeau; Laura Marino | France | 278.85 | 4 | 290.31 | 4 |
| 5 | Yulia Koltunova; Ekaterina Petukhova | Russia | 277.92 | 5 | 288.54 | 5 |
| 6 | Zsófia Reisinger; Villő Kormos | Hungary | 257.67 | 6 | 260.16 | 6 |
