= Diving at the 2014 European Aquatics Championships – Team event =

Team event in diving at the 2014 European Aquatics Championships
- Dates: 18 August
- Competitors: 16 from 8 nations
- Winning time: 416.90

Medalists
gold medal	Viktor Minibaev; Nadezhda Bazhina	Russia
silver medal	Oleksandr Bondar; Yulia Prokopchuk	Ukraine
bronze medal	Sascha Klein; Tina Punzel	Germany

The team event competition of the 2014 European Aquatics Championships was held on 18 August.

== Results ==
The event was held at 14:30.

Rank	Diver	Nationality	Final	
Rank	Diver	Nationality	Points	Rank
1st place, gold medalist(s)	Viktor Minibaev; Nadezhda Bazhina	Russia	416.90	1
2nd place, silver medalist(s)	Oleksandr Bondar; Yulia Prokopchuk	Ukraine	409.75	2
3rd place, bronze medalist(s)	Sascha Klein; Tina Punzel	Germany	390.95	3
4	Matthieu Rosset; Laura Marino	France	374.85	4
5	Michele Benedetti; Noemi Batki	Italy	369.60	5
6	Vadim Kaptur; Alena Khamulkina	Belarus	335.50	6
7	Cătălin Cozma; Mara Aiacoboae	Romania	332.60	7
8	Johannes van Etten; Celine van Duijn	Netherlands	264.30	8
