= Diving at the 2016 European Aquatics Championships – Women's 10 m synchro platform =

Women's 10 m synchro platform at the 2016 European Aquatics Championships
- Dates: 10 May
- Competitors: 12 from 6 nations
- Teams: 6
- Winning points: 279.75

Medalists
| gold medal | Maria Kurjo; My Phan | Germany |
| silver medal | Hanna Krasnoshlyk; Vlada Tatsenko | Ukraine |
| bronze medal | Villő Kormos; Zsófia Reisinger | Hungary |

The Women's 10 m synchro platform competition of the 2016 European Aquatics Championships was held on 10 May 2016.

== Results ==
The final was held at 19:30.

| Rank | Divers | Nationality | |
| Rank | Divers | Nationality | Points |
|---|---|---|---|
| 1st place, gold medalist(s) | Maria Kurjo; My Phan | Germany | 279.75 |
| 2nd place, silver medalist(s) | Hanna Krasnoshlyk; Vlada Tatsenko | Ukraine | 278.01 |
| 3rd place, bronze medalist(s) | Villő Kormos; Zsófia Reisinger | Hungary | 274.74 |
| 4 | Yulia Timoshinina; Ekaterina Petukhova | Russia | 268.92 |
| 5 | Tonia Couch; Lois Toulson | Great Britain | 267.72 |
| 6 | Ellen Ek; Isabelle Svantesson | Sweden | 236.13 |
