= 2017 European Diving Championships – Men's 10 metre platform =

== Results ==
Green denotes finalists

Rank	Diver	Nationality	Preliminary		Final	
Rank	Diver	Nationality	Points	Rank	Points	Rank
1st place, gold medalist(s)	Benjamin Auffret	France	494.60	1	511.75	1
2nd place, silver medalist(s)	Viktor Minibaev	Russia	435.60	2	493.25	2
3rd place, bronze medalist(s)	Matthew Lee	United Kingdom	417.40	4	485.55	3
4	Maksym Dolgov	Ukraine	410.25	5	468.50	4
5	Vladimir Barbu	Italy	373.85	9	458.35	5
6	Matthew Dixon	United Kingdom	395.90	6	430.80	6
7	Roman Izmailov	Russia	423.60	3	425.60	7
8	Vadim Kaptur	Belarus	387.40	8	411.30	8
9	Vladimir Harutyunyan	Armenia	388.50	7	382.90	9
10	Mattia Placidi	Italy	371.95	10	377.70	10
11	Florian Fandler	Germany	357.00	12	361.85	11
12	Timo Barthel	Germany	370.35	11	355.55	12
13	Alexis Jandard	France	345.65	13		
14	Vinko Paradzik	Sweden	344.95	14		
15	Krisztian Somhegyi	Hungary	324.20	15		
16	Lev Sargsyan	Armenia	302.80	16		
17	Jan Wermelinger	Switzerland	299.30	17		
18	Dimitar Isaev	Bulgaria	294.70	18		
