= Diving at the 2018 European Aquatics Championships – Mixed 10 m platform synchro =

Mixed 10 m platform synchro at the 2018 European Aquatics Championships
- Venue: Royal Commonwealth Pool
- Dates: 11 August
- Competitors: 10 from 5 nations
- Teams: 5
- Winning points: 309.63

Medalists
gold medal	Nikita Shleikher; Yulia Timoshinina	Russia
silver medal	Matty Lee; Lois Toulson	Great Britain
bronze medal	Florian Fandler; Christina Wassen	Germany

The Mixed 10 m platform synchro competition of the 2018 European Aquatics Championships was held on 11 August 2018.

== Results ==
The final was started at 15:30.

Rank	Nation	Divers	Points					
Rank	Nation	Divers	T1	T2	T3	T4	T5	Total
1st place, gold medalist(s)	Russia	Nikita Shleikher; Yulia Timoshinina	49.20	49.20	62.10	74.25	74.88	309.63
2nd place, silver medalist(s)	Great Britain	Matty Lee; Lois Toulson	48.00	48.60	72.00	63.36	75.84	307.80
3rd place, bronze medalist(s)	Germany	Florian Fandler; Christina Wassen	43.80	48.00	72.96	48.60	65.28	278.64
4	Italy	Noemi Batki; Maicol Verzotto	49.20	46.80	59.40	61.44	58.56	275.40
5	Ukraine	Oleh Serbin; Valeriia Liulko	47.40	45.00	56.64	58.50	38.40	245.94
