= Robyn Birch =

British diver (born 1994)

Personal information
- Nationality: British
- Born: 10 January 1994 (age 32) Ashford, Surrey, England
- Height: 1.60 m (5 ft 3 in)
- Weight: 56 kg (123 lb)

Sport
- Sport: Diving
- Club: Dive London Aquatics
Medal record
Representing Great Britain
European Diving Championships
| Silver medal – second place | 2015 Rostok | 10 m synchro |
Representing England
| Bronze medal – third place | 2022 Birmingham | 10 m synchro |

Robyn Birch (born 10 January 1994) is a British diver. She has won a silver in synchronized 10 metre platform at the European Diving Championships.

== Career ==
Birch initially competed as a gymnast, and has competed in European and World Gymnastic Championships, but in 2011 she switched to diving.

She partnered with Georgia Ward in the 10m synchro event at the 2015 European Diving Championships held in Rostok, and won a silver. They also won a bronze in 10m synchro at the third FINA Diving Grand Prix event held in Gatineau, Canada that year.

Birch competed in the women's 10 metre platform event at the 2019 World Aquatics Championships held in Gwangju, South Korea. She finished fourth with Noah Williams in the mixed 10m platform synchro event.
