= 2019 European Diving Championships – Women's synchronized 10 metre platform =

Women's synchronized 10 metre platform event at the 2019 European Diving Championships was contested on 7 August.

== Results ==
Six pairs of athletes participated at the single-round event.

Rank	Divers	Nationality	D1	D2	D3	D4	D5	Total
1st place, gold medalist(s)	Noemi Batki; Chiara Pellacani	Italy	43.80	45.60	67.50	68.16	65.28	290.34
2nd place, silver medalist(s)	Phoebe Banks; Emily Martin	Great Britain	45.00	45.60	59.40	67.20	67.20	284.40
3rd place, bronze medalist(s)	Ekaterina Beliaeva; Yulia Timoshinina	Russia	45.60	48.00	44.10	70.08	69.12	277.50
4	Tina Punzel; Christina Wassen	Germany	44.40	43.20	57.60	56.70	70.08	271.98
5	Nicoleta Angelica Muscalu; Antonia Mihaela Pavel	Romania	40.80	41.40	54.60	58.50	62.40	257.70
6	Anne Vilde Tuxen; Helle Tuxen	Norway	43.20	37.20	56.55	53.76	51.03	241.74
