= 2015 European Diving Championships – Women's 1 metre springboard =

Results of a diving competition

In the 2015 European Diving Championships, the winner of the gold medal in the women's 1-metre springboard event was the Italian diver Tania Cagnotto.

== Medalists ==
Gold	Silver	Bronze
Tania Cagnotto; Italy	Nadezhda Bazhina; Russia	Olena Fedorova; Ukraine

== Results ==
Green denotes finalists

Rank	Diver	Nationality	Preliminary		Final	
Rank	Diver	Nationality	Points	Rank	Points	Rank
1st place, gold medalist(s)	Tania Cagnotto	Italy	274,35	2	291,20	1
2nd place, silver medalist(s)	Nadezhda Bazhina	Russia	274,90	1	279,40	2
3rd place, bronze medalist(s)	Olena Fedorova	Ukraine	264,70	3	275,40	3
4	Elena Bertocchi	Italy	225,65	8	267,80	4
5	Grace Reid	United Kingdom	257,45	4	264,50	5
6	Uschi Freitag	Netherlands	249,40	5	249,45	6
7	Jessica Favre	Switzerland	223,35	10	245,50	7
8	Daniella Nero	Sweden	222,05	11	243,45	8
9	Nora Subschinski	Germany	224,50	9	239,50	9
10	Hanna Pysmenska	Ukraine	247,05	6	235,10	10
11	Inge Jansen	Netherlands	219,70	12	230,75	11
12	Taina Karvonen	Finland	228,80	7	219,85	12
13	Rocio Velazquez Roldan	Spain	215,60	13		
14	Thelma Baatz Strandberg	Norway	214,60	14		
15	Iira Laatunen	Finland	212,25	15		
16	Louisa Stawczynski	Germany	210,30	16		
17	Vivian Barth	Switzerland	209,65	17		
18	Anca Șerb	Romania	200,00	18		
19	Gondos Flóra	Hungary	196,10	19		
20	Clara Della Vedova	France	194,10	20		
