= Diving at the 2016 European Aquatics Championships – Mixed 10 m platform synchro =

Mixed 10 m platform synchro at the 2016 European Aquatics Championships
- Dates: 14 May
- Competitors: 12 from 6 nations
- Teams: 6
- Winning points: 323.70

Medalists
gold medal	Yulia Prokopchuk; Maksym Dolhov	Ukraine
silver medal	Georgia Ward; Matty Lee	Great Britain
bronze medal	Yulia Timoshinina; Nikita Shleikher	Russia

The Mixed 10 m platform synchro competition of the 2016 European Aquatics Championships was held on 14 May 2016.

== Results ==
The final was held at 17:00.

Rank	Divers	Nation	
Rank	Divers	Nation	Points
1st place, gold medalist(s)	Yulia Prokopchuk; Maksym Dolhov	Ukraine	323.70
2nd place, silver medalist(s)	Georgia Ward; Matty Lee	Great Britain	318.24
3rd place, bronze medalist(s)	Yulia Timoshinina; Nikita Shleikher	Russia	307.68
4	Noemi Batki; Maicol Verzotto	Italy	304.62
5	Christina Wassen; Timo Barthel	Germany	277.14
6	Mara Aiacoboae; Alin Ioan Rontu	Romania	275.40
