= Oleh Kolodiy =

Ukrainian diver (born 1993)

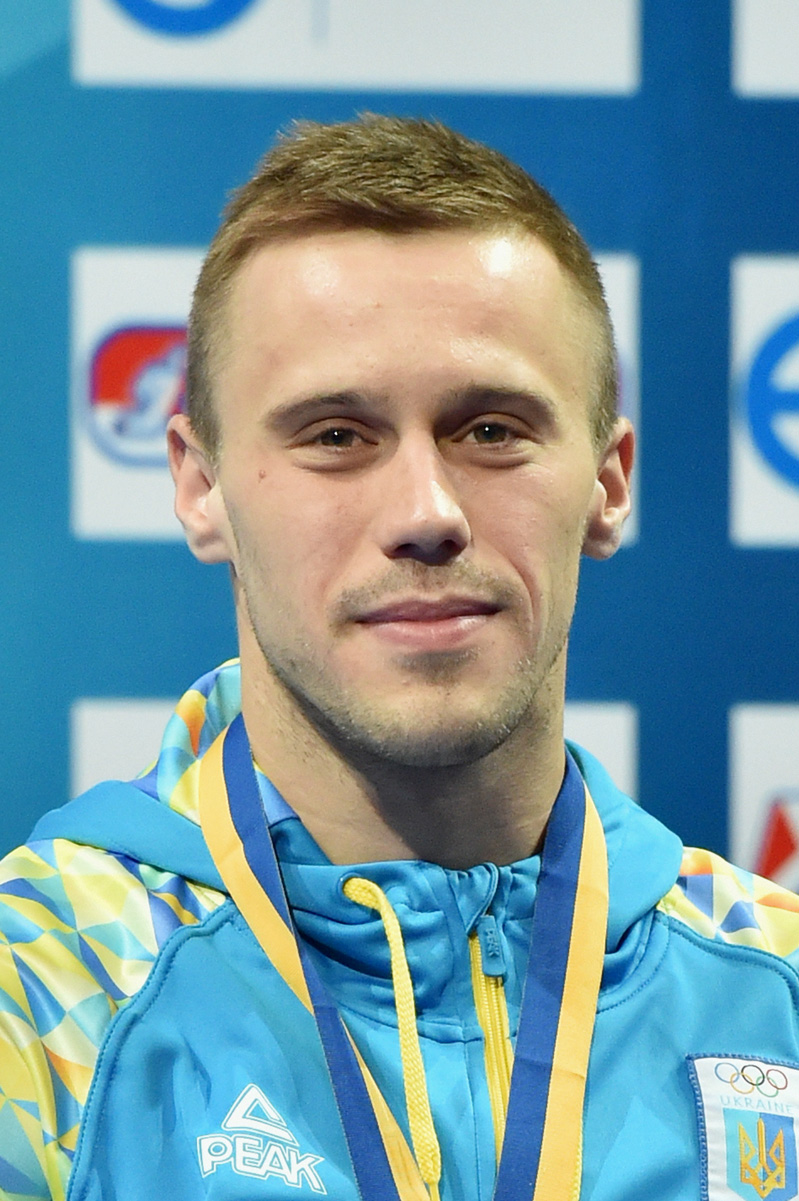
- Oleh Kolodiy at the 2017 European Diving Championships in Kyiv

Personal information
- Full name: Олег Едуардович Колодій
- Born: 16 March 1993 (age 33) Mykolaiv, Ukraine
- Height: 1.68 m (5 ft 6 in)

Sport
- Country: Ukraine
- Events: 1m, 3m, 3m synchro
- Partner: Illya Kvasha
Medal record
Men's diving
Representing Ukraine
Event	1st	2nd	3rd
World Championships	0	0	1
European Games	1	0	0
European Championships	1	0	2
European Diving Championships	1	2	3
World Cup	0	1	0
Military Games	0	1	1
World Junior Championships	0	0	1
European Junior Diving Championships	4	0	1
Total	7	4	9
World Championships
Bronze medal – third place	2017 Budapest	3 m synchro
European Games
Gold medal – first place	2023 Kraków–Małopolska	3 m synchro
European Championships
Gold medal – first place	2018 Glasgow	Team
Bronze medal – third place	2020 Budapest	3 m synchro
Bronze medal – third place	2022 Rome	3 m synchro
European Diving Championships
Gold medal – first place	2023 Rzeszów	3 m synchro
Silver medal – second place	2017 Kyiv	3 m synchro
Silver medal – second place	2019 Kyiv	1 m springboard
Bronze medal – third place	2013 Rostock	3 m synchro
Bronze medal – third place	2015 Rostock	1 m springboard
Bronze medal – third place	2017 Kyiv	3 m springboard
World Cup
Silver medal – second place	2018 Wuhan	Mixed team
Military Games
Silver medal – second place	2019 Wuhan	3 m synchro
Bronze medal – third place	2019 Wuhan	1 m springboard
World Junior Championships
Bronze medal – third place	2010 Tucson	3 m synchro
European Junior Diving Championships
Gold medal – first place	2008 Minsk	3 m springboard
Gold medal – first place	2010 Helsinki	3 m springboard
Gold medal – first place	2010 Helsinki	3 m synchro
Gold medal – first place	2011 Belgrade	3 m synchro
Bronze medal – third place	2011 Belgrade	1 m springboard

Oleh Kolodiy (Ukrainian: Олег Колодій; born 16 March 1993) is a Ukrainian diver.

== Career ==
He began diving at age 12 in Mykolaiv. His coach is Larisa Afanasyeva since then. He debuted internationally in 2012 at FINA Diving Grand Prix. He is also a multiple European championships medalist: in 2013 he won bronze in 3m synchro diving with Oleksandr Gorshkovozov and in 2015 he won bronze in 1m springboard. The 2017 European Diving Championships in home Kyiv was quite successful for Oleh where he won a silver in synchro diving with Illya Kvasha and a bronze in individual 3m springboard diving. Later that year Oleh won bronze medal in pair with Illya Kvasha at the World championships in 3m synchro. Up to date it is his best achievement in his sporting career.

He graduated from Mykolaiv National University where he studied mathematics. He received the Mykolaiv Citizen of the Year award in 2010 in the category of Sporting Hope of the Year. He holds the title of Master of Sport of International Class in Ukraine.
