= Diving at the 2012 European Aquatics Championships – Men's 10 m synchro platform =

The men's 10 m platform synchro competition of the diving events at the 2012 European Aquatics Championships was held on May 19, 2012.

== Medalists ==
Gold	Silver	Bronze
Sascha Klein; Patrick Hausding; Germany	Ilya Zakharov; Victor Minibaev; Russia	Oleksandr Bondar; Oleksandr Gorshkovozov

== Results ==
The preliminary round was held at 14:00 local time. The final was held at 19:30.

Rank	Diver	Nationality	Preliminary		Final	
Rank	Diver	Nationality	Points	Rank	Points	Rank
1st place, gold medalist(s)	Sascha Klein; Patrick Hausding	Germany	435.21	2	463.08	1
2nd place, silver medalist(s)	Ilya Zakharov; Victor Minibaev	Russia	437.01	1	458.07	2
3rd place, bronze medalist(s)	Oleksandr Bondar; Oleksandr Gorshkovozov	Ukraine	419.07	3	437.79	3
4	Timofei Hordeichik; Vadim Kaptur	Belarus	376.05	5	394.17	4
5	Jesper Tolvers; Christofer Eskilsson	Sweden	389.04	4	373.14	5
6	Francesco Dell'Uomo; Maicol Verzotto	Italy	371.70	6	371.28	6
