= Diving at the 2020 European Aquatics Championships – Team =

Team at the 2020 European Aquatics Championships
- Venue: Danube Arena
- Dates: 10 May 2021
- Competitors: 27 from 7 nations
- Teams: 7
- Winning points: 431.80

Medalists
gold medal	Kristina Ilinykh; Evgeny Kuznetsov; Ekaterina Beliaeva; Viktor Minibaev	Russia
silver medal	Chiara Pellacani; Andreas Sargent Larsen; Sarah Jodoin Di Maria; Riccardo Giovannini	Italy
bronze medal	Tina Punzel; Patrick Hausding; Christina Wassen; Lou Massenberg	Germany

The Team competition of the 2020 European Aquatics Championships was held on 10 May 2021.

== Results ==
The final started at 19:30.

Rank	Nation	Divers	Points						
Rank	Nation	Divers	T1	T2	T3	T4	T5	T6	Total
1st place, gold medalist(s)	Russia	Kristina Ilinykh; Evgeny Kuznetsov; Ekaterina Beliaeva; Viktor Minibaev	49.50	96.90	54.00	72.00	81.00	78.40	431.80
2nd place, silver medalist(s)	Italy	Chiara Pellacani; Andreas Sargent Larsen; Sarah Jodoin Di Maria; Riccardo Giovannini	63.00	80.50	64.50	65.60	88.80	65.60	428.00
3rd place, bronze medalist(s)	Germany	Tina Punzel; Patrick Hausding; Christina Wassen; Lou Massenberg	80.50	64.50	74.40	62.40	72.00	67.20	421.00
4	Great Britain	Yasmin Harper; Ross Haslam; Noah Williams; Eden Cheng	51.00	55.10	40.50	86.40	73.60	76.80	383.40
5	Ukraine	Anna Arnautova; Oleh Kolodiy; Kseniia Bailo; Oleksii Sereda	36.00	72.20	63.00	65.60	82.80	62.40	382.00
6	Hungary	Botond Bóta; Lilla Szabó-Seri; Patrícia Kun	74.80	26.60	48.00	37.80	35.15	35.65	258.00
7	Norway	Anne Tuxen; Axel Nyborg; Helle Tuxen; Caroline Kupka	52.65	46.50	51.80	22.40	33.25	30.40	237.00
