= Georgia Ward =

British diver (born 1995)

Personal information
- Born: 17 August 1995 (age 30) Uxbridge, United Kingdom

Sport
- Country: Great Britain
- Event: Diving
- Club: Dive London
- Coached by: Jane Figueiredo
Medal record
European Championships
Silver medal – second place	2015 Rostock	10 metre synchro
Silver medal – second place	2016 London	Mixed 10 m synchro
Bronze medal – third place	2016 London	10 m platform
Bronze medal – third place	2016 London	Team event

Georgia Ward (born 17 August 1995) is a British diver.

== Career ==
At the 2015 European Diving Championships, she competed in the Women's 10 m platform, in the Team event and won Silver in the 10 metre platform synchro with partner Robyn Birch.

At the 2016 European Aquatics Championships she won Silver in the Mixed 10 m platform synchro with partner Matty Lee. She also won two Bronze in the Women's 10 m platform and in the Team event with partner Matty Lee.

== Diving achievements ==
Competition	2012	2013	2014	2015	2016	2017
European Championship, 10 m platform				7th	3rd	
European Championship, 10 m platform synchro				2nd		
European Championship, Mixed 10 m platform synchro					2nd	
European Championship, Team event				8th	3rd	
World Junior Championship, Group A Platform	15th					
European Junior Championship, Group A 3m springboard	10th					
European Junior Championship, Group A Platform	7th	6th				
