= Diving at the 2016 European Aquatics Championships – Men's 10 m synchro platform =

Men's 10 m synchro platform at the 2016 European Aquatics Championships
- Dates: 12 May
- Competitors: 16 from 8 nations
- Teams: 8
- Winning points: 445.26

Medalists
gold medal	Sascha Klein; Patrick Hausding	Germany
silver medal	Tom Daley; Daniel Goodfellow	Great Britain
bronze medal	Oleksandr Horshkovozov; Maksym Dolgov	Ukraine

The Men's 10 m synchro platform competition of the 2016 European Aquatics Championships was held on 12 May 2016.

== Results ==
The final was held at 19:30.

Rank	Diver	Nationality	
Rank	Diver	Nationality	Points
1st place, gold medalist(s)	Sascha Klein; Patrick Hausding	Germany	445.26
2nd place, silver medalist(s)	Tom Daley; Daniel Goodfellow	Great Britain	444.30
3rd place, bronze medalist(s)	Oleksandr Horshkovozov; Maksym Dolhov	Ukraine	429.75
4	Viktor Minibaev; Roman Izmailov	Russia	426.51
5	Vadim Kaptur; Yauheni Karaliou	Belarus	395.28
6	Alexis Jandard; Loïs Szymczak	France	373.50
7	Andreas Larsen; Martin Christensen	Denmark	361.20
8	Mattia Placidi; Vladimir Barbu	Italy	326.73
