= Diving at the 2016 European Aquatics Championships – Men's 3 m synchro springboard =

Men's 3 m synchro springboard at the 2016 European Aquatics Championships
- Dates: 13 May
- Competitors: 14 from 7 nations
- Teams: 7
- Winning points: 456.81

Medalists
gold medal	Jack Laugher; Chris Mears	Great Britain
silver medal	Ilya Zakharov; Evgeny Kuznetsov	Russia
bronze medal	Illya Kvasha; Oleksandr Horshkovozov	Ukraine

The Men's 3 m synchro springboard competition of the 2016 European Aquatics Championships was held on 13 May 2016.

== Results ==
The final was held at 21:00.

Rank	Diver	Nationality	
Rank	Diver	Nationality	Points
1st place, gold medalist(s)	Jack Laugher; Chris Mears	Great Britain	456.81
2nd place, silver medalist(s)	Ilya Zakharov; Evgeny Kuznetsov	Russia	445.23
3rd place, bronze medalist(s)	Illya Kvasha; Oleksandr Horshkovozov	Ukraine	439.86
4	Andrzej Rzeszutek; Kacper Lesiak	Poland	381.45
5	Constantin Blaha; Fabian Brandl	Austria	365.85
6	Simon Rieckhoff; Jonathan Suckow	Switzerland	350.43
7	Yauheni Karaliou; Yury Naurozau	Belarus	346.02
