= Diving at the 2022 Commonwealth Games – Men's 10 metre platform =

Men's 10 metre platform at the 2022 Commonwealth Games
- Venue: Sandwell Aquatics Centre
- Date: 7 August
- Competitors: 14 from 7 nations
- Winning score: 501.30

Medalists
gold medal	Cassiel Rousseau	Australia
silver medal	Rylan Wiens	Canada
bronze medal	Matty Lee	England

The men's 10 metre platform is part of the Diving at the 2022 Commonwealth Games program. The competition will be held on 7 August 2022 at Sandwell Aquatics Centre in Birmingham.

== Format ==
The competition will be held in two rounds:

- Preliminary round: All divers perform six dives; the top 12 divers advance to the final.
- Final: The 12 divers perform six dives; the preliminary round scores are erased and the top three divers win the gold, silver and bronze medals accordingly.

== Schedule ==
All times are British Summer Time (UTC+1).

Date	Start	Round
Sunday 7 August 2022	10:05	Preliminary
Sunday 7 August 2022	17:35	Finals

== Results ==
Green denotes finalists

Rank	Diver	Preliminary		Final						
Rank	Diver	Points	Rank	Dive 1	Dive 2	Dive 3	Dive 4	Dive 5	Dive 6	Points
1st place, gold medalist(s)	Cassiel Rousseau (AUS)	466.90	1	76.80	81.00	83.30	84.60	72.00	103.60	501.30
2nd place, silver medalist(s)	Rylan Wiens (CAN)	404.00	4	84.80	90.65	64.60	64.80	90.75	97.20	492.80
3rd place, bronze medalist(s)	Matty Lee (ENG)	424.05	3	81.00	56.10	84.80	70.20	85.00	99.90	477.00
4	Nathan Zsombor-Murray (CAN)	395.70	7	68.80	66.60	77.55	76.80	76.50	81.60	447.85
5	Benjamin Tessier (CAN)	402.65	5	70.40	86.70	66.00	75.90	69.30	72.00	440.30
6	Bertrand Anak (MAS)	396.60	6	40.50	72.00	79.20	79.20	79.90	68.80	419.60
7	Noah Williams (ENG)	427.40	2	88.20	83.20	61.20	54.00	81.60	40.70	408.90
8	Aidan Heslop (WAL)	341.60	9	61.20	61.50	84.60	59.20	69.30	72.20	408.00
9	Nathan Brown (NZL)	368.60	8	67.65	69.00	62.40	66.30	64.35	67.65	397.35
10	Samuel Fricker (AUS)	301.60	13	68.80	70.50	40.80	74.25	70.40	65.60	390.35
11	Angus Menmuir (SCO)	341.55	10	57.60	43.20	54.00	66.70	74.20	58.50	354.20
12	Luke Sipkes (NZL)	311.15	12	63.00	33.60	56.00	38.40	34.65	53.65	279.30
13	Matthew Dixon (ENG)	316.20	11	WD						
14	Hanis Jaya Surya (MAS)	300.90	14	Did not advance						
