= 2017 European Diving Championships – Men's synchronized 10 metre platform =

== Results ==
| Rank | Diver | Nationality | Final | |
| Rank | Diver | Nationality | Points | Rank |
|---|---|---|---|---|
| 1st place, gold medalist(s) | Maksym Dolhov; Oleksandr Gorshkovozov | Ukraine | 431.28 | 1 |
| 2nd place, silver medalist(s) | Nikita Shleikher; Aleksandr Belevtsev | Russia | 406.56 | 2 |
| 3rd place, bronze medalist(s) | Noah Williams; Matthew Dixon | Great Britain | 388.05 | 3 |
| 4 | Vadim Kaptur; Artsiom Barouski | Belarus | 379.50 | 4 |
| 5 | Florian Fandler; Timo Barthel | Germany | 370.29 | 5 |
| 6 | Vladimir Harutyunyan; Azat Harutyunyan | Armenia | 368.76 | 6 |
