= 2017 European Diving Championships – Men's 3 metre springboard =

== Results ==
Green denotes finalists

Rank	Diver	Nationality	Preliminary		Final	
Rank	Diver	Nationality	Points	Rank	Points	Rank
1st place, gold medalist(s)	Ilya Zakharov	Russia	432.35	1	525.10	1
2nd place, silver medalist(s)	Illya Kvasha	Ukraine	431.90	2	484.30	2
3rd place, bronze medalist(s)	Oleg Kolodiy	Ukraine	364.70	12	470.30	3
4	Matthieu Rosset	France	396.85	4	455.55	4
5	Ross Haslam	Great Britain	391.35	5	429.65	5
6	Giovanni Tocci	Italy	372.95	9	418.80	6
7	Stephan Feck	Germany	402.45	3	404.95	7
8	Nicolás García Boissier	Spain	374.85	7	396.45	8
9	James Heatly	Great Britain	371.25	10	395.60	9
10	Yauheni Karaliou	Belarus	380.30	6	370.95	10
11	Alberto Arévalo Alcón	Spain	369.35	11	349.55	11
12	Kacper Lesiak	Poland	373.35	8	339.50	12
13	Evgeny Kuznetsov	Russia	363.90	13		
14	Patrick Hausding	Germany	356.25	14		
15	Jonathan Suckow	Switzerland	355.95	15		
16	Jouni Kallunki	Finland	355.25	16		
17	Mikita Tkachou	Belarus	352.90	17		
18	Guillaume Dutoit	Switzerland	349.35	18		
19	Gwendal Bisch	France	347.75	19		
20	Andrzej Rzeszutek	Poland	346.70	20		
21	Constantin Blaha	Austria	340.55	21		
22	Juho Junttila	Finland	323.75	22		
23	Botond Bóta	Hungary	323.35	23		
24	Jack Ffrench	Ireland	307.50	24		
25	Alexander Kostov	Bulgaria	299.50	25		
26	Nikita Kozlovskis	Latvia	291.90	26		
27	Sandro Melikidze	Georgia	284.70	27		
28	Joey van Etten	Netherlands	280.40	28		
29	Adriano Ruslan Cristofori	Italy	268.50	29		
30	Fabian Brandl	Austria	264.75	30		
31	Ábel Ligárt	Hungary	232.90	31		
