= Diving at the 2020 European Aquatics Championships – Men's 3 m synchro springboard =

Men's 3 m springboard synchro at the 2020 European Aquatics Championships
- Venue: Danube Arena
- Dates: 13 May 2021
- Competitors: 20 from 10 nations
- Teams: 10
- Winning points: 426.78

Medalists
gold medal	Patrick Hausding; Lars Rüdiger	Germany
silver medal	Evgeny Kuznetsov; Nikita Shleikher	Russia
bronze medal	Oleksandr Horshkovozov; Oleh Kolodiy	Ukraine

The Men's 3 m synchro springboard competition of the 2020 European Aquatics Championships was held on 13 May 2021.

== Results ==
The final was started at 19:30.

Rank	Nation	Divers	Points						
Rank	Nation	Divers	T1	T2	T3	T4	T5	T6	Total
1st place, gold medalist(s)	Germany	Patrick Hausding; Lars Rüdiger	51.60	52.80	84.66	79.80	86.10	71.82	426.78
2nd place, silver medalist(s)	Russia	Evgeny Kuznetsov; Nikita Shleikher	50.40	50.40	78.54	75.48	80.85	79.80	415.47
3rd place, bronze medalist(s)	Ukraine	Oleksandr Horshkovozov; Oleh Kolodiy	50.40	48.00	73.44	72.54	90.06	75.48	409.92
4	Italy	Lorenzo Marsaglia; Giovanni Tocci	47.40	49.20	68.82	82.62	68.40	70.38	386.82
5	Poland	Kacper Lesiak; Andrzej Rzeszutek	46.80	48.00	67.89	71.40	68.34	61.56	363.99
6	Great Britain	Daniel Goodfellow; Jack Laugher	50.40	51.60	80.58	45.15	62.70	70.20	360.63
7	Austria	Alexander Hart; Nikolaj Schaller	46.20	45.60	64.80	58.50	66.96	70.38	352.44
8	Greece	Athanasios Tsirikos; Nikolaos Molvalis	46.20	46.80	63.00	61.20	64.17	64.80	346.17
9	Georgia	Sandro Melikidze; Tornike Onikashvili	44.40	46.20	60.30	62.31	61.20	62.22	336.63
10	Netherlands	Pascal Faatz; Bram Meulendijks	46.20	44.40	54.00	53.94	53.10	59.40	311.04
