= Diving at the 2014 European Aquatics Championships – Women's 10 m synchro platform =

Women's 10 m synchro platform at the Diving at the 2014 European Aquatics Championships
- Dates: 19 August
- Competitors: 6 from 3 nations
- Winning points: 314.70

Medalists
gold medal	Ekaterina Petukhova; Yulia Timoshinina	Russia
silver medal	Maria Kurjo; My Phan	Germany
bronze medal	Villő Kormos; Zsófia Reisinger	Hungary

The Women's 10 m synchro platform competition of the 2014 European Aquatics Championships were held on 19 August.

== Results ==
The preliminary round was held at 12:00 and the final at 16:00.

Rank	Divers	Nationality	Preliminary		Final	
Rank	Divers	Nationality	Points	Rank	Points	Rank
1st place, gold medalist(s)	Ekaterina Petukhova; Yulia Timoshinina	Russia	303.39	2	314.70	1
2nd place, silver medalist(s)	Maria Kurjo; My Phan	Germany	305.67	1	290.01	2
3rd place, bronze medalist(s)	Villő Kormos; Zsófia Reisinger	Hungary	280.68	3	279.48	3
