= 2015 European Diving Championships =

Water sport competitions

- Host city: Rostock
- Country: Germany
- Events: 11
- Dates: 9–14 June
- Website: Website

The 2015 European Diving Championships was the fourth edition of the European Diving Championships and was held from 9–14 June 2015 in Rostock, Germany. A total of eleven disciplines were contested.

== Results ==
The complete list of results and medals was published by the LEN (LIGUE EUROPÉENNE DE NATATION)

=== Medal table ===
Rank	Nation	Gold	Silver	Bronze	Total
1	Russia	3	6	2	11
2	Italy	3	0	1	4
3	Germany	2	2	2	6
4	France	2	1	0	3
5	Ukraine	1	1	4	6
6	Great Britain	0	1	0	1
7	Belarus	0	0	1	1
7	Hungary	0	0	1	1
Totals (8 entries)		11	11	11	33

=== Men ===
Event	Gold		Silver		Bronze	
1 m springboard	Matthieu Rosset; France	433.80	Evgenii Novoselov; Russia	396.05	Oleg Kolodiy; Ukraine	391.10
3 m springboard	Matthieu Rosset; France	476.70	Evgeny Kuznetsov; Russia	467.60	Ilya Zakharov; Russia	451.85
10 m platform	Martin Wolfram; Germany	575.30	Viktor Minibaev; Russia	541.70	Vadim Kaptur; Belarus	491.55
3 m synchro springboard	Russia; Ilya Zakharov; Evgeny Kuznetsov	462.96	Ukraine; Illya Kvasha; Oleksandr Horshkovozov	430.89	Germany; Patrick Hausding; Stephan Feck	419.73
10 m synchro platform	Germany; Patrick Hausding; Sascha Klein	458.10	Russia; Roman Izmailov; Viktor Minibaev	435.84	Ukraine; Maksym Dolgov; Oleksandr Horshkovozov	430.26

=== Women ===
Event	Gold		Silver		Bronze	
1 m springboard	Tania Cagnotto; Italy	291.20	Nadezhda Bazhina; Russia	279.40	Olena Fedorova; Ukraine	275.40
3 m springboard	Tania Cagnotto; Italy	350.20	Kristina Ilinykh; Russia	334.15	Tina Punzel; Germany	330.90
10 m platform	Yulia Prokopchuk; Ukraine	327.50	Laura Marino; France	323.60	Noemi Batki; Italy	323.30
3 m synchro springboard	Italy; Tania Cagnotto; Francesca Dallapé	313.08	Germany; Tina Punzel; Nora Subschinski	302.70	Russia; Nadezhda Bazhina; Kristina Ilinykh	298.50
10 m synchro platform	Russia; Yulia Timoshinina; Ekaterina Petukhova	319.20	Great Britain; Georgia Ward; Robyn Birch	310.74	Hungary; Villő Kormos; Zsófia Reisinger	291.72

=== Mixed ===
Event	Gold		Silver		Bronze	
Team event	Russia; Nadezhda Bazhina; Viktor Minibaev	406.50	Germany; Maria Kurjo; Patrick Hausding	399.15	Ukraine; Yulia Prokopchuk; Illya Kvasha	383.50

== See also ==
2015 European Diving Championships – Women's 10 metre platform
