= Vladimir Barbu =

Italian diver (born 1998)

Personal information
- Born: 7 August 1998 (age 26); Cles, Italy

Sport
- Sport: Diving

Vladimir Barbu (born 7 August 1998) is an Italian diver.

Trained by Giorgio Cagnotto, he placed 15th at the 2017 World Aquatics Championships in Budapest, finishing fifteenth in the diving competition from the 10 metre platform ,

Barbu also represented Italy in the men's 10 metre platform event at the 2016; 2017, and 2018 European aquatics championships; placing respectively in the 15th, 5th, and 9th positions in the aforementioned yeats.

Barbu also models.
