= Yulia Prokopchuk =

Ukrainian diver

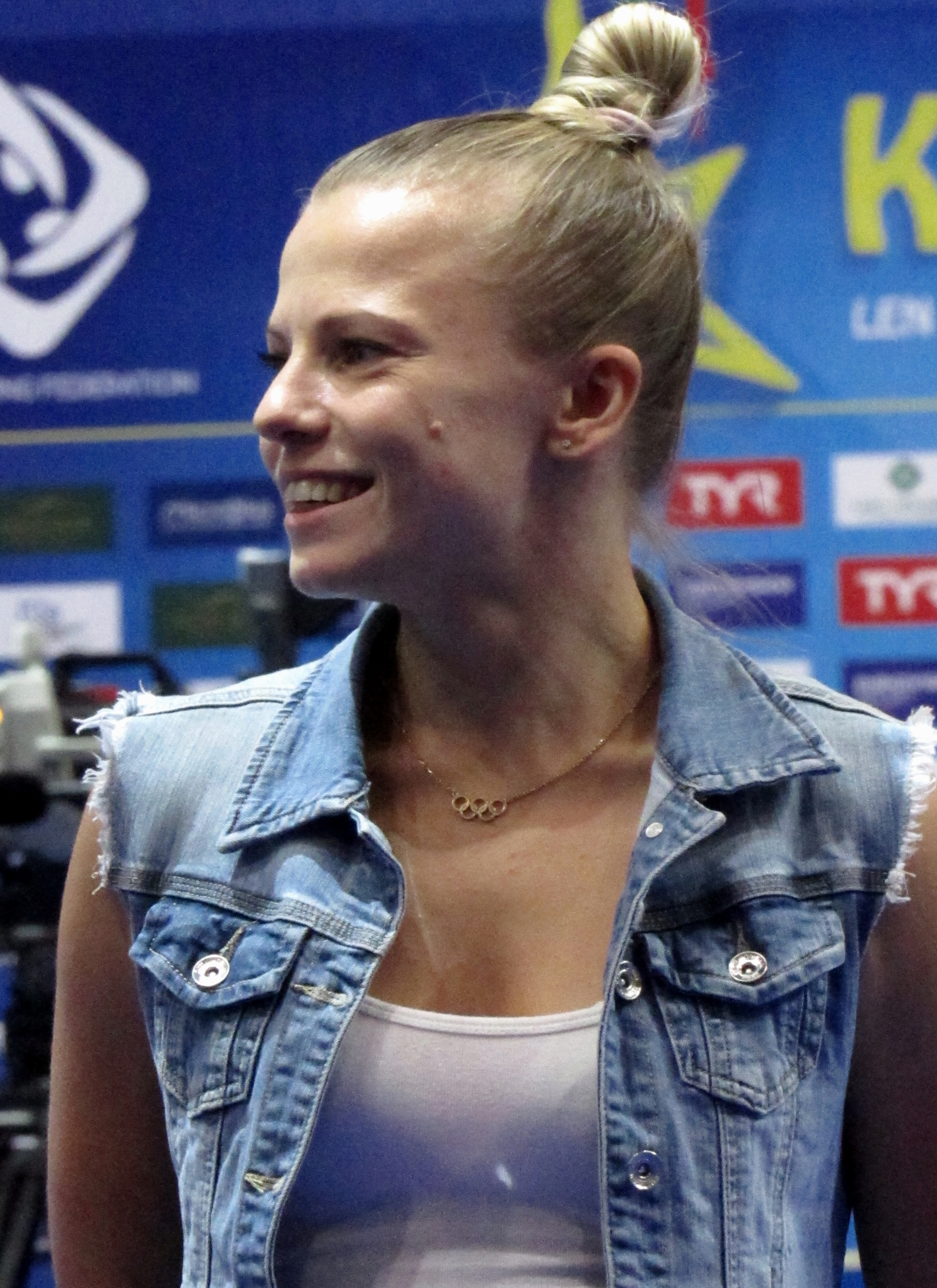
- Prokopchuk in Kyiv, 2019

Personal information
- Full name: Yulia Anatoliyivna Prokopchuk
- Born: 23 October 1986 (age 39) Ukrainka, Kyiv Oblast, Ukrainian SSR, Soviet Union

Sport
- Sport: Diving
Medal record
Women's diving
Representing Ukraine
World Championships
Silver medal – second place	2015 Kazan	Team
Bronze medal – third place	2013 Barcelona	10 m platform
European Aquatics Championships
Gold medal – first place	2006 Budapest	10 m platform
Gold medal – first place	2012 Eindhoven	10 m platform
Gold medal – first place	2016 London	10 m platform
Gold medal – first place	2016 London	Mixed 10 m synchro
Silver medal – second place	2008 Eindhoven	10 m platform
Silver medal – second place	2008 Eindhoven	10 m synchro
Silver medal – second place	2010 Budapest	10 m synchro
Silver medal – second place	2012 Eindhoven	10 metre synchro
Silver medal – second place	2014 Berlin	Team event
Silver medal – second place	2016 London	Team event
Bronze medal – third place	2006 Budapest	10 m synchro
Bronze medal – third place	2014 Berlin	10 m platform
European Diving Championships
Gold medal – first place	2013 Rostock	10 m platform
Gold medal – first place	2013 Rostock	Team event
Gold medal – first place	2015 Rostock	10 m platform
Bronze medal – third place	2011 Turin	10 metre synchro
Bronze medal – third place	2015 Rostock	Team event
Summer Universiade
Bronze medal – third place	2009 Belgrade	10m platform
World Cup
Silver medal – second place	2014 Changhai	Mixed team

Yulia Anatoliyivna Prokopchuk (Ukrainian: Юлія Анатоліївна Прокопчук, also transliterated Yuliia or Iuliia; born 23 October 1986) is a retired Ukrainian diver. She has won seven gold medals at the European Championships and two medals (silver and bronze) at the World Championships.

== Career ==
Prokopchuk participated in the 10 m platform event at the 2008 Summer Olympics.

With her partner, Viktoriya Potyekhina, she won the silver medal in the 10 m synchro event of the European Aquatics Championships. A few months later, Prokopchuk appeared at the 2012 Summer Olympics, competing in the 10 m platform event and in the 10 m platform synchronized event with Potyekhina.

Prokopchuk won bronze in the 10 m platform event at the 2013 World Championships and silver in the team event at the 2015 World Championships.

She finished 14th in the 10 m platform event at the 2016 Summer Olympics in Rio de Janeiro.
