= Nadezhda Bazhina =

Russian diver

Personal information
- Born: 29 December 1987 (age 38) Penza, Russian SFSR, Soviet Union
- Height: 1.70 m (5 ft 7 in)

Sport
- Country: Russia
- Sport: Diving
- Event(s): 1 m, 3 m, 3 m synchro
Medal record
World Championships
Silver medal – second place	2017 Budapest	1 m springboard
Bronze medal – third place	2017 Budapest	3 m synchro
European Aquatics Championships
Gold medal – first place	2006 Budapest	3 m synchro
Gold medal – first place	2010 Budapest	3 m springboard
Gold medal – first place	2014 Berlin	3 m springboard
Gold medal – first place	2014 Berlin	Team event
Gold medal – first place	2016 London	Team event
Silver medal – second place	2018 Glasgow	1 m springboard
Bronze medal – third place	2012 Eindhoven	Team event
Bronze medal – third place	2012 Eindhoven	1 m springboard
Bronze medal – third place	2016 London	1 m springboard
Bronze medal – third place	2016 London	3 m synchro
Bronze medal – third place	2016 London	3 m mixed synchro
Bronze medal – third place	2018 Glasgow	3 m synchro
European Diving Championships
Gold medal – first place	2015 Rostock	Team event
Gold medal – first place	2017 Kyiv	3 m synchro
Silver medal – second place	2011 Turin	1 m springboard
Silver medal – second place	2011 Turin	3 m springboard
Silver medal – second place	2011 Turin	3 m synchro
Silver medal – second place	2013 Rostock	1 m springboard
Silver medal – second place	2015 Rostock	1 m springboard
Silver medal – second place	2017 Kyiv	1 m springboard
Bronze medal – third place	2013 Rostock	3 m springboard
Bronze medal – third place	2015 Rostock	3 m synchro
Bronze medal – third place	2017 Kyiv	Team event

Nadezhda Valeryevna Bazhina (Russian: Надежда Валерьевна Бажина; born 29 December 1987) is a Russian diver. She won the 3 m springboard event at the 2010 European Aquatics Championships and at the 2014 European Aquatics Championship.

In the Rio 2016 Olympics, she flopped on her dive after a slip from the board, resulting in a zero score. Bazhina won her first WC medal at the 2017 World Aquatics Championships in Budapest, Hungary. There she won silver losing only to Australian Maddison Keeney.
