= Oleksandr Horshkovozov =

Ukrainian diver (born 1991)

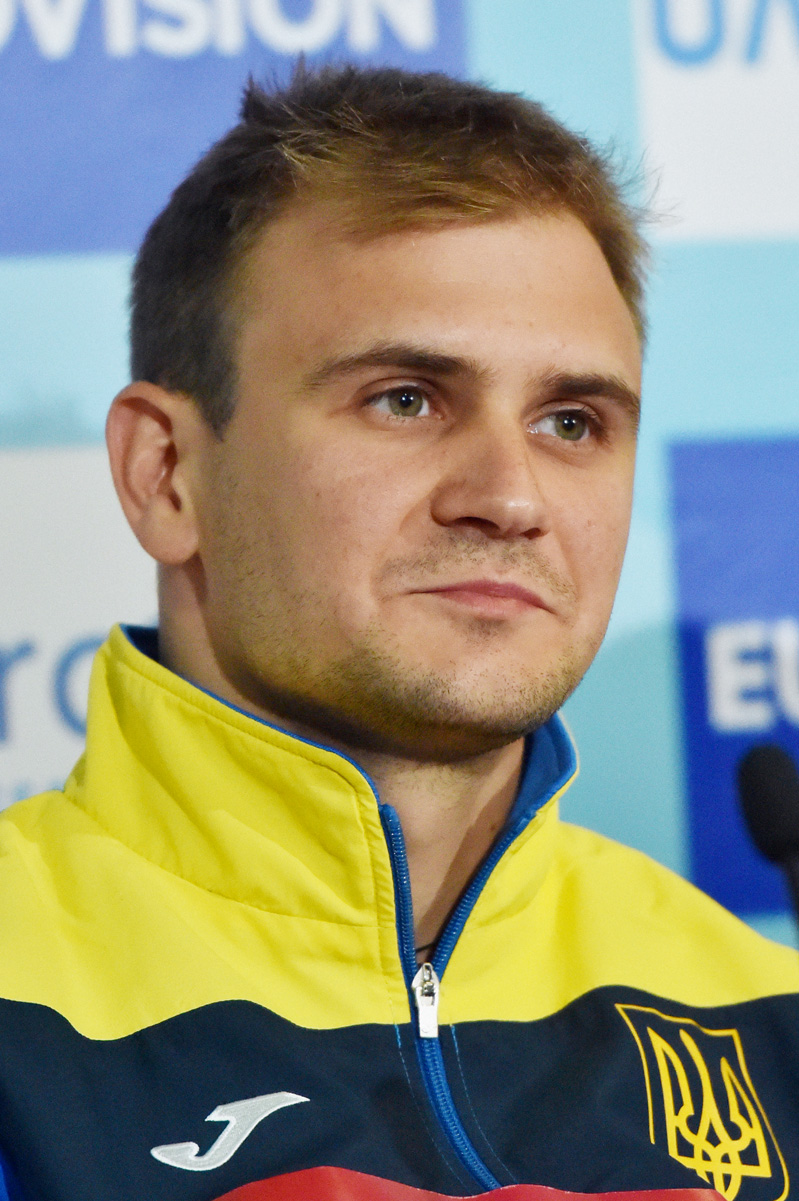
- Oleksandr Horshkovozov at the 2017 European Diving Championships in Kyiv

Personal information
- Full name: Oleksandr Olehovych Horshkovozov
- Born: 18 July 1991 (age 34) Luhansk, Ukrainian SSR, Soviet Union
Medal record
Men's diving
Representing Ukraine
Event	1st	2nd	3rd
World Championships	0	1	1
European Championships	0	1	5
European Diving Championships	1	2	3
Summer Universiade	1	0	0
Military Games	0	1	0
World Junior Championships	0	1	1
European Junior Diving Championships	3	2	2
Total	5	8	12
World Championships
Silver medal – second place	2015 Kazan	Team event
Bronze medal – third place	2011 Shanghai	10m synchro
European Championships
Silver medal – second place	2016 London	Team event
Bronze medal – third place	2014 Berlin	3m synchro
Bronze medal – third place	2016 London	3m synchro
Bronze medal – third place	2016 London	10m synchro
Bronze medal – third place	2020 Budapest	3 m synchro
Bronze medal – third place	2022 Rome	3 m synchro
European Diving Championships
Gold medal – first place	2017 Kyiv	10m synchro
Silver medal – second place	2015 Rostock	3m synchro
Silver medal – second place	2017 Kyiv	Team event
Bronze medal – third place	2013 Rostock	3m synchro
Bronze medal – third place	2013 Rostock	10m synchro
Bronze medal – third place	2015 Rostock	10m synchro
Summer Universiade
Gold medal – first place	2017 Taipei	Mixed team
Military World Games
Silver medal – second place	2019 Wuhan	3 m synchro
World Junior Championships
Silver medal – second place	2008 Aachen	3 m springboard
Bronze medal – third place	2006 Kuala Lumpur	10 m platform
European Junior Diving Championships
Gold medal – first place	2006 Palma de Mallorca	3 m springboard
Gold medal – first place	2008 Minsk	3 m synchro
Gold medal – first place	2009 Budapest	1 m springboard
Silver medal – second place	2006 Palma de Mallorca	3 m synchro
Silver medal – second place	2006 Palma de Mallorca	1 m springboard
Silver medal – second place	2009 Budapest	3 m synchro
Bronze medal – third place	2005 Elektrostal	10 m platform
Bronze medal – third place	2006 Palma de Mallorca	10 m platform

Oleksandr Olehovych Horshkovozov (Ukrainian: Олександр Олегович Горшковозов; born 18 July 1991, in Luhansk) is a Ukrainian diver.

== Career ==
He has won two medals at the World Championships (silver at the 2015 World Championship in the team event with Yuliia Prokopchuk, bronze at the 2011 World Championships with Oleksandr Bondar in the men's synchronized 10 metre platform) and eight at the European Championships.

Horshkovozov competed in the men's synchronized 10 metre platform event at the 2012 Summer Olympics, finishing 8th with Oleksandr Bondar, and at the 2016 Summer Olympics in Rio, finishing 6th with Maksym Dolhov.
