= Nikita Shleikher =

Russian diver (born 1998)

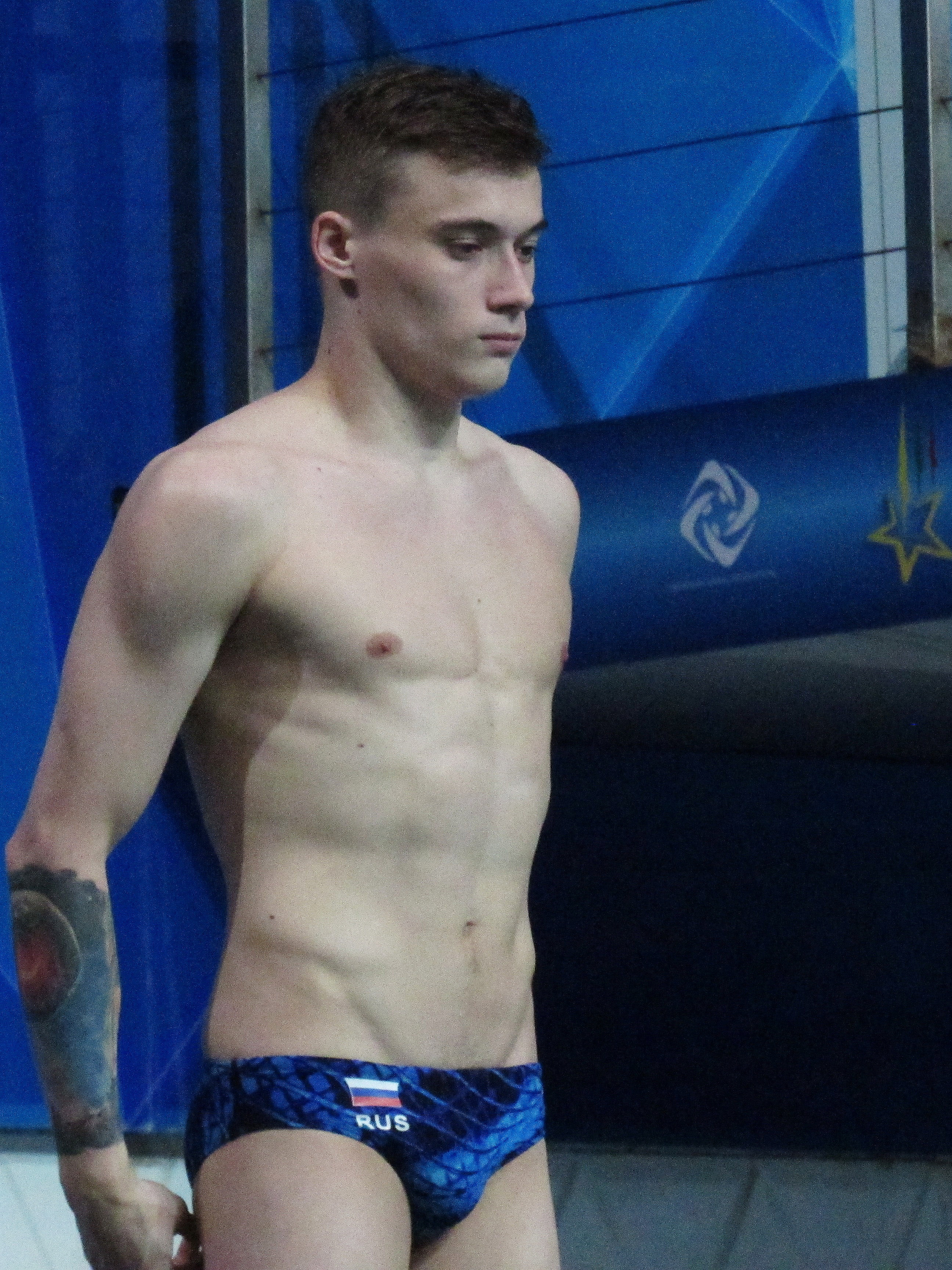
- Nikita Shleikher at the Rio Olympics

Personal information
- Full name: Nikita Dmitrievich Shleikher
- Nickname: Sasha
- National team: Russia
- Born: 10 June 1998 (age 28) Stavropol, Stavropol Krai, Russia
- Height: 1.70 m (5 ft 7 in)
- Weight: 65 kg (143 lb)

Sport
- Country: Russia
- Sport: Diving
- Events: platform, springboard, mixed synchro
Medal record
Men's diving
Representing Neutral Athletes B
World Championships
Silver medal – second place	2025 Singapore	10 m synchro
European Championships
Gold medal – first place	2026 Paris	10 m synchro
Silver medal – second place	2026 Paris	3 m synchro
Representing Russia
European Games
Gold medal – first place	2015 Baku	1 m springboard
Silver medal – second place	2015 Baku	10 m platform
European Championships
Gold medal – first place	2018 Glasgow	Mixed 10 m synchro
Silver medal – second place	2018 Glasgow	10 m platform
Silver medal – second place	2020 Budapest	3 m springboard
Silver medal – second place	2020 Budapest	3 m synchro
Bronze medal – third place	2016 London	10 m platform
Bronze medal – third place	2016 London	Mixed 3 m synchro
Bronze medal – third place	2016 London	Mixed 10 m synchro
European Diving Championships
Gold medal – first place	2019 Kyiv	3 m synchro
Gold medal – first place	2019 Kyiv	10 m synchro
Silver medal – second place	2017 Kyiv	10 m synchro
Summer Universiade
Gold medal – first place	2017 Taipei	10 m synchro
Silver medal – second place	2017 Taipei	Mixed 10 m synchro
European Junior Championships
Gold medal – first place	2012 Antwerp	10 m platform
Silver medal – second place	2013 Poznan	3 m springboard
Bronze medal – third place	2013 Poznan	10 m platform

Nikita Dmitrievich Shleikher (Russian: Никита Дмитриевич Шлейхер; born 10 June 1998) is a Russian diver.

== Career ==
Shleikher began practicing diving at the school of Olympic reserve in Penza, where he became a multiple medalist and champion of Russian Junior Championships. In 2012, he won the Junior European Championships in men's 10m platform. He competed at the 2012 World Junior Championships finishing 5th in 10m platform and 7th in 3m springboard. He won a silver and a bronze at the 2014 European Junior Diving Championships.

Shleikher relocated to Kazan and took up residency in the Tatarstan. He finished 5th in 10m platform at the 2014 European Championships in Berlin.

In 2015, Shleikher competed at the inaugural 2015 European Games, where he won gold in 1m springboard but took only 2nd place in 10m platform behind Britain's Matty Lee. He finished 5th in mixed 10 metre platform and 7th in men's 10m platform at the 2015 World Championships in Kazan, thus qualifying him for both events at the 2016 Summer Olympics.
