= Matty Lee =

British diver (born 1998)

Matty Lee MBE
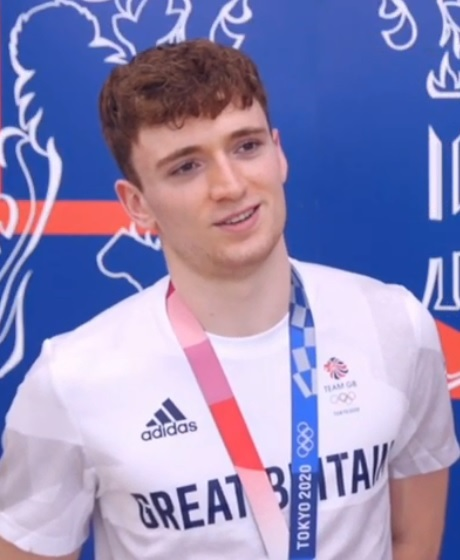
- Lee in 2021

Personal information
- Full name: Matthew Lee
- Born: 5 March 1998 (age 28) Leeds, West Yorkshire, England
- Height: 1.77 m (5 ft 10 in)
- Weight: 70 kg (11 st 0 lb)

Sport
- Country: Great Britain; England
- Sport: Diving
- Events: 1 m, 3 m, 10 m, 10 m synchro
- Club: Dive London
- Coached by: Jane Figueiredo
- Retired: 2025
Medal record
Representing Great Britain
Olympic Games
Gold medal – first place	2020 Tokyo	10 m synchro
World Championships
Silver medal – second place	2017 Budapest	Mixed 10 m synchro
Silver medal – second place	2022 Budapest	10 m synchro
Bronze medal – third place	2019 Gwangju	10 m synchro
European Championships
Gold medal – first place	2020 Budapest	10 m synchro
Silver medal – second place	2018 Glasgow	Mixed 10 m synchro
Silver medal – second place	2016 London	Mixed 10 m synchro
Bronze medal – third place	2016 London	Team event
European Diving Championships
Gold medal – first place	2017 Kyiv	Mixed 10 m synchro
Bronze medal – third place	2017 Kyiv	10 m platform
European Games
Gold medal – first place	2015 Baku	10 m platform
European Junior Championships
Gold medal – first place	2013 Poznan	3 m springboard
Gold medal – first place	2012 Graz	3 m springboard
Silver medal – second place	2013 Poznan	10 m platform
Bronze medal – third place	2013 Poznan	1 m springboard
FINA Diving World Cup
Gold medal – first place	2021 Tokyo	10 m synchro
British Championships
Gold medal – first place	2018 Plymouth	10 m synchro
Silver medal – second place	2018 Plymouth	10 m platform
Representing England
Commonwealth Games
Gold medal – first place	2022 Birmingham	10 m synchro
Bronze medal – third place	2022 Birmingham	10 m platform

Matthew Lee (born 5 March 1998) is a retired British elite diver and Olympic gold medallist. Adept in both individual and synchronised diving, and across both 3-metre springboard and platform, Lee won the gold medal in 10-metre platform at the 2015 European Games, the mixed 10-metre synchronised platform at the 2017 European Diving Championships and has twice been European junior champion on the 3-metre springboard. At world level, Lee won the silver medal in the mixed 10-metre synchronised platform event at the 2017 World Championships, and at the 2019 World Championships, Lee and Tom Daley won bronze in the 10 m synchro event, as well as gold in July 2021 at the 2020 Tokyo Olympics.

== Early life ==
Matty Lee was born to Helen and Tim Lee on 5 March 1998 in Leeds. He learned to swim, then took up diving in 2005 at the age of seven. He was also involved in gymnastics and aikido, but chose to concentrate on diving in 2007. He trained with the City of Leeds Diving Club at the John Charles Centre for Sport. He studied at Carr Manor Community School from 2009 to 2014, and Notre Dame Catholic Sixth Form College from 2014 to 2016.

== Career ==
In 2012, Lee competed at his first European Junior Championships. He won the 3 m Springboard gold and then went to compete at the World Junior Championships later in the season, securing a top result of seventh in the Group B Platform.

In 2013, Lee won medals in all three Group B individual events at his second European Junior Championships, defending his 3 m title and taking silver in 10 m Platform, bronze in 1m Springboard.

In 2014, he debuted as a senior in the World Cup series. He was selected to compete at the 2014 Commonwealth Games, but withdrew from the diving squad due to injury.

In 2015, Lee competed at the inaugural 2015 European Games held in Baku. He won gold in 10 m platform beating Russia's Nikita Shleikher.

=== 2017 ===
At the 2017 European Diving Championships in Kyiv, Lee won a bronze in the Men's 10-metre platform, and a gold in the mixed 10 m platform synchro with diving partner Lois Toulson. The pair then won a silver at the 2017 World Aquatics Championships in the 10 m mixed synchro.

=== 2018–2019 ===
At the 2018 British Diving Championships, Lee and his partner Kyle Kothari (from London) won the 10 m synchro event with a final score of 406.17, a sizeable margin over the second place score of 388.50. He came second in the men's 10 m platform with a score of 485.60.

Lee and his partner Lois Toulson won a bronze at the 2018 FINA Diving World Series held in Beijing in the mixed platform synchro. At the 2018 European Championships held in Glasgow/Edinburgh, Lee and Toulson won a silver in the mixed 10-metre platform synchro.

Starting October 2018, Lee partnered with Tom Daley in the men's synchronised 10-metre platform.

At the 2019 World Aquatics Championships held in Gwangju, South Korea, Lee and Daley finished in the bronze position in the 10 m synchro.

=== 2021–2025 ===
At the 2021 FINA Diving World Cup held in Japan, Lee and Daley won gold in synchronised 10 m platform. The pair also won gold in synchronised 10 m platform at the European Championships held in Budapest.

At the 2020 Tokyo Olympics, Lee won Gold alongside Daley in the Men's synchronised 10 m platform event, edging out China's Cao Yuan and Chen Aisen with a total score of 471.81.

Lee was appointed Member of the Order of the British Empire (MBE) in the 2022 New Year Honours for services to diving.

At the 2022 World Aquatics Championships held in Budapest, Lee partnered with Noah Williams for the first time in an international competition and they won silver in the synchro 10 m platform event.

Lee and Williams again partnered at the 2022 Commonwealth Games in the synchro 10m platform, where the pair won gold. In individual events, Lee won a bronze in 10 m platform.

In March 2024, Lee underwent a discectomy on the L5/S1 disc in his spine, effectively ruling him out of competing at the 2024 Paris Olympics.

Lee announced his retirement from diving in February 2025.

== Television ==
In November 2021, Lee was announced as a contestant on the twenty-first series of I'm a Celebrity...Get Me Out of Here!. He finished in fifth place.

Lee appeared on The Chase on 28 August 2022 with Sunetra Sarker, Basil Brush, and David Arnold. All four celebrities completed in the Final Chase against Darragh Ennis for £19,000. The team beat Ennis with each celebrity taking £4,750 home for their charities.
