= Maksym Dolhov =

Ukrainian diver (born 1996)

Maksym Dolgov
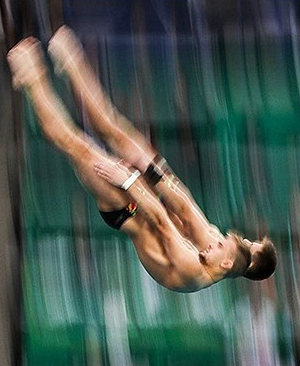
- Diving at the 2016 Summer Olympics – Men's synchronized 10 metre platform

Personal information
- Full name: Maksym Eduardovych Dolhov
- Born: 16 June 1996 (age 30) Zaporizhia, Ukraine

Sport
- Sport: Diving
Medal record
European Championships
Gold medal – first place	2016 London	Mixed 10m synchro
Bronze medal – third place	2014 Berlin	10m synchro
Bronze medal – third place	2016 London	10m synchro
European Diving Championships
Gold medal – first place	2017 Kyiv	10m synchro
Bronze medal – third place	2015 Rostock	10m synchro
European Junior Diving Championships
Gold medal – first place	2012 Graz	10 m platform
Silver medal – second place	2011 Belgrade	10 m platform
Silver medal – second place	2011 Belgrade	3 m springboard

Maksym Eduardovych Dolhov (Ukrainian: Максим Едуардович Долгов, born 16 June 1996, in Zaporizhia) is a Ukrainian diver.

== Career ==
He has won multiple European championships medals, including the 2016 gold medal in mixed 10 m platform synchro. He competed at the 2016 Summer Olympics in Rio, finishing 6th with Oleksandr Horshkovozov in the men's synchronized 10 metre platform event.

== See also ==
- Ukraine at the 2015 World Aquatics Championships
