= Ekaterina Petukhova =

Russian diver (born 1996)

Personal information
- Full name: Ekaterina Ilyinichna Petukhova
- Born: 16 June 1996 (age 30) Moscow, Russia

Sport
- Country: Russia
- Sport: diving
- Club: MGFSO
- Coached by: Svetlana Timoshinina
Medal record
European Championships
Gold medal – first place	2014 Berlin	10 m synchro
Gold medal – first place	2015 Rostock	10 m synchro
- Updated on 25 August 2015

Ekaterina Petukhova (Russian: Екатерина Петухова; born 16 June 1996) is a female diver from Russia.

She competed at the 2015 World Aquatics Championships. She also competed at the 2016 Rio de Janeiro Summer Olympics.

== See also ==
- Russia at the 2015 World Aquatics Championships
- Russia at the 2016 Summer Olympics
