= Viktor Minibaev =

Russian diver (born 1991)

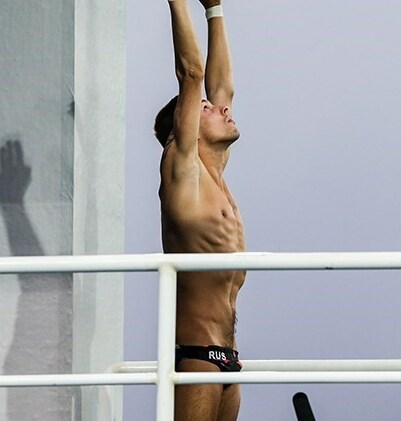
- Minibaev at the 2016 Summer Olympics

Personal information
- Nationality: Russian
- Born: 18 July 1991 (age 34) Moscow, Russia
- Height: 1.74 m (5 ft 9 in)
- Weight: 64 kg (141 lb)

Sport
- Country: Russia
- Sport: Diving
- Event(s): 10 m, 10 m synchro
- Club: Dynamo Moscow
Medal record
Representing (Russia) ROC
Olympic Games
Bronze medal – third place	2020 Tokyo	10 m synchro
Representing (Russia)
World Championships
Silver medal – second place	2013 Barcelona	10 m synchro
Silver medal – second place	2017 Budapest	10 m synchro
Silver medal – second place	2019 Gwangju	10 m synchro
Silver medal – second place	2019 Gwangju	10 m mixed synchro
Bronze medal – third place	2015 Kazan	10 m synchro
European Championships
Gold medal – first place	2014 Berlin	10 m platform
Gold medal – first place	2014 Berlin	Team event
Gold medal – first place	2015 Rostock	Team event
Gold medal – first place	2016 London	Team event
Gold medal – first place	2018 Glasgow	10 m synchro
Gold medal – first place	2019 Kyiv	10 m mixed synchro
Gold medal – first place	2020 Budapest	Team event
Silver medal – second place	2010 Budapest	10 m synchro
Silver medal – second place	2012 Eindhoven	10 m platform
Silver medal – second place	2012 Eindhoven	10 m synchro
Silver medal – second place	2013 Rostock	10 m synchro
Silver medal – second place	2015 Rostock	10 m platform
Silver medal – second place	2016 London	10 m platform
Silver medal – second place	2019 Kyiv	Team event
Bronze medal – third place	2013 Rostock	10 m platform
Bronze medal – third place	2020 Budapest	10m mixed synchro
Bronze medal – third place	2020 Budapest	10 m platform
Summer Universiade
Silver medal – second place	2013 Kazan	Team
Silver medal – second place	2013 Kazan	10 m synchro
Silver medal – second place	2011 Shenzhen	10 m platform synchro
Silver medal – second place	2011 Shenzhen	10 m platform
Bronze medal – third place	2013 Kazan	10 m platform
Bronze medal – third place	2011 Shenzhen	Team

Viktor Eduardovich Minibaev (Russian: Виктор Эдуардович Минибаев, IPA: [ˈvʲiktər ɨdʊˈardəvʲɪtɕ mʲɪnʲɪˈbajɪf]; born 18 July 1991) is a Russian diver who has won medals at World and European level and competed at three Olympic Games.

== Career ==
Minibaev's first major international medal came in the men's synchronized 10 metre platform event at the 2010 European Championships.

Minibaev competed at the 2012 Summer Olympics in the men's synchronized 10 metre platform (with Ilya Zakharov) and the men's 10 m platform. At the European Championships that year, he won silver in both events.

With Artem Chesakov, Minibaev won silver at the 2013 World Championships in the men's synchronised 10 m platform event. In 2015, in a World Championships on home ground in Kazan, Minibaev won a bronze medal in that event with Roman Izmailov. At the 2014 European Championships, Minibaev won gold in the men's 10 m platform and gold in the team event.

At the 2016 Summer Olympics, he competed in the same events, teaming with Nikita Shleykher in the synchronised 10 m platform event. At the European Championships that year, he again won gold in the mixed team event, and silver in the men's 10 m platform.

In 2017, he won World Championship men's synchronised 10 m platform silver again, this time with Aleksandr Bondar. The team won silver again at the 2019 World Championships. Minibaev also won silver in the mixed synchronised 10 m platform at that event, with Ekaterina Beliaeva. In 2018, he won European gold in the men's synchronised 10 m platform event.
