= European Diving Championships =

Diving competition

- Most recent season or competition: 2025 European Diving Championships
- Sport: Diving
- Founded: 2009
- Founder: LEN
- Continent: Europe
- Most recent champion: Germany (1)
- Most titles: Russia (5)

The European Diving Championships are biennial diving competitions, organized by LEN. The meet features divers from Europe, competing in events on 1-meter and 3-meter springboards and on 10-meter platform. The meet has traditionally been held in June.

== History ==
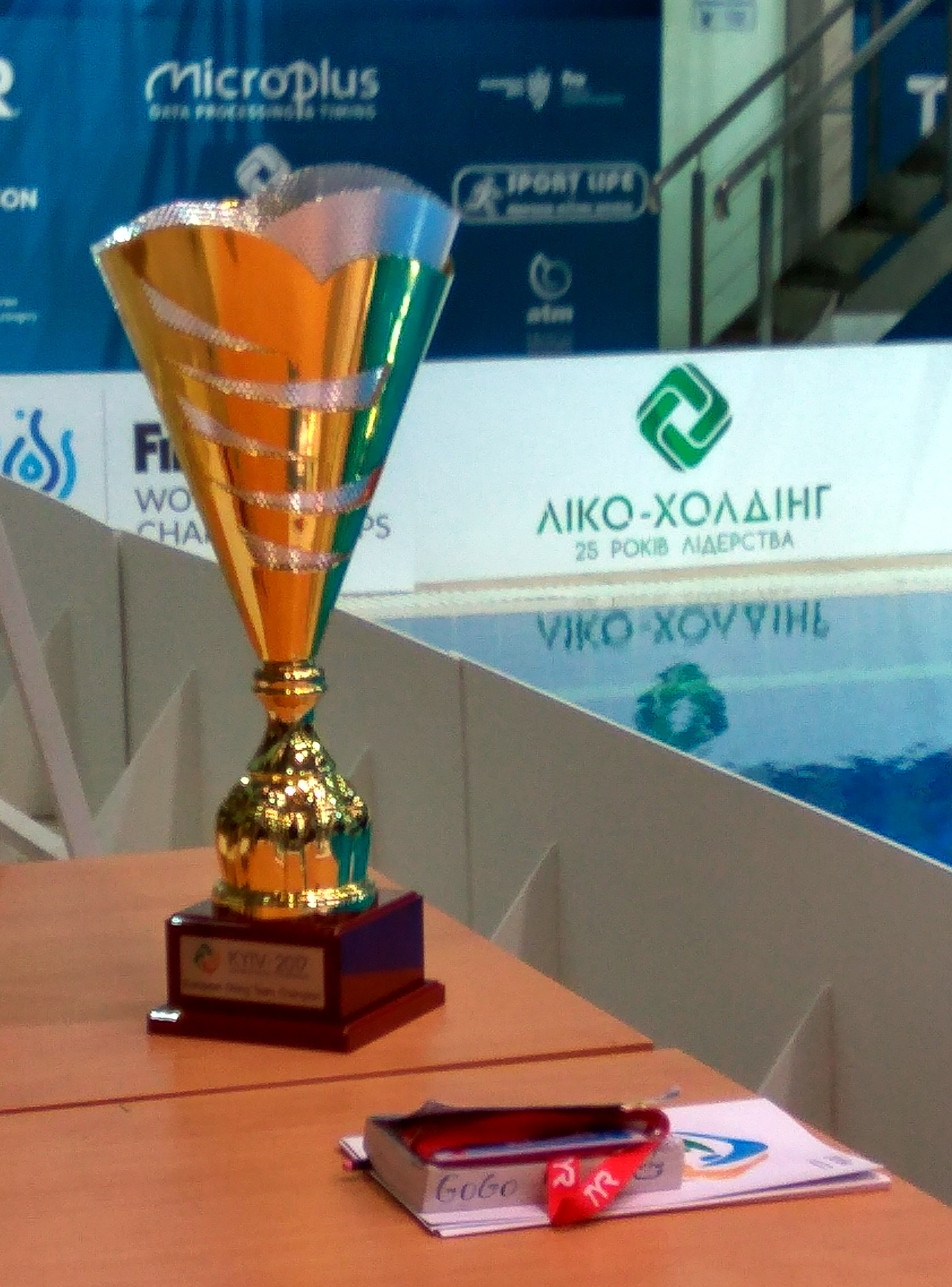
Trophy for the European Diving Champion

Diving was an integral part of the European Aquatics Championships since its introduction in 1926.

A separate Diving Championships were first held in 2009 in Turin, and featured 10 events: individual diving from 1-meter springboard, 3-meter springboard and 10-meter platform among both men and women, and synchronized diving from 3-meter springboard and 10-meter platform among both men and women as well. The team event was added for the second edition of the Championships in Turin. Synchronized mixed diving events on 3-meter springboard and 10-meter platform were added for the fifth edition of the Championships in Kyiv.

Winners in the diving portion of the European Aquatics Championships event and in the separate European Diving Championships are both considered European champions, with new champions effectively being crowned annually.

A country that receives the most total points during the Championships officially becomes the European diving champion. The number of points is determined by results of all finalists, not only the medal holders. The 2017 European diving champion was Ukraine.

A 2021 championship, which was to be a 7th edition, was cancelled due to the COVID-19 pandemic.

The most recent edition, the eighth edition was held between 22 and 28 May 2025 in Antalia.

== Editions ==
Number	Year	Host city	Date	Events	Champion by points	Winner of the medal table	Second in the medal table	Third in the medal table
1	2009	(Italy) Turin	1–5 April	10	Russia	Russia	Italy	Ukraine
2	2011	(Italy) Turin	8–13 March	11	Russia	Russia	Germany	Italy
3	2013	(Germany) Rostock	18–23 June	11	Russia	Ukraine	Russia	Germany
4	2015	(Germany) Rostock	9–14 June	11	Russia	Russia	Italy	Germany
5	2017	(Ukraine) Kyiv	12–18 June	13	Ukraine	Russia	Ukraine	Great Britain
6	2019	(Ukraine) Kyiv	5–11 August	13	Russia	Russia	Ukraine	Germany
7	2023	(Poland) Rzeszów	22–28 June	13		Ukraine	Germany	Great Britain
8	2025	(Turkey) Antalia	22–28 May	13	Germany	Ukraine	Germany	Italy

== Medal table ==
As of after 2025 edition. Source:

Rank	Nation	Gold	Silver	Bronze	Total
1	Russia	23	26	14	63
2	Ukraine	22	15	16	53
3	Italy	18	10	13	41
4	Germany	16	26	20	62
5	Great Britain	6	7	15	28
6	France	4	5	5	14
7	Switzerland	2	1	3	6
8	Sweden	1	3	2	6
9	Netherlands	1	1	2	4
10	Spain	1	0	2	3
11	Poland	1	0	0	1
12	Armenia	0	1	0	1
13	Austria	0	0	1	1
13	Belarus	0	0	1	1
13	Hungary	0	0	1	1
Totals (15 entries)		95	95	95	285

== See also ==
- European Junior Diving Championships
