= Villő Kormos =

Hungarian diver (born 1988)

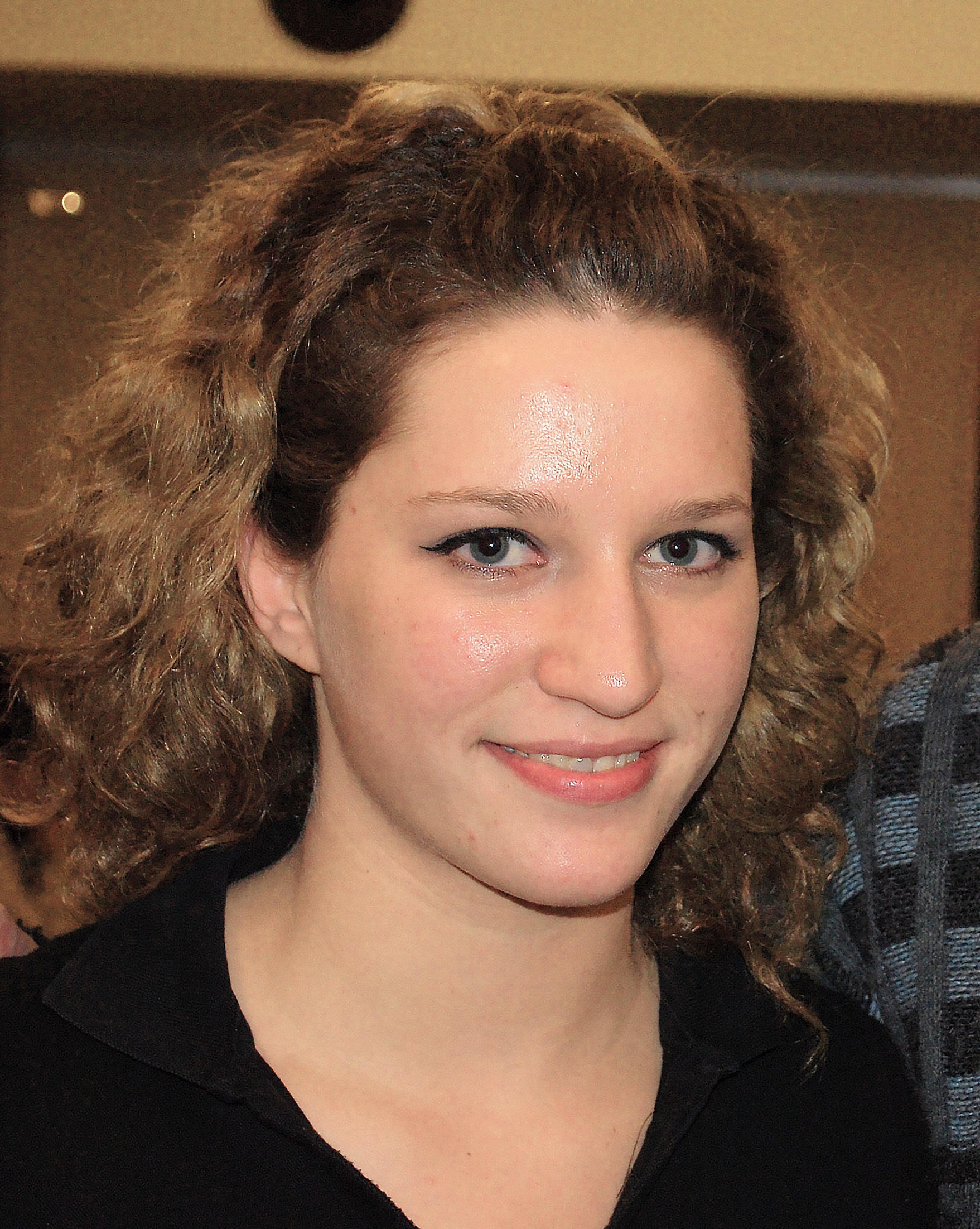

Personal information
- Nationality: Hungarian
- Born: 2 August 1988 (age 38) Budapest, Hungary
- Height: 1.70 m (5 ft 7 in)
- Weight: 60 kg (132 lb)

Sport
- Country: Hungary
- Sport: Diving
- Event: Springboard
- Club: Rugóláb Lendület SE (HUN)
- Coached by: Katalin Haász
Medal record
European Championships
Bronze medal – third place	2014 Berlin	10 m synchro
Bronze medal – third place	2016 London	10 m synchro

Gyongyver Villő Kormos (born 2 August 1988) is a Hungarian diver.

== Career ==
At age sixteen, Kormos became one of the youngest divers to compete at the 2004 Summer Olympics in Athens. She placed thirty-second in the preliminary rounds of the women's springboard event, with a score of 193.68.

At the 2008 Summer Olympics in Beijing, Kormos competed for the second time in the women's springboard event, along with her compatriot Nóra Barta. She placed twenty-fourth in the preliminary rounds of the competition, with a score of 247.95.

Kormos is a full-time member of Rugóláb Lendület SE in Budapest, being coached and trained by Katalin Haász.

She announced her retirement on March 8, 2018.
