= Yulia Timoshinina =

Russian diver (born 1998)

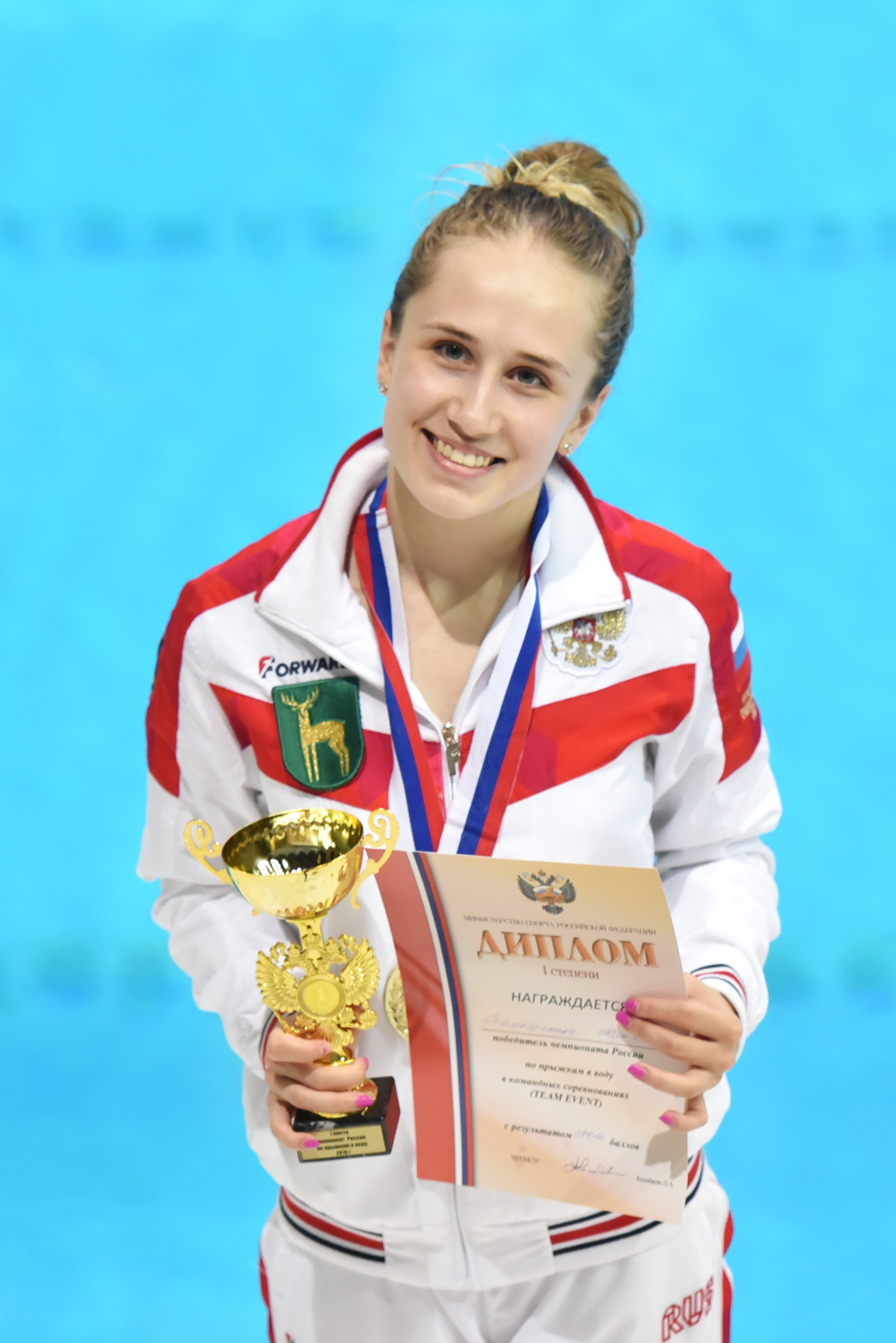
- Timoshinina in 2019

Personal information
- Full name: Yulia Vladimirovna Timoshinina
- Nationality: (Russia) Russian
- Born: 23 January 1998 (age 28) Moscow, Russia
- Height: 1.62 m (5 ft 4 in)
- Weight: 48 kg (106 lb)

Sport
- Country: Russia
- Sport: Diving
- Event: 10 m synchro
- Club: MGFSO
Medal record
World Championships
Silver medal – second place	2019 Gwangju	Mixed team
European Championships
Gold medal – first place	2014 Berlin	10 m synchro
Gold medal – first place	2018 Glasgow	Mixed 10 m synchro
Gold medal – first place	2020 Budapest	10 m synchro
Silver medal – second place	2018 Glasgow	10 m synchro
Silver medal – second place	2020 Budapest	10 m platform
Bronze medal – third place	2016 London	Mixed 10 m synchro
Bronze medal – third place	2018 Glasgow	Team
Bronze medal – third place	2019 Kyiv	10 m platform
Bronze medal – third place	2019 Kyiv	10 m synchro
Summer Universiade
Silver medal – second place	2017 Taipei	Team
Silver medal – second place	2017 Taipei	Mixed 10 m synchro
Bronze medal – third place	2017 Taipei	10 m synchro
Military World Games
Silver medal – second place	2019 Wuhan	3 m synchro springboard

Yulia Vladimirovna Timoshinina (Russian: Юлия Владимировна Тимошинина, born 23 January 1998) is a Russian diver.

Timoshinina competed at the 2015 World Aquatics Championships, and the 2016 Olympic Games.

== Family ==
Timoshinina was born to diver Vladimir and Svetlana.

== See also ==
- Russia at the 2015 World Aquatics Championships
