= Maria Kurjo =

German diver

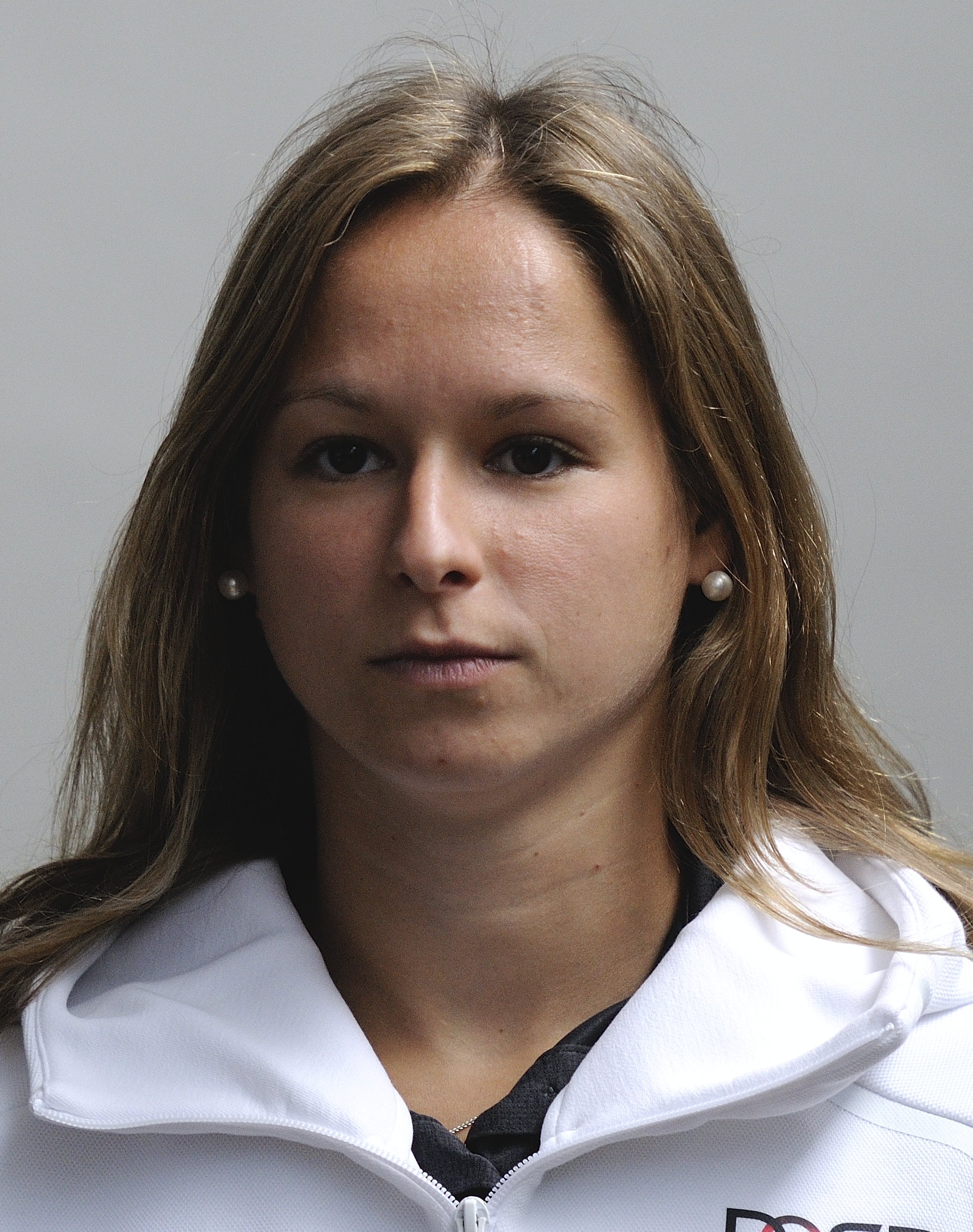
- Maria Kurjo, 2016

Personal information
- Nationality: German
- Born: 10 December 1989 (age 36) Berlin, Germany
- Height: 158 cm (5 ft 2 in)
- Weight: 52 kg (115 lb)

Sport
- Country: Germany
- Sport: Diving
Medal record
European Championships
| Gold medal – first place | 2016 London | 10 m synchro |
| Silver medal – second place | 2014 Berlin | 10 m synchro |
| Silver medal – second place | 2018 Glasgow | Team |
| Bronze medal – third place | 2013 Rostock | 10 m platform |
| Bronze medal – third place | 2013 Rostock | 10 metre synchro |
| Bronze medal – third place | 2018 Glasgow | 10m platform |
| Bronze medal – third place | 2018 Glasgow | 10m synchro |

Maria Kurjo (born 10 December 1989) is a German diver. She competed in the 10 metre platform event at the 2012 Summer Olympics, finishing in 17th place. At the 2016 Summer Olympics, she competed in the 10 m platform event. She finished 21st in the preliminary round and did not advance to the semifinal.
