= Noemi Batki =

Italian diver

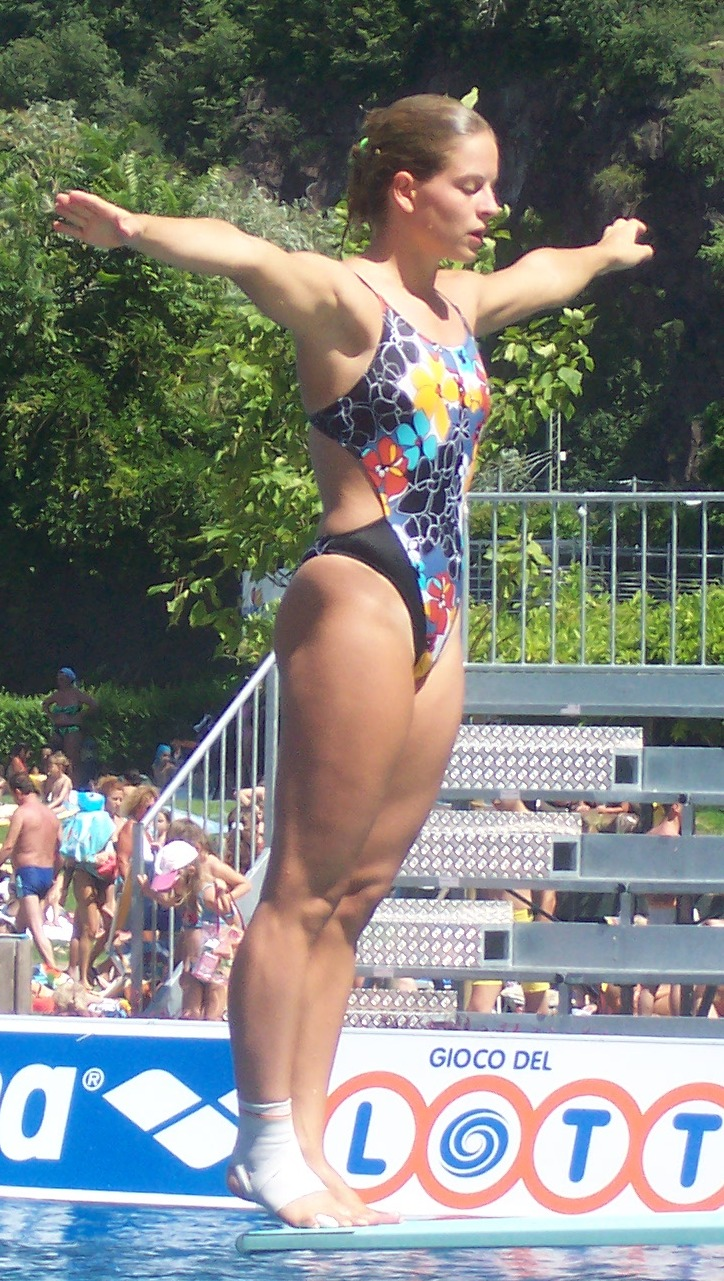

Personal information
- Nationality: Italian
- Born: 12 October 1987 (age 38) Budapest, Hungary
- Height: 1.65 m (5 ft 5 in)
- Weight: 58 kg (128 lb)

Sport
- Sport: Diving
- Event(s): 1 m, 3 m, 3 m synchro, 10 m
Medal record
Women's diving
Representing Italy
European Championships
Gold medal – first place	2011 Turin	10m platform
Silver medal – second place	2010 Budapest	10 m platform
Silver medal – second place	2012 Eindhoven	10 m platform
Silver medal – second place	2014 Berlin	10 m platform
Silver medal – second place	2018 Glasgow	10m platform
Bronze medal – third place	2008 Eindhoven	10 m platform synchro
Bronze medal – third place	2015 Rostock	10 m platform
Bronze medal – third place	2017 Eindhoven	Mixed 10 m platform synchro
Summer Universiade
Gold medal – first place	2007 Bangkok	1 m springboard

Noemi Batki (born 12 October 1987) is a Hungarian-born Italian former diver. She was a member of the Italian National Diving Team at four Olympic Games and was a member of the sports section of the Italian Army, Centro Sportivo Esercito, and Triestina Nuoto.

== Career ==
Batki was born in Budapest, Hungary. Her mother Ibolya Nagy was a Hungarian platform diver who took part in the 1992 Olympic Games in Barcelona. At the age of 3 Batki moved to Belluno, Italy. In 2004, Batki won her first medals at the Junior European Championships in Aachen, Germany. She won silver medal in the synchronised 3 metre springboard competition with teammate Francesca Dallapè, and bronze medal in the platform event.

In Spring 2005, Batki moved to Trieste. In July 2005, she took part in the FINA World Championships in Montreal, Quebec, Canada, where she placed fifth in the synchronised 3 metre springboard competition. In the same year in Electrostal, Russia, she won a silver medal in the 3 metre springboard competition. In 2006, she placed 6th in the synchronised 3 metre springboard at the European Championships in Budapest. Later that year she won a silver medal at the Arena Diving Champions Cup in Stockholm.

In 2007, she won a bronze medal at the Arena Diving Champions Cup in the synchronised 3 metre springboard, and won the gold medal in the same event at the Italian Indoor Championships. She also took part in the FINA World Championships in Melbourne, Australia.

In August 2007 Batki won the gold medal in the 1 metre springboard competition at the XXIV Universiade in Bangkok, Thailand, sharing the same score as Ukrainian diver Maria Voloschenko.

In February 2008, Batki qualified for the 2008 Summer Olympics by placing 5th in the synchronised 3 metre springboard competition with Francesca Dallapè, at the FINA World Cup in Beijing. At the Olympics, Batki and Dallapé placed 6th.

In August 2010, she won the silver medal in the 10 metres platform at the European Championships in Budapest, Hungary with a score of 343.80, just 11 points behind the gold medallist Christin Steuer, from Germany.

In March 2011_{,} Batki won her first gold medal in a European Championship, at the 2nd Arena European Diving Championships in Turin, with a new personal record. With this result, she qualified for the 2012 Summer Olympics in London, where she placed 8th in the 10 m platform final. She also competed in the 2016 Summer Olympics in Rio where she placed 26th in the 10 metre platform event.

Batki considered retiring after the 2016 Olympics, but her performance had been hampered by a thumb injury and she decided to continue diving, with a new coach Domenico Rinaldi. Her competitive diving career continued until the 2020 Summer Olympics. From 2017 to 2021 Batki continued to compete and win medals. She won gold medals at FINA Grand Prix events in Italy in July 2017, July 2018 and June 2019. In August 2021, and at the age of 33, Batki placed 27th in the 10 metre platform event at the Tokyo Olympics.
