= Laura Marino =

French diver

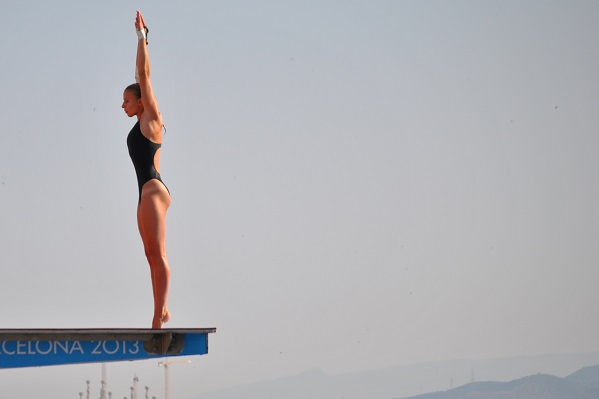
- Marino at the World Championships in Barcelona in 2013

Personal information
- Born: 2 July 1993 (age 33) Lyon, France

Sport
- Sport: Diving
Medal record
Women's diving
Representing France
World Aquatics Championships
Gold medal – first place	2017 Budapest	Team event

Laura Marino (born 2 July 1993) is a French female diver.

She competed at the 2015 World Aquatics Championships, and the 2016 Summer Olympics.

In 2017, Marino failed to qualify for the individual 10m event but won the gold medal at the World Aquatics Championships along with her partner Matthieu Rosset in the team event with a total of 406.40 points.

== See also ==
- France at the 2015 World Aquatics Championships
