= Diving at the 2023 World Aquatics Championships =

- Host city: Fukuoka, Japan
- Date(s): 14–22 July
- Venue(s): Fukuoka Prefectural Pool
- Events: 13

The diving events at the 2023 World Aquatics Championships were held from 14 to 22 July 2023 at the Fukuoka Prefectural Pool in Fukuoka, Japan.

== Schedule ==
13 events were held.

All times are local (UTC+9).

Date	Time	Event
14 July 2023	10:00	1m Springboard Women
14 July 2023	15:00	1m Springboard Men
15 July 2023	09:00	3m Springboard Synchro Men
15 July 2023	12:30	10m Platform Synchro Mixed
15 July 2023	15:30	1m Springboard Women
15 July 2023	18:00	3m Springboard Synchro Men
16 July 2023	10:00	10m Platform Synchro Women
16 July 2023	14:30	1m Springboard Men
16 July 2023	18:00	10m Platform Synchro Women
17 July 2023	09:00	3m Springboard Synchro Women
17 July 2023	12:30	10m Platform Synchro Men
17 July 2023	15:30	3m Springboard Synchro Women
17 July 2023	18:00	10m Platform Synchro Men
18 July 2023	10:00	10m Platform Women
18 July 2023	14:30	10m Platform Women Semifinal
18 July 2023	18:00	3m / 10m Team Event
19 July 2023	09:00	3m Springboard Men
19 July 2023	15:30	3m Springboard Men Semifinal
19 July 2023	18:00	10m Platform Women
20 July 2023	09:00	3m Springboard Women
20 July 2023	14:30	3m Springboard Women Semifinal
20 July 2023	18:00	3m Springboard Men
21 July 2023	09:00	10m Platform Men
21 July 2023	15:30	10m Platform Men Semifinal
21 July 2023	18:00	3m Springboard Women
22 July 2023	15:30	3m Springboard Synchro Mixed
22 July 2023	18:30	10m Platform Men

== Medal summary ==
=== Medal table ===
* Host nation (Japan)

Rank	Nation	Gold	Silver	Bronze	Total
1	China	12	4	3	19
2	Australia	1	1	0	2
3	Mexico	0	4	2	6
4	Great Britain	0	3	0	3
5	Ukraine	0	1	0	1
6	Canada	0	0	2	2
6	Italy	0	0	2	2
8	France	0	0	1	1
8	Germany	0	0	1	1
8	Japan*	0	0	1	1
8	United States	0	0	1	1
Totals (11 entries)		13	13	13	39

=== Men ===
Event	Gold		Silver		Bronze	
1 metre springboard	Peng Jianfeng; China	440.45	Osmar Olvera; Mexico	428.85	Zheng Jiuyuan; China	418.30
3 metre springboard	Wang Zongyuan; China	538.10	Osmar Olvera; Mexico	507.50	Long Daoyi; China	499.75
10 metre platform	Cassiel Rousseau; Australia	520.85	Lian Junjie; China	512.35	Yang Hao; China	504.00
Synchronized; 3 metre springboard	China; Long Daoyi; Wang Zongyuan	456.33	Great Britain; Anthony Harding; Jack Laugher	424.62	France; Jules Bouyer; Alexis Jandard	389.10
Synchronized; 10 metre platform	China; Lian Junjie; Yang Hao	477.75	Ukraine; Kirill Boliukh; Oleksiy Sereda	439.32	Mexico; Kevin Berlín; Randal Willars	434.16

=== Women ===
Event	Gold		Silver		Bronze	
1 metre springboard	Lin Shan; China	318.60	Li Yajie; China	306.35	Aranza Vázquez; Mexico	285.05
3 metre springboard	Chen Yiwen; China	359.50	Chang Yani; China	341.50	Pamela Ware; Canada	332.00
10 metre platform	Chen Yuxi; China	457.85	Quan Hongchan; China	445.60	Caeli McKay; Canada	340.25
Synchronized; 3 metre springboard	China; Chang Yani; Chen Yiwen	341.94	Great Britain; Yasmin Harper; Scarlett Mew Jensen	296.58	Italy; Elena Bertocchi; Chiara Pellacani	285.99
Synchronized; 10 metre platform	China; Chen Yuxi; Quan Hongchan	369.84	Great Britain; Andrea Spendolini-Sirieix; Lois Toulson	311.76	United States; Jessica Parratto; Delaney Schnell	294.42

=== Mixed ===
Event	Gold		Silver		Bronze	
3 metre springboard	China; Zhu Zifeng; Lin Shan	326.10	Australia; Domonic Bedggood; Maddison Keeney	307.38	Italy; Matteo Santoro; Chiara Pellacani	294.12
10 metre platform	China; Wang Feilong; Zhang Jiaqi	339.54	Mexico; Diego Balleza; Viviana del Ángel	313.44	Japan; Hiroki Ito; Minami Itahashi	305.34
Team	China; Bai Yuming; Zheng Jiuyuan; Si Yajie; Zhang Minjie	489.65	Mexico; Gabriela Agúndez; Jahir Ocampo; Randal Willars; Aranza Vázquez	455.35	Germany; Christina Wassen; Moritz Wesemann; Lena Hentschel; Timo Barthel	432.15
