= Diving at the 2023 World Aquatics Championships – Men's synchronized 10 metre platform =

Men's synchronized 10 metre platform at the 2023 World Aquatics Championships
- Venue: Fukuoka Prefectural Pool
- Location: Fukuoka, Japan
- Dates: 17 July (preliminary and final)
- Competitors: 36 from 18 nations
- Teams: 18
- Winning points: 477.75

Medalists
gold medal	Lian Junjie; Yang Hao	China
silver medal	Kirill Boliukh; Oleksiy Sereda	Ukraine
bronze medal	Kevin Berlín; Randal Willars	Mexico

The men's synchronized 10 metre platform competition at the 2023 World Aquatics Championships was held on 17 July 2023.

== Results ==
The preliminary round was started at 12:30. The final was held at 18:00.

Rank	Nation	Divers	Preliminary		Final	
Rank	Nation	Divers	Points	Rank	Points	Rank
1st place, gold medalist(s)	China	Lian Junjie; Yang Hao	463.65	1	477.75	1
2nd place, silver medalist(s)	Ukraine	Kirill Boliukh; Oleksiy Sereda	404.22	4	439.32	2
3rd place, bronze medalist(s)	Mexico	Kevin Berlín; Randal Willars	411.78	3	434.16	3
4	Great Britain	Matty Lee; Noah Williams	429.18	2	419.82	4
5	Australia	Domonic Bedggood; Cassiel Rousseau	377.70	6	407.46	5
6	United States	Brandon Loschiavo; Jordan Rzepka	359.46	10	375.90	6
7	Poland	Filip Jachim; Robert Łukaszewicz	360.21	9	371.58	7
8	Italy	Riccardo Giovannini; Eduard Timbretti Gugiu	367.35	8	368.79	8
9	Germany	Timo Barthel; Jaden Eikermann	381.27	5	364.80	9
10	South Korea	Kim Yeong-taek; Yi Jae-gyeong	348.78	12	347.88	10
11	Austria	Anton Knoll; Dariush Lotfi	354.75	11	347.61	11
12	Malaysia	Bertrand Rhodict Lises; Enrique Harold	376.80	7	310.44	12
13	Greece	Nikolaos Molvalis; Athanasios Tsirikos	348.45	13	Did not advance	
14	Brazil	Diogo Silva; Isaac Souza	345.30	14	Did not advance	
15	New Zealand	Arno Lee; Luke Sipkes	306.81	15	Did not advance	
16	Indonesia	Andriyan; Adityo Restu Putra	300.03	16	Did not advance	
17	France	Loïs Szymczak; Gary Hunt	285.51	17	Did not advance	
18	Macau	He Heung Wing; Zhang Hoi	215.79	18	Did not advance	

== Paris 2024 Olympic qualification ==
The 10 metre synchronised platform event was a direct qualification event for the diving program at the 2024 Olympic Games. The top three teams are awarded quota places for the men's 10 metre synchronised platform event in Paris.

Qualification event	Qualified NOCs
Men's synchronized 10 metre platform	China
Men's synchronized 10 metre platform	Ukraine
Men's synchronized 10 metre platform	Mexico
Total	3 Quotas (6 Divers)
