= Diving at the 2024 World Aquatics Championships – Men's synchronized 10 metre platform =

Men's synchronized 10 metre platform at the 2024 World Aquatics Championships
- Venue: Hamad Aquatic Centre
- Location: Doha, Qatar
- Dates: 8 February
- Competitors: 44 from 22 nations
- Teams: 22
- Winning points: 470.76

Medalists
gold medal	Lian Junjie; Yang Hao	China
silver medal	Tom Daley; Noah Williams	Great Britain
bronze medal	Kirill Boliukh; Oleksiy Sereda	Ukraine

The Men's synchronized 10 metre platform competition at the 2024 World Aquatics Championships was held on 8 February 2024.

== Results ==
The final was started at 18:32.

Rank	Nation	Divers	Points
1st place, gold medalist(s)	China	Lian Junjie; Yang Hao	470.76
2nd place, silver medalist(s)	Great Britain	Tom Daley; Noah Williams	422.37
3rd place, bronze medalist(s)	Ukraine	Kirill Boliukh; Oleksiy Sereda	406.47
4	Mexico	Kevin Berlín; Randal Willars	390.87
5	Canada	Rylan Wiens; Nathan Zsombor-Murray	388.20
6	Australia	Domonic Bedggood; Cassiel Rousseau	384.15
7	Germany	Timo Barthel; Jaden Eikermann	373.71
8	North Korea	Im Yong-myong; Ko Che-won	372.96
9	Malaysia	Bertrand Rhodict Lises; Enrique Harold	355.71
10	Italy	Andreas Sargent Larsen; Eduard Timbretti Gugiu	351.06
11	South Korea	Kim Yeong-taek; Shin Jung-whi	344.70
12	Poland	Filip Jachim; Robert Łukaszewicz	338.82
13	Spain	Carlos Camacho; Max Liñán	332.88
14	United States	Joshua Hedberg; Carson Tyler	324.51
15	Colombia	Alejandro Solarte; Sebastián Villa	324.27
16	Japan	Reo Nishida; Shuta Yamada	319.98
17	Austria	Anton Knoll; Dariush Lotfi	310.38
18	Indonesia	Andriyan; Adityo Restu Putra	306.96
19	France	Gary Hunt; Loïs Szymczak	295.83
20	New Zealand	Arno Lee; Luke Sipkes	269.64
21	Armenia	Arman Enokyan; Marat Grigoryan	225.12
22	Macau	He Heung Wing; Zhang Hoi	202.20
