= 2019 FINA Diving World Series =

International diving competition series

The 2019 FINA Diving World Series, also known as the FINA/CNSG Diving World Series for sponsorship reasons, took place from 1 March to 19 May 2019. It was the tenth edition of the FINA-sanctioned invitational series, and included five events across three continents.

== Calendar ==
The calendar for the 2019 series was announced by FINA in July 2018.

Date	Location
March 1–3	(Japan) Sagamihara
March 7–9	(China) Beijing
April 26–28	(Canada) Montreal
May 10–12	(Russia) Kazan
May 17–19	(United Kingdom) London

== Event 1: (Japan) Sagamihara ==
The first event took place at the Sagamihara Green Pool in Sagamihara, Japan from 1–3 March.

=== Medal table ===
Rank	Nation	Gold	Silver	Bronze	Total
1	China (CHN)	10	2	1	13
2	Canada (CAN)	0	3	2	5
3	Russia (RUS)	0	2	1	3
4	Great Britain (GBR)	0	1	3	4
5	Mexico (MEX)	0	1	0	1
5	North Korea (PRK)	0	1	0	1
7	Australia (AUS)	0	0	2	2
8	Japan (JPN)	0	0	1	1
Totals (8 entries)		10	10	10	30

=== Medal summary ===
==== Men ====
Event	Gold	Silver	Bronze
3m Springboard	Xie Siyi (CHN)	Cao Yuan (CHN)	Jack Laugher (GBR)
10m Platform	Yang Jian (CHN)	Tom Daley (GBR)	Aleksandr Bondar (RUS)
Synchronised; 3m Springboard	Cao Yuan (CHN); Xie Siyi (CHN)	Jahir Ocampo (MEX); Rommel Pacheco (MEX)	Jack Laugher (GBR); Daniel Goodfellow (GBR)
Synchronised; 10m Platform	Cao Yuan (CHN); Chen Aisen (CHN)	Viktor Minibaev (RUS); Aleksandr Bondar (RUS)	Domonic Bedggood (AUS); Declan Stacey (AUS)

==== Women ====
Event	Gold	Silver	Bronze
3m Springboard	Shi Tingmao (CHN)	Wang Han (CHN)	Jennifer Abel (CAN)
10m Platform	Zhang Jiaqi (CHN)	Meaghan Benfeito (CAN)	Ren Qian (CHN)
Synchronised; 3m Springboard	Shi Tingmao (CHN); Wang Han (CHN)	Jennifer Abel (CAN); Mélissa Citrini-Beaulieu (CAN)	Anabelle Smith (AUS); Maddison Keeney (AUS)
Synchronised; 10m Platform	Zhang Jiaqi (CHN); Lu Wei (CHN)	Kim A-rim (PRK); Kim Mi-rae (PRK)	Caeli McKay (CAN); Meaghan Benfeito (CAN)

==== Mixed ====
Event	Gold	Silver	Bronze
Synchronised; 3m Springboard	Chang Yani (CHN); Yang Hao (CHN)	François Imbeau-Dulac (CAN); Jennifer Abel (CAN)	Grace Reid (GBR); Tom Daley (GBR)
Synchronised; 10m Platform	Lian Junjie (CHN); Si Yajie (CHN)	Nikita Shleikher (RUS); Yulia Timoshinina (RUS)	Minami Itahashi (JPN); Kazuki Murakami (JPN)

== Event 2: (China) Beijing ==
The second event took place at the Beijing National Aquatics Center in Beijing, China from 7–9 March.

=== Medal table ===
Rank	Nation	Gold	Silver	Bronze	Total
1	China (CHN)	10	4	0	14
2	Russia (RUS)	0	2	1	3
3	Canada (CAN)	0	1	5	6
4	Australia (AUS)	0	1	1	2
5	Mexico (MEX)	0	1	0	1
5	North Korea (PRK)	0	1	0	1
7	Great Britain (GBR)	0	0	3	3
Totals (7 entries)		10	10	10	30

=== Medal summary ===
==== Men ====
Event	Gold	Silver	Bronze
3m Springboard	Cao Yuan (CHN)	Xie Siyi (CHN)	Jack Laugher (GBR)
10m Platform	Yang Jian (CHN)	Chen Aisen (CHN)	Aleksandr Bondar (RUS)
Synchronised; 3m Springboard	Cao Yuan (CHN); Xie Siyi (CHN)	Jahir Ocampo (MEX); Rommel Pacheco (MEX)	Philippe Gagné (CAN); François Imbeau-Dulac (CAN)
Synchronised; 10m Platform	Chen Aisen (CHN); Cao Yuan (CHN)	Aleksandr Bondar (RUS); Viktor Minibaev (RUS)	Domonic Bedggood (AUS); Declan Stacey (AUS)

==== Women ====
Event	Gold	Silver	Bronze
3m Springboard	Wang Han (CHN)	Shi Tingmao (CHN)	Jennifer Abel (CAN)
10m Platform	Zhang Jiaqi (CHN)	Ren Qian (CHN)	Meaghan Benfeito (CAN)
Synchronised; 3m Springboard	Wang Han (CHN); Shi Tingmao (CHN)	Anabelle Smith (AUS); Maddison Keeney (AUS)	Grace Reid (GBR); Katherine Torrance (GBR)
Synchronised; 10m Platform	Lu Wei (CHN); Zhang Jiaqi (CHN)	Kim A-rim (PRK); Kim Mi-rae (PRK)	Meaghan Benfeito (CAN); Caeli McKay (CAN)

==== Mixed ====
Event	Gold	Silver	Bronze
Synchronised; 3m Springboard	Yang Hao (CHN); Chang Yani (CHN)	François Imbeau-Dulac (CAN); Jennifer Abel (CAN)	Grace Reid (GBR); Tom Daley (GBR)
Synchronised; 10m Platform	Si Yajie (CHN); Lian Junjie (CHN)	Nikita Shleikher (RUS); Yulia Timoshinina (RUS)	Meaghan Benfeito (CAN); Nathan Zsombor-Murray (CAN)

== Event 3: (Canada) Montreal ==
The third event took place in at Montreal Olympic Pool in Montreal, Canada from 26–28 April.

=== Medal table ===
Rank	Nation	Gold	Silver	Bronze	Total
1	China (CHN)	8	3	3	14
2	Great Britain (GBR)	1	3	0	4
3	North Korea (PRK)	1	1	1	3
4	Canada (CAN)	0	2	1	3
5	Mexico (MEX)	0	1	1	2
6	Australia (AUS)	0	0	2	2
7	Russia (RUS)	0	0	1	1
7	United States (USA)	0	0	1	1
Totals (8 entries)		10	10	10	30

=== Medal summary ===
==== Men ====
Event	Gold	Silver	Bronze
3m Springboard	Xie Siyi (CHN)	Jack Laugher (GBR)	Cao Yuan (CHN)
10m Platform	Tom Daley (GBR)	Yang Jian (CHN)	Yang Hao (CHN)
Synchronised; 3m Springboard	Cao Yuan (CHN); Xie Siyi (CHN)	Jahir Ocampo (MEX); Rommel Pacheco (MEX)	Andrew Capobianco (USA); Michael Hixon (USA)
Synchronised; 10m Platform	Yang Hao (CHN); Lian Junjie (CHN)	Matty Lee (GBR); Tom Daley (GBR)	Andres Isaac Villarreal Tudon (MEX); Kevin Berlin Reyes (MEX)

==== Women ====
Event	Gold	Silver	Bronze
3m Springboard	Wang Han (CHN)	Shi Tingmao (CHN)	Maddison Keeney (AUS)
10m Platform	Lu Wei (CHN)	Si Yajie (CHN)	Kim Mi-rae (PRK)
Synchronised; 3m Springboard	Wang Han (CHN); Shi Tingmao (CHN)	Jennifer Abel (CAN); Mélissa Citrini-Beaulieu (CAN)	Anabelle Smith (AUS); Maddison Keeney (AUS)
Synchronised; 10m Platform	Jo Jin-mi (PRK); Kim Mi-rae (PRK)	Caeli McKay (CAN); Meaghan Benfeito (CAN)	Lu Wei (CHN); Zhang Jiaqi (CHN)

==== Mixed ====
Event	Gold	Silver	Bronze
Synchronised; 3m Springboard	Chang Yani (CHN); Yang Hao (CHN)	Grace Reid (GBR); Tom Daley (GBR)	Jennifer Abel (CAN); François Imbeau-Dulac (CAN)
Synchronised; 10m Platform	Lian Junjie (CHN); Si Yajie (CHN)	Hyon Il-myong (PRK); Jo Jin-mi (PRK)	Nikita Shleikher (RUS); Yulia Timoshinina (RUS)

== Event 4: (Russia) Kazan ==
The fourth event took place at Kazan Aquatics Palace in Kazan, Russia from 10–12 May.

=== Medal table ===
Rank	Nation	Gold	Silver	Bronze	Total
1	China (CHN)	5	3	3	11
2	North Korea (PRK)	1	2	0	3
3	Australia (AUS)	1	1	0	2
4	Great Britain (GBR)	1	0	3	4
5	Canada (CAN)	1	0	1	2
5	Ukraine (UKR)	1	0	1	2
7	Russia (RUS)	0	4	1	5
8	Mexico (MEX)	0	0	1	1
Totals (8 entries)		10	10	10	30

=== Medal summary ===
==== Men ====
Event	Gold	Silver	Bronze
3m Springboard	Jack Laugher (GBR)	Evgeny Kuznetsov (RUS)	Peng Jianfeng (CHN)
10m Platform	Yang Hao (CHN)	Aleksandr Bondar (RUS)	Tom Daley (GBR)
Synchronised; 3m Springboard	Oleh Kolodiy (UKR); Oleksandr Horshkovozov (UKR)	Nikita Shleikher (RUS); Evgeny Kuznetsov (RUS)	Juan Celaya-Hernandez (MEX); Yahel Castillo (MEX)
Synchronised; 10m Platform	Yang Hao (CHN); Lian Junjie (CHN)	Aleksandr Bondar (RUS); Viktor Minibaev (RUS)	Matty Lee (GBR); Tom Daley (GBR)

==== Women ====
Event	Gold	Silver	Bronze
3m Springboard	Jennifer Abel (CAN)	Lin Shan (CHN)	Chang Yani (CHN)
10m Platform	Kim Mi-rae (PRK)	Zhang Minjie (CHN)	Chen Yuxi (CHN)
Synchronised; 3m Springboard	Lin Shan (CHN); Chang Yani (CHN)	Anabelle Smith (AUS); Maddison Keeney (AUS)	Viktoriya Kesar (UKR); Hanna Pysmenska (UKR)
Synchronised; 10m Platform	Yuan Haoyan (CHN); Chang Yani (CHN)	Kim Mi-rae (PRK); Jo Jin-mi (PRK)	Ekaterina Beliaeva (RUS); Yulia Timoshinina (RUS)

==== Mixed ====
Event	Gold	Silver	Bronze
Synchronised; 3m Springboard	Domonic Bedggood (AUS); Maddison Keeney (AUS)	Chen Yiwen (CHN); Tai Xiaohu (CHN)	Tom Daley (GBR); Grace Reid (GBR)
Synchronised; 10m Platform	Duan Yu (CHN); Zhang Minjie (CHN)	Hyon Il-myong (PRK); Jo Jin-mi (PRK)	Vincent Riendeau (CAN); Caeli McKay (CAN)

== Event 5: (United Kingdom) London ==
The fifth event took place at London Aquatics Centre in London, Great Britain from 17–19 May.

=== Medal table ===
Rank	Nation	Gold	Silver	Bronze	Total
1	China (CHN)	5	4	1	10
2	Great Britain (GBR)	3	1	2	6
3	Australia (AUS)	2	1	0	3
4	North Korea (PRK)	0	2	1	3
5	Canada (CAN)	0	1	2	3
5	Russia (RUS)	0	1	2	3
7	Malaysia (MAS)	0	0	1	1
7	Ukraine (UKR)	0	0	1	1
Totals (8 entries)		10	10	10	30

=== Medal summary ===
==== Men ====
Event	Gold	Silver	Bronze
3m Springboard	Jack Laugher (GBR)	Daniel Goodfellow (GBR)	Wang Zongyuan (CHN)
10m Platform	Yang Hao (CHN)	Lian Junjie (CHN)	Tom Daley (GBR)
Synchronised; 3m Springboard	Wang Zongyuan (CHN); Wu Luxian (CHN)	Nikita Shleikher (RUS); Evgeny Kuznetsov (RUS)	Oleksandr Horshkovozov (UKR); Oleh Kolodiy (UKR)
Synchronised; 10m Platform	Tom Daley (GBR); Matty Lee (GBR)	Lian Junjie (CHN); Yang Hao (CHN)	Viktor Minibaev (RUS); Aleksandr Bondar (RUS)

==== Women ====
Event	Gold	Silver	Bronze
3m Springboard	Maddison Keeney (AUS)	Jennifer Abel (CAN)	Nur Dhabitah Sabri (MAS)
10m Platform	Chen Yuxi (CHN)	Zhang Minjie (CHN)	Kim Mi-rae (PRK)
Synchronised; 3m Springboard	Maddison Keeney (AUS); Anabelle Smith (AUS)	Chang Yani (CHN); Lin Shan (CHN)	Jennifer Abel (CAN); Mélissa Citrini-Beaulieu (CAN)
Synchronised; 10m Platform	Yuan Haoyan (CHN); Chen Yuxi (CHN)	Kim Mi-rae (PRK); Jo Jin-mi (PRK)	Eden Cheng (GBR); Lois Toulson (GBR)

==== Mixed ====
Event	Gold	Silver	Bronze
Synchronised; 3m Springboard	Grace Reid (GBR); Tom Daley (GBR)	Maddison Keeney (AUS); Domonic Bedggood (AUS)	Jennifer Abel (CAN); François Imbeau-Dulac (CAN)
Synchronised; 10m Platform	Zhang Minjie (CHN); Duan Yu (CHN)	Jo Jin-mi (PRK); Hyon Il-myong (PRK)	Yulia Timoshinina (RUS); Nikita Shleikher (RUS)
