= Diving at the 2022 World Aquatics Championships – Men's synchronized 10 metre platform =

Men's synchronized 10 metre platform at the 2022 World Aquatics Championships
- Venue: Danube Arena
- Location: Budapest, Hungary
- Dates: 28 June (preliminary and final)
- Competitors: 28 from 14 nations
- Teams: 14
- Winning points: 467.79

Medalists
gold medal	Lian Junjie; Yang Hao	China
silver medal	Matty Lee; Noah Williams	Great Britain
bronze medal	Rylan Wiens; Nathan Zsombor-Murray	Canada

The Men's synchronized 10 metre platform competition at the 2022 World Aquatics Championships was held on 28 June 2022.

== Results ==
The preliminary round was started on 28 June at 10:00. The final was started on 28 June at 19:00.

Green denotes finalists

Rank	Nation	Divers	Preliminary		Final	
Rank	Nation	Divers	Points	Rank	Points	Rank
1st place, gold medalist(s)	China	Lian Junjie; Yang Hao	452.25	1	467.79	1
2nd place, silver medalist(s)	Great Britain	Matty Lee; Noah Williams	379.26	3	427.71	2
3rd place, bronze medalist(s)	Canada	Rylan Wiens; Nathan Zsombor-Murray	377.88	4	417.12	3
4	Ukraine	Kirill Boliukh; Oleksiy Sereda	393.00	2	396.27	4
5	Germany	Timo Barthel; Jaden Eikermann	340.47	8	377.37	5
6	Cuba	Luis Cañabate; Carlos Ramos	336.69	9	371.01	6
7	Australia	Domonic Bedggood; Cassiel Rousseau	376.65	5	368.10	7
8	United States	Zachary Cooper; Maxwell Flory	328.38	10	358.17	8
9	Brazil	Kawan Pereira; Isaac Souza	354.45	7	329.79	9
10	Italy	Andreas Larsen; Eduard Timbretti	357.00	6	328.95	10
11	Malaysia	Hanis Nazirul Jaya Surya; Jellson Jabillin	311.85	12	322.35	11
12	Austria	Anton Knoll; Dariush Lotfi	314.52	11	316.20	12
13	New Zealand	Arno Lee; Luke Sipkes	257.82	13		
14	Uzbekistan	Botir Khasanov; Marsel Zaynetdinov	232.89	14		
