= Diving at the 2020 Summer Olympics – Men's 10 metre platform =

Men's 10-metre platform at the Games of the XXXII Olympiad
- Venue: Tokyo Aquatics Centre
- Date: 6 August (Preliminary); 7 August (Semi finals & Finals)
- Competitors: 29 from 18 nations
- Winning total: 582.35

Medalists
1st place, gold medalist(s)		Cao Yuan	China
2nd place, silver medalist(s)		Yang Jian	China
3rd place, bronze medalist(s)		Tom Daley	Great Britain

The men's 10-metre platform diving competition at the 2020 Summer Olympics in Tokyo was held on 6 to 7 August 2021 at the Tokyo Aquatics Centre. It was the 27th appearance of the event, which has been held at every Olympic Games since the 1904 Summer Olympics.

== Competition format ==
The competition will be held in three rounds:

- Preliminary round: All divers perform six dives; the top 18 divers advance to the semi-final.
- Semi-final: The 18 divers perform six dives; the scores of the qualifications are erased and the top 12 divers advance to the final.
- Final: The 12 divers perform six dives; the semi-final scores are erased and the top three divers win the gold, silver and bronze medals accordingly.

Within each round of six dives, one dive must be from each of the six groups (forward, back, reverse, inward, twisting, and armstand). Each dive is assigned a degree of difficulty based on somersaults, position, twists, approach, and entry. There is no limit to the degree of difficulty of dives; the most difficult dives calculated in the FINA rulebook (reverse 4 1/2 somersault in pike position and armstand reverse 4 somersault in pike position) are 4.8, but competitors could attempt more difficult dives. Scoring is done by a panel of seven judges. For each dive, each judge gives a score between 0 and 10 with 0.5-point increments. The top two and bottom two scores are discarded. The remaining three scores are summed and multiplied by the degree of difficulty to give a dive score. The six dive scores are summed to give the score for the round.

== Schedule ==
All times are Japan standard time (UTC+9)

Date	Time	Round
Friday, 6 August 2021	15:00	Preliminary
Saturday, 7 August 2021	10:00; 15:00	Semifinal; Final

== Qualification ==
The top 12 divers at the 2019 World Aquatics Championships earned a quota spot for their NOC. The top 1 diver at each of the 5 continental championships earned a spot (excluding divers who earned a spot at the World Championships and divers from NOCs that had already earned two spots). Additional quota places go to the next best finishers in the 2020 FINA World Cup (with the same limitations) until the maximum number of divers is reached. Divers must be at least 14 years old by the end of 2020 to compete.

== Results ==
Rank	Diver	Nation	Preliminary		Semifinal		Final						
Rank	Diver	Nation	Points	Rank	Points	Rank	Dive 1	Dive 2	Dive 3	Dive 4	Dive 5	Dive 6	Points
1st place, gold medalist(s)	Cao Yuan	China	529.30	2	513.70	1	102.00	81.60	97.20	97.20	101.75	102.60	582.35
2nd place, silver medalist(s)	Yang Jian	China	546.90	1	480.85	2	90.10	94.50	89.25	91.20	102.60	112.75 (Note: This dive became the highest scoring dive in Olympic history, surpassing Australia's Matthew Mitcham's 112.10 point dive at the 2008 Summer Olympics in Beijing.)	580.40
3rd place, bronze medalist(s)	Tom Daley	Great Britain	453.70	4	462.90	4	98.60	91.20	91.80	80.50	94.35	91.80	548.25
4	Aleksandr Bondar	ROC	513.85	3	464.10	3	75.20	91.80	85.75	81.00	94.35	86.40	514.50
5	Viktor Minibaev	ROC	391.95	14	447.50	5	68.80	91.80	91.80	73.80	83.25	86.40	495.85
6	Oleksiy Sereda	Ukraine	435.90	6	416.05	7	83.20	79.20	88.20	56.10	75.00	80.00	461.70
7	Rikuto Tamai	Japan	374.25	16	413.65	8	72.00	86.40	75.85	86.40	35.70	75.60	431.95
8	Cassiel Rousseau	Australia	423.55	8	444.10	6	57.60	61.20	74.25	76.50	72.00	88.80	430.35
9	Jordan Windle	United States	390.05	15	409.80	9	68.80	72.60	39.60	88.80	69.70	68.40	407.90
10	Kawan Pereira	Brazil	371.65	17	400.40	12	60.80	79.20	46.20	79.55	56.10	72.00	393.85
11	Brandon Loschiavo	United States	403.85	11	409.75	10	67.20	59.40	48.60	69.70	66.60	72.15	383.65
12	Andrés Villareal	Mexico	410.30	9	405.55	11	67.20	59.40	59.50	42.50	72.15	81.00	381.75
13	Nathan Zsombor-Murray	Canada	443.85	5	397.85	13	Did not advance						
14	Rafael Quintero	Puerto Rico	396.90	12	397.55	14	Did not advance						
15	Kim Yeong-taek	South Korea	366.80	18	374.90	15	Did not advance						
16	Woo Ha-ram	South Korea	427.25	7	374.50	16	Did not advance						
17	Timo Barthel	Germany	395.70	13	364.50	17	Did not advance						
18	Sebastián Villa	Colombia	407.30	10	341.40	18	Did not advance						
19	Rylan Wiens	Canada	366.70	19	Did not advance								
20	Isaac Souza	Brazil	339.30	20	Did not advance								
21	Jaden Eikermann	Germany	330.75	21	Did not advance								
22	Óscar Ariza	Venezuela	327.05	22	Did not advance								
23	Mohab El-Kordy	Egypt	318.55	23	Did not advance								
24	Iván García	Mexico	316.95	24	Did not advance								
25	Reo Nishida	Japan	314.30	25	Did not advance								
26	Jonathan Chan	Singapore	311.15	26	Did not advance								
27	Noah Williams	Great Britain	309.55	27	Did not advance								
28	Sam Fricker	Australia	306.50	28	Did not advance								
29	Matthieu Rosset	France	275.70	29	Did not advance								
