= Diving at the 2020 European Aquatics Championships – Men's 10 m synchro platform =

Men's 10 m synchro platform at the 2020 European Aquatics Championships
- Venue: Danube Arena
- Dates: 15 May 2021
- Competitors: 16 from 8 nations
- Teams: 8
- Winning points: 477.57

Medalists
gold medal	Tom Daley; Matty Lee	Great Britain
silver medal	Aleksandr Bondar; Viktor Minibaev	Russia
bronze medal	Timo Barthel; Patrick Hausding	Germany

The Men's 10 m synchro platform competition of the 2020 European Aquatics Championships was held on 15 May 2021.

== Results ==
The final was started at 17:00.

Rank	Nation	Divers	Points						
Rank	Nation	Divers	T1	T2	T3	T4	T5	T6	Total
1st place, gold medalist(s)	Great Britain	Tom Daley; Matty Lee	52.80	54.00	86.40	97.20	92.82	94.35	477.57
2nd place, silver medalist(s)	Russia	Aleksandr Bondar; Viktor Minibaev	54.00	54.00	79.56	95.04	93.24	96.12	471.96
3rd place, bronze medalist(s)	Germany	Timo Barthel; Patrick Hausding	52.80	50.40	76.80	79.92	87.72	76.68	424.32
4	Armenia	Vartan Bayanduryan; Vladimir Harutyunyan	48.00	49.80	71.04	67.50	78.84	70.20	385.38
5	Ukraine	Oleh Serbin; Oleksii Sereda	51.60	53.40	76.80	48.51	71.10	80.64	382.05
6	Italy	Andreas Sargent Larsen; Eduard Timbretti Gugiu	48.60	49.80	70.20	58.41	76.23	63.36	366.60
7	Greece	Nikolaos Molvalis; Athanasios Tsirikos	51.00	51.00	59.40	63.51	59.52	72.96	357.39
8	Belarus	Artsiom Barouski; Uladzislau Sonin	46.80	47.40	69.12	62.10	56.43	63.36	345.21
