= Diving at the 2022 European Aquatics Championships – Men's 10 m platform =

International sporting competition

Men's 10 m platform at the 2022 European Aquatics Championships
- Venue: Foro Italico
- Dates: 21 August
- Competitors: 15 from 10 nations
- Winning points: 493.55

Medalists
gold medal	Oleksiy Sereda	Ukraine
silver medal	Noah Williams	Great Britain
bronze medal	Ben Cutmore	Great Britain

The Men's 10 m platform competition of the 2022 European Aquatics Championships was held on 21 August 2022.

== Results ==
The preliminary round was started at 10:00. The final was held at 17:25.

Green denotes finalists

Rank	Diver	Nationality	Preliminary		Final	
Rank	Diver	Nationality	Points	Rank	Points	Rank
1st place, gold medalist(s)	Oleksiy Sereda	Ukraine	408.25	2	493.55	1
2nd place, silver medalist(s)	Noah Williams	Great Britain	373.35	5	459.00	2
3rd place, bronze medalist(s)	Ben Cutmore	Great Britain	351.15	9	438.35	3
4	Andreas Sargent Larsen	Italy	396.80	3	417.20	4
5	Yevhen Naumenko	Ukraine	389.65	4	406.65	5
6	Jaden Eikermann	Germany	373.30	6	397.50	6
7	Timo Barthel	Germany	429.30	1	375.60	7
8	Robert Łukaszewicz	Poland	350.80	11	344.25	8
9	Eduard Timbretti Gugiu	Italy	363.80	8	333.85	9
10	Carlos Camacho	Spain	365.15	7	333.80	10
11	Athanasios Tsirikos	Greece	350.85	10	328.15	11
12	Vladimir Harutyunyan	Armenia	332.90	12	288.60	12
13	Nikolaos Molvalis	Greece	312.55	13		
14	Anton Knoll	Austria	286.95	14		
15	Dimitar Isaev	Bulgaria	265.25	15		
