= Diving at the 2022 European Aquatics Championships – Team =

Team at the 2022 European Aquatics Championships
- Venue: Foro Italico
- Dates: 15 August
- Competitors: 24 from 6 nations
- Teams: 6
- Winning points: 402.55

Medalists
gold medal	Eduard Timbretti Gugiu; Sarah Jodoin Di Maria; Andreas Sargent Larsen; Chiara Pellacani	Italy
silver medal	Kseniia Bailo; Kirill Boliukh; Viktoriya Kesar; Danylo Konovalov	Ukraine
bronze medal	James Heatly; Noah Williams; Andrea Spendolini-Sirieix; Grace Reid	Great Britain

The Team competition of the 2022 European Aquatics Championships was held on 15 August 2022.

== Results ==
The final started at 13:00.

Rank	Nation	Divers	Points						
Rank	Nation	Divers	T1	T2	T3	T4	T5	T6	Total
1st place, gold medalist(s)	Italy	Eduard Timbretti Gugiu; Sarah Jodoin Di Maria; Andreas Sargent Larsen; Chiara Pellacani	58.50	63.00	66.00	72.00	75.85	67.20	402.55
2nd place, silver medalist(s)	Ukraine	Kseniia Bailo; Kirill Boliukh; Viktoriya Kesar; Danylo Konovalov	57.00	75.25	55.50	76.80	64.00	70.50	399.05
3rd place, bronze medalist(s)	Great Britain	James Heatly; Noah Williams; Andrea Spendolini-Sirieix; Grace Reid	58.50	72.20	54.00	60.20	77.40	62.40	384.70
4	Spain	Valeria Antolino; Alberto Arévalo; Carlos Camacho; Rocío Velázquez	58.80	79.80	54.00	40.60	72.00	68.80	374.00
5	Germany	Timo Barthel; Elena Wassen; Lou Massenberg; Tina Punzel	58.50	63.00	69.75	64.00	49.50	62.40	367.15
6	France	Jules Bouyer; Jade Gillet; Naïs Gillet; Gary Hunt	29.40	78.75	54.60	51.30	51.80	51.30	317.15
