= Diving at the 2020 European Aquatics Championships – Mixed 10 m platform synchro =

Mixed 10 m platform synchro at the 2020 European Aquatics Championships
- Venue: Danube Arena
- Dates: 11 May 2021
- Competitors: 10 from 5 nations
- Teams: 5
- Winning points: 325.68

Medalists
gold medal	Kseniia Bailo; Oleksii Sereda	Ukraine
silver medal	Andrea Spendolini-Sirieix; Noah Williams	Great Britain
bronze medal	Ekaterina Beliaeva; Viktor Minibaev	Russia

The Mixed 10 m platform synchro competition of the 2020 European Aquatics Championships was held on 11 May 2021.

== Results ==
The final was started at 19:30.

Rank	Nation	Divers	Points					
Rank	Nation	Divers	T1	T2	T3	T4	T5	Total
1st place, gold medalist(s)	Ukraine	Kseniia Bailo; Oleksii Sereda	50.40	48.60	70.20	80.64	75.84	325.68
2nd place, silver medalist(s)	Great Britain	Andrea Spendolini-Sirieix; Noah Williams	49.20	48.60	68.40	72.00	69.12	307.32
3rd place, bronze medalist(s)	Russia	Ekaterina Beliaeva; Viktor Minibaev	51.00	48.00	71.10	65.28	67.20	302.58
4	Germany	Christina Wassen; Patrick Hausding	47.40	49.20	70.08	51.30	71.04	289.02
5	Italy	Maia Biginelli; Riccardo Giovannini	48.60	47.40	57.96	54.90	64.32	273.18
