= Diving at the 2018 Commonwealth Games – Men's synchronised 10 metre platform =

Men's synchronised 10 metre platform at the 2018 Commonwealth Games
- Venue: Gold Coast Aquatic Centre
- Date: April 13
- Competitors: 12 from 5 nations
- Winning sore: 405.81

Medalists
gold medal	Tom Daley; Daniel Goodfellow	England
silver medal	Matthew Dixon; Noah Williams	England
bronze medal	Domonic Bedggood; Dec Stacey	Australia

The men's synchronised 10 metre platform was part of the Diving at the 2018 Commonwealth Games program. The competition was held on 13 April 2018 at Gold Coast Aquatic Centre in the Gold Coast.

== Schedule ==
All times are AEST (UTC+10)

Date	Time	Round
13 April 2018	11:52	Finals

== Format ==
A single round was held, with each team making six dives. Eleven judges scored each dive: three for each diver, and five for synchronisation. Only the middle score counted for each diver, with the middle three counting for synchronisation. These five scores were averaged, multiplied by 3, and multiplied by the dive's degree of difficulty to give a total dive score. The scores for each of the five dives were summed to give a final score.

== Results ==
Results:

Rank	Nation	Dives						Total
Rank	Nation	1	2	3	4	5	6	Total
1st place, gold medalist(s)	England; Tom Daley; Daniel Goodfellow	51.00	46.80	77.52	78.72	90.72	61.05	405.81
2nd place, silver medalist(s)	England; Matthew Dixon; Noah Williams	50.40	46.20	80.64	82.17	65.70	74.88	399.99
3rd place, bronze medalist(s)	Australia; Domonic Bedggood; Dec Stacey	53.40	48.60	67.20	71.40	66.60	90.72	397.92
4	Malaysia; Jellson Jabillin; Hanis Jaya Surya	49.80	53.40	67.20	66.60	72.00	76.80	385.80
5	Scotland; James Heatly; Lucas Thomson	50.40	48.00	70.56	71.04	57.60	72.00	369.60
6	Canada; Bryden Hattie; Rylan Wiens	46.20	46.80	62.10	77.76	64.35	72.00	369.21
