= 2021 FINA Diving World Cup =

2021 edition of the biennial FINA diving competition

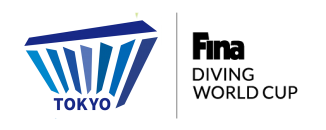
- Host city: Tokyo, Japan
- Date: May 1–6, 2021
- Venue: Tokyo Aquatics Centre
- Nations: 28
- Website: FINA event page

The 2021 FINA Diving World Cup was scheduled to take place in Tokyo, Japan, from 21 to 26 April 2020. It was to be the 22nd edition of the biennial diving competition, and the first time this specific FINA event was to be held in Tokyo and Japan. The venue was to be the Tokyo Aquatics Centre, and the final qualifying diving event for the 2020 Summer Olympics.

The event was postponed in response to the COVID-19 pandemic, after consulting with the International Olympic Committee. This followed the cancellation of the Beijing stop for the FINA Diving World Series in February 2020, and suspension of all other FINA events in March.

The competition was scheduled to take place on 18–23 April 2021. However on 2 April 2021, it was reported by BBC Sport that the event was "under review" and likely to be cancelled, citing COVID-19-related concerns and logistical costs, a state of emergency declared over novel SARS-CoV-2 variants, and that the Japanese government "did not take all the necessary measures" to ensure a fair and successful competition. On 9 April 2021 it was announced that the 2021 Fina Diving World Cup would take place on 1–6 May.

== Schedule ==
All times are local Japan Standard Time (UTC+9) and based on approximate entry numbers. They will be subject to revision.

| Day | Date | Event | Time |
|---|---|---|---|
| 1 | 1 May | 3m Synchro Prelim (Women's) | 10:00 |
| 1 | 1 May | 10m Synchro Prelim (Men's) | 12:30 |
| 1 | 1 May | 3m Synchro Finals (Women's) | 16:00 |
| 1 | 1 May | Victory Ceremony | |
| 1 | 1 May | 10m Synchro Finals (Men's) | 18:00 |
| 1 | 1 May | Victory Ceremony | |
| 2 | 2 May | 10m Synchro Prelim (Women's) | 10:00 |
| 2 | 2 May | 3m Synchro Prelim (Men's) | 12:30 |
| 2 | 2 May | 10m Synchro Finals (Women's) | 16:00 |
| 2 | 2 May | Victory Ceremony | |
| 2 | 2 May | 3m Synchro Finals (Men's) | 18:00 |
| 2 | 2 May | Victory Ceremony | |
| 3 | 3 May | 3m Prelims (Women's) | 9:00 |
| 3 | 3 May | 10m Prelims (Men's) | 12:30 |
| 3 | 3 May | 3m Semi-finals (Women's) | 16:45 |
| 3 | 3 May | 10m Semi-finals (Men's) | 18:45 |
| 4 | 4 May | 10m Prelims (Women's) | 10:00 |
| 4 | 4 May | 3m Finals (Women's) | 16:00 |
| 4 | 4 May | Victory Ceremony | |
| 4 | 4 May | 10m Finals (Men's) | 18:00 |
| 4 | 4 May | Victory Ceremony | |
| 5 | 5 May | 3m Prelims (Men's) | 10:00 |
| 5 | 5 May | 10m Semi-finals (Women's) | 16:00 |
| 5 | 5 May | 10m Finals (Women's) | 18:00 |
| 5 | 5 May | Victory Ceremony | |
| 6 | 6 May | 3m Semi-finals (Men's) | 10:00 |
| 6 | 6 May | 3m Finals (Men's) | 16:00 |
| 6 | 6 May | Victory Ceremony | |

== Medal summary ==
=== Men's events ===
| Event | Gold | | Silver | | Bronze | |
|---|---|---|---|---|---|---|
| 3m springboard | Germany; Martin Wolfram | 467.75 | Great Britain; James Heatly | 461.25 | France; Alexis Jandard | 434.25 |
| 10m platform | Great Britain; Tom Daley | 541.70 | Mexico; Randal Willars | 514.70 | Canada; Rylan Wiens | 488.55 |
| Synchronized; 3m Springboard | Great Britain; Daniel Goodfellow and Jack Laugher | 440.94 | Germany; Patrick Hausding and Lars Rüdiger | 433.92 | Russia; Evgeny Kuznetsov and Nikita Shleikher | 415.86 |
| Synchronized; 10m Platform | Great Britain; Tom Daley and Matty Lee | 453.60 | Mexico; Iván García and Randal Willars | 405.69 | Canada; Vincent Riendeau and Nathan Zsombor-Murray | 393.81 |

=== Women's events ===
| Event | Gold | | Silver | | Bronze | |
|---|---|---|---|---|---|---|
| 3m springboard | Chen Yiwen; China | 383.55 | Sarah Bacon; United States | 348.75 | Chang Yani; China | 344.40 |
| 10m platform | Pandelela Rinong; Malaysia | 355.70 | Matsuri Arai; Japan | 342.00 | Caeli McKay; Canada | 338.55 |
| Synchronized; 3m Springboard | China; Chang Yani and Chen Yiwen | 317.16 | Canada; Jennifer Abel and Mélissa Citrini-Beaulieu | 289.98 | Italy; Elena Bertocchi and Chiara Pellacani | 283.77 |
| Synchronized; 10m Platform | Canada; Meaghan Benfeito and Caeli McKay | 305.94 | Great Britain; Eden Cheng and Lois Toulson | 302.88 | Germany; Tina Punzel and Christina Wassen | 292.86 |

=== Medal table ===
* Host nation (Japan)

| Rank | Nation | Gold | Silver | Bronze | Total |
|---|---|---|---|---|---|
| 1 | Great Britain | 3 | 2 | 0 | 5 |
| 2 | China | 2 | 0 | 1 | 3 |
| 3 | Canada | 1 | 1 | 3 | 5 |
| 4 | Germany | 1 | 1 | 1 | 3 |
| 5 | Malaysia | 1 | 0 | 0 | 1 |
| 6 | Mexico | 0 | 2 | 0 | 2 |
| 7 | Japan* | 0 | 1 | 0 | 1 |
| 7 | United States | 0 | 1 | 0 | 1 |
| 9 | France | 0 | 0 | 1 | 1 |
| 9 | Italy | 0 | 0 | 1 | 1 |
| 9 | Russia | 0 | 0 | 1 | 1 |
| Totals (11 entries) | | 8 | 8 | 8 | 24 |

== Participating countries ==
A total of 47 countries have confirmed to participate in the event

- Armenia (2)
- Austria (3)
- Belgium (1)
- Belarus (3)
- Brazil (8)
- Canada (10)
- Chile (3)
- China (2)
- Colombia (7)
- Croatia (1)
- Cuba (2)
- Denmark (1)
- Dominican Republic (2)
- Egypt (4)
- France (4)
- Georgia (3)
- Germany (11)
- Great Britain (14)
- Greece (3)
- Hungary (1)
- India (1)
- Iran (2)
- Ireland (5)
- Italy (10)
- Jamaica (1)
- Japan (13)
- Kazakhstan (1)
- Kuwait (3)
- Malaysia (10)
- Mexico (12)
- Netherlands (2)
- New Zealand (2)
- Norway (2)
- Poland (3)
- Puerto Rico (4)
- Romania (2)
- Russia (10)
- Singapore (7)
- South Africa (2)
- South Korea (8)
- Spain (7)
- Switzerland (5)
- Sweden (3)
- Ukraine (11)
- United States (9)
- Venezuela (5)

=== Invitational Teams ===
- (Japan) Osaka Tōin Junior and Senior High School (6)
- United States U-20 (5)
- (United Kingdom) University of Oxford (7)
- (Japan) Tokyo International University (5)
- Japan U-18 (5)
- (Spain) Real Madrid (5)
- (United States) Michigan Wolverines (5)
- Universidad Nacional de Colombia (4)
