= Kirill Boliukh =

Ukrainian diver (born 2007)

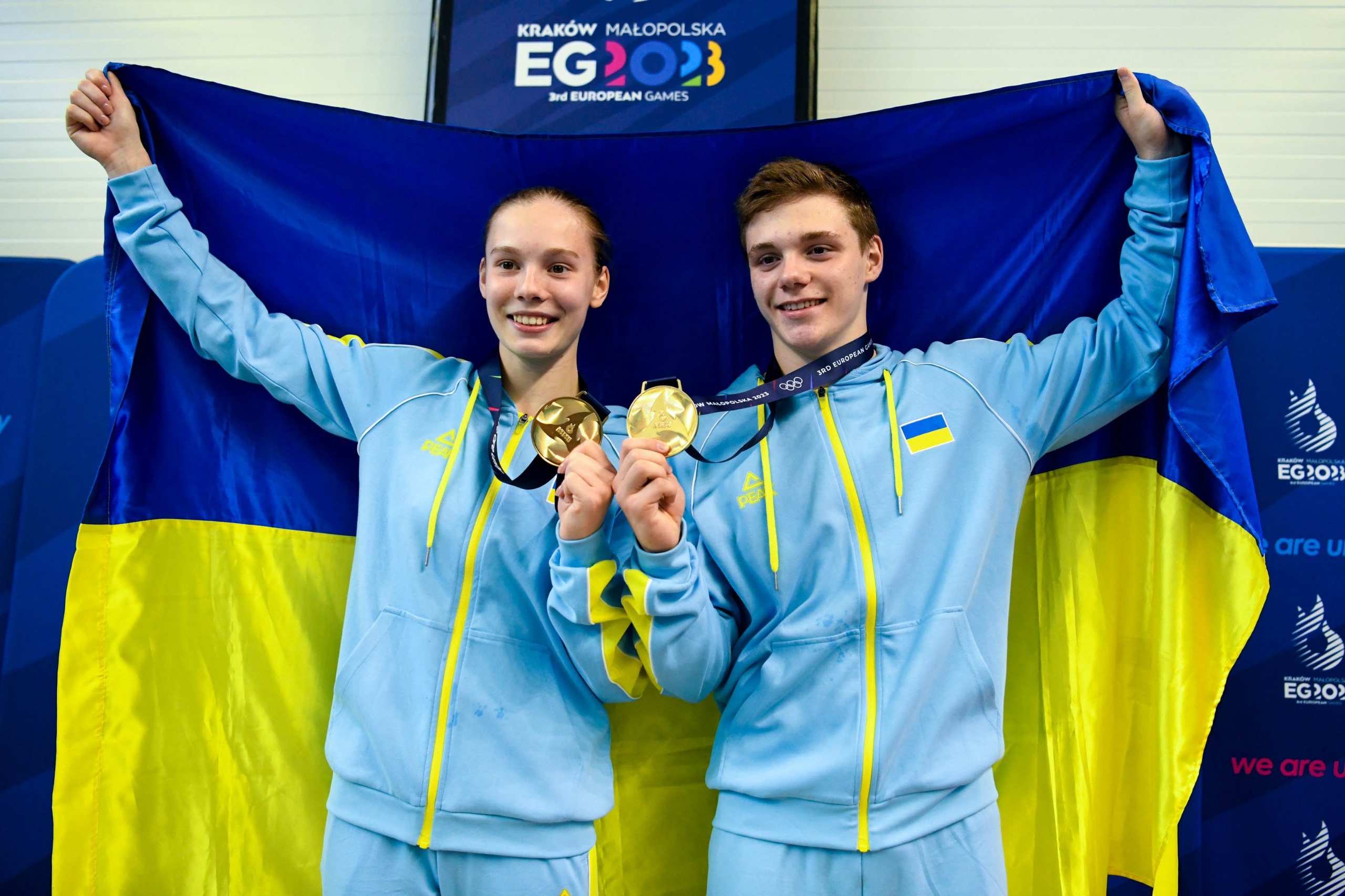
- Kseniya Baylo and Boliukh at the 2023 European Games

Personal information
- Native name: Кірілл Сергійович Болюх
- Full name: Kirill Serhiiovych Boliukh
- Citizenship: Ukrainian
- Born: 12 March 2007 (age 19)

Sport
- Country: Ukraine
- Sport: Diving
Medal record
Men's diving
Representing Ukraine
World Championships
Silver medal – second place	2023 Fukuoka	10 m synchro
Bronze medal – third place	2024 Doha	10 m synchro
European Games
Gold medal – first place	2023 Kraków–Małopolska	10 m synchro
Gold medal – first place	2023 Kraków–Małopolska	10 m mixed synchro
European Championships
Silver medal – second place	2022 Rome	10 m synchro
Silver medal – second place	2022 Rome	Team event
Bronze medal – third place	2026 Paris	Team event
European Diving Championships
Gold medal – first place	2023 Rzeszów	10 m synchro
Gold medal – first place	2023 Rzeszów	10 m mixed synchro
Gold medal – first place	2025 Antalya	Mixed team
Gold medal – first place	2025 Antalya	10 m mixed synchro
World Junior Championships
Gold medal – first place	2022 Montréal	3 m springboard
Gold medal – first place	2022 Montréal	10 m platform
European Junior Championships
Silver medal – second place	2021 Rijeka	10 m platform

Kirill Boliukh (Ukrainian: Кірілл Сергійович Болюх; born 12 March 2007) is a Ukrainian diver. He won two silver medals at the 2022 European Championships.

== Career ==
Boliukh made his Ukrainian national team debut in 2021, at the age of 14, when he competed at the Abu Dhabi Aquatics Festival.

At the World Championships in Budapest, he placed together with Oleksiy Sereda 4th in synchronized dives on 10m platform, more than 20 points behind bronze medallists Rylan Wiens and Nathan Zsombor-Murray from Canada, though the Ukrainians were 2nd in the preliminary round.

Boliukh won his first senior medals at the 2022 European Championships in Rome where he finished 2nd in both synchronized dives on 10m platform (together with Sereda) and team event (together with Baylo, Kesar, and Konovalov).

With Sereda, he finished 5th in the 10m synchro, event at the 2024 Olympics.
