= Diving at the 2026 Asian Games – Men's synchronized 10 metre platform =

Diving competition

Men's synchronized 10 metre platform at the 2026 Asian Games
- Venue: Tokyo Aquatics Centre
- Date: 27 September 2026
- Competitors: 12 from 6 nations

Medalists
gold medal	Yang Hao; Lian Junjie	China
silver medal	Enrique Maccartney Harold; Elvis Priestly Clement	Malaysia
bronze medal	Shin Jung-whi; Kim Yeong-taek	South Korea

The men's synchronized 10 metre platform competition at the 2026 Asian Games took place on 27 September 2026 at Tokyo Aquatics Centre.

== Schedule ==
All times are Japan Standard Time (UTC+09:00)

Date	Time	Event
Sunday, 27 September 2026	13:00	Final

== Results ==
Rank	Team	Dive						Total
Rank	Team	1	2	3	4	5	6	Total
1st place, gold medalist(s)	China (CHN); Yang Hao; Lian Junjie	55.80	54.00	81.60	84.48	89.76	99.90	465.54
2nd place, silver medalist(s)	Malaysia (MAS); Enrique Maccartney Harold; Elvis Priestly Clement	39.60	47.40	71.04	70.08	68.40	81.00	377.52
3rd place, bronze medalist(s)	South Korea (KOR); Shin Jung-whi; Kim Yeong-taek	48.00	46.20	65.28	67.50	70.08	78.84	375.90
4	Japan (JPN); Shuta Yamada; Reo Nishida	48.00	48.00	72.00	64.32	60.48	73.80	366.60
5	Iran (IRI); Sam Vajir; Mohammad Moghaddasi	36.00	39.00	48.96	45.54	51.00	52.20	272.70
6	Uzbekistan (UZB); Abduvakhab Vakhabov; Amal Mavlyanov	33.00	31.20	47.04	46.98	40.50	37.44	236.16
