= Noah Williams (diver) =

English diver (born 2000)

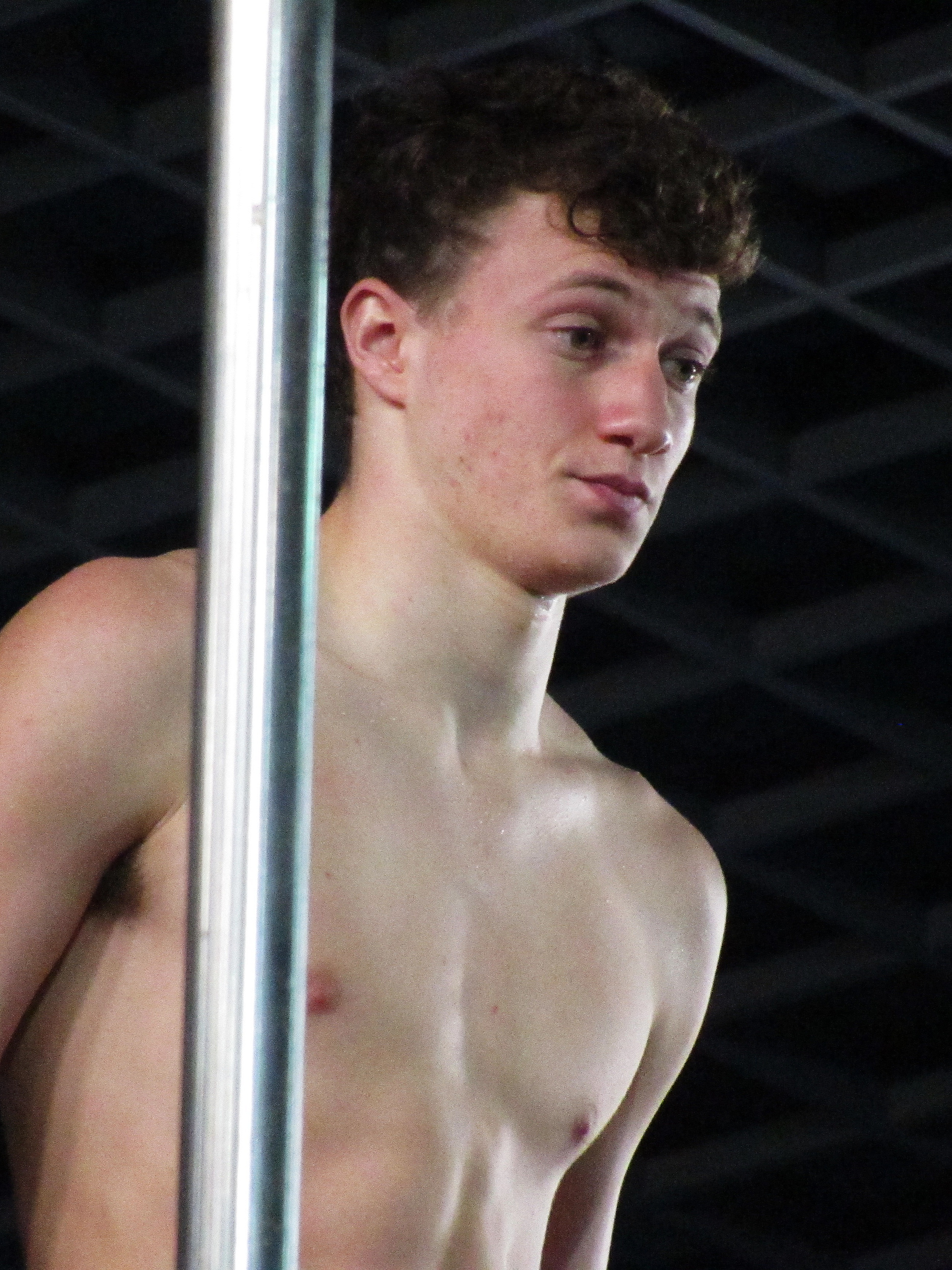
- Williams at the 2019 European Diving Championships in Kyiv

Personal information
- Full name: Noah Oliver Williams
- Born: 15 May 2000 (age 26) London, England

Sport
- Country: United Kingdom
- Sport: Diving
- Event: 10 m
- Club: Dive London Aquatics
- Coached by: Jane Figueiredo; David Jenkins
Medal record
Men's diving
Representing Great Britain
Olympic Games
Silver medal – second place	2024 Paris	10 m synchro
Bronze medal – third place	2024 Paris	10 m platform
World Championships
Silver medal – second place	2022 Budapest	10 m synchro
Silver medal – second place	2024 Doha	10 m synchro
European Championships
Silver medal – second place	2018 Edinburgh	10 m synchro
Silver medal – second place	2020 Budapest	10 m mixed synchro
Silver medal – second place	2022 Rome	10 m individual
Bronze medal – third place	2022 Rome	Team event
European Diving Championships
Silver medal – second place	2019 Kyiv	Mixed 10 m synchro
Bronze medal – third place	2017 Kyiv	10 m synchro
Bronze medal – third place	2019 Kyiv	10 m synchro
Representing England
Commonwealth Games
Gold medal – first place	2022 Birmingham	10 m synchro
Gold medal – first place	2022 Birmingham	10 m mixed synchro
Silver medal – second place	2018 Gold Coast	10 m synchro

Noah Oliver Williams (born 15 May 2000) is a British diver who represents Great Britain and England and specialises in the 10 metre platform and synchro platform events. Williams took the bronze medal in the 10 metre platform at the 2024 Summer Olympics, the third British diver to do so in that event. In the 10 metre synchronised event at the same Games, Williams won silver with partner Tom Daley. In doing so he became the third British diver, after Jack Laugher and Daley, to win two medals at the same Games.

A multiple medalist at both world and European championships level for Great Britain, Williams is also the 2022 Commonwealth Games champion in both his synchronised events (Men's and Mixed) representing England.

== Early life ==
Williams is from Hoxton in Hackney, London. He was about nine when he first tried diving – while at school, he saw a leaflet from Crystal Palace Diving seeking talent and went to try out the sport, and was accepted. He received support from Hackney's Youth Sports Fund and won the Hackney Sports Awards for six years. He now trains at the London Aquatics Centre.

== Career ==
Williams started diving competitively in 2011 in the ASA National Skills competition, and also competed in the National Age Group Diving Championships in 2013. He won his first national title in 2015 in Group B 3 metre Springboard event, and won a bronze in the 3 metre synchro in his European debut.

In 2016, Williams won the British Junior Elite Platform, and won another bronze at the European Junior Championships in the same event. He was also part of the team that won gold in World Junior Championships.

=== 2017 ===
In 2017, Williams partnered with Matthew Dixon in the men's synchronized 10 metre platform in the FINA Grand Prix event in held in Gatineau, Canada, and won a gold medal. He also competed in the 10 metre platform at the European Juniors in Bergen, Norway, and won a silver medal behind his diving partner Matthew Dixon. The duo also won a silver in the 10 metre synchro.

At the 2017 European Diving Championships, Williams and Dixon won their first senior international title, gaining a bronze in the 10 metre platform synchro.

=== 2018–2019 ===
At the 2018 Commonwealth Games held in the Gold Coast, Australia, Williams again partnered with Matthew Dixon in the men's synchronised 10 metre platform. They won the silver medal behind fellow GB divers Tom Daley and Daniel Goodfellow with a score of 399.99 points. He finished just outside the medal positions in fourth in the 10m Platform.

In 2018, at the World Junior Diving Championships in Kyiv, Williams and Dixon won the silver medal in the platform synchro. The duo then won another silver at the 2018 European Championships in Glasgow/Edinburgh in the Men's 10 m synchro platform.

Williams made his World Championship debut at the 2019 World Aquatics Championships held in Gwangju, South Korea, he finished fourth with Robyn Birch in the mixed 10m platform synchro event, and won qualification for the 2020 Olympics GB team. At the 2019 European Diving Championships held in Kyiv, Williams won silver in the Mixed 10 m platform synchro with Eden Cheng, a bronze in Men's 3m synchro with Dixon, as well as in the team event.

=== 2020–2021 ===
In March 2020, Williams won his first individual international title at the first event of the 2020 FINA Diving World Series which was held in Montreal, Canada, winning gold in the Men's 10m Platform.

In May 2021, Williams and Andrea Spendolini-Sirieix won a silver medal in the 10m mixed synchro event at the 2020 European Aquatics Championships.

Williams qualified for the Olympic Games in Tokyo 2021, however, he missed out on the Men's 10 metre platform semifinal after finishing 27th.

=== 2022 ===
In February 2022, Williams won the gold medal in the Men's 10m Platform event at the British National Diving Cup with a score of 448.50.

At the 2022 World Aquatics Championships held in Budapest, Williams partnered with Matty Lee for the first time in an international competition and they won silver in the synchro 10 m platform event.

At the 2022 Commonwealth Games, Williams and Lee won gold in the synchro 10m platform despite Williams injuring his ankle. Williams also won gold with in the mixed synchro 10m platform with Spendolini-Sirieix. Williams also won a silver at the 2022 European Aquatics Championships in the men's 10m platform final.

=== 2024 ===
With partner Tom Daley, Williams won the silver medal in the men's synchronized 10 metre platform at the 2024 Summer Olympics. Later in the Games, Williams won a bronze medal in the individual 10 metre platform.

== Diving achievements ==
To date, Williams has won a total of twenty eight medals across both national and international competitions:

=== Olympic Games ===
Year	Location	Event	Score	Result
2020	Tokyo, Japan	Men's 10 metre platform	309.55	27th
2024	Paris, France	Men's 10 metre platform	497.35	3rd
2024	Paris, France	Men's synchronized 10 metre platform^{[A]}	463.44	2nd

=== World Championships ===
Year	Location	Event	Score	Result
2019	Gwangju, South Korea	Men's 10 metre platform	440.95	10th
2019	Gwangju, South Korea	Mixed synchronized 10 metre platform^{[B]}	285.18	4th
2022	Budapest, Hungary	Men's 10 metre platform	479.05	5th
2022	Budapest, Hungary	Men's synchronized 10 metre platform^{[C]}	427.71	2nd
2023	Fukuoka, Japan	Men's 10 metre platform	499.10	4th
2024	Doha, Qatar	Men's 10 metre platform	479.05	7th
2024	Doha, Qatar	Men's synchronized 10 metre platform^{[A]}	422.37	2nd

=== World Cup ===
Year	Location	Event	Score	Result
2018	Wuhan, China	Men's Synchronised 10m Platform^{[D]}	384.81	6th
2018	Wuhan, China	Mixed Synchronised 10m Platform^{[B]}	267.72	8th
2023	Berlin, Germany	Men's 10m Platform	468.05	3rd
2024	Xi'an, China	Men's 10m Platform	476.10	5th
2024	Xi'an, China	Synchronized 10m Platform^{[A]}	440.37	2nd

=== European Championships ===
Year	Location	Event	Score	Result
2017	Kyiv, Ukraine	Men's synchronized 10 metre platform^{[D]}	388.05	3rd
2018	Edinburgh, Scotland	Men's 10 m synchro platform^{[D]}	399.90	2nd
2019	Kyiv, Ukraine	Mixed 10 m platform synchro^{[E]}	303.60	2nd
2019	Kyiv, Ukraine	Team event^{[F]}	392.00	3rd
2019	Kyiv, Ukraine	Men's synchronized 10 metre platform^{[D]}	412.56	3rd
2019	Kyiv, Ukraine	Men's 10 metre platform	423.90	4th
2020	Budapest, Hungary	Team^{[G]}	383.40	4th
2020	Budapest, Hungary	Men's 10 m platform	480.65	5th
2020	Budapest, Hungary	Mixed 10 m platform synchro^{[H]}	307.32	2nd
2022	Rome, Italy	Men's 10 m platform	459.00	2nd
2022	Rome, Italy	Team^{[I]}	384.70	3rd

=== Commonwealth Games ===
Year	Location	Event	Score	Result
2018	Gold Coast, Australia	Men's 10 metre platform	405.85	4th
2018	Gold Coast, Australia	Men's synchronised 10 metre platform^{[D]}	399.99	2nd
2022	Birmingham, England	Men's 10 metre platform	408.90	7th
2022	Birmingham, England	Mixed synchronised 10 metre platform^{[H]}	333.06	1st
2022	Birmingham, England	Men's synchronised 10 metre platform^{[C]}	429.78	1st

=== Diving World Series ===
Year	Location	Event	Score	Result
2019	London, England	Mixed 10m synchronised^{[J]}	311.76	4th
2020	Montreal, Canada	Men's 10m synchronised^{[C]}	374.79	5th
2020	Montreal, Canada	Men's 10m platform	493.35	1st

=== Diving Grand Prix ===
Year	Location	Event	Score	Result
2017	Gold Coast, Australia	Men's 10m platform	364.85	5th
2017	Gold Coast, Australia	Men's 10m platform^{[D]}	406.32	2nd
2018	Calgary, Canada	Men's 10m Platform	337.35	12th
2018	Calgary, Canada	Men's 10m synchronised^{[D]}	397.98	2nd
2019	Calgary, Canada	Men's 10m platform	340.95	15th
2019	California, USA	Men's 10m platform	392.75	4th
2019	Madrid, Spain	Men's 10m platform	398.80	2nd

Notes
A. with Tom Daley
B. with Robyn Birch
C. with Matty Lee
D. with Matthew Dixon
E. with Eden Cheng
F. with Eden Cheng, Anthony Harding, and Katherine Torrance
G. with Eden Cheng, Yasmin Harper, and Ross Haslam
H. with Andrea Spendolini-Sirieix
I. with Andrea Spendolini-Sirieix, Grace Reid, and James Heatly
J. with Lois Toulson
