= 2019 European Diving Championships =

Water sport competitions

- Host city: Kyiv
- Country: Ukraine
- Nations: 23
- Athletes: 126
- Events: 13
- Dates: 5–11 August 2019
- Main venue: Liko Sports Centre
- Website: http://www2.len.eu/?p=14872

The 2019 European Diving Championships were held in Kyiv, Ukraine from 5 to 11 August 2019. This was the sixth edition of the stand-alone Championships, and the 40th European Championships in diving in total, including the diving portion of the European Aquatics Championships.

The event is a qualification event for the 2020 Summer Olympics with quota places awarded to the nation of the winners of both men's and women's 3 metre and 10 metre events.

== Schedule ==
All times are local (UTC+03:00).

Date	Time	Event	Type
5 August	16:30	Opening ceremony	
5 August	17:00	Team event	Final
6 August	10:00	10m platform women	Qualification
6 August	16:30	3m springboard synchro mixed	Final
6 August	18:00	10m platform women	Final
7 August	10:00	1m springboard men	Qualification
7 August	16:30	10m platform synchro women	Final
7 August	18:00	1m springboard men	Final
8 August	10:00	3m springboard women	Qualification
8 August	16:30	10m platform synchro men	Final
8 August	18:00	3m springboard women	Final
9 August	10:00	3m springboard men	Qualification
9 August	16:30	10m platform synchro mixed	Final
9 August	18:00	3m springboard men	Final
10 August	10:00	1m springboard women	Qualification
10 August	16:30	3m springboard synchro men	Final
10 August	18:00	1m springboard women	Final
11 August	10:00	10m platform men	Qualification
11 August	16:30	3m springboard synchro women	Final
11 August	18:00	10m platform men	Final

== Participating nations ==
A total of 126 athletes (72 men and 54 women) from 23 LEN federations participated at the championships.

- Armenia (4: 4 men, 0 women)
- Austria (3: 3 m, 0 w)
- Belarus (5: 4 m, 1 w)
- Bulgaria (2: 2 m, 0 w)
- Croatia (3: 2 m, 1 w)
- Denmark (1: 1 m, 0 w)
- Finland (5: 2 m, 3 w)
- France (5: 3 m, 2 w)
- Georgia (2: 2 m, 0 w)
- Germany (14: 9 m, 5 w)
- Great Britain (13: 6 m, 7 w)
- Ireland (4: 1 m, 3 w)
- Italy (11: 6 m, 5 w)
- Netherlands (5: 3 m, 2 w)
- Norway (3: 1 m, 2 w)
- Poland (4: 2 m, 2 w)
- Romania (4: 2 m, 2 w)
- Russia (12: 7 m, 5 w)
- Spain (4: 3 m, 1 w)
- Sweden (4: 1 m, 3 w)
- Switzerland (6: 3 m, 3 w)
- Turkey (1: 1 m, 0 w)
- Ukraine (11: 5 m, 6 w)

== Medal table ==
* Host nation (Ukraine)

Rank	Nation	Gold	Silver	Bronze	Total
1	Russia (RUS)	6	2	4	12
2	Ukraine (UKR)*	3	3	1	7
3	Germany (GER)	2	4	2	8
4	Netherlands (NED)	1	1	0	2
5	Italy (ITA)	1	0	1	2
6	Great Britain (GBR)	0	2	4	6
7	France (FRA)	0	1	0	1
8	Switzerland (SUI)	0	0	1	1
Totals (8 entries)		13	13	13	39

== Medal summary ==
=== Men ===
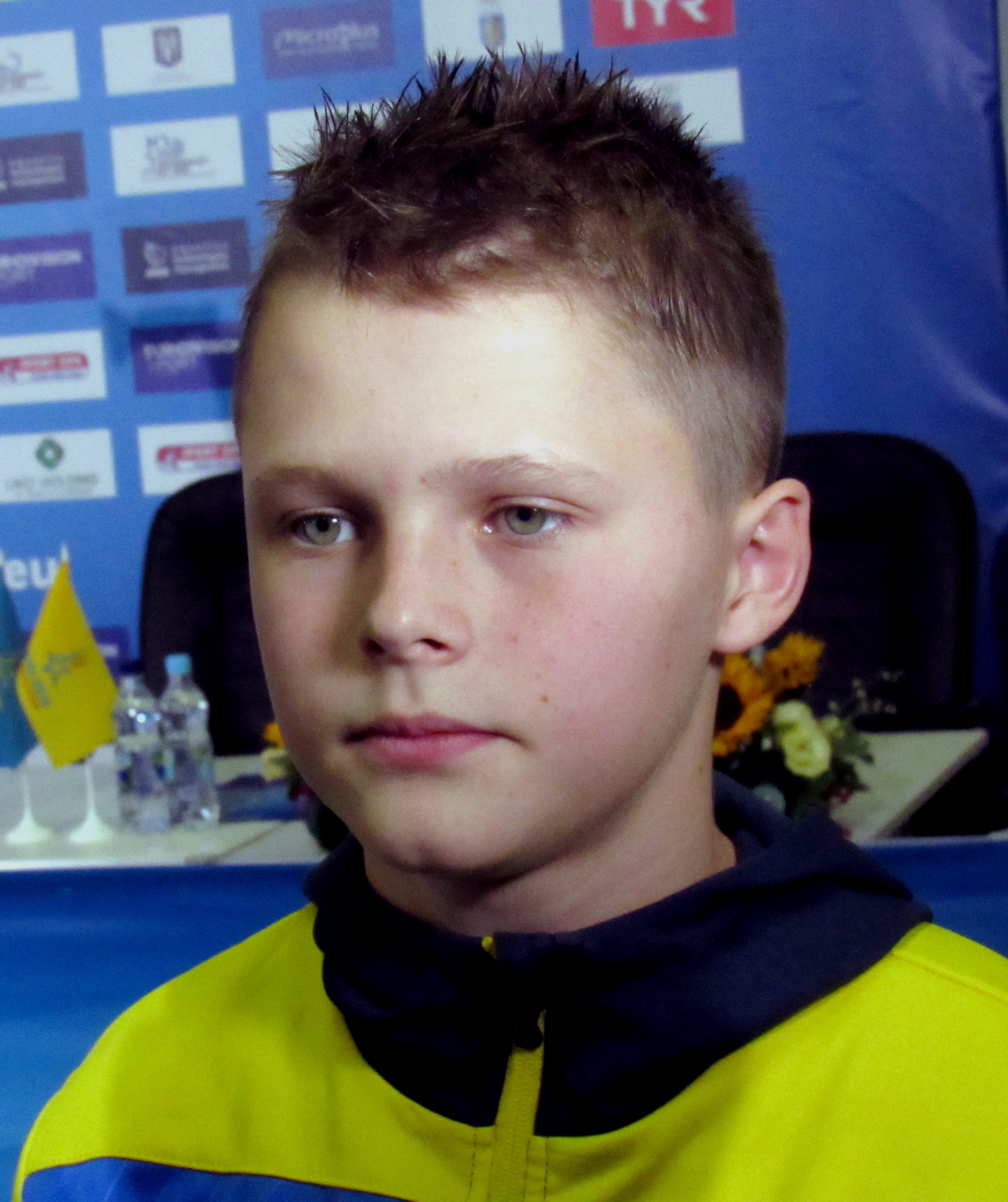
13 years old Ukrainian Oleksiy Sereda became the youngest ever Europe champion

Event	Gold		Silver		Bronze	
1 m springboard	Patrick Hausding; Germany	388.85	Oleh Kolodiy; Ukraine	381.50	Lorenzo Marsaglia; Italy	380.15
3 m springboard	Evgeny Kuznetsov; Russia	499.45	Patrick Hausding; Germany	456.85	James Heatly; Great Britain	439.90
10 m platform	Oleksiy Sereda; Ukraine	488.85	Benjamin Auffret; France	474.90	Ruslan Ternovoi; Russia	445.25
3 m synchro springboard	Russia; Evgeny Kuznetsov; Nikita Shleikher	435.69	Germany; Patrick Hausding; Lars Rüdiger	398.64	Great Britain; Anthony Harding; Jordan Houlden	387.60
10 m synchro platform	Russia; Aleksandr Belevtsev; Nikita Shleikher	417.30	Ukraine; Oleh Serbin; Oleksiy Sereda	413.16	Great Britain; Matthew Dixon; Noah Williams	412.56

=== Women ===
Event	Gold		Silver		Bronze	
1 m springboard	Vitaliia Koroleva; Russia	266.70	Olena Fedorova; Ukraine	263.45	Kristina Ilinykh; Russia	263.05
3 m springboard	Inge Jansen; Netherlands	293.85	Kristina Ilinykh; Russia	292.60	Tina Punzel; Germany	290.15
10 m platform	Sofiya Lyskun; Ukraine	330.00	Celine van Duijn; Netherlands	304.50	Yulia Timoshinina; Russia	304.45
3 m synchro springboard	Russia; Vitaliia Koroleva; Uliana Kliueva	290.70	Germany; Lena Hentschel; Tina Punzel	288.87	Ukraine; Viktoriya Kesar; Anna Pysmenska	287.37
10 m synchro platform	Italy; Noemi Batki; Chiara Pellacani	290.34	Great Britain; Phoebe Banks; Emily Martin	284.40	Russia; Ekaterina Beliaeva; Yulia Timoshinina	277.50

=== Mixed ===
Event	Gold		Silver		Bronze	
Mixed 3 m springboard synchro	Ukraine; Stanislav Oliferchyk; Viktoriya Kesar	297.69	Germany; Lou Massenberg; Tina Punzel	294.09	Switzerland; Jonathan Suckow; Michelle Heimberg	282.00
Mixed 10 m platform synchro	Russia; Viktor Minibaev; Ekaterina Beliaeva	320.70	Great Britain; Noah Williams; Eden Cheng	303.60	Germany; Florian Fandler; Christina Wassen	287.76
Team event	Germany; Patrick Hausding; Christina Wassen; Tina Punzel; Lou Massenberg	405.50	Russia; Ekaterina Beliaeva; Vitaliia Koroleva; Viktor Minibaev; Ilia Molchanov	401.05	Great Britain; Eden Cheng; Anthony Harding; Noah Williams; Katherine Torrance	392.00

== Championships Trophy ==
The trophy is assigned to the nation with most points gained by the top 12 athletes or teams in each event. Russia won the title with 258 points, while the previous Trophy's winner and host Ukraine finished at fourth place.

Rank	Country	Total	M	W	Mx
1st place, gold medalist(s)	Russia	258	100	94	64
2	Germany	215	71	76	68
3	Great Britain	189	76	57	56
4	Ukraine	179	80	57	42
5	Italy	155	54	53	48
6	Switzerland	76	23	33	20
7	Netherlands	58	-	44	14
8	France	56	32	6	18
9	Romania	40	8	16	16
10	Norway	26	-	26	-
11	Sweden	22	5	7	10
11	Armenia	22	22	-	-
13	Belarus	21	6	3	12
14	Poland	20	20	-	-
15	Ireland	18	4	4	10
16	Georgia	8	8	-	-
17	Spain	5	-	5	-
