= Diving at the 2022 European Aquatics Championships – Men's 10 m synchro platform =

Men's 10 m synchro platform at the 2022 European Aquatics Championships
- Venue: Foro Italico
- Dates: 19 August
- Competitors: 12 from 6 nations
- Winning points: 390.48

Medalists
gold medal	Ben Cutmore; Kyle Kothari	Great Britain
silver medal	Kirill Boliukh; Oleksiy Sereda	Ukraine
bronze medal	Timo Barthel; Jaden Eikermann	Germany

The Men's 10 m synchro platform competition of the 2022 European Aquatics Championships was held on 19 August 2022.

== Results ==
The final was started at 15:30.

Rank	Nation	Divers	Points						
Rank	Nation	Divers	T1	T2	T3	T4	T5	T6	Total
1st place, gold medalist(s)	Great Britain	Ben Cutmore; Kyle Kothari	45.60	49.80	72.00	75.24	71.04	76.80	390.48
2nd place, silver medalist(s)	Ukraine	Kirill Boliukh; Oleksiy Sereda	47.40	51.00	79.68	72.00	69.12	68.82	388.02
3rd place, bronze medalist(s)	Germany	Timo Barthel; Jaden Eikermann	47.40	48.00	70.08	67.32	68.34	68.16	369.30
4	Italy	Andreas Larsen; Eduard Timbretti Gugiu	49.80	47.40	59.40	69.30	64.35	72.00	362.25
5	Greece	Nikolaos Molvalis; Athanasios Tsirikos	47.40	46.20	55.80	51.33	69.12	68.16	338.01
6	Austria	Anton Knoll; Dariush Lotfi	42.60	42.00	62.40	64.80	44.55	57.60	313.95
