= 2019 European Diving Championships – Men's synchronized 10 metre platform =

Men's synchronized 10 metre platform event at the 2019 European Diving Championships was contested on 8 August.

== Results ==
Six pairs of athletes participated at the single-round event.

Rank	Divers	Nationality	D1	D2	D3	D4	D5	D6	Total
1st place, gold medalist(s)	Aleksandr Belevtsev; Nikita Shleikher	Russia	52.20	51.60	82.62	84.48	63.24	83.16	417.30
2nd place, silver medalist(s)	Oleh Serbin; Oleksii Sereda	Ukraine	51.00	49.20	76.68	73.26	76.50	86.40	413.16
3rd place, bronze medalist(s)	Matthew Dixon; Noah Williams	Great Britain	49.80	51.00	70.08	79.56	77.76	84.36	412.56
4	Vladimir Harutyunyan; Lev Sargsyan	Armenia	45.60	43.80	69.12	61.44	51.84	81.00	352.80
5	Karl Schöne; Tom Waldsteiner	Germany	40.80	36.00	60.30	66.24	67.20	73.44	343.98
6	Julian Verzotto; Maicol Verzotto	Italy	49.20	51.00	57.42	59.40	59.52	66.24	342.78
