= Diving at the 2022 European Aquatics Championships – Women's 10 m synchro platform =

Women's 10 m synchro platform at the 2022 European Aquatics Championships
- Venue: Foro Italico
- Dates: 20 August
- Competitors: 8 from 4 nations
- Teams: 4
- Winning points: 303.60

Medalists
gold medal	Andrea Spendolini-Sirieix; Lois Toulson	Great Britain
silver medal	Kseniya Baylo; Sofiya Lyskun	Ukraine
bronze medal	Christina Wassen; Elena Wassen	Germany

The Women's 10 m synchro springboard competition of the 2022 European Aquatics Championships was held on 20 August 2022.

== Results ==
The final was started at 15:30.

Rank	Nation	Divers	Points					
Rank	Nation	Divers	T1	T2	T3	T4	T5	Total
1st place, gold medalist(s)	Great Britain	Andrea Spendolini-Sirieix; Lois Toulson	46.80	49.20	68.40	66.24	72.96	303.60
2nd place, silver medalist(s)	Ukraine	Kseniya Baylo; Sofiya Lyskun	49.80	46.20	58.80	72.96	71.10	298.86
3rd place, bronze medalist(s)	Germany	Christina Wassen; Elena Wassen	49.80	47.40	62.40	62.10	68.16	289.86
4	Italy	Elettra Neroni; Maia Biginelli	44.40	45.60	63.84	52.20	61.44	267.48
