= Diving at the 2022 Commonwealth Games – Men's synchronised 10 metre platform =

Men's synchronised 10 metre platform at the 2022 Commonwealth Games
- Venue: Sandwell Aquatics Centre
- Date: 5 August
- Competitors: 12 from 5 nations
- Winning score: 429.78

Medalists
gold medal	Noah Williams; Matty Lee	England
silver medal	Rylan Wiens; Nathan Zsombor-Murray	Canada
bronze medal	Cassiel Rousseau; Domonic Bedggood	Australia

The men's synchronised 10 metre platform is part of the 2022 Commonwealth Games diving program. The competition will be held on 5 August 2022 at Sandwell Aquatics Centre in Birmingham, England.

Neither reigning champion returns to the event. Tom Daley chose to miss the Games, while partner Daniel Goodfellow has switched to the men's 3 metre springboard synchronised event. Olympic champion Matty Lee is listed to take part with new partner Noah Williams. Nations can send more than one team to a synchronised event and hosts England have entered two teams in this event.

== Schedule ==
All times are BST (UTC+1)

Date	Time	Round
5 August 2022	19:00	Finals

== Format ==
A single round will be held, with each team making six dives. Eleven judges score each dive: three for each diver, and five for synchronisation. Only the middle score counts for each diver, with the middle three counting for synchronisation. These five scores are averaged, multiplied by 3, and multiplied by the dive's degree of difficulty to give a total dive score. The scores for each of the six dives are then aggregated to give a final score.

== Results ==
The initial field for the event was published on 22 July 2022:

Rank	Nation	Dives						Total
Rank	Nation	1	2	3	4	5	6	Total
1st place, gold medalist(s)	England; Noah Williams; Matty Lee	52.20	50.40	84.24	73.92	84.66	84.36	429.78
2nd place, silver medalist(s)	Canada; Rylan Wiens; Nathan Zsombor-Murray	49.20	49.80	81.60	81.03	74.46	77.76	413.85
3rd place, bronze medalist(s)	Australia; Cassiel Rousseau; Domonic Bedggood	47.40	46.20	76.80	76.80	84.36	81.00	412.56
4	England; Ben Cutmore; Kyle Kothari	51.60	49.80	64.80	80.19	74.88	70.08	391.35
5	Malaysia; Jellson Jabillin; Hanis Jaya Surya	50.40	50.40	61.32	57.60	73.92	72.00	365.64
6	New Zealand; Luke Sipkes; Arno Lee	49.80	43.80	62.16	58.56	50.49	63.90	328.71
