= 2019 European Diving Championships – Mixed 10 m platform synchro =

Mixed 10 m platform synchro event at the 2019 European Diving Championships was contested on 9 August.

== Results ==
Five pairs of athletes participated at the single-round event.

| Rank | Divers | Nationality | D1 | D2 | D3 | D4 | D5 | Total |
|---|---|---|---|---|---|---|---|---|
| 1st place, gold medalist(s) | Ekaterina Beliaeva; Viktor Minibaev | Russia | 52.20 | 50.40 | 69.30 | 74.88 | 73.92 | 320.70 |
| 2nd place, silver medalist(s) | Eden Cheng; Noah Williams | Great Britain | 48.60 | 47.40 | 68.40 | 68.16 | 71.04 | 303.60 |
| 3rd place, bronze medalist(s) | Christina Wassen; Florian Fandler | Germany | 46.80 | 50.40 | 61.44 | 64.80 | 64.32 | 287.76 |
| 4 | Noemi Batki; Maicol Verzotto | Italy | 47.40 | 47.40 | 63.00 | 62.40 | 66.24 | 286.44 |
| 5 | Antonia Mihaela Pavel; Constantin Popovici | Romania | 40.80 | 39.00 | 67.20 | 71.04 | 51.30 | 269.34 |
