= Andrea Spendolini-Sirieix =

British diver (born 2004)

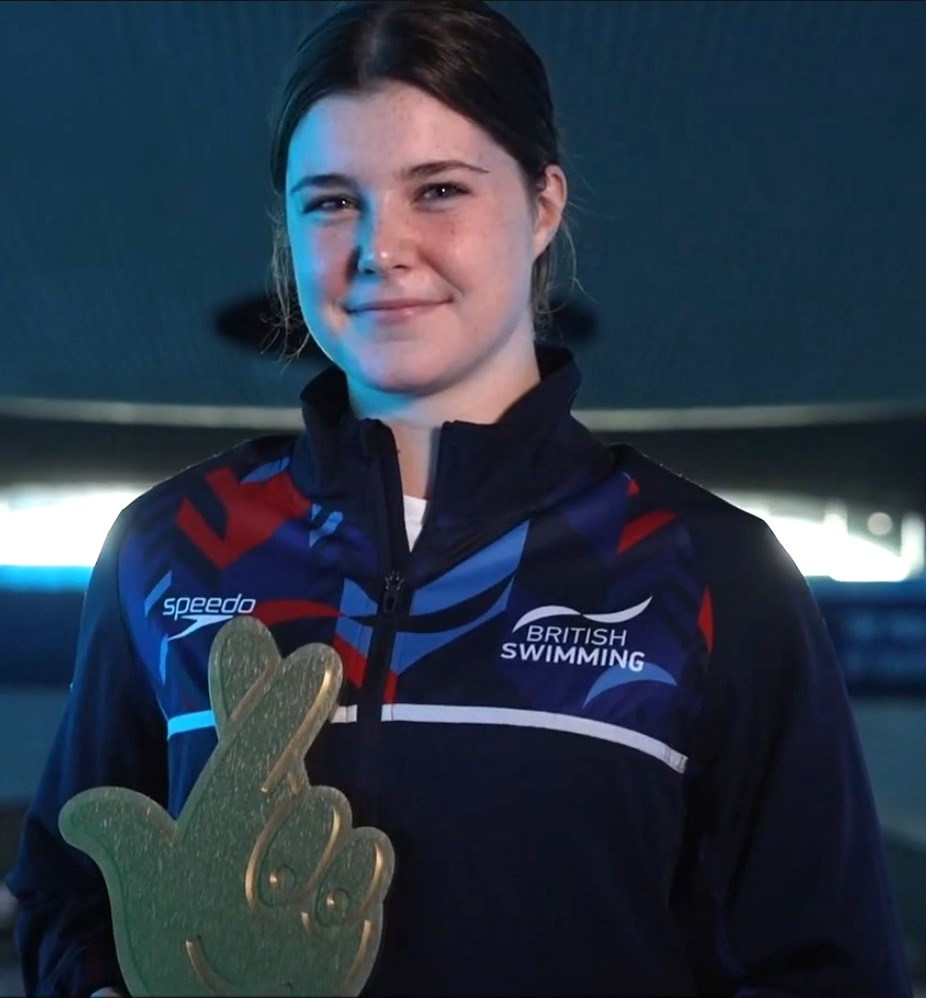
- Spendolini-Sirieix in October 2022 being presented with the 2022 National Lottery Athlete of the Year

Personal information
- Nationality: British; French
- Born: 11 September 2004 (age 22) London, England
- Home town: London
- Years active: 2018-present
- Relative: Fred Sirieix (father)

Sport
- Country: Great Britain
- Sport: Diving
- Event: 10 m
- Coached by: Alex Rochas
Medal record
Women's diving
Representing Great Britain
Olympic Games
Bronze medal – third place	2024 Paris	10 m synchro
World Championships
Gold medal – first place	2024 Doha	Team event
Silver medal – second place	2023 Fukuoka	10 m synchro
Bronze medal – third place	2022 Budapest	Team event
Bronze medal – third place	2024 Doha	10 m platform
Bronze medal – third place	2024 Doha	10 m synchro
European Championships
Gold medal – first place	2022 Rome	10 m platform
Gold medal – first place	2022 Rome	10 m synchro
Silver medal – second place	2020 Budapest	10 m mixed synchro
Bronze medal – third place	2020 Budapest	10 m platform
Bronze medal – third place	2022 Rome	Team event
World Junior Championships
Gold medal – first place	2022 Montreal	10 m platform
Bronze medal – third place	2022 Montreal	Team event
Representing England
Commonwealth Games
Gold medal – first place	2022 Birmingham	10 m platform
Gold medal – first place	2022 Birmingham	10 m mixed synchro
Silver medal – second place	2022 Birmingham	10 m synchro

Andrea Spendolini-Sirieix (/ænˈdreɪə spɛndəˈliːnɪ sɪrɪ.ɛks/; born 11 September 2004) is a British-French professional diver who represents Great Britain and England internationally.

In her breakthrough year of 2022, she became a World junior, two-time European senior, two-time Commonwealth Games and two-time national senior champion across 10 metre platform and 10 metre synchronised platform events, as well as a World senior medallist in the team event.

In 2024, she won the gold medal in the team event of the 2024 World Aquatics Championships. Days later, she won a bronze medal in the 10 metre platform. A third medal, another bronze, followed in the 10 metre synchronised platform event.

At the 2024 Summer Olympics she won a bronze medal with Lois Toulson in the 10 metre synchronised event.

== Early life ==
Spendolini-Sirieix was born in London on 11 September 2004, the daughter of French hotel host Fred Sirieix and his ex-partner Alex Spendolini, who is Italian. Spendolini-Sirieix was talent scouted by Crystal Palace diving club when she was at John Stainer Community Primary School in Brockley, then completed her secondary and sixth form education at Harris Academy Bermondsey.

== Career ==
At the British Diving Championships in 2018, Spendolini-Sirieix and her colleague from Crystal Palace Diving Club, Josie Zillig, won the women's 10m synchronised diving event, completing five dives as the only entrants. The following year, partnering Emily Martin, she won Women's synchronised diving competition at the Junior European Championships in Kazan.

She made her international debut in 2018 as a thirteen year old, and won her first solo international gold medal at the 2020 FINA Diving Grand Prix. Later that year Spendolini-Sirieix was recognised as the BBC Young Sports Personality of the Year. She won the gold for the women's individual 10 metre platform at her first Commonwealth Games, in 2022, the first English woman to win the event since 1966. Two weeks later, she became European Champion in the same event, representing Great Britain. Sirieix went on to win a further gold at each event in the synchronised discipline; in the women's event at the European Championships with Lois Toulson, and at the 10 metre mixed synchro event at the 2022 Commonwealth Games with Noah Williams.

Spendolini-Sirieix won a solo gold at the British Diving Championships in the Women's 10m Platform competition in 2020, and a few weeks later won her first international gold medal at the FINA Grand Prix in Rostock in February 2020. Having been in second place during the first four rounds in Rostock, she achieved a score of 76.80 on her final dive to win with a total of 330.50, ahead of Celina Toth who scored a total of 329.35.

Spendolini-Sirieix earned her place as the youngest member of the Team GB diving team at the Tokyo 2020 Olympics after some successful performances over the previous two years, including two medals at the 2021 European Championships. In Tokyo, aged only 16, Andrea went through the rounds and reached the Olympic final in the Women's 10m Platform, ultimately finishing seventh.

She was selected as the BBC Young Sports Personality of the Year in 2020, and was shortlisted again in 2022.

In May 2021, Spendolini-Sirieix and Noah Williams won a silver medal in the 10m mixed synchro event at the 2020 European Aquatics Championships. She also won a bronze in individual 10m platform at the Championships.

In August 2022, she won two gold medals, in the Women's 10m platform and the Mixed Pairs Synchronised 10m platform with Noah Williams, and a silver medal, in the Women's Synchronised 10m platform with Eden Cheng, at the Commonwealth Games in Birmingham.

In May 2023, she won her second 10m platform title at the British Diving Championships.

In July 2023 Lois Toulson and Andrea Spendolini-Sirieix won silver at 2023 World Aquatics Championships in the Women's 10m synchro.

A year later, they won bronze in the Women's 10m Synchro at the 2024 Paris Olympics. Spendolini-Sirieix came 6th in the individual 10 metre platform at the Games.

Spendolini-Sirieix was named the 2024 European Aquatics’ Female Diver of the Year and the 2024 Sunday Times Young Sportswoman award.

== Personal life ==
Spendolini-Sirieix is the daughter of French-born maitre d'hotel and television personality Fred Sirieix, who rose to fame in the United Kingdom through the First Dates television series. Her mother, Alex Spendolini, is of Italian heritage. Her father was employed as a roving reporter during the 2024 Summer Olympics for the BBC as a French and Paris native familiar to British television viewers, and interviewed his daughter when she won her bronze medal.

Spendolini-Sirieix is a Christian. After winning bronze at the 2024 Olympics, she gave an interview in which she spoke about giving glory to God.

== Career highlights ==
Competition	Event	2018	2019	2020	2021	2022	2023	2024	Ref.
International, representing Great Britain
Olympic Games	Women's 10m Platform				7th			6th	
Olympic Games	Women's 10m Synchro							3rd place, bronze medalist(s)	
World Aquatics Championships	Women's 10m Platform					19th		3rd place, bronze medalist(s)	
World Aquatics Championships	Women's 10m Synchro						(silver) ^{[D]}	3rd place, bronze medalist(s)	
World Aquatics Championships	Team					3rd place, bronze medalist(s)		1st place, gold medalist(s)	
European Aquatics Championships	Women's 10m Platform				3rd place, bronze medalist(s)	1st place, gold medalist(s)			
European Aquatics Championships	Women's 10m Synchro					1st place, gold medalist(s)			
European Aquatics Championships	10m Mixed Synchro				(silver) ^{[C]}	2nd place, silver medalist(s)			
FINA Diving World Cup	Women's 10m Platform				4th				
FINA Diving Grand Prix (Rostock)	Women's 10m Platform			1st place, gold medalist(s)					
International junior, representing Great Britain
Junior World Championships	Women's 10m Platform					1st place, gold medalist(s)			
Junior World Championships	Team					3rd place, bronze medalist(s)			
Junior European Championships	Women's 10m Synchro		(gold) ^{[B]}						
International, representing England
Commonwealth Games	Women's 10m Platform					1st place, gold medalist(s)			
Commonwealth Games	Women's 10m Synchro					2nd place, silver medalist(s)			
Commonwealth Games	10m Mixed Synchro					1st place, gold medalist(s)			
Domestic
British Diving Championships	Women's 10m Platform	4th	5th	1st place, gold medalist(s)		2nd place, silver medalist(s)			^{[5]}
British Diving Championships	Women's 10m Synchro	(gold) ^{[A]}	3rd place, bronze medalist(s)	2nd place, silver medalist(s)		3rd place, bronze medalist(s)			
British National Diving Cup	Women's 10m Platform					2nd place, silver medalist(s)			

A. with Josie Zilling (there were no other entrants)
B. with Emily Martin
C. with Noah Williams
D. with Lois Toulson
