= Eden Cheng =

British diver (born 2002)

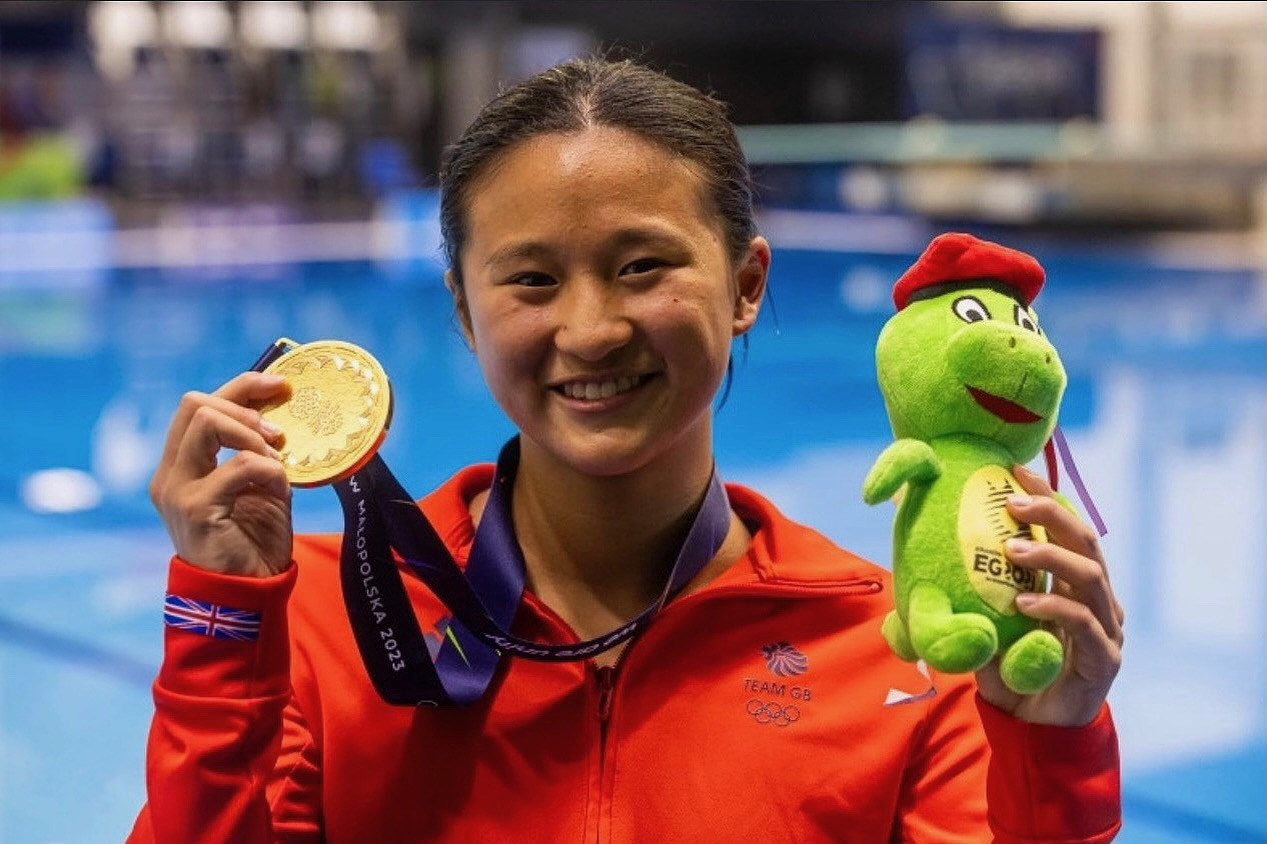
- Cheng at the 2023 European Games

Personal information
- Born: 2 December 2002 (age 23) London, England

Sport
- Country: Great Britain
- Sport: Diving
- College team: UCLA Diving Team
- Coached by: Chen Lin
Medal record
Women's diving
Representing Great Britain
European Games
Gold medal – first place	2023 Kraków-Małopolska	10 m platform
European Championships
Gold medal – first place	2018 Glasgow	10 m synchro
Silver medal – second place	2020 Budapest	10 m synchro
European Diving Championships
Gold medal – first place	2023 Rzeszów	10 m platform
Silver medal – second place	2019 Kyiv	10 m mixed synchro
FINA Diving World Cup
Silver medal – second place	2021 Tokyo	10 m synchro
Representing England
Commonwealth Games
Silver medal – second place	2022 Birmingham	10 m synchro

Eden Cheng (born 2 December 2002) is an English elite diver representing Great Britain and England. She won her first major medal in 2018 at the age of 15, when she won the gold medal at the European Championships in the 10 metre platform synchro with Lois Toulson.

== Early life ==
Cheng was born in London in 2002 to Chinese immigrants. She studied at Alleyn's School in Dulwich, London. She previously went to Streatham and Clapham Junior School. She took up diving after being inspired during the 2012 London Olympics. She joined Crystal Palace Diving where she trains under Chen Lin.

In 2022, Cheng moved to California and dives with the UCLA women's diving team.

== Career ==
Cheng began competing as a junior in 2013 and became a multiple-time national champion. In 2016, she participated in the National Age Group Championships and won the 3m springboard event.

In 2017, she competed at her first British Junior Elite Championships and won gold. The same year Cheng made her debut in a European championship, representing Great Britain at the Junior European Diving Championships in Bergen, where she won a gold medal. She started competing as a senior in a number of FINA Grand Prix events in 2017, one of the youngest divers chosen for these events. She won a silver in the Mixed 10m platform event with Kyle Kothari, as well as a bronze in the 10m Synchro event with Emily Martin in Singapore.

=== 2018–2019 ===
In her first senior competition at the 2018 European Championships in Glasgow/Edinburgh, she partnered with Lois Toulson in the women's 10 metre synchro platform, and at the age of 15 she won her first senior international gold medal.

Cheng took part in her first World Championship at the 2019 World Aquatics Championships held in Gwangju, South Korea. Cheng finished in sixth in the 10 metre synchro with Toulson, as well as the team event with Ross Haslam. At the 2019 European Diving Championships held in Kyiv, Cheng won silver in the Mixed 10 m platform synchro with Noah Williams and bronze in the team event.

=== 2021–2022 ===
At the 2021 FINA Diving World Cup held in Japan as an official test event for the 2020 Tokyo Olympics, Cheng and Toulson won silver in synchronised 10m platform, thereby securing their qualification to the Olympics. The pair also won silver in synchronised 10m platform at the European Championships. At the 2020 Olympics held in 2021, the pair finished seventh in the synchronized 10 metre platform after a poor start.

At the 2022 Commonwealth Games, Cheng partnered with Andrea Spendolini-Sirieix on the women's 10m synchro, and they won a silver.

== Career highlights ==
Competition	Event	2018	2019	2020	2021	2022	Ref.
International, representing Great Britain
Olympic Games	Women's 10m Synchro				7th		
World Aquatics Championships	Women's 10m Platform					26th	
World Aquatics Championships	Women's 10m Synchro		6th				
World Aquatics Championships	Team		6th				
European Aquatics Championships	Women's 10m Platform		9th				
European Aquatics Championships	Women's 10m Synchro	1st place, gold medalist(s)					
European Aquatics Championships	10m Mixed Synchro		2nd place, silver medalist(s)				
European Aquatics Championships	Team		3rd place, bronze medalist(s)				
FINA Diving World Cup	10m Synchro	7th			2nd place, silver medalist(s)		
International, representing England
Commonwealth Games	Women's 10m Platform						
Commonwealth Games	Women's 10m Synchro					2nd place, silver medalist(s)	
Commonwealth Games	10m Mixed Synchro						
Domestic
British Diving Championships	Women's 10m Platform		3rd place, bronze medalist(s)	9th		1st place, gold medalist(s)	
British Diving Championships	Women's 10m Synchro		2nd place, silver medalist(s)	1st place, gold medalist(s)		3rd place, bronze medalist(s)	
British National Diving Cup	Women's 10m Platform						
