= Oleh Serbin =

Ukrainian diver

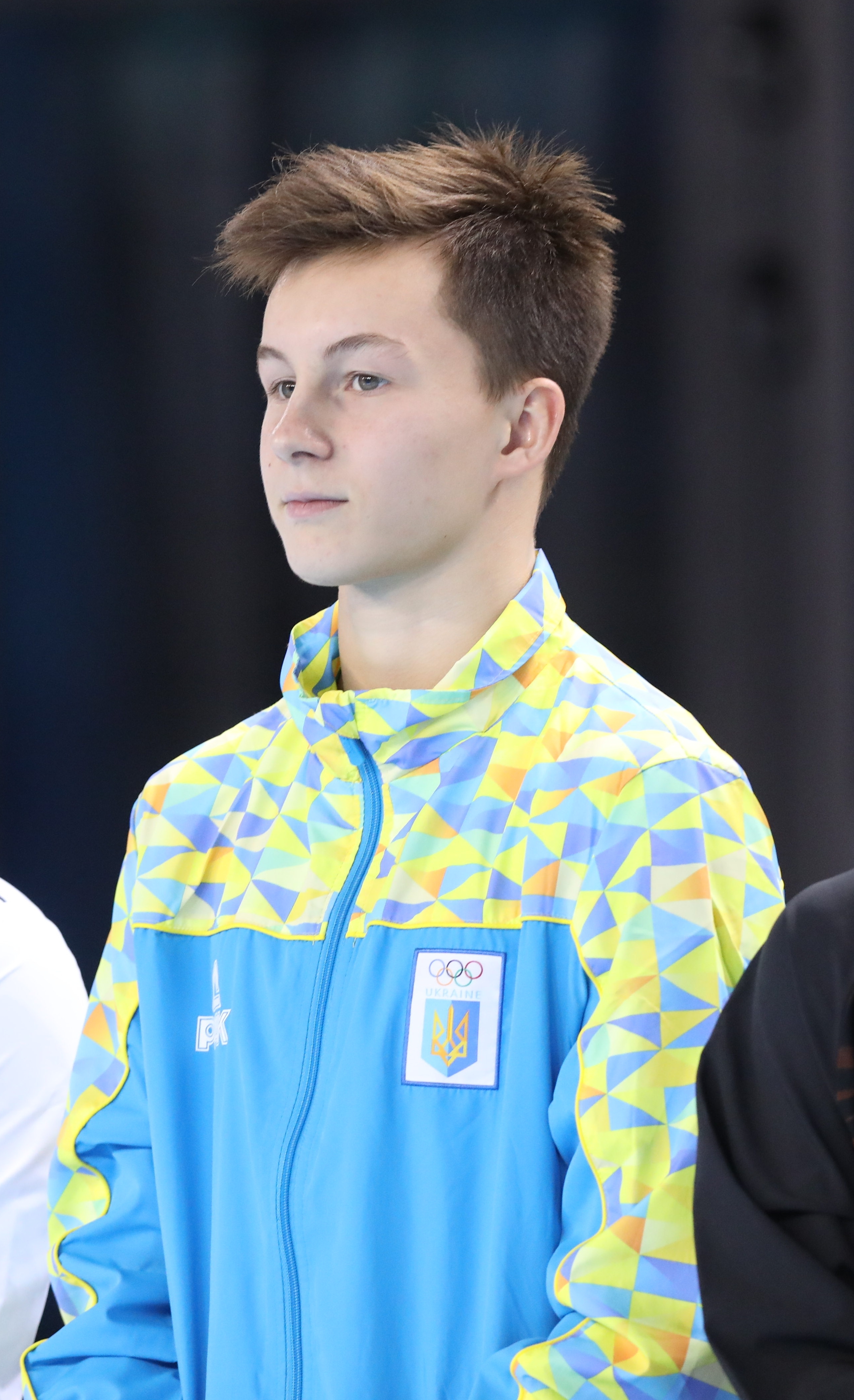

Personal information
- Native name: Олег Сербін
- Full name: Oleh Maksymovych Serbin
- Citizenship: Ukraine
- Born: 11 August 2001 (age 24) Zaporizhia, Ukraine

Sport
- Sport: Diving
Medal record
European Diving Championships
Silver medal – second place	2019 Kyiv	10m synchro
World Junior Championships
Bronze medal – third place	2018 Kyiv	10 m synchro
European Junior Diving Championships
Silver medal – second place	2018 Helsinki	10 m synchro
Silver medal – second place	2019 Kazan	10 m synchro

Oleh Maksymovych Serbin (Ukrainian: Олег Максимович Сербін; born 11 August 2001) is a Ukrainian diver. He is a 2019 European silver medalist in the 10m synchro event.

== Career ==
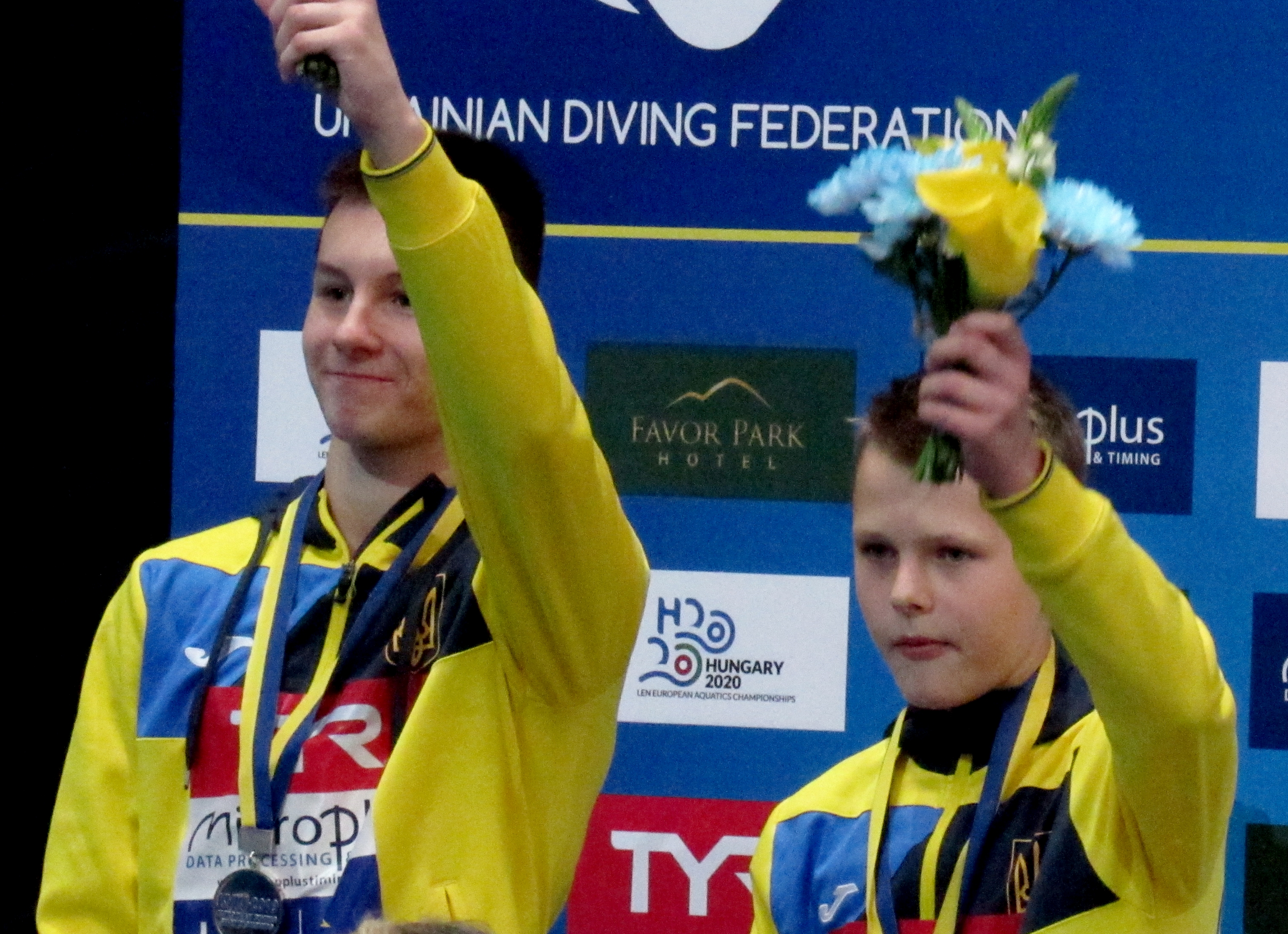
Oleh Serbin and Oleksiy Sereda after winning silver medals in 10m platform synchro diving at the European Championships

Serbin made his Ukrainian national team debut in 2019, at the age of 17. At the World Championships, he placed 4th in synchronized 10m platform diving with his partner, Oleksiy Sereda.

At the 2019 European Diving Championships, Serbin won a silver medal with Sereda in synchronized diving and placed 6th in individual diving.

Serbin and Sereda were members of the Ukrainian delegation during the 2020 Summer Olympics, ending in sixth place at 400.44 points.
