= Yang Hao (diver) =

Chinese diver (born 1998)

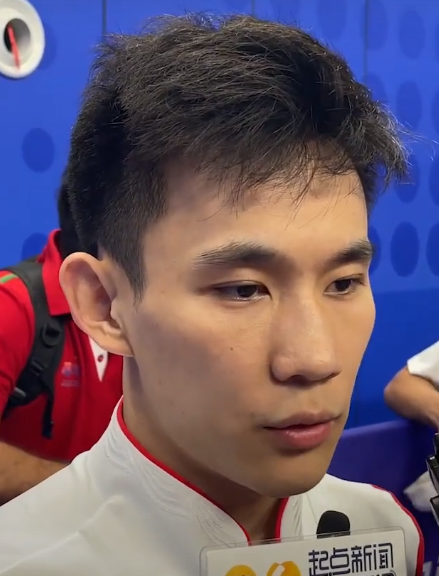
- Yang in 2023

Personal information
- Nationality: Chinese
- Born: 3 February 1998 (age 28) Shiping, China
- Height: 1.65 m (5 ft 5 in)
- Weight: 55 kg (121 lb)

Sport
- Country: China
- Sport: Diving
- Events: 3 m, 3 m synchro, 10 m, 10 m synchro
- Club: Shaanxi
- Partners: Chen Aisen, Li Ping'an
Medal record
Olympic Games
Gold medal – first place	2024 Paris	10 m synchro
World Championships
Gold medal – first place	2015 Kazan	3 m mixed synchro
Gold medal – first place	2017 Budapest	10 m synchro
Gold medal – first place	2022 Budapest	10 m synchro
Gold medal – first place	2023 Fukuoka	10 m synchro
Gold medal – first place	2024 Doha	10 m platform
Gold medal – first place	2024 Doha	10 m synchro
Silver medal – second place	2019 Gwangju	10 m platform
Bronze medal – third place	2022 Budapest	10 m platform
Bronze medal – third place	2023 Fukuoka	10 m platform
Youth Olympic Games
Gold medal – first place	2014 Nanjing	10 m platform
Gold medal – first place	2014 Nanjing	3 m springboard
Asian Games
Gold medal – first place	2022 Hangzhou	10 m platform
Gold medal – first place	2022 Hangzhou	10 m synchro
Gold medal – first place	2026 Aichi–Nagoya	10 m synchro

Yang Hao (simplified Chinese: 杨昊; traditional Chinese: 楊昊; pinyin: Yáng Hào; born 3 February 1998) is a Chinese diver. The main events he competes in are the 10m platform and 3m springboard. He competed in the 2014 Summer Youth Olympics at both men's 10m platform and 3m springboard. At the 2014 Summer Youth Olympics, he won gold medals both in men's 10m platform and in men's 3m springboard.

At the 2015 World Aquatics Championships, he became a new world champion in Team China after winning the gold medal of mixed synchronized 3m springboard.

With Lian Junjie, he won gold in the men's 10 meter synchronized platform event at the 2024 Olympics.

== See also ==
- List of Youth Olympic Games gold medalists who won Olympic gold medals
