= Lian Junjie =

Chinese diver (born 2000)

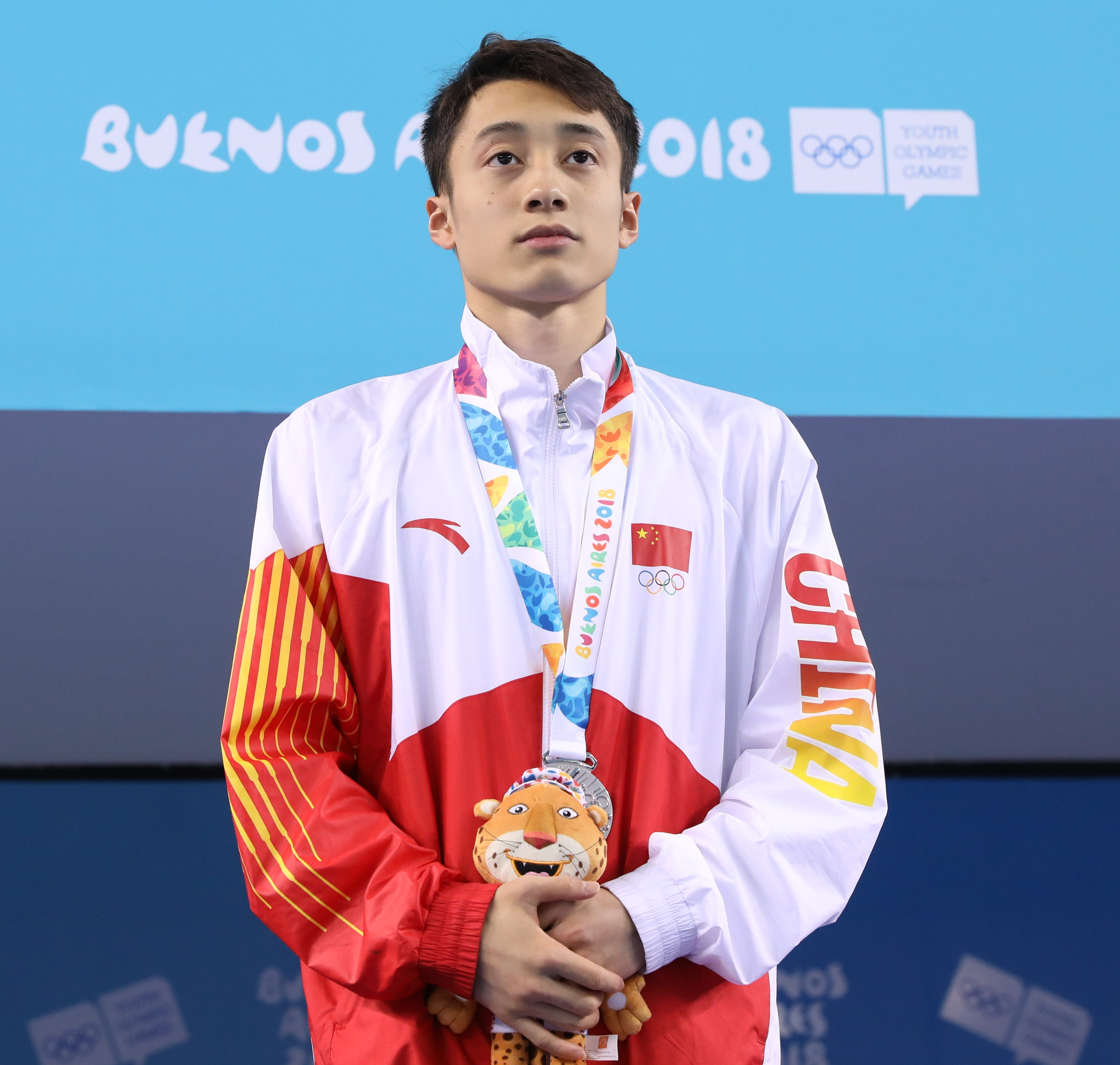
- Lian at the 2018 Summer Youth Olympics

Personal information
- Native name: 练俊杰
- Nationality: Chinese
- Born: 3 November 2000 (age 26) Wuzhou, Guangxi, China
- Height: 167 cm (5 ft 6 in)
- Weight: 57 kg (126 lb)

Sport
- Country: China
- Sport: Diving
- Events: 10 m, 10 m synchro
- Club: Shandong Province
Medal record
Men's diving
Representing China
Event	1st	2nd	3rd
Olympic Games	1	0	0
World Championships	5	1	0
Asian Games	3	0	0
FINA Diving World Cup	1	0	0
Total	10	1	0
Olympic Games
Gold medal – first place	2024 Paris	10 m synchro
World Championships
Gold medal – first place	2017 Budapest	10 m mixed synchro
Gold medal – first place	2019 Gwangju	10 m mixed synchro
Gold medal – first place	2022 Budapest	10 m synchro
Gold medal – first place	2023 Fukuoka	10 m synchro
Gold medal – first place	2024 Doha	10 m synchro
Silver medal – second place	2023 Fukuoka	10 m platform
Asian Games
Gold medal – first place	2022 Hangzhou	10 m synchro
Gold medal – first place	2026 Aichi–Nagoya	10 m platform
Gold medal – first place	2026 Aichi–Nagoya	10 m synchro
Youth Olympic Games
Silver medal – second place	2018 Buenos Aires	10 m platform
Representing Mixed-NOCs team
Youth Olympic Games
Silver medal – second place	2018 Buenos Aires	Mixed team

Lian Junjie (simplified Chinese: 练俊杰; traditional Chinese: 練俊傑; pinyin: Liàn Jùnjié, born 3 November 2000) is a Chinese diver. He won the gold medal of Mixed synchronized 10-metre platform with Ren Qian in 2017 World Aquatics Championships and with Si Yajie in 2018 FINA Diving World Cup. With Yang Hao, he won gold in the men's 10 metre synchronised platform at the 2024 Olympics.
