= Oleksiy Sereda =

Ukrainian diver (born 2005)

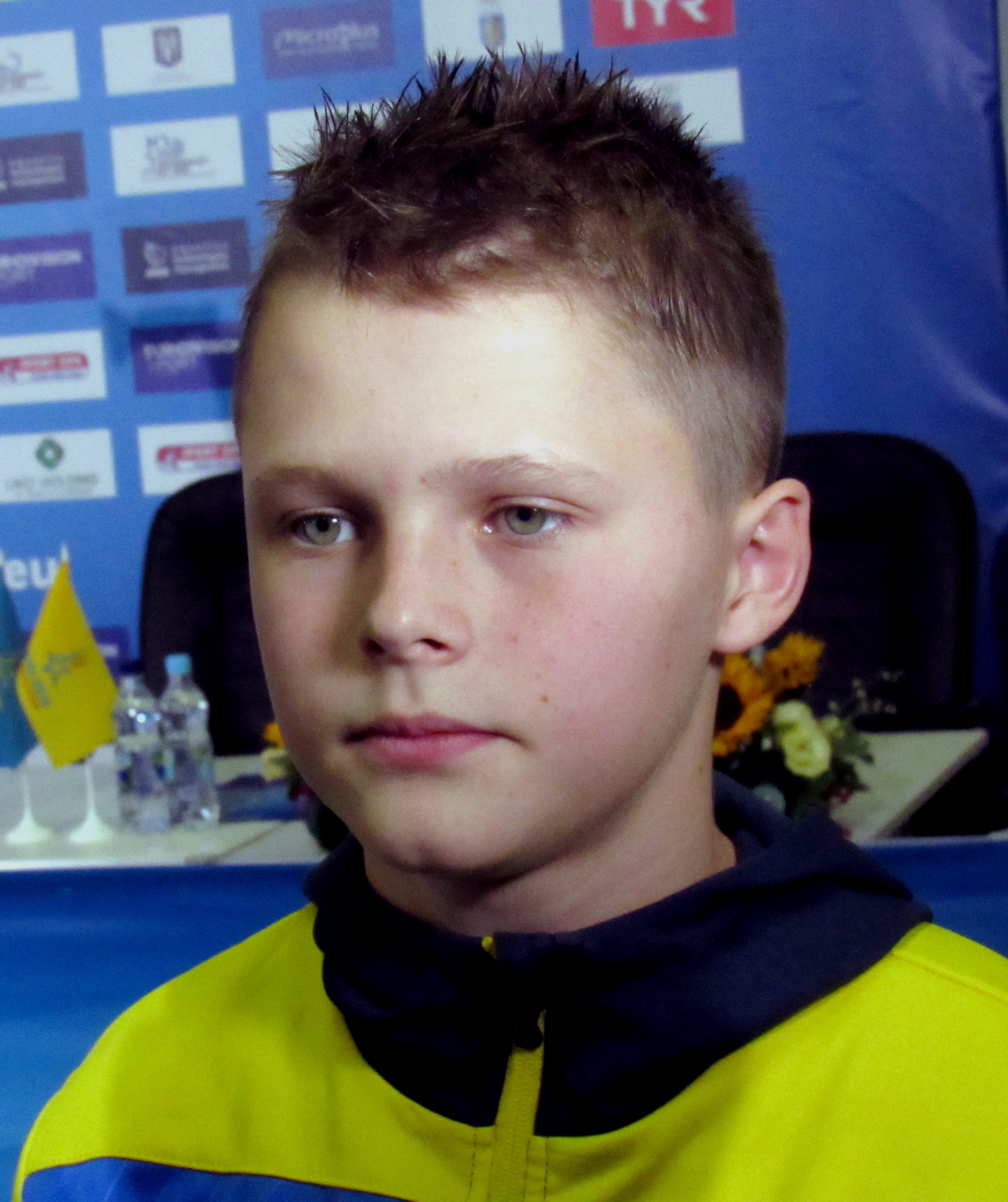
- Sereda in 2019

Personal information
- Native name: Олексій Середа
- Full name: Oleksiy Viktorovych Sereda
- Citizenship: Ukrainian
- Born: 25 December 2005 (age 20) Mykolaiv, Ukraine

Sport
- Country: Ukraine
- Sport: Diving
Medal record
Men's diving
Representing Ukraine
World Championships
Silver medal – second place	2022 Budapest	10 m mixed synchro
Silver medal – second place	2023 Fukuoka	10 m synchro
Silver medal – second place	2025 Singapore	10 m platform
Bronze medal – third place	2024 Doha	10 m synchro
Bronze medal – third place	2024 Doha	10 m platform
World Cup
Silver medal – second place	2023 Berlin	10 m platform
Silver medal – second place	2026 Beijing	10 m synchro
European Games
Gold medal – first place	2023 Kraków–Małopolska	10 m synchro
Gold medal – first place	2023 Kraków–Małopolska	Team
European Championships
Gold medal – first place	2020 Budapest	10 m mixed synchro
Gold medal – first place	2022 Rome	10 m platform
Gold medal – first place	2026 Paris	10 m mixed synchro
Silver medal – second place	2022 Rome	10 m synchro
Silver medal – second place	2022 Rome	10 m mixed synchro
Bronze medal – third place	2026 Paris	Team
Bronze medal – third place	2026 Paris	10 m synchro
European Diving Championships
Gold medal – first place	2019 Kyiv	10 m platform
Gold medal – first place	2023 Rzeszów	10 m synchro
Gold medal – first place	2023 Rzeszów	Team
Gold medal – first place	2025 Antalya	Mixed team
Gold medal – first place	2025 Antalya	10 m platform
Gold medal – first place	2025 Antalya	10 m synchro
Silver medal – second place	2019 Kyiv	10 m synchro
World Junior Championships
Gold medal – first place	2021 Kyiv	10 m platform
Gold medal – first place	2021 Kyiv	10 m synchro
Silver medal – second place	2021 Kyiv	3 m springboard
European Junior Diving Championships
Gold medal – first place	2019 Kazan	10 m platform
Silver medal – second place	2019 Kazan	10 m synchro

Oleksiy Viktorovych Sereda (Ukrainian: Олексій Вікторович Середа; born 25 December 2005) is a Ukrainian diver. He is the 2019 European champion in the 10 metre platform event. He competed in the 2024 Olympic Games for Ukraine.

== Career ==
Sereda made his Ukrainian national team debut in 2019, at the age of 13. At the World Championships he placed 4th in both individual and synchronized (with Oleh Serbin) dives on 10m platform. As a result, he qualified for the 2020 Summer Olympics in individual competitions.

Sereda became the youngest ever Europe champion on 11 August 2019, after winning gold in the individual 10 metre platform competition at the 2019 European Diving Championships. He also won a silver medal with his partner Oleh Serbin in synchronized diving. At the 2020 Olympics in Tokyo he finished 6th in the 10 metre platform event.

The 2022 European Aquatics Championships was a success for 16-year-old Sereda. He won a gold medal in the 10 metre platform with a significant gap over runner-up British diver Noah Williams, a silver medal together with 15-year-old Kirill Boliukh in the 10 metre synchro platform and a silver together with Sofiya Lyskun in the mixed 10 metre synchro platform.

With Boliukh, he placed 5th in the men's 10 metre synchro platform event at the 2024 Olympics.

== Awards ==
LEN: Best Male Diver of the Year (2023, 2025)
