= Cassiel Rousseau =

Australian diver (born 2001)

Personal information
- Full name: Cassiel Emmanuel Rousseau
- Born: 4 February 2001 (age 25) Brisbane, Queensland, Australia

Sport
- Sport: Diving
- Event: 10 metre springboard
Medal record
Men's diving
Representing Australia
World Championships
Gold medal – first place	2023 Fukuoka	10 m platform
Gold medal – first place	2025 Singapore	10 m platform
Silver medal – second place	2025 Singapore	3 m mixed synchro
Bronze medal – third place	2024 Doha	Team event
Commonwealth Games
Gold medal – first place	2022 Birmingham	10 m platform
Bronze medal – third place	2022 Birmingham	10 m synchro
Bronze medal – third place	2022 Birmingham	10 m mixed synchro

Cassiel Emmanuel Rousseau (born 4 February 2001) is an Australian diver. He competed in the 2020 Summer Olympics in the men's 10 metre platform, and the 2024 Summer Olympics in the men's 10 metre platform and men's synchronised 10 metre platform, the latter with Domonic Bedggood. Rousseau claimed gold in the men's 10m platform World Championships event in Fukuoka 2023, creating history for the Australian diving team by becoming the first Australian men's 10m platform world champion.

== Early life and career ==
Rousseau is the grandson of French cyclist Michel Rousseau, who won gold in the men's sprint at the 1956 Summer Olympics. His mother is from Paris, and the family (he is a twin and one of seven children) spoke French at home when he was young. He was a child circus performer and acrobatic gymnast, and appeared in a series final of Australia's Got Talent by age 11. He began diving in 2017, and became Australia's elite junior champion a year later. His older sister Elodie formerly performed with Cirque Du Soleil in Las Vegas.

In June 2022, he was named to the Australian diving team for the 2022 Commonwealth Games. He won a gold medal in the Men's 10 metre platform event and bronze medals in the mixed synchronised 10 metre platform event alongside Emily Boyd and the men's synchronised 10 metre platform alongside Domonic Bedggood.

Rousseau was named World Aquatics diver of the year after winning the men's 10m platform event at the Fukuoka 2023 World Aquatics Championships.

In the 2024 Olympics, he finished 6th in the men's synchronised 10 metre platform.

== Personal life ==
As of 2024, Rousseau was studying psychology at Griffith University and working part-time at LSKD.

== Competitive history ==
Competition	2019	2020	2021	2023	2024	2025
Olympic Games, 10 m platform		8th 430.35			4th	
FINA World Championships, 10 m platform	9th 455.35			1st 520.85		1st
