= Christina Wassen =

German diver (born 1999)

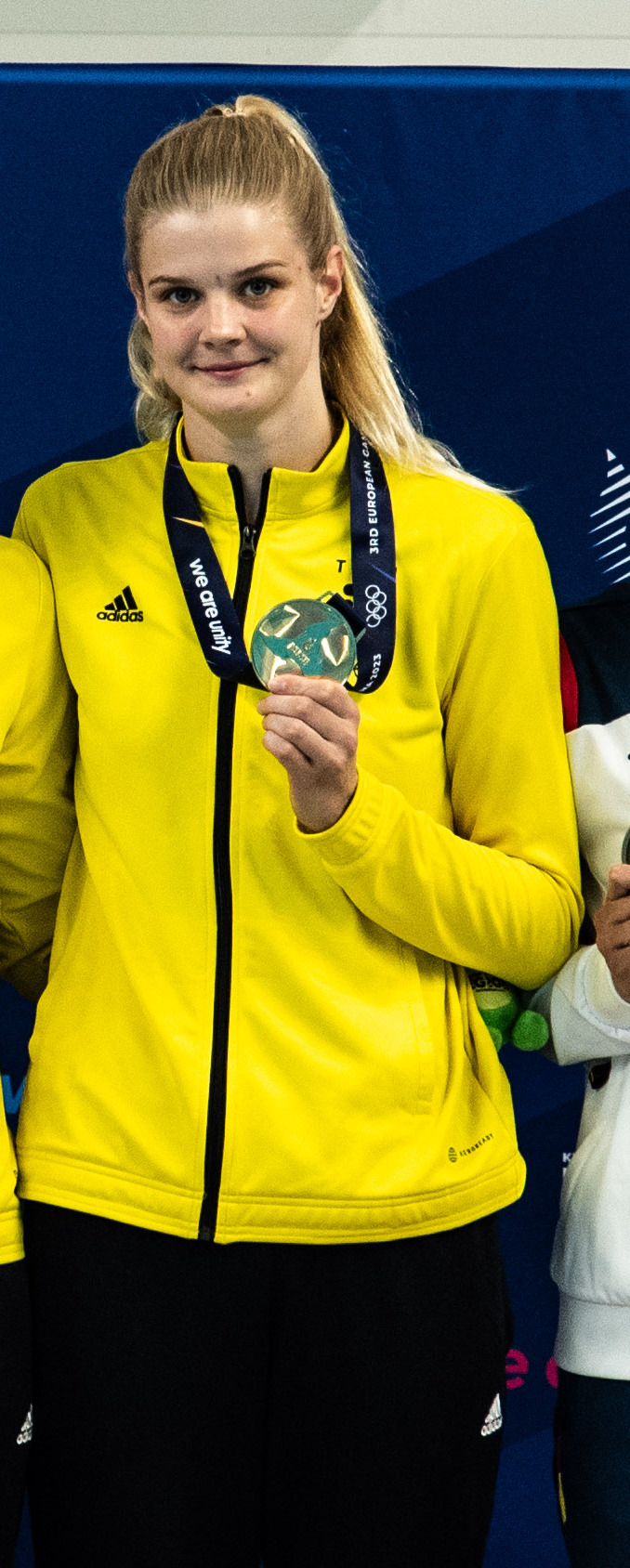

Personal information
- Nationality: German
- Born: 12 January 1999 (age 27) Eschweiler, Germany
- Height: 1.80 m (5 ft 11 in)
- Weight: 68 kg (150 lb)

Sport
- Country: Germany
- Sport: Diving
- Event: 10 m Synchro
- Club: Berliner TSC
Medal record
World Championships
Bronze medal – third place	2023 Fukuoka	Team
European Games
Gold medal – first place	2023 Kraków-Małopolska	10 m synchro
Silver medal – second place	2023 Kraków-Małopolska	10 m platform
European Championships
Bronze medal – third place	2018 Glasgow	10 m mixed synchro
Bronze medal – third place	2020 Budapest	Team event
Bronze medal – third place	2022 Rome	10 m platform
Bronze medal – third place	2022 Rome	10 m synchro
European Diving Championships
Gold medal – first place	2019 Kyiv	Team
Gold medal – first place	2023 Rzeszów	10 m synchro
Silver medal – second place	2023 Rzeszów	10 m platform
Bronze medal – third place	2019 Kyiv	10 m mixed synchro

Christina Wassen (born 12 January 1999) is a German diver.

She won a bronze medal in the 10 m mixed synchro platform competition at the 2018 European Aquatics Championships.
