= Nathan Zsombor-Murray =

Canadian diver

Personal information
- Full name: Nathan Milner Zsombor-Murray
- Born: April 28, 2003 (age 23) Montreal, Quebec, Canada
- Height: 1.76 m (5 ft 9 in)

Sport
- Club: Pointe-Claire Diving Club
Medal record
Men's diving
Representing Canada
Olympic Games
| Bronze medal – third place | 2024 Paris | 10 m synchro |
World Championships
| Bronze medal – third place | 2022 Budapest | 10 m synchro |
Commonwealth Games
| Silver medal – second place | 2022 Birmingham | 10 m synchro |
Pan American Games
| Silver medal – second place | 2019 Lima | 10 m synchro |
| Silver medal – second place | 2023 Santiago | 10 m platform |
| Silver medal – second place | 2023 Santiago | 10 m synchro |
Diving World Cup
| Bronze medal – third place | 2021 Tokyo | 10 m synchro |

Nathan Milner Zsombor-Murray (born April 28, 2003) is a Canadian diver in the platform (10 metre) events. He represented Canada at the 2020 and 2024 Summer Olympics.

== Career ==
At the age of 14, Zsombor-Murray made his World Championships debut in 2017, where he finished in fifth place in the mixed 10 m synchro event with Meaghan Benfeito. At the 2019 edition of the event, along with his partner Vincent Riendeau finished in 11th place in the men's 10 m synchro event. Under a month later, the pair won silver in the same event at the 2019 Pan American Games in Lima, Peru. In the individual event, Zsombor-Murray finished in sixth.

=== 2021 ===
At the 2021 FINA Diving World Cup, Zsombor-Murray and Riendeau won bronze in the 10 m synchro event, claiming Canada an Olympic berth. In June 2021, Zsombor-Murray was officially named to represent Canada at the 2020 Summer Olympics.

In July 2021, Zsombor-Murray won the individual 10 m platform competition at the Canadian trials with two perfect dives. This qualified him to also compete in the individual event in Tokyo.

At the Olympics he finished fifth in the synchronized 10 metre platform event with partner Riendeau but he narrowly missed the final of the 10 metre platform competition, finishing in 13th.

=== 2022 ===
At the 2022 World Aquatics Championships in Budapest, Hungary, Zsombor-Murray won the bronze medal in the synchronized 10 m platform event with partner Rylan Wiens. He competed at the 2022 Commonwealth Games where he won a silver medal in the men's synchronised 10 metre platform event alongside Rylan Wiens and came 4th in the men's 10 metre platform event.

=== 2024 ===
Wiens and Zsombor-Murray won the bronze medal in the men's synchronised 10 metre platform at the 2024 Olympics.
