= Rylan Wiens =

Canadian diver

Personal information
- Full name: Rylan Mackenzie Wiens
- Born: January 2, 2002 (age 24) Calgary, Alberta, Canada
- Home town: Saskatoon, Saskatchewan, Canada
- Height: 172 cm (5 ft 8 in)
- Weight: 58 kg (128 lb)
Medal record
Men's diving
Representing Canada
Olympic Games
Bronze medal – third place	2024 Paris	10 m synchro
World Championships
Bronze medal – third place	2022 Budapest	10 m synchro
Diving World Cup
Bronze medal – third place	2021 Tokyo	10 m platform
Commonwealth Games
Silver medal – second place	2022 Birmingham	10 m platform
Silver medal – second place	2022 Birmingham	10 m synchro
Pan American Games
Silver medal – second place	2023 Santiago	10 m synchro

Rylan Mackenzie Wiens (born January 2, 2002) is a Canadian diver in the platform (10 metre) events. He represented Canada in the 2024 Olympic Games.

== Career ==
Wiens' first major competition was at the 2018 Commonwealth Games, where he competed in the individual and synchro events.

At the 2021 FINA Diving World Cup, Wiens scored a 488.55 in the final, which won him the bronze medal. In July 2021, Wiens finished in second in the individual 10 m platform competition at the Canadian trials. This qualified him to compete in the individual 10 m event in Tokyo, where he placed 19th.

At the 2022 World Aquatics Championships in Budapest, Hungary, Wiens won the bronze medal in the synchronized 10 m platform event with partner Nathan Zsombor-Murray. He competed at the 2022 Commonwealth Games where he won silver medals in the men's 10 metre platform and men's synchronised 10 metre platform events. At the 2024 Summer Olympic Games, he earned a bronze medal in the men's 10 metre synchronised platform event with partner Nathan Zsombor-Murray.

== Personal ==
Wiens currently resides and trains in Saskatoon, Saskatchewan.
