= Domonic Bedggood =

Australian diver

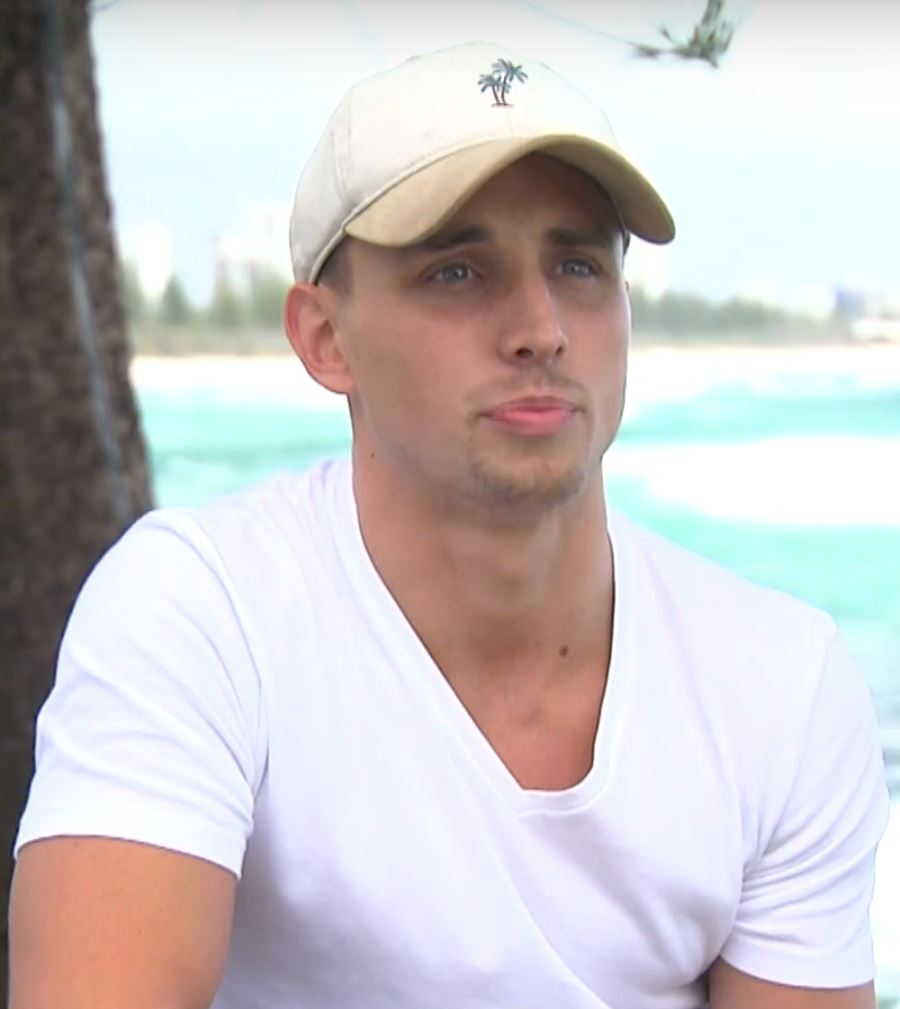
- Bedggood in 2018

Personal information
- Full name: Domonic Paul William Bedggood
- Born: 18 September 1994 (age 31) Gold Coast, Queensland, Australia
- Height: 172 cm (5 ft 8 in)

Sport
- Country: Australia
Medal record
Men's diving
Representing Australia
World Championships
Gold medal – first place	2024 Doha	3 m mixed synchro
Silver medal – second place	2023 Fukuoka	3 m mixed synchro
Bronze medal – third place	2015 Kazan	10 m mixed synchro
Commonwealth Games
Gold medal – first place	2014 Glasgow	10 m synchro
Gold medal – first place	2018 Gold Coast	10 m platform
Bronze medal – third place	2018 Gold Coast	3 m synchro
Bronze medal – third place	2018 Gold Coast	10 m synchro
Bronze medal – third place	2022 Birmingham	10 m synchro

Domonic Paul William Bedggood (born 18 September 1994) is an Australian diver. He was a gold medallist at the 2014 and 2018 Commonwealth Games. He represented Australia at the 2016 Summer Olympics and 2024 Summer Olympics.

== Background ==
Bedggood was born on 18 September 1994 in Southport, a suburb of Queensland's Gold Coast. He was originally a gymnast but turned to diving after breaking his back in a high bar routine gone wrong. Bedggood started diving at the age of sixteen. He trains at the Brisbane Aquatic Centre.

== Career ==
At the 2014 Commonwealth Games in Glasgow, Scotland, he won the Men's Synchronised 10m platform with Matthew Mitcham. At the 2015 World Aquatics Championships in Kazan, Russia, he teamed with Melissa Wu to win a bronze medal in the Mixed 10m Synchronised. At the 2016 Olympics, he placed 12th in the men's 10 metre platform competition.

At the 2018 Commonwealth Games on the Gold Coast, Queensland, Bedggood won a gold medal in the Men's 10m platform and bronze medals in the Men's 3m Synchronized (with Matthew Carter) and the Men's 10m Synchronized (alongside Dec Stacey).

On the second day of diving competition at the 2022 Commonwealth Games, held in Birmingham, England, Bedggood won a bronze medal in the 10 metre synchronized platform with partner Cassiel Rousseau, scoring 412.56 points to finish less than 18 points behind the gold medal duo from England and less than 2 points behind the silver medal duo from Canada. At the 2024 Summer Olympics, he again competed alongside Rousseau in the men's 10 metre synchronized platform, where they ranked 6th.
