= Timo Barthel =

German diver (born 1996)

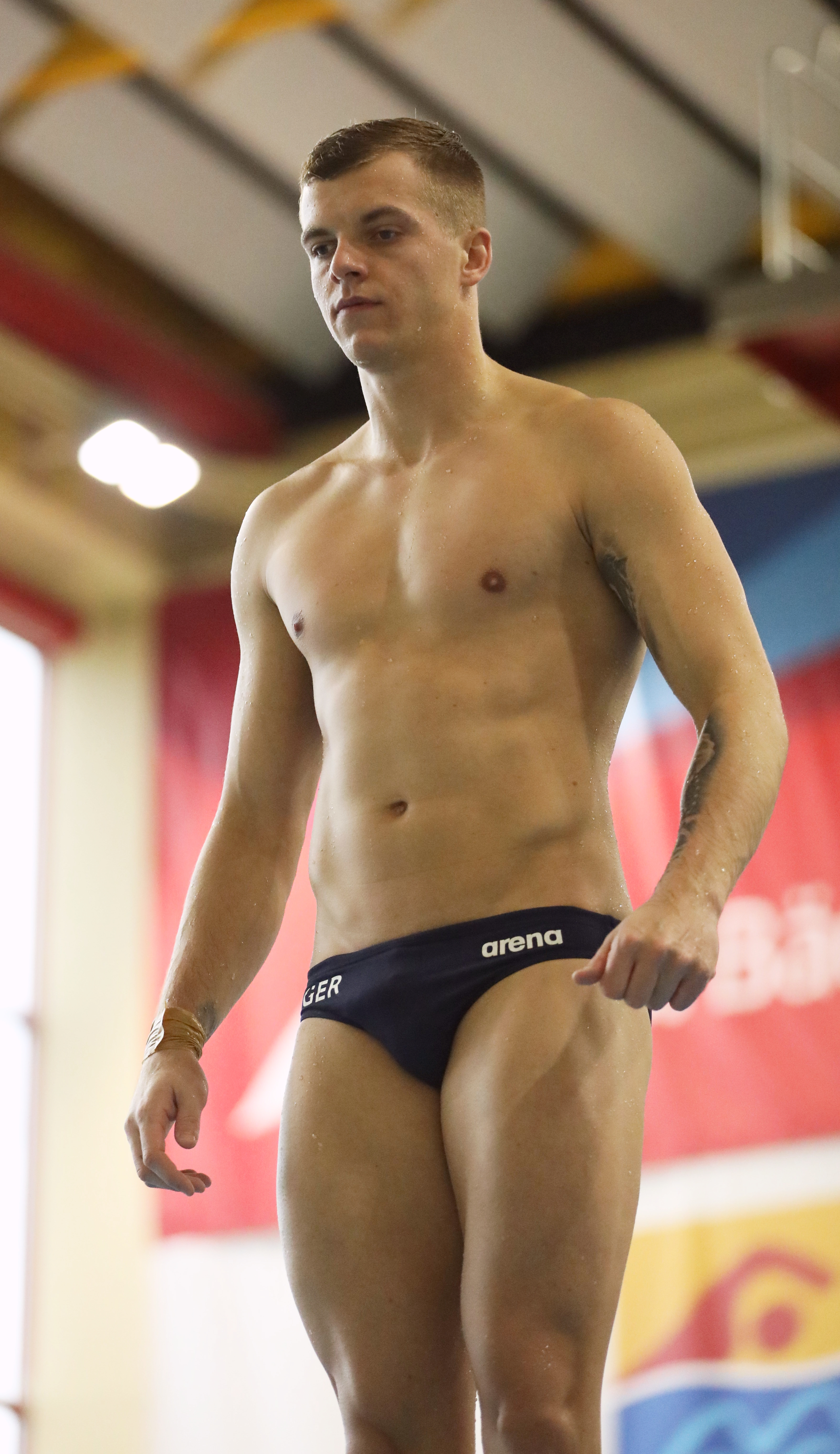

Personal information
- Nationality: German
- Born: 3 April 1996 (age 30) Würselen, Germany
- Height: 1.84 m (6 ft 0 in)
- Weight: 75 kg (165 lb)

Sport
- Country: Germany
- Sport: Diving
- Club: SV Halle
Medal record
Representing Germany
World Championships
Bronze medal – third place	2022 Budapest	3 m synchro
Bronze medal – third place	2023 Fukuoka	Team
European Games
Gold medal – first place	2023 Kraków-Małopolska	10 m platform
European Championships
Bronze medal – third place	2020 Budapest	10 m synchro
Bronze medal – third place	2022 Rome	10 m synchro
European Diving Championships
Gold medal – first place	2023 Rzeszów	10 m platform
Gold medal – first place	2025 Antalya	3 m synchro

Timo Barthel (born 3 April 1996) is a German diver. He specialises in 1-meter, 3-meter and synchronised events. He won the 2015 and 2017 German diving championships and was part of the extended selection for the 2016 Summer Olympics, however he could not secure a place in the final line up. His partner at synchronised event at the 2017 German championships was Florian Fandler. He placed 7th with partner Jaden Eikermann in the 10 meter synchronised platform event at the 2024 Olympics.

Barthel was one of several athletes at the 2024 Summer Olympics who created content via OnlyFans to supplement their income.
