= 2013 FINA Diving World Series =

International diving competition series

The 2013 FINA Diving World Series is the 2013 edition of FINA Diving World Series. The divers who participate are the current world and olympic champions and runners-up, the top 8 divers in the world rankings and along with some wild cards from either the host nation or from certain countries which had previously qualified athletes for the World Series. This World Series was made up by six legs hosted in different cities: 1st leg Beijing, China, 2nd leg Sheffield, United Kingdom, 3rd leg Dubai, United Arab Emirates, 4th leg Moscow, Russia, and 5th and 6th legs Guadalajara, Mexico

== Overall medal tally ==
Rank	Nation	Gold	Silver	Bronze	Total
1	China (CHN)	38	14	4	56
2	Mexico (MEX)	5	6	11	22
3	Ukraine (UKR)	3	3	4	10
4	Russia (RUS)	1	10	9	20
5	Great Britain (GBR)	1	3	5	9
6	Canada (CAN)	0	7	2	9
7	Malaysia (MAS)	0	2	6	8
8	Cuba (CUB)	0	1	4	5
9	Italy (ITA)	0	1	2	3
10	Spain (ESP)	0	1	0	1
11	Germany (GER)	0	0	1	1
Totals (11 entries)		48	48	48	144

== Beijing leg ==
=== Medal table ===
Rank	Nation	Gold	Silver	Bronze	Total
1	China (CHN)	8	2	0	10
2	Canada (CAN)	0	3	0	3
3	Russia (RUS)	0	2	3	5
4	Great Britain (GBR)	0	1	0	1
5	Mexico (MEX)	0	0	2	2
6	Italy (ITA)	0	0	1	1
6	Malaysia (MAS)	0	0	1	1
6	Ukraine (UKR)	0	0	1	1
Totals (8 entries)		8	8	8	24

=== Medal summary ===
==== Men ====
Event	Gold	Silver	Bronze
3 metre springboard	Kai Qin (CHN)	Chong He (CHN)	Ilya Zakharov (RUS)
10 metre platform	Yue Lin (CHN)	Aisen Chen (CHN)	Victor Minibaev (RUS)
Synchronized; 3 metre springboard	Kai Qin (CHN); Chong He (CHN)	Evgeny Kuznetsov (RUS); Ilya Zakharov (RUS)	Yahel Castillo (MEX); Daniel Islas (MEX)
Synchronized; 10 metre platform	Aisen Chen (CHN); Yue Lin (CHN)	Victor Minibaev (RUS); Artem Cheskov (RUS)	Ivan García (MEX); Adán Zúñiga (MEX)

==== Women ====
Event	Gold	Silver	Bronze
3 metre springboard	Zi He (CHN)	Jennifer Abel (CAN)	Tania Cagnotto (ITA)
10 metre platform	Ruolin Chen (CHN)	Meaghan Benfeito (CAN)	Pandelela Rinong Pamg (MAS)
Synchronized; 3 metre springboard	Tingmao Shi (CHN); Minxia Wu (CHN)	Alicia Blagg (GBR); Rebecca Gallantree (GBR)	Anna Pysmenska (UKR); Olena Fedorova (UKR)
Synchronized; 10 metre platform	Ruolin Chen (CHN); Huixia Liu (CHN)	Meaghan Benfeito (CAN); Roseline Filion (CAN)	Yulia Koltunova (RUS); Natalia Goncharova (RUS)

== Dubai leg ==
=== Medal table ===
Rank	Nation	Gold	Silver	Bronze	Total
1	China (CHN)	7	1	1	9
2	Ukraine (UKR)	1	1	1	3
3	Canada (CAN)	0	3	1	4
4	Russia (RUS)	0	1	3	4
5	Italy (ITA)	0	1	0	1
5	Spain (ESP)	0	1	0	1
7	Cuba (CUB)	0	0	1	1
7	Mexico (MEX)	0	0	1	1
Totals (8 entries)		8	8	8	24

=== Medal summary ===
==== Men ====
Event	Gold	Silver	Bronze
3 metre springboard	Illya Kvasha (UKR)	Javier Illana García (ESP)	Chong He (CHN)
10 metre platform	Yue Lin (CHN)	Aisen Chen (CHN)	Victor Minibaev (RUS)
Synchronized; 3 metre springboard	Kai Qin (CHN); Chong He (CHN)	Illya Kvasha (UKR); Oleksiy Pryhorov (UKR)	Yahel Castillo (MEX); Daniel Islas (MEX)
Synchronized; 10 metre platform	Aisen Chen (CHN); Yue Lin (CHN)	Victor Minibaev (RUS); Artem Cheskov (RUS)	Jose Antonio Guerra (CUB); Jeinkler Aguirre (CUB)

==== Women ====
Event	Gold	Silver	Bronze
3 metre springboard	Zi He (CHN)	Jennifer Abel (CAN)	Olena Fedorova (UKR)
10 metre platform	Ruolin Chen (CHN)	Meaghan Benfeito (CAN)	Yulia Koltunova (RUS)
Synchronized; 3 metre springboard	Tingmao Shi (CHN); Minxia Wu (CHN)	Tania Cagnotto (ITA); Francesca Dallape (ITA)	Jennifer Abel (CAN); Pamela Ware (CAN)
Synchronized; 10 metre platform	Ruolin Chen (CHN); Huixia Liu (CHN)	Meaghan Benfeito (CAN); Roseline Filion (CAN)	Yulia Koltunova (RUS); Natalia Goncharova (RUS)

== Edinburgh leg ==
=== Medal table ===
Rank	Nation	Gold	Silver	Bronze	Total
1	China (CHN)	5	3	0	8
2	Russia (RUS)	1	2	0	3
3	Great Britain (GBR)	1	1	1	3
3	Ukraine (UKR)	1	1	1	3
5	Cuba (CUB)	0	1	0	1
6	Mexico (MEX)	0	0	3	3
7	Malaysia (MAS)	0	0	2	2
8	Germany (GER)	0	0	1	1
Totals (8 entries)		8	8	8	24

=== Medal summary ===
==== Men ====
Event	Gold	Silver	Bronze
3 metre springboard	Illya Kvasha (UKR)	Chong He (CHN)	Patrick Hausding (GER)
10 metre platform	Thomas Daley (GBR)	Victor Minibaev (RUS)	Iván García (MEX)
Synchronized; 3 metre springboard	Kai Qin (CHN); Chong He (CHN)	Illya Kvasha (UKR); Oleksiy Pryhorov (UKR)	Christopher Mears (GBR); Nicholas Robinson-Baker (GBR)
Synchronized; 10 metre platform	Victor Minibaev (RUS); Artem Cheskov (RUS)	Antonio Guerra (CUB); Jeinkler Aguirre (CUB)	Iván García (MEX); Germán Sánchez (MEX)

==== Women ====
Event	Gold	Silver	Bronze
3 metre springboard	Zi He (CHN)	Tingmao Shi (CHN)	Olena Fedorova (UKR)
10 metre platform	Yajie Si (CHN)	Huixia Liu (CHN)	Alejandra Orozco (MEX)
Synchronized; 3 metre springboard	Tingmao Shi (CHN); Minxia Wu (CHN)	Alicia Blagg (GBR); Rebecca Gallantree (GBR)	Ng Yan Yee (MAS); Cheong Jun Hoong (MAS)
Synchronized; 10 metre platform	Yajie Si (CHN); Huixia Liu (CHN)	Yulia Koltunova (RUS); Natalia Goncharova (RUS)	Pandelela Rinong (MAS); Leong Mun Yee (MAS)

== Moscow leg ==
=== Medal table ===
Rank	Nation	Gold	Silver	Bronze	Total
1	China (CHN)	7	3	2	12
2	Ukraine (UKR)	1	1	0	2
3	Russia (RUS)	0	3	2	5
4	Malaysia (MAS)	0	1	1	2
5	Mexico (MEX)	0	0	2	2
6	Cuba (CUB)	0	0	1	1
Totals (6 entries)		8	8	8	24

=== Medal summary ===
==== Men ====
Event	Gold	Silver	Bronze
3 metre springboard	Chong He (CHN)	Evgeny Kuznetsov (RUS)	Kai Qin (CHN)
10 metre platform	Yue Lin (CHN)	Victor Minibaev (RUS)	Aisen Chen (CHN)
Synchronized; 3 metre springboard	Illya Kvasha (UKR); Oleksiy Pryhorov (UKR)	Kai Qin (CHN); Chong He (CHN)	Yahel Castillo (MEX); Daniel Islas (MEX)
Synchronized; 10 metre platform	Yue Lin (CHN); Aisen Chen (CHN)	Victor Minibaev (RUS); Artem Cheskov (RUS)	Antonio Guerra (CUB); Jeinkler Aguirre (CUB)

==== Women ====
Event	Gold	Silver	Bronze
3 metre springboard	Tingmao Shi (CHN)	Zi He (CHN)	Laura Sánchez (MEX)
10 metre platform	Yajie Si (CHN)	Ruolin Chen (CHN)	Yulia Koltunova (RUS)
Synchronized; 3 metre springboard	Tingmao Shi (CHN); Minxia Wu (CHN)	Olena Federova (UKR); Anna Pysmenska (UKR)	Ng Yan Yee (MAS); Cheong Jun Hoong (MAS)
Synchronized; 10 metre platform	Yajie Si (CHN); Huixia Liu (CHN)	Pandelela Rinong (MAS); Mun Yee Leong (MAS)	Yulia Koltunova (RUS); Natalia Goncharova (RUS)

== Guadalajara No. 1 leg ==
=== Medal table ===
Rank	Nation	Gold	Silver	Bronze	Total
1	China (CHN)	5	3	1	9
2	Mexico (MEX)	3	2	2	7
3	Canada (CAN)	0	1	1	2
3	Russia (RUS)	0	1	1	2
5	Malaysia (MAS)	0	1	0	1
6	Great Britain (GBR)	0	0	2	2
7	Cuba (CUB)	0	0	1	1
Totals (7 entries)		8	8	8	24

=== Medal summary ===
==== Men ====
Event	Gold	Silver	Bronze
3 metre springboard	Yahel Castillo (MEX)	Shixin Li (CHN)	Chao He (CHN)
10 metre platform	Qiu Bo (CHN)	Iván García (MEX)	Germán Sánchez (MEX)
Synchronized; 3 metre springboard	Yahel Castillo (MEX); Daniel Islas (MEX)	Shixin Li (CHN); Chao He (CHN)	Christopher Mears (GBR); Nicholas Robinson-Baker (GBR)
Synchronized; 10 metre platform	Iván García (MEX); Germán Sánchez (MEX)	Victor Minibaev (RUS); Artem Cheskov (RUS)	Antonio Guerra (CUB); Jeinkler Aguirre (CUB)

==== Women ====
Event	Gold	Silver	Bronze
3 metre springboard	Zi He (CHN)	Laura Sánchez (MEX)	Jennifer Abel (CAN)
10 metre platform	Huixia Liu (CHN)	Yajie Si (CHN)	Yulia Koltunova (RUS)
Synchronized; 3 metre springboard	Zi He (CHN); Han Wang (CHN)	Jennifer Abel (CAN); Pamela Ware (CAN)	Laura Sánchez (MEX); Arantxa Chávez (MEX)
Synchronized; 10 metre platform	Yajie Si (CHN); Huixia Liu (CHN)	Pandelela Rinong (MAS); Mun Yee Leong (MAS)	Tonia Couch (GBR); Sarah Barrow (GBR)

== Guadalajara No. 2 leg ==
=== Medal table ===
Rank	Nation	Gold	Silver	Bronze	Total
1	China (CHN)	6	2	0	8
2	Mexico (MEX)	2	4	1	7
3	Great Britain (GBR)	0	1	2	3
4	Russia (RUS)	0	1	0	1
5	Malaysia (MAS)	0	0	2	2
6	Cuba (CUB)	0	0	1	1
6	Italy (ITA)	0	0	1	1
6	Ukraine (UKR)	0	0	1	1
Totals (8 entries)		8	8	8	24

=== Medal summary ===
==== Men ====
Event	Gold	Silver	Bronze
3 metre springboard	Chao He (CHN)	Yahel Castillo (MEX)	Oleg Kolodiy (UKR)
10 metre platform	Qiu Bo (CHN)	Germán Sánchez (MEX)	Iván García (MEX)
Synchronized; 3 metre springboard	Yahel Castillo (MEX); Daniel Islas (MEX)	Shixin Li (CHN); Chao He (CHN)	Christopher Mears (GBR); Nicholas Robinson-Baker (GBR)
Synchronized; 10 metre platform	Iván García (MEX); Germán Sánchez (MEX)	Victor Minibaev (RUS); Artem Cheskov (RUS)	Antonio Guerra (CUB); Jeinkler Aguirre (CUB)

==== Women ====
Event	Gold	Silver	Bronze
3 metre springboard	Zi He (CHN)	Han Wang (CHN)	Tania Cagnotto (ITA)
10 metre platform	Yajie Si (CHN)	Alejandra Orozco (MEX)	Tonia Couch (GBR)
Synchronized; 3 metre springboard	Zi He (CHN); Han Wang (CHN)	Paola Espinosa (MEX); Dolores Hernández (MEX)	Ng Yan Yee (MAS); Cheong Jun Hoong (MAS)
Synchronized; 10 metre platform	Yajie Si (CHN); Huixia Liu (CHN)	Tonia Couch (GBR); Sarah Barrow (GBR)	Pandelela Rinong (MAS); Mun Yee Leong (MAS)
