= 2014 FINA Diving World Series =

International diving competition series

The 2014 FINA Diving World Series is the eighth edition of FINA Diving World Series. This series consisted of six legs, each hosted in a different country: China, United Arab Emirates, Great Britain, Russia, Canada, and Mexico.

== Overview ==
=== Schedule ===
The series consisted of the following legs:

Location	Date
Beijing, China	14–16 March 2014
Dubai, United Arab Emirates	20–22 March 2014
(United Kingdom) London, Great Britain	25–27 April 2014
Moscow, Russia	2–4 May 2014
Windsor, Ontario, Canada	30 May – 1 June 2014
Monterrey, Mexico	6–8 June 2014

=== Overall medal tally ===
Rank	Nation	Gold	Silver	Bronze	Total
1	China (CHN)	39	20	0	59
2	Russia (RUS)	4	2	5	11
3	Canada (CAN)	2	4	10	16
4	Germany (GER)	2	4	3	9
5	Mexico (MEX)	1	4	4	9
6	Great Britain (GBR)	0	5	9	14
7	Malaysia (MAS)	0	4	4	8
8	Ukraine (UKR)	0	3	7	10
9	Italy (ITA)	0	1	4	5
10	North Korea (PRK)	0	1	0	1
11	Australia (AUS)	0	0	1	1
11	United States (USA)	0	0	1	1
Totals (12 entries)		48	48	48	144

=== Overall ranking ===
Overall ranking is based on the results from the six legs of the series. Divers earned points based on placement at each competition. For individual events, points were counted separately for each person. For synchronized events, points were combined for each country – some countries had different pairs compete at the different legs of the series. Medals were not awarded for overall ranking, but top divers (or countries for synchro) who competed in all six legs earned prize money.

==== Men ====
source: FINA

Event	First	Second	Third
3m springboard	He Chong (CHN)	Illya Kvasha (UKR)	Jack Laugher (GBR)
10m platform	Viktor Minibaev (RUS)	Qiu Bo (CHN)	Tom Daley (GBR)
3m springboard synchro	Cao Yuan & Lin Yue; He Chong & Qin Kai (CHN)	Oleksandr Gorshkovozov & Illya Kvasha (UKR)	Stephan Feck & Patrick Hausding (GER)
10m platform synchro	Cao Yuan & Lin Yue; Yang Jian & Chen Aisen; Tai Xiaohu & Yang Hao (CHN)	Patrick Hausding & Sascha Klein (GER)	Iván García & Germán Sánchez (MEX)

==== Women ====
source: FINA

Event	First	Second	Third
3m springboard	Wang Han (CHN)	He Zi (CHN)	Tania Cagnotto (ITA)
10m platform	Liu Huixia (CHN)	Pandelela Rinong (MAS)	Roseline Filion (CAN)
3m springboard synchro	Shi Tingmao & Wu Minxia; Wang Han & He Zi (CHN)	Tania Cagnotto & Francesca Dallapé (ITA)	Jennifer Abel & Pamela Ware (CAN)
10m platform synchro	Chen Ruolin & Liu Huixia; Huang Xiaohui & Lian Jie (CHN)	Leong Mun Yee & Pandelela Rinong; Cheong Jun Hoong & Pandelela Rinong (MAS)	Sarah Barrow & Tonia Couch (GBR) Meaghan Benfeito & Roseline Filion (CAN)

== Beijing leg ==
sources: FINA and Omega Timing

=== Medal table ===
Rank	Nation	Gold	Silver	Bronze	Total
1	China (CHN)	7	4	0	11
2	Russia (RUS)	1	0	0	1
3	Canada (CAN)	0	2	1	3
4	Malaysia (MAS)	0	1	1	2
5	Germany (GER)	0	1	0	1
6	Great Britain (GBR)	0	0	3	3
7	Ukraine (UKR)	0	0	2	2
8	Mexico (MEX)	0	0	1	1
Totals (8 entries)		8	8	8	24

=== Medal summary ===
==== Men ====
Event	Gold	Silver	Bronze
3m springboard	He Chong (CHN)	Lin Yue (CHN)	Illya Kvasha (UKR)
10m platform	Cao Yuan (CHN)	Qiu Bo (CHN)	Tom Daley (GBR)
3m springboard synchro	Evgeny Kuznetsov & Ilya Zakharov (RUS)	Cao Yuan & Lin Yue (CHN)	Oleksandr Gorshkovozov & Illya Kvasha (UKR)
10m platform synchro	Cao Yuan & Lin Yue (CHN)	Patrick Hausding & Sascha Klein (GER)	Daniel Goodfellow & Matthew Lee (GBR)

==== Women ====
Event	Gold	Silver	Bronze
3m springboard	Wang Han (CHN)	He Zi (CHN)	Pamela Ware (CAN)
10m platform	Liu Huixia (CHN)	Pandelela Rinong (MAS)	Tonia Couch (GBR)
3m springboard synchro	Shi Tingmao & Wu Minxia (CHN)	Jennifer Abel & Pamela Ware (CAN)	Arantxa Chávez & Laura Sánchez (MEX)
10m platform synchro	Chen Ruolin & Liu Huixia (CHN)	Meaghan Benfeito & Roseline Filion (CAN)	Leong Mun Yee & Pandelela Rinong (MAS)

== Dubai leg ==
sources: FINA and Omega Timing

=== Medal table ===
Rank	Nation	Gold	Silver	Bronze	Total
1	China (CHN)	6	4	0	10
2	Germany (GER)	1	1	0	2
3	Russia (RUS)	1	0	0	1
4	Malaysia (MAS)	0	2	0	2
5	Mexico (MEX)	0	1	0	1
6	Canada (CAN)	0	0	2	2
6	Italy (ITA)	0	0	2	2
6	Ukraine (UKR)	0	0	2	2
9	Great Britain (GBR)	0	0	1	1
9	United States (USA)	0	0	1	1
Totals (10 entries)		8	8	8	24

=== Medal summary ===
==== Men ====
Event	Gold	Silver	Bronze
3m springboard	He Chong (CHN)	Cao Yuan (CHN)	Illya Kvasha (UKR)
10m platform	Victor Minibaev (RUS)	Qiu Bo (CHN)	David Boudia (USA)
3m springboard synchro	Stephan Feck & Patrick Hausding (GER)	Cao Yuan & Lin Yue (CHN)	Oleksandr Gorshkovozov & Illya Kvasha (UKR)
10m platform synchro	Cao Yuan & Lin Yue (CHN)	Patrick Hausding & Sascha Klein (GER)	Daniel Goodfellow & Matthew Lee (GBR)

==== Women ====
Event	Gold	Silver	Bronze
3m springboard	He Zi (CHN)	Wang Han (CHN)	Tania Cagnotto (ITA)
10m platform	Liu Huixia (CHN)	Pandelela Rinong (MAS)	Roseline Filion (CAN)
3m springboard synchro	Shi Tingmao & Wu Minxia (CHN)	Arantxa Chávez & Laura Sánchez (MEX)	Tania Cagnotto & Francesca Dallapé (ITA)
10m platform synchro	Chen Ruolin & Liu Huixia (CHN)	Leong Mun Yee & Pandelela Rinong (MAS)	Meaghan Benfeito & Roseline Filion (CAN)

== London leg ==
sources: FINA and Omega Timing

=== Medal table ===
Rank	Nation	Gold	Silver	Bronze	Total
1	China (CHN)	8	2	0	10
2	Ukraine (UKR)	0	2	1	3
3	Canada (CAN)	0	1	2	3
3	Russia (RUS)	0	1	2	3
5	Great Britain (GBR)	0	1	1	2
6	Italy (ITA)	0	1	0	1
7	Germany (GER)	0	0	1	1
7	Malaysia (MAS)	0	0	1	1
Totals (8 entries)		8	8	8	24

=== Medal summary ===
==== Men ====
Event	Gold	Silver	Bronze
3m springboard	He Chong (CHN)	Ilya Zakharov (RUS)	Evgeny Kuznetsov (RUS)
10m platform	Yang Jian (CHN)	Chen Aisen (CHN)	Oleksandr Bondar (UKR)
3m springboard synchro	He Chong & Qin Kai (CHN)	Oleksandr Gorshkovozov & Illya Kvasha (UKR)	Evgeny Kuznetsov & Ilya Zakharov (RUS)
10m platform synchro	Yang Jian & Chen Aisen (CHN)	Oleksandr Bondar & Maksym Dolgov (UKR)	Patrick Hausding & Sascha Klein (GER)

==== Women ====
Event	Gold	Silver	Bronze
3m springboard	He Zi (CHN)	Wang Han (CHN)	Pamela Ware (CAN)
10m platform	Chen Ruolin (CHN)	Meaghan Benfeito (CAN)	Pandelela Rinong (MAS)
3m springboard synchro	Shi Tingmao & Wu Minxia (CHN)	Tania Cagnotto & Francesca Dallapé (ITA)	Hannah Starling & Rebecca Gallantree (GBR)
10m platform synchro	Chen Ruolin & Liu Huixia (CHN)	Sarah Barrow & Tonia Couch (GBR)	Meaghan Benfeito & Roseline Filion (CAN)

== Moscow leg ==
sources: FINA and Omega Timing

=== Medal table ===
Rank	Nation	Gold	Silver	Bronze	Total
1	China (CHN)	5	5	0	10
2	Russia (RUS)	2	1	2	5
3	Mexico (MEX)	1	0	0	1
4	Ukraine (UKR)	0	1	1	2
5	North Korea (PRK)	0	1	0	1
6	Great Britain (GBR)	0	0	2	2
6	Malaysia (MAS)	0	0	2	2
8	Italy (ITA)	0	0	1	1
Totals (8 entries)		8	8	8	24

=== Medal summary ===
==== Men ====
Event	Gold	Silver	Bronze
3m springboard	Evgeny Kuznetsov (RUS)	Illya Kvasha (UKR)	Jack Laugher (GBR)
10m platform	Chen Aisen (CHN)	Yang Jian (CHN)	Viktor Minibaev (RUS)
3m springboard synchro	Evgeny Kuznetsov & Ilya Zakharov (RUS)	He Chong & Qin Kai (CHN)	Jack Laugher & Chris Mears (GBR)
10m platform synchro	Iván García & Germán Sánchez (MEX)	Chen Aisen & Yang Jian (CHN)	Viktor Minibaev & Roman Izmailov (RUS)

==== Women ====
Event	Gold	Silver	Bronze
3m springboard	He Zi (CHN)	Wang Han (CHN)	Tania Cagnotto (ITA)
10m platform	Liu Huixia (CHN)	Chen Ruolin (CHN)	Yulia Prokopchuk (UKR)
3m springboard synchro	Wu Minxia & Shi Tingmao (CHN)	Maria Polyakova & Kristina Ilinykh (RUS)	Cheong Jun Hoong & Ng Yan Yee (MAS)
10m platform synchro	Chen Ruolin & Liu Huixia (CHN)	Choe Kyong-un & Song Nam-hyang (PRK)	Pandelela Rinong & Leong Mun Yee (MAS)

== Windsor leg ==
sources: FINA and Omega Timing

=== Medal table ===
Rank	Nation	Gold	Silver	Bronze	Total
1	China (CHN)	7	3	0	10
2	Canada (CAN)	1	1	2	4
3	Germany (GER)	0	2	1	3
3	Great Britain (GBR)	0	2	1	3
5	Australia (AUS)	0	0	1	1
5	Italy (ITA)	0	0	1	1
5	Mexico (MEX)	0	0	1	1
5	Ukraine (UKR)	0	0	1	1
Totals (8 entries)		8	8	8	24

=== Medal summary ===
==== Men ====
Event	Gold	Silver	Bronze
3m springboard	He Chong (CHN)	Jack Laugher (GBR)	Illya Kvasha (UKR)
10m platform	Cao Yuan (CHN)	Qiu Bo (CHN)	Sascha Klein (GER)
3m springboard synchro	Lin Yue & Cao Yuan (CHN)	Stephan Feck & Patrick Hausding (GER)	Jack Laugher & Chris Mears (GBR)
10m platform synchro	Lin Yue & Cao Yuan (CHN)	Patrick Hausding & Sascha Klein (GER)	Iván García & Germán Sánchez (MEX)

==== Women ====
Event	Gold	Silver	Bronze
3m springboard	Shi Tingmao (CHN)	Wang Han (CHN)	Jennifer Abel (CAN)
10m platform	Huang Xiaohui (CHN)	Liu Huixia (CHN)	Roseline Filion (CAN)
3m springboard synchro	Wang Han & He Zi (CHN)	Pamela Ware & Jennifer Abel (CAN)	Tania Cagnotto & Francesca Dallapé (ITA)
10m platform synchro	Meaghan Benfeito & Roseline Filion (CAN)	Sarah Barrow & Tonia Couch (GBR)	Emily Boyd & Lara Tarvit (AUS)

== Monterrey leg ==
sources: FINA and Omega Timing

=== Medal table ===
Rank	Nation	Gold	Silver	Bronze	Total
1	China (CHN)	6	2	0	8
2	Canada (CAN)	1	0	3	4
3	Germany (GER)	1	0	1	2
4	Mexico (MEX)	0	3	2	5
5	Great Britain (GBR)	0	2	1	3
6	Malaysia (MAS)	0	1	0	1
7	Russia (RUS)	0	0	1	1
Totals (7 entries)		8	8	8	24

=== Medal summary ===
==== Men ====
Event	Gold	Silver	Bronze
3m springboard	Patrick Hausding (GER)	He Chong (CHN)	Jack Laugher (GBR)
10m platform	Qiu Bo (CHN)	Tom Daley (GBR)	Victor Minibaev (RUS)
3m springboard synchro	Cao Yuan & Lin Yue (CHN)	Jack Laugher & Chris Mears (GBR)	Jahir Ocampo & Rommel Pacheco (MEX)
10m platform synchro	Tai Xiaohu & Yang Hao (CHN)	Iván García & Germán Sánchez (MEX)	Patrick Hausding & Sascha Klein (GER)

==== Women ====
Event	Gold	Silver	Bronze
3m springboard	Shi Tingmao (CHN)	Laura Sánchez (MEX)	Jennifer Abel (CAN)
10m platform	Meaghan Benfeito (CAN)	Liu Huixia (CHN)	Alejandra Estrella (MEX)
3m springboard synchro	He Zi & Wang Han (CHN)	Dolores Hernández & Laura Sánchez (MEX)	Jennifer Abel & Pamela Ware (CAN)
10m platform synchro	Huang Xiaohui & Lian Jie (CHN)	Cheong Jun Hoong & Pandelela Rinong (MAS)	Meaghan Benfeito & Roseline Filion (CAN)
