= Diving at the 2015 World Aquatics Championships – Men's synchronized 10 metre platform =

Men's synchronized 10 metre platform at the 2015 World Aquatics Championships
- Dates: 26 July
- Competitors: 40 from 20 nations
- Winning points: 495.72

Medalists
| gold medal | Chen Aisen; Lin Yue | China |
| silver medal | Iván García; Germán Sánchez | Mexico |
| bronze medal | Roman Izmailov; Viktor Minibaev | Russia |

The Men's synchronized 10 metre platform competition of the diving events at the 2015 World Aquatics Championships was held on 26 July 2015.

== Results ==
The preliminary round was held at 10:00. The final was held at 19:30.

Green denotes finalists

| Rank | Nation | Divers | Preliminary | | Final | |
| Rank | Nation | Divers | Points | Rank | Points | Rank |
|---|---|---|---|---|---|---|
| 1st place, gold medalist(s) | China | Chen Aisen; Lin Yue | 470.13 | 1 | 495.72 | 1 |
| 2nd place, silver medalist(s) | Mexico | Iván García; Germán Sánchez | 419.19 | 5 | 448.89 | 2 |
| 3rd place, bronze medalist(s) | Russia | Roman Izmailov; Viktor Minibaev | 443.07 | 3 | 441.33 | 3 |
| 4 | Ukraine | Maksym Dolgov; Oleksandr Horshkovozov | 419.07 | 6 | 436.50 | 4 |
| 5 | United States | David Boudia; Steele Johnson | 451.02 | 2 | 436.35 | 5 |
| 6 | Germany | Patrick Hausding; Sascha Klein | 421.92 | 4 | 431.34 | 6 |
| 7 | South Korea | Kim Yeong-nam; Woo Ha-ram | 417.24 | 7 | 421.80 | 7 |
| 8 | Colombia | Víctor Ortega; Juan Ríos | 409.92 | 8 | 405.03 | 8 |
| 9 | Great Britain | James Denny; Matthew Lee | 379.86 | 12 | 396.84 | 9 |
| 10 | Malaysia | Chew Yiwei; Ooi Tze Liang | 383.40 | 11 | 386.52 | 10 |
| 11 | North Korea | Hyon Il-myong; Kim Sun-bom | 385.08 | 10 | 378.18 | 11 |
| 12 | Australia | Domonic Bedggood; James Connor | 388.80 | 9 | 375.12 | 12 |
| 13 | Belarus | Vadim Kaptur; Yauheni Karaliou | 373.92 | 13 | | |
| 14 | Canada | Philippe Gagné; Vincent Riendeau | 372.78 | 14 | | |
| 15 | Cuba | Jeinkler Aguirre; José Guerra | 367.38 | 15 | | |
| 16 | Italy | Francesco Dell'Uomo; Maicol Verzotto | 362.55 | 16 | | |
| 17 | Venezuela | Óscar Ariza; Robert Páez | 344.70 | 17 | | |
| 18 | Norway | Filip Devor; Daniel Jensen | 342.87 | 18 | | |
| 19 | Brazil | Jackson Oliveira; Isaac Souza | 335.91 | 19 | | |
| 20 | Indonesia | Andriyan Andriyan; Adityo Putra | 311.97 | 20 | | |
