= 2010 FINA Diving World Cup – Men's 10 m synchro platform =

The finals competition of the men's 10 metre platform synchronized was held on June 5, the fourth day of the 2010 FINA Diving World Cup.

== Results ==
Green denotes finalists

Rank	Diver	Nationality	Preliminary		Final	
Rank	Diver	Nationality	Points	Rank	Points	Rank
1st place, gold medalist(s)	Yuan Cao; Yanquan Zhang	China	471.69	1	500.46	1
2nd place, silver medalist(s)	Victor Minibaev; Ilya Zakharov	Russia	429.72	3	492.90	2
3rd place, bronze medalist(s)	José Guerra; Jeinkler Aguirre	Cuba	418.86	5	462.60	3
4	David Boudia; Nick McCrory	United States	401.19	8	448.89	4
5	Sascha Klein; Patrick Hausding	Germany	435.00	2	435.93	5
6	Max Brick; Peter Waterfield	Great Britain	412.89	6	427.38	6
7	German Sanchez; Ivan Garcia	Mexico	420.42	4	421.80	7
8	Kaptur Vadim; Hordeichik Timofei	Belarus	412.86	7	418.14	8
9	Juan Uran; Victor Ortega	Colombia	398.52	9	412.44	9
10	Anton Zakharov; Dmytro Mezhenskyi	Ukraine	381.09	10	400.53	10
11	Hugo Parisi; Rui Marinho	Brazil	379.92	11	393.12	11
12	Oh Yi taek Kim Jin Yong	South Korea	356.60	12	362.28	12
13	Shahnam Nazarpour; Mojtaba Valipour	Iran	319.29	13		
