= Diving at the 2011 Pan American Games – Men's synchronized 10 metre platform =

Men's synchronized 10 metre platform at the 2011 Pan American Games
- Venue: Scotiabank Aquatics Center
- Dates: October 28
- Competitors: 14 from 7 nations

Medalists
Gold medal	Ivan Garcia; German Sanchez	Mexico
Silver medal	Jeinkler Aguerro; Jose Guerra	Cuba
Bronze medal	Kevin Geyson; Eric Sehn	Canada

The men's synchronized 10 metre platform competition of the diving events at the 2011 Pan American Games was held on October 28 at the Scotiabank Aquatics Center. The defending Pan American Games champion were David Boudia and Thomas Finchum of the United States.

The synchronized diving competitions all consist of one rounds. All teams compete in a single round of six dives.

Eleven judges evaluate each dive, three each for each individual diver, and five for the synchronization, giving the diver/dive a score between 0 and 10 with increments of 0.5. The highest and lowest scores from each judge for each individual diver and the highest and lowest scores for synchronization are dropped. The remaining five scores are added together and multiplied by the degree of difficulty to get the raw score. The raw score is then multiplied by 0.6 to get the final score for the dive.

== Schedule ==
All times are Central Daylight Time (UTC-5).

Day	Date	Start	Round
Day 15	October 28	19:30	Finals

== Results ==
The final round was held on October 28.

Rank	Divers	Nationality	Points
1st place, gold medalist(s)	Ivan Garcia; German Sanchez	Mexico	479.88
2nd place, silver medalist(s)	Jeinkler Aguirre; Jose Guerra	Cuba	447.57
3rd place, bronze medalist(s)	Kevin Geyson; Eric Sehn	Canada	399.93
4	Thomas Finchum; Drew Livingston	United States	391.92
5	Víctor Ortega; Juan Rios	Colombia	385.68
6	Rui Marinho; Hugo Parisi	Brazil	373.65
7	Edickson Contreras; Enrique Rojas	Venezuela	362.64
