= Diving at the 2009 World Aquatics Championships – Men's synchronized 10 metre platform =

== Results ==
Green denotes finalists

Rank	Diver	Nationality	Preliminary		Final	
Rank	Diver	Nationality	Points	Rank	Points	Rank
1st place, gold medalist(s)	Huo Liang; Lin Yue	China	480.06	1	482.58	1
2nd place, silver medalist(s)	David Boudia; Thomas Finchum	United States	426.54	4	456.84	2
3rd place, bronze medalist(s)	José Guerra; Jeinkler Aguirre	Cuba	427.38	3	456.60	3
4	Patrick Hausding; Sascha Klein	Germany	447.24	2	455.76	4
5	Andrea Chiarabini; Francesco Dell'Uomo	Italy	386.61	11	411.03	5
6	Kwon Kyung-Min; Cho Kwan-Hoon	South Korea	362.46	12	408.84	6
7	Riley McCormick; Reuben Ross	Canada	423.72	5	406.98	7
8	Iván García; Germán Sánchez	Mexico	407.28	6	400.83	8
9	Max Brick; Tom Daley	Great Britain	396.36	10	390.36	9
10	Victor Minibaev; Ilya Zakharov	Russia	405.51	7	389.91	10
11	Vadim Kaptur; Aliaksandr Varlamau	Belarus	404.07	8	385.77	11
12	Oleksandr Bondar; Oleksandr Gorshkovozov	Ukraine	397.62	9	384.87	12
13	Rui Marinho; Hugo Parisi	Brazil	356.01	13		
14	Edickson Contreras; Enrique Rojas	Venezuela	338.91	14		
