= Diving at the 2015 Pan American Games – Men's 10 metre platform =

Men's 10 metre platform at the 2015 Pan American Games
- Venue: CIBC Pan Am/Parapan Am Aquatics Centre and Field House
- Dates: July 12
- Competitors: 15 from 10 nations
- Winning score: 521.70

Medalists
Gold medal	Iván García	Mexico
Silver medal	Víctor Ortega	Colombia
Bronze medal	Jonathan Ruvalcaba	Mexico

The men's 10 metre platform competition of the diving events at the 2015 Pan American Games was held on July 12 at the CIBC Pan Am/Parapan Am Aquatics Centre and Field House in Toronto, Canada. The winner of the competition will qualify his country a quota place for the 2016 Summer Olympics in Rio de Janeiro, Brazil. If the host nation of the Olympics wins the event, the runner up will qualify instead.

The individual diving competitions all consist of two rounds. In the first, the divers each perform five dives. All divers advance to the finals. In the final round, the divers perform a final set of five dives, with the scores from those dives (and only those dives) used to determine final ranking.

Seven judges evaluate each dive, giving the diver a score between 0 and 10 with increments of 0.5; scores below 7.0 or above 9.5 are rare. The two highest and two lowest scores from each judge are dropped. The remaining three scores are summed, and multiplied by the degree of difficulty of the dive to give the total score for the dive. Scores from each dive in the round are summed to give the round score.

== Schedule ==
Date	Time	Round
July 12, 2015	14:00 ET	Preliminary
July 12, 2015	20:00 ET	Final

== Results ==
Green denotes finalists

Rank	Diver	Nationality	Preliminary		Final	
Rank	Diver	Nationality	Points	Rank	Points	Rank
1st place, gold medalist(s)	Iván García	Mexico	437.55	2	521.70	1
2nd place, silver medalist(s)	Víctor Ortega	Colombia	420.00	6	455.15	2
3rd place, bronze medalist(s)	Jonathan Ruvalcaba	Mexico	428.65	4	437.35	3
4	Jeinkler Aguirre	Cuba	346.80	12	419.60	4
5	Vincent Riendeau	Canada	430.75	3	419.35	5
6	Sebastián Villa	Colombia	442.85	1	393.45	6
7	Maxim Bouchard	Canada	425.15	5	374.00	7
8	Hugo Parisi	Brazil	415.30	7	364.50	8
9	Zachary Cooper	United States	404.40	8	355.35	9
10	Ryan Hawkins	United States	380.90	9	351.15	10
11	Robert Páez	Venezuela	348.05	11	348.25	11
12	Rafael Quintero	Puerto Rico	378.65	10	328.80	12
13	Jackson Rondinelli	Brazil	296.80	13	—N/a	—N/a
14	Jonatan Posligua	Ecuador	242.90	14	—N/a	—N/a
15	Frandiel Gomez	Dominican Republic	234.15	15	—N/a	—N/a

=== Detailed Results ===
==== Preliminary ====
Rank	Diver	Nationality	Preliminary											
Rank	Diver	Nationality	Dive 1	Rank	Dive 2	Rank	Dive 3	Rank	Dive 4	Rank	Dive 5	Rank	Dive 6	Grand Total
1	Sebastián Villa	Colombia	85.75	1	152.35 (66.60)	3	224.10 (71.75)	4	285.15 (61.05)	4	354.45 (69.30)	4	88.40	442.85
2	Iván García	Mexico	84.15	2	176.65 (92.50)	1	243.25 (66.60)	1	314.65 (71.40)	1	384.35 (69.70)	1	53.20	437.55
3	Vincent Riendeau	Canada	76.50	4	159.00 (82.50)	2	224.60 (65.60)	3	298.85 (74.25)	2	365.15 (66.30)	2	65.60	430.75
4	Jonathan Ruvalcaba	Mexico	75.20	5	147.35 (72.15)	6	224.75 (77.40)	2	284.25 (59.50)	6	352.65 (68.40)	5	76.00	428.65
5	Maxim Bouchard	Canada	58.50	12	131.10 (72.60)	10	206.30 (75.20)	9	287.15 (80.85)	3	363.95 (76.80)	3	61.20	425.15
6	Víctor Ortega	Colombia	72.00	7	138.00 (66.00)	8	197.40 (59.40)	10	269.40 (72.00)	8	348.60 (79.20)	7	71.40	420.00
7	Hugo Parisi	Brazil	75.20	5	148.70 (73.50)	4	221.30 (72.60)	7	284.30 (63.00)	5	352.30 (68.00)	6	63.00	415.30
8	Zachary Cooper	United States	81.60	3	147.60 (66.00)	5	223.20 (75.60)	5	274.20 (51.00)	7	337.20 (63.00)	8	67.20	404.40
9	Ryan Hawkins	United States	61.50	10	143.10 (81.60)	7	222.30 (79.20)	6	259.70 (37.40)	10	298.10 (38.40)	10	82.80	380.90
10	Rafael Quintero	Puerto Rico	40.00	15	112.15 (72.15)	13	174.55 (62.40)	11	244.95 (70.40)	11	320.85 (75.90)	9	57.80	378.65
11	Robert Páez	Venezuela	65.10	8	128.10 (63.00)	12	156.90 (28.80)	13	227.30 (70.40)	12	293.60 (66.30)	11	54.45	348.05
12	Jeinkler Aguirre	Cuba	63.00	9	135.60 (72.60)	9	212.40 (76.80)	8	260.40 (48.00)	9	291.00 (30.60)	12	55.80	346.80
13	Jackson Rondinelli	Brazil	60.00	11	130.40 (70.40)	11	166.70 (36.30)	12	205.10 (109.55)	13	268.00 (62.90)	13	28.80	296.80
14	Jonatan Posligua	Ecuador	52.50	14	93.10 (40.60)	15	119.70 (26.60)	15	169.70 (50.00)	14	213.20 (43.50)	14	29.70	242.90
15	Frandiel Gomez	Dominican Republic	54.00	13	96.90 (42.90)	14	130.50 (33.60)	14	130.50 (0.00)	15	171.75 (41.25)	15	62.40	234.15

==== Final ====
Rank	Diver	Nationality	Final											
Rank	Diver	Nationality	Dive 1	Rank	Dive 2	Rank	Dive 3	Rank	Dive 4	Rank	Dive 5	Rank	Dive 6	Grand Total
1	Iván García	Mexico	79.20	2	162.45 (83.25)	1	247.05 (84.60)	1	343.95 (96.90)	1	436.20 (92.25)	1	85.50	521.70
2	Víctor Ortega	Colombia	73.60	4	139.60 (66.00)	4	215.50 (75.90)	3	284.30 (68.80)	4	368.45 (84.15)	2	86.70	455.15
3	Jonathan Ruvalcaba	Mexico	73.60	4	134.65 (61.05)	6	215.65 (81.00)	2	287.05 (71.40)	3	351.85 (64.80)	3	85.50	437.35
4	Jeinkler Aguirre	Cuba	72.00	6	121.50 (49.50)	9	185.50 (64.00)	8	270.30 (84.80)	6	333.20 (62.90)	5	86.40	419.60
4	Vincent Riendeau	Canada	63.00	10	124.05 (61.05)	8	200.85 (76.80)	6	296.95 (95.70)	2	344.15 (47.60)	4	75.20	419.35
6	Sebastián Villa	Colombia	85.75	1}	119.95 (34.20)	11	172.45 (52.50)	10	239.05 (66.60)	8	305.05 (66.00)	7	88.40	393.45
7	Maxim Bouchard	Canada	76.50	3	127.65 (51.15)	7	209.25 (81.60)	4	220.80 (11.55)	12	299.20 (78.40)	8	74.80	374.00
8	Hugo Parisi	Brazil	48.00	12	120.00 (72.00)	10	169.50 (49.50)	12	241.50 (72.00)	7	292.50 (51.00)	9	72.00	364.50
9	Zachary Cooper	United States	67.20	9	134.85 (67.65)	5	172.65 (37.80)	9	223.65 (51.00)	11	288.15 (64.50)	10	67.20	355.35
10	Ryan Hawkins	United States	70.50	7	142.50 (72.00)	2	190.35 (47.85)	7	237.95 (47.60)	9	268.35 (30.40)	12	82.80	351.15
11	Robert Páez	Venezuela	68.20	8	140.20 (72.00)	3	207.40 (67.20)	5	277.80 (70.40)	5	316.90 (39.10)	6	31.35	348.25
12	Rafael Quintero	Puerto Rico	62.40	11	106.80 (44.40)	12	172.40 (65.60)	11	230.00 (57.60)	10	279.50 (49.50)	11	49.30	328.80
