= Diving at the 2015 Pan American Games – Men's synchronized 10 metre platform =

Men's synchronized 10 metre platform at the 2015 Pan American Games
- Venue: CIBC Pan Am/Parapan Am Aquatics Centre and Field House
- Dates: July 13
- Competitors: 10 from 5 nations
- Winning score: 439.14

Medalists
Gold medal	Jeinkler Aguirre; Jose Antonio Guerra	Cuba
Silver medal	Vincent Riendeau; Philippe Gagné	Canada
Bronze medal	Víctor Ortega; Juan Guillermo Rios	Colombia

The men's synchronized 10 metre platform competition of the diving events at the 2015 Pan American Games will be held on July 13 at the CIBC Pan Am/Parapan Am Aquatics Centre and Field House in Toronto, Canada. The winner of the competition will qualify his country a quota place for the 2016 Summer Olympics in Rio de Janeiro, Brazil. If the host nation of the Olympics wins the event, the runner up will qualify instead.

The synchronized diving competitions all consist of one round. All teams compete in a single round of six dives.

Seven judges evaluate each dive, giving the diver a score between 0 and 10 with increments of 0.5; scores below 7.0 or above 9.5 are rare. The two highest and two lowest scores from each judge are dropped. The remaining three scores are summed, and multiplied by the degree of difficulty of the dive to give the total score for the dive. Scores from each dive in the round are summed to give the round score.

== Schedule ==
Date	Time	Round
July 13, 2015	19:45	Finals

== Results ==
Rank	Divers	Nationality	Points
1st place, gold medalist(s)	Jeinkler Aguirre; José Guerra	Cuba	439.14
2nd place, silver medalist(s)	Vincent Riendeau; Philippe Gagné	Canada	404.34
3rd place, bronze medalist(s)	Víctor Ortega; Juan Guillermo Rios	Colombia	403.23
4	Ivan Garcia; José Ruvalcaba	Mexico	381.18
5	Zachary Cooper; Ryan Hawkins	United States	348.39
