= Diving at the 2013 World Aquatics Championships – Men's synchronized 10 metre platform =

Men's synchronized 10 metre platform at the 2013 World Aquatics Championships
- Dates: 21 July
- Competitors: 28 from 14 nations
- Winning points: 461.46

Medalists
gold medal	Sascha Klein; Patrick Hausding	Germany
silver medal	Victor Minibaev; Artem Chesakov	Russia
bronze medal	Cao Yuan; Zhang Yanquan	China

The men's synchronized 10 metre platform competition at 2013 World Aquatics Championships was held on July 21 with the preliminary round in the morning and the final in the evening session.

== Results ==
The preliminary round was held at 10:00 and the final at 17:30.

Green denotes finalists

Rank	Diver	Nationality	Preliminary		Final	
Rank	Diver	Nationality	Points	Rank	Points	Rank
1st place, gold medalist(s)	Sascha Klein; Patrick Hausding	Germany	433.50	2	461.46	1
2nd place, silver medalist(s)	Victor Minibaev; Artem Chesakov	Russia	409.86	4	445.95	2
3rd place, bronze medalist(s)	Cao Yuan; Zhang Yanquan	China	460.74	1	445.56	3
4	Germán Sánchez; Iván García	Mexico	427.44	3	442.86	4
5	Jeinkler Aguirre; José Guerra	Cuba	403.68	6	434.49	5
6	Oleksandr Gorshkovozov; Dmytro Mezhenskyi	Ukraine	406.59	5	425.52	6
7	Francesco Dell'Uomo; Maicol Verzotto	Italy	376.68	8	386.25	7
8	Kim Yeong-Nam; Woo Ha-Ram	South Korea	390.18	7	386.22	8
9	So Myong-Hyok; Kim Sun-Bom	North Korea	347.28	10	376.56	9
10	Toby Stanley; David Bonuchi	United States	360.75	9	372.84	10
11	Vadim Kaptur; Yauheni Karaliou	Belarus	343.02	11	356.79	11
12	Víctor Ortega; Juan Rios	Colombia	338.85	12	354.30	12
13	Espen Valheim; Daniel Jensen	Norway	336.96	13		
14	Andryan Andryan; Adityo Restu Putra	Indonesia	307.44	14		
