= 2014 FINA Diving World Cup =

International aquatics competition

- Host city: Shanghai, China
- Date: June 15–20, 2014
- Nations: 28
- Website: FINA event site

The 2014 FINA Diving World Cup was held in Shanghai, China, from Tuesday July 15, 2014 to Sunday July 20, 2014. It was the 19th edition of the Diving World Cup, and the sixth time that it had been held in China. The venue was the Outdoor Diving Pool of the Oriental Sports Center.

The Chinese team placed first in all the events, and won the metal count.

== Participating countries ==
The number beside each nation represents the number of athletes who competed for each country at the 2014 FINA Diving World Cup.

- Australia
- Austria
- Belarus
- Brazil
- Canada
- China
- Colombia
- Cuba
- Egypt
- Germany
- Great Britain (8)
- Hong Kong
- Hungary
- Indonesia
- Italy
- Jamaica
- Japan
- Malaysia
- Mexico
- Netherlands
- New Zealand
- North Korea
- Russia
- Singapore
- South Africa
- South Korea
- Ukraine
- United States (12)

== Schedule ==
As reported by FINA.

| Day | Date | Session | Time | Event |
|---|---|---|---|---|
| 0 | 15 July | 1 | 15:15 | Opening Ceremony |
| 0 | 15 July | 1 | 16:00 | Mixed Team Event |
| 1 | 16 July | 1 | 10:00 | Women's 3m Synchro – Prelims |
| 1 | 16 July | 1 | 10:00 | Men's 10m Synchro – Prelims |
| 1 | 16 July | 2 | 15:10 | Women's 3m Synchro – Final |
| 1 | 16 July | 3 | 19:40 | Men's 10m Synchro – Final |
| 2 | 17 July | 1 | 10:00 | Women's 10m Synchro – Prelims |
| 2 | 17 July | 1 | 10:00 | Men's 3m Synchro – Prelims |
| 2 | 17 July | 2 | 15:10 | Women's 10m Synchro – Final |
| 2 | 17 July | 3 | 19:40 | Men's 3m Synchro – Final |
| 3 | 18 July | 1 | 10:00 | Women's 10m Platform – Prelims |
| 3 | 18 July | 1 | 10:00 | Women's 10m Platform – Semi-Final |
| 3 | 18 July | 2 | 14:00 | Men's 3m Springboard – Prelims |
| 3 | 18 July | 2 | 16:15 | Men's 3m Springboard – Semi-Final |
| 3 | 18 July | 3 | 19:40 | Women's 10m Platform – Final |
| 4 | 19 July | 1 | 10:00 | Women's 3m Springboard – Prelims |
| 4 | 19 July | 1 | 10:00 | Women's 3m Springboard – Semi-Final |
| 4 | 19 July | 2 | 18:35 | Men's 3m Springboard – Final |
| 5 | 20 July | 1 | 10:00 | Men's 10m Springboard – Prelims |
| 5 | 20 July | 1 | 10:00 | Men's 10m Platform – Semi-Final |
| 5 | 20 July | 2 | 15:10 | Women's 3m Springboard – Final |
| 5 | 20 July | 3 | 19:40 | Men's 10m Platform – Final |

== Medal summary ==
As reported by FINA.

=== Men's events ===
| Event | Gold | | Silver | | Bronze | |
|---|---|---|---|---|---|---|
| 3 metre springboard | He Chong (CHN) | 540.35 | Cao Yuan (CHN) | 526.70 | Jack Laugher (GBR) | 488.20 |
| 10 metre platform | Yang Jian (CHN) | 543.85 | Qiu Bo (CHN) | 528.50 | Ivan Garcia (MEX) | 504.90 |
| Synchronized; 3 metre springboard | Lin Yue (CHN); Cao Yuan (CHN) | 461.31 | Stephan Feck (GER); Patrick Hausding (GER) | 431.40 | Evgeny Kuznetsov (RUS); Ilya Zakharov (RUS) | 431.34 |
| Synchronized; 10 metre platform | Lin Yue (CHN); Cao Yuan (CHN) | 494.46 | Sascha Klein (GER); Patrick Hausding (GER) | 444.78 | David Boudia (USA); Steele Johnson (USA) | 414.12 |

=== Women's events ===
| Event | Gold | | Silver | | Bronze | |
|---|---|---|---|---|---|---|
| 3 metre springboard | Shi Tingmao (CHN) | 383.40 | He Zi (CHN) | 369.65 | Jennifer Abel (CAN) | 364.05 |
| 10 metre platform | Huang Xiaohui (CHN) | 373.60 | Liu Huixia (CHN) | 354.35 | Melissa Wu (AUS) | 349.50 |
| Synchronized; 3 metre springboard | Wu Minxia (CHN); Shi Tingmao (CHN) | 340.50 | Jennifer Abel (CAN); Pamela Ware (CAN) | 318.33 | Maddison Keeney (AUS); Anabelle Smith (AUS) | 310.14 |
| Synchronized; 10 metre platform | Chen Ruolin (CHN); Liu Huixia (CHN) | 357.66 | Leong Mun Yee (MAS); Cheong Jun Hoong (MAS) | 336.66 | Meaghan Benfeito (CAN); Roseline Filion (CAN) | 335.25 |

=== Team events ===
| Event | Gold | | Silver | | Bronze | |
|---|---|---|---|---|---|---|
| Mixed Team Event | Huang Xiaohui (CHN); Chen Aisen (CHN) | 408.60 | Oleksandr Bondar (UKR); Yulia Prokopchuk (UKR) | 390.55 | Nadezdha Bazhina (RUS); Victor Minibaev (RUS) | 381.30 |

=== Medal table ===
| Rank | Nation | Gold | Silver | Bronze | Total |
|---|---|---|---|---|---|
| 1 | China (CHN) | 9 | 4 | 0 | 13 |
| 2 | Germany (GER) | 0 | 2 | 0 | 2 |
| 3 | Canada (CAN) | 0 | 1 | 2 | 3 |
| 4 | Malaysia (MAS) | 0 | 1 | 0 | 1 |
| 4 | Ukraine (UKR) | 0 | 1 | 0 | 1 |
| 6 | Australia (AUS) | 0 | 0 | 2 | 2 |
| 6 | Russia (RUS) | 0 | 0 | 2 | 2 |
| 8 | Great Britain (GBR) | 0 | 0 | 1 | 1 |
| 8 | Mexico (MEX) | 0 | 0 | 1 | 1 |
| 8 | United States (USA) | 0 | 0 | 1 | 1 |
| Totals (10 entries) | | 9 | 9 | 9 | 27 |

| Preceded by 2012 FINA Diving World Cup (London, UK) | 2014 FINA Diving World Cup (Shanghai, China) | Succeeded by 2016 FINA Diving World Cup (Rio de Janeiro, Brazil) |
