= Cuba at the 2015 World Aquatics Championships =

- Flag of Cuba
- FINA code: CUB
- National federation: Federación Cubaña de Natación

in Kazan, Russia
- Competitors: 13 in 3 sports
- Medals: Gold 0 Silver 0 Bronze 0 Total 0

World Aquatics Championships appearances
- 1973; 1975; 1978; 1982; 1986; 1991; 1994; 1998; 2001; 2003; 2005; 2007; 2009; 2011; 2013; 2015; 2017; 2019; 2022; 2023; 2024

Cuba competed at the 2015 World Aquatics Championships in Kazan, Russia from 24 July to 9 August 2015.

== Diving ==
Cuban divers qualified for the individual spots and synchronized teams at the World Championships.

Men

Athlete	Event	Preliminaries		Semifinals		Final	
Athlete	Event	Points	Rank	Points	Rank	Points	Rank
Arturo Valdés	1 m springboard	283.35	32	—		did not advance	
Arturo Valdés	3 m springboard	290.95	53	did not advance			
Jeinkler Aguirre	10 m platform	393.80	24	did not advance			
Yusmandy Paz	10 m platform	249.00	47	did not advance			
Jeinkler Aguirre; José Guerra	10 m synchronized platform	367.38	15	—		did not advance	

Women

Athlete	Event	Preliminaries		Final	
Athlete	Event	Points	Rank	Points	Rank
Yaima Mena; Annia Rivera	10 m synchronized platform	257.58	14	did not advance	

== Swimming ==
Cuban swimmers have achieved qualifying standards in the following events (up to a maximum of 2 swimmers in each event at the A-standard entry time, and 1 at the B-standard):

Men

Athlete	Event	Heat		Semifinal		Final	
Athlete	Event	Time	Rank	Time	Rank	Time	Rank
Armando Barrera	100 m backstroke	DSQ		did not advance			
Armando Barrera	200 m backstroke	2:00.92	25	did not advance			
Luis Vega	200 m individual medley	2:09.53	44	did not advance			
Luis Vega	400 m individual medley	4:29.57	=36	—		did not advance	

Women

Athlete	Event	Heat		Semifinal		Final	
Athlete	Event	Time	Rank	Time	Rank	Time	Rank
Elisbet Gaméz	100 m freestyle	57.52	49	did not advance			
Elisbet Gaméz	200 m freestyle	2:03.56	46	did not advance			
Elisbet Gaméz	400 m freestyle	4:21.36	36	—		did not advance	

== Synchronized swimming ==
Cuba has qualified two synchronized swimmers to compete in each of the following events.

Athlete	Event	Preliminaries		Final	
Athlete	Event	Points	Rank	Points	Rank
Cristy Alfonso	Solo technical routine	66.8716	23	did not advance	
Cristy Alfonso	Solo free routine	68.3667	26	did not advance	
Cristy Alfonso; Melissa Alonso	Duet technical routine	64.8561	38	did not advance	
Yanela Chacón; Odailys Suárez	Duet free routine	66.0000	=35	did not advance	
