= Germán Sánchez (diver) =

Mexican diver (born 1992)

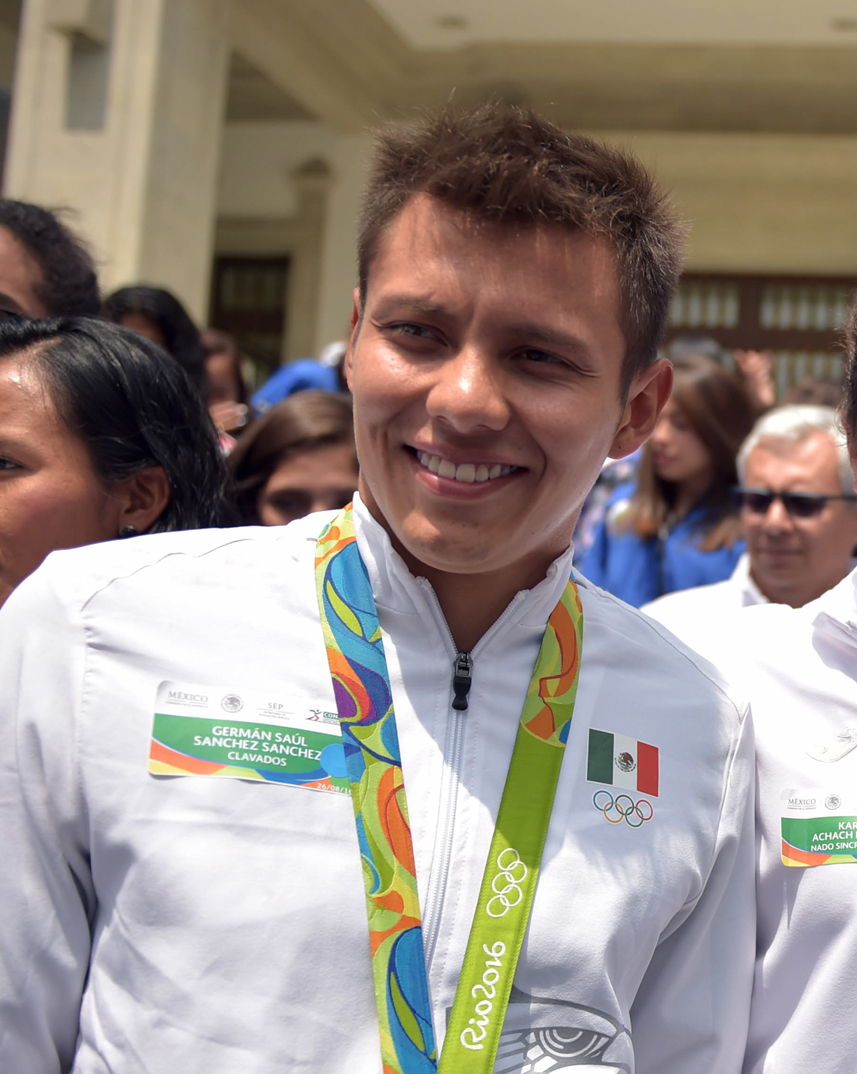
- Germán Sánchez (2016)

Personal information
- Full name: Germán Saúl Sánchez Sánchez
- Nickname: Duva
- Born: 24 June 1992 (age 34) Guadalajara, Mexico
- Height: 167 cm (5 ft 6 in)
- Weight: 50 kg (110 lb)

Sport
- Country: Mexico
- Events: Diving 10 m, 10 m synchro
- Partner: Iván García
Medal record
Men's diving
Representing Mexico
Event	1st	2nd	3rd
Olympic Games	-	2	–
World Championships	-	1	–
World Cup	-	1	-
Pan American Games	1	-	–
Central American and Caribbean Games	2	-	-
Summer Universiade	-	-	2
World Junior Championships	-	1	-
Summer Olympics
Silver medal – second place	2016 Rio de Janeiro	10m platform
Silver medal – second place	2012 London	Sync. platform
World Championships
Silver medal – second place	2015 Kazan	Sync. platform
FINA Diving World Cup
Silver medal – second place	2012 London	Sync. platform
Pan American Games
Gold medal – first place	2011 Guadalajara	Sync. platform
Central American and Caribbean Games
Gold medal – first place	2010 Mayagüez	10m platform
Gold medal – first place	2010 Mayagüez	Sync. platform
Bronze medal – third place	2023 San Salvador	Sync. platform
Summer Universiade
Bronze medal – third place	2013 Kazan	Sync. platform
Bronze medal – third place	2013 Kazan	Team
FINA World Junior Diving Championships
Silver medal – second place	2010 Tucson	10m platform

Germán Saúl Sánchez Sánchez (born 24 June 1992) is a Mexican diver. He is nicknamed "Duva". At the age of 16, he competed in the Men's individual 10m platform at the 2008 Summer Olympics and came in 22nd. He won one gold medal in the 2011 Pan-American Games. At the 2012 Summer Olympics in London, he won a silver medal in the synchronized 10m platform with his partner Iván García. In the individual 10m platform, Sánchez came 14th. In 2016, Sánchez took part in his third Olympic Games in Rio de Janeiro, Brazil, where he came 5th in the synchronized 10m platform, again alongside Iván García. Twelve days later, Sánchez won the silver medal in individual 10m platform. and 9th in the semi-final. He became the third Mexican athlete to win an Olympic silver medal in Men's individual 10m platform after Joaquín Capilla (1952) and Álvaro Gaxiola (1968). He was the only Mexican diver who had won Olympic medals in both individual and synchronized events until Osmar Olvera did it in Paris 2024.

== Technical features ==
Sánchez has performed a series of the most difficult dives since 2012. The dives which he uses now in the competition and their degrees of difficulty are: Forward 4½ Somersaults-Tuck 109C (3.7), Back 3½ Somersaults-Tuck 207C (3.3), Reverse 3½ Somersaults-Tuck 307C (3.4), Inward 4½ Somersaults-Tuck 409C (4.1), Forward 2½ Somersaults 3 Twists-Pike 5156B (3.8) and Armstand Back 3 Somersaults-Tuck 626C (3.3). The total degree of difficulty of his dives is 21.6, which is the world's third greatest following Iván García(MEX) and Yang Jian(CHN). Of his dives, 409C is the most difficult. However, due to the high level of difficulty, he cannot perform the dives perfectly all the time. It is common for him to perform unsteadily.

== Olympic experiences ==
Sánchez took part in his first Olympic Games at the 2008 Beijing Olympic Games at the age of 16. He only participated in the individual 10m platform. The six dives he performed were respectively 5253B, 207C, 307C, 6142D, 407C, and 109C. The total degree of difficulty was only 19.9, which was not enough to be competitive. As a result, he was eliminated after the qualifying round with a score of 399.35 and a final ranking of 22nd.

Games	City	Age	Phase	Unit	DC#	DD	J1	J2	J3	J4	J5	J6	J7	DP	Dive Rank	PTS	Qual.
2008 Summer	Beijing	16	Qualifying	Dive #1	5253B	3.4	7.5	8.0	8.0	7.0	7.5	7.0	7.5	76.50	13T	76.50	
2008 Summer	Beijing	16	Qualifying	Dive #2	207C	3.3	6.0	7.5	6.0	6.5	6.5	7.0	7.0	66.00	25	142.50	
2008 Summer	Beijing	16	Qualifying	Dive #3	307C	3.4	7.0	8.0	6.5	7.0	7.0	7.5	6.5	71.40	15	213.90	
2008 Summer	Beijing	16	Qualifying	Dive #4	6142D	3.1	7.0	7.0	6.0	5.0	6.0	6.5	6.5	58.90	24	272.80	
2008 Summer	Beijing	16	Qualifying	Dive #5	407C	3.2	7.0	8.0	7.0	7.5	7.5	7.0	7.0	68.80	21	341.60	
2008 Summer	Beijing	16	Qualifying	Dive #6	109C	3.5	5.5	4.5	6.0	6.0	5.0	5.5	5.5	57.75	27	399.35	
2008 Summer	Beijing	16	Final Standings												22	399.35	DSQ

Sánchez qualified to participate in both the individual and synchronized 10m platform at the 2012 Summer Olympics with his performance at the 2012 FINA Diving World Cup where he achieved the silver medal alongside Iván García. This time, the dives he performed were much more competitive than those of 2008 Beijing Olympic Games. The six dives they performed in the synchronized 10m platform were 401B, 201B, 109C, 409C, 307C, 5156B. They performed all of their dives almost perfectly, coming in second with a score of 468.90, 17.88 points behind Chinese divers Cao Yuan and Zhang Yanquan.

Games	City	Age	Phase	Unit	DC#	DD	Execution Score						Synchronisation Score					DP	Dive Rank	PTS
Games	City	Age	Phase	Unit	DC#	DD	E1	E2	E3	E4	E5	E6	S1	S2	S3	S4	S5	DP	Dive Rank	PTS
2012 Summer	London	20	Final	Dive #1	401B	2.0	9.0	9.0	9.0	8.5	9.0	9.0	8.5	9.0	8.0	8.0	8.5	51.60	8	51.60
2012 Summer	London	20	Final	Dive #2	201B	2.0	9.0	8.5	8.5	8.0	8.5	8.0	9.0	8.5	8.5	8.0	8.5	50.40	8	102.00
2012 Summer	London	20	Final	Dive #3	109C	3.7	8.5	7.5	7.5	7.5	8.5	7.5	8.5	8.5	8.0	8.0	7.5	87.69	3	189.69
2012 Summer	London	20	Final	Dive #4	409C	4.1	7.5	7.0	7.5	7.0	7.0	7.0	8.5	8.0	8.0	8.0	8.5	95.94	1	285.63
2012 Summer	London	20	Final	Dive #5	307C	3.4	9.0	9.5	9.5	9.0	9.0	8.5	9.5	9.0	9.5	9.5	9.0	92.07	2	377.70
2012 Summer	London	20	Final	Dive #6	5156B	3.8	7.0	7.0	6.5	7.5	8.0	7.0	8.5	8.5	8.5	8.5	8.5	91.20	6	468.90
2012 Summer	London	20	Final Standings																2	468.90

In the individual event, the six dives Sánchez performed were 207C, 5156B, 626C, 409C, 307C, 109C. The total degree of difficulty was 21.5, however due to a poor performance in the dive 626C, he was eliminated after the semi-final, ranked 14th.

Games	City	Age	Phase	Unit	DC#	DD	J1	J2	J3	J4	J5	J6	J7	DP	Dive Rank	PTS	Qual.
2012 Summer	London	20	Qualifying	Dive #1	207C	3.3	9.0	9.0	9.0	9.0	9.0	9.5	9.0	89.10	1	89.10	
2012 Summer	London	20	Qualifying	Dive #2	5156B	3.8	7.0	7.5	6.5	7.0	6.5	7.5	8.0	81.70	9	170.80	
2012 Summer	London	20	Qualifying	Dive #3	626C	3.3	7.5	8.0	6.5	7.0	7.5	8.0	8.0	75.90	17T	246.70	
2012 Summer	London	20	Qualifying	Dive #4	409C	4.1	8.0	8.0	8.0	8.0	7.0	8.0	8.0	98.40	1	345.10	
2012 Summer	London	20	Qualifying	Dive #5	307C	3.4	8.5	8.5	8.5	9.0	8.5	8.5	8.5	84.15	8T	429.25	
2012 Summer	London	20	Qualifying	Dive #6	109C	3.7	6.5	6.0	6.0	6.0	5.5	5.5	6.0	66.60	27T	495.85	
2012 Summer	London	20	Qualifying												5	495.85	Q
2012 Summer	London	20	Semi-Final	Dive #1	207C	3.3	8.5	9.0	9.0	8.5	9.0	8.5	8.5	85.80	5	85.80	
2012 Summer	London	20	Semi-Final	Dive #2	5156B	3.8	8.0	8.0	8.0	8.0	8.0	8.5	8.0	91.20	2	177.00	
2012 Summer	London	20	Semi-Final	Dive #3	626C	3.3	3.5	3.0	4.0	4.0	4.0	3.5	3.5	36.30	18	213.30	
2012 Summer	London	20	Semi-Final	Dive #4	409C	4.1	7.0	7.0	7.0	7.0	7.0	7.0	7.0	86.10	10	299.40	
2012 Summer	London	20	Semi-Final	Dive #5	307C	3.4	9.0	8.0	8.5	9.0	9.0	9.0	9.0	89.10	4T	388.50	
2012 Summer	London	20	Semi-Final	Dive #6	109C	3.7	8.0	8.5	8.0	7.5	8.0	8.5	8.0	88.80	10T	477.30	
2012 Summer	London	20	Semi-Final												14	477.30	DSQ
2012 Summer	London	20	Final Standings												14	477.30	

At the age of 24, Sánchez participated in his third Olympic Games - 2016 Summer Olympics. He was qualified to participate in both individual and synchronized 10m platform with Iván García. In the synchronized 10m platform, their dives were different from those at 2012 Summer Olympics. Their six dives were 401B, 301B, 5255B, 109C, 207C, and 5156B. Without 409C, their total difficult degrees were 18.4, which was still the highest in that competition. They ended up in 5th place, after Chen Aisen/Lin Yue (CHN), David Boudia/Steele Johnson (USA), Thomas Daley/Daniel Goodfellow (GBR), and Patrick Hausding/Sascha Klein (GER).

Games	City	Age	Phase	Unit	DC#	DD	Execution Score						Synchronisation Score					DP	Dive Rank	PTS
Games	City	Age	Phase	Unit	DC#	DD	E1	E2	E3	E4	E5	E6	S1	S2	S3	S4	S5	DP	Dive Rank	PTS
2016 Summer	Rio de Janeiro	24	Final	Dive #1	401B	2.0	8.5	8.5	9.0	8.5	9.0	9.0	9.0	8.5	8.5	8.5	8.5	51.60	=3	51.60
2016 Summer	Rio de Janeiro	24	Final	Dive #2	301B	2.0	8.0	8.5	8.0	8.5	8.0	8.0	8.0	8.5	9.0	8.0	8.5	49.20	5	100.80
2016 Summer	Rio de Janeiro	24	Final	Dive #3	5255B	3.6	7.5	7.5	7.0	7.0	7.5	7.0	8.0	7.5	7.5	7.0	7.5	79.92	3	180.72
2016 Summer	Rio de Janeiro	24	Final	Dive #4	109C	3.7	6.0	6.0	6.0	8.0	8.0	8.0	7.5	7.5	7.5	8.0	8.0	82.14	5	262.86
2016 Summer	Rio de Janeiro	24	Final	Dive #5	207C	3.3	7.5	7.0	7.0	8.0	8.0	8.0	8.0	7.5	8.0	8.0	8.5	77.22	6	340.08
2016 Summer	Rio de Janeiro	24	Final	Dive #6	5156B	3.8	6.5	6.5	5.5	7.0	6.5	6.5	8.0	7.5	7.5	8.0	8.0	83.22	7	423.30
2016 Summer	Rio de Janeiro	24	Final Standings																5	423.30

Twelve days later, Sánchez dived in the final of the individual 10m platform, after ranking only 12th in the preliminary and 9th in the semi-final. Due to injury, he adjusted his dives and the overall degree of difficulty was reduced to 20.7. In contrast to his sub-par performances in the preliminary and semi-final rounds, he performed every dive steadily and won the silver medal with a high score of 532.70.

Games	City	Age	Phase	Unit	DC#	DD	J1	J2	J3	J4	J5	J6	J7	DP	Dive Rank	PTS	Qual.
2016 Summer	Rio de Janeiro	24	Preliminary	Dive #1	207C	3.3	5.5	5.5	5.0	6.0	6.0	6.0	6.0	57.75	25	57.75	
2016 Summer	Rio de Janeiro	24	Preliminary	Dive #2	407C	3.2	6.0	6.5	6.0	5.0	6.0	6.5	6.5	59.20	23	116.95	
2016 Summer1	Rio de Janeiro	24	Preliminary	Dive #3	626C	3.3	8.0	8.0	8.5	8.0	8.0	8.0	8.0	79.20	8	196.15	
2016 Summer	Rio de Janeiro	24	Preliminary	Dive #4	109C	3.7	8.0	8.0	7.5	8.0	7.5	7.0	7.5	85.10	7	281.25	
2016 Summer	Rio de Janeiro	24	Preliminary	Dive #5	307C	3.4	9.0	9.0	9.0	9.0	9.5	9.0	9.0	91.80	=4	373.05	
2016 Summer	Rio de Janeiro	24	Preliminary	Dive #6	5156B	3.8	5.5	4.5	5.0	5.0	5.5	4.5	5.0	57.00	22	430.05	
2016 Summer	Rio de Janeiro	24	Preliminary												12	430.05	Q
2016 Summer	Rio de Janeiro	24	Semi-Final	Dive #1	207C	3.3	9.0	8.5	8.0	8.5	8.5	8.5	9.0	84.15	5	84.15	
2016 Summer	Rio de Janeiro	24	Semi-Final	Dive #2	407C	3.2	6.5	6.5	6.5	7.0	7.5	7.5	7.5	67.20	=15	151.35	
2016 Summer	Rio de Janeiro	24	Semi-Final	Dive #3	626C	3.3	6.0	5.5	6.5	6.0	7.0	6.5	6.5	62.70	14	214.05	
2016 Summer	Rio de Janeiro	24	Semi-Final	Dive #4	109C	3.7	7.0	7.0	6.0	6.5	7.0	7.0	7.0	77.70	12	291.75	
2016 Summer	Rio de Janeiro	24	Semi-Final	Dive #5	307C	3.4	8.5	8.5	8.5	8.5	8.5	8.5	9.0	86.70	3	378.45	
2016 Summer	Rio de Janeiro	24	Semi-Final	Dive #6	5156B	3.8	7.5	7.5	7.5	7.0	7.5	7.0	7.0	83.60	8	462.05	
2016 Summer	Rio de Janeiro	24	Semi-Final												9	462.05	Q
2016 Summer	Rio de Janeiro	24	Final	Dive #1	207C	3.3	8.5	8.0	8.0	8.5	8.5	8.5	8.5	84.15	6	84.15	
2016 Summer	Rio de Janeiro	24	Final	Dive #2	407C	3.2	8.5	9.0	8.0	9.0	8.5	8.5	8.5	81.60	=6	165.75	
2016 Summer	Rio de Janeiro	24	Final	Dive #3	626C	3.3	8.0	8.0	9.0	9.0	8.5	8.0	8.5	82.50	7	248.25	
2016 Summer	Rio de Janeiro	24	Final	Dive #4	109C	3.7	8.5	9.0	9.0	9.0	8.5	8.5	9.0	98.05	2	346.30	
2016 Summer	Rio de Janeiro	24	Final	Dive #5	307C	3.4	9.5	9.5	9.0	9.0	9.0	9.5	9.5	95.20	3	441.50	
2016 Summer	Rio de Janeiro	24	Final	Dive #6	5156B	3.8	7.5	8.0	8.0	8.0	8.0	7.5	8.5	91.20	4	532.70	
2016 Summer	Rio de Janeiro	24	Final												2	532.70	
2016 Summer	Rio de Janeiro	24	Final Standings												2	532.70	

== Competitive history ==
Sánchez became a professional diver at the 2008 Summer Olympics in Beijing. From then on, he has been representing Mexico FINA World Junior Diving Championships, FINA World Aquatics Championships, Olympic Games, FINA Diving World Cup, FINA Diving World Series, Pan American Games and Central American and Caribbean Games. He has won many medals from these competitions since 2010. He has won one gold medal in the Pan American Games in 2011, as well as Olympic silver medals in London 2012 (synchronized) and Rio 2016 (individual).

Competition	2008	2009	2010	2011	2012	2013	2014	2015	2016
Olympic Games, 10 m	22nd				14th				2nd
Olympic Games, 10 m (synchro)					2nd^{@}				5th^{@}
Pan American Games, 10 m (synchro)				1st^{@}					
Central American and Caribbean Games, 10 m			1st						
Central American and Caribbean Games, 10 m (synchro)			1st^{@}						
Summer Universiade, 10 m						4th			
Summer Universiade, 10 m (synchro)						3rd^{@}			
Summer Universiade, team (men)						3rd			
FINA World Championships, 10 m						4th			
FINA World Championships, 10 m (synchro)		8th^{@}		7th^{@}		4th^{@}		2nd^{@}	
FINA World Junior Diving Championships, Group A, 10 m	16th		2nd						
FINA Diving World Cup, 10 m	16th		16th		10th		6th		13th
FINA Diving World Cup, 10 m (synchro)			7th^{@}		2nd^{@}		5th^{@}		12th^{@}
FINA Diving World Series, Overall Ranking, 10 m			2nd		11th	7th	13th	4th	
FINA Diving World Series, Overall Ranking, 10 m (synchro)			4th^{@}	3rd^{@}	7th^{@}	3rd^{@}	3rd^{@}	3rd^{@}	7th^{@}
FINA Diving World Series, Overall Ranking, 10 m (mixed synchro)^{%}								3rd^{#}	
FINA Diving Grand Prix, Overall Ranking, 10 m (synchro)^{%}				3rd^{@}	2nd^{@}				
FINA Diving World Series, Qingdao, China, 10 m			6th						
FINA Diving World Series, Qingdao, China, 10 m (synchro)			4th^{@}						
FINA Diving World Series, Beijing, China, 10 m								5th	
FINA Diving World Series, Beijing, China, 10 m (synchro)				4th^{@}	5th^{@}			3rd^{@}	
FINA Diving World Series, Dubai, UAE, 10 m								8th	
FINA Diving World Series, Dubai, UAE, 10 m (synchro)					7th^{@}			2nd^{@}	
FINA Diving World Series, Moscow, RUS, 10 m							7th		
FINA Diving World Series, Moscow, RUS, 10 m (synchro)							1st^{@}		
FINA Diving World Series, Kazan, RUS, 10 m								2nd	
FINA Diving World Series, Kazan, RUS, 10 m (synchro)								2nd^{@}	6th^{@}
FINA Diving World Series, Sheiffield, GBR, 10 m (synchro)				4th^{@}					
FINA Diving World Series, Edinburgh, GBR, 10 m (synchro)						3rd^{@}			
FINA Diving World Series, London, GBR, 10 m							13th	5th	
FINA Diving World Series, London, GBR, 10 m (synchro)							4th^{@}	3rd^{@}	
FINA Diving World Series, Veracruz, MEX, 10 m			5th						
FINA Diving World Series, Veracruz, MEX, 10 m (synchro)			5th^{@}						
FINA Diving World Series, Veracruz, MEX, 3 m (synchro)			2nd^{*}						
FINA Diving World Series, Veracruz, MEX, 10 m ^{§}			3rd						
FINA Diving World Series, Veracruz, MEX, 10 m (synchro)^{§}			5th						
FINA Diving World Series, Guanajuato, MEX, 10 m (synchro)				1st^{@}					
FINA Diving World Series, Tijuana, MEX, 10 m	7th				4th				
FINA Diving World Series, Tijuana, MEX, 10 m (synchro)	7th^{@}				2nd^{@}				
FINA Diving World Series, Guadalajara, MEX, 10 m						3rd			
FINA Diving World Series, Guadalajara, MEX, 10 m (synchro)						1st^{@}			
FINA Diving World Series, Guadalajara, MEX, 10 m^{†}						2nd			
FINA Diving World Series, Guadalajara, MEX, 10 m (synchro)^{†}						1st^{@}			
FINA Diving World Series, Monterrey, MEX, 10 m							7th		
FINA Diving World Series, Monterrey, MEX, 10 m (synchro)							2nd^{@}		
FINA Diving World Series, Mérida, MEX, 10 m								6th	
FINA Diving World Series, Mérida, MEX, 10 m (synchro)								1st^{@}	
FINA Diving World Series, Windsor, CAN, 10 m							7th	5th	
FINA Diving World Series, Windsor, CAN, 10 m (synchro)							3rd^{@}	5th^{@}	
FINA Diving World Series, Windsor, CAN, 10 m (mixed synchro)								3rd^{#}	

^{@}with Iván García
^{#}with Alejandra Orozco

^{*}with Alejandro Islas Arroyo
^{§}Veracruz, MEX held two legs of 2010 FINA Diving World Series.
^{†} Guadalajara, MEX held two legs of 2013 FINA Diving World Series.
^{%} With different pairs.
