= Diving at the 2019 Pan American Games – Qualification =

This article details the qualifying phase for diving at the 2019 Pan American Games. The competition at these Games comprised a total of 70 athletes coming from 12 different nations; each was allowed to enter no more than 8 divers if entering teams into the synchronized diving events, or 6 divers if not. A maximum of two divers per event per NOC was enforced, and divers were allowed to enter into multiple events.

== Summary ==
The top twenty divers from the South American Swimming Championships along with the top twenty from the Central American and Caribbean Games and the Central American and Caribbean Swimming Championships combined qualified, with the remaining 14 places from Zone 1 and 2 being made up according to FINA rankings. Eight divers also qualified from Zones 3 and 4 (USA and Canada respectively) according to National Championships or trials held by the country.

Please note: Athletes could enter multiple events and therefore the numbers below are the number of entries each NOC made, not the number of athletes participating.

'X' indicates a team of 2 divers

Nation	Synchronized diving				Individual diving						Total entries
Nation	Men's 3 m	Men's 10 m	Women's 3 m	Women's 10 m	Men's 1 m	Men's 3 m	Men's 10 m	Women's 1 m	Women's 3 m	Women's 10 m	Total entries
Brazil	X	X	X		2	2	2	2	2	2	18
Canada	X	X	X	X		2	2		2	2	16
Chile	X				2	2		2	2		10
Colombia	X	X	X		1	2	2	2	2	2	17
Cuba	X	X	X	X	2	2	2	2	2	2	20
Dominican Republic	X	X			1	2	2				9
Jamaica					1	1					2
Mexico	X	X	X	X	2	2	2	2	2	2	20
Peru	X		X		1	1		1	1		8
Puerto Rico					1	1	1				3
United States	X	X	X	X	2	2	2	2	2	2	20
Venezuela		X					2	1	1	2	8
Total: 12 NOCs	18	16	14	8	15	19	17	14	16	14	151

Panam Sports final list - 1 August 2019

== Timeline ==
Event	Date	Venue
2018 Central American and Caribbean Games	July 19–25, 2018	(Colombia) Barranquilla
2018 South American Swimming Championships	November 7–10, 2018	(Peru) Trujillo
2019 Central American and Caribbean Swimming Championships	March 28–31, 2019	(Cuba) Havana
Re-allocation of unused quota	June 15–26, 2019	—
