= Diving at the 2012 Summer Olympics – Men's synchronized 10 metre platform =

Men's synchronised 10 metre platform at the Games of the XXX Olympiad
- Venue: Aquatics Centre
- Date: 30 July
- Competitors: 16 from 8 nations

Medalists
1st place, gold medalist(s)		Cao Yuan; Zhang Yanquan	China
2nd place, silver medalist(s)		Iván García; Germán Sánchez	Mexico
3rd place, bronze medalist(s)		David Boudia; Nicholas McCrory	United States

The men's synchronised 10 metre platform diving competition at the 2012 Olympic Games in London took place on 30 July at the Aquatics Centre within the Olympic Park.

The Chinese team of Cao Yuan and Zhang Yanquan won the gold medal.

== Format ==
A single round was held, with each team making six dives. Eleven judges scored each dive: three for each diver, and five for synchronisation. Only the middle score counted for each diver, with the middle three counting for synchronisation. These five scores were averaged, multiplied by 3, and multiplied by the dive's degree of difficulty to give a total dive score. The scores for each of the five dives were summed to give a final score.

== Schedule ==
Times are British Summer Time (UTC+1)

Date	Time	Round
Monday 30 July 2012	15:00	Final

== Results ==
Rank	Nation	Dives						Total
Rank	Nation	1	2	3	4	5	6	Total
1st place, gold medalist(s)	China; Cao Yuan; Zhang Yanquan	56.40	55.80	89.28	93.06	92.88	99.36	486.78
2nd place, silver medalist(s)	Mexico; Iván García; Germán Sánchez	51.60	50.40	87.69	95.94	92.07	91.20	468.90
3rd place, bronze medalist(s)	United States; David Boudia; Nicholas McCrory	54.60	54.00	82.56	92.13	85.14	95.04	463.47
4	Great Britain; Tom Daley; Peter Waterfield	56.40	56.40	91.08	71.28	87.69	91.80	454.65
5	Cuba; Jeinkler Aguirre; José Guerra	54.00	51.60	81.60	80.64	89.10	93.96	450.90
6	Russia; Ilya Zakharov; Victor Minibaev	52.20	52.80	84.48	84.15	88.56	87.69	449.88
7	Germany; Patrick Hausding; Sascha Klein	52.80	54.00	84.48	78.84	84.15	91.80	446.07
8	Ukraine; Oleksandr Gorshkovozov; Oleksandr Bondar	52.20	51.00	83.16	75.60	82.56	88.80	433.32
