= Qiu Bo =

Chinese diver (born 1993)

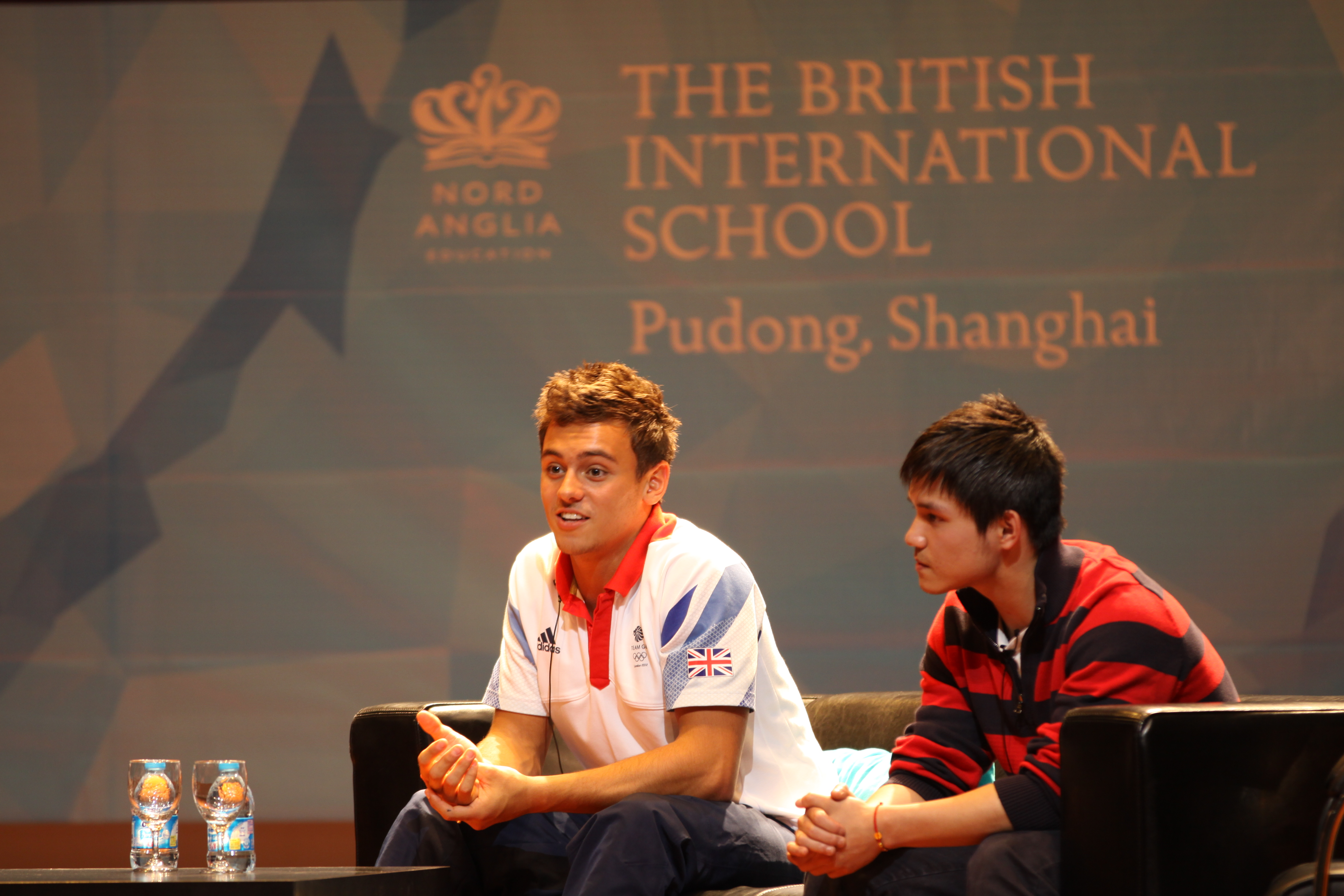

Personal information
- Nationality: Chinese
- Born: 31 January 1993 (age 33) Neijiang, Sichuan
- Height: 166 cm (5 ft 5 in)
- Weight: 59 kg (130 lb; 9.3 st)

Sport
- Country: China
- Sport: Diving
- Event(s): 10 m, 10 m synchro
- Club: Sichuan
- Partner: Yang Jian
Medal record
Event	1st	2nd	3rd
Olympic Games	–	1	–
World Championships	4	1	–
FINA Diving World Cup	3	1	1
Asian Games	1	1	–
Youth Olympic Games	2	–	–
Olympic Games
Silver medal – second place	2012 London	10m platform
World Championships
Gold medal – first place	2011 Shanghai	10m platform
Gold medal – first place	2011 Shanghai	10m synchro
Gold medal – first place	2013 Barcelona	10m platform
Gold medal – first place	2015 Kazan	10m platform
Silver medal – second place	2009 Rome	10m platform
FINA Diving World Cup
Gold medal – first place	2012 London	10m platform
Gold medal – first place	2016 Rio de Janeiro	10m platform
Gold medal – first place	2018 Wuhan	Team event
Silver medal – second place	2014 Shanghai	10m platform
Bronze medal – third place	2010 Changzhou	10m platform
Asian Games
Gold medal – first place	2014 Incheon	10m platform
Silver medal – second place	2018 Jakarta	10m platform
Youth Olympic Games
Gold medal – first place	2010 Singapore	3m springboard
Gold medal – first place	2010 Singapore	10m platform

Qiu Bo (Chinese: 邱波; pinyin: Qiū Bō; born 31 January 1993) is a Chinese diver. He won the silver medal in the 10 metre platform event at the 2012 Summer Olympics. He is a four-time world champion at the World Aquatics Championships, winning the gold medal three times in the 10m platform event, consecutively in 2011, 2013 and 2015, and winning the gold medal in the synchronized 10m event in 2011.

== Early life ==
Born in Neijiang, Sichuan, Qiu started diving at the age of 7. His diving career began when a coach spotted him bouncing on a trampoline and drafted him into a state sports school. In 2002, Qiu considered quitting the sport when his family could no longer afford his schooling. His coach convinced him to continue and used his own money to finance Qiu's development.

== Diving career ==
Qiu is part of the China National Diving Team since 2008. During the 2010 Summer Youth Olympics, he won a pair of gold medals in both the 3m springboard and 10m platform competitions. In the 2011 FINA Diving World Series, Qiu achieved his career high with a historic score of 609.20 in the 10m platform event, where he received 25 perfect 10s from the judges. He also became the first diver in history to surpass 600 points in an international competition since the regulation was introduced. Later that year, FINA named Qiu as the Male Diver of the Year. In the 2015 FINA Diving World Series, Qiu broke his previous record and achieved a new personal best with a score of 612.75.

=== Olympic Games ===
Qiu competed in the 2012 Summer Olympics and received a silver medal in the 10 metre platform competition. Despite ranking first in the preliminary round and the semifinals, he ultimately placed second behind American diver David Boudia during the finals. His final score of 566.85 was just 1.8 points behind Boudia's 568.65.

Four years later, Qiu competed in the 2016 Summer Olympics in the 10 metre platform competition. Despite ranking second in the preliminary round and the semifinals, he had misses in two of his dives and ultimately placed sixth behind Chinese diver Chen Aisen in the finals. Qiu accumulated a final score of 488.20, including a third dive that received 10s from all seven judges.

=== World Championships ===
Qiu rose to prominence during the 2009 World Aquatics Championships, where he won a silver medal in the 10 metre platform event. In 2011, he won gold medals in both the 10m individual event and the 10m synchro event with his partner Huo Liang. In 2013, Qiu continued his victorious streak by winning another gold medal in the 10m platform competition. Two years later, he repeated his success and won his third consecutive gold medal during the 2015 World Aquatics Championships. Qiu and American diver Greg Louganis are the only men to win the world championship title at this event for three successive times. In 2017, Qiu only participated in the mixed team event, where he came in sixth place.

=== Diving World Cup ===
Qiu competed in the 10m platform event at the FINA Diving World Cup on four occasions, achieving a podium finish every time. He won a gold medal in the years 2012 and 2016. He also won a silver medal in 2014, along with a bronze medal in 2010.

In 2018, Qiu competed in the mixed team event, where he won the gold medal with Chen Yiwen.

== Competitive history ==
2009
Competition	Event	Score	Rank
FINA Diving World Series - Doha	Men 10m platform final	544.90	3rd
FINA Diving World Series - Changzhou	Men 10m platform final	542.25	2nd
FINA Diving World Series - Sheffield	Men 10m platform final	540.50	3rd
FINA Diving World Series - Mexico City	Men 10m platform semifinal B	482.95	3rd
13th World Aquatics Championships	Men 10m platform final	532.20	2nd

2010
Competition	Event	Score	Rank
FINA Diving World Series - Qingdao	Men 10m platform final	588.20	1st
FINA Diving World Series - Veracruz #1	Men 10m platform final	557.60	1st
FINA Diving World Series - Veracruz #2	Men 10m platform final	584.25	1st
17th FINA Diving World Cup	Men 10m platform final	554.70	3rd

2011
Competition	Event	Score	Rank
FINA Diving World Series - Moscow	Men 10m platform final	607.60	1st
FINA Diving World Series - Beijing	Men 10m platform final	609.20	1st
FINA Diving World Series - Sheffield	Men 10m platform final	586.55	1st
FINA Diving World Series - Guanajuato	Men 10m platform final	582.45	1st
14th World Aquatics Championships	Men 10m platform final	585.45	1st
14th World Aquatics Championships	Men 10m synchro final	480.03	1st

2012
Competition	Event	Score	Rank
18th FINA Diving World Cup	Men 10m platform final	574.90	1st
FINA Diving World Series - Dubai	Men 10m platform final	569.25	1st
FINA Diving World Series - Beijing	Men 10m platform final	566.50	1st
2012 Summer Olympics	Men 10m platform final	566.85	2nd

2013
Competition	Event	Score	Rank
FINA Diving World Series - Guadalajara #1	Men 10m platform final	550.40	1st
FINA Diving World Series - Guadalajara #2	Men 10m platform final	572.20	1st
15th World Aquatics Championships	Men 10m platform final	581.00	1st

2014
Competition	Event	Score	Rank
FINA Diving World Series - Beijing	Men 10m platform final	534.05	2nd
FINA Diving World Series - Dubai	Men 10m platform final	530.90	2nd
FINA Diving World Series - Windsor	Men 10m platform final	557.80	2nd
FINA Diving World Series - Monterrey	Men 10m platform final	583.95	1st
19th FINA Diving World Cup	Men 10m platform final	528.50	2nd
17th Asian Games	Men 10m platform final	576.40	1st

2015
Competition	Event	Score	Rank
FINA Diving World Series - Beijing	Men 10m platform final	522.20	4th
FINA Diving World Series - Dubai	Men 10m platform final	612.75	1st
FINA Diving World Series - Kazan	Men 10m platform final	573.05	1st
FINA Diving World Series - London	Men 10m platform final	506.60	3rd
16th World Aquatics Championships	Men 10m platform final	587.00	1st

2016
Competition	Event	Score	Rank
20th FINA Diving World Cup	Men 10m platform final	557.75	1st
FINA Diving World Series - Beijing	Men 10m platform final	564.40	2nd
FINA Diving World Series - Windsor	Men 10m platform final	571.25	2nd
FINA Diving World Series - Kazan	Men 10m platform final	554.00	3rd
2016 Summer Olympics	Men 10m platform final	488.20	6th

2017
Competition	Event	Score	Rank
17th World Aquatics Championships	Mixed 3m & 10m team final	355.15	6th

2018
Competition	Event	Score	Rank
FINA Diving World Series - Montreal	Men 10m platform final	568.15	1st
FINA Diving World Series - Montreal	Men 10m synchro final	472.11	1st
21st FINA Diving World Cup	Mixed 3m & 10m team final	406.20	1st
18th Asian Games	Men 10m platform final	566.60	2nd

Awards
Preceded by (Germany) Patrick Hausding	FINA Male Diver of the Year; 2011	Succeeded by (Russia) Ilya Zakharov
