= Diving at the 2014 South American Games – Men's 10 metre platform =

Men's 10 metre platform at the 2014 South American Games
- Venue: Aquatic Center National Stadium
- Dates: March 16 (final)
- Competitors: 8 from 5 nations
- Winning score: 489.95

Medalists
gold medal	Hugo Parisi (BRA)
silver medal	Juan Ríos Lopera (COL)
bronze medal	Víctor Ortega (COL)

The men's 10 metre platform diving competition at the 2014 South American Games in Santiago was held on 16 March at the Aquatic Center National Stadium.

== Schedule ==
All times are Chile Summer Time (UTC−03:00)

Date	Time	Event
16 March	13:00	Final

== Results ==
Rank	Athlete	Dive						Total
Rank	Athlete	1	2	3	4	5	6	Total
1st place, gold medalist(s)	Hugo Parisi (BRA)	81.00	86.40	80.85	90.00	76.50	75.20	489.95
2nd place, silver medalist(s)	Juan Ríos Lopera (COL)	75.60	85.80	75.00	73.10	57.60	69.30	436.40
3rd place, bronze medalist(s)	Víctor Ortega (COL)	76.50	52.80	62.40	85.80	78.20	70.40	426.10
4	Robert Páez (VEN)	63.55	67.20	61.50	73.60	66.30	84.15	416.30
5	Rui Marinho (BRA)	72.00	73.60	80.85	56.10	72.00	46.40	400.95
6	Vladimir Badilla (CHI)	39.90	43.20	57.00	75.20	63.80	33.30	312.40
7	Jonathan Posligua (ECU)	21.00	50.75	29.40	57.50	59.45	54.00	272.10
8	Walter Vera (ECU)	36.00	40.60	49.30	26.60	36.80	36.40	225.70
