= 2012 FINA Diving World Cup =

International diving competition

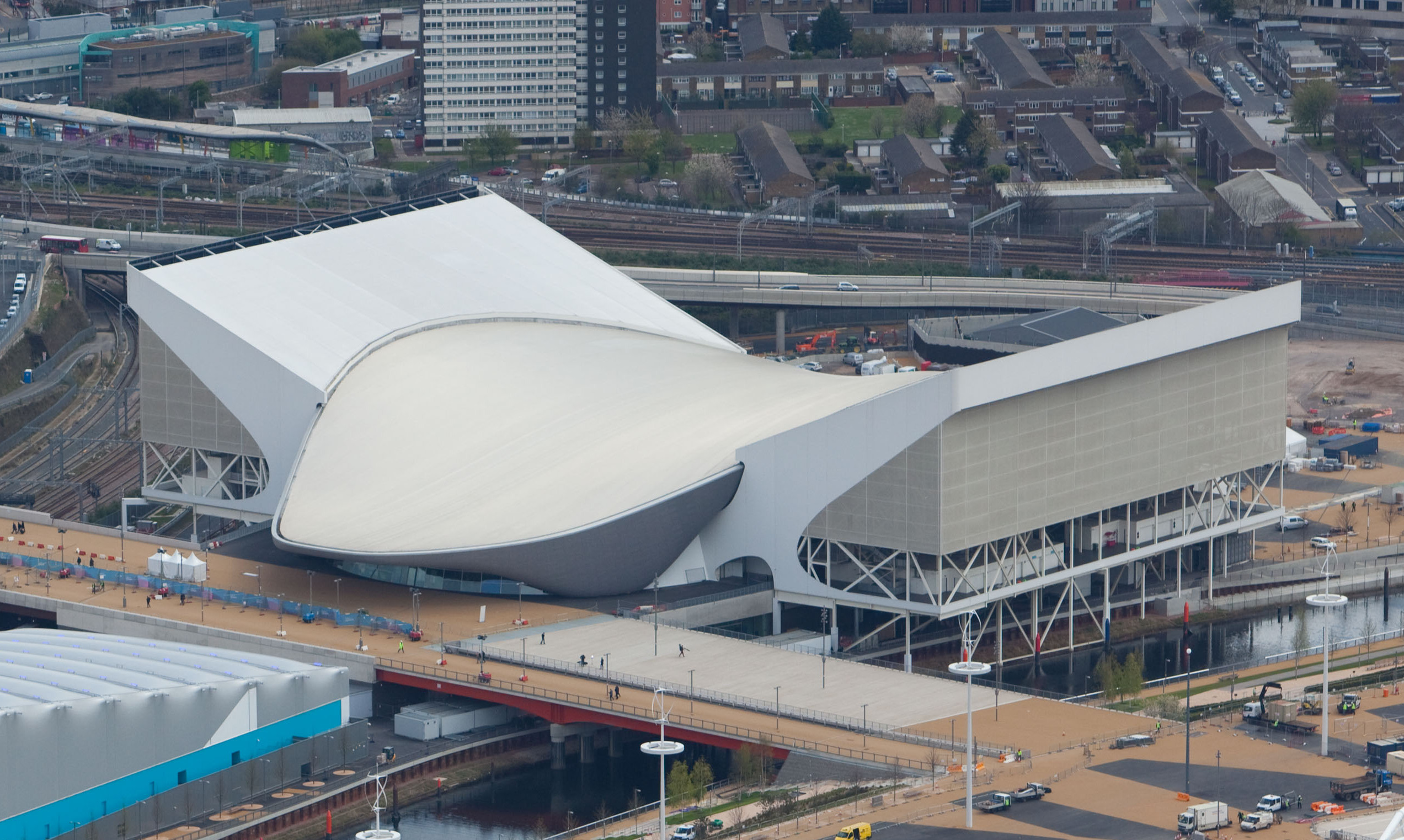
- Host city: London, United Kingdom
- Date: February 20–26, 2012
- Venue: London Aquatics Centre
- Nations: 28
- Website: FINA event site

The 2012 FINA Diving World Cup took place in London, United Kingdom, from Monday February 20, 2012 to Sunday February 26, 2012.

The 2012 Fina World Diving Cup was the first event for the London Aquatics Centre, a test event part of the London Prepares series of test events and also served as a qualifying event for nations to attend the 2012 Olympic Games.

== Medal summary ==
=== Medal table ===
Rank	Nation	Gold	Silver	Bronze	Total
1	China (CHN)	8	3	0	11
2	Canada (CAN)	0	2	1	3
2	Russia (RUS)	0	2	1	3
4	Mexico (MEX)	0	1	0	1
5	Great Britain (GBR)	0	0	2	2
5	Italy (ITA)	0	0	2	2
7	Germany (GER)	0	0	1	1
7	Malaysia (MAS)	0	0	1	1
Totals (8 entries)		8	8	8	24

=== Men's events ===
Event	Gold		Silver		Bronze	
3 metre springboard	He Chong (CHN)	553.35	Qin Kai (CHN)	524.00	Alexandre Despatie (CAN)	511.95
10 metre platform	Qiu Bo (CHN)	574.90	Victor Minibaev (RUS)	523.60	Peter Waterfield (GBR)	510.35
Synchronized; 3 metre springboard	Qin Kai (CHN); Luo Yutong (CHN)	445.71	Evgeny Kuznetsov (RUS); Ilya Zakharov (RUS)	439.83	Bryan Nickson Lomas (MAS); Huang Qiang (MAS)	432.09
Synchronized; 10 metre platform	Cao Yuan (CHN); Zhang Yanquan (CHN)	481.29	Iván García (MEX); Germán Sánchez (MEX)	460.17	Sascha Klein (GER); Patrick Hausding (GER)	457.41

=== Women's events ===
Event	Gold		Silver		Bronze	
3 metre springboard	Wu Minxia (CHN)	368.95	He Zi (CHN)	365.40	Tania Cagnotto (ITA)	345.75
10 metre platform	Chen Ruolin (CHN)	405.25	Hu Yadan (CHN)	397.10	Yulia Koltunova (RUS)	350.25
Synchronized; 3 metre springboard	He Zi (CHN); Wu Minxia (CHN)	345.30	Jennifer Abel (CAN); Émilie Heymans (CAN)	321.90	Tania Cagnotto (ITA); Francesca Dallapè (ITA)	317.40
Synchronized; 10 metre platform	Chen Ruolin (CHN); Wang Hao (CHN)	359.58	Meaghan Benfeito (CAN); Roseline Filion (CAN)	331.65	Sarah Barrow (GBR); Tonia Couch (GBR)	314.40

Preceded by 2010 FINA Diving World Cup (Changzhou, China)	2012 FINA Diving World Cup (London, U.K.)	Succeeded by 2014 FINA Diving World Cup (Shanghai, China)
