= Diving at the 2010 Central American and Caribbean Games =

Competition held in Mayagüez, Puerto Rico

- Venue: Natatorio RUM
- Location: Mayagüez
- Dates: 19-24 July

The Diving competition at the 2010 Central American and Caribbean Games was being held in Mayagüez, Puerto Rico.

The tournament was scheduled to be held from 19–24 July at the Natatorio RUM in Mayagüez.

== Medal summary ==
=== Men's events ===
Event	Gold		Silver		Bronze	
1m Springboard	Alejandro Daniel Islas; Mexico	390.15	Yahel Castillo; Mexico	388.05	Emilio Colmenares; Venezuela	363.95
3m Springboard	Yahel Castillo; Mexico	467.30	Sebastian Villa; Colombia	438.00	Alejandro Daniel Islas; Mexico	424.75
10m Platform	Germán Sánchez; Mexico	474.15	Rommel Pacheco; Mexico	470.95	Sebastian Villa; Colombia	410.90
3m Synchronised Springboard	Mexico; Alberto Argote; Yahel Castillo	408.66	Venezuela; Emilio Colmenares; José Sánchez	378.30	Colombia; Andrés Guerra; Sebastián Villa	362.79
10m Synchronised Platform	Mexico; Iván García; Germán Sánchez	450.03	Venezuela; Erickson Contreras; Walter Rojas	397.26	Colombia; Andrés Guerra; Sebastián Villa	396.48

=== Women's events ===
Event	Gold		Silver		Bronze	
1m Springboard	Paola Espinosa; Mexico	286.10	Arantxa Chávez; Mexico	266.35	Luisa Jiménez; Puerto Rico	245.90
3m Springboard	Paola Espinosa; Mexico	312.10	Arantxa Chávez; Mexico	279.85	Jocelyn Castillo; Venezuela	273.30
10m Platform	Paola Espinosa; Mexico	373.60	Karla Rivas; Mexico	311.85	Lisette Ramirez; Venezuela	237.20
