= Diving at the 2018 Central American and Caribbean Games =

- Venue: Complejo Acuático
- Location: (Colombia) Barranquilla
- Dates: 19–25 July

The diving competition at the 2018 Central American and Caribbean Games was held in Barranquilla, Colombia from 19 to 25 July at the Complejo Acuático.

== Medal summary ==
=== Men's events ===
Event	Gold		Silver		Bronze	
1 m springboard	Jahir Ocampo (MEX)	414.45	Sebastián Morales (COL)	401.45	Rommel Pacheco (MEX)	383.25
3 m springboard	Rommel Pacheco (MEX)	473.30	Sebastián Morales (COL)	451.80	Alejandro Arias (COL)	412.70
10 m platform	Iván García (MEX)	452.00	Andrés Villarreal (MEX)	414.80	Sebastián Villa (COL)	411.85
3 m synchronized springboard	Mexico (MEX); Rommel Pacheco; Jahir Ocampo	429.51	Colombia (COL); Alejandro Arias; Sebastián Morales	375.33	Dominican Republic (DOM); Frandiel Gómez; José Calderón	327.60
10 m synchronized platform	Mexico (MEX); Iván García; Andrés Villarreal	411.90	Cuba (CUB); Yusmandy Paz; Jeinkler Aguirre	366.57	Colombia (COL); Sebastián Villa; Kevin García	318.00

=== Women's events ===
Event	Gold		Silver		Bronze	
1 m springboard	Diana Pineda (COL)	282.75	Paola Espinosa (MEX)	277.35	Carolina Mendoza (MEX)	260.30
3 m springboard	Carolina Mendoza (MEX)	321.60	Paola Espinosa (MEX)	300.20	Diana Pineda (COL)	294.85
10 m platform	Anisley García (CUB)	332.90	Viviana del Ángel (MEX)	332.45	Gabriela Agúndez (MEX)	330.45

== Medal table ==
* Host nation (Colombia)

Rank	Nation	Gold	Silver	Bronze	Total
1	Mexico (MEX)	6	4	3	13
2	Colombia (COL)*	1	3	4	8
3	Cuba (CUB)	1	1	0	2
4	Dominican Republic (DOM)	0	0	1	1
Totals (4 entries)		8	8	8	24
