= Iván García (diver) =

Mexican diver (born 1993)

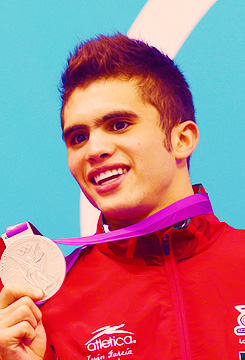

Personal information
- Full name: Iván Alejandro García Navarro
- Nickname: Pollo
- Born: 25 October 1993 (age 32) Guadalajara, Mexico
- Home town: Guadalajara
- Height: 165 cm (5 ft 5 in)
- Weight: 47 kg (104 lb)
- Spouse: Paola Espinosa

Sport
- Country: Mexico
- Events: Diving 10 m, 10 m synchro
- Club: Jalisco
- Partner: Kevin Berlín
- Former partner: Germán Sánchez
Medal record
Men's diving
Representing Mexico
Event	1st	2nd	3rd
Olympic Games	-	1	-
World Championships	-	1	–
World Cup	-	2	1
Pan American Games	4	1	–
Central American and Caribbean Games	4	-	-
Youth Olympic Games	-	-	1
Summer Universiade	-	-	2
Summer Olympics
Silver medal – second place	2012 London	10 m synchro
World Championships
Silver medal – second place	2015 Kazan	10 m synchro
FINA Diving World Cup
Silver medal – second place	2012 London	10 m synchro
Silver medal – second place	2020 Tokyo	10 m synchro
Bronze medal – third place	2014 Shanghai	10 m platform
Pan American Games
Gold medal – first place	2011 Guadalajara	10 m platform
Gold medal – first place	2011 Guadalajara	10 m synchro
Gold medal – first place	2015 Toronto	10 m platform
Gold medal – first place	2019 Lima	10 m synchro
Silver medal – second place	2019 Lima	10 m platform
Central American and Caribbean Games
Gold medal – first place	2010 Mayagüez	10 m synchro
Gold medal – first place	2014 Veracruz	10 m platform
Gold medal – first place	2018 Barranquilla	10 m platform
Gold medal – first place	2018 Barranquilla	10 m synchro
Youth Olympic Games
Bronze medal – third place	2010 Singapore	10 m platform
Summer Universiade
Bronze medal – third place	2013 Kazan	10 m synchro
Bronze medal – third place	2013 Kazan	Team

Iván Alejandro García Navarro (born 25 October 1993) is a Mexican diver. He is nicknamed "Pollo" ("Chicken"). He competes in diving and represented Mexico at the 2012 Summer Olympics in London. He won a silver medal in the 10m Synchronized Platform with his partner Germán Sánchez with a high score of 468.90. In the individual 10m Platform, García came the 7th with a score of 521.65.

He won two gold medals in both the individual and synchronized 10m Platform in the 2011 Pan-American Games. At the 2012 Summer Olympics in London García won the silver medal in the synchronized 10 metre platform diving, with his partner Germán Sánchez. At the 2015 Pan American Games, he retained the gold medal in the individual 10m platform back to back. In Rio 2016 he finished 10th on the individual platform.

== Technical Features ==
Iván García can perform the most difficult dives all over the world. He has mastered a series of the most difficult dives since 2012. The dives which he uses now in the competition and their difficult degrees are respectively Forward 4 1/2 Somersaults-Tuck 109C(3.7), Back 3 1/2 Somersaults-Tuck 207C(3.3), Reverse 3 1/2 Somersaults-Tuck 307C(3.4), Inward 4 1/2 Somersaults-Tuck 409C(4.1), Forward 2 1/2 Somersaults 3 Twists-Pike 5156B(3.8) and Armstand Back 2 Soms 2 1/2 Twists-Free 6245D(3.6). The total difficult degrees of his dives is 21.9, which is the highest in the world. Iván García is able to dive either the most difficult dive or the second most difficult dive in each of the six diving groups(forward, backward, reverse, inward, twisting and armstand groups). Among these dives, 409C is the most difficult dive being used around the world currently. In 2012 London Olympic Games, Iván García and his partner Germán Sánchez placed second in the synchronized platform—the best performance of Mexicans in synchronized diving. However, due to the difficulty of his dives, he cannot perform correctly and perfectly all the time.

== Competitive history ==
Iván García has turned to be a professional diver in 2009 in the FINA World Aquatics Championships. From then on, representing Mexico, he has been competing for FINA World Junior Diving Championships, FINA World Aquatics Championships, Youth Olympic Games, Olympic Games, FINA Diving World Cup, FINA Diving World Series, Pan American Games and Central American and Caribbean Games. He has won many medals of those competitions from 2010. He is an Olympic silver medalist in 2012 and a bronze medalist in YOG(Youth Olympic Games) in 2010. In the FINA Diving World Cup in 2014, he won his first medal in the individual 10m Platform in a world-class competition. What's more, he has won two gold medals in the Pan American Games in 2011, four gold medals in the Central American and Caribbean Games in 2010, 2014, and 2018.

Competition	2008	2009	2010	2011	2012	2013	2014	2015	2016	2018
Olympic Games, 10 m					7th				10th	
Olympic Games, 10 m (synchro)					2nd^{@}				5th^{@}	
Pan American Games, 10 m				1st				1st		
Pan American Games, 10 m (synchro)				1st^{@}				4th^{?}		
Central American and Caribbean Games, 10 m							1st			1st
Central American and Caribbean Games, 10 m (synchro)			1st^{@}							1st^
Summer Youth Olympics, 10 m			3rd							
Summer Youth Olympics, 3 m			11th							
Summer Universiade, 10 m						5th				
Summer Universiade, 10 m (synchro)						3rd^{@}				
Summer Universiade, team (men)						3rd				
FINA World Championships, 10 m				7th		5th		4th		
FINA World Championships, 10 m (synchro)		8th^{@}		7th^{@}		4th^{@}		2nd^{@}		
FINA World Championships, Mixed Team Event								6th^{*}		
FINA World Junior Diving Championships, Group B, 10 m	5th									
FINA World Junior Diving Championships, Group A, 10 m			10th							
FINA Diving World Cup, 10 m							3rd		9th	
FINA Diving World Cup, 10 m (synchro)			7th^{@}		2nd^{@}		5th^{@}		12th^{@}	
FINA Diving World Series, Overall Ranking, 10 m					10th	2nd	10th	5th	14th	
FINA Diving World Series, Overall Ranking, 10 m (synchro)			4th^{@}	3rd^{@}	7th^{@}	3rd^{@#}	3rd^{@}	3rd^{@}	7th^{@}	
FINA Diving Grand Prix, Overall Ranking, 10 m (synchro)^{%}				3rd^{@}	2nd^{@}					
FINA Diving World Series, Qingdao, China, 10 m (synchro)			4th^{@}							
FINA Diving World Series, Beijing, China, 10 m					8th	5th		8th		
FINA Diving World Series, Beijing, China, 10 m (synchro)				4th^{@}	6th^{@}	3rd^{#}		3rd^{@}		
FINA Diving World Series, Dubai, UAE, 10 m					8th	5th		4th		
FINA Diving World Series, Dubai, UAE, 10 m (synchro)					7th^{@}	4th^{#}		2nd^{@}		
FINA Diving World Series, Moscow, RUS, 10 m							5th			
FINA Diving World Series, Moscow, RUS, 10 m (synchro)							1st^{@}			
FINA Diving World Series, Kazan, RUS, 10 m								8th	9th	
FINA Diving World Series, Kazan, RUS, 10 m (synchro)								2nd^{@}	6th^{@}	
FINA Diving World Series, Sheiffield, GBR, 10 m (synchro)				4th^{@}						
FINA Diving World Series, Edinburgh, GBR, 10 m						3rd				
FINA Diving World Series, Edinburgh, GBR, 10 m (synchro)						3rd^{@}				
FINA Diving World Series, London, GBR, 10 m							10th	4th		
FINA Diving World Series, London, GBR, 10 m (synchro)							4th^{@}	3rd^{@}		
FINA Diving World Series, Veracruz, MEX, 10 m (synchro)			5th^{@}							
FINA Diving World Series, Veracruz, MEX, 10 m (synchro)^{§}			2nd^{@}							
FINA Diving World Series, Guanajuato, MEX, 10 m (synchro)				1st^{@}						
FINA Diving World Series, Tijuana, MEX, 10 m					8th					
FINA Diving World Series, Tijuana, MEX, 10 m (synchro)					2nd^{@}					
FINA Diving World Series, Guadalajara, MEX, 10 m						2nd				
FINA Diving World Series, Guadalajara, MEX, 10 m (synchro)						1st^{@}				
FINA Diving World Series, Guadalajara, MEX, 10 m^{†}						3rd				
FINA Diving World Series, Guadalajara, MEX, 10 m (synchro)^{†}						1st^{@}				
FINA Diving World Series, Monterrey, MEX, 10 m							4th			
FINA Diving World Series, Monterrey, MEX, 10 m (synchro)							2nd^{@}			
FINA Diving World Series, Mérida, MEX, 10 m								2nd		
FINA Diving World Series, Mérida, MEX, 10 m (synchro)								1st^{@}		
FINA Diving World Series, Windsor, CAN, 10 m							8th	8th	8th	
FINA Diving World Series, Windsor, CAN, 10 m (synchro)							3rd^{@}	5th^{@}		

^{@}with Germán Sánchez
^{#}with Zuñiga Adan

^{?}with Jonathan Ruvalcaba
^{*}with Arantxa Chávez

^with Andreas Isaac Villarreal
^{§}Veracruz, MEX held two legs of 2010 FINA Diving World Series.
^{†} Guadalajara, MEX held two legs of 2013 FINA Diving World Series.
^{%} With different pairs.
