= Artem Chesakov =

Russian diver

Personal information
- Born: 20 October 1993 (age 32)

Sport
- Country: Russia
- Events: 10m, 10m synchro
Medal record
World Championships
Silver medal – second place	2013 Barcelona	Platform synchro
Summer Universiade
Silver medal – second place	2013 Kazan	Team
Silver medal – second place	2013 Kazan	10 m synchro

Artem Chesakov (Russian: Артем Чесаков; born 20 October 1993) is a Russian diver. He competed at the 2013 Summer Universiade and 2013 World Aquatics Championships in the Men's synchronized 10 metre platform.
