= Zhang Yanquan =

Chinese diver (born 1994)

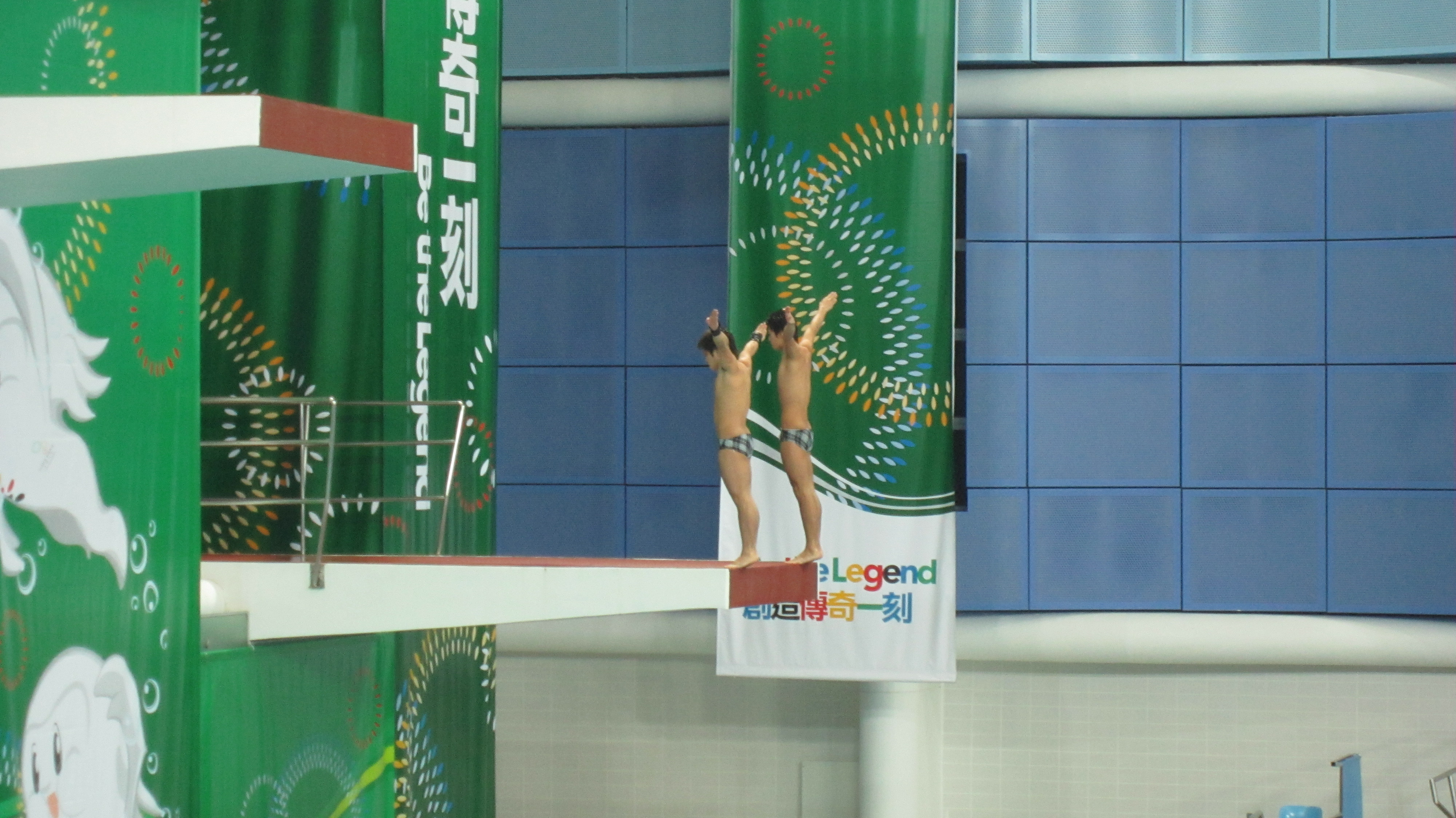
- Zhang Yangquan and Chen Aisen at the 2009 East Asian Games

Personal information
- Native name: 张雁全
- Born: 13 June 13, 1994 (age 32) Chaozhou, Guangdong
Medal record
Representing China
Men's Diving
Olympic Games
Gold medal – first place	2012 London	10m synchro
World Championships
Bronze medal – third place	2013 Barcelona	10 m synchro
FINA Diving World Cup
Gold medal – first place	2010 Guangzhou	10m synchro
Gold medal – first place	2012 London	10m synchro
East Asian Games
Gold medal – first place	2009 Hong Kong	10m platform
Gold medal – first place	2009 Hong Kong	10m synchro

Zhang Yanquan (simplified Chinese: 张雁全; traditional Chinese: 張雁全; pinyin: Zhāng Yànquán; born June 13, 1994, in Chaozhou, Guangdong) is a Chinese diver of Hakka ancestry from Dabu, Guangdong. He competed at the 2012 Summer Olympics in the Men's synchronized 10 metre platform, winning the gold medal.

== See also ==
- China at the 2012 Summer Olympics
