= He Zi =

Chinese diver (born 1990)

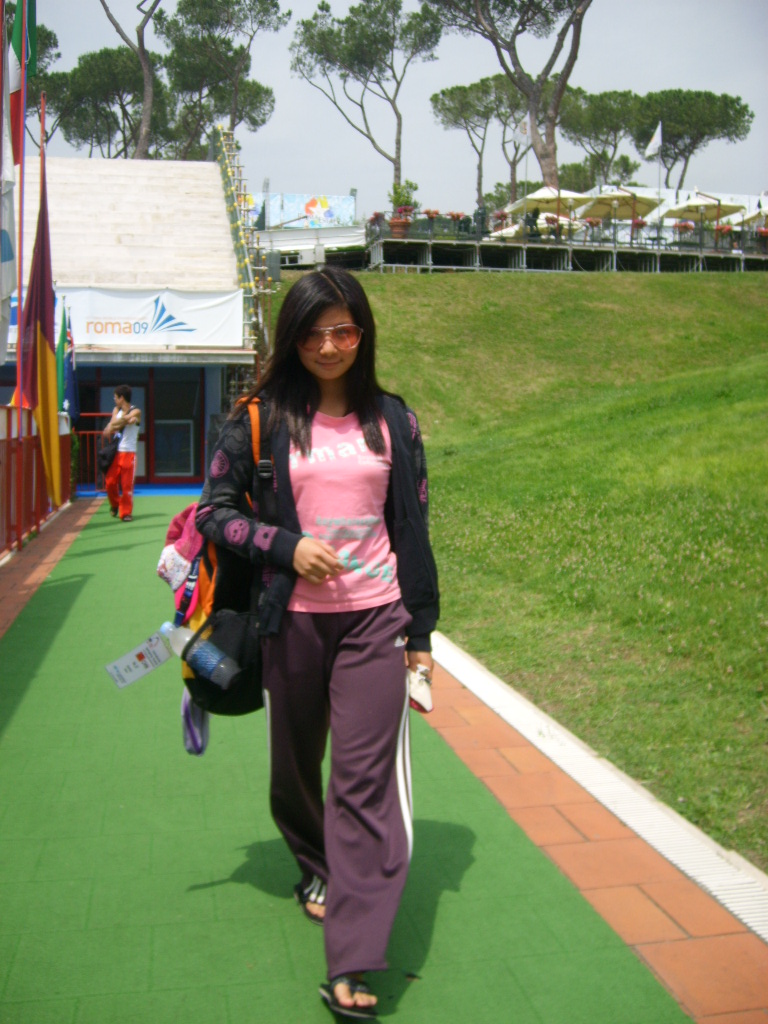
- He at the 2009 World Aquatics Championships

Personal information
- Nationality: Chinese
- Born: 11 December 1990 (age 35) Nanning, Guangxi, China
- Height: 1.59 m (5 ft 3 in)
- Weight: 54 kg (119 lb)
- Spouse: Qin Kai (m. 2017)

Sport
- Sport: Diving
- Event(s): 1 m, 3 m, 3 m synchro
Medal record
Event	1st	2nd	3rd
Olympic Games	1	2	–
World Championships	4	2	1
Summer Universiade	3	-	-
FINA Diving World Cup	3	2	–
Asian Games	1	2	–
Total	12	8	1
Women's diving
Representing China
Olympic Games
Gold medal – first place	2012 London	3 m synchro
Silver medal – second place	2012 London	3 m springboard
Silver medal – second place	2016 Rio de Janeiro	3 m springboard
World Championships
Gold medal – first place	2007 Melbourne	1 m springboard
Gold medal – first place	2011 Shanghai	3 m synchro springboard
Gold medal – first place	2013 Barcelona	1 m springboard
Gold medal – first place	2013 Barcelona	3 m springboard
Silver medal – second place	2011 Shanghai	3 m springboard
Silver medal – second place	2015 Kazan	3 m springboard
Bronze medal – third place	2015 Kazan	1 m springboard
Asian Games
Gold medal – first place	2010 Guangzhou	3 m springboard
Silver medal – second place	2006 Doha	1 m springboard
Silver medal – second place	2006 Doha	3 m springboard
Universiade
Gold medal – first place	2011 Shenzhen	Team
Gold medal – first place	2011 Shenzhen	3 m springboard
Gold medal – first place	2011 Shenzhen	3 m synchro
FINA Diving World Cup
Gold medal – first place	2010 Jiangsu	3 m springboard
Gold medal – first place	2010 Jiangsu	3 m synchro
Gold medal – first place	2012 London	3 m synchro
Silver medal – second place	2012 London	3 m springboard
Silver medal – second place	2014 Shanghai	3 m springboard

He Zi (Chinese: 何姿; pinyin: Hé Zī; born 11 December 1990) is an Olympic medal winning Chinese female diver, specialising in the 1 meter springboard, 3 meter springboard and 3 meter synchronised dive.

== Career ==
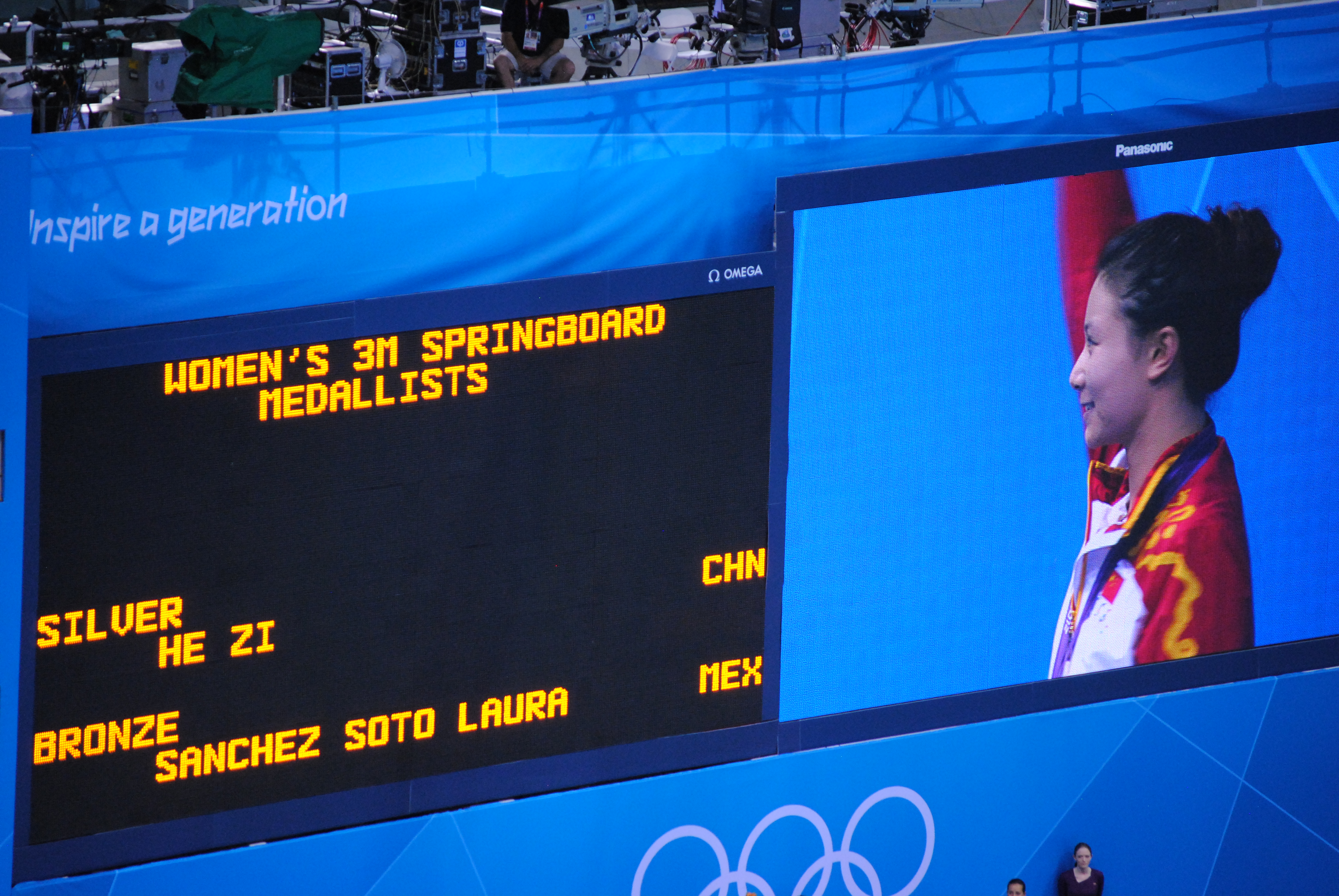
He Zi during the victory ceremony for women's 3 metre springboard at the 2012 Summer Olympics.

Among her achievements are:

- 2006 – silver medal in both the 1 m and 3 m springboard events of the Asian Games.
- 2007 – gold medal in the women's 1 m springboard event of the World Aquatics Championships.
- 2009 – gold medal in the women's 3 m springboard event of the FINA Diving World Series.
- 2010 – won gold in 3 m springboard and gold (with Wu Minxia) in the synchronised 3 m springboard at the 17th FINA Diving World Cup.
- 2011 – won gold (with Wu Minxia) in the synchronised 3 m springboard and silver in the 3 m springboard at the 2011 World Aquatics Championships.
- 2012 – won gold (with Wu Minxia) in women's 3m springboard synchronized diving at the 2012 Summer Olympics.
- 2012 – won silver in 3m in women's 3m springboard diving at the 2012 Summer Olympics.
- 2013 - won gold in 1m springboard in 2013 World Championships in Barcelona, beating Tania Cognotto of Italy by just 0.1 points.
- 2016 – won silver in 3m in women's 3m springboard diving at the 2016 Summer Olympics.

== Personal life ==
Right after she won silver in the 3m springboard dive on 14 August 2016, He Zi accepted a marriage proposal by boyfriend and fellow diver Qin Kai, whom she has dated for 6 years. They married in June 2017, and in July she announced her retirement from international competition. Their daughter was born in October 2017.

== See also ==
- China at the 2012 Summer Olympics
- China at the 2016 Summer Olympics

Awards
Preceded by (China) Wu Minxia	FINA Female Diver of the Year; 2013	Succeeded by (China) Liu Huixia
