= Yang Jian (diver) =

Chinese diver

Personal information
- Nationality: Chinese
- Born: 10 June 1994 (age 32) Luzhou, Sichuan, China
- Height: 1.68 m (5 ft 6 in)
- Weight: 63 kg (139 lb)

Sport
- Country: China
- Sport: Diving
- Event: 10 m
- Club: Sichuan Province
Medal record
Men's diving
Representing China
Olympic Games
Silver medal – second place	2020 Tokyo	10 m platform
World Championships
Gold medal – first place	2019 Gwangju	10 m platform
Gold medal – first place	2019 Gwangju	Mixed team
Gold medal – first place	2022 Budapest	10 m platform
Bronze medal – third place	2017 Budapest	10 m platform

Yang Jian (Chinese: 杨健; pinyin: Yáng Jiàn; born 10 June 1994) is a Chinese diver.

Yang started practicing gymnastics on his parents' will aged four and five years later he took up diving. His desire for risky jumps quickly brought him the nickname "King of Difficulty" amongst teammates. He won gold in the 10m platform event at the 2014 FINA Diving World Cup. Shortly after his international debut, he became the first one in history to accomplish a dive with difficulty of 4.1 since the regulation was introduced and set a world record for a single jump to 123 points. But in the following year, Yang finished his first tour to the world championships due to knee injury with the unexpected 10th place. Another right heel injury during training in November 2018 forced him to take surgery and rest for a month. In 2021, Yang won a silver medal in the 10m platform event at the 2020 Summer Olympics in Tokyo.
