= Ryan Hawkins =

American basketball player (born 1997)

No. 44 – Bosna
- Position: Power forward
- League: Bosnian League; ABA League; EuroCup

Personal information
- Born: May 12, 1997 (age 29) Atlantic, Iowa, U.S.
- Listed height: 6 ft 7 in (2.01 m)
- Listed weight: 233 lb (106 kg)

Career information
- High school: Atlantic (Atlantic, Iowa)
- College: Northwest Missouri State (2017–2021); Creighton (2021–2022)
- NBA draft: 2022: undrafted
- Playing career: 2022–present

Career history
- 2022–2023: Raptors 905
- 2023–2024: Pistoia Basket 2000
- 2024–2025: Stade Rochelais
- 2025–2026: Fraport Skyliners
- 2026–present: Bosna

Career highlights
- Second-team All-Big East (2022); 2× NCAA Division II champion (2019, 2021); NCAA Division II Tournament MOP (2021); First-team Division II All-American – D2CCA (2021); 2× First-team All-MIAA (2020, 2021); Second-team All-MIAA (2019); 2× MIAA Defensive Player of the Year (2019, 2020); 3× MIAA All-Defensive Team (2019–2021)
- Stats at Basketball Reference

Ryan Andrew Hawkins (born May 12, 1997) is an American professional basketball player for Bosna of the Bosnian League, the ABA League, and the EuroCup. He played college basketball for Northwest Missouri State and Creighton.

== High school career ==
Hawkins played basketball for Atlantic High School in Atlantic, Iowa. As a senior, he averaged 22.2 points, 13.4 rebounds, 3.9 steals and 2.7 assists per game. Hawkins was named Western Iowa Male Athlete of the Year by the Omaha World-Herald. He played five other sports in high school for at least two years: track and field, soccer, baseball, football and cross country. Hawkins originally committed to playing college basketball for Wayne State in Nebraska, but due to a coaching change, he switched his commitment to Northwest Missouri State.

== College career ==
After redshirting his first year at Northwest Missouri State, in which the team won the NCAA Division II national title, Hawkins averaged 5.4 points and 3.5 rebounds per game as a freshman. In his sophomore season, he helped his team achieve a 38–0 record and win the national championship. Hawkins averaged 13.9 points and 8.9 rebounds per game, earning Second Team All-Mid-America Intercollegiate Athletics Association (MIAA) and Defensive Player of the Year honors. He broke the program single-season rebounding record.

On November 2, 2019, Hawkins scored a school-record 44 points with nine rebounds in a 100–88 win against Southern Nazarene. As a junior, he averaged 22.7 points, 7.4 rebounds and 2.1 steals per game, and received First Team All-MIAA and Defensive Player of the Year recognition. On March 5, 2021, during his senior season, Hawkins posted the first triple-double in MIAA Tournament history, contributing 30 points, 11 rebounds and 11 assists in a 104–72 semifinal win over Central Oklahoma. He led Northwest Missouri State to a national title and was named Elite Eight Most Outstanding Player. As a senior, Hawkins averaged 22.6 points and 8.8 rebounds per game. He was a First Team All-America selection by D2CCA, and earned First Team All-MIAA honors. Hawkins left Northwest Missouri State with the most rebounds and the second-most points, steals and three-pointers in program history.

Hawkins used his additional year of college eligibility granted due to the COVID-19 pandemic, and transferred to Creighton. On February 12, 2022, he scored a season-high 30 points and had 12 rebounds in an 80–66 win against Georgetown. Hawkins was named to the Second Team All-Big East.

== Professional career ==
After going undrafted in the 2022 NBA draft, Hawkins played for the Golden State Warriors and Toronto Raptors in the 2022 NBA Summer League. He was added to the roster of the Raptors’ NBA G League affiliate, Raptors 905.

On July 19, 2023, Hawkins signed with Giorgio Tesi Group Pistoia of the Lega Basket Serie A (LBA).

On July 24, 2024, he signed with Stade Rochelais Basket of the Pro A.

On August 16, 2025, he signed with Skyliners Frankfurt of the Basketball Bundesliga (BBL).

== Career statistics ==
Legend
GP	Games played	GS	Games started	MPG	Minutes per game
FG%	Field goal percentage	3P%	3-point field goal percentage	FT%	Free throw percentage
RPG	Rebounds per game	APG	Assists per game	SPG	Steals per game
BPG	Blocks per game	PPG	Points per game	**Bold**	Career high

=== College ===
Year	Team	GP	GS	MPG	FG%	3P%	FT%	RPG	APG	SPG	BPG	PPG
2016–17	Northwest Missouri State	Redshirt										
2017–18	Northwest Missouri State	31	0	19.0	.413	.337	.720	3.5	.3	.6	.2	5.4
2018–19	Northwest Missouri State	**38**	**38**	34.5	.515	.365	**.878**	**8.9**	1.0	**2.2**	.7	13.9
2019–20	Northwest Missouri State	32	32	34.6	**.561**	.454	.807	7.4	1.8	2.1	**.8**	**22.7**
2020–21	Northwest Missouri State	30	30	**35.4**	.540	**.460**	.763	8.8	**2.4**	1.8	.3	22.6
2021–22	Creighton University	35	35	35.0	.437	.358	.800	7.8	1.51	0.91	.37	13.8
Career		166	135	31.9	.508	.398	.80	7.3	1.4	1.5	.5	15.5

== Personal life ==
Hawkins' sister, Jessica, played basketball for Simpson College. His aunt, Deanna Winder, played basketball and softball for Cornell College.
