= Robert Páez =

Venezuelan diver (born 1994)

Personal information
- Born: June 1, 1994 (age 32) Cumaná, Sucre
- Height: 160 cm (5 ft 3 in)
- Weight: 60 kg (132 lb)

Sport
- Country: Venezuela
- Sport: Diving

Robert Alexis Páez Rodriguez (born 1 June 1994 in Cumaná) is a Venezuelan diver. He competed in the 3 m springboard at the 2012 Summer Olympics.

== Personal life ==
On 8 April 2018, Páez came out as gay.
