= Liu Huixia =

Chinese diver (born 1997)

Personal information
- Full name: Liu Huixia
- Nationality: Chinese
- Born: 30 January 1997 (age 29)
Medal record
Olympic Games
Gold medal – first place	2016 Rio de Janeiro	10 m synchro
World Championships
Gold medal – first place	2013 Barcelona	10 m synchro
Gold medal – first place	2015 Kazan	10 m synchro
Asian Games
Gold medal – first place	2014 Incheon	10 m synchro

Liu Huixia (simplified Chinese: 刘蕙瑕; traditional Chinese: 劉蕙瑕; pinyin: Liú Huìxiá, born 30 January 1997) is a Chinese female diver. As the partner of Chen Ruolin at synchronized 10 metre platform, she won the gold medal at the 2013 World Championships in Barcelona and 2015 World Championships in Kazan. The pair were also champions at the 2016 Olympics in Rio de Janeiro. Liu was born in Daye, Hubei.

Awards
Preceded by (China) He Zi	FINA Female Diver of the Year; 2014	Succeeded by (China) Shi Tingmao
