= Víctor Ortega =

Colombian diver (born 1988)

Personal information
- Nationality: Colombian
- Born: January 27, 1988 (age 38) Medellín, Colombia

Sport
- Sport: Diving
Medal record
Representing Colombia
Men's diving
Pan American Games
Silver medal – second place	2015 Toronto	10 m platform
Bronze medal – third place	2007 Rio de Janeiro	10 m synchro
Bronze medal – third place	2015 Toronto	10 m synchro
South American Games
Bronze medal – third place	2014 Santiago	10 m platform

Víctor Hugo Ortega Serna (born January 27, 1988) is a Colombian diver, who competed in the 2008 Summer Olympics of Beijing for his native country. He and his teammate Juan Urán finished in 6th position in the 10 m synchronized platform event. He competed again at the 2012 Summer Olympics, in the individual 10 m platform event. At the 2016 Olympics, he again competed in the 10 m platform event.
