= Lin Yue =

Chinese diver

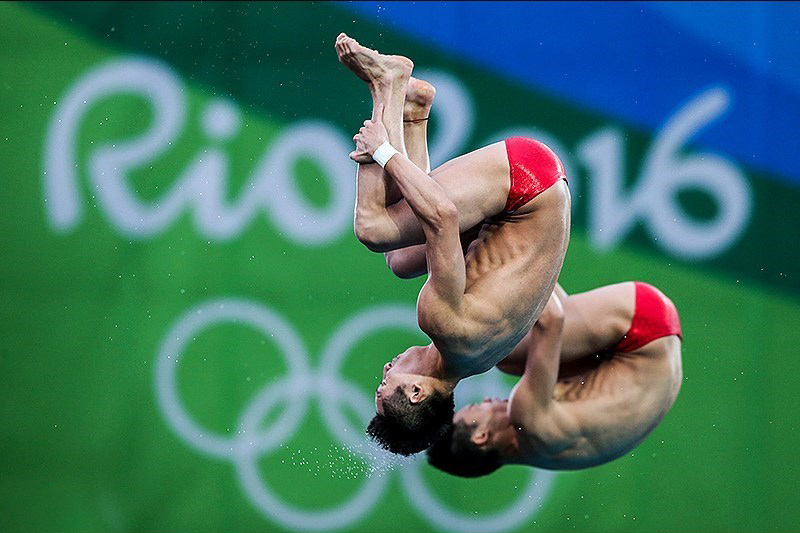

Personal information
- Nationality: Chinese
- Born: July 24, 1991 (age 35) Chaozhou, Guangdong
- Height: 1.57 m (5 ft 2 in)

Sport
- Sport: Diving
- Events: 10 m, 10 m synchro
Medal record
Event	1st	2nd	3rd
Olympic Games	2	-	-
World Championships	3	-	1
Summer Universiade	2	-	-
FINA Diving World Cup	3	1	-
Asian Games	2	-	-
Olympic Games
Gold medal – first place	2008 Beijing	10m synchro
Gold medal – first place	2016 Rio de Janeiro	10m synchro
World Championships
Gold medal – first place	2007 Melbourne	10m synchro
Gold medal – first place	2009 Rome	10m synchro
Gold medal – first place	2015 Kazan	10 m synchro
Bronze medal – third place	2007 Melbourne	10m platform
Summer Universiade
Gold medal – first place	2011 Shenzhen	Team
Gold medal – first place	2011 Shenzhen	10 m synchro
FINA Diving World Cup
Gold medal – first place	2006 Changshu	10m synchro
Gold medal – first place	2008 Beijing	10m synchro
Gold medal – first place	2016 Rio de Janeiro	10m synchro
Silver medal – second place	2006 Changshu	10m platform
Asian Games
Gold medal – first place	2006 Doha	10m platform
Gold medal – first place	2006 Doha	10m synchro

Lin Yue (simplified Chinese: 林跃; traditional Chinese: 林躍; pinyin: Lín Yuè; born July 24, 1991, in Chaozhou, Guangdong) is a Chinese diver and a double Olympic gold medal winner. He competed for Team China in Diving at the 2008 Summer Olympics in Beijing and won gold with Huo Liang in the Men's synchronized 10 metre platform. He also won gold in the same event at the 2016 Summer Olympics in Rio with Chen Aisen.

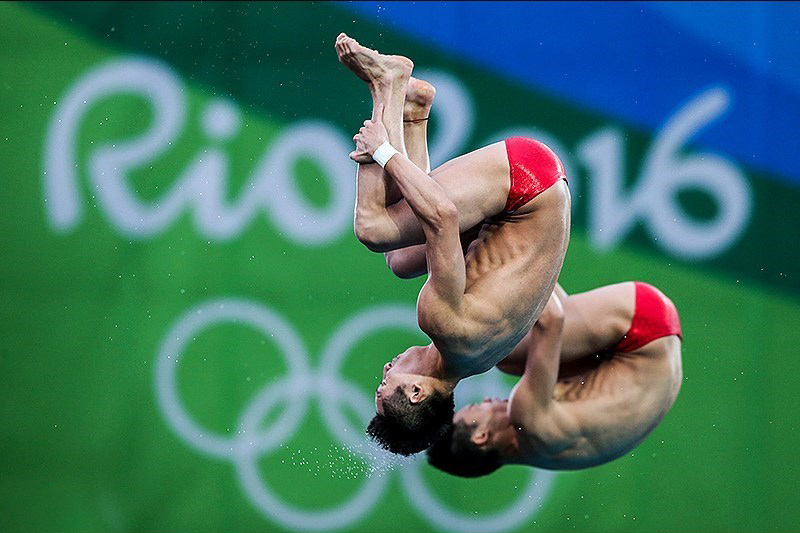
Chen Aisen and Lin Yue at the Rio Olympics

== Background ==
Lin Yue started diving when he was little, training in a sporting school in his hometown, with a coach named Li Huansen (李焕森). In the following five years, he went to Guangdong Provincial Weilun Sporting School (广东省伟伦体育学校), under instructor Cao Ke (曹科). In the year 2004, he was selected in the Beijing Diving team. His current coach is Zhong Shaozhen (钟少珍).

== Major achievements ==
He claimed the bronze medal in the 2007 World Aquatics Championships. He claimed the gold medal at the 2008 World Cup - 10m platform synchro. He won gold medals in the Men's synchronized 10m platform at the 2008 Summer Olympics in Beijing, the 2009 FINA World Championships in Rome, and the 2016 Summer Olympics in Rio. He became the first diver to win a second Olympic gold medal in this event.

He also competed at the 2012 Summer Olympics in the men's 10 metre platform event.
