= Jeinkler Aguirre =

Cuban diver (born 1990)

Personal information
- Nationality: Cuba
- Born: 14 June 1990 (age 36) Camagüey, Cuba

Sport
- Sport: Diving
- Event: 10m Platform
Medal record
Men's diving
Representing Cuba
Pan American Games
Gold medal – first place	2015 Toronto	10m platform synchro
Silver medal – second place	2011 Guadalajara	10m platform synchro
- Updated on 26 May 2024

Jeinkler Aguirre (born 14 June 1990 in Camaguey) is a Cuban diver. At the 2008 Olympics, he competed in the men's 10 m platform diving event. He competed in the same event at the 2012 Summer Olympics and in the Men's synchronized 10 metre platform with José Antonio Guerra.
