= José Guerra (diver) =

Cuban diver (born 1979)

Personal information
- Born: 9 August 1979 (age 47) Santiago de Cuba
Medal record
Men's diving
Representing Cuba
World Championships
Silver medal – second place	2005 Montréal	10m Platform
Bronze medal – third place	2009 Rome	10m Platform Synchro
Universiade
Gold medal – first place	1999 Palma de Mallorca	10 m platform
Silver medal – second place	2001 Beijing	10m Platform
Bronze medal – third place	2001 Beijing	Synchronized platform
Pan American Games
Gold medal – first place	2007 Rio de Janeiro	10m Platform
Gold medal – first place	2007 Rio de Janeiro	10m Platform Synchro
Silver medal – second place	1999 Winnipeg	10m Platform
Silver medal – second place	2011 Guadalajara	10m Platform Synchro
Central American and Caribbean Games
Gold medal – first place	2006 Cartagena	3m Springboard
Gold medal – first place	2006 Cartagena	10m Platform

José Antonio Guerra Oliva (born 9 August 1979 in Santiago de Cuba) is a male diver from Cuba. He represented his native country at four consecutive Summer Olympics, starting in 2000 (Sydney, Australia). Guerra won a gold and three silver medals at Pan American Games during his career. He also won 2 gold medals at Central American Games becoming the only Cuban male diver in history achieving this.

The Cuban diver is the only diver in his country to win a gold medal at World University Games in 1999 Palma de Mallorca adding a silver and a bronze in Beijing in 2001. Being the only Cuban diver to lead the Diving World Ranking in the history, back in 2005. Winner of Forty (40) medals at the Diving Grand Prix and 130 medals total along his career (until April 2011) (98 in international events and 32 in nationals), and is considered the best diver in Cuba of all time. His coach is Lino Socorro Aleman, from Matanzas, Cuba.

Since his retirement from diving, Guerra now works as a coach for Team Canada.
