= 2015 FINA Diving World Series =

International diving competition series

The 2015 FINA Diving World Series is the seventh edition of FINA Diving World Series. This World Series was made up by six legs hosted in different cities: 1st leg Beijing, China; 2nd leg Dubai, United Arab Emirates; 3rd leg Kazan, Russia; 4th leg London, Great Britain; 5th leg Windsor, Canada; and 6th leg Mérida, Mexico.

== Overall medal tally ==
Rank	Nation	Gold	Silver	Bronze	Total
1	China (CHN)	50	17	7	74
2	Great Britain (GBR)	4	4	12	20
3	Canada (CAN)	3	15	10	28
4	Mexico (MEX)	2	8	10	20
5	Russia (RUS)	1	4	4	9
6	Germany (GER)	0	4	10	14
7	Australia (AUS)	0	3	1	4
8	Malaysia (MAS)	0	2	3	5
9	United States (USA)	0	2	0	2
10	Italy (ITA)	0	1	1	2
11	Cuba (CUB)	0	0	1	1
11	Ukraine (UKR)	0	0	1	1
Totals (12 entries)		60	60	60	180

== Beijing leg ==
The results from the Beijing leg are as follows.

=== Medal table ===
Rank	Nation	Gold	Silver	Bronze	Total
1	China (CHN)	10	3	0	13
2	Canada (CAN)	0	2	3	5
3	Germany (GER)	0	1	3	4
4	Australia (AUS)	0	1	0	1
4	Malaysia (MAS)	0	1	0	1
4	Russia (RUS)	0	1	0	1
4	United States (USA)	0	1	0	1
8	Mexico (MEX)	0	0	3	3
9	Great Britain (GBR)	0	0	1	1
Totals (9 entries)		10	10	10	30

=== Medal summary ===
==== Men ====
Event	Gold	Silver	Bronze
3-metre springboard	He Chong (CHN)	Cao Yuan (CHN)	Patrick Hausding (GER)
10-metre platform	Yang Jian (CHN)	David Boudia (USA)	Sascha Klein (GER)
Synchronized; 3-metre springboard	Cao Yuan (CHN); Qin Kai (CHN)	Evgeny Kuznetsov (RUS); Ilya Zakharov (RUS)	Stephan Feck (GER); Patrick Hausding (GER)
Synchronized; 10-metre platform	Chen Aisen (CHN); Lin Yue (CHN)	Patrick Hausding (GER); Sascha Klein (GER)	Iván García (MEX); Germán Sánchez (MEX)

==== Women ====
Event	Gold	Silver	Bronze
3-metre springboard	Shi Tingmao (CHN)	He Zi (CHN)	Pamela Ware (CAN)
10-metre platform	Liu Huixia (CHN)	Chen Ruolin (CHN)	Meaghan Benfeito (CAN)
Synchronized; 3-metre springboard	Shi Tingmao (CHN); Wu Minxia (CHN)	Maddison Keeney (AUS); Anabelle Smith (AUS)	Alicia Blagg (GBR); Rebecca Gallantree (GBR)
Synchronized; 10-metre platform	Chen Ruolin (CHN); Liu Huixia (CHN)	Mun Yee Leong (MAS); Cheong Jun Hoong (MAS)	Meaghan Benfeito (CAN); Roseline Filion (CAN)

==== Mixed ====
Event	Gold	Silver	Bronze
Synchronized; 3-metre springboard	Chen Aisen (CHN); He Zi (CHN)	Jennifer Abel (CAN); François Imbeau-Dulac (CAN)	Dolores Hernandez (MEX); Rommel Pacheco (MEX)
Synchronized; 10-metre platform	Lian Jie (CHN); Tai Xiaohu (CHN)	Meaghan Benfeito (CAN); Vincent Riendeau (CAN)	Paola Espinosa (MEX); Jahir Ocampo (MEX)

== Dubai leg ==
The results of the Dubai leg are as follows.

=== Medal table ===
Rank	Nation	Gold	Silver	Bronze	Total
1	China (CHN)	9	3	2	14
2	Great Britain (GBR)	1	1	1	3
3	Canada (CAN)	0	4	1	5
4	Mexico (MEX)	0	1	2	3
5	Russia (RUS)	0	1	0	1
6	Germany (GER)	0	0	2	2
7	Malaysia (MAS)	0	0	1	1
7	Ukraine (UKR)	0	0	1	1
Totals (8 entries)		10	10	10	30

=== Medal summary ===
==== Men ====
Event	Gold	Silver	Bronze
3-metre springboard	Jack Laugher (GBR)	He Chong (CHN)	Cao Yuan (CHN)
10-metre platform	Qiu Bo (CHN)	Thomas Daley (GBR)	Yang Jian (CHN)
Synchronized; 3-metre springboard	Cao Yuan (CHN); Qin Kai (CHN)	Evgeny Kuznetsov (RUS); Ilya Zakharov (RUS)	Stephan Feck (GER); Patrick Hausding (GER)
Synchronized; 10-metre platform	Chen Aisen (CHN); Lin Yue (CHN)	Iván García (MEX); Germán Sánchez (MEX)	Patrick Hausding (GER); Sascha Klein (GER)

==== Women ====
Event	Gold	Silver	Bronze
3-metre springboard	Shi Tingmao (CHN)	He Zi (CHN)	Jennifer Abel (CAN)
10-metre platform	Chen Ruolin (CHN)	Liu Huixia (CHN)	Tonia Couch (GBR)
Synchronized; 3-metre springboard	Shi Tingmao (CHN); Wu Minxia (CHN)	Jennifer Abel (CAN); Pamela Ware (CAN)	Dolores Hernandez (MEX); Paola Espinosa (MEX)
Synchronized; 10-metre platform	Chen Ruolin (CHN); Liu Huixia (CHN)	Meaghan Benfeito (CAN); Roseline Filion (CAN)	Mun Yee Leong (MAS); Cheong Jun Hoong (MAS)

==== Mixed ====
Event	Gold	Silver	Bronze
Synchronized; 3-metre springboard	Chen Aisen (CHN); He Zi (CHN)	Jennifer Abel (CAN); François Imbeau-Dulac (CAN)	Viktoriya Kesar (UKR); Maksym Dolgov (UKR)
Synchronized; 10-metre platform	Lian Jie (CHN); Tai Xiaohu (CHN)	Meaghan Benfeito (CAN); Vincent Riendeau (CAN)	Alejandra Orozco (MEX); Jahir Ocampo (MEX)

== Kazan leg ==
The results of the Kazan leg are as follows.

=== Medal table ===
Rank	Nation	Gold	Silver	Bronze	Total
1	China (CHN)	8	1	2	11
2	Canada (CAN)	1	5	0	6
3	Great Britain (GBR)	1	0	2	3
4	Russia (RUS)	0	2	2	4
5	Mexico (MEX)	0	2	1	3
6	Germany (GER)	0	0	2	2
7	Italy (ITA)	0	0	1	1
Totals (7 entries)		10	10	10	30

=== Medal summary ===
==== Men ====
Event	Gold	Silver	Bronze
3-metre springboard	Jack Laugher (GBR)	Ilya Zakharov (RUS)	Patrick Hausding (GER)
10-metre platform	Qiu Bo (CHN)	Germán Sánchez (MEX)	Yang Jian (CHN)
Synchronized; 3-metre springboard	Cao Yuan (CHN); Qin Kai (CHN)	Evgeny Kuznetsov (RUS); Ilya Zakharov (RUS)	Jahir Ocampo (MEX); Rommel Pacheco (MEX)
Synchronized; 10-metre platform	Chen Aisen (CHN); Lin Yue (CHN)	Iván García (MEX); Germán Sánchez (MEX)	Patrick Hausding (GER); Sascha Klein (GER)

==== Women ====
Event	Gold	Silver	Bronze
3-metre springboard	Shi Tingmao (CHN)	Jennifer Abel (CAN)	Wang Han (CHN)
10-metre platform	Meaghan Benfeito (CAN)	Chen Ruolin (CHN)	Tonia Couch (GBR)
Synchronized; 3-metre springboard	Shi Tingmao (CHN); Wu Minxia (CHN)	Jennifer Abel (CAN); Pamela Ware (CAN)	Kristina Ilinykh (RUS); Nadezhda Bazhina (RUS)
Synchronized; 10-metre platform	Chen Ruolin (CHN); Liu Huixia (CHN)	Meaghan Benfeito (CAN); Roseline Filion (CAN)	Sarah Barrow (GBR); Tonia Couch (GBR)

==== Mixed ====
Event	Gold	Silver	Bronze
Synchronized; 3-metre springboard	Yang Hao (CHN); Wang Han (CHN)	Jennifer Abel (CAN); François Imbeau-Dulac (CAN)	Tania Cagnotto (ITA); Maicol Verzotto (ITA)
Synchronized; 10-metre platform	Lian Junjie (CHN); Si Yajie (CHN)	Meaghan Benfeito (CAN); Vincent Riendeau (CAN)	Nikita Shleikher (RUS); Yulia Timoshinina (RUS)

== London leg ==
The results of the London leg are as follows.

=== Medal table ===
Rank	Nation	Gold	Silver	Bronze	Total
1	China (CHN)	7	3	2	12
2	Great Britain (GBR)	1	2	3	6
3	Canada (CAN)	1	1	2	4
4	Russia (RUS)	1	0	2	3
5	Germany (GER)	0	2	0	2
6	Italy (ITA)	0	1	0	1
6	Malaysia (MAS)	0	1	0	1
8	Mexico (MEX)	0	0	1	1
Totals (8 entries)		10	10	10	30

=== Medal summary ===
==== Men ====
Event	Gold	Silver	Bronze
3-metre springboard	Evgeny Kuznetsov (RUS)	Patrick Hausding (GER)	Cao Yuan (CHN)
10-metre platform	Tom Daley (GBR)	Yang Jian (CHN)	Qiu Bo (CHN)
Synchronized; 3-metre springboard	Cao Yuan (CHN); Qin Kai (CHN)	Jack Laugher (GBR); Christopher Mears (GBR)	Evgeny Kuznetsov (RUS); Ilya Zakharov (RUS)
Synchronized; 10 metre platform	Chen Aisen (CHN); Lin Yue (CHN)	Patrick Hausding (GER); Sascha Klein (GER)	Iván García (MEX); Germán Sánchez (MEX)

==== Women ====
Event	Gold	Silver	Bronze
3-metre springboard	Shi Tingmao (CHN)	Wang Han (CHN)	Pamela Ware (CAN)
10-metre platform	Roseline Filion (CAN)	Liu Huixia (CHN)	Tonia Couch (GBR)
Synchronized; 3-metre springboard	Shi Tingmao (CHN); Wu Minxia (CHN)	Tania Cagnotto (ITA); Francesca Dallape (ITA)	Jennifer Abel (CAN); Pamela Ware (CAN)
Synchronized; 10-metre platform	Chen Ruolin (CHN); Liu Huixia (CHN)	Mun Yee Leong (MAS); Cheong Jun Hoong (MAS)	Sarah Barrow (GBR); Tonia Couch (GBR)

==== Mixed ====
Event	Gold	Silver	Bronze
Synchronized; 3-metre springboard	Yang Hao (CHN); Wang Han (CHN)	Francois Imbeau-Dulac (CAN); Jennifer Abel (CAN)	James Heatley (GBR); Grace Reid (GBR)
Synchronized; 10-metre platform	Lian Junjie (CHN); Si Yajie (CHN)	Matthew Lee (GBR); Georgia Ward (GBR)	Shleikher Nikita (RUS); Timoshinina Yulia (RUS)

== Windsor leg ==
The results of the Windsor leg are as follows.

=== Medal table ===
Rank	Nation	Gold	Silver	Bronze	Total
1	China (CHN)	9	4	0	13
2	Great Britain (GBR)	1	1	2	4
3	Mexico (MEX)	0	2	2	4
4	Canada (CAN)	0	1	3	4
5	Australia (AUS)	0	1	0	1
5	United States (USA)	0	1	0	1
7	Germany (GER)	0	0	2	2
8	Malaysia (MAS)	0	0	1	1
Totals (8 entries)		10	10	10	30

=== Medal summary ===
==== Men ====
Event	Gold	Silver	Bronze
3-metre springboard	Jack Laugher (GBR)	He Chao (CHN)	Rommell Pacheco (MEX)
10-metre platform	Yang Jian (CHN)	Lin Yue (CHN)	Tom Daley (GBR)
Synchronized; 3-metre springboard	He Chao (CHN); He Chong (CHN)	Jahir Ocampo (MEX); Rommell Pacheco (MEX)	Patrick Hausding (GER); Stefan Feck (GER)
Synchronized; 10-metre platform	Yang Jian (CHN); Lin Yue (CHN)	David Boudia (USA); Steele Johnson (USA)	Patrick Hausding (GER); Sascha Klein (GER)

==== Women ====
Event	Gold	Silver	Bronze
3-metre springboard	He Zi (CHN)	Wang Han (CHN)	Jennifer Abel (CAN)
10-metre platform	Ren Qian (CHN)	Si Yajie (CHN)	Pandelela Rinong (MAS)
Synchronized; 3-metre springboard	He Zi (CHN); Wang Han (CHN)	Esther Qin (AUS); Samantha Wills (AUS)	Jennifer Abel (CAN); Pamela Ware (CAN)
Synchronized; 10-metre platform	Si Yajie (CHN); Lian Jie (CHN)	Tonia Couch (GBR); Sarah Barrow (GBR)	Meaghan Benfeito (CAN); Roseline Filion (CAN)

==== Mixed ====
Event	Gold	Silver	Bronze
Synchronized; 3-metre springboard	He Zi (CHN); Lin Yue (CHN)	Dolores Hernandez (MEX); Rommell Pacheco (MEX)	Tom Daley (GBR); Alicia Blagg (GBR)
Synchronized; 10-metre platform	Tai Xiaohu (CHN); Lian Jie (CHN)	Meaghan Benfeito (CAN); Vincent Reindeau (CAN)	Alejandra Orozco (MEX); German Sanchez (MEX)

== Mérida leg ==
The results of the Mérida leg are as follows.

=== Medal table ===
Rank	Nation	Gold	Silver	Bronze	Total
1	China (CHN)	7	3	1	11
2	Mexico (MEX)	2	3	1	6
3	Canada (CAN)	1	2	1	4
4	Australia (AUS)	0	1	1	2
4	Germany (GER)	0	1	1	2
6	Great Britain (GBR)	0	0	3	3
7	Cuba (CUB)	0	0	1	1
7	Malaysia (MAS)	0	0	1	1
7	United States (USA)	0	0	1	1
Totals (9 entries)		10	10	11	31

=== Medal summary ===
==== Men ====
Event	Gold	Silver	Bronze
3-metre springboard	Rommell Pacheco (MEX)	Jahir Ocampo (MEX)	He Chao (CHN)
10-metre platform	Yang Jian (CHN)	Iván García (MEX)	Tom Daley (GBR)
Synchronized; 3-metre springboard	He Chao (CHN); He Chong (CHN)	Jahir Ocampo (MEX); Rommell Pacheco (MEX)	Patrick Hausding (GER); Stefan Feck (GER)
Synchronized; 10-metre platform	Germán Sánchez (MEX); Iván García (MEX)	Patrick Hausding (GER); Sascha Klein (GER)	Jose Guerra (CUB); Jeinkler Aguirre (CUB)

==== Women ====
Event	Gold	Silver	Bronze
3-metre springboard	He Zi (CHN)	Wang Han (CHN)	Maddison Keeney (AUS)
10-metre platform	Si Yajie (CHN)	Ren Qian (CHN)	Tonia Couch (GBR)
Synchronized; 3-metre springboard	He Zi (CHN); Wang Han (CHN)	Esther Qin (AUS); Samantha Wills (AUS)	Jennifer Abel (CAN); Pamela Ware (CAN)
Synchronized; 10-metre platform	Si Yajie (CHN); Lian Jie (CHN)	Meaghan Benfeito (CAN); Roseline Filion (CAN)	Leong Mun Yee (MAS); Cheong Jun Hoong (MAS)

==== Mixed ====
Event	Gold	Silver	Bronze
Synchronized; 3-metre springboard	Jennifer Abel (CAN); Francois Imbeau-Dulac (CAN)	Yang Hao (CHN); Wang Han (CHN)	Tom Daley (GBR); Alicia Blagg (GBR)
Synchronized; 10-metre platform	Tai Xiaohu (CHN); Lian Jie (CHN)	Meaghan Benfeito (CAN); Vincent Reindeau (CAN)	Jahir Ocampo (MEX); Paola Espinosa (MEX)
