= 2015 European Diving Championships – Men's 3 metre synchro springboard =

The men's 3-metre synchro springboard event at the 2015 European Diving Championships was won by the Russian team of Evgeny Kuznetsov and Ilya Zakharov. Nine teams took part in the finals.

== Medalists ==
Gold	Silver	Bronze
Evgeny Kuznetsov; Ilya Zakharov; Russia	Illya Kvasha; Oleksandr Gorshkovozov; Ukraine	Patrick Hausding; Stephan Feck; Germany

== Results ==
Green denotes finalists

Rank	Diver	Nationality	Preliminary		Final	
Rank	Diver	Nationality	Points	Rank	Points	Rank
1st place, gold medalist(s)	Ilya Zakharov; Evgeny Kuznetsov	Russia	422,94	1	462,96	1
2nd place, silver medalist(s)	Illya Kvasha; Oleksandr Gorshkovozov	Ukraine	418,50	2	430,89	2
3rd place, bronze medalist(s)	Patrick Hausding; Stephan Feck	Germany	413,28	3	419,73	3
4	Andrzej Rzeszutek; Kacper Lesiak	Poland	379,41	4	375,87	4
5	Michele Benedetti; Tommaso Rinaldi	Italy	337,59	8	373,38	5
6	Jack Haslam; Freddie Woodward	United Kingdom	365,28	5	372,39	6
7	Yauheni Karaliou; Andrei Pavluk	Belarus	364,98	6	370,38	7
8	Nicolás García; Héctor García	Spain	354,45	7	357,18	8
9	Jouni Kallunki; Otto Lehtonen	Finland	324,54	9	352,26	9
