= 2013 European Diving Championships – Men's 3 metre synchro springboard =

Men's 3 metre synchro springboard at the 2013 European Diving Championships
- Dates: June 21
- Competitors: 16 from 8 nations
- Winning points: 460.44

Medalists
| gold medal | Evgeny Kuznetsov; Ilya Zakharov | Russia |
| silver medal | Patrick Hausding; Stephan Feck | Germany |
| bronze medal | Oleksandr Gorshkovozov; Oleg Kolodiy | Ukraine |

2013 European Diving Championships
| 1 m springboard | men | | women |
| 3 m springboard | men | | women |
| 10 m platform | men | | women |
| Synchronized; 3 m springboard | men | | women |
| Synchronized; 10 m platform | men | | women |
| Team | | team |

The men's 3 metre synchro springboard competition at the 2013 European Diving Championships was held on June 21 with a preliminary round and the final.

== Results ==
The preliminary round was held at 12:00 and the final was held at 17:30.

Green denotes finalists

| Rank | Diver | Nationality | Preliminary | | Final | |
| Rank | Diver | Nationality | Points | Rank | Points | Rank |
|---|---|---|---|---|---|---|
| 1st place, gold medalist(s) | Evgeny Kuznetsov; Ilya Zakharov | Russia | 411.66 | 1 | 460.44 | 1 |
| 2nd place, silver medalist(s) | Patrick Hausding; Stephan Feck | Germany | 410.43 | 2 | 431.58 | 2 |
| 3rd place, bronze medalist(s) | Oleksandr Gorshkovozov; Oleg Kolodiy | Ukraine | 391.47 | 3 | 422.52 | 3 |
| 4 | Yauheni Karaliou; Andrei Pawluk | Belarus | 362.46 | 5 | 366.42 | 4 |
| 5 | Andreas Nader Billi; Giovanni Tocci | Italy | 377.22 | 4 | 366.06 | 5 |
| 6 | Stefanos Paparounas; Michail Nektario Fafalis | Greece | 318.84 | 7 | 337.44 | 6 |
| 7 | Espen Valheim; Daniel Jensen | Norway | 315.27 | 8 | 337.26 | 7 |
| 8 | Héctor García; Nicolas García | Spain | 318.96 | 6 | 334.44 | 8 |
