= 2013 European Diving Championships – Men's 10 metre platform =

Men's 10 metre platform at the 2013 European Diving Championships
- Dates: June 23
- Competitors: 16 from 10 nations
- Winning points: 521.45

Medalists
gold medal	Oleksandr Bondar	Ukraine
silver medal	Patrick Hausding	Germany
bronze medal	Victor Minibaev	Russia

2013 European Diving Championships
1 m springboard	men		women
3 m springboard	men		women
10 m platform	men		women
Synchronized; 3 m springboard	men		women
Synchronized; 10 m platform	men		women
Team		team

The men's 10 metre platform competition at the 2013 European Diving Championships will be held on June 23 with a preliminary round and the final.

== Results ==
The preliminary round was held at 12:00 and the final was held at 16:30.

Green denotes finalists

Rank	Diver	Nationality	Preliminary		Final	
Rank	Diver	Nationality	Points	Rank	Points	Rank
1st place, gold medalist(s)	Oleksandr Bondar	Ukraine	480.15	1	521.45	1
2nd place, silver medalist(s)	Patrick Hausding	Germany	459.55	2	514.65	2
3rd place, bronze medalist(s)	Victor Minibaev	Russia	459.40	3	500.35	3
4	Sergey Nazin	Russia	450.95	4	485.10	4
5	Anton Zakharov	Ukraine	361.10	11	483.55	5
6	Vadim Kaptur	Belarus	429.15	5	471.70	6
7	Andrea Chiarabini	Italy	355.15	12	435.20	7
8	Maicol Verzotto	Italy	379.20	9	412.80	8
9	James Denny	Great Britain	386.75	8	405.10	9
10	Daniel Goodfellow	Great Britain	406.40	6	399.05	10
11	Espen Valheim	Norway	368.95	10	369.15	11
12	Dominik Stein	Germany	390.10	7	342.15	12
13	Jesper Tolvers	Sweden	351.10	13		
14	Daniel Jensen	Norway	342.35	14		
15	Heikki Makikallio	Finland	300.15	15		
16	Cătălin Constantin Cozma	Romania	275.55	16		
