= 2013 European Diving Championships – Men's 1 metre springboard =

Men's 1 m springboard at the 2013 European Diving Championships
- Dates: June 19
- Competitors: 29 from 17 nations
- Winning points: 467.75

Medalists
gold medal	Illya Kvasha	Ukraine
silver medal	Martin Wolfram	Germany
bronze medal	Oliver Homuth	Germany

2013 European Diving Championships
1 m springboard	men		women
3 m springboard	men		women
10 m platform	men		women
Synchronized; 3 m springboard	men		women
Synchronized; 10 m platform	men		women
Team		team

The men's 1 m springboard competition at the 2013 European Diving Championships was held on June 19 with a preliminary round and the final.

== Results ==
The preliminary round was held at 09:00 and the final was held at 15:30.

Green denotes finalists

Rank	Diver	Nationality	Preliminary		Final	
Rank	Diver	Nationality	Points	Rank	Points	Rank
1st place, gold medalist(s)	Illya Kvasha	Ukraine	410.80	1	467.75	1
2nd place, silver medalist(s)	Martin Wolfram	Germany	365.65	7	414.75	2
3rd place, bronze medalist(s)	Oliver Homuth	Germany	378.95	5	414.45	3
4	Constantin Blaha	Austria	334.75	9	405.95	4
5	Sergey Nazin	Russia	368.70	6	388.75	5
6	Oliver Dingley	Great Britain	395.10	2	382.35	6
7	Evgenii Novoselov	Russia	389.40	3	378.20	7
8	Andrzej Rzeszutek	Poland	380.50	4	355.40	8
9	Espen Gilje Bergslien	Norway	328.20	12	352.40	9
10	Stefanos Paparounas	Greece	339.45	8	349.50	10
11	Michele Benedetti	Italy	328.60	11	329.20	11
12	Espen Valheim	Norway	329.00	10	308.25	12
13	Vinko Paradzik	Sweden	318.80	13		
14	Yorick de Bruijn	Netherlands	317.70	14		
15	Andreas Nader Billi	Italy	315.00	15		
16	Jouni Kallunki	Finland	313.60	16		
17	Andrei Pawluk	Belarus	312.60	17		
18	Benjamin Auffret	France	306.75	18		
19	Jesper Tolvers	Sweden	298.75	19		
20	Oleg Kolodiy	Ukraine	296.55	20		
21	Joshua Dowd	Great Britain	295.05	21		
22	Yauheni Karaliou	Belarus	292.40	22		
23	Nicolás García	Spain	290.30	23		
24	Joey van Etten	Netherlands	283.50	24		
25	Fabian Brandl	Austria	271.75	25		
26	Héctor García	Spain	269.70	26		
27	Krisztian Somhegyi	Hungary	265.40	27		
28	Botond Bóta	Hungary	264.35	28		
29	Sergej Baziuk	Lithuania	224.35	29		
