= Diving at the 2014 European Aquatics Championships – Men's 3 m springboard =

Men's 3 m springboard at the Diving at the 2014 European Aquatics Championships
- Dates: 21 August
- Competitors: 27 from 17 nations
- Winning points: 487.85

Medalists
gold medal	Patrick Hausding	Germany
silver medal	Ilia Zakharov	Russia
bronze medal	Illya Kvasha	Ukraine

The Men's 3 m springboard competition of the 2014 European Aquatics Championships was held on 21 August.

== Results ==
The preliminary round was held at 12:00 and the final at 16:00.

Green denotes finalists

Rank	Diver	Nationality	Preliminary		Final	
Rank	Diver	Nationality	Points	Rank	Points	Rank
1st place, gold medalist(s)	Patrick Hausding	Germany	465.20	2	487.85	1
2nd place, silver medalist(s)	Ilia Zakharov	Russia	469.40	1	483.20	2
3rd place, bronze medalist(s)	Illya Kvasha	Ukraine	431.35	6	477.20	3
4	Evgeny Kuznetsov	Russia	457.45	5	471.40	4
5	Jack Laugher	Great Britain	460.70	3	471.20	5
6	Matthieu Rosset	France	426.45	7	443.45	6
7	Oleg Kolodiy	Ukraine	414.10	9	435.30	7
8	Stephan Feck	Germany	459.85	4	429.50	8
9	Andrzej Rzeszutek	Poland	421.65	8	406.55	9
10	Jesper Tolvers	Sweden	402.10	12	400.70	10
11	Michele Benedetti	Italy	405.50	11	399.55	11
12	Giovanni Tocci	Italy	406.00	10	365.85	12
13	Yorick de Bruijn	Netherlands	384.45	13		
14	Chris Mears	Great Britain	371.05	14		
15	Stefanos Paparounas	Greece	368.90	15		
16	Antoine Catel	France	365.35	16		
17	Constantin Blaha	Austria	358.15	17		
18	Yauheni Karaliou	Belarus	350.25	18		
19	Chola Chanturia	Georgia	348.80	19		
20	Vinko Paradzik	Sweden	341.90	20		
21	Espen Valheim	Norway	341.10	21		
22	Andrei Pawluk	Belarus	338.20	22		
23	Alberto Arévalo	Spain	318.20	23		
24	Jouni Kallunki	Finland	311.50	24		
25	Fabian Brandl	Austria	310.85	25		
26	Kacper Lesiak	Poland	281.80	26		
27	Botond Bóta	Hungary	240.95	27		
