= 2013 European Diving Championships – Men's synchronized 10 metre platform =

Men's synchronized 10 metre platform at the 2013 European Diving Championships
- Dates: June 22
- Competitors: 12 from 6 nations
- Winning points: 460.44

Medalists
gold medal	Patrick Hausding; Sascha Klein	Germany
silver medal	Victor Minibaev; Artem Chesakov	Russia
bronze medal	Oleksandr Gorshkovozov; Dmytro Mezhenskyi	Ukraine

2013 European Diving Championships
1 m springboard	men		women
3 m springboard	men		women
10 m platform	men		women
Synchronized; 3 m springboard	men		women
Synchronized; 10 m platform	men		women
Team		team

The Men's synchronized 10 metre platform competition at the 2013 European Diving Championships was held on June 22 with a preliminary round and the final.

== Results ==
The preliminary round was held at 12:00 and the final was held at 17:00.

Green denotes finalists

Rank	Diver	Nationality	Preliminary		Final	
Rank	Diver	Nationality	Points	Rank	Points	Rank
1st place, gold medalist(s)	Patrick Hausding; Sascha Klein	Germany	439.11	1	463.20	1
2nd place, silver medalist(s)	Victor Minibaev; Artem Chesakov	Russia	421.11	2	458.76	2
3rd place, bronze medalist(s)	Oleksandr Gorshkovozov; Dmytro Mezhenskyi	Ukraine	414.60	3	436.86	3
4	Maicol Verzotto; Francesco Dell'Uomo	Italy	362.07	5	397.56	4
5	Espen Valheim; Daniel Jensen	Norway	342.84	4	359.61	5
6	Vadim Kaptur; Yauheni Karaliou	Belarus	374.97	6	352.77	6
