= 2013 European Diving Championships – Team event =

Team event at the 2013 European Diving Championships
- Dates: 18 June
- Competitors: 16 from 8 nations
- Winning points: 413.20

Medalists
gold medal	Oleksandr Bondar; Yulia Prokopchuk	Ukraine
silver medal	Davis Gidney; Clare Daley	Germany
bronze medal	Evgeny Kuznetsov; Yulia Koltunova	Russia

2013 European Diving Championships
1 m springboard	men		women
3 m springboard	men		women
10 m platform	men		women
Synchronized; 3 m springboard	men		women
Synchronized; 10 m platform	men		women
Team		team

The team event competition at the 2013 European Diving Championships was held on 18 June with a preliminary round and the final.

== Results ==
The final was held at 17:30.

Rank	Diver	Nationality	Final	
Rank	Diver	Nationality	Points	Rank
1st place, gold medalist(s)	Oleksandr Bondar; Yulia Prokopchuk	Ukraine	413.20	1
2nd place, silver medalist(s)	Sascha Klein; Tina Punzel	Germany	384.00	2
3rd place, bronze medalist(s)	Evgeny Kuznetsov; Yulia Koltunova	Russia	348.10	3
4	Vadim Kaptur; Alena Khamulkina	Belarus	341.55	4
5	Heikki Makikallio; Iira Laatunen	Finland	338.05	5
6	Andrea Chiarabini; Tania Cagnotto	Italy	330.60	6
7	Oliver Dingley; Rebecca Gallantree	Great Britain	327.35	7
8	Laura Marino; Benjamin Auffret	France	305.75	8
