= Diving at the 2016 Summer Olympics – Men's 3 metre springboard =

Men's 3 metre springboard at the Games of the XXXI Olympiad
- Venue: Maria Lenk Aquatic Center
- Date: 15–16 August 2016
- Competitors: 29 from 20 nations
- Winning total: 547.60 points

Medalists
1st place, gold medalist(s)		Cao Yuan	China
2nd place, silver medalist(s)		Jack Laugher	Great Britain
3rd place, bronze medalist(s)		Patrick Hausding	Germany

The men's 3 metre springboard diving competition at the 2016 Summer Olympics in Rio de Janeiro was held on 15 and 16 August at the Maria Lenk Aquatic Center in Barra da Tijuca.

== Format ==
The competition was held in three rounds:

- Preliminary round: All 29 divers perform six dives; the top 18 divers advance to the semi-final.
- Semi-final: The 18 divers perform six dives; the scores of the qualifications are erased and the top 12 divers advance to the final.
- Final: The 12 divers perform six dives; the semi-final scores are erased and the top three divers win the gold, silver and bronze medals accordingly.

== Schedule ==
All times are Brasília time (UTC−3)

Date	Time	Round
Monday, 15 August 2016	15:15	Preliminary
Tuesday, 16 August 2016	10:00; 18:00	Semifinal; Final

== Results ==
Rank	Diver	Nation	Preliminary		Semifinal		Final						
Rank	Diver	Nation	Points	Rank	Points	Rank	Dive 1	Dive 2	Dive 3	Dive 4	Dive 5	Dive 6	Points
1st place, gold medalist(s)	Cao Yuan	China	498.70	1	489.10	1	85.00	94.50	94.50	90.00	86.70	96.90	547.60
2nd place, silver medalist(s)	Jack Laugher	Great Britain	439.95	7	389.40	12	81.60	91.00	90.10	76.05	96.90	88.20	523.85
3rd place, bronze medalist(s)	Patrick Hausding	Germany	440.00	6	413.50	10	63.00	89.25	79.55	83.30	98.80	85.00	498.90
4	Evgeny Kuznetsov	Russia	449.90	4	468.35	3	81.60	76.50	68.25	90.00	70.00	95.00	481.35
5	Kristian Ipsen	United States	461.35	3	437.70	7	72.00	75.00	72.85	89.25	77.00	89.70	475.80
6	Illya Kvasha	Ukraine	398.20	15	430.05	8	71.40	79.05	82.25	93.10	66.00	83.30	475.10
7	Rommel Pacheco	Mexico	488.25	2	469.70	2	45.90	58.50	86.70	79.20	84.00	96.90	451.20
8	Oliver Dingley	Ireland	399.80	13	414.25	9	74.40	81.60	76.50	69.00	61.50	79.90	442.90
9	César Castro	Brazil	398.85	14	442.45	6	72.00	77.50	76.50	70.50	63.00	76.50	436.00
10	Michael Hixon	United States	421.60	10	467.25	4	60.00	81.60	85.75	77.00	62.70	64.60	431.65
11	Philippe Gagne	Canada	400.75	12	445.40	5	72.00	63.55	73.10	71.40	64.75	80.50	425.30
12	Sebastián Morales	Colombia	447.05	5	406.55	11	65.10	76.50	42.00	34.20	70.20	76.50	364.50
13	Michele Benedetti	Italy	390.85	17	387.30	13	Did not advance						
14	Yona Knight-Wisdom	Jamaica	416.55	11	381.40	14	Did not advance						
15	Grant Nel	Australia	395.05	16	368.35	15	Did not advance						
16	Rodrigo Diego	Mexico	430.70	8	356.05	16	Did not advance						
17	Stephan Feck	Germany	423.50	9	354.20	17	Did not advance						
18	Ilya Zakharov	Russia	389.90	18	345.60	18	Did not advance						
19	Freddie Woodward	Great Britain	388.15	19	Did not advance								
20	Ken Terauchi	Japan	380.85	20	Did not advance								
21	He Chao	China	380.35	21	Did not advance								
22	Sho Sakai	Japan	373.70	22	Did not advance								
23	Matthieu Rosset	France	373.40	23	Did not advance								
24	Woo Ha-ram	South Korea	364.10	24	Did not advance								
25	Youssef Ezzat	Egypt	360.95	25	Did not advance								
26	Kevin Chávez	Australia	356.55	26	Did not advance								
27	Constantin Blaha	Austria	351.95	27	Did not advance								
28	Andrea Chiarabini	Italy	350.40	28	Did not advance								
29	Ahmad Amsyar Azman	Malaysia	341.70	29	Did not advance								
