= Diving at the 2012 European Aquatics Championships – Team event =

The team event competition of the diving events at the 2012 European Aquatics Championships was held on 15 May.

== Medalists ==
Gold	Silver	Bronze
Audrey Labeau; Matthieu Rosset; France	Olena Fedorova; Oleksandr Bondar; Ukraine	Nadezhda Bazhina; Artem Chesakov; Russia

== Results ==
The final was held at 19:30.

Rank	Diver	Nationality	Final	
Rank	Diver	Nationality	Points	Rank
1st place, gold medalist(s)	Audrey Labeau; Matthieu Rosset	France	416.50	1
2nd place, silver medalist(s)	Olena Fedorova; Oleksandr Bondar	Ukraine	387.85	2
3rd place, bronze medalist(s)	Nadezda Bazhina; Artem Chesakov	Russia	384.30	3
4	Nora Subschinski; Sascha Klein	Germany	378.35	4
5	Alena Khamulkina; Vadim Kaptur	Belarus	340.30	5
6	Rebecca Gallantree; Thomas Daley	Great Britain	327.90	6
7	Noemi Batki; Michele Benedetti	Italy	325.85	7
8	Cindy Hertogs; Joey van Etten	Netherlands	307.90	8
