= 2016 FINA Diving World Cup =

International diving competition

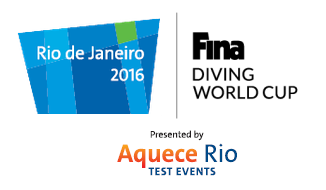
- Host city: Rio de Janeiro, Brazil
- Date: February 19–24, 2016
- Venue: Maria Lenk Aquatic Centre
- Nations: 50
- Athletes: 150
- Website: FINA event page

The 2016 FINA Diving World Cup took place in Rio de Janeiro, Brazil, from 19 to 24 February 2016. It was the 20th edition of the Diving World Cup, and the first time being hosted by Brazil. The venue was the Maria Lenk Aquatic Centre.

The meet served as a test event for the 2016 Olympic Games. The Rio Olympic Games Organising Committee provided mosquito repellent and performed daily cleaning of the venue in response to concerns over the 2015–2016 Zika virus epidemic.

== Participating countries ==
The number beside each nation represents the number of athletes who competed for each country at the 2016 FINA Diving World Cup.

Armenia (2)
Australia (10)
Austria (2)
Belarus (5)
Brazil (11)
Canada (8)
Chile (4)
China (13)
Colombia (5)
Croatia (1)
Cuba (1)
Dominican Republic (1)

Egypt (6)
Spain (3)
Finland (2)
France (4)
Great Britain (11)
Georgia (2)
Germany (9)
Greece (1)
Hungary (3)
Iran (3)
Ireland (2)
Italy (9)

Jamaica (1)
Japan (7)
South Korea (7)
Lithuania (2)
Malaysia (6)
Netherlands (3)
Norway (1)
New Zealand (2)
Puerto Rico (2)
Poland (2)
Romania (2)
South Africa (3)

Russia (10)
New Zealand (2)
Switzerland (2)
Sweden (2)
Chinese Taipei (1)
Ukraine (10)
United States (12)
Uzbekistan (1)
Venezuela (6)
Mexico (11)

== Medal summary ==
As reported by FINA and Omega Timing.

=== Men's events ===
Event	Gold		Silver		Bronze	
3 metre springboard	Rommel Pacheco (MEX)	504.40	Yona Knight-Wisdom (JAM)	459.25	Kristian Ipsen (USA)	457.60
10 metre platform	Qiu Bo (CHN)	557.75	Chen Aisen (CHN)	534.25	David Dinsmore (USA)	497.05
Synchronized; 3 metre springboard	Stephan Feck (GER); Patrick Hausding (GER)	429.33	Cao Yuan (CHN); Qin Kai (CHN)	419.67	Jahir Ocampo (MEX); Rommel Pacheco (MEX)	409.38
Synchronized; 10 metre platform	Chen Aisen (CHN); Lin Yue (CHN)	456.00	Patrick Hausding (GER); Sascha Klein (GER)	448.44	Tom Daley (GBR); Daniel Goodfellow (GBR)	446.40

=== Women's events ===
Event	Gold		Silver		Bronze	
3 metre springboard	Shi Tingmao (CHN)	398.70	He Zi (CHN)	387.90	Jennifer Abel (CAN)	354.45
10 metre platform	Ren Qian (CHN)	454.65	Si Yajie (CHN)	412.80	Melissa Wu (AUS)	380.50
Synchronized; 3 metre springboard	Shi Tingmao (CHN); Wu Minxia (CHN)	339.60	Jennifer Abel (CAN); Pamela Ware (CAN)	312.27	Samantha Amy Mills (AUS); Esther Qin (AUS)	307.50
Synchronized; 10 metre platform	Chen Ruolin (CHN); Liu Huixia (CHN)	344.04	Cheong Jun Hoong (MAS); Pamg Pandelela Rinong (MAS)	318.90	Sarah Barrow (GBR); Tonia Couch (GBR)	308.82

=== Medal table ===
Rank	Nation	Gold	Silver	Bronze	Total
1	China (CHN)	6	4	0	10
2	Germany (GER)	1	1	0	2
3	Mexico (MEX)	1	0	1	2
4	Canada (CAN)	0	1	1	2
5	Jamaica (JAM)	0	1	0	1
5	Malaysia (MAS)	0	1	0	1
7	Australia (AUS)	0	0	2	2
7	Great Britain (GBR)	0	0	2	2
7	United States (USA)	0	0	2	2
Totals (9 entries)		8	8	8	24

Preceded by 2014 FINA Diving World Cup (Shanghai, China)	2016 FINA Diving World Cup (Rio de Janeiro, Brazil)	Succeeded by 2018 FINA Diving World Cup
