= British Diving Championships - synchronised 10 metre platform diving winners =

The British Diving Championships - synchronised 10 metre platform winners are listed below.

The championships were not held in 2021 due to the COVID-19 pandemic.

== Past winners ==
Year	Men's champion	Women's champion	Ref
2006	Callum Johnstone & Gary Hunt	Tonia Couch & Stacie Powell	
2007	Leon Taylor & Peter Waterfield	Tonia Couch & Stacie Powell	
2008	Tom Daley & Blake Aldridge	Monique Gladding & Sarah Barrow	
2009	Jack Clewlow & Max Brick	Carol Galashan & Helen Galashan	
2010	Peter Waterfield & Max Brick	Tonia Couch & Sarah Barrow	
2011	Joe Meszaros & Jack Clewlow	Tonia Couch & Sarah Barrow	
2012	Tom Daley & Peter Waterfield	Tonia Couch & Sarah Barrow	
2013	not contested	Tonia Couch & Sarah Barrow	
2014	not contested	Robyn Birch & Shanice Lobb	
2015	James Denny & Matty Lee	Tonia Couch & Sarah Barrow	
2016	Tom Daley & Daniel Goodfellow	Tonia Couch & Lois Toulson	
2017	Lucas Thomson & James Heatly	Tonia Couch & Lois Toulson	
2018	Matty Lee & Kyle Kothari	Andrea Spendolini-Sirieix & Josie Zillig	
2019	Matthew Dixon & Noah Williams	Emily Martin & Phoebe Banks	
2020	Ben Cutmore & Lucas Thomson	Lois Toulson & Eden Cheng	
2022	Matty Lee & Noah Williams	Emily Martin & Robyn Birch	
2023	not contested	Libby Duke & Ellen Gillespie	
2024	Shane McConnell & Angus Menmuir	Andrea Spendolini-Sirieix & Lois Toulson	
2025	not contested	Maisie Bond & Lois Toulson	
