= 2013 European Diving Championships – Women's 10 metre platform =

Women's 10 metre platform at the 2013 European Diving Championships
- Dates: June 19
- Competitors: 15 from 9 nations
- Winning points: 373.30

Medalists
gold medal	Yulia Prokopchuk	Ukraine
silver medal	Yulia Koltunova	Russia
bronze medal	Maria Kurjo	Germany

2013 European Diving Championships
1 m springboard	men		women
3 m springboard	men		women
10 m platform	men		women
Synchronized; 3 m springboard	men		women
Synchronized; 10 m platform	men		women
Team		team

The women's 10 metre platform competition at the 2013 European Diving Championships was held on June 19 with a preliminary round and the final.

== Results ==
The preliminary round was held at 12:00 and the final was held at 17:30.

Green denotes finalists

Rank	Diver	Nationality	Preliminary		Final	
Rank	Diver	Nationality	Points	Rank	Points	Rank
1st place, gold medalist(s)	Yulia Prokopchuk	Ukraine	359.05	1	373.30	1
2nd place, silver medalist(s)	Yulia Koltunova	Russia	288.95	5	371.10	2
3rd place, bronze medalist(s)	Maria Kurjo	Germany	292.95	4	323.00	3
4	Sarah Barrow	Great Britain	302.75	3	319.25	4
5	Tonia Couch	Great Britain	318.75	2	300.10	5
6	Laura Marino	France	274.45	6	292.25	6
7	Villő Kormos	Hungary	257.40	9	285.25	7
8	Noemi Batki	Italy	260.15	8	284.95	8
9	Kieu Duong	Germany	242.20	12	275.80	9
10	Hanna Krasnoshlyk	Ukraine	270.00	7	268.55	10
11	Zsófia Reisinger	Hungary	253.15	10	264.40	11
12	Iira Laatunen	Finland	251.20	11	252.05	12
13	Brenda Spaziani	Italy	240.75	13		
14	Natalia Goncharova	Russia	227.95	14		
15	Mara Aiacoboae	Romania	216.10	15		
