= 2015 European Diving Championships – Men's synchronized 10 metre platform =

In the men's synchronized 10 metre platform event at the 2015 European Diving Championships, the winning pair were Patrick Hausding and Sascha Klein from Germany.

== Medalists ==
Gold	Silver	Bronze
Patrick Hausding; Sascha Klein; Germany	Roman Izmailov; Victor Minibaev; Russia	Maksym Dolgov; Oleksandr Gorshkovozov; Ukraine

== Results ==
Green denotes finalists

Rank	Diver	Nationality	Preliminary		Final	
Rank	Diver	Nationality	Points	Rank	Points	Rank
1st place, gold medalist(s)	Patrick Hausding; Sascha Klein	Germany	429,30	3	458,10	1
2nd place, silver medalist(s)	Roman Izmailov; Victor Minibaev	Russia	437,55	1	435,84	2
3rd place, bronze medalist(s)	Maksym Dolgov; Oleksandr Gorshkovozov	Ukraine	429,54	2	430,26	3
4	Vadzim Kaptur; Yauheni Karaliou	Belarus	374,22	4	402,18	4
5	James Denny; Matthew Lee	United Kingdom	371,34	5	400,44	5
6	Francesco Dell’Uomo; Maicol Verzotto	Italy	320,52	6	389,28	6
