= Diving at the 2017 World Aquatics Championships – Men's synchronized 10 metre platform =

Synchronized diving event

Men's synchronized 10 metre platform at the 2017 World Aquatics Championships
- Venue: Danube Arena
- Location: Budapest, Hungary
- Dates: 17 July
- Competitors: 26 from 13 nations
- Teams: 13
- Winning points: 498.48

Medalists
| gold medal | Chen Aisen; Yang Hao | China |
| silver medal | Aleksandr Bondar; Viktor Minibaev | Russia |
| bronze medal | Patrick Hausding; Sascha Klein | Germany |

The Men's synchronized 10 metre platform competition at the 2017 World Championships was held on 17 July 2017.

== Results ==
The preliminary round was started at 13:00. The final was held at 18:30.

Green denotes finalists

| Rank | Nation | Divers | Preliminary | | Final | |
| Rank | Nation | Divers | Points | Rank | Points | Rank |
|---|---|---|---|---|---|---|
| 1st place, gold medalist(s) | China | Chen Aisen; Yang Hao | 466.44 | 1 | 498.48 | 1 |
| 2nd place, silver medalist(s) | Russia | Aleksandr Bondar; Viktor Minibaev | 415.02 | 4 | 458.85 | 2 |
| 3rd place, bronze medalist(s) | Germany | Patrick Hausding; Sascha Klein | 412.92 | 5 | 440.82 | 3 |
| 4 | Great Britain | Tom Daley; Daniel Goodfellow | 433.14 | 2 | 418.02 | 4 |
| 5 | Ukraine | Maksym Dolhov; Oleksandr Horshkovozov | 419.01 | 3 | 416.31 | 5 |
| 6 | United States | Steele Johnson; Brandon Loschiavo | 406.53 | 8 | 406.83 | 6 |
| 7 | South Korea | Kim Yeong-nam; Woo Ha-ram | 378.36 | 10 | 391.17 | 7 |
| 8 | Australia | Domonic Bedggood; Declan Stacey | 388.20 | 9 | 387.30 | 8 |
| 9 | Armenia | Vladimir Harutyunyan; Lev Sargsyan | 368.40 | 11 | 385.20 | 9 |
| 10 | Mexico | José Balleza; Kevin Berlín | 411.72 | 6 | 378.48 | 10 |
| 11 | North Korea | Hyon Il-myong; Ri Hyon-ju | 409.95 | 7 | 372.24 | 11 |
| 12 | Belarus | Artsiom Barouski; Vadim Kaptur | 361.83 | 12 | 362.04 | 12 |
| 13 | Colombia | Kevin García; Víctor Ortega | 333.96 | 13 | did not advance | |
