= Diving at the 2014 European Aquatics Championships – Men's 10 m synchro platform =

Men's 10 m synchro platform at the Diving at the 2014 European Aquatics Championships
- Dates: 20 August
- Competitors: 10 from 5 nations
- Winning points: 461.46

Medalists
gold medal	Patrick Hausding; Sascha Klein	Germany
silver medal	Vadim Kaptur; Yauheni Karaliou	Belarus
bronze medal	Oleksandr Bondar; Maksym Dolgov	Ukraine

The Men's 10 m synchro platform competition of the 2014 European Aquatics Championships was held on 20 August.

== Results ==
The preliminary round was held at 12:00 and the final at 16:00.

Rank	Diver	Nationality	Preliminary		Final	
Rank	Diver	Nationality	Points	Rank	Points	Rank
1st place, gold medalist(s)	Patrick Hausding; Sascha Klein	Germany	420.48	1	461.46	1
2nd place, silver medalist(s)	Vadim Kaptur; Yauheni Karaliou	Belarus	384.66	3	421.80	2
3rd place, bronze medalist(s)	Oleksandr Bondar; Maksym Dolgov	Ukraine	366.84	4	415.17	3
4	Tom Daley; James Denny	Great Britain	415.05	2	403.74	4
5	Francesco Dell'Uomo; Maicol Verzotto	Italy	352.38	5	386.76	5
