= 2013 European Diving Championships – Women's 1 metre springboard =

Women's 1 m springboard at the 2013 European Diving Championships
- Dates: June 21
- Competitors: 21 from 13 nations
- Winning points: 301.20

Medalists
gold medal	Tania Cagnotto	Italy
silver medal	Nadezhda Bazhina	Russia
bronze medal	Maria Polyakova	Russia

2013 European Diving Championships
1 m springboard	men		women
3 m springboard	men		women
10 m platform	men		women
Synchronized; 3 m springboard	men		women
Synchronized; 10 m platform	men		women
Team		team

The women's 1 m springboard competition at the 2013 European Diving Championships was held on June 21 with a preliminary round and the final.

== Results ==
The preliminary round was held at 09:00 and the final was held at 15:30.

Green denotes finalists

Rank	Diver	Nationality	Preliminary		Final	
Rank	Diver	Nationality	Points	Rank	Points	Rank
1st place, gold medalist(s)	Tania Cagnotto	Italy	276.10	1	301.20	1
2nd place, silver medalist(s)	Nadezhda Bazhina	Russia	261.30	2	274.35	2
3rd place, bronze medalist(s)	Maria Polyakova	Russia	244.40	5	273.90	3
4	Olena Fedorova	Ukraine	244.20	6	267.00	4
5	Anastasiia Nedobiga	Ukraine	237.70	7	261.80	5
6	Maria Marconi	Italy	253.30	4	261.15	6
7	Tina Punzel	Germany	226.35	11	258.95	7
8	Rebecca Gallantree	Great Britain	235.45	9	248.40	8
9	Inge Jansen	Netherlands	236.05	8	231.75	9
10	Sophie Somloi	Austria	230.10	10	228.20	10
11	Alicia Blagg	Great Britain	259.60	3	227.30	11
12	Maxine Eouzan	France	221.95	12	214.05	12
13	Celine van Duijn	Netherlands	220.20	13		
14	Fanny Bouvet	France	217.45	14		
15	Tiia Kivela	Finland	215.25	15		
16	Taina Karvonen	Finland	211.05	16		
17	Daniella Nero	Sweden	207.50	17		
18	Friederike Freyer	Germany	205.55	18		
19	Alena Khamulkina	Belarus	204.85	19		
20	Patrycja Pyrzak	Poland	173.55	20		
21	Anna Bogyay	Hungary	168.00	21		
