= 2013 European Diving Championships – Women's synchronized 10 metre platform =

Women's synchronized 10 metre platform at the 2013 European Diving Championships
- Dates: June 20
- Competitors: 5 from 10 nations
- Winning points: 315.66

Medalists
gold medal	Yulia Koltunova; Natalia Goncharova	Russia
silver medal	Tonia Couch; Sarah Barrow	Great Britain
bronze medal	Maria Kurjo; Julia Stolle	Germany

2013 European Diving Championships
1 m springboard	men		women
3 m springboard	men		women
10 m platform	men		women
Synchronized; 3 m springboard	men		women
Synchronized; 10 m platform	men		women
Team		team

The women's synchronized 10 metre platform competition at the 2013 European Diving Championships was held on June 20 with a preliminary round and the final.

== Results ==
The preliminary round was held at 12:00 and the final was held at 17:30.

Green denotes finalists

Rank	Diver	Nationality	Preliminary		Final	
Rank	Diver	Nationality	Points	Rank	Points	Rank
1st place, gold medalist(s)	Yulia Koltunova; Natalia Goncharova	Russia	293.52	2	315.66	1
2nd place, silver medalist(s)	Tonia Couch; Sarah Barrow	Great Britain	301.32	1	306.24	2
3rd place, bronze medalist(s)	Maria Kurjo; Julia Stolle	Germany	275.883	5	299.16	3
4	Viktoriya Potyekhina; Yulia Prokopchuk	Ukraine	268.80	4	294.42	4
5	Villő Kormos; Zsófia Reisinger	Hungary	253.80	5	266.64	5
