= 2013 European Diving Championships – Women's 3 metre synchro springboard =

Women's 3 metre synchro springboard at the 2013 European Diving Championships
- Dates: June 23
- Competitors: 18 from 9 nations
- Winning points: 324.30

Medalists
gold medal	Tania Cagnotto; Francesca Dallapé	Italy
silver medal	Hanna Pysmenska; Olena Fedorova	Ukraine
bronze medal	Rebecca Gallantree; Alicia Blagg	Great Britain

2013 European Diving Championships
1 m springboard	men		women
3 m springboard	men		women
10 m platform	men		women
Synchronized; 3 m springboard	men		women
Synchronized; 10 m platform	men		women
Team		team

The women's 3 metre synchro springboard competition at the 2013 European Diving Championships was held on June 23 with a preliminary round and the final.

== Results ==
The preliminary round was held at 09:00 and the final was held at 14:30.

Green denotes finalists

Rank	Diver	Nationality	Preliminary		Final	
Rank	Diver	Nationality	Points	Rank	Points	Rank
1st place, gold medalist(s)	Tania Cagnotto; Francesca Dallapé	Italy	300.90	2	324.30	1
2nd place, silver medalist(s)	Hanna Pysmenska; Olena Fedorova	Ukraine	301.20	1	300.60	2
3rd place, bronze medalist(s)	Rebecca Gallantree; Alicia Blagg	Great Britain	291.90	3	292.17	3
4	Kieu Duong; Tina Punzel	Germany	276.30	5	291.00	4
5	Maria Polyakova; Kristina Ilinykh	Russia	281.10	4	282.30	5
6	Inge Jansen; Celine van Duijn	Netherlands	271.80	6	277.50	6
7	Flóra Gondos; Zsófia Reisinger	Hungary	254.40	8	259.98	7
8	Taina Karvonen; Iira Laatunen	Finland	261.03	7	258.45	8
9	Eleni Katsouli; Ioulianna Banousi	Greece	222.51	9		
