= 2019 European Diving Championships – Men's 1 metre springboard =

Men's 1 metre springboard event at the 2019 European Diving Championships was contested on 7 August.

== Results ==
30 athletes participated at the event; the best 12 from the preliminary round qualified for the final.

=== Preliminary round ===
| Rank | Diver | Nationality | D1 | D2 | D3 | D4 | D5 | D6 | Total |
|---|---|---|---|---|---|---|---|---|---|
| 1 | Lorenzo Marsaglia | Italy | 68.20 | 55.50 | 55.50 | 55.50 | 67.50 | 57.60 | 359.80 |
| 2 | Stanislav Oliferchyk | Ukraine | 66.65 | 54.00 | 54.00 | 58.50 | 51.00 | 60.80 | 344.95 |
| 3 | Kacper Lesiak | Poland | 51.15 | 63.00 | 60.00 | 63.00 | 57.20 | 46.40 | 340.75 |
| 4 | Patrick Hausding | Germany | 65.10 | 64.00 | 52.80 | 43.50 | 58.50 | 52.80 | 336.70 |
| 5 | Oleg Kolodiy | Ukraine | 51.15 | 62.70 | 49.50 | 54.00 | 57.60 | 55.90 | 330.85 |
| 6 | Guillaume Dutoit | France | 52.70 | 55.90 | 58.50 | 51.00 | 49.50 | 59.20 | 326.80 |
| 7 | Jordan Houlden | Great Britain | 51.15 | 63.00 | 55.80 | 57.00 | 63.00 | 52.80 | 325.95 |
| 8 | Vinko Paradzik | Sweden | 51.15 | 61.50 | 55.80 | 57.00 | 49.50 | 49.50 | 324.45 |
| 9 | Jonathan Suckow | Switzerland | 44.85 | 54.25 | 43.50 | 61.50 | 58.50 | 60.80 | 323.40 |
| 10 | Giovanni Tocci | Italy | 54.60 | 33.60 | 51.00 | 52.50 | 66.00 | 60.45 | 318.15 |
| 11 | Ilia Molchanov | Russia | 64.50 | 58.90 | 40.50 | 46.50 | 43.20 | 63.00 | 316.60 |
| 12 | Alexis Jandard | France | 60.45 | 55.50 | 54.40 | 55.00 | 42.00 | 49.50 | 306.85 |
| 13 | Dylan Vork | Netherlands | 51.15 | 54.60 | 54.00 | 40.50 | 52.50 | 49.60 | 302.35 |
| 14 | Oliver Dingley | Ireland | 62.40 | 36.00 | 49.50 | 36.00 | 50.40 | 65.10 | 299.40 |
| 15 | Juraj Melša | Croatia | 48.10 | 52.70 | 45.00 | 49.50 | 58.50 | 45.00 | 298.80 |
| 16 | Anthony Harding | Great Britain | 58.50 | 49.60 | 46.50 | 45.00 | 49.40 | 49.50 | 298.50 |
| 17 | Denis Kliukin | Russia | 53.30 | 60.45 | 23.10 | 48.00 | 54.40 | 54.00 | 293.25 |
| 18 | Gwendal Bisch | France | 55.80 | 54.00 | 57.60 | 48.00 | 30.00 | 43.50 | 288.90 |
| 19 | Andrzej Rzeszutek | Poland | 60.90 | 39.10 | 52.50 | 39.00 | 49.50 | 46.40 | 287.40 |
| 20 | Frithjof Seidel | Germany | 56.55 | 52.50 | 51.20 | 39.00 | 40.80 | 46.50 | 286.55 |
| 21 | Alexandr Molchan | Belarus | 50.40 | 50.70 | 44.95 | 40.50 | 54.00 | 40.30 | 280.85 |
| 22 | Adrían Abadía | Spain | 50.40 | 37.20 | 46.80 | 41.40 | 51.00 | 54.00 | 280.80 |
| 23 | Dariush Lotfi | Austria | 46.50 | 51.00 | 55.50 | 31.50 | 46.50 | 49.40 | 280.40 |
| 24 | Nikolaj Schaller | Austria | 50.70 | 42.90 | 48.05 | 42.00 | 44.85 | 48.00 | 276.50 |
| 25 | Dimitar Isaev | Bulgaria | 48.00 | 40.25 | 45.00 | 50.70 | 36.40 | 44.20 | 264.55 |
| 26 | Yury Naurozau | Belarus | 41.85 | 21.00 | 40.50 | 57.00 | 49.50 | 48.00 | 257.85 |
| 27 | Alberto Arévalo | Spain | 29.45 | 54.00 | 52.80 | 31.50 | 33.00 | 50.70 | 251.45 |
| 28 | Juho Junttila | Finland | 52.00 | 46.80 | 38.40 | 27.00 | 33.35 | 40.30 | 237.85 |
| 29 | Pascal Faatz | Netherlands | 49.20 | 48.05 | 48.10 | 13.50 | 37.50 | 40.50 | 236.85 |
| 30 | Alexander Kostov | Bulgaria | 42.90 | 34.50 | 46.50 | 42.00 | 32.00 | 37.50 | 235.40 |

=== Final ===
| Rank | Diver | Nationality | D1 | D2 | D3 | D4 | D5 | D6 | Total |
|---|---|---|---|---|---|---|---|---|---|
| 1st place, gold medalist(s) | Patrick Hausding | Germany | 65.10 | 67.20 | 64.35 | 61.50 | 55.50 | 75.20 | 388.85 |
| 2nd place, silver medalist(s) | Oleg Kolodiy | Ukraine | 68.20 | 59.40 | 63.00 | 63.00 | 72.00 | 55.90 | 381.50 |
| 3rd place, bronze medalist(s) | Lorenzo Marsaglia | Italy | 66.65 | 67.50 | 54.00 | 58.50 | 61.50 | 72.00 | 380.15 |
| 4 | Jordan Houlden | Great Britain | 65.10 | 66.00 | 63.00 | 51.00 | 67.50 | 67.20 | 379.80 |
| 5 | Kacper Lesiak | Poland | 69.75 | 63.00 | 58.50 | 63.00 | 58.50 | 59.20 | 371.95 |
| 6 | Ilia Molchanov | Russia | 66.00 | 62.00 | 55.50 | 67.50 | 62.40 | 68.50 | 371.90 |
| 7 | Jonathan Suckow | Switzerland | 47.15 | 51.15 | 55.50 | 61.50 | 69.00 | 62.40 | 346.70 |
| 8 | Alexis Jandard | France | 60.45 | 58.50 | 57.60 | 46.50 | 63.00 | 58.50 | 344.55 |
| 9 | Vinko Paradzik | Sweden | 55.80 | 61.50 | 63.55 | 55.50 | 54.00 | 52.50 | 342.85 |
| 10 | Giovanni Tocci | Italy | 62.40 | 60.80 | 45.00 | 39.00 | 64.50 | 58.90 | 330.60 |
| 11 | Stanislav Oliferchyk | Ukraine | 57.35 | 64.50 | 45.00 | 39.00 | 54.00 | 62.40 | 322.25 |
| 12 | Guillaume Dutoit | France | 55.80 | 55.90 | 44.55 | 33.00 | 40.50 | 60.80 | 290.55 |
