= 2013 European Diving Championships – Women's 3 metre springboard =

Women's 3 m springboard at the 2013 European Diving Championships
- Dates: June 22
- Competitors: 21 from 13 nations
- Winning points: 336.70

Medalists
gold medal	Tina Punzel	Germany
silver medal	Tania Cagnotto	Italy
bronze medal	Nadezhda Bazhina	Russia

2013 European Diving Championships
1 m springboard	men		women
3 m springboard	men		women
10 m platform	men		women
Synchronized; 3 m springboard	men		women
Synchronized; 10 m platform	men		women
Team		team

The women's 3 m springboard competition at the 2013 European Diving Championships was held on June 22 with a preliminary round and final.

== Results ==
The preliminary round was held at 09:00 and the final was held at 14:30.

Green denotes finalists

Rank	Diver	Nationality	Preliminary		Final	
Rank	Diver	Nationality	Points	Rank	Points	Rank
1st place, gold medalist(s)	Tina Punzel	Germany	269.70	7	336.70	1
2nd place, silver medalist(s)	Tania Cagnotto	Italy	322.35	1	331.85	2
3rd place, bronze medalist(s)	Nadezhda Bazhina	Russia	318.35	2	326.10	3
4	Maria Marconi	Italy	261.75	10	314.50	4
5	Hanna Pysmenska	Ukraine	246.00	12	301.95	5
6	Olena Fedorova	Ukraine	282.30	5	288.35	6
7	Hannah Starling	Great Britain	288.35	4	288.30	7
8	Alicia Blagg	Great Britain	290.10	3	286.80	8
9	Alena Khamulkina	Belarus	271.70	6	249.80	9
10	Sophie Somloi	Austria	268.65	8	227.35	10
11	Inge Jansen	Netherlands	264.80	9	213.70	11
12	Taina Karvonen	Finland	248.45	11	204.40	12
13	Daniella Nero	Sweden	244.00	13		
14	Flóra Gondos	Hungary	239.90	14		
15	Tiia Kivela	Finland	223.50	15		
16	Kristina Ilinykh	Russia	214.25	16		
17	Ioulianna Banousi	Greece	211.75	17		
18	Celine van Duijn	Netherlands	202.30	18		
19	Patrycja Pyrzak	Poland	190.70	19		
20	Eleni Katsouli	Greece	169.65	20		
21	Friederike Freyer	Germany	161.85	21		
