= 2019 European Diving Championships – Men's 3 metre springboard =

Men's 3 metre springboard event at the 2019 European Diving Championships was contested on 9 August.

== Results ==
32 athletes participated at the event; the best 12 from the preliminary round qualified for the final.

=== Preliminary round ===
| Rank | Diver | Nationality | D1 | D2 | D3 | D4 | D5 | D6 | Total |
|---|---|---|---|---|---|---|---|---|---|
| 1 | Nikita Shleikher | Russia | 57.80 | 75.25 | 66.60 | 74.10 | 73.50 | 76.05 | 423.30 |
| 2 | Lorenzo Marsaglia | Italy | 68.20 | 69.70 | 59.40 | 63.00 | 76.50 | 79.80 | 416.60 |
| 3 | James Heatly | Great Britain | 67.50 | 73.10 | 78.75 | 74.10 | 54.25 | 61.20 | 408.90 |
| 4 | Patrick Hausding | Germany | 57.00 | 77.00 | 70.00 | 71.40 | 58.90 | 64.60 | 398.90 |
| 5 | Oliver Dingley | Ireland | 71.40 | 57.00 | 78.75 | 63.00 | 72.20 | 56.10 | 398.45 |
| 6 | Martin Wolfram | Germany | 61.50 | 64.75 | 77.00 | 61.20 | 65.10 | 68.00 | 397.55 |
| 7 | Evgeny Kuznetsov | Russia | 74.80 | 69.30 | 74.80 | 63.00 | 61.25 | 51.30 | 394.45 |
| 8 | Oleg Kolodiy | Ukraine | 66.30 | 57.00 | 62.70 | 78.75 | 62.70 | 62.90 | 390.35 |
| 9 | Giovanni Tocci | Italy | 67.50 | 63.55 | 64.60 | 66.00 | 40.25 | 66.30 | 368.20 |
| 10 | Gwendal Bisch | France | 66.65 | 57.80 | 49.50 | 61.25 | 71.75 | 61.20 | 368.15 |
| 11 | Ross Haslam | Great Britain | 63.00 | 43.75 | 66.30 | 61.20 | 64.60 | 66.50 | 365.35 |
| 12 | Jonathan Sucknow | Switzerland | 67.50 | 69.75 | 55.50 | 40.50 | 64.75 | 66.30 | 364.30 |
| 13 | Alexis Jandard | France | 60.00 | 60.45 | 78.20 | 57.00 | 43.75 | 57.75 | 357.15 |
| 14 | Kacper Lesiak | Poland | 55.80 | 69.70 | 63.00 | 61.50 | 61.20 | 45.60 | 356.80 |
| 15 | Guillaume Dutoit | France | 58.50 | 62.00 | 49.40 | 64.50 | 54.25 | 66.30 | 354.95 |
| 16 | Oleksandr Gorshkovozov | Ukraine | 66.30 | 72.00 | 66.30 | 43.75 | 45.90 | 51.30 | 345.55 |
| 17 | Nicolás García Boissier | Spain | 63.00 | 61.25 | 33.25 | 74.80 | 54.00 | 55.80 | 342.10 |
| 18 | Adrián Abadía | Spain | 63.00 | 54.40 | 51.15 | 63.00 | 49.50 | 56.55 | 337.60 |
| 19 | Alexander Hart | Austria | 58.50 | 57.00 | 60.45 | 54.00 | 40.50 | 56.10 | 326.55 |
| 20 | Nikolaj Schaller | Austria | 52.50 | 54.00 | 58.90 | 62.90 | 45.00 | 49.50 | 322.80 |
| 21 | Vartan Bayanduryan | Armenia | 51.15 | 52.50 | 54.00 | 51.00 | 56.10 | 57.00 | 321.75 |
| 22 | Juho Junttila | Finland | 57.00 | 34.50 | 52.50 | 54.25 | 59.50 | 45.00 | 302.75 |
| 23 | Yury Naurozau | Belarus | 54.00 | 55.80 | 61.20 | 54.40 | 33.00 | 43.50 | 301.90 |
| 24 | Juraj Melša | Croatia | 55.50 | 54.00 | 57.35 | 42.00 | 51.00 | 29.75 | 289.60 |
| 25 | Pascal Faatz | Netherlands | 45.00 | 57.00 | 43.40 | 37.50 | 60.00 | 46.40 | 289.30 |
| 26 | Tornike Onikashvili | Georgia | 50.40 | 49.50 | 58.90 | 52.50 | 36.00 | 25.50 | 272.80 |
| 27 | Sandro Melikidze | Georgia | 54.00 | 54.00 | 62.00 | 56.10 | 18.00 | 27.00 | 271.10 |
| 28 | Dylan Vork | Netherlands | 58.50 | 46.50 | 36.00 | 41.85 | 27.00 | 56.10 | 265.95 |
| 29 | Pavel Saurytski | Belarus | 57.00 | 35.70 | 42.00 | 45.00 | 37.50 | 43.40 | 260.60 |
| 30 | Dimitar Isaev | Bulgaria | 39.00 | 40.30 | 36.00 | 25.50 | 45.00 | 56.55 | 242.35 |
| 31 | Alexander Kostov | Bulgaria | 54.00 | 36.00 | 23.25 | 40.50 | 45.00 | 40.80 | 239.55 |
| 32 | Andrzej Rzeszutek | Poland | 51.00 | 40.80 | 26.60 | 42.00 | 45.00 | 33.25 | 238.65 |

=== Final ===
| Rank | Diver | Nationality | D1 | D2 | D3 | D4 | D5 | D6 | Total |
|---|---|---|---|---|---|---|---|---|---|
| 1st place, gold medalist(s) | Evgeny Kuznetsov | Russia | 79.90 | 79.20 | 79.90 | 81.00 | 78.75 | 100.70 | 499.45 |
| 2nd place, silver medalist(s) | Patrick Hausding | Germany | 61.50 | 77.00 | 78.75 | 78.20 | 79.80 | 81.60 | 456.85 |
| 3rd place, bronze medalist(s) | James Heatly | Great Britain | 67.50 | 76.50 | 73.50 | 91.20 | 70.00 | 61.20 | 439.90 |
| 4 | Nikita Shleikher | Russia | 64.60 | 78.75 | 55.80 | 45.60 | 80.50 | 91.65 | 416.90 |
| 5 | Ross Haslam | Great Britain | 72.00 | 70.00 | 73.10 | 66.30 | 64.60 | 68.25 | 414.25 |
| 6 | Oleg Kolodiy | Ukraine | 44.20 | 72.00 | 47.85 | 84.00 | 93.10 | 61.20 | 402.35 |
| 7 | Jonathan Sucknow | Switzerland | 67.50 | 66.65 | 66.00 | 58.50 | 59.50 | 71.40 | 389.55 |
| 8 | Lorenzo Marsaglia | Italy | 74.40 | 71.40 | 64.80 | 66.50 | 57.80 | 51.30 | 386.20 |
| 9 | Oliver Dingley | Ireland | 69.70 | 64.50 | 80.50 | 51.00 | 41.80 | 71.40 | 378.90 |
| 10 | Giovanni Tocci | Italy | 67.50 | 62.00 | 74.80 | 63.00 | 31.50 | 68.00 | 366.80 |
| 11 | Gwendal Bisch | France | 66.65 | 52.70 | 57.00 | 42.00 | 57.75 | 62.90 | 339.00 |
| 12 | Martin Wolfram | Germany | 64.50 | 66.50 | 31.50 | 45.90 | 49.40 | 79.90 | 337.70 |
