= 2017 European Diving Championships – Men's 1 metre springboard =

== Results ==
Green denotes finalists

| Rank | Diver | Nationality | Preliminary | | Final | |
| Rank | Diver | Nationality | Points | Rank | Points | Rank |
|---|---|---|---|---|---|---|
| 1st place, gold medalist(s) | Illya Kvasha | Ukraine | 403.25 | 2 | 431.75 | 1 |
| 2nd place, silver medalist(s) | Patrick Hausding | Germany | 397.80 | 3 | 419.80 | 2 |
| 3rd place, bronze medalist(s) | Matthieu Rosset | France | 414.45 | 1 | 412.95 | 3 |
| 4 | Oleg Kolodiy | Ukraine | 373.80 | 5 | 391.10 | 4 |
| 5 | Giovanni Tocci | Italy | 386.70 | 4 | 376.95 | 5 |
| 6 | Guillaume Dutoit | Switzerland | 346.20 | 10 | 370.85 | 6 |
| 7 | Stephan Feck | Germany | 372.10 | 6 | 367.70 | 7 |
| 8 | Sergei Nazin | Russia | 346.30 | 9 | 367.45 | 8 |
| 9 | Andrzej Rzeszutek | Poland | 356.20 | 8 | 351.95 | 9 |
| 10 | Mikita Tkachou | Belarus | 343.50 | 11 | 340.25 | 10 |
| 11 | Freddie Woodward | Great Britain | 359.05 | 7 | 330.20 | 11 |
| 12 | Tommaso Rinaldi | Italy | 335.45 | 12 | 316.45 | 12 |
| 13 | Jonathan Suckow | Switzerland | 332.85 | 13 | | |
| 14 | Constantin Blaha | Austria | 330.95 | 14 | | |
| 15 | Nicolás García Boissier | Spain | 325.75 | 15 | | |
| 16 | Joey van Etten | Netherlands | 322.65 | 16 | | |
| 17 | Kacper Lesiak | Poland | 319.65 | 17 | | |
| 18 | Ilya Molchanov | Russia | 318.55 | 18 | | |
| 19 | Antoine Catel | France | 317.55 | 19 | | |
| 20 | Alberto Arévalo Alcón | Spain | 307.55 | 20 | | |
| 21 | Fabian Brandl | Austria | 297.40 | 21 | | |
| 22 | Alexander Kostov | Bulgaria | 295.75 | 22 | | |
| 23 | Botond Bóta | Hungary | 295.45 | 23 | | |
| 24 | Juho Junttila | Finland | 291.20 | 24 | | |
| 25 | Nikita Kozlovskis | Latvia | 286.55 | 25 | | |
| 26 | Jack Ffrench | Ireland | 281.80 | 26 | | |
| 27 | Ross Haslam | Great Britain | 277.35 | 27 | | |
| 28 | Dimitar Isaev | Bulgaria | 274.55 | 28 | | |
| 29 | Juraj Melsa | Croatia | 267.00 | 29 | | |
| 30 | Jouni Kallunki | Finland | 243.30 | 30 | | |
| 31 | Ábel Ligárt | Hungary | 221.15 | 31 | | |
