= 2011 European Diving Championships =

Water sport competitions

- Host city: Turin
- Country: Italy
- Nations: 22
- Athletes: 103
- Events: 11
- Dates: 8 March 2011– 13 March 2011
- Main venue: Monumentale Pool
- Website: www.torino2011.len.eu

The 2011 European Diving Championships was the secondedition of the European Diving Championships and took part from 8–13 March 2011 in Turin, Italy. For the second time, the event was held separately from the European Swimming Championships. The event was held on Monumentale Diving Stadium. The former capital of Italy was hosting European Diving Championships for the third time after 1954 and 2009. The 2011 Championships were also an event within the frame of the 150-year celebrations of the unification of Italy. A total of ten disciplines was on the schedule. Additionally, there was a team event on the first day of competition.

== Events ==
Date	Event
8. March	Opening Ceremony
8. March	Team Event
9. March	1 m springboard - men
9. March	10 m platform - women
10. March	3 m springboard - men
10. March	10 m platform synchro - women
11. March	3 m springboard synchro - men
11. March	1 m springboard - women
12. March	10 m platform synchro - men
12. March	3 m springboard - women
13. March	10 m platform - men
13. March	3 m springboard synchro - women

== Results ==
=== Men ===
Event	Gold		Silver		Bronze	
1 m springboard	Evgeny Kuznetsov; Russia	427.05	Illya Kvasha; Ukraine	419.65	Matthieu Rosset; France	412.15
3 m springboard	Patrick Hausding; Germany	499.40	Ilya Zakharov; Russia	493.85	Evgeny Kuznetsov; Russia	482.35
3 m springboard synchro	Russia; Evgeny Kuznetsov; Ilya Zakharov	454.68	Germany; Patrick Hausding; Stephan Feck	441.45	France; Matthieu Rosset; Damien Cely	425.37
10 m platform	Sascha Klein; Germany	515.05	Patrick Hausding; Germany	506.10	Oleksandr Bondar; Ukraine	493.95
10 m platform synchro	Germany; Sascha Klein; Patrick Hausding	467.16	Ukraine; Oleksandr Bondar; Oleksandr Gorshkovozov	458.34	Russia; Victor Minibaev; Ilya Zakharov	441.15

=== Women ===
Event	Gold		Silver		Bronze	
1 m springboard	Tania Cagnotto; Italy	312.05	Nadezhda Bazhina; Russia	288.75	Anna Lindberg; Sweden	287.80
3 m springboard	Anna Lindberg; Sweden	347.10	Nadezhda Bazhina; Russia	325.55	Tania Cagnotto; Italy	324.25
3 m springboard synchro	Italy; Tania Cagnotto; Francesca Dallapè	320.40	Russia; Nadezhda Bazhina; Svetlana Filippova	317.13	Germany; Katja Dieckow; Uschi Freitag	295.50
10 m platform	Noemi Batki; Italy	346.35	Yulia Koltunova; Russia	327.30	Maria Kurjo; Germany	318.45
10 m platform synchro	Russia; Yulia Koltunova; Daria Govor	322.26	Germany; Nora Subschinski; Christin Steuer	317.76	Ukraine; Iuliia Prokopchuk; Alina Chaplenko	315.24

=== Mixed ===
Event	Gold		Silver		Bronze	
Team Event	Russia; Yulia Koltunova; Ilya Zakharov	411.00	France; Audrey Labeau; Matthieu Rosset	408.60	Ukraine; Olena Fedorova; Oleksandr Gorshkovozov	358.40

== Medal table ==
Rank	Nation	Gold	Silver	Bronze	Total
1	Russia (RUS)	4	5	2	11
2	Germany (DEU)	3	3	2	8
3	Italy (ITA)	3	0	1	4
4	Sweden (SWE)	1	0	1	2
5	Ukraine (UKR)	0	2	3	5
6	France (FRA)	0	1	2	3
Totals (6 entries)		11	11	11	33

== Participating nations ==
103 athletes from 22 nations competed.

- Austria (1)
- Belarus (5)
- Croatia (1)
- Finland (3)
- France (5)
- Georgia (3)
- Germany (10)
- Greece (4)
- Hungary (6)
- Italy (12)
- Lithuania (2)
- Netherlands (3)
- Norway (3)
- Poland (3)
- Romania (3)
- Russia (11)
- Serbia (1)
- Spain (2)
- Switzerland (3)
- Sweden (6)
- Ukraine (9)
- Great Britain (9)
