= Diving at the 2014 European Aquatics Championships – Men's 3 m synchro springboard =

Men's 3 m synchro springboard at the Diving at the 2014 European Aquatics Championships
- Dates: 22 August
- Competitors: 18 from 9 nations
- Winning points: 464.64

Medalists
gold medal	Ilya Zakharov; Evgeny Kuznetsov	Russia
silver medal	Patrick Hausding; Stephan Feck	Germany
bronze medal	Oleksandr Gorshkovozov; Illya Kvasha	Ukraine

The Men's 3 m synchro springboard competition of the 2014 European Aquatics Championships was held on 22 August.

== Results ==
The preliminary round was held at 12:00 and the final at 16:00.

Green denotes finalists

Rank	Diver	Nationality	Preliminary		Final	
Rank	Diver	Nationality	Points	Rank	Points	Rank
1st place, gold medalist(s)	Ilya Zakharov; Evgeny Kuznetsov	Russia	436.41	1	464.64	1
2nd place, silver medalist(s)	Patrick Hausding; Stephan Feck	Germany	413.97	2	438.15	2
3rd place, bronze medalist(s)	Oleksandr Gorshkovozov; Illya Kvasha	Ukraine	408.39	3	433.98	3
4	Michele Benedetti; Giovanni Tocci	Italy	386.04	5	400.59	4
5	Chris Mears; Jack Laugher	Great Britain	399.15	4	391.98	5
6	Constantin Blaha; Fabian Brandl	Austria	365.28	8	383.19	6
7	Andrzej Rzeszutek; Kacper Lesiak	Poland	372.39	6	381.36	7
8	Stefanos Paparounas; Michail Fafalis	Greece	368.01	7	368.37	8
9	Andrei Pawluk; Yauheni Karaliou	Belarus	363.39	9		
