= Alina Chaplenko =

Ukrainian diver (born 1993)

Personal information
- Native name: Чапленко Аліна Юріївна
- Born: 26 January 1993 (age 33) Zaporizhzhia, Ukraine

Sport
- Country: Ukraine
- Sport: Diving
- Partner: Yulia Prokopchuk
Medal record
Women's diving
Representing Ukraine
European Aquatics Championships
Silver medal – second place	2008 Eindhoven	10 m synchro
Silver medal – second place	2010 Budapest	10 m synchro
European Diving Championships
Bronze medal – third place	2011 Turin	10 m synchro
European Junior Championships
Gold medal – first place	2008 Minsk	10 m platform
Bronze medal – third place	2008 Minsk	3 m springboard

Alina Iuriivna Chaplenko (Ukrainian: Аліна Юріївна Чапленко; born 26 January 1993) is a Ukrainian diver.

== Career ==
Chaplenko was born in Zaporizhzhia, Ukraine. At the beginning of her diving career, she won gold and bronze medals in the 10m platform and the 3m springboard at the 2008 European Junior Swimming Championships in Minsk, Belarus.

Alongside Yulia Prokopchuk, she won silver medals in the 10m synchronized platform event at the 2008 European Aquatics Championships in Eindhoven, Netherlands, and at the 2010 European Aquatics Championships in Budapest, Hungary.

In 2011, Chaplenko won bronze medals at the 2011 FINA Diving Grand Prix in Madrid and the 2011 European Diving Championships.
