= Yulia Koltunova =

Russian diver (born 1989)

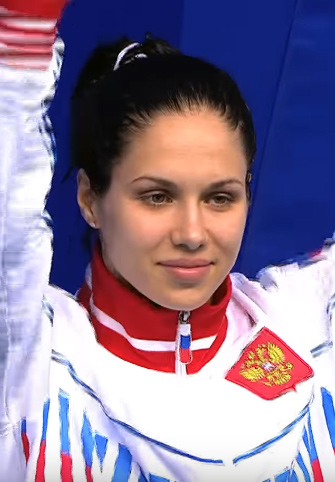
- Yulia Koltunova during women's diving 10m platform final, 27th Summer Universiade (2013), Kazan, Russia

Personal information
- Born: 4 May 1989 (age 37) Volgograd, Russia
Medal record
Women's diving
Representing Russia
Olympic Games
Silver medal – second place	2004 Athens	10 m synchro
European Aquatics Championships
Silver medal – second place	2006 Budapest	10 m synchro
European Diving Championships
Gold medal – first place	2009 Turin	10 m platform
Gold medal – first place	2009 Turin	10 m synchro
Gold medal – first place	2011 Turin	10 m synchro
Gold medal – first place	2011 Turin	Team event
Gold medal – first place	2013 Rostock	10 m synchro
Silver medal – second place	2011 Turin	10 m platform
Silver medal – second place	2013 Rostock	10 m platform
Bronze medal – third place	2013 Rostock	Team event
Universiade
Gold medal – first place	2013 Kazan	10 m platform
Silver medal – second place	2013 Kazan	10 m synchro

Yulia Nikolayevna Koltunova (Russian: Юлия Николаевна Колтунова) (born 4 May 1989 in Volgograd) is a Russian diver. Competing in the 2004 Summer Olympics, she won a silver medal in the women's synchronized 10 metre platform with teammate Natalia Goncharova.

She also competed at the 2012 Summer Olympics.
