= 2017 European Diving Championships – Women's 3 metre springboard =

== Results ==
Green denotes finalists

Rank	Diver	Nationality	Preliminary		Final	
Rank	Diver	Nationality	Points	Rank	Points	Rank
1st place, gold medalist(s)	Hanna Pysmenska	Ukraine	268.30	6	303.30	1
2nd place, silver medalist(s)	Michelle Heimberg	Switzerland	242.50	11	293.25	2
3rd place, bronze medalist(s)	Anastasiia Nedobiga	Ukraine	264.00	7	291.65	3
4	Inge Jansen	Netherlands	295.95	2	291.55	4
5	Kristina Ilinykh	Russia	302.00	1	285.55	5
6	Tina Punzel	Germany	262.85	8	283.95	6
7	Daphne Wils	Netherlands	281.30	4	267.10	7
8	Ekaterina Nekrasova	Russia	274.80	5	265.70	8
9	Elena Bertocchi	Italy	286.30	3	263.40	9
10	Daniella Nero	Sweden	241.15	12	244.50	10
11	Kaja Skrzek	Poland	250.45	10	220.80	11
12	Jessica Favre	Switzerland	262.20	9	218.85	12
13	Saskia Oettinghaus	Germany	240.90	13		
14	Alena Khamulkina	Belarus	238.60	14		
15	Villő Kormos	Hungary	228.60	15		
16	Marcela Marić	Croatia	221.05	16		
17	Emma Gullstrand	Sweden	203.90	17		
18	Anca Şerb	Romania	194.60	18		
19	Grace Reid	Great Britain	180.00	19		
20	Indrė Marija Girdauskaitė	Lithuania	175.35	20		
21	Tamara Sitchinava	Georgia	DNS			
