= James Denny (diver) =

British diver (born 1993)

Personal information
- Born: 20 September 1993 (age 32) Leeds

Sport
- Country: Great Britain England
- Events: 10 m, 10 m Synchro
- Club: City of Leeds Diving Club
- Partner: Tom Daley
Medal record
Commonwealth Games
Representing England
| Silver medal – second place | 2014 Glasgow | 10 m platform synchro |

James Denny (born 20 September 1993) is a British diver from Leeds who specialises in events from the 10 m platform.

== Career ==
Denny started diving in 2005. His first achievements at international level came with the 2011 Junior European Championships where he classified 4th from the 1 m springboard and 6th from the 10 m platform. During the period 2011-2014 he competed at the British Championships, where he collected several medals.

He represented England at the 2014 Commonwealth Games, winning a silver medal alongside his partner Tom Daley in the 10 m platform synchro, and classifying 6th in the individual event. Also during the same year, he took part in the 2014 European Aquatics Championships, where he missed on a bronze medal in the 10 m synchro event alongside Tom Daley and achieved a 12th place in the individual final.

== Results ==
=== Senior Results ===
| Year | Event | Venue | 1m Springboard | | | | 3m Springboard | | | | 10m Platform | | | | 3m Springboard Synchro | | | 10m Platform Synchro | | | | |
| Year | Event | Venue | Preliminary | | Final | | Preliminary | | Final | | Preliminary | | Final | | Partner | Final | | Partner | Preliminary | | Final | |
| Year | Event | Venue | Pts | Rk | Pts | Rk | Pts | Rk | Pts | Rk | Pts | Rk | Pts | Rk | Partner | Pts | Rk | Partner | Pts | Rk | Pts | Rk |
|---|---|---|---|---|---|---|---|---|---|---|---|---|---|---|---|---|---|---|---|---|---|---|
| 2010 | British Diving Championships | (England) Sheffield | 253.70 | 11 | did not advance | | 252.65 | 19 | did not advance | | 320.85 | 4 Q | 336.15 | 4 | —N/a | | | —N/a | | | | |
| 2011 | British Diving Championships | (England) Leeds | 317.50 | 4 Q | 338.05 | 4 | 284.25 | 13 | did not advance | | 312.95 | 7 Q | 412.25 | 5 | —N/a | | | —N/a | | | | |
| 2012 | British Diving Championships | (England) Sheffield | —N/a | | | | —N/a | | | | 370.75 | 3 Q | 390.20 | Bronze medal | O. Dingley | 359.73 | 4 | J. Meszaros | —N/a | | 320.52 | 3 |
| 2013 | British Diving Championships | (England) Plymouth | —N/a | | | | —N/a | | | | 351.40 | 2 Q | 374.90 | Silver medal | —N/a | | | —N/a | | | | |
| 2013 | European Diving Championships | (Germany) Rostock | —N/a | | | | —N/a | | | | 386.75 | 8 Q | 405.10 | 9 | —N/a | | | —N/a | | | | |
| 2014 | British Diving Championships | (England) Sheffield | —N/a | | | | 388.10 | 1 Q | 434.45 | Gold medal | —N/a | | | | O. Dingley | 386.19 | Silver medal | —N/a | | | | |
| 2014 | Commonwealth Games | (Scotland) Edinburgh | —N/a | | | | 394.05 | 6 Q | 410.90 | 6 | 408.40 | 6 Q | 397.65 | 6 | —N/a | | | T. Daley | —N/a | | 399.36 | Silver medal |
| 2014 | European Aquatics Championships | (Germany) Berlin | 355.10 | 9 Q | 329.15 | 12 | —N/a | | | | 357.30 | 12 Q | 311.60 | 12 | —N/a | | | T. Daley | 415.05 | 2 Q | 403.74 | 4 |
| 2015 | British Diving Championships | (England) Plymouth | 341.95 | 4 Q | 359.35 | 5 | 358.75 | 5 Q | 374.40 | 6 | —N/a | | | | —N/a | | | M. Lee | —N/a | | 373.14 | Gold medal |
