= Patrick Hausding =

German diver (born 1989)

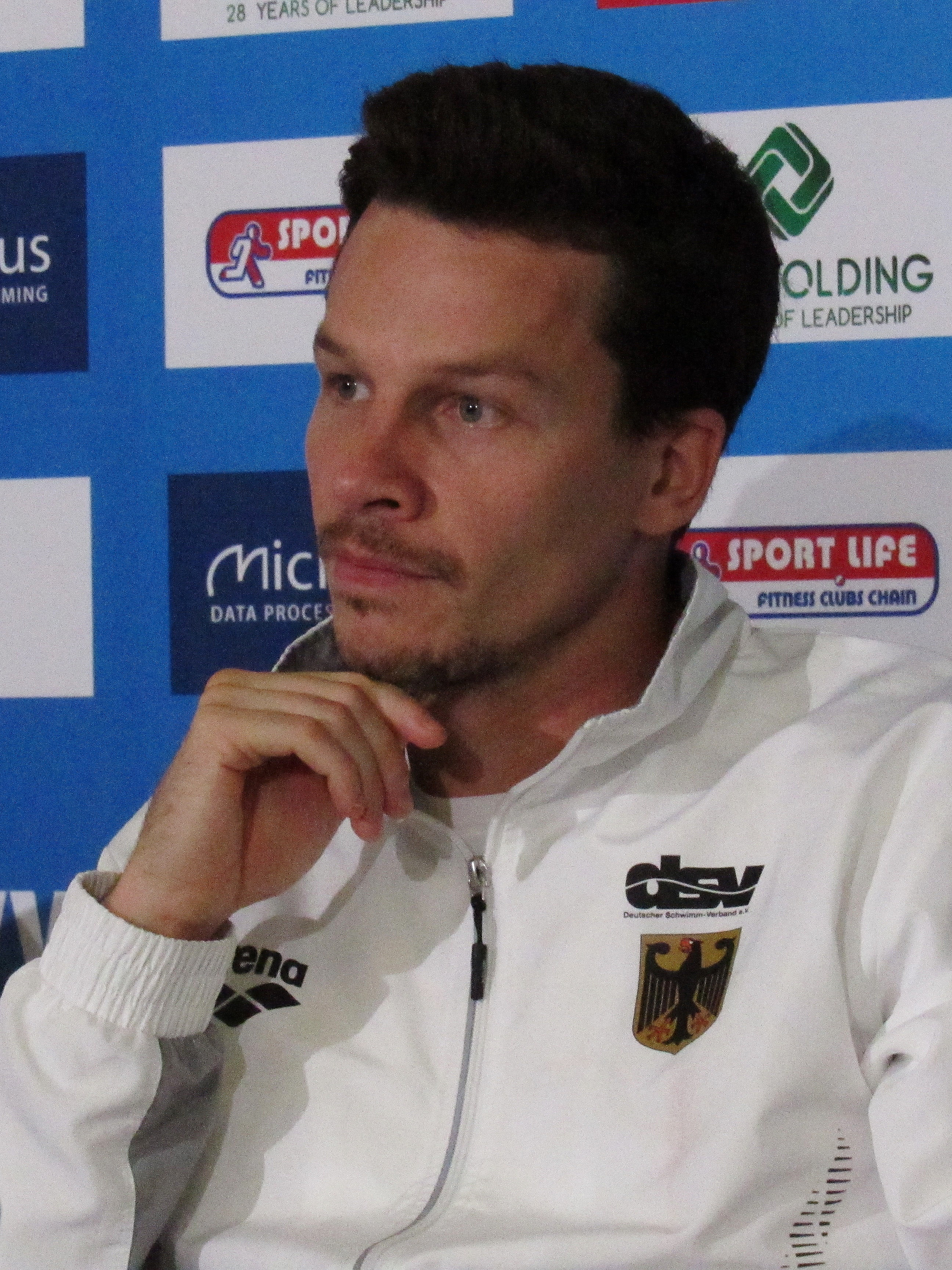
- Hausding in 2019

Personal information
- Nationality: German
- Born: 9 March 1989 (age 37) East Berlin, East Germany
- Height: 1.80 m (5 ft 11 in)
- Weight: 77 kg (170 lb)

Sport
- Country: Germany
- Sport: Diving
- Event(s): 3 m, 10 m, 3 m synchro, 10m Synchro
Medal record
Event	1st	2nd	3rd
Olympic Games	–	1	2
World Championships	1	2	1
FINA Diving World Cup	1	4	1
European Championships	17	14	6
Olympic Games
Silver medal – second place	2008 Beijing	10 m synchro
Bronze medal – third place	2016 Rio de Janeiro	3 m
Bronze medal – third place	2020 Tokyo	3 m synchro
World Championships
Gold medal – first place	2013 Barcelona	10m synchro
Silver medal – second place	2011 Shanghai	10 m synchro
Silver medal – second place	2017 Budapest	3 m
Bronze medal – third place	2017 Budapest	10 m synchro
European Championships
Gold medal – first place	2008 Eindhoven	10 m synchro
Gold medal – first place	2009 Turin	10 m synchro
Gold medal – first place	2010 Budapest	3 m
Gold medal – first place	2010 Budapest	10 m synchro
Gold medal – first place	2011 Turin	3 m
Gold medal – first place	2011 Turin	10 m synchro
Gold medal – first place	2012 Eindhoven	10 m synchro
Gold medal – first place	2013 Rostock	10 m synchro
Gold medal – first place	2014 Berlin	1 m
Gold medal – first place	2014 Berlin	3 m
Gold medal – first place	2014 Berlin	10 m synchro
Gold medal – first place	2015 Rostock	10 m synchro
Gold medal – first place	2016 London	10 m synchro
Gold medal – first place	2019 Kyiv	1 m
Gold medal – first place	2019 Kyiv	team
Gold medal – first place	2020 Budapest	1 m
Gold medal – first place	2020 Budapest	3 m synchro
Silver medal – second place	2010 Budapest	1 m
Silver medal – second place	2010 Budapest	10 m
Silver medal – second place	2010 Budapest	3 m synchro
Silver medal – second place	2011 Turin	10 m
Silver medal – second place	2011 Turin	3 m synchro
Silver medal – second place	2012 Eindhoven	3 m
Silver medal – second place	2012 Eindhoven	3 m synchro
Silver medal – second place	2013 Rostock	3m synchro
Silver medal – second place	2013 Rostock	10 m
Silver medal – second place	2014 Berlin	3 m synchro
Silver medal – second place	2015 Rostock	team
Silver medal – second place	2017 Kyiv	1 m
Silver medal – second place	2019 Kyiv	3 m
Silver medal – second place	2019 Kyiv	3 m synchro
Bronze medal – third place	2009 Turin	10 m
Bronze medal – third place	2013 Rostock	3 m
Bronze medal – third place	2015 Rostock	3 m synchro
Bronze medal – third place	2018 Glasgow	3 m synchro
Bronze medal – third place	2020 Budapest	10 m synchro
Bronze medal – third place	2020 Budapest	team
FINA Diving World Cup
Gold medal – first place	2016 Rio de Janeiro	3 m synchro
Silver medal – second place	2008 Beijing	10 m synchro
Silver medal – second place	2014 Shanghai	3 m synchro
Silver medal – second place	2014 Shanghai	10 m synchro
Silver medal – second place	2016 Rio de Janeiro	10 m synchro
Bronze medal – third place	2012 London	10 m synchro

Patrick Hausding (born 9 March 1989) is a German diver.

At the 2020 Summer Olympics in Tokyo, with his teammate Lars Rüdiger, Hausding won a bronze medal in the men's synchronized 3 metre springboard competition. However, he did not repeat his bronze medal success in the men's 3 m springboard competition from the 2016 Summer Olympics in Rio de Janeiro, failing to proceed beyond the preliminary round in Tokyo, finishing 21st in a field of 29 divers.

At the 2016 Summer Olympics, in addition to his bronze medal success in the men's 3 m springboard competition, Hausding competed in the men's synchronized 3 m springboard event with teammate Stephan Feck. They finished in 4th place. He also competed in the men's synchronized 10 m platform event with teammate Sascha Klein. They finished in 4th place.

At the 2012 Summer Olympics, he competed in the 3 m springboard and the men's 10 m synchronised platform with Sascha Klein.

Competing in the 2008 Summer Olympics, he won a silver medal in the men's synchronized 10 metre platform with teammate Sascha Klein.

Olympic Games
Preceded by Timo Boll	Flagbearer for Germany (with Laura Ludwig); Tokyo 2020	Succeeded by Anna-Maria Wagner; Dennis Schröder; París 2024
