= 2013 European Diving Championships =

Water sport competitions

- Host city: Rostock
- Country: Germany
- Nations: 19
- Athletes: 100
- Events: 11
- Dates: 18–23 June
- Website: Website

2013 European Diving Championships
1 m springboard	men		women
3 m springboard	men		women
10 m platform	men		women
Synchronized; 3 m springboard	men		women
Synchronized; 10 m platform	men		women
Team		team

The 2013 European Diving Championships was the third edition of the European Diving Championships and took place from 18 to 23 June 2013 in Rostock, Germany. A total of eleven disciplines were contested.

== Results ==
=== Medal table ===
Rank	Nation	Gold	Silver	Bronze	Total
1	Ukraine	4	1	2	7
2	Russia	3	4	4	11
3	Germany	2	4	4	10
4	Italy	2	1	0	3
5	Great Britain	0	1	1	2
Totals (5 entries)		11	11	11	33

=== Men ===
Event	Gold		Silver		Bronze	
1 m springboard	Illya Kvasha; Ukraine	467.75	Martin Wolfram; Germany	414.75	Oliver Homuth; Germany	414.45
3 m springboard	Ilya Zakharov; Russia	502.90	Evgeny Kuznetsov; Russia	471.55	Patrick Hausding; Germany	428.70
10 m platform	Oleksandr Bondar; Ukraine	521.45	Patrick Hausding; Germany	514.65	Victor Minibaev; Russia	500.35
3 m synchro springboard	Russia; Evgeny Kuznetsov; Ilya Zakharov	460.44	Germany; Patrick Hausding; Stephan Feck	431.58	Ukraine; Oleksandr Gorshkovozov; Oleg Kolodiy	422.52
10 m synchro platform	Germany; Patrick Hausding; Sascha Klein	463.20	Russia; Victor Minibaev; Artem Chesakov	458.76	Ukraine; Oleksandr Gorshkovozov; Dmytro Mezhenskyi	436.86

=== Women ===
Event	Gold		Silver		Bronze	
1 m springboard	Tania Cagnotto; Italy	301.20	Nadezhda Bazhina; Russia	274.35	Maria Polyakova; Russia	273.90
3 m springboard	Tina Punzel; Germany	336.70	Tania Cagnotto; Italy	331.85	Nadezhda Bazhina; Russia	326.10
10 m platform	Iuliia Prokopchuk; Ukraine	373.30	Yulia Koltunova; Russia	371.10	Maria Kurjo; Germany	323.00
3 m synchro springboard	Italy; Tania Cagnotto; Francesca Dallapé	324.30	Ukraine; Hanna Pysmenska; Olena Fedorova	300.60	Great Britain; Rebecca Gallantree; Alicia Blagg	292.17
10 m synchro platform	Russia; Yulia Koltunova; Natalia Goncharova	315.66	Great Britain; Tonia Couch; Sarah Barrow	306.24	Germany; Maria Kurjo; Julia Stolle	299.16

=== Mixed ===
Event	Gold		Silver		Bronze	
Team event	Ukraine; Oleksandr Bondar; Yulia Prokopchuk	413.20	Germany; Sascha Klein; Tina Punzel	384.00	Russia; Evgeny Kuznetsov; Yulia Koltunova	348.10

== Participating nations ==
100 athletes from 19 nations competed.

- Austria (3)
- Belarus (4)
- Finland (5)
- France (5)
- Georgia (1)
- Germany (11)
- Great Britain (9)
- Greece (4)
- Hungary (6)
- Italy (12)
- Lithuania (1)
- Netherlands (4)
- Norway (3)
- Poland (2)
- Romania (2)
- Russia (11)
- Spain (2)
- Sweden (3)
- Ukraine (12)
