= Aleksandr Bondar (diver) =

Ukrainian-Russian diver (born 1993)

Personal information
- Full name: Aleksandr Igorevich Bondar
- National team: Ukraine → Russia
- Born: 25 October 1993 (age 32) Luhansk, Ukraine
- Height: 1.72 m (5 ft 8 in)
- Weight: 64 kg (141 lb)

Sport
- Country: Ukraine → Russia
- Sport: Diving
- Event(s): 10 m, 10 m synchro
- Club: Youth of Moscow
Medal record
Men's diving
Representing (Russia) ROC
Olympic Games
Bronze medal – third place	2020 Tokyo	10 m synchro
Representing Neutral Athletes B
World Championships
Bronze medal – third place	2025 Singapore	10 m mixed synchro
Representing Russia
World Championships
Silver medal – second place	2017 Budapest	10 m synchro
Silver medal – second place	2019 Gwangju	10 m synchro
Bronze medal – third place	2019 Gwangju	10 m platform
European Aquatics Championships
Gold medal – first place	2018 Glasgow	10 m platform
Gold medal – first place	2018 Glasgow	10 m synchro
Gold medal – first place	2020 Budapest	10 m platform
Silver medal – second place	2020 Budapest	10 m synchro
Military World Games
Bronze medal – third place	2019 Wuhan	10 m platform
Bronze medal – third place	2019 Wuhan	10 m synchro
Representing Ukraine
World Championships
Bronze medal – third place	2011 Shanghai	10 m synchro
European Aquatics Championships
Silver medal – second place	2014 Berlin	Team event
Bronze medal – third place	2014 Berlin	10 m synchro
European Diving Championships
Gold medal – first place	2013 Rostock	10 m platform
Gold medal – first place	2013 Rostock	Team event
Youth Olympic Games
Silver medal – second place	2010 Singapore	3 m springboard
Silver medal – second place	2010 Singapore	10 m platform

Aleksandr Igorevich Bondar (Ukrainian: Олександр Ігорович Бондар, Russian: Александр Игоревич Бондарь, IPA: [ɐlʲɪˈksandr ˈbondərʲ]; born 25 October 1993) is a Ukrainian and Russian diver.

== Career ==
He competed for Ukraine at the 2012 Summer Olympics in the men's synchronized 10 metre platform.

Bondar moved to Russia at the end of 2014 to be closer to relatives and his Russian girlfriend, Yekaterina Fedorchenko. He and Fedorchenko married in January 2015. In October 2015, he became a Russian citizen.
