= Andrea Chiarabini =

Italian diver (born 1995)

Personal information
- Nationality: Italian
- Born: 12 March 1995 (age 31) Rome, Italy

Sport
- Country: Italy
- Sport: Diving
- Event(s): 10 m, 3 m, 3 m synchro
- Club: Fiamme Oro

Andrea Chiarabini (born 12 March 1995) is an Italian diver. He competed for Italy at the 2012 Summer Olympics and the 2016 Summer Olympics in Rio de Janeiro with Giovanni Tocci.
