= Illya Kvasha =

Ukrainian diver (born 1988)

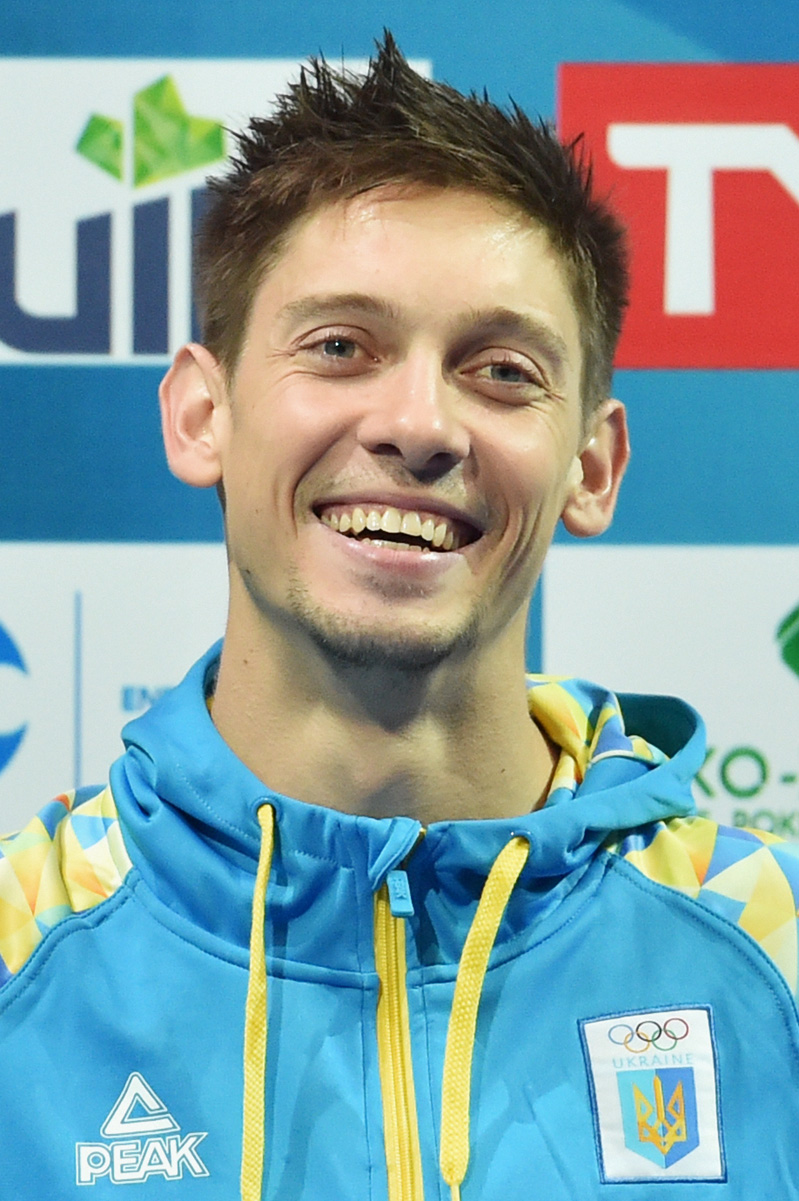
- Illya Kvasha at the 2017 European Diving Championships in Kyiv

Personal information
- Full name: Illya Olehovych Kvasha
- Born: 5 March 1988 (age 38) Mykolaiv, Ukrainian SSR, Soviet Union
- Height: 1.75 m (5 ft 9 in)

Sport
- Country: Ukraine
- Event(s): 1m, 3m, 3m synchro
- Partner(s): Oleksiy Prygorov; Oleh Kolodiy
Medal record
Men's diving
Representing Ukraine
Event	1st	2nd	3rd
Olympic Games	0	0	1
World Championships	0	2	1
World Cup	0	0	1
European Championships	5	1	5
European Diving Championships	4	5	1
Summer Universiade	0	2	3
World Junior Championships	0	2	0
European Junior Diving Championships	6	1	1
Total	15	13	13
Olympic Games
Bronze medal – third place	2008 Beijing	3m synchro
World Championships
Silver medal – second place	2013 Barcelona	1m springboard
Silver medal – second place	2015 Kazan	1m springboard
Bronze medal – third place	2017 Budapest	3m synchro
World Cup
Bronze medal – third place	2010 Changzhou	3m synchro
European Championships
Gold medal – first place	2008 Eindhoven	1m springboard
Gold medal – first place	2010 Budapest	1m springboard
Gold medal – first place	2010 Budapest	3m synchro
Gold medal – first place	2012 Eindhoven	1m springboard
Gold medal – first place	2016 London	1m springboard
Silver medal – second place	2008 Eindhoven	3m springboard
Bronze medal – third place	2012 Eindhoven	3m synchro
Bronze medal – third place	2014 Berlin	3m springboard
Bronze medal – third place	2014 Berlin	3m synchro
Bronze medal – third place	2016 London	3m springboard
Bronze medal – third place	2016 London	3m synchro
European Diving Championships
Gold medal – first place	2009 Turin	1m springboard
Gold medal – first place	2009 Turin	3m synchro
Gold medal – first place	2013 Rostock	1m springboard
Gold medal – first place	2017 Kyiv	1m springboard
Silver medal – second place	2009 Turin	3m springboard
Silver medal – second place	2011 Turin	1m springboard
Silver medal – second place	2015 Rostock	3m synchro
Silver medal – second place	2017 Kyiv	3m springboard
Silver medal – second place	2017 Kyiv	3m synchro
Bronze medal – third place	2015 Rostock	Team event
Summer Universiade
Silver medal – second place	2011 Shenzhen	Team
Silver medal – second place	2009 Belgrade	3m synchro
Bronze medal – third place	2009 Belgrade	3m springboard
Bronze medal – third place	2011 Shenzhen	1m springboard
Bronze medal – third place	2007 Bangkok	Team
World Junior Championships
Silver medal – second place	2006 Kuala Lumpur	1 m springboard
Silver medal – second place	2006 Kuala Lumpur	3 m springboard
European Junior Diving Championships
Gold medal – first place	2003 Edinburgh	1 m springboard
Gold medal – first place	2003 Edinburgh	10 m platform
Gold medal – first place	2004 Aachen	1 m springboard
Gold medal – first place	2005 Elektrostal	3 m springboard
Gold medal – first place	2006 Palma de Mallorca	1 m springboard
Gold medal – first place	2006 Palma de Mallorca	3 m springboard
Silver medal – second place	2005 Elektrostal	3 m synchro
Bronze medal – third place	2003 Edinburgh	3 m springboard

Illya Olehovych Kvasha (Ukrainian: Ілля Олегович Кваша; born 5 March 1988) is a Ukrainian diver. Competing with Oleksiy Prygorov, he won the bronze medal in the 3 m spring synchro at the 2008 Summer Olympics in Beijing. Kvasha is also a multiple European champion both individual and synchronised.

== Career ==
He also competed at the 2012 Summer Olympics, in both the individual and the synchro with Prygorov. At the 2016 Olympics, he reached the final of the individual 3 m springboard.

He specializes in 1m and 3m springboard. He is twice silver medalist of the World Championships in 1m competition and once bronze medalist in 3m synchro event which was his greatest success in a synchro competition since Olympic bronze.

Kvasha is one of the most famous and popular modern Ukrainian athletes. He was also thrice awarded The Best Sportsman of the Month by the NOC of Ukraine: in March 2008, April 2009, and June 2017.
