= Sascha Klein =

German diver

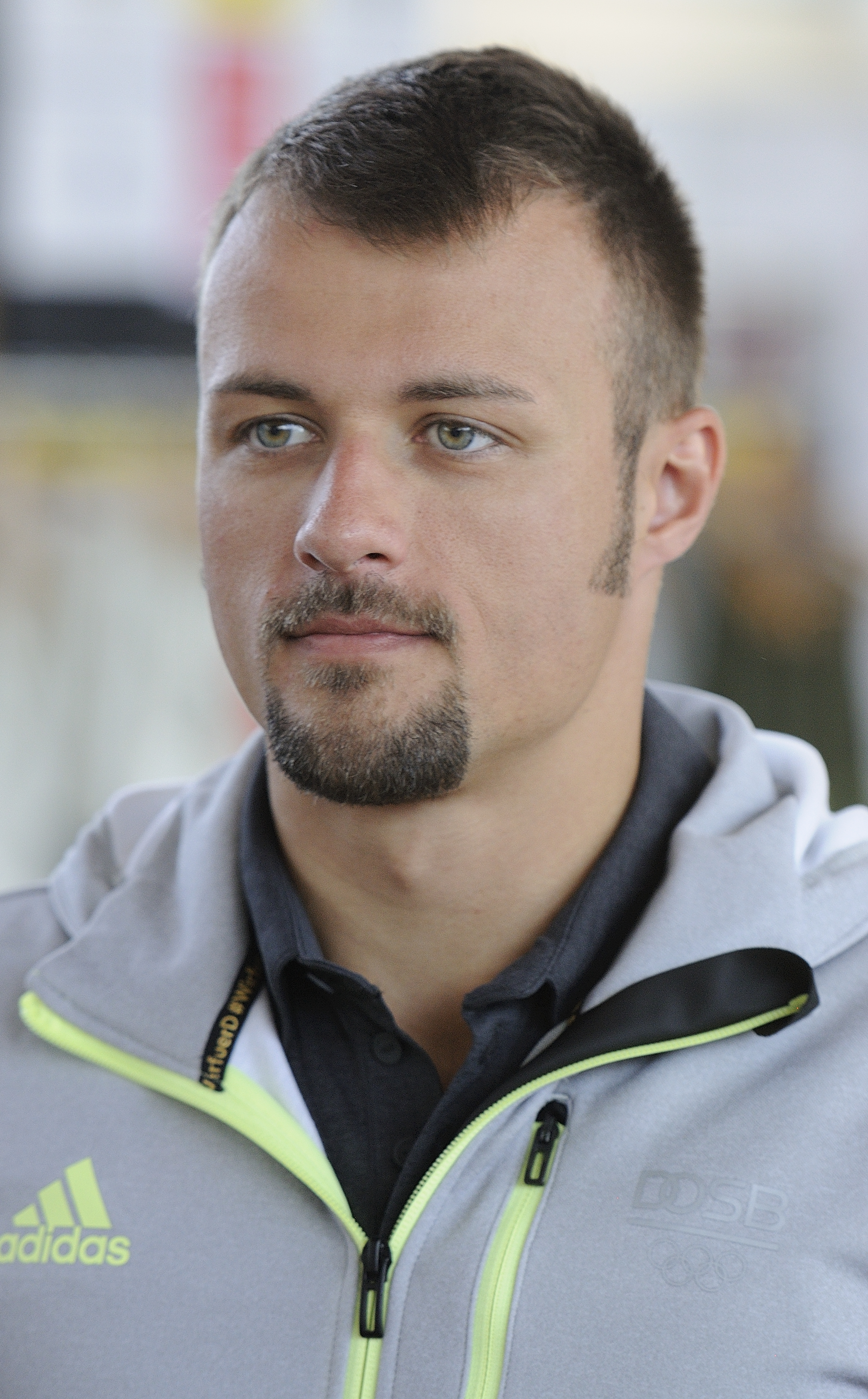
- Klein in 2016

Personal information
- Born: 12 September 1985 (age 40) Eschweiler, West Germany
- Height: 1.73 m (5 ft 8 in)
- Weight: 71 kg (157 lb)

Sport
- Events: 10 m, 10 m synchro
- Partner: Patrick Hausding
Medal record
Olympic Games
| Silver medal – second place | 2008 Beijing | 10 m synchro |
World Championships
| Gold medal – first place | 2013 Barcelona | 10 m synchro |
| Silver medal – second place | 2011 Shanghai | 10 m synchro |
| Bronze medal – third place | 2011 Shanghai | 10 m |
| Bronze medal – third place | 2013 Barcelona | 10 m |
| Bronze medal – third place | 2017 Budapest | 10 m synchro platform |
FINA Diving World Cup
| Gold medal – first place | 2008 Beijing | 10 m |
| Silver medal – second place | 2008 Beijing | 10 m synchro |
| Silver medal – second place | 2014 Shanghai | 10 m synchro |
| Silver medal – second place | 2016 Rio de Janeiro | 10 m synchro |
| Bronze medal – third place | 2012 London | 10 m synchro |
European Championships
| Gold medal – first place | 2008 Eindhoven | 10 m synchro |
| Gold medal – first place | 2009 Turin | 10 m synchro |
| Gold medal – first place | 2010 Budapest | Team |
| Gold medal – first place | 2010 Budapest | 10 m |
| Gold medal – first place | 2010 Budapest | 10 m synchro |
| Gold medal – first place | 2011 Turin | 10 m |
| Gold medal – first place | 2011 Turin | 10 m synchro |
| Gold medal – first place | 2012 Eindhoven | 10 m synchro |
| Gold medal – first place | 2013 Rostock | 10 m synchro |
| Gold medal – first place | 2014 Berlin | 10 m synchro |
| Gold medal – first place | 2015 Rostock | 10 m synchro |
| Gold medal – first place | 2016 London | 10 m synchro |
| Silver medal – second place | 2006 Budapest | 10 m synchro |
| Silver medal – second place | 2008 Eindhoven | 10 m |
| Silver medal – second place | 2013 Rostock | Team |
| Bronze medal – third place | 2014 Berlin | 10 m |
| Bronze medal – third place | 2014 Berlin | Team |

Sascha Klein (born 12 September 1985) is a German diver. Competing in the 2008 Summer Olympics, he won a silver medal in the men's synchronized 10 metre platform with teammate Patrick Hausding. At the 2016 Summer Olympics, he competed in men's 10 m platform where he finished in 9th place. He also competed in men's synchronized 10 m platform with teammate Patrick Hausding. They finished in 4th place.
