= Yauheni Karaliou =

Belarusian diver

Personal information
- Born: 26 March 1991 (age 35)

Sport
- Sport: Diving
Medal record
Representing Belarus
European Championships
Silver medal – second place	2014 Berlin	10 m synchro

Yauheni Karaliou (born 26 March 1991) is a Belarusian diver. At the 2013 European Diving Championships in Kazan he finished third in the Men's Synchronized diving, and 4th in the Men's Synchronized diving and 10m platform. After competing at the 19th FINA Diving World Cup in Shanghai, he competed at the 2014 European Aquatics Championships in Berlin in the Men's 3 m synchro springboard with Andrei Pawluk, and in the Men's 10 m synchro platform with Vadim Kaptur.
