= Sarah Barrow =

British diver

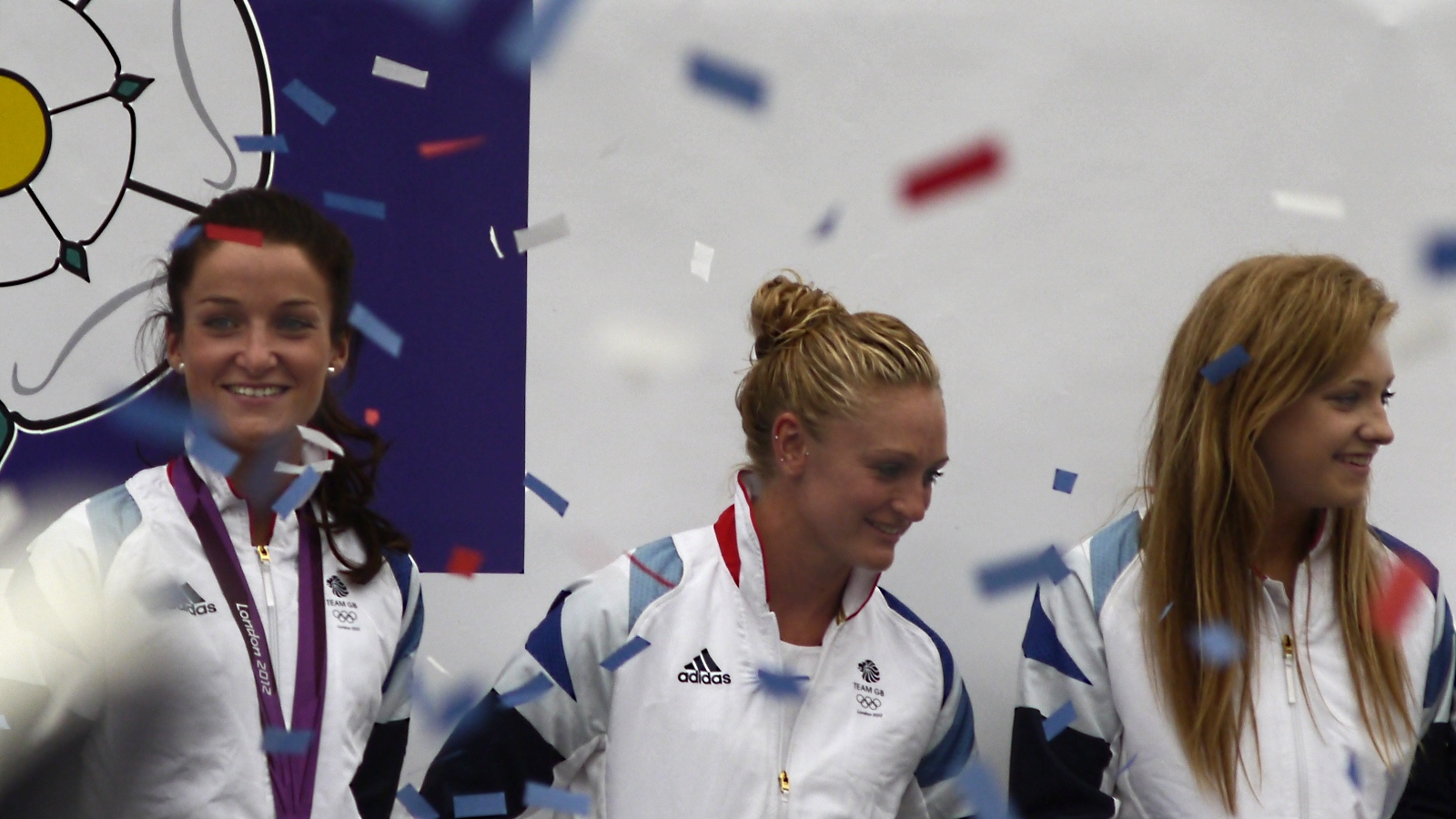
- Lizzie Armitstead, Sarah Barrow and Alicia Blagg

Personal information
- Born: 22 October 1988 (age 37) Plymouth, England
- Height: 1.63 m (5 ft 4 in)
- Weight: 52 kg (115 lb)

Sport
- Club: Plymouth Diving
- Coached by: 2010 onwards Andy Banks
Medal record
Representing Great Britain
European Championships
Gold medal – first place	2012 Eindhoven	10 metre synchro
Gold medal – first place	2014 Berlin	10 m platform
Silver medal – second place	2013 Rostock	10 metre synchro
Representing England
Commonwealth Games
Silver medal – second place	2014 Glasgow	10 m platform synchro

Sarah Barrow (born 22 October 1988) is a British retired diver who competed in several LEN European Aquatics Championships and Commonwealth Games, where she won multiple medals.

== Career ==
Sarah Barrow was born on 22 October 1988.

Barrow competed at the 2006 Commonwealth Games in the 10 m synchro event with Monique Gladding. The team finished in fifth. She competed in the same event at the 2010 Commonwealth Games, this time with Tonia Couch. They finished fourth, and replicated this result at the 2011 European Championships.

Barrow won the gold medal at the 2012 European Championships at the 10 metre synchro event, with Tonia Couch. They scored a then personal best of 319.56 points, beating the Ukrainian pair by 8.88 points. This was the first European medal awarded to female British divers in 74 years. The team of Barrow and Couch had finished in 4th at the preceding World Championships in 2011.

Barrow represented Great Britain at the 2012 Summer Olympics, in the 10 m platform synchro event with Tonia Couch, and at the 2016 Summer Olympics, in the 10 m platform individual event.

The team of Barrow and Couch were unable to defend their European title in 2013, finishing with a silver medal. That year, Barrow finished fourth in the individual 10 m platform event at the World Championships.

In 2014, Barrow won Commonwealth silver in the 10 m synchro event, with Tonia Couch. That year, she also finished 4th in the individual 10 m at the World Championships, the best result ever for a British woman. At the European Championships in that year, she won the gold medal in the individual 10 m event, the first individual European gold medal for a British woman in 87 years (1927), and first individual medal of any colour since 1958.

Barrow and Couch were split up by British coaches in the synchro event in early 2016, after Barrow had struggled with shin injuries and a non-cancerous tumour. This was despite the fact that Barrow and Couch had been the pair who secured GB's Olympic place in the 10 m synchro event.

== Later career and retirement ==
Barrow retired after the 2016 Summer Olympics, where she placed in fifth place with Couch in the 10m synchro. For the last 6 years of her 13-year career, she trained at Plymouth Diving Club. She also studied Sport Science at Leeds Metropolitan University.
