= Tonia Couch =

British diver

Personal information
- Full name: Tonia Couch
- Nationality: British
- Born: 20 May 1989 (age 37) Plymouth, Devon, England
- Occupation: Diving coach
- Height: 166 cm (5 ft 5 in)
- Weight: 58 kg (128 lb)

Sport
- Club: Plymouth Diving
- Coached by: Andy Banks
Medal record
Representing Great Britain
European Championships
Gold medal – first place	2012 Eindhoven	10 metre synchro
Silver medal – second place	2013 Rostock	10 metre synchro
Silver medal – second place	2016 London	10 m platform
Representing England
Commonwealth Games
Silver medal – second place	2014 Glasgow	10 m platform synchro

Tonia Couch (born 20 May 1989) is a former British Olympic diver.

== Biography ==
Tonia Couch was born in Plymouth. She had been a fairly accomplished competitive gymnast when she participated in diving for a "trial" in September 1999. Just four weeks later, she won her first competition, a novice event at Crystal Palace in London. In February 2002, she became the youngest girl ever to qualify for the lottery funded Junior Olympic Programme, when she took bronze in the Junior girls platform event at the British Championships. It was at that point that her talent on the platform was really recognised.

She participated at the 2005 and 2007 World Championships, finishing 25th in the 10 m platform in both.

In 2008 and 2009, her eighth-place finishes at the Olympics and the World Championships, the best result by a British female for 20 years, secured her place in British diving history.

She competed at the 2009 World Championships in Rome and at her second Commonwealth Games in 2010 in Delhi. At the 2010 Commonwealth games her 10m synchro partnership with Sarah Barrow gained fourth place.

Couch reached the World final again in 2011, finishing ninth in the 10m platform. In synchro partnership with Sarah Barrow, the pair finished fourth.

The duo won the European gold and World Cup bronze in 2012, and a finished in fifth-place in front of a home crowd at the London 2012 Olympics.

In the 2013 season, she reclaimed the British 10m platform title, and competed at her fifth consecutive World Championships in the summer, finishing ninth in the 10m platform and fifth with Barrow in the 10m synchro."

In the 2014 season she finished fourth at the World Cup in Shanghai, then combined with Barrow to win a silver medal at the Commonwealth Games held in Glasgow, 2014.

At the March 2015 World Series in Dubai, Couch took third place in the 10m platform event. She won the overall title of Diving World Series champion for the 10m platform, after winning four bronze medals in the series. She and Sarah Barrow also won two bronzes and a silver in the synchro event. She participated in the World Championships in Kazan, reaching 8th in the 10 m platform event and 6th in the 10 m synchro event with Sarah Barrow. This helped Team GB to secure a quota place at the 2016 Olympics.

In 2016, Couch appeared on Deal or no Deal on Tour as a box-opener.

Later that year Tonia also came 8th in the regional welly boot throwing contest in Chudleigh.

Couch participated in 10m platform diving in Diving World Series 2016 in Kazan in April 2016 and won a silver medal with a score of 365.90, less than two points behind the gold winner Qian Ren. Her best dive was an inward 3 1/2 somersaults in pike position (DD 3.2) which got a score of 81.60.

In the Rio Olympics, Couch and Lois Toulson won fifth place in synchronized 10m platform with a score of 319.44. Couch also competed in 10m platform and reached the finals, finishing in 12th place with a score of 323.70.

She participated in Diving World Series 2017 Beijing between 3–5 March 2017 competing in the Women's synchronised 10m, teamed with Toulson and finishing in fifth place with a score of 294.72. Couch participated in the Diving World Series 2017 between 9 - 11 Mar 2017 in Guangzhou, again teamed with Lois Toulson and finishing in 5th place with a score of 308.16 in the 10m synchronized platform diving. On 31 March 2017 Couch and Toulson competed in the Diving World Series 2017 in Kazan, again finishing in fifth place in the 10m platform synchronized diving with a score of 269.58.

She qualified for the World Championships in 2016, competing in the synchronised 10 m platform event with Toulson.

Following her retirement, Couch received a special recognition award at the British Diving Championships on 26 January 2018. She appeared as a diving pundit as part of the BBC's coverage of the 2024 Summer Olympic Games.

== Diving achievements ==
Competition	2003	2004	2005	2006	2007	2008	2009	2010	2011	2012	2013	2014	2015	2016	2017
Olympics, 10m synchro						8th				5th				5th	
Olympics, 10m platform						8th								12th	
FINA World Championship, 10m synchro			10th		9th				4th		5th		6th		7th
FINA World Championship, 10m platform			25th		25th		8th		9th		9th		8th		
European Championship, 10m platform				6th							5th			2nd	
European Championship, 10m synchro										1st	2nd			5th	
Commonwealth Games, 10m synchro				4th				4th				2nd			
Commonwealth Games, 10m platform				7th				8th				5th			
European Champions Cup, 10m synchro			4th	3rd											
FINA Diving Grand Prix, 10m platform			5th			5th	9th	3rd	5th		9th				
FINA Diving Grand Prix, 10m synchro						5th		3rd			3rd				
FINA World Cup, 10m platform							11th								
FINA World Cup, 10m synchro				4th						3rd					
World Junior Championship, 10m platform		19th	15th												
European Junior Championship, 10m platform	17th	10th	8th												
British Championship, 10m synchro					1st	2nd	2nd	1st	1st	1st					
British Championship, 10m platform					1st	3rd	2nd	2nd	1st	2nd					
British Gas National Cup, 10m synchro										1st					
British Gas National Cup, 10m platform									2nd	2nd					
