= Ilya Zakharov =

Russian diver (born 1991)

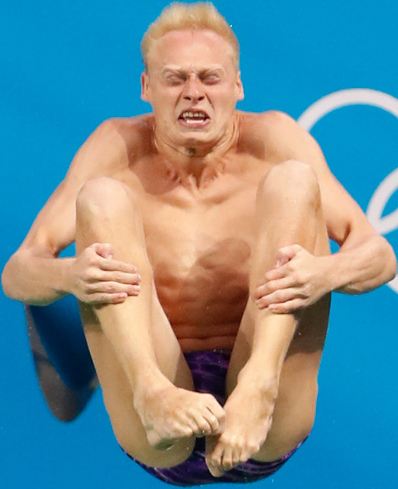
- Zakharov in 2016

Personal information
- Full name: Ilya Leonidovich Zakharov
- Nationality: Russian
- Born: 2 May 1991 (age 35) Leningrad, Russian SFSR, Soviet Union
- Height: 1.77 m (5 ft 10 in)
- Weight: 70 kg (154 lb)

Sport
- Country: Russia
- Sport: Diving
- Event(s): 3 m, 3 m synchro
- Club: Dynamo
Medal record
Event	1st	2nd	3rd
Olympic Games	1	1	–
World Championships	1	5	1
European Championships	9	7	3
Summer Universiade	4	1	1
Total	15	14	5
Representing Russia
Olympic Games
Gold medal – first place	2012 London	3 m springboard
Silver medal – second place	2012 London	3 m springboard synchro
World Championships
Gold medal – first place	2017 Budapest	3 m springboard synchro
Silver medal – second place	2011 Shanghai	3 m springboard
Silver medal – second place	2011 Shanghai	3 m springboard synchro
Silver medal – second place	2013 Barcelona	3 m springboard synchro
Silver medal – second place	2015 Kazan	3 m springboard
Silver medal – second place	2015 Kazan	3 m springboard synchro
Bronze medal – third place	2017 Budapest	3 m springboard
European Championships
Gold medal – first place	2011 Turin	3 m springboard synchro
Gold medal – first place	2011 Turin	Team
Gold medal – first place	2012 Debrecen	3 m springboard synchro
Gold medal – first place	2013 Rostock	3 m springboard
Gold medal – first place	2013 Rostock	3 m springboard synchro
Gold medal – first place	2014 Berlin	3 m springboard synchro
Gold medal – first place	2015 Rostock	3 m springboard synchro
Gold medal – first place	2017 Kyiv	3 m springboard
Gold medal – first place	2017 Kyiv	3 m springboard synchro
Gold medal – first place	2018 Glasgow	3 m springboard synchro
Silver medal – second place	2009 Turin	3 m springboard synchro
Silver medal – second place	2010 Budapest	3 m springboard
Silver medal – second place	2010 Budapest	10 m platform synchro
Silver medal – second place	2011 Turin	3 m springboard
Silver medal – second place	2012 Debrecen	10 m platform synchro
Silver medal – second place	2016 London	3 m springboard synchro
Silver medal – second place	2018 Glasgow	3 m springboard
Bronze medal – third place	2011 Turin	10 m platform synchro
Bronze medal – third place	2012 Debrecen	3 m springboard
Bronze medal – third place	2015 Rostock	3 m springboard
Summer Universiade
Gold medal – first place	2013 Kazan	3 m springboard synchro
Gold medal – first place	2017 Taipei	3 m springboard
Gold medal – first place	2017 Taipei	3 m springboard synchro
Gold medal – first place	2017 Taipei	Team classification
Silver medal – second place	2011 Shenzhen	10 m platform synchro
Silver medal – second place	2013 Kazan	Team
Bronze medal – third place	2011 Shenzhen	3 m springboard
Bronze medal – third place	2011 Shenzhen	Team

Ilya Leonidovich Zakharov (Russian: Илья Леонидович Захаров; born 2 May 1991) is a Russian diver and politician. He is the 2012 Olympics gold medalist in 3 metre Springboard.

== Career ==
=== Junior ===
In 2007, Zakharov debuted in international tournament in diving at the Lambertz-Printenspringen in Germany where he won gold in 10m platform, a pair of silver medal with Evgeny Kuznetsov in 3m Springboard Synchro and a bronze in 3m springboard.

In 2008, Zakharov won gold in 10m Platform at the Cup of Russia. He scored 456.70 points ahead of compatriot Victor Minibaev who scored 449.25. At the 2008 European Junior Championships in Minsk, Belarus, he won two gold medals (1m Springboard and 10m Platform) and a pair of silver medal with Igor Koryakin in 3m Synchro Springboard. At the 2008 Junior World Championship, he won a pair of bronze medal with Igor Koryakin in 3m Synchro Springboard and silver medal in individual behind Chinese diver Wang Jihan.

=== Senior ===
In 2009, at the fourth stage of the Grand Prix in Montreal, Canada, Zakharov and Kuznetsov won the silver medal in 3m synchro springboard and in Budapest, Hungary at the European Youth Championships He won three gold medals, in individual events ( 3m Springboard and 10m Platform) as well as in 3m synchro springboard with Victor Minibaev.

In 2010, at the Rostov-on-Don Grand Prix in diving, Zakharov and Minibaev won the bronze medal and in Montreal, Canada at the Grand Prix in diving athlete paired with Evgeny Kuznetsov won the bronze medal in synchronized diving three-meter springboard. At the World Cup in Guangzhou, China, Zakharov and Minbaev won silver in synchronized diving behind Chinese divers Cao Yuan and Zhang Yanquan.

In 2011, at the World Championships, Zakharov won the silver medal in 3m Springboard and a pair of silver medal with Kuznetsov in 3m Spring Synchro.

In 2012, (Note: "Ilya Zakharov". London 2012. The London Organising Committee of the Olympic Games and Paralympic Games Limited.) he won the Olympic Gold medal in the Men's 3 metre springboard defeating Chinese divers Qin Kai and He Chong. He also won the silver medal in the Men's synchronized 3 metre springboard, alongside Evgeny Kuznetsov, and competed in the Men's synchronized 10 metre platform, with Victor Minibaev. Zakharov was awarded the FINA Male Diver of the Year of 2012.

In 2013, Zakharov won gold medal at the 2013 European Championships in 3 m Springboard and 3m Spring Synchro.

In 2016, Zakharov attempted to defend his Olympic gold medal in the Men's 3 metre springboard, but did not advance past the semifinal round after a failed dive that resulted in a score of zero.

At the 2017 World Aquatics Championships in Budapest, Hungary, the Russian won his first gold medal in 3 m synchronized springboard, with his partner Kuznetsov.

== Politics ==
On 11 September 2022, Zakharov was elected to the Saratov Oblast Duma with the New People party during that year's regional elections.
