= Stephan Feck =

German diver

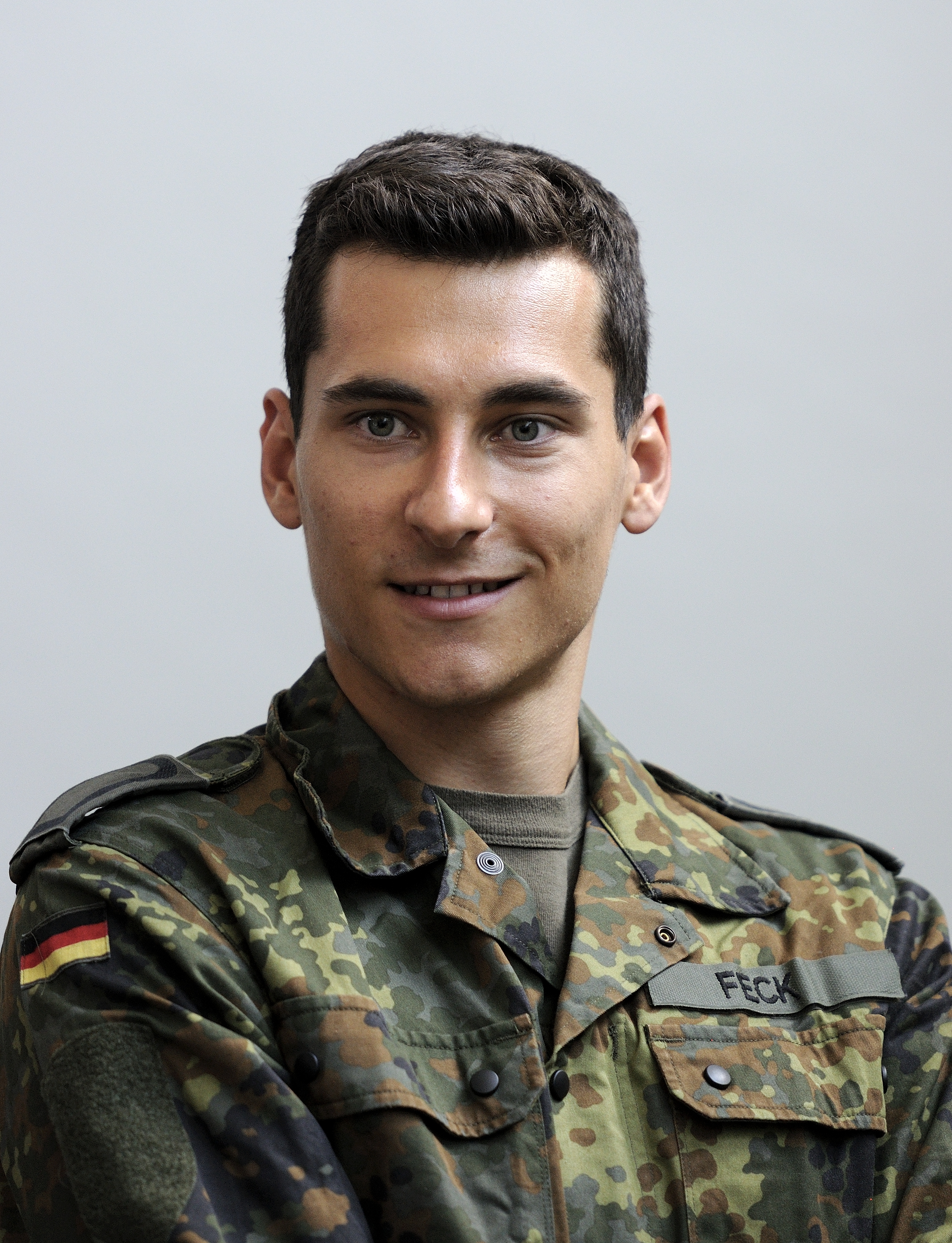

Personal information
- Born: 17 February 1990 (age 36) Leipzig, East Germany

Sport
- Sport: Diving
Medal record
Representing Germany
European Championships
Silver medal – second place	2013 Rostock	3m springboard synchro
Silver medal – second place	2014 Berlin	3 m synchro

Stephan Feck (born 17 February 1990) is a German diver who competes in the Men's 1 and 3 metre springboard.

He won the silver medal at the 2010 European Aquatics Championships in Budapest and at the 2011 European Diving Championships in Turin. At the 2012 Summer Olympics, he competed in the Men's 3m Springboard but a calamity occurred after he slipped off the board and landed hard on the water on his back, scoring him zero from the judges. The video of his dive quickly became popular on the internet.

At the 2016 Summer Olympics, he competed in the men's 3 m springboard where he finished 17th in the semifinal and did not qualify for the final. He also competed in the men's synchronized 3 m springboard with teammate Patrick Hausding. They finished in 4th place.

Feck is trained by Uwe Fischer, the father of Heike Fischer.
