= Maicol Verzotto =

Italian diver (born 1988)

Personal information
- Nationality: Italian
- Born: 24 May 1988 (age 38) Bressanone, Italy
- Height: 1.74 m (5 ft 9 in)
- Weight: 68 kg (150 lb)

Sport
- Country: Italy
- Sport: Diving
- Event(s): 10 m, 3 m, 3 m synchro
- Club: Fiamme Oro
Medal record
World Championships
Bronze medal – third place	2015 Kazan	3 m mixed synchro
European Championships
Silver medal – second place	2016 London	Mixed 3 m synchro

Maicol Verzotto (born 24 May 1988) is an Italian diver. He is the first Italian male diver to win a synchronized medal in a World Championship. A member of the sporting federation Sport Federation Federazione Italiana Nuoto, he is sponsored by the Fiamme Oro – Bolzano Nuoto.
