= Vadim Kaptur =

Belarusian diver (born 1987)

Personal information
- Born: 12 July 1987 (age 38) Minsk, Soviet Union

Sport
- Sport: Diving
Medal record
Representing Belarus
European Aquatics Championships
Silver medal – second place	2008 Eindhoven	10 m synchro
Silver medal – second place	2014 Berlin	10 m synchro
Bronze medal – third place	2010 Budapest	10 m platform
Bronze medal – third place	2010 Budapest	10 m synchro
European Diving Championships
Bronze medal – third place	2015 Rostock	10 m platform

Vadim Kaptur (born 12 July 1987) is a Belarusian diver who competed at the 2008, 2012 and 2016 Summer Olympics.

He began diving in 1994 in Minsk. He competes for Dinamo Minsk, and his national coach is Viachaslau Khamulkin. He made his international debut in 1998.
