= Michele Benedetti (diver) =

Italian diver (born 1984)

Personal information
- Born: December 17, 1984 (age 41) Parma, Italy

Sport
- Sport: Diving
Medal record
Representing Italy
European Aquatics Championships
| Bronze medal – third place | 2006 Budapest | 10 m synchro |
European Diving Championships
| Bronze medal – third place | 2009 Torino | 3 m springboard |

Michele Benedetti (born 17 December 1984) is an Italian diver.

Benedetti is an athlete of the Gruppo Sportivo della Marina Militare

== Biography ==
He was born in Parma. In the 10 meters platform synchronized event he won the bronze medal at the 2006 European Championships and another bronze medal in the 3 meters springboard event at the 2009 European Diving Championships. He also finished twelfth in the 3 meters springboard event at the 2009 Fina World Championships.
