= 2013 European Diving Championships – Men's 3 metre springboard =

Diving competition

Men's 3 m springboard at the 2013 European Diving Championships
- Dates: June 20
- Competitors: 24 from 16 nations
- Winning points: 502.90

Medalists
gold medal	Ilya Zakharov	Russia
silver medal	Evgeny Kuznetsov	Russia
bronze medal	Patrick Hausding	Germany

The men's 3 m springboard competition at the 2013 European Diving Championships was held on June 20 with a preliminary round and the final.

== Results ==
The preliminary round was held at 09:00 and the final was held at 15:30.

Green denotes finalists

Rank	Diver	Nationality	Preliminary		Final	
Rank	Diver	Nationality	Points	Rank	Points	Rank
1st place, gold medalist(s)	Ilya Zakharov	Russia	439.70	2	502.90	1
2nd place, silver medalist(s)	Evgeny Kuznetsov	Russia	421.70	3	471.55	2
3rd place, bronze medalist(s)	Patrick Hausding	Germany	448.40	1	428.70	3
4	Illya Kvasha	Ukraine	415.50	5	427.85	4
5	Oleksandr Gorshkovozov	Ukraine	356.70	10	424.50	5
6	Sascha Klein	Germany	418.85	4	419.50	6
7	Yorick de Bruijn	Netherlands	362.45	9	409.85	7
8	Andrzej Rzeszutek	Poland	387.05	6	396.85	8
9	Espen Valheim	Norway	340.05	12	341.20	9
10	Chola Chanturia	Georgia	371.05	7	339.60	10
11	Constantin Blaha	Austria	368.45	8	324.85	11
12	Michele Benedetti	Italy	351.30	11	315.50	12
13	Espen Gilje Bergslien	Norway	338.95	13		
14	Joshua Dowd	Great Britain	334.25	14		
15	Jouni Kallunki	Finland	329.20	15		
16	Stefanos Paparounas	Greece	322.85	16		
17	Tommaso Rinaldi	Italy	314.40	17		
18	Andrei Pawluk	Belarus	309.80	18		
19	Nicolás García	Spain	308.80	19		
20	Oliver Dingley	Great Britain	298.80	20		
21	Vinko Paradzik	Sweden	276.25	21		
22	Benjamin Auffret	France	274.90	22		
23	Joey van Etten	Netherlands	266.15	23		
24	Fabian Brandl	Austria	242.10	24		
