= Oliver Dingley =

Irish-English diver

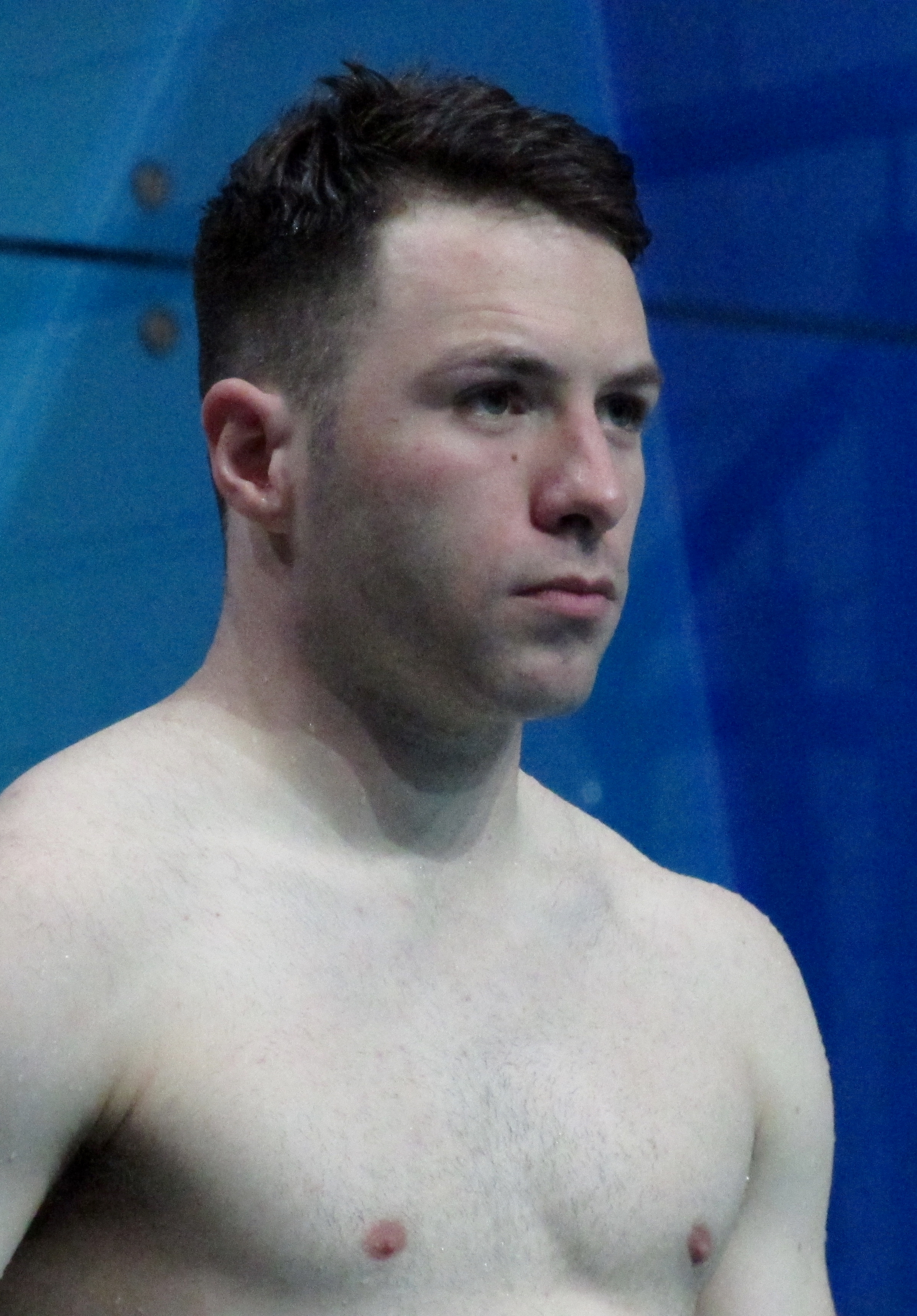

Personal information
- Nationality: Ireland; United Kingdom
- Born: 24 November 1992 (age 33) Harrogate, England
- Height: 5 ft 5 in (165 cm)
- Weight: 60 kg (130 lb)

Sport
- Country: Ireland
- Sport: Diving
- Event: Men's 3 metre springboard

Oliver Dingley (born 24 November 1992) is an international diver who represents Ireland. He represented Ireland at the 2016 Summer Olympics. In doing so, he became the first Irish Diver to compete at the Olympics in 68 years. RTÉ's highest rating sports event at the 2016 Olympics was Dingley's 3m springboard final, with an average of 388,000 viewers. Dingley has won numerous national and international medals.

== Career ==
Oliver Dingley is an Irish diver who came to prominence in 2008 when he became the youngest winner of the British Championships in the 1-metre springboard event, aged 15. He won several international medals during his career, including a bronze medal at the 2014 Commonwealth Games.

In February 2016, Dingley qualified for the 2016 Summer Olympics, becoming the first Irish diver to compete at the Olympics since 1948. At the Games, he became the first Irish diver to reach an Olympic final, finishing eighth in the men's 3-metre springboard event.

Dingley later competed at the Tokyo 2020 Olympics (held in 2021), after which he announced his retirement from competitive diving.
