= Diving at the 2023 Pan American Games – Qualification =

The following is the qualification system and qualified countries for the diving at the 2023 Pan American Games competition in Santiago, Chile.

== Qualification system ==
A total of up to 80 divers (40 per gender) will qualify to compete. A nation may enter a maximum of 10 divers (if entering teams in synchronized diving) or 6 athletes (if not entering teams in synchronized diving), with the exception of the winners of the 2021 Junior Pan American Games, provided that these athletes participate only in the event in which they qualified in Cali. The host nation (Chile) automatically qualified a full team of 10 athletes (five per gender). The top 18 men and women in individual events in the 2022 and 2023 FINA World Championships will secure spots for their NOCs. In addition, at each of the CONSANAT Championships (Zone 1) and the PAQ Qualifying Diving Championships (Zone 2), divers from federations competing in such events may earn a quota position for their NOCs provided that the total number of divers from such Zones do not exceed 24 divers on all boards (including those who are ranked in FINA from such competing federations but excluding any divers from CHI). Zone 3 and 4 divers do not have separate qualifiers within their zones. National championships or trials events in Zones 3 and 4 may be used to name divers to already qualified positions.

Zone	Men	Women	Total
Host	5	5	10
Zone 1	10	10	20*
Zone 2	10	10	20*
Zone 3	5	5	10
Zone 4	5	5	10
Total athletes	37	37	74

- minimum of 20 and up to 24 divers, each federation within Zone 1 limited to a maximum of 10 divers;
- minimum of 20 and up to 24 divers, each federation within Zone 2 limited to a maximum of 10 divers;

== Qualification timeline ==
Event	Date	Venue
2021 Junior Pan American Games	November 25 – December 5, 2021	Cali, Colombia
2022 World Aquatics Championships	June 26 – July 3, 2022	Budapest, Hungary
2022 South American Games	October 2–5, 2022	Asunción, Paraguay
PAQ Qualifying Diving Championships	February 18–26, 2023	León, Mexico
FINA Grand Prix Equivalent TBC -CAN/USA	May 2023	TBD
2023 World Aquatics Championships	July 14–30, 2023	Fukuoka, Japan

== Qualification summary ==
Nation	Synchronized diving				Individual diving						Total	
Nation	Men's 3 m	Men's 10 m	Women's 3 m	Women's 10m	Men's 1 m	Men's 3 m	Men's 10 m	Women's 1 m	Women's 3 m	Women's 10 m	Quotas	Athletes
Brazil				Yes	2	1	1	2	1	2	10	9
Canada		Yes	Yes	Yes	1		2	2	2	2	12	9
Chile					1	1					2	2
Colombia	Yes	Yes	Yes	Yes	2	2	2	2	2	2	16	10
Cuba	Yes	Yes	Yes		1	2	2	2	2	1	13	10
Dominican Republic					2	1	1			1	5	5
Jamaica					1	1					2	2
Mexico		Yes	Yes	Yes	3	1	3	2	3	3	18	14
Peru						1	1		1		3	3
Puerto Rico										1	1	1
United States	Yes	Yes	Yes	Yes	2	3	2	2	2	2	17	11
Venezuela						1			1		2	2
Total: 12 NOCs	3	5	5	5	15	14	14	12	14	14	101	80

== Individual diving ==
=== Men's 1 m springboard ===
For the individual events, one diver can only gain a single quota place per event for their NOC.

Competition	Places	Qualified divers
Host nation	~~2~~ 1	Chile (Donata Neglia)
2021 Junior Pan American Games	1	Mexico (Osmar Olvera Ibarra)
FINA World Championships	6	Colombia (Sebastián Morales); United States (Jordan Rzepka); Jamaica (Yona Knight-Wisdom); Dominican Republic (Jonathan Ruvalcaba); United States (Tyler Downs); Mexico (Kevin Muñoz)
2022 South American Games	~~3~~ 2	Colombia (Luis Uribe); Brazil (Rafael Fogaça)
PAQ Qualifying Diving Championships	~~3~~ 5	Mexico (Yolotl Martinez); Canada (Cédric Fofana); Dominican Republic (Jonathan Ruvalcaba); Brazil (Frandiel Gomez)*; Cuba (Laydel Dominguez)*
2023 World Aquatics Championships	TBD	
Total	15	

=== Men's 3 m springboard ===
For the individual events, one diver can only gain a single quota place per event for their NOC.

Competition	Places	Qualified divers
Host nation	~~2~~ 1	Chile (Diego Carquin)
2021 Junior Pan American Games	1	United States (Quentin Henninger)
FINA World Championships	5	Colombia (Luis Uribe); Brazil (Rafael Fogaça); Jamaica (Yona Knight-Wisdom); Cuba (Carlos Escalona); Colombia (Sebastián Morales)
2022 South American Games	~~3~~ 2	Peru (Ricardo Liranzo); Venezuela (Jesus Gonzalez)*
PAQ Qualifying Diving Championships	3	Dominican Republic (Jonathan Ruvalcaba); Mexico (Kevin Muñoz); Cuba (Laydel Dominguez)
2023 World Aquatics Championships	TBD	
Total	12	

=== Men's 10 m platform ===
For the individual events, one diver can only gain a single quota place per event for their NOC.

Competition	Places	Qualified divers
Host nation	~~2~~ 0	–
2021 Junior Pan American Games	1	Mexico (Randal Willars)
FINA World Championships	7	Canada (Nathan Zsombor-Murray); Canada (Rylan Wiens); United States (Josh Hedberg); United States (Zachary Cooper); Brazil (Isaac Souza); Cuba (Carlos Ramos); Cuba (Luis Cañabate)
2022 South American Games	3	Colombia (Sebastián Villa); Peru (Ricardo Liranzo); Colombia (Alejandro Solarte)
PAQ Qualifying Diving Championships	3	Mexico (Diego Balleza); Dominican Republic (Jonathan Ruvalcaba); Mexico (Yolotl Martinez)*
2023 World Aquatics Championships	TBD	
Total	14	

=== Women's 1 m springboard ===
For the individual events, one diver can only gain a single quota place per event for their NOC.

Competition	Places	Qualified divers
Host nation	~~2~~ 0	–
2021 Junior Pan American Games	1	Cuba (Anisley García)
FINA World Championships	4	United States (Sarah Bacon); Canada (Mia Vallée); Canada (Margo Erlam); United States (Brooke Schultz)
2022 South American Games	3	Brazil (Anna Lucia Dos Santos); Brazil (Luana Lira); Colombia (Diana Pineda)
PAQ Qualifying Diving Championships	3	Mexico (Paola Pineda); Mexico (Arantxa Chávez); Cuba (Prisis Ruiz)
2023 World Aquatics Championships	TBD	
Total	11	

=== Women's 3 m springboard ===
For the individual events, one diver can only gain a single quota place per event for their NOC.

Competition	Places	Qualified divers
Host nation	~~2~~ 0	–
2021 Junior Pan American Games	1	Mexico (Frida Zuñiga Guzman)
FINA World Championships	5	Canada (Mia Vallée); United States (Sarah Bacon); United States (Kristen Hayden); Brazil (Luana Lira); Mexico (Arantxa Chávez)
2022 South American Games	~~3~~ 3*	Colombia (Viviana Uribe); Colombia (Diana Zapata); Peru (Ana Ricci)*
PAQ Qualifying Diving Championships	~~3~~ 5	Canada (Pamela Ware); Mexico (Carolina Mendoza); Cuba (Anisley García); Venezuela (Elizabeth Pérez)*; Cuba (Prisis Ruiz)*
2023 World Aquatics Championships	TBD	
Total	14	

=== Women's 10 m platform ===
For the individual events, one diver can only gain a single quota place per event for their NOC.

Competition	Places	Qualified divers
Host nation	~~2~~ 0	–
2021 Junior Pan American Games	1	Mexico (Alejandra Estudillo)
FINA World Championships	7	Brazil (Ingrid Oliveira); Canada (Caeli McKay); United States (Daryn Wright); Puerto Rico (Maycey Vieta); United States (Maggie Merriman); Mexico (Viviana Del Ángel); Cuba (Anisley García)
2022 South American Games	3	Colombia (Viviana Uribe); Brazil (Andressa De Lima); Colombia (Mariana Osorio)
PAQ Qualifying Diving Championships	~~3~~ 3*	Canada (Éloïse Bélanger); Mexico (Abril Navarro); Dominican Republic (Victoria Garza)*
2023 World Aquatics Championships	TBD	
Total	14	
