= 2021 FINA Diving World Cup – Results =

The diving competitions at the 2021 FINA Diving World Cup at Tokyo, Japan took place at the Tokyo Aquatics Centre from 1 to 6 May 2021. The event serves the final qualifying diving event for the 2020 Summer Olympics (top 4 non-qualified divers for synchronised events, top 18 non-qualified divers for individual events).

== Schedule ==
Day	Date	Event	Time
1	1 May	3m Synchro Prelim (Women's)	10:00
1	1 May	10m Synchro Prelim (Men's)	12:30
1	1 May	3m Synchro Finals (Women's)	16:00
1	1 May	Victory Ceremony	
1	1 May	10m Synchro Finals (Men's)	18:00
1	1 May	Victory Ceremony	
2	2 May	10m Synchro Prelim (Women's)	10:00
2	2 May	3m Synchro Prelim (Men's)	12:30
2	2 May	10m Synchro Finals (Women's)	16:00
2	2 May	Victory Ceremony	
2	2 May	3m Synchro Finals (Men's)	18:00
2	2 May	Victory Ceremony	
3	3 May	3m Prelims (Women's)	9:00
3	3 May	10m Prelims (Men's)	12:30
3	3 May	3m Semi-finals (Women's)	16:45
3	3 May	10m Semi-finals (Men's)	18:45
4	4 May	10m Prelims (Women's)	10:00
4	4 May	3m Finals (Women's)	16:00
4	4 May	Victory Ceremony	
4	4 May	10m Finals (Men's)	18:00
4	4 May	Victory Ceremony	
5	5 May	3m Prelims (Men's)	10:00
5	5 May	10m Semi-finals (Women's)	16:00
5	5 May	10m Finals (Women's)	18:00
5	5 May	Victory Ceremony	
6	6 May	3m Semi-finals (Men's)	10:00
6	6 May	3m Finals (Men's)	16:00
6	6 May	Victory Ceremony	

== Results ==
=== Synchronised ===
==== Men's Synchronised 3m springboard ====
Green denotes finalists

Divers bolded denotes they have qualified for Olympics by dint of this result

Rank	Nation	Divers	Preliminary		Final	
Rank	Nation	Divers	Points	Rank	Points	Rank
1st place, gold medalist(s)	Great Britain	Daniel Goodfellow; Jack Laugher	396.60	3	440.94	1
2nd place, silver medalist(s)	Germany	**Patrick Hausding**; **Lars Rüdiger**	400.44	2	433.92	2
3rd place, bronze medalist(s)	Russia	**Evgeny Kuznetsov**; **Nikita Shleikher**	421.92	1	415.86	3
4	United States	**Andrew Capobianco**; **Michael Hixon**	394.25	4	414.18	4
5	Italy	**Lorenzo Marsaglia**; **Giovanni Tocci**	371.10	7	412.68	5
6	Spain	Adrían Abadía; Nicolás García	371.25	6	387.63	6
7	Malaysia	Chew Yiwei; Ooi Tze Liang	336.21	11	385.50	7
8	Mexico	Yahel Castillo; Juan Celaya	379.56	5	380.49	8
9	Colombia	Sebastián Morales; Daniel Restrepo	350.43	9	380.46	9
10	Ukraine	Oleksandr Gorshkovozov; Oleh Kolodiy	348.03	10	374.16	10
11	Poland	Kacper Lesiak; Andrzej Rzeszutek	369.27	8	355.05	11
12	Austria	Alex Hart; Nikolaj Schaller	334.98	12	327.66	12
13	Dominican Republic	Frandiel Gómez; José Ruvalcaba	321.87	13	did not advance	
14	Georgia	Sandro Melikidze; Tornike Onikashvili	310.23	14	did not advance	
15	Kuwait	Abdulrahman Abbas; Hassan Qali	297.36	15	did not advance	
16	South Korea	Kim Yeong-nam; Woo Ha-ram	296.10	16	did not advance	

==== Men's Synchronised 10m platform ====
Green denotes finalists

Divers bolded denotes they have qualify for Olympics

Rank	Nation	Divers	Preliminary		Final	
Rank	Nation	Divers	Points	Rank	Points	Rank
1st place, gold medalist(s)	Great Britain	Tom Daley; Matty Lee	441.72	1	453.60	1
2nd place, silver medalist(s)	Mexico	**Iván García**; **Randal Willars**	385.98	3	405.69	2
3rd place, bronze medalist(s)	Canada	**Vincent Riendeau**; **Nathan Zsombor-Murray**	389.64	2	393.81	3
4	Ukraine	**Oleh Serbin**; **Oleksii Sereda**	369.42	7	393.54	4
5	South Korea	**Kim Yeong-nam**; **Woo Ha-ram**	372.33	6	383.43	5
6	Germany	Patrick Hausding; Timo Barthel	375.42	5	382.14	6
7	Russia	Aleksandr Belevtsev; Ruslan Ternovoi	358.68	8	379.44	7
8	United States	David Dinsmore; Brandon Loschiavo	379.08	4	369.18	8
9	Malaysia	Jellson Jabillin; Hanis Nazirul	349.74	9	359.82	9
10	Greece	Nikos Molvalis; Athanasios Tsirikos	341.76	10	350.28	10
11	Japan	Hiroki Ito; Kazuki Murakami	339.00	11	344.37	11
12	Italy	Andreas Sargent Larsen; Eduard Timbretti Gugiu	337.53	12	344.91	12
13	Brazil	Kawan Pereira; Isaac Souza	329.16	13	did not advance	
14	Dominican Republic	Frandiel Gómez; José Ruvalcaba	321.30	14	did not advance	
15	Singapore	Jonathan Chan; Max Lee	318.18	15	did not advance	
16	Armenia	Vartan Bayanduryan; Vladimir Harutyunyan	315.78	16	did not advance	
17	Venezuela	Óscar Ariza; Jesús González	315.12	17	did not advance	

==== Women's Synchronised 3m springboard ====
Green denotes finalists

Divers bolded denotes they have qualified for the Olympics

Rank	Nation	Divers	Preliminary		Final	
Rank	Nation	Divers	Points	Rank	Points	Rank
1st place, gold medalist(s)	China	Chang Yani; Chen Yiwen	317.46	1	317.16	1
2nd place, silver medalist(s)	Canada	Jennifer Abel; Mélissa Citrini-Beaulieu	294.48	2	289.98	2
3rd place, bronze medalist(s)	Italy	**Elena Bertocchi**; **Chiara Pellacani**	268.62	6	283.77	3
4	Germany	**Lena Hentschel**; **Tina Punzel**	263.52	8	281.70	4
5	United States	**Sarah Bacon**; **Kassidy Cook**	273.24	5	278.49	5
6	Great Britain	**Katherine Torrance**; **Grace Reid**	273.30	4	276.00	6
7	Russia	Kristina Ilinykh; Maria Poliakova	273.33	3	272.94	7
8	Japan	Haruka Enomoto; Hazuki Miyamoto	267.90	7	270.00	8
9	Mexico	Paola Espinosa; Melany Hernández	257.40	10	264.60	9
10	Netherlands	Inge Jansen; Celine van Duijn	263.10	9	263.40	10
11	Switzerland	Madeline Coquoz; Jessica Favre	233.55	12	258.90	11
12	South Korea	Cho Eun-bi; Kim Su-ji	242.49	11	247.47	12
13	Ukraine	Anna Arnautova; Viktoriya Kesar	227.55	13	did not advance	
14	Puerto Rico	Maycey Vieta; Elizabeth Miclau	218.55	14	did not advance	
15	Malaysia	Nur Dhabitah Sabri; Ng Yan Yee	217.95	15	did not advance	
16	Brazil	Luana Lira; Anna Lucia Rodriguez Martins	216.21	16	did not advance	

==== Women's Synchronised 10m platform ====
Green denotes finalists

Divers bolded denotes they have qualify for Olympics

Rank	Nation	Divers	Preliminary		Final	
Rank	Nation	Divers	Points	Rank	Points	Rank
1st place, gold medalist(s)	Canada	**Meaghan Benfeito**; **Caeli McKay**	285.09	6	305.94	1
2nd place, silver medalist(s)	Great Britain	**Eden Cheng**; **Lois Toulson**	297.66	3	302.88	2
3rd place, bronze medalist(s)	Germany	**Tina Punzel**; **Christina Wassen**	290.94	4	292.86	3
4	Malaysia	Leong Mun Yee; Pandelela Rinong	290.70	5	288.36	4
5	Mexico	**Gabriela Agúndez**; **Alejandra Orozco**	312.54	1	286.56	5
6	Russia	Ekaterina Beliaeva; Yulia Timoshinina	309.90	2	286.26	6
7	Japan	Matsuri Arai; Minami Itahashi	280.38	7	281.58	7
8	Ukraine	Kseniia Bailo; Sofiya Lyskun	270.90	8	272.94	8
9	Italy	Noemi Batki; Chiara Pellacani	262.80	9	268.26	9
10	South Korea	Kwon Ha-lim; Moon Na-yun	259.77	10	258.57	10
11	Norway	Anne Tuxen; Helle Tuxen	253.23	11	241.68	11

=== Individual ===
==== Men's 3m springboard ====
Green denotes finalists

Blue denotes semifinalists

Divers bolded denotes they have qualify for Olympics via this result. Divers in the first 18 places unbolded have already qualified, or his nation has already reached its maximum allocation.

Rank	Diver	Nationality	Preliminary		Semifinal		Final	
Rank	Diver	Nationality	Points	Rank	Points	Rank	Points	Rank
1st place, gold medalist(s)	**Martin Wolfram**	Germany	446.95	3	451.30	3	467.75	1
2nd place, silver medalist(s)	James Heatly	Great Britain	478.20	2	441.60	4	461.25	2
3rd place, bronze medalist(s)	**Alexis Jandard**	France	433.35	4	415.95	5	434.25	3
4	**Nicolás García**	Spain	408.45	12	406.35	8	421.85	4
5	Daniel Goodfellow	Great Britain	487.50	1	481.80	1	420.15	5
6	**José Ruvalcaba**	Dominican Republic	401.90	14	403.50	11	415.70	6
7	Briadam Herrera	United States	411.35	10	393.40	12	411.40	7
8	Sebastián Morales	Colombia	411.80	9	406.25	9	409.60	8
9	**Rodrigo Diego**	Mexico	420.50	7	466.65	2	401.95	9
10	**Anton Down-Jenkins**	New Zealand	418.80	8	412.45	6	393.25	10
11	Woo Ha-ram	South Korea	431.40	5	404.60	10	388.85	11
12	**Yona Knight-Wisdom**	Jamaica	405.20	13	406.80	7	383.70	12
13	**Lorenzo Marsaglia**	Italy	389.50	18	393.15	13	did not advance	
14	**Kim Yeong-nam**	South Korea	399.75	15	384.90	14	did not advance	
15	**Alberto Arévalo**	Spain	425.20	6	375.90	15	did not advance	
16	**Thomas Ciprick**	Canada	391.90	17	358.35	16	did not advance	
17	Oliver Dingley	Ireland	399.75	16	351.35	17	did not advance	
18	Mohab El-Kordy	Egypt	410.90	11	351.15	18	did not advance	
19	Haruki Suyama	Japan	385.15	19	did not advance			
20	Alex Hart	Austria	378.05	20	did not advance			
21	Jonathan Suckow	Switzerland	373.90	21	did not advance			
22	Giovanni Tocci	Italy	370.55	22	did not advance			
23	Muhammad Syafiq Puteh	Malaysia	367.35	23	did not advance			
24	Jahir Ocampo	Mexico	365.40	24	did not advance			
25	Donato Neglia	Chile	363.60	25	did not advance			
26	Yury Naurozau	Belarus	362.25	26	did not advance			
27	Athanasios Tsirikos	Greece	347.30	27	did not advance			
28	Luis Moura	Brazil	356.80	28	did not advance			
29	Stanislav Oliferchyk	Ukraine	345.20	29	did not advance			
30	Frandiel Gómez	Dominican Republic	340.80	30	did not advance			
31	Alexander Lube	Germany	340.40	31	did not advance			
32	Nikolaj Schaller	Austria	335.40	32	did not advance			
33	Kacper Lesiak	Poland	335.30	33	did not advance			
34	Luis Uribe	Colombia	333.80	34	did not advance			
35	Chola Chanturia	Georgia	332.75	35	did not advance			
36	Botond Bóta	Hungary	332.40	36	did not advance			
37	Oleksandr Gorshkovozov	Ukraine	327.75	37	did not advance			
38	Mark Lee	Singapore	323.10	38	did not advance			
39	Diego Carquín	Chile	319.95	39	did not advance			
40	Emanuel Vázquez	Puerto Rico	318.20	40	did not advance			
41	Theofilos Afthinos	Greece	317.30	41	did not advance			
42	Guillaume Dutoit	Switzerland	317.10	42	did not advance			
43	Chew Yiwei	Malaysia	315.10	43	did not advance			
44	Ian Matos	Brazil	309.85	44	did not advance			
45	Timothy Lee	Singapore	303.50	45	did not advance			
46	Mojtaba Valipour	Iran	302.35	46	did not advance			
47	Hiroki Ito	Japan	297.30	47	did not advance			
48	Sandro Melikidze	Georgia	288.70	48	did not advance			
49	Andrzej Rzeszutek	Poland	285.70	49	did not advance			
50	Sulaiman Al-Sabe	Kuwait	284.25	50	did not advance			
51	Nathan Baeckeland	Belgium	280.20	51	did not advance			
52	Hamid Karimi	Iran	266.05	52	did not advance			
53	Martin Bang Christensen	Denmark	259.10	53	did not advance			
54	Abdulrahman Abbas	Kuwait	230.35	54	did not advance			

==== Men's 10m platform ====
Green denotes finalists

Blue denotes semifinalists

Divers bolded denotes they have qualify for Olympics (so far) via this result. Divers in the first 18 places unbolded have already qualified, or his nation has already reached its maximum allocation.

Rank	Diver	Nationality	Preliminary		Semifinal		Final	
Rank	Diver	Nationality	Points	Rank	Points	Rank	Points	Rank
1st place, gold medalist(s)	Tom Daley	Great Britain	508.30	1	503.35	2	541.70	1
2nd place, silver medalist(s)	**Randal Willars**	Mexico	483.65	2	467.85	4	514.70	2
3rd place, bronze medalist(s)	**Rylan Wiens**	Canada	424.70	9	419.85	10	488.55	3
4	**Timo Barthel**	Germany	402.70	16	427.00	7	465.90	4
5	Nathan Zsombor-Murray	Canada	415.85	12	477.00	3	462.10	5
6	Matthew Dixon	Great Britain	428.40	7	422.30	8	437.80	6
7	**Jaden Eikermann Gregorchuk**	Germany	441.10	6	458.95	5	429.35	7
8	**Rikuto Tamai**	Japan	405.20	15	421.30	9	424.00	8
9	Ruslan Ternovoi	Russia	465.70	3	511.95	1	420.30	9
10	**Kawan Pereira**	Brazil	456.05	4	448.80	6	409.90	10
11	**Sebastián Villa**	Colombia	406.15	14	404.45	12	407.65	11
12	Zachary Cooper	United States	420.60	10	418.10	11	384.20	12
13	**Rafael Quintero**	Puerto Rico	455.10	5	404.10	13	did not advance	
14	**Óscar Ariza**	Venezuela	394.35	17	402.90	14	did not advance	
15	**Kim Yeong-taek**	South Korea	417.00	11	393.05	15	did not advance	
16	Matthieu Rosset	France	414.05	13	377.10	16	did not advance	
17	Reo Nishida	Japan	392.00	18	328.80	17	did not advance	
18	**Isaac Souza**	Brazil	427.55	8	327.45	18	did not advance	
19	Alejandro Solarte	Colombia	382.70	19	did not advance			
20	Oleh Serbin	Ukraine	380.50	20	did not advance			
21	Aleksandr Belevtsev	Russia	380.15	21	did not advance			
22	Andreas Sargent Larsen	Italy	378.95	22	did not advance			
23	José Ruvalcaba	Dominican Republic	372.30	23	did not advance			
24	Jonathan Chan	Singapore	371.80	24	did not advance			
25	Vartan Bayanduryan	Armenia	370.30	25	did not advance			
26	Constantin Popovici	Romania	369.30	26	did not advance			
27	Yi Jae-gyeong	South Korea	367.65	27	did not advance			
28	Vinko Paradzik	Sweden	354.50	28	did not advance			
29	Artsiom Barouski	Belarus	354.25	29	did not advance			
30	Carlos Daniel Ramos	Cuba	347.85	30	did not advance			
31	Maicol Verzotto	Italy	347.35	31	did not advance			
32	Nikolaos Molvalis	Greece	341.85	32	did not advance			
33	Emanuel Vázquez	Puerto Rico	339.20	33	did not advance			
34	Jellson Jabillin	Malaysia	336.90	34	did not advance			
35	Athanasios Tsirikos	Greece	332.35	35	did not advance			
36	Nathan Brown	New Zealand	324.05	36	did not advance			
37	Dariush Lotfi	Austria	321.65	37	did not advance			
38	Jesús González	Venezuela	312.15	38	did not advance			
39	Héctor Pérez	Spain	311.60	39	did not advance			
40	Vladimir Harutyunyan	Armenia	308.50	40	did not advance			
41	Siddharth Bajrang Pardeshi	India	302.90	41	did not advance			
42	Youssef Ezzat	Egypt	297.15	42	did not advance			
43	Hanis Nazirul	Malaysia	283.80	43	did not advance			
44	Carlos Camacho	Spain	283.50	44	did not advance			
45	Yevhen Naumenko	Ukraine	281.65	45	did not advance			
46	Mojtaba Valipour	Iran	263.05	46	did not advance			

==== Women's 3m springboard ====
Green denotes finalists

Blue denotes semifinalists

Divers bolded denotes they have qualify for Olympics (so far) via this result. Divers in the first 18 places unbolded have already qualified, or his nation has already reached its maximum allocation.

Rank	Diver	Nationality	Preliminary		Semifinal		Final	
Rank	Diver	Nationality	Points	Rank	Points	Rank	Points	Rank
1st place, gold medalist(s)	Chen Yiwen	China	346.15	2	385.10	1	383.55	1
2nd place, silver medalist(s)	**Sarah Bacon**	United States	334.00	3	344.50	2	348.75	2
3rd place, bronze medalist(s)	Chang Yani	China	350.50	1	287.40	10	344.40	3
4	**Aranza Vázquez**	Mexico	309.45	5	330.75	4	327.60	4
5	Jennifer Abel	Canada	317.10	4	335.40	3	316.05	5
6	Sayaka Mikami	Japan	298.75	7	294.60	5	307.20	6
7	**Scarlett Mew Jensen**	Great Britain	285.65	12	290.00	7	304.95	7
8	**Haruka Enomoto**	Japan	294.45	9	291.60	6	299.10	8
9	**Anna Pysmenska**	Ukraine	297.45	8	282.35	12	288.45	9
10	**Michelle Heimberg**	Switzerland	289.35	11	286.65	11	283.75	10
11	Ng Yan Yee	Malaysia	275.10	14	288.30	8	271.20	11
12	**Samantha Pickens**	United States	298.90	6	288.30	8	255.00	12
13	**Kim Su-ji**	South Korea	272.10	18	282.00	13	did not advance	
14	Nur Dhabitah Sabri	Malaysia	279.50	13	277.25	14	did not advance	
15	**Julia Vincent**	South Africa	273.30	17	270.00	15	did not advance	
16	Maria Papworth	Great Britain	274.60	15	268.35	16	did not advance	
17	**Emma Gullstrand**	Sweden	294.25	10	261.50	17	did not advance	
18	**Luana Lira**	Brazil	274.40	16	233.80	18	did not advance	
19	Alena Khamulkina	Belarus	271.80	19	did not advance			
20	Mariia Poliakova	Russia	271.55	20	did not advance			
21	Pamela Ware	Canada	269.30	21	did not advance			
22	Anna Arnautova	Ukraine	266.40	22	did not advance			
23	Diana Pineda	Colombia	266.15	23	did not advance			
24	Inge Jansen	Netherlands	265.95	24	did not advance			
25	Emilia Nilsson Garip	Sweden	250.55	25	did not advance			
26	Elizaveta Kuzina	Russia	249.30	26	did not advance			
27	Elizabeth Pérez	Venezuela	246.70	27	did not advance			
28	Elena Bertocchi	Italy	246.00	28	did not advance			
29	Chiara Pellacani	Italy	244.70	29	did not advance			
30	Valeria Antolino	Spain	244.55	30	did not advance			
31	Clare Cryan	Ireland	242.90	31	did not advance			
32	Rocío Velázquez	Spain	242.50	32	did not advance			
33	Viviana Uribe	Colombia	241.70	33	did not advance			
34	Micaela Bouter	South Africa	241.25	34	did not advance			
35	Marcela Marić	Croatia	241.10	35	did not advance			
36	Anne Tuxen	Norway	240.35	36	did not advance			
37	Cho Eun-bi	South Korea	239.60	37	did not advance			
38	Lena Hentschel	Germany	233.40	38	did not advance			
39	Fong Kay Yian	Singapore	232.55	39	did not advance			
40	Saskia Oettinghaus	Germany	231.05	40	did not advance			
41	Jessica Favre	Switzerland	220.35	41	did not advance			
42	Anna dos Santos	Brazil	219.20	42	did not advance			
43	Alison Maillard	Chile	214.45	43	did not advance			
44	Helle Tuxen	Norway	210.60	44	did not advance			
45	Maha Eissa	Egypt	195.20	45	did not advance			
46	Kaja Skrzek	Poland	193.85	46	did not advance			
47	Elizabeth Miclau	Puerto Rico	190.70	47	did not advance			
48	Ashlee Tan	Singapore	182.55	48	did not advance			

==== Women's 10m platform ====
Green denotes finalists

Blue denotes semifinalists

Divers bolded denotes they have qualify for Olympics (so far) via this result. Divers in the first 18 places unbolded have already qualified, or his nation has already reached its maximum allocation.

Rank	Diver	Nationality	Preliminary		Semifinal		Final	
Rank	Diver	Nationality	Points	Rank	Points	Rank	Points	Rank
1st place, gold medalist(s)	Pandelela Rinong	Malaysia	325.00	4	333.00	3	355.70	1
2nd place, silver medalist(s)	Matsuri Arai	Japan	319.80	5	319.20	5	342.00	2
3rd place, bronze medalist(s)	Caeli McKay	Canada	287.80	13	343.85	1	338.55	3
4	**Andrea Spendolini-Sirieix**	Great Britain	312.80	6	336.30	2	333.90	4
5	**Sarah Jodoin Di Maria**	Italy	270.60	17	297.90	11	324.65	5
6	**Yulia Timoshinina**	Russia	336.70	2	318.00	6	306.85	6
7	**Gabriela Agúndez**	Mexico	325.65	3	328.70	4	299.10	7
8	Montserrat Gutiérrez	Mexico	298.10	7	303.00	9	296.30	8
9	**Anna Konanykhina**	Russia	278.00	15	312.25	7	291.75	9
10	**Ingrid Oliveira**	Brazil	285.30	14	303.90	8	290.10	10
11	**Christina Wassen**	Germany	285.90	13	298.10	10	281.00	11
12	**Kwon Ha-lim**	South Korea	291.95	10	297.75	12	276.95	12
13	**Elena Wassen**	Germany	292.10	9	296.00	13	did not advance	
14	**Tanya Watson**	Ireland	271.85	16	295.50	14	did not advance	
15	**Freida Lim**	Singapore	289.60	11	272.35	15	did not advance	
16	Anne Tuxen	Norway	257.75	19	259.80	16	did not advance	
17	**Alaïs Kalonji**	France	260.60	18	256.15	17	did not advance	
18	**Cheong Jun Hoong**	Malaysia	345.30	1	237.35	18	did not advance	
19	Celine van Duijn	Netherlands	294.60	8	WD	–	did not advance	
20	Giovanna Pedroso	Brazil	256.90	20	did not advance			
21	Anisley García	Cuba	256.70	21	did not advance			
22	Maia Biginelli	Italy	253.10	22	did not advance			
23	Ciara McGing	Ireland	240.95	23	did not advance			
24	Mai Yasuda	Japan	239.60	24	did not advance			
25	Ksenia Bailo	Ukraine	234.90	25	did not advance			
26	Elizabeth Miclau	Puerto Rico	228.30	26	did not advance			
27	Maycey Vieta	Puerto Rico	226.60	27	did not advance			
28	Cho Eun-bi	South Korea	223.65	28	did not advance			
29	Maha Abdelsalam	Egypt	221.80	29	did not advance			
30	Helle Tuxen	Norway	220.80	30	did not advance			
31	Nicoleta-Angelica Muscalu	Romania	216.75	31	did not advance			
32	María Betancourt	Venezuela	211.65	32	did not advance			
33	Maïssam Naji	France	197.10	33	did not advance			
34	Lissette Ramírez	Venezuela	190.15	34	did not advance			
35	Yelizaveta Boroza	Kazakhstan	133.60	35	did not advance			
	Robyn Birch	Great Britain	WD	–	did not advance			
