= Diving at the 2020 Summer Olympics – Qualification =

Qualification for diving at the 2020 Summer Olympics allocated a total of 136 quota spots, evenly divided between men and women. The 2020 Olympics were postponed to 2021 due to the COVID-19 pandemic. Each nation may enter not more than 16 divers (up to eight males and eight females) with up to two in each individual event and a pair in each synchronized event. Athletes must be 14 years of age by the end of 2020 to compete.

== Timeline ==
Event	Date	Venue
2019 World Aquatics Championships	July 12–20, 2019	(South Korea) Gwangju
2019 Pan American Games	August 1–5, 2019	(Peru) Lima
2019 European Diving Championships	August 5–11, 2019	(Ukraine) Kyiv
2019 Asian Diving Cup	September 6–8, 2019	(Malaysia) Kuala Lumpur
2019 Oceania Diving Championships	December 12–15, 2019	(New Zealand) Auckland
2019 African Diving Qualifier	December 16–18, 2019	(South Africa) Durban
2021 FINA Diving World Cup	May 1–6, 2021	(Japan) Tokyo
Re-allocation of unused quota	TBA	—

== Qualification summary ==
For individual diving, the top twelve from the 2019 World Championships, the five continental champions and the eighteen semifinalists at the 2020 Diving World Cup will achieve a quota spot. For the pairs events, the top three from the world championships, the top four from the world cup and the hosts qualify. Additional quota places go to the next best finishers in the World Cup until the maximum number of divers (68 athletes per gender) is reached.

Nation	Synchronized diving				Individual diving				Total	
Nation	Men's 3 m	Men's 10 m	Women's 3 m	Women's 10m	Men's 3 m	Men's 10 m	Women's 3 m	Women's 10 m	Quotas	Athletes
Australia					1	2	2	2	7	7
Brazil						2	1	1	4	4
Canada		Yes	Yes	Yes	1	2	2	2	10	10
China	Yes	Yes	Yes	Yes	2	2	2	2	12	10
Colombia					2	1			3	3
Dominican Republic					1				1	1
Egypt					1	1		1	3	3
France					1	1		1	3	3
Great Britain	Yes	Yes	Yes	Yes	2	2	2	2	12	12
Germany	Yes		Yes	Yes	2	2	1	2	10	9
Italy	Yes		Yes		1			2	4	6
Ireland					1			1	2	2
Jamaica					1				1	1
Japan	Yes	Yes	Yes	Yes	1	2	2	1	10	11
Malaysia				Yes			2	2	5	5
Mexico	Yes	Yes	Yes	Yes	2	2	2	2	12	14
Norway								1	1	1
Netherlands							1	1	2	2
New Zealand					1				1	1
Puerto Rico						1			1	1
ROC	Yes	Yes			2	2	1	2	9	7
Singapore						1		1	2	2
South Africa							2		2	2
South Korea		Yes			2	2	1	1	7	5
Spain					2				2	2
Switzerland							1		1	1
Sweden							1		1	1
Ukraine		Yes			1	1	2	1	6	6
United States	Yes		Yes	Yes	2	2	2	2	11	11
Venezuela						1			1	1
Total: 30 NOCs	8	8	8	8	29	29	27	30	147	144

== Synchronized diving ==
=== Men's 3 m synchronized springboard ===
Competition	Places	Qualified teams
FINA World Championships	3	China; Great Britain; Mexico
FINA Diving World Cup	4	Germany; Italy; ROC; United States
Host nation	1	Japan
Total	8	

=== Men's 10 m synchronized platform ===
Competition	Places	Qualified teams
FINA World Championships	3	China; Great Britain; ROC
FINA Diving World Cup	4	Canada; Mexico; South Korea; Ukraine
Host nation	1	Japan
Total	8	

=== Women's 3 m synchronized springboard ===
Competition	Places	Qualified teams
FINA World Championships	3	China; Canada; Mexico
FINA Diving World Cup	4	Germany; Great Britain; Italy; United States
Host nation	1	Japan
Total	8	

=== Women's 10 m synchronized platform ===
Competition	Places	Qualified teams
FINA World Championships	3	China; Malaysia; United States
FINA Diving World Cup	4	Canada; Germany; Great Britain; Mexico
Host nation	1	Japan
Total	8	

== Individual diving ==
=== Men's 3 m springboard ===
For the individual events, one diver can only gain a single quota place per event for their NOC.

Competition	Places	Qualified divers
FINA World Championships	12	China (Xie Siyi); China (Wang Zongyuan); Great Britain (Jack Laugher); United States (Andrew Capobianco); ROC (Nikita Shleikher); Mexico (Rommel Pacheco); Colombia (Sebastián Morales); ROC (Evgeny Kuznetsov); Germany (Patrick Hausding); Ukraine (Oleh Kolodiy); South Korea (Woo Ha-ram); United States (Tyler Downs)
2019 Pan American Games	1	Colombia (Daniel Restrepo)
2019 European Diving Championships	1	Great Britain (James Heatly)
2019 Asian Diving Cup	1	Japan (Ken Terauchi)
2019 Oceania Diving Championships	1	Australia (Li Shixin)
2019 African Diving Qualifier	1	Egypt (Mohab El-Kordy)
FINA Diving World Cup	7	Germany (Martin Wolfram); France (Alexis Jandard); Mexico (Osmar Olvera); New Zealand (Anton Down-Jenkins); Spain (Nicolás García); Jamaica (Yona Knight-Wisdom); Dominican Republic (Jonathan Ruvalcaba)
Re-allocation of unused quota	5	Canada (Cedric Fofana); Italy (Lorenzo Marsaglia); Ireland (Oliver Dingley); South Korea (Kim Yeong-nam); Spain (Alberto Arévalo)
Total	29	

=== Men's 10 m platform ===
For the individual events, one diver can only gain a single quota place per event for their NOC.

Competition	Places	Qualified divers
FINA World Championships	11	China (Yang Jian); China (Cao Yuan); Great Britain (Tom Daley); South Korea (Woo Ha-ram); United States (Jordan Windle); Great Britain (Noah Williams); Ukraine (Oleksiy Sereda); ~~France (Benjamin Auffret)~~; United States (Brandon Loschiavo); ROC (Aleksandr Bondar); Canada (Nathan Zsombor-Murray); Australia (Cassiel Rousseau)
2019 Pan American Games	1	Mexico (Iván García)
2019 European Diving Championships	1	ROC (Viktor Minibaev)
2019 Asian Diving Cup	1	Singapore (Jonathan Chan)
2019 Oceania Diving Championships	1	Australia (Sam Fricker)
2019 African Diving Qualifier	1	Egypt (Mohab El-Kordy)
FINA Diving World Cup	8	Mexico (Andrés Villareal); Brazil (Kawan Pereira); Germany (Jaden Eikermann); Canada (Rylan Wiens); Colombia (Sebastián Villa); Japan (Rikuto Tamai); Germany (Timo Barthel); France (Matthieu Rosset)
Re-allocation of unused quota	5	Puerto Rico (Rafael Quintero); Venezuela (Óscar Ariza); South Korea (Kim Yeong-taek); Brazil (Isaac Souza); Japan (Reo Nishida)
Total	29	

=== Women's 3 m springboard ===
For the individual events, one diver can only gain a single quota place per event for their NOC.

Competition	Places	Qualified divers
FINA World Championships	12	China (Shi Tingmao); Australia (Anabelle Smith); China (Wang Han); Canada (Jennifer Abel); Germany (Tina Punzel); Canada (Pamela Ware); Japan (Sayaka Mikami); Great Britain (Grace Reid); Ukraine (Viktoriya Kesar); Malaysia (Ng Yan Yee); Netherlands (Inge Jansen); Australia (Esther Qin)
2019 Pan American Games	1	Mexico (Arantxa Chávez)
2019 European Diving Championships	1	ROC (Mariia Poliakova)
2019 Asian Diving Cup	1	Malaysia (Nur Dhabitah Sabri)
2019 Oceania Diving Championships	0	~~New Zealand (Elizabeth Cui)~~
2019 African Diving Qualifier	1	South Africa (Micaela Bouter)
FINA Diving World Cup	7	United States (Hailey Hernandez); Mexico (Aranza Vázquez); United States (Krysta Palmer); Ukraine (Anna Pysmenska); Japan (Haruka Enomoto); Switzerland (Michelle Heimberg); Great Britain (Scarlett Mew Jensen)
Re-allocation of unused quota	4	South Korea (Kim Su-ji); South Africa (Julia Vincent); Sweden (Emma Gullstrand); Brazil (Luana Lira)
Total	27	

=== Women's 10 m platform ===
For the individual events, one diver can only gain a single quota place per event for their NOC.

Competition	Places	Qualified divers
FINA World Championships	12	China (Chen Yuxi); China (Quan Hongchan); Canada (Celina Toth); Canada (Meaghan Benfeito); Italy (Noemi Batki); Australia (Melissa Wu); Great Britain (Lois Toulson); United States (Delaney Schnell); Malaysia (Pandelela Rinong); Japan (Matsuri Arai); Netherlands (Celine van Duijn); United States (Katrina Young)
2019 Pan American Games	1	Mexico (Alejandra Orozco)
2019 European Diving Championships	1	Ukraine (Sofiya Lyskun)
2019 Asian Diving Cup	0	~~North Korea (Kim Mi-rae)~~
2019 Oceania Diving Championships	1	Australia (Nikita Hains)
2019 African Diving Qualifier	1	Egypt (Maha Gouda)
FINA Diving World Cup	8	Great Britain (Andrea Spendolini-Sirieix); Italy (Sarah Jodoin Di Maria); ROC (Yulia Timoshinina); Mexico (Gabriela Agúndez); ROC (Anna Konanykhina); Brazil (Ingrid Oliveira); Germany (Christina Wassen); South Korea (Kwon Ha-lim)
Re-allocation of unused quota	6	Germany (Elena Wassen); Ireland (Tanya Watson); Singapore (Freida Lim); Malaysia (Cheong Jun Hoong); France (Alaïs Kalonji); Norway (Anne Tuxen)
Total	30	
