= Diving at the 2023 World Aquatics Championships – Men's 3 metre springboard =

Men's 3 metre springboard at the 2023 World Aquatics Championships
- Venue: Fukuoka Prefectural Pool
- Location: Fukuoka, Japan
- Dates: 19 July (preliminary and semifinal); 20 July (final)
- Competitors: 67 from 42 nations
- Winning points: 538.10

Medalists
gold medal	Wang Zongyuan	China
silver medal	Osmar Olvera	Mexico
bronze medal	Long Daoyi	China

The men's 3 metre springboard competition at the 2023 World Aquatics Championships was held on 19 and 20 July 2023.

== Results ==
The preliminary round was started on 19 July at 09:00. The semifinal was held on 19 July 15:30. The final was held on 20 July at 18:00.

Green denotes finalists

Blue denotes semifinalists

Rank	Diver	Nationality	Preliminary		Semifinal		Final	
Rank	Diver	Nationality	Points	Rank	Points	Rank	Points	Rank
1st place, gold medalist(s)	Wang Zongyuan	China	500.95	1	546.25	1	538.10	1
2nd place, silver medalist(s)	Osmar Olvera	Mexico	443.70	4	471.00	4	507.50	2
3rd place, bronze medalist(s)	Long Daoyi	China	452.75	3	495.80	2	499.75	3
4	Andrew Capobianco	United States	385.40	17	427.35	9	448.00	4
5	Rodrigo Diego	Mexico	419.65	7	446.45	6	439.80	5
6	Daniel Goodfellow	Great Britain	459.70	2	477.20	3	438.05	6
7	Moritz Wesemann	Germany	408.70	10	448.45	5	433.35	7
8	Lars Rudiger	Germany	407.35	11	409.70	12	408.25	8
9	Tyler Downs	United States	416.65	8	415.30	10	389.00	9
10	Daniel Restrepo	Colombia	385.65	16	410.90	11	382.80	10
11	Lorenzo Marsaglia	Italy	403.20	12	430.20	8	379.75	11
12	Giovanni Tocci	Italy	434.80	5	435.95	7	365.95	12
13	Jonathan Ruvalcaba	Dominican Republic	399.00	13	409.45	13	Did not advance	
14	Ooi Tze Liang	Malaysia	383.60	18	402.40	14	Did not advance	
15	Li Shixin	Australia	393.45	14	394.55	15	Did not advance	
16	Alexis Jandard	France	424.70	6	390.40	16	Did not advance	
17	Jules Bouyer	France	415.25	9	389.05	17	Did not advance	
18	Jonathan Suckow	Switzerland	385.95	15	369.10	18	Did not advance	
19	Woo Ha-ram	South Korea	382.40	19	Did not advance			
20	Liam Stone	New Zealand	381.25	20	Did not advance			
21	Carlos Escalona	Cuba	369.55	21	Did not advance			
22	Jordan Houlden	Great Britain	368.55	22	Did not advance			
23	Matej Neveščanin	Croatia	366.50	23	Did not advance			
24	Haruki Suyama	Japan	365.60	24	Did not advance			
25	Rafael Fogaça	Brazil	365.55	25	Did not advance			
26	Andrzej Rzeszutek	Poland	364.70	26	Did not advance			
27	Alexander Hart	Austria	363.95	27	Did not advance			
28	Oleh Kolodiy	Ukraine	362.35	28	Did not advance			
29	Luis Uribe	Colombia	360.85	29	Did not advance			
30	Avvir Tham	Singapore	359.60	30	Did not advance			
31	Nicolás García	Spain	359.05	31	Did not advance			
32	Nikolaj Schaller	Austria	358.50	32	Did not advance			
33	Yona Knight-Wisdom	Jamaica	356.65	33	Did not advance			
34	Anton Down-Jenkins	New Zealand	353.55	34	Did not advance			
35	Yi Jae-gyeong	South Korea	349.70	35	Did not advance			
36	Guillaume Dutoit	Switzerland	348.75	36	Did not advance			
37	Rafael Max	Brazil	346.70	37	Did not advance			
38	Danylo Konovalov	Ukraine	344.45	38	Did not advance			
39	Kacper Lesiak	Poland	339.85	39	Did not advance			
40	Emanuel Vázquez	Puerto Rico	332.50	40	Did not advance			
41	Alexandru Avasiloae	Romania	331.25	41	Did not advance			
42	Sandro Melikidze	Georgia	327.80	42	Did not advance			
43	Bryden Hattie	Canada	326.30	43	Did not advance			
44	David Ekdahl	Sweden	325.05	44	Did not advance			
45	Jake Passmore	Ireland	319.65	45	Did not advance			
46	Theofilos Afthinos	Greece	305.60	46	Did not advance			
47	Jesús González	Venezuela	305.45	47	Did not advance			
48	Yohan Eskrick-Parkinson	Jamaica	299.35	48	Did not advance			
49	David Ledinski	Croatia	297.35	49	Did not advance			
50	Chawanwat Juntaphadawon	Thailand	295.75	50	Did not advance			
51	Alberto Arévalo	Spain	294.25	51	Did not advance			
52	Adityo Restu Putra	Indonesia	291.40	52	Did not advance			
53	Elias Petersen	Sweden	285.50	53	Did not advance			
54	Diego Carquín	Chile	278.35	54	Did not advance			
55	Frandiel Gómez	Dominican Republic	278.00	55	Did not advance			
56	Curtis Yuen	Hong Kong	277.35	56	Did not advance			
57	Maori Pomeroy-Farrell	Fiji	276.45	57	Did not advance			
58	Jesús Liranzo	Peru	275.00	58	Did not advance			
59	Donato Neglia	Chile	274.35	59	Did not advance			
60	Mohab Ishak	Egypt	268.30	60	Did not advance			
61	Mohamed Farouk	Egypt	266.60	61	Did not advance			
62	Tri Anggoro Priambodo	Indonesia	258.55	62	Did not advance			
63	Martynas Lisauskas	Lithuania	246.05	63	Did not advance			
64	Athanasios Tsirikos	Greece	235.30	64	Did not advance			
65	Hemam London Singh	India	234.75	65	Did not advance			
66	Sebastian Konecki	Lithuania	222.60	66	Did not advance			
67	Abdulrahman Abbas	Kuwait	215.55	67	Did not advance			
	Gabriel Gilbert Daim	Malaysia	Did not start					
