= Diving at the 2023 Pan American Games – Men's 3 metre springboard =

Men's 3 metre springboard at the 2023 Pan American Games
- Venue: Aquatics Centre
- Dates: October 23
- Competitors: 22 from 12 nations
- Winning score: 536.15

Medalists
Gold medal	Osmar Olvera	Mexico
Silver medal	Luis Uribe	Colombia
Bronze medal	Jack Ryan	United States

The men's 3 metre springboard competition of the diving events at the 2023 Pan American Games was held on October 23 at the Aquatics Centre in Santiago, Chile. A total of 22 divers from 12 countries took part.

== Qualification ==
A total of up to 80 divers (40 per gender) across all events qualified to compete. A nation may enter a maximum of 10 divers (if entering teams in synchronized diving) or 6 athletes (if not entering teams in synchronized diving), with the exception of the winners of the 2021 Junior Pan American Games, provided that these athletes participate only in the event in which they qualified in Cali. The host nation (Chile) automatically qualified a full team of 10 athletes (five per gender). The top 18 men and women in individual events in the 2022 and 2023 FINA World Championships will secure spots for their NOCs. In addition, at each of the CONSANAT Championships (Zone 1) and the PAQ Qualifying Diving Championships (Zone 2), divers from federations competing in such events may earn a quota position for their NOCs provided that the total number of divers from such Zones do not exceed 24 divers on all boards (including those who are ranked in FINA from such competing federations but excluding any divers from CHI). Zone 3 and 4 divers do not have separate qualifiers within their zones. National championships or trials events in Zones 3 and 4 may be used to name divers to already qualified positions.

== Schedule ==
Date	Time	Round
October 23, 2023	11:00	Preliminary
October 23, 2023	20:40	Final

== Results ==
Green denotes finalists

Rank	Diver	Nationality	Preliminary		Final	
Rank	Diver	Nationality	Points	Rank	Points	Rank
1st place, gold medalist(s)	Osmar Olvera	Mexico	461.10	1	536.15	1
2nd place, silver medalist(s)	Luis Uribe	Colombia	411.25	4	444.25	2
3rd place, bronze medalist(s)	Jack Ryan	United States	406.40	5	435.35	3
4	Frank Rosales	Cuba	351.40	11	401.85	4
5	Daniel Restrepo	Colombia	402.40	6	392.20	5
6	Tyler Downs	United States	371.55	8	384.40	6
7	Frandiel Gómez	Dominican Republic	345.30	12	381.25	7
8	Jonathan Ruvalcaba	Dominican Republic	419.65	3	379.85	8
9	Rodrigo Diego	Mexico	433.60	2	378.25	9
10	Bryden Hattie	Canada	356.70	10	377.15	10
11	Yona Knight-Wisdom	Jamaica	385.85	7	372.10	11
12	Emanuel Vazquez	Puerto Rico	359.00	9	359.70	12
13	Donato Neglia	Chile	337.60	13	Did not advance	
14	Yohan Eskrick-Parkinson	Jamaica	330.35	14	Did not advance	
15	Diego Carquín	Chile	328.95	15	Did not advance	
16	Rafael Max	Brazil	328.00	16	Did not advance	
17	Thomas Ciprick	Canada	304.80	17	Did not advance	
18	Carlos Escalona	Cuba	267.10	18	Did not advance	
19	Rafael Fogaca	Brazil	264.40	19	Did not advance	
—	Diogo Silva	Brazil	Did not start			
—	Jesús Liranzo	Peru	Did not start			
—	Santiago Choez	Ecuador	Did not start			
