= Diving at the 2023 Pan American Games – Men's 1 metre springboard =

Men's 1 metre springboard at the 2023 Pan American Games
- Venue: Aquatics Centre
- Dates: October 21
- Competitors: 20 from 12 nations
- Winning score: 424.70

Medalists
Gold medal	Osmar Olvera	Mexico
Silver medal	Jonathan Ruvalcaba	Dominican Republic
Bronze medal	Luis Uribe	Colombia

The men's 1 metre springboard competition of the diving events at the 2023 Pan American Games was held on October 21 at the Aquatics Centre in Santiago, Chile. A total of 20 divers from 11 countries took part.

== Qualification ==
A total of up to 80 divers (40 per gender) across all events qualified to compete. A nation may enter a maximum of 10 divers (if entering teams in synchronized diving) or 6 athletes (if not entering teams in synchronized diving), with the exception of the winners of the 2021 Junior Pan American Games, provided that these athletes participate only in the event in which they qualified in Cali. The host nation (Chile) automatically qualified a full team of 10 athletes (five per gender). The top 18 men and women in individual events in the 2022 and 2023 FINA World Championships will secure spots for their NOCs. In addition, at each of the CONSANAT Championships (Zone 1) and the PAQ Qualifying Diving Championships (Zone 2), divers from federations competing in such events may earn a quota position for their NOCs provided that the total number of divers from such Zones do not exceed 24 divers on all boards (including those who are ranked in FINA from such competing federations but excluding any divers from CHI). Zone 3 and 4 divers do not have separate qualifiers within their zones. National championships or trials events in Zones 3 and 4 may be used to name divers to already qualified positions.

== Schedule ==
Date	Time	Round
October 21, 2023	10:00	Preliminary
October 21, 2023	19:40	Final

== Results ==
Green denotes finalists

Rank	Diver	Nationality	Preliminary		Final	
Rank	Diver	Nationality	Points	Rank	Points	Rank
1st place, gold medalist(s)	Osmar Olvera	Mexico	366.00	3	424.70	1
2nd place, silver medalist(s)	Jonathan Ruvalcaba	Dominican Republic	374.40	2	384.90	2
3rd place, bronze medalist(s)	Luis Uribe	Colombia	339.80	7	371.20	3
4	Lyle Yost	United States	382.65	1	365.35	4
5	Jesús Liranzo	Peru	348.15	5	361.45	5
6	Luis Cañabate Alvarez	Cuba	354.20	4	357.20	6
7	Jack Ryan	United States	341.65	6	339.50	7
8	Daniel Restrepo	Colombia	322.70	11	339.35	8
9	Donato Neglia	Chile	324.40	10	336.15	9
10	Frandiel Gómez	Dominican Republic	317.20	12	335.00	10
11	Yona Knight-Wisdom	Jamaica	316.10	13	318.60	11
12	Rafael Fogaça	Brazil	333.30	8	236.85	12
13	Thomas Ciprick	Canada	327.60	9	Withdrew	
14	Jesus Gonzalez Reyes	Venezuela	315.60	14	Did not advance	
15	Rodrigo Lopez	Mexico	314.10	15	Did not advance	
16	Carlos Escalona Castañeda	Cuba	313.35	16	Did not advance	
17	Rafael Max	Brazil	310.90	17	Did not advance	
18	Yohan Esrick-Parkinson	Jamaica	283.90	18	Did not advance	
19	Diego Carquín	Chile	243.90	19	Did not advance	
—	Santiago Choez	Ecuador	Did not start			
