= Diving at the 2023 World Aquatics Championships – Team event =

Team event at the 2023 World Aquatics Championships
- Venue: Fukuoka Prefectural Pool
- Location: Fukuoka, Japan
- Dates: 18 July
- Competitors: 55 from 14 nations
- Teams: 14
- Winning points: 489.65

Medalists
gold medal	Bai Yuming; Si Yajie; Zhang Minjie; Zheng Jiuyuan	China
silver medal	Gabriela Agúndez; Jahir Ocampo; Aranza Vázquez; Randal Willars	Mexico
bronze medal	Timo Barthel; Lena Hentschel; Christina Wassen; Moritz Wesemann	Germany

The team event diving competition at the 2023 World Aquatics Championships was held on 18 July 2023.

== Results ==
The final was started at 11:00.

Rank	Nation	Divers	Points
1st place, gold medalist(s)	China	Bai Yuming; Zheng Jiuyuan; Si Yajie; Zhang Minjie	489.65
2nd place, silver medalist(s)	Mexico	Gabriela Agúndez; Jahir Ocampo; Randal Willars; Aranza Vázquez	455.35
3rd place, bronze medalist(s)	Germany	Timo Barthel; Lena Hentschel; Christina Wassen; Moritz Wesemann	432.15
4	Australia	Nikita Hains; Maddison Keeney; Cassiel Rousseau; Li Shixin	426.15
5	United States	Krysta Palmer; Jack Ryan; Jessica Parratto; Jordan Rzepka	421.40
6	Spain	Rocío Velázquez; Alberto Arévalo; Carlos Camacho; Valeria Antolino	400.00
7	Italy	Sarah Jodoin Di Maria; Lorenzo Marsaglia; Chiara Pellacani; Eduard Timbretti Gugiu	365.85
8	South Korea	Kim Su-ji; Yi Jae-gyeong; Cho Eun-bi; Kim Yeong-taek	345.60
9	Cuba	Anisley García; Carlos Escalona; Prisis Ruiz; Carlos Ramos	341.50
10	Malaysia	Nur Eilisha Rania Muhammad Abrar Raj; Kimberly Bong; Jeilson Jabillin; Hanis Jaya Surya	320.00
11	Brazil	Luana Lira; Ingrid Oliveira; Isaac Souza; Rafael Fogaça	298.70
12	Indonesia	Andriyan; Gladies Lariesa Garina Haga; Adityo Restu Putra	274.00
13	New Zealand	Mikali Dawson; Anton Down-Jenkins; Elizabeth Roussel; Luke Sipkes	270.90
14	Macau	Choi Sut Kuan; He Heung Wing; Lo Ka Wai; Zhang Hoi	225.75
