= Diving at the 2023 Pan American Games – Men's synchronized 10 metre platform =

Men's synchronized 10 metre platform at the 2023 Pan American Games
- Venue: Aquatics Centre
- Dates: October 22
- Competitors: 12 from 6 nations
- Winning score: 419.94

Medalists
| Gold medal | Kevin Berlín; Randal Willars | Mexico |
| Silver medal | Rylan Wiens; Nathan Zsombor-Murray | Canada |
| Bronze medal | Sebastián Villa; Alejandro Solarte | Colombia |

The men's synchronized 10 metre platform competition of the diving events at the 2023 Pan American Games was held on October 21 at the Aquatics Centre in Santiago, Chile. A total of 12 divers from 6 countries took part.

== Schedule ==
| Date | Time | Round |
|---|---|---|
| October 22, 2023 | 18:00 | Final |

== Qualification ==
A total of up to 80 divers (40 per gender) across all events qualified to compete. A nation may enter a maximum of 10 divers (if entering teams in synchronized diving) or 6 athletes (if not entering teams in synchronized diving), with the exception of the winners of the 2021 Junior Pan American Games, provided that these athletes participate only in the event in which they qualified in Cali. The host nation (Chile) automatically qualified a full team of 10 athletes (five per gender). The top 18 men and women in individual events in the 2022 and 2023 FINA World Championships will secure spots for their NOCs. In addition, at each of the CONSANAT Championships (Zone 1) and the PAQ Qualifying Diving Championships (Zone 2), divers from federations competing in such events may earn a quota position for their NOCs provided that the total number of divers from such Zones do not exceed 24 divers on all boards (including those who are ranked in FINA from such competing federations but excluding any divers from CHI). Zone 3 and 4 divers do not have separate qualifiers within their zones. National championships or trials events in Zones 3 and 4 may be used to name divers to already qualified positions.

== Results ==
| Rank | Diver | Nationality | Points |
|---|---|---|---|
| 1st place, gold medalist(s) | Kevin Berlín; Randal Willars | Mexico | 419.94 |
| 2nd place, silver medalist(s) | Rylan Wiens; Nathan Zsombor-Murray | Canada | 404.04 |
| 3rd place, bronze medalist(s) | Sebastián Villa; Alejandro Solarte | Colombia | 383.19 |
| 4 | Maxwell Flory; Jordan Rzepka | United States | 360.96 |
| 5 | Isaac Souza; Diogo Silva | Brazil | 356.91 |
| —N/a | José Ruvalcaba; Frandiel Gómez | Dominican Republic | Did not start |
