= Diving at the 2018 Central American and Caribbean Games – Men's 3 metre springboard =

Men's 3 metre springboard at the 2018 Central American and Caribbean Games
- Venue: Complejo Acuático
- Date: 21 July 2018
- Competitors: 12 from 8 nations
- Winning total: 473.30

Medalists
gold medal	Rommel Pacheco	Mexico
silver medal	Sebastián Morales	Colombia
bronze medal	Alejandro Arias	Colombia

The men's 3 metre springboard diving competition at the 2018 Central American and Caribbean Games in Barranquilla was held on 21 July at the Complejo Acuático.

== Format ==
The competition was held in two rounds:

- Preliminary round: All 12 divers perform six dives; the top 8 divers advance to the final.
- Final: The 8 divers perform six dives and the top three divers win the gold, silver and bronze medals accordingly.

== Schedule ==
All times are Colombia Time (UTC−5)

Date	Time	Round
Saturday, 21 July 2018	14:00; 16:00	Preliminary; Final

== Results ==
Green denotes finalists.

Rank	Diver	Preliminary		Final						
Rank	Diver	Points	Rank	Dive 1	Dive 2	Dive 3	Dive 4	Dive 5	Dive 6	Points
1st place, gold medalist(s)	Rommel Pacheco (MEX)	457.05	1	81.60	81.60	69.00	72.60	73.50	95.00	473.30
2nd place, silver medalist(s)	Sebastián Morales (COL)	401.25	3	76.50	78.20	66.50	85.80	61.20	83.60	451.80
3rd place, bronze medalist(s)	Alejandro Arias (COL)	372.15	4	71.40	76.50	55.10	68.25	73.80	67.65	412.70
4	Jahir Ocampo (MEX)	412.00	2	71.40	70.50	38.50	54.40	74.25	70.30	379.35
5	Rafael Quintero (PUR)	357.80	6	68.20	60.80	45.90	84.00	52.50	66.30	377.70
6	Yona Knight-Wisdom (JAM)	345.45	8	63.00	54.00	51.00	68.20	47.25	69.70	353.15
7	Oscar Ariza (VEN)	364.25	5	65.10	67.50	45.50	36.00	59.50	71.40	345.00
8	Carlos Escalona (CUB)	347.35	7	60.00	69.75	72.20	48.00	14.00	52.50	316.45
9	Emanuel Vazquez (PUR)	328.90	9	Did not advance						
10	Angello Alcebo (CUB)	323.70	10	Did not advance						
11	José Calderón (DOM)	319.95	11	Did not advance						
12	Anderson Cruz (GUA)	218.15	12	Did not advance						
