= Diving at the 2026 Central American and Caribbean Games =

- Venue: Centro Olímpico Juan Pablo Duarte
- Location: Santo Domingo, Dominican Republic
- Start date: 28 July 2026
- End date: 2 August 2026

The diving competition at the 2026 Central American and Caribbean Games was held in Santo Domingo, Dominican Republic, from 28 July to 2 August 2026 at the Centro Olímpico Juan Pablo Duarte.

== Participating nations ==
A total of 10 nations qualified athletes. The number of athletes a nation entered is in parentheses beside the name of the country.

- Colombia (6)
- Cuba (7)
- Dominican Republic (9)
- El Salvador (1)
- Guatemala (3)
- Haiti (1)
- Jamaica (1)
- Mexico (8)
- Panama (1)
- Venezuela (2)

== Medal table ==
* Host nation (Dominican Republic)

Rank	Nation	Gold	Silver	Bronze	Total
1	Mexico (MEX)	9	1	4	14
2	Colombia (COL)	0	6	1	7
3	Cuba (CUB)	0	1	2	3
4	Dominican Republic (DOM)*	0	1	1	2
5	Venezuela (VEN)	0	0	1	1
Totals (5 entries)		9	9	9	27

== Medal summary ==
=== Men's events ===
Event	Gold		Silver		Bronze	
1 m springboard	Osmar Olvera; Mexico	430.85	Luis Uribe; Colombia	415.00	Juan Celaya; Mexico	401.70
3 m springboard	Osmar Olvera; Mexico	535.30	Luis Uribe; Colombia	503.90	Juan Celaya; Mexico	458.05
10 m platform	Randal Willars; Mexico	570.70	Emilio Trevino; Mexico	484.60	Jesus Gonzalez; Venezuela	419.55
Synchronized 3 m springboard	Mexico; Juan Celaya; Osmar Olvera	419.34	Colombia; Luis Uribe; Sebastián Morales	414.99	Dominican Republic; Frandiel Gomez; Jose Calderon	345.57
Synchronized 10 m platform	Mexico; Randal Willars; Emilio Trevino	437.82	Cuba; Jesus Rodriguez; Bernaldo Arias	382.86	Colombia; Alejandro Solarte; Sebastián Villa	366.96

=== Women's events ===
Event	Gold		Silver		Bronze	
1 m springboard	Rut Páez; Mexico	265.20	Daniela Zapata; Colombia	253.35	Prisis Ruiz; Cuba	248.50
3 m springboard	Zyanya Parra; Mexico	322.45	Daniela Zapata; Colombia	318.15	Rut Paez; Mexico	307.45
10 m platform	Alejandra Estudillo; Mexico	359.40	Victoria Garza; Dominican Republic	332.60	Adriana Torres; Mexico	313.70
Synchronized 3 m springboard	Mexico; Rut Páez; Zyanya Parra	289.29	Colombia; Daniela Zapata; Viviana Uribe	272.70	Cuba; Anisley García; Prisis Ruiz	272.40
