= Diving at the 2018 Central American and Caribbean Games – Men's 1 metre springboard =

Diving competition

Men's 1 metre springboard at the 2018 Central American and Caribbean Games
- Venue: Complejo Acuático
- Date: 19–20 July 2018
- Competitors: 13 from 8 nations
- Winning total: 414.45 points

Medalists
gold medal	Jahir Ocampo	Mexico
silver medal	Sebastián Morales	Colombia
bronze medal	Rommel Pacheco	Mexico

The men's 1 metre springboard diving competition at the 2018 Central American and Caribbean Games in Barranquilla was held on 19 and 20 July at the Complejo Acuático.

== Format ==
The competition was held in two rounds:

- Preliminary round: All 13 divers perform six dives; the top 8 divers advance to the final.
- Final: The 8 divers perform six dives and the top three divers win the gold, silver and bronze medals accordingly.

== Schedule ==
All times are Colombia Time (UTC−5)

Date	Time	Round
Thursday, 19 July 2018	10:00	Preliminary
Friday, 20 July 2018	16:00	Final

== Results ==
Green denotes finalists.

Rank	Diver	Preliminary		Final						
Rank	Diver	Points	Rank	Dive 1	Dive 2	Dive 3	Dive 4	Dive 5	Dive 6	Points
1st place, gold medalist(s)	Jahir Ocampo (MEX)	382.60	2	67.50	75.00	69.75	72.00	63.00	67.20	414.45
2nd place, silver medalist(s)	Sebastián Morales (COL)	384.50	1	66.65	67.50	76.80	58.50	63.00	69.00	401.45
3rd place, bronze medalist(s)	Rommel Pacheco (MEX)	361.00	6	75.20	69.75	46.00	60.00	69.30	63.00	383.25
4	Rafael Quintero (PUR)	363.10	5	62.40	64.50	67.20	60.00	57.00	65.10	376.20
5	Frandiel Gomez (DOM)	343.60	7	55.90	43.50	63.00	49.50	57.80	65.60	335.30
6	Carlos Escalona (CUB)	369.70	4	58.50	72.00	60.45	63.00	42.00	38.40	334.35
7	Alejandro Arias (COL)	372.80	3	53.30	54.40	42.00	59.20	67.20	49.60	325.70
8	Angello Alcebo (CUB)	331.00	8	54.00	54.60	48.30	52.50	63.00	48.10	442.90
9	Yona Knight-Wisdom (JAM)	329.85	9	Did not advance						
10	Oscar Ariza (VEN)	303.90	10	Did not advance						
11	José Calderón (DOM)	293.60	11	Did not advance						
12	Eric Correa (PUR)	262.65	12	Did not advance						
13	Anderson Cruz (GUA)	222.15	13	Did not advance						
