= Diving at the 2023 Central American and Caribbean Games =

- Venue: Complejo Acuático El Polvorín
- Location: (El Salvador) San Salvador
- Dates: 1–6 July

The diving competition at the 2023 Central American and Caribbean Games will be held in San Salvador, El Salvador from 1 to 6 July at the Complejo Acuático El Polvorín.

== Medal table ==
* Host nation (El Salvador)

Rank	Nation	Gold	Silver	Bronze	Total
1	Mexico (MEX)	4	2	3	9
2	Colombia (COL)	4	2	1	7
3	Cuba (CUB)	2	3	2	7
4	Dominican Republic (DOM)	0	3	1	4
5	Puerto Rico (PUR)	0	0	2	2
6	Venezuela (VEN)	0	0	1	1
Totals (6 entries)		10	10	10	30

== Medal summary ==
=== Men's events ===
Event	Gold		Silver		Bronze	
1 m springboard	Sebastián Morales (COL)	379.80	Jonathan Ruvalcaba (DOM)	376.55	Yolotl Martínez (MEX)	352.10
3 m springboard	Diego García (MEX)	428.10	Jonathan Ruvalcaba (DOM)	421.60	Luis Uribe (COL)	416.80
10 m platform	Diego Balleza (MEX)	436.20	Sebastián Villa (COL)	413.30	Carlos Ramos (CUB)	412.70
3 m synchronized springboard	Mexico (MEX); Yolotl Martínez; Diego García	361.86	Colombia (COL); Luis Uribe; Daniel Restrepo	361.47	Dominican Republic (DOM); Jonathan Ruvalcaba; Frandiel Gómez	348.00
10 m synchronized platform	Colombia (COL); Leonardo García; Sebastián Villa	366.15	Dominican Republic (DOM); Jonathan Ruvalcaba; Frandiel Gómez	337.23	Mexico (MEX); Germán Sánchez; Diego Balleza	328.95

=== Women's events ===
Event	Gold		Silver		Bronze	
1 m springboard	Diana Pineda (COL)	259.40	Carolina Mendoza (MEX)	243.80	Anisley García (CUB)	241.65
3 m springboard	Prisis Randish (CUB)	294.60	Anisley Garcia (CUB)	279.70	Elizabeth Perez (VEN)	275.40
10 m platform	Anisley Garcia (CUB)	297.35	Viviana Del Angel (MEX)	275.40	Maycey Vieta (PUR)	272.00
3 m synchronized springboard	Colombia (COL); Viviana Uribe; Daniela Zapata	254.10	Cuba (CUB); Anisley García; Prisis Randish	244.50	Mexico (MEX); Carolina Mendoza; Abril Navarro	244.14

=== Mixed events ===
Event	Gold		Silver		Bronze	
10 m synchronized platform	Mexico (MEX); Viviana del Ángel; Diego Balleza	307.44	Cuba (CUB); Anisley García; Carlos Ramos	268.08	Puerto Rico (PUR); Maycey Vieta; Emanuel Vázquez	254.40
