= Diving at the 2014 South American Games =

- Venue: Aquatic Center National Stadium
- Dates: March 15–16

Diving at the 2014 South American Games was held in Santiago, Chile from March 15 to 16, 2014. Three competitions were held, two for men and one for women. All competition took place at the Aquatic Center National Stadium.

== Medalists ==
=== Men ===
Event	Gold	Silver	Bronze
3 m springboard	César Castro (BRA)	Sebastián Villa (COL)	Sebastián Morales (COL)
10 m platform	Hugo Parisi (BRA)	Juan Ríos Lopera (COL)	Víctor Ortega (COL)

=== Women ===
Event	Gold	Silver	Bronze
3 m springboard	María Florencia Betancourt (VEN)	Diana Pineda (COL)	Carolina Murillo (COL)

== Medal table ==
Rank	Nation	Gold	Silver	Bronze	Total
1	Brazil (BRA)	2	0	0	2
2	Venezuela (VEN)	1	0	0	1
3	Colombia (COL)	0	3	3	6
Totals (3 entries)		3	3	3	9

== Participating nations ==
A total of 28 athletes from 5 nations competed in diving at the 2014 South American Games:

- Brazil (6)
- Chile (5)
- Colombia (6)
- Ecuador (6)
- Venezuela (5)
