= Malaysia at the 2023 World Aquatics Championships =

- Flag of Malaysia
- FINA code: MAS
- National federation: Malaysia Swimming Federation
- Website: malaysiaswimming.org

in Fukuoka, Japan
- Competitors: 17 in 2 sports
- Medals: Gold 0 Silver 0 Bronze 0 Total 0

World Aquatics Championships appearances
- 1973; 1975; 1978; 1982; 1986; 1991; 1994; 1998; 2001; 2003; 2005; 2007; 2009; 2011; 2013; 2015; 2017; 2019; 2022; 2023; 2024

Malaysia competed at the 2023 World Aquatics Championships in Fukuoka, Japan from 14 to 30 July.

== Diving ==
Malaysia entered 13 divers.

Men

| Athlete | Event | Preliminaries | | Semifinals | | Final | |
| Athlete | Event | Points | Rank | Points | Rank | Points | Rank |
|---|---|---|---|---|---|---|---|
| Gabriel Gilbert Daim | 1 m springboard | 242.95 | 53 | — | | Did not advance | |
| Gabriel Gilbert Daim | 3 m springboard | DNS | | | | | |
| Hanis Nazirul Jaya Surya | 1 m springboard | 250.10 | 51 | — | | Did not advance | |
| Ooi Tze Liang | 3 m springboard | 383.60 | 18 Q | 402.40 | 14 | Did not advance | |
| Bertrand Rhodict Lises | 10 m platform | 449.65 | 3 Q | 420.70 | 10 Q | 442.35 | 10 |
| Enrique Harold | 10 m platform | 308.20 | 39 | Did not advance | | | |
| Ooi Tze Liang; Muhammad Syafiq Puteh | 3 m synchro springboard | 326.73 | 19 | — | | Did not advance | |
| Bertrand Rhodict Lises; Enrique Harold | 10 m synchro platform | 376.80 | 7 Q | — | | 310.44 | 12 |

Women

| Athlete | Event | Preliminaries | | Semifinals | | Final | |
| Athlete | Event | Points | Rank | Points | Rank | Points | Rank |
|---|---|---|---|---|---|---|---|
| Kimberly Bong | 1 m springboard | 178.40 | 44 | — | | Did not advance | |
| Ong Ker Ying | 1 m springboard | 204.30 | 35 | — | | Did not advance | |
| Wendy Ng | 3 m springboard | 229.25 | 36 | Did not advance | | | |
| Nur Dhabitah Sabri | 3 m springboard | 303.55 | 5 Q | 285.45 | 15 | Did not advance | |
| Nur Eilisha Rania Abrar Raj | 10 m platform | 206.45 | 35 | Did not advance | | | |
| Pandelela Rinong | 10 m platform | 256.40 | 24 | Did not advance | | | |
| Wendy Ng; Nur Dhabitah Sabri | 3 m synchro springboard | 278.43 | 5 Q | — | | 272.94 | 8 |

Mixed

| Athlete | Event | Final | |
| Athlete | Event | Points | Rank |
|---|---|---|---|
| Jellson Jabillin; Nur Eilisha Rania Muhammad Abrar Raj | 10 m synchro platform | 251.64 | 12 |
| Nur Binti Muhammad Abrar Raj; Kimberly Bong; Jeilson Jabillin; Hanis Jaya Surya | Team event | 320.00 | 10 |

== Swimming ==
Malaysia entered 5 swimmers. But Phee Jinq En out from this tournament due to health complications.

Men

| Athlete | Event | Heat | | Semifinal | | Final | |
| Athlete | Event | Time | Rank | Time | Rank | Time | Rank |
|---|---|---|---|---|---|---|---|
| Khiew Hoe Yean | 200 m freestyle | 1:48.18 | 30 | Did not advance | | | |
| Khiew Hoe Yean | 400 m freestyle | 3:50.78 | 24 | — | | Did not advance | |
| Khiew Hoe Yean | 800 m freestyle | 8:05.11 NR | 29 | — | | Did not advance | |
| Khiew Hoe Yean | 200 m backstroke | 2:03.14 | 29 | Did not advance | | | |
| Andrew Goh | 50 m breaststroke | 28.75 | 37 | Did not advance | | | |
| Andrew Goh | 100 m breaststroke | Disqualified | | Did not advance | | | |
| Bryan Leong | 50 m butterfly | 24.54 | 53 | Did not advance | | | |
| Bryan Leong | 100 m butterfly | 52.96 NR | 35 | Did not advance | | | |
| Tan Khai Xin | 200 m individual medley | 2:06.31 | 37 | Did not advance | | | |
| Tan Khai Xin | 400 m individual medley | 4:26.83 | 24 | — | | Did not advance | |
