= Diving at the 2021 Junior Pan American Games =

Diving at the Pan American Games
- Diving pictograms
- Venue: Hernando Botero O'byrne Swimming Pools
- Dates: 25–28 November
- Competitors: 53 from 11 nations

Diving competitions at the 2021 Junior Pan American Games in Cali, Colombia, were held at the Hernando Botero O'byrne Swimming Pools.

7 medal events were contested.

== Medal table ==
* Host nation (Colombia)

Rank	Nation	Gold	Silver	Bronze	Total
1	Mexico	4	3	1	8
2	Cuba	2	2	1	5
3	United States	1	1	3	5
4	Colombia*	0	1	1	2
5	Brazil	0	0	1	1
Totals (5 entries)		7	7	7	21

== Medallists ==
=== Men ===
Event	Gold		Silver		Bronze	
Men's 1 m Springboard	Osmar Olvera; Mexico	412.85	Kevin Muñoz; Mexico	394.55	Carson Tyler; United States	379.35
Men's 3 m Springboard	Quentin Henninger; United States	414.65	Laydel Dominguéz Cervantes; Cuba	408.35	Randal Willars; Mexico	404.40
Men's 10 m Platform	Randal Willars; Mexico	448.90	Luis Cañabate Alvarez; Cuba	416.25	Kawan Figueredo Pereira; Brazil	393.85

=== Women ===
Event	Gold		Silver		Bronze	
Women's 1 m Springboard	Anisley García; Cuba	276.50	Joslyn Oakley; United States	252.30	Steffanie Madrigal; Colombia	247.65
Women's 3 m Springboard	Frida Zúñiga Guzman; Mexico	292.70	Steffanie Madrigal; Colombia	286.25	Joslyn Oakley; United States	261.00
Women's 10 m Platform	Alejandra Estudillo Torres; Mexico	301.50	Frida Zúñiga Guzman; Mexico	286.90	Anisley García; Cuba	285.85

=== Mixed ===
Event	Gold		Silver		Bronze	
Team Event	Cuba; Anisley García; Laydel Domínguez; Carlos Ramos; Luis Cañabate	471.20	Mexico; Alejandra Estudillo; María Sánchez; Osmar Olvera; Randal Willars	468.35	United States; Carson Tyler; Emilie Moore; Kaylee Bishop; Quentin Henninger	417.10
