= Osmar Olvera =

Mexican diver (born 2004)

Personal information
- Full name: Osmar Olvera Ibarra
- Born: 5 June 2004 (age 22) Mexico City, Mexico

Sport
- Country: Mexico
- Sport: Diving
- Event: 3 m springboard
Medal record
Men's diving
Representing Mexico
Olympic Games
Silver medal – second place	2024 Paris	3 m synchro
Bronze medal – third place	2024 Paris	3 m springboard
World Championships
Gold medal – first place	2024 Doha	1 m springboard
Gold medal – first place	2025 Singapore	3 m springboard
Silver medal – second place	2023 Fukuoka	1 m springboard
Silver medal – second place	2023 Fukuoka	3 m springboard
Silver medal – second place	2025 Singapore	1 m springboard
Silver medal – second place	2025 Singapore	Team
Silver medal – second place	2025 Singapore	3 m synchro
Bronze medal – third place	2024 Doha	3 m springboard
Pan American Games
Gold medal – first place	2023 Santiago	1 m springboard
Gold medal – first place	2023 Santiago	3 m springboard
Gold medal – first place	2023 Santiago	3 m synchro
Central American and Caribbean Games
Gold medal – first place	2026 Santo Domingo	1 m springboard
Gold medal – first place	2026 Santo Domingo	3 m springboard
Gold medal – first place	2026 Santo Domingo	3 m synchro
Junior Pan American Games
Gold medal – first place	2021 Cali-Valle	1 m Springboard
Silver medal – second place	2021 Cali-Valle	Mixed Team

Osmar Olvera Ibarra (born 5 June 2004) is a Mexican diver. He was the youngest diver in the Mexican diving team in the 2020 Summer Olympics. He earned two medals at the 2024 Summer Olympics: silver at the synchronized 3 meters springboard event (along with Juan Celaya) and bronze at the individual 3 meters springboard. He became the first Mexican athlete since the 1984 Summer Olympics to win medals in two different events at the same Games, with Raúl González being the last to achieve this feat.

He won six gold medals at the 2019 Olimpiada Nacional (National Olympics).
