= Diving at the 2026 South American Games =

Diving competitions at the 2026 South American Games

- Venue: Invencible Centro Acuático Provincial
- Dates: September 13–16
- Competitors: 20 from 8 nations

Diving competitions at the 2026 South American Games in Rosario, Santa Fe, and Rafaela, Argentina, were held between September 13 and 16 at Invencible Centro Acuático Provincial, located within Museo del Deporte Santafesino in Santa Fe.

A total of 10 events were announced to be contested (five men's and five women's). Ultimately, only six events took place, without the men's synchronized competitions. The games gave a qualifying quota to the gold medalists for the 2027 Pan American Games diving competitions.

== Medal summary ==
=== Medal table ===
* Host nation (Argentina)

Rank	Nation	Gold	Silver	Bronze	Total
1	Colombia	4	4	0	8
2	Brazil	1	1	4	6
3	Ecuador	1	0	0	1
4	Venezuela	0	1	0	1
5	Peru	0	0	2	2
Totals (5 entries)		6	6	6	18

=== Medalists ===
==== Men ====
Event	Gold		Silver		Bronze	
1 m springboard	Sebastián Morales; Colombia	407.10	Luis Uribe; Colombia	370.90	Luis Bonfim; Brazil	367.75
3 m springboard	Luis Uribe; Colombia	445.90	Sebastián Morales; Colombia	418.00	Luis Bonfim; Brazil	380.35
10 m platform	Santiago Chóez; Ecuador	389.95	Jesus González; Venezuela	372.70	Miguel Pereira; Brazil	326.05

==== Women ====
Event	Gold		Silver		Bronze	
1 m springboard	Daniela Zapata; Colombia	253.00	Anna Lúcia dos Santos; Brazil	241.40	Luana Lira; Brazil	238.20
3 m springboard	Daniela Zapata; Colombia	300.35	Viviana Uribe; Colombia	277.65	Ana Ricci; Peru	257.45
Synchronised 3 m springboard	Anna Lúcia dos Santos; Luana Lira; Brazil	258.60	Daniela Zapata; Viviana Uribe; Colombia	252.90	Ana Ricci; Mayte Salinas; Peru	232.05

== Participation ==
Eight nations participated in the diving events of the 2026 South American Games.

- Argentina (2)
- Brazil (6)
- Chile (1)
- Colombia (4)
- Ecuador (1)
- Paraguay (1)
- Peru (3)
- Venezuela (2)

== Results ==
=== Men's 1 m springboard ===
Rank	Name	Nation	Points
1st place, gold medalist(s)	Sebastián Morales	Colombia	407.10
2nd place, silver medalist(s)	Luis Uribe	Colombia	370.90
3rd place, bronze medalist(s)	Luis Bonfim	Brazil	367.75
4	Pablo Argüelles	Peru	348.85
5	Rafael Silva	Brazil	334.55
6	Jesús González	Venezuela	325.15
7	Juan Travieso	Venezuela	320.20
8	Santiago Choez	Ecuador	289.15

=== Women's 1 m springboard ===
Rank	Name	Nation	Points
1st place, gold medalist(s)	Daniela Zapata	Colombia	253.00
2nd place, silver medalist(s)	Anna Lúcia dos Santos	Brazil	241.40
3rd place, bronze medalist(s)	Luana Lira	Brazil	238.20
4	Ana Ricci	Peru	222.40
5	Viviana Uribe	Colombia	202.30
6	Mayte Salinas	Peru	187.75
7	Azul Chiorazzo	Argentina	179.60
8	Martina Flores	Chile	135.65
9	Kiara Mallada	Paraguay	101.10

=== Men's 3 m springboard ===
Rank	Name	Nation	Points
1st place, gold medalist(s)	Luis Uribe	Colombia	445.90
2nd place, silver medalist(s)	Sebastián Morales	Colombia	418.00
3rd place, bronze medalist(s)	Luis Bonfim	Brazil	380.35
4	Pablo Argüelles	Peru	349.70
5	Jesús González	Venezuela	340.75
6	Juan Travieso	Venezuela	324.70
7	Rafael Silva	Brazil	296.55
8	Santiago Choez	Ecuador	293.60

=== Women's 3 m springboard ===
Rank	Name	Nation	Points
1st place, gold medalist(s)	Daniela Zapata	Colombia	300.35
2nd place, silver medalist(s)	Viviana Uribe	Colombia	277.65
3rd place, bronze medalist(s)	Ana Ricci	Peru	257.45
4	Luana Lira	Brazil	247.05
5	Anna Lúcia dos Santos	Brazil	243.30
6	Azul Chiorazzo	Argentina	219.35
7	Mayte Salinas	Peru	187.85
8	Auka Sosa	Argentina	164.40
9	Martina Flores	Chile	144.40

=== Men's 10 m platform ===
Rank	Name	Nation	Points
1st place, gold medalist(s)	Santiago Chóez	Ecuador	389.95
2nd place, silver medalist(s)	Jesús González	Venezuela	372.70
3rd place, bronze medalist(s)	Miguel Pereira	Brazil	326.05
4	Pablo Argüelles	Peru	303.50
5	Caio Santos	Brazil	281.35

=== Women's synchronized 3 m springboard ===
Rank	Name	Nation	Points
1st place, gold medalist(s)	Luana Lira / Anna Lúcia dos Santos	Brazil	258.60
2nd place, silver medalist(s)	Viviana Uribe / Daniela Zapata	Colombia	252.90
3rd place, bronze medalist(s)	Mayte Salinas / Ana Ricci	Peru	232.05
4	Auka Sosa / Azul Chiorazzo	Argentina	204.96
