= Kevin Berlín =

Mexican diver (born 2001)

Personal information
- Full name: Kevin Berlín Reyes
- Born: 25 April 2001 (age 25) Veracruz, Mexico

Sport
- Country: Mexico
- Sport: Diving
Medal record
Men's diving
Representing Mexico
World Championships
Bronze medal – third place	2023 Fukuoka	10 m synchro
Bronze medal – third place	2024 Doha	10 m mixed synchro
Pan American Games
Gold medal – first place	2019 Lima	10 m platform
Gold medal – first place	2019 Lima	10 m synchro
Gold medal – first place	2023 Santiago	10 m synchro

Kevin Berlín Reyes (Note: In this Spanish name, the first or paternal surname is Berlín and the second or maternal family name is Reyes.) (born 25 April 2001) is a Mexican diver.

== Career ==
He represented Mexico at the 2019 Pan American Games and he won the gold medal in the men's 10 metre platform event. Berlín and Iván García also won the gold medal in the men's synchronized 10 metre platform event.

In 2017, he finished in 10th place in the men's synchronized 10 metre platform event at the World Aquatics Championships held in Budapest, Hungary. In 2019, he finished in 7th place in this event at the World Aquatics Championships held in Gwangju, South Korea.

In 2021, he competed in the men's synchronized 10 metre platform event at the 2020 Summer Olympics held in Tokyo, Japan and placed 4th. At the 2024 Olympics, he competed with partner Randal Willars in the same event and again placed 4th.
