= Diving at the 2022 South American Games =

Diving competitions at the 2022 South American Games

- Venue: Centro Acuático Nacional
- Dates: October 2−5
- Nations: 6

Diving competitions at the 2022 South American Games in Asunción, Paraguay were held between October 2 and 5, 2022 at the Centro Acuático Nacional

== Schedule ==
The competition schedule is as follows:

P	Preliminary round	F	Final

Date Event	Sun 2	Mon 3	Tue 4	Wed 5
Men's 1 m springboard				F
Men's 3 m springboard		F		
Men's 10 m platform			F	
Men's synchronised 3 m springboard	F			
Men's synchronised 10 m platform		F		
Women's 1 m springboard	F			
Women's 3 m springboard			F	
Women's 10 m platform		F		
Women's synchronised 3 m springboard				F
Women's synchronised 10 m platform			F	

== Medal summary ==
=== Medal table ===
* Host nation (Paraguay)

Rank	Nation	Gold	Silver	Bronze	Total
1	Colombia	7	3	3	13
2	Brazil	1	3	3	7
3	Peru	0	2	1	3
4	Venezuela	0	0	1	1
Totals (4 entries)		8	8	8	24

=== Medalists ===
==== Men ====
Event	Gold		Silver		Bronze	
1 m springboard	Luis Uribe; Colombia	391.05	Sebastián Morales; Colombia	386.05	Rafael Araújo; Brazil	334.60
3 m springboard	Luis Uribe; Colombia	459.05	Sebastián Morales; Colombia	404.05	Jesús Liranzo; Peru	382.75
10 m platform	Sebastián Villa; Colombia	430.60	Jesús Liranzo; Peru	409.75	Alejandro Osorio; Colombia	383.20
Synchronised 3 m springboard	Luis Uribe; Sebastián Morales; Colombia	393.06	Rafael Araújo; Rafael Almeida; Brazil	343.92	Jesús González; Óscar Ariza; Venezuela	322.08
Synchronised 10 m platform	Jesús González; Óscar Ariza; Venezuela	359.76	Davi Lyrio; Diogo Silva; Brazil	286.20	Only two teams	

==== Women ====
Event	Gold		Silver		Bronze	
1 m springboard	Anna Lúcia dos Santos; Brazil	245.10	Luana Lira; Brazil	234.15	Diana Pineda; Colombia	230.25
3 m springboard	Viviana Uribe; Colombia	274.10	Daniela Zapata; Colombia	272.50	Luana Lira; Brazil	245.60
10 m platform	Viviana Uribe; Colombia	249.70	Andressa Mendes; Brazil	241.35	Mariana Osorio; Colombia	235.15
Synchronised 3 m springboard	Daniela Zapata; Viviana Uribe; Colombia	250.38	Ana Ricci; Mayte Salinas; Peru	219.84	Anna Lúcia dos Santos; Luana Lira; Brazil	217.80
Synchronised 10 m platform	Dhavgel Mendoza; Lisette Ramírez; Venezuela	226.26	Only one team			

== Participation ==
Six nations participated in diving events of the 2022 South American Games.

- Argentina
- Brazil
- Chile
- Colombia
- Peru
- Venezuela

== Results ==
=== Men's 1 m springboard ===
Rank	Name	Nation	Points
1st place, gold medalist(s)	Luis Uribe	Colombia	391.05
2nd place, silver medalist(s)	Sebastián Morales	Colombia	386.05
3rd place, bronze medalist(s)	Rafael Araujo	Brazil	334.60
4	Donato Neglia	Chile	330.70
5	Diego Carquín	Chile	320.60
6	Diogo Silva	Brazil	310.50
7	Manuel Iglesias	Argentina	294.00
8	Facundo Meza	Peru	280.70
9	Daniel Pinto	Peru	104.10
10	Jesús González	Venezuela	43.50

=== Women's 1 m springboard ===
Rank	Name	Nation	Points
1st place, gold medalist(s)	Anna Lúcia dos Santos	Brazil	245.10
2nd place, silver medalist(s)	Luana Lira	Brazil	234.15
3rd place, bronze medalist(s)	Diana Pineda	Colombia	230.25
4	Viviana Uribe	Colombia	213.50
5	Elizabeth Pérez	Venezuela	209.70
6	Dhavgel Mendoza	Venezuela	198.65
7	Ana Ricci	Peru	189.10
8	Mayte Salinas	Peru	184.15
9	Auka Sosa	Argentina	149.75

=== Men's 3 m springboard ===
Rank	Name	Nation	Points
1st place, gold medalist(s)	Luis Uribe	Colombia	459.05
2nd place, silver medalist(s)	Sebastián Morales	Colombia	404.05
3rd place, bronze medalist(s)	Jesús Liranzo	Peru	382.75
4	Rafael Araujo	Brazil	337.75
5	Jesús González	Venezuela	324.30
6	Diego Carquín	Chile	323.25
7	Rafael Almeida	Brazil	322.65
8	Donato Neglia	Chile	319.00
9	Daniel Pinto	Peru	316.30
10	Manuel Iglesias	Argentina	289.75

=== Women's 3 m springboard ===
Rank	Name	Nation	Points
1st place, gold medalist(s)	Viviana Uribe	Colombia	274.10
2nd place, silver medalist(s)	Daniela Zapata	Colombia	272.50
3rd place, bronze medalist(s)	Luana Lira	Brazil	245.60
4	Ana Ricci	Peru	243.80
5	Anna Lúcia dos Santos	Brazil	231.90
6	Elizabeth Pérez	Venezuela	230.65
7	Mayte Salinas	Peru	214.45
8	Auka Sosa	Argentina	167.85
9	Dhavgel Mendoza	Venezuela	159.45
	Valentina Rojas	Venezuela	DNS

=== Men's 10 m springboard ===
Rank	Name	Nation	Points
1st place, gold medalist(s)	Sebastián Villa	Colombia	430.60
2nd place, silver medalist(s)	Jesús Liranzo	Peru	409.75
2nd place, silver medalist(s)	Alejandro Solarte	Colombia	383.20
4	Diogo Silva	Brazil	278.90
5	Jesús González	Venezuela	337.45
6	Óscar Ariza	Venezuela	334.95
7	Davi Lyrio	Brazil	279.95
8	Manuel Iglesias	Argentina	230.80

=== Women's 10 m springboard ===
Rank	Name	Nation	Points
1st place, gold medalist(s)	Viviana Uribe	Colombia	249.70
2nd place, silver medalist(s)	Andressa Mendes	Brazil	241.35
3rd place, bronze medalist(s)	Mariana Osorio	Colombia	235.15
4	Valentina Rojas	Venezuela	209.95
5	Pamela Reyes	Peru	198.90
6	Dhavgel Mendoza	Venezuela	188.80
7	Auka Sosa	Argentina	165.60
	Lisette Ramírez	Venezuela	DNS

=== Men's synchronized 3 m springboard ===
Rank	Name	Nation	Points
1st place, gold medalist(s)	Luis Uribe / Sebastián Morales	Colombia	393.06
2nd place, silver medalist(s)	Rafael Araujo / Rafael Almeida	Brazil	343.92
3rd place, bronze medalist(s)	Jesús González / Óscar Ariza	Venezuela	322.08
4	Daniel Pinto / Jesús Liranzo	Peru	311.85
5	Diego Carquín / Donato Neglia	Chile	304.41

=== Women's synchronized 3 m springboard ===
Rank	Name	Nation	Points
1st place, gold medalist(s)	Daniela Zapata / Viviana Uribe	Colombia	250.38
2nd place, silver medalist(s)	Ana Ricci / Mayte Salinas	Peru	219.84
3rd place, bronze medalist(s)	Anna Lúcia dos Santos / Luana Lira	Brazil	217.80
4	Dhavgel Mendoza / Valentina Rojas	Venezuela	204.78

=== Men's synchronized 10 m springboard ===
Rank	Name	Nation	Points
1	Jesús González / Óscar Ariza	Venezuela	359.76
2	Davi Lyrio / Diogo Silva	Brazil	286.20
3	Only two teams		

=== Women's synchronized 10 m springboard ===
Rank	Name	Nation	Points
1	Dhavgel Mendoza / Valentina Rojas	Venezuela	226.26
2	Only team		
3	Only team		
