= Luis Uribe (diver) =

Colombian diver (born 2001)

Personal information
- Full name: Luis Felipe Uribe Bermudez
- Born: 3 September 2001 (age 25) Risaralda, Colombia

Sport
- Country: Colombia
- Sport: Diving
- Events: 1 m springboard; 3 m springboard; 3 m synchro
Medal record
Representing Colombia
Men's diving
Event	1st	2nd	3rd
World Junior Championships	0	0	1
World Cup	0	0	2
Grand Prix	1	0	0
Pan American Games	0	2	1
CAC Games	0	4	1
South American Games	4	2	0
Total	5	8	5
Pan American Games
Silver medal – second place	2023 Santiago	3 m springboard
Silver medal – second place	2023 Santiago	3 m synchro
Bronze medal – third place	2023 Santiago	1 m springboard
Central American and Caribbean Games
Silver medal – second place	2023 San Salvador	3 m synchro
Silver medal – second place	2026 Santo Domingo	1 m springboard
Silver medal – second place	2026 Santo Domingo	3 m springboard
Silver medal – second place	2026 Santo Domingo	3 m synchro
Bronze medal – third place	2023 San Salvador	3 m springboard
South American Games
Gold medal – first place	2022 Asunción	1 m springboard
Gold medal – first place	2022 Asunción	3 m springboard
Gold medal – first place	2022 Asunción	3 m synchro
Gold medal – first place	2026 Santa Fe	3 m springboard
Silver medal – second place	2018 Cochabamba	3 m springboard
Silver medal – second place	2026 Santa Fe	1 m springboard
World Junior Championships
Bronze medal – third place	2018 Kyiv	3 m synchro

Luis Felipe Uribe Bermudez (born 3 September 2001) is a Colombian diver. At the 2022 South American Games, he won gold medals in the 1 metre springboard, 3 metre springboard, and 3 metre synchronised springboard. At the 2022 World Aquatics Championships, he placed fourth in the 3 metre springboard and seventh in the 3 metre synchronised springboard. He won a bronze medal at the 2018 World Junior Championships in the 3 metre synchronised springboard.

== Background ==
Uribe was born 3 September 2001 and is based in the Risaralda Department of Colombia. He has a sister, Viviana Uribe, who is also a competitive diver.

== Career ==
=== 2018 World Junior Championships ===
At the 2018 World Junior Diving Championships, held in Kyiv, Ukraine in July, Uribe won a bronze medal in the 3 metre synchronised springboard event with his partner Daniel Restrepo, finishing with a score of 290.88 points, which was less than 10 points behind the gold medalist duo of Henry McKay and Victor Povzner from Canada. He also placed sixth in the 1 metre springboard with a score of 489.85 points, twelfth in the mixed team event at 233.70 points, and 20th in the 3 metre springboard with a score of 460.15 points.

=== 2022 World Aquatics Championships ===
In the preliminaries of the 3 metre synchronised springboard at the 2022 World Aquatics Championships, held in Budapest, Hungary in June and July, Uribe and his partner Sebastián Morales, ranked fourth with a score of 387.27 points and qualified for the final. For the final, held later the same day, they placed seventh, scoring a total of 364.62 points for their six dives. The following day, in the preliminaries of the 3 metre springboard, he scored 402.55 points to qualify for the semifinals ranking fourth. In the semifinals, he improved his score and ranked as the highest-placed Latin American competitor in the round of competition with a score of 411.70 points and overall fourth-rank. He placed fourth in the final the following day, finishing within 17 points of bronze medalist, Jack Laugher of Great Britain, with a score of 457.15 points. From the six dives he executed in the final round of competition, Uribe's highest individual dive ranked third and lowest individual dive ranked seventh, only one diver had a higher ranking lowest individual dive, gold medalist Wang Zongyuan of China whose lowest dive ranked third.

=== 2022 South American Games ===
2022 South American Games
Gold medal – first place	3 m synchro springboard	393.06
Gold medal – first place	3 m springboard	459.05
Gold medal – first place	1 m springboard	391.05

For the 2022 South American Games, held in October in Asunción, Paraguay, Uribe entered to compete in three events as part of diving competition, the 1 metre springboard, 3 metre springboard, and 3 metre synchronised springboard. In his first event, the 3 metre synchronised springboard on 2 October, he and his partner Sebastián Morales won the gold medal with a score of 393.06 points, finishing over 49 points ahead of the silver medalists from Brazil. The following day, he won the gold medal in the 3 metre springboard, scoring 55 points ahead of silver medalist and fellow Colombian Sebastián Morales with a final mark of 459.05 points. The fourth and final day, he won a gold medal in the 1 metre springboard with a final mark of 391.05 points. His wins helped Colombia rank second in the medal table, only behind Brazil, at the end of 5 October, the fifth day of competition across all sports at the Games.

== International championships ==
Meet	1 m springboard	3 m springboard	3 m synchronised springboard	mixed team
Junior level
WJC 2018	6th (489.85)	20th (460.15)	(bronze) (290.88)	12th (233.70)
Senior level
SAG 2018	—N/a	(silver) (393.00)		—N/a
WC 2022		4th (457.15)	7th (364.62)	
SAG 2022	(gold) (391.05)	(gold) (459.05)	(gold) (393.06)	—N/a
CAC 2023	9th (298.05)	(bronze) (416.80)	(silver) (361.47)	—N/a
WC 2023	20th (327.10)	29th (360.85)	17th (334.32)	
PAG 2023	(bronze) (371.20)	(silver) (444.25)	(silver) (398.67)	—N/a
WC 2024		4th (443.15)	17th (320.13)	
OG 2024	—N/a	6th (421.85)		—N/a
WC 2025		8th (443.25)		
CAC 2026	(silver) (415.00)	(silver) (503.90)	(silver) (414.99)	—N/a
SAG 2026	(silver) (370.90)	(gold) (445.90)	—N/a	—N/a
