= Diving at the 2014 South American Games – Men's 3 metre springboard =

Men's 3 metre springboard at the 2014 South American Games
- Venue: Aquatic Center National Stadium
- Dates: March 15 (final)
- Competitors: 10 from 5 nations
- Winning score: 448.85

Medalists
gold medal	César Castro (BRA)
silver medal	Sebastián Villa (COL)
bronze medal	Sebastián Morales (COL)

The men's 3 metre springboard diving competition at the 2014 South American Games in Santiago was held on 15 March at the Aquatic Center National Stadium.

== Schedule ==
All times are Chile Summer Time (UTC−03:00)

Date	Time	Event
15 March	11:30	Final

== Results ==
Rank	Athlete	Dive						Total
Rank	Athlete	1	2	3	4	5	6	Total
1st place, gold medalist(s)	César Castro (BRA)	76.50	79.05	83.30	58.50	75.00	76.50	448.85
2nd place, silver medalist(s)	Sebastián Villa (COL)	75.00	71.30	76.50	79.20	63.00	81.60	446.60
3rd place, bronze medalist(s)	Sebastián Morales (COL)	72.00	75.95	78.20	78.20	76.50	54.45	435.30
4	Emilio Colmenares (VEN)	79.05	61.50	67.50	69.30	81.60	67.50	426.45
5	Diego Carquin (CHI)	70.50	68.00	74.40	73.10	67.50	64.50	418.00
6	Ian Matos (BRA)	70.50	69.00	69.00	54.45	79.90	69.75	412.60
7	Alfredo Colmenares (VEN)	69.00	57.35	72.00	72.00	74.80	49.30	394.45
8	Donato Neglia (CHI)	69.00	43.40	68.00	57.00	61.50	47.60	346.50
9	Walter Vera (ECU)	36.40	61.50	36.00	54.00	57.40	39.15	284.45
10	Jonathan Posligua (ECU)	54.00	46.20	48.00	54.60	37.80	21.00	261.60
