= Sebastián Villa (diver) =

Colombian diver (born 1992)

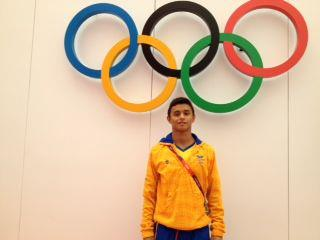
- Villa in London 2012

Personal information
- Born: 21 February 1992 (age 34) Medellín, Colombia

Sport
- Country: Colombia
- Sport: Diving
- Events: 10 m platform 10 m synchro
Medal record
Representing Colombia
Men's diving
Pan American Games
Bronze medal – third place	2011 Guadalajara	10 m platform
Bronze medal – third place	2023 Santiago	10 m synchro
Central American and Caribbean Games
Gold medal – first place	2023 San Salvador	10 m synchro
Silver medal – second place	2023 San Salvador	10 m platform
Bronze medal – third place	2026 Santo Domingo	10 m synchro
South American Games
Gold medal – first place	2022 Asunción	10 m platform
Silver medal – second place	2014 Santiago	3 m springboard

Sebastián Villa Castañeda (born 21 February 1992) is a Colombian diver. He competed for Colombia at the 2012, 2016 and 2020 Summer Olympics.

He won a bronze medal in the men's synchronised 10 m synchronised platform diving with Alejandro Solarte at the 2023 Pan American Games.

He also competed at the 2019 World Championships (in the 3 m mixed synchronised and the 3 and 10 m mixed events, both with Diana Pineda).
