= Diving at the 2023 Pan American Games =

- Diving pictogram
- Venue: Aquatics Centre
- Start date: October 20, 2023
- End date: October 25, 2023
- No. of events: 10 (5 men, 5 women)
- Competitors: 73 from 13 nations

Diving competitions at the 2023 Pan American Games in Santiago, Chile are scheduled to take place from October 26 to 30, 2023 at the Aquatics Centre. It will be one of four aquatic sports at the Games, along with swimming and artistic swimming.

The games will feature competitions in ten events (men and women events each of): 1m springboard, 3m springboard, synchronised 3m springboard, 10m platform, and synchronised 10m platform.

The winner of each individual 3m and 10m event (if not already qualified) will qualify for the 2024 Summer Olympics in Paris, France.

== Qualification ==
A total of up to 80 divers (40 per gender) will qualify to compete. A nation may enter a maximum of 10 divers (if entering teams in synchronized diving) or 6 athletes (if not entering teams in synchronized diving), with the exception of the winners of the 2021 Junior Pan American Games, provided that these athletes participate only in the event in which they qualified in Cali. The host nation (Chile) automatically qualified a full team of 10 athletes (five per gender). The top 18 men and women in individual events in the 2022 and 2023 FINA World Championships will secure spots for their NOCs. In addition, at each of the CONSANAT Championships (Zone 1) and the PAQ Qualifying Diving Championships (Zone 2), divers from federations competing in such events may earn a quota position for their NOCs provided that the total number of divers from such Zones do not exceed 24 divers on all boards (including those who are ranked in FINA from such competing federations but excluding any divers from CHI). Zone 3 and 4 divers do not have separate qualifiers within their zones. National championships or trials events in Zones 3 and 4 may be used to name divers to already qualified positions.

== Participating nations ==
A total of 13 countries qualified divers.

- Brazil (9)
- Canada (10)
- Chile (2)
- Colombia (8)
- Cuba (7)
- Dominican Republic (3)
- Ecuador (1)
- Jamaica (2)
- Mexico (12)
- Peru (3)
- Puerto Rico (3)
- United States (10)
- Venezuela (2)

== Medal summary ==
=== Medal table ===
* Host nation (Chile)

Rank	NOC's	Gold	Silver	Bronze	Total
1	Mexico	8	2	1	11
2	Canada	2	5	1	8
3	Colombia	0	2	2	4
4	Dominican Republic	0	1	0	1
5	United States	0	0	5	5
6	Brazil	0	0	1	1
Totals (6 entries)		10	10	10	30

=== Medalists ===
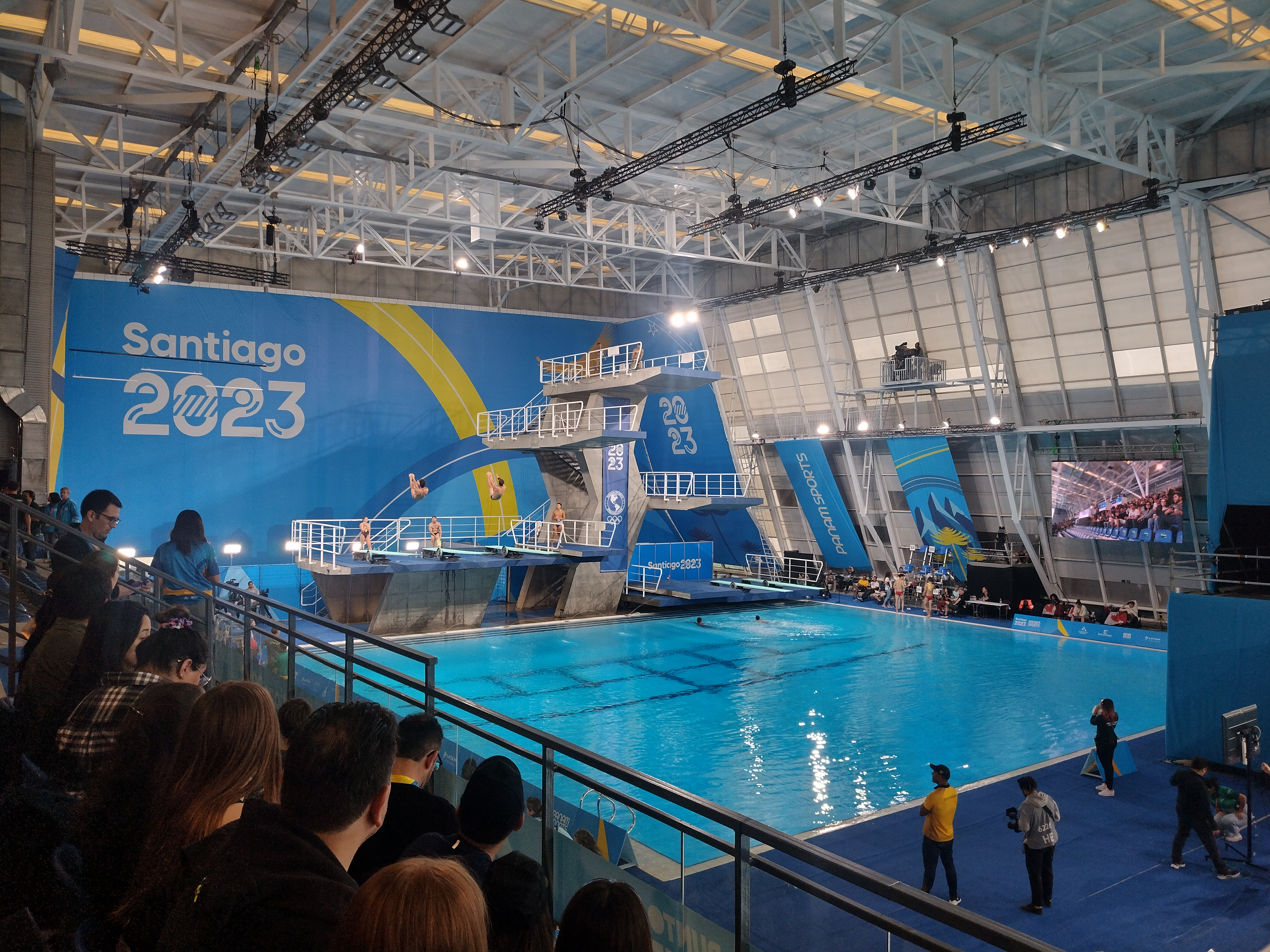
The diving venue during the competition

==== Men's events ====
Games	Gold	Silver	Bronze
1 m springboard	Osmar Olvera; Mexico	Jonathan Ruvalcaba; Dominican Republic	Luis Uribe; Colombia
3 m springboard	Osmar Olvera; Mexico	Luis Uribe; Colombia	Jack Ryan; United States
10 m platform	Randal Willars; Mexico	Nathan Zsombor-Murray; Canada	Kenny Zamudio; Mexico
Synchronized 3 m springboard	Mexico; Rodrigo Diego; Osmar Olvera	Colombia; Daniel Restrepo; Luis Uribe	United States; Tyler Downs; Jack Ryan
Synchronized 10 m platform	Mexico; Kevin Berlín; Randal Willars	Canada; Rylan Wiens; Nathan Zsombor-Murray	Colombia; Alejandro Solarte; Sebastián Villa

==== Women's events ====
Games	Gold	Silver	Bronze
1 m springboard	Pamela Ware; Canada	Mia Vallée; Canada	Hailey Hernandez; United States
3 m springboard	Pamela Ware; Canada	Arantxa Chávez; Mexico	Krysta Palmer; United States
10 m platform	Gabriela Agúndez; Mexico	Alejandra Orozco; Mexico	Caeli McKay; Canada
Synchronized 3 m springboard	Mexico; Arantxa Chávez; Paola Pineda	Canada; Mia Vallée; Pamela Ware	United States; Hailey Hernandez; Jordan Skilken
Synchronized 10 m platform	Mexico; Gabriela Agúndez; Alejandra Orozco	Canada; Caeli McKay; Kate Miller	Brazil; Ingrid Oliveira; Giovanna Pedroso

== See also ==
- Diving at the 2024 Summer Olympics
