= Kwon Ha-lim =

South Korean diver

Kwon Ha-lim 권하림
Personal information
- Native name: 권하림
- Full name: Kwon Ha-lim (권하림)
- Nickname: Kwon or Gwon
- National team: South Korea
- Citizenship: (South Korean)
- Born: 2 March 1999 (age 27) Seoul, South Korea
- Education: Seoul Physical Education High School
- Occupation: Athletes
- Years active: 2019 - present
- Height: 159 cm (5 ft 3 in)
- Weight: 60 kg (132 lb)

Sport
- Country: South Korea
- Sport: Diving
- Position: Athletes
- Events: 1 m, 3 m, 10 m, 10 m synchro
- Club: Gwangju Sports Council
- Coached by: Hong Myung-ho (national), Ko Byung-Jin (club)
Medal record
World University Games
| Silver medal – second place | 2021 Chengdu | Team |

Korean name
- Hangul: 권하림
- RR: Gwon Harim
- MR: Kwŏn Harim

Kwon Ha-lim (born 2 March 1999) is a South Korean diver. She qualified to compete at the 2020 Summer Olympics in the women's 10 metre platform diving event.

== Personal life and family ==
Her father won gold medal at the 1986 Asian Games in the uneven bar event
