= Tyler Downs =

American diver (born 2003)

Personal information
- Born: July 19, 2003 (age 23) St. Louis, Missouri, U.S.
- Home town: Ballwin, Missouri, U.S.
- Height: 5 ft 10 in (1.78 m)

Sport
- Country: United States
- Events: 3 meter springboard; 3 meter springboard synchro
- College team: Purdue University
- Club: Purdue Diving
- Coached by: Adam Soldati
Medal record
Men's diving
Representing United States
Pan American Games
Bronze medal – third place	2023 Santiago	3 m synchro
World Cup
Silver medal – second place	2022 Berlin	3 m synchro

Tyler Downs (born July 19, 2003) is an American competitive diver. He represented the United States at the 2020 Summer Olympics and the 2024 Summer Olympics.

== Early life and education ==
Tyler Downs was born on July 19, 2003, in St. Louis, Missouri. He is youngest of seven children born to Theresa and Donnie Downs. He attended Laurel Springs Online School, graduating in 2021.

== Diving career ==
Downs is a six time U.S. junior national diving champion. Downs competed at the 2015, 2017, and 2019 U.S. Junior Pan American Games. He competed at the 2019 Sagamihara and Beijing World Series. At the 2018 World Junior Diving Championships, he was the silver medalist in 1-meter. At the 2019 Junior Pan American Championships, he won gold on the 3-meter and synchronized 3-meter and bronze on the 1-meter and platform.

Downs qualified to represent the United States in the Men's 3 metre springboard at the 2020 Summer Olympics in Tokyo after triumphing in the event at the U.S. Olympic trials and in the process defeating his hero, David Boudia. However, in Tokyo he failed to proceed beyond the preliminary round, finishing 23rd in a field of 29 divers.

== Personal life ==
Downs lives in Ballwin, Missouri. He committed to attending Purdue University in West Lafayette, Indiana in the Fall 2021, to compete for the "Boilermakers" swimming and diving squad. As of September 22, 2022, however, he was no longer a student at Purdue.
