= Randal Willars =

Mexican diver (born 2002)

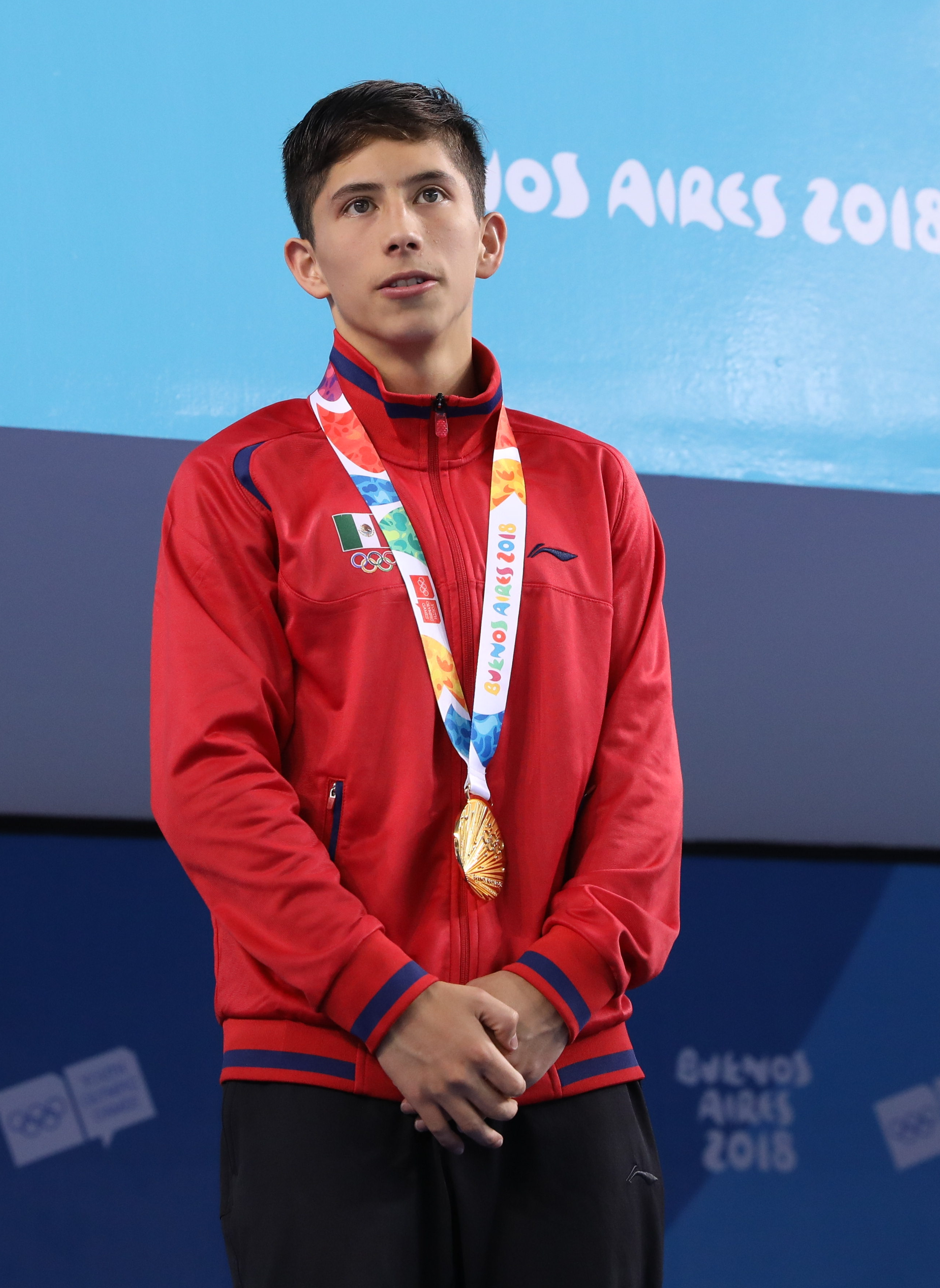
- Willars at the 2018 Summer Youth Olympics

Personal information
- Full name: Randal Willars Valdez
- Born: 30 April 2002 (age 24) Mexico City, Mexico

Sport
- Country: Mexico
- Sport: Diving
- Events: 10 m, 10 m synchro
Medal record
World Championships
Silver medal – second place	2023 Fukuoka	Team
Silver medal – second place	2024 Doha	Team event
Silver medal – second place	2025 Singapore	Team
Bronze medal – third place	2023 Fukuoka	10 m synchro
Bronze medal – third place	2025 Singapore	10 m platform
Pan American Games
Gold medal – first place	2023 Santiago	10 m platform
Gold medal – first place	2023 Santiago	10 m synchro
Youth Olympic Games
Gold medal – first place	2018 Buenos Aires	10 m platform
Junior Pan American Games
Gold medal – first place	2021 Cali-Valle	10 m platform
Silver medal – second place	2021 Cali-Valle	Mixed team
Bronze medal – third place	2021 Cali-Valle	3 m springboard

Randal Willars Valdez (Note: In this Spanish name, the first or paternal surname is Willars and the second or maternal family name is Valdez.) (born 30 April 2002) is a Mexican diver.

== Career ==
Willars competed in the 2018 Summer Youth Olympics, where he won the gold medal in the men's individual 10m platform event. He finished 5th in the 3-m springboard event.

At the 2021 FINA Diving World Cup Willars won the silver medal in the 10m platform event. Together with Iván García he won the silver medal in the Men's synchronised 10m platform event as well. He competed with Kevin Berlín at the 2024 Summer Olympics for Mexico and placed 4th in the men's 10m synchronised platform event.
