= Rodrigo Diego =

Mexican diver (born 1996)

Personal information
- Born: 2 December 1996 (age 29)

Sport
- Country: Mexico
- Sport: Diving
Medal record
Men's diving
Representing Mexico
Pan American Games
Gold medal – first place	2023 Santiago	3 m springboard
Summer Youth Olympics
Silver medal – second place	2014 Nanjing	3m springboard
Bronze medal – third place	2014 Nanjing	10m platform

Rodrigo Diego Lopez (born 2 December 1996) is a Mexican diver. He competed in the men's three metre springboard event at the 2016 Summer Olympics.
