= Luana Lira =

Brazilian diver (born 1996)

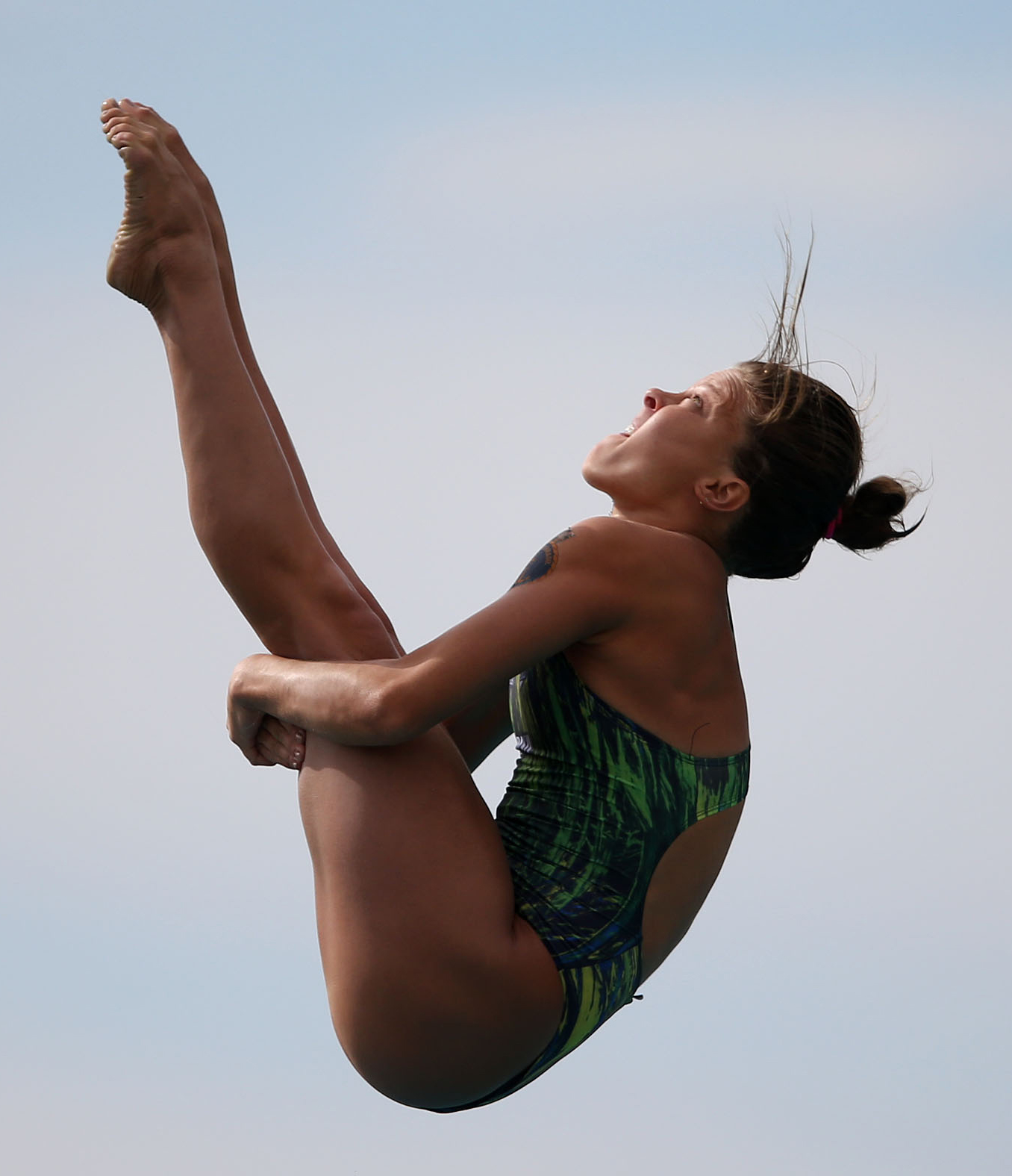
- Lira in 2016

Personal information
- Born: 5 March 1996 (age 30) João Pessoa, Brazil

Sport
- Country: Brazil
- Sport: Diving
Medal record
Women's diving
Representing Brazil
South American Games
Gold medal – first place	2026 Santa Fe	3 m springboard synchro
Silver medal – second place	2022 Asunción	1 m springboard
Bronze medal – third place	2022 Asunción	3 m springboard synchro
Bronze medal – third place	2026 Santa Fe	1 m springboard
Military World Games
Silver medal – second place	2019 Wuhan	Team

Luana Wanderley Moreira Lira (born 5 March 1996) is a Brazilian diver. She represented Brazil at the World Aquatics Championships in 2015, 2017, 2019, 2022 and 2024. She represented Brazil at the 2020 Summer Olympics in Tokyo, Japan. She competed in the women's 3 metre springboard event.

In 2019, she won the silver medal in the women's team event at the Military World Games held in Wuhan, China. She competed at the 2021 FINA Diving World Cup.
