= Jesús Liranzo =

Venezuelan diver (born 1995)

Personal information
- Nationality: Venezuelan
- Born: 2 November 1995 (age 30)
- Height: 1.74 m (5 ft 9 in)

Sport
- Sport: Diving
- Event: 10 metre platform

Jesús Ricardo Liranzo Graterol (born 2 November 1995) is a Venezuelan diver. He competed in the men's 10 metre platform at the 2016 Summer Olympics, where he finished 21st out of 28 competitors.
