= Diana Pineda =

Colombian diver (born 1984)

Personal information
- Full name: Diana Isabel Pineda Zuleta
- Born: September 6, 1984 (age 41) Medellín, Colombia
Medal record
Representing Colombia
Women's diving
Central American and Caribbean Games
Gold medal – first place	2023 San Salvador	1 m springboard
South American Games
Bronze medal – third place	2022 Asunción	1 m springboard
South American Championships
Silver medal – second place	2008 São Paulo	3m springboard
Silver medal – second place	2008 São Paulo	10m Synchro
Bronze medal – third place	2008 São Paulo	1m springboard

Diana Isabel Pineda Zuleta (born September 6, 1984) is a female diver from Colombia, who competed in two Summer Olympics for her native country, starting in 2000. She claimed three medals at the 2008 South American Swimming Championships in São Paulo.
