= Óscar Ariza =

Venezuelan diver (born 1999)

Personal information
- Nationality: Venezuela
- Born: 25 September 1999 (age 26) Valera, Venezuela

Sport
- Sport: Diving
- Event: 10 metre springboard
Medal record
Representing Venezuela
South American Games
Gold medal – first place	2022 Asuncion	10m platform synchro
Bronze medal – third place	2022 Asuncion	3m springboard synchro

Óscar Ariza (born 25 September 1999) is a Venezuelan diver.

He was awarded a fellowship to the FINA Development Center and trains in Kazan, Russia. At the 2021 FINA Diving World Cup, he placed 14th, securing qualification for the Olympic Games. He competed in the 10 m platform event at the 2020 Summer Olympics, coming 22nd overall.
