= Jonathan Ruvalcaba =

Dominican Republic diver (born 1991)

Personal information
- Full name: José Jonathan Ruvalcaba Peralta
- Nickname: Pato
- Born: 1 March 1991 (age 35) Mexico City, Mexico
- Height: 161 cm (5 ft 3 in)

Sport
- Country: Dominican Republic
- Sport: Diving
- Event(s): 3 m, 3 m synchro, 10 m, 10 m synchro
- Partner: Frandiel Gómez
- Former partner: Ivan Garcia
- Coached by: Francisco Rueda
Medal record
Representing Mexico
Pan American Games
| Bronze medal – third place | 2015 Toronto | 10 m platform |
Universiade
| Silver medal – second place | 2011 Shenzhen | 3 m platform synchro |
| Bronze medal – third place | 2011 Shenzhen | 10 m platform synchro |
Central American and Caribbean Games
| Silver medal – second place | 2014 Veracruz | 10 m platform |
Representing The Dominican Republic
Pan American Games
| Silver medal – second place | 2023 Santiago | 1 m springboard |
Central American and Caribbean Games
| Silver medal – second place | 2023 San Salvador | 1 m springboard |
| Silver medal – second place | 2023 San Salvador | 3 m springboard |

José Jonathan Ruvalcaba Peralta (born 1 March 1991) is a diver. Born in Mexico, he represents the Dominican Republic internationally and competed for his country of birth in the past. He won a bronze medal representing Mexico during the 2015 Pan American Games and silver at the 2014 Central American and Caribbean Games. He also went to the 2009, 2011 and 2015 World Aquatics Championships representing Mexico.

In 2019, he chose to represent the Dominican Republic in international competitions.

== Personal life ==
Ruvalcava is from Mexico City but trains, lives and represented León, Guanajuato before moving to the Dominican Republic. He confessed that he was inspired by Mexican diver and Olympic medalist Fernando Platas and his mother, who used to run marathons. His nicknamed Pato (Duck) and live and trains in León, Guanajuato with his coach Francisco Ruedas. He is married to a Dominican.

== Career ==
=== Early career ===
He started diving at five years old and when he was eight he went to his first national championship and was junior national bronze medalist in 2006.

=== 2009 ===
In the 2009 World Aquatics Championships, Ruvalcaba participated in the 3 metre springboard and he finished in the 17th position scoring 374.55 in the semifinals. He took part of the 10 metre platform and scored 390.35 in the final, finishing in the 11th place and the synchronized 3 metre springboard with Alejandro Islas, were they scored 385.50 and ranked 11th in the preliminary and 394.65 in the final, finishing in 10th place.

=== 2011 ===
Ruvalcaba won the Elite National Championship silver medal in synchronized 3 metre springboard with Rommel Pacheco. He ranked fifth in the FINA Grand Prix held in Penza, Russia, participating in the 3m springboard. Competing in the FINA/Midea Diving World Series with Rommel Pacheco as his partner, they ranked fourth in the synchronized 10 metre platform with 426.90.

After changing his coach from Iván Bautista to the last year with the Chinese Ma Jin and their daily hardwork, he achieved the berth to the World Championship in the 10 metre platform national qualifier, placing second to Iván Sánchez with 495.30 and beating the experienced Rommel Pacheco. During the World Championships, he participated in the 10 metre platform and placed 34th with a score of 298.45, not qualifying for the medal stages.

He went to the Summer Universiade where he won the silver medal in the synchronized 3 metre platform and bronze in the synchronized 10 metre platform, both of them with Rommel Pacheco was seventh in the 10 metre platform with 437.05 and with Pacheco, Jahir Ocampo and Julián Sánchez they ranked fourth in team competition with a 3202.82 score.

A successful year he considered to have during 2011 after all the results and claimed to be difficult but not impossible to achieve the dream of qualifying for the 2012 London Olympics in the remaining qualifier, the 2012 FINA World Cup.

=== 2012 ===
He won the bronze meal with Rommel Pacheco in the synchronized 3 metre platform at the FINA Grand Prix of Montreal, Canada. And debuting with Jahir Ocampo and scoring 379.62 in the synchronized 10 metre platform, they also won the bronze medal. Ruvalcaba then competed at the Bolzano, Italy leg of the FINA Grand Prix, winning bronze medal in both 3m springboard with 379.80 and 3m springboard synchro with Rommel Pacheco.

=== 2013 ===
During the FINA Grand Prix of Madrid, Spain, he won the bronze medal in the synchronized 3 metre platform with Carlos Moreno, scoring 371.01.

=== 2014 ===
Representing his home town of Guanajuato, he won the berth for the National Team that would represent Mexico in the Grand Prix of Spain and Germany. He won the gold medal after cumulating 462.35 points in the 10 metre platform and the gold with Diego Balleza synchronized 10 metre platform with 376.56. With Balleza, he won the FINA Grand Prix of Madrid, Spain synchronized 10 metre platform silver medal, when they scored 369.30 and with Carlos Moreno, scoring 381.99, they won the tournament bronze medal and placed 18th individually during the 3m springboard competition. He also won with Balleza the bronze medal in the FINA Grand Prix of Rostock, Germany, the second of their European tour with a total of 402.03 points. During the FINA Grand Prix held in Guanajuato, Ruvalcaba won the synchronized 10 metre platform bronze medal with Balleza with a 409.44 score and also the bronze in 10 metre platform, scoring 494.15.

In the Mexican qualifier for the 2014 Central American and Caribbean Games, he qualified in second place with 479.45, just behind Iván García in the 10 metre platform and were paired to perform together in the synchronized 10 metre platform but the synchronized 10 metre platform competition was scratched from the games for lacking participants.

He competed in the 2014 Pan American Sports Festival where he won the silver medal in 10 metre platform, recording 470.20 points and another silver in synchronized 10 metre platform with Diego Balleza, with a 420.03 score.

Ruvalcaba conquered the silver medal with a 483.25 performance in the 10 metre platform, and dedicated this medal to his family and coach and was already planning his 2015 competitions with the 2016 Olympic Games berth as main goal.

=== 2015 ===
During the Winter National Championships, Ruvalcaba secured a place in the national team that would travel to represent his home country in three different stages of the FINA Grand Prix after winning the gold medal in the 10 metre platform and the synchronized 3 metre springboard with Carlos Moreno. These winning helped him envisioned the fulfillment of his Olympic dream through qualifying at the Kazan World Championships later this year. At the FINA Grand Prix of Rostock, Germany, he performed with Digo Balleza and won the synchronized 10 metre platform bronze medal with a 400.30 score. He won 10 metre platform gold medal in the FINA Grand Prix at Leon, Guanajuato, Mexico with 472.85 and the synchronized 3 metre springboard with Carlos Moreno with 396.54.

Ruvalcaba qualified to represent his home country by winning the silver medal in the national qualifier for the 10 metre platform in his home town of Guanajuato.

Ruvalcaba won a place in the 2015 Pan American Games national team along with Diego Balleza in the synchronized 10 metre platform, but the Mexican National Federation ignored this qualifier and gave it to Ivan Garcia and Germán Sánchez. Nonetheless, Sánchez suffered from ligament strain in the shoulder and Ruvalcaba was given his spot. During the games, he won the bronze medal in the 10 metre platform and with Ivan Garcia he ranked fourth place in the synchronized 10 metre platform with a 381.19 score. After the games, he was awarded by the Guanajuato state government along with fellow athletes from the Guanajuato state: Mariana Nava, Goretti Zumaya and Ignacio Prado.

He went To Kazan, Russia to the 2015 World Championship and 2016 Summer Olympics Qualifier. As part of the Mexican team, he took part of the 10 metre platform, ranking 17th and qualifying for the semifinals with 428.90 also winning an Olympic spot for Mexico. He ranked 10th with 467.10 in the semifinals and finally with 442.15 ending up 12th and last in the final. Even though Ruvalcaba earned the Olympic spot for Mexico in the 10 metre platform, the Mexican National Federation required the diver to rank among the top 6 in the final event to earn that qualified spot under his own name, but he failed to fulfill this requirement.

Ruvalcaba went to the national Olympic qualifier tournament, facing Germán Sánchez and Diego Balleza in a close competition, but dropping to third place scoring 897.50at the end of the competition, behind Sánchez and Balleza who won gold with 972.30 and silver with 965.90, respectively. He also tried to earn the national spot for the synchronized 3 metre platform, ranking in third place with Carlos Moreno. He then awaited the evaluation from the National Federation that had to decide among all candidates for a place in the Rio 2016 Olympics.

=== 2016 ===
Regardless of the performance of Ruvalcaba, the Mexican National Federation lastly awarded Germán Sánchez with the olympic spot, mostly because of the national qualifier results.

After the selection, Ruvalcaba asked unsuccessfully for explanations and the Guanajuato State Sports Commission demanded clarification for the results of the process and the unclear parameters that finished with the ousting of two of their diving athletes, Ruvalcaba and Laura Sánchez.

Training in his home facility in Guanajuato, he met the Dominican diver Frandiel Gómez who went to Mexico to train with his coach Francisco Rueda and they considered the possibility of Ruvalcaba migrating to the Dominican Republic. He confessed that the selection process disturbed him emotionally and psychologically and migrating to the Dominican Republic save him from depression. Admitted that the training facilities existing in his welcoming country were not as good as he previously had, but he valued even more his peace and happiness.

After being denied an Olympic spot, he first tried to change nationalities, first trying with Colombia then headed to the Dominican Republic.

=== 2019 ===
He started officially representing the Dominican Republic after receiving the Dominican nationalization even though he have already joined the country in 2017. Nonetheless, he have to train in Mexico, because the National Aquatic Center of the Dominican Republic was under repair.

With his new country he obtained a score of 341.20 points only ranking in the 25th position and not qualifying for the semifinals in the 10 metre platform. With Frandiel Gómez he was 15th in the synchronized 3 metre springboard and 15th in the synchronized 10 metre platform, also with Gómez.

He went to the 2019 Pan American Games, representing the Dominican Republic. In the 3 metre springboard he qualified for the final with a 386.60 score and finished in eight place. He qualified in the 10 metre platform in tenth place before ending up in seventh place. Ruvalcaba partenered with Frandiel Gómez and ranked in sixth place in both the synchronized 3 metre springboard and synchronized 10 metre platform.

=== 2021 ===
Ruvalcaba participated in the final Tokyo 2020 qualifier, the FINA Diving World Cup held in Tokyo, Japan where he flew from his training facility since 2019, located in León, Guanajuato, Mexico. In the 10m platform competition, he scored 372.30 and did not make it to the semifinals, ranking in the 23th position. In the synchronised 3m springboard with Frandiel Gómez, he ranked 13th and did not make it to the final. In the synchronised 10m platform he ranked 14th with Gómez. In the 3m springboard he ranked 14th with a 401.90 mark in the preliminary, was 11th with 403.50 in the semifinals and finally ending up in sixth place with a 415.70 mark.

He achieved his dream of making it to Olympics when he secured a spot for his performance in the Men's 3 m springboard, when he qualified to the semifinals among the best 14 athletes.

Was one of the 64 athletes that represented the Dominican Republic at the 2020 Summer Olympics. He competed in the 3 metre springboard.

=== 2023 ===
At the 2023 Central American and Caribbean Games he won the silver medal in both 1 m and 3 m springboard.
