= Daniel Restrepo =

Colombian diver (born 2000)

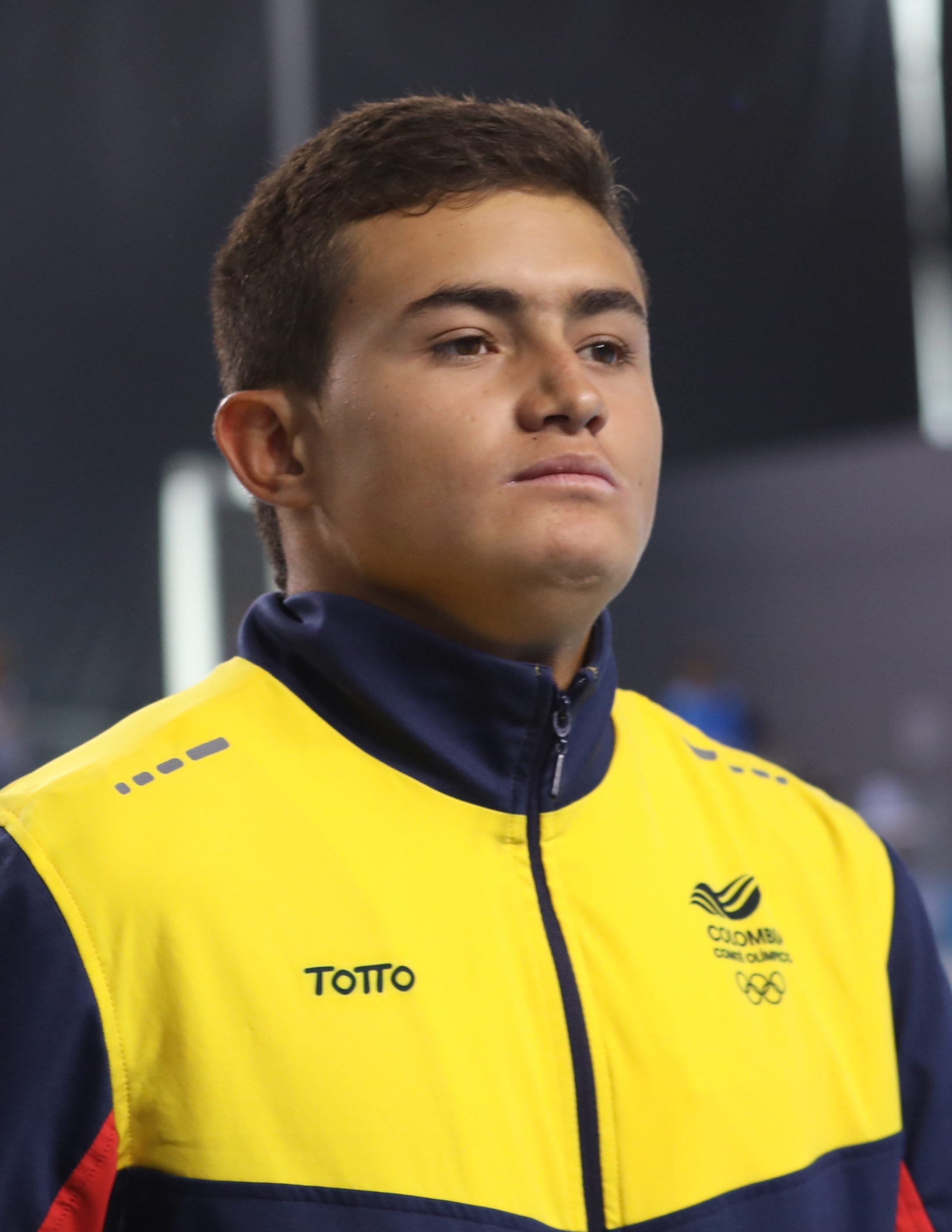
- Restrepo at the 2018 Youth Olympics

Personal information
- Full name: Daniel Restrepo García
- Nationality: Colombian
- Born: 24 March 2000 (age 26) Medellín, Colombia

Sport
- Country: Colombia
- Sport: Diving
- Events: 1 m springboard; 3 m springboard; 3 m synchro
Medal record
Men's Diving
Event	1st	2nd	3rd
Youth Olympic Games	2	0	0
World Junior Championships	1	0	1
Grand Prix	1	2	0
Pan American Games	1	1	0
CAC Games	0	1	0
Total	5	4	1
Representing Colombia
Pan American Games
Gold medal – first place	2019 Lima	3 m springboard
Silver medal – second place	2023 Santiago	3 m synchro
Central American and Caribbean Games
Silver medal – second place	2023 San Salvador	3 m synchro
Youth Olympic Games
Gold medal – first place	2018 Buenos Aires	3 m springboard
World Junior Championships
Gold medal – first place	2018 Kyiv	3 m springboard
Bronze medal – third place	2018 Kyiv	3 m synchro
Representing (International Olympic Committee) Mixed-NOCs
Youth Olympic Games
Gold medal – first place	2018 Buenos Aires	Mixed team

Daniel Restrepo García (born March 24, 2000) is a diver from Colombia. He won a gold medal at the 2019 Pan American Games in Lima, the first Pan American golden medal for Colombia at the sport.

He represented Colombia at the 2020 Summer Olympics in the Men's 3 m springboard event.

== International championships ==
Meet	1 m springboard	3 m springboard	10 m platform	3 m synchronised springboard	mixed team
Junior level
WJC 2018	5th (500.75)	(gold) (583.35)	20th (404.70)	(bronze) (290.88)	12th (233.70)
YOG 2018	—N/a	(gold) (576.05)	12th (370.85)	—N/a	(gold) (391.35)
Senior level
WC 2017	20th (339.50)				
WC 2019	18th (328.05)	14th (413.95)		9th (381.36)	
PAG 2019	8th (366.20)	(gold) (468.10)		4th (389.31)	—N/a
OG 2020	—N/a	17th (329.30)			—N/a
CAC 2023		4th (408.90)		(silver) (361.47)	—N/a
WC 2023	23rd (318.35)	10th (328.80)		17th (334.32)	
PAG 2023	8th (339.35)	5th (392.20)		(silver) (398.67)	—N/a
WC 2024				17th (320.13)	
OG 2024	—N/a	20th (361.10)			—N/a
