= Sebastián Morales =

Colombian diver (born 1994)

Personal information
- Full name: Sebastián Morales Mendoza
- Nationality: Colombia
- Born: 22 August 1994 (age 32)
- Height: 1.71 m (5 ft 7 in)
- Weight: 65 kg (143 lb)

Sport
- Sport: Diving
- Events: 1 m springboard, 3 m springboard, 3 m synchro
Medal record
Representing Colombia
Men's diving
Central American and Caribbean Games
Gold medal – first place	2014 Veracruz	1 m springboard
Gold medal – first place	2014 Veracruz	3 m springboard
Gold medal – first place	2023 San Salvador	1 m springboard
Silver medal – second place	2014 Veracruz	3 m synchro
Silver medal – second place	2018 Barranquilla	1 m springboard
Silver medal – second place	2018 Barranquilla	3 m springboard
Silver medal – second place	2018 Barranquilla	3 m synchro
Silver medal – second place	2026 Santo Domingo	3 m synchro
South American Games
Gold medal – first place	2022 Asunción	3 m synchro
Gold medal – first place	2026 Santa Fe	1 m springboard
Silver medal – second place	2022 Asunción	1 m springboard
Silver medal – second place	2022 Asunción	3 m springboard
Silver medal – second place	2026 Santa Fe	3 m springboard
Bronze medal – third place	2014 Santiago	3 m springboard

Sebastián Morales Mendoza (Note: In this Spanish name, the first or paternal surname is Morales and the second or maternal family name is Mendoza.) (born 22 August 1994) is a Colombian diver. He competed in the men's 3 metre springboard at the 2016 Summer Olympics, where he reached the final round, finishing 12th out of 29 competitors.

He represented Colombia at the 2020 Summer Olympics.
