= Anisley García =

Cuban diver (born 2002)

Personal information
- Nationality: Cuban
- Born: 19 January 2002 (age 24)

Sport
- Sport: Diving
Medal record
Women's diving
Representing Cuba
Central American and Caribbean Games
Silver medal – second place	2023 San Salvador	10 m synchro mixed

Anisley García (born 19 January 2002) is a Cuban diver. She competed in the women's 1 metre springboard event at the 2019 World Aquatics Championships. She finished in 22nd place in the preliminary round.
