= Diving at the Pan American Games =

- No. of events: 10 (men: 5; women: 5)

Diving has been a sport of the Pan American Games since the 1951 edition.

== Events ==
| Event | Edition | | | | | | | | | | | | | | | | | | | Year |
|---|---|---|---|---|---|---|---|---|---|---|---|---|---|---|---|---|---|---|---|---|
| Event | Argentina | Mexico | USA | Brazil | Canada | Colombia | Mexico | Puerto Rico | Venezuela | USA | Cuba | Argentina | Canada | Dominican Republic | Brazil | Mexico | Canada | Peru | Chile | Year |
| Event | 1951 | 1955 | 1959 | 1963 | 1967 | 1971 | 1975 | 1979 | 1983 | 1987 | 1991 | 1995 | 1999 | 2003 | 2007 | 2011 | 2015 | 2019 | 2023 | Year |
| Men's 3 m springboard | • | • | • | • | • | • | • | • | • | • | • | • | • | • | • | • | • | • | • | 19 |
| Men's 10 m platform | • | • | • | • | • | • | • | • | • | • | • | • | • | • | • | • | • | • | • | 19 |
| Women's 3 m springboard | • | • | • | • | • | • | • | • | • | • | • | • | • | • | • | • | • | • | • | 19 |
| Women's 10 m platform | • | • | • | • | • | • | • | • | • | • | • | • | • | • | • | • | • | • | • | 19 |
| Men's 3 m synchro springboard | | | | | | | | | | | | | | • | • | • | • | • | • | 6 |
| Men's 10 m synchro platform | | | | | | | | | | | | | | • | • | • | • | • | • | 6 |
| Women's 3 m synchro springboard | | | | | | | | | | | | | | • | • | • | • | • | • | 6 |
| Women's 10 m synchro platform | | | | | | | | | | | | | | • | • | • | • | • | • | 6 |
| Men's 1 m springboard | | | | | | | | | | | • | • | | | | | | • | • | 4 |
| Women's 1 m springboard | | | | | | | | | | | • | • | | | | | | • | • | 4 |
| Total events | 4 | 4 | 4 | 4 | 4 | 4 | 4 | 4 | 4 | 4 | 6 | 6 | 4 | 8 | 8 | 8 | 8 | 10 | 10 | |

== Medal table ==
Updated after the 2023 Pan American Games.

| Rank | Nation | Gold | Silver | Bronze | Total |
|---|---|---|---|---|---|
| 1 | United States | 40 | 42 | 43 | 125 |
| 2 | Mexico | 38 | 25 | 22 | 85 |
| 3 | Canada | 25 | 24 | 22 | 71 |
| 4 | Cuba | 4 | 7 | 7 | 18 |
| 5 | Colombia | 1 | 3 | 8 | 12 |
| 6 | Brazil | 0 | 4 | 5 | 9 |
| 7 | Argentina | 0 | 1 | 1 | 2 |
| 8 | Dominican Republic | 0 | 1 | 0 | 1 |
| 8 | Jamaica | 0 | 1 | 0 | 1 |
| Totals (9 entries) | | 108 | 108 | 108 | 324 |
