= Diving at the 2024 Summer Olympics – Qualification =

This article details the qualifying phase for diving at the 2024 Summer Olympics. The competition at these Games comprised a total of 136 divers coming from their respective National Olympic Committees (NOCs); each NOC could enter a maximum of two divers per gender in the individual events and a gender-based pair in the synchronized events, respecting a sixteen-member (eight per gender) country limit. To be eligible for the Games, all divers must have been 14 years old or older on or before December 31, 2023; and must have participated in various international meets approved by World Aquatics.

== Timeline ==
Event	Date	Venue
2023 European Games	June 22–28, 2023	(Poland) Rzeszów
2023 World Aquatics Championships	July 14–22, 2023	(Japan) Fukuoka
2022 Asian Games	September 23–October 8, 2023	(China) Hangzhou
2023 Pan American Games	October 20–25, 2023	(Chile) Santiago
2023 Oceania Diving Championships	November 30–December 1, 2023	(Australia) Brisbane
2023 African Diving Qualifier	December 18–20, 2023	(South Africa) Durban
2024 World Aquatics Championships	February 2–10, 2024	(Qatar) Doha
Re-allocation of unused quota	June 2024	—

== Qualification summary ==
Nation	Synchronized diving				Individual diving				Total	
Nation	Men's 3 m	Men's 10 m	Women's 3 m	Women's 10m	Men's 3 m	Men's 10 m	Women's 3 m	Women's 10 m	Quotas	Athletes
Australia	—N/a	Yes	Yes	—N/a	1	2	2	2	9	9
Austria	—N/a	—N/a	—N/a	—N/a		1			1	1
Brazil	—N/a	—N/a	—N/a	—N/a		1		1	2	2
Canada	—N/a	Yes	—N/a	Yes		2	1	2	7	5
China	Yes	Yes	Yes	Yes	2	2	2	2	12	10
Colombia	—N/a	—N/a	—N/a	—N/a	2	1			3	3
Cuba	—N/a	—N/a	—N/a	—N/a			2	1	3	2
Dominican Republic	—N/a	—N/a	—N/a	—N/a	2			1	3	3
Egypt	—N/a	—N/a	—N/a	—N/a	1	1	1	1	4	4
France	Yes	Yes	Yes	Yes	2				6	9
Germany	—N/a	Yes	Yes	—N/a	2	1	2	2	9	9
Great Britain	Yes	Yes	Yes	Yes	2	2	2	2	12	11
Ireland	—N/a	—N/a	—N/a	—N/a	1			1	2	2
Italy	Yes	—N/a	Yes	—N/a	2	2	2	2	10	8
Jamaica	—N/a	—N/a	—N/a	—N/a	1				1	1
Japan	—N/a	—N/a	—N/a	—N/a	1	1	2	1	5	5
Latvia	—N/a	—N/a	—N/a	—N/a				1	1	1
Malaysia	—N/a	—N/a	—N/a	—N/a		1	1		2	2
Mexico	Yes	Yes	—N/a	Yes	2	2	2	2	11	9
Netherlands	—N/a	—N/a	—N/a	—N/a				1	1	1
New Zealand	—N/a	—N/a	—N/a	—N/a			1		1	1
North Korea	—N/a	—N/a	—N/a	Yes		1		1	3	3
Norway	—N/a	—N/a	—N/a	—N/a			1		1	1
Poland	—N/a	—N/a	—N/a	—N/a		1			1	1
Puerto Rico	—N/a	—N/a	—N/a	—N/a				1	1	1
South Africa	—N/a	—N/a	—N/a	—N/a			1		1	1
South Korea	—N/a	—N/a	—N/a	—N/a	2	2	1	1	6	6
Spain	Yes	—N/a	—N/a	—N/a			1	1	3	4
Sweden	—N/a	—N/a	—N/a	—N/a			1		1	1
Ukraine	Yes	Yes	Yes	Yes		1	1	1	7	9
United States	Yes	—N/a	Yes	Yes	2	2	2	2	11	11
Uzbekistan	—N/a	—N/a	—N/a	—N/a		1			1	1
Total: 32 NOCs	8	8	8	8	25	26	28	29	140	136

== Synchronized diving ==
Each synchronized diving event featured eight teams from their respective NOCs, composed of the following:

- 3: the top three (or the medal-winning) pairs at the 2023 FINA World Championships, from July 14 to 30, in Fukuoka, Japan
- 4: the top four pairs vying for qualification at the 2024 FINA World Championships, from February 2 to 18, in Doha, Qatar
- 1: reserved for the host country France.

If the host country France qualified for a quota in either championship, or any of the teams with quotas from the 2023 event take a quota place in 2024, the next team in line would have been awarded the quota place for that championship. For example, fourth place United States was thus awarded a quota in the men's 3-meter synchronized springboard following France's third-place finish in 2023. Furthermore, additional countries were awarded a quota in the both men's and women’s 3-meter synchronized springboard and 10-meter synchronized platform following China’s successive gold medal wins in both 2023 and 2024.

=== Men's 3 m synchronized springboard ===
Event	Places	Nation	Qualified divers	Selected divers
Host nation	1	France	—N/a	Jules Bouyer; Alexis Jandard
2023 World Aquatics Championships	3	China	Wang Zongyuan; Long Daoyi	Wang Zongyuan; Long Daoyi
2023 World Aquatics Championships	3	Great Britain	Anthony Harding; Jack Laugher	Anthony Harding; Jack Laugher
2023 World Aquatics Championships	3	United States	Tyler Downs; Greg Duncan	Tyler Downs; Greg Duncan
2024 World Aquatics Championships	4	Italy	Lorenzo Marsaglia; Giovanni Tocci	Lorenzo Marsaglia; Giovanni Tocci
2024 World Aquatics Championships	4	Mexico	Rodrigo Diego; Osmar Olvera	Juan Celaya; Osmar Olvera
2024 World Aquatics Championships	4	Spain	Adrián Abadía; Nicolás García	Adrián Abadía; Nicolás García
2024 World Aquatics Championships	4	Ukraine	Oleh Kolodiy; Danylo Konovalov	Oleh Kolodiy; Danylo Konovalov
Total	8			

=== Men's 10 m synchronized platform ===
Event	Places	Nation	Qualified divers	Selected divers
Host nation	1	France	—N/a	Gary Hunt; Loïs Szymczak
2023 World Aquatics Championships	3	China	Lian Junjie; Yang Hao	Lian Junjie; Yang Hao
2023 World Aquatics Championships	3	Mexico	Kevin Berlín; Randal Willars	Kevin Berlín; Randal Willars
2023 World Aquatics Championships	3	Ukraine	Oleksiy Sereda; Kirill Boliukh	Mark Hrytsenko; Kirill Boliukh
2024 World Aquatics Championships	4	Australia	Cassiel Rousseau; Domonic Bedggood	Cassiel Rousseau; Domonic Bedggood
2024 World Aquatics Championships	4	Canada	Nathan Zsombor-Murray; Rylan Wiens	Nathan Zsombor-Murray; Rylan Wiens
2024 World Aquatics Championships	4	Germany	Timo Barthel; Jaden Eikermann	Timo Barthel; Jaden Eikermann
2024 World Aquatics Championships	4	Great Britain	Tom Daley; Noah Williams	Tom Daley; Noah Williams
Total	8			

=== Women's 3 m synchronized springboard ===
Event	Places	Nation	Qualified divers	Selected divers
Host nation	1	France	—N/a	Naïs Gillet; Juliette Landi
2023 World Aquatics Championships	3	China	Chang Yani; Chen Yiwen	Chang Yani; Chen Yiwen
2023 World Aquatics Championships	3	Great Britain	Yasmin Harper; Scarlett Mew Jensen	Yasmin Harper; Scarlett Mew Jensen
2023 World Aquatics Championships	3	Italy	Elena Bertocchi; Chiara Pellacani	Elena Bertocchi; Chiara Pellacani
2024 World Aquatics Championships	4	Australia	Anabelle Smith; Maddison Keeney	Anabelle Smith; Maddison Keeney
2024 World Aquatics Championships	4	Germany	Lena Hentschel; Jette Müller	Lena Hentschel; Jette Müller
2024 World Aquatics Championships	4	Ukraine	Anna Pysmenska; Viktoriya Kesar	Anna Pysmenska; Viktoriya Kesar
2024 World Aquatics Championships	4	United States	Krysta Palmer; Alison Gibson	Kassidy Cook; Sarah Bacon
Total	8			

=== Women's 10 m synchronized platform ===
Event	Places	Nation	Qualified divers	Selected divers
Host nation	1	France	—N/a	Jade Gillet; Emily Hallifax
2023 World Aquatics Championships	3	China	Chen Yuxi; Quan Hongchan	Chen Yuxi; Quan Hongchan
2023 World Aquatics Championships	3	Great Britain	Andrea Spendolini-Sirieix; Lois Toulson	Andrea Spendolini-Sirieix; Lois Toulson
2023 World Aquatics Championships	3	United States	Delaney Schnell; Jessica Parratto	Jessica Parratto; Delaney Schnell
2024 World Aquatics Championships	4	Canada	Caeli McKay; Kate Miller	Caeli McKay; Kate Miller
2024 World Aquatics Championships	4	Mexico	Gabriela Agúndez; Alejandra Orozco	Gabriela Agúndez; Alejandra Orozco
2024 World Aquatics Championships	4	North Korea	Kim Mi-rae; Jo Jin-mi	Kim Mi-rae; Jo Jin-mi
2024 World Aquatics Championships	4	Ukraine	Kseniia Bailo; Sofiia Lyskun	Kseniia Bailo; Sofiia Lyskun
Total	8			

== Individual diving ==
The qualification spots for each of the individual springboard and platform diving events (both men and women) were attributed as follows:

- 2023 World Championships – The top twelve finalists of each individual event obtained a quota place for their NOC at the 2023 World Aquatics Championships, from July 14 to 30, in Fukuoka, Japan.
- Continental Qualification Tournaments – The winners of each individual event obtained a quota place for their NOC at one of the five continental meets (Africa, the Americas, Asia, Europe, and Oceania) approved by World Aquatics.
- 2024 World Championships – Twelve highest-ranked divers eligible for qualification obtained a quota place for their NOC in each individual event at the 2024 FINA World Championships, from February 2 to 18, in Doha, Qatar, respecting the two-member country limit and without surpassing the total quota of 136.
- Reallocation – Additional spots were entitled to the eligible divers placed thirteenth and above in their corresponding individual events, respecting the two-member country limit, at the 2024 World Aquatics Championships until they attain the total quota of 136.
- Host nation – As the host country, France reserved four men's and four women's spots to be distributed in each of the individual diving events.

=== Men's 3 m springboard ===
Event	Places	Nation	Qualified diver	Selected diver
2023 World Aquatics Championships	12	China	Long Daoyi	Xie Siyi
2023 World Aquatics Championships	12	China	Wang Zongyuan	Wang Zongyuan
2023 World Aquatics Championships	12	Colombia	Daniel Restrepo	Luis Uribe
2023 World Aquatics Championships	12	Germany	Lars Rüdiger	Lars Rüdiger
2023 World Aquatics Championships	12	Germany	Moritz Wesemann	Moritz Wesemann
2023 World Aquatics Championships	12	Great Britain	Daniel Goodfellow	Jack Laugher
2023 World Aquatics Championships	12	Italy	Lorenzo Marsaglia	Lorenzo Marsaglia
2023 World Aquatics Championships	12	Italy	Giovanni Tocci	Giovanni Tocci
2023 World Aquatics Championships	12	Mexico	Rodrigo Diego	Kevin Muñoz
2023 World Aquatics Championships	12	Mexico	Osmar Olvera	Osmar Olvera
2023 World Aquatics Championships	12	United States	Andrew Capobianco	Andrew Capobianco
2023 World Aquatics Championships	12	United States	Tyler Downs	Carson Tyler
2023 European Games	0	—N/a		
2022 Asian Games	0	—N/a		
2023 Pan American Games	0	—N/a		
2023 Oceania Diving Championships	1	Australia	Li Shixin	Kurtis Mathews
2023 African Diving Qualifier	1	Egypt	Mohamed Farouk	Mohamed Farouk
2024 World Aquatics Championships	6	Colombia	Luis Uribe	Daniel Restrepo
2024 World Aquatics Championships	6	France	Jules Bouyer	Jules Bouyer
2024 World Aquatics Championships	6	France	Gwendal Bisch	Gwendal Bisch
2024 World Aquatics Championships	6	Great Britain	Ross Haslam	Jordan Houlden
2024 World Aquatics Championships	6	Japan	Sho Sakai	Sho Sakai
2024 World Aquatics Championships	6	South Korea	Woo Ha-ram	Woo Ha-ram
Reallocation of unused quota	5	Dominican Republic	Jonathan Ruvalcaba	Jonathan Ruvalcaba
Reallocation of unused quota	5	Jamaica	Yona Knight-Wisdom	Yona Knight-Wisdom
Reallocation of unused quota	5	South Korea	Yi Jae-gyeong	Yi Jae-gyeong
Reallocation of unused quota	5	Ireland	Jake Passmore	Jake Passmore
Reallocation of unused quota	5	Dominican Republic	Frandiel Gómez	Frandiel Gómez
Total	25			

=== Men's 10 m platform ===
Event	Places	Nation	Qualified diver	Selected diver
2023 World Aquatics Championships	12	Australia	Cassiel Rousseau	Cassiel Rousseau
2023 World Aquatics Championships	12	Brazil	Isaac Souza	~~Isaac Souza~~
2023 World Aquatics Championships	12	Canada	Nathan Zsombor-Murray	Nathan Zsombor-Murray
2023 World Aquatics Championships	12	China	Lian Junjie	Cao Yuan
2023 World Aquatics Championships	12	China	Yang Hao	Yang Hao
2023 World Aquatics Championships	12	Great Britain	Kyle Kothari	Kyle Kothari
2023 World Aquatics Championships	12	Great Britain	Noah Williams	Noah Williams
2023 World Aquatics Championships	12	Japan	Rikuto Tamai	Rikuto Tamai
2023 World Aquatics Championships	12	Malaysia	Bertrand Rhodict Lises	Bertrand Rhodict Lises
2023 World Aquatics Championships	12	Mexico	Randal Willars	Randal Willars
2023 World Aquatics Championships	12	South Korea	Kim Yeong-taek	Kim Yeong-taek
2023 World Aquatics Championships	12	Ukraine	Oleksiy Sereda	Oleksiy Sereda
2023 European Games	1	Germany	Timo Barthel	Timo Barthel
2022 Asian Games	0	—N/a		
2023 Pan American Games	0	—N/a		
2023 Oceania Diving Championships	1	Australia	Sam Fricker	Jaxon Bowshire
2023 African Diving Qualifier	1	Egypt	Ramez Sobhy	Ramez Sobhy
2024 World Aquatics Championships	5	Canada	Rylan Wiens	Rylan Wiens
2024 World Aquatics Championships	5	Mexico	Kevin Berlín	Kevin Berlín
2024 World Aquatics Championships	5	Poland	Robert Łukaszewicz	Robert Łukaszewicz
2024 World Aquatics Championships	5	United States	Brandon Loschiavo	Carson Tyler
2024 World Aquatics Championships	5	Uzbekistan	Igor Myalin	Igor Myalin
Reallocation of unused quota	7	Colombia	Sebastián Villa	Alejandro Solarte
Reallocation of unused quota	7	North Korea	Im Yong-myong	Im Yong-myong
Reallocation of unused quota	7	Italy	Andreas Sargent Larsen	Andreas Sargent Larsen
Reallocation of unused quota	7	Italy	Riccardo Giovannini	Riccardo Giovannini
Reallocation of unused quota	7	Austria	Anton Knoll	Anton Knoll
Reallocation of unused quota	7	South Korea	Shin Jung-whi	Shin Jung-whi
Reallocation of unused quota	7	United States	Joshua Hedberg	Brandon Loschiavo
Total	26			

=== Women's 3 m springboard ===
Event	Places	Nation	Qualified diver	Selected diver
2023 World Aquatics Championships	12	Australia	Maddison Keeney	Maddison Keeney
2023 World Aquatics Championships	12	Canada	Pamela Ware	Margo Erlam
2023 World Aquatics Championships	12	China	Chang Yani	Chang Yani
2023 World Aquatics Championships	12	China	Chen Yiwen	Chen Yiwen
2023 World Aquatics Championships	12	Great Britain	Scarlett Mew Jensen	Yasmin Harper
2023 World Aquatics Championships	12	Italy	Elena Bertocchi	Elena Bertocchi
2023 World Aquatics Championships	12	Italy	Chiara Pellacani	Chiara Pellacani
2023 World Aquatics Championships	12	Japan	Sayaka Mikami	Sayaka Mikami
2023 World Aquatics Championships	12	South Africa	Julia Vincent	Julia Vincent
2023 World Aquatics Championships	12	Sweden	Emilia Nilsson Garip	Emilia Nilsson Garip
2023 World Aquatics Championships	12	United States	Sarah Bacon	Sarah Bacon
2023 World Aquatics Championships	12	United States	Hailey Hernandez	Alison Gibson
2023 European Games	0	—N/a		
2022 Asian Games	0	—N/a		
2023 Pan American Games	0	—N/a		
2023 Oceania Diving Championships	1	Australia	Georgia Sheehan	Alysha Koloi
2023 African Diving Qualifier	1	Egypt	Maha Amer	Maha Amer
2024 World Aquatics Championships	6	Germany	Lena Hentschel	Lena Hentschel
2024 World Aquatics Championships	6	Great Britain	Grace Reid	Grace Reid
2024 World Aquatics Championships	6	Japan	Haruka Enomoto	Haruka Enomoto
2024 World Aquatics Championships	6	Mexico	Aranza Vázquez	Aranza Vázquez
2024 World Aquatics Championships	6	South Korea	Kim Su-ji	Kim Su-ji
2024 World Aquatics Championships	6	Ukraine	Viktoriya Kesar	Viktoriya Kesar
Reallocation of unused quota	8	Germany	Saskia Oettinghaus	Saskia Oettinghaus
Reallocation of unused quota	8	Cuba	Prisis Ruiz	Prisis Ruiz
Reallocation of unused quota	8	Spain	María Papworth	Valeria Antolino
Reallocation of unused quota	8	Norway	Helle Tuxen	Helle Tuxen
Reallocation of unused quota	8	Cuba	Anisley García	Anisley García
Reallocation of unused quota	8	New Zealand	Elizabeth Roussel	Elizabeth Roussel
Reallocation of unused quota	8	Mexico	Alejandra Estudillo	Alejandra Estudillo
Reallocation of unused quota	8	Malaysia	Nur Dhabitah Sabri	Nur Dhabitah Sabri
Total	28			

=== Women's 10 m platform ===
Event	Places	Nation	Qualified diver	Selected diver
2023 World Aquatics Championships	12	Brazil	Ingrid Oliveira	Ingrid Oliveira
2023 World Aquatics Championships	12	Canada	Caeli McKay	Caeli McKay
2023 World Aquatics Championships	12	China	Quan Hongchan	Quan Hongchan
2023 World Aquatics Championships	12	China	Chen Yuxi	Chen Yuxi
2023 World Aquatics Championships	12	Germany	Christina Wassen	Christina Wassen
2023 World Aquatics Championships	12	Germany	Elena Wassen	Pauline Pfeif
2023 World Aquatics Championships	12	Great Britain	Lois Toulson	Lois Toulson
2023 World Aquatics Championships	12	Japan	Matsuri Arai	Matsuri Arai
2023 World Aquatics Championships	12	Mexico	Gabriela Agúndez	Gabriela Agúndez
2023 World Aquatics Championships	12	Mexico	Alejandra Orozco	Alejandra Orozco
2023 World Aquatics Championships	12	Spain	Ana Carvajal	Ana Carvajal
2023 World Aquatics Championships	12	United States	Delaney Schnell	Delaney Schnell
2023 European Games	1	Great Britain	Eden Cheng	Andrea Spendolini-Sirieix
2022 Asian Games	0	—N/a		
2023 Pan American Games	0	—N/a		
2023 Oceania Diving Championships	1	Australia	Nikita Hains	Ellie Cole
2023 African Diving Qualifier	1	Egypt	Malak Tawfik	Malak Tawfik
2024 World Aquatics Championships	4	Australia	Melissa Wu	Melissa Wu
2024 World Aquatics Championships	4	Italy	Sarah Jodoin di Maria	Sarah Jodoin di Maria
2024 World Aquatics Championships	4	Netherlands	Else Praasterink	Else Praasterink
2024 World Aquatics Championships	4	North Korea	Kim Mi-rae	Kim Mi-rae
Reallocation of unused quota	10	~~Japan~~	~~Rin Kaneto~~	
Reallocation of unused quota	10	Puerto Rico	Maycey Vieta	Maycey Vieta
Reallocation of unused quota	10	South Korea	Kim Na-hyun	Kim Na-hyun
Reallocation of unused quota	10	Ukraine	Sofiya Lyskun	Sofiya Lyskun
Reallocation of unused quota	10	Italy	Maia Biginelli	Maia Biginelli
Reallocation of unused quota	10	Cuba	Anisley García	Anisley García
Reallocation of unused quota	10	United States	Katrina Young	Daryn Wright
Reallocation of unused quota	10	Latvia	Džeja Patrika	Džeja Patrika
Reallocation of unused quota	10	Dominican Republic	Victoria Garza	Victoria Garza
Reallocation of unused quota	10	Canada	Kate Miller	Kate Miller
Reallocation of unused quota	10	Ireland	Ciara McGing	Ciara McGing
Total	29			
