= Diving at the 2025 World Aquatics Championships – Women's 10 metre platform =

Women's 10 metre platform at the Diving at the 2025 World Aquatics Championships
- Venue: OCBC Aquatic Centre
- Location: Singapore
- Dates: 30 July (preliminaries); 31 July (semifinal and final)
- Competitors: 37 from 26 nations
- Winning points: 430.50

Medalists
gold medal	Chen Yuxi	China
silver medal	Pauline Pfeif	Germany
bronze medal	Xie Peiling	China

The Women's 10 metre platform competition at the 2025 World Aquatics Championships was held on 30 and 31 July 2025.

== Results ==
The preliminary round was started on 30 July at 10:02. The semifinal was held on 31 July at 15:32. The final was started on 31 July at 18:15.

Green denotes finalists

Blue denotes semifinalists

Rank	Diver	Nationality	Preliminary		Semifinal		Final	
Rank	Diver	Nationality	Points	Rank	Points	Rank	Points	Rank
1st place, gold medalist(s)	Chen Yuxi	China	396.50	1	394.65	1	430.50	1
2nd place, silver medalist(s)	Pauline Pfeif	Germany	310.95	4	340.75	3	367.10	2
3rd place, bronze medalist(s)	Xie Peiling	China	337.50	2	317.50	4	358.20	3
4	Katelyn Fung	Canada	285.20	12	314.80	5	343.20	4
5	Ellie Cole	Australia	305.70	8	312.00	6	340.00	5
6	Jo Jin-mi	North Korea	323.50	3	348.10	2	338.00	6
7	Ekaterina Beliaeva	Neutral Athletes B	308.70	5	293.00	10	335.10	7
8	Bayleigh Cranford	United States	302.45	10	310.15	8	329.50	8
9	Sarah Jodoin Di Maria	Italy	267.85	18	292.30	11	317.90	9
10	Rin Kaneto	Japan	306.25	6	305.70	9	306.20	10
11	Ella Roselli	United States	292.50	11	311.80	7	290.20	11
12	Alejandra Estudillo	Mexico	304.80	9	281.40	12	288.70	12
13	Maisie Bond	Great Britain	305.80	7	271.30	13	Did not advance	
14	Else Praasterink	Netherlands	279.05	15	266.65	14	Did not advance	
15	Moon Na-yun	South Korea	280.00	14	262.40	15	Did not advance	
16	Yulia Timoshinina	Neutral Athletes B	273.25	16	246.95	16	Did not advance	
17	Ainslee Kwang	Singapore	285.00	13	242.35	17	Did not advance	
18	Abigail González	Mexico	271.10	17	228.50	18	Did not advance	
19	Sofiya Lyskun	Ukraine	255.95	19	Did not advance			
20	Anisley García	Cuba	251.75	20	Did not advance			
21	Ana Carvajal	Spain	249.70	21	Did not advance			
22	Valeria Antolino	Spain	249.00	22	Did not advance			
23	Victoria Garza	Dominican Republic	246.80	23	Did not advance			
24	Jade Gillet	France	246.35	24	Did not advance			
25	Juliana Giron	Colombia	245.45	25	Did not advance			
26	Maggie Grey	Australia	243.60	26	Did not advance			
27	Kate Miller	Canada	242.05	27	Did not advance			
28	Ko Hyeon-ju	South Korea	241.95	28	Did not advance			
29	Lee Yiat Qing	Malaysia	240.20	29	Did not advance			
30	Emily Hallifax	France	228.10	30	Did not advance			
31	Giovanna Pedroso	Brazil	222.30	31	Did not advance			
32	Mariana Osorio	Colombia	217.45	32	Did not advance			
33	Marysia Łukaszewicz	Poland	206.45	33	Did not advance			
34	Nicoleta Angelica Muscalu	Romania	175.15	34	Did not advance			
35	Shravani Suryawanshi	India	146.40	35	Did not advance			
36	Alisa Zakaryan	Armenia	145.60	36	Did not advance			
37	Palak Sharma	India	132.10	37	Did not advance			
