= Diving at the 2023 World Aquatics Championships – Women's synchronized 10 metre platform =

Women's synchronized 10 metre platform at the 2023 World Aquatics Championships
- Venue: Fukuoka Prefectural Pool
- Location: Fukuoka, Japan
- Dates: 16 July (preliminary and final)
- Competitors: 24 from 12 nations
- Teams: 12
- Winning points: 369.84

Medalists
gold medal	Chen Yuxi; Quan Hongchan	China
silver medal	Andrea Spendolini-Sirieix; Lois Toulson	Great Britain
bronze medal	Jessica Parratto; Delaney Schnell	United States

The women's synchronized 10 metre platform competition at the 2023 World Aquatics Championships was held on 16 July 2023.

== Results ==
The preliminary round was started at 10:00. The final was held at 18:00.

Rank	Nation	Divers	Preliminary		Final	
Rank	Nation	Divers	Points	Rank	Points	Rank
1st place, gold medalist(s)	China	Chen Yuxi; Quan Hongchan	365.40	1	369.84	1
2nd place, silver medalist(s)	Great Britain	Andrea Spendolini-Sirieix; Lois Toulson	293.22	3	311.76	2
3rd place, bronze medalist(s)	United States	Jessica Parratto; Delaney Schnell	294.12	2	294.42	3
4	Mexico	Gabriela Agúndez; Alejandra Orozco	290.70	5	291.18	4
5	Japan	Matsuri Arai; Minami Itahashi	289.32	6	284.76	5
6	Germany	Christina Wassen; Elena Wassen	273.06	7	283.08	6
7	Spain	Valeria Antolino; Ana Carvajal	259.83	9	280.38	7
8	Canada	Caeli McKay; Kate Miller	292.50	4	279.93	8
9	Ukraine	Kseniya Baylo; Sofia Esman	268.20	8	252.60	9
10	France	Jade Gillet; Emily Halifax	240.24	10	236.16	10
11	South Korea	Cho Eun-bi; Moon Na-yun	209.04	11	222.12	11
12	Macau	Lo Ka Wai; Zhao Hang U	183.87	12	160.38	12

== Paris 2024 Olympic qualification ==
The 10 metre synchronised platforms event was a direct qualification event for the diving program at the 2024 Olympic Games. The top three teams are awarded quota places for the women's 10 metre synchronised springboard event in Paris.

Qualification event	Qualified NOCs
Women's synchronized 10 metre platform	China
Women's synchronized 10 metre platform	Great Britain
Women's synchronized 10 metre platform	United States
Total	3 Quotas (6 Divers)
