= Diving at the 2023 World Aquatics Championships – Women's 10 metre platform =

Women's 10 metre platform at the 2023 World Aquatics Championships
- Venue: Fukuoka Prefectural Pool
- Location: Fukuoka, Japan
- Dates: 18 July (preliminary and semifinal); 19 July (final)
- Competitors: 36 from 24 nations
- Winning points: 457.85

Medalists
gold medal	Chen Yuxi	China
silver medal	Quan Hongchan	China
bronze medal	Caeli McKay	Canada

The women's 10 metre platform competition at the 2023 World Aquatics Championships was held on 18 and 19 July 2023.

== Results ==
The preliminary round was started on 18 July at 10:00. The semifinal was held on 18 July at 14:30. The final was held on 19 July at 11:00.

Green denotes finalists

Blue denotes semifinalists

Rank	Diver	Nationality	Preliminary		Semifinal		Final	
Rank	Diver	Nationality	Points	Rank	Points	Rank	Points	Rank
1st place, gold medalist(s)	Chen Yuxi	China	393.00	2	430.05	2	457.85	1
2nd place, silver medalist(s)	Quan Hongchan	China	435.60	1	451.40	1	445.60	2
3rd place, bronze medalist(s)	Caeli McKay	Canada	322.15	5	324.05	5	340.25	3
4	Gabriela Agúndez	Mexico	286.45	17	345.45	3	325.35	4
5	Lois Toulson	Great Britain	293.50	12	313.90	9	319.30	5
6	Delaney Schnell	United States	310.40	8	336.55	4	313.95	6
7	Alejandra Orozco	Mexico	318.30	6	315.50	6	313.40	7
8	Ana Carvajal	Spain	300.55	9	313.50	10	311.70	8
9	Christina Wassen	Germany	290.60	14	309.05	11	306.75	9
10	Elena Wassen	Germany	298.60	10	307.30	12	293.95	10
11	Matsuri Arai	Japan	314.10	7	313.95	7	288.85	11
12	Ingrid Oliveira	Brazil	298.50	11	313.90	8	272.00	12
13	Andrea Spendolini-Sirieix	Great Britain	353.90	3	305.20	13	Did not advance	
14	Valeria Antolino	Spain	292.30	13	292.50	14	Did not advance	
15	Nikita Hains	Australia	288.50	16	286.50	15	Did not advance	
16	Sarah Jodoin Di Maria	Italy	326.65	4	277.10	16	Did not advance	
17	Elaena Dick	Canada	283.90	18	271.50	17	Did not advance	
18	Maia Biginelli	Italy	289.75	15	247.30	18	Did not advance	
19	Else Praasterink	Netherlands	283.65	19	Did not advance			
20	Anisley García	Cuba	278.90	20	Did not advance			
21	Milly Puckeridge	Australia	267.90	21	Did not advance			
22	Nike Agunbiade	United States	264.15	22	Did not advance			
23	Moon Na-yun	South Korea	257.55	23	Did not advance			
24	Pandelela Rinong	Malaysia	256.40	24	Did not advance			
25	Nicoleta Muscalu	Romania	248.50	25	Did not advance			
26	Jade Gillet	France	247.50	26	Did not advance			
27	Džeja Patrika	Latvia	245.85	27	Did not advance			
28	Ciara McGing	Ireland	244.90	28	Did not advance			
29	Maycey Vieta	Puerto Rico	244.00	29	Did not advance			
30	Cho Eun-bi	South Korea	240.50	30	Did not advance			
31	Gladies Lariesa Garina Haga	Indonesia	237.45	31	Did not advance			
32	Mikali Dawson	New Zealand	228.75	32	Did not advance			
33	Helle Tuxen	Norway	222.05	33	Did not advance			
34	Elizabeth Miclau	Puerto Rico	207.60	34	Did not advance			
35	Nur Eilisha Rania Muhammad Abrar Raj	Malaysia	206.45	35	Did not advance			
36	Alisa Zakaryan	Armenia	145.95	36	Did not advance			
