= Diving at the 2026 Asian Games =

- Venue: Tokyo Aquatics Centre
- Dates: 26–30 September 2026
- Competitors: 66 from 14 nations

The diving competitions at the 2026 Asian Games was held between 26 and 30 September 2026 at the Tokyo Aquatics Centre. China dominated the competition with winning all 10 gold medals. Lian Junjie won China's 100th diving gold in history of Asian Games at the Men`s 10m platform event.

== Schedule ==
P	Preliminary	F	Final

Event↓/Date →	26th Sat	27th Sun	28th Mon	29th Tue		30th Wed	
Men's 1 m springboard			F				
Men's 3 m springboard				P	F		
Men's 10 m platform						P	F
Men's synchronized 3 m springboard	F						
Men's synchronized 10 m platform		F					
Women's 1 m springboard			F				
Women's 3 m springboard						P	F
Women's 10 m platform				P	F		
Women's synchronized 3 m springboard		F					
Women's synchronized 10 m platform	F						

== Medalists ==
=== Men ===
Event	Gold	Silver	Bronze
1 m springboard	Wang Zongyuan; China	Kim Yeong-nam; South Korea	Liu Chengzan; China
3 m springboard	Wang Zongyuan; China	Zheng Jiuyuan; China	Sho Sakai; Japan
10 m platform	Lian Junjie; China	Rikuto Tamai; Japan	Zhao Renjie; China
Synchronized 3 m springboard	China; Wang Zongyuan; Zheng Jiuyuan	Japan; Senri Ikuma; Haruki Suyama	Malaysia; Yong Rui Jie; Nurqayyum Nazmi Nazim
Synchronized 10 m platform	China; Yang Hao; Lian Junjie	Malaysia; Enrique Maccartney Harold; Elvis Priestly Clement	South Korea; Shin Jung-whi; Kim Yeong-taek

=== Women ===
Event	Gold	Silver	Bronze
1 m springboard	Lin Shan; China	Long Yiping; China	Kim Su-ji; South Korea
3 m springboard	Chen Yiwen; China	Chen Jia; China	Sayaka Mikami; Japan
10 m platform	Chen Yuxi; China	Lu Wei; China	Jo Jin-mi; North Korea
Synchronized 3 m springboard	China; Chen Yiwen; Chen Jia	South Korea; Kim Su-ji; Kim Na-hyun	Malaysia; Ong Ker Ying; Lee Yiat Qing
Synchronized 10 m platform	China; Chen Yuxi; Lu Wei	North Korea; Jo Jin-mi; Kim Mi-rae	South Korea; Kim Na-hyun; Moon Na-yun

== Medal table ==
Rank	Nation	Gold	Silver	Bronze	Total
1	China (CHN)	10	4	2	16
2	South Korea (KOR)	0	2	3	5
3	Japan (JPN)	0	2	2	4
4	Malaysia (MAS)	0	1	2	3
5	North Korea (PRK)	0	1	1	2
Totals (5 entries)		10	10	10	30

== Participating nations ==
A total of 66 athletes from 14 nations competed in diving at the 2026 Asian Games:

- China (12)
- Chinese Taipei (2)
- Hong Kong (4)
- Iran (2)
- Japan (9)
- Kazakhstan (2)
- Macau (2)
- Malaysia (10)
- North Korea (3)
- Singapore (5)
- South Korea (8)
- Sri Lanka (1)
- Thailand (2)
- Uzbekistan (4)
