= Diving at the 2024 Summer Olympics =

Diving at the Games of the XXXIII Olympiad
- Venue: Paris Aquatic Centre
- Dates: 27 July – 10 August 2024
- No. of events: 8 (4 men, 4 women)
- Competitors: 136 from 32 nations

The diving competitions at the 2024 Summer Olympics in Paris were held from 27 July to 10 August 2024 at the Paris Aquatics Centre. A total of 136 divers, with an equal distribution between men and women, competed across eight medal events (four per gender in both individual and synchronized) at these Games, the same amount as Tokyo 2020.

For the first time, Chinese divers swept all of the available events, winning a record eight gold medals. Great Britain won no golds for the first time since 2016, but won a national record of five medals, being the only team other than China to win more than two, and finished in second place in the table for the third successive Games. Outside of China and Great Britain, six nations shared the remaining eight medals.

== Qualification ==
136 diving quota places, with an equal split between men and women, were available for Paris 2024; NOCs could enter a maximum of two divers each in the men's and women's individual events and a gender-based pair in the synchronized events, respecting a sixteen-member (eight per gender) country limit. To be eligible for the Games, all divers had to be 14 years old and above on or before December 31, 2023; and had to have participated in various international meets approved by World Aquatics.

=== Individual events ===
The qualification spots for each of the individual springboard and platform diving events (both men and women) had been attributed as follows:

- 2023 World Championships – The top twelve finalists of each individual event obtained a quota place for their NOC at the 2023 World Aquatics Championships, scheduled for July 14 to 30, in Fukuoka, Japan.
- Continental Qualification Tournaments – The winners of each individual event obtained a quota place for their NOC at one of the five continental meets (Africa, the Americas, Asia, Europe, and Oceania) approved by World Aquatics.
- 2024 World Championships – Twelve highest-ranked divers eligible for qualification obtained a quota place for their NOC in each individual event at the 2024 World Aquatics Championships, scheduled for February 2 to 18, in Doha, Qatar, respecting the two-member country limit and without surpassing the total quota of 136.
- Reallocation – Additional spots had been entitled to the eligible divers placed thirteenth and above in their corresponding individual events, respecting the two-member country limit, at the 2024 World Aquatics Championships until they attained the total quota of 136.
- Host nation – As the host country, France reserved four men's and four women's spots to be distributed in each of the individual diving events.

=== Synchronized events ===
Each synchronized diving event featured eight teams from their respective NOCs, composed of the following:

- 3: the top three (or the medal-winning) pairs at the 2023 World Aquatics Championships, from July 14 to 30, in Fukuoka, Japan
- 4: the top four pairs vying for qualification at the 2024 World Aquatics Championships, from February 2 to 18, in Doha, Qatar
- 1: reserved for the host country France

== Competition schedule ==
Legend
P	Preliminary round	½	Semi-finals	F	Final

Schedule
Event ↓ / Date →	Sat 27	Mon 29	Wed 31	Fri 2	Mon 5		Tue 6	Wed 7	Thu 8	Fri 9	Sat 10	
Men's
Men's 3 m springboard							P	½	F			
Men's 10 m platform										P	½	F
Men's 3 m synchronized springboard				F								
Men's 10 m synchronized platform		F										
Women's
Women's 3 m springboard								P	½	F		
Women's 10 m platform					P	½	F					
Women's 3 m synchronized springboard	F											
Women's 10 m synchronized platform			F									

== Participating nations ==
136 divers from 32 NOCs qualified.

- Australia (9)
- Austria (1)
- Brazil (2)
- Canada (5)
- China (10)
- Colombia (3)
- Cuba (2)
- Dominican Republic (3)
- Egypt (4)
- France (9) Host
- Germany (9)
- Great Britain (11)
- Ireland (2)
- Italy (8)
- Jamaica (1)
- Japan (5)
- Latvia (1)
- Malaysia (2)
- Mexico (9)
- Netherlands (1)
- New Zealand (1)
- North Korea (3)
- Norway (1)
- Poland (1)
- Puerto Rico (1)
- South Africa (1)
- South Korea (6)
- Spain (4)
- Sweden (1)
- Ukraine (9)
- United States (11)
- Uzbekistan (1)

== Medal summary ==
=== Medal table ===
* Host nation (France)

Rank	NOC	Gold	Silver	Bronze	Total
1	China	8	2	1	11
2	Great Britain	0	1	4	5
3	Mexico	0	1	1	2
3	North Korea	0	1	1	2
5	Australia	0	1	0	1
5	Japan	0	1	0	1
5	United States	0	1	0	1
8	Canada	0	0	1	1
Totals (8 entries)		8	8	8	24

=== Men's events ===
Event	Gold	Silver	Bronze
3 m springboard	Xie Siyi; China	Wang Zongyuan; China	Osmar Olvera; Mexico
10 m platform	Cao Yuan; China	Rikuto Tamai; Japan	Noah Williams; Great Britain
Synchronized 3 m springboard	China; Wang Zongyuan; Long Daoyi	Mexico; Juan Celaya; Osmar Olvera	Great Britain; Anthony Harding; Jack Laugher
Synchronized 10 m platform	China; Yang Hao; Lian Junjie	Great Britain; Tom Daley; Noah Williams	Canada; Rylan Wiens; Nathan Zsombor-Murray

=== Women's events ===
Event	Gold	Silver	Bronze
3 m springboard	Chen Yiwen; China	Maddison Keeney; Australia	Chang Yani; China
10 m platform	Quan Hongchan; China	Chen Yuxi; China	Kim Mi-rae; North Korea
Synchronized 3 m springboard	China; Chen Yiwen; Chang Yani	United States; Sarah Bacon; Kassidy Cook	Great Britain; Yasmin Harper; Scarlett Mew Jensen
Synchronized 10 m platform	China; Chen Yuxi; Quan Hongchan	North Korea; Kim Mi-rae; Jo Jin-mi	Great Britain; Andrea Spendolini-Sirieix; Lois Toulson

== See also ==
- Diving at the 2022 Asian Games
- Diving at the 2022 Commonwealth Games
- Diving at the 2023 European Games
- Diving at the 2023 Pan American Games
