= Diving at the 2024 World Aquatics Championships – Women's synchronized 10 metre platform =

Women's synchronized 10 metre platform at the 2024 World Aquatics Championships
- Venue: Hamad Aquatic Centre
- Location: Doha, Qatar
- Dates: 6 February
- Competitors: 32 from 16 nations
- Teams: 16
- Winning points: 362.22

Medalists
gold medal	Chen Yuxi; Quan Hongchan	China
silver medal	Jo Jin-mi; Kim Mi-rae	North Korea
bronze medal	Andrea Spendolini-Sirieix; Lois Toulson	Great Britain

The Women's synchronized 10 metre platform competition at the 2024 World Aquatics Championships was held on 6 February 2024.

== Results ==
The final was started at 18:32.

Rank	Nation	Divers	Points
1st place, gold medalist(s)	China	Chen Yuxi; Quan Hongchan	362.22
2nd place, silver medalist(s)	North Korea	Jo Jin-mi; Kim Mi-rae	320.70
3rd place, bronze medalist(s)	Great Britain	Andrea Spendolini-Sirieix; Lois Toulson	299.34
4	Mexico	Gabriela Agúndez; Alejandra Orozco	296.34
5	Ukraine	Kseniya Baylo; Sofiya Lyskun	292.50
6	Canada	Caeli McKay; Kate Miller	287.34
7	Germany	Christina Wassen; Elena Wassen	277.98
8	United States	Jessica Parratto; Delaney Schnell	271.26
9	Japan	Matsuri Arai; Minami Itahashi	270.90
10	Australia	Nikita Hains; Melissa Wu	266.58
11	South Korea	Kim Na-hyun; Kwon Ha-lim	240.36
12	Malaysia	Pandelela Rinong; Nur Dhabitah Sabri	240.06
13	Spain	Valeria Antolino; Ana Carvajal	237.24
14	France	Jade Gillet; Emily Halifax	231.60
15	Puerto Rico	Lauren Burch; Elizabeth Miclau	224.28
16	Macau	Lo Ka Wai; Zhao Hang U	155.88
