= North Korea at the 2026 Asian Games =

- IOC code: PRK
- NOC: Olympic Committee of the Democratic People's Republic of Korea

in Aichi–Nagoya, Japan 19 September – 4 October 2026
- Competitors: 107 (42 men & 65 women) in 14 sports
- Medals Ranked 12th: Gold 7 Silver 13 Bronze 9 Total 29

Asian Games appearances (overview)
- 1974; 1978; 1982; 1986; 1990; 1994; 1998; 2002; 2006; 2010; 2014; 2018; 2022; 2026

North Korea is scheduled to compete at the 2026 Asian Games in Aichi Prefecture and Nagoya, Japan from 19 September to 4 October 2026.

== Background ==
North Korea was expected to send a smaller delegation for the 2026 Asian Games in Japan. In the 2022 Asian Games, which was held in September 2023 due to the COVID-19 pandemic, North Korea sent 185 athletes across 18 sports. They are expected to send around 100 athletes across 14 sports for the event in Aichi and Nagoya.

While Japan has banned the entry of North Korean citizens in principle, the government has waived this ban for sporting reasons and is expected to do the same for the 2026 Asian Games. Including officials, the whole North Korean delegation is expected to consist of around 180 people.

== Medalists ==
The following North Korean competitors won medals at the Games.

=== Gold ===
No.	Medal	Name	Sport	Event	Date
1	Gold	Ri Song-gum	Weightlifting	Women's 49 kg	23 September
2	Gold	Kang Hyon-gyong	Weightlifting	Women's 53 kg	23 September
3	Gold	Pak Myong-jin	Weightlifting	Men's 65 kg	24 September
4	Gold	Oh Kwang-ok	Weightlifting	Women's 57 kg	25 September
5	Gold	Ri Won-ju	Weightlifting	Men's 70 kg	26 September
6	Gold	Song Kuk-hyang	Weightlifting	Women's 69 kg	27 September
7	Gold	Ro Kwang-ryol	Weightlifting	Men's 85 kg	28 September

=== Silver ===
No.	Medal	Name	Sport	Event	Date
1	Silver	Ri Jin-mi	Soft tennis	Women's singles	23 September
2	Silver	Pang Un-chol	Weightlifting	Men's 60 kg	24 September
3	Silver	Pak Jin-hae	Weightlifting	Women's 61 kg	24 September
4	Silver	An Chang-ok	Gymnastics	Women's vault	24 September
5	Silver	Jo Jin-mi; Kim Mi-rae	Diving	Women's synchronized 10 metre platform	26 September
6	Silver	Kim Ji-hye	Judo	Women's 63 kg	1 October
7	Silver	Kim Ok-ju	Wrestling	Women's freestyle 62 kg	1 October
8	Silver	Pak Sol-gum	Wrestling	Women's freestyle 68 kg	1 October
9	Silver	Pang Chol-mi	Boxing	Women's 54 kg	2 October
10	Silver	Kim Son-hyang	Wrestling	Women's freestyle 50 kg	2 October
11	Silver	North Korea women's national football team	Football	Women's tournament	2 October

=== Bronze ===
No.	Medal	Name	Sport	Event	Date
1	Bronze	Ri So-hyang	Soft tennis	Women's singles	23 September
2	Bronze	Cha Su-yong; Choe Jong-im; Kim Kum Yong; Pyon Song-gyong	Table tennis	Women's team	23 September
3	Bronze	An Chang-ok; Han Yon-mi; Jo Kyong-byol; Kim Kyong-ryong; Pak Un-jong	Gymnastics	Women's artistic team all-around	23 September
4	Bronze	Ri Chong-song	Weightlifting	Men's 75 kg	27 September
5	Bronze	Kim Hyon-suk	Shooting	Women's 25 metre pistol	28 September
6	Bronze	Hwang Hyo-sun	Boxing	Women's 65 kg	29 September
7	Bronze	Jo Jin-mi	Diving	Women's 10 metre platform	29 September
8	Bronze	Kim Hyon-a	Judo	Women's 57 kg	1 October
9	Bronze	Mun Song-hui	Judo	Women's 70 kg	1 October

== Medal summary ==
=== Medals by sports ===
Sport	1st place, gold medalist(s)	2nd place, silver medalist(s)	3rd place, bronze medalist(s)	Total
Weightlifting	7	2	1	10
Wrestling	0	5	0	5
Judo	0	1	2	3
Soft tennis	0	1	1	2
Gymnastics	0	1	1	2
Diving	0	1	1	2
Boxing	0	1	1	2
Football	0	1	0	1
Shooting	0	0	1	1
Table tennis	0	0	1	1
Total	7	13	9	29

=== Medals by Date ===
Day	Date	1st place, gold medalist(s)	2nd place, silver medalist(s)	3rd place, bronze medalist(s)	Total
1	20 September	0	0	0	0
2	21 September	0	0	0	0
3	22 September	0	0	0	0
4	23 September	2	1	3	6
5	24 September	1	1	0	2
6	25 September	1	0	0	1
7	26 September	1	1	1	3
8	27 September	1	0	0	1
9	28 September	1	0	0	1
10	29 September				
11	30 September				
12	1 October				
13	2 October				
14	3 October				
15	4 October				
Total		6	5	4	15

== Competitors ==
The following is a list of the number of competitors representing North Korea that will participate at the Asian Games:

Sport	Men	Women	Total
Diving	0	3	3
Athletics	3	2	5
Badminton	0	2	2
Boxing	2	4	6
Canoeing	0	3	3
Football	23	23	46
Gymnastics	0	5	5
Judo	1	3	4
Karate	0	1	1
Shooting	3	3	6
Table tennis	2	4	6
Soft tennis	0	2	2
Weightlifting	5	5	10
Wrestling	4	5	9
Total	42	65	107

== Boxing ==
=== Men ===
Athlete	Event	Round of 32	Round of 16	Quarterfinals	Semifinals	Final	Rank
Athlete	Event	Opposition Result	Opposition Result	Opposition Result	Opposition Result	Opposition Result	Rank
So Chon-ryong	55 kg	Kazemi (IRI); L 1–4	Did not advance				
O Tae-bom	60 kg	Majrashi (KSA); W 5–0	Khalokov (UZB); L 0–5	Did not advance			

=== Women ===
Athlete	Event	Round of 32	Round of 16	Quarterfinals	Semifinals	Final	Rank
Athlete	Event	Opposition Result	Opposition Result	Opposition Result	Opposition Result	Opposition Result	Rank
An Kum-byol	51 kg	Bye	Nassar (JOR); W 5–0	Uktamova (UZB) –			
Pang Chol-mi	54 kg	Maharani (INA); W RSC	Pawar (IND) –				
Won Un-gyong	60 kg	—N/a	Muthuthanthri Patabandige (SRI) –				
Hwang Hyo-sun	65 kg	—N/a	Kito (JPN); W 5–0	Naghsh (IRI) –			

== Football ==
The North Korea men's under-23 and women's senior national teams will take part in the football tournaments of the 2026 Asian Games.

Summary

Key:

- A.E.T – After extra time.
- P – Match decided by penalty-shootout.

Team	Event	Group Stage				Quarterfinals	Semifinals	Final / BM	
Team	Event	Opposition Score	Opposition Score	Opposition Score	Rank	Opposition Score	Opposition Score	Opposition Score	Rank
North Korea men's under-23	Men's tournament	China; L 1–2	United Arab Emirates; D 0–0	Iran; W 4–1	2 Q	Japan –			
North Korea women's	Women's tournament	Bangladesh; W 10–0	Myanmar; W 8–0	South Korea; D 1–1	1 Q	Chinese Taipei; W 5–1	China		

=== Men's tournament ===
Team squads

North Korea announced their final squad on 5 September.

Head coach: Ri Kwang-chon

No.	Pos.	Player	Date of birth (age)	Caps	Goals	Club
1	GK	Kang Ju-hyok* (captain)	31 May 1997 (age 29)	24	0	(DPR Korea Football Association) Hwaebul
2	DF	Jong Ye-won	28 October 2003 (age 22)	0	0	(DPR Korea Football Association) Kigwancha
3	DF	Kim Kum-chon	10 March 2003 (age 23)	3	0	(DPR Korea Football Association) Amnokgang
4	DF	Ri Song-hung	22 February 2005 (age 21)	0	0	(DPR Korea Football Association) Ryomyong
5	DF	Jong Hwi-nam	15 May 2003 (age 23)	3	0	(DPR Korea Football Association) Ryomyong
6	DF	Han Jae-yong	15 January 2006 (age 20)	3	0	(DPR Korea Football Association) Amnokgang
7	MF	Ri Kum-chol	26 March 2004 (age 22)	0	0	(DPR Korea Football Association) Ryomyong
8	MF	Pak Hyok-song	10 January 2004 (age 22)	0	0	(DPR Korea Football Association) Kyonggongopsong
9	FW	Ho Chol-myong	9 January 2003 (age 23)	1	0	(DPR Korea Football Association) Pyongyang
10	MF	Ri Il-song	14 January 2004 (age 22)	8	1	(DPR Korea Football Association) Ryomyong
11	MF	Yom Chol-gyong	9 August 2004 (age 22)	0	0	(DPR Korea Football Association) Ryomyong
12	DF	Choe Ryong-il	23 March 2004 (age 22)	3	0	(DPR Korea Football Association) Ryomyong
14	MF	Ryang Kwang-myong	26 January 2003 (age 23)	3	1	(DPR Korea Football Association) Amnokgang
15	MF	Ra Myong-song	6 January 2003 (age 23)	3	0	(DPR Korea Football Association) Amnokgang
16	DF	Kim Yu-song	18 July 2003 (age 23)	8	1	(DPR Korea Football Association) Amnokgang
17	FW	Choe Kuk	21 March 2005 (age 21)	3	1	(DPR Korea Football Association) Wolmido
18	GK	Kim Ryong-ik	13 March 2003 (age 23)	3	0	(DPR Korea Football Association) Sobaeksu
19	DF	Hong Kwon-hwi	2 March 2003 (age 23)	0	0	(DPR Korea Football Association) Kyonggongopsong
20	FW	Paek Chung-song*	25 February 2000 (age 26)	5	0	(DPR Korea Football Association) Ryomyong
21	GK	Hong Tae-han	30 January 2005 (age 21)	0	0	(DPR Korea Football Association) Ryomyong
22	MF	Kim Kuk-bom*	19 February 1995 (age 31)	21	3	(DPR Korea Football Association) April 25
23	MF	An Kyong-ung	22 February 2004 (age 22)	3	2	(DPR Korea Football Association) Wolmido

* Over-aged player.

Preliminary Rounds – Group B

Pos	Team	Pld	W	D	L	GF	GA	GD	Pts	Qualification
1	China	3	1	2	0	2	1	+1	5	Advance to knockout stage
2	North Korea	3	1	1	1	5	3	+2	4	Advance to knockout stage
3	Iran	3	1	1	1	4	5	−1	4	
4	United Arab Emirates	3	0	2	1	1	3	−2	2	

Source: Aichi–Nagoya 26
16 September 2026
19:00

China	2–1	North Korea
Zhang Yuning 44'; Wu Xi 68'	Report	Choe Kuk 27'

Wave Stadium Kariya, Kariya
Attendance: 1,185
Referee: Meder Taichiev (Kyrgyzstan)

20 September 2026
19:00

North Korea	0–0	United Arab Emirates
	Report

Wave Stadium Kariya, Kariya
Attendance: 1,139
Referee: Adam Kersey (Australia)

23 September 2026
14:30

Iran	1–4	North Korea
Hosseinzadeh 17'	Report	Choe Kuk 41'; Ra Myong-song 44', 51'; Paek Chung-song 68'

Wave Stadium Kariya, Kariya
Attendance: 1,007
Referee: Sadullo Gulmurodi (Tajikistan)

=== Women's tournament ===
Team roster

The following players list is the North Korea squad for the 2026 Asian Games.

Head Coach: Pak Song-jin

No.	Pos.	Player	Date of birth (age)	Caps	Goals	Club
1	GK	Pak Ju-mi	1 July 2003 (age 23)	8	0	(DPR Korea Football Association) Naegohyang
2	DF	Ri Myong-gum	1 January 2003 (age 23)	21	2	(DPR Korea Football Association) Naegohyang
3	DF	Ri Kum-hyang	22 April 2001 (age 25)	16	2	(DPR Korea Football Association) Naegohyang
4	DF	Oh Sol-song	30 June 2004 (age 22)	0	0	(DPR Korea Football Association) Sobaeksu
5	DF	An Kuk-hyang (captain)	25 May 2001 (age 25)	11	0	(DPR Korea Football Association) April 25
6	MF	An Pok-yong	10 January 2002 (age 24)	5	0	(DPR Korea Football Association) Naegohyang
7	MF	Myong Yu-jong	29 August 2003 (age 23)	25	15	(DPR Korea Football Association) April 25
8	FW	Ri Song-a	22 June 1999 (age 27)	3	0	(Japan Football Association) Sanfrecce Hiroshima Regina
9	MF	Kim Song-gyong	12 February 2005 (age 21)	11	3	(DPR Korea Football Association) Amnokgang
10	FW	Jong Kum	1 June 2004 (age 22)	0	0	(DPR Korea Football Association) Naegohyang
11	FW	Han Jin-hong	16 February 2002 (age 24)	18	9	(DPR Korea Football Association) April 25
12	MF	Hong Song-ok	21 August 2003 (age 23)	25	12	(DPR Korea Football Association) Amnokgang
13	MF	Jon Ryong-jong	25 July 2004 (age 22)	6	0	(DPR Korea Football Association) April 25
14	DF	Hwang Yu-yong	13 April 2006 (age 20)	9	0	(DPR Korea Football Association) Amnokgang
15	FW	Choe Il-son	1 January 2007 (age 19)	4	0	(DPR Korea Football Association) April 25
16	DF	Song Chun-sim	29 May 2002 (age 24)	9	3	(DPR Korea Football Association) Pyongyang
17	FW	Kim Kyong-yong	2 January 2002 (age 24)	23	30	(DPR Korea Football Association) Naegohyang
18	GK	Yu Son-gum	8 November 2003 (age 22)	14	0	(DPR Korea Football Association) Sobaeksu
19	MF	Choe Kum-ok	23 February 2002 (age 24)	4	0	(DPR Korea Football Association) Naegohyang
20	MF	Chae Un-yong	12 April 2004 (age 22)	9	3	(DPR Korea Football Association) Wolmido
21	GK	Chae Un-gyong	29 November 2004 (age 21)	0	0	(DPR Korea Football Association) Pyongyang
22	MF	Kim Hye-yong	11 March 2003 (age 23)	15	9	(DPR Korea Football Association) Naegohyang
23	DF	Ri Hye-gyong	24 September 1999 (age 27)	24	1	(DPR Korea Football Association) Amnokgang

Preliminary Rounds – Group F

Pos	Team	Pld	W	D	L	GF	GA	GD	Pts	Qualification
1	North Korea	3	2	1	0	19	1	+18	7	Advance to knockout stage
2	South Korea	3	2	1	0	12	1	+11	7	Advance to knockout stage
3	Myanmar	3	0	1	2	0	13	−13	1	
4	Bangladesh	3	0	1	2	0	16	−16	1	

Source: Aichi–Nagoya 26
14 September 2026
16:00

North Korea	10–0	Bangladesh
Jon Ryong-jong 5', 10'; Hwang Yu-yong 12'; Chae Un-yong 18', 35'; Kim Kyong-yong 40', 43'; Ri Song-a 51'; Jong Kum 60'; Han Jin-hong 90'	Report

Nagai Stadium, Osaka
Attendance: 1,343
Referee: Plong Pich Akara (Cambodia)

17 September 2026
19:30

Myanmar	0–8	North Korea
	Report	Ri Myong-gum 10'; Ri Song-a 18' (pen.); Khin Marlar Tun 37' (o.g.); Jon Ryong-jong 40', 42'; Choe Kum-ok 58', 77'; Jong Kum 66'

Nagai Stadium, Osaka
Attendance: 885
Referee: Mu Mingxin (China)

21 September 2026
16:00

South Korea	1–1	North Korea
Yoon Su-jeong 46'	Report	Chae Un-yong 35'

Shizuoka Stadium, Fukuroi
Attendance: 2,032
Referee: Supiree Testhomya (Thailand)

== Table tennis ==
Men

Athlete	Event	Round of 64	Round of 32	Round of 16	Quarterfinal	Semifinal	Final / BM	
Athlete	Event	Opposition Result	Opposition Result	Opposition Result	Opposition Result	Opposition Result	Opposition Result	Rank
Ri Jong-sik	Singles	Dilshodov (UZB); W 4–0	An J-h (KOR); W 4–2	Chan (HKG); L 1–4	Did not advance			
U Tae-ryong	Singles	Tologonov (MDV); W 4–0	Thakkar (IND); W 4–1	Wang (CHN); L 0–4	Did not advance			
Ri Jong-sik; U Tae-ryong	Doubles	Desrizal / Inzaghi (INA); W 3–0	Park G-h / Jang W-j (KOR); W 3–0	Xiang / Wen (CHN); L 1–3	Did not advance			

Women

Athlete	Event	Round of 64	Round of 32	Round of 16	Quarterfinal	Semifinal	Final / BM	
Athlete	Event	Opposition Result	Opposition Result	Opposition Result	Opposition Result	Opposition Result	Opposition Result	Rank
Kim Kum-yong	Singles	Ali (MDV); W 4–0	Cheng I-c (TPE); W 4–3	Ser (SGP); W 4–0	Harimoto (JPN); L 0–4	Did not advance		
Pyon Song-gyong	Singles	Mirkadirova (KAZ); W 4–1	Akula (IND); W 4–1	Zhu (MAC); L 3–4	Did not advance			
Cha Su-yong; Kim Kum-yong	Doubles	Tushi / Mahi (BAN); W 3–0	Chen / Fan (CHN); L 1–3	Did not advance				
Choe Jong-im; Pyon Song-gyong	Doubles	F. Khan / A. Khan (PAK); W 3–0	Yeh Y-t / Cheng I-c (TPE); L 1–3	Did not advance				

Mixed

Athlete	Event	Round of 32	Round of 16	Quarterfinal	Semifinal	Final / BM	
Athlete	Event	Opposition Result	Opposition Result	Opposition Result	Opposition Result	Opposition Result	Rank
Kim Kum-yong; Ri Jong-sik	Doubles	Lin SD / Kuai M (CHN); L 0–3	Did not advance				
Pyon Song-gyong; U Tae-ryong	Doubles	Matsushima / Harimoto (JPN); L 2–3	Did not advance				

Team

Athlete	Event	Group stage			Quarterfinal	Semifinal	Final	
Athlete	Event	Opposition Score	Opposition Score	Rank	Opposition Score	Opposition Score	Opposition Score	Rank
Cha Sung-yong; Choe Jong-im; Kim Kum-yong; Pyong Song-gyong	Women's	Chinese Taipei; W 3–1	Bangladesh; W 3–0	1 Q	India; W 3–0	China; L 0–3	Did not advance	3rd place, bronze medalist(s)

== Wrestling ==
North Korea will send nine wrestlers for the 2026 Asian Games.
