= Diving at the 2024 Summer Olympics – Women's synchronized 10 metre platform =

Women's synchronized 10 metre platform at the Games of the XXXIII Olympiad
- Venue: Paris Aquatics Centre
- Date: 31 July 2024
- Competitors: 16 from 8 nations

Medalists
1st place, gold medalist(s)		Chen Yuxi; Quan Hongchan	China
2nd place, silver medalist(s)		Kim Mi-rae; Jo Jin-mi	North Korea
3rd place, bronze medalist(s)		Andrea Spendolini-Sirieix; Lois Toulson	Great Britain

The women's 10 metre synchronised platform diving competitions at the 2024 Summer Olympics in Paris took place on 31 July 2024 at the Paris Aquatics Centre. It was the 7th appearance of the event, which has been held at every Olympic Games since the 2000 Summer Olympics.

== Competition format ==
The competition was held in a single round, consisting of each pair performing five dives. Each dive was from a different group (forward, back, reverse, inward, and twisting). The first two dives were given a fixed degree of difficulty of 2.0, regardless of the dive performed. The other three dives were assigned a degree of difficulty based on somersaults, position, twists, approach, and entry. There was no limit to the degree of difficulty of dives; the most difficult dives calculated in the FINA rulebook (reverse 4 1/2 somersault in pike position and back 4 1/2 somersault in pike position) was 4.7, but competitors could attempt more difficult dives. Scoring was done by a panel of eleven judges, with five judges evaluating synchronization and three judges evaluating execution of each individual diver. For each dive, each judge gave a score between 0 and 10 with 0.5 point increments. The top and bottom synchronization scores and the top and bottom execution scores for each diver were discarded. The remaining five scores were summed, multiplied by 3/5, and multiplied by the degree of difficulty to give a dive score. The five dive scores were summed to give the score for the round.

== Schedule ==
All times are Central European time (UTC+1)

Date	Time	Round
31 July 2024	11:00	Final

== Qualification ==
The top 3 teams at the 2023 World Aquatics Championships earned a quota spot for their NOC. France as the host country, was guaranteed a quota spot. The next 4 teams at the 2024 World Aquatics Championships also received a quota spot.

== Results ==
Rank	Divers	Nation	Final					
Rank	Divers	Nation	Dive 1	Dive 2	Dive 3	Dive 4	Dive 5	Points
1st place, gold medalist(s)	Chen Yuxi; Quan Hongchan	China	56.40	54.60	80.10	85.44	82.56	359.10
2nd place, silver medalist(s)	Kim Mi-rae; Jo Jin-mi	North Korea	46.80	46.20	69.30	75.84	77.76	315.90
3rd place, bronze medalist(s)	Andrea Spendolini-Sirieix; Lois Toulson	Great Britain	48.60	48.60	60.30	69.12	77.76	304.38
4	Caeli McKay; Kate Miller	Canada	49.20	44.40	69.30	68.16	68.16	299.22
5	Gabriela Agúndez; Alejandra Orozco	Mexico	47.40	47.40	67.50	62.40	72.96	297.66
6	Delaney Schnell; Jessica Parratto	United States	46.20	43.80	61.20	70.08	66.24	287.52
7	Kseniya Baylo; Sofiya Lyskun	Ukraine	48.00	48.00	59.64	68.16	61.20	285.00
8	Jade Gillet; Emily Hallifax	France	47.40	45.00	53.76	37.80	50.88	234.84
