= Diving at the 2025 World Aquatics Championships – Women's synchronized 10 metre platform =

Women's synchronized 10 metre platform at the Diving at the 2025 World Aquatics Championships
- Venue: OCBC Aquatic Centre
- Location: Singapore
- Dates: 28 July (preliminaries and final)
- Competitors: 28 from 14 nations
- Teams: 14
- Winning points: 349.26

Medalists
gold medal	Chen Yuxi; Zhang Minjie	China
silver medal	Gabriela Agúndez; Alejandra Estudillo	Mexico
bronze medal	Jo Jin-mi; Kim Mi-hwa	North Korea

The Women's synchronized 10 metre platform competition at the 2025 World Aquatics Championships was held on 28 July 2025.

== Results ==
The preliminary round was started at 13:32. The final round was started at 18:02.

Green denotes finalists

Rank	Nation	Preliminary		Final	
Rank	Nation	Points	Rank	Points	Rank
1st place, gold medalist(s)	China; Chen Yuxi; Zhang Minjie	331.08	1	349.26	1
2nd place, silver medalist(s)	Mexico; Gabriela Agúndez; Alejandra Estudillo	284.58	4	304.80	2
3rd place, bronze medalist(s)	North Korea; Jo Jin-mi; Kim Mi-hwa	308.46	2	293.34	3
4	Australia; Ellie Cole; Milly Puckeridge	284.04	5	283.62	4
5	Great Britain; Maisie Bond; Lois Toulson	285.54	3	282.54	5
6	United States; Bayleigh Cranford; Daryn Wright	279.75	7	274.41	6
7	Neutral Athletes B Aleksandra Kedrina; Anna Konanykhina	280.62	6	269.46	7
8	Canada; Katelyn Fung; Kate Miller	277.77	8	269.34	8
9	South Korea; Ko Hyeon-ju; Moon Na-yun	270.60	9	Did not advance	
10	Ukraine; Kseniya Baylo; Sofiya Lyskun	270.00	10	Did not advance	
11	Spain; Valeria Antolino; Ana Carvajal	260.70	11	Did not advance	
12	Germany; Carolina Coordes; Pauline Pfeif	253.68	12	Did not advance	
13	Brazil; Ingrid Oliveira; Giovanna Pedroso	249.84	13	Did not advance	
	Malaysia; Lee Yiat Qing; Pandelela Rinong	WD		Did not advance	
