= Diving at the 2022 Asian Games – Women's 10 metre platform =

Diving competition

Women's 10 metre platform at the 2022 Asian Games
- Venue: Hangzhou Olympic Expo Aquatics Center
- Date: 3 October 2023
- Competitors: 8 from 6 nations

Medalists
gold medal	Quan Hongchan	China
silver medal	Chen Yuxi	China
bronze medal	Pandelela Rinong	Malaysia

The women's 10 metre platform competition at the 2022 Asian Games took place on 3 October 2023 at Hangzhou Olympic Expo Center.

== Schedule ==
All times are China Standard Time (UTC+08:00)

Date	Time	Event
Tuesday, 3 October 2023	10:00	Preliminary
Tuesday, 3 October 2023	17:30	Final

== Results ==
=== Preliminary ===
Rank	Athlete	Dive					Total
Rank	Athlete	1	2	3	4	5	Total
1	Quan Hongchan (CHN)	82.50	88.00	75.20	94.05	78.40	418.15
2	Chen Yuxi (CHN)	76.50	81.60	80.85	89.10	78.40	406.45
3	Matsuri Arai (JPN)	53.20	63.00	60.90	54.60	59.20	290.90
4	Cho Eun-bi (KOR)	57.40	48.00	52.20	57.40	56.55	271.55
5	Moon Na-yun (KOR)	53.20	58.00	39.20	54.00	57.60	262.00
6	Pandelela Rinong (MAS)	37.50	59.45	49.60	52.80	40.00	239.35
7	Yelizaveta Darovskaya (KAZ)	44.85	42.00	40.80	37.70	35.10	200.45
8	Lo Ka Wai (MAC)	24.30	25.65	30.00	27.60	36.00	143.55

=== Final ===
Rank	Athlete	Dive					Total
Rank	Athlete	1	2	3	4	5	Total
1st place, gold medalist(s)	Quan Hongchan (CHN)	85.50	96.00	86.40	75.90	94.40	438.20
2nd place, silver medalist(s)	Chen Yuxi (CHN)	79.50	80.00	95.70	94.05	86.40	435.65
3rd place, bronze medalist(s)	Pandelela Rinong (MAS)	57.00	66.70	48.00	60.80	48.00	280.50
4	Matsuri Arai (JPN)	63.00	57.00	60.90	50.40	48.00	279.30
5	Moon Na-yun (KOR)	54.60	47.85	46.20	52.50	57.60	258.75
6	Cho Eun-bi (KOR)	50.40	54.00	52.20	40.60	58.00	255.20
7	Yelizaveta Darovskaya (KAZ)	44.85	42.00	36.00	39.00	23.40	185.25
8	Lo Ka Wai (MAC)	29.70	30.40	30.00	27.60	30.00	147.70
