= 2026 Quan Hongchan cyberbullying incident =

Online harassment campaign

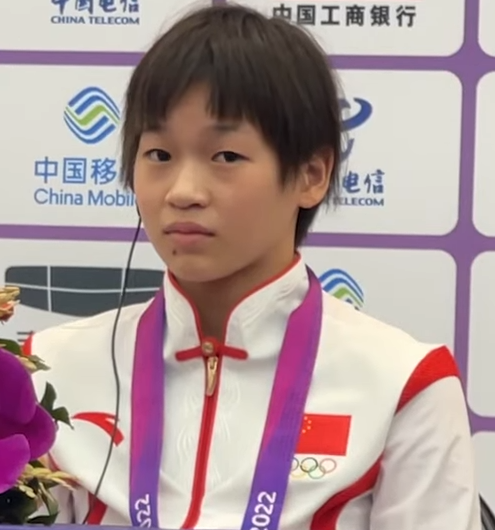
Quan Hongchan

Beginning in late March 2026, a series of incidents described as organized online harassment targeted Chinese Olympic diver Quan Hongchan. The controversy came to light after Quan gave an interview to the Chinese magazine Renwu (人物), where she became emotional and appealed for the public to stop verbally abusing her family and friends.

Following the interview, screenshots circulated online of a private WeChat group titled "Splash Conquerors Alliance" (水花征服者联盟). The screenshots allegedly showed sustained personal attacks and derogatory remarks directed at Quan. The incident attracted widespread attention, particularly due to claims that some participants in the group were connected to China's sports community. The incident prompted public debate about online harassment, workplace bullying and the influence of fan culture in Chinese sports.

== Background ==
Quan Hongchan rose to prominence at the age of 14 after winning a gold medal in diving at the 2020 Summer Olympics in Tokyo, Japan. She later won two additional gold medals at the 2024 Summer Olympics in Paris, France, becoming one of the youngest athletes to win three Olympic gold medals.

Observers have noted that during the 2020s, elements of "fan circle culture", a phenomenon associated with highly organized and sometimes extreme fan behavior, have increasingly influenced Chinese sports. This has included online harassment, rumor spreading and intrusive attention toward athletes, particularly in high-profile sports such as diving and table tennis.

== Incident ==
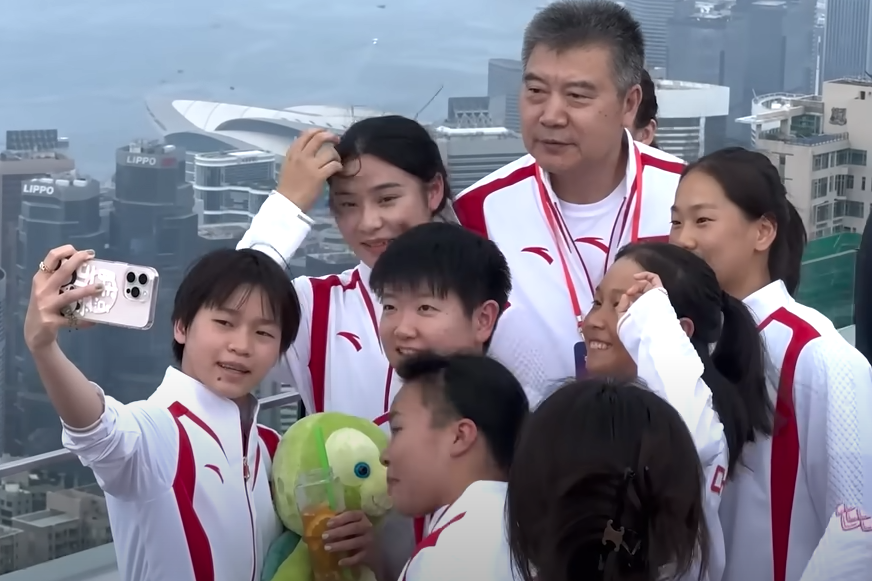
Quan (holding phone) and other members of the Chinese team to the 2024 Summer Olympics, in Macau (September 2024)

In March 2026, Quan was interviewed by the Chinese magazine Renwu (人物), where she spoke publicly about the physical and psychological challenges she experienced following the 2024 Olympics. She described undergoing normal physical changes, including weight fluctuations, which led to increased anxiety about her body and performance. She stated that she had become fearful of weighing herself and had at one point considered retiring from the sport. At the same time, Quan spoke about increased scrutiny from the public and media, including negative comments about her appearance and athletic condition. She also noted that her family home in Zhanjiang had been repeatedly visited by fans, influencers and livestreaming groups, disrupting her family's daily life. In her interview, she appealed for an end to harassment directed at her and her relatives.

In late March 2026, shortly after the release of Quan's interview, screenshots of a private WeChat group titled "Splash Conquerors Alliance" began circulating online. The group reportedly had around 282 members; it reportedly had a rule that "personal attacks are prohibited (except for Quan Hongchan)" and instances of members encouraging each other to "scold [Quan] to death." The screenshots indicated that members of the group engaged in coordinated harassment targeting Quan. Messages allegedly included derogatory nicknames, personal insults and unverified claims about her private life.

Some content suggested that members were encouraged to direct sustained verbal abuse toward her. Individuals who defended Quan were also reportedly mocked within the group. The incident gained further attention due to speculation that some group participants were linked to individuals within the Chinese sports system, including Quan Hongchan's national team teammates Chen Yuxi, Chang Yani, Chen Yiwen and Long Daoyi. In addition, CCTV sports reporter Yang Shuo and international referee Rao Lang were reported to be members of the group. Chinese table tennis player Wang Chuqin was also reported to have been among those attacked along with Quan in the group.

== Official responses ==
On April 8, 2026, the Guangdong Ersha Sports Training Center, where Quan trains, announced that it had reported the incident to public security authorities and would pursue legal action. The General Administration of Sport of China stated that it supported protecting athletes' rights through legal means and would take the matter seriously. Chinese state media emphasized that online groups carry a degree of public responsibility and that administrators may bear legal consequences if they fail to regulate harmful content.

On April 10, 2026, police in Guangzhou announced the detention of a 31-year-old man surnamed Xu, identified as one of the group's founders. Authorities stated that he had posted insulting remarks about athletes in the group, resulting in negative social impact. He was given 10 days of administrative detention. Police also stated that other individuals involved were dealt with according to law and that the WeChat group had been disbanded.

== Reactions and analysis ==
The incident generated widespread discussion on Chinese social media platforms. Related topics on Sina Weibo reportedly exceeded 100 million views. Many users expressed sympathy for Quan and called for strict action against the perpetrators. However, after authorities attributed the incident to "distorted fan culture" and imposed a 10-day administrative detention on an individual identified as the group's founder, public opinion became divided. Some commenters argued that the response did not address the underlying causes of the incident. They suggested that the case may involve interpersonal dynamics within the sports system or workplace bullying, rather than being solely the result of fan behavior, and expressed dissatisfaction with the penalties imposed. In comment sections of official media outlets, including People's Daily, a large number of critical comments questioning the handling of the case were reportedly posted, with some subsequently being removed by censors. Writing for China Daily, journalist Cao Yin stated that "the fight against cyberbullying is not about protecting any single individual; it is about safeguarding all of us."

Separately, media and legal analysts provided broader institutional interpretations of the incident. Eva Cheuk-Yin Li, a lecturer at King's College London, noted that the case reflects tensions between China's state-managed elite sports system and increasingly commercialized fan culture, in which the boundary between public attention and intrusive monitoring may become blurred. Meanwhile, Procuratorate Daily (检察日报), a Chinese state-affiliated publication of the Supreme People's Procuratorate, argued that semi-closed online spaces such as messaging groups should not serve as a means of evading legal responsibility. It recommended strengthening the accountability of group administrators and reducing barriers to legal redress, in order to address the imbalance between the low cost of online abuse and the high cost of pursuing legal remedies.
