= North Korea at the 2025 World Aquatics Championships =

- Flag of North Korea
- World Aquatics code: PRK
- National federation: North Korean Aquatics Federation

in Singapore
- Competitors: 15 in 2 sports
- Medals Ranked 23rd: Gold 0 Silver 1 Bronze 1 Total 2

World Aquatics Championships appearances
- 1973; 1975; 1978; 1982; 1986; 1991; 1994; 1998; 2001; 2003; 2005; 2007; 2009; 2011; 2013; 2015; 2017; 2019; 2022; 2023; 2024; 2025

North Korea competed at the 2025 World Aquatics Championships in Singapore from July 11 to August 3, 2025.

== Medalists ==
Medal	Name	Sport	Event	Date
2nd place, silver medalist(s)	Choe Wi-hyon; Jo Jin-mi	Diving	Mixed synchronized 10 metre platform	27 July 2025
3rd place, bronze medalist(s)	Jo Jin-mi; Kim Mi-hwa	Diving	Women's synchronized 10 metre platform	28 July 2025

== Competitors ==
The following is the list of competitors in the Championships.

Sport	Men	Women	Total
Artistic swimming	0	9	9
Diving	3	3	6
Total	3	12	15

== Artistic swimming ==
Mixed

Athlete	Event	Preliminaries		Final	
Athlete	Event	Points	Rank	Points	Rank
Choe Ra-yon; Han Ryu-jong; Kang Un-a; Kim Hyon-jong; Kim Il-sim; Pak Hyon-a; So Hyon-ju; Yun Kyong-ryong	Team technical routine	223.2442	19	Did not advance	
Choe Ra-yon; Han Ryu-jong; Kang Un-a; Kim Hyon-jong; Kim Il-sim; Pak Hyon-a; So Hyon-ju; Yun Kyong-ryong	Team free routine	245.1942	11 Q	249.6529	10
Han Ryu-jong; Kang Un-a; Kim Hyon-jong; Kim Il-sim; Pak Hyon-a; Ri Yu-jong; So Hyon-ju; Yun Kyong-ryong	Team acrobatic routine	165.0262	18	Did not advance	

== Diving ==
Men

Athlete	Event	Preliminaries		Semifinals		Final	
Athlete	Event	Points	Rank	Points	Rank	Points	Rank
Choe Wi-hyon	10 m platform	392.70	14 Q	428.75	11 Q	456.20	8
Jo Ryu-myong	10 m platform	318.50	38	Did not advance			
Jo Ryu-myong; Ko Che-won	10 m synchro platform	335.61	13	—		Did not advance	

Women

Athlete	Event	Preliminaries		Semifinals		Final	
Athlete	Event	Points	Rank	Points	Rank	Points	Rank
Jo Jin-mi	10 m platform	323.50	3 Q	348.10	2 Q	338.00	6
Kim Ji-hye	1 m springboard	193.70	42	—		Did not advance	
Kim Ji-hye; Kim Mi-hwa	3 m synchro springboard	230.85	12	—		Did not advance	
Jo Jin-mi; Kim Mi-hwa	10 m synchro platform	308.46	2 Q	—		293.34	3rd place, bronze medalist(s)

Mixed

Athlete	Event	Final	
Athlete	Event	Points	Rank
Ko Che-won; Kim Mi-hwa	3 m synchro springboard	267.63	6
Choe Wi-hyon; Jo Jin-mi	10 m synchro platform	322.98	2nd place, silver medalist(s)
Ko Che-won; Jo Jin-mi; Kim Mi-hwa; Choe Wi-hyon	Team event	340.85	13
