= Diving at the 2026 Asian Games – Women's synchronized 10 metre platform =

Diving competition

Women's synchronized 10 metre platform at the 2026 Asian Games
- Venue: Tokyo Aquatics Centre
- Date: 26 September 2026
- Competitors: 12 from 6 nations

Medalists
gold medal	Chen Yuxi; Lu Wei	China
silver medal	Jo Jin-mi; Kim Mi-rae	North Korea
bronze medal	Kim Na-hyun; Moon Na-yun	South Korea

The women's synchronized 10 metre platform competition at the 2026 Asian Games took place on 26 September 2026 at Tokyo Aquatics Centre.

== Schedule ==
All times are Japan Standard Time (UTC+09:00)

Date	Time	Event
Saturday, 26 September 2026	10:00	Final

== Results ==
Rank	Team	Dive					Total
Rank	Team	1	2	3	4	5	Total
1st place, gold medalist(s)	China (CHN); Chen Yuxi; Lu Wei	54.00	55.20	78.30	81.60	78.72	347.82
2nd place, silver medalist(s)	North Korea (PRK); Jo Jin-mi; Kim Mi-rae	46.80	48.00	70.20	78.72	73.92	317.64
3rd place, bronze medalist(s)	South Korea (KOR); Kim Na-hyun; Moon Na-yun	48.00	46.80	63.84	53.94	64.32	276.90
4	Malaysia (MAS); Pandelela Rinong; Nur Eilisha Rania	43.80	40.20	53.10	66.99	43.20	247.29
5	Macau (MAC); Zhao Hang U Pou Sin Lam	39.00	33.00	47.88	45.00	43.68	208.56
6	Singapore (SGP); Ryenne Cham; Ainslee Kwang	18.60	40.20	51.24	53.04	44.10	207.18
