= Diving at the 2025 World Aquatics Championships – Mixed synchronized 10 metre platform =

Mixed synchronized 10 metre platform at the Diving at the 2025 World Aquatics Championships
- Venue: OCBC Aquatic Centre
- Location: Singapore
- Dates: 27 July
- Competitors: 24 from 12 nations
- Teams: 12
- Winning points: 323.04

Medalists
gold medal	Zhu Yongxin; Xie Peiling	China
silver medal	Choe Wi-hyon; Jo Jin-mi	North Korea
bronze medal	Aleksandr Bondar; Anna Konanykhina

The Mixed synchronized 10 metre platform competition at the 2025 World Aquatics Championships was held on 27 July 2025.

== Results ==
The final was held at 15:02.

Rank	Nation	Points
1st place, gold medalist(s)	China; Zhu Yongxin; Xie Peiling	323.04
2nd place, silver medalist(s)	North Korea; Choe Wi-hyon; Jo Jin-mi	322.98
3rd place, bronze medalist(s)	Neutral Athletes B Aleksandr Bondar; Anna Konanykhina	311.88
4	Mexico; Kevin Berlín; Alejandra Estudillo	304.56
5	United States; Tyler Wills; Bayleigh Cranford	296.13
6	Ukraine; Kirill Boliukh; Kseniya Baylo	294.66
7	Italy; Riccardo Giovannini; Sarah Jodoin Di Maria	280.14
8	Australia; Cassiel Rousseau; Milly Puckeridge	279.48
9	Cuba; Carlos Ramos; Anisley García	267.78
10	South Korea; Shin Jung-whi; Moon Na-yun	259.62
11	Malaysia; Elvis Priestly Anak Clement; Lee Yiat Qing	247.86
12	Singapore; Yim Shek Yen; Ainslee Kwang	238.62
