= North Korea at the 2024 Summer Olympics =

- IOC code: PRK
- NOC: Olympic Committee of the Democratic People's Republic of Korea

in Paris, France 26 July 2024 – 11 August 2024
- Competitors: 16 (4 men and 12 women) in 7 sports
- Flag bearers: Im Yong-myong & Mun Song-hui
- Medals Ranked 68th: Gold 0 Silver 2 Bronze 4 Total 6

Summer Olympics appearances (overview)
- 1972; 1976; 1980; 1984–1988; 1992; 1996; 2000; 2004; 2008; 2012; 2016; 2020; 2024

North Korea competed as the Democratic People's Republic of Korea at the 2024 Summer Olympics in Paris from 26 July to 11 August 2024. North Korea's eleventh Summer Olympics appearance marked the official return of the nation to the sporting event after withdrawing from the games in 2020 due to the COVID-19 pandemic.

== Medalists ==
Medal	Name	Sport	Event	Date
Silver	Ri Jong-sik; Kim Kum-yong	Table tennis	Mixed doubles	30 July
Silver	Kim Mi-rae; Jo Jin-mi	Diving	Women's synchronized 10 m platform	31 July
Bronze	Pang Chol-mi	Boxing	Women's 54 kg	4 August
Bronze	Kim Mi-rae	Diving	Women's 10 m platform	6 August
Bronze	Ri Se-ung	Wrestling	Men's Greco-Roman –60 kg	6 August
Bronze	Choe Hyo-gyong	Wrestling	Women's freestyle –53 kg	8 August

=== Medals by sport ===
Medals by sport
Sport	Gold	Silver	Bronze	Total
Diving	0	1	1	2
Table tennis	0	1	0	1
Boxing	0	0	1	1
Wrestling	0	0	2	2
Total	0	2	4	6

=== Medals by day ===
Medals by day
Day	Date	Gold	Silver	Bronze	Total
1	30 July	0	1	0	1
2	31 July	0	1	0	1
3	4 August	0	0	1	1
4	6 August	0	0	2	2
5	8 August	0	0	1	1
	Total	0	2	4	6

=== Medals by gender ===
Medals by gender
Gender	Gold	Silver	Bronze	Total
Female	0	1	3	4
Male	0	0	1	1
Mixed/Open	0	1	0	1
Total	0	2	4	6

Multiple medalists
Name	Sport	1st place, gold medalist(s)	2nd place, silver medalist(s)	3rd place, bronze medalist(s)	Total
Kim Mi-rae	Diving	0	1	1	2

== Competitors ==
The following is the list of number of competitors in the Games.

Sport	Men	Women	Total
Athletics	1	0	1
Boxing	0	2	2
Diving	1	2	3
Gymnastics	0	1	1
Judo	0	1	1
Table tennis	1	2	3
Wrestling	1	4	5
Total	4	12	16

== Athletics ==
North Korean track and field athletes qualified for Paris 2024 by receiving the direct universality spots in the following event:

Key

- Note–Ranks given for track events are within the athlete's heat only
- Q = Qualified for the next round
- q = Qualified for the next round as a fastest loser or, in field events, by position without achieving the qualifying target
- NR = National record
- N/A = Round not applicable for the event
- Bye = Athlete not required to compete in round

Track and road events

Athlete	Event	Final	
Athlete	Event	Result	Rank
Han Il-ryong	Men's marathon	2:11:21	29

== Boxing ==
North Korea entered two boxers into the Olympic tournament. Pang Chol-mi (women's bantamweight) and Won Ung-yong (women's lightweight) qualified themself for Paris in their respective division by advancing to the semifinal round at the 2022 Asian Games in Hangzhou, China.

Athlete	Event	Round of 32	Round of 16	Quarterfinals	Semifinals	Final	
Athlete	Event	Opposition Result	Opposition Result	Opposition Result	Opposition Result	Opposition Result	Rank
Pang Chol-mi	Women's 54 kg	Bye	Uktamova (UZB); W 5–0	Bertal (MAR); W 4–0	Chang (CHN); L 2–3	Did not advance	3rd place, bronze medalist(s)
Won Un-gyong	Women's 60 kg	Bye	Heijnen (NED); L 1–4	Did not advance			

== Diving ==
North Korean divers secured one quota place for Paris 2024 by being the top individuals of the men's and women's platform at the 2024 World Aquatics Championships in Doha, Qatar.

Athlete	Event	Preliminary		Semifinal		Final	
Athlete	Event	Points	Rank	Points	Rank	Points	Rank
Im Yong-myong	Men's 10 m platform	347.10	22	Did not advance			
Kim Mi-rae	Women's 10 m platform	287.70	10	322.40	4	372.10	3rd place, bronze medalist(s)
Kim Mi-rae; Jo Jin-mi	Women's 10 m synchronized platform	—N/a				315.90	2nd place, silver medalist(s)

== Gymnastics ==
=== Artistic ===
North Korea entered one gymnast to compete at the games. An Chang-ok secured a quota place by becoming one of the highest eligible gymnasts in the women's vault, not yet qualified, through the final ranking of 2024 FIG Artistic Gymnastics World Cup series.

Women

Athlete	Event	Qualification						Final					
Athlete	Event	Apparatus				Total	Rank	Apparatus				Total	Rank
Athlete	Event	V	UB	BB	F	Total	Rank	V	UB	BB	F	Total	Rank
An Chang-ok	All-around	14.183 Q	13.433	DNS	11.666	DNF		Did not advance					
An Chang-ok	Women's vault	14.183	—N/a			14.183	6 Q	14.216	—N/a			14.216	4

== Judo ==
North Korea qualified one judoka for the following weight class at the Games. Mun Song-hui (women's middleweight, 70 kg) got qualified via continental quota based on Olympic point rankings.

Athlete	Event	Round of 32	Round of 16	Quarterfinals	Semifinals	Repechage	Final / BM	
Athlete	Event	Opposition Result	Opposition Result	Opposition Result	Opposition Result	Opposition Result	Opposition Result	Rank
Mun Song-hui	Women's −70 kg	Matniyazova (UZB); L 00–10	Did not advance					

== Table tennis ==
North Korea qualified a mixed doubles team and one women's singles for the Games, by winning the semifinal match, at the 2024 ITTF World Mixed Doubles Olympic Qualification at Havířov, Czech Republic; and through the re-allocations of the East Asian Qualification Tournament.

Athlete	Event	Preliminary	Round 1	Round 2	Round 3	Round of 16	Quarterfinals	Semifinals	Final / BM	
Athlete	Event	Opposition Result	Opposition Result	Opposition Result	Opposition Result	Opposition Result	Opposition Result	Opposition Result	Opposition Result	Rank
Pyon Song-gyong	Women's singles	Bye	Bye	Doo (HKG); W 4–1	Mittelham (GER); W 4–3	Díaz (PUR); W 4–3	Hayata (JPN); L 3–4	Did not advance		
Ri Jong-sik; Kim Kum-yong	Mixed doubles	—N/a				Harimoto / Hayata (JPN); W 4–1	Karlsson / Källberg (SWE); W 4–1	Wong / Doo (HKG); W 4–3	Wang / Sun (CHN); L 2–4	2nd place, silver medalist(s)

== Wrestling ==
North Korea qualified five wrestlers into the Olympic competition. Four of them qualified for the games following the triumph of winning the semifinal round at the 2024 Asian Olympic Qualification Tournament in Bishkek, Kyrgyzstan; meanwhile the other wrestler qualified through the 2024 World Qualification Tournament in Istanbul, Turkey.

Key:

- VT (ranking points: 5–0 or 0–5) – Victory by fall.
- VB (ranking points: 5–0 or 0–5) – Victory by injury (VF for forfeit, VA for withdrawal or disqualification)
- PP (ranking points: 3–1 or 1–3) – Decision by points – the loser with technical points.
- PO (ranking points: 3–0 or 0–3) – Decision by points – the loser without technical points.
- ST (ranking points: 4–0 or 0–4) – Great superiority – the loser without technical points and a margin of victory of at least 8 (Greco-Roman) or 10 (freestyle) points.
- SP (ranking points: 4–1 or 1–4) – Technical superiority – the loser with technical points and a margin of victory of at least 8 (Greco-Roman) or 10 (freestyle) points.

Freestyle

Athlete	Event	Round of 16	Quarterfinal	Semifinal	Repechage	Final / BM	
Athlete	Event	Opposition Result	Opposition Result	Opposition Result	Opposition Result	Opposition Result	Rank
Kim Son-hyang	Women's −50 kg	Did not participate					
Choe Hyo-gyong	Women's −53 kg	Yépez (ECU); L 4–7	Did not advance		Ana (ROU); W 11–0	Wendle (GER); W 10–0	3rd place, bronze medalist(s)
Mun Hyon-gyong	Women's −62 kg	Did not participate					
Pak Sol-gum	Women's −68 kg	Rîngaci (MDA); W 10–6	Dahiya (IND); W 10–8	Elor (USA); L 0–10	—N/a	Çavuşoğlu (TUR); L 2–4	5

Greco-Roman

Athlete	Event	Round of 16	Quarterfinal	Semifinal	Repechage	Final / BM	
Athlete	Event	Opposition Result	Opposition Result	Opposition Result	Opposition Result	Opposition Result	Rank
Ri Se-ung	Men's −60 kg	Ciobanu (MDA); W 10–3	Bakhromov (UZB); W 9–0	Cao (CHN); L 3–3	—N/a	Rodríguez (VEN); W 8–0	3rd place, bronze medalist(s)
