= Diving at the 2026 Asian Games – Women's 10 metre platform =

Diving competition

Women's 10 metre platform at the 2026 Asian Games
- Venue: Tokyo Aquatics Centre
- Date: 29 September 2026
- Competitors: 12 from 7 nations

Medalists
gold medal	Chen Yuxi	China
silver medal	Lu Wei	China
bronze medal	Jo Jin-mi	North Korea

The women's 10 metre platform competition at the 2026 Asian Games took place on 29 September 2026 at Tokyo Aquatics Centre.

== Schedule ==
All times are Japan Standard Time (UTC+09:00)

Date	Time	Event
Tuesday, 29 September 2026	10:00	Preliminary
Tuesday, 29 September 2026	15:20	Final

== Results ==
Legend

- DNS — Did not start

=== Preliminary ===
Rank	Athlete	Dive					Total
Rank	Athlete	1	2	3	4	5	Total
1	Lu Wei (CHN)	72.00	81.60	77.55	84.15	84.80	400.10
2	Chen Yuxi (CHN)	76.50	83.20	84.15	70.95	81.60	396.40
3	Jo Jin-mi (PRK)	67.50	62.40	43.40	65.60	72.00	310.90
4	Rin Kaneto (JPN)	54.60	43.20	59.40	58.50	67.65	283.35
5	Moon Na-yun (KOR)	49.00	49.30	58.80	58.50	54.40	270.00
6	Kim Mi-hwa (PRK)	66.00	59.20	18.15	64.00	57.60	264.95
7	Kim Na-hyun (KOR)	54.60	36.25	58.50	42.00	56.00	247.35
8	Pandelela Rinong (MAS)	45.00	58.00	62.40	44.80	33.60	243.80
9	Ainslee Kwang (SGP)	50.40	34.80	49.60	36.00	58.80	229.60
10	Nur Eilisha Rania (MAS)	53.20	44.20	43.20	29.00	52.50	222.10
11	Ryenne Cham (SGP)	51.80	20.30	49.50	44.20	22.40	188.20
—	Pou Sin Lam (MAC)						DNS

=== Final ===
Rank	Athlete	Dive					Total
Rank	Athlete	1	2	3	4	5	Total
1st place, gold medalist(s)	Chen Yuxi (CHN)	76.50	86.40	92.40	97.35	80.00	432.65
2nd place, silver medalist(s)	Lu Wei (CHN)	75.00	70.40	84.15	74.25	81.60	385.40
3rd place, bronze medalist(s)	Jo Jin-mi (PRK)	63.00	76.80	67.20	75.20	81.60	363.80
4	Kim Mi-hwa (PRK)	64.50	68.80	27.55	67.20	72.00	300.05
5	Rin Kaneto (JPN)	63.00	65.60	39.60	58.50	72.60	299.30
6	Pandelela Rinong (MAS)	58.50	59.45	57.60	52.80	60.80	289.15
7	Kim Na-hyun (KOR)	63.00	46.40	55.50	43.50	54.40	262.80
8	Moon Na-yun (KOR)	58.80	58.00	54.60	40.50	48.00	259.90
9	Ainslee Kwang (SGP)	50.40	58.00	41.60	40.50	58.80	249.30
10	Ryenne Cham (SGP)	47.60	44.95	49.50	46.80	43.40	232.25
11	Nur Eilisha Rania (MAS)	58.80	46.80	21.60	60.90	28.50	216.60
