= Diving at the 2024 Summer Olympics – Women's 10 metre platform =

Women's 10 metre platform at the Games of the XXXIII Olympiad
- Venue: Paris Aquatics Centre
- Date: 5 August 2024 (Preliminary); 6 August 2024 (semifinals & Final)
- Competitors: 29 from 21 nations

Medalists
1st place, gold medalist(s)		Quan Hongchan	China
2nd place, silver medalist(s)		Chen Yuxi	China
3rd place, bronze medalist(s)		Kim Mi-rae	North Korea

The women's 10 metre platform diving competition at the 2024 Summer Olympics in Paris was held at the Paris Aquatics Centre over 5 and 6 August 2024. It was the 26th appearance of the event, which had been held at every Olympic Games since the 1912 Summer Olympics.

== Competition format ==
The competition was to be held in three rounds

- Preliminary round: All divers perform five dives; the top 18 divers advance to the semi-final.
- Semi-final: The scores of the preliminary round are erased. The 18 remaining divers perform five dives each, and the top 12 divers advance to the final.
- Final: The semi-final scores are erased. The 12 final divers perform five dives each, and the top three divers win the gold, silver and bronze medals respectively.

Within each round of five dives, at least one dive must be from each of the six groups (forward, back, reverse, inward, twisting, and armstand). Each dive is assigned a degree of difficulty based on somersaults, position, twists, approach, and entry. There is no limit to the degree of difficulty of dives; the most difficult dives calculated in the FINA rulebook (reverse 4 1/2 somersault in pike position and back 4 1/2 somersault in pike position) are 4.7, but competitors could attempt more difficult dives. Scoring is done by a panel of seven judges. For each dive, each judge gives a score between 0 and 10 with 0.5 point increments. The top two and bottom two scores are discarded. The remaining three scores are summed and multiplied by the degree of difficulty to give a dive score. The five dive scores are summed to give the score for the round.

== Schedule ==
All times are Central European Time (UTC+1)

Date	Time	Round
5 August 2024	10:00; 15:00	Preliminary; Semifinal
6 August 2024	15:00	Final

== Qualification ==
The qualification spots for the Women's 10 metre platform diving event were attributed as follows:

- 2023 World Championships – The top twelve finalists of each individual event obtained a quota place for their NOC at the 2023 World Aquatics Championships, scheduled for July 14 to 30, in Fukuoka, Japan.
- Continental Qualification Tournaments – The winners of each individual event obtained a quota place for their NOC at one of the five continental meets (Africa, the Americas, Asia, Europe, and Oceania) approved by World Aquatics.
- 2024 World Championships – Twelve highest-ranked divers eligible for qualification obtained a quota place for their NOC in each individual event at the 2024 FINA World Championships, scheduled for February 2 to 18, in Doha, Qatar, respecting the two-member country limit and without surpassing the total quota of 136.
- Reallocation – Additional spots were allocated to the eligible divers placed thirteenth and above in their corresponding individual events, respecting the two-member country limit, at the 2024 World Aquatics Championships until they attain the total quota of 136.
- Host nation – As the host country, France reserves four women's spots to be distributed across the individual diving events.

== Results ==
29 divers entered the event, representing 21 nations.

Rank	Diver	Nation	Preliminary		Semi final		Final					Total
Rank	Diver	Nation	Score	Rank	Score	Rank	Dive 1	Dive 2	Dive 3	Dive 4	Dive 5	Total
1st place, gold medalist(s)	Quan Hongchan	China	421.25	1	421.05	1	90.00	84.80	76.80	92.40	81.60	425.60
2nd place, silver medalist(s)	Chen Yuxi	China	382.15	2	403.05	2	82.50	78.40	89.10	89.10	81.60	420.70
3rd place, bronze medalist(s)	Kim Mi-rae	North Korea	287.70	10	322.40	4	80.00	67.50	72.60	76.80	75.20	372.10
4	Caeli McKay	Canada	324.90	3	308.85	7	72.00	63.00	76.80	75.90	76.80	364.50
5	Gabriela Agúndez	Mexico	306.95	6	295.00	9	67.50	79.20	62.40	69.30	72.00	350.40
6	Andrea Spendolini-Sirieix	Great Britain	320.80	4	367.00	3	76.80	62.40	64.50	60.20	81.60	345.50
7	Ellie Cole	Australia	290.00	9	309.90	6	64.50	72.00	67.20	67.20	62.40	333.30
8	Alejandra Orozco	Mexico	320.80	4	312.00	5	63.00	64.00	68.80	67.20	57.60	320.60
9	Matsuri Arai	Japan	280.65	16	300.50	8	63.00	66.00	65.25	65.80	54.40	314.45
10	Sarah Jodoin Di Maria	Italy	286.10	11	294.85	10	72.00	64.50	56.00	42.05	67.20	301.75
11	Melissa Wu	Australia	285.20	13	294.10	11	58.50	64.00	40.60	52.80	62.40	278.30
12	Else Praasterink	Netherlands	281.60	15	292.80	12	52.20	44.80	45.00	57.60	50.75	250.35
13	Lois Toulson	Great Britain	299.60	8	278.50	13	Did not advance					
14	Ana Carvajal	Spain	285.60	12	276.90	14	Did not advance					
15	Delaney Schnell	United States	278.15	17	271.95	15	Did not advance					
16	Anisley García	Cuba	283.00	14	270.65	16	Did not advance					
17	Christina Wassen	Germany	303.20	7	255.55	17	Did not advance					
18	Maia Biginelli	Italy	277.00	18	240.80	18	Did not advance					
19	Daryn Wright	United States	272.25	19	Did not advance							
20	Kate Miller	Canada	266.30	20	Did not advance							
21	Pauline Pfeif	Germany	264.15	21	Did not advance							
22	Džeja Delanija Patrika	Latvia	259.30	22	Did not advance							
23	Ingrid Oliveira	Brazil	255.90	23	Did not advance							
24	Maycey Adrianne Vieta	Puerto Rico	253.90	24	Did not advance							
25	Sofiya Lyskun	Ukraine	253.10	25	Did not advance							
26	Kim Na-hyun	South Korea	250.00	26	Did not advance							
27	Victoria Garza	Dominican Republic	226.80	27	Did not advance							
28	Malak Tawfik	Egypt	193.75	28	Did not advance							
29	Ciara McGing	Ireland	188.50	29	Did not advance							
