= Malaysia at the 2025 World Aquatics Championships =

- Flag of Malaysia
- World Aquatics code: MAS
- National federation: Malaysia Swimming Federation
- Website: malaysiaswimming.org

in Singapore
- Competitors: 12 in 2 sports
- Medals Ranked 7th: Gold 0 Silver 0 Bronze 0 Total 0

World Aquatics Championships appearances
- 1973; 1975; 1978; 1982; 1986; 1991; 1994; 1998; 2001; 2003; 2005; 2007; 2009; 2011; 2013; 2015; 2017; 2019; 2022; 2023; 2024; 2025

Malaysia competed at the 2025 World Aquatics Championships in Singapore from July 11 to August 3, 2025.

== Competitors ==
The following is the list of competitors in the Championships.

Sport	Men	Women	Total
Diving	5	2	7
Swimming	4	1	5
Total	9	3	12

== Diving ==
Men

Athlete	Event	Preliminaries		Semifinals		Final	
Athlete	Event	Points	Rank	Points	Rank	Points	Rank
Elvis Anak	10 m platform	432.90	10 Q	399.80	16	Did not advance	
Nurqayyum Nazmi bin Mohamad Nazim	1 m springboard	274.35	44	—		Did not advance	
Nurqayyum Nazmi bin Mohamad Nazim	3 m springboard	303.55	54	Did not advance			
Enrique Harold	10 m platform	323.45	37	Did not advance			
Syafiq Puteh	3 m springboard	310.55	53	Did not advance			
Yong Rui Jie	1 m springboard	283.90	41	Did not advance			
Nurqayyum Nazmi bin Mohamad Nazim; Yong Rui Jie	3 m synchro springboard	302.76	21	—		Did not advance	
Elvis Anak; Enrique Harold	10 m synchro platform	378.36	6 Q	—		374.70	7

Women

Athlete	Event	Preliminaries		Semifinals		Final	
Athlete	Event	Points	Rank	Points	Rank	Points	Rank
Lee Yiat Qing	10 m platform	240.20	29	Did not advance			
Lee Yiat Qing; Pandelela Rinong	10 m synchro platform	WD		—		Did not advance	

Mixed

Athlete	Event	Final	
Athlete	Event	Points	Rank
Elvis Anak; Lee Yiat Qing	10 m synchro platform	247.86	11
Elvis Anak; Enrique Harold; Lee Yiat Qing; Pandelela Rinong	Team event	322.55	16

== Swimming ==
Malaysia entered 5 swimmers.

Men

Athlete	Event	Heat		Semi-final		Final	
Athlete	Event	Time	Rank	Time	Rank	Time	Rank
Andrew Goh	50 m breaststroke	28.21	47	Did not advance			
Andrew Goh	100 m breaststroke	Did not start		Did not advance			
Khiew Hoe Yean	100 m freestyle	50.77	50	Did not advance			
Khiew Hoe Yean	200 m freestyle	1:48.10	31	Did not advance			
Khiew Hoe Yean	400 m freestyle	3:51.11	28	—		Did not advance	
Khiew Hoe Yean	800 m freestyle	8:08.62	22	—		Did not advance	
Tan Khai Xin	200 m individual medley	2:07.07	40	Did not advance			
Tan Khai Xin	400 m individual medley	4:30.90	29	—		Did not advance	
Singh Chahal Arvin Shaun; Khiew Hoe Yean; Tan Khai Xin; Andrew Goh	4 × 200 m freestyle relay	7:29.30	16	—		Did not advance	
Singh Chahal Arvin Shaun; Khiew Hoe Yean; Tan Khai Xin; Andrew Goh	4 × 100 m medley relay	3:46.80	25	—		Did not advance	

Women

Athlete	Event	Heat		Semi-final		Final	
Athlete	Event	Time	Rank	Time	Rank	Time	Rank
Phee Jinq En	50 m breaststroke	31.78	30	Did not advance			
Phee Jinq En	100 m breaststroke	Did not start		Did not advance			
