= Diving at the 2025 World Aquatics Championships – Men's 10 metre platform =

Men's 10 metre platform at the Diving at the 2025 World Aquatics Championships
- Venue: OCBC Aquatic Centre
- Location: Singapore
- Dates: 2 August (preliminaries); 3 August (semifinal and final)
- Competitors: 48 from 29 nations
- Winning points: 534.80

Medalists
gold medal	Cassiel Rousseau	Australia
silver medal	Oleksiy Sereda	Ukraine
bronze medal	Randal Willars	Mexico

The Men's 10 metre platform competition at the 2025 World Aquatics Championships was held on 2 and 3 August 2025.

== Results ==
The preliminary round was started on 2 August at 09:02. The semifinal was started on 3 August at 10:02. The final was held on 3 August at 17:32.

Green denotes finalists

Blue denotes semifinalists

Rank	Diver	Nationality	Preliminary		Semifinal		Final	
Rank	Diver	Nationality	Points	Rank	Points	Rank	Points	Rank
1st place, gold medalist(s)	Cassiel Rousseau	Australia	483.50	2	478.20	4	534.80	1
2nd place, silver medalist(s)	Oleksiy Sereda	Ukraine	447.35	7	471.80	5	515.20	2
3rd place, bronze medalist(s)	Randal Willars	Mexico	441.75	8	446.20	8	511.95	3
4	Zhu Zifeng	China	461.70	4	502.55	1	506.10	4
5	Zhao Renjie	China	489.25	1	491.35	2	499.95	5
6	Rikuto Tamai	Japan	466.60	3	480.20	3	492.55	6
7	Ruslan Ternovoi	Neutral Athletes B	434.65	9	458.55	7	459.05	7
8	Choe Wi-hyon	North Korea	392.70	14	428.75	11	456.20	8
9	Benjamin Tessier	Canada	387.10	16	443.20	9	445.30	9
10	Jaden Eikermann	Germany	391.50	15	433.20	10	442.30	10
11	Nikita Shleikher	Neutral Athletes B	448.70	6	464.60	6	441.80	11
12	Robbie Lee	Great Britain	431.10	11	421.20	12	433.85	12
13	Jordan Rzepka	United States	449.80	5	410.70	13	Did not advance	
14	Riccardo Giovannini	Italy	383.80	17	409.15	14	Did not advance	
15	Mark Hrytsenko	Ukraine	418.30	12	405.35	15	Did not advance	
16	Elvis Anak	Malaysia	432.90	10	399.80	16	Did not advance	
17	Jorge Rodríguez	Spain	378.95	18	379.95	17	Did not advance	
18	Euan McCabe	Great Britain	412.55	13	368.15	18	Did not advance	
19	Jonah Mercieca	Australia	371.65	19	Did not advance			
20	Joshua Hedberg	United States	371.00	20	Did not advance			
21	Emilio Treviño	Mexico	367.30	21	Did not advance			
22	Isak Børslien	Norway	364.50	22	Did not advance			
23	Anton Knoll	Austria	361.50	23	Did not advance			
24	Shin Jung-whi	South Korea	360.50	24	Did not advance			
25	Simone Conte	Italy	359.95	25	Did not advance			
26	Jesús González	Venezuela	358.45	26	Did not advance			
27	Kang Min-hyuk	South Korea	355.35	27	Did not advance			
28	Nathan Brown	New Zealand	354.50	28	Did not advance			
29	Carlos Ramos	Cuba	354.15	29	Did not advance			
30	Rodrigo Cardona	Spain	351.20	30	Did not advance			
31	Dariush Lotfi	Austria	345.65	31	Did not advance			
32	Igor Myalin	Uzbekistan	343.95	32	Did not advance			
33	Matt Cullen	Canada	342.55	33	Did not advance			
34	Reo Nishida	Japan	335.10	34	Did not advance			
35	Max Lee	Singapore	330.85	35	Did not advance			
36	Ole Rösler	Germany	326.95	36	Did not advance			
37	Enrique Harold	Malaysia	323.45	37	Did not advance			
38	Jo Ryu-myong	North Korea	318.50	38	Did not advance			
39	Aleksa Teofilović	Serbia	307.05	39	Did not advance			
40	Vartan Bayanduryan	Armenia	305.20	40	Did not advance			
41	Tsvetomir Ereminov	Bulgaria	295.25	41	Did not advance			
42	Jackson Rondinelli	Brazil	294.20	42	Did not advance			
43	Miguel Cardoso	Brazil	289.20	43	Did not advance			
44	Bernaldo Arias	Cuba	288.20	44	Did not advance			
45	Stavros Sifnaios	Greece	262.70	45	Did not advance			
46	Indiver Sairem	India	253.90	46	Did not advance			
47	Wilson Ningthoujam	India	233.00	47	Did not advance			
48	Saymol Sánchez	Dominican Republic	155.50	48	Did not advance			
