= Xie Peiling =

Chinese diver (born 2010)

Personal information
- Nationality: Chinese
- Born: 30 January 2010 (age 16)

Sport
- Country: China
- Sport: Diving
- Event(s): 10 metre platform, synchronized platform
Medal record
Women's diving
Representing China
World Championships
Gold medal – first place	2025 Singapore	10 m mixed synchro
Bronze medal – third place	2025 Singapore	10 m platform

Xie Peiling (born 30 January 2010) is a Chinese diver.

== Career ==
Xie made her World Aquatics Championships debut in 2025 and won a gold medal in the 10 metre mixed synchro event, with a score of 323.04. She also won a bronze medal in the 10 metre platform event.
