= Diving at the 2024 World Aquatics Championships – Mixed synchronized 10 metre platform =

Mixed synchronized 10 metre platform at the 2024 World Aquatics Championships
- Venue: Hamad Aquatic Centre
- Location: Doha, Qatar
- Dates: 3 February
- Competitors: 18 from 9 nations
- Teams: 9
- Winning points: 353.82

Medalists
gold medal	Huang Jianjie; Zhang Jiaqi	China
silver medal	Im Yong-myong; Jo Jin-mi	North Korea
bronze medal	Kevin Berlín; Alejandra Estudillo	Mexico

The Mixed synchronized 10 metre platform competition at the 2024 World Aquatics Championships was held on 3 February 2024.

== Results ==
The final was started at 16:02.

Rank	Nation	Divers	Points
1st place, gold medalist(s)	China	Huang Jianjie; Zhang Jiaqi	353.82
2nd place, silver medalist(s)	North Korea	Im Yong-myong; Jo Jin-mi	303.96
3rd place, bronze medalist(s)	Mexico	Kevin Berlín; Alejandra Estudillo	296.13
4	United States	Tyler Wills; Bayleigh Cranford	291.90
5	Germany	Tom Waldsteiner; Elena Wassen	291.42
6	South Korea	Shin Jung-whi; Kim Na-hyun	262.80
7	Spain	Max Liñan; Ana Carvajal	242.76
8	Italy	Eduard Timbretti Gugiu; Irene Pesce	186.36
9	Macau	Zhang Hoi; Lo Ka Wai	180.03
