= Diving at the 2022 Asian Games – Women's synchronized 10 metre platform =

Diving competition

Women's synchronized 10 metre platform at the 2022 Asian Games
- Venue: Hangzhou Olympic Expo Aquatics Center
- Date: 30 September 2023
- Competitors: 10 from 5 nations

Medalists
gold medal	Quan Hongchan; Chen Yuxi	China
silver medal	Matsuri Arai; Minami Itahashi	Japan
bronze medal	Nur Dhabitah Sabri; Pandelela Rinong	Malaysia

The women's synchronized 10 metre platform competition at the 2022 Asian Games took place on 30 September 2023 at Hangzhou Olympic Expo Center.

== Schedule ==
All times are China Standard Time (UTC+08:00)

Date	Time	Event
Saturday, 30 September 2023	17:30	Final

== Results ==
Rank	Team	Dive					Total
Rank	Team	1	2	3	4	5	Total
1st place, gold medalist(s)	China (CHN); Quan Hongchan; Chen Yuxi	55.80	58.20	83.70	88.32	89.28	375.30
2nd place, silver medalist(s)	Japan (JPN); Matsuri Arai; Minami Itahashi	48.00	48.00	63.84	63.00	67.20	290.04
3rd place, bronze medalist(s)	Malaysia (MAS); Nur Dhabitah Sabri; Pandelela Rinong	48.00	46.80	53.10	53.76	65.28	266.94
4	South Korea (KOR); Moon Na-yun; Cho Eun-bi	46.20	44.40	59.64	56.55	56.70	263.49
5	Macau (MAC); Zhao Hang U Lo Ka Wai	37.80	38.40	39.00	44.16	39.60	198.96
