= Aleksandra Kedrina =

Russian diver (born 2009)

Personal information
- Born: 11 September 2009 (age 17) Moscow, Russia

Sport
- Country: Russia
- Sport: Diving

Aleksandra Dmitrievna Kedrina (Russian: Александра Дмитриевна Кедрина; born 11 September 2009) is a Russian diver.

== Early life ==
Kedrina was born in Moscow.

== Career ==
In May 2025, she and Anna Konanykhina won the silver medal in the women's 10 m platform synchro at the Super Final of the Diving World Cup.

In June 2025, she competed at the Russian Diving Championships and won the gold medal in the 10 m platform synchro event with Anna Konanykhina and the bronze medal in the mixed 10 m platform synchro event with Maxim Gulidov.

Later in the same month, she won the European Junior Diving Championships in the girls' 10 m platform event.

In May 2026, she competed at the Russian Diving Championships and won two gold medals: in the women's 10 m platform event and in the mixed 10 m platform synchro event with 14-year-old Miroslav Kiselev.
