= Alejandra Estudillo =

Mexican diver (born 2005)

Personal information
- Full name: Alejandra Estudillo Torres
- Nationality: Mexican
- Born: 20 May 2005 (age 21) Ixtacomitán, Chiapas

Sport
- Country: Mexico
- Sport: Diving
- College team: University of Texas
Medal record
Women's diving
Representing Mexico
World Championships
Silver medal – second place	2025 Singapore	10 m synchro
Silver medal – second place	2025 Singapore	Team
Bronze medal – third place	2024 Doha	10 m mixed synchro

Alejandra Estudillo Torres (Note: In this Spanish name, the first or paternal surname is Estudillo and the second or maternal family name is Torres.) (born 20 May 2005) is a Mexican diver. She represented Mexico at the 2024 Summer Olympics. She competes at the collegiate level for Texas.

== Early life ==
Estudillo was born to Fernanda Torres and Luis Estudillo. She was born and raised in Ixtacomitán, Chiapas before emigrating to Nuevo León to pursue her diving career at 14 years old.

== Career ==
In February 2024, Estudillo competed at the 2024 World Aquatics Championships and won a bronze medal in the 10 metre mixed synchro event. She then represented Mexico at the 2024 Summer Olympics in the 3 metre springboard event and finished in sixth place with a score of 301.95. On 30 August 2024, she signed with Texas.

In July 2025, she competed at the 2025 World Aquatics Championships and won silver medals in the 10 metre synchro and the team events. She also competed in the 10 metre platform event and finished in 12th place with a score of 288.70.
