= Quan Hongchan =

Chinese diver (born 2007)

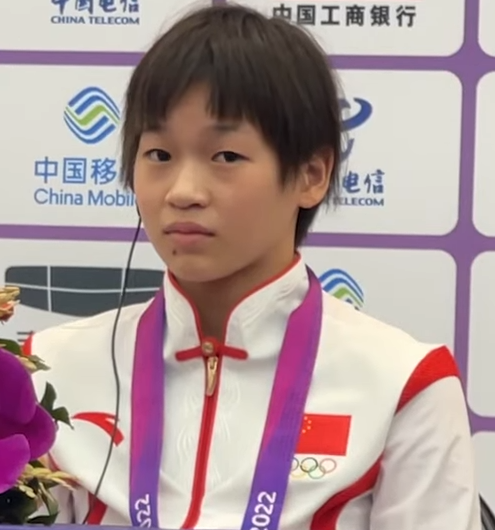
- Quan in 2023

Personal information
- Native name: 全红婵
- Nationality: Chinese
- Born: 28 March 2007 (age 19) Mazhang, Zhanjiang, Guangdong, China
- Height: 150 cm (4 ft 11 in)
- Weight: 39 kg (86 lb)

Sport
- Country: China
- Sport: Diving
- Events: 10 metre platform and synchronized platform
Medal record
Women's diving
Representing China
Olympic Games
Gold medal – first place	2020 Tokyo	10 m platform
Gold medal – first place	2024 Paris	10 m synchro
Gold medal – first place	2024 Paris	10 m platform
World Championships
Gold medal – first place	2022 Budapest	10 m synchro
Gold medal – first place	2022 Budapest	Team event
Gold medal – first place	2023 Fukuoka	10 m synchro
Gold medal – first place	2024 Doha	10 m platform
Gold medal – first place	2024 Doha	10 m synchro
Silver medal – second place	2022 Budapest	10 m platform
Silver medal – second place	2023 Fukuoka	10 m platform
Asian Games
Gold medal – first place	2022 Hangzhou	10 m platform
Gold medal – first place	2022 Hangzhou	10 m synchro

Quan Hongchan
- Traditional Chinese: 全紅嬋
- Simplified Chinese: 全红婵
Transcriptions
Standard Mandarin
- Hanyu Pinyin: Quán Hóngchán
Yue: Cantonese
- Yale Romanization: Chyùhn Hùhngsìm
- Jyutping: Cyun4 Hung4-sim4

Quan Hongchan (Chinese: 全红婵; pinyin: Quán Hóngchán; born 28 March 2007) is a Chinese diver, national champion, and Olympic champion. At the 2020 Summer Olympics, she won the gold medal in the individual 10 metre platform event. At the 2024 Summer Olympics, Quan won the gold medal in the individual 10 metre platform event and, alongside teammate Chen Yuxi, also won gold in the 10 metre synchronized platform.

Quan's dives have been notable for receiving perfect scores of 10 and producing minimal splash. A new phrase was created to describe her performances: "water splash disappearance technique".

In August 2021, Quan was awarded the "Chinese Youth May Fourth Medal" by the Central Committee of the Communist Youth League and the All-China Youth Federation. In September, she was awarded the "National Advanced Worker and Model Worker in the National Sports System" as an athlete; in the same month, the All-China Federation of Trade Unions awarded Quan the National May Day Labor Medal.

== Early life ==
Quan was born on 28 March 2007 in Mazhang District of Zhanjiang, Guangdong, China. She is the third of five children born to a family of farmers.

Quan was discovered when a sports academy recruited a group of freshmen to participate in a summer camp for diving. Her parents were very supportive of her decision to start competitive diving. Her brother Quan Jinhua has said, "She liked diving the first time she tried diving. When we go fishing and she sees water, she likes to play in the water. She likes to go to the beach too."

Quan has said that she "was not good at studying but [she] found confidence in diving."

== Career ==
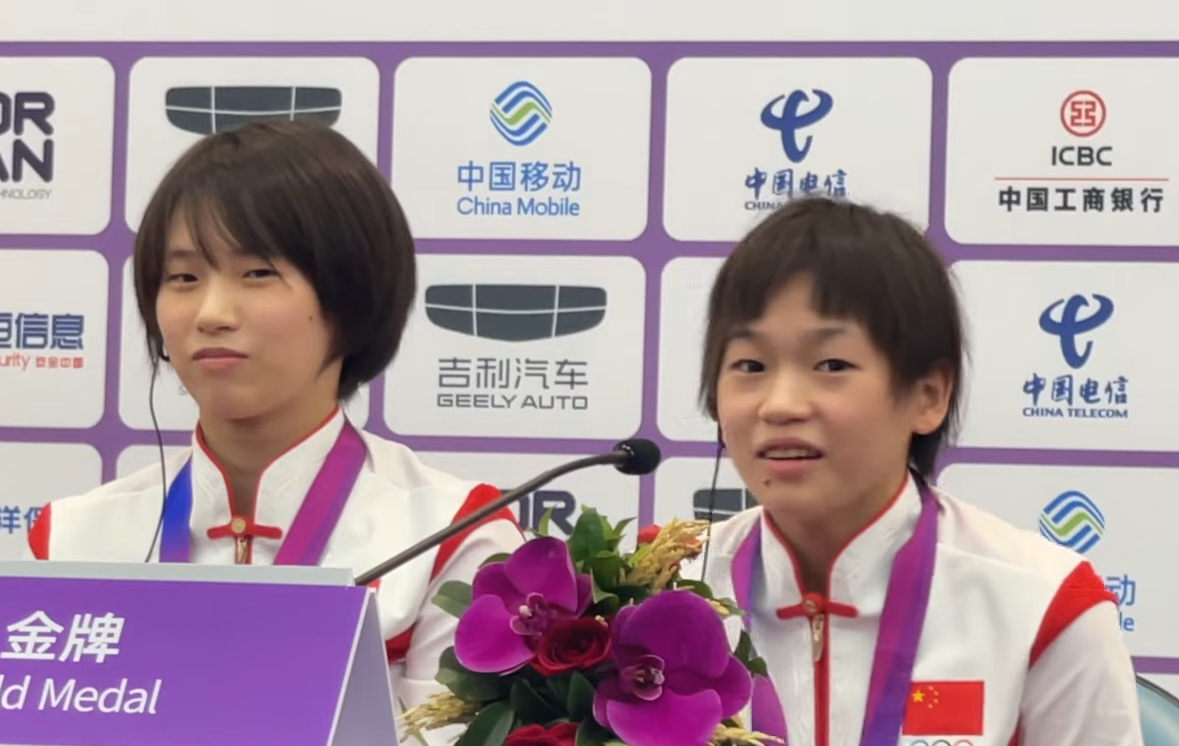
Quan with Chen Yuxi during the 19th Asian Games in Hangzhou, China (2023)

In July 2014, Quan was discovered by the enlightenment coach Chen Huaming while playing a lattice game on the school playground, so she began to receive diving training. In September of the same year, she officially entered the Zhanjiang Sports School in Mazhang. Quan later trained at Guangzhou Sports Vocational and Technical College in 2018.

In March 2018, Quan joined the Guangdong provincial team and was coached by He Weiyi.

In October 2020, at age 13, she won the National Diving Championship in the 10 metre platform event. She was encouraged by her coach to participate and had learned all the moves in the three weeks leading up to the competition. In the same month, she joined the national diving team.

At the 2020 Summer Olympics in Tokyo, Quan was the youngest athlete in the Chinese delegation. On 5 August 2021, she won the gold medal in the individual 10 metre platform event with an overall score of 466.20 points, also breaking the previous Olympic record of 447.70 set by Chen Ruolin during the 2008 Summer Olympics. Of her five dives, three were perfect dives, two of which earned straight scores of 10 from all seven judges.

At the 2021 National Games of China, Quan won gold in the team event representing Guangdong. She scored a 413.90 on the 10 metre platform, leading a field that included Olympic teammates Chen Yuxi and Zhang Jiaqi.

In December 2021, Quan participated in the Diving Exhibition Competition held in conjunction with the 2021 FINA World Short Course Swimming Championships in Abu Dhabi. Unlike many diving events, athletes dived into open water instead of a pool. The Chinese team consisted of Wang Han, Lian Junjie, Li Zheng, and Quan. She performed in two rounds of the 10 metre platform, including an individual dive scoring 79.50 points and a mixed synchronized dive with Li Zheng, together scoring 86.40 points. She helped Team China win third place with 384.20 points in total.

In the summer of 2022, Quan participated in the 2022 World Aquatics Championships, winning two gold medals in the 10 metre synchronized platform with Chen Yuxi and the mixed team event with Bai Yuming. She also placed second in the 10 metre platform, while her teammate Chen Yuxi was the champion.

In 2023, at the 2022 Asian Games in Hangzhou, Quan won gold in the 10 metre platform and another gold with Chen in the 10 metre synchronized platform.

At the 2024 Summer Olympics in Paris, Quan won gold with Chen in the 10 metre synchronized platform. Quan also defended her gold medal in the women's 10 metre platform with a perfect opening dive.

== Awards and honours ==
- FINA, Top 10 Moments: 2020 Summer Olympics (#10 for being the second youngest diver competing representing China at the Olympic Games to win a gold medal when she was just 14 years, 130 days old)
- On 9 August 2021, the Chinese Communist Youth League and the All-China Youth Federation awarded 39 young athletes, including Quan, the China Youth May Fourth Medal (China Youth Wusi Medal).
- On 31 August 2021, the Guangdong Federation of Trade Unions awarded Quan and 11 other Olympic athletes the Guangdong May Day Labor Medal.
- On 5 September 2021, Quan was awarded the All-China Federation of Trade Unions's National May Day Labor Medal.
- On 6 September 2021, the Guangdong Committee of the Communist Youth League and the Guangdong Youth Federation decided to award Quan and 12 other athletes the Guangdong Youth May Fourth Medal.

== Personal life ==
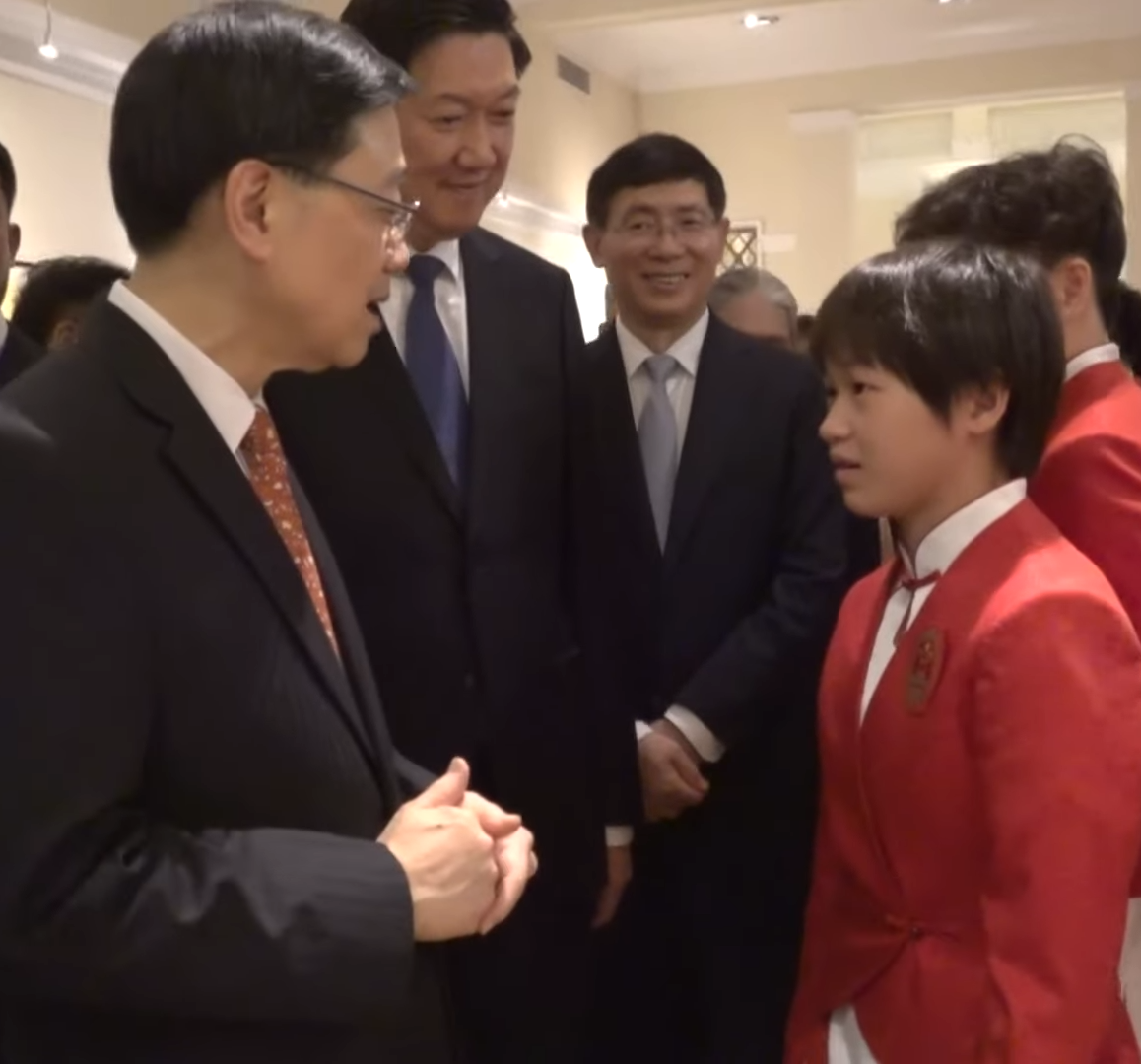
Quan meeting Chief Executive of Hong Kong John Lee Ka-chiu during the Chinese medalists of 2024 Summer Olympics' visit to Hong Kong (2024)

Quan has mentioned making more money to treat her mother's illness as a motivation. Her mother was hit by a car on the way to work in 2017 and suffered a serious injury. She mentioned her mother was hospitalized several times but her family did not tell her because they did not want her to worry while training.

Quan enjoys playing video games in her free time, particularly PUBG and Honor of Kings. She enjoys eating spicy snacks and playing claw machine arcade games, and she has a dream of owning a supermarket in her hometown.

In a 2026 interview, Quan revealed that she had been the target of cyberbullying regarding her body as she reached adulthood. She stated that negative online comments about her weight caused psychological distress and affected her confidence, leading to increased anxiety about her appearance and athletic performance. She added that she is working to cope with the pressure and remains focused on her training and competitive goals.

== Other activities ==
On the first through third of October 2021, the featured TV program Quan's Tour was broadcast on the Guangdong Sports Channel for the Chinese holiday National Day. This TV program shows Quan and her teammates visiting the Chimelong Safari Park, Chimelong Paradise and Chimelong Ocean Kingdom, where Quan watched the animal circus, rode roller coasters, and played with crane catchers. Quan's trip to the theme parks also satisfied her wish to visit and play in the amusement park and the zoo.

In October 2021, Quan participated in Beijing 2022 Winter Olympic Games countdown 100 days theme activities hosted by CCTV, where she performed "Together to the Future" and "See You in Beijing" with many Olympic champions and celebrities. On 26 December, the music video of "See You in Beijing" sung by 55 Olympic champions, including Quan, was released.
