= Ciara McGing =

Irish diver

Personal information
- Nationality: Irish
- Born: 3 March 2001 (age 25) London

Sport
- Country: (Republic of Ireland) Ireland
- Sport: Diving
- Event: Women's 10m Platform
- College team: (United States) Ohio State University (2020-2024)

Ciara McGing (born 3 March 2001) is a former Irish Olympic diver. She competed for Ireland at the Paris 2024 Olympics in the 10 metre platform.

She announced her retirement from competitive diving in April 2025

McGing was born in London and moved to Dublin at age 16 to train with Swim Ireland's elite diving squad for three years before joining Ohio State University in 2020.

McGing has grandparents from Killawalla and Toormakeady, County Mayo.
