= Else Praasterink =

Dutch diver (born 2003)

Personal information
- Full name: Else Guurtje Praasterink
- Nationality: Dutch
- Born: March 10, 2003 (age 23)
- Education: University of Louisville

Sport
- Sport: diving
Medal record
Women's diving
Representing the Netherlands
European Aquatics Championships
Bronze medal – third place	2026 Paris	10 m platform
European Diving Championships
Bronze medal – third place	2025 Antalya	10 m platform

Else Guurtje Praasterink (10 March 2003) is a Dutch diver. She placed 11th at the 2024 World Aquatics Championships in the 10 metre platform event and finished 12th at the 2024 Summer Olympics. Praasterink won bronze medals at the 2025 European Diving and 2026 European Aquatic Championships.

== Career ==
Praasterink wanted to become a competitive swimmer but because of her small size she was guided to become a diver from the 10 metre platform. As a junior she was based in Eindhoven. She placed 8th at the 2019 Junior European Championships.

Praasterink enrolled at the University of Louisville to study biology and join the diving team of the Louisville Cardinals. In her senior year, she placed 4th at the 2024 NCAA Division 1 finals.

At the 2022 World Aquatics Championship, Praasterink reached 11th in the 10-metre platform finals. Two years later she achieved the same spot, which qualified her for the 2024 Summer Olympics. At the Olympics, Praasterink reached the final and placed 12th.

In the fall of 2024, Praasterink joined the Swimming Team at Texas A&M Aggies while pursuing a master's degree in rangeland, wildlife and fisheries management.

Praasterink won the bronze medal of the 10 metre platform event at the 2025 European Diving Championships in Antalya, her first medal at an international championship. One year later she obtained bronze in the 10 metre platform event at the 2026 European Aquatics Championships in Paris.
