= Jessica Parratto =

American diver

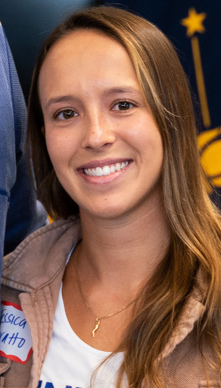
- Parratto in 2021

Personal information
- Born: June 26, 1994 (age 32) Dover, New Hampshire, U.S.
- Height: 5 ft 2 in (157 cm)
- Weight: 113 lb (51 kg)

Sport
- Sport: Platform Diving
- Events: 10m, 10m Synchro
- College team: Indiana University
- Coached by: Drew Johansen
Medal record
Women's diving
Representing United States
Olympic Games
Silver medal – second place	2020 Tokyo	10 meter Synchro
World Championships
Bronze medal – third place	2023 Fukuoka	10 m synchro

Jessica Parratto (/pəˈrɑːtoʊ/ pə-RAH-toh; born June 26, 1994) is an American diver.

Jessica Parratto is a twelve-time USA Diving National Champion in women's platform and platform synchro. At the age of 17 she competed at her first world event, the 2015 World Aquatics Championships. Parratto placed 10th in the Women's 10m Platform at the 2016 Summer Olympics in Rio. She competed at the 2020 Summer Olympics in the Women's Synchronized Platform with partner Delaney Schnell, placing second and winning the first ever Olympic medal for the United States in that event.

== Early life ==
Daughter of Mike and Amy Parratto, Jessica and her sister Melissa grew up in Dover, New Hampshire. Her father Mike coached Olympic swimmer Jenny Thompson, one of the most decorated female Olympians of all time with 12 Olympic medals, 8 of which are gold. Her mother Amy was a five-time All American diver at Wellesley College and coached Jessica until the age of 14.

== Diving career ==
=== 2016 Summer Olympics ===
Parratto's Olympic debut was at the 2016 Summer Olympics in Rio de Janeiro. In the individual 10 meter platform event Parratto placed 10th with a score of 334.60 points. In the synchronized 10 meter platform dive event Parratto and her partner Amy Cozad took 7th place with a score of 301.02 points.

=== NCAA National Championships ===
Parratto was the NCAA champion in 10m diving in 2015. She won with a score of 367.00 which was almost 30 points ahead of the runner up. She also competed in the 1m and 3m events. She placed 13th in the 1m event and tied for 7th in the 3m event.

=== 2020 Summer Olympics ===
Parratto then competed in the Synchronized Women's 10 meter event with Delaney Schnell, winning the silver medal. Parratto and Schnell won the first ever Olympic medal in the event for the United States, and they matched their best U.S result in any Olympic women’s diving event since Laura Wilkinson’s individual platform gold in 2000.

== Major competition results ==
Summer Olympics

- 2nd synchro 10m 2020 Summer Olympics
- 7th synchro 10m 2016 Summer Olympics
- 10th 10m 2016 Rio Summer Olympics
- World Championships
- 9th synchro 10m 2015 FINA World Championships

World Series

- 7th synchro 10m 2014 FINA Diving World Series Beijing
- 6th synchro 10m 2014 FINA Diving World Series London
- 9th 10m 2014 FINA Diving World Series

World Cup

- 4th synchro 10m 2016 FINA Diving World Cup
- 8th synchro 10m 2010 FINA Canada Cup

Grand Prix

- 2nd synchro 3m 2015 FINA Puerto Rico Grand Prix
- 3rd synchro 10m 2015 FINA Grand Prix Australia
- 4th synchro 10m 2015 FINA Puerto Rico Grand Prix
- 9th 10m 2015 FINA Grand Prix Australia
- 4th synchro 10m 2014 FINA Grand Prix Mexico
- 4th 10m 2014 FINA Grand Prix Mexico
- 4th synchro 10m 2012 International Springertag FINA Grand Prix
- 4th synchro 10m 2011 AT&T USA Diving Grand Prix
- 6th 10m 2011 AT&T USA Diving Grand Prix

== See also ==
- United States at the 2015 World Aquatics Championships
