= Emily Hallifax =

French diver (born 2005)

Personal information
- Born: 9 December 2005 (age 20) Nice, France

Sport
- Country: France
- Sport: Diving

Emily Hallifax (born 9 December 2005 in Nice) is a French athlete who competes in platform diving. She won two medals at the 2024 European Swimming Championships; silver in the 10 m platform and bronze in the 10 m synchro platform.

== Education ==
She attends Auburn University.

== Career ==
In her youth, Emily Hallifax first practiced high-level gymnastics, first in artistic gymnastics then acrobatic. She discovered diving at the age of 16 during the confinement period. For her first participation in the French Championships, she won a silver medal in the junior category and then joined INSEP.

In 2023, she was French vice-champion in the individual 10m and she finished tenth in the 2023 World Aquatics Championships in the 10m synchro with her partner Jade Gillet.

In 2024, she won the silver medal at the 2024 European Aquatics Championships in the individual 10-metre event, tied with Ukrainian diver Sofiya Lyskun, and added a bronze medal in synchronized diving with Jade Gillet.

She came in eighth at the 2024 Summer Olympics. She competed with Jade Gillet.

== Awards ==
European Championship
Year	Place	Medal	Type
2024	Belgrade (Serbia)	Silver	Platform 10 m
2024	Belgrade (Serbia)	Bronze	10 m synchro platform
