= Kim Mi-rae =

North Korean diver (born 2001)

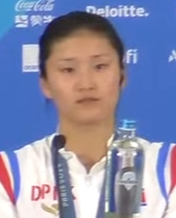
- Kim in 2024

Personal information
- Native name: 김미래
- Nationality: North Korean
- Born: 7 April 2001 (age 25) Pyongyang, North Korea

Sport
- Country: North Korea
- Sport: Diving
Medal record
Women's diving
Representing North Korea
Olympic Games
Silver medal – second place	2024 Paris	10 m synchro
Bronze medal – third place	2024 Paris	10 m platform
World Championships
Silver medal – second place	2017 Budapest	10 m synchro
Silver medal – second place	2024 Doha	10 m synchro
Bronze medal – third place	2017 Budapest	10 m mixed synchro
Asian Games
Silver medal – second place	2018 Jakarta	10 m synchro
Silver medal – second place	2026 Aichi-Nagoya	10 m synchro
Bronze medal – third place	2018 Jakarta	10 m platform

Kim Mi-rae (Korean pronunciation: [kim.mi.ɾɛ]; born 7 April 2001) is a North Korean diver. She won the silver medal in the women's synchronized 10 metre platform and the bronze medal in the women's 10 metre platform at the Paris 2024 Olympics.

At the 2016 Summer Olympics, Kim was placed 4th in the women's synchronized ten metre platform with her partner Kim Kuk-hyang.

At the Paris 2024 Olympics, she won the silver medal with her partner Jo Jin-mi in the women's synchronized 10 metre platform event, marking North Korea's first-ever diving Olympic medal. She also secured the bronze medal in the women's 10 metre platform with a score of 372.10.
