= Chen Yuxi =

Chinese diver (born 2005)

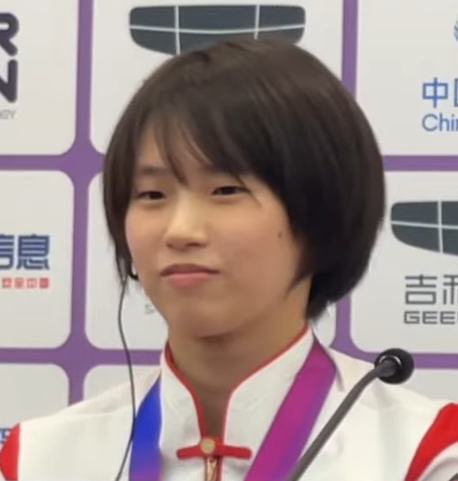
- Chen in 2023

Personal information
- Native name: 陈芋汐
- Nationality: Chinese
- Born: 11 September 2005 (age 21) Shanghai, China

Sport
- Country: China
- Sport: Diving
- Events: 10 metre platform and synchronized platform
Medal record
Women's diving
Representing China
Olympic Games
Gold medal – first place	2020 Tokyo	10 m synchro
Gold medal – first place	2024 Paris	10 m synchro
Silver medal – second place	2020 Tokyo	10 m platform
Silver medal – second place	2024 Paris	10 m platform
World Championships
Gold medal – first place	2019 Gwangju	10 m platform
Gold medal – first place	2022 Budapest	10 m synchro
Gold medal – first place	2022 Budapest	10 m platform
Gold medal – first place	2023 Fukuoka	10 m platform
Gold medal – first place	2023 Fukuoka	10 m synchro
Gold medal – first place	2024 Doha	10 m synchro
Gold medal – first place	2025 Singapore	Team
Gold medal – first place	2025 Singapore	10 m synchro
Gold medal – first place	2025 Singapore	10 m platform
Silver medal – second place	2024 Doha	10 m platform
Asian Games
Gold medal – first place	2022 Hangzhou	10 m synchro
Gold medal – first place	2026 Aichi−Nagoya	10 m platform
Gold medal – first place	2026 Aichi−Nagoya	10 m synchro
Silver medal – second place	2022 Hangzhou	10 m platform

Chen Yuxi (simplified Chinese: 陈芋汐; traditional Chinese: 陳芋汐; 11 September 2005) is a Chinese diver, national champion, and Olympic champion. At the 2020 Summer Olympics, she won the gold medal with partner Zhang Jiaqi in the women's 10m synchronized platform. Chen also won the silver medal in the individual 10-metre platform event. At the 2024 Summer Olympics, Chen, alongside teammate Quan Hongchan, won gold in the women's 10m synchronized platform.

== Early life ==
Chen was born on 11 September 2005 to a family with gymnastics background. Her grandfather, Chen Xinxi, was a former gymnast. Her father, Chen Jian, is a gymnastics coach at the Shanghai Youth Sports School in Xuhui District, and her mother, Dong Chunhua, is an associate professor in the gymnastics teaching and research section at the Shanghai University of Sport.

== Career ==
In 2008, she began to practice gymnastics and in 2011, she was selected by Shanghai diving team leader Shi Meiqin to practice diving. In early 2017, Chen entered the Shanghai diving team for training.

In September 2018, Chen won the women's single 10 metre platform diving championship and mixed 10 metre synchronized platform (with Yu Duan) at the National Diving Championships in Chongqing. In March 2019, she was selected for the Chinese National Diving Team. In May, she participated in the 10th FINA Diving World Series and won gold in the 10 metre platform and 10 metre synchronized platform (with Yuan Haoyan).

On 1 July 2019, Chen was selected to be in the Chinese diving team for the 18th FINA World Aquatics Championships in Gwangju. At the event, she won a gold medal in the 10 metre platform with 439 points. On 24 September, at the National Diving Championships in Yantai, Chen won the 10 metre platform with 428.85 points. Chen and partner Zhang Jiaqi won the 10 metre synchronized platform with 342.54 points.

At the 2020 Summer Olympics in Tokyo, Chen and Zhang won the gold medal in the 10 metre synchronized platform on 27 July 2021. On 5 August, Chen won the silver medal in the 10 metre platform.

At the 2021 National Games of China in Shaanxi, Chen and Zhang won gold in the 10 metre synchronized platform on 9 September. On 12 September, Chen won silver in the 10 metre platform, losing to compatriot Quan Hongchan.

On May 28, 2022, in a test match of the Chinese diving team, Chen and Quan scored 369.24 points, setting the highest score since the two were paired.

At the 2022 World Aquatics Championships in Budapest, Chen took part in the 10 metre platform as the defending champion. She won the gold medal again with a score of 417.25, finishing ahead of teammate Quan, who had a score of 416.95. Chen and Quan also won gold in the 10 metre synchronized platform.

In 2023, at the 2022 Asian Games in Hangzhou, Chen won silver in the 10 metre platform and gold with Quan in 10 metre synchronized platform.

At the 2024 Summer Olympics, Chen, alongside her teammate Quan, won gold in the 10 metre synchronized platform. Chen also secured the silver medal in the women's 10 metre platform with a score of 420.70, less than 5 points behind gold medalist and compatriot Quan.

== Awards and honors ==
- China Youth May Fourth Medal (9 August 2021)
- National 1 May Labour Medal (September 2021)
- Advanced Worker of National Sports System (24 September 2021)
- World Aquatics 2025 Female Diving Athlete of the Year

== Other activities ==
On 21 September 2021, Chen participated in Dragon TV show 'Moon in the East – Mid-Autumn Dream Night', where she sang the song "One Hundred Years" with Liao Changyong, Huang Baomei and Huang Xuechen.

On 26 December 2021, the music video for 2022 Winter Olympics "See You in Beijing" sung by 55 Olympic champions, including Chen Yuxi, was released.
