= Matsuri Arai =

Japanese diver (born 2001)

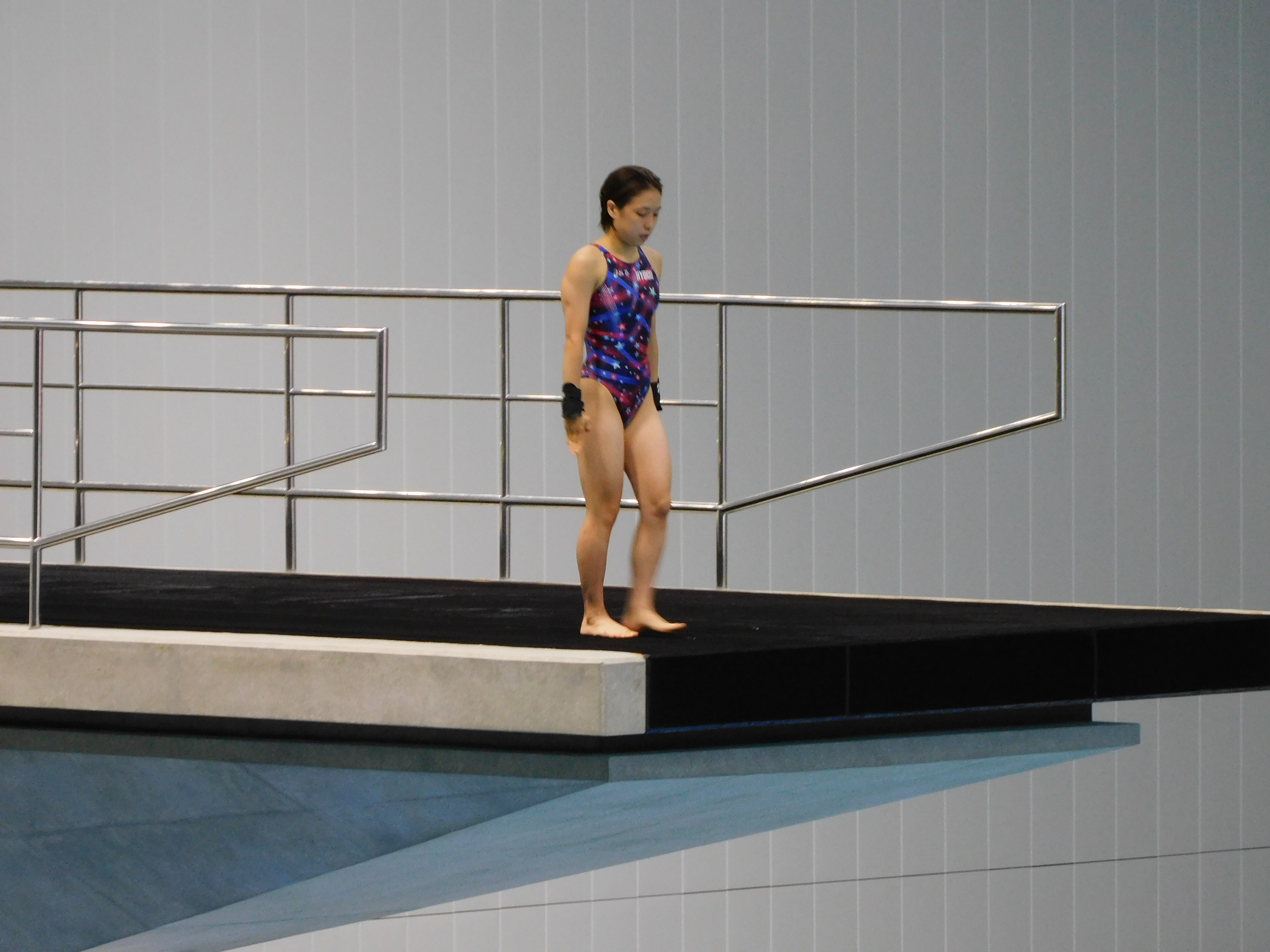

Personal information
- Nationality: Japanese
- Born: 18 January 2001 (age 25) Itami, Japan

Sport
- Sport: Diving
Medal record
Representing Japan
Asian Games
Silver medal – second place	2022 Hangzhou	10 m synchro

Matsuri Arai (荒井 祭里, Arai Matsuri; born 18 January 2001) is a Japanese diver. She competed in the women's 10 metre platform event at the 2019 World Aquatics Championships. She represented Japan at the 2020 Summer Olympics in Tokyo, Japan. She competed in the women's synchronized 10 metre platform and women's 10 metre platform events.

In 2023, at the 2022 Asian Games in Hangzhou, China, Arai won silver with Minami Itahashi in 10 metre synchro.

Arai competed for Japan at the 2024 Summer Olympics in Paris, France, where she finished ninth in the women's 10 metre platform event with a total score of 314.45 points.
