= Kate Miller (diver) =

Canadian diver (born 2005)

Personal information
- Born: May 27, 2005 (age 21) Ottawa, Ontario, Canada

Sport
- Sport: Diving
Medal record
Women's Diving
Representing Canada
Pan American Games
Silver medal – second place	2023 Santiago	10 m synchro
World Junior Diving Championships
Gold medal – first place	2022 Montreal	3m springboard A/B
Junior Pan American Games
Gold medal – first place	2025 Asunción	10 m synchro

Kate Miller (born May 27, 2005) is a Canadian diver.

== Career ==
Miller teamed up with Caeli McKay in May 2023 to compete in the women's synchronized 10 metre platform. In August 2023, Miller was named to Canada's 2023 Pan American Games team. At the Games, Miller won the silver medal in the women's synchronized 10 metre platform event. In July 2024, Miller qualified to compete for Canada at the 2024 Summer Olympics.
