= Jo Jin-mi =

North Korean diver (born 2004)

Personal information
- Nationality: North Korean
- Born: 15 November 2004 (age 21)

Sport
- Country: North Korea
- Sport: Diving
Medal record
Women's diving
Representing North Korea
Olympic Games
| Silver medal – second place | 2024 Paris | 10 m synchro |
World Championships
| Silver medal – second place | 2024 Doha | 10 m synchro |
| Silver medal – second place | 2024 Doha | 10 m mixed synchro |
| Silver medal – second place | 2025 Singapore | 10 m mixed synchro |
| Bronze medal – third place | 2025 Singapore | 10 m synchro |
Asian Games
| Silver medal – second place | 2026 Aichi-Nagoya | 10 m synchro |

Jo Jin-mi (Korean: 조진미; born 15 November 2004) is a North Korean diver and Olympic medalist. She won silver with partner Kim Mi-rae in the women's synchronized 10 metre platform event at the 2024 Summer Olympics, North Korea's first-ever diving Olympic medal.
