= List of divers at the 2020 Summer Olympics =

This is a list of the divers who will be participating at the 2020 Summer Olympics in Tokyo, Japan from 25 July to 7 August 2021. 147 divers are set to compete in the Games across 8 events.

== Male divers ==
NOC	Name	Age	Birthplace/Hometown	Events
Australia	Li Shixin	12 February 1988 (aged 33)	(China) Maoming, Guangdong	3 metre springboard
Australia	Cassiel Rousseau	4 February 2001 (aged 20)	(Australia) South Brisbane, Queensland	10 metre platform
Australia	Sam Fricker	4 May 2002 (aged 19)	(Australia) Sydney, New South Wales	10 metre platform
Brazil	Isaac Souza	23 June 1999 (aged 22)	(Brazil) Rio de Janeiro, Rio de Janeiro	10 metre platform
Brazil	Kawan Pereira	17 June 2002 (aged 19)	(Brazil) Parnaíba, Piauí	10 metre platform
Canada	Cédric Fofana	15 September 2003 (aged 17)	(Canada) Montreal, Quebec	3 metre springboard
Canada	Nathan Zsombor-Murray	28 April 2003 (aged 18)	(Canada) Montreal, Quebec	10 metre platform Synchronized 10 metre platform
Canada	Rylan Wiens	2 January 2002 (aged 19)	(Canada) Calgary, Alberta	10 metre platform
Canada	Vincent Riendeau	13 December 1996 (aged 24)	(Canada) Montreal, Quebec	Synchronized 10 metre platform
China	Xie Siyi	28 March 1996 (aged 25)	(China) Shantou, Guangdong	3 metre springboard Synchronized 3 metre springboard
China	Wang Zongyuan	24 August 2001 (aged 19)	(China)	3 metre springboard Synchronized 3 metre springboard
China	Cao Yuan	7 February 1995 (aged 26)	(China) Changsha	10 metre platform Synchronized 10 metre platform
China	Yang Jian	10 June 1994 (aged 27)	(China) Sichuan	10 metre platform
China	Chen Aisen	22 October 1995 (aged 25)	(China) Guangzhou	Synchronized 10 metre platform
Colombia	Sebastián Morales	22 August 1994 (aged 26)	(Colombia) Medellín	3 metre springboard
Colombia	Daniel Restrepo	22 March 2000 (aged 21)	(Colombia) Antioquia	3 metre springboard
Colombia	Sebastián Villa	21 February 1992 (aged 29)	(Colombia) Medellín	10 metre platform
Dominican Republic	Jonathan Ruvalcaba	1 March 1991 (aged 30)	Mexico City	3 metre springboard
Egypt	Mohab El-Kordy	21 March 1997 (aged 24)	(Egypt) Cairo	3 metre springboard 10 metre platform
France	Alexis Jandard	23 April 1997 (aged 24)	(France) Écully	3 metre springboard
France	Matthieu Rosset	26 May 1990 (aged 31)	(France) Lyon	10 metre platform
Germany	Martin Wolfram	29 January 1992 (aged 29)	(Germany) Dresden	3 metre springboard
Germany	Patrick Hausding	9 March 1989 (aged 32)	(Germany) Berlin	3 metre springboard Synchronized 3 metre springboard
Germany	Lars Rüdiger	17 April 1996 (aged 25)	(Germany) Berlin	Synchronized 3 metre springboard
Germany	Jaden Eikermann	14 February 2005 (aged 16)	(Germany)	10 metre platform
Germany	Timo Barthel	3 April 1996 (aged 25)	(Germany) Würselen, North Rhine-Westphalia	10 metre platform
Great Britain	Jack Laugher	30 January 1995 (aged 26)	(United Kingdom) Harrogate, North Yorkshire	3 metre springboard Synchronized 3 metre springboard
Great Britain	James Heatly	20 May 1997 (aged 24)	(United Kingdom) Winchester, Hampshire	3 metre springboard
Great Britain	Daniel Goodfellow	19 October 1996 (aged 24)	(United Kingdom) Cambridge	Synchronized 3 metre springboard
Great Britain	Tom Daley	21 May 1994 (aged 27)	(United Kingdom) Plymouth, Devon	10 metre platform Synchronized 10 metre platform
Great Britain	Noah Williams	15 May 2000 (aged 21)	(United Kingdom) Hoxton, Hackney	10 metre platform
Great Britain	Matty Lee	5 March 1998 (aged 23)	(United Kingdom) Leeds, West Yorkshire	Synchronized 10 metre platform
Ireland	Oliver Dingley	24 November 1992 (aged 28)	(United Kingdom) Harrogate, North Yorkshire	3 metre springboard
Italy	Lorenzo Marsaglia	16 November 1996 (aged 24)	(Italy) Rome	3 metre springboard Synchronized 3 metre springboard
Italy	Giovanni Tocci	31 August 1994 (aged 26)	(Italy) Cosenza	Synchronized 3 metre springboard
Jamaica	Yona Knight-Wisdom	12 May 1995 (aged 26)	(United Kingdom) Leeds	3 metre springboard
Japan	Ken Terauchi	7 August 1980 (aged 40)	(Japan) Takarazuka, Hyōgo	3 metre springboard Synchronized 3 metre springboard
Japan	Sho Sakai	22 August 1992 (aged 28)	(Japan) Sagamihara, Kanagawa	Synchronized 3 metre springboard
Japan	Reo Nishida	16 July 2000 (aged 21)	(Japan) Shibuya, Tokyo	10 metre platform
Japan	Rikuto Tamai	11 September 2006 (aged 14)	(Japan)	10 metre platform
Japan	Hiroki Ito	26 October 1999 (aged 21)	(Japan)	Synchronized 10 metre platform
Japan	Kazuki Murakami	19 May 1989 (aged 32)	(Japan) Ehime	Synchronized 10 metre platform
Mexico	Osmar Olvera	5 June 2004 (aged 17)	(Mexico) Jalisco	3 metre springboard
Mexico	Rommel Pacheco	12 July 1986 (aged 35)	(Mexico) Mérida, Yucatán	3 metre springboard
Mexico	Yahel Castillo	16 June 1987 (aged 34)	(Mexico) Guadalajara, Jalisco	Synchronized 3 metre springboard
Mexico	Juan Celaya	14 February 1992 (aged 29)	(Mexico) San Nicolás de los Garza	Synchronized 3 metre springboard
Mexico	Andrés Villarreal	22 October 1996 (aged 24)	(Mexico) Nuevo León	10 metre platform
Mexico	Iván García	25 October 1993 (aged 27)	(Mexico) Guadalajara	10 metre platform
Mexico	Diego Balleza	27 November 1994 (aged 26)	(Mexico)	Synchronized 10 metre platform
Mexico	Kevin Berlín	25 April 2001 (aged 20)	(Mexico) Veracruz	Synchronized 10 metre platform
New Zealand	Anton Down-Jenkins	6 September 1999 (aged 21)	(New Zealand) Wellington	3 metre springboard
Puerto Rico	Rafael Quintero	24 July 1994 (aged 26)	(Puerto Rico) Canóvanas	10 metre platform
ROC	Nikita Shleikher	10 June 1998 (aged 23)	(Russia) Stavropol, Stavropol Krai	3 metre springboard Synchronized 3 metre springboard
ROC	Evgeny Kuznetsov	12 April 1990 (aged 31)	(Russia) Stavropol, Stavropol Krai	3 metre springboard Synchronized 3 metre springboard
ROC	Viktor Minibaev	18 July 1991 (aged 30)	(Russia) Moscow	10 metre platform Synchronized 10 metre platform
ROC	Aleksandr Bondar	25 October 1993 (aged 27)	(Ukraine) Luhansk	10 metre platform Synchronized 10 metre platform
Singapore	Jonathan Chan	8 February 1995 (aged 26)	(Singapore)	10 metre platform
Spain	Alberto Arévalo	8 February 1995 (aged 26)	(Spain)	3 metre springboard
Spain	Nicolás García	20 June 1995 (aged 26)	(Spain) Las Palmas	3 metre springboard
South Korea	Woo Ha-ram	21 March 1998 (aged 23)	(South Korea) Busan	3 metre springboard 10 metre platform Synchronized 10 metre platform
South Korea	Kim Yeong-nam	29 January 1996 (aged 25)	(South Korea)	3 metre springboard Synchronized 10 metre platform
South Korea	Kim Yeong-taek	24 August 2001 (aged 19)	(South Korea)	10 metre platform
Ukraine	Oleh Kolodiy	16 March 1993 (aged 28)	(Ukraine) Mykolaiv	3 metre springboard
Ukraine	Oleksiy Sereda	25 December 2005 (aged 15)	(Ukraine) Mykolaiv	10 metre platform Synchronized 10 metre platform
Ukraine	Oleh Serbin	11 August 2001 (aged 19)	(Ukraine) Zaporizhia	Synchronized 10 metre platform
United States	Andrew Capobianco	13 October 1999 (aged 21)	(United States) Mineola, New York	3 metre springboard Synchronized 3 metre springboard
United States	Tyler Downs	19 July 2003 (aged 18)	(United States) Ballwin, St. Louis	3 metre springboard
United States	Michael Hixon	16 July 1994 (aged 27)	(United States) Amherst, Massachusetts	Synchronized 3 metre springboard
United States	Brandon Loschiavo	31 May 1997 (aged 24)	(United States) Huntington Beach, California	10 metre platform
United States	Jordan Windle	13 November 1998 (aged 22)	Sihanoukville, Cambodia	10 metre platform
Venezuela	Óscar Ariza	25 September 1999 (aged 21)	(Venezuela)	10 metre platform

== Female divers ==
NOC	Name	Age	Birthplace/Hometown	Events
Australia	Esther Qin	18 November 1991 (aged 29)	(China) Liuzhou, Guangxi	3 metre springboard
Australia	Anabelle Smith	3 February 1993 (aged 28)	(Australia) Malvern, Victoria	3 metre springboard
Australia	Melissa Wu	3 May 1992 (aged 29)	(Australia) Sydney, New South Wales	10 metre platform
Australia	Nikita Hains	2 November 2000 (aged 20)	(Australia)	10 metre platform
Brazil	Luana Lira	5 March 1996 (aged 25)	(Brazil) João Pessoa	3 metre springboard
Brazil	Ingrid Oliveira	7 May 1996 (aged 25)	(Brazil) Rio de Janeiro	10 metre platform
Canada	Jennifer Abel	23 August 1991 (aged 29)	(Canada) Montreal, Quebec	3 metre springboard Synchronized 3 metre springboard
Canada	Pamela Ware	12 February 1993 (aged 28)	(Canada) Longueuil, Quebec	3 metre springboard
Canada	Mélissa Citrini-Beaulieu	12 June 1995 (aged 26)	(Canada) Saint Constant, Quebec	Synchronized 3 metre springboard
Canada	Celina Toth	20 March 1992 (aged 29)	(Canada) St.Thomas, Ontario	10 metre platform
Canada	Meaghan Benfeito	2 March 1989 (aged 32)	(Canada) Montreal, Quebec	10 metre platform Synchronized 10 metre platform
Canada	Caeli McKay	25 June 1999 (aged 22)	(Canada) Calgary, Alberta	Synchronized 10 metre platform
China	Shi Tingmao	31 August 1991 (aged 29)	(China) Chongqing	3 metre springboard Synchronized 3 metre springboard
China	Wang Han	24 January 1991 (aged 30)	(China) Hebei	3 metre springboard Synchronized 3 metre springboard
China	Chen Yuxi	11 September 2005 (aged 15)	(China) Shanghai	10 metre platform Synchronized 10 metre platform
China	Quan Hongchan	28 March 2007 (aged 14)	(China) Zhanjiang, Guangdong	10 metre platform
China	Zhang Jiaqi	28 May 2004 (aged 17)	(China) Shenyang, Liaoning	Synchronized 10 metre platform
Egypt	Maha Gouda	8 June 1998 (aged 23)	(Egypt) Alexandria	10 metre platform
France	Alaïs Kalonji	11 December 1997 (aged 23)	(France) Rennes	10 metre platform
Germany	Tina Punzel	1 August 1995 (aged 25)	(Germany) Dresden	3 metre springboard Synchronized 3 metre springboard Synchronized 10 metre platform
Germany	Lena Hentschel	17 June 2001 (aged 20)	(Germany)	Synchronized 3 metre springboard
Germany	Christina Wassen	12 January 1999 (aged 22)	(Germany) Eschweiler	10 metre platform Synchronized 10 metre platform
Germany	Elena Wassen	1 November 2000 (aged 20)	(Germany) Eschweiler	10 metre platform
Great Britain	Scarlett Mew Jensen	31 December 2001 (aged 19)	(United Kingdom) London	3 metre springboard
Great Britain	Grace Reid	9 May 1996 (aged 25)	(United Kingdom) (Scotland) Edinburgh	3 metre springboard Synchronized 3 metre springboard
Great Britain	Katherine Torrance	10 October 1998 (aged 22)	(United Kingdom) Croydon	Synchronized 3 metre springboard
Great Britain	Lois Toulson	26 September 1999 (aged 21)	(United Kingdom) Huddersfield	10 metre platform Synchronized 10 metre platform
Great Britain	Andrea Spendolini-Sirieix	11 September 2004 (aged 16)	(United Kingdom) London	10 metre platform
Great Britain	Eden Cheng	2 December 2002 (aged 18)	(United Kingdom)	Synchronized 10 metre platform
Ireland	Tanya Watson	24 December 2001 (aged 19)	(Republic of Ireland)	10 metre platform
Italy	Noemi Batki	12 October 1987 (aged 33)	(Hungary) Budapest	10 metre platform
Italy	Sarah Jodoin Di Maria	3 January 2000 (aged 21)	(Canada) Montreal, Quebec	10 metre platform
Italy	Elena Bertocchi	19 September 1994 (aged 26)	(Italy) Milan	Synchronized 3 metre springboard
Italy	Chiara Pellacani	12 September 2002 (aged 18)	(Italy) Rome	Synchronized 3 metre springboard
Japan	Haruka Enomoto	14 September 1996 (aged 24)	(Japan)	3 metre springboard Synchronized 3 metre springboard
Japan	Sayaka Mikami	8 December 2000 (aged 20)	(Japan) Yonago	3 metre springboard
Japan	Hazuki Miyamoto	8 December 2000 (aged 20)	(Japan)	Synchronized 3 metre springboard
Japan	Matsuri Arai	18 January 2001 (aged 20)	(Japan) Itami	10 metre platform Synchronized 10 metre platform
Japan	Minami Itahashi	28 January 2000 (aged 21)	(Japan) Takarazuka, Hyōgo	Synchronized 10 metre platform
Malaysia	Ng Yan Yee	11 July 1993 (aged 28)	(Malaysia) Kuala Lumpur	3 metre springboard
Malaysia	Nur Dhabitah Sabri	12 July 1999 (aged 22)	(Malaysia) Kuala Lumpur	3 metre springboard
Malaysia	Cheong Jun Hoong	16 April 1990 (aged 31)	(Malaysia) Ipoh, Perak	10 metre platform
Malaysia	Pandelela Rinong	2 March 1993 (aged 28)	(Malaysia) Bau, Sarawak	10 metre platform Synchronized 10 metre platform
Malaysia	Leong Mun Yee	4 December 1984 (aged 36)	(Malaysia) Ipoh, Perak	Synchronized 10 metre platform
Mexico	Aranza Vázquez	12 August 2002 (aged 18)	(Mexico) La Paz, Baja California Sur	3 metre springboard
Mexico	Arantxa Chávez	30 January 1991 (aged 30)	Mexico City	3 metre springboard
Mexico	Alejandra Orozco	19 April 1997 (aged 24)	(Mexico) Guadalajara	10 metre platform Synchronized 10 metre platform
Mexico	Gabriela Agúndez	4 August 2000 (aged 20)	(Mexico) La Paz, Baja California Sur	10 metre platform Synchronized 10 metre platform
Mexico	Carolina Mendoza	25 April 1997 (aged 24)	(Mexico) Naucalpan	Synchronized 3 metre springboard
Mexico	Dolores Hernández	21 May 1997 (aged 24)	(Mexico) Veracuz	Synchronized 3 metre springboard
Netherlands	Inge Jansen	2 June 1994 (aged 27)	(Netherlands) Roermond	3 metre springboard
Netherlands	Celine van Duijn	4 November 1992 (aged 28)	(Netherlands) Amersfoort	10 metre platform
Norway	Anne Tuxen	27 February 1998 (aged 23)	(Norway) Stavanger	10 metre platform
ROC	Maria Polyakova	8 May 1997 (aged 24)	(Russia) Moscow	3 metre springboard
ROC	Anna Konanykhina	10 September 2004 (aged 16)	(Russia) Saint Petersburg	10 metre platform
ROC	Yulia Timoshinina	23 January 1998 (aged 23)	(Russia) Moscow	10 metre platform
South Africa	Micaela Bouter	27 October 1995 (aged 25)	(South Africa) Johannesburg	3 metre springboard
South Africa	Julia Vincent	13 August 1994 (aged 26)	(South Africa) Johannesburg	3 metre springboard
Singapore	Freida Lim	7 February 1998 (aged 23)	(Singapore)	10 metre platform
South Korea	Kim Su-ji	16 February 1998 (aged 23)	(South Korea) Ulsan	3 metre springboard
South Korea	Kwon Ha-lim	2 March 1999 (aged 22)	(South Korea) Seoul	10 metre platform
Switzerland	Michelle Heimberg	2 June 2000 (aged 21)	(Switzerland)	3 metre springboard
Sweden	Emma Gullstrand	13 September 2000 (aged 20)	(Sweden) Jönköping	3 metre springboard
Ukraine	Hanna Pysmenska	12 March 1991 (aged 30)	(Ukraine) Vinnytsia	3 metre springboard
Ukraine	Viktoriya Kesar	11 August 1993 (aged 27)	(Ukraine) Zaporizhia	3 metre springboard
Ukraine	Sofiya Lyskun	7 February 2002 (aged 19)	(Ukraine) Luhansk	10 metre platform
United States	Hailey Hernandez	23 March 2003 (aged 18)	(United States) Southlake, Texas	3 metre springboard
United States	Krysta Palmer	13 June 1992 (aged 29)	(United States) Carson City, Nevada	3 metre springboard Synchronized 3 metre springboard
United States	Alison Gibson	9 July 1999 (aged 22)	(United States) Houston, Texas	Synchronized 3 metre springboard
United States	Katrina Young	10 January 1992 (aged 29)	(United States) Shoreline, Washington	10 metre platform
United States	Delaney Schnell	21 December 1998 (aged 22)	(United States) Iron Mountain, Michigan	10 metre platform Synchronized 10 metre platform
United States	Jessica Parratto	26 June 1994 (aged 27)	(United States) Dover, New Hampshire	Synchronized 10 metre platform
