= Diving at the 2020 Summer Olympics =

Diving at the Games of the XXXII Olympiad
- Venue: Tokyo Aquatics Centre
- Dates: 25 July – 7 August 2021
- No. of events: 8
- Competitors: 136 from 30 nations

The diving competitions at the 2020 Summer Olympics in Tokyo featured eight events (postponed to 2021 due to the COVID-19 pandemic). It was one of four aquatic sports at the Games, along with swimming, water polo, and synchronised swimming.

The events were men's and women's versions each of: 3m springboard, synchronised 3m springboard, 10m platform, and synchronised 10m platform.

The diving competitions featured up to 136 athletes. All divers had to be at least 14 years old on or by 31 December 2020.

For the ninth consecutive Games, China dominated the medal table, and for the fifth occasion in that period won gold in all but a single event; in this case, the 10 metre synchronised men's event won by Great Britain's Tom Daley and Matty Lee. This was the second consecutive Games that Great Britain denied China the sweep, after Jack Laugher and Chris Mears denied them in 2016. The United States took third in the medal table, completing a repeat of the top 3 nations from Rio. Again, as in Rio, China, Great Britain and the United States were also the only nations to medal in 3 or more events.

== Qualification ==
A nation can have no more than 16 divers qualify (up to eight males and eight females) and can enter up to two divers in individual events and one pair in synchronized events.

For the individual diving events, qualifiers will be:

- the top 12 finishers in each event from the 2019 World Championships;
- the five continental champions in each event;
- the top 18 from the 2020 FINA Diving World Cup; and
- additional competitors from the 2020 FINA Diving World Cup until the maximum quota is reached.

For the synchronized events (pairs), qualifiers will be:

- the top three finishers in each event from the 2019 World Championships;
- the top four in each event at the 2020 World Cup; and
- the host nation (Japan).

Note: Qualifying spots will go to the nation; they are not tied to the individual diver who achieved the place/finish at the qualifying event. However, an individual diver might only qualify one spot for their nation.

== Participating nations ==
The following nations have won quota places for the diving competitions. Qualification is as yet incomplete.

- Australia (7)
- Brazil (4)
- Canada (10)
- China (16)
- Colombia (3)
- Dominican Republic (1)
- Egypt (3)
- France (3)
- Great Britain (12)
- Germany (7)
- Italy (6)
- Ireland (1)
- Jamaica (1)
- Japan (14)
- Malaysia (5)
- Mexico (14)
- Netherlands (2)
- New Zealand (1)
- Norway (1)
- Puerto Rico (1)
- ROC (11)
- Singapore (2)
- South Africa (2)
- South Korea (5)
- Spain (2)
- Switzerland (1)
- Sweden (1)
- Ukraine (6)
- United States (11)
- Venezuela (1)

== Schedule ==
Legend

H	Heats	SF	Semi-Finals	F	Finals

Date	Jul 25		Jul 26		Jul 27		Jul 28		Jul 29		Jul 30		Jul 31		Aug 1		Aug 2		Aug 3		Aug 4		Aug 5		Aug 6		Aug 7	
Event	M	A	M	A	M	A	M	A	M	A	M	A	M	A	M	A	M	A	M	A	M	A	M	A	M	A	M	A
Men's 3m springboard																		H	SF	F								
Men's 10m platform																										H	SF	F
Men's synchronized 3m springboard								F																				
Men's synchronized 10m platform				F																								
Women's 3m springboard												H		SF		F												
Women's 10m platform																						H	SF	F				
Women's synchronized 3m springboard		F																										
Women's synchronized 10m platform						F																						

== Medalists ==
=== Medal table ===
Rank	NOC	Gold	Silver	Bronze	Total
1	China	7	5	0	12
2	Great Britain	1	0	2	3
3	United States	0	2	1	3
4	Canada	0	1	0	1
5	Germany	0	0	2	2
6	Australia	0	0	1	1
6	Mexico	0	0	1	1
6	ROC	0	0	1	1
Totals (8 entries)		8	8	8	24

=== Men ===
Games	Gold	Silver	Bronze
3 m springboard	Xie Siyi; China	Wang Zongyuan; China	Jack Laugher; Great Britain
10 m platform	Cao Yuan; China	Yang Jian; China	Tom Daley; Great Britain
Synchronized 3 m springboard	China; Xie Siyi; Wang Zongyuan	United States; Andrew Capobianco; Michael Hixon	Germany; Patrick Hausding; Lars Rüdiger
Synchronized 10 m platform	Great Britain; Tom Daley; Matty Lee	China; Cao Yuan; Chen Aisen	ROC; Aleksandr Bondar; Viktor Minibaev

=== Women ===
Games	Gold	Silver	Bronze
3 m springboard	Shi Tingmao; China	Wang Han; China	Krysta Palmer; United States
10 m platform	Quan Hongchan; China	Chen Yuxi; China	Melissa Wu; Australia
Synchronized 3 m springboard	China; Shi Tingmao; Wang Han	Canada; Jennifer Abel; Mélissa Citrini-Beaulieu	Germany; Lena Hentschel; Tina Punzel
Synchronized 10 m platform	China; Chen Yuxi; Zhang Jiaqi	United States; Delaney Schnell; Jessica Parratto	Mexico; Gabriela Agúndez; Alejandra Orozco

== See also ==
- Diving at the 2018 Asian Games
- Diving at the 2018 Commonwealth Games
- Diving at the 2018 Summer Youth Olympics
- Diving at the 2019 Pan American Games
