= 2018 FINA Diving World Series =

International diving competition series

The 2018 FINA Diving World Series, also known as the FINA/CNSG Diving World Series for sponsorship reasons, took place from 9 March to 6 May 2018. It was the tenth edition of the FINA-sanctioned invitational series, and included four events across three continents.

== Calendar ==
The calendar for the 2018 series was announced by FINA in September 2017.

Date	Location
March 9–11	(China) Beijing
March 15–17	(Japan) Fuji
April 27–29	(Canada) Montreal
May 4–6	(Russia) Kazan

== Overall medal table ==
Rank	Nation	Gold	Silver	Bronze	Total
1	China (CHN)	34	13	2	49
2	Canada (CAN)	3	2	8	13
3	Russia (RUS)	2	9	8	19
4	Malaysia (MAS)	1	1	2	4
5	North Korea (PRK)	0	7	1	8
6	Great Britain (GBR)	0	4	3	7
7	Australia (AUS)	0	2	3	5
7	Ukraine (UKR)	0	2	3	5
9	Germany (GER)	0	0	3	3
9	Japan (JPN)	0	0	3	3
11	France (FRA)	0	0	2	2
11	United States (USA)	0	0	2	2
Totals (12 entries)		40	40	40	120

== Event 1: (China) Beijing ==
The first event took place at the National Aquatics Center in Beijing, China from 9–11 March.

=== Medal table ===
Rank	Nation	Gold	Silver	Bronze	Total
1	China (CHN)	10	4	0	14
2	Great Britain (GBR)	0	1	2	3
2	Russia (RUS)	0	1	2	3
4	Australia (AUS)	0	1	1	2
4	North Korea (PRK)	0	1	1	2
4	Ukraine (UKR)	0	1	1	2
7	Malaysia (MAS)	0	1	0	1
8	Canada (CAN)	0	0	3	3
Totals (8 entries)		10	10	10	30

=== Medal summary ===
==== Men ====
Event	Gold	Silver	Bronze
3m Springboard	Xie Siyi (CHN)	Cao Yuan (CHN)	Ilya Zakharov (RUS)
10m Platform	Yang Jian (CHN)	Chen Aisen (CHN)	Nikita Shleikher (RUS)
Synchronised; 3m Springboard	Cao Yuan (CHN); Xie Siyi (CHN)	Evgeniy Kuznetsov (RUS); Ilia Zakharov (RUS)	Oleksandr Horshkovozov (UKR); Oleh Kolodiy (UKR)
Synchronised; 10m Platform	Chen Aisen (CHN); Yang Hao (CHN)	Maksym Dolhov (UKR); Oleksandr Horshkovozov (UKR)	Tom Daley (GBR); Daniel Goodfellow (GBR)

==== Women ====
Event	Gold	Silver	Bronze
3m Springboard	Shi Tingmao (CHN)	Wang Han (CHN)	Jennifer Abel (CAN)
10m Platform	Zhang Jiaqi (CHN)	Ren Qian (CHN)	Kim Kuk-hyang (PRK)
Synchronised; 3m Springboard	Chen Yiwen (CHN); Wang Han (CHN)	Esther Qin (AUS); Anabelle Smith (AUS)	Jennifer Abel (CAN); Mélissa Citrini-Beaulieu (CAN)
Synchronised; 10m Platform	Zhang Jiaqi (CHN); Zhang Minjie (CHN)	Cheong Jun Hoong (MAS); Pandelela Rinong (MAS)	Taneka Kovchenko (AUS); Melissa Wu (AUS)

==== Mixed ====
Event	Gold	Silver	Bronze
Synchronised; 3m Springboard	Li Zheng (CHN); Wang Han (CHN)	Tom Daley (GBR); Grace Reid (GBR)	Jennifer Abel (CAN); François Imbeau-Dulac (CAN)
Synchronised; 10m Platform	Lian Junjie (CHN); Lin Shan (CHN)	Hyon Il-myong (PRK); Kim Mi-hwa (PRK)	Matty Lee (GBR); Lois Toulson (GBR)

== Event 2: (Japan) Fuji ==
The second event took place at the Shizuoka Prefectural Swimming Pools in Fuji, Japan from 15 to 17 March.

=== Medal table ===
Rank	Nation	Gold	Silver	Bronze	Total
1	China (CHN)	10	3	1	14
2	Russia (RUS)	0	4	2	6
3	Australia (AUS)	0	1	0	1
3	Great Britain (GBR)	0	1	0	1
3	North Korea (PRK)	0	1	0	1
6	Japan (JPN)	0	0	3	3
7	Canada (CAN)	0	0	1	1
7	France (FRA)	0	0	1	1
7	Malaysia (MAS)	0	0	1	1
7	Ukraine (UKR)	0	0	1	1
Totals (10 entries)		10	10	10	30

=== Medal summary ===
==== Men ====
Event	Gold	Silver	Bronze
3m Springboard	Cao Yuan (CHN)	Ilya Zakharov (RUS)	Xie Siyi (CHN)
10m Platform	Lian Junjie (CHN)	Yang Jian (CHN)	Benjamin Auffret (FRA)
Synchronised; 3m Springboard	Cao Yuan (CHN); Xie Siyi (CHN)	Evgeniy Kuznetsov (RUS); Ilia Zakharov (RUS)	Sho Sakai (JPN); Ken Terauchi (JPN)
Synchronised; 10m Platform	Chen Aisen (CHN); Yang Hao (CHN)	Aleksandr Bondar (RUS); Viktor Minibaev (RUS)	Maksym Dolhov (UKR); Oleksandr Horshkovozov (UKR)

==== Women ====
Event	Gold	Silver	Bronze
3m Springboard	Shi Tingmao (CHN)	Wang Han (CHN)	Kristina Ilinykh (RUS)
10m Platform	Zhang Jiaqi (CHN)	Ren Qian (CHN)	Minami Itahashi (JPN)
Synchronised; 3m Springboard	Chang Yani (CHN); Shi Tingmao (CHN)	Esther Qin (AUS); Georgia Sheehan (AUS)	Jennifer Abel (CAN); Mélissa Citrini-Beaulieu (CAN)
Synchronised; 10m Platform	Zhang Jiaqi (CHN); Zhang Minjie (CHN)	Kim Kuk-hyang (PRK); Kim Mi-rae (PRK)	Cheong Jun Hoong (MAS); Pandelela Rinong (MAS)

==== Mixed ====
Event	Gold	Silver	Bronze
Synchronised; 3m Springboard	Li Zheng (CHN); Wang Han (CHN)	Tom Daley (GBR); Grace Reid (GBR)	Nadezhda Bazhina (RUS); Nikita Shleikher (RUS)
Synchronised; 10m Platform	Lian Junjie (CHN); Lin Shan (CHN)	Nikita Shleikher (RUS); Yulia Timoshinina (RUS)	Minami Itahashi (JPN); Kazuki Murakami (JPN)

== Event 3: (Canada) Montreal ==
The third event took place at the Olympic Park in Montreal, Canada from 27 to 29 April.

=== Medal table ===
Rank	Nation	Gold	Silver	Bronze	Total
1	China (CHN)	7	4	1	12
2	Canada (CAN)	2	1	2	5
3	Malaysia (MAS)	1	0	0	1
4	Russia (RUS)	0	2	3	5
5	North Korea (PRK)	0	2	0	2
6	Great Britain (GBR)	0	1	0	1
7	United States (USA)	0	0	2	2
8	Australia (AUS)	0	0	1	1
8	Germany (GER)	0	0	1	1
Totals (9 entries)		10	10	10	30

=== Medal summary ===
==== Men ====
Event	Gold	Silver	Bronze
3m Springboard	Cao Yuan (CHN)	Xie Siyi (CHN)	Ilya Zakharov (RUS)
10m Platform	Qiu Bo (CHN)	Yang Jian (CHN)	Aleksandr Bondar (RUS)
Synchronised; 3m Springboard	Xie Siyi (CHN); Cao Yuan (CHN)	Evgeny Kuznetsov (RUS); Ilya Zakharov (RUS)	Michael Hixon (USA); Sam Dorman (USA)
Synchronised; 10m Platform	Yang Jian (CHN); Qiu Bo (CHN)	Aleksandr Bondar (RUS); Viktor Minibaev (RUS)	Brandon Loschiavo (USA); Steele Johnson (USA)

==== Women ====
Event	Gold	Silver	Bronze
3m Springboard	Shi Tingmao (CHN)	Wang Han (CHN)	Jennifer Abel (CAN)
10m Platform	Ren Qian (CHN)	Si Yajie (CHN)	Meaghan Benfeito (CAN)
Synchronised; 3m Springboard	Chang Yani (CHN); Shi Tingmao (CHN)	Jennifer Abel (CAN); Mélissa Citrini-Beaulieu (CAN)	Anabelle Smith (AUS); Esther Qin (AUS)
Synchronised; 10m Platform	Pandelela Rinong (MAS); Cheong Jun Hoong (MAS)	Kim Mi-rae (PRK); Kim Kuk-hyang (PRK)	Si Yajie (CHN); Lin Shan (CHN)

==== Mixed ====
Event	Gold	Silver	Bronze
Synchronised; 3m Springboard	François Imbeau-Dulac (CAN); Jennifer Abel (CAN)	Tom Daley (GBR); Grace Reid (GBR)	Lou Massenberg (GER); Tina Punzel (GER)
Synchronised; 10m Platform	Nathan Zsombor-Murray (CAN); Meaghan Benfeito (CAN)	Hyon Il-myong (PRK); Kim Mi-hwa (PRK)	Nikita Shleikher (RUS); Yulia Timoshinina (RUS)

== Event 4: (Russia) Kazan ==
The fourth and final event took place at the Aquatics Palace in Kazan, Russia from 4–6 May.

=== Medal table ===
Rank	Nation	Gold	Silver	Bronze	Total
1	China (CHN)	7	2	0	9
2	Russia (RUS)	2	2	1	5
3	Canada (CAN)	1	1	2	4
4	North Korea (PRK)	0	3	0	3
5	Great Britain (GBR)	0	1	1	2
5	Ukraine (UKR)	0	1	1	2
7	Germany (GER)	0	0	2	2
8	Australia (AUS)	0	0	1	1
8	France (FRA)	0	0	1	1
8	Malaysia (MAS)	0	0	1	1
Totals (10 entries)		10	10	10	30

=== Medal summary ===
==== Men ====
Event	Gold	Silver	Bronze
3m Springboard	Xie Siyi (CHN)	Cao Yuan (CHN)	Evgeniy Kuznetsov (RUS)
10m Platform	Yang Jian (CHN)	Aleksandr Bondar (RUS)	Benjamin Auffret (FRA)
Synchronised; 3m Springboard	Cao Yuan (CHN); Xie Siyi (CHN)	Evgeniy Kuznetsov (RUS); Ilia Zakharov (RUS)	Oleksandr Horshkovozov (UKR); Oleh Kolodiy (UKR)
Synchronised; 10m Platform	Aleksandr Bondar (RUS); Viktor Minibaev (RUS)	Oleksandr Horshkovozov (UKR); Maksym Dolhov (UKR)	Florian Fandler (GER); Timo Barthel (GER)

==== Women ====
Event	Gold	Silver	Bronze
3m Springboard	Shi Tingmao (CHN)	Wang Han (CHN)	Jennifer Abel (CAN)
10m Platform	Ren Qian (CHN)	Kim Mi-rae (PRK)	Melissa Wu (AUS)
Synchronised; 3m Springboard	Chang Yani (CHN); Shi Tingmao (CHN)	Jennifer Abel (CAN); Mélissa Citrini-Beaulieu (CAN)	Katherine Torrance (GBR); Grace Reid (GBR)
Synchronised; 10m Platform	Lin Shan (CHN); Si Yajie (CHN)	Kim Mi-rae (PRK); Kim Kuk-hyang (PRK)	Pandelela Rinong (MAS); Cheong Jun Hoong (MAS)

==== Mixed ====
Event	Gold	Silver	Bronze
Synchronised; 3m Springboard	François Imbeau-Dulac (CAN); Jennifer Abel (CAN)	Tom Daley (GBR); Grace Reid (GBR)	Lou Massenberg (GER); Tina Punzel (GER)
Synchronised; 10m Platform	Nikita Shleikher (RUS); Yulia Timoshinina (RUS)	Hyon Il-myong (PRK); Kim Mi-hwa (PRK)	Vincent Riendeau (CAN); Meaghan Benfeito (CAN)

== See also ==
- 2018 FINA Diving World Cup
