= 2018 FINA Diving World Cup =

International diving competition

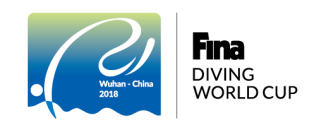
- Host city: Wuhan, China
- Date: June 4–10, 2018
- Venue: Wuhan Sports Center
- Events: 11
- Website: FINA event page

The 2018 FINA Diving World Cup took place in Wuhan, China, from 4 to 10 June 2018. It was the 21st edition of the Diving World Cup, and the seventh time that it had been held in China. The venue was the natatorium of Wuhan Sports Center.

== Schedule ==
All times are local, CST (UTC+8).

Day	Date	Event	Time
0	4 June	10m Sync Final (Mixed); Team Event Final (Mixed)	16:40; 18:50
1	5 June	3m Sync Prelim (Men); 10m Prelim (Women); 3m Sync Final (Men)	10:00; 15:00; 18:05
2	6 June	10m Semi-Final (Women); 3m Prelim (Men); 10m Final (Women)	10:00; 14:30; 18:20
3	7 June	3m Semi-Final (Men); 10m Sync Prelim (Women); 3m Final (Men); 10m Sync Final (Women)	10:00; 14:30; 16:30; 18:20
4	8 June	10m Sync Prelim (Men); 3m Prelim (Women); 10m Sync Final (Men)	10:00; 15:00; 19:30
5	9 June	3m Semi-Final (Women); 10m Prelim (Men); 3m Sync Final (Mixed); 3m Final (Women)	10:00; 13:15; 16:40; 19:50
6	10 June	10m Semi-Final (Men); 3m Sync Prelim (Women); 10m Final (Men); 3m Sync Final (Women)	10:00; 14:30; 16:30; 19:50

== Medal summary ==
As reported by FINA.

=== Men's events ===
Event	Gold		Silver		Bronze	
3m Springboard	Xie Siyi; China	557.60	Cao Yuan; China	544.60	Jack Laugher; United Kingdom	515.00
10m Platform	Chen Aisen; China	557.80	Yang Jian; China	537.40	David Dinsmore; United States	489.80
Synchronised; 3m Springboard	Cao Yuan; Xie Siyi; China	448.74	Jack Laugher; Chris Mears; United Kingdom	440.64	Jahir Ocampo; Rommel Pacheco; Mexico	435.72
Synchronised; 10m Platform	Yang Hao; Chen Aisen; China	491.73	Aleksandr Belevtsev; Nikita Shleikher; Russia	427.20	Declan Stacey; Domonic Bedggood; Australia	409.59

=== Women's events ===
Event	Gold		Silver		Bronze	
3m Springboard	Shi Tingmao; China	404.70	Wang Han; China	383.55	Pamela Ware; Canada	348.75
10m Platform	Zhang Jiaqi; China	427.30	Ren Qian; China	403.85	Pandelela Rinong; Malaysia	349.15
Synchronised; 3m Springboard	Shi Tingmao; Chang Yani; China	334.80	Jennifer Abel; Mélissa Citrini-Beaulieu; Canada	302.04	Anabelle Smith; Esther Qin; Australia	290.10
Synchronised; 10m Platform	Zhang Jiaqi; Zhang Minjie; China	366.12	Kim Mi Hwa; Kim Kuang Hui; North Korea	328.98	Meaghan Benfeito; Caeli McKay; Canada	324.42

=== Mixed events ===
Event	Gold		Silver		Bronze	
Synchronised; 3m Springboard	Li Zheng; Wang Han; China	337.95	Elena Bertocchi; Maicol Verzotto; Italy	303.90	Grace Reid; Ross Haslam; United Kingdom	302.64
Synchronised; 10m Platform	Si Yajie; Lian Junjie; China	353.31	Caell McKay; Vincent Riendeau; Canada	301.20	Valeriia Belova; Sergey Nazin; Russia	299.88
Team Event	Qiu Bo; Chen Yiwen; China	406.20	Oleg Kolodiy; Sofiia Lyskun; Ukraine	388.90	Krysta Palmer; David Dinsmore; United States	374.65

== Medal table ==
As reported by FINA.

Rank	Nation	Gold	Silver	Bronze	Total
1	China (CHN)	11	4	0	15
2	Canada (CAN)	0	2	2	4
3	Great Britain (GBR)	0	1	2	3
4	Russia (RUS)	0	1	1	2
5	Italy (ITA)	0	1	0	1
5	North Korea (PRK)	0	1	0	1
5	Ukraine (UKR)	0	1	0	1
8	Australia (AUS)	0	0	2	2
8	United States (USA)	0	0	2	2
10	Malaysia (MAS)	0	0	1	1
10	Mexico (MEX)	0	0	1	1
Totals (11 entries)		11	11	11	33

== See also ==
- 2018 FINA Diving World Series
