= Diving at the 2014 Asian Games – Women's 1 metre springboard =

Women's 1 metre springboard at the 2014 Asian Games
- Venue: Munhak Park Tae-hwan Aquatics Center
- Date: 1 October 2014
- Competitors: 11 from 7 nations

Medalists
gold medal	Shi Tingmao	China
silver medal	Wang Han	China
bronze medal	Kim Na-mi	South Korea

The women's 1 metre springboard diving competition at the 2014 Asian Games in Incheon was held on 1 October at the Munhak Park Tae-hwan Aquatics Center.

== Schedule ==
All times are Korea Standard Time (UTC+09:00)

Date	Time	Event
Wednesday, 1 October 2014	14:00	Final

== Results ==
Rank	Athlete	Dive					Total
Rank	Athlete	1	2	3	4	5	Total
1st place, gold medalist(s)	Shi Tingmao (CHN)	61.20	58.65	61.20	61.10	66.30	308.45
2nd place, silver medalist(s)	Wang Han (CHN)	57.60	59.80	57.60	57.20	55.20	287.40
3rd place, bronze medalist(s)	Kim Na-mi (KOR)	49.20	58.50	51.75	57.60	52.80	269.85
4	Kim Su-ji (KOR)	54.00	54.60	50.60	54.00	49.50	262.70
5	Cheong Jun Hoong (MAS)	54.00	45.50	51.75	48.00	58.50	257.75
6	Nur Dhabitah Sabri (MAS)	51.60	54.60	48.30	49.20	50.70	254.40
7	Sayaka Shibusawa (JPN)	48.30	54.60	26.40	48.10	50.40	227.80
8	Sharon Chan (HKG)	51.60	44.20	46.00	33.60	47.50	222.90
9	Myra Lee (SIN)	42.90	42.00	43.70	43.20	37.80	209.60
10	Choi Sut Kuan (MAC)	46.80	36.40	47.15	33.60	42.90	206.85
11	Choi Sut Ian (MAC)	50.40	46.80	47.15	50.40	5.20	199.95
