= Diving at the 2010 Asian Games – Women's synchronized 3 metre springboard =

Women's synchronized 3 metre springboard at the 2010 Asian Games
- Venue: Aoti Aquatics Centre
- Date: 22 November 2010
- Competitors: 14 from 7 nations

Medalists
gold medal	Shi Tingmao; Wang Han	China
silver medal	Leong Mun Yee; Ng Yan Yee	Malaysia
bronze medal	Mai Nakagawa; Sayaka Shibusawa	Japan

The women's synchronized 3 metre springboard diving competition at the 2010 Asian Games in Guangzhou was held on 22 November at the Aoti Aquatics Centre.

== Schedule ==
All times are China Standard Time (UTC+08:00)

Date	Time	Event
Monday, 22 November 2010	14:00	Final

== Results ==
Legend

- DNF — Did not finish
- DNS — Did not start

Rank	Team	Dive					Total
Rank	Team	1	2	3	4	5	Total
1st place, gold medalist(s)	China (CHN); Shi Tingmao; Wang Han	52.80	54.00	72.00	68.40	68.40	315.60
2nd place, silver medalist(s)	Malaysia (MAS); Leong Mun Yee; Ng Yan Yee	45.00	36.00	71.10	65.70	62.10	279.90
3rd place, bronze medalist(s)	Japan (JPN); Mai Nakagawa; Sayaka Shibusawa	47.40	45.60	63.90	59.40	61.20	277.50
4	Macau (MAC); Choi Sut Ian; Lo I Teng	45.00	40.80	53.28	56.70	61.32	257.10
5	Vietnam (VIE); Nguyễn Vũ Thảo Quyên; Nguyễn Vũ Thảo Quỳnh	40.20	40.80	49.68	42.93	42.84	216.45
6	Indonesia (INA); Sari Ambarwati; Maria Natalie Dinda Anasti	39.60	40.80	41.04	48.60	45.00	215.04
—	South Korea (KOR); Kim Na-mi; Lee Yae-rim	42.00	DNS				DNF
