= Zhang Jiaqi =

Zhang Jiaqi may refer to:

- Zhang Jiaqi (footballer)
- Zhang Jiaqi (diver)
