= Diving at the 2017 World Aquatics Championships – Women's synchronized 3 metre springboard =

Women's synchronized 3 metre springboard at the 2017 World Aquatics Championships
- Venue: Danube Arena
- Location: Budapest, Hungary
- Dates: 17 July
- Competitors: 38 from 19 nations
- Teams: 19
- Winning points: 333.30

Medalists
gold medal	Chang Yani; Shi Tingmao	China
silver medal	Jennifer Abel; Melissa Citrini-Beaulieu	Canada
bronze medal	Nadezhda Bazhina; Kristina Ilinykh	Russia

The Women's synchronized 3 metre springboard competition at the 2017 World Championships was held on 17 July 2017.

== Results ==
The preliminary round was started at 10:00. The final was held at 16:00.

Green denotes finalists

Rank	Nation	Divers	Preliminary		Final	
Rank	Nation	Divers	Points	Rank	Points	Rank
1st place, gold medalist(s)	China	Chang Yani; Shi Tingmao	320.40	1	333.30	1
2nd place, silver medalist(s)	Canada	Jennifer Abel; Melissa Citrini-Beaulieu	306.60	2	323.43	2
3rd place, bronze medalist(s)	Russia	Nadezhda Bazhina; Kristina Ilinykh	304.80	3	312.60	3
4	Australia	Maddison Keeney; Anabelle Smith	297.66	4	301.23	4
5	Great Britain	Grace Reid; Katherine Torrance	271.20	8	294.60	5
6	Malaysia	Ng Yan Yee; Nur Dhabitah Sabri	291.54	5	288.72	6
7	Ukraine	Anastasiia Nedobiha; Diana Shelestyuk	270.57	9	280.56	7
8	Netherlands	Inge Jansen; Daphne Wils	258.30	12	280.50	8
9	Germany	Friederike Freyer; Tina Punzel	269.10	10	279.60	9
10	Mexico	Arantxa Chávez; Melany Hernández	274.62	7	279.27	10
11	United States	Maria Coburn; Alison Gibson	283.65	6	252.42	11
12	Brazil	Luana Lira; Tammy Takagi	265.20	11	247.05	12
13	South Korea	Kim Na-mi; Moon Na-yun	251.88	13	did not advance	
14	South Africa	Micaela Bouter; Nicole Gillis	249.66	14	did not advance	
15	Switzerland	Vivian Barth; Jessica-Floriane Favre	243.75	15	did not advance	
16	Macau	Choi Sut Kuan; Choi Sut Ian	241.92	16	did not advance	
17	Hungary	Flóra Gondos; Villő Kormos	237.54	17	did not advance	
18	Lithuania	Indrė Girdauskaitė; Genevieve Green	226.53	18	did not advance	
19	New Zealand	Shaye Boddington; Elizabeth Cui	218.10	19	did not advance	
