= Diving at the 2018 Asian Games – Women's 3 metre springboard =

Women's 3 metre springboard at the 2018 Asian Games
- Venue: Gelora Bung Karno Aquatic Stadium
- Date: 1 September 2018
- Competitors: 12 from 7 nations

Medalists
gold medal	Shi Tingmao	China
silver medal	Wang Han	China
bronze medal	Nur Dhabitah Sabri	Malaysia

The women's 3 metre springboard competition at the 2018 Asian Games took place on 1 September 2018 at the Gelora Bung Karno Aquatic Stadium.

== Schedule ==
All times are Western Indonesia Time (UTC+07:00)

Date	Time	Event
Saturday, 1 September 2018	11:55	Preliminary
Saturday, 1 September 2018	19:15	Final

== Results ==
=== Preliminary ===
Rank	Athlete	Dive					Total
Rank	Athlete	1	2	3	4	5	Total
1	Shi Tingmao (CHN)	75.00	79.50	81.00	74.40	75.00	384.90
2	Wang Han (CHN)	75.00	73.50	72.00	75.95	76.50	372.95
3	Sayaka Mikami (JPN)	57.00	65.10	64.50	58.50	67.50	312.60
4	Nur Dhabitah Sabri (MAS)	67.50	66.65	40.50	67.50	61.50	303.65
5	Kim Na-mi (KOR)	55.35	60.20	51.80	57.40	63.00	287.75
6	Hazuki Miyamoto (JPN)	54.00	54.00	54.00	63.00	55.50	280.50
7	Ng Yan Yee (MAS)	60.00	65.10	52.50	31.50	67.50	276.60
8	Kim Su-ji (KOR)	59.40	35.00	58.80	53.20	60.00	266.40
9	Chan Lam (HKG)	40.80	35.70	43.20	43.20	47.60	203.90
10	Linadini Yasmin (INA)	54.00	46.80	25.20	36.40	40.80	203.20
11	Maria Natalie Dinda Anasti (INA)	44.40	37.80	36.00	34.50	31.50	184.20
12	Choi Sut Kuan (MAC)	45.60	47.25	32.20	0.00	39.60	164.65

=== Final ===
Rank	Athlete	Dive					Total
Rank	Athlete	1	2	3	4	5	Total
1st place, gold medalist(s)	Shi Tingmao (CHN)	76.50	81.00	81.00	74.40	76.50	389.40
2nd place, silver medalist(s)	Wang Han (CHN)	76.50	76.50	78.00	74.40	78.00	383.40
3rd place, bronze medalist(s)	Nur Dhabitah Sabri (MAS)	67.50	69.75	64.50	67.50	61.50	330.75
4	Sayaka Mikami (JPN)	63.00	65.10	63.00	66.00	64.50	321.60
5	Ng Yan Yee (MAS)	64.50	55.80	58.50	63.00	63.00	304.80
6	Hazuki Miyamoto (JPN)	61.50	52.80	60.00	63.00	58.50	295.80
7	Kim Na-mi (KOR)	59.40	56.00	54.60	58.80	63.00	291.80
8	Kim Su-ji (KOR)	56.70	50.40	53.20	57.40	55.50	273.20
9	Choi Sut Kuan (MAC)	46.80	44.55	49.00	32.20	37.20	209.75
10	Linadini Yasmin (INA)	52.65	44.40	33.60	42.00	32.40	205.05
11	Maria Natalie Dinda Anasti (INA)	43.20	49.95	37.00	45.00	27.00	202.15
12	Chan Lam (HKG)	35.15	36.75	39.60	40.50	40.60	192.60
