= Diving at the 2020 Summer Olympics – Women's 3 metre springboard =

Women's 3 metre springboard at the Games of the XXXII Olympiad
- Venue: Tokyo Aquatics Centre
- Date: 30 July (Preliminary); 31 July (Semifinal); 1 August (Final)
- Competitors: 27 from 17 nations

Medalists
1st place, gold medalist(s)		Shi Tingmao	China
2nd place, silver medalist(s)		Wang Han	China
3rd place, bronze medalist(s)		Krysta Palmer	United States

The women's 3 metre springboard diving competition at the 2020 Summer Olympics in Tokyo was held from 30 July to 1 August 2021 at the Tokyo Aquatics Centre. It was the 24th appearance of the event, which has been held at every Olympic Games since the 1920 Summer Olympics.

== Competition format ==
The competition was held in three rounds:

- Preliminary round: All divers performed five dives; the top 18 divers advanced to the semi-final.
- Semi-final: The 18 divers performed five dives; the scores of the qualifications were erased and the top 12 divers advanced to the final.
- Final: The 12 divers performed five dives; the semi-final scores were erased and the top three divers won the gold, silver and bronze medals accordingly.

Within each round of five dives, one dive must be from each of the five groups (forward, back, reverse, inward, and twisting). Each dive was assigned a degree of difficulty based on somersaults, position, twists, approach, and entry. There was no limit to the degree of difficulty of dives; the most difficult dives calculated in the FINA rulebook (reverse 4 1/2 somersault in pike position and back 4 1/2 somersault in pike position) were 4.7, but competitors could attempt more difficult dives. Scoring was done by a panel of seven judges. For each dive, each judge gave a score between 0 and 10 with 0.5 point increments. The top two and bottom two scores were discarded. The remaining three scores were summed and multiplied by the degree of difficulty to give a dive score. The five dive scores were summed to give the score for the round.

== Schedule ==
All times are Japan standard time (UTC+9)

Date	Time	Round
Friday, 30 July 2021	15:00	Preliminary
Saturday, 31 July 2021	15:00	Semifinal
Sunday, 1 August 2021	15:00	Final

== Qualification ==
The top 12 divers at the 2019 World Aquatics Championships earned a quota spot for their NOC. The top 1 diver at each of the 5 continental championships earned a spot (excluding divers who earned a spot at the World Championships and divers from NOCs that had already earned two spots). Additional quota places go to the next best finishers in the 2020 FINA World Cup (with the same limitations) until the maximum number of divers is reached. Divers must be at least 14 years old by the end of 2020 to compete.

== Results ==
Rank	Diver	Nation	Preliminary		Semifinal		Final					
Rank	Diver	Nation	Points	Rank	Points	Rank	Dive 1	Dive 2	Dive 3	Dive 4	Dive 5	Points
1st place, gold medalist(s)	Shi Tingmao	China	350.45	1	371.45	1	76.50	76.50	75.00	77.50	78.00	383.50
2nd place, silver medalist(s)	Wang Han	China	347.25	2	346.85	2	72.00	67.50	66.00	69.75	73.50	348.75
3rd place, bronze medalist(s)	Krysta Palmer	United States	279.10	15	316.65	5	67.50	63.00	73.50	66.65	73.10	343.75
4	Nur Dhabitah Sabri	Malaysia	291.60	10	312.60	6	63.00	66.65	61.50	67.50	67.50	326.15
5	Inge Jansen	Netherlands	278.75	16	301.90	9	63.00	63.00	58.50	63.55	63.00	311.05
6	Aranza Vázquez	Mexico	294.30	8	318.60	4	63.00	60.45	66.00	46.50	67.50	303.45
7	Tina Punzel	Germany	287.00	14	311.05	7	66.00	44.95	61.50	63.00	67.50	302.95
8	Jennifer Abel	Canada	332.40	3	341.40	3	63.00	69.75	39.00	64.50	61.20	297.45
9	Hailey Hernandez	United States	309.55	6	291.60	10	58.05	58.80	58.80	58.80	54.00	288.45
10	Mariia Poliakova	ROC	288.55	13	290.10	11	61.50	39.00	63.00	57.00	63.55	284.05
11	Michelle Heimberg	Switzerland	289.95	11	289.80	12	60.00	63.00	41.85	54.00	64.50	283.35
12	Esther Qin	Australia	292.80	9	309.15	8	67.50	29.45	61.50	42.00	61.50	261.95
13	Emma Gullstrand	Sweden	289.65	12	288.85	13	Did not advance					
14	Anabelle Smith	Australia	272.05	18	285.60	14	Did not advance					
15	Kim Su-ji	South Korea	304.20	7	283.90	15	Did not advance					
16	Sayaka Mikami	Japan	317.10	5	273.70	16	Did not advance					
17	Haruka Enomoto	Japan	277.85	17	255.40	17	Did not advance					
18	Pamela Ware	Canada	330.10	4	245.10	18	Did not advance					
19	Grace Reid	Great Britain	268.15	19	Did not advance							
20	Ng Yan Yee	Malaysia	251.95	20	Did not advance							
21	Luana Lira	Brazil	244.35	21	Did not advance							
22	Scarlett Mew Jensen	Great Britain	243.25	22	Did not advance							
23	Viktoriya Kesar	Ukraine	238.20	23	Did not advance							
24	Anna Pysmenska	Ukraine	232.30	24	Did not advance							
25	Julia Vincent	South Africa	228.90	25	Did not advance							
26	Micaela Bouter	South Africa	216.15	26	Did not advance							
27	Arantxa Chávez	Mexico	190.35	27	Did not advance							
