= Diving at the 2020 European Aquatics Championships – Women's 10 m platform =

Women's 10 m platform at the 2020 European Aquatics Championships
- Venue: Danube Arena
- Dates: 13 May 2021
- Competitors: 19 from 11 nations
- Winning points: 365.25

Medalists
gold medal	Anna Konanykhina	Russia
silver medal	Yulia Timoshinina	Russia
bronze medal	Andrea Spendolini-Sirieix	Great Britain

The Women's 10 m platform competition of the 2020 European Aquatics Championships was held on 13 May 2021.

== Results ==
The preliminary round was started on at 12:00. The final was held at 20:55.

Green denotes finalists

Rank	Diver	Nationality	Preliminary		Final	
Rank	Diver	Nationality	Points	Rank	Points	Rank
1st place, gold medalist(s)	Anna Konanykhina	Russia	260.15	11	365.25	1
2nd place, silver medalist(s)	Yulia Timoshinina	Russia	288.70	3	329.20	2
3rd place, bronze medalist(s)	Andrea Spendolini-Sirieix	Great Britain	276.40	8	326.60	3
4	Sofiya Lyskun	Ukraine	297.25	1	321.75	4
5	Lois Toulson	Great Britain	253.80	12	321.10	5
6	Celine van Duijn	Netherlands	289.60	2	299.80	6
7	Alaïs Kalonji	France	275.75	9	286.25	7
8	Christina Wassen	Germany	280.80	7	279.95	8
9	Sarah Jodoin Di Maria	Italy	273.60	10	278.35	9
10	Tanya Watson	Ireland	287.70	4	275.10	10
11	Noemi Batki	Italy	282.70	6	270.10	11
12	Elena Wassen	Germany	283.35	5	258.65	12
13	Ciara McGing	Ireland	251.80	13	did not advance	
14	Guurtje Praasterink	Netherlands	251.55	14	did not advance	
15	Helle Tuxen	Norway	245.65	15	did not advance	
16	Anne Tuxen	Norway	243.40	16	did not advance	
17	Nicoleta Muscalu	Romania	220.60	17	did not advance	
18	Maïssam Naji	France	207.40	18	did not advance	
19	Dominika Mirowska	Poland	179.75	19	did not advance	
