= Diving at the 2017 World Aquatics Championships – Women's 3 metre springboard =

Women's 3 metre springboard at the 2017 World Aquatics Championships
- Venue: Danube Arena
- Location: Budapest, Hungary
- Dates: 20 July (preliminaries and semifinal); 21 July (final)
- Competitors: 40 from 25 nations
- Winning points: 383.50

Medalists
gold medal	Shi Tingmao	China
silver medal	Wang Han	China
bronze medal	Jennifer Abel	Canada

The Women's 3 metre springboard competition at the 2017 World Championships was held on 20 and 21 July 2017.

== Results ==
The preliminary round was started on 20 July at 10:00. The semifinals were held on 20 July at 15:30. The final was started on 21 July at 18:30.

Green denotes finalists

Blue denotes semifinalists

Rank	Diver	Nationality	Preliminary		Semifinal		Final	
Rank	Diver	Nationality	Points	Rank	Points	Rank	Points	Rank
1st place, gold medalist(s)	Shi Tingmao	China	353.30	1	380.45	1	383.50	1
2nd place, silver medalist(s)	Wang Han	China	344.35	2	354.90	2	359.40	2
3rd place, bronze medalist(s)	Jennifer Abel	Canada	335.00	3	337.60	4	351.55	3
4	Grace Reid	Great Britain	284.00	14	309.60	8	336.70	4
5	Maddison Keeney	Australia	310.95	6	324.80	5	335.50	5
6	Pamela Ware	Canada	317.25	5	338.25	3	335.10	6
7	Kristina Ilinykh	Russia	317.85	4	311.90	7	319.40	7
8	Inge Jansen	Netherlands	307.75	7	303.45	10	307.85	8
9	Maria Polyakova	Russia	288.75	11	294.60	11	299.20	9
10	Nur Dhabitah Sabri	Malaysia	285.10	13	321.70	6	292.35	10
11	Anabelle Smith	Australia	299.10	8	306.75	9	268.95	11
12	Julia Vincent	South Africa	270.20	17	289.65	12	265.90	12
13	Ng Yan Yee	Malaysia	291.10	10	285.30	13	did not advance	
14	Dolores Hernández	Mexico	293.00	9	285.05	14	did not advance	
15	Arantxa Chávez	Mexico	266.10	18	278.25	15	did not advance	
16	Anastasiia Nedobiha	Ukraine	273.00	16	274.65	16	did not advance	
17	Alena Khamulkina	Belarus	285.20	12	273.35	17	did not advance	
18	Kim Na-mi	South Korea	281.10	15	272.25	18	did not advance	
19	Daphne Wils	Netherlands	264.50	19	did not advance			
20	Elena Bertocchi	Italy	262.35	20	did not advance			
21	Jessica-Floriane Favre	Switzerland	261.15	21	did not advance			
22	Kaja Skrzek	Poland	260.35	22	did not advance			
23	Tammy Takagi	Brazil	257.45	23	did not advance			
24	Michelle Heimberg	Switzerland	253.50	24	did not advance			
25	Brooke Schultz	United States	248.80	25	did not advance			
26	Katherine Torrance	Great Britain	245.50	26	did not advance			
27	Maha Eissa	Egypt	245.40	27	did not advance			
28	Marcela Marić	Croatia	245.35	28	did not advance			
29	Anca Serb	Romania	244.95	29	did not advance			
30	Micaela Bouter	South Africa	231.40	30	did not advance			
31	Moon Na-yun	South Korea	230.30	31	did not advance			
32	Luana Lira	Brazil	228.85	32	did not advance			
33	Elizabeth Cui	New Zealand	221.70	33	did not advance			
34	Genevieve Green	Lithuania	220.95	34	did not advance			
35	Tina Punzel	Germany	220.30	35	did not advance			
36	Diana Pineda	Colombia	218.55	36	did not advance			
37	Krysta Palmer	United States	216.70	37	did not advance			
38	Hanna Pysmenska	Ukraine	216.60	38	did not advance			
39	Friederike Freyer	Germany	212.40	39	did not advance			
40	Prisis Prisis	Cuba	196.00	40	did not advance			
