= Diving at the 2026 Asian Games – Men's 1 metre springboard =

Diving competition

Men's 1 metre springboard at the 2026 Asian Games
- Venue: Tokyo Aquatics Centre
- Date: 28 September 2026
- Competitors: 15 from 10 nations

Medalists
gold medal	Wang Zongyuan	China
silver medal	Kim Yeong-nam	South Korea
bronze medal	Liu Chengzan	China

The men's 1 metre springboard competition at the 2026 Asian Games took place on 28 September 2026 at Tokyo Aquatics Centre.

== Schedule ==
All times are Japan Standard Time (UTC+09:00)

Date	Time	Event
Monday, 28 September 2026	13:00	Final

== Results ==
Rank	Athlete	Dive						Total
Rank	Athlete	1	2	3	4	5	6	Total
1st place, gold medalist(s)	Wang Zongyuan (CHN)	72.00	63.00	76.80	81.60	70.95	78.40	442.75
2nd place, silver medalist(s)	Kim Yeong-nam (KOR)	61.20	59.40	62.40	63.00	68.80	58.50	373.30
3rd place, bronze medalist(s)	Liu Chengzan (CHN)	67.50	67.20	36.00	73.60	56.10	61.05	361.45
4	Sam Vajir (IRI)	55.80	61.50	46.50	64.50	57.60	58.50	344.40
5	Kim Ji-wook (KOR)	55.80	52.80	65.60	43.20	54.00	64.80	336.20
6	Syafiq Puteh (MAS)	55.90	57.35	52.50	58.50	58.50	40.50	323.25
7	Max Lee (SGP)	65.10	43.50	49.50	49.50	44.80	45.00	297.40
8	Chawanwat Juntaphadawon (THA)	54.60	48.00	22.50	31.50	48.00	66.30	270.90
9	Mohammad Moghaddasi (IRI)	41.85	46.80	34.50	45.00	43.75	42.00	253.90
10	Nazar Kozhanov (KAZ)	32.55	36.00	42.00	30.00	60.80	47.85	249.20
11	Kirill Novikov (KAZ)	42.90	25.50	36.00	43.20	35.10	41.85	224.55
12	Yuen Pak Yin (HKG)	46.80	48.05	45.00	33.00	9.00	40.50	222.35
13	Dulanjan Fernando (SRI)	51.15	37.70	27.00	30.00	34.50	40.00	220.35
14	Yong Rui Jie (MAS)	52.00	60.45	19.50	13.50	31.50	20.80	197.75
15	Abduvakhab Vakhabov (UZB)	36.00	35.10	34.50	13.50	24.80	33.80	177.70
