= Diving at the 2020 Summer Olympics – Women's synchronized 3 metre springboard =

Women's synchronized 3 metre springboard at the Games of the XXXII Olympiad
- Venue: Tokyo Aquatics Centre
- Date: 25 July 2021
- Competitors: 16 from 8 nations
- Teams: 8 pairs
- Winning total: 326.40 points

Medalists
| 1st place, gold medalist(s) | | Shi Tingmao; Wang Han | China |
| 2nd place, silver medalist(s) | | Jennifer Abel; Melissa Citrini-Beaulieu | Canada |
| 3rd place, bronze medalist(s) | | Lena Hentschel; Tina Punzel | Germany |

The women's synchronized 3 metre springboard diving competition at the 2020 Summer Olympics in Tokyo was held on 25 July 2021 at the Tokyo Aquatics Centre. It was the 6th appearance of the event, which had been held at every Olympic Games since the 2000 Summer Olympics.

The medals for the competition were presented by Nicole Hoevertsz, Aruba; IOC Executive Board Member, and the medalists' bouquets were presented by Dale Neuburger, United States; FINA Treasurer and a Gift Presenter.

== Competition format ==
The competition was held in a single round, consisting of each pair performing five dives. Each dive was from a different group (forward, back, reverse, inward, and twisting). The first two dives were given a fixed degree of difficulty of 2.0, regardless of the dive performed. The other three dives were assigned a degree of difficulty based on somersaults, position, twists, approach, and entry. There was no limit to the degree of difficulty of dives; the most difficult dives calculated in the FINA rulebook (reverse 4 1/2 somersault in pike position and back 4 1/2 somersault in pike position) was 4.7, but competitors could attempt more difficult dives. Scoring was done by a panel of eleven judges, with five judges evaluating synchronization and three judges evaluating execution of each individual diver. For each dive, each judge gave a score between 0 and 10 with 0.5 point increments. The top and bottom synchronization scores and the top and bottom execution scores for each diver were discarded. The remaining five scores were summed, multiplied by 3/5, and multiplied by the degree of difficulty to give a dive score. The five dive scores were summed to give the score for the round.

== Schedule ==
All times are Japan standard time (UTC+9)

| Date | Time | Round |
|---|---|---|
| 25 July 2021 | 15:00 | Final |

== Qualification ==
The top 3 teams at the 2019 World Aquatics Championships earned a quota spot for their NOC. Japan, as the host country, was guaranteed a quota spot. The next 4 teams at the 2020 FINA World Cup also received a quota spot. Divers must be at least 14 years old by the end of 2020 to compete.

== Results ==
| Rank | Divers | Nation | Final | | | | | |
| Rank | Divers | Nation | Dive 1 | Dive 2 | Dive 3 | Dive 4 | Dive 5 | Points |
|---|---|---|---|---|---|---|---|---|
| 1st place, gold medalist(s) | Shi Tingmao; Wang Han | China | 49.80 | 49.80 | 75.60 | 74.70 | 76.50 | 326.40 |
| 2nd place, silver medalist(s) | Jennifer Abel; Melissa Citrini-Beaulieu | Canada | 47.40 | 45.00 | 67.50 | 70.68 | 70.20 | 300.78 |
| 3rd place, bronze medalist(s) | Lena Hentschel; Tina Punzel | Germany | 48.60 | 46.20 | 63.00 | 63.00 | 64.17 | 284.97 |
| 4 | Dolores Hernandez Monzon; Carolina Mendoza | Mexico | 44.40 | 46.20 | 61.20 | 57.60 | 65.70 | 275.10 |
| 5 | Haruka Enomoto; Hazuki Miyamoto | Japan | 45.60 | 45.60 | 63.00 | 58.50 | 56.70 | 269.40 |
| 6 | Katherine Torrance; Grace Reid | Great Britain | 46.80 | 50.40 | 61.20 | 50.40 | 60.30 | 269.10 |
| 7 | Elena Bertocchi; Chiara Pellacani | Italy | 49.20 | 48.00 | 63.00 | 61.38 | 45.90 | 267.48 |
| 8 | Alison Gibson; Krysta Palmer | United States | 49.20 | 50.40 | 54.90 | 43.71 | 65.28 | 263.49 |
