= Diving at the 2020 Summer Olympics – Men's 3 metre springboard =

Men's 3 metre springboard at the Games of the XXXII Olympiad
- Venue: Tokyo Aquatics Centre
- Date: 2 August 2021 (Preliminary & semifinals); 3 August 2021 (Final)
- Competitors: 29 from 20 nations
- Winning total: 558.75

Medalists
1st place, gold medalist(s)		Xie Siyi	China
2nd place, silver medalist(s)		Wang Zongyuan	China
3rd place, bronze medalist(s)		Jack Laugher	Great Britain

The men's 3 metre springboard diving competition at the 2020 Summer Olympics in Tokyo was held in 2021 at the Tokyo Aquatics Centre. It was the 26th appearance of the event, which has been held at every Olympic Games since the 1908 Summer Olympics.

== Competition format ==
The competition was held in three rounds:

- Preliminary round: All divers perform six dives; the top 18 divers advance to the semi-final.
- Semi-final: The scores of the preliminary round are erased. The 18 remaining divers perform six dives each, and the top 12 divers advance to the final.
- Final: The semi-final scores are erased. The 12 final divers perform six dives each, and the top three divers win the gold, silver and bronze medals respectively.

Within each round of six dives, at least one dive must be from each of the five groups (forward, back, reverse, inward, and twisting). The sixth dive may be from any group, but may not repeat one of the other dives. Each dive is assigned a degree of difficulty based on somersaults, position, twists, approach, and entry. There is no limit to the degree of difficulty of dives; the most difficult dives calculated in the FINA rulebook (reverse 4 1/2 somersault in pike position and back 4 1/2 somersault in pike position) are 4.7, but competitors could attempt more difficult dives. Scoring is done by a panel of seven judges. For each dive, each judge gives a score between 0 and 10 with 0.5 point increments. The top two and bottom two scores are discarded. The remaining three scores are summed and multiplied by the degree of difficulty to give a dive score. The six dive scores are summed to give the score for the round.

== Schedule ==
All times are Japan standard time (UTC+9)

Date	Time	Round
Monday, 2 August 2021	15:00	Preliminary
Tuesday, 3 August 2021	10:00; 15:00	Semifinal; Final

== Qualification ==
The top 12 divers at the 2019 World Aquatics Championships earned a quota spot for their NOC. The top 1 diver at each of the 5 continental championships earned a spot (excluding divers who earned a spot at the World Championships and divers from NOCs that had already earned two spots). Additional quota places go to the next best finishers in the 2020 FINA World Cup (with the same limitations) until the maximum number of divers is reached. Divers must be at least 14 years old by the end of 2020 to compete.

== Results ==
Rank	Diver	Nation	Preliminary		Semifinal		Final						
Rank	Diver	Nation	Points	Rank	Points	Rank	Dive 1	Dive 2	Dive 3	Dive 4	Dive 5	Dive 6	Points
1st place, gold medalist(s)	Xie Siyi	China	520.90	2	543.45	1	91.80	89.10	86.40	94.50	94.35	102.60	558.75
2nd place, silver medalist(s)	Wang Zongyuan	China	531.30	1	540.50	2	86.70	84.00	85.80	84.00	91.80	102.60	534.90
3rd place, bronze medalist(s)	Jack Laugher	Great Britain	445.05	6	514.75	3	85.00	85.75	81.60	81.00	96.90	87.75	518.00
4	Woo Ha-ram	South Korea	452.45	5	403.15	12	76.50	81.60	91.20	82.25	68.40	81.90	481.85
5	Evgeny Kuznetsov	ROC	444.75	7	453.85	5	74.80	78.20	76.05	43.20	92.75	96.90	461.90
6	Rommel Pacheco	Mexico	479.25	3	437.65	6	83.30	63.00	73.10	79.20	33.25	96.90	428.75
7	Martin Wolfram	Germany	444.50	8	423.00	9	61.50	77.00	78.75	69.70	68.40	71.40	426.75
8	Anton Down-Jenkins	New Zealand	394.45	16	424.20	8	67.50	67.50	70.50	74.40	66.00	69.70	415.60
9	James Heatly	Great Britain	458.40	4	454.85	4	58.50	71.40	73.50	57.75	85.50	64.35	411.00
10	Andrew Capobianco	United States	385.50	17	419.60	10	76.50	84.00	42.00	48.60	76.50	74.10	401.70
11	Mohab El-Kordy	Egypt	422.75	12	408.85	11	72.00	39.10	76.50	69.30	50.75	85.50	393.15
12	Ken Terauchi	Japan	430.20	10	424.50	7	67.50	63.00	29.70	69.00	56.10	74.40	359.70
13	Jonathan Ruvalcaba	Dominican Republic	383.05	18	398.65	13	Did not advance						
14	Osmar Olvera	Mexico	442.45	9	384.80	14	Did not advance						
15	Yona Knight-Wisdom	Jamaica	411.65	13	362.95	15	Did not advance						
16	Alexis Jandard	France	423.60	11	357.85	16	Did not advance						
17	Daniel Restrepo	Colombia	411.50	14	329.30	17	Did not advance						
18	Sebastián Morales	Colombia	400.85	15	324.95	18	Did not advance						
19	Nicolás García	Spain	382.60	19	Did not advance								
20	Lorenzo Marsaglia	Italy	369.60	20	Did not advance								
21	Patrick Hausding	Germany	364.05	21	Did not advance								
22	Oleh Kolodiy	Ukraine	351.25	22	Did not advance								
23	Tyler Downs	United States	348.70	23	Did not advance								
24	Nikita Shleikher	ROC	339.70	24	Did not advance								
25	Oliver Dingley	Ireland	335.00	25	Did not advance								
26	Alberto Arévalo	Spain	322.85	26	Did not advance								
27	Li Shixin	Australia	320.35	27	Did not advance								
28	Kim Yeong-nam	South Korea	286.80	28	Did not advance								
29	Cédric Fofana	Canada	225.35	29	Did not advance								
