= Diving at the 2019 World Aquatics Championships – Women's synchronized 3 metre springboard =

Women's synchronized 3 metre springboard at the 2019 World Aquatics Championships
- Venue: Nambu University Municipal Aquatics Center
- Location: Gwangju, South Korea
- Dates: 15 July
- Competitors: 46 from 23 nations
- Teams: 23
- Winning points: 342.00

Medalists
gold medal	Shi Tingmao; Wang Han	China
silver medal	Jennifer Abel; Mélissa Citrini-Beaulieu	Canada
bronze medal	Paola Espinosa; Melany Hernández	Mexico

The Women's synchronized 3 metre springboard competition at the 2019 World Aquatics Championships was held on 15 July 2019.

== Results ==
The preliminary round was started at 10:00. The final was held at 15:30.

Green denotes finalists

Rank	Nation	Divers	Preliminary		Final	
Rank	Nation	Divers	Points	Rank	Points	Rank
1st place, gold medalist(s)	China	Shi Tingmao; Wang Han	309.90	1	342.00	1
2nd place, silver medalist(s)	Canada	Jennifer Abel; Mélissa Citrini-Beaulieu	292.08	2	311.10	2
3rd place, bronze medalist(s)	Mexico	Paola Espinosa; Melany Hernández	265.50	8	294.90	3
4	Russia	Kristina Ilinykh; Maria Polyakova	267.90	7	292.80	4
5	Great Britain	Grace Reid; Katherine Torrance	280.53	4	289.80	5
6	Australia	Maddison Keeney; Anabelle Smith	287.43	3	278.13	6
7	Netherlands	Inge Jansen; Celine van Duijn	259.50	10	277.50	7
8	Malaysia	Ng Yan Yee; Nur Dhabitah Sabri	270.60	6	277.35	8
9	Italy	Elena Bertocchi; Chiara Pellacani	257.37	12	274.74	9
10	United States	Alison Gibson; Krysta Palmer	274.44	5	274.47	10
11	Switzerland	Madeline Coquoz; Jessica Favre	264.78	9	268.95	11
12	South Korea	Cho Eun-bi; Kim Su-ji	257.52	11	258.75	12
13	Germany	Lena Hentschel; Tina Punzel	253.59	13	did not advance	
14	Japan	Haruka Enomoto; Hazuki Miyamoto	253.50	14	did not advance	
15	Ukraine	Viktoriya Kesar; Hanna Pysmenska	249.03	15	did not advance	
16	Brazil	Luana Lira; Tammy Takagi	242.07	16	did not advance	
17	New Zealand	Elizabeth Cui; Goh Yu Qian	236.40	17	did not advance	
18	Colombia	Steffanie Madrigal; Diana Pineda	234.42	18	did not advance	
19	Norway	Anne Tuxen; Helle Tuxen	223.32	19	did not advance	
20	Cuba	Anisley García; Prisis Ruiz	219.30	20	did not advance	
21	Singapore	Fong Kay Yian; Ashlee Tan	206.49	21	did not advance	
22	Macau	Choi Sut Kuan; Leong Sut Chan	174.21	22	did not advance	
23	Thailand	Surincha Booranapol; Ramanya Yanmongkon	174.06	23	did not advance	
