= Freida Lim =

Singaporean diver (born 1998)

Personal information
- Full name: Shen-Yan Freida Lim
- National team: Singapore
- Born: 7 February 1998 (age 27)
- Education: Clemson University, University of Georgia

Sport
- Sport: Diving
- Event(s): 3 m, 10 m, 10 m synchro

Shen-Yan Freida Lim (born 7 February 1998) is a Singaporean diver. She qualified to compete at the 2020 Summer Olympics in the 10 metre platform by placing 15th at the semi-finals of the 2021 FINA Diving World Cup in the 10 metre platform event. This made her the first female Singaporean diver to qualify for the Olympics and the second ever Singaporean diver to qualify for the Olympics, following Jonathan Chan.

== Personal life ==
Lim started in competitive swimming as a child. When she was 14, she was diagnosed with Graves' disease, which meant that she had to stop swimming and choose a different sport that was less endurance-based. She chose diving.

She attended Clemson University for her freshman year of college. At the end of the season, they abruptly ended their diving program, which led her to transfer to the University of Georgia. She competed for Georgia for three seasons and graduated in May 2021 with degrees in Dietetics and Culinary Science & Nutrition.
