= Diving at the 2020 Summer Olympics – Men's synchronized 3 metre springboard =

Men's synchronized 3 metre springboard at the Games of the XXXII Olympiad
- Venue: Tokyo Aquatics Centre
- Date: 28 July 2021
- Competitors: 16 from 8 nations
- Winning total: 467.82

Medalists
1st place, gold medalist(s)		Wang Zongyuan; Xie Siyi	China
2nd place, silver medalist(s)		Andrew Capobianco; Michael Hixon	United States
3rd place, bronze medalist(s)		Patrick Hausding; Lars Rüdiger	Germany

The men's synchronized 3 metre springboard diving competition at the 2020 Summer Olympics in Tokyo was held on 28 July 2021 at the Tokyo Aquatics Centre. It was the 6th appearance of the event, which has been held at every Olympic Games since the 2000 Summer Olympics.

== Competition format ==
The competition was held in a single round, consisting of each pair performing six dives. Each dive was from a different group (forward, back, reverse, inward, and twisting). The first two dives were given a fixed degree of difficulty of 2.0, regardless of the dive performed. The other four dives were assigned a degree of difficulty based on somersaults, position, twists, approach, and entry. There was no limit to the degree of difficulty of dives; the most difficult dives calculated in the FINA rulebook (reverse 4 1/2 somersault in pike position and back 4 1/2 somersault in pike position) was 4.7, but competitors could attempt more difficult dives. Scoring was done by a panel of eleven judges, with five judges evaluating synchronization and three judges evaluating execution of each individual diver. For each dive, each judge gave a score between 0 and 10 with 0.5 point increments. The top and bottom synchronization scores and the top and bottom execution scores for each diver were discarded. The remaining five scores were summed, multiplied by 3/5, and multiplied by the degree of difficulty to give a dive score. The six dive scores were summed to give the score for the round.

== Schedule ==
All times are Japan standard time (UTC+9)

Date	Time	Round
28 July 2021	15:00	Final

== Qualification ==
The top 3 teams at the 2019 World Aquatics Championships earned a quota spot for their NOC. Japan, as the host country, was guaranteed a quota spot. The next 4 teams at the 2020 FINA World Cup also received a quota spot. Divers must be at least 14 years old by the end of 2020 to compete.

== Results ==
Rank	Divers	Nation	Final						
Rank	Divers	Nation	Dive 1	Dive 2	Dive 3	Dive 4	Dive 5	Dive 6	Points
1st place, gold medalist(s)	Wang Zongyuan; Xie Siyi	China	55.80	57.60	86.70	90.78	77.76	99.18	467.82
2nd place, silver medalist(s)	Andrew Capobianco; Michael Hixon	United States	49.20	49.80	83.64	86.10	86.70	88.92	444.36
3rd place, bronze medalist(s)	Patrick Hausding; Lars Rüdiger	Germany	50.40	51.60	75.48	70.35	71.40	85.50	404.73
4	Yahel Castillo; Juan Celaya	Mexico	48.60	49.80	78.54	79.56	77.52	66.12	400.14
5	Sho Sakai; Ken Terauchi	Japan	51.60	51.60	74.70	69.30	71.40	75.33	393.93
6	Lorenzo Marsaglia; Giovanni Tocci	Italy	49.20	49.20	73.47	80.58	67.26	68.34	388.05
7	Jack Laugher; Daniel Goodfellow	Great Britain	47.40	51.00	63.24	67.20	62.70	91.26	382.80
8	Evgeny Kuznetsov; Nikita Shleikher	ROC	51.00	51.60	74.46	82.62	71.40	0.00	331.08
