= Hazuki Miyamoto =

Japanese diver (born 2000)

Personal information
- Full name: 宮本 葉月
- Nationality: Japanese
- Born: 25 December 2000 (age 25) Kōchi city, Kōchi Prefecture, Japan

Sport
- Sport: Diving

Hazuki Miyamoto (born 25 December 2000; Japanese: 宮本葉月) is a Japanese diver.

== Career ==
Hazuki represented Japan at the 2018 Asian Games which was her debut appearance at the Asian Games and competed in the women's 3 metre springboard and in the women's synchronized 3 metre springboard events. She also competed at the 2019 World Aquatics Championships in the women's synchronized 3 metre springboard event. She also took part at the 2021 FINA Diving World Cup.

She represented Japan at the 2020 Summer Olympics which also marked her debut appearance at the Olympics. She competed alongside Haruka Enomoto in the women's synchronized 3 metre springboard category during the 2020 Summer Olympics where the duo finished at fifth position.
