= Anna Konanykhina =

Russian diver (born 2004)

Personal information
- Born: 10 September 2004 (age 21) Saint Petersburg, Russia

Sport
- Country: Russia
- Sport: Diving
Medal record
Women's diving
Representing Neutral Athletes B
World Championships
Bronze medal – third place	2025 Singapore	10 m mixed synchro
Representing Russia
European Championships
Gold medal – first place	2020 Budapest	10 m platform

Anna Aleksandrovna Konanykhina (Russian: Анна Александровна Конаныхина; born 10 September 2004) is a Russian diver. In 2021, she won the gold medal in the women's 10 m platform event at the 2020 European Aquatics Championships held in Budapest, Hungary.

In May 2021, she also competed in the 2021 FINA Diving World Cup held in Tokyo, Japan.

In August 2021, she competed in the women's 10 metre platform event at the 2020 Summer Olympics held in Tokyo, Japan.
