= Diving at the 2020 Summer Olympics – Women's synchronized 10 metre platform =

Women's synchronized 10 metre platform at the Games of the XXXII Olympiad
- Venue: Tokyo Aquatics Centre
- Date: 27 July 2021

Medalists
1st place, gold medalist(s)		Chen Yuxi; Zhang Jiaqi	China
2nd place, silver medalist(s)		Jessica Parratto; Delaney Schnell	United States
3rd place, bronze medalist(s)		Gabriela Agundez; Alejandra Orozco	Mexico

The women's 10 metre synchronized platform diving competition at the 2020 Summer Olympics in Tokyo was held on 27 July 2021 at the Tokyo Aquatics Centre. It was the 6th appearance of the event, which has been held at every Olympic Games since the 2000 Summer Olympics.

== Competition format ==
The competition was held in a single round, consisting of each pair performing five dives. Each dive must be from a different one of the six groups (forward, back, reverse, inward, twisting, and armstand). The first two dives were given a fixed degree of difficulty of 2.0, regardless of the dive performed. The other three dives were assigned a degree of difficulty based on somersaults, position, twists, approach, and entry. There was no limit to the degree of difficulty of dives; the most difficult dives calculated in the FINA rulebook (reverse 4 1/2 somersault in pike position and armstand reverse 4 somersault in pike position) were 4.8, but competitors could attempt more difficult dives. Scoring was done by a panel of eleven judges, with five judges evaluating synchronization and three judges evaluating execution of each individual diver. For each dive, each judge gave a score between 0 and 10 with 0.5 point increments. The top and bottom synchronization scores and the top and bottom execution scores for each diver were discarded. The remaining five scores were summed, multiplied by 3/5, and multiplied by the degree of difficulty to give a dive score. The five dive scores were summed to give the score for the round.

== Schedule ==
All times are Japan standard time (UTC+9)

Date	Time	Round
27 July 2021	15:00	Final

== Qualification ==
The top 3 teams at the 2019 World Aquatics Championships earned a quota spot for their NOC. Japan, as the host country, was guaranteed a quota spot. The next 4 teams at the 2020 FINA World Cup also received a quota spot. Divers must be at least 14 years old by the end of 2020 to compete.

== Results ==
Rank	Divers	Nation	Final					
Rank	Divers	Nation	Dive 1	Dive 2	Dive 3	Dive 4	Dive 5	Points
1st place, gold medalist(s)	Chen Yuxi; Zhang Jiaqi	China	53.40	57.60	81.90	86.40	84.48	363.78
2nd place, silver medalist(s)	Delaney Schnell; Jessica Parratto	United States	45.00	46.80	70.20	70.08	78.72	310.80
3rd place, bronze medalist(s)	Gabriela Agundez; Alejandra Orozco	Mexico	47.40	43.80	69.30	68.16	71.04	299.70
4	Meaghan Benfeito; Caeli McKay	Canada	49.20	51.60	71.04	51.48	75.84	299.16
5	Tina Punzel; Christina Wassen	Germany	46.80	47.40	69.12	58.50	71.04	292.86
6	Matsuri Arai; Minami Itahashi	Japan	46.20	48.00	64.68	71.10	61.44	291.42
7	Eden Cheng; Lois Toulson	Great Britain	43.20	47.40	58.50	71.04	69.12	289.26
8	Pandelela Rinong; Leong Mun Yee	Malaysia	50.40	49.80	54.90	64.32	58.56	277.98
