= Wang Zongyuan =

Chinese diver (born 2001)

Wang Zongyuan 王宗源
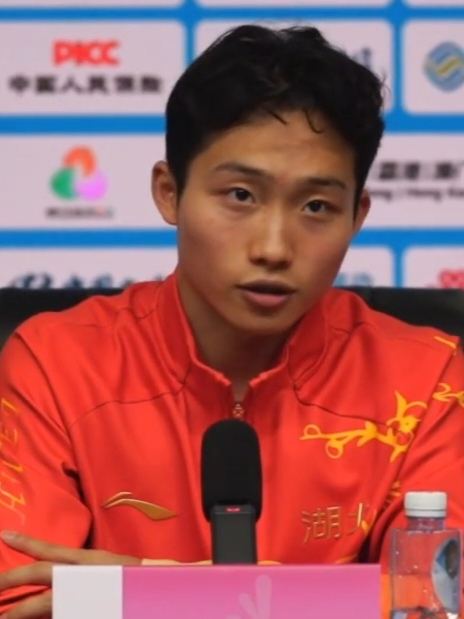
- Wang in 2025

Personal information
- Nationality: Chinese
- Born: 24 October 2001 (age 24) Xiangfan, China
- Height: 5 ft 6 in (168 cm)

Sport
- Country: China
- Sport: Diving
Medal record
Men's diving
Representing China
Olympic Games
Gold medal – first place	2020 Tokyo	3 m synchro
Gold medal – first place	2024 Paris	3 m synchro
Silver medal – second place	2020 Tokyo	3 m springboard
Silver medal – second place	2024 Paris	3 m springboard
World Championships
Gold medal – first place	2019 Gwangju	1 m springboard
Gold medal – first place	2022 Budapest	1 m springboard
Gold medal – first place	2022 Budapest	3 m springboard
Gold medal – first place	2022 Budapest	3 m synchro
Gold medal – first place	2023 Fukuoka	3 m synchro
Gold medal – first place	2023 Fukuoka	3 m springboard
Gold medal – first place	2024 Doha	3 m synchro
Gold medal – first place	2024 Doha	3 m springboard
Gold medal – first place	2025 Singapore	3 m synchro
Bronze medal – third place	2025 Singapore	3 m springboard
Asian Games
Gold medal – first place	2022 Hangzhou	1 m springboard
Gold medal – first place	2026 Aichi–Nagoya	1 m springboard
Gold medal – first place	2026 Aichi–Nagoya	3 m springboard
Gold medal – first place	2026 Aichi–Nagoya	3 m synchro
Gold medal – first place	2022 Hangzhou	3 m springboard

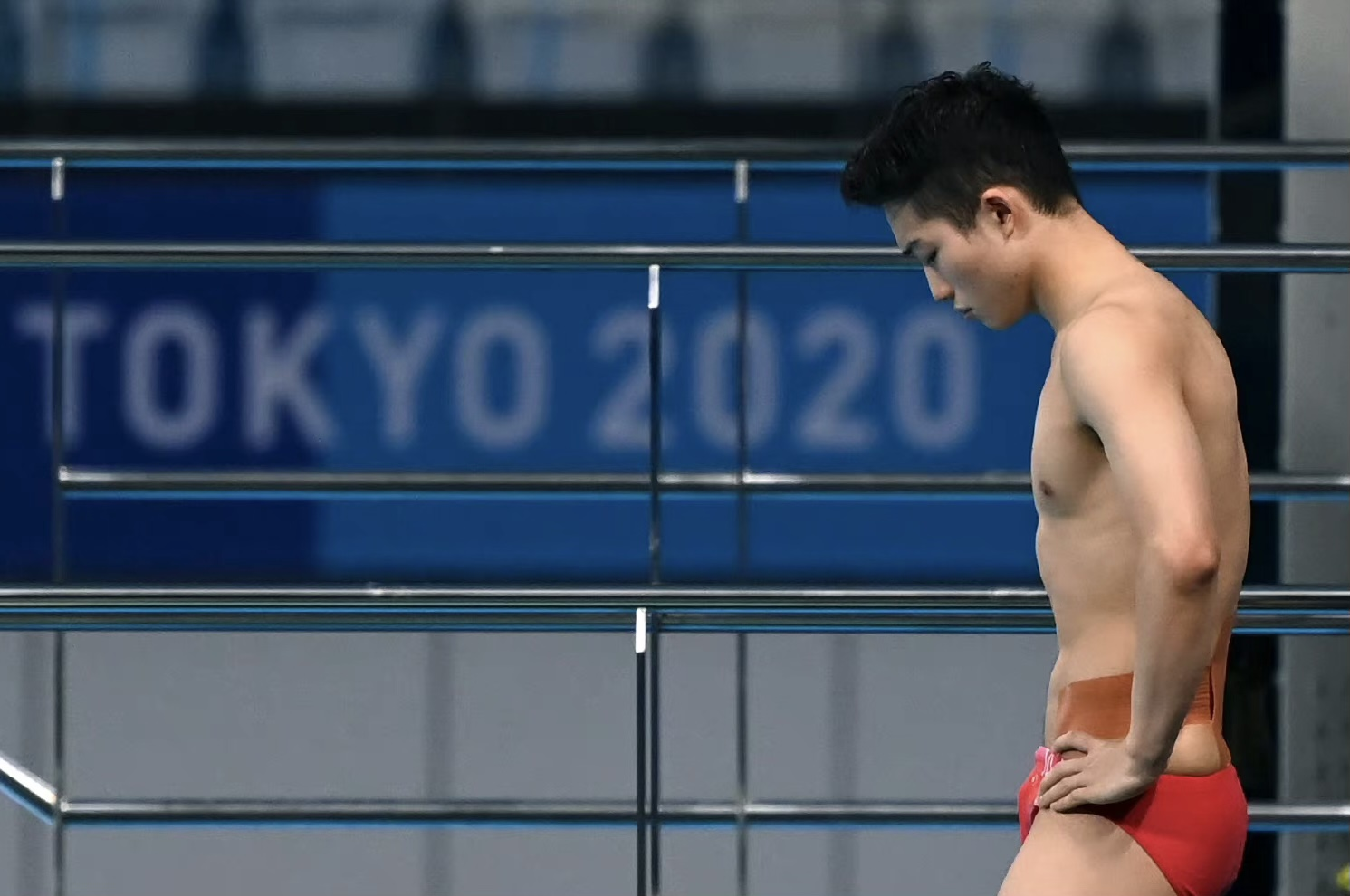
Wang at the 2020 Summer Olympics

Wang Zongyuan (Chinese: 王宗源; pinyin: Wáng Zōngyuán; born 24 October 2001) is a Chinese diver.

== Career ==
Wang competed in the 2019 World Aquatics Championships and won gold in the 1 metre springboard. He also competed at the Tokyo 2020 Summer Olympics and won gold in the Men's 3m synchro event with Xie Siyi and the silver in the 3m springboard. At the 2024 Summer Olympics in Paris, Wang won gold with Long Daoyi in the 3 m synchro event.
