= Shi Tingmao =

Chinese diver (born 1991)

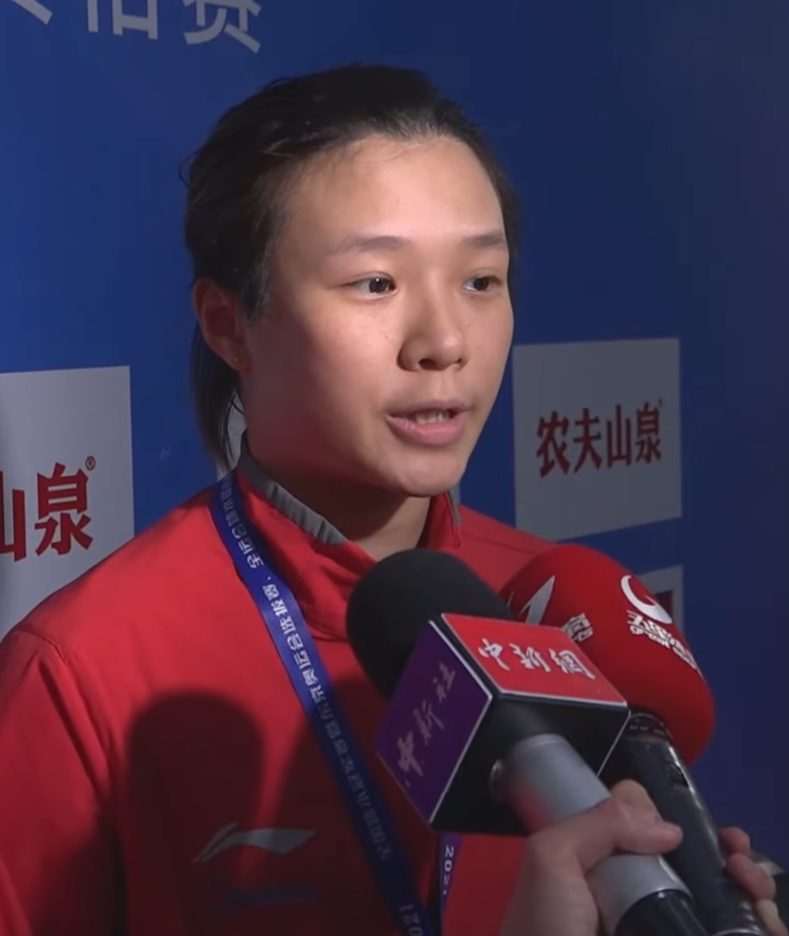
- Shi in 2021

Personal information
- Nationality: Chinese
- Born: 31 August 1991 (age 34) Chongqing, China
- Height: 1.60 m (5 ft 3 in)
- Weight: 52 kg (115 lb)

Sport
- Country: China
- Sport: Diving
- Event(s): 1 m, 3 m, 3 m synchro
- Club: Chongqing
Medal record
Women's diving
Representing China
| Event | 1st | 2nd | 3rd |
|---|---|---|---|
| Olympic Games | 4 | 0 | 0 |
| World Championships | 8 | 1 | 0 |
| Summer Universiade | 2 | 0 | 0 |
| Asian Games | 5 | 1 | 0 |
| FINA Diving World Cup | 6 | 0 | 0 |
| Total | 25 | 2 | 0 |
Olympic Games
| Gold medal – first place | 2016 Rio de Janeiro | 3 m springboard |
| Gold medal – first place | 2016 Rio de Janeiro | 3 m synchro |
| Gold medal – first place | 2020 Tokyo | 3m Springboard |
| Gold medal – first place | 2020 Tokyo | 3 m synchro |
World Championships
| Gold medal – first place | 2011 Shanghai | 1 m springboard |
| Gold medal – first place | 2013 Barcelona | 3 m synchro |
| Gold medal – first place | 2015 Kazan | 3 m springboard |
| Gold medal – first place | 2015 Kazan | 3 m synchro |
| Gold medal – first place | 2017 Budapest | 3 m springboard |
| Gold medal – first place | 2017 Budapest | 3 m synchro |
| Gold medal – first place | 2019 Gwangju | 3 m springboard |
| Gold medal – first place | 2019 Gwangju | 3 m synchro |
| Silver medal – second place | 2015 Kazan | 1 m springboard |
Asian Games
| Gold medal – first place | 2010 Guangzhou | 3 m synchro |
| Gold medal – first place | 2014 Incheon | 1 m springboard |
| Gold medal – first place | 2014 Incheon | 3 m synchro |
| Gold medal – first place | 2018 Jakarta-Palembang | 3 m springboard |
| Gold medal – first place | 2018 Jakarta-Palembang | 3 m synchro |
| Silver medal – second place | 2010 Guangzhou | 3 m springboard |
FINA Diving World Cup
| Gold medal – first place | 2014 Shanghai | 3 m springboard |
| Gold medal – first place | 2014 Shanghai | 3 m synchro |
| Gold medal – first place | 2016 Rio de Janeiro | 3 m springboard |
| Gold medal – first place | 2016 Rio de Janeiro | 3 m synchro |
| Gold medal – first place | 2018 Wuhan | 3 m springboard |
| Gold medal – first place | 2018 Wuhan | 3 m synchro |
Universiade
| Gold medal – first place | 2011 Shenzhen | Team |
| Gold medal – first place | 2011 Shenzhen | 1 m springboard |

Shi Tingmao (Chinese: 施廷懋; pinyin: Shī Tíngmào; born 31 August 1991) is a Chinese diver representing Chongqing diving team. She has been dominant in the 3 metre springboard events in the 2010s. She has won four gold medals in Olympic competitions, two at the 2016 Olympics and two more at the 2020 Olympics. She also holds eight golds in the World Championships.

== Career ==
She won the gold medal in women's 1m springboard at the 2011 World Aquatics Championships in Shanghai, becoming the first Chinese diver from provincial team to participate the World Championships.

At the 2016 Summer Olympics she won the gold medal in women's 3 metre synchronized springboard with Wu Minxia. She also won gold in the 3m Springboard.

At the 2019 World Aquatics Championships held in Gwangju, South Korea, Shi won her third consecutive World Championships gold in the 3m springboard event. She also won gold in the 3m synchro with partner Wang Han.

At the 2020 Summer Olympics, celebrated in 2021, she repeated the 2016 success and won the gold medal in women's 3 metre synchronized springboard with Wang Han. She also won again the gold medal in the 3m Springboard.

== Accolades ==
Shi was named the Best Female Diver of the Year by FINA in six consecutive years from 2015 to 2021.

== Personal life ==
After winning gold in the 2020 Summer Olympics, Shi revealed that she was struggling with depression and considered abandoning professional diving. She joined Naomi Osaka and Simone Biles in openly talking about mental health issues in women's elite competitions.

== Major achievements ==
- 2008 National Diving Championships – (bronze) 3rd 3m Springboard
- 2009 National Diving Championships – (bronze) 3rd 1m Springboard
- 2009 National Games – (bronze) 3rd 1m Springboard; 4th 3m Springboard
- 2010 National Diving Championships – (silver) 2nd 1m springboard
- 2010 Asian Games – (gold) 1st 3m Synchronized Springboard; (silver) 2nd 3m Springboard
- 2011 World Aquatics Championships – (gold) 1st 1m Springboard
- 2013 World Aquatics Championships – (gold) 1st 3m Synchro Springboard (with Wu Minxia)
- 2014 Asian Games – (gold) 1st 1m Springboard; (gold) 1st 3m Synchronized Springboard
- 2015 World Aquatics Championships – (gold) 1st 3m Synchro Springboard (with Wu Minxia)
- 2015 World Aquatics Championships – (gold) 1st 3m Springboard
- 2015 World Aquatics Championships – (silver) 2nd 1m Springboard
- 2016 Summer Olympics – (gold) 1st 3m Synchro Springboard (with Wu Minxia)
- 2016 Summer Olympics – (gold) 1st 3m Springboard
- 2017 World Aquatics Championships – (gold) 1st 3m Synchro Springboard (with Chang Yani)
- 2017 World Aquatics Championships – (gold) 1st 3m Springboard
- 2018 Asian Games – (gold) 1st 3m Women's Springboard
- 2020 Summer Olympics – (gold) 1st 3m Synchro Springboard (with Wang Han)
- 2020 Summer Olympics – (gold) 1st 3m Springboard
