= Diving at the 2020 Summer Olympics – Women's 10 metre platform =

Women's 10 metre platform at the Games of the XXXII Olympiad
- Venue: Tokyo Aquatics Centre
- Date: 4 August 2021 (Preliminary); 5 August 2021 (Semi finals & Finals)
- Competitors: 30 from 20 nations

Medalists
1st place, gold medalist(s)		Quan Hongchan	China
2nd place, silver medalist(s)		Chen Yuxi	China
3rd place, bronze medalist(s)		Melissa Wu	Australia

The women's 10 metre platform diving competition at the 2020 Summer Olympics in Tokyo was held on 4 to 5 August 2021 at the Tokyo Aquatics Centre. It was the 25th appearance of the event, which has been held at every Olympic Games since the 1912 Summer Olympics.

== Competition format ==
The competition will be held in three rounds:

- Preliminary round: All divers perform five dives; the top 18 divers advance to the semi-final.
- Semi-final: The 18 divers perform five dives; the scores of the qualifications are erased and the top 12 divers advance to the final.
- Final: The 12 divers perform five dives; the semi-final scores are erased and the top three divers win the gold, silver and bronze medals accordingly.

Within each round of five dives, each dive must be from a different one of the six groups (forward, back, reverse, inward, twisting, and armstand). Each dive is assigned a degree of difficulty based on somersaults, position, twists, approach, and entry. There is no limit to the degree of difficulty of dives; the most difficult dives calculated in the FINA rulebook (reverse 4 1/2 somersault in pike position and armstand reverse 4 somersault in pike position) are 4.8, but competitors could attempt more difficult dives. Scoring is done by a panel of seven judges. For each dive, each judge gives a score between 0 and 10 with 0.5 point increments. The top two and bottom two scores are discarded. The remaining three scores are summed and multiplied by the degree of difficulty to give a dive score. The five dive scores are summed to give the score for the round.

== Schedule ==
All times are Japan standard time (UTC+9)

Date	Time	Round
4 August 2021	15:00	Preliminary
5 August 2021	10:00; 15:00	Semifinal; Final

== Qualification ==
The top 12 divers at the 2019 World Aquatics Championships earned a quota spot for their NOC. The top diver at each of the 5 continental championships earned a spot (excluding divers who earned a spot at the World Championships and divers from NOCs that had already earned two spots). Additional quota places go to the next best finishers in the 2020 FINA World Cup (with the same limitations) until the maximum number of divers is reached. Divers must be at least 14 years old by the end of 2020 to compete.

== Results ==
Rank	Diver	Nation	Preliminary		Semifinal		Final					
Rank	Diver	Nation	Points	Rank	Points	Rank	Dive 1	Dive 2	Dive 3	Dive 4	Dive 5	Points
1st place, gold medalist(s)	Quan Hongchan	China	364.65	2	415.65	1	82.50	96.00	95.70	96.00	96.00	466.20
2nd place, silver medalist(s)	Chen Yuxi	China	390.70	1	407.75	2	82.50	76.80	85.80	89.10	91.20	425.40
3rd place, bronze medalist(s)	Melissa Wu	Australia	351.20	4	334.50	5	75.00	76.80	64.40	73.60	81.60	371.40
4	Gabriela Agúndez	Mexico	297.65	12	337.30	4	64.50	70.95	73.60	74.25	75.20	358.50
5	Delaney Schnell	United States	360.75	3	342.75	3	76.80	65.60	56.10	79.50	62.40	340.40
6	Alejandra Orozco	Mexico	308.10	9	301.40	12	66.00	57.60	54.45	75.20	68.80	322.05
7	Andrea Spendolini-Sirieix	Great Britain	307.70	10	314.00	8	58.50	60.80	63.00	51.20	72.00	305.50
8	Elena Wassen	Germany	323.80	6	303.70	11	67.20	63.00	60.90	40.00	60.80	291.90
9	Lois Toulson	Great Britain	314.00	7	311.10	9	63.00	37.80	62.40	62.40	64.00	289.60
10	Celine van Duijn	Netherlands	306.80	11	306.45	10	50.40	49.30	60.80	60.00	67.20	287.70
11	Yulia Timoshinina	ROC	313.20	8	319.80	6	46.50	57.75	44.80	49.60	64.35	263.00
12	Pandelela Rinong	Malaysia	284.90	18	315.75	7	18.00	71.05	60.80	52.80	43.20	245.85
13	Meaghan Benfeito	Canada	331.85	5	296.40	13	Did not advance					
14	Sarah Jodoin Di Maria	Italy	291.05	15	294.00	14	Did not advance					
15	Tanya Watson	Ireland	289.40	16	278.15	15	Did not advance					
16	Alaïs Kalonji	France	295.80	14	269.00	16	Did not advance					
17	Katrina Young	United States	286.65	17	263.60	17	Did not advance					
18	Christina Wassen	Germany	297.15	13	237.30	18	Did not advance					
19	Kwon Ha-lim	South Korea	278.00	19	Did not advance							
20	Maha Gouda	Egypt	275.30	20	Did not advance							
21	Nikita Hains	Australia	270.00	21	Did not advance							
22	Matsuri Arai	Japan	268.80	22	Did not advance							
23	Celina Toth	Canada	261.40	23	Did not advance							
24	Ingrid Oliveira	Brazil	261.20	24	Did not advance							
25	Anna Konanykhina	ROC	252.85	25	Did not advance							
26	Cheong Jun Hoong	Malaysia	251.80	26	Did not advance							
27	Noemi Batki	Italy	226.95	27	Did not advance							
28	Anne Tuxen	Norway	219.15	28	Did not advance							
29	Sofiya Lyskun	Ukraine	216.55	29	Did not advance							
30	Freida Lim	Singapore	215.90	30	Did not advance							
