= Cao Yuan =

Chinese diver (born 1995)

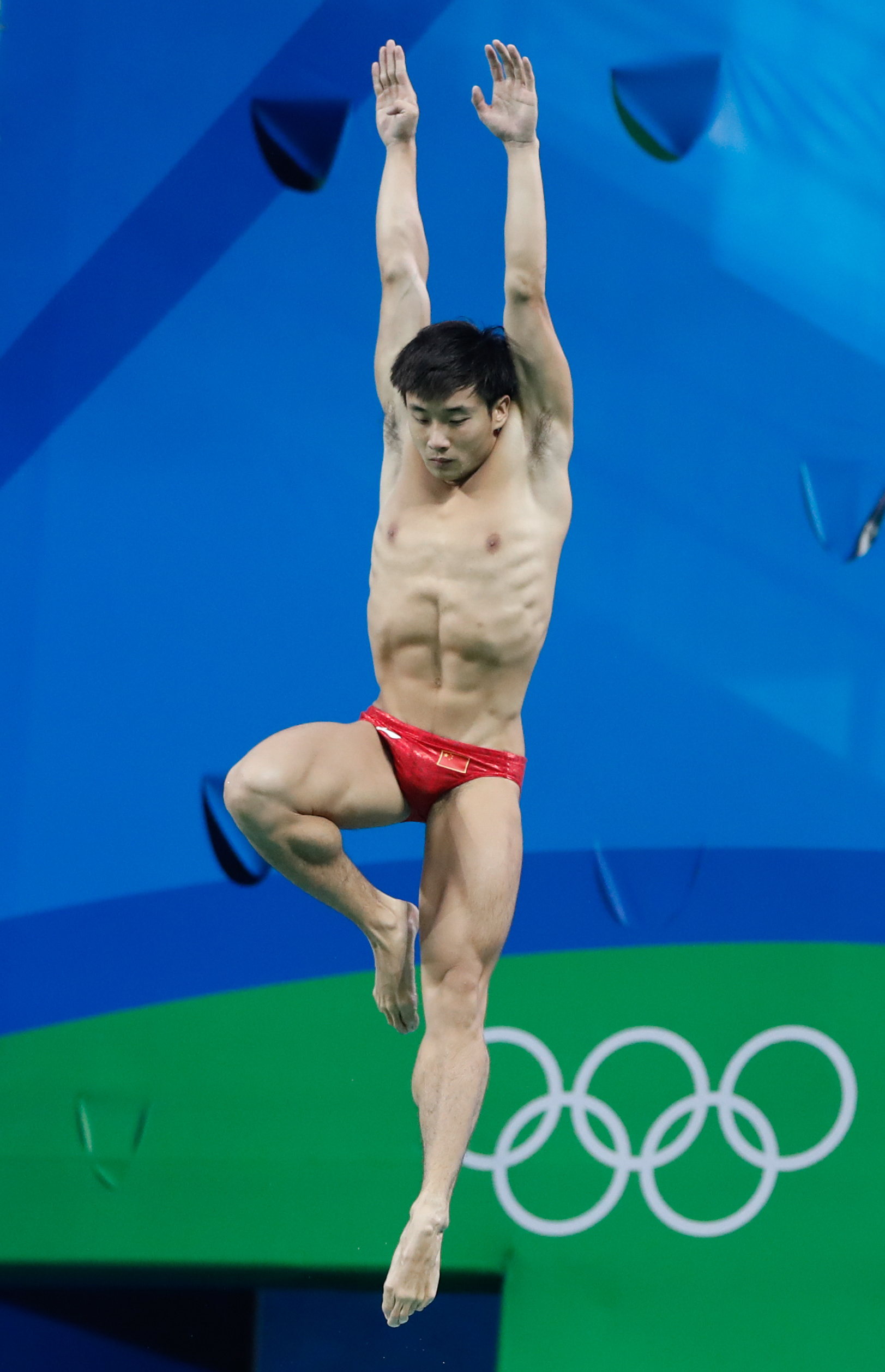
- Cao at the 2016 Summer Olympics

Personal information
- Nationality: China
- Born: 7 February 1995 (age 31) Changsha, China
- Height: 167 cm (5 ft 6 in)
- Weight: 62 kg (137 lb)

Sport
- Country: China
- Sport: Diving
- Event(s): 3 m, 10 m, 3 m & 10 m synchro
- Club: Beijing
Medal record
Men's diving
Representing China
Event	1st	2nd	3rd
Olympic Games	4	1	1
World Championships	5	5	1
FINA Diving World Cup	5	3	0
Asian Games	4	1	0
Total	18	10	2
Olympic Games
Gold medal – first place	2012 London	10 m synchro
Gold medal – first place	2016 Rio de Janeiro	3 m springboard
Gold medal – first place	2020 Tokyo	10 m platform
Gold medal – first place	2024 Paris	10 m platform
Silver medal – second place	2020 Tokyo	10 m synchro
Bronze medal – third place	2016 Rio de Janeiro	3 m synchro
World Championships
Gold medal – first place	2015 Kazan	3 m synchro
Gold medal – first place	2019 Gwangju	3 m synchro
Gold medal – first place	2019 Gwangju	10 m synchro
Gold medal – first place	2022 Budapest	3 m synchro
Gold medal – first place	2025 Singapore	Team
Silver medal – second place	2017 Budapest	3 m synchro
Silver medal – second place	2019 Gwangju	3 m springboard
Silver medal – second place	2022 Budapest	3 m springboard
Silver medal – second place	2024 Doha	10 m platform
Silver medal – second place	2025 Singapore	3 m springboard
Bronze medal – third place	2013 Barcelona	10 m synchro
Asian Games
Gold medal – first place	2018 Jakarta-Palembang	3 m synchro
Gold medal – first place	2014 Busan	3 m springboard
Gold medal – first place	2014 Busan	3 m synchro
Gold medal – first place	2010 Guangzhou	10 m platform
Silver medal – second place	2018 Jakarta-Palembang	3 m springboard

Cao Yuan (Chinese: 曹缘; pinyin: Cáo Yuán; born 7 February 1995) is a Chinese diver and an Olympic gold medalist, having won four golds, one silver and one bronze in the Olympics. He has also won golds in diving at the World Championships and World Cups. Cao is considered the best male diver of all time.

== Early life ==
Cao was born on February 7, 1995 in Hunan province. Cao started diving at age five. His mother wanted him to learn discipline, so she enrolled him in diving classes.

His life motto is "Go your own way and see your own scenery. Be calm for life's ups and downs."

== Career ==
Cao is the only diver in history to win 3 gold medals in a single World Diving Series event by winning gold medals in 3m synchro, 10m synchro, and 10m individual events of the 2014 World Diving Series in Canada.

Cao together with Yue Lin are the only divers to ever win two World Series gold medals on the same day of the competition by winning the 3m synchro and 10m synchro events on 30 May 2014.

In 2015, he partnered with Qin Kai on the men's 3m synchro springboard at the World Championships in Kazan and won gold.

At the 2016 Summer Olympics in Rio, Cao led throughout the competition in the men's 3m springboard event, and won gold with a score of 547.60. He also won bronze in the 3m springboard synchronized dive with Qin Kai.

In 2017, at the World Championships in Budapest, Cao won silver pairing with Xie Siyi in the 3m synchro. In the 2018 World Cup, he won a gold in the 3m synchro with Xie, as well as a silver in the individual 3m springboard.

At the 2019 World Aquatics Championships held in Gwangju, South Korea, Cao won gold in both the men's synchronised diving events. In the 3m synchro with Xie, the pair won with their last two dives, and he also won with Chen Aisen in the 10m synchro.

At the 2020 Summer Olympics in Tokyo, Cao and teammate Aisen Chen won silver in men's synchronized 10m platform. He also won gold in individual 10m platform with 582.35 points.

At the 2024 Summer Olympics in Paris, he won the gold medal at the 10m platform event, capping off China's perfect eight-gold medal performance. Cao became the first athlete since Greg Louganis to win consecutive gold medals in this event.

== Accolades ==
In 2014, he was named the Male Diver of the Year by the International Swimming Federation (FINA). He was again given the accolade in 2018.

He received the 4 May Youth Medal of Beijing in the People's Republic of China in 2014.

== See also ==
- China at the 2012 Summer Olympics
