= Xie Siyi =

Chinese diver

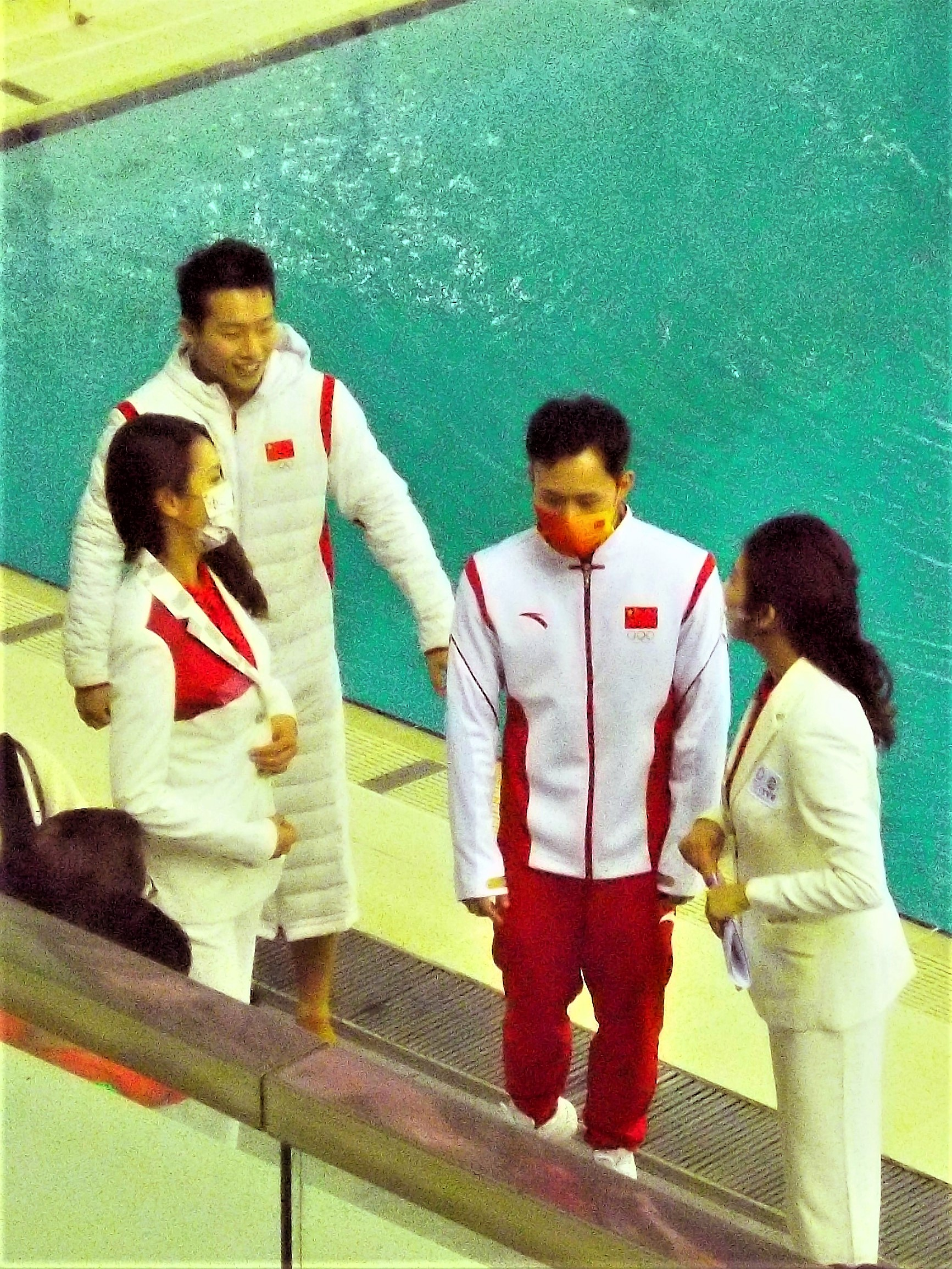
- Xie (second right) in 2021

Personal information
- Nationality: Chinese
- Born: 28 March 1996 (age 30) Shantou, Guangdong, China
- Height: 1.70 m (5 ft 7 in)
- Weight: 68 kg (150 lb)

Sport
- Country: China
- Sport: Diving
- Event(s): 1 m, 3 m, 3 m synchro, 10 m, 10 m synchro
- Club: Guangdong
- Partner: Cao Yuan
- Coached by: Zhou Jihong
Medal record
Men's diving
Representing China
Event	1st	2nd	3rd
Olympic Games	3	0	0
World Championships	4	2	1
FINA Diving World Cup	2	0	0
Asian Games	2	0	0
Total	11	2	1
Olympic Games
Gold medal – first place	2020 Tokyo	3 m springboard
Gold medal – first place	2020 Tokyo	3 m synchro
Gold medal – first place	2024 Paris	3 m springboard
World Championships
Gold medal – first place	2015 Kazan	1 m springboard
Gold medal – first place	2017 Budapest	3 m springboard
Gold medal – first place	2019 Gwangju	3 m springboard
Gold medal – first place	2019 Gwangju	3 m synchro
Silver medal – second place	2017 Budapest	3 m synchro
Silver medal – second place	2024 Doha	3 m springboard
Bronze medal – third place	2015 Kazan	Team
FINA Diving World Cup
Gold medal – first place	2018 Wuhan	3m springboard
Gold medal – first place	2018 Wuhan	3m synchro
Asian Games
Gold medal – first place	2018 Jakarta-Palembang	3 m springboard
Gold medal – first place	2018 Jakarta-Palembang	3 m synchro

Xie Siyi
- Simplified Chinese: 谢思埸
- Traditional Chinese: 謝思埸
Transcriptions
Standard Mandarin
- Hanyu Pinyin: Xiè Sīyì
- IPA: [ɕjê sɹ̩́.î]

Xie Siyi (Chinese: 谢思埸; born 28 March 1996) is a Chinese diver. He has won four gold medals at the World Championships and three Olympic gold medals.

== Career ==
Xie's previous main event was 10m platform and his partner was Chen Aisen. However, due to a serious injury in 2012, he began focusing more on springboard. At the 2015 World Aquatics Championships, he became a new world champion after winning the gold medal of 1m springboard. He also won a gold in 3m springboard at the 2017 World Aquatics Championships held in Budapest.

In 2018, Xie took part in his first World Cup event held in Wuhan, and won a gold in the 3m synchro partnered with Cao Yuan, as well as a gold in the individual 3m event.

At the 2019 World Aquatics Championships held in Gwangju, South Korea, he again won gold in the 3m springboard event. Xie again partnered with Cao Yuan in the 3m synchro, and won gold with their last dive.

At the 2020 Tokyo Olympics, Xie won the gold in the 3m springboard event. He scored over 85 points with each of his six dives to reach a total score of 558.75 and broke the Men's Olympics 3m springboard record. He also partnered with Wang Zongyuan in the men's 3m synchro event and the pair won gold.

After the Tokyo Olympics, Xie announced his retirement from the Chinese national diving team. He subsequently returned to the sport two years later after spending his time completing a master’s degree and participating in youth coaching.

At the 2024 Paris Olympics, Xie won gold again in the 3m springboard event with a score of 543.60, surpassing his compatriot, Wang Zongyuan, who took the silver.
