= Wang Han (diver) =

Chinese diver (born 1991)

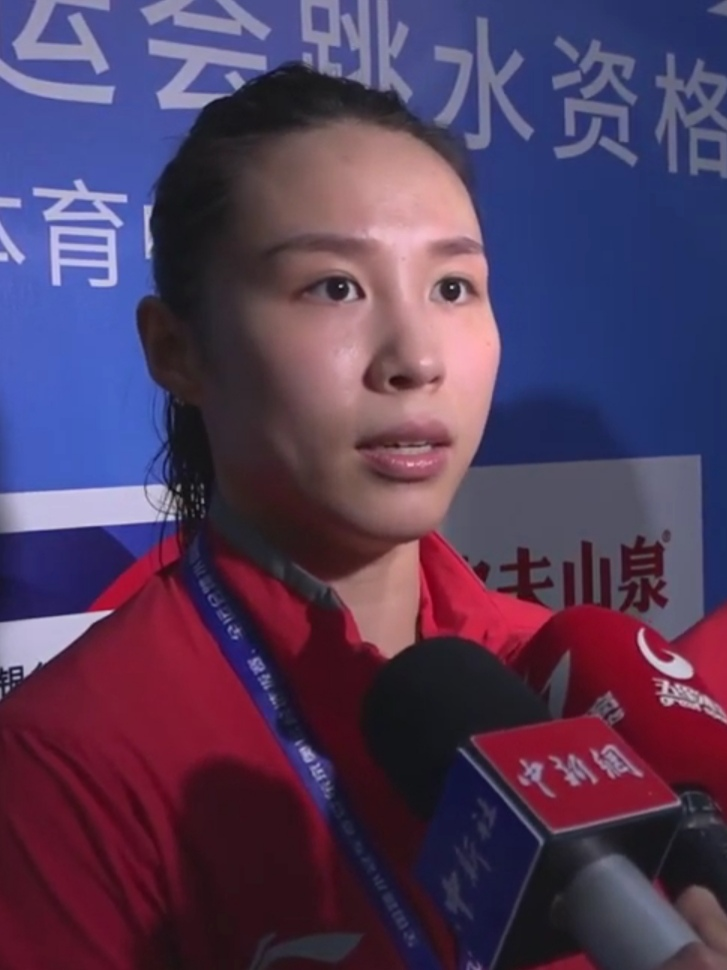

Personal information
- Nationality: Chinese
- Born: 24 January 1991 (age 35) Baoding, Hebei, China
- Height: 1.63 m (5 ft 4 in)
- Weight: 56 kg (123 lb)

Sport
- Country: China
- Sport: Diving
- Event(s): 1 m, 3 m, 3 m synchro
- Club: Hebei Province
Medal record
Women's Diving
Representing China
Olympic Games
Gold medal – first place	2020 Tokyo	3 m synchro
Silver medal – second place	2020 Tokyo	3m Springboard
World Championships
Gold medal – first place	2015 Kazan	3 m mixed synchro
Gold medal – first place	2017 Budapest	3 m mixed synchro
Gold medal – first place	2019 Gwangju	3 m synchro
Silver medal – second place	2011 Shanghai	1 m springboard
Silver medal – second place	2013 Barcelona	3 m springboard
Silver medal – second place	2017 Budapest	3 m springboard
Silver medal – second place	2019 Gwangju	3 m springboard
Bronze medal – third place	2009 Rome	1 m springboard
Bronze medal – third place	2013 Barcelona	1 m springboard
Asian Games
Gold medal – first place	2010 Guangzhou	3 m springboard synchro
Gold medal – first place	2018 Jakarta-Palembang	1 m springboard
Silver medal – second place	2014 Incheon	1 m springboard
Silver medal – second place	2018 Jakarta-Palembang	3 m springboard
Universiade
Gold medal – first place	2011 Shenzhen	Team
Gold medal – first place	2011 Shenzhen	3 m synchro
Silver medal – second place	2011 Shenzhen	3 m springboard

Wang Han (Chinese: 王涵; pinyin: Wáng Hán; born 24 January 1991) is a Chinese retired diver who specialises in the 1 meter and 3 meter springboard events. Wang won a silver medal in the 1 meter springboard event at the 2011 World Aquatics Championships.

== Early life ==
Wang was born on 24 January 1991 in Baoding, Hebei. At the age of 4, she entered the Baoding Sports Kindergarten and began to practice gymnastics. In 2000, following her selection by the Hebei diving team coach, she began to practice diving.

== Sports career ==
In 2005, Wang won the women's single 10-meter platform diving championship at the Asian Swimming Championships. In 2008, she was selected for the Chinese National Diving Team. In 2010, Wang won the women's synchronized 3-meter springboard championship at the 2010 Asian Games in Guangzhou and in 2013, she won the women's double 3-meter springboard championship in diving at the 12th National Games of China in Liaoning.

In 2015, she won the mixed 3-meter springboard in the diving at the 16th FINA World Championships in Kazan. In 2018, Wang won the women's 1-meter springboard championship at the 18th Asian Games in Jakarta and in 2019, she and Shi Tingmao won the women's synchronized 3-meter springboard championship in diving at the 18th FINA World Aquatics Championships in Gwangju.

At the 2020 Summer Olympics in Tokyo, Wang and Shi Tingmao won the gold medal in the women's synchronized 3-meter springboard. In the women's single 3-meter springboard, she won the silver medal.

On 5 April 2022, Wang announced her retirement from international competition. On the same month, she became the coach of the Hebei diving team.

== Awards and honours ==
- On 9 August 2021, the Chinese Communist Youth League and the All-China Youth Federation awarded 39 young athletes, including Wang, the China Youth May Fourth Medal (China Youth Wusi Medal).
- On 11 August 2021, the All-China Women's Federation awarded Wang the honor of National March 8 Red Banner Bearer.
- On 3 April 2022, Wang was again awarded the China Youth May Fourth Medal by the Chinese Communist Youth League and the All-China Youth Federation on the occasion of the 100th anniversary of the founding of the Youth League.
