= Zhang Jiaqi (diver) =

Chinese diver (born 2004)

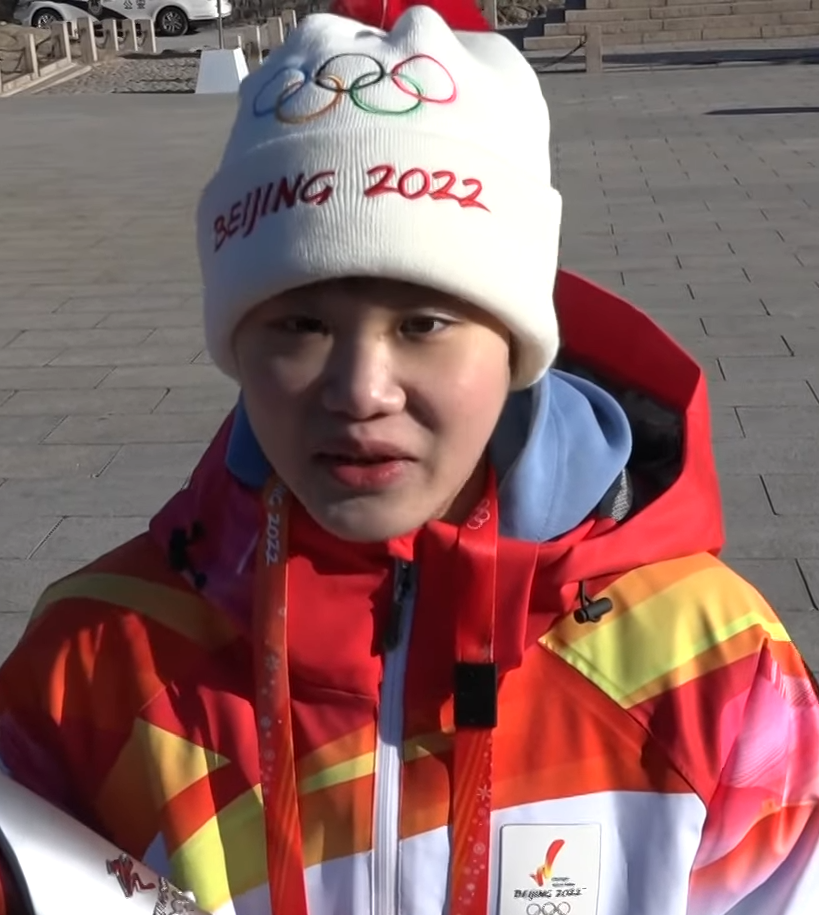

Personal information
- Native name: 张家齐
- Nationality: Chinese
- Born: 28 May 2004 (age 22) Beijing, China

Sport
- Country: China
- Sport: Diving
- Event(s): 10 m, 10 m synchro
Medal record
Women's diving
Representing China
Event	1st	2nd	3rd
Olympic Games	1	0	0
World Championships	3	0	0
FINA Diving World Cup	2	0	0
Total	6	0	0
Olympic Games
Gold medal – first place	2020 Tokyo	10 m synchro
World Championships
Gold medal – first place	2019 Gwangju	10 m synchro
Gold medal – first place	2023 Fukuoka	10 m mixed synchro
Gold medal – first place	2024 Doha	10 m mixed synchro
Asian Games
Gold medal – first place	2018 Jakarta-Palembang	10 m synchro
Silver medal – second place	2018 Jakarta-Palembang	10 m platform
World Cup
Gold medal – first place	2018 Wuhan	10 m platform
Gold medal – first place	2018 Wuhan	10 m synchro
World University Games
Gold medal – first place	2021 Chengdu	10 m synchro
Gold medal – first place	2021 Chengdu	Team

Zhang Jiaqi (simplified Chinese: 张家齐; traditional Chinese: 張家齊; pinyin: Zhāng Jiāqí; born 28 May 2004) is a Chinese diver. She won the gold medals of women's 10m platform and women's 10m synchronised platform in the 2018 FINA Diving World Cup.

== Sports career ==
In 2008, Zhang was sent by her mother to a gymnastics club in Dongcheng District of Beijing for gymnastics training. But after practicing for a period of time, she was retired by the coach as she was deemed not fit to do gymnastics. As a result, Zhang was sent to the diving club of the General Administration of Sport of China to learn swimming and diving.

In 2010, the Beijing diving team went to the club where Zhang was located to select young athletes. Zhang, who was less than seven years old, was selected in the second team of the Beijing diving team and officially began professional diving training. In 2014, she entered the first team of the Beijing diving team.

On 8 May 2016, she won the finals of the National Diving Championships women's single meter platform with 408.55 points.

On 24 February 2017, at the FINA Diving Grand Prix in Germany, Zhang won the silver medal in the women's singles 10-meter platform runner-up with 352.3 points. On 26 February, Zhang and her partner Zhang Minjie won the women's doubles at 10-meter platform with 327.84 points. On 14 May, Zhang won the finals of the women's singles 10-meter platform of the National Diving Championship with 413.3 points.

On 18 May, during the women's individual all-around competition, Zhang was as a runner-up with 700.8 points. On 22 August, in the 13th National Games diving competition, Zhang Jiaqi and her partner Zhang Minjie won the women's double 10-meter platform championship with 356.58 points, On 25 August at the 13th National Games Women's Single 10, Zhang Jiaqi scored three full points in the final jump and finally won the championship with 427.45 points. At the 2018 Asian Games, Zhang and Zhang Minjie won the gold medal at the women's 10m synchro platform.

At the same time, she also finished her first National Games with two championships. In June 2018, at the 2018 FINA Diving World Cup in Wuhan, Zhang won gold medals in the women's 10m platform with 427.30 points and women's 10 m synchro with 366.12 points alongside Zhang Minjie. On 4 November, at the FINA Diving Grand Prix in Singapore, Zhang won the women's singles 10m platform with 400.75 points.

At the 2020 Summer Olympics, she won the gold medal together with Chen Yuxi in the synchronized 10 metre platform event.

At the 2021 National Games of China in Shaanxi, Zhang won the silver medal in the women's single 10m platform, while representing the Beijing diving team on 6 September. On 9 September, she and Chen Yuxi won the gold medal in the women's 10m platform.

On 22 November 2025, she announced her retirement at age 21.

== Awards and honors ==
- Best Athlete in the Summary Conference of the Beijing Sports Delegation to the 13th National Games (12 October 2017)
- China Youth May Fourth Medal (9 August 2021)
- Advanced Worker of National Sports System (29 August 2021)
- National 1 May Labour Medal (September 2021)
- China Youth May Fourth Medal (2022)

== Other activities ==
On 19 November 2021, Zhang and French footballer Kylian Mbappé became godmother and godfather respectively to two baby pandas at Beauval Zoo in Paris, as part of the campaign to create publicity and awareness for the species.

On 26 December 2021, the music video for 2022 Winter Olympics "See You in Beijing" sung by 55 Olympic champions, including Zhang Jiaqi, was released.

On 31 December 2021, she participated in the "2022 Winter Olympics BRTV Global New Year's Eve Ice and Snow Festival", where sang the classic song "My Motherland and Me" with Cai Xukun and Zhang Ye.

On 3 February 2022, Zhang served as the third torchbearer at the Badaling section of the Great Wall during the 2022 Winter Olympics torch relay.

On 24 February 2022, Zhang was among the list of the candidates who passed the preliminary examination for the admission of outstanding athletes at the Beijing Sports University. In April 2022, she was selected for the Undergraduate Recommended List of Outstanding Athletes. Zhang announced her intention to proceed with her higher studies at the Beijing Sports University.
