= Jennifer Abel =

Canadian diver (born 1991)

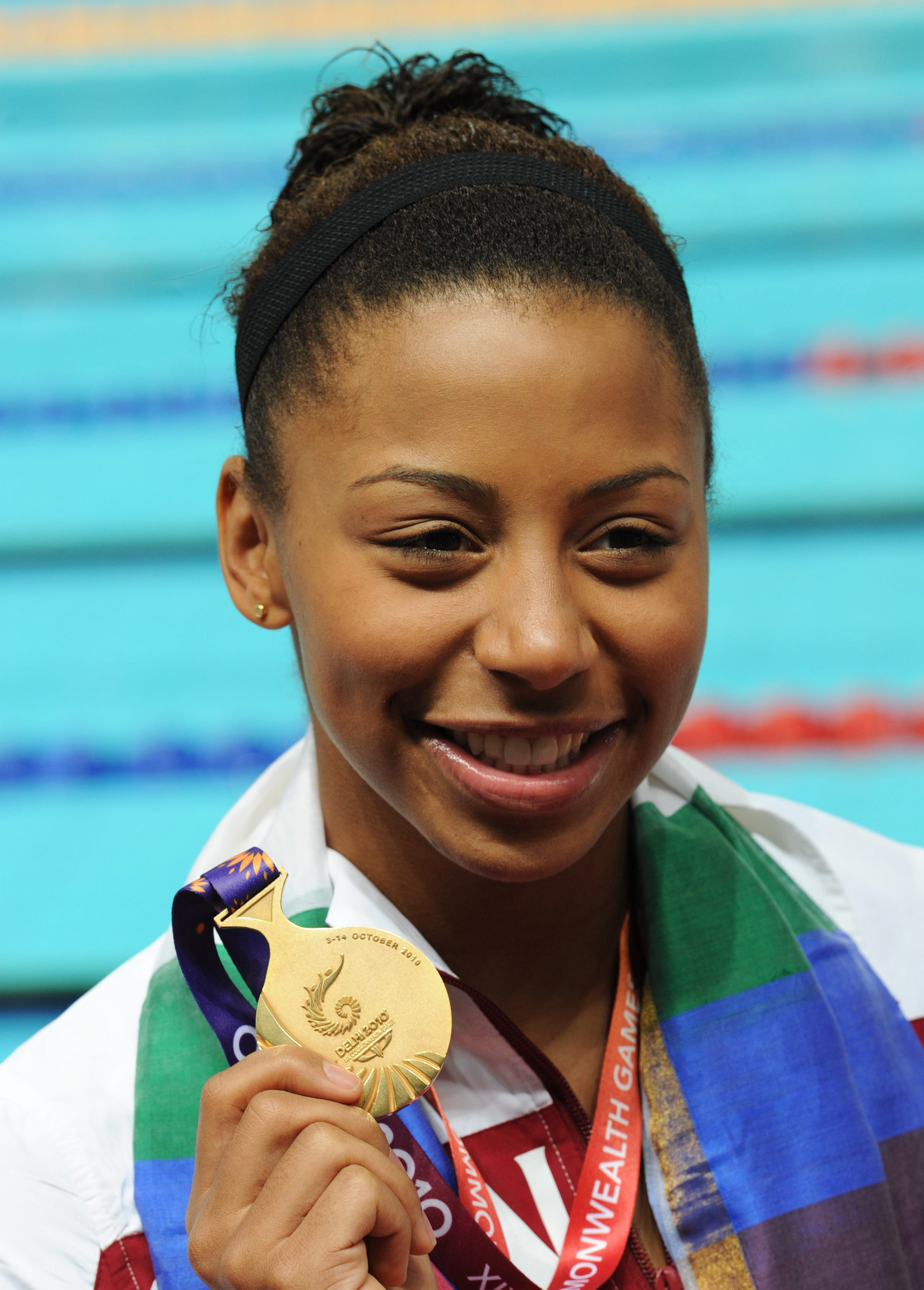
- Abel at the 2010 Commonwealth Games

Personal information
- Born: August 23, 1991 (age 34) Montreal, Quebec, Canada
- Home town: Laval, Quebec, Canada
- Height: 1.60 m (5 ft 3 in)
- Weight: 59 kg (130 lb)

Sport
- Country: Canada
- Sport: Diving
- Events: 3 m, 3 m synchro
- Club: Pointe-Claire Diving Club
- Partners: Mélissa Citrini-Beaulieu; François Imbeau-Dulac
- Former partners: Émilie Heymans; Pamela Ware
- Coached by: Arturo Miranda
Medal record
Representing Canada
Event	1st	2nd	3rd
Olympic Games	0	1	1
World Championships	0	6	4
Commonwealth Games	4	3	0
Pan American Games	3	2	0
Total	7	12	5
Olympic Games
Silver medal – second place	2020 Tokyo	3 m synchro
Bronze medal – third place	2012 London	3 m synchro
World Championships
Silver medal – second place	2011 Shanghai	3 m synchro
Silver medal – second place	2015 Kazan	3 m synchro
Silver medal – second place	2015 Kazan	3 m mixed synchro
Silver medal – second place	2017 Budapest	3 m synchro
Silver medal – second place	2019 Gwangju	3 m synchro
Silver medal – second place	2019 Gwangju	3 m mixed synchro
Bronze medal – third place	2011 Shanghai	3 m springboard
Bronze medal – third place	2013 Barcelona	3 m synchro
Bronze medal – third place	2017 Budapest	3 m springboard
Bronze medal – third place	2017 Budapest	3 m mixed synchro
Commonwealth Games
Gold medal – first place	2010 Delhi	1 m springboard
Gold medal – first place	2010 Delhi	3 m synchro
Gold medal – first place	2014 Glasgow	1 m springboard
Gold medal – first place	2018 Gold Coast	3 m springboard
Silver medal – second place	2010 Delhi	3 m springboard
Silver medal – second place	2014 Glasgow	3 m springboard
Silver medal – second place	2014 Glasgow	3 m synchro
Pan American Games
Gold medal – first place	2015 Toronto	3 m springboard
Gold medal – first place	2019 Lima	3 m synchro
Gold medal – first place	2019 Lima	3 m springboard
Silver medal – second place	2011 Guadalajara	3 m synchro
Silver medal – second place	2015 Toronto	3 m synchro

Jennifer Abel (born August 23, 1991) is a Canadian former diver. She is currently partnered with Mélissa Citrini-Beaulieu for synchronized diving. She won an Olympic bronze medal at the 2012 Summer Olympics in the 3 m synchro diving event with Émilie Heymans and a silver medal at the 2020 Summer Olympics in the same event with Melissa Citrini-Beaulieu. Abel is a four-time Commonwealth Games champion in the 1 m and 3 m synchronized springboard. And is also a three-time Pan American Games champion in the 3 m springboard and 3 m synchronized springboard. Her ten medals (six silver, four bronze) at the FINA World Championships are a record for most medals by a Canadian in diving at the world championships.

== Career ==
Abel became one of Canada's youngest ever divers when she had her debut Olympics at the age of 16 in the 2008 Summer Olympics. Though failing to win a medal at the Olympic Games that year, Abel did achieve success together with partner Emilie Heymans on the Grand Prix circuit, winning several medals. Their work together would continue after that, and Abel would gain from Heymans' experience which would build through to more Grand Prix medals through to 2010.

She became the 2010 Commonwealth Games champion in both the 1 m springboard and the 3 m synchro springboard with Émilie Heymans, as well as holding a 2010 Commonwealth silver in the 3 m springboard. After her positive results she said that "This was my first Commonwealth Games and I didn't expect to win so many medals. It shows I'm on the right track for the Olympics." In 2011, Abel also achieved a bronze medal and a silver medal from the world championships in the 3 m springboard and the 3 m synchro again with Heymans. She then went on to win a silver with Heymans at the 2011 Pan American Games in the 3-metre synchro event. For the year of 2011, Abel was named the Aquatic Federation of Canada's female athlete of the year.

At the 2012 Summer Olympics, she won a bronze medal, with her partner Heymans, in the 3 m springboard synchronized diving event. On winning her first Olympic medal at the age of 20, Abel said "Since the beginning of the year we’ve been really nervous about that moment. I think it takes time to just calm down and just realize it."

Abel competed at the 2014 Commonwealth Games, she and partner Pamela Ware won the silver medal in 3 m synchro springboard. She next competed in the 1 m springboard where she won the gold medal. Abel finished with a silver medal in the 3 m single springboard event, completing a three medal games for her. At the 2016 Summer Olympics Abel finished a frustrating fourth in both the solo and synchro 3 m springboard events.

Following her disappointing results at the 2016 Olympics, Abel began competing with new partner Mélissa Citrini-Beaulieu. At the 2017 World Aquatics Championships they partnered to a silver medal together in their first year in the women's 3-metre synchro springboard event. Abel also partnered with François Imbeau-Dulac in the mixed 3-metre synchro springboard where they won bronze. Individually, Abel also won a bronze medal at these Championships, diving to bronze medal in the 3-metre springboard. With these three medals Abel tied Alexandre Despatie for the most medals by a Canadian at the FINA World Championships. At the 2018 Commonwealth Games, Abel won the women's 3 m springboard event.

She qualified to represent Canada at the 2020 Summer Olympics. In Tokyo, Abel and partner Melissa Citrini-Beaulieu were silver medalists in the 3 m springboard event.

Abel officially announced her retirement after the Tokyo Olympics.

== Personal life ==
Abel is of Haitian descent. She is in a relationship with David Lemieux, former IBF middleweight boxing champion. Lemieux proposed to Abel on her return from the 2020 Summer Olympics and they are now engaged. They have 2 children. They also have 2 children from Lemieux's first marriage.

== See also ==
- List of Canadian sports personalities
