= Diving at the 2015 Pan American Games – Women's 10 metre platform =

Women's 10 metre platform at the 2015 Pan American Games
- Venue: CIBC Pan Am/Parapan Am Aquatics Centre and Field House
- Dates: July 10 - July 11
- Competitors: 8 from 4 nations
- Winning score: 383.20

Medalists
Gold medal	Paola Espinosa	Mexico
Silver medal	Roseline Filion	Canada
Bronze medal	Meaghan Benfeito	Canada

The women's 10 metre platform competition of the diving events at the 2015 Pan American Games was held between the 10 and 11 of July at the CIBC Pan Am/Parapan Am Aquatics Centre and Field House in Toronto, Canada. The winner of the competition qualified his country a quota place for the 2016 Summer Olympics in Rio de Janeiro, Brazil. If the host nation of the Olympics wins the event, the runner up will qualify instead.

The individual diving competitions all consist of two rounds. In the first, the divers each perform five dives. All divers advance to the finals. In the final round, the divers perform a final set of five dives, with the scores from those dives (and only those dives) used to determine final ranking.

Seven judges evaluate each dive, giving the diver a score between 0 and 10 with increments of 0.5; scores below 7.0 or above 9.5 are rare. The two highest and two lowest scores from each judge are dropped. The remaining three scores are summed, and multiplied by the degree of difficulty of the dive to give the total score for the dive. Scores from each dive in the round are summed to give the round score.

== Schedule ==
Date	Time	Round
July 10, 2015	13:30	Preliminaries
July 11, 2015	20:00	Finals

== Results ==
Green denotes finalists

Rank	Diver	Nationality	Preliminary		Final	
Rank	Diver	Nationality	Points	Rank	Points	Rank
1st place, gold medalist(s)	Paola Espinosa	Mexico	347.25	2	383.20	1
2nd place, silver medalist(s)	Roseline Filion	Canada	353.80	1	377.60	2
3rd place, bronze medalist(s)	Meaghan Benfeito	Canada	315.10	4	357.45	3
4	Alejandra Orozco	Mexico	312.60	5	345.05	4
5	Samantha Bromberg	United States	326.35	3	337.95	5
6	Ingrid De Oliveira	Brazil	266.70	7	329.00	6
7	Giovanna Pedroso	Brazil	295.10	6	299.50	7
8	Delaney Schnell	United States	265.20	8	263.40	8
