= Diving at the 2019 Pan American Games – Women's 10 metre platform =

Women's 10 metre platform at the 2019 Pan American Games
- Venue: Aquatics Centre
- Dates: August 3
- Competitors: 14 from 7 nations
- Winning score: 375.05

Medalists
Gold medal	Meaghan Benfeito	Canada
Silver medal	Caeli McKay	Canada
Bronze medal	Alejandra Orozco	Mexico

The women's 10 metre platform competition of the diving events at the 2019 Pan American Games was held on 3 August at the Aquatics Centre in Lima, Peru.

== Schedule ==
Date	Time	Round
August 3, 2019	10:00	Preliminary
August 3, 2019	19:00	Final

== Results ==
Green denotes finalists

Rank	Diver	Nationality	Preliminary		Final	
Rank	Diver	Nationality	Points	Rank	Points	Rank
1st place, gold medalist(s)	Meaghan Benfeito	Canada	321.05	5	375.05	1
2nd place, silver medalist(s)	Caeli McKay	Canada	340.70	2	365.70	2
3rd place, bronze medalist(s)	Alejandra Orozco	Mexico	351.20	1	356.10	3
4	Delaney Schnell	United States	329.25	4	354.85	4
5	Amy Cozad	United States	319.00	6	349.55	5
6	Gabriela Agúndez	Mexico	330.45	3	327.00	6
7	Anisley García	Cuba	299.90	8	318.30	7
8	Ingrid Oliveira	Brazil	302.55	7	257.90	8
9	Andressa Bonfim	Brazil	263.70	9	233.20	9
10	Viviana Uribe	Colombia	254.20	10	224.20	10
11	Lisset Ramirez	Venezuela	215.45	12	216.85	11
12	Arlenys Garcia	Cuba	215.80	11	210.75	12
13	María Betancourt	Venezuela	214.70	13		
14	Valentina Quintero	Colombia	175.15	14		
