= Diving at the 2015 Pan American Games =

- Diving pictogram for the games
- Venue: CIBC Pan Am/Parapan Am Aquatics Centre and Field House
- Dates: July 10–13
- No. of events: 8 (4 men, 4 women)
- Competitors: 58 from 13 nations

Diving competitions at the 2015 Pan American Games in Toronto were held from July 10 to 13 at the Toronto Pan Am Sports Centre (CIBC Pan Am/Parapan Am Aquatics Centre and Field House). Due to naming rights the arena were known as the latter for the duration of the games. Due to Pan American Games being scheduled to be held roughly around the same time as the 2015 World Aquatics Championships scheduled for Kazan, Russia, the diving begin on the day of the opening ceremony (when events are traditionally not held on the day of the ceremony). A total of eight diving events were held: four each for men and women.

The winners of the four individual competitions, will qualify their country a quota place for the 2016 Summer Olympics in Rio de Janeiro, Brazil. If the host nation of the Olympics (Brazil) wins the event, the runner up will qualify instead.

== Competition schedule ==
The following is the competition schedule for the diving competitions:

P	Preliminaries	F	Final

Event↓/Date →	Fri 10	Sat 11	Sun 12		Mon 13
Men's 3 metre springboard	P	F			
Men's 10 metre platform			P	F	
Men's synchronized 3 metre springboard					F
Men's synchronized 10 metre platform					F
Women's 3 metre springboard			P	F	
Women's 10 metre platform	P	F			
Women's synchronized 3 metre springboard					F
Women's synchronized 10 metre platform					F

== Medal table ==
* Host nation (Canada)

Rank	Nation	Gold	Silver	Bronze	Total
1	Mexico	5	1	3	9
2	Canada*	2	5	2	9
3	Cuba	1	0	0	1
4	Colombia	0	1	1	2
5	Brazil	0	1	0	1
6	United States	0	0	2	2
Totals (6 entries)		8	8	8	24

== Medalists ==
=== Men's events ===
Event	Gold	Silver	Bronze
3 metre springboard	Rommel Pacheco; Mexico	Jahir Ocampo; Mexico	Philippe Gagné; Canada
10 metre platform	Iván García; Mexico	Víctor Ortega; Colombia	Jonathan Ruvalcaba; Mexico
Synchronized 3 metre springboard	Mexico; Jahir Ocampo; Rommel Pacheco	Canada; Philippe Gagné; François Imbeau-Dulac	United States; Cory Bowersox; Zachary Nees
Synchronized 10 metre platform	Cuba; Jeinkler Aguirre; José Guerra	Canada; Philippe Gagné; Vincent Riendeau	Colombia; Víctor Ortega; Juan Guillermo Rios

=== Women's events ===
Event	Gold	Silver	Bronze
3 metre springboard	Jennifer Abel; Canada	Pamela Ware; Canada	Dolores Hernández; Mexico
10 metre platform	Paola Espinosa; Mexico	Roseline Filion; Canada	Meaghan Benfeito; Canada
Synchronized 3 metre springboard	Mexico; Paola Espinosa; Dolores Hernández	Canada; Jennifer Abel; Pamela Ware	United States; Deidre Freeman; Maren Taylor
Synchronized 10 metre platform	Canada; Meaghan Benfeito; Roseline Filion	Brazil; Ingrid de Oliveira; Giovanna Pedroso	Mexico; Paola Espinosa; Alejandra Orozco

== Qualification ==
A total of 60 divers qualified to compete at the games. Each nation might enter a team of up to eight divers (six if not competing in synchronized events). A maximum of two divers per country could be entered in the individual events, and one team in the synchronized events. Nations must submit the names of the divers they want entered by April 15, 2015. If the total number of divers exceeds 60, then Swimming Union of the Americas (UANA) will use the world rankings, and finishes in tournaments to determine the competing athletes.

=== Qualification summary/Participating countries ===
Nation	Synchronized Diving				Individual Diving				Total
Nation	Men's 3m	Men's 10m	Women's 3m	Women's 10m	Men's 3m	Men's 10m	Women's 3m	Women's 10m	Athletes
Brazil	X	X	X	X	2	2	2	2	8
Canada	X	X	X	X	2	2	2	2	8
Chile	X		X		2		2		4
Colombia	X	X	X		2	2	1	1	6
Cuba		X		X	2	2		2	6
Dominican Republic						1			1
Ecuador						1			1
Jamaica					1				1
Mexico	X	X	X	X	2	2	2	2	8
Peru	X				2				2
Puerto Rico			X			1	2		3
United States	X	X	X	X	2	2	2	2	8
Venezuela	X				2	1		1	4
Total: 13 NOCs	8	6	7	5	18	16	14	12	60

== See also ==
- Diving at the 2016 Summer Olympics
