= Diving at the 2015 Pan American Games – Women's 3 metre springboard =

Women's 3 metre springboard at the 2015 Pan American Games
- Venue: CIBC Pan Am/Parapan Am Aquatics Centre and Field House
- Dates: July 12
- Competitors: 15 from 8 nations
- Winning score: 384.70

Medalists
Gold medal	Jennifer Abel	Canada
Silver medal	Pamela Ware	Canada
Bronze medal	Dolores Hernandez	Mexico

The women's 3 metre springboard competition of the diving events at the 2015 Pan American Games will be held on July 12 at the CIBC Pan Am/Parapan Am Aquatics Centre and Field House in Toronto, Canada. The winner of the competition will qualify his country a quota place for the 2016 Summer Olympics in Rio de Janeiro, Brazil. If the host nation of the Olympics wins the event, the runner up will qualify instead.

The individual diving competitions all consist of two rounds. In the first, the divers each perform five dives. The best 12 divers in the preliminaries advance to the final. In the final round, the divers perform a final set of five dives, with the scores from those dives (and only those dives) used to determine final ranking.

Seven judges evaluate each dive, giving the diver a score between 0 and 10 with increments of 0.5; scores below 7.0 or above 9.5 are rare. The two highest and two lowest scores from each judge are dropped. The remaining three scores are summed, and multiplied by the degree of difficulty of the dive to give the total score for the dive. Scores from each dive in the round are summed to give the round score.

== Schedule ==
Date	Time	Round
July 12, 2015	10:00	Preliminary
July 12, 2015	18:00	Final

== Results ==
Green denotes finalists

Rank	Diver	Nationality	Preliminary		Final	
Rank	Diver	Nationality	Points	Rank	Points	Rank
1st place, gold medalist(s)	Jennifer Abel	Canada	353.45	1	384.70	1
2nd place, silver medalist(s)	Pamela Ware	Canada	309.00	3	326.00	2
3rd place, bronze medalist(s)	Dolores Hernandez	Mexico	307.90	4	323.10	3
4	Arantxa Chávez	Mexico	281.20	7	321.80	4
5	Maren Taylor	United States	316.40	2	297.60	5
6	Juliana Veloso	Brazil	292.80	5	294.30	6
7	Luisa Jimenez Aragunde	Puerto Rico	262.05	8	288.80	7
8	Diana Pineda	Colombia	255.25	10	288.15	8
9	Deidre Freeman	United States	285.30	6	259.35	9
10	Jeniffer Fernandez	Puerto Rico	256.80	9	256.35	10
11	Tammy Galera	Brazil	232.80	11	247.50	11
12	Wendy Esquivel	Chile	212.15	12	185.35	12
13	Manuela Rios	Colombia	195.45	13	—	—
14	María Betancourt	Venezuela	190.35	14	—	—
15	Paula Sotomayor	Chile	179.45	15	—	—

== Detailed Results ==
=== Preliminary ===
Rank	Diver	Nationality	Preliminary									
Rank	Diver	Nationality	Dive 1	Rank	Dive 2	Rank	Dive 3	Rank	Dive 4	Rank	Dive 5	Grand Total
1	Jennifer Abel	Canada	66.00	1	141.95 (75.95)	1	218.45 (76.50)	1	276.95 (58.50)	1	76.50	353.45
2	Maren Taylor	United States	63.00	3	127.40 (64.40)	3	191.90 (64.50)	2	248.90 (57.00)	2	67.50	316.40
3	Pamela Ware	Canada	61.50	4	132.80 (71.30)	2	174.80 (42.00)	3	239.30 (64.50)	4	69.70	309.00
4	Dolores Hernandez	Mexico	61.50	4	120.40 (58.90)	4	174.40 (54.00)	4	241.90 (67.50)	3	66.00	307.90
5	Juliana Veloso	Brazil	64.50	2	120.00 (55.50)	5	174.00 (54.00)	5	237.00 (63.00)	5	55.80	292.80
6	Deidre Freeman	United States	60.00	6	115.50 (55.50)	6	171.00 (55.50)	6	226.80 (55.80)	6	58.50	285.30
7	Arantxa Chávez	Mexico	54.00	7	94.50 (40.50)	9	145.50 (51.00)	9	213.70 (68.20)	8	67.50	281.20
8	Luisa Jimenez Aragunde	Puerto Rico	49.95	11	104.55 (54.60)	7	167.55 (63.00)	7	217.05 (49.50)	7	45.00	262.05
9	Jeniffer Fernandez	Puerto Rico	51.60	8	92.20 (40.60)	10	146.20 (54.00)	8	209.20 (63.00)	9	47.60	256.80
10	Diana Pineda	Colombia	50.40	9	90.90 (40.50)	11	138.90 (48.00)	10	201.25 (62.35)	10	54.00	255.25
11	Tammy Galera	Brazil	35.00	15	86.80 (51.80)	12	128.80 (42.00)	11	181.50 (52.70)	11	51.30	232.80
12	Wendy Esquivel	Chile	39.15	14	75.15 (36.00)	15	117.15 (42.00)	14	168.95 (51.80)	12	43.20	212.15
13	Manuela Rios	Colombia	43.20	12	83.70 (40.50)	13	124.20 (40.50)	13	161.70 (37.50)	13	33.75	195.45
14	María Betancourt	Venezuela	50.40	9	100.35 (49.95)	8	127.35 (27.00)	12	148.35 (21.00)	15	42.00	190.35
15	Paula Sotomayor	Chile	41.85	13	79.65 (37.80)	14	109.05 (29.40)	15	152.45 (43.40)	14	27.00	179.45

=== Final ===
Rank	Diver	Nationality	Final									
Rank	Diver	Nationality	Dive 1	Rank	Dive 2	Rank	Dive 3	Rank	Dive 4	Rank	Dive 5	Grand Total
1st place, gold medalist(s)	Jennifer Abel	Canada	67.50	2	145.00 (77.50)	1	231.70 (86.70)	1	308.20 (76.50)	1	76.50	384.70
2nd place, silver medalist(s)	Pamela Ware	Canada	72.00	1	137.10 (65.10)	2	194.10 (57.00)	2	263.10 (69.00)	2	62.90	326.00
3rd place, bronze medalist(s)	Dolores Hernandez	Mexico	61.50	4	126.60 (65.10)	4	192.60 (66.00)	3	260.10 (67.50)	3	63.00	323.10
4	Arantxa Chávez	Mexico	49.50	10	108.00 (58.50)	8	175.50 (67.50)	6	246.80 (71.30)	4	75.00	321.80
5	Maren Taylor	United States	54.00	7	108.60 (54.60)	7	171.60 (63.00)	7	230.10 (58.50)	8	67.50	297.60
6	Juliana Veloso	Brazil	63.00	3	117.00 (54.00)	5	180.00 (63.00)	5	238.50 (58.50)	5	55.80	294.30
7	Luisa Jimenez Aragunde	Puerto Rico	56.70	6	104.30 (47.60)	9	170.30 (66.00)	8	230.30 (60.00)	7	58.50	288.80
8	Diana Pineda	Colombia	50.40	9	110.40 (60.00)	6	167.40 (57.00)	9	232.65 (65.25)	6	55.50	288.15
9	Deidre Freeman	United States	58.50	5	127.50 (69.00)	3	181.50 (54.00)	4	223.35 (41.85)	9	36.00	259.35
10	Jeniffer Fernandez	Puerto Rico	54.00	7	103.00 (49.00)	11	155.65 (52.65)	11	217.15 (61.50)	10	39.20	256.35
11	Tammy Galera	Brazil	46.20	11	103.60 (57.40)	10	162.10 (58.50)	10	196.20 (34.10)	11	51.30	247.50
12	Wendy Esquivel	Chile	39.15	12	85.95 (46.80)	12	115.35 (29.40)	12	143.35 (28.00)	12	42.00	185.35
