= Diving at the 2019 Pan American Games =

- Diving pictogram
- Venue: Aquatics Centre
- Dates: August 1–5, 2019
- No. of events: 10 (5 men, 5 women)
- Competitors: 70 from 12 nations

The diving competitions at the 2019 Pan American Games in Lima took place from August 1 to 5, 2019 at the Aquatics Centre. It was one of four aquatic sports at the Games, along with swimming, water polo, and artistic swimming.

The games featured competitions in ten events (men and women events each of): 1m springboard, 3m springboard, synchronised 3m springboard, 10m platform, and synchronised 10m platform. The 1m springboard events returned to the program.

The winner of each individual 3m and 10m event (if not already qualified) qualified for the 2020 Summer Olympics in Tokyo, Japan.

== Medal summary ==
=== Medal table ===
Rank	Nation	Gold	Silver	Bronze	Total
1	Mexico	4	4	3	11
2	Canada	4	3	2	9
3	United States	1	2	4	7
4	Colombia	1	0	0	1
5	Jamaica	0	1	0	1
6	Brazil	0	0	1	1
Totals (6 entries)		10	10	10	30

=== Medalists ===
==== Men's Events ====
Games	Gold	Silver	Bronze
1 m springboard	Juan Celaya; Mexico	Yona Knight-Wisdom; Jamaica	Andrew Capobianco; United States
3 m springboard	Daniel Restrepo; Colombia	Juan Celaya; Mexico	Philippe Gagné; Canada
10 m platform	Kevin Berlín; Mexico	Iván García; Mexico	Vincent Riendeau; Canada
Synchronized 3 m springboard	Mexico; Yahel Castillo; Juan Celaya	Canada; Philippe Gagné; François Imbeau-Dulac	United States; Michael Hixon; Andrew Capobianco
Synchronized 10 m platform	Mexico; Iván García; Kevin Berlín	Canada; Vincent Riendeau; Nathan Zsombor-Murray	Brazil; Isaac Souza; Kawan Pereira

==== Women's Events ====
Games	Gold	Silver	Bronze
1 m springboard	Sarah Bacon; United States	Brooke Schultz; United States	Paola Espinosa; Mexico
3 m springboard	Jennifer Abel; Canada	Dolores Hernández; Mexico	Brooke Schultz; United States
10 m platform	Meaghan Benfeito; Canada	Caeli McKay; Canada	Alejandra Orozco; Mexico
Synchronized 3 m springboard	Canada; Jennifer Abel; Pamela Ware	United States; Brooke Schultz; Sarah Bacon	Mexico; Paola Espinosa; Dolores Hernández
Synchronized 10 m platform	Canada; Meaghan Benfeito; Caeli McKay	Mexico; Alejandra Orozco; Gabriela Agúndez	United States; Amy Cozad; Delaney Schnell

== See also ==
- Diving at the 2018 Asian Games
- Diving at the 2020 Summer Olympics
