= Diving at the 2015 Pan American Games – Women's synchronized 10 metre platform =

Women's synchronized 10 metre platform at the 2015 Pan American Games
- Venue: CIBC Pan Am/Parapan Am Aquatics Centre and Field House
- Dates: July 13
- Competitors: 10 from 5 nations
- Winning score: 316.89

Medalists
Gold medal	Meaghan Benfeito; Roseline Filion	Canada
Silver medal	Ingrid De Oliveira; Giovanna Pedroso	Brazil
Bronze medal	Paola Espinosa; Alejandra Orozco	Mexico

The women's synchronized 10 metre platform competition of the diving events at the 2015 Pan American Games will be held on July 13 at the CIBC Pan Am/Parapan Am Aquatics Centre and Field House in Toronto, Canada. The winner of the competition will qualify her country a quota place for the 2016 Summer Olympics in Rio de Janeiro, Brazil. If the host nation of the Olympics wins the event, the runner up will qualify instead.

The synchronized diving competitions all consist of one round. All teams compete in a single round of six dives.

Seven judges evaluate each dive, giving the diver a score between 0 and 10 with increments of 0.5; scores below 7.0 or above 9.5 are rare. The two highest and two lowest scores from each judge are dropped. The remaining three scores are summed, and multiplied by the degree of difficulty of the dive to give the total score for the dive. Scores from each dive in the round are summed to give the round score.

== Schedule ==
Date	Time	Round
July 13, 2015	13:00	Finals

== Results ==
Rank	Divers	Nationality	Points
1st place, gold medalist(s)	Meaghan Benfeito; Roseline Filion	Canada	316.89
2nd place, silver medalist(s)	Ingrid De Oliveira; Giovanna Pedroso	Brazil	291.36
3rd place, bronze medalist(s)	Paola Espinosa; Alejandra Orozco	Mexico	287.91
4	Samantha Bromberg; Delaney Schnell	United States	287.82
5	Yaima Mena; Annia Rivera	Cuba	229.56

=== Detailed Results ===
Rank	Divers	Nationality	Dive 1	Rank	Dive 2	Rank	Dive 3	Rank	Dive 4	Rank	Dive 5	Grand Total
1st place, gold medalist(s)	Meaghan Benfeito; Roseline Filion	Canada	53.40	1	106.80 (53.40)	1	168.90 (62.10)	2	237.21 (68.31)	2	79.68	316.89
2nd place, silver medalist(s)	Ingrid De Oliveira; Giovanna Pedroso	Brazil	49.80	3	94.20 (44.40)	3	168.12 (73.92)	3	239.16 (71.04)	1	52.20	291.36
3rd place, bronze medalist(s)	Paola Espinosa; Alejandra Orozco	Mexico	50.40	2	100.80 (50.40)	2	171.84 (71.04)	1	232.23 (60.39)	3	55.68	287.91
4	Samantha Bromberg; Delaney Schnell	United States	48.60	4	92.40 (43.80)	4	156.30 (63.90)	4	221.58 (65.28)	4	66.24	287.82
5	Yaima Mena; Annia Rivera	Cuba	32.40	5	72.00 (39.60)	5	126.60 (54.60)	5	180.60 (54.00)	5	48.96	229.56
