= Diving at the 2019 Pan American Games – Women's 3 metre springboard =

Women's 3 metre springboard at the 2019 Pan American Games
- Venue: Aquatics Centre
- Dates: August 4–5
- Competitors: 16 from 9 nations
- Winning score: 374.25

Medalists
Gold medal	Jennifer Abel	Canada
Silver medal	Dolores Hernández	Mexico
Bronze medal	Brooke Schultz	United States

The women's 3 metre springboard competition of the diving events at the 2019 Pan American Games was held on 4–5 August at the Aquatics Centre in Lima, Peru.

== Schedule ==
Date	Time	Round
August 4, 2019	10:00	Preliminary
August 5, 2019	19:00	Final

== Results ==
Green denotes finalists

Rank	Diver	Nationality	Preliminary		Final	
Rank	Diver	Nationality	Points	Rank	Points	Rank
1st place, gold medalist(s)	Jennifer Abel	Canada	352.35	1	374.25	1
2nd place, silver medalist(s)	Dolores Hernández	Mexico	280.35	7	339.60	2
3rd place, bronze medalist(s)	Brooke Schultz	United States	313.75	3	334.85	3
4	Pamela Ware	Canada	318.60	2	330.60	4
5	Sarah Bacon	United States	305.10	4	317.30	5
6	Luana Wanderley	Brazil	289.65	5	296.45	6
7	Diana Pineda	Colombia	279.40	8	274.35	7
8	Viviana Uribe	Colombia	251.35	9	269.55	8
9	Paola Espinosa	Mexico	286.20	6	264.30	9
10	Alison Maillard	Chile	244.70	11	253.45	10
11	Juliana Veloso	Brazil	234.80	12	246.85	11
12	Anisley García	Cuba	244.90	10	192.90	12
13	Prisis Ruiz	Cuba	209.15	13		
14	Wendy Espina	Chile	203.40	14		
15	Mayte Salinas	Peru	196.20	15		
16	Elizabeth Pérez Noguera	Venezuela	169.05	16		
