= Diving at the 2015 Pan American Games – Women's synchronized 3 metre springboard =

Women's synchronized 3 metre springboard at the 2015 Pan American Games
- Venue: CIBC Pan Am/Parapan Am Aquatics Centre and Field House
- Dates: July 13
- Competitors: 14 from 7 nations
- Winning score: 301.20

Medalists
Gold medal	Paola Espinosa; Dolores Hernandez	Mexico
Silver medal	Jennifer Abel; Pamela Ware	Canada
Bronze medal	Deidre Freeman; Maren Taylor	United States

The women's synchronized 3 metre springboard competition of the diving events at the 2015 Pan American Games will be held on July 13 at the CIBC Pan Am/Parapan Am Aquatics Centre and Field House in Toronto, Canada. The winner of the competition will qualify his country a quota place for the 2016 Summer Olympics in Rio de Janeiro, Brazil. If the host nation of the Olympics wins the event, the runner up will qualify instead.

The synchronized diving competitions all consist of one round. All teams compete in a single round of six dives.

Seven judges evaluate each dive, giving the diver a score between 0 and 10 with increments of 0.5; scores below 7.0 or above 9.5 are rare. The two highest and two lowest scores from each judge are dropped. The remaining three scores are summed, and multiplied by the degree of difficulty of the dive to give the total score for the dive. Scores from each dive in the round are summed to give the round score.

== Schedule ==
Date	Time	Round
July 13, 2015	18:30	Finals

== Results ==
Rank	Divers	Nationality	Points
1st place, gold medalist(s)	Paola Espinosa; Dolores Hernandez	Mexico	301.20
2nd place, silver medalist(s)	Jennifer Abel; Pamela Ware	Canada	298.23
3rd place, bronze medalist(s)	Deidre Freeman; Maren Taylor	United States	293.10
4	Tammy Galera; Juliana Veloso	Brazil	255.45
5	Diana Pineda; Manuela Rios	Colombia	246.87
6	Jeniffer Fernandez; Luisa Jimenez Aragunde	Puerto Rico	241.59
7	Wendy Esquivel; Paula Sotomayor	Chile	205.92
