= Diving at the 2023 Pan American Games – Women's 10 metre platform =

Women's 10 metre platform at the 2023 Pan American Games
- Venue: Aquatics Centre
- Dates: October 20–21
- Competitors: 17 from 9 nations
- Winning score: 361.55

Medalists
Gold medal	Gabriela Agundez	Mexico
Silver medal	Alejandra Orozco	Mexico
Bronze medal	Caeli McKay	Canada

The women's 10 metre platform competition of the diving events at the 2023 Pan American Games was held between October 20 and 21 at the Aquatics Centre in Santiago, Chile. A total of 15 divers from nine countries took part.

== Qualification ==
A total of up to 80 divers (40 per gender) across all events qualified to compete. A nation may enter a maximum of 10 divers (if entering teams in synchronized diving) or 6 athletes (if not entering teams in synchronized diving), with the exception of the winners of the 2021 Junior Pan American Games, provided that these athletes participate only in the event in which they qualified in Cali. The host nation (Chile) automatically qualified a full team of 10 athletes (five per gender). The top 18 men and women in individual events in the 2022 and 2023 FINA World Championships will secure spots for their NOCs. In addition, at each of the CONSANAT Championships (Zone 1) and the PAQ Qualifying Diving Championships (Zone 2), divers from federations competing in such events may earn a quota position for their NOCs provided that the total number of divers from such Zones do not exceed 24 divers on all boards (including those who are ranked in FINA from such competing federations but excluding any divers from CHI). Zone 3 and 4 divers do not have separate qualifiers within their zones. National championships or trials events in Zones 3 and 4 may be used to name divers to already qualified positions.

== Schedule ==
Date	Time	Round
October 20, 2023	10:00	Preliminary
October 21, 2023	18:00	Final

== Results ==
Green denotes finalists

- Only 2 per NOC could qualify for the final.

Rank	Diver	Nationality	Preliminary		Final	
Rank	Diver	Nationality	Points	Rank	Points	Rank
1st place, gold medalist(s)	Gabriela Agúndez	Mexico	333.75	2	361.55	1
2nd place, silver medalist(s)	Alejandra Orozco	Mexico	320.10	3	340.80	2
3rd place, bronze medalist(s)	Caeli McKay	Canada	343.95	1	335.65	3
4	Ingrid Oliveira	Brazil	318.30	4	326.40	4
5	Maycey Vieta	Puerto Rico	275.50	8	309.70	5
6	Jordan Skilken	United States	264.45	9	277.80	6
7	Mariana Osorio	Colombia	233.25	13	272.80	7
8	Anisley García	Cuba	315.45	5	270.25	8
9	Victoria Garza	Dominican Republic	246.95	12	261.85	9
10	Nike Agunbiade	United States	298.50	7	260.10	10
11	Celina Toth	Canada	251.80	11	247.75	11
12	María Gómez	Colombia	260.90	10	215.25	12
13	Alejandra Estudillo	Mexico	311.60	6	Over 2 per country limit	
14	Elizabeth Miclau	Puerto Rico	233.15	14	Did not advance	
15	Arlenys García	Cuba	224.65	15	Did not advance	
16	Pamela Reyes	Peru	183.45	16	Did not advance	
—N/a	Giovanna Pedroso	Brazil	Did not start			
