= Diving at the 2019 Pan American Games – Women's synchronized 10 metre platform =

Women's synchronized 10 metre platform at the 2019 Pan American Games
- Venue: Aquatics Centre
- Dates: August 4
- Competitors: 8 from 4 nations
- Winning score: 320.64

Medalists
Gold medal	Meaghan Benfeito; Caeli McKay	Canada
Silver medal	Alejandra Orozco; Gabriela Agúndez	Mexico
Bronze medal	Amy Cozad; Delaney Schnell	United States

The women's synchronized 10 metre platform competition of the diving events at the 2019 Pan American Games was held on 4 August at the Aquatics Centre in Lima, Peru.

== Schedule ==
Date	Time	Round
August 4, 2019	20:52	Final

== Results ==
Rank	Diver	Nationality	Points
1st place, gold medalist(s)	Meaghan Benfeito; Caeli McKay	Canada	320.64
2nd place, silver medalist(s)	Alejandra Orozco; Gabriela Agúndez	Mexico	307.38
3rd place, bronze medalist(s)	Amy Cozad; Delaney Schnell	United States	281.10
4	Anisley García; Arlenys Garcia	Cuba	260.70
