= Diving at the 2019 Pan American Games – Women's 1 metre springboard =

Women's 1 metre springboard at the 2019 Pan American Games
- Venue: Aquatics Centre
- Dates: August 2
- Competitors: 14 from 8 nations
- Winning score: 284.10

Medalists
Gold medal	Sarah Bacon	United States
Silver medal	Brooke Schultz	United States
Bronze medal	Paola Espinosa	Mexico

The women's 1 metre springboard competition of the diving events at the 2019 Pan American Games was held on 2 August at the Aquatics Centre in Lima, Peru.

== Schedule ==
Date	Time	Round
August 2, 2019	10:00	Preliminary
August 2, 2019	20:45	Final

== Results ==
Green denotes finalists

Rank	Diver	Nationality	Preliminary		Final	
Rank	Diver	Nationality	Points	Rank	Points	Rank
1st place, gold medalist(s)	Sarah Bacon	United States	247.25	4	284.10	1
2nd place, silver medalist(s)	Brooke Schultz	United States	224.25	9	279.45	2
3rd place, bronze medalist(s)	Paola Espinosa	Mexico	254.65	2	278.35	3
4	Dolores Hernández	Mexico	255.10	1	273.15	4
5	Diana Pineda	Colombia	240.70	5	259.00	5
6	Alison Maillard	Chile	227.30	8	254.70	6
7	Luana Wanderley	Brazil	249.70	3	253.55	7
8	Anisley García	Cuba	234.45	6	251.65	8
9	Juliana Veloso	Brazil	232.30	7	241.30	9
10	Elizabeth Pérez Noguera	Venezuela	202.90	12	230.60	10
11	Steffanie Madrigal	Colombia	221.85	10	230.45	11
12	Prisis Ruiz	Cuba	217.40	11	226.35	12
13	Wendy Espina	Chile	202.15	13		
14	Mayte Salinas	Peru	196.60	14		
