= Diving at the 2014 Central American and Caribbean Games =

- Venue: Leyes de Reforma Aquatic Center
- Location: Veracruz, Mexico
- Dates: 25-30 November

The Diving competition at the 2014 Central American and Caribbean Games was held in Veracruz, Mexico.

The tournament was scheduled to be held from 25 to 30 November at the Leyes de Reforma Aquatic Center.

== Medal summary ==
=== Men's events ===
Event	Gold		Silver		Bronze	
1m Springboard	Sebastián Morales (COL)	411.35	Julián Sánchez (MEX)	392.80	Rafael Quintero (PUR)	390.35
3m Springboard	Sebastián Morales (COL)	422.20	Julián Sánchez (MEX)	421.90	Yahel Castillo (MEX)	400.05
10m Platform	Iván García (MEX)	502.70	José Ruvalcaba (MEX)	483.35	Rafael Quintero (PUR)	468.65
3m Synchronised Springboard	Mexico (MEX); Julián Sánchez; Yahel Castillo	411.57	Colombia (COL); Sebastián Villa; Sebastián Morales	388.38	Cuba (CUB); Rene Hernandez; Jorge Pupo	377.34

=== Women's events ===
Event	Gold		Silver		Bronze	
1m Springboard	Dolores Hernandez (MEX)	279.30	Diana Pineda (COL)	260.35	Lidia Vargas (CUB)	246.30
3m Springboard	Dolores Hernandez (MEX)	332.25	Diana Pineda (COL)	302.90	María Betancourt (VEN)	268.80
10m Platform	Alejandra Estrella (MEX)	337.10	María Betancourt (VEN)	287.20	Gabriela Agundez (MEX)	271.60
3m Synchronised Springboard	Mexico (MEX); Arantxa Chavez; Dolores Hernandez	304.20	Colombia (COL); Diana Pineda; Sara Bedoya	266.16	Puerto Rico (PUR); Luisa Maria Jimenez; Jeniffer Fernandez	250.02
10m Synchronised Platform	Mexico (MEX); Gabriela Agundez; Alejandra Estrella	291.18	Cuba (CUB); Yaima Mena; Annia Rivera	270.48	Colombia (COL); Sara Carolina Perez; Viviana Uribe	241.74

== Medal table ==
* Host nation (Mexico)

Rank	Nation	Gold	Silver	Bronze	Total
1	Mexico (MEX)*	7	3	2	12
2	Colombia (COL)	2	4	1	7
3	Cuba (CUB)	0	1	2	3
4	Venezuela (VEN)	0	1	1	2
5	Puerto Rico (PUR)	0	0	3	3
Totals (5 entries)		9	9	9	27
