= Diving at the 2018 South American Games =

Diving competitions at the 2018 South American Games

- Venue: Parque Aquático Mariscal Santa Cruz
- Dates: June 5−8

Diving competitions at the 2018 South American Games in Cochabamba, Bolivia were held between June 5 and 8, 2018 at the Parque Aquático Mariscal Santa Cruz

== Medal summary ==
=== Medal table ===
* Host nation (Paraguay)

| Rank | Nation | Gold | Silver | Bronze | Total |
|---|---|---|---|---|---|
| 1 | Colombia | 6 | 1 | 3 | 10 |
| 2 | Brazil | 1 | 1 | 1 | 3 |
| 3 | Venezuela | 0 | 4 | 1 | 5 |
| 4 | Chile | 0 | 1 | 0 | 1 |
| 5 | Ecuador | 0 | 0 | 1 | 1 |
| 5 | Peru | 0 | 0 | 1 | 1 |
| Totals (6 entries) | | 7 | 7 | 7 | 21 |

=== Medalists ===
==== Men ====
| Event | Gold | Silver | Bronze |
|---|---|---|---|
| 3 m springboard | Alejandro Arias; Colombia | Luis Uribe; Colombia | Óscar Ariza; Venezuela |
| 10 m platform | Sebastián Villa; Colombia | Isaac Souza; Brazil | Víctor Ortega; Colombia |
| Synchronised 3 m springboard | Alejandro Arias; Sebastián Villa; Colombia | Diego Carquin; Donato Neglia; Chile | Adrian Infante; Daniel Pinto; Peru |

==== Women ====
| Event | Gold | Silver | Bronze |
|---|---|---|---|
| 3 m springboard | Diana Pineda; Colombia | María Betancourt; Venezuela | Viviana Uribe; Colombia |
| 10 m platform | Ingrid Oliveira; Brazil | María Betancourt; Venezuela | Carolina Murillo; Colombia |
| Synchronised 3 m springboard | Diana Pineda; Viviana Uribe; Colombia | Lisette Ramírez; María Betancourt; Venezuela | Madeleine Rivadeneira; Rommy Santillan; Ecuador |
| Synchronised 10 m platform | Carolina Murillo; Viviana Uribe; Colombia | Lisette Ramírez; María Betancourt; Venezuela | Giovanna Pedroso; Ingrid Oliveira; Brazil |
