= Diving at the 2019 Pan American Games – Men's synchronized 10 metre platform =

Men's synchronized 10 metre platform at the 2019 Pan American Games
- Venue: Aquatics Centre
- Dates: August 2
- Competitors: 16 from 8 nations
- Winning score: 431.10

Medalists
Gold medal	Iván García; Kevin Berlin	Mexico
Silver medal	Vincent Riendeau; Nathan Zsombor-Murray	Canada
Bronze medal	Isaac Filho; Kawan Pereira	Brazil

The men's synchronized 10 metre platform competition of the diving events at the 2019 Pan American Games was held on 2 August at the Aquatics Centre in Lima, Peru.

== Schedule ==
Date	Time	Round
August 2, 2019	19:00	Final

== Results ==
Rank	Diver	Nationality	Points
1st place, gold medalist(s)	Iván García; Kevin Berlin	Mexico	431.10
2nd place, silver medalist(s)	Vincent Riendeau; Nathan Zsombor-Murray	Canada	396.12
3rd place, bronze medalist(s)	Isaac Filho; Kawan Pereira	Brazil	375.81
4	Steele Johnson; Benjamin Bramley	United States	368.61
5	Sebastián Villa; Víctor Ortega	Colombia	363.99
6	José Ruvalcaba; Frandiel Gómez	Dominican Republic	339.66
7	Jesus Gonzalez Reyes; Oscar Ariza	Venezuela	322.98
8	Yusmandy Paz; Jeinkler Aguirre	Cuba	315.90
