= Diving at the 2019 Pan American Games – Women's synchronized 3 metre springboard =

Women's synchronized 3 metre springboard at the 2019 Pan American Games
- Venue: Aquatics Centre
- Dates: August 1
- Competitors: 14 from 7 nations
- Winning score: 309.60

Medalists
Gold medal	Jennifer Abel; Pamela Ware	Canada
Silver medal	Brooke Schultz; Sarah Bacon	United States
Bronze medal	Paola Espinosa; Dolores Hernández	Mexico

The women's synchronized 3 metre springboard competition of the diving events at the 2019 Pan American Games was held on 1 August at the Aquatics Centre in Lima, Peru.

== Schedule ==
Date	Time	Round
August 1, 2019	19:00	Final

== Results ==
Rank	Diver	Nationality	Points
1st place, gold medalist(s)	Jennifer Abel; Pamela Ware	Canada	309.60
2nd place, silver medalist(s)	Brooke Schultz; Sarah Bacon	United States	290.10
3rd place, bronze medalist(s)	Paola Espinosa; Dolores Hernández	Mexico	285.00
4	Diana Pineda; Steffanie Madrigal	Colombia	249.78
5	Anisley García; Prisis Ruiz	Cuba	238.83
6	Luana Wanderley; Juliana Veloso	Brazil	232.29
7	Luciana Gil; Pamela Reyes	Peru	196.23
