= Diving at the 2010 South American Games – Women's 3 m synchro springboard =

The Women's 3m Synchronized Springboard event at the 2010 South American Games was held on March 22 at 15:00.

== Medalists ==
Gold	Silver	Bronze
Juliana Veloso; Tammy Takagi; Brazil	Diana Isabel Zuleta; Manuela Lemus; Colombia	Gabriela Gutierrez; Rafaela Ramos; Ecuador

== Results ==
Rank	Athlete	Dives					Result
Rank	Athlete	1	2	3	4	5	Result
1st place, gold medalist(s)	Brazil; Juliana Veloso; Tammy Takagi	45.00	48.00	68.04	56.28	59.13	276.45
2nd place, silver medalist(s)	Colombia; Diana Isabel Zuleta; Manuela Lemus	50.40	45.60	58.32	59.13	50.40	263.85
3rd place, bronze medalist(s)	Ecuador; Gabriela Gutierrez; Rafaela Ramos	45.60	47.40	48.24	55.08	51.24	247.56
4	Chile; Wendy Esquivel; Paula Godoy	37.80	33.60	44.73	43.56	44.64	204.33
