= Diving at the 2010 South American Games – Women's 3 m springboard =

The Women's 3m Springboard event at the 2010 South American Games was held on March 22 at 13:00.

== Medalists ==
Gold	Silver	Bronze
Juliana Veloso; Brazil	Diana Pineda; Colombia	Tammy Takagi; Brazil

== Results ==
Rank	Athlete	Dives					Result
Rank	Athlete	1	2	3	4	5	Result
1st place, gold medalist(s)	Juliana Veloso (BRA)	61.20	57.40	72.00	66.00	63.00	319.60
2nd place, silver medalist(s)	Diana Pineda (COL)	61.20	58.80	63.80	63.00	68.85	315.65
3rd place, bronze medalist(s)	Tammy Takagi (BRA)	49.20	56.70	42.00	46.20	51.60	245.70
4	Manuela Ríos (COL)	49.20	47.25	49.00	25.20	45.00	215.65
5	Norka Sabando (ECU)	49.20	32.20	46.20	32.40	46.80	206.80
6	Wendy Esquivel (CHI)	31.50	37.40	40.80	37.05	41.00	187.75
7	Rafaela Suárez (ECU)	50.40	29.70	18.20	37.05	39.00	174.35
8	Paula Sotomayor (CHI)	30.80	9.50	48.60	37.00	42.00	167.90
