= Diving at the 2013 World Aquatics Championships – Women's synchronized 10 metre platform =

Women's synchronized 10 metre platform at the 2013 World Aquatics Championships
- Dates: 22 July
- Competitors: 26 from 13 nations
- Winning points: 356.28

Medalists
gold medal	Liu Huixia; Chen Ruolin	China
silver medal	Meaghan Benfeito; Roseline Filion	Canada
bronze medal	Pandelela Rinong; Leong Mun Yee	Malaysia

The women's synchronized 10 metre platform competition at 2013 World Aquatics Championships was held on July 22 with the preliminary round in the morning and the final in the evening session.

== Results ==
The preliminary round was held at 10:00 and the final at 17:30.

Green denotes finalists

Rank	Diver	Nationality	Preliminary		Final	
Rank	Diver	Nationality	Points	Rank	Points	Rank
1st place, gold medalist(s)	Liu Huixia; Chen Ruolin	China	340.92	1	356.28	1
2nd place, silver medalist(s)	Meaghan Benfeito; Roseline Filion	Canada	308.40	4	331.41	2
3rd place, bronze medalist(s)	Pandelela Rinong; Leong Mun Yee	Malaysia	310.98	3	331.14	3
4	Lara Tarvit; Emily Boyd	Australia	295.92	7	309.78	4
5	Tonia Couch; Sarah Barrow	Great Britain	306.54	6	309.72	5
6	Paola Espinosa; Alejandra Orozco	Mexico	314.25	2	306.39	6
7	Cheyenne Cousineau; Samantha Bromberg	United States	285.15	9	301.74	7
8	Yulia Timoshinina; Ekaterina Petukhova	Russia	308.04	5	298.32	8
9	Kim Jin-Ok; Choe Un-Gyong	North Korea	285.30	8	276.54	9
10	Villő Kormos; Zsófia Reisinger	Hungary	256.26	12	261.24	10
11	Cho Eun-Bi; Kim Su-ji	South Korea	266.82	11	259.80	11
12	Maria Kurjo; Julia Stolle	Germany	270.72	10	253.08	12
13	Dew Setyaningsih; Linadini Yasmin	Indonesia	203.67	13		
