= María Betancourt =

María Betancourt is the name of:

- María Betancourt (diver) (born 1994), Venezuelan diver
- María Cristina Betancourt (born 1947), Cuban discus thrower
