= Diving at the 2016 Summer Olympics – Women's synchronized 10 metre platform =

Women's synchronized 10 metre platform at the Games of the XXXI Olympiad
- Venue: Maria Lenk Aquatic Center
- Date: 9 August 2016
- Competitors: 16 from 8 nations
- Teams: 8 pairs
- Winning total: 367.00 points

Medalists
1st place, gold medalist(s)		Chen Ruolin; Liu Huixia	China
2nd place, silver medalist(s)		Cheong Jun Hoong; Pandelela Rinong	Malaysia
3rd place, bronze medalist(s)		Meaghan Benfeito; Roseline Filion	Canada

The women's synchronized 10 metre platform diving competition at the 2016 Summer Olympics in Rio de Janeiro took place on 8 August at the Maria Lenk Aquatic Center in Barra da Tijuca.

== Competition format ==
The competition was held in a single stage with each two-person team making five rounds of dives. There were eleven judges scoring each dive made by each team - three judges for each diver; six in total, and five judges for synchronisation. Only the middle score counted for each diver, with the middle three counting for synchronisation. These five scores were averaged, multiplied by 3, and multiplied by the dive's degree of difficulty to give a total dive score. The scores for each of the five dives were summed to give a final score.

== Schedule ==
Times are Brasília time, BRT (UTC−03:00)

Date	Time	Round
Tuesday 9 Aug 2016	16:00	Final

== Results ==
Rank	Nation	Dives					Total
Rank	Nation	1	2	3	4	5	Total
1st place, gold medalist(s)	China; Chen Ruolin; Liu Huixia	55.80	55.80	79.20	75.84	87.36	354.00
2nd place, silver medalist(s)	Malaysia; Cheong Jun Hoong; Pandelela Rinong	52.80	52.80	76.50	79.68	82.56	344.34
3rd place, bronze medalist(s)	Canada; Meaghan Benfeito; Roseline Filion	52.80	52.80	74.70	75.24	80.64	336.18
4	North Korea; Kim Kuk-hyang; Kim Mi-rae	49.80	53.40	81.00	76.80	61.44	322.44
5	Great Britain; Tonia Couch; Lois Toulson	50.40	50.40	75.60	79.68	63.36	319.44
6	Mexico; Paola Espinosa; Alejandra Orozco	50.40	49.20	71.10	61.38	72.00	304.08
7	United States; Amy Cozad; Jessica Parratto	48.60	50.40	65.70	62.40	73.92	301.02
8	Brazil; Ingrid Oliveira; Giovanna Pedroso	44.40	45.00	74.88	52.80	63.90	280.98
