= Diving at the 2022 World Aquatics Championships – Women's synchronized 10 metre platform =

Women's synchronized 10 metre platform at the 2022 World Aquatics Championships
- Venue: Danube Arena
- Location: Budapest, Hungary
- Dates: 30 June (preliminary and final)
- Competitors: 18 from 9 nations
- Teams: 9
- Winning points: 368.40

Medalists
gold medal	Chen Yuxi; Quan Hongchan	China
silver medal	Delaney Schnell; Katrina Young	United States
bronze medal	Pandelela Rinong; Nur Dhabitah Sabri	Malaysia

The Women's synchronized 10 metre platform competition at the 2022 World Aquatics Championships was held on 30 June 2022.

== Results ==
The preliminary round was started on 30 June at 09:00. The final was started on 30 June at 17:00.

Rank	Nation	Divers	Preliminary		Final	
Rank	Nation	Divers	Points	Rank	Points	Rank
1st place, gold medalist(s)	China	Chen Yuxi; Quan Hongchan	352.08	1	368.40	1
2nd place, silver medalist(s)	United States	Delaney Schnell; Katrina Young	296.28	2	299.40	2
3rd place, bronze medalist(s)	Malaysia	Pandelela Rinong; Nur Dhabitah Sabri	270.90	6	298.68	3
4	Japan	Matsuri Arai; Minami Itahashi	275.46	4	297.84	4
5	Germany	Elena Wassen; Christina Wassen	281.88	3	284.16	5
6	Ukraine	Kseniya Baylo; Sofiya Lyskun	267.72	8	283.08	6
7	Australia	Charli Petrov; Melissa Wu	264.48	9	274.68	7
8	Mexico	Viviana Del Ángel; Samantha Jiménez	271.62	5	269.10	8
9	Great Britain	Robyn Birch; Emily Martin	269.58	7	259.20	9
