= Alison Maillard =

Chilean diver

Personal information
- Born: 5 August 1998 (age 26)

Sport
- Country: Chile
- Sport: Diving

Alison Maillard (born 5 August 1998) is a Chilean diver. In 2019, she finished in 27th place in the preliminary round in the women's 1 metre springboard event at the 2019 World Aquatics Championships held in Gwangju, South Korea. In the women's 3 metre springboard event she finished in 45th place in the preliminary round. Maillard and Donato Neglia finished in 17th place in the mixed synchronized 3 metre springboard event.

In 2019, she finished in 6th place in the women's 1 metre springboard at the 2019 Pan American Games held in Lima, Peru. In the women's 3 metre springboard event she finished in 10th place.
