= Diving at the 2014 South American Games – Women's 3 metre springboard =

Women's 3 metre springboard at the 2014 South American Games
- Venue: Aquatic Center National Stadium
- Dates: March 16 (final)
- Competitors: 10 from 5 nations
- Winning score: 313.20

Medalists
gold medal	María Florencia Betancourt (VEN)
silver medal	Diana Pineda (COL)
bronze medal	Carolina Murillo (COL)

The women's 3 metre springboard diving competition at the 2014 South American Games in Santiago was held on 16 March at the Aquatic Center National Stadium.

== Schedule ==
All times are Chile Summer Time (UTC−03:00)

Date	Time	Event
16 March	11:30	Final

== Results ==
Rank	Athlete	Dive					Total
Rank	Athlete	1	2	3	4	5	Total
1st place, gold medalist(s)	María Florencia Betancourt (VEN)	55.50	67.20	60.00	63.00	67.50	313.20
2nd place, silver medalist(s)	Diana Pineda (COL)	61.20	62.10	57.00	52.50	63.80	296.60
3rd place, bronze medalist(s)	Carolina Murillo (COL)	57.60	64.80	56.00	58.80	57.50	294.70
4	Juliana Veloso (BRA)	52.80	56.00	60.20	56.70	66.00	291.70
5	Milena Sae (BRA)	57.40	56.00	49.50	45.60	48.60	257.10
6	Wendy Espina (CHI)	46.80	59.40	40.60	58.80	48.00	253.60
7	Norka Sabando (ECU)	50.40	56.00	36.40	35.10	49.20	227.10
8	Lisette Ramírez (VEN)	46.80	39.60	37.80	46.20	49.00	219.40
9	Rafaela Suárez (ECU)	52.80	48.60	25.20	39.20	44.40	210.20
10	Paula Sotomayor (CHI)	52.65	29.40	44.80	58.80	23.80	209.45
