= Diving at the 2012 Summer Olympics – Women's synchronized 10 metre platform =

Women's synchronised 10 metre platform at the Games of the XXX Olympiad
- Venue: Aquatics Centre
- Date: 31 July
- Competitors: 16 from 8 nations

Medalists
1st place, gold medalist(s)		Chen Ruolin; Wang Hao	China
2nd place, silver medalist(s)		Paola Espinosa; Alejandra Orozco	Mexico
3rd place, bronze medalist(s)		Meaghan Benfeito; Roseline Filion	Canada

The women's synchronised 10 metre platform diving competition at the 2012 Olympic Games in London took place on 31 July at the Aquatics Centre within the Olympic Park.

The Chinese team of Chen Ruolin and Wang Hao won the gold medal.

== Format ==
A single round was held, with each team making five dives. Eleven judges scored each dive: three for each diver, and five for synchronisation. Only the middle score counted for each diver, with the middle three counting for synchronisation. These five scores were averaged, multiplied by 3, and multiplied by the dive's degree of difficulty to give a total dive score. The scores for each of the five dives were summed to give a final score.

== Schedule ==
Times are British Summer Time (UTC+1)

Date	Time	Round
Tuesday 31 July 2012	15:00	Final

== Results ==
Rank	Divers	Dives					Total
Rank	Divers	1	2	3	4	5	Total
1st place, gold medalist(s)	China; Chen Ruolin; Wang Hao	53.40 (53.40) 2=	56.40 (109.80) 1	81.00 (190.80) 1	89.28 (280.08) 1	88.32 (368.40) 1	368.40
2nd place, silver medalist(s)	Mexico; Paola Espinosa; Alejandra Orozco	51.60 (51.60) 7=	50.40 (102.00) 7	84.40 (186.40) 2	75.24 (261.64) 2	81.60 (343.24) 2	343.24
3rd place, bronze medalist(s)	Canada; Meaghan Benfeito; Roseline Filion	53.40 (53.40) 2=	52.80 (106.20) 4	75.60 (181.80) 3	73.26 (255.06) 3	82.56 (337.62) 3	337.62
4	Australia; Loudy Wiggins; Rachel Bugg	52.20 (52.20) 6	50.40 (102.60) 6	72.90 (175.50) 7	70.29 (245.79) 4	77.76 (323.55) 4	323.55
5	Great Britain; Sarah Barrow; Tonia Couch	54.00 (54.00) 1	53.40 (107.40) 2	68.16 (175.56) 6	68.40 (243.96) 6	77.76 (321.72) 5	321.72
6	Germany; Nora Subschinski; Christin Steuer	53.40 (53.40) 2=	49.80 (103.20) 5	76.80 (180.00) 4	64.38 (244.38) 5	68.40 (312.78) 6	312.78
7	Malaysia; Leong Mun Yee; Pandelela Rinong	52.80 (52.80) 5	54.00 (106.80) 3	70.20 (177.00) 5	60.48 (237.48) 7	71.04 (308.52) 7	308.52
8	Ukraine; Yulia Prokopchuk; Viktoriya Potyekhina	51.60 (51.60) 7=	49.80 (101.40) 8	68.16 (169.56) 8	64.80 (234.36) 8	65.28 (299.64) 8	299.64
