= Rafael Quintero (diver) =

Puerto Rican diver (born 1994)

Personal information
- Full name: Rafael Roberto Quintero Díaz
- Nickname: Rafa
- Born: July 24, 1994 (age 31) Canóvanas, Puerto Rico
- Height: 5 ft 9 in (1.75 m)
- Weight: 156 lb (71 kg)

Sport
- Country: Puerto Rico
- Sport: Diving
- Event(s): 1 m, 3 m, 10 m
- College team: Arizona Wildcats
Medal record
Men's diving
Representing Puerto Rico
Central American and Caribbean Games
Bronze medal – third place	2014 Veracruz	1 m springboard
Bronze medal – third place	2014 Veracruz	10 m platform

Rafael Roberto Quintero Díaz (born July 24, 1994) is a Puerto Rican diver. He competed in the men's 10 m platform event at the 2016 Summer Olympics.
