= Diving at the 2022 World Aquatics Championships – Mixed synchronized 10 metre platform =

Mixed synchronized 10 metre platform at the 2022 World Aquatics Championships
- Venue: Danube Arena
- Location: Budapest, Hungary
- Dates: 1 July
- Competitors: 18 from 9 nations
- Teams: 9
- Winning points: 341.16

Medalists
gold medal	Duan Yu; Ren Qian	China
silver medal	Oleksiy Sereda; Sofiya Lyskun	Ukraine
bronze medal	Carson Tyler; Delaney Schnell	United States

The Mixed synchronized 10 metre platform competition at the 2022 World Aquatics Championships was held on 1 July 2022.

== Results ==
The final was started at 19:00.

Rank	Nation	Divers	Points
1st place, gold medalist(s)	China	Duan Yu; Ren Qian	341.16
2nd place, silver medalist(s)	Ukraine	Oleksiy Sereda; Sofiya Lyskun	317.01
3rd place, bronze medalist(s)	United States	Carson Tyler; Delaney Schnell	315.90
4	Germany	Lou Massenberg; Elena Wassen	286.38
5	Italy	Eduard Timbretti; Sarah Jodoin Di Maria	269.34
6	Cuba	Carlos Ramos; Anisley García	263.91
7	South Korea	Yi Jaeg-yeong; Cho Eun-bi	249.39
8	France	Gary Hunt; Jade Gillet	246.39
9	Australia	Domonic Bedggood; Melissa Wu	243.12
