= Isaac Souza =

Brazilian diver (born 1999)

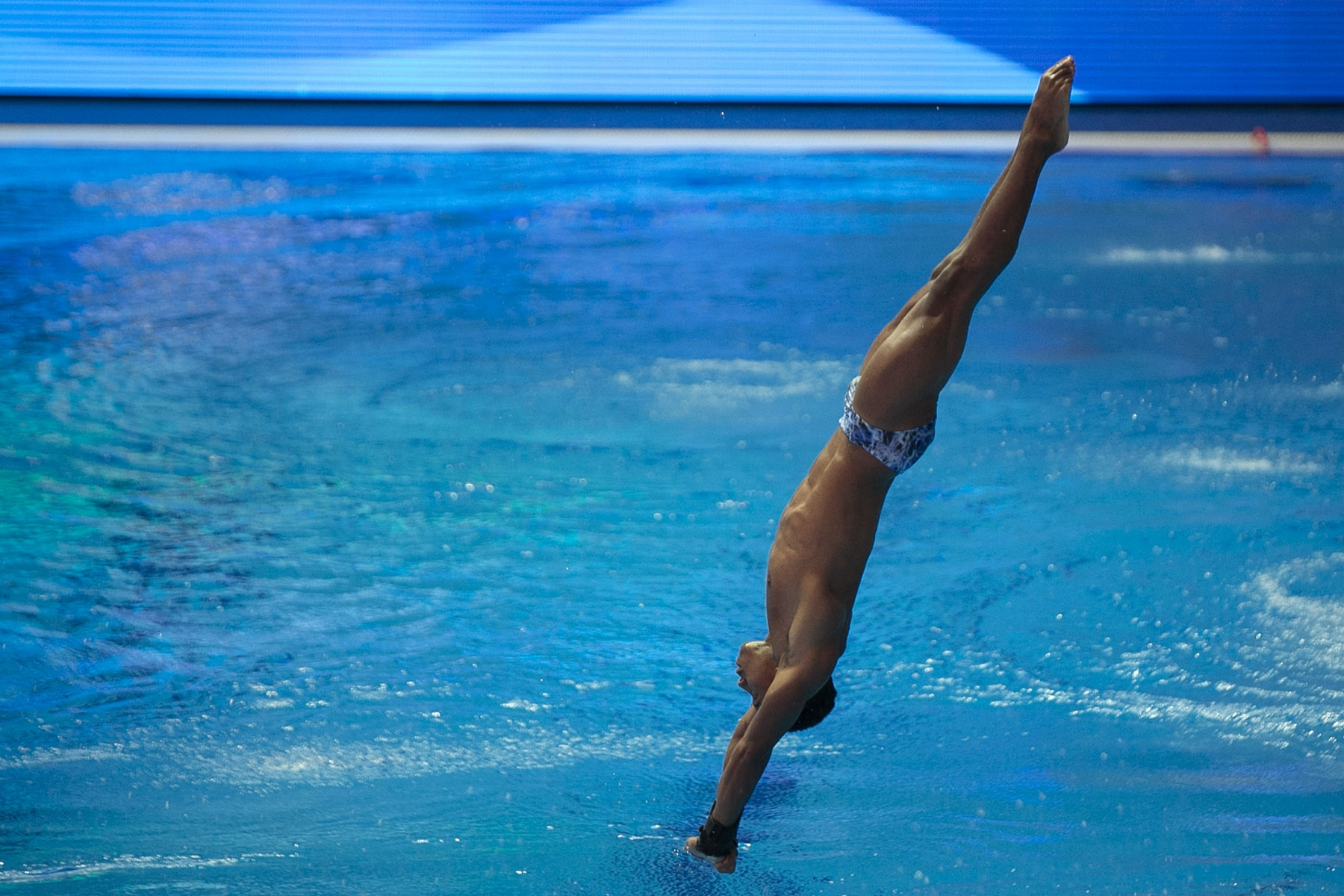

Personal information
- Nationality: Brazil
- Born: 23 June 1999 (age 27) Rio de Janeiro, Brazil
- Height: 1.63 m (5 ft 4 in)
- Weight: 59 kg (130 lb)

Sport
- Sport: Diving
- Event: 10 metre springboard
Medal record
Men's diving
Representing Brazil
Pan American Games
| Bronze medal – third place | 2019 Lima | 10 m synchro |
South American Games
| Silver medal – second place | 2018 Cochabamba | 10 m platform |
Military World Games
| Bronze medal – third place | 2019 Wuhan | Team |

Isaac Nascimento de Souza Filho (born 23 June 1999) is a Brazilian diver. He competed in the 2020 Summer Olympics.

== Career ==
Isaac started in gymnastics, but ended up choosing to stay in diving. From his brief experience in gymnastics, he took several movements to his performances on the platform. He entered the International Olympic Committee (IOC) Olympic solidarity program, which provides scholarships to athletes with potential.

He won a silver medal at the 2018 South American Games held in Cochabamba.

At the 2019 Pan American Games, he won a bronze medal in the Men's synchronized 10 metre platform.

At the 2020 Olympic Games in Tokyo, he finished 20th in the Men's 10 metre platform.

At the 2022 World Aquatics Championships he finished 9th in the Men's synchronized 10 metre platform.

At the 2023 World Aquatics Championships he finished 9th in the Men's 10 metre platform. It was the best result ever for Brazil in World Championships, on the men's platform.
