= Carson Tyler =

American diver (born 2004)

Personal information
- Born: June 9, 2004 (age 22) Moultrie, Georgia, U.S.
- Home town: Moultrie, Georgia, U.S.
- Education: Colquitt County High School; Indiana University Bloomington
- Height: 5 ft 8 in (173 cm)

Sport
- Country: United States
- Sport: Diving
- College team: Indiana Hoosiers
Medal record
Men's diving
Representing the United States
World Championships
Bronze medal – third place	2022 Budapest	10 m mixed synchro
Bronze medal – third place	2025 Singapore	10 m synchro
Junior Pan American Games
Bronze medal – third place	2021 Cali-Valle	1 m Springboard
Bronze medal – third place	2021 Cali-Valle	Team event
Representing the Indiana Hoosiers
NCAA Championships
Gold medal – first place	2025 Federal Way	3 m Springboard
Gold medal – first place	2025 Federal Way	Platform
Gold medal – first place	2024 Indianapolis	3 m Springboard
Gold medal – first place	2024 Indianapolis	Platform
Gold medal – first place	2023 Minneapolis	Platform
Bronze medal – third place	2024 Indianapolis	1 m Springboard

Carson Tyler (born June 9, 2004) is an American diver who became the third American to qualify at the US Olympic trials in both the men's 10 m platform and 3 m springboard events. He is a diver for the Indiana Hoosiers where he has won three NCAA Championships.

== Career ==
In 2022, Tyler competed in the world championships where he won a bronze medal in the 10-meter mixed synchronized platform on July 1, where he scored 315.90 points with his partner Delaney Schnell in the final.

In 2024, he qualified for the U.S. Olympic Diving Team, to compete in the men's 10 m platform. He won the men's 10 m trial with a combined score of 965.45 (488.25 in the finals), beating out 2020 Olympian Brandon Loschiavo for the US spot in the event. Later during the Olympic Trials he also qualified for the 2024 Summer Olympics in Paris in the men's 3 m springboard. He finished second in the 3 m, behind fellow Hoosier and 2020 silver medalist Andrew Capobianco. With the 3 m springboard qualification, Tyler became only the third individual to qualify for the US Olympic team in both events, after Greg Louganis and Mark Ruiz, and the first to qualify for both events since 2000. He finished fourth in the 3 m springboard event, with a final score of 429.25. He finished nineteenth in the 10 m platform event, with a final score of 363.75
