= Sarah Bacon =

American diver (born 1996)

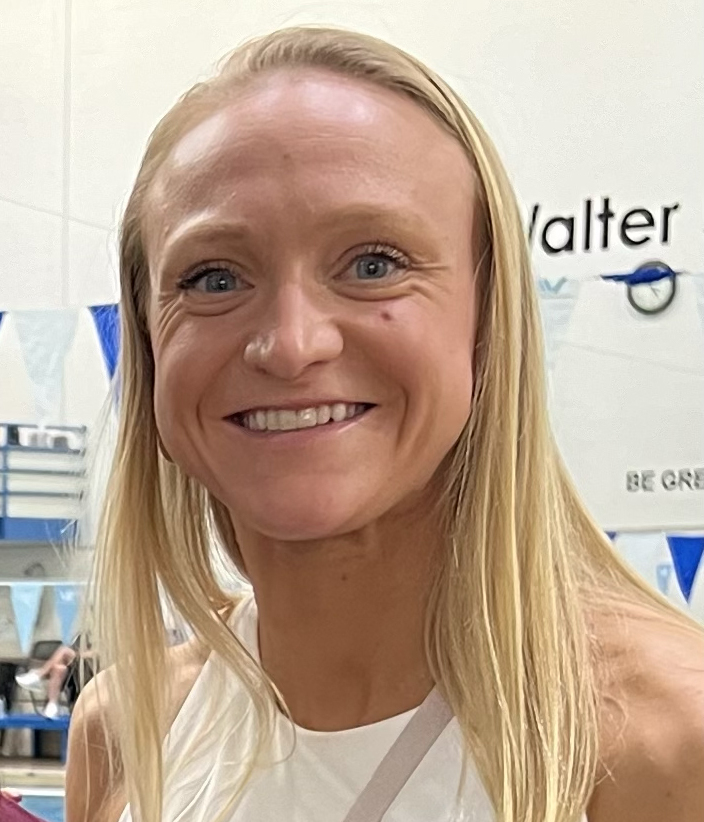
- Bacon in 2024

Personal information
- Born: September 20, 1996 (age 29) Indianapolis, Indiana, U.S.
- Height: 5 ft 4 in (163 cm)
- Weight: 118 lb (54 kg)

Sport
- Country: United States
- Sport: Diving
- Event(s): 3 meter springboard, 3 meter synchro
- College team: University of Minnesota
- Club: Minnesota Diving Academy
Medal record
Women's diving
Representing the United States
Olympic Games
Silver medal – second place	2024 Paris	3 m synchro
World Championships
Silver medal – second place	2019 Gwangju	1 m springboard
Silver medal – second place	2022 Budapest	1 m springboard
Pan American Games
Gold medal – first place	2019 Lima	1 m springboard
Silver medal – second place	2019 Lima	3 m synchro

Sarah Bacon (born September 20, 1996) is an American diver. She earned her first Olympic medal in the 2024 Summer Olympics, winning silver in the women's synchronized 3 metre springboard with Kassidy Cook.

== High school career ==
Bacon has been diving since 2004. Her first major competitive accomplishments were in 2014 when she was named the NISCA All-American Champion; in the same year she won in both the 1-meter and 3-meter springboard events at the 2014 Junior National Diving Championships, as well as the 1-meter event at the AT&T Senior National Diving Championships. She was the team captain for the FINA World Junior Diving Championships.

== College career ==
After graduating from Cardinal Ritter High School, she went to the University of Minnesota. She performed well right away finishing 2nd against Wisconsin in the 1-meter event, and during her freshman year she was in 2nd place in 1-meter diving event at the 2017 NCAA Championships, 3rd and 4th place at the 3-meter and 1-meter diving event at the 2017 Big Ten Championships, respectively. She won in both the 1-meter and 3-meter events against Iowa, and 1st in 1-meter at the Minnesota Challenge. She also placed 4th at the world championship trials in the 3-meter event.

During her sophomore year (2017–2018) she was 1st in the 1-meter event at the NCAA Championships and the Big Ten Championships; she also was 2nd in the 3-meter event. She also finished 1st in both categories against Northwestern and Purdue, and took 1st in the 1-meter dive at both the Tennessee Collegiate Diving Invitational and the Minnesota Diving Invitational. In 2018 she was 2nd at the USA Diving Winter Trials for the 1-meter dive and 3rd in the USA Diving Senior National Championships for the synchronized 3-meter dive with her partner, Kristen Hayden.

During her junior year (2018–2019) she became the 2019 Big Ten Diver of the Year and the NCAA 1-meter diving champion, in the process breaking a previous 12 year record with a score of 363.20. Additionally she set the school and pool record for the 3-meter dive in the Big Ten Championships, with a score of 430.60.

In 2019 she won the 1-meter (299.10) and 3rd (307.90) in the 3-meter, as well as 2nd in the 3-meter synchronized dive with Hayden (286.80), at the USA Diving National Championships. While competing for the USA she came in 2nd in the 1-meter dive (262.00) at the 2019 World Aquatics Championships in Gwangju. Later in 2019, competing for the US she and partner Brooke Schultz won silver in the women's synchronized 3 m springboard event and then won the women's individual 1 m Springboard event (284.10) at the 2019 Pan American Games in Lima, Peru.

In 2020, Bacon won the USA diving national championships in 3 meter synchro with her partner Kassidy Cook. They then went to the FINA grand prix in Madrid, Spain winning gold in 3 meter synchro. Bacon took silver in the individual 3 meter event as well. In 2020, she also competed in the Grand Prix meet in Rostock, Germany; she and Cook won gold in 3 meter synchro.

== Olympic career ==
Bacon, with her partner and longtime friend Kassidy Cook, qualified for the 2024 Paris Olympics on the 3 meter synchronized springboard for the United States. She also qualified in the 3m individual event.

On July 27, 2024, Cook and Bacon won the first medals for the United States at the 2024 Olympics, earning silver in the 3 meter synchronized springboard event.
