= Caeli McKay =

Canadian diver (born 1999)

Personal information
- Full name: Caeli Sierra McKay Riendeau
- Born: Caeli Sierra McKay; 25 June 1999 (age 27) Calgary, Alberta, Canada
- Home town: Montreal, Quebec
- Height: 160 cm (5 ft 3 in)
- Weight: 53 kg (117 lb)
- Spouse: Vincent Riendeau

Sport
- Country: Canada
- Sport: Diving
Medal record
Representing Canada
World Championships
Bronze medal – third place	2023 Fukuoka	10 m platform
Pan American Games
Gold medal – first place	2019 Lima	10 m synchro
Silver medal – second place	2019 Lima	10 m platform
Silver medal – second place	2023 Santiago	10 m synchro
Bronze medal – third place	2023 Santiago	10 m platform
Commonwealth Games
Silver medal – second place	2018 Gold Coast	10 m synchro
Bronze medal – third place	2022 Birmingham	10 m platform

Caeli Sierra McKay Riendeau (née McKay, born 25 June 1999) is a former Canadian diver. She competed in the women's 10 metre platform event at the 2019 World Aquatics Championships. In June 2021, she qualified to represent Canada at the 2020 Summer Olympics. She finished fourth of the women's 10 metre platform event at the 2024 Summer Olympics.

== Endorsements ==
McKay was featured on General Mills and Nestlé's Cinnamon Toast Crunch cereal lines packaging.

== Personal life ==
She is married to diver Vincent Riendeau.
