= Gabriela Agúndez =

Mexican diver (born 2000)

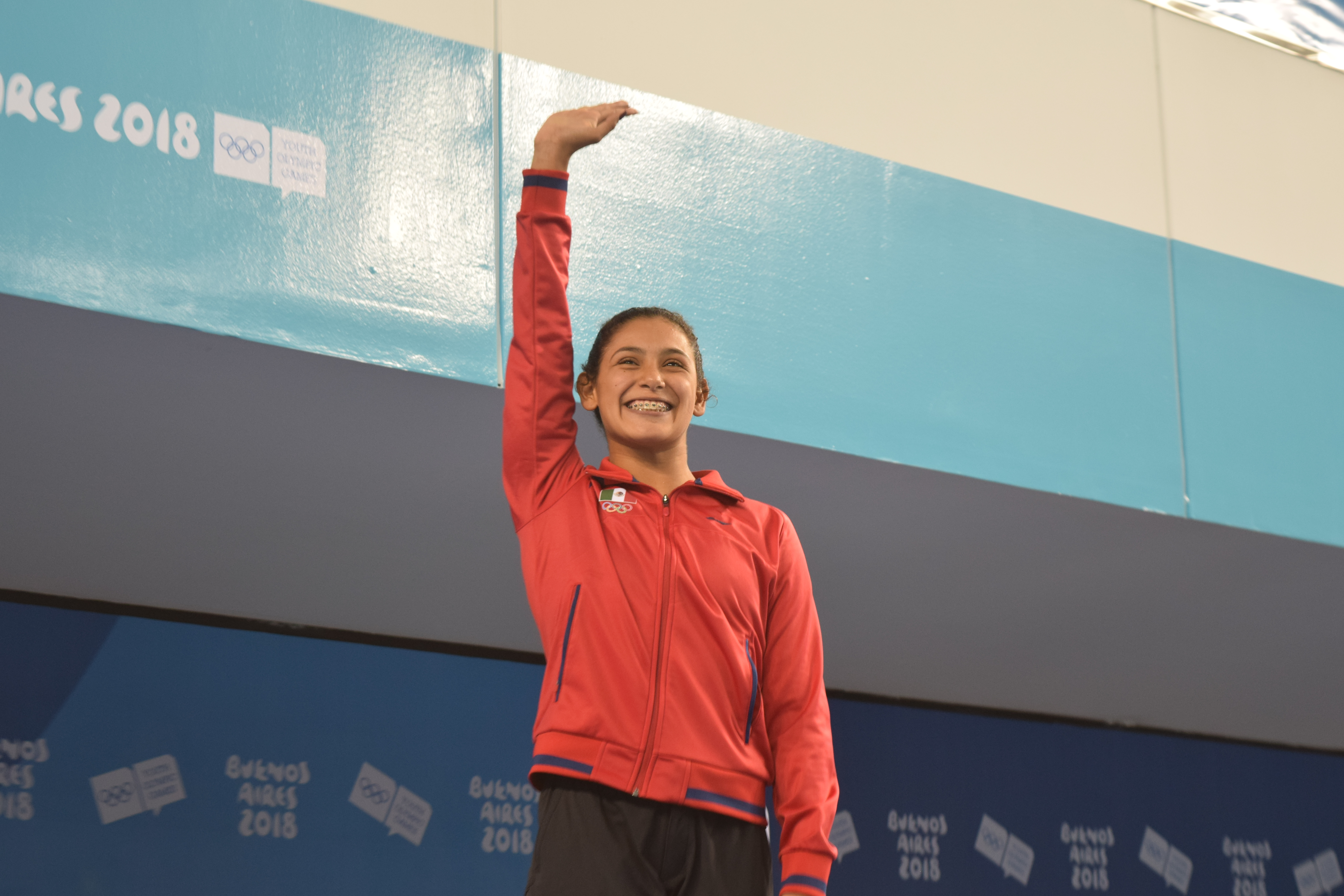
- Agúndez at the 2018 Summer Youth Olympics

Personal information
- Full name: Gabriela Belem Agúndez Garcia
- Born: 4 August 2000 (age 25) La Paz, Mexico
- Height: 1.56 m (5 ft 1 in)

Sport
- Country: Mexico
- Sport: Diving
Medal record
Women's diving
Representing Mexico
Olympic Games
Bronze medal – third place	2020 Tokyo	10 m synchro
World Championships
Silver medal – second place	2023 Fukuoka	Team
Silver medal – second place	2024 Doha	Team event
Silver medal – second place	2025 Singapore	10 m synchro
Pan American Games
Gold medal – first place	2023 Santiago	10 m platform
Gold medal – first place	2023 Santiago	10 m synchro
Silver medal – second place	2019 Lima	10 m synchro
Youth Olympic Games
Bronze medal – third place	2018 Buenos Aires	10 m platform

Gabriela Belem Agúndez Garcia (Note: In this Spanish name, the first or paternal surname is Agúndez and the second or maternal family name is Garcia.) (born 4 August 2000) is a Mexican diver. She represented Mexico at the 2020 Summer Olympics in Tokyo, Japan in the individual 10 metre platform and synchronized 10 metre platform (with Alejandra Orozco), winning a bronze medal.

== Other competition results ==
- 2014 Central American and Caribbean Games, 10 metre platform, bronze medal
- 2017 World Aquatics Championships, 10 metre platform, 15th place
- 2017 World Aquatics Championship, synchronized 10 metre platform, 9th place (with Samantha Jiménez)
- 2018 Central American and Caribbean Games, 10 metre platform, bronze medal
- 2018 Summer Youth Olympics, 10 metre platform, bronze medal
- 2018 Summer Youth Olympics, 3 metre springboard, fifth place
- 2018 Summer Youth Olympics, mixed team, tenth place (with Antonio Volpe of Italy)
- 2019 World Aquatics Championships, 10 metre platform, 32nd place
- 2019 World Aquatics Championships, synchronized 10 metre platform, ninth place (with Alejandra Orozco)
- 2019 Pan American Games, 10 metre platform, sixth place
- 2019 Pan American Games, synchronized 10 metre platform, silver medal (with Alejandra Orozco)
