= Brooke Schultz =

American diver

Personal information
- Nationality: American
- Born: January 20, 1999 (age 27)

Sport
- Sport: Diving
- College team: University of Arkansas
Medal record
Pan American Games
Silver medal – second place	2019 Lima	1 m springboard
Silver medal – second place	2019 Lima	3 m synchro
Bronze medal – third place	2019 Lima	3 m springboard

Brooke Schultz (born January 20, 1999) is an American diver. She competed in the women's 3 metre springboard event at the 2019 World Aquatics Championships.
