= Vincent Riendeau (diver) =

Canadian diver (born 1996)

Personal information
- Born: December 13, 1996 (age 29) Montreal, Quebec, Canada
- Height: 170 cm (5 ft 7 in)
- Weight: 73 kg (161 lb)
- Spouse: Caeli McKay

Sport
- Country: Canada
- Club: Pointe-Claire Diving Club
Medal record
Men's Diving
Representing Canada
World Championships
Silver medal – second place	2015 Kazan	Mixed 10 m synchro
Diving World Cup
Bronze medal – third place	2021 Tokyo	Synchro 10 metre platform
Pan American Games
Silver medal – second place	2015 Toronto	10 m synchro
Silver medal – second place	2019 Lima	10 m synchro
Bronze medal – third place	2019 Lima	10 m platform
Commonwealth Games
Bronze medal – third place	2014 Glasgow	10 m platform
Bronze medal – third place	2018 Gold Coast	10 m platform

Vincent Riendeau (born December 13, 1996) is a Canadian elite diver. He won a silver medal at the 2015 FINA World Championships in the 10 m mixed synchro event and a silver medal at the 2015 Pan American Games in the 10 m synchro event. He competed at several World Cups and Grand Prix events.

== Career ==
He was selected as part of the Canadian Olympic team for the 2016 games in Rio and competed in the 10m platform alongside Maxim Bouchard.

At the 2019 edition of the event, along with his partner Nathan Zsombor-Murray finished in 11th place in the men's 10 m synchro event. Under a month later, the pair won silver in the same event at the 2019 Pan American Games in Lima, Peru.

At the 2021 FINA Diving World Cup, Riendeau and Zsombor-Murray won bronze in the 10 m synchro event, claiming Canada an Olympic berth. In June 2021, Riendeau was officially named to represent Canada at the 2020 Summer Olympics.

== Personal life ==
He is married to diver Caeli McKay.
