= Deidre Freeman =

American diver

Personal information
- Born: August 26, 1988 (age 37) Grinnell, Iowa, United States

Sport
- Sport: Diving
Medal record
Representing United States
Pan American Games
Bronze medal – third place	2015 Toronto	10m platform synchro

Deidre Freeman (born August 26, 1988) is an American diver.

The daughter of Will Freeman, a pole-vaulter, Freeman was born in Grinnell, Iowa, and began diving when she was 14. At high school she was a state runner-up as a senior, and placed fourth as a junior. She was a three-time conference champion, All-State, All-District, All-Conference, and team MVP, setting Grinnell High School's 6-dive record and ranking third in Iowa high school history for an 11-dive score. Having studied at the University of Iowa, where she was a two-time All-American performer, The 2013 U.S. national champion on the 3m board, Freeman earned her place in the World Diving Championships by taking second place on 1 Meter and first place on 3 Meter at the 2013 USA Diving World Championships Trials.

She has competed in 9 US national events and participated in the 2012 US Olympic Trials, taking 4th in the synchronized event and 18th in the 3-meter event. The same year, she was the United States' synchronized representative at the Canada Cup. She currently coaches at Grinnell College.
