= Giovanna Pedroso =

Brazilian diver (born 1998)

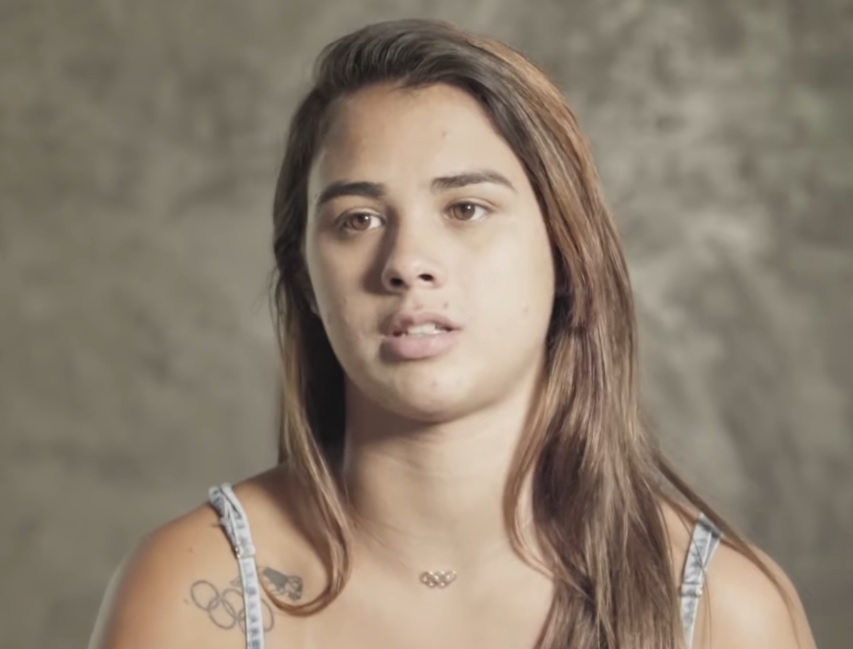
- Giovanna Pedroso in 2016

Personal information
- Born: 15 October 1998 (age 27) Rio de Janeiro, Brazil

Sport
- Sport: Diving
- Event: synchronized 10 metre platform
Medal record
Women's diving
Representing Brazil
Pan American Games
Silver medal – second place	2015 Toronto	10 m synchro
Bronze medal – third place	2023 Santiago	10 m synchro

Giovanna Pedroso (born 15 October 1998) is a Brazilian diver. She competed in the synchronized women's 10 metre platform at the 2016 Summer Olympics, where she and Ingrid Oliveira finished 8th out of 8 teams.
