= Pamela Ware =

Canadian diver (born 1993)

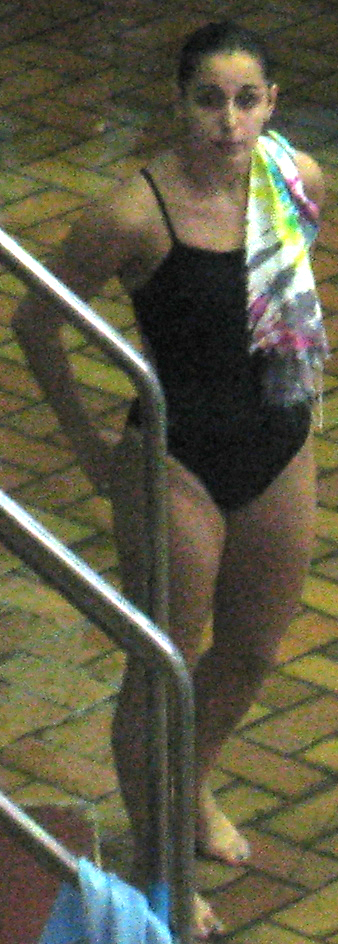
- Ware in 2013

Personal information
- Full name: Pamela Lina Ware
- Born: February 12, 1993 (age 33) Greenfield Park, Quebec, Canada
- Height: 1.61 m (5 ft 3 in)
- Weight: 52 kg (115 lb)

Sport
- Country: Canada
- Event(s): 3 metres & 3 metres synchro
- Club: CAMO
- Partner: Jennifer Abel
- Coached by: Aaron Dziver
Medal record
World Championships
Silver medal – second place	2015 Kazan	3 m synchro
Bronze medal – third place	2013 Barcelona	3 m springboard
Bronze medal – third place	2013 Barcelona	3 m synchro
Bronze medal – third place	2023 Fukuoka	3 m springboard
Commonwealth Games
Silver medal – second place	2014 Glasgow	3 m synchro
Pan American Games
Gold medal – first place	2019 Lima	3 m synchro
Gold medal – first place	2023 Santiago	1 m springboard
Gold medal – first place	2023 Santiago	3 m springboard
Silver medal – second place	2015 Toronto	3 m springboard
Silver medal – second place	2015 Toronto	3 m synchro
Silver medal – second place	2023 Santiago	3 m synchro

Pamela Lina Ware (born February 12, 1993) is a Canadian diver. She is currently partnered with Jennifer Abel for synchronized diving. Ware has two bronze medals from the 2013 World Aquatics Championships where she won in the synchronized 3 m event with Abel as well as individual bronze in the 3 m. She is also the silver medallist in the 3 m springboard at the 2015 Pan American Games, finishing second to Abel.

== Career ==
Ware competed at the 2009 Canada Games where she won two individual gold medals as a competitor for Quebec. She won her first major international hardware when she won bronze together with partner Abel at the 2013 World Championships. She next won her second bronze medal in the 3 m solo competition, setting a personal best of 350.25; her teammate Abel finished 5th.

Ware competed in the 2020 Olympics. In the 3-metre springboard, she aborted her dive and landed feet first, earning a score of zero and eliminating her from the finals. She said she avoided injury by aborting the dive after being out of rhythm.

== Personal life ==
Ware is married to Canadian Olympic boxer Wyatt Sanford.
