= Amy Cozad =

American Olympic diver

Amy Cozad Magaña
Personal information
- Nationality: American
- Born: 6 May 1991 (age 35) Indianapolis, United States
- Height: 1.57 m (5 ft 2 in)

Sport
- Sport: Diving
- Event: Synchronized 10 metre platform
- College team: Indiana Hoosiers
Medal record
Pan American Games
Bronze medal – third place	2019 Lima	10 m synchro

Amy Cozad Magaña (born 6 May 1991) is an American diver. She competed in the synchronized women's 10 metre platform at the 2016 Summer Olympics, where she and Jessica Parratto finished 7th out of 8 teams.

Cozad participated in college diving at Indiana University.
