= Dolores Hernández =

Mexican diver (born 1997)

Personal information
- Full name: Dolores Hernández Monzon
- Born: 21 May 1997 (age 29) Veracruz, Mexico
- Height: 1.64 m (5 ft 5 in)
Medal record
Women's diving
Representing Mexico
Summer Universiade
Gold medal – first place	2017 Taipei	1 m springboard
Gold medal – first place	2019 Naples	3 m synchro
Silver medal – second place	2019 Naples	Team
Silver medal – second place	2019 Naples	3 m springboard
Pan American Games
Gold medal – first place	2015 Toronto	3 m synchro
Silver medal – second place	2019 Lima	3 m springboard
Bronze medal – third place	2015 Toronto	3 m springboard
Bronze medal – third place	2019 Lima	3 m synchro
Central American and Caribbean Games
Gold medal – first place	2014 Veracruz	1 m springboard
Gold medal – first place	2014 Veracruz	3 m springboard
Gold medal – first place	2014 Veracruz	3 m synchro
- Updated on 20 August 2017

Dolores Hernández Monzon (Note: In this Spanish name, the first or paternal surname is Hernández and the second or maternal family name is Monzon.) (born 21 May 1997, in Veracruz) is a competitive diver from Mexico.

Hernández competed at the 2015 Pan American Games, where she won a gold medal in the synchronized 3 metre springboard event alongside Paola Espinosa, and a bronze medal in the individual 3 metre springboard competition.

She competed at the 2015 World Aquatics Championships.

== See also ==
- Mexico at the 2015 World Aquatics Championships
