= Delaney Schnell =

American diver

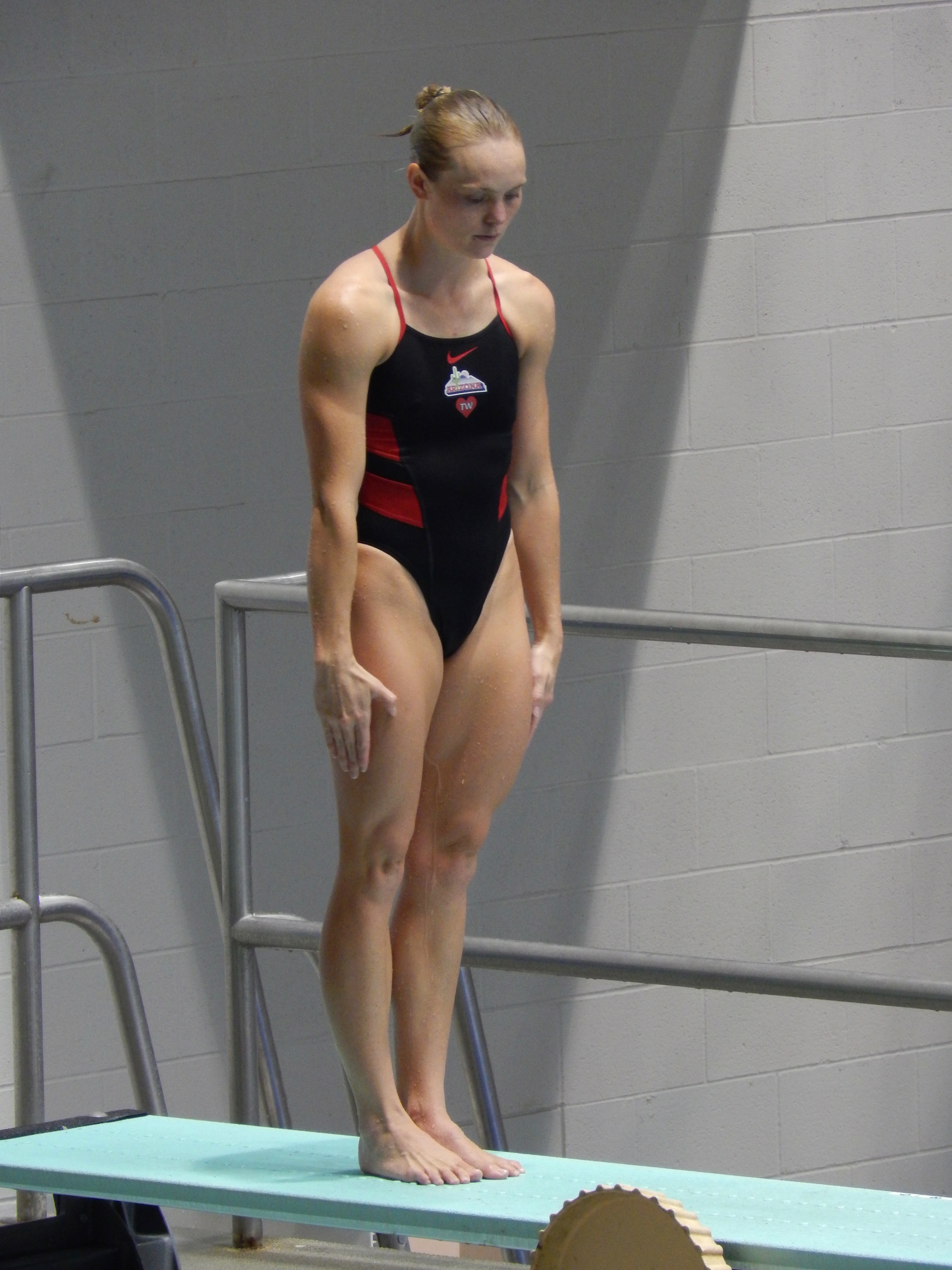
- Schnell in 2023

Personal information
- Nationality: American
- Born: December 21, 1998 (age 27) Iron Mountain, Michigan, U.S.
- Height: 5 ft 2 in (157 cm)

Sport
- Country: United States
- Sport: Diving
- Events: 10 m platform, 10 m synchro, 10 m mixed synchro
- College team: University of Arizona
Medal record
Women's diving
Representing United States
Olympic Games
Silver medal – second place	2020 Tokyo	10 m synchro
World Championships
Silver medal – second place	2022 Budapest	10 m synchro
Bronze medal – third place	2019 Gwangju	10 m platform
Bronze medal – third place	2022 Budapest	10 m mixed synchro
Bronze medal – third place	2023 Fukuoka	10 m synchro
Pan American Games
Bronze medal – third place	2019 Lima	10 m synchro

Delaney Schnell (born December 21, 1998) is an American diver. In the 10 meter platform, she won a bronze medal at the 2019 World Aquatics Championships. In the 10 meter synchronized platform, she won silver medals at the 2020 Summer Olympics and 2022 World Aquatics Championships as well as a bronze medal at the 2019 Pan American Games. In the 10 meter mixed synchronized platform, she won a bronze medal at the 2022 World Aquatics Championships. She competed collegiately for the University of Arizona after attending Tucson High School.

== Athletic career ==
=== 2019–2021 ===
At the 2019 World Aquatics Championships in Gwangju, South Korea in July, Schnell won a bronze medal in the 10 meter platform competition with a score of 364.20 points. The following month, at the 2019 Pan American Games held in Lima, Peru, she won a bronze medal in the 10 meter synchronized platform with her partner Amelia Magaña, scoring within 40 points of the gold medal duo from Canada with a mark of 281.10 points.

==== 2020 Summer Olympics ====
Schnell qualified to represent the United States at the 2020 Summer Olympics, held in Tokyo, Japan in 2021 due to the COVID-19 pandemic, in the 10 meter platform and the synchronized 10 meter platform (with Jessica Parratto). It was the first Olympic Games she qualified to compete in. Schnell and Parratto placed second in the synchronized 10 meter platform and won the silver medal, which was the first Olympic medal for the United States in the event. Individually, Schnell placed fifth in the final of the 10 meter platform event.

=== 2022 ===
At the 2022 Pac-12 Conference Championships, held at King County Aquatic Center in February 2022, Schnell won the 1 meter diving competition with a score of 332.55 points in the final. The next day, she placed second in the 3 meter diving competition with a final score of 369.30 points. On the third day of competition, she won the platform diving competition by over 17 points, scoring a total of 312.55 points in the final round of competition after scoring 308.60 points in the preliminary round.

==== 2022 NCAA Championships ====
On the second day of the 2022 NCAA Division I Championships, Schnell ranked first in the prelims of the 1 meter event with a score of 334.10 points. In the final of the event later in the day, she scored a total of 339.05 points and placed fifth. She scored 348.40 points during the preliminary round of competition in the 3 meter event on the third day, qualifying for the final ranking seventh. For the final round, she increased her score to 376.20 points and tied for fourth place. The final day of competition, she ranked first in the prelims heats of the platform diving event with a score of 351.50 points, qualifying for the final 1.30 points ahead of the second-ranked diver. In the final, she took second-place with a score of 345.10 points.

==== 2022 World Championships ====
For her first event of the 2022 World Aquatics Championships, the 10 meter synchronized platform on June 30 in Budapest, Hungary, Schnell won a silver medal, achieving a mark of 299.40 points in the final with her partner Katrina Young. The silver medal tied the highest medal placing by the United States in a synchronized diving event at a FINA World Aquatics Championships. In her second of two events, she won her second of two medals at the Championships, this time winning a bronze medal in the 10 meter mixed synchronized platform on July 1, where she scored 315.90 points with her partner Carson Tyler in the final.

=== 2023 ===
For her first event of the 2023 Pac-12 Conference Championships, the 1 meter springboard on day two, Schnell first achieved a score of 356.10 points for her six dives in the preliminaries to rank first, then won the conference title in the final with a mark of 355.50 points. It was her third-consecutive conference title in the event. Following a ranking of third in the preliminaries session of the 3 meter springboard the next day with a score of 330.50 points, she outscored the second highest-scoring competitor in the final by over 45 points with a final mark of 373.60 points that earned her the conference title in the event, which marked an improvement from her silver medal in the event at the 2022 Pac-12 Championships. Her score was less than 15 points behind the Championships record of 387.75 points set by Blythe Hartley in 2006. In the platform event on day four of four, she ranked first in the preliminaries with a score of 334.80 before going on to win the silver medal with a final mark of 325.05, which was 8.05 points behind the gold medalist.

==== 2023 NCAA Championships ====
In the 1 meter springboard event on day two of the 2023 NCAA Division I Championships in Knoxville, Tennessee, Schnell ranked fourth in the preliminaries with a score of 311.15 points before winning the silver medal with a score of 340.05 points in the final. The third day, she placed fourth in the 3 meter springboard with a final mark of 362.30 points after scoring 350.80 points in the preliminaries and qualifying for the final ranking second. On the final day of competition, she won the NCAA title in the 10 meter platform with a final score of 352.65 points that retained her first rank from the preliminaries, where she scored 323.95 points. It marked the first NCAA title for a male or female Arizona Wildcats swimmer or diver since March 27, 2015, when Kevin Cordes won the NCAA title in the 100 yard breaststroke.

== Awards and honors ==
- Pac-12 Conference, Scholar Athlete of the Year (women's swimming and diving): 2022–2023
- Pac-12 Conference, Diver of the Year (women's): 2022
- Pac-12 Conference, Diver of the Meet: 2021 Pac-12 Championships, 2022 Pac-12 Championships, 2023 Pac-12 Championships
- Pac-12 Conference, Diver of the Month (women's): November 2021
- Pac-12 Conference, Diver of the Week (women's): January 17, 2023, January 24, 2023, February 7, 2023
