= Roseline Filion =

Canadian diver (born 1987)

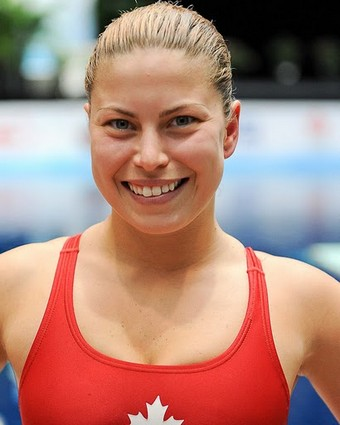

Personal information
- Born: July 3, 1987 (age 38) Laval, Quebec
- Home town: Laval, Quebec
- Height: 152 cm (5 ft 0 in)
- Weight: 52 kg (115 lb)

Sport
- Country: Canada
- Event(s): 10 metres & 10 metres synchro
- Club: Pointe-Claire Diving Club
- Partner: Meaghan Benfeito
- Coached by: Arturo Miranda
Medal record
Olympic Games
Bronze medal – third place	2012 London	10 m synchro
Bronze medal – third place	2016 Rio de Janeiro	10 m synchro
World Aquatics Championships
Silver medal – second place	2013 Barcelona	10 m synchro
Silver medal – second place	2015 Kazan	10 m synchro
Bronze medal – third place	2005 Montreal	10 m synchro
Commonwealth Games
Gold medal – first place	2014 Glasgow	10 m synchro
Bronze medal – third place	2006 Melbourne	10 m synchro
Bronze medal – third place	2014 Glasgow	10 m platform
Pan American Games
Gold medal – first place	2015 Toronto	10 m synchro
Silver medal – second place	2011 Guadalajara	10 m synchro
Silver medal – second place	2015 Toronto	10 m platform

Roseline Filion (born July 3, 1987) is a retired Canadian diver. She used to compete in the 10 m synchronized event with Meaghan Benfeito. Filion has twice won an Olympic bronze medal in the 10 m platform synchro event: at the 2012 Summer Olympics in London and the 2016 Summer Olympics in Rio de Janeiro. She has also won a bronze at the World Aquatics Championships and Commonwealth Games. She retired in January 2017.

== Career ==
She won a bronze medal at the 2005 World Aquatics Championships, but she and Benfeito have been unable to return to the medal podium at the Worlds since. In 2006, they won a bronze at the Commonwealth Games. At the 2008 Summer Olympics, they finished in 7th place. She won the bronze medal in the 10 m platform synchro at the 2012 Summer Olympics in London with her partner of seven years, Benfeito. After winning the medal Filion commented that "We're on top of the world right now. We've waited so long for this medal, we've worked so hard. Beijing was a little disappointing but we came back strong, more mature, ready and in top shape, and we just dived with our hearts today."

== Personal ==
Benfeito is considered a lifelong friend of Filion. She says that "We've known one another for our entire lives, so we have a really good relationship. It's more of a sisterhood relationship now. We could probably go to a restaurant and order for each other."

She took up diving after watching Annie Pelletier win a medal at the Atlanta Olympics.
