= Ingrid Oliveira =

Brazilian diver (born 1996)

Ingrid de Oliveira
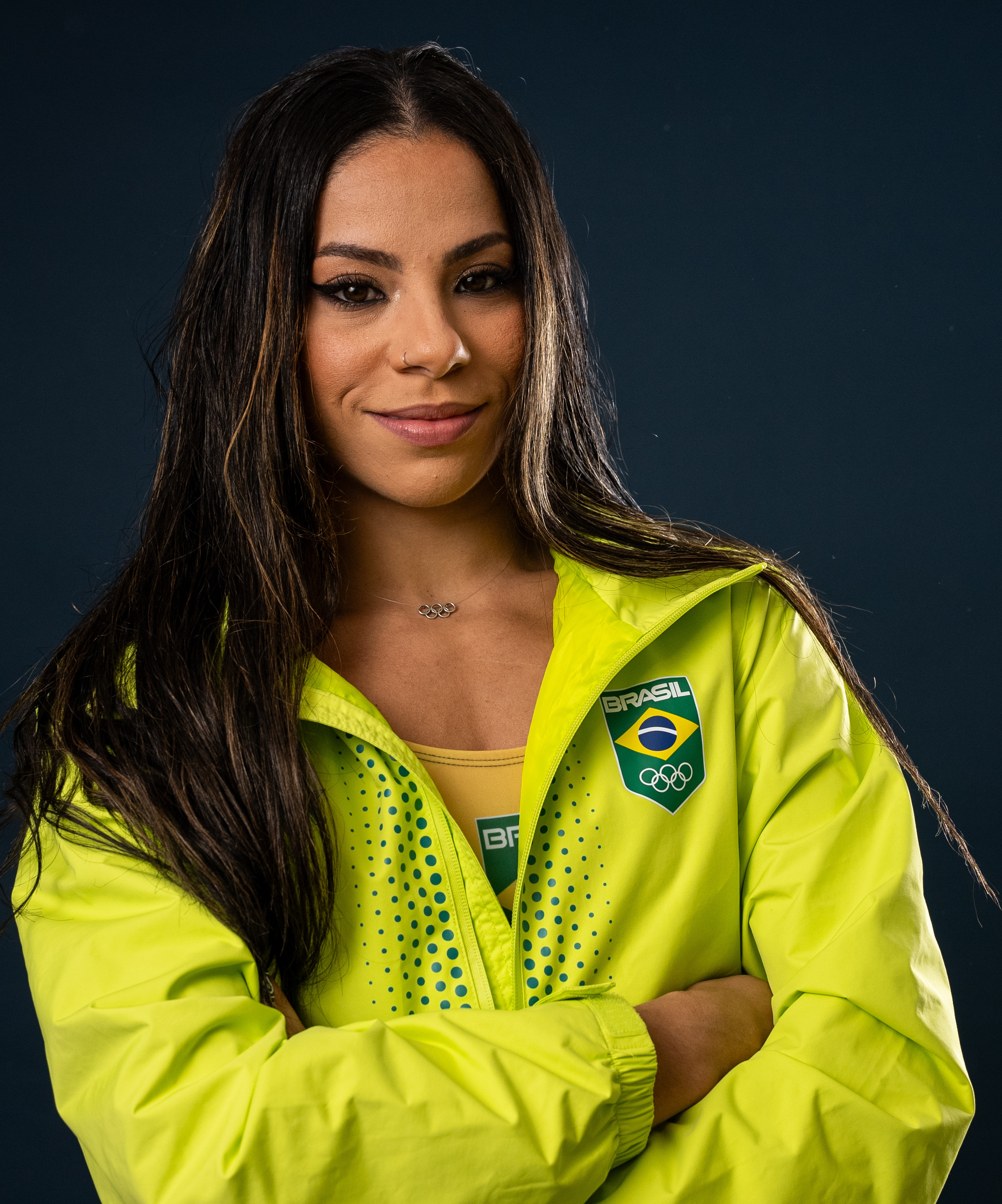
- Oliveira in 2023

Personal information
- Born: 7 May 1996 (age 30) Rio de Janeiro, Brazil
- Height: 160 cm (5 ft 3 in)
- Weight: 58 kg (128 lb)

Sport
- Sport: Diving
- Club: Fluminense
- Coached by: Andréia Boehme
Medal record
Women's diving
Representing Brazil
Pan American Games
Silver medal – second place	2015 Toronto	10 m synchro
Bronze medal – third place	2023 Santiago	10 m synchro
South American Games
Gold medal – first place	2018 Cochabamba	10 m platform
Bronze medal – third place	2018 Cochabamba	10 m synchro

Ingrid de Oliveira (born 7 May 1996) is a Brazilian competitive diver. One of the best divers in Brazilian history, she finished 4th in the 2022 World Aquatics Championships, in addition to having two medals in the Pan American Games and two in the South American Games. She participated in two Olympic Games, in 2016 and 2020, in addition to having qualified for the Paris 2024 Games.

== Career ==
At the 2014 Summer Youth Olympics she finished 5th in the Girls' 10 m platform.

She won a silver medal in Women's synchronized 10 metre platform diving at the 2015 Pan American Games in Toronto.

At the 2016 Summer Olympics in Rio de Janeiro, she finished 8th in the Women's synchronized 10 metre platform and 22nd in the Women's 10 metre platform.

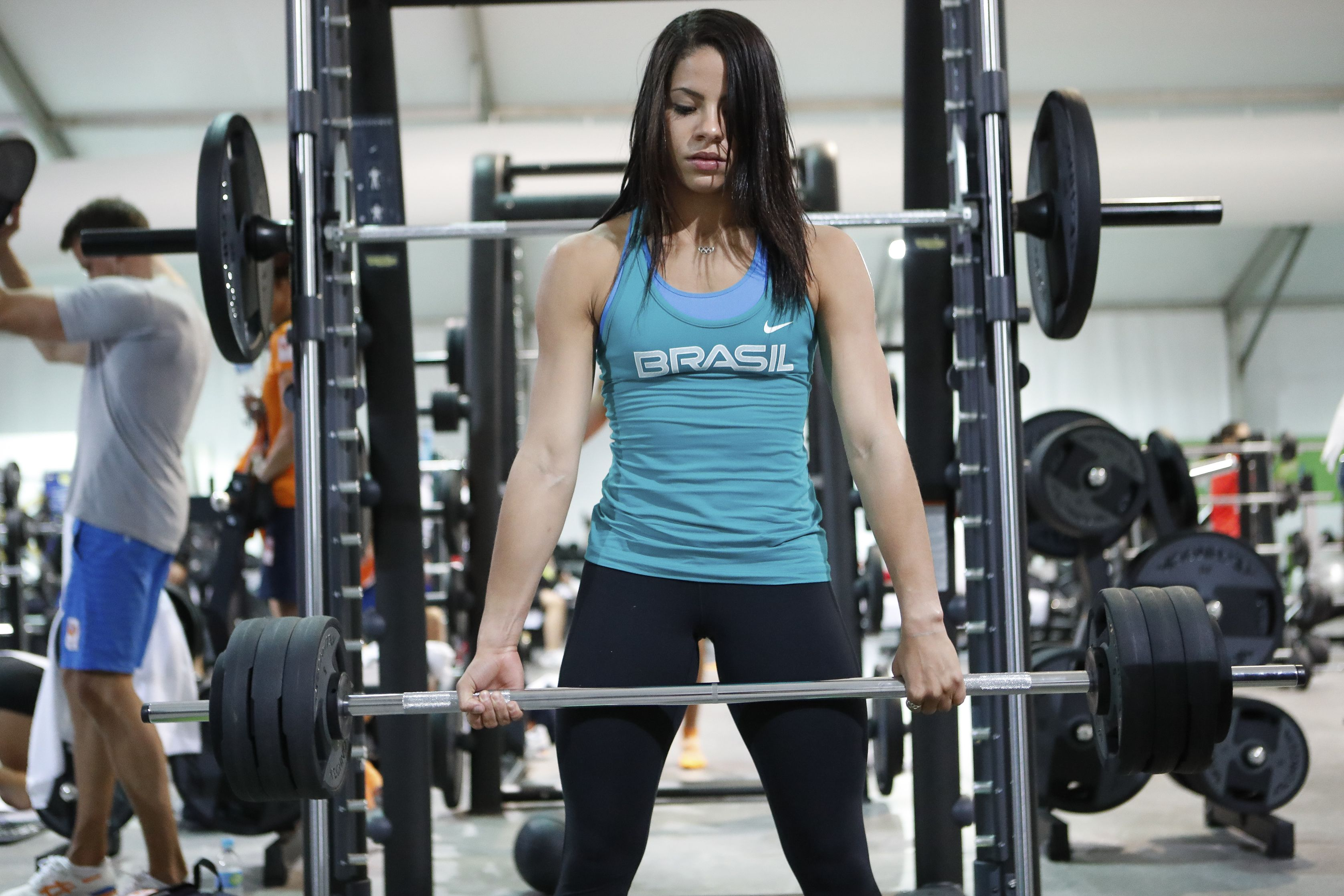
Oliveira in 2016

At the 2018 South American Games, she won gold in the individual 10m platform and bronze in the synchronized 10m platform.

She competed at the 2020 Tokyo Olympics, placing 24th in the Women's 10 metre platform. Her overall ranking after dives 1 though 5 were 10, 7, 8, 14 and 24, respectively.

At the 2022 World Aquatics Championships, she had the best performance in the history of Brazilian diving, obtaining fourth place in the 10 metre platform event.

At the 2023 World Aquatics Championships, she was again in the final, now finishing in 12th place in the Women's 10 metre platform.

At the 2023 Pan American Games, Ingrid de Oliveira and Giovanna Pedroso won the bronze medal in the Women's synchronized 10 metre platform.
