= María Betancourt (diver) =

Venezuelan diver (born 1994)

Personal information
- Full name: María Florencia Betancourt
- Born: 26 December 1994 (age 31) Venezuela

Sport
- Sport: diving

María Florencia Betancourt (born 26 December 1994) is a female diver from Venezuela. She won the gold medal in diving at the 2014 South American Games – Women's 3 metre springboard, and competed at the 2015 World Aquatics Championships, and other competitions throughoutthe 2010s.

== Career ==
At the age of 16, Betancourt participated in the 2011 Pan American Games, in Zapopan, Mexico. She came in ninth in diving at the 2011 Pan American Games – Women's 3 metre springboard, sixth in diving at the 2011 Pan American Games – Women's 10 metre platform, and, with teammate Lisette Ramirez, fifth in diving at the 2011 Pan American Games – Women's synchronized 10 metre platform.

At the 2013 World Aquatics Championships in Barcelona, she came in 17th in diving at the 2013 World Aquatics Championships – Women's 1 metre springboard, and seventh in diving at the 2013 World Aquatics Championships – Women's 10 metre platform.

Betancourt won the gold medal in diving at the 2014 South American Games – Women's 3 metre springboard, in Santiago, Chile, also participating in the Women's 10 metre platform.

At the 2016 World Diving Cup, however, Betancourt fell to 45th place.

Betancourt also competed at the 2017 World Aquatics Championships, 2018 South American Games, 2019 Pan American Games, 2019 World Aquatics Championships, and the 2021 FINA Diving World Cup.

Following her competitive career, Betancourt became a show diver for Royal Caribbean Cruise Lines.

== See also ==
- Venezuela at the 2015 World Aquatics Championships
