= Tammy Takagi =

Brazilian diver

Personal information
- Full name: Tammy Galera Takagi
- Born: 11 March 1991 (age 35) Brazil

Sport
- Sport: Diving
- Updated on 25 August 2015

Tammy Galera Takagi (Note: This name uses Portuguese naming customs: the first or maternal family name is Galera and the second or paternal family name is Takagi.) (born 11 March 1991) is a diver from Brazil.

She competed at the 2015 World Aquatics Championships in the women's synchronized 3 metre springboard, and the 2016 Summer Olympics.

== See also ==
- Brazil at the 2015 World Aquatics Championships
