= Diving at the 2016 Summer Olympics =

Diving at the Games of the XXXI Olympiad
- Venue: Maria Lenk Aquatic Center
- Dates: 7–20 August 2016
- No. of events: 8
- Competitors: 136 from 29 nations

The diving competitions at the 2016 Summer Olympics in Rio de Janeiro took place from 7 to 20 August at Maria Lenk Aquatic Center in Barra da Tijuca. It was one of four aquatic sports at the Games, along with swimming, water polo, and synchronised swimming.

The 2016 Games featured competitions in eight events (men and women events each of): 3m springboard, synchronised 3m springboard, 10m platform, and synchronised 10m platform.

The diving competitions featured up to 136 athletes. All divers had to be at least 14 years old on or by 31 December 2016.

On Tuesday August 9, the water of the diving well turned dark green, originally thought to be caused by the heat and lack of wind in the venue. However, at the time a CNN photographer took a picture, an adjacent pool in the same location was not green. Olympic officials later confirmed that the change in color was due to 160 litres of hydrogen peroxide having been mistakenly added to the pool during cleaning.

For the eighth consecutive Games, China dominated the medal table, and for the fourth occasion in that period were denied a clean sweep of diving golds by a single event; in this case, the 3 metre synchronised men's event won by Great Britain's Jack Laugher and Chris Mears, their nation's first ever gold medalists in the discipline.

== Qualification ==
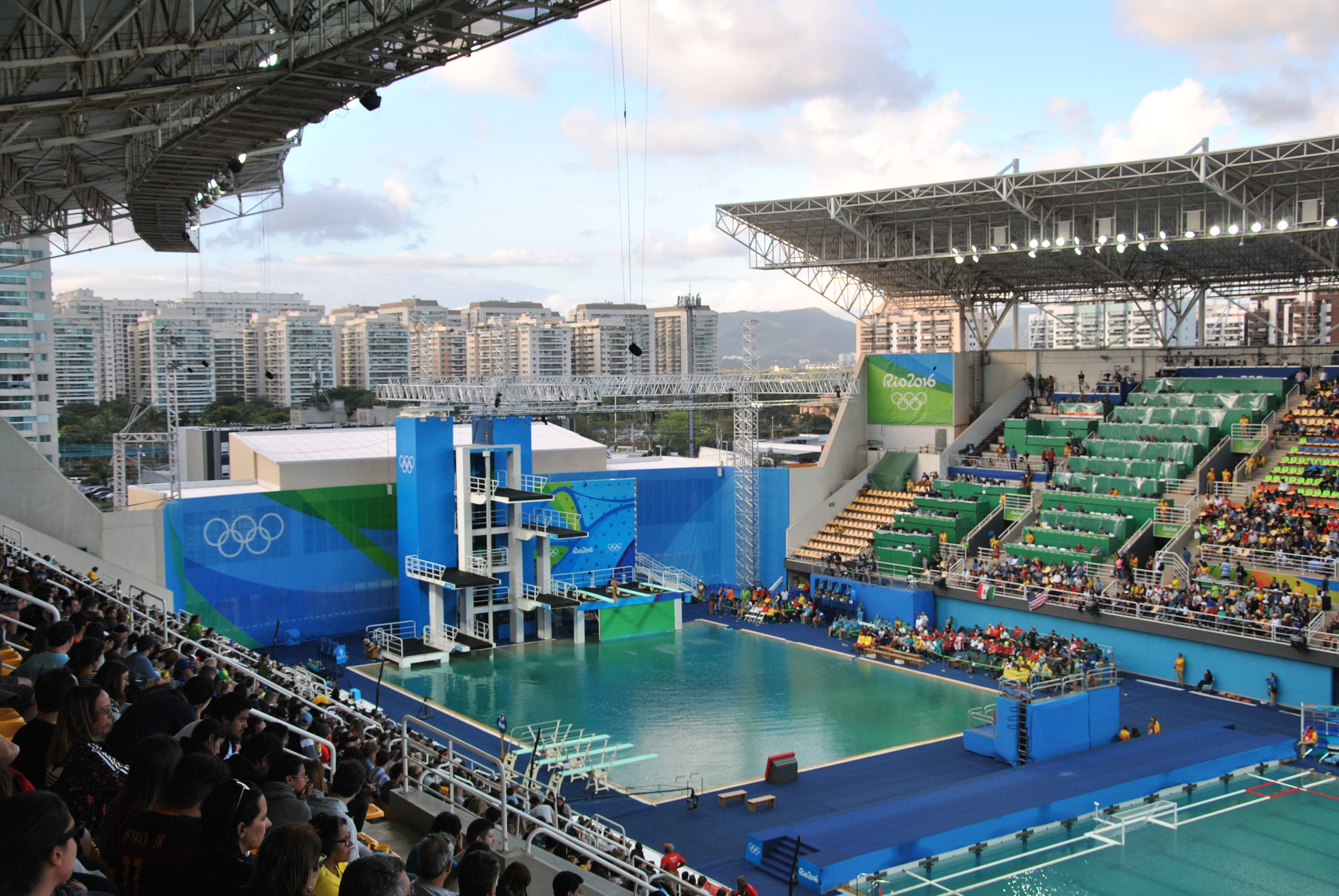
The Maria Lenk Aquatics Center's diving pool, during the 2016 Summer Olympics.

A nation could have no more than 16 divers qualify (up to eight males and eight females) and could enter up to two divers in individual events and one pair in synchronized events.

For the individual diving events, qualifiers were:

- the top 12 finishers in each event from the 2015 World Championships,
- the five continental champions in each event, and
- up to 18 semi-finalists from the 2016 FINA Diving World Cup.

For the synchronized events (pairs), qualifiers were:

- the top three finishers in each event from the 2015 World Championships,
- the top four from in each event the 2016 World Cup, and
- the host nation (Brazil).

Note: Qualifying spots went to the nation – they were not tied to the individual diver who achieved the place/finish at the qualifying event. However, an individual diver might only qualify one spot for their nation.

== Participating nations ==
136 athletes represented 29 nations in Diving at the 2016 Olympics:

- Australia (9)
- Austria (1)
- Belarus (2)
- Brazil (9)
- Canada (7)
- China (13)
- Colombia (4)
- Croatia (1)
- Egypt (4)
- France (3)
- Great Britain (11)
- Germany (8)
- Hungary (1)
- Ireland (1)
- Italy (8)
- Jamaica (1)
- Japan (3)
- Malaysia (6)
- Mexico (9)
- Netherlands (1)
- New Zealand (1)
- Panama (2)
- North Korea (3)
- Puerto Rico (1)
- Russia (8)
- South Africa (1)
- South Korea (1)
- Ukraine (7)
- United States (10)
- Venezuela (2)

== Schedule ==
All times are Brasília Time (UTC-3)

Day	Time	Event
Sunday 7 August	16:00–17:15	3m Springboard Synchronized Women
Monday 8 August	16:00–17:15	10m Platform Synchronized Men
Tuesday 9 August	16:00–17:15	10m Platform Synchronized Women
Wednesday 10 August	16:00–17:15	3m Springboard Synchronized Men
Friday 12 August	15:30–18:30	3m Springboard Women (Preliminaries)
Saturday 13 August	16:00–17:40	3m Springboard Women (Semifinal)
Sunday 14 August	16:00–17:30	3m Springboard Women (Final)
Monday 15 August	15:15–18:45	3m Springboard Men (Preliminaries)
Tuesday 16 August	10:00–11:50	3m Springboard Men (Semifinal)
Tuesday 16 August	18:00–20:10	3m Springboard Men (Final)
Wednesday 17 August	15:00–18:10	10m Platform Women (Preliminaries)
Thursday 18 August	10:00–11:30	10m Platform Women (Semifinal)
Thursday 18 August	16:00–17:30	10m Platform Women (Final)
Friday 19 August	16:00–19:10	10m Platform Men (Preliminaries)
Saturday 20 August	11:00–12:50	10m Platform Men (Semifinal)
Saturday 20 August	16:30–18:10	10m Platform Men (Final)

== Medalists ==
=== Medal table ===
Rank	Nation	Gold	Silver	Bronze	Total
1	China	7	2	1	10
2	Great Britain	1	1	1	3
3	United States	0	2	1	3
4	Italy	0	1	1	2
5	Malaysia	0	1	0	1
5	Mexico	0	1	0	1
7	Canada	0	0	2	2
8	Australia	0	0	1	1
8	Germany	0	0	1	1
Totals (9 entries)		8	8	8	24

=== Men ===
Event	Gold	Silver	Bronze
3 m springboard	Cao Yuan; China	Jack Laugher; Great Britain	Patrick Hausding; Germany
10 m platform	Chen Aisen; China	Germán Sánchez; Mexico	David Boudia; United States
Synchronized 3 m springboard	Chris Mears and Jack Laugher (GBR)	Sam Dorman and Michael Hixon (USA)	Cao Yuan and Qin Kai (CHN)
Synchronized 10 m platform	Chen Aisen and Lin Yue (CHN)	David Boudia and Steele Johnson (USA)	Tom Daley and Daniel Goodfellow (GBR)

=== Women ===
Event	Gold	Silver	Bronze
3 m springboard	Shi Tingmao; China	He Zi; China	Tania Cagnotto; Italy
10 m platform	Ren Qian; China	Si Yajie; China	Meaghan Benfeito; Canada
Synchronized 3 m springboard	Shi Tingmao and Wu Minxia (CHN)	Tania Cagnotto and Francesca Dallapé (ITA)	Maddison Keeney and Anabelle Smith (AUS)
Synchronized 10 m platform	Chen Ruolin and Liu Huixia (CHN)	Cheong Jun Hoong and Pandelela Rinong (MAS)	Meaghan Benfeito and Roseline Filion (CAN)
