= Alejandra Orozco =

Mexican diver (born 1997)

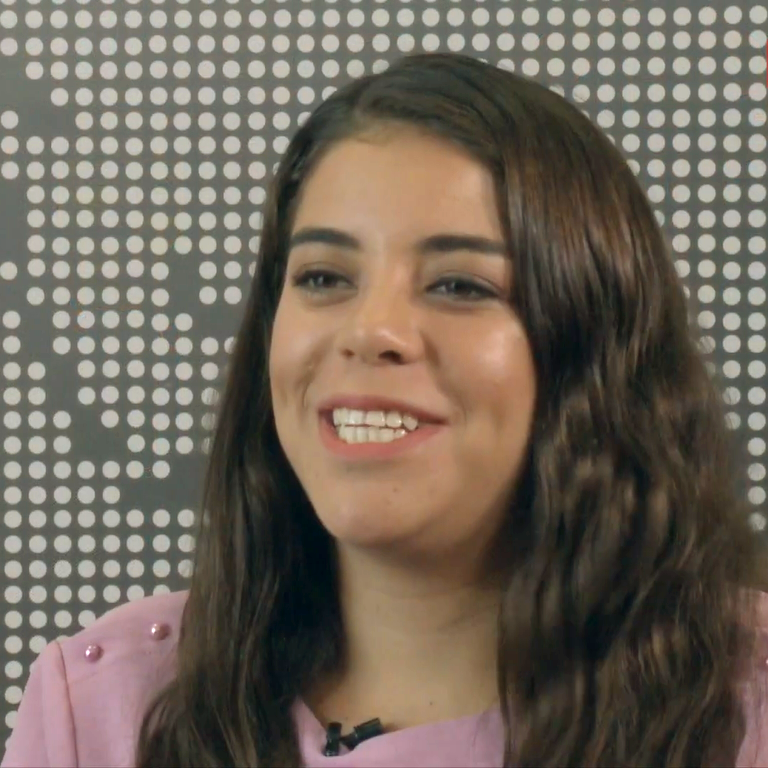
- Orozco in 2019

Personal information
- Full name: Alejandra Orozco Loza
- Born: 19 April 1997 (age 29) Zapopan, Mexico
- Height: 1.56 m (5 ft 1 in)

Sport
- Country: Mexico
Medal record
Women's diving
Representing Mexico
Olympic Games
Silver medal – second place	2012 London	10 m synchro
Bronze medal – third place	2020 Tokyo	10 m synchro
Youth Olympic Games
Gold medal – first place	2014 Nanjing	Mixed team
Bronze medal – third place	2014 Nanjing	10 m platform
Pan American Games
Gold medal – first place	2023 Santiago	10 m synchro
Silver medal – second place	2019 Lima	10 m synchro
Silver medal – second place	2023 Santiago	10 m platform
Bronze medal – third place	2015 Toronto	10 m synchro
Bronze medal – third place	2019 Lima	10 m platform

Alejandra Orozco Loza (born 19 April 1997) is a Mexican diver. In 2012, she participated in the 2012 Summer Olympics in the synchronized 10 metre platform event alongside world champion Paola Espinosa, winning a silver medal. At the age of 15, she became the youngest athlete to represent Mexico at the 2012 Olympic games.

In 2021 she participated in the 2020 Summer Olympics in the synchronized 10 metre platform event alongside Gabriela Agúndez, winning a bronze medal.

On June 6, 2024, the Mexican Olympic Committee, named to her and the olympic diver Emiliano Hernández as the flag bearers to the Olympic Games París 2024.

Olympic Games
Preceded by Donovan Carrillo and Sarah Schleper	Flagbearer for Mexico (with Emiliano Hernández); París 2024	Succeeded by Incumbent
