= Meaghan Benfeito =

Canadian diver (born 1989)

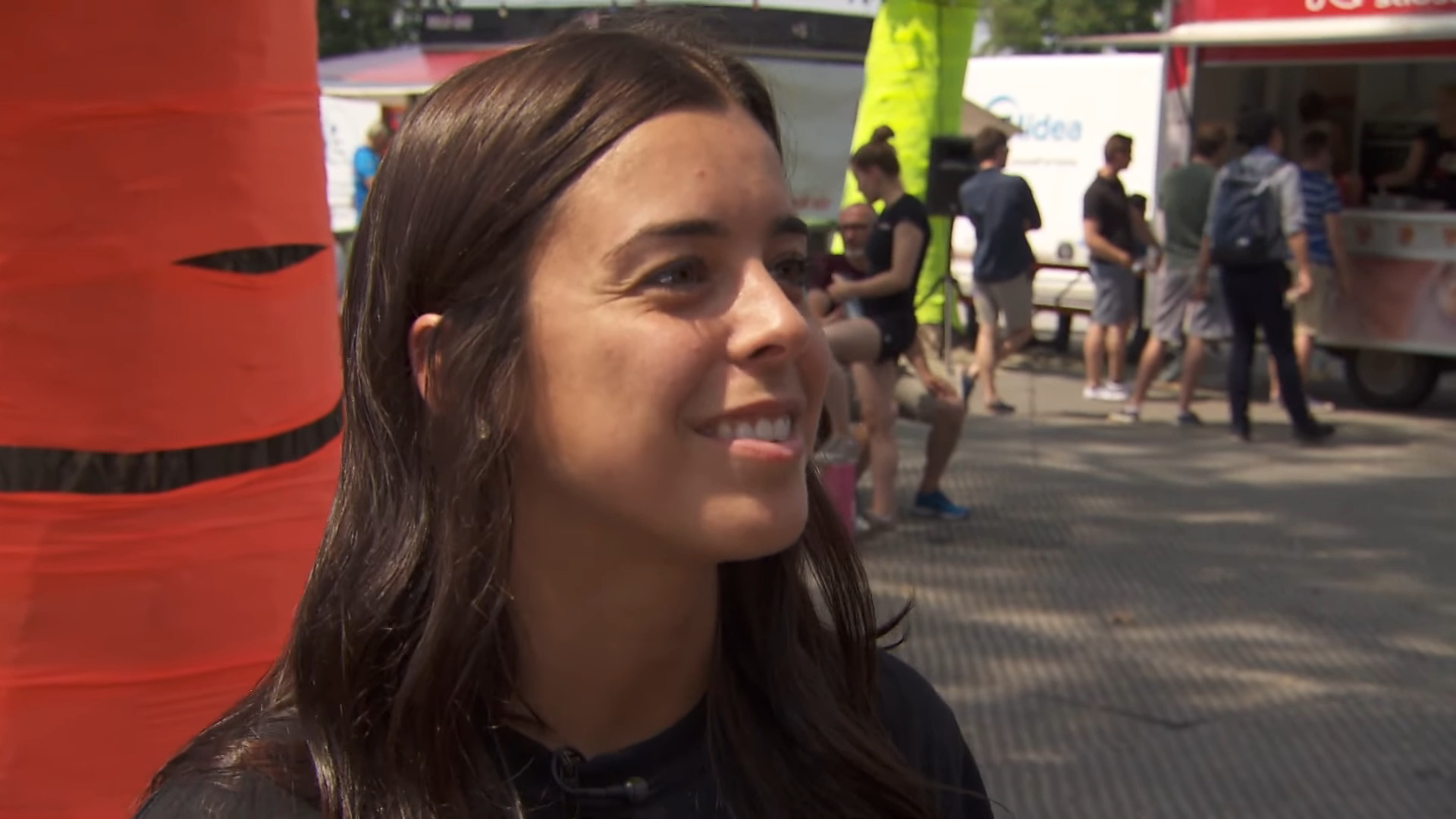

Personal information
- Full name: Meaghan Benfeito
- Born: March 2, 1989 (age 37) Montreal, Quebec
- Height: 1.55 m (5 ft 1 in)
- Weight: 48 kg (106 lb; 7 st 8 lb)

Sport
- Country: Canada
- Event(s): 10 metres & 10 metres synchro
- Club: Pointe-Claire Diving Club
- Partner: Roseline Filion
Medal record
Olympic Games
Bronze medal – third place	2012 London	10 m synchro
Bronze medal – third place	2016 Rio de Janeiro	10 m synchro
Bronze medal – third place	2016 Rio de Janeiro	10 m platform
World Championships
Silver medal – second place	2013 Barcelona	10 m synchro
Silver medal – second place	2015 Kazan	10 m synchro
Silver medal – second place	2015 Kazan	Mixed 10 m synchro
Bronze medal – third place	2005 Montréal	10 m synchro
Commonwealth Games
Gold medal – first place	2014 Glasgow	10 m platform
Gold medal – first place	2014 Glasgow	10 m synchro
Silver medal – second place	2018 Gold Coast	10 m platform
Silver medal – second place	2018 Gold Coast	10 m synchro
Bronze medal – third place	2006 Melbourne	10 m synchro
Pan American Games
Gold medal – first place	2015 Toronto	10 m synchro
Gold medal – first place	2019 Lima	10 m platform
Gold medal – first place	2019 Lima	10 m synchro
Silver medal – second place	2011 Guadalajara	10 m synchro
Bronze medal – third place	2007 Rio de Janeiro	3 m synchro
Bronze medal – third place	2011 Guadalajara	10 m platform
Bronze medal – third place	2015 Toronto	10 m platform

Meaghan Benfeito (born March 2, 1989) is a Canadian diver. She used to compete in the 10m synchronized event with Roseline Filion before the latter retired in January 2017. Benfeito and Filion won bronze medals in the 10 m platform synchro event at the 2012 and 2016 Summer Olympics, and in the latter event Benfeito also won a bronze medal in the 10 m platform individual event.

== Early life ==
Benfeito was born on March 2, 1989, in Montreal, Quebec to Portuguese parents, Arthur Benfeito and Margarida Correia. She has younger twin sisters, Alicia and Chelsea.

== Career ==
She began diving for Canada in 2005 and credits Emilie Heymans and Alexandre Despatie for inspiring her to take up the sport. She won a bronze medal at the 2005 World Aquatics Championships in her hometown of Montreal, but she and Filion have been unable to return to the medal podium at the Worlds since. In 2006, they won a bronze at the Commonwealth Games. Benfeito won a bronze medal at the 2007 Pan American Games in the 3m Synchronized event with Kelly MacDonald.

Benfeito and Filion qualified for the Beijing Olympics after they beat teammates Heymans and Marie-Eve Marleau which was considered a dramatic upset, particularly at defeating Canadian diving legend Heymans. At the 2008 Summer Olympics, the diving partners finished in 7th place. She did not compete in the 2010 Commonwealth Games due to a lingering shoulder injury that had not healed in time.

Both the ladies failed to medal at any events leading into the 2012 Summer Olympics in London. At the 2012 edition the two Canadians managed to hold third place through nearly the whole competition in the 10 m platform synchro event. After the medal clinching dive she said that "We gave it all we had and we came away with a bronze medal. We're pretty happy with that." A Quebec politician from a provincially sovereigntist party, the Parti Québécois, commented on the medals won by Benfeito and others as the first four medals won were from Quebec athletes. Pauline Marois said that ""This means, among other things, that it’s another example of how Quebec could shine among the brightest ... as an independent country. We could continue to win our medals, I’m sure of that." Benfeito responded to a similar question from Canadian media when asked if she was as proud of the day as all the day's medalists were from Quebec athletes by saying that "No, we are one big happy gang. We are equally as proud of our home in Quebec as we are of our home in Canada."

At the 2014 Commonwealth Games, she won a gold medal in the 10 m platform synchronised with Fillion, and gold in the 10 m platform individual.

At the 2016 Summer Olympics in Rio de Janeiro, Benfeito and Filion repeated their bronze medal performance in the 10 m platform synchro event, while Benfeito won an additional individual medal in the individual platform diving event. Fillion placed sixth in the latter event.

Benfeito was named as Canada's flag bearer for the 2018 Commonwealth Games in the Gold Coast, Australia.

She has qualified to represent Canada at the 2020 Summer Olympics. After successfully completing the preliminaries of the 10 metre tower, she finished 13th in the semi-finals and did not advance to the final. She announced her last Olympics were Tokyo and plans to retired from diving.

In April 2022, she announced her retirement from diving.

== Personal life ==
Benfeito and Filion have been together as diving partners for a long time and reportedly consider each other as lifelong friends. Filion said of their relationship that, "We've known one another for our entire lives, so we have a really good relationship. It's more of a sisterhood relationship now. We could probably go to a restaurant and order for each other."

Benfeito managed to escape unharmed when her Montreal condo building was destroyed by fire on January 28, 2021, however her original Olympic medals were lost. Upon the COC's request the IOC issued reproduction Olympic medals and certificates, based upon medals housed in the Olympic Museum in Lausanne, and the replicas were presented to Benfeito on June 8, 2021.
