= Korschenbroich station =

Railway station in Korschenbroich, Germany

Korschenbroich
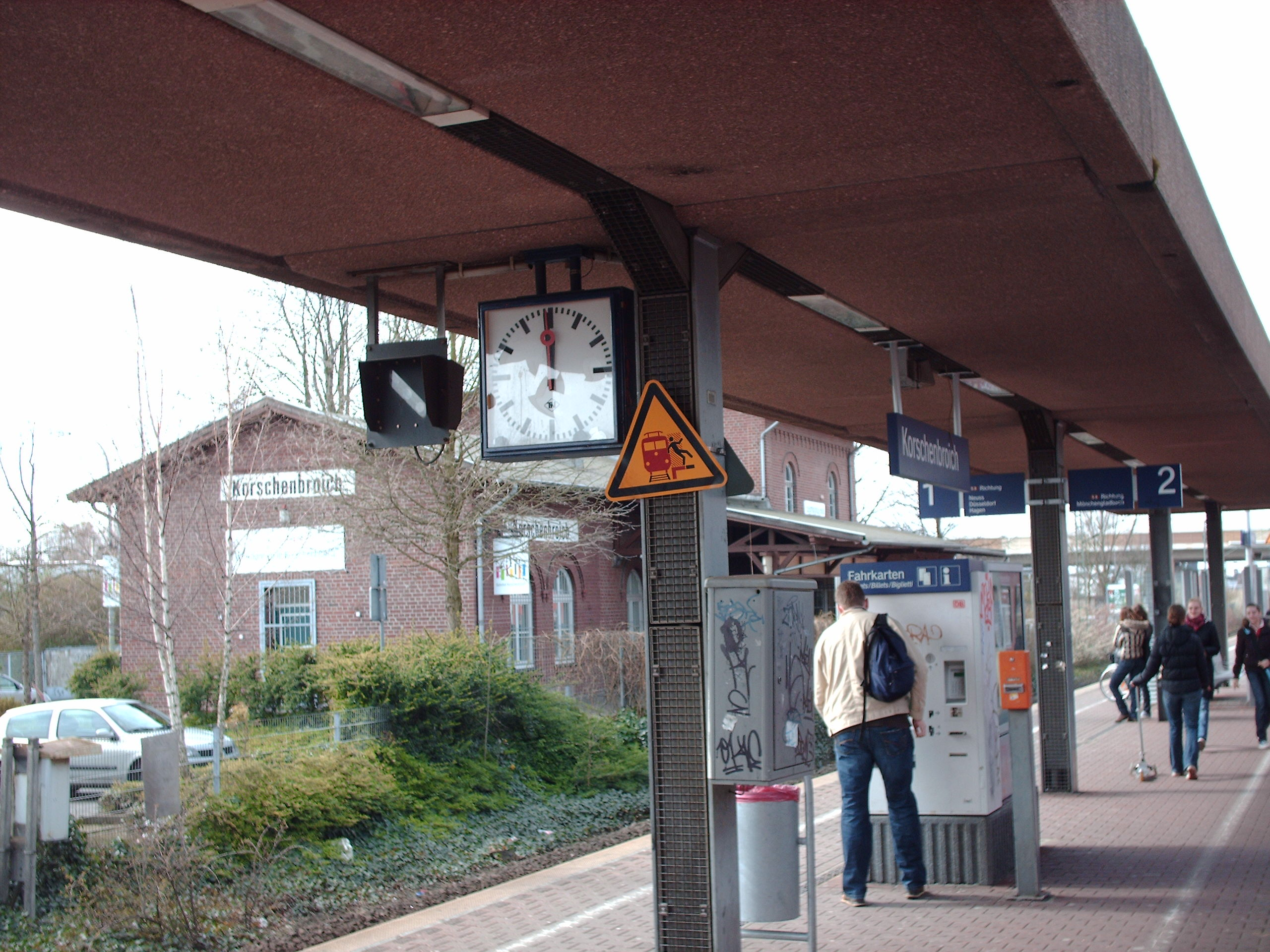

General information
- Location: Am Bahnhof 1, Korschenbroich, NRW; Germany
- Coordinates: 51°11′43″N 6°30′42″E
- Lines: Mönchengladbach–Düsseldorf (KBS 450.8)
- Platforms: 2

Construction
- Accessible: Yes

Other information
- Station code: 3380
- DS100 code: KKOI
- IBNR: 8003412
- Category: 6
- Fare zone: VRR: 510; VRS: 1510 (VRR transitional zone)
- Website: www.bahnhof.de

History
- Opened: 1868/80

Services
Preceding station	Rhine-Ruhr S-Bahn	Following station
Mönchengladbach-Lürrip towards Mönchengladbach Hbf	S8	Kleinenbroich towards Hagen Hbf
Location
- Location within North Rhine-Westphalia

Korschenbroich station is a through station in the town of Korschenbroich in the German state of North Rhine-Westphalia. The station was opened between 1868 and 1880 on the Mönchengladbach–Düsseldorf railway opened between Mönchengladbach and Neuss by the Aachen-Düsseldorf-Ruhrort Railway Company on 16 December 1852. It has two platform tracks and it is classified by Deutsche Bahn as a category 6 station.

The station is served by Rhine-Ruhr S-Bahn lines S 8 between Mönchengladbach and Wuppertal-Oberbarmen or Hagen every 20 minutes.

It is also served by two bus routes operated by Niederrheinische Versorgung und Verkehr: 016 (at 20/40 minute intervals) and 029 (60).
