= Kleinenbroich station =

Railway station in Korschenbroich, Germany

Kleinenbroich
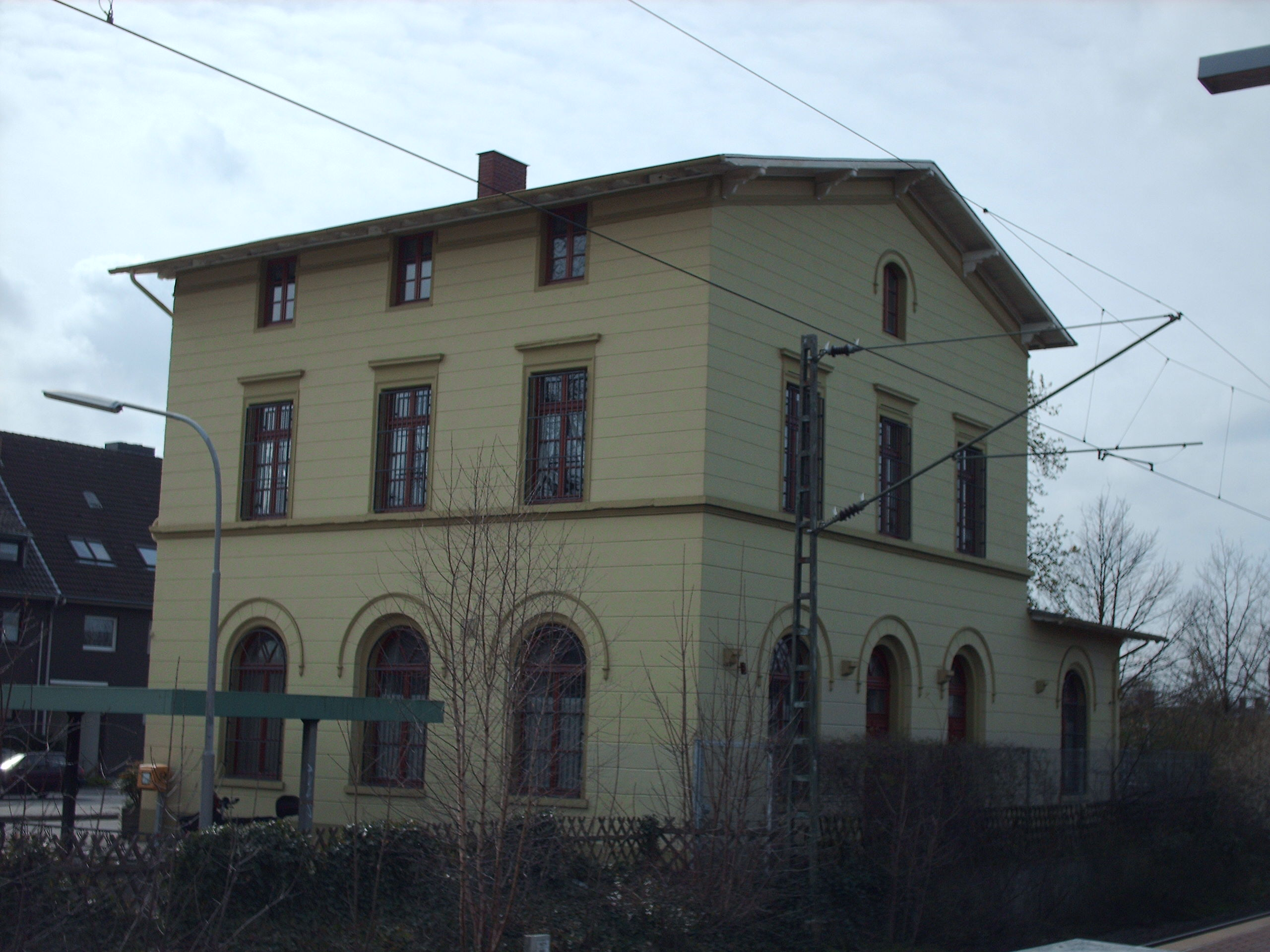

General information
- Location: Ladestraße 2, Korschenbroich, NRW; Germany
- Coordinates: 51°11′43″N 6°32′59″E
- Line: Mönchengladbach–Düsseldorf
- Platforms: 2

Construction
- Accessible: Yes

Other information
- Station code: 3247
- DS100 code: KKLE
- IBNR: 8003321
- Category: 6
- Fare zone: VRR: 512; VRS: 1510 (VRR transitional zone)
- Website: www.bahnhof.de

History
- Opened: 17 January 1853

Services
Preceding station	Rhine-Ruhr S-Bahn	Following station
Korschenbroich towards Mönchengladbach Hbf	S8	Büttgen towards Hagen Hbf
Location
- Location within North Rhine-Westphalia

Kleinenbroich station is a through station in the town of Korschenbroich in the German state of North Rhine-Westphalia. The station was opened on 17 January 1853 on the Mönchengladbach–Düsseldorf railway opened between Mönchengladbach and Neuss by the Aachen-Düsseldorf-Ruhrort Railway Company on 16 December 1852. It has two platform tracks and it is classified by Deutsche Bahn as a category 5 station.

The station is served by Rhine-Ruhr S-Bahn lines S 8 between Mönchengladbach and Wuppertal-Oberbarmen or Hagen every 20 minutes.
