= Büttgen station =

Railway station in Kaarst, Germany

Büttgen
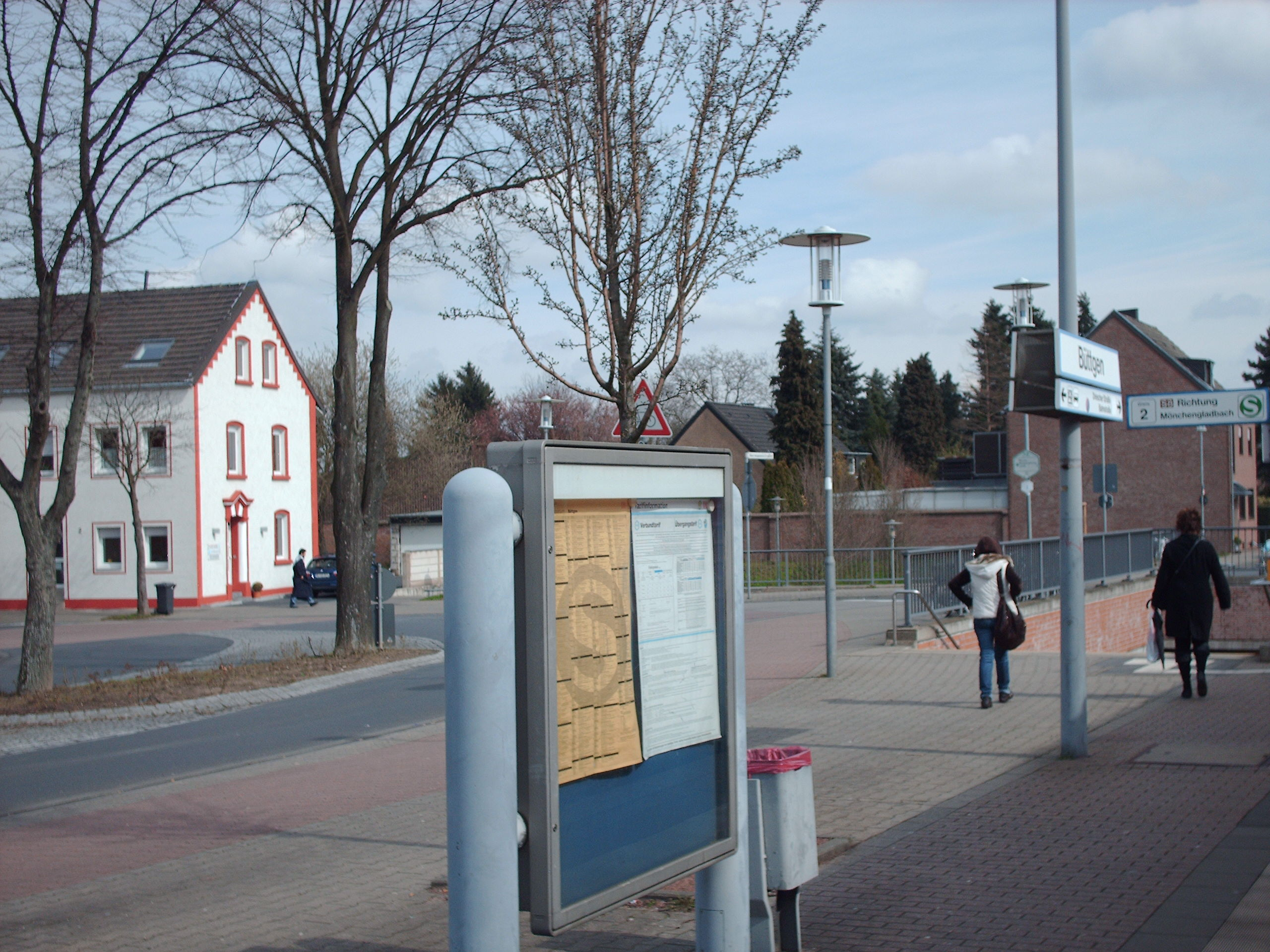

General information
- Location: Driescher Birkhofstraße 1 Kaarst, Rhein-Kreis Neuss, NRW; Germany
- Coordinates: 51°11′49″N 6°36′18″E
- Lines: Mönchengladbach–Düsseldorf railway (KBS 450.8)

Construction
- Accessible: Yes

Other information
- Station code: 1011
- DS100 code: KBUT
- IBNR: 8001261
- Category: 5
- Fare zone: VRR: 526; VRS: 1520 (VRR transitional zone)
- Website: www.bahnhof.de

History
- Opened: 8 January 1868

Services
Preceding station	Rhine-Ruhr S-Bahn	Following station
Kleinenbroich towards Mönchengladbach Hbf	S8	Neuss Hbf towards Hagen Hbf
Location
- Location within North Rhine-Westphalia

Büttgen station is a railway station in the town of Büttgen, a part of Kaarst in North Rhine-Westphalia, Germany. The station was opened on 8 January 1868. It lies on the Mönchengladbach–Düsseldorf railway line, one of the oldest in Germany that was originally constructed by the Aachen-Düsseldorf-Ruhrort Railway Company. Büttgen station has two tracks and two platforms and is classified by Deutsche Bahn as a category 5 station.

The station is served by the S 8 line of the Rhine-Ruhr S-Bahn network, running between Mönchengladbach and Wuppertal-Oberbarmen or Hagen every 20 minutes at weekday core times.
