= Diving at the 2025 Summer World University Games – Men's synchronized 10 metre platform =

Men's synchronized 10 metre platform at the 2025 Summer World University Games
- Venue: Schwimm- und Sprunghalle im Europasportpark
- Location: Berlin
- Dates: 20 July
- Competitors: 14 from 7 nations

Medalists
gold medal	Mo Yonghua; Zheng Junzhi	China
silver medal	Luis Avila Sanchez; Jaden Eikermann	Germany
bronze medal	Kim Ji-wook; Kim Yeong-taek	South Korea

The men's synchronized 10 metre platform at the 2025 Summer World University Games in Rhine-Ruhr, Germany was held 20 July 2025. The gold medal was won by Mo Yonghua/Zheng Junzhi (China), the silver medal by Luis Avila Sanchez/Jaden Eikermann (Germany) and the bronze medal by Kim Ji-wook/Kim Yeong-taek (South Korea).

== Schedule ==
All times are Central European Time (UTC+1)

Date	Time	Round
20 July 2025	14:25	Final

== Results ==
14 divers entered the event, representing 7 nations.

Rank	Name	Nation	Final						
Rank	Name	Nation	Dive 1	Dive 2	Dive 3	Dive 4	Dive 5	Dive 6	Total
1	Zheng Junzhi; Mo Yonghua	China	52.80	47.40	75.84	89.76	81.60	89.91	437.31
2	Jaden Eikermann; Luis Avila Sanchez	Germany	48.00	47.40	72.00	74.88	68.82	89.64	400.74
3	Kim Yeong-taek; Kim Ji-wook	South Korea	45.60	45.60	73.80	73.92	65.28	73.44	377.64
4	Maxwell Weinrich; Dashiell Glasberg	United States	49.80	48.00	77.40	62.40	65.52	73.92	377.04
5	Danylo Avanesov; Marko Barsukov	Ukraine	51.60	48.60	70.08	66.24	68.31	72.00	376.83
6	Koga Niwa; Shuta Yamada	Japan	50.40	48.00	59.16	75.84	64.32	63.90	361.62
7	Julian Verzotto; Francesco Casalini	Italy	49.80	45.60	64.32	70.20	55.44	67.20	352.56
