= Mönchengladbach-Lürrip station =

Railway station in Germany

Mönchengladbach Lürrip
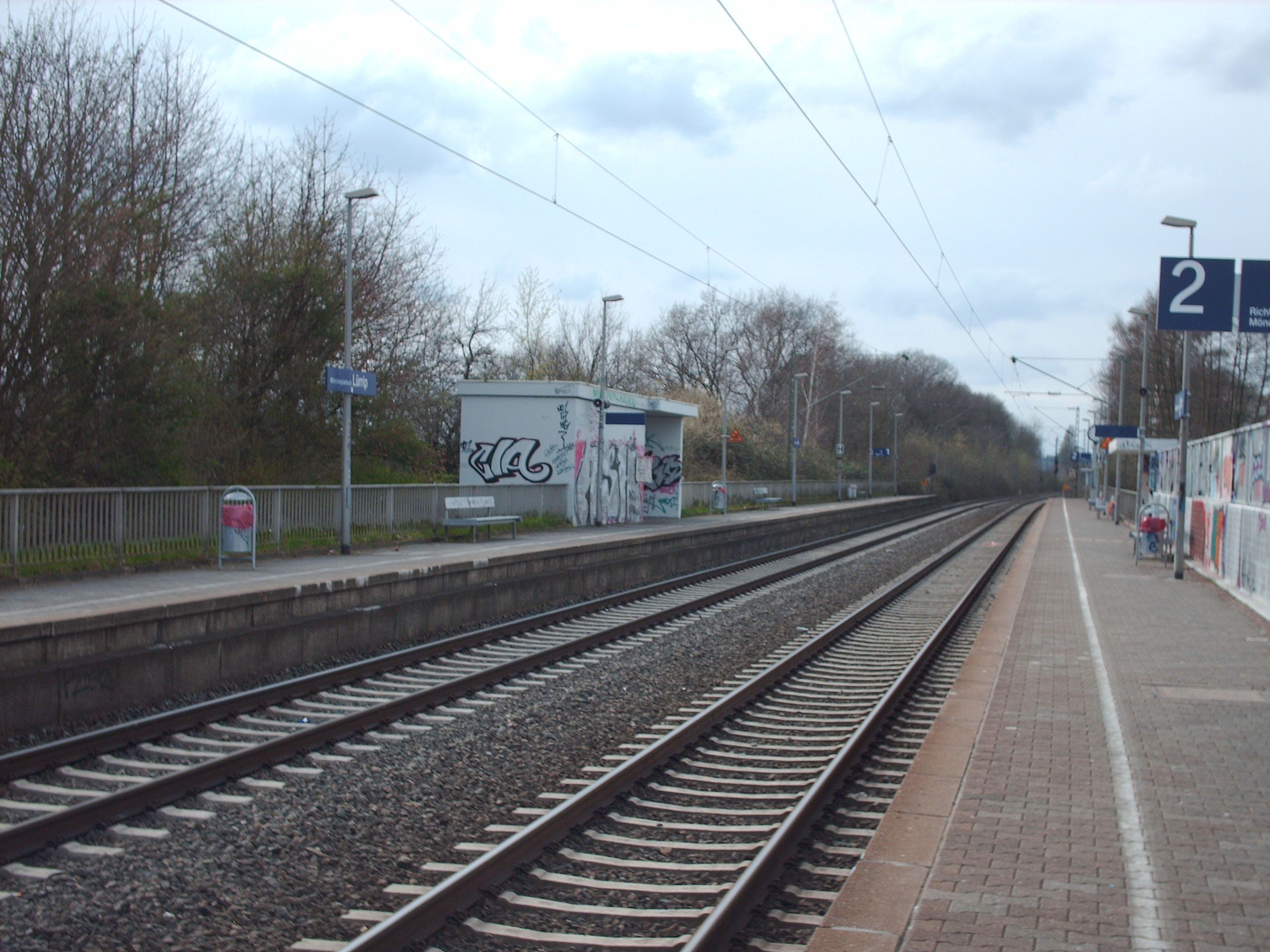

General information
- Location: Volksbadstr. 63, Mönchengladbach, NRW; Germany
- Coordinates: 51°11′59″N 6°28′20″E
- Lines: Mönchengladbach–Düsseldorf (KBS 450.8)
- Platforms: 2

Construction
- Accessible: No

Other information
- Station code: 4163
- DS100 code: KML
- IBNR: 8001745
- Category: 6
- Fare zone: VRR: 500; VRS: 1500 (VRR transitional zone)
- Website: www.bahnhof.de

History
- Opened: 1980/81

Services
Preceding station	Rhine-Ruhr S-Bahn	Following station
Mönchengladbach Hbf Terminus	S8	Korschenbroich towards Hagen Hbf
Location
- Location within North Rhine-Westphalia

Mönchengladbach-Lürrip station is a through station in the town of Mönchengladbach in the German state of North Rhine-Westphalia. The station was opened in 1980 or 1981 on the Mönchengladbach–Düsseldorf railway opened between Mönchengladbach and Neuss by the Aachen-Düsseldorf-Ruhrort Railway Company on 16 December 1852. It has two platform tracks and it is classified by Deutsche Bahn as a category 6 station.

The station is served by Rhine-Ruhr S-Bahn lines S 8 between Mönchengladbach and Wuppertal-Oberbarmen or Hagen every 20 minutes.
