= Diving at the 2025 Summer World University Games – Mixed synchronized 10 metre platform =

Mixed synchronized 10 metre platform at the 2025 Summer World University Games
- Venue: Schwimm- und Sprunghalle im Europasportpark
- Location: Berlin
- Dates: 23 July
- Competitors: 8 from 4 nations

Medalists
gold medal	Zheng Junzhi; Wang Weiying	China
silver medal	Kaden Springfield; Sophia McAfee	United States
bronze medal	Kim Yeong-taek; Kim Na-hyun	South Korea

The mixed synchronized 10 metre platform at the 2025 Summer World University Games in Rhine-Ruhr, Germany was held 23 July 2025. The gold medal was won by Zheng Junzhi/Wang Weiying (China), the silver medal by Kaden Springfield/Sophia McAfee (United States) and the bronze medal by Kim Yeong-taek/Kim Na-hyun (South Korea).

== Schedule ==
All times are Central European Time (UTC+1)

Date	Time	Round
23 July 2025	15:20	Final

== Results ==
8 divers entered the event, representing 4 nations.

Rank	Name	Nation	Final					
Rank	Name	Nation	Dive 1	Dive 2	Dive 3	Dive 4	Dive 5	Total
1st place, gold medalist(s)	Zheng Junzhi; Wang Weiying	China	52.80	50.40	72.96	85.14	80.64	341.94
2nd place, silver medalist(s)	Sophia McAfee; Kaden Springfield	United States	45.60	43.80	68.40	59.64	73.92	291.36
3rd place, bronze medalist(s)	Kim Na-hyun; Kim Yeong-taek	South Korea	45.60	46.80	54.90	57.12	62.40	266.82
4	Shuta Yamada; Karen Yamasaki	Japan	39.60	44.40	50.88	52.20	46.11	233.19
