= Diving at the 2025 Summer World University Games – Men's 10 metre platform =

Men's 10 metre platform at the 2025 Summer World University Games
- Venue: Schwimm- und Sprunghalle im Europasportpark
- Location: Berlin
- Dates: 18 July (preliminary); 19 July (final)
- Competitors: 18 from 8 nations

Medalists
| gold medal | Zheng Junzhi | China |
| silver medal | Mo Yonghua | China |
| bronze medal | Kim Yeong-taek | South Korea |

The men's 10 metre platform at the 2025 Summer World University Games in Rhine-Ruhr, Germany was held from 18 to 19 July 2025. The gold medal was won by Zheng Junzhi (China), the silver medal by Mo Yonghua (China) and the bronze medal by Kim Yeong-taek (South Korea).

== Schedule ==
All times are Central European Time (UTC+1)

| Date | Time | Round |
|---|---|---|
| 18 July 2025 | 12:05 | Preliminary |
| 19 July 2025 | 15:40 | Final |

== Results ==
18 divers entered the event, representing 8 nations. A maximum of two players per nation advanced to the final.

| Rank | Name | Nation | Preliminary | | Final | | | | | | |
| Rank | Name | Nation | Score | Rank | Dive 1 | Dive 2 | Dive 3 | Dive 4 | Dive 5 | Dive 6 | Total |
|---|---|---|---|---|---|---|---|---|---|---|---|
| 1st place, gold medalist(s) | Zheng Junzhi | China | 405.50 | 1 | 86.40 | 73.60 | 52.70 | 90.75 | 68.45 | 83.20 | 455.10 |
| 2nd place, silver medalist(s) | Mo Yonghua | China | 393.10 | 2 | 76.80 | 68.25 | 76.80 | 88.40 | 77.40 | 61.05 | 448.70 |
| 3rd place, bronze medalist(s) | Kim Yeong-taek | South Korea | 390.70 | 3 | 75.00 | 73.60 | 86.40 | 59.50 | 69.70 | 70.20 | 434.40 |
| 4 | Danylo Avanesov | Ukraine | 379.80 | 4 | 67.20 | 72.00 | 54.45 | 70.20 | 72.00 | 63.00 | 398.85 |
| 5 | Francesco Casalini | Italy | 340.00 | 9 | 63.00 | 76.80 | 61.05 | 46.20 | 72.80 | 64.00 | 383.85 |
| 6 | Marko Barsukov | Ukraine | 375.70 | 5 | 67.50 | 52.80 | 43.40 | 69.30 | 56.00 | 77.40 | 366.40 |
| 7 | Maxwell Weinrich | United States | 347.30 | 8 | 76.50 | 80.00 | 29.45 | 72.80 | 33.00 | 68.80 | 360.55 |
| 8 | Julian Verzotto | Italy | 336.35 | 11 | 62.40 | 64.50 | 72.00 | 49.00 | 57.75 | 52.80 | 358.45 |
| 9 | Andrew Bennett | United States | 353.35 | 7 | 66.00 | 51.20 | 54.40 | 45.90 | 59.40 | 72.00 | 348.90 |
| 10 | Kim Ji-wook | South Korea | 338.65 | 10 | 63.55 | 58.50 | 67.20 | 46.20 | 44.20 | 61.20 | 340.85 |
| 11 | Espen Prenzyna | Germany | 372.60 | 6 | 38.40 | 46.40 | 66.00 | 67.20 | 64.35 | 51.00 | 333.35 |
| 12 | Shuta Yamada | Japan | 328.60 | 13 | 39.60 | 57.80 | 36.80 | 40.50 | 30.60 | 27.00 | 232.30 |
| 13 | Kaden Springfield | United States | 336.00 | 12 | Did not advance | | | | | | |
| 14 | Tom Waldsteiner | Germany | 322.40 | 14 | Did not advance | | | | | | |
| 15 | Choi Gan-gin | South Korea | 319.00 | 15 | Did not advance | | | | | | |
| 16 | Reo Sakata | Japan | 318.80 | 16 | Did not advance | | | | | | |
| 17 | Koga Niwa | Japan | 311.85 | 17 | Did not advance | | | | | | |
| 18 | Felipe Margiotto | Brazil | 271.85 | 18 | Did not advance | | | | | | |
