= Diving at the 2025 Summer World University Games – Mixed team =

Mixed team at the 2025 Summer World University Games
- Venue: Schwimm- und Sprunghalle im Europasportpark
- Location: Berlin
- Dates: 19 July
- Competitors: 24 from 6 nations

Medalists
gold medal	Jette Müller; Moritz Wesemann; Pauline Pfeif; Jaden Eikermann	Germany
silver medal	Qu Zhixin; Mo Zhengxiong; He Yanwei; Mo Yonghua	China
bronze medal	Oh Soo-yeon; Kim Ji-wook; Kim Na-hyun; Kim Yeong-taek	South Korea

The mixed team at the 2025 Summer World University Games in Rhine-Ruhr, Germany was held 19 July 2025. The gold medal was won by Germany, the silver medal by China and the bronze medal by South Korea.

== Schedule ==
All times are Central European Time (UTC+1)

Date	Time	Round
19 July 2025	13:50	Final

== Results ==
24 divers entered the event, representing 6 nations.

Rank	Name	Nation	Final						
Rank	Name	Nation	Dive 1	Dive 2	Dive 3	Dive 4	Dive 5	Dive 6	Total
1st place, gold medalist(s)	Jette Müller; Moritz Wesemann; Pauline Pfeif; Jaden Eikermann	Germany	67.50	89.30	67.50	67.20	72.00	73.60	437.10
2nd place, silver medalist(s)	Qu Zhixin; Mo Zhengxiong; He Yanwei; Mo Yonghua	China	78.00	71.30	64.50	67.20	66.50	81.60	429.10
3rd place, bronze medalist(s)	Oh Soo-yeon; Kim Ji-wook; Kim Na-hyun; Kim Yeong-taek	South Korea	57.00	73.50	60.00	69.60	87.50	52.50	400.10
4	Lanie Gutch; Luke Sitz; Sophia McAfee; Andrew Bennett	United States	56.70	84.00	57.35	59.45	64.00	72.00	393.50
5	Rebeca Nascimento; Joao Margiotto; Heloá Camelo	Brazil	42.00	49.50	63.00	41.85	52.65	52.20	301.20
6	Shuta Yamada; Koga Niwa; Hana Kondo; Karen Yamasaki	Japan	40.50	70.90	40.50	47.85	50.40	54.40	264.05
