= Diving at the 2025 Summer World University Games – Men's synchronized 3 metre springboard =

Men's synchronized 3 metre springboard at the 2025 Summer World University Games
- Venue: Schwimm- und Sprunghalle im Europasportpark
- Location: Berlin
- Dates: 23 July
- Competitors: 12 from 6 nations

Medalists
| gold medal | Zhang Wenao; Hu Yukang | China |
| silver medal | Luke Sitz; Joshua Sollenberger | United States |
| bronze medal | Kim Ji-wook; Kim Yeong-taek | South Korea |

The men's synchronized 3 metre springboard at the 2025 Summer World University Games in Rhine-Ruhr, Germany was held 23 July 2025. The gold medal was won by Zhang Wenao/Hu Yukang (China), the silver medal by Luke Sitz/Joshua Sollenberger (United States) and the bronze medal by Kim Ji-wook/Kim Yeong-taek (South Korea).

== Schedule ==
All times are Central European Time (UTC+1)

| Date | Time | Round |
|---|---|---|
| 23 July 2025 | 13:25 | Final |

== Results ==
12 divers entered the event, representing 6 nations.

| Rank | Name | Nation | Final | | | | | |
| Rank | Name | Nation | Dive 1 | Dive 2 | Dive 3 | Dive 4 | Dive 5 | Total |
|---|---|---|---|---|---|---|---|---|
| 1st place, gold medalist(s) | Zhang Wenao; Hu Yukang | China | 50.40 | 49.20 | 74.40 | 80.58 | 71.40 | 412.62 |
| 2nd place, silver medalist(s) | Joshua Sollenberger; Luke Sitz | United States | 48.00 | 46.80 | 64.80 | 72.54 | 70.68 | 380.34 |
| 3rd place, bronze medalist(s) | Kim Ji-wook; Kim Yeong-taek | South Korea | 43.20 | 46.80 | 64.17 | 44.10 | 78.54 | 355.56 |
| 4 | Espen Prenzyna; Tim Axer | Germany | 50.40 | 44.40 | 69.30 | 58.59 | 65.70 | 354.99 |
| 5 | Kyrylo Azarov; Maksym Mirza | Ukraine | 48.00 | 42.00 | 61.20 | 66.30 | 68.25 | 341.55 |
| 6 | Reo Sakata; Koga Niwa | Japan | 38.40 | 42.00 | 62.10 | 54.06 | 63.00 | 321.87 |
