= Diving at the 2026 European Aquatics Championships – Men's 10 m platform =

Men's 10 m platform at the 2026 European Aquatics Championships
- Venue: Paris Aquatic Centre
- Dates: 6 August
- Competitors: 19 from 12 nations
- Winning points: 524.20

Medalists
gold medal	Ruslan Ternovoi
silver medal	Jaden Eikermann	Germany
bronze medal	Ole Rösler	Germany

The Men's 10 m platform competition at the 2026 European Aquatics Championships was held on 6 August 2026.

== Results ==
The preliminary round was started at 10:30. The final was started at 18:50.

Green denotes finalists

Rank	Diver	Nationality	Preliminary		Final	
Rank	Diver	Nationality	Points	Rank	Points	Rank
1st place, gold medalist(s)	Ruslan Ternovoi	Neutral Athletes B	439.35	4	524.20	1
2nd place, silver medalist(s)	Jaden Eikermann	Germany	486.50	1	513.05	2
3rd place, bronze medalist(s)	Ole Rösler	Germany	477.45	2	480.75	3
4	Romano Wang	Italy	372.15	12	455.75	4
5	Mark Hrytsenko	Ukraine	423.70	7	454.90	5
6	Oleksiy Sereda	Ukraine	429.75	5	449.90	6
7	Noah Williams	Great Britain	427.35	6	425.40	7
8	Anton Knoll	Austria	393.40	10	395.20	8
9	Simone Conte	Italy	412.75	8	393.40	9
10	Miroslav Kiselev	Neutral Athletes B	401.40	9	377.50	10
11	Kyle Kothari	Great Britain	450.60	3	366.50	11
12	Dariush Lotfi	Austria	373.90	11	352.55	12
13	Jorge Rodríguez	Spain	367.80	13	Did not advance	
14	Maciej Bujak	Poland	345.55	14	Did not advance	
15	Stavros Sifnaios	Greece	321.00	15	Did not advance	
16	Aleksa Teofilović	Serbia	318.10	16	Did not advance	
17	Erik Passerone	Switzerland	293.00	17	Did not advance	
18	Siarhei Malashonak	Neutral Athletes A	290.50	18	Did not advance	
19	Alexandr Koloskov	Neutral Athletes A	285.05	19	Did not advance	
	Tsvetomir Ereminov	Bulgaria	Did not start			
