= Ole Rösler =

German diver (born 2007)

Personal information
- Nationality: German
- Born: 17 September 2007 (age 18)

Sport
- Country: Germany
- Sport: Diving
Medal record
Men's diving
Representing Germany
European Aquatics Championships
Silver medal – second place	2026 Paris	10 m mixed synchro
Bronze medal – third place	2026 Paris	10 m platform
European Diving Championships
Silver medal – second place	2025 Antalya	10 m platform
Silver medal – second place	2025 Antalya	10 m synchro
Silver medal – second place	2025 Antalya	Mixed team

Ole Rösler (born 17 September 2007) is a German diver.

== Career ==
In May 2025, Rösler competed at the 2025 European Diving Championships and won silver medals in the 10 metre platform, 10 metre synchro, and mixed team events.

In August 2026, he competed at the 2026 European Aquatics Championships and won a silver medal in the mixed 10 metre platform synchro event, along with Pauline Pfeif.
