= Kim Yeong-taek =

South Korean diver (born 2001)

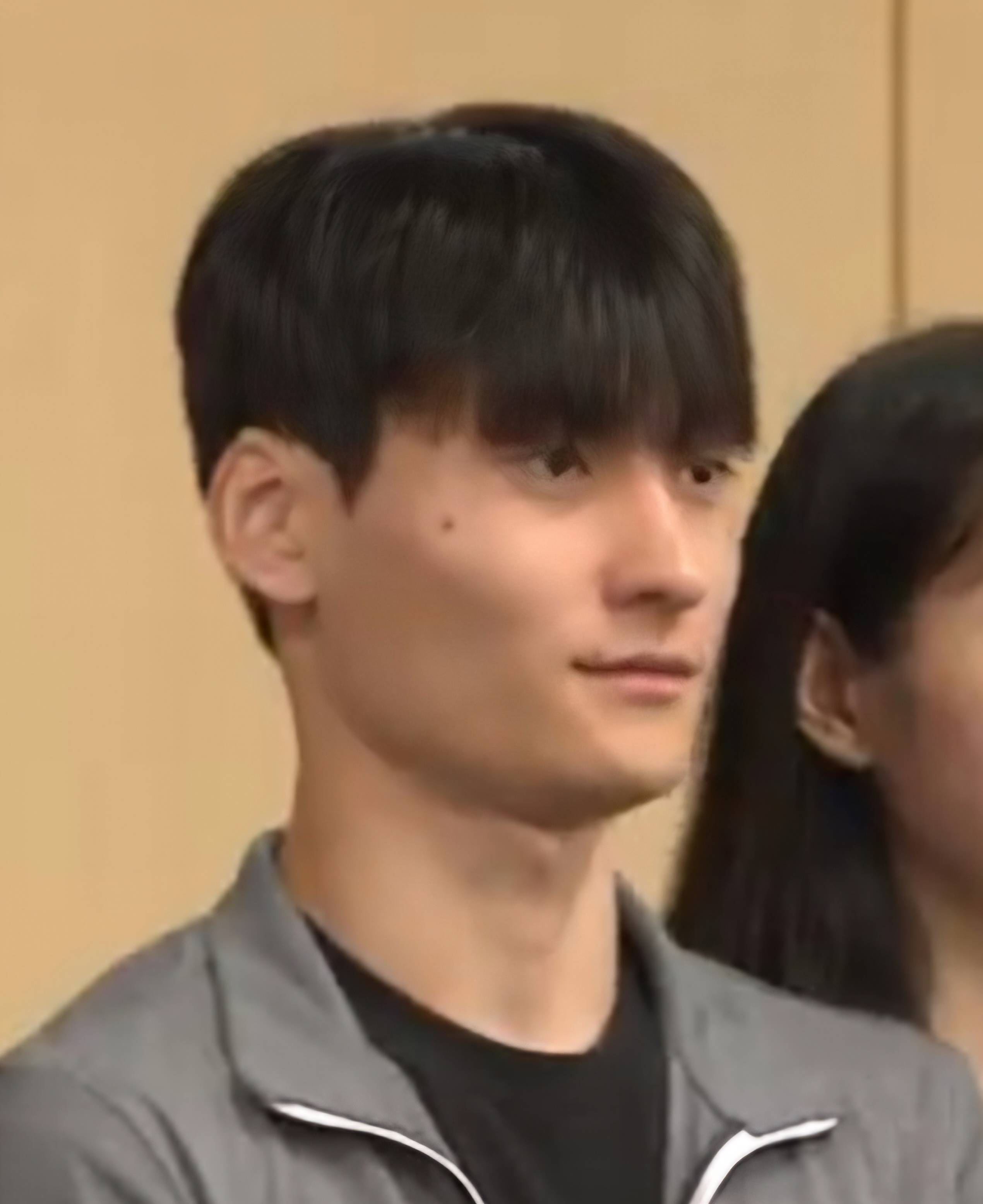

Personal information
- Native name: 김영택
- National team: South Korea
- Born: August 24, 2001 (age 25) Incheon, South Korea
- Education: Gyeonggi Physical Education High School
- Employer: Jeju Special Self-Government Provincial Office

Sport
- Country: South Korea
- Sport: Diving
- Coached by: Hong Myung-ho (national)
Medal record
Men's diving
Representing South Korea
Asian Games
Bronze medal – third place	2026 Aichi–Nagoya	10 m synchro
World University Games
Silver medal – second place	2025 Rhine-Ruhr	Team
Bronze medal – third place	2025 Rhine-Ruhr	10 m platform
Bronze medal – third place	2025 Rhine-Ruhr	3 m synchro
Bronze medal – third place	2025 Rhine-Ruhr	10 m synchro
Bronze medal – third place	2025 Rhine-Ruhr	10 m mixed synchro
Bronze medal – third place	2025 Rhine-Ruhr	Mixed team

Korean name
- Hangul: 김영택
- RR: Gim Yeongtaek
- MR: Kim Yŏngt'aek

Kim Yeong-taek (Korean: 김영택; born August 24, 2001) is a South Korean diver. He competed in the 2020 and 2024 Summer Olympics. His older brother Kim Yeong-nam is also a diver.
