= Diving at the 2024 European Aquatics Championships – Team =

Team at the 2024 European Aquatics Championships
- Venue: Serbian Institute For Sports And Sports Medicine
- Dates: 17 June
- Competitors: 23 from 6 nations
- Teams: 6
- Winning points: 367.65

Medalists
gold medal	Valeria Antolino; Carlos Camacho; Juan Pablo Cortes Zapata	Spain
silver medal	Danylo Avanesov; Stanislav Oliferchyk; Karina Hlyzhina; Anna Pysmenska	Ukraine
bronze medal	Carolina Coordes; Jana Lisa Rother; Lou Massenberg; Luis Avila Sanchez	Germany

The Team competition of the 2024 European Aquatics Championships was held on 17 June 2024.

== Results ==
The final started at 15:30.

(F) Female; (M) Male;

Rank	Nation	Divers	Points						
Rank	Nation	Divers	T1	T2	T3	T4	T5	T6	Total
1st place, gold medalist(s)	Spain	Valeria Antolino (F); Carlos Camacho (M); Juan Pablo Cortes Zapata (M)	54.60	69.75	46.50	62.40	72.00	62.40	367.65
2nd place, silver medalist(s)	Ukraine	Danylo Avanesov (M); Stanislav Oliferchyk (M); Karina Hlyzhina (F); Anna Pysmenska (F)	48.00	69.70	49.50	60.20	75.60	54.00	357.00
3rd place, bronze medalist(s)	Germany	Carolina Coordes (F); Jana Lisa Rother (F); Lou Massenberg (M); Luis Avila Sanchez (M)	57.00	71.75	57.00	38.40	72.15	56.00	352.30
4	Romania	Amelie-Enya Foerster (F); Nicoleta-Angelica Muscalu (F); Alexandru Avasiloae (M); Ioana-Andreea Carcu (F)	39.60	63.00	51.80	54.40	56.00	56.00	320.80
5	France	Gwendal Bisch (M); Nais Gillet (F); Lois Szymczak (M); Emily Hallifax (F)	55.35	49.40	58.50	62.40	44.55	49.00	319.20
6	Sweden	Amanda Lundin (F); Emilia Nilsson Garip (F); Elias Petersen (M); Richard Roop-Iliste (M)	60.45	68.00	51.00	43.40	29.70	53.20	305.75
