= Diving at the 2026 European Aquatics Championships – Mixed 10 m platform synchro =

Mixed 10 m platform synchro at the 2026 European Aquatics Championships
- Venue: Paris Aquatic Centre
- Dates: 5 August
- Competitors: 12 from 6 nations
- Teams: 6

Medalists
gold medal	Oleksiy Sereda; Kseniya Baylo	Ukraine
silver medal	Ole Rösler; Pauline Pfeif	Germany
bronze medal	Jorge Rodríguez; Ana Carvajal	Spain

The Mixed 10 m platform synchro competition at the 2026 European Aquatics Championships was held on 5 August 2026.

== Results ==
The final was started at 18:30.

Rank	Nation	Points					
Rank	Nation	D1	D2	D3	D4	D5	Total
1st place, gold medalist(s)	Ukraine; Oleksiy Sereda; Kseniya Baylo	50.40	49.80	68.40	72.96	81.60	323.16
2nd place, silver medalist(s)	Germany; Ole Rösler; Pauline Pfeif	45.60	47.40	74.88	70.20	79.68	317.76
3rd place, bronze medalist(s)	Spain; Jorge Rodríguez; Ana Carvajal	44.40	47.40	64.32	71.28	70.08	297.48
4	Neutral Athletes B Miroslav Kiselev; Aleksandra Kedrina	51.60	46.80	68.40	52.80	72.96	292.56
5	Italy; Raffaele Pelligra; Sarah Jodoin Di Maria	46.80	46.80	60.30	65.28	71.04	290.22
6	Netherlands; Lars van Hilten; Else Praasterink	45.60	42.00	65.52	65.70	48.96	267.78
