= Jaden Eikermann =

German diver (born 2005)

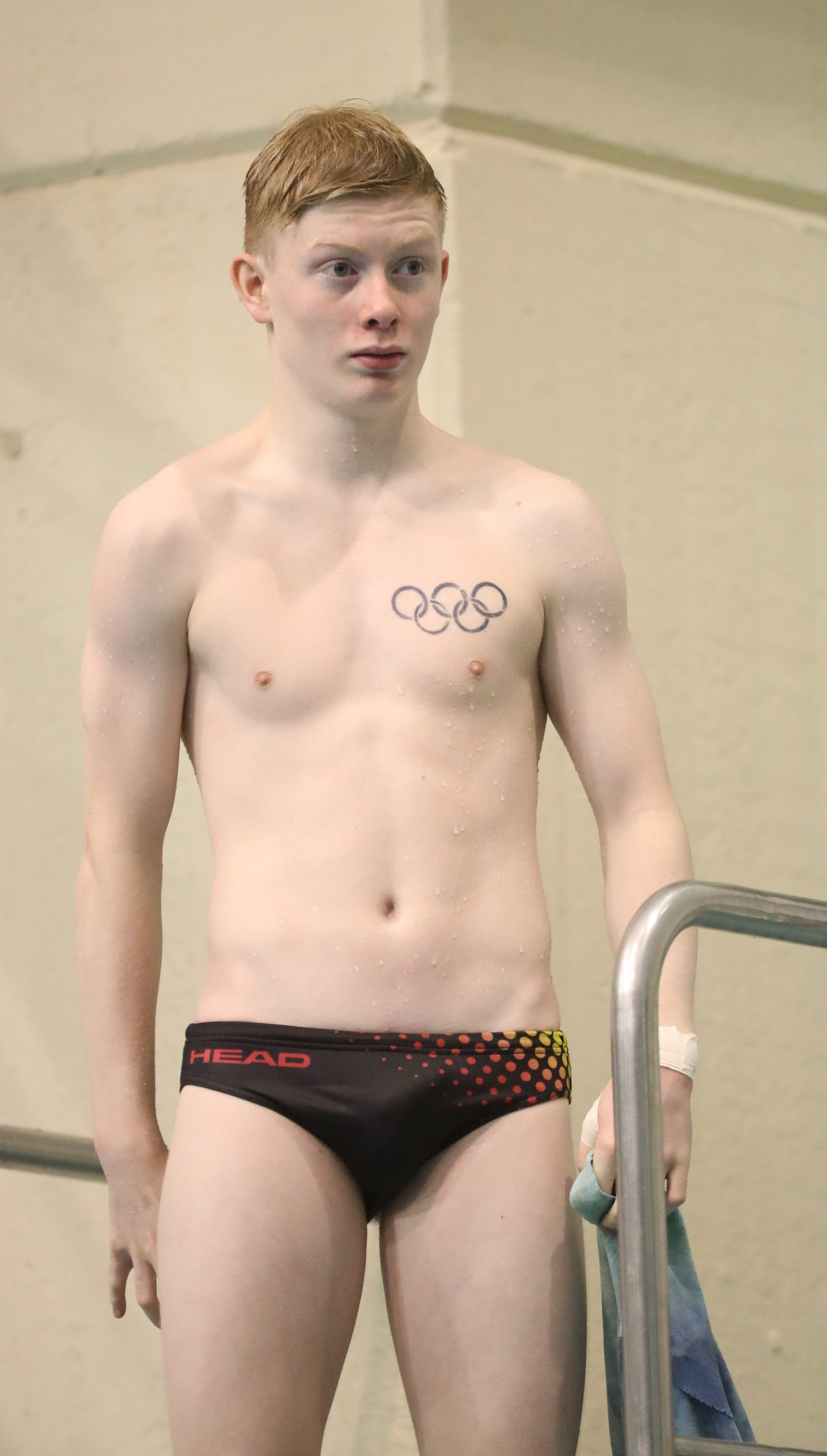
- Jaden Eikermann in 2021

Personal information
- Nationality: German
- Born: 14 February 2005 (age 21)

Sport
- Country: Germany
- Sport: Diving
Medal record
Representing Germany
European Aquatics Championships
Silver medal – second place	2026 Paris	10 m platform
Bronze medal – third place	2022 Rome	10 m synchro
World University Games
Gold medal – first place	2025 Rhine-Ruhr	Mixed team

Jaden Shiloh Eikermann Gregorchuk (born 14 February 2005) is a German diver.

He represented his country at the 2021 Summer Olympic Games in Tokyo, finishing 21st in the men's 10 metre platform event.

With partner Timo Barthel, he placed 7th in the 10 metre synchronised platform event at the 2024 Olympic Games.
