= Mönchengladbach Hauptbahnhof =

Railway station in Mönchengladbach, Germany

Mönchengladbach Hbf
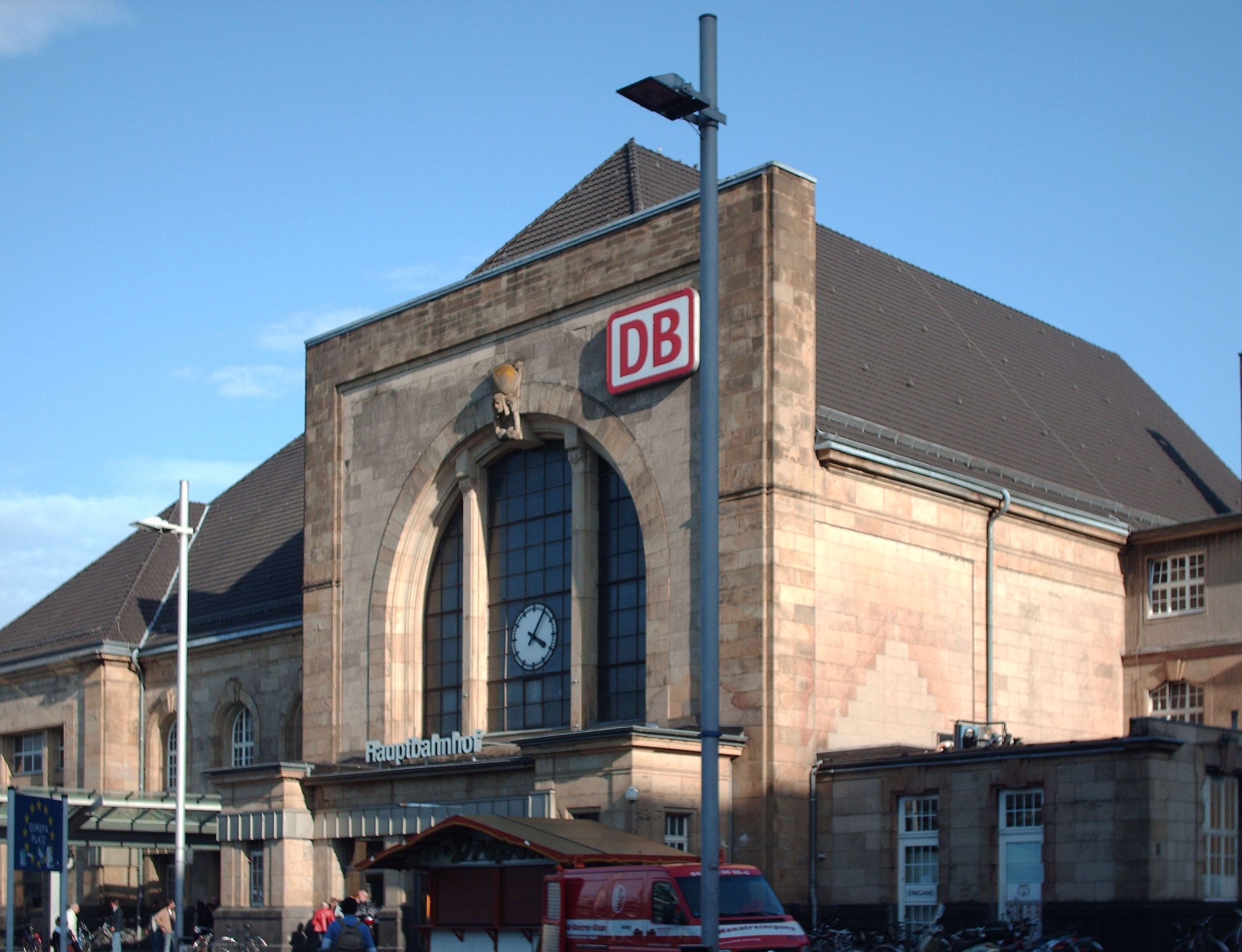
- The outside of the station building

General information
- Location: Europaplatz 1, Mönchengladbach, NRW; Germany
- Coordinates: 51°11′46″N 6°26′46″E
- Lines: Aachen–Mönchengladbach (KBS 485); DU-Ruhrort–Mönchengladbach (KBS 425); Mönchengladbach–Düsseldorf (KBS 485, 450.8); Mönchengladbach–Cologne (KBS 465)

Construction
- Accessible: Yes

Other information
- Station code: 4162
- DS100 code: KM
- IBNR: 8000253
- Category: 2
- Fare zone: VRR: 500; VRS: 1500 (VRR transitional zone)
- Website: www.bahnhof.de

History
- Opened: 15 October 1851

Services
Preceding station	DB Fernverkehr	Following station
Rheydt Hbf towards Aachen Hbf	ICE 10	Neuss Hbf One-way operation
Rheydt Hbf towards Aachen Hbf	ICE 14	Viersen towards Berlin Ostbahnhof
Preceding station	National Express Germany	Following station
Rheydt Hbf towards Aachen Hbf	RE 4 (Wupper-Express)	Neuss Hbf towards Dortmund Hbf
Preceding station	DB Regio NRW	Following station
Terminus	RE 8	Rheydt Hbf towards Koblenz Hbf
Terminus	RE 42	Viersen towards Münster Hbf
Terminus	RB 27	Rheydt Hbf towards Koblenz Hbf
Rheydt Hbf towards Aachen Hbf	RB 33	Viersen towards Essen-Steele
Rheydt Hbf towards Dalheim	RB 34	Terminus
Preceding station		Following station
Viersen towards Venlo	RE 13	Neuss Hbf towards Hamm (Westf) Hbf
Preceding station	VIAS	Following station
Terminus	RB 35	Viersen towards Gelsenkirchen Hbf
Preceding station	Rhine-Ruhr S-Bahn	Following station
Terminus	S8	Mönchengladbach-Lürrip towards Hagen Hbf
Location

Mönchengladbach Hauptbahnhof (German for Mönchengladbach main station) is a railway station in the city of Mönchengladbach in western Germany.

== Overview ==
The station is the largest railway station in the city and, along with Rheydt Hbf, one of the two Hauptbahnhof stations in Mönchengladbach. Mönchengladbach is the only city with two stations designated as a Hauptbahnhof on its soil, due to the merger between the cities of Mönchengladbach and Rheydt in the 1970s, and the subsequent reluctance of Deutsche Bundesbahn to rename Rheydt Hauptbahnhof. Mönchengladbach Hbf also is the busiest (in terms of passengers) station in Germany to lack long-distance trains.

== Railway lines calling at the station ==
The station is on the following routes:

- Aachen–Mönchengladbach (KBS 485)
- Duisburg-Ruhrort–Mönchengladbach (KBS 425)
- Mönchengladbach–Düsseldorf (KBS 485, 450.8)
- Mönchengladbach–Cologne (KBS 465)

Line	Line name	Route	Frequency
RE 4	Wupper-Express	Aachen Hbf–Mönchengladbach Hbf–Neuss Hbf–Düsseldorf Hbf–Wuppertal Hbf–Hagen Hbf–Dortmund Hbf	hourly
RE 8	Rhein-Erft-Express	Mönchengladbach Hbf–Grevenbroich–Rommerskirchen–Köln Hbf–Porz (Rhein)–Bonn-Beuel–Koblenz Stadtmitte–Koblenz Hbf	hourly
RE 13	Maas-Wupper-Express	Venlo–Viersen –Mönchengladbach Hbf–Neuss Hbf–Düsseldorf Hbf–Wuppertal Hbf–Hagen Hbf–Hamm	hourly
RE 42	Niers-Haard-Express	Osnabrück – Münster – Haltern am See – Recklinghausen – Gelsenkirchen – Essen Hbf – Mülheim (Ruhr) Hbf – Duisburg Hbf – Krefeld Hbf – Mönchengladbach Hbf	hourly
RB 27	Rhein-Erft-Bahn	Mönchengladbach Hbf–Grevenbroich–Rommerskirchen–Cologne–Köln/Bonn Flughafen–Bonn-Beuel–Koblenz-Ehrenbreitstein–Koblenz Hbf	hourly
RB 33	Rhein-Niers-Bahn	Essen – Mülheim – Duisburg – Krefeld – Viersen – Mönchengladbach – Aachen	hourly
RB 34	Schwalm-Nette-Bahn	Mönchengladbach Hbf–Rheydt Hbf–Wegberg–Dalheim	hourly
RB 35	Emscher-Niederrhein-Bahn	Gelsenkirchen – Oberhausen Hbf – Duisburg – Krefeld – Mönchengladbach Hbf	hourly
S8	S 8	Mönchengladbach Hbf–Neuss Hbf–Düsseldorf Hbf–Wuppertal Hbf–Hagen Hbf	to Wuppertal-Oberbarmen: every 20 minutes, to Hagen: every 60 minutes

== See also ==
- Rail transport in Germany
- Railway stations in Germany
