= Rhein-Kreis Neuss =

Coordinates: 51°10′N 6°40′E

- District
- Flag Coat of arms
- Country: Germany
- State: North Rhine-Westphalia
- Adm. region: Düsseldorf
- Capital: Neuss

Government
  - District admin.: Hans-Jürgen Petrauschke (CDU)

Area
  - Total: 576.46 km^{2} (222.57 sq mi)

Population (31 December 2023)
  - Total: 458,722
  - Density: 800/km^{2} (2,100/sq mi)
- Time zone: UTC+01:00 (CET)
  - Summer (DST): UTC+02:00 (CEST)
- Vehicle registration: GV, NE
- Website: http://www.kreis-neuss.de

Langen Foundation near Neuss.

Neuss is a Kreis (district) in the west of North Rhine-Westphalia, Germany. Nearby are the urban districts Mönchengladbach, Krefeld, Duisburg, Düsseldorf, Cologne, the districts Rhein-Erft-Kreis, Düren, Heinsberg and the district Viersen.

== History ==
In 1816 the districts Grevenbroich and Neuss were created when the whole area became part of Prussia. The city of Neuss left the district in 1913 to become an urban district. In 1929 the two districts were merged into the new district Grevenbroich-Neuss, which was renamed to Grevenbroich in 1946. In 1975 the urban district of Neuss lost its independent status and was merged into the Grevenbroich district, which was renamed to Kreis Neuss to represent the new administrative seat. On May 26, 2003, it changed its name, and is now officially called Rhein-Kreis Neuss.

== Geography ==
The main rivers of the district is the Rhine which forms most of the north-eastern border of the district, as well as the Erft. In the southern part of the district are big open pit Lignite (brown coal) mines.

== Coat of arms ==
The coat of arms was continued from the district Grevenbroich. The lion in the right side comes from the city of Jülich. The black cross in the left comes from the Cologne coat of arms. Both the bishops of Cologne as well as the dukes of Jülich owned land of the Neuss district.

== Towns and municipalities ==
Clickable map of towns and municipalities in the district

Towns
Municipalities
1. Neuss
2. Grevenbroich
3. Dormagen
4. Meerbusch
5. Kaarst
6. Korschenbroich
1. Jüchen
2. Rommerskirchen
