= Mönchengladbach–Düsseldorf railway =

Railway line in Germany

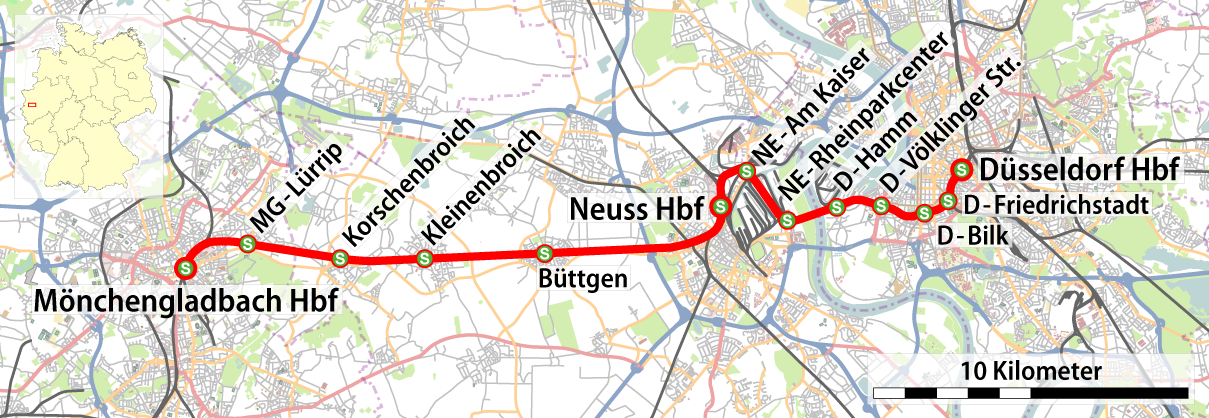

Overview
- Line number: 2550 (long distance); 2525 (S-Bahn); 2534 (former line)
- Locale: North Rhine-Westphalia, Germany

Service
- Route number: 485 (long distance); 450.8 (S-Bahn)

Technical
- Line length: 24 km (15 mi)
- Track gauge: 1,435 mm (4 ft 8 1/2 in) standard gauge
- Operating speed: 140 km/h (87 mph)

The Mönchengladbach–Düsseldorf railway is a 24 km long main line on the left (western) bank of the Rhine in the Lower Rhine region of the German state of North Rhine-Westphalia. It has at least two tracks with continuous overhead electrification. The line was built by the Aachen-Düsseldorf-Ruhrort Railway Company and is one of the oldest lines in Germany, opened in 1853 and 1854.

== History ==
The Aachen-Neuß-Düsseldorf Railway Company (Aachen-Neuß-Düsseldorfer Eisenbahngesellschaft, AND) was founded to build a railway line from Aachen via Gladbach (now Mönchengladbach) and Neuss to Düsseldorf. This company depended on Prussian government guarantees and from 1850, it came under the management of the government-controlled Aachen-Düsseldorf-Ruhrort Railway Company (Aachen-Düsseldorf-Ruhrorter Eisenbahn), along with the Ruhrort-Crefeld District Gladbach Railway Company, which opened the Duisburg-Ruhrort–Mönchengladbach line in 1849 and 1851.

Prior to the Austro-Prussian War, the Prussian military opposed the building of fixed bridges across the Rhine for military reasons, except in fortified cities such as Cologne, Mainz, Koblenz and Düsseldorf. The line was built from Gladbach to Obercassel (now Oberkassel) and completed on 16 December 1852. Passenger services opened a month later on 17 January 1853. After completion of the line to the Belgian border at Aachen on 16 October 1854, freight traffic ran on the entire line. At the same time, Rhine station (Rheinstation) in Obercassel was opened.

In 1866, the Aachen-Düsseldorf-Ruhrort Railway Company was acquired by the Bergisch-Märkische Railway Company (Bergisch-Märkische Eisenbahn-Gesellschaft, BME). In July 1870, the Hamm Railway Bridge was opened over the Rhine, connecting to the BME’s Rheinknie station in Düsseldorf and bypassing the Neuss Hauptbahnhof–Obercassel section. In 1882, the BME was nationalised and became part of Prussian state railways. In 1891, the new Düsseldorf Hauptbahnhof was opened and the line from Mönchengladbach was realigned to run to it. The line from Neuss to Oberkassel was closed in 1996.

== Current situation ==
Following the establishment of the Rhine-Ruhr S-Bahn line S 8, part of the line was upgraded. Between Düsseldorf Hbf and Neuss Hbf, there is a separate two-track S-Bahn line next to the two-track main line.

== Rail services ==
The route is served (as of 2018) by Regional-Express trains on lines RE 4 (Wupper-Express) and RE 13 (Maas-Wupper-Express). It is also served by S-Bahn lines S 8 (on the whole line), S 11 and S 28 (both between Düsseldorf and Neuss).

== Planning ==
It is planned to establish a new station at Neuss Stadtwald between Neuss Hbf and Büttgen.
