= Korschenbroich =

Town in North Rhine-Westphalia, Germany

- Town
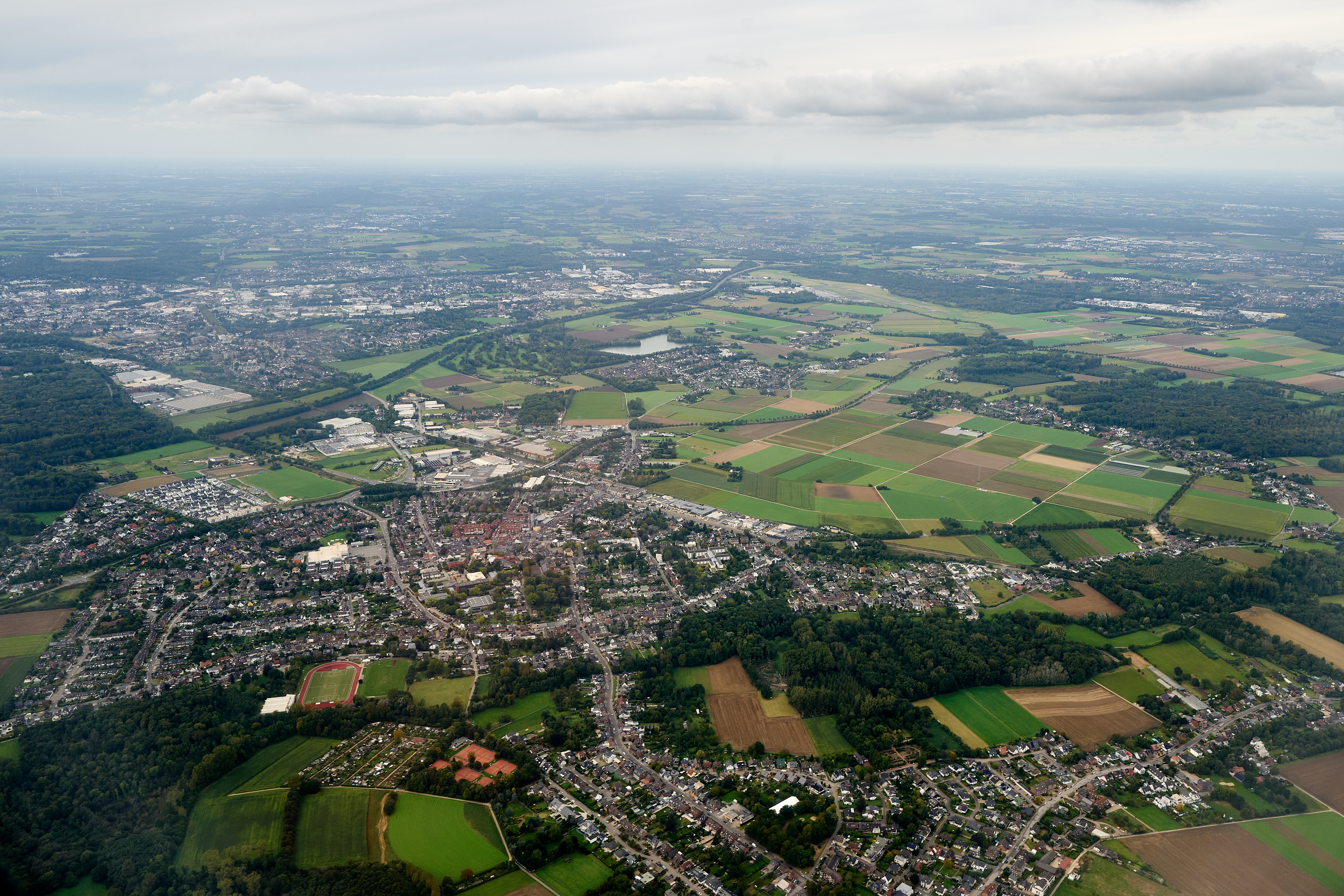
- Aerial view

- Flag Coat of arms

- Location of Korschenbroich within Rhein-Kreis Neuss district
- Interactive map of Korschenbroich
- Location within Germany Location within North Rhine-Westphalia
- Coordinates: 51°11′N 6°31′E
- Country: Germany
- State: North Rhine-Westphalia
- Admin. region: Düsseldorf
- District: Rhein-Kreis Neuss
- Subdivisions: 6

Government
  - Mayor (2020–25): Marc Venten (CDU)

Area
  - Total: 55.26 km^{2} (21.34 sq mi)
- Elevation: 37–74 m (121–243 ft)

Population (2025-12-31)
  - Total: 34,444
  - Density: 623.3/km^{2} (1,614/sq mi)
- Time zone: UTC+01:00 (CET)
  - Summer (DST): UTC+02:00 (CEST)
- Postal codes: 41352
- Dialling codes: 02161, 02166, 02182, 02131
- Vehicle registration: NE
- Website: www.korschenbroich.de

Korschenbroich (German pronunciation: [kɔʁʃn̩ˈbʁoːx]; Limburgish: Korsjebrooch) is a town in the Rhein-Kreis Neuss, in North Rhine-Westphalia, Germany. It is situated on the river Niers, approx. 13 km west of Neuss and 5 km east of Mönchengladbach.

On May 31, 2025, a Beechcraft Bonanza crashed in a terrace of a residential house in the town. A person on the ground was killed, along with one person on the plane.

== Population ==
Historical population

Year	Pop.	±% p.a.
1965	19,544	—
1970	22,270	+2.65%
1975	24,421	+1.86%
1980	26,164	+1.39%
1985	27,179	+0.76%
1990	29,227	+1.46%
1995	31,740	+1.66%

Year	Pop.	±% p.a.
2000	33,782	+1.25%
2005	33,498	−0.17%
2010	33,078	−0.25%
2015	32,922	−0.09%
2020	33,484	+0.34%
2025	34,444	+0.57%

Source: Landesdatabank Nordrhein-Westfalen

== Twin towns – sister cities ==
Korschenbroich is twinned with:

- Carbonne, France

== Gallery ==
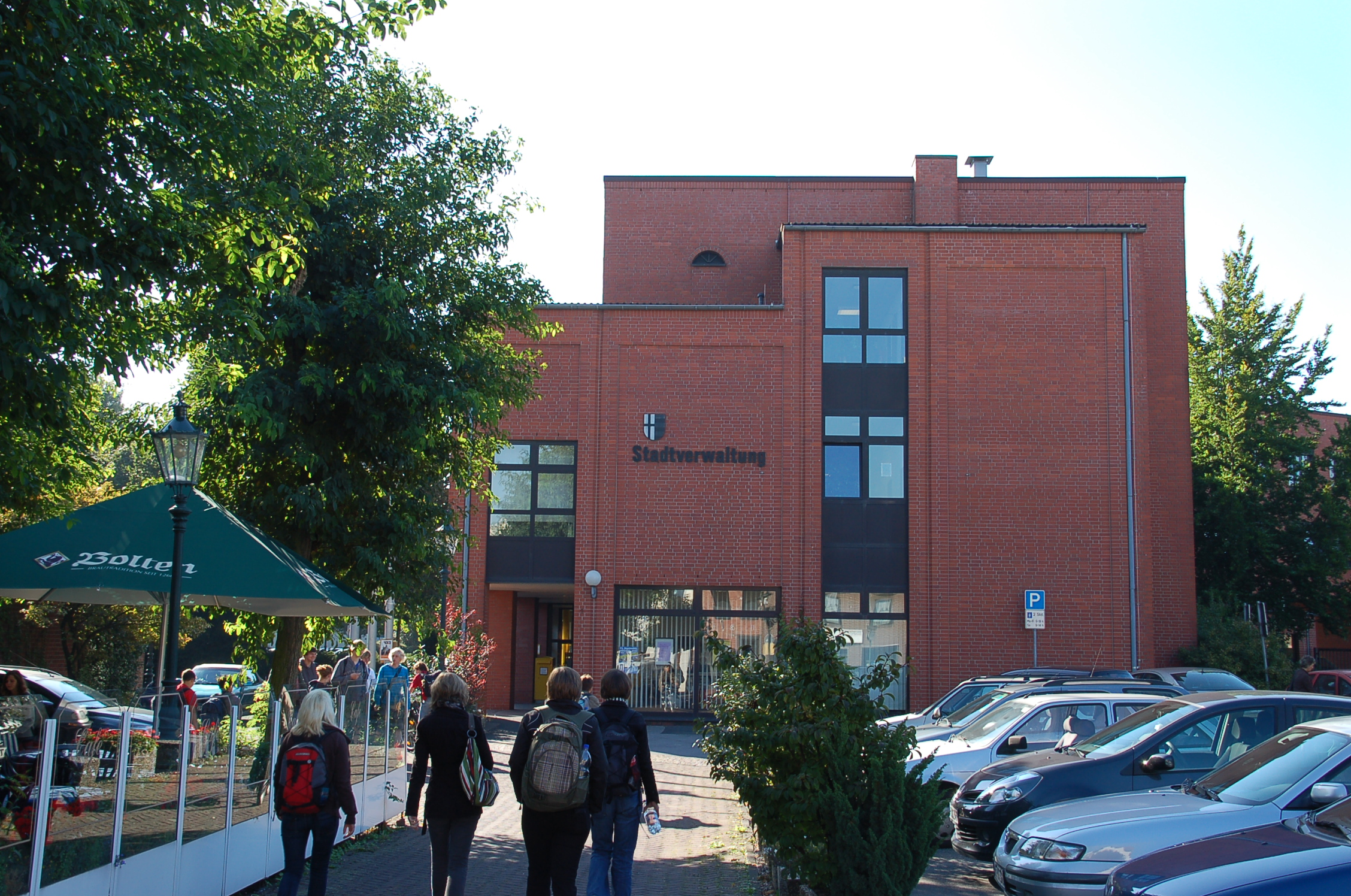
City hall

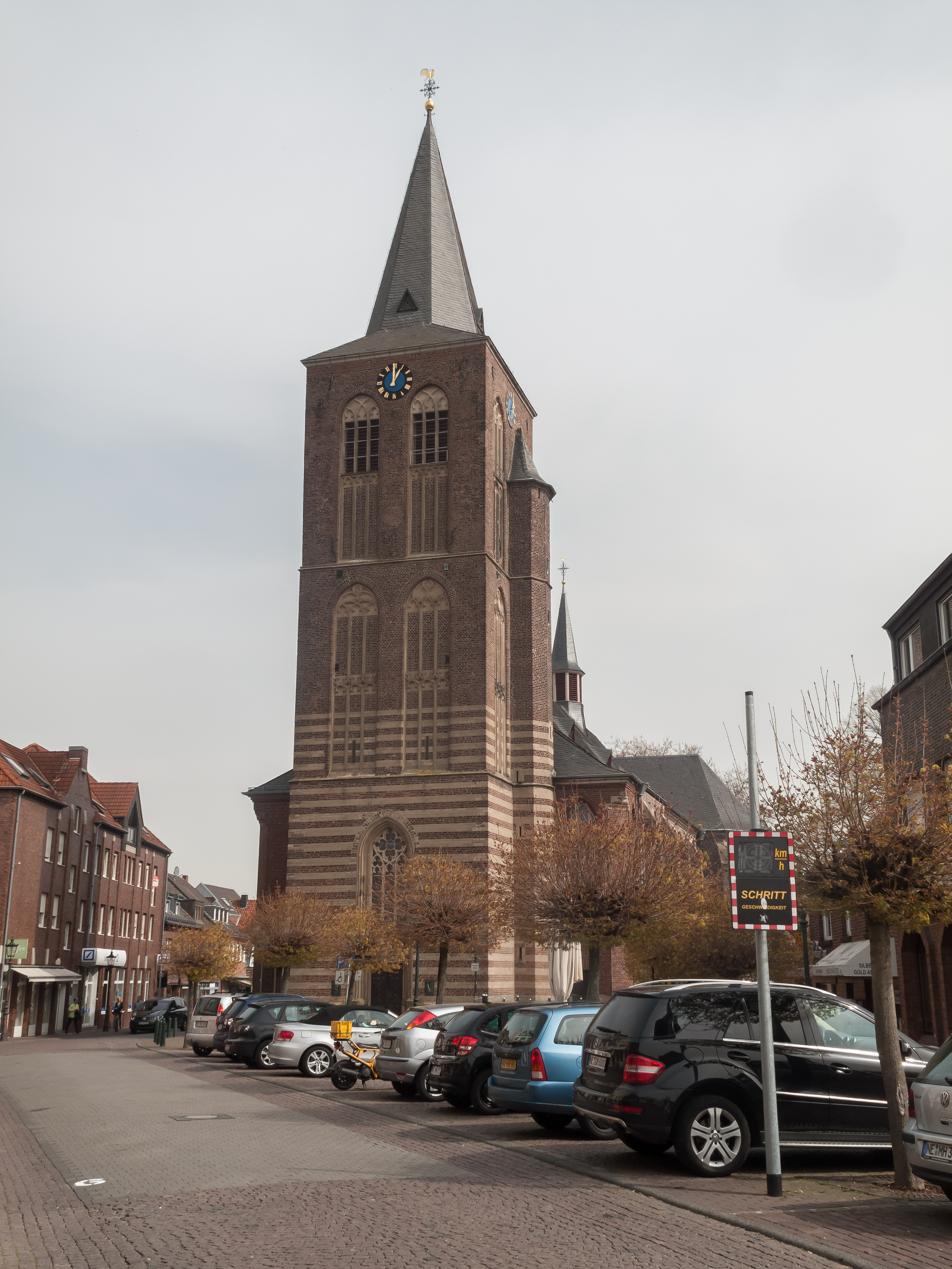
Catholic Church of Saint Andreas

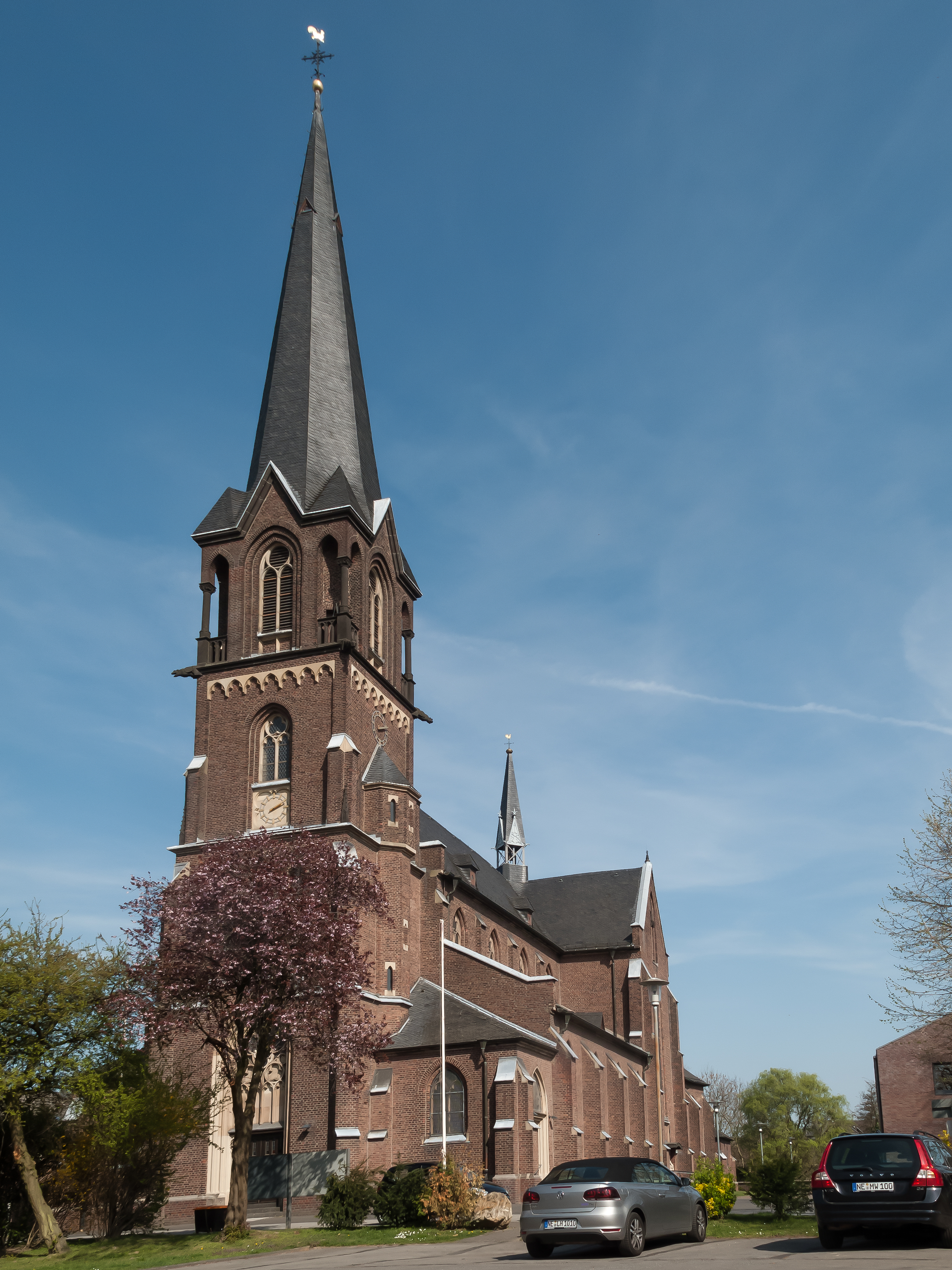
Catholic Church of Saint Pankratius
