= Rhine-Ruhr metropolitan region =

Urban area in Germany

Rhine-Ruhr metropolitan region Metropolregion Rhein-Ruhr
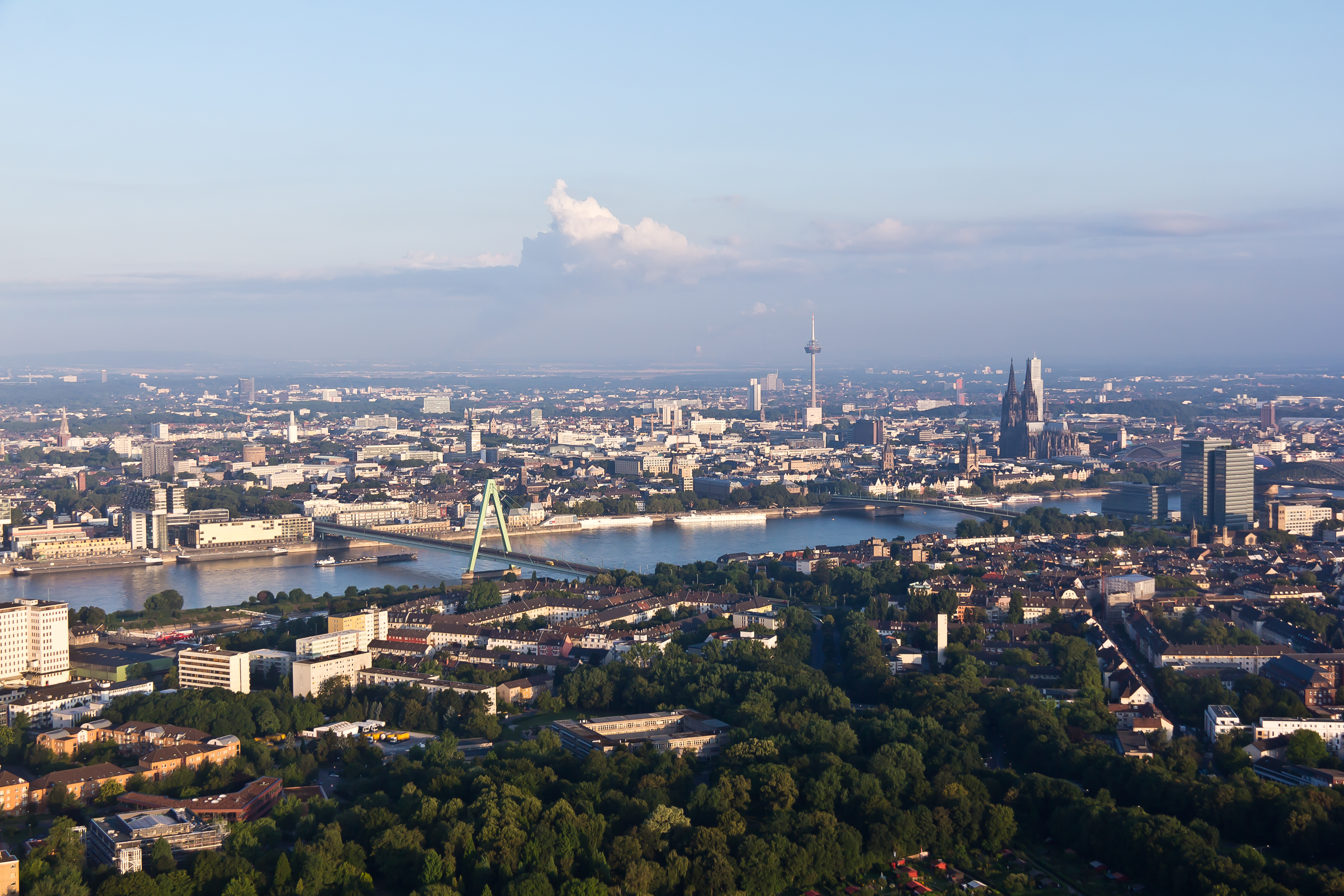
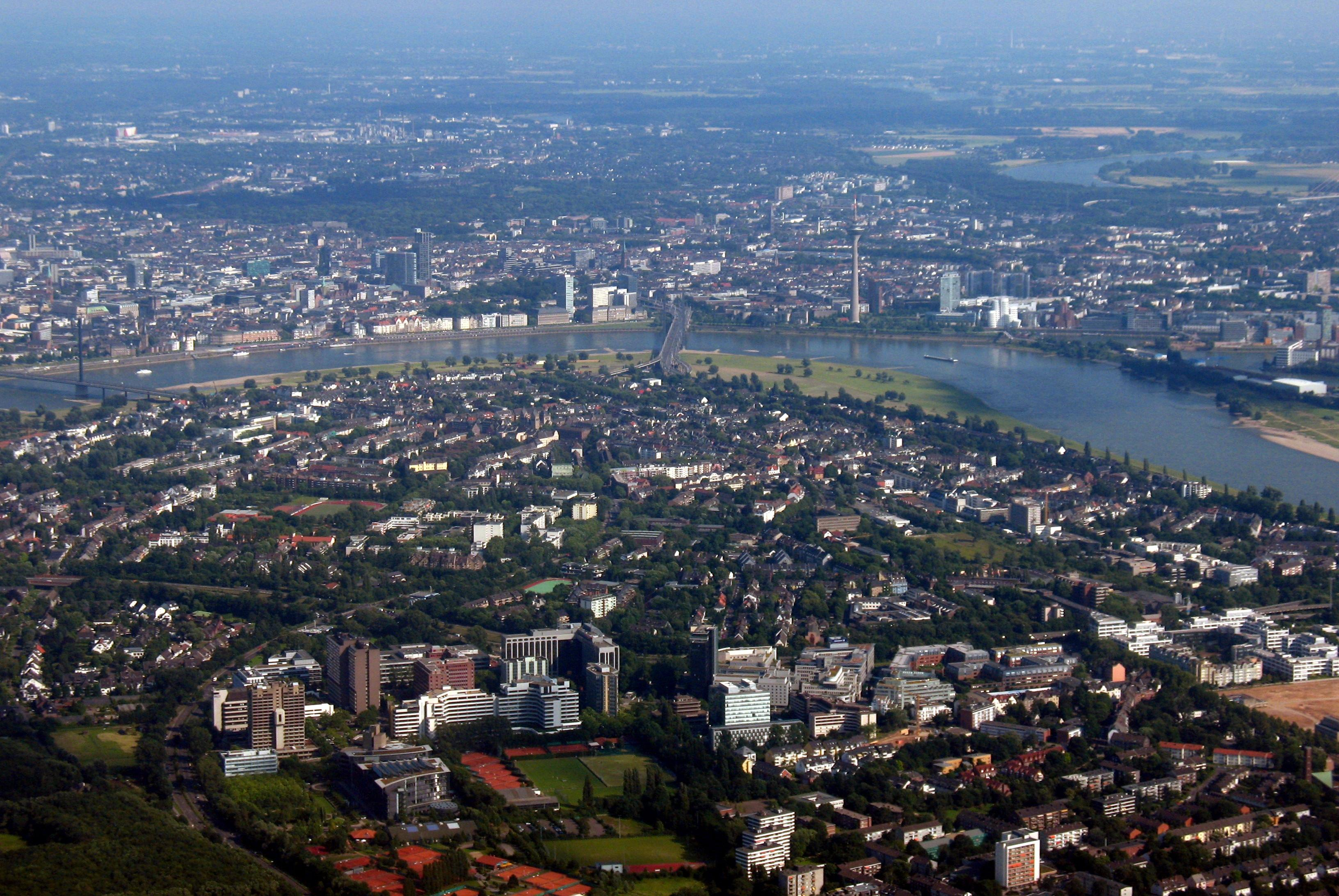
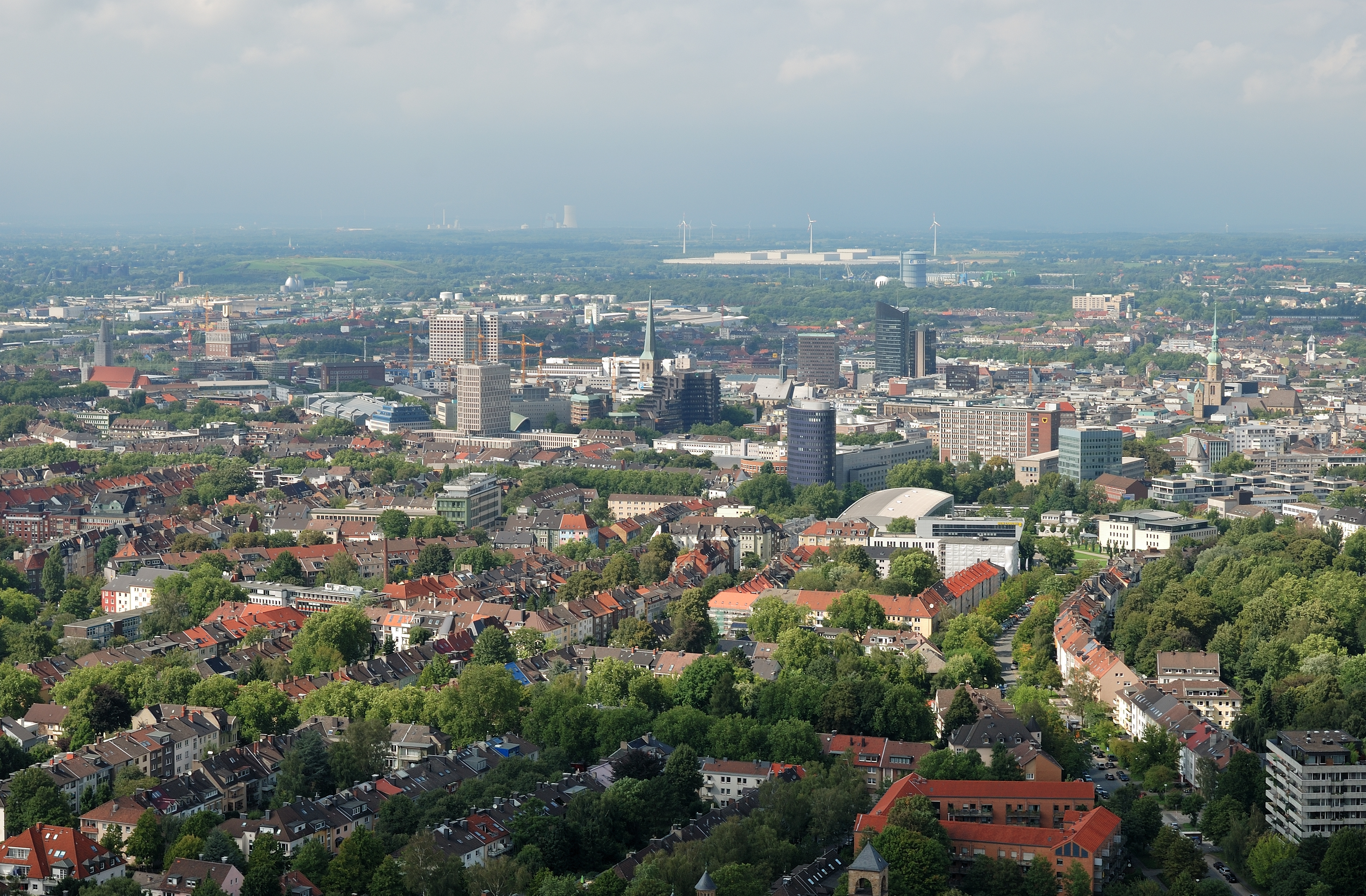
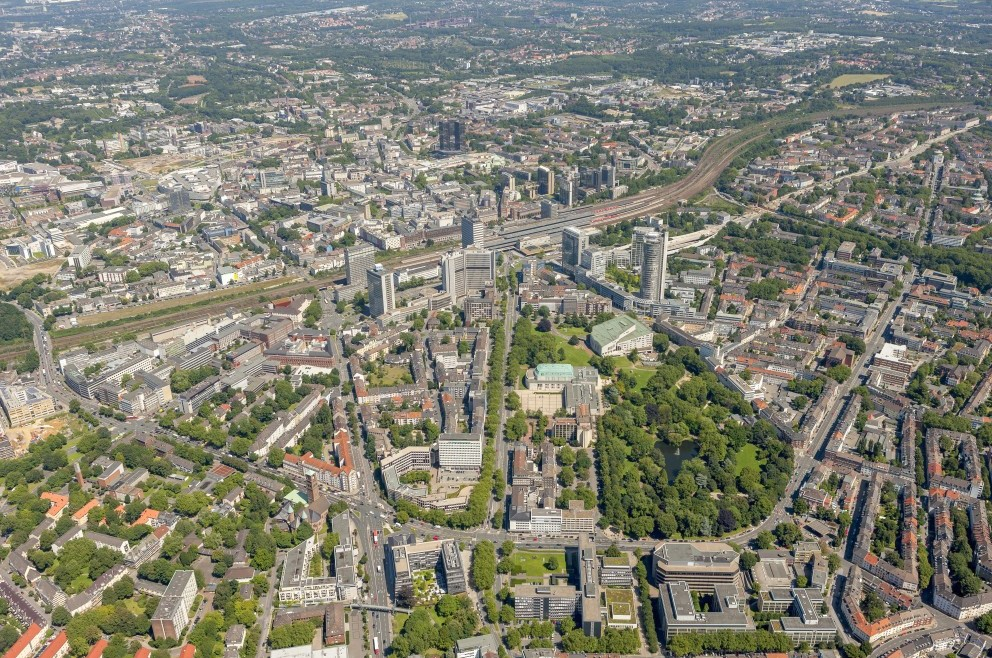
- From top, left to right: Aerial view of Cologne; Aerial view of Düsseldorf, the state capital of North Rhine-Westphalia; Dortmund; Essen

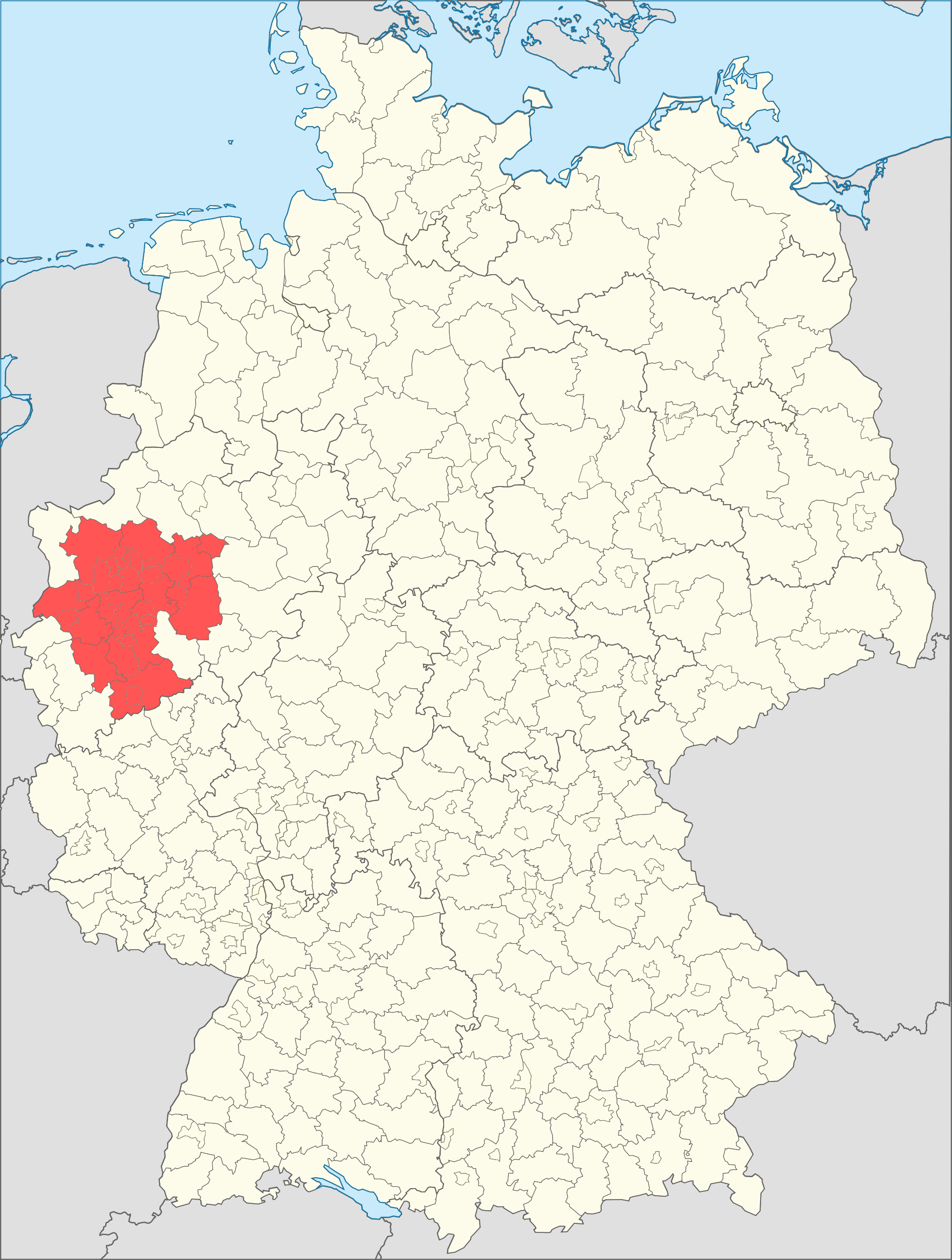
- The Rhine-Ruhr metropolitan region of Germany
- Coordinates: 51°27′N 6°53′E
- Country: Germany
- State: North Rhine-Westphalia
- Largest cities: Cologne; Düsseldorf; Dortmund; Essen; Duisburg; Bochum; Wuppertal; Bonn; Mönchengladbach; Gelsenkirchen

Government
  - Type: None

Area
  - Metro: 7,110 km^{2} (2,750 sq mi)
- Highest elevation: 494 m (1,621 ft)
- Lowest elevation: 20 m (66 ft)

Population (December 31, 2025)
  - Metro: 11,391,459
  - Metro density: 1,600/km^{2} (4,150/sq mi)

GDP
  - Metro: €575.500 billion (2022)
  - Per capita: €44,269 (2022)
- Time zone: UTC+1 (CET)

The Rhine-Ruhr metropolitan region (German: Metropolregion Rhein-Ruhr) is the largest metropolitan region in Germany, with over ten million inhabitants. A polycentric conurbation with several major urban concentrations, the region covers an area of 7,110 square kilometres (2,750 sq mi), entirely within the state of North Rhine-Westphalia. The Rhine-Ruhr metropolitan region spreads from the Ruhr area (Dortmund-Bochum-Essen-Duisburg) in the north to the urban areas of the cities of Mönchengladbach, Düsseldorf (the state capital), Wuppertal, Leverkusen, Cologne (the region's largest and Germany's fourth largest city), and Bonn in the south. The location of the Rhine-Ruhr at the heart of the European Blue Banana makes it well connected to other major European cities and metropolitan areas such as the Randstad, the Flemish Diamond and the Frankfurt Rhine Main Region.

The metropolitan area is named after the Rhine and Ruhr rivers, which are the region's defining geographical features and historically its economic backbone.

== Subdivisions ==
The largest cities in the Rhine-Ruhr area are Cologne, with over one million inhabitants, followed by Düsseldorf, Dortmund and Essen, each of which has around 600.000.

Many unofficial compositions of the Rhine-Ruhr area differ from one another, while the officially defined border of the metropolitan area itself comprises Hamm in the east, Mönchengladbach in the west, Bonn in the south, with the small city of Wesel as its northernmost point. The northern border is similar to that of the Ruhr Area.

This first unofficial table here characterizes the Rhine-Ruhr area as comprising three regions, which together constitute an area much larger than officially defined.

| Region | Major cities | Population | Area |
|---|---|---|---|
| Ruhr Metropolitan Region | | 5,172,745 | 4,435 km^{2} |
| | Dortmund | 587,696 | 280 km^{2} |
| | Essen | 588,375 | 210 km^{2} |
| | Duisburg | 495,885 | 233 km^{2} |
| | Bochum | 385,626 | 145 km^{2} |
| | Gelsenkirchen | 268,102 | 105 km^{2} |
| | Oberhausen | 212,568 | 77 km^{2} |
| Düsseldorf Metropolitan Region | | 2,944,700 | 2,404 km^{2} |
| | Düsseldorf | 644,280 | 217 km^{2} |
| | Neuss | 152,731 | 99 km^{2} |
| | Mönchengladbach | 274,090 | 170 km^{2} |
| | Wuppertal | 351,050 | 168 km^{2} |
| Cologne Bonn Region | | 2,818,178 | 2,920 km^{2} |
| | Cologne | 1,089,879 | 405 km^{2} |
| | Bonn | 335,975 | 141 km^{2} |
| | Leverkusen | 160,819 | 79 km^{2} |
| Rhine-Ruhr | | 11,391,459 | 9,759 km^{2} |

Eurostat's Urban Audit splits the Rhine-Ruhr region into six Functional Urban Areas (FUA). None of these six Urban Zones includes the cities of Remscheid and Solingen or the district of Rhein-Kreis Neuss.

| Larger Urban Zone | Major cities | Population | Area |
|---|---|---|---|
| Ruhr Larger Urban Zone | | 5,172,745 | 4,434 km^{2} |
| | Dortmund | 587,696 | 280 km^{2} |
| | Essen | 588,375 | 210 km^{2} |
| | Duisburg | 495,885 | 233 km^{2} |
| Düsseldorf Larger Urban Zone | | 1,525,774 | 1,200 km^{2} |
| | Düsseldorf | 644,280 | 217 km^{2} |
| | Neuss | 152,731 | 99 km^{2} |
| | Ratingen | 91,722 | 67 km^{2} |
| Mönchengladbach Larger Urban Zone | | 415,729 | 400 km^{2} |
| | Mönchengladbach | 274,090 | 170 km^{2} |
| | Viersen | 78,315 | 91 km^{2} |
| | Korschenbroich | 34,324 | 55 km^{2} |
| | Wegberg | 29,000 | 84 km^{2} |
| Wuppertal Larger Urban Zone | | 625,565 | 333 km^{2} |
| | Wuppertal | 351,050 | 168 km^{2} |
| | Remscheid | 112,970 | 75 km^{2} |
| | Solingen | 161,545 | 90 km^{2} |
| Cologne Larger Urban Zone | | 1,899,930 | 1,627 km^{2} |
| | Cologne | 1,089,879 | 405 km^{2} |
| Bonn Larger Urban Zone | | 918,248 | 1,295 km^{2} |
| | Bonn | 335,975 | 141 km^{2} |
| Rhine-Ruhr | | 10,542,152 | 9,289 km^{2} |

== Economy ==
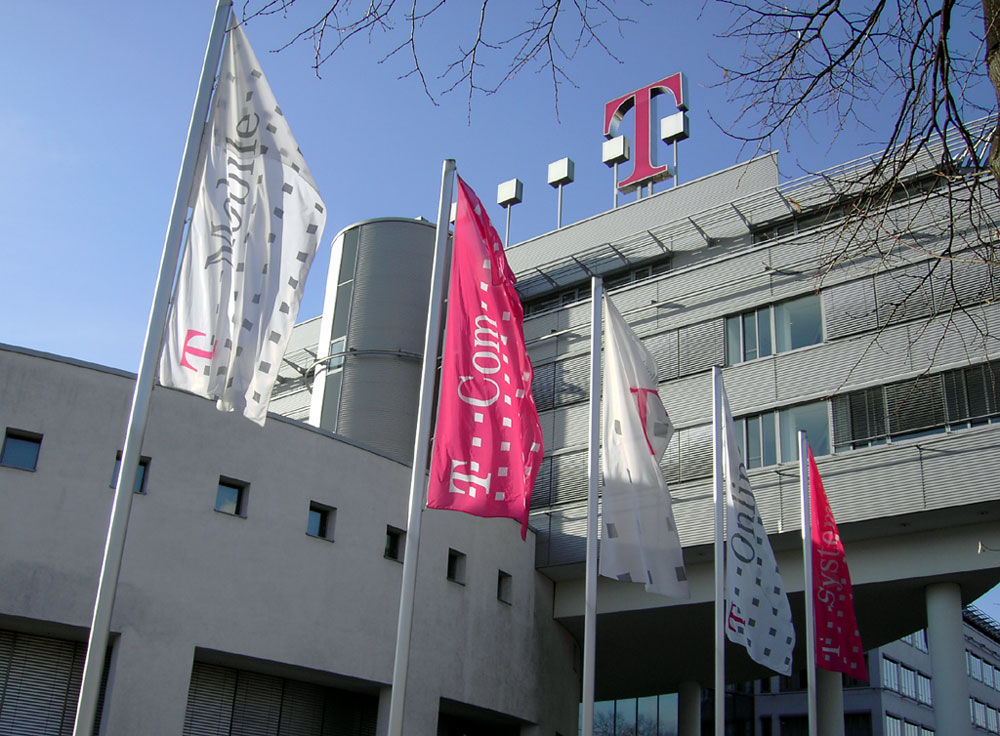
Deutsche Telekom headquarters in Bonn

Historically, most of the Ruhr area was for the most part characterized by heavy industry since the age of industrialisation in the late 19th and early 20th century. Since the Middle Ages, Cologne, Dortmund, and other cities were important regional trading cities, but during the 19th century the city of Düsseldorf grew to become the administrative center of the region and since 1945, its political capital.

Today, the Rhine-Ruhr metropolitan region accounts for roughly 15% of the GDP of the German economy, which would place it as the 2nd largest metropolitan area GDP in the European Union after the Paris region. Despite this size, the Rhine-Ruhr region as a whole often lacks international competitiveness because it lacks a unified presentation. Cities and urban areas within it often pursue separate investment policies against each other.

From within, Düsseldorf, Essen, and Cologne are by far the largest economic centers, with specialisation in financial/high tech and insurance/multi media services respectively. Other major economic centers are Bonn and Dortmund. The region is home to twelve Fortune Global 500 companies, among them E.ON (Essen), Deutsche Post (Bonn), Metro (Düsseldorf), Deutsche Telekom (Bonn), ThyssenKrupp (Essen), RWE (Essen), Bayer (Leverkusen), Franz Haniel & Cie. (Duisburg), Evonik (Essen), Hochtief (Essen) and the Henkel Group (Düsseldorf).

== Climate ==
The Rhine-Ruhr area's climate is characterized by having the warmest winters in Germany, especially its western part at the Lower Rhine area. Classified by Köppen-Geiger climate classification to be oceanic (Cfb).

Düsseldorf

Climate chart (precipitation, max. and min. temperature)
| J | F | M | A | M | J | J | A | S | O | N | D |
| 55 6 2 | 56 8 2 | 50 11 3 | 27 16 5 | 43 20 9 | 69 24 14 | 54 25 14 | 66 25 15 | 44 21 11 | 37 15 9 | 46 10 5 | 54 8 4 |
- █ Average max. and min. temperatures in °C
- █ Precipitation totals in mm
- Source: Weatheronline
Imperial conversion
| J | F | M | A | M | J | J | A | S | O | N | D |
| 2.2 43 35 | 2.2 47 35 | 2 52 38 | 1.1 60 40 | 1.7 67 47 | 2.7 75 56 | 2.1 78 58 | 2.6 77 58 | 1.7 70 52 | 1.5 60 47 | 1.8 51 41 | 2.1 47 39 |
- █ Average max. and min. temperatures in °F
- █ Precipitation totals in inches

Essen

Climate chart (precipitation, max. and min. temperature)
| J | F | M | A | M | J | J | A | S | O | N | D |
| 72 4 −1 | 52 5 0 | 65 9 2 | 57 14 5 | 71 18 8 | 85 21 11 | 81 23 13 | 75 22 13 | 67 19 10 | 66 14 7 | 71 8 3 | 81 5 1 |
- █ Average max. and min. temperatures in °C
- █ Precipitation totals in mm
- Source: Climate-Data
Imperial conversion
| J | F | M | A | M | J | J | A | S | O | N | D |
| 2.8 40 31 | 2 41 31 | 2.6 49 36 | 2.2 57 40 | 2.8 65 47 | 3.3 70 52 | 3.2 73 56 | 3 72 55 | 2.6 67 51 | 2.6 58 44 | 2.8 47 38 | 3.2 42 33 |
- █ Average max. and min. temperatures in °F
- █ Precipitation totals in inches

Cologne

Climate chart (precipitation, max. and min. temperature)
| J | F | M | A | M | J | J | A | S | O | N | D |
| 58 5 −1 | 52 6 −1 | 52 10 2 | 53 14 5 | 66 19 8 | 83 22 11 | 78 24 13 | 83 23 13 | 63 20 10 | 55 15 7 | 66 9 3 | 65 5 1 |
- █ Average max. and min. temperatures in °C
- █ Precipitation totals in mm
- Source: Climate-Data
Imperial conversion
| J | F | M | A | M | J | J | A | S | O | N | D |
| 2.3 40 31 | 2 42 31 | 2 50 35 | 2.1 58 40 | 2.6 66 47 | 3.3 72 52 | 3.1 74 56 | 3.3 74 55 | 2.5 68 50 | 2.2 58 44 | 2.6 48 38 | 2.6 42 33 |
- █ Average max. and min. temperatures in °F
- █ Precipitation totals in inches

Dortmund

Climate chart (precipitation, max. and min. temperature)
| J | F | M | A | M | J | J | A | S | O | N | D |
| 71 4 −1 | 52 5 −1 | 64 9 2 | 56 13 4 | 69 18 8 | 82 21 11 | 81 22 13 | 74 22 12 | 67 19 10 | 62 14 7 | 71 8 3 | 80 5 0 |
- █ Average max. and min. temperatures in °C
- █ Precipitation totals in mm
- Source: Climate-Data
Imperial conversion
| J | F | M | A | M | J | J | A | S | O | N | D |
| 2.8 39 30 | 2 41 31 | 2.5 48 35 | 2.2 56 40 | 2.7 64 46 | 3.2 70 52 | 3.2 72 55 | 2.9 71 54 | 2.6 66 49 | 2.4 57 44 | 2.8 46 37 | 3.1 41 33 |
- █ Average max. and min. temperatures in °F
- █ Precipitation totals in inches

== Transportation ==
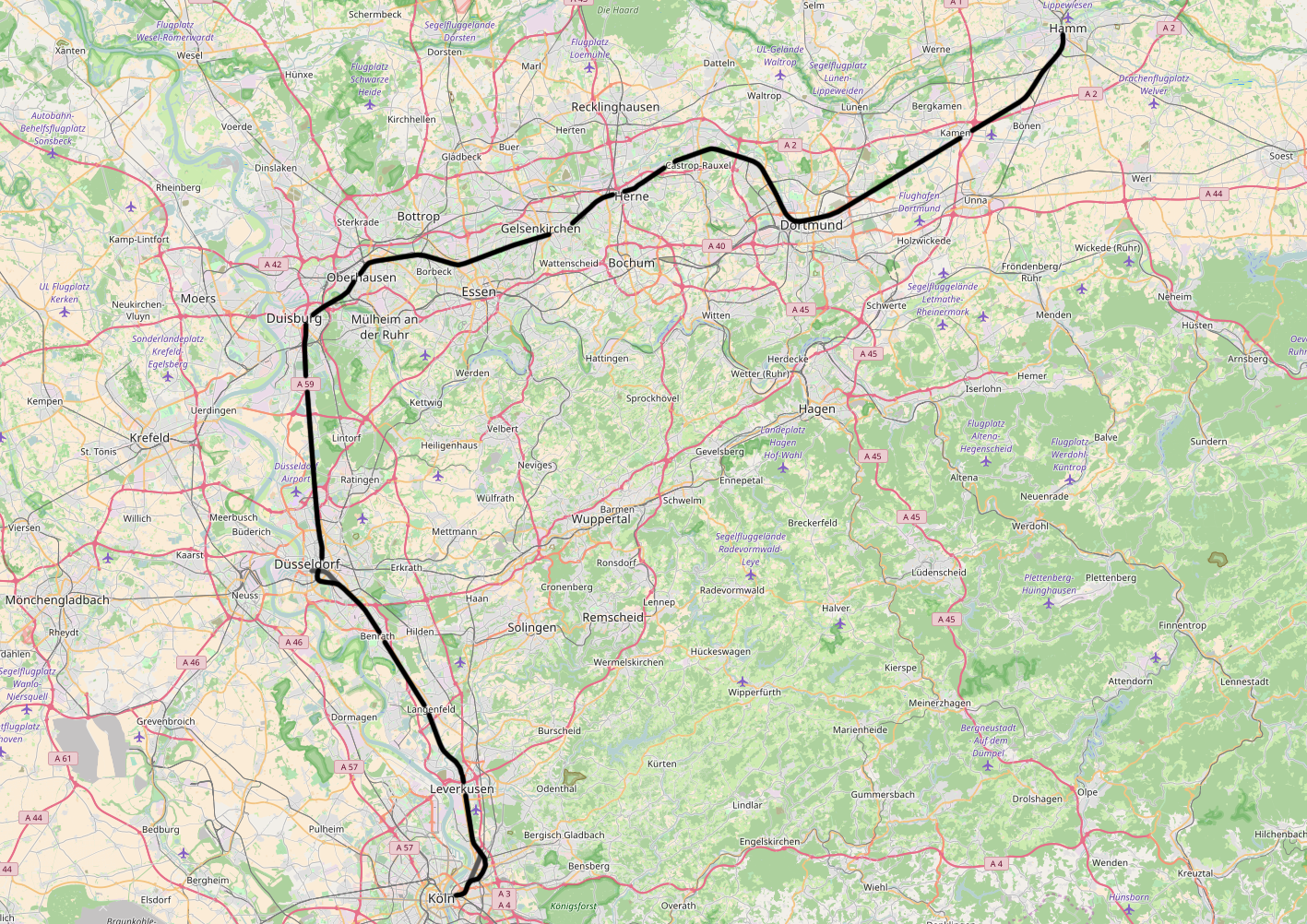
Map of DB 2650 connecting Cologne with Hamm

=== Air ===
The area has four international commercial airports, and several smaller aerodromes for general aviation.

| Airport | IATA code | ICAO code | annual passenger traffic |
|---|---|---|---|
| Düsseldorf Airport | DUS | EDDL | 25.51 M. (2019) |
| Cologne Bonn Airport | CGN | EDDK | 12.39 M. (2019) |
| Dortmund Airport | DTM | EDLW | 2.72 M. (2019) |
| Weeze Airport | NRN | EDLV | 1.23 M. (2019) |

=== Road ===
The network of Autobahns in North Rhine-Westphalia is the most dense in all of Germany.

=== Public transport ===
The rail, S-Bahn, U-Bahn and bus companies are administered through a consortium of local and regional transport lines, the Verkehrsverbund Rhein-Ruhr. It offers a rapid transit system which interconnects all cities and their respective local buses, trams, U- and S-Bahn systems, partly under the umbrella of Deutsche Bahn. Their systems are highly integrated where even some subway lines continue from one city to the next (for example between Düsseldorf and Duisburg or Bochum and Herne, which is unique in Germany, as the city border is crossed underground). The region is divided into several urban zones and fares are paid according to the amount of urban areas (or zones) passed through. Tickets include door to door transportation with all forms covered in one ticket with the exception of high speed rail (which only stops in the major cities). Some excursions, theatre and opera tickets as well as museums offer free transportation from any point in the Rhine Ruhr area to the venue and return.

=== Waterways ===
Port of Duisburg (Duisport) and Dortmund Port are large industrial inland ports and serve as hubs along the Rhine and the German inland water transport system.

== Tourism ==
=== Events ===
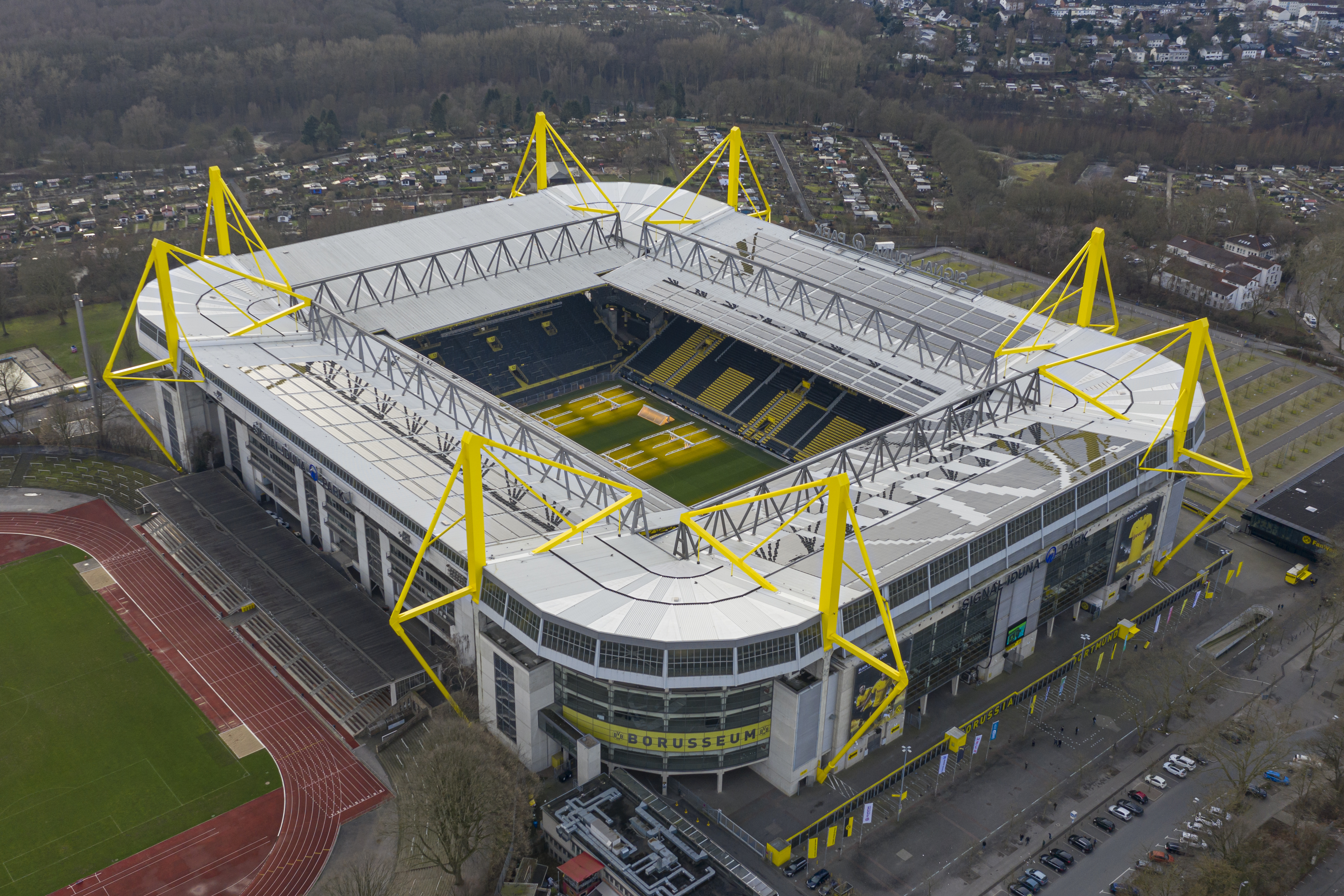
Westfalenstadion, the stadium of Bundesliga club Borussia Dortmund, is the largest stadium in Germany.

The region is host to numerous large events, comprising fun fairs and cultural events like the Cologne and Düsseldorf carnivals (carnival is however a public event in almost all cities and towns of the area), the Cologne Comedy Festival, Ruhrfestspiele Recklinghausen, and the RuhrTriennale, as well as Gamescom and other trade fairs at Koelnmesse—Cologne Trade Fair and Messe Düsseldorf; and Essen Motor Show in Essen. With a capacity of up to 20,000 people, the Lanxess Arena and Westfalenhallen are amongst the largest indoor arenas in Germany.

The region is home to a total of 13 Bundesliga football clubs, of which five are active in the season of 2017–18. The most successful among them are Borussia Dortmund, Borussia Mönchengladbach, 1. FC Köln, FC Schalke 04 and Bayer 04 Leverkusen. The Revierderby is the rivalry between Borussia Dortmund and Schalke 04, one of the most significant in German football. Westfalenstadion, the stadium of Borussia Dortmund, is the biggest stadium in Germany. The area had plans to bid for the 2032 Summer Olympics, before the IOC declared Brisbane to be the host.

=== Landmarks ===
The Zeche Zollverein coal mine

Several tourist destinations within the region attract over 12 million tourists per year. Cologne Cathedral, Augustusburg and Falkenlust Palaces at Brühl and the Zollverein Coal Mine Industrial Complex at Essen are UNESCO World Heritage Sites. Other sights include Schloss Benrath in Düsseldorf and several anchor points of the European Route of Industrial Heritage.

=== Museums ===
NRW Forum, Kunstsammlung Nordrhein-Westfalen, Kunsthalle Düsseldorf, Museum Koenig, Museum Ludwig, Romano-Germanic Museum, Wallraf-Richartz Museum, Neanderthal Museum, Museum Folkwang, Museum Ostwall, Lehmbruck Museum, German Mining Museum and Deutsches Museum Bonn are some of the most famous examples.

== Education ==
The Rhine-Ruhr metropolitan region is home to nine universities and over 30 partly postgraduate colleges, with a total of over 300.000 students. The largest and oldest university is the University of Cologne (Universität zu Köln), founded in 1388 AD. Other universities include:

- the Ruhr University Bochum,
- the University of Bonn,
- the German Sport University Cologne,
- the Technical University of Dortmund,
- the University of Duisburg-Essen,
- the University of Düsseldorf,
- the FernUniversität Hagen and
- the University of Wuppertal.

== Municipalities ==
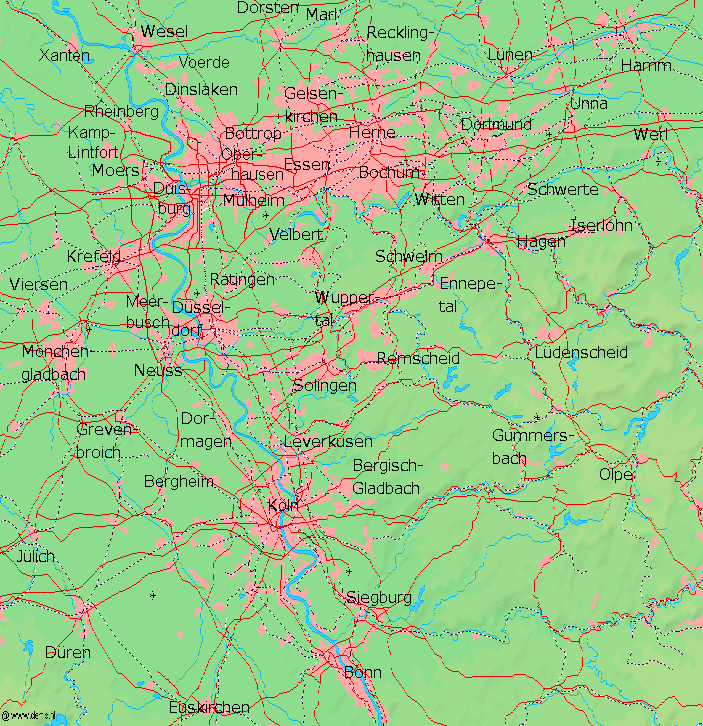
This map of the Rhine-Ruhr Area spans approximately 130 kilometers (81 mi) from north to south.

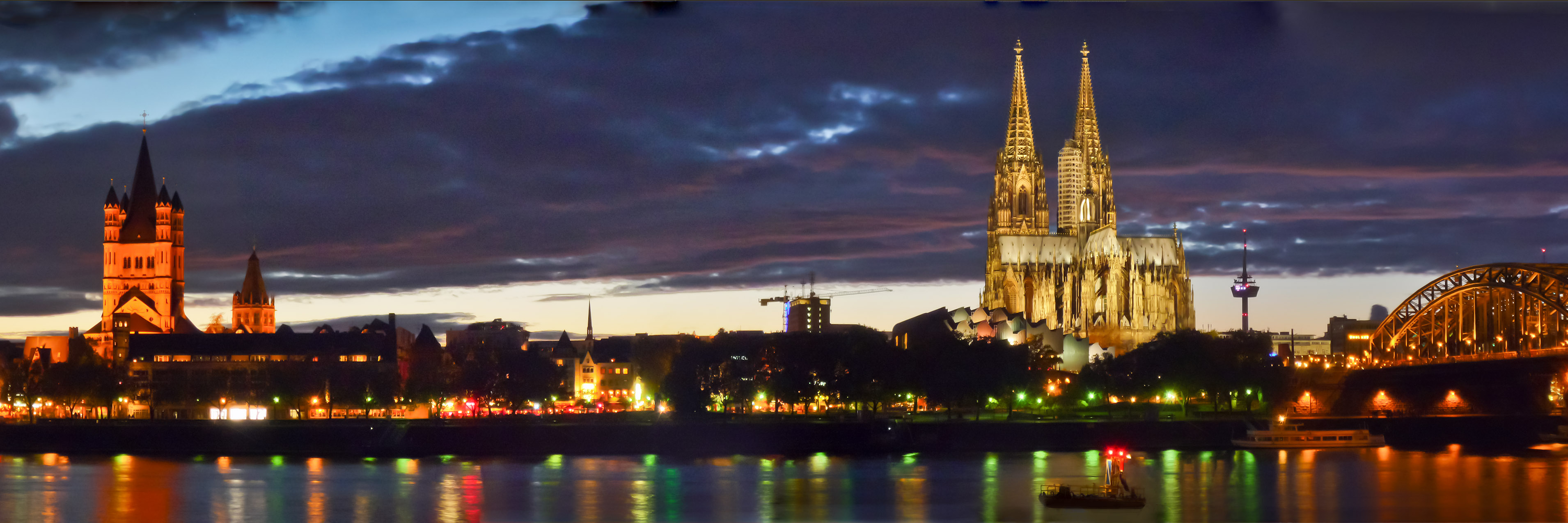
Cologne Cathedral at night

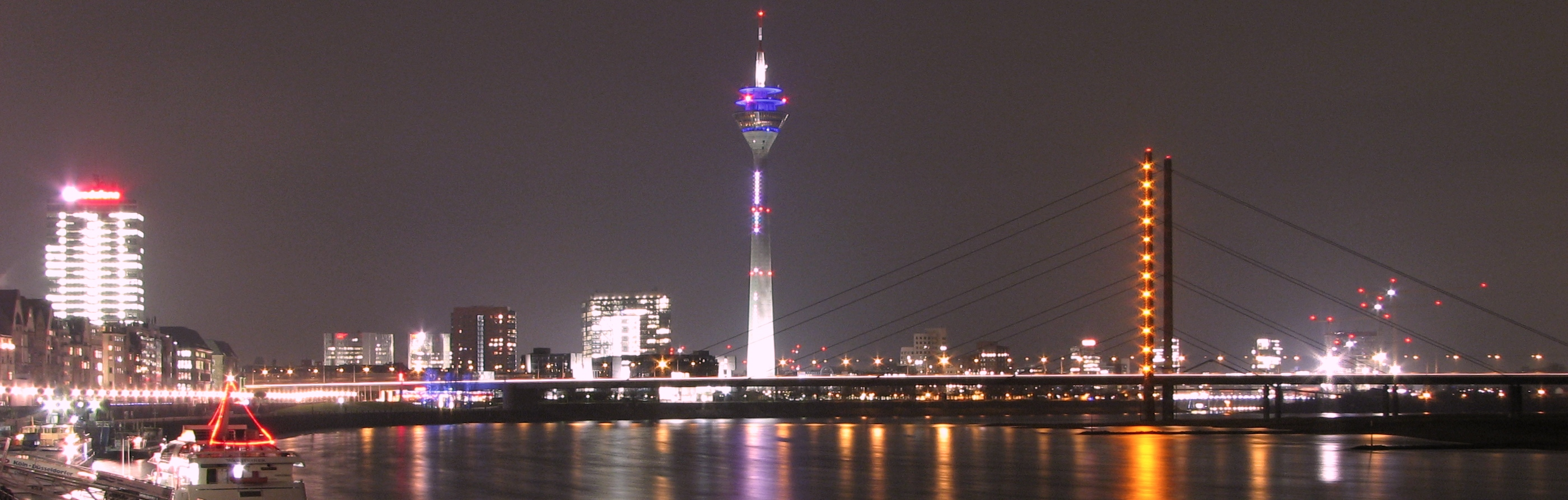
A view of Düsseldorf, the state capital of North Rhine-Westphalia

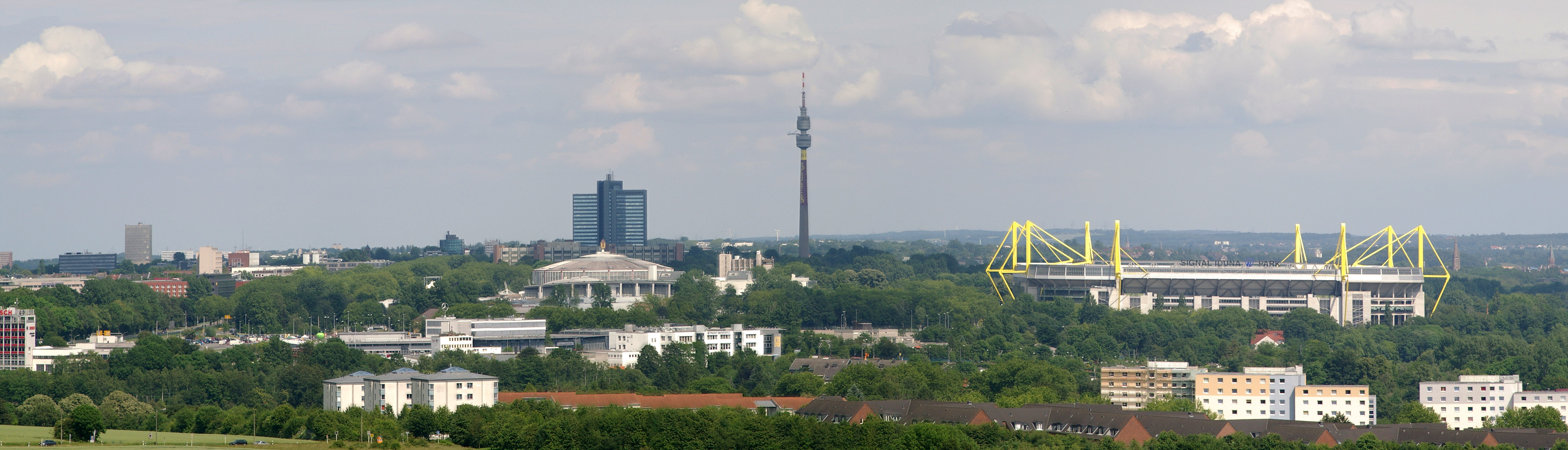
The skyline of Dortmund

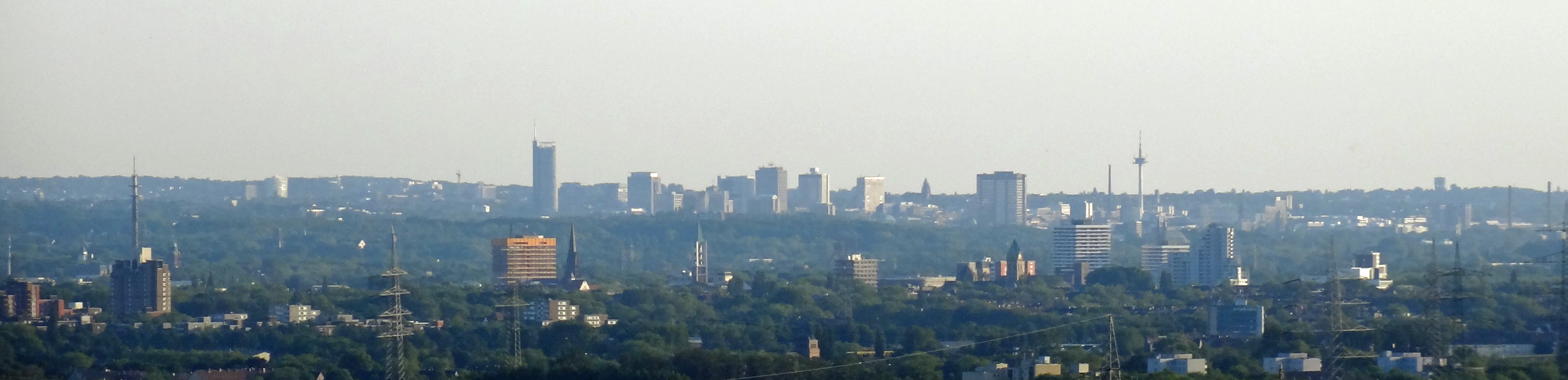
The skyline of Essen

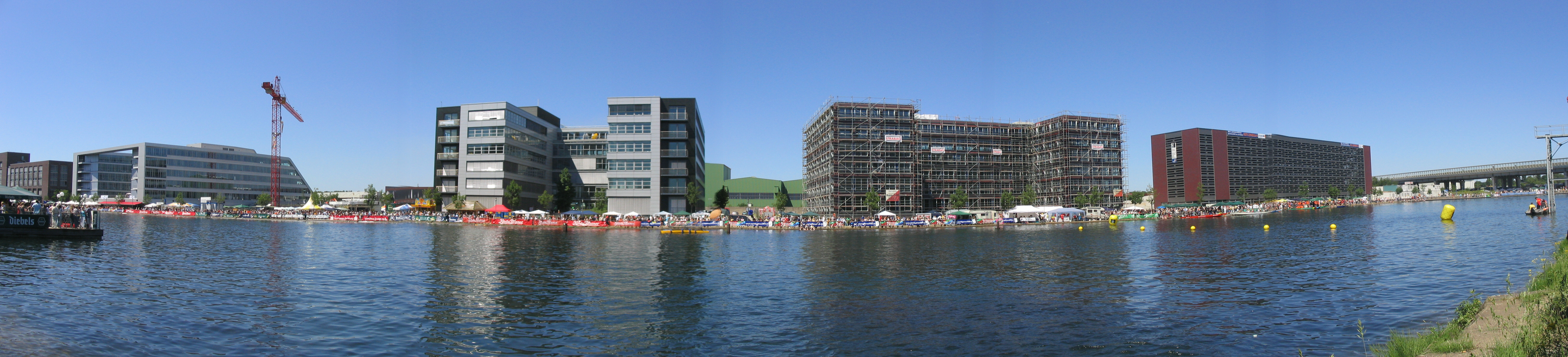
The skyline of Duisburg

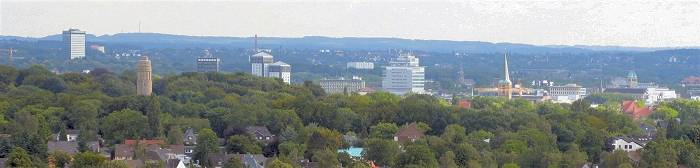
The skyline of Bochum

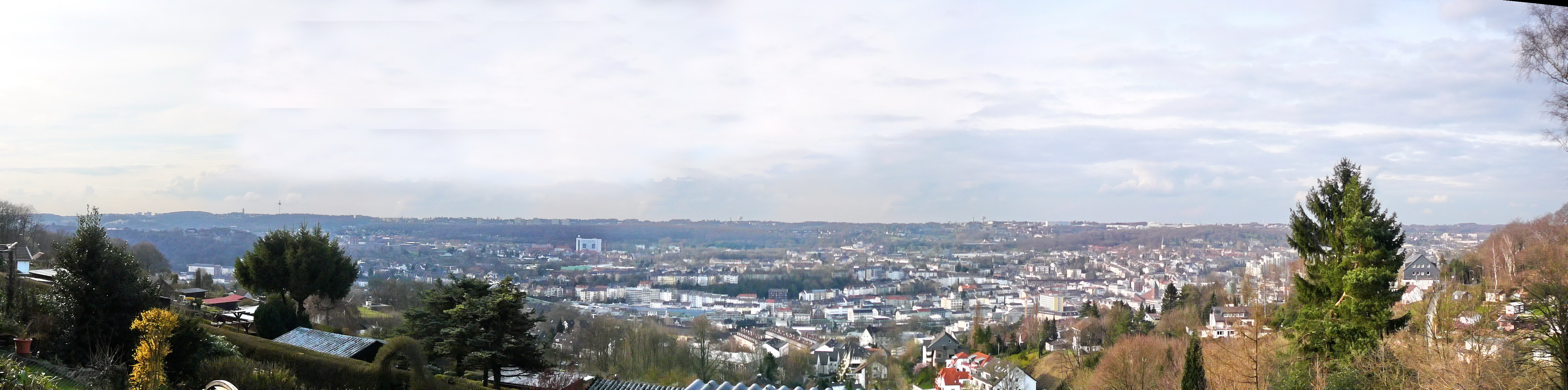
The skyline of Wuppertal

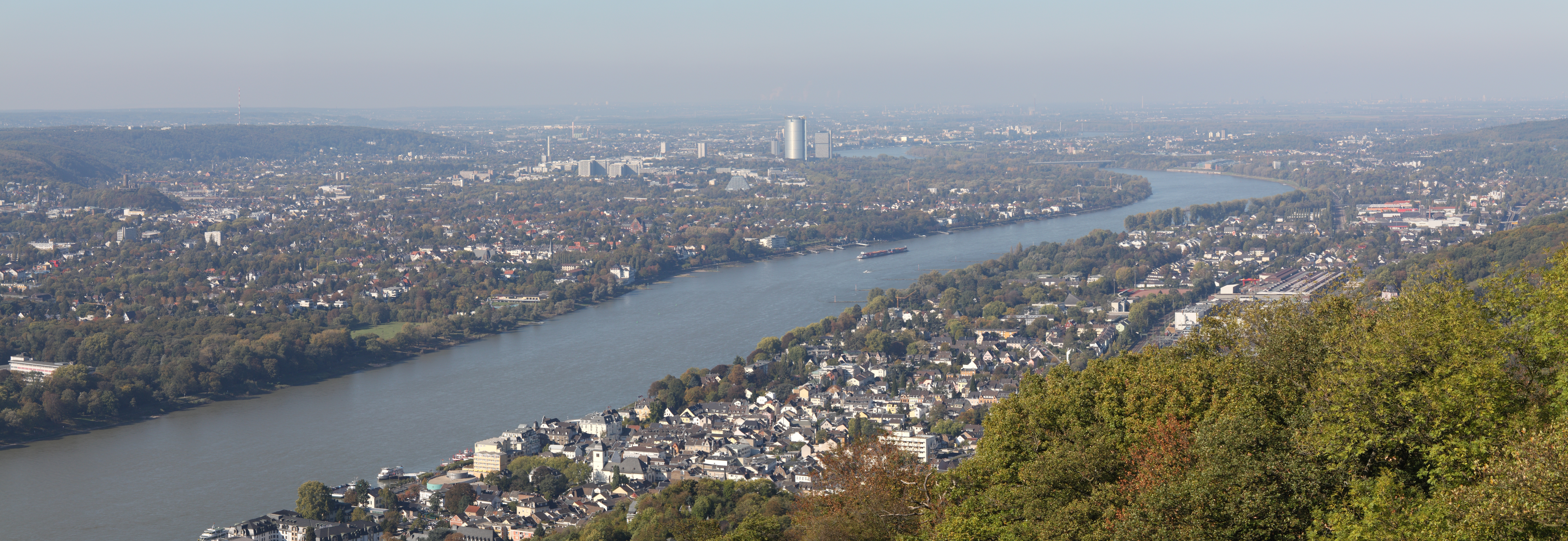
View of Bonn

The following register lists all municipalities that officially belong to Rhine-Ruhr area. Demographically, these municipalities include 20 cities (German: Kreisfreie Städte) each with more than 100,000 inhabitants, and 11 districts (German: Kreis), each with a population of more than 250,000 inhabitants. Some districts only belong partly to Rhine-Ruhr area. In such a case only the municipalities that belong to the metro area are listed.

Cities independent of a Kreis
| Municipality | Inhabitants 31 December 2009 | Surface km^{2} | Inhabitants per/ km^{2} |
|---|---|---|---|
| Bochum (BO) | 376,319 | 145.44 | 2,587.45 |
| Bonn (BN) | 319,841 | 141.22 | 2,264.84 |
| Bottrop (BOT) | 117,241 | 100.61 | 1,165.3 |
| Dortmund (DO) | 581,308 | 280.39 | 2,073.21 |
| Duisburg (DU) | 491,931 | 232.81 | 2,113.01 |
| Düsseldorf (D) | 586,217 | 217.01 | 2,701.34 |
| Essen (E) | 576,259 | 210.38 | 2,739.13 |
| Gelsenkirchen (GE) | 259,744 | 104.86 | 2,477.06 |
| Hagen (HA) | 190,121 | 160.36 | 1,185.59 |
| Hamm (HAM) | 181,741 | 226.26 | 803.24 |
| Herne (HER) | 165,632 | 51.41 | 3,221.79 |
| Cologne (K) | 998,105 | 405.15 | 2,463.54 |
| Krefeld (KR) | 235,414 | 137.76 | 1,708.87 |
| Leverkusen (LEV) | 160,593 | 78.85 | 2,036.69 |
| Mönchengladbach (MG) | 258,251 | 170.45 | 1,515.11 |
| Mülheim an der Ruhr (MH) | 167,471 | 91.29 | 1,834.49 |
| Oberhausen (OB) | 214,024 | 77.04 | 2,778.09 |
| Remscheid (RS) | 111,422 | 74.60 | 1,493.59 |
| Solingen (SG) | 160,992 | 89.46 | 1,799.6 |
| Wuppertal (W) | 351,050 | 168.39 | 2,084.74 |
| total/average | 6,503,676 | 3,163.74 | 2,055.69 |

Kreise (districts)
| Municipality/Kreis (district) | Inhabitants 31 December 2009 | Surface per km^{2} |
Kreis Mettmann (ME)
| Erkrath | 46,084 | 26.89 |
| Haan | 29,156 | 24.22 |
| Heiligenhaus | 26,818 | 27.47 |
| Hilden | 55,551 | 25.96 |
| Langenfeld (Rheinland) | 59,038 | 41.10 |
| Mettmann | 39,374 | 42.52 |
| Monheim am Rhein | 43,065 | 23.10 |
| Ratingen | 91,306 | 88.72 |
| Velbert | 84,633 | 74.90 |
| Wülfrath | 21,420 | 32.23 |
Kreis Unna (UN)
| Bergkamen | 51,149 | 44.80 |
| Bönen | 18,630 | 38.02 |
| Fröndenberg/Ruhr | 22,135 | 56.21 |
| Holzwickede | 17,264 | 22.36 |
| Kamen | 44,803 | 40.93 |
| Lünen | 87,783 | 59.18 |
| Schwerte | 48,523 | 56.20 |
| Selm | 27,123 | 60.34 |
| Unna | 66,652 | 88.52 |
| Werne | 29,994 | 76.08 |
Ennepe-Ruhr-Kreis (EN)
| Ennepetal | 30,778 | 57.42 |
| Gevelsberg | 31,651 | 26.29 |
| Hattingen | 55,817 | 71.39 |
| Herdecke | 24,794 | 22.40 |
| Schwelm | 29,012 | 20.50 |
| Sprockhövel | 25,512 | 47.79 |
| Wetter | 28,221 | 31.47 |
| Witten | 98,601 | 72.37 |

Kreise (districts)
| Municipality/Kreis (district) | Inhabitants 31 December 2009 | Surface per km^{2} |
Märkischer Kreis (MK)
| Hemer | 37,459 | 67.56 |
| Iserlohn | 95,232 | 125.50 |
| Menden | 56,078 | 86.06 |
Kreis Recklinghausen (RE)
| Castrop-Rauxel | 75,752 | 51.66 |
| Datteln | 35,757 | 66.08 |
| Dorsten | 77,308 | 171.19 |
| Gladbeck | 75,520 | 35.91 |
| Herten | 62,639 | 37.32 |
| Marl, North Rhine-Westphalia | 88,202 | 87.63 |
| Oer-Erkenschwick | 30,499 | 38.69 |
| Recklinghausen | 119,050 | 66.43 |
| Waltrop | 29,837 | 46.99 |
Rhein-Erft-Kreis (BM)
| Bergheim | 62,143 | 96.33 |
| Brühl | 44,259 | 36.12 |
| Erftstadt | 50,754 | 119.88 |
| Frechen | 49,752 | 45.11 |
| Hürth | 57,501 | 51.17 |
| Kerpen | 64,669 | 113.94 |
| Wesseling | 35,144 | 23.37 |
Rhein-Kreis Neuss (NE)
| Dormagen | 62,924 | 85.41 |
| Grevenbroich | 64,039 | 102.46 |
| Kaarst | 41,841 | 37.40 |
| Korschenbroich | 33,116 | 55.26 |
| Meerbusch | 54,190 | 64.38 |
| Neuss | 151,280 | 99.48 |

Kreise (districts)
| Municipality/Kreis (district) | Inhabitants 31 December 2009 | Surface per km^{2} |
Rhein-Sieg-Kreis (SU)
| Alfter | 22,895 | 34.77 |
| Bornheim | 48,544 | 82.71 |
| Niederkassel | 37,402 | 35.79 |
| Sankt Augustin | 55,524 | 34.23 |
| Siegburg | 39,654 | 23.46 |
| Troisdorf | 75,150 | 62.17 |
Rheinisch-Bergischer Kreis (GL)
| Bergisch Gladbach | 105,699 | 83.12 |
| Burscheid | 18,771 | 27.38 |
| Leichlingen | 27,476 | 37.33 |
Kreis Viersen (VIE)
| Kempen | 36,040 | 68.81 |
| Tönisvorst | 30,084 | 44.33 |
| Viersen | 75,475 | 91.07 |
| Willich | 51,962 | 67.77 |
Kreis Wesel (WES)
| Dinslaken | 69,687 | 47.67 |
| Kamp-Lintfort | 38,724 | 63.16 |
| Moers | 105,929 | 67.69 |
| Neukirchen-Vluyn | 27,627 | 43.48 |
| Rheinberg | 31,648 | 75.15 |
| Voerde | 37,668 | 53.48 |
| Wesel | 60,958 | 122.53 |
| total | 3,609,212 | 3,946.69 |

== See also ==
- History of the Ruhr
- List of metropolitan areas in Europe by population
- List of metropolitan areas in Germany
- Ruhr Valley
- Katowice-Ostrava metropolitan area
