= Royal Division of the Aachen-Düsseldorf-Ruhrort Railway =

Transport company

The Royal Division of the Aachen-Düsseldorf-Ruhrort Railway (German: Königliche Direction der Aachen-Düsseldorf-Ruhrorter Eisenbahn) was a railway division controlled by the Prussian government that was founded in 1850 and taken over by the Bergisch-Märkische Railway Company in 1862. It was based in Aachen and founded on 4 March 1850, taking over the operation from 1 April 1850 of two railway companies that had been working together since their founding:

- Ruhrort-Crefeld District Gladbach Railway Company (Ruhrort–Crefeld−Kreis Gladbach Eisenbahngesellschaft, RCG), founded in 1844, approved by the Prussian government on 21 August 1846 and granted a concession on 8 January 1847 to build the line from Homberg via Trompet, Uerdingen and Viersen to Gladbach.
- Aachen-Neuß-Düsseldorf Railway Company (Aachen-Neuß-Düsseldorfer Eisenbahngesellschaft), founded in 1846 and granted a concession on 21 August 1846 to build the line from Aachen via Gladbach, Neuss to Düsseldorf.

== Establishment ==
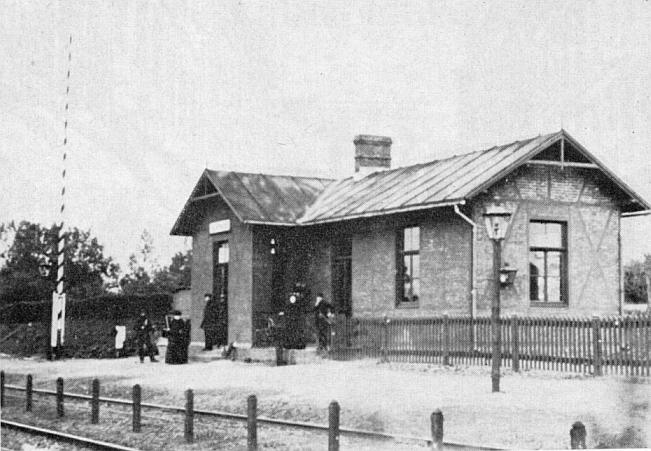
Übach-Palenberg station in 1900

The Ruhrort-Crefeld District Gladbach Railway Company built the Homberg am Rhein via Krefeld to Viersen with a length of 33.6 kilometres and opened it on 15 October 1849. Because of financial difficulties, the company received a government guarantee on its interest payments. Under an agreement of 26 September 1846, it was agreed that the Prussian state would be responsible for both companies in order to promote construction and operation of the railways.

== Construction of lines ==
As of 1 April 1850, the two railway companies came under the management of the Royal Division of the Aachen-Düsseldorf-Ruhrort Railway in Aachen.

Lines were opened as follows:

Section	Length	Opened
Viersen – Gladbach	8.6 km	15 October 1851
Gladbach – Rheydt	3.8 km	12 August 1852
Rheydt – Herzogenrath	44.0 km	12 November 1852
Herzogenrath – Aachen	13,2 km	17 January 1853
Aachen – Germany/Belgium border	2.7 km	23 October 1854
Gladbach – Old Oberkassel	24.2 km	17 January 1853
Old Oberkassel – Rheinstation	0.9 km	16 October 1854

Rheinstation was a freight station only, where goods could be transferred to river boats on the Rhine or loaded on carts to be hauled over the Düsseldorf pontoon bridge, opened in 1839.

The initiative for the railway line came from the industrialists of Krefeld and Mönchengladbach, who intended to give domestic industry cheap access to raw materials from overseas via the port of Antwerp and to cheap supplies of coal from the Ruhr. At the same time the rail links would facilitate the marketing of their products. To avoid the difficult transhipment of goods for the crossing of the Rhine–the military had not allowed the construction of a railway bridge from Ruhrort to Homberg–the Ruhrort-Crefeld District Gladbach Railway Company signed a contract on 29 March 1849 with the Cologne-Minden Railway Company to operate a train ferry for freight wagons and passenger carriages across the river between Ruhrort and Homberg.

The Ruhrort–Homberg train ferry commenced operations on 12 November 1852. Initially carriages were lowered by ropes down a ramp to the non-powered pontoon and raised on the other side with ropes hauled by a locomotive. A steam ship towed coupled pontoons over the river. It was able to transfer up to 700 carriages a month. In 1854, to increase the efficiency of ferry operation, both companies started building lift towers on both banks through which carriages could be hydraulically raised or lowered to the ferries. After the commissioning of the towers on 1 May 1856, the number of carriages that could be handled increased from about 30,000 to 50,000 cars annually.

== Takeover by the Bergisch-Märkische Railway Company ==
With the opening of the Witten/Dortmund–Oberhausen/Duisburg line via Essen in 1862, the Bergisch-Märkische Railway Company gained its own access to the coal mines of the Ruhr and was thus able to offer the only competition to the operations of the Cologne-Minden Railway Company. To export coal towards Belgium, Netherlands and shipping ports it built a connecting line from Mülheim-Styrum to the river port at Ruhrort, which was completed in 1867.

To achieve its broader goals, it turned to the Prussian government for funds to acquire all the available shares of the Royal Division of the Aachen-Düsseldorf-Ruhrort Railway. On 1 January 1866, the Royal Division of the Aachen-Düsseldorf-Ruhrort Railway was merged with the Bergisch-Märkisches Railway Company and, on 8 January 1866, the management of the railway was transferred to the administration of the Bergisch-Märkisches Railway Company in Elberfeld and the administration in Aachen was closed.
