= Düren–Neuss railway =

Railway line in Germany

Coordinates: 51°5′35″N 6°34′50″E

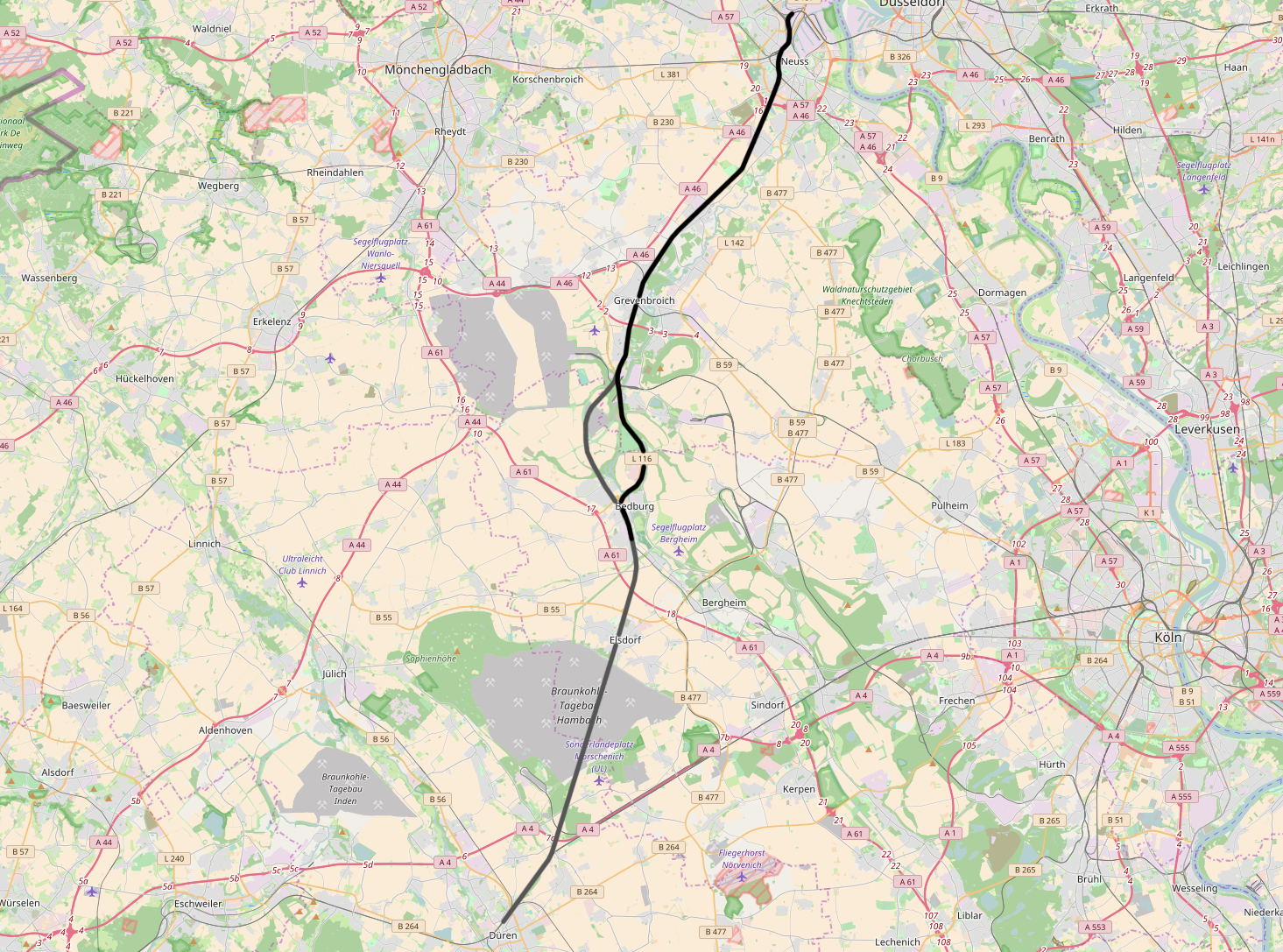

Overview
- Line number: 2580
- Locale: North Rhine-Westphalia, Germany

Service
- Route number: 481

Technical
- Line length: 49.0 km (30.4 mi)
- Number of tracks: 2: Grevenbroich – Holzheim
- Track gauge: 1,435 mm (4 ft 8 1/2 in) standard gauge
- Operating speed: 100 km/h (62 mph)

The Düren–Neuss railway is a line in the German state of North Rhine-Westphalia. The non-electrified main line originally ran from Düren to Neuss, but the Düren–Bedburg section has been closed and dismantled.

== History ==
The Neuss–Duren section was opened on 1 September 1869 by the Rhenish Railway Company (Rheinische Eisenbahn-Gesellschaft, RhE), which was nationalised in 1880. It formed the first cross connection between the two main lines to Aachen from Düsseldorf via Mönchengladbach and from Cologne, as the (Mönchengladbach –) Hochneukirch – Jülich – Stolberg (– Aachen) branch line was opened four years later and the current Mönchengladbach–Cologne main line was opened between 1889 and 1899.

The later emergence of the now more important and electrified Mönchengladbach–Cologne line is also the reason for the location of Grevenbroich station, which was initially built on the north-south running Neuss–Düren line. This meant that east-west running Mönchengladbach–Cologne line had to be built to the station on a large S-curve.

Even before the Second World War, about half of all trains on the Düren–Neuss line continued to and from Düsseldorf Hbf. A few trains at that time began in Grevenbroich or Gustorf. A pair of Sunday excursion trains running between Düsseldorf and Heimbach (Eifel) passed through some of the smaller stations without stopping.

On the morning of 5 September 1937, a serious railway accident occurred in Holzheim station: a special train running from Rommerskirchen with 800 pilgrims on pilgrimage to Kevelaer was derailed. 17 people died and 18 people were seriously injured.

=== Timetable changes in the postwar period ===
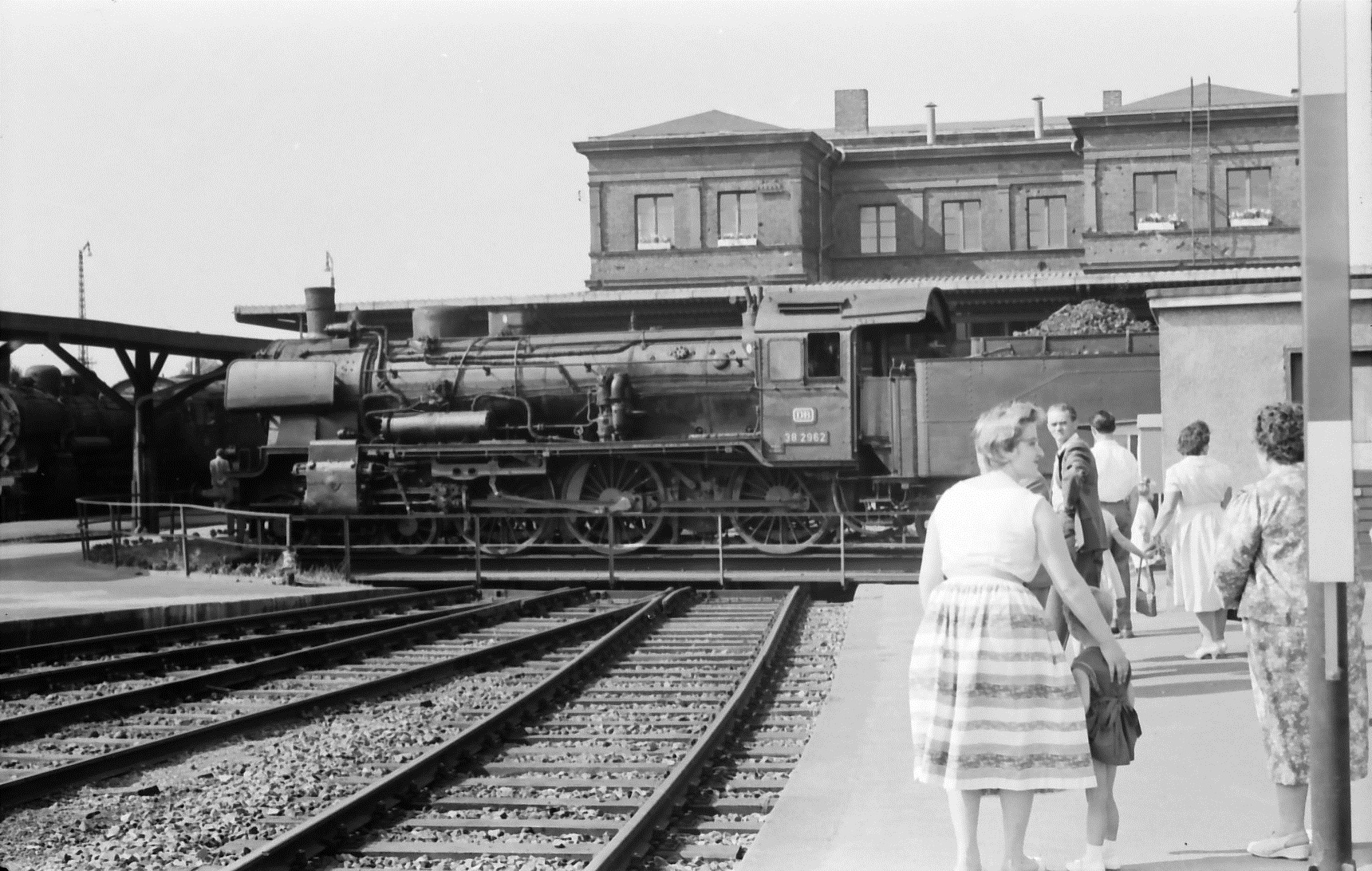
1965 in Düren station: the trains from Neuss usually ended on platform tracks 17 or 19 and the steam locomotives were rotated and rearranged on the adjacent turntable.

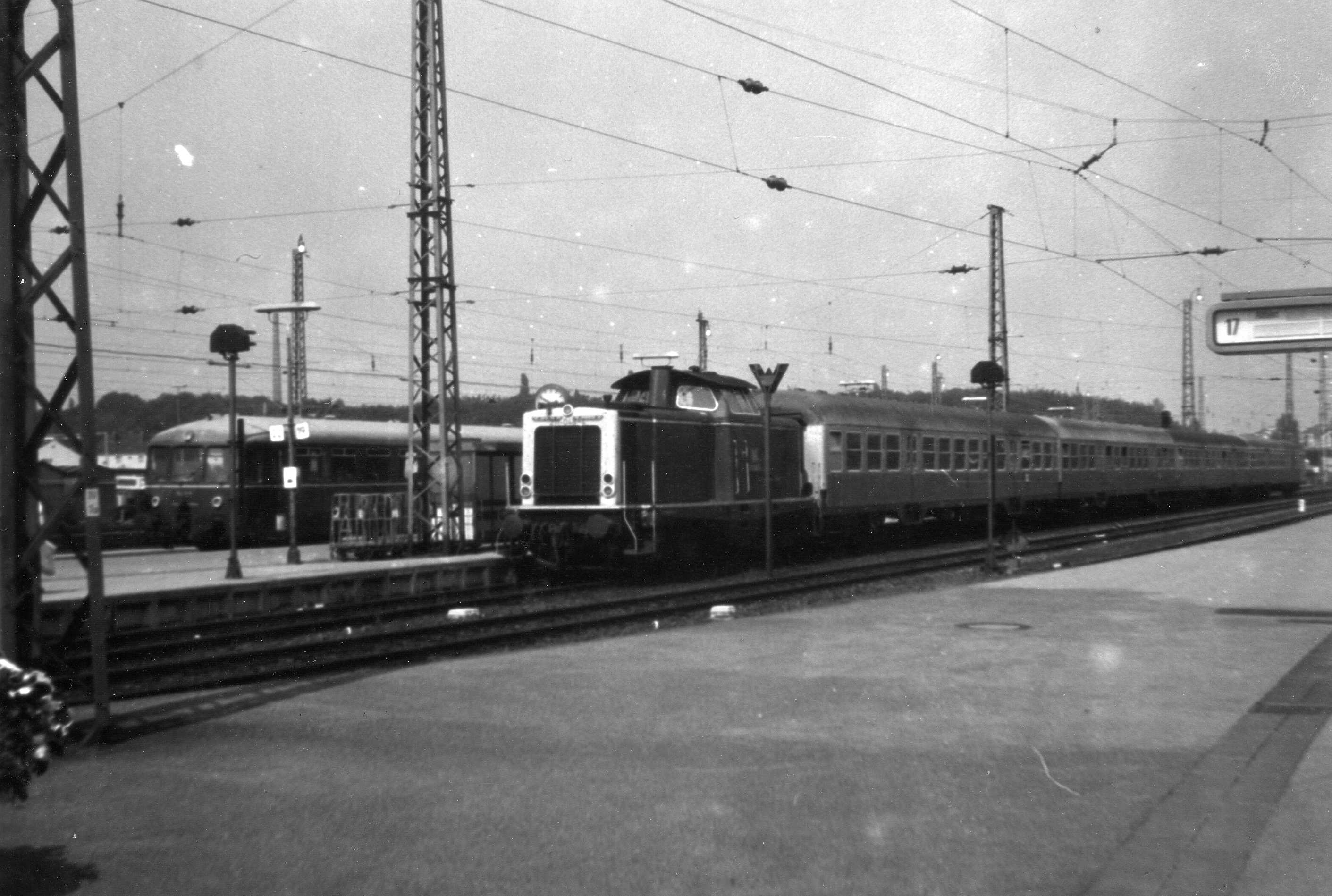
Düren station in August 1981: on track 19 is a diesel locomotive hauling train N 8124 from Neuss, which will return a few minutes later with a driving trailer as N 8125 to Düsseldorf. On the left, a battery-powered railcar is running on track 22 as the Nt 8072 from Jülich.

After the Second World War, the rail service, which had been greatly reduced by the effects of the war, was successively rebuilt and upgraded. Thus, in the winter timetable 1952/53, there were two through trains from Jülich to Neuss, using the Bedburg–Ameln railway, in the morning. In the 1950s, the number of trains running from/to Düsseldorf also increased. Passenger services were abandoned on the branch from Bedburg to Ameln in 1953 and Sunday passenger services were abandoned on the Erft Railway from Bedburg via Bergheim to Horrem in 1963. However, due to the very limited interdependence of rail traffic on the Düren–Neuss line and the Erft Railway, this had practically no effect.

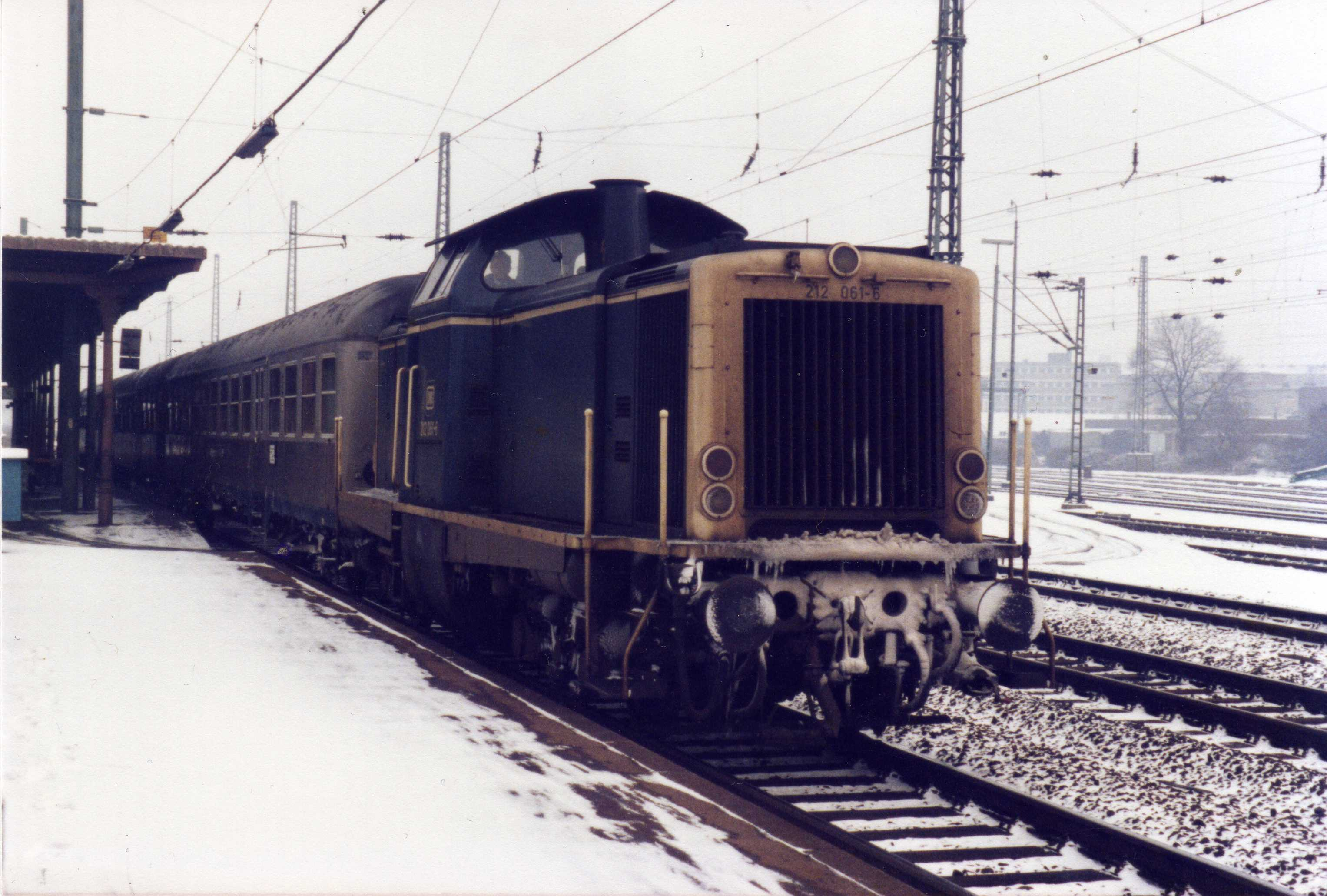
The through trains from Düsseldorf to Heimbach stopped in Düren on track 1 (here N 8120 at noon on 6 February 1986) or track 21

At the beginning of the 1950s, the new Deutsche Bundesbahn (DB) established the so-called Städteschnellverkehr (city express, S-Zug) semi-fast services on many routes, mainly serving local and regional traffic. These were not successful everywhere. For example, a pair of S-Zug services between Stolberg-Hammer (Altstadt) and Mönchengladbach via Jülich was cancelled in May 1952. Also a pair of S-Zug services ran between Düren and Düsseldorf on weekday mornings and evenings, stopping only in Elsdorf, Bedburg, Grevenbroich and Neuss. This also soon disappeared from the timetable, while the service from Aachen to Bonn via Düren and Euskirchen, later ran for two decades as an Eilzug (semi-fast) service. However, on the Düren–Neuss route there were occasional semi-fast trains from year to year that did not stop at all stations. Often, however, they only operated as semi-fast trains on parts of the route, for instance between Düren and Grevenbroich, so that in practice only the two stops between Bedburg and Grevenbroich were omitted. Most of the semi-fast trains stopped in Elsdorf. The main purpose of skipping stations was clearly no longer to achieve shorter travel times, but to allow trains to run over a particular section of single-track line quickly enough that the trains running in the opposite direction before and after them were hindered as little as possible. As a rule, over the years not more than three trains per day and direction ran as (partial) semi-fast trains and the last semi-fast train ran on this line on 22 May 1982.

In the 1960s, during several timetable periods a motorail train ran with sleeping and couchette cars from Avignon to Düsseldorf and return over the Düren–Neuss line on Saturdays in the summer months. Since this train could only stop at car loading stations—so not between Düsseldorf and Aachen—and since neither the main line via Cologne nor the line via Mönchengladbach were electrified until 1966, this was hauled by a fast class 03 steam locomotive over the less congested line via Bedburg, which had been developed for operations at 100 km/h or more, which corresponded approximately at that time to the permissible maximum speed for car-carrying trains.

A direct afternoon commuter service from Neuss via Düren to Aachen was also added in the 1960s, but this disappeared a few years later. However, a direct Düsseldorf–Heimbach service on Sundays continued throughout this period. Apart from these exceptions, passenger traffic did not extend significantly beyond the core Düren–Düsseldorf route until the 1970s.

Until 1976, the line followed another route between Gustorf and Bedburg; this section included the stations of Harff and Kaster, which was only opened in 1971. As a result of the mining of lignite (brown coal) by Rheinbraun AG (now part of RWE) at Harff, the line was removed for the expansion of an open-cast mine. The railway line was relocated between Gustorf and Bedburg with a crossing loop at Neurath. About 20 years later, Deutsche Bahn dismantled the loop at Neurath in 1995, as it was no longer necessary for train services. It is intended to return the line to the old route after the exhaustion of the open-cast mine to reconnect Kaster with the railway. However, this has not been implemented to date.

In the 1970s and 1980s, the number of trains to and from Heimbach trains steadily increased and almost all trains ran to and from Düsseldorf and few trains ended in Neuss. In the summer timetable 1981, for example, 15 trains ran from Düren to Düsseldorf from Monday to Friday, two from Düren to Neuss, two from Grevenbroich to Düsseldorf and one from Bedburg to Neuss. Services continuing on the Erft Railway were very rare until 1988. Apart from the services to/from Heimbach, there were some rather short-lived services on other routes in the early 1980s. Thus, in the summer of 1980, an afternoon train was inserted from Düren via Grevenbroich to Mönchengladbach, apparently as a replacement for the trains from Düren via Jülich to Mönchengladbach, which could no longer operate due to the decommissioning of the Jülich–Hochneukirch section. For several years there was an early morning train from Grevenbroich to Wuppertal-Wichlinghausen (from 1983 to Krefeld). The longest regional service was a morning train from Düren via Düsseldorf, Dorsten and Coesfeld to Rheine that ran from June 1980 to May 1982 and was operated with a class VT 24 set, which was very unusual in the area of the cities of Cologne, Düsseldorf and Aachen, but many sets of this class were stationed in Westphalia. In the mid-1980s, these connections were decreased again, with only a few services passing on to the Erft Railway and a few more running to Heimbach. In the 1987/88 timetable two trains ran from Düsseldorf to Heimbach each day and four from Heimbach to Düsseldorf, with one more of each on Saturdays.

=== Decline of the Düren–Bedburg section ===
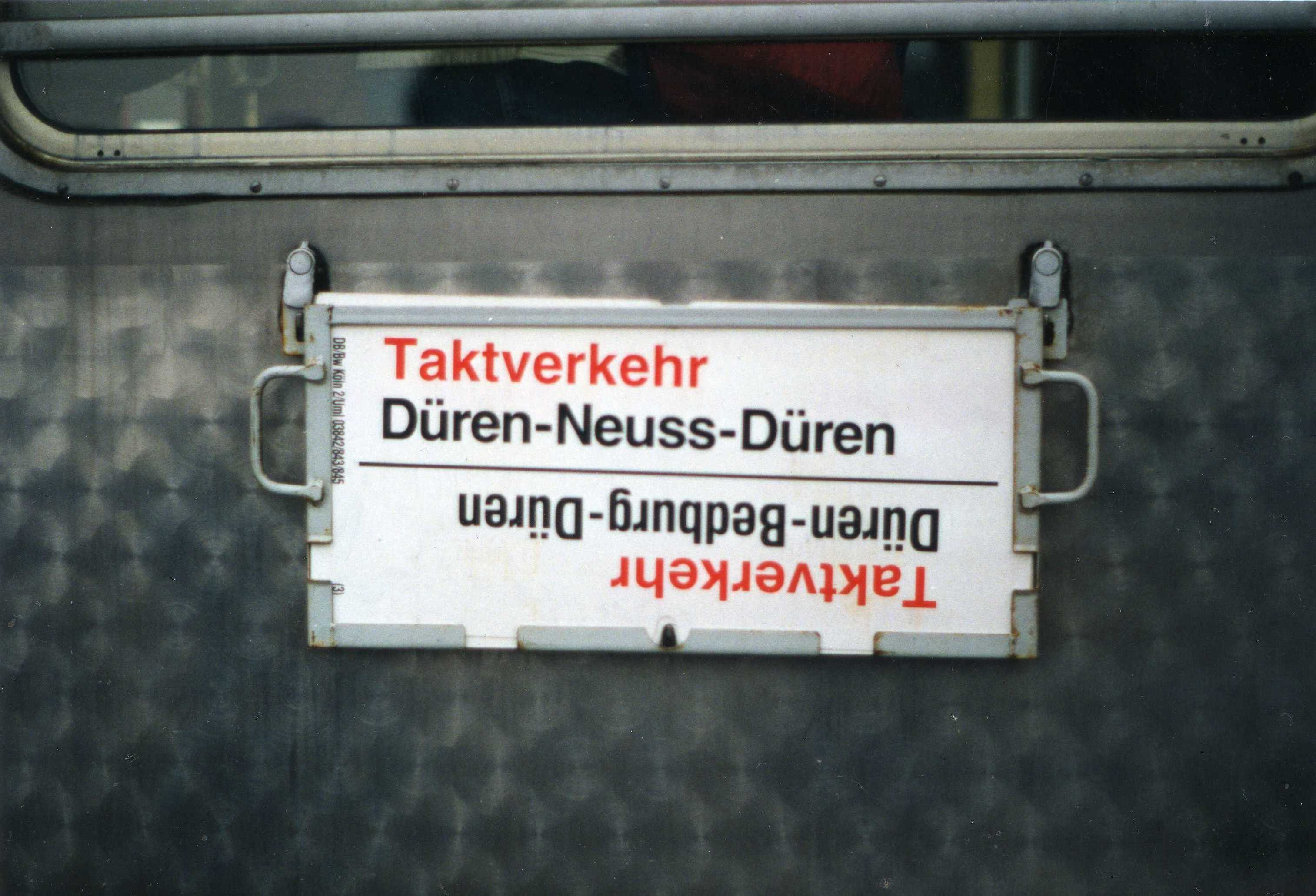
Train service notice on a Silberling carriage, which ran between Düren and Bedburg or Neuss until 1995

With the commissioning of the so-called east-west S-Bahn (S 8) on 29 May 1988, the timetable concept of the Düren–Neuss line was modified. The new S-Bahn line between Mönchengladbach, Neuss, Düsseldorf and Hagen ran every 20 minutes and replaced commuter services on many sections. Therefore, most Düren–Düsseldorf services were shortened to the Düren–Neuss route. In addition, a regular interval timetable was established on the remaining Düren–Neuss section. At the time, this was a rare exception in regional transport, since before 1991 Deutsche Bundesbahn operated few services at regular intervals except on S-Bahn networks and Intercity services.

Because services every 20 minutes from Neuss towards Düren would have been excessive, only every second S-Bahn service was met by a connecting train, so a 40-minute service was operated between Neuss and Grevenbroich. Only every second train continued to Düren, so that a service ran every 80 minutes between Grevenbroich and Düren, which was not very useful for passengers. During the morning peak hour there were some deviations from the regular interval pattern and some additional services. During the afternoon peak hour, the 80-minute service was reinforced between Bedburg and Neuss to provide a 40-minute cycle. The end of the Düren–Bedburg section was approaching, as the redevelopment of the line in the next seven years was foreseen as a result of the expansion of the Hambach surface mine, which was approved in the 1970s. On Sundays, the entire line was served every two hours. In addition, in 1988, some direct connections were restored from Horrem to Neuss in the peak hour. Through trains continued to run to and from Heimbach, but less than before and mostly only to/from Neuss instead of to/from Düsseldorf. Their numbers continued to decline over the next few years; the 1990/91 timetable only listed one daily direct connection to Heimbach and two return services, with three on Saturdays in both directions.

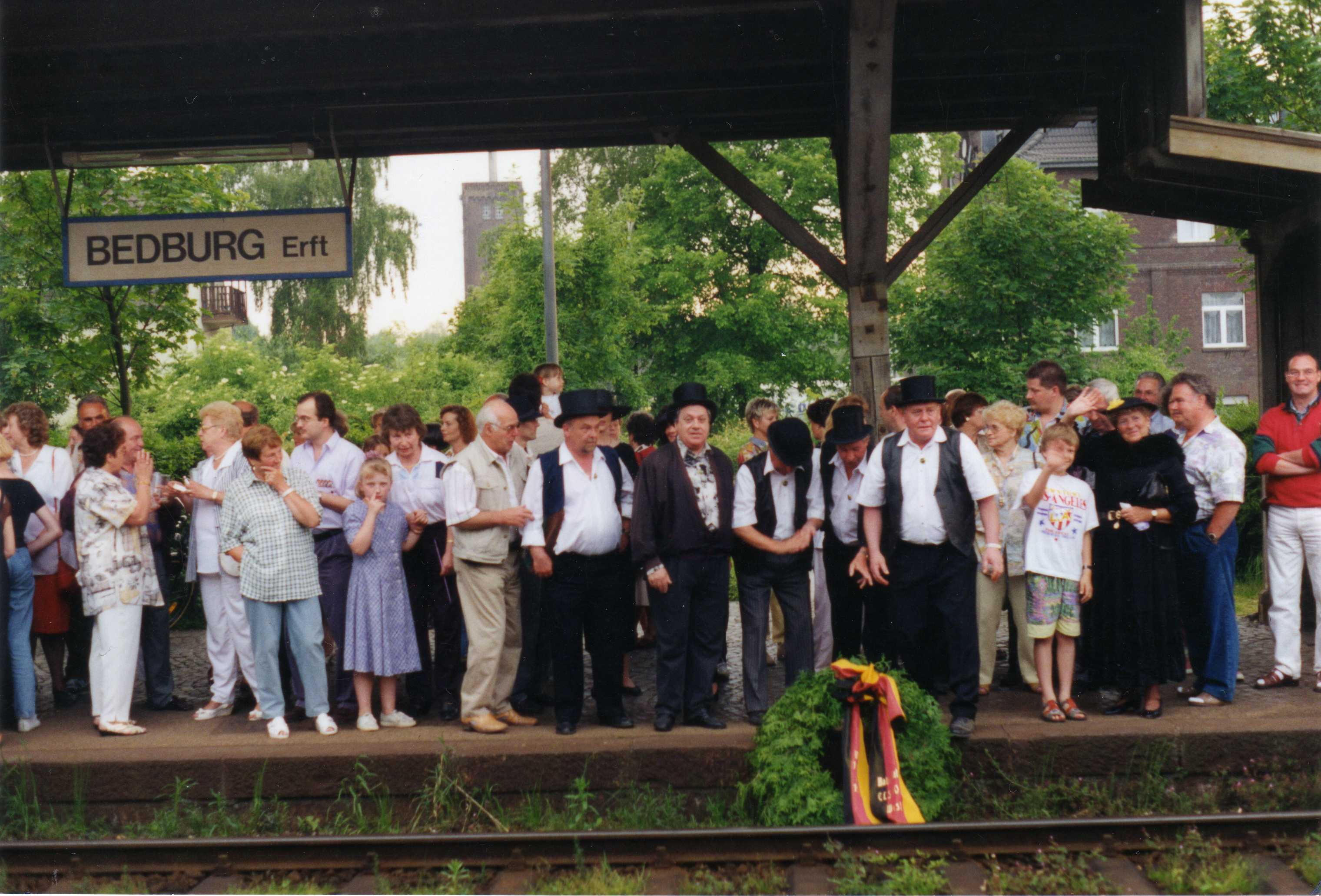
The platform in Bedburg before the departure of the last passenger train to Düren on 27 May 1995

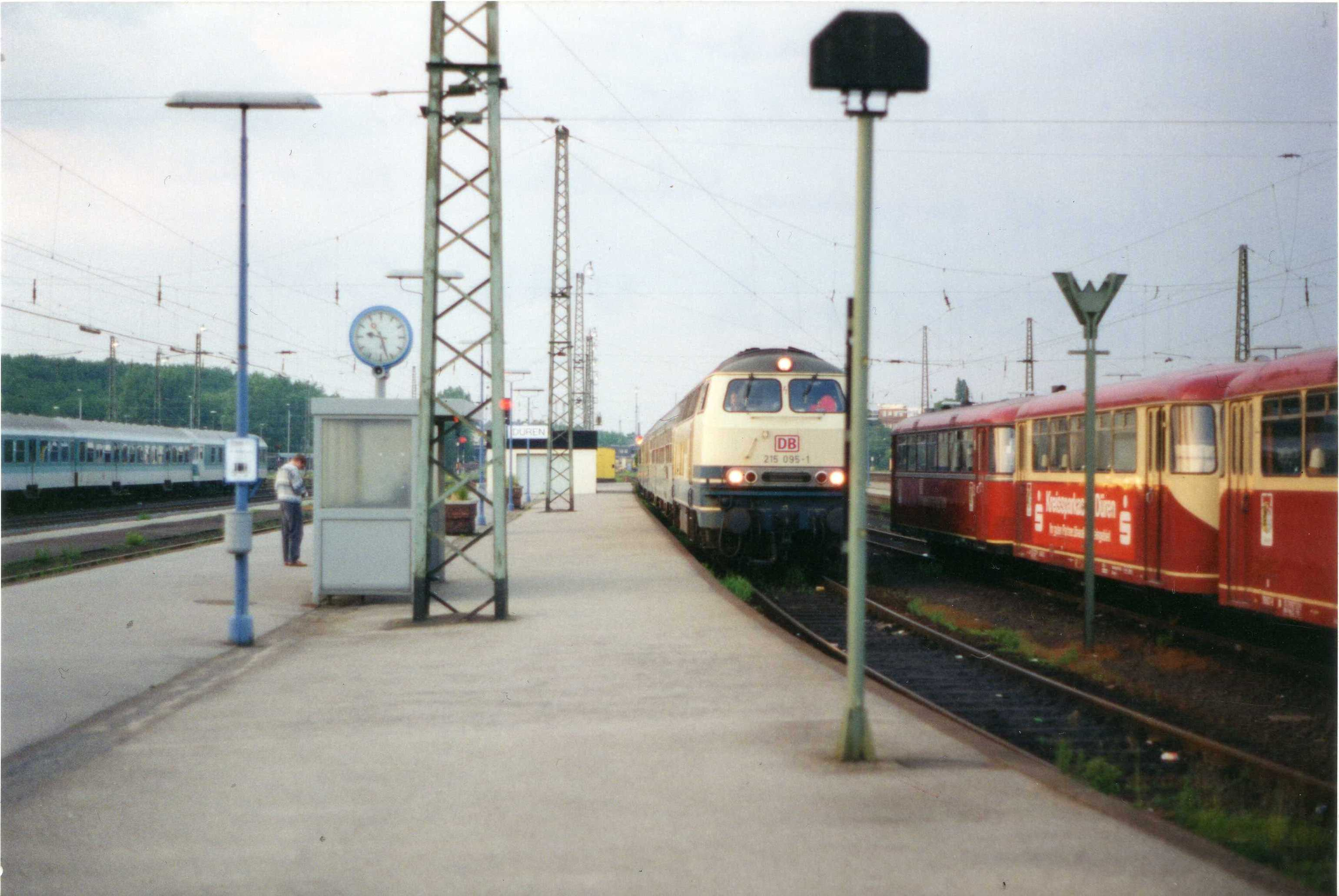
At 21:22 the last passenger train from Bedburg in Düren arrived on track 19: N 8486 from Neuss hauled by locomotive 215 095-1

On 2 June 1991, when DB introduced regular-interval services for regional services, the operating concept of the Düren–Neuss line was fundamentally changed. The trains now ran every hour on the whole line from Neuss to Horrem, but only on weekdays, as there had been no service from Saturday afternoon on the Erft Railway for nearly three decades. Additional services ran between Neuss and Grevenbroich on weekdays providing a service with intervals alternating between 20 and 40 minutes, services ran on the Erft Railway mostly at half-hourly intervals, and the previously prevailing break from 9:00 to 12:00 was abolished. As a result of this changeover, the intermediate stations north of Bedburg were given a much improved connection to Cologne. Since Cologne is not only larger than Aachen, but also closer to these stations, additional traffic was expected compared to the previous orientation to Düren and Aachen. In addition, of course, there would be improved connections from the Erft Railway to the commuter destination of Düsseldorf.

The disadvantage of these changes was that there were no longer any through services towards Heimbach. In addition, the Bedburg–Düren section was operated only as isolated shuttle service, although now it ran every hour, even on Sundays. Compared to the hourly express train service (Aachen –) Düren – Cologne – Düsseldorf (– Dortmund)—now the RE 1 Regional-Express service—established in 1991, the direct connection from Düren to Dusseldorf via Bedburg and Neuss was completely unattractive because of the need to change trains twice. To make matters worse, the connections in Bedburg were only convenient in one direction due to scheduling constraints, in the morning from Düren to Neuss and in the afternoon in the opposite direction; otherwise the wait to change trains in Bedburg was over 30 minutes.

This situation was improved on 31 May 1992: direct trains between Düren and Neuss were restored on Saturday afternoons and Sundays. On weekdays, however, the situation described above regarding transfers in Bedburg remained. The Düren–Bedburg line was thus one of the few that remained in operation until its closure at all times and on all days of the week. Direct weekend connections to Heimbach were not reintroduced, especially since the operation of the Düren–Heimbach railway was transferred to the Dürener Kreisbahn in May 1993.

On the evening of 27 May 1995, passenger services were discontinued on the Bedburg–Duren section. The following day, after 32 years, the Sunday operation on the Erft Railway between Bedburg and Horrem resumed. While the last train passed through Bedburg and Elsdorf with public commemorations, speakers and with great expressions of emotions by the population and thus was delayed by 27 minutes, little notice of this event was taken in Düren. The platform loudspeaker announced curtly: "Düren, hier Bahnhof Düren, Gleis 19. Verspätet eingefahrener Nahverkehrszug endet hier" (Düren, here at Düren station, track 19. Late delayed commuter train ends here).

On 31 December 1995, freight operations ended on the section. The line was closed on 2 June 1996. The Düren–Elsdorf section was located in the area of today's Hambach open pit mine and was subsequently dredged for lignite. The Elsdorf–Bedburg section was initially used for freight traffic, but it was later shut down due to lack of demand and dismantled.

=== Recent developments ===
The rail service was extended throughout the day to Cologne from 15 December 2002.

In March 2006, the line was between Grevenbroich and Neuss-Holzheim was converted to the new Ks-signals, controlled from the electronic signalling centre in Duisburg. On 1 November 2007, the rest of the line was also connected to the electronic signalling centre. At the same time, all older level crossings were upgraded to the state of the art with flashing lights. The crossing at Bahnhofstraße in Holzheim had been equipped with a full barrier and a gatekeeper who visually checked whether the tracks were free of vehicles; this is now done with a radar scanner.

== Operations ==
=== Düssel-Erft-Bahn ===
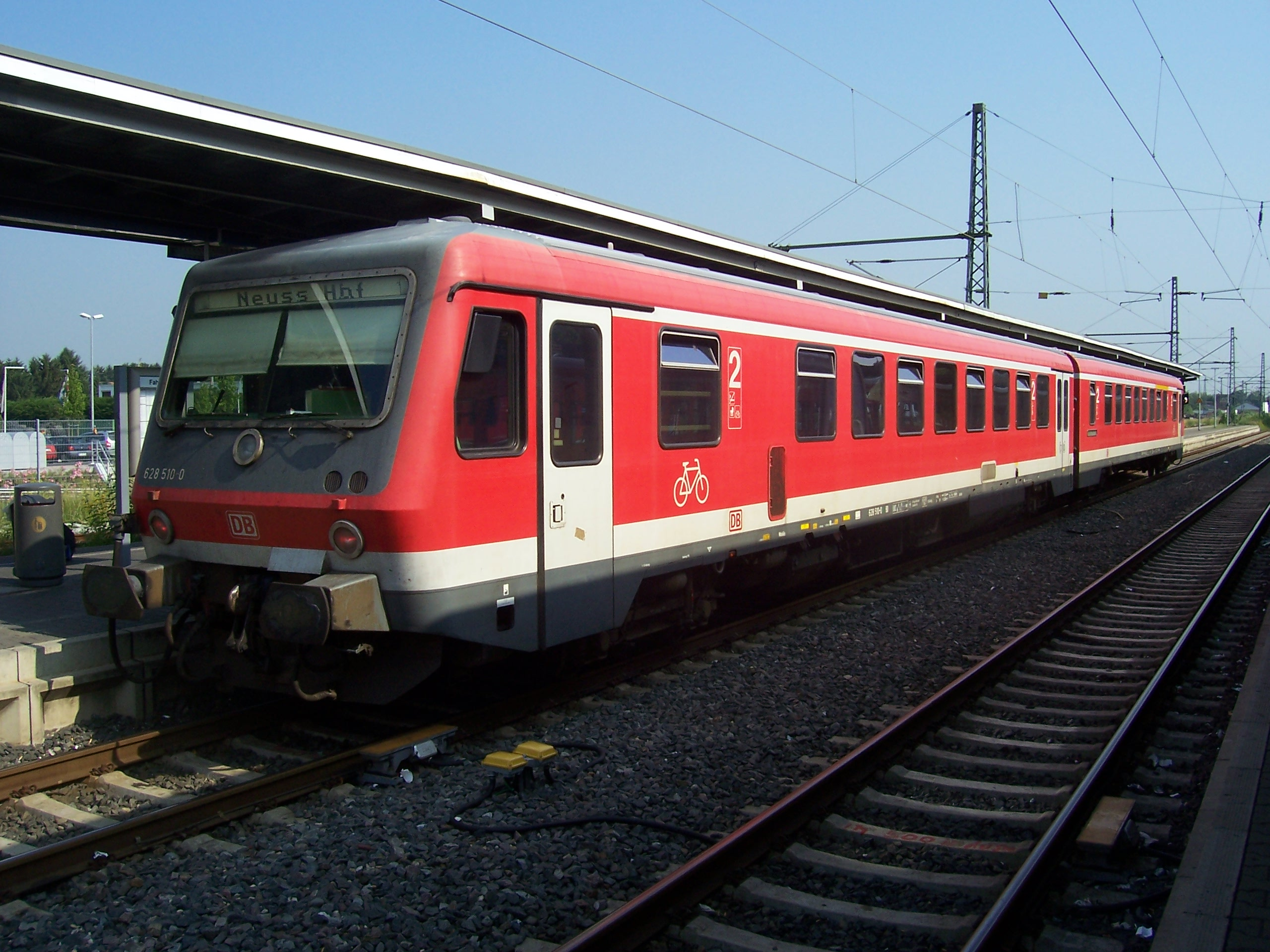
A class 628 set operating an Erft-Bahn service in Grevenbroich station

The Regionalbahn RB 39 (Düssel-Erft-Bahn, "Düssel-Erft railway", referring to the Düssel and Erft rivers at each end of the route) service runs from Düsseldorf Hauptbahnhof via Neuss Hauptbahnhof to Bedburg. Beyond the Düren–Neuss railway, the Düssel-Erft-Bahn runs between Neuss and Düsseldorf on the Mönchengladbach–Düsseldorf railway. It is operated by the private transport company VIAS every half hour between Neuss and Grevenbroich, as well as every hour over the whole line.

Until the timetable change on 10 December 2017, the RB 38 (Erft-Bahn) operated from Düsseldorf Hauptbahnhof or Neuss (on weekends) via Bedburg to Köln Messe/Deutz. This service, which is located in the area served by the Verkehrsverbund Rhein-Sieg (Rhine-Sieg Transport association), was shortened to the Bedburg–Cologne section at the timetable change. Passengers wishing to travel beyond Bedburg now have to transfer there. The reason for this division are plans of the authority that is responsible for rail services south of Bedburg, the Zweckverband Nahverkehr Rheinland (Rhineland local transport association), to electrify the Bedburg–Cologne section and operate it as an S-Bahn service. Furthermore, first class has been dropped on the Erft-Bahn service, because of its low use and because trains are always crowded during the peak hour.

=== Freight traffic ===
At the northern end of the Gustorf station, there is a connection to the extensive factory railway network of RWE Power AG (formerly Rheinbraun). Illustrated timetables of the 1980s show regular freight trains, which pass from the DB network to the Rheinbraun network and vice versa, both towards Neuss and Düren. Even today, Neusser Eisenbahn trains run between Neuss and Gustorf carrying gypsum, lime or brown coal dust to/from RWE power stations for supply and disposal. In addition DB Cargo, serves a customer in Holzheim from Neuss freight yard.

From the mid-1970s to May 1988, an ore train weighing over 1000 tonnes ran several times a week from Neuss-Hessentor (Rheinhafen) via Bedburg, Düren and Stolberg to Weisweiler (to the smelter of the Gesellschaft für Elektrometallurgie), but in some years took the detour via Cologne-Ehrenfeld, because the train could then be largely electrically hauled. Until the mid-1970s, this train usually took the shortest route over the Mönchengladbach–Stolberg railway, which was closed in 1980. Furthermore, at least until the mid-1990s local freight traffic was handled by so-called goods exchange trains. Until the early 1970s, there was also a 1400-ton freight train (Dg 7866) from Brunswick via Neuss to Elsdorf, apparently running to the local sugar factory.

=== Rolling stock ===
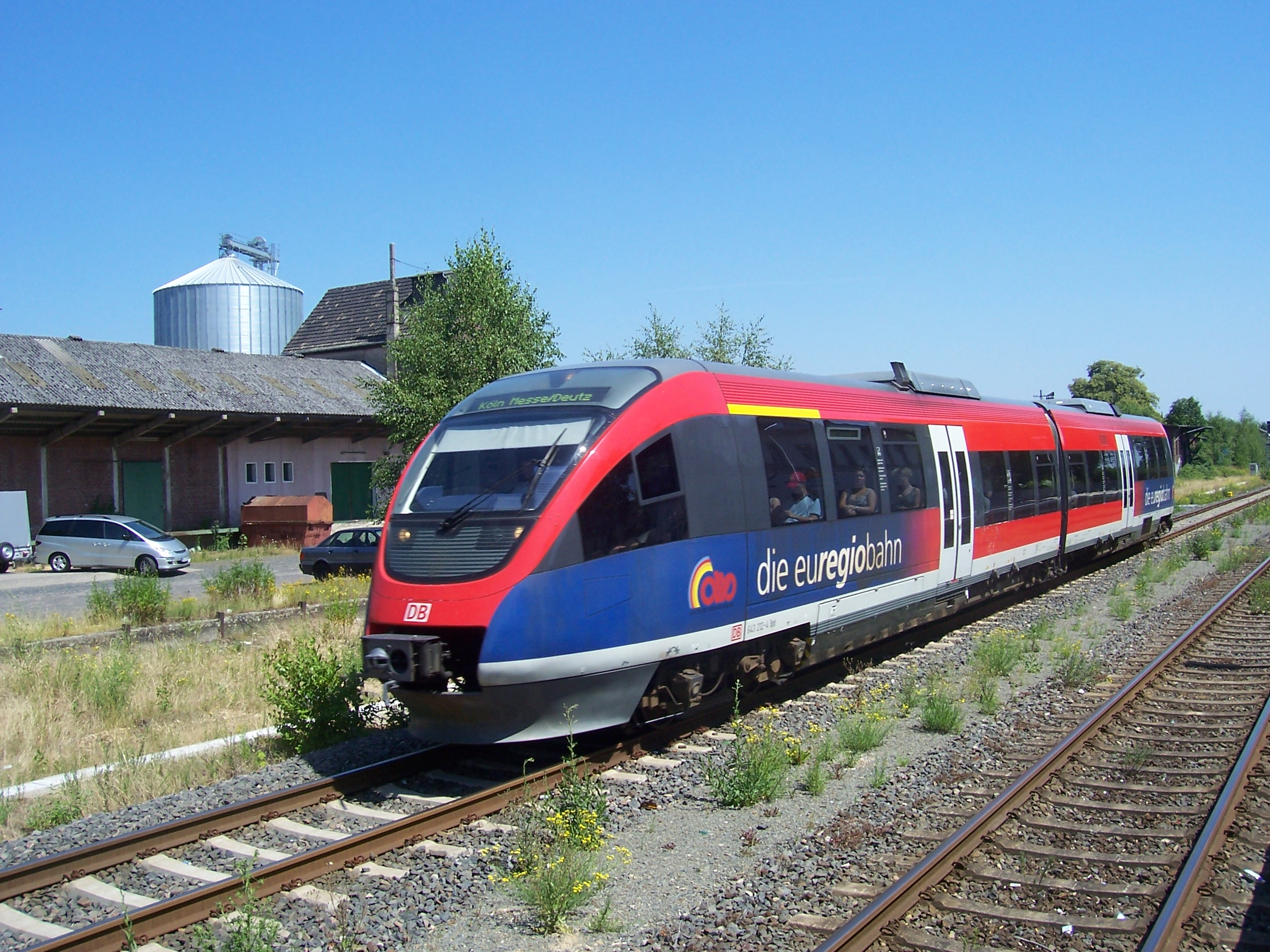
euregiobahn-Talent in Kapellen-Wevelinghoven

After the end of the steam era—which in the area of the Bundesbahndirektion Köln (Railway division of Cologne) was marked by a steam locomotive farewell party at Stolberg depot on 3/4 April 1976—depending on the load of the trains, the freight traffic was usually hauled by diesel locomotives of classes 211 and 215, more rarely also 260 and 290. Passenger traffic had already been completely converted to modern types of traction a few years earlier, and in the 1970s and 1980s, it was served by class 211 diesel locomotives, class 515 accumulator cars and, to some extent, single-engine class 795 Uerdingen railbuses. However, since the trains became fuller as they approached Dusseldorf, the short railbuses were only suitable for low traffic periods. Of the 18 trains leaving Düren towards Neuss from Monday to Friday in the winter 1977/78 timetable, eleven trains were locomotive-hauled, five consisted of accumulator cars and two were railbuses; this distribution was typical of the 1970s.

Until about 1980, the diesel locomotives also hauled rebuilt coaches (Umbau-Wagen) from the post-war period. These trains had no control cars, so the locomotive had to be run around and reattached at each change of direction. After their withdrawal, the locomotive-hauled trains consisted only of Silberling coaches, usually with a control car. The shunting at the end of trips also involved the single-engine railbuses, which had trailers that could not run at the head of the train because they lacked cabs. The railbuses were replaced by other rolling stock in all of North Rhine-Westphalia to the west of the Rhine at the change to the summer 1978 timetable. Only two accumulator cars ran from Düren towards Neuss in the summer of 1978; all other trains were locomotive-hauled. The same applied in the following timetable periods up to and including the summer of 1980. In the winter timetable of 1980/81, however, suddenly 13 out of 17 trains were designated as railcars (including accumulator cars), but in the summer of 1981 and the winter of 1981/82 only one of 17 trains was not locomotive-hauled. From 1982, railcars were no longer marked as such in the timetable, but accumulator cars were used on the line until at least 1993.

In the 1990s, class 212 diesel locomotives and later class 215 and 218 locomotives were used together with Silberling carriages. In the late 1990s, the locomotive-hauled trains were replaced with class 628 diesel multiple units. In 2003, two and three carriage class 643 (Bombardier Talent) diesel multiple units was added, so that both vehicle classes were used until the timetable change of 2010/2011.

Currently RB 38 services are operated exclusively with class 628 diesel multiple units, mostly as coupled sets with four carriages. Single class 628 sets (two carriages) are used on the short shuttles between Düsseldorf/Neuss and Grevenbroich.

=== Outlook ===
In the 1990s, it was planned (as part of a network targeted for 2015) to extend the Rhine-Ruhr S-Bahn network from Horrem via Bedburg to Düsseldorf as line S 18. This meant that the line would be upgraded and electrified. Two new stations were planned at Neuss Polizeidirektion and Neuss Insel Hombroich.

The plans for the extension of the S-Bahn on the northern section of the line have not been pursued further by the Verkehrsverbund Rhein-Ruhr (VRR). The Zweckverband Nahverkehr Rheinland (NVR), which is responsible for the southern section and the connecting Erft Railway, is planning to operate the S 12 from Horrem via the Erft Railway to Bedburg. Since the timetable change in December 2017, the new RB 39 service has been running from Neuss in Bedburg. The RB 38 service continues to run between Cologne and Bedburg. Subject to an agreement with the VRR, the S-Bahn will later replace the Regionalbahn service to Grevenbroich.

The line from Bedburg to Elsdorf was finally abandoned as the result of a study. This assumed that the line would be served by 18 trains per direction each day and that the underlying cost for the reactivation of the existing line was estimated to be €12 million. The last passenger service ran on this section of the line in 1995 and the last freight train ran in 1996. Another issue is the low number of passengers (490) estimated to use it.

== Route ==
The line from Bedburg to Neuss Hauptbahnhof (main station) runs next to the Erft. The railway crosses the Erft twice between Bedburg and Gustorf. Over the Gustorf–Bedburg section, it flows over a longer distance almost parallel to the railway line. The line is mainly single track; it has two tracks only between Grevenbroich and Holzheim. From the crossing of the A57 autobahn, the line is single track again until shortly before Neuss station. In Grevenbroich station it crosses the Cologne–Mönchengladbach railway.

=== Düren station ===
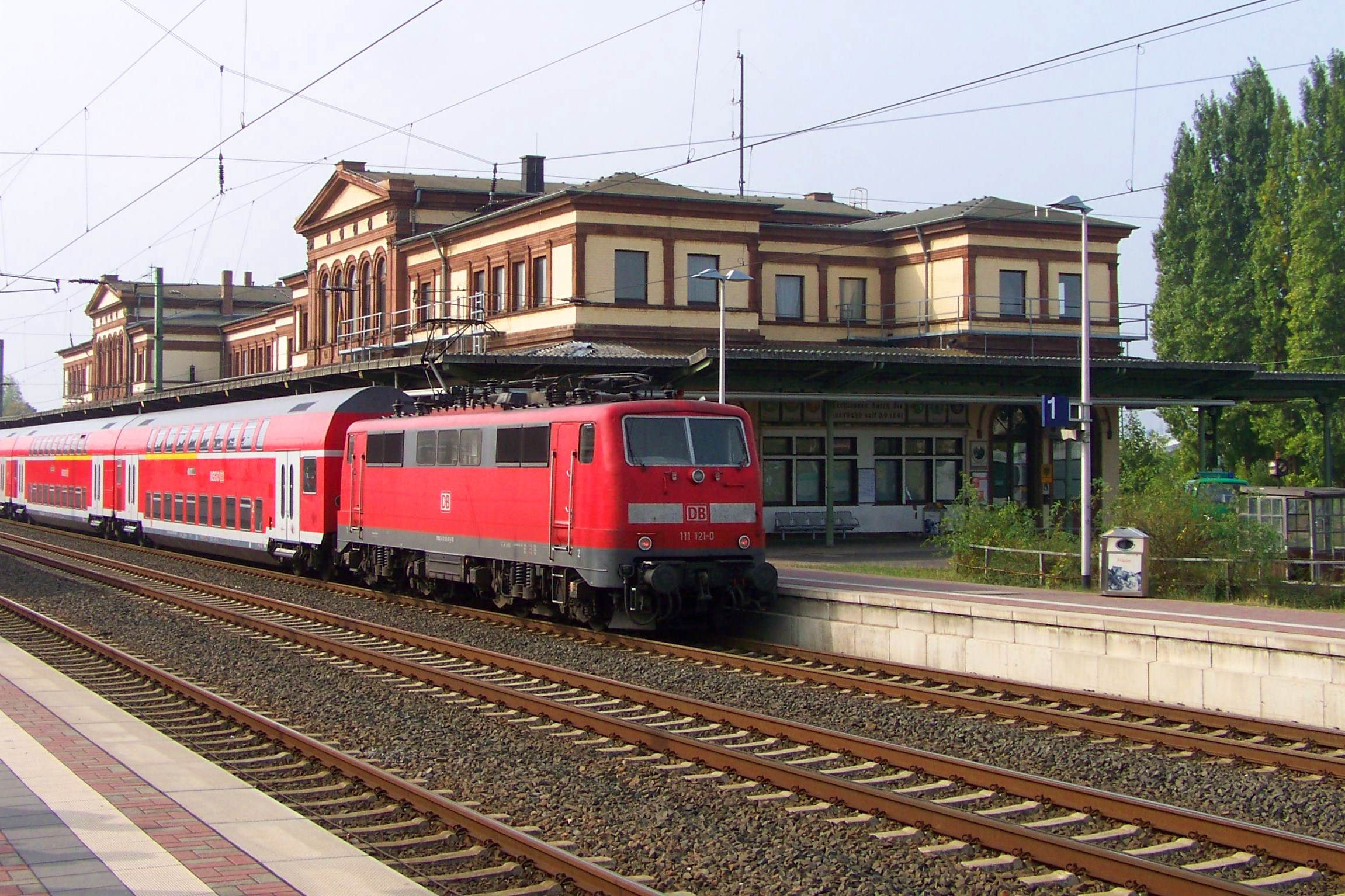
Regional-Express service on track 1 in Düren, on the right is the turntable, before which most of the trains from Bedburg ended

Düren has been connected to the railway network since 1841 via the Cologne–Aachen railway. The station was once the starting point for state railway lines running in a total of six directions and also had a track used only for freight trains and operational traffic to the central workshop of the Düren District Railway (Dürener Kreisbahn) in Distelrath. In addition until 1965, the tram lines of the private metre-gauge Dürener Eisenbahn AG ran towards Inden and until 1944 the district's own standard gauge railway, the Dürener Kreisbahn, ran towards the city centre and the south/southeast. In 1983, Deutsche Bundesbahn abandoned passenger services to Euskirchen. The lines to Jülich and Heimbach were also to be closed, but this was prevented by the Düren District in 1993, which took them over.

Today in Düren there are connections to the lines towards Aachen and Cologne as well as the Rurtalbahn (RB 21) to Jülich / Linnich and Heimbach, which are now used extensively in both commuter and leisure traffic. There are no longer any direct services from Linnich to Heimbach. In addition, the Börde Railway towards Euskirchen is used by passenger traffic on the weekend and regularly by freight traffic to Zülpich. From the junction next to Düren station, there is an access track to the workshop of the Düren–Distelrath railway (Rurtalbahn), which runs to Distelrath.

Until the closure of the railway from Düren to Bedburg via Elsdorf in 1995, the trains to Bedburg or Neuss or Dusseldorf mostly stopped at platforms 19 or 17, which ended in a turntable directly in front of the entrance building. The intervening track 18 served as a bypass track to allow the locomotives of incoming trains and rail buses to run around. Tracks 17 to 19 no longer exist, but their former location can be well recognised by the surrounding and still existing platforms of tracks 1 and 22 and the heritage-listed turntable.

Directly next to the station is the central bus station (ZOB), which is along with Kaiserplatz at the town hall an important hub for the approximately 40 municipal and regional bus routes operated by Dürener Kreisbahn and BVR Busverkehr Rheinland.

=== Etzweiler freight yard ===
The only striking intermediate point on the approximately 15-kilometer-long line between Elsdorf and Düren was the station of Etzweiler on the eastern edge of the so-called Hambach Forest (Bürgewald) (at line-kilometre 11.2). This was once a station with a signal box, two passing tracks and a siding to the lignite mine at Morschenich, not to be confused with the block post of Morschenich, which is 6 km away. Etzweiler station was only used for freight to the Union 103 colliery, which was once the largest underground lignite mine in the world, but was closed in 1955. Passenger trains never stopped there. In the 1980s, the station was rebuilt as a block post. Etzweiler was meanwhile relocated to Neu-Etzweiler near Elsdorf and the old town was dredged as part of the Hambach surface mine.

=== Elsdorf (West) station ===
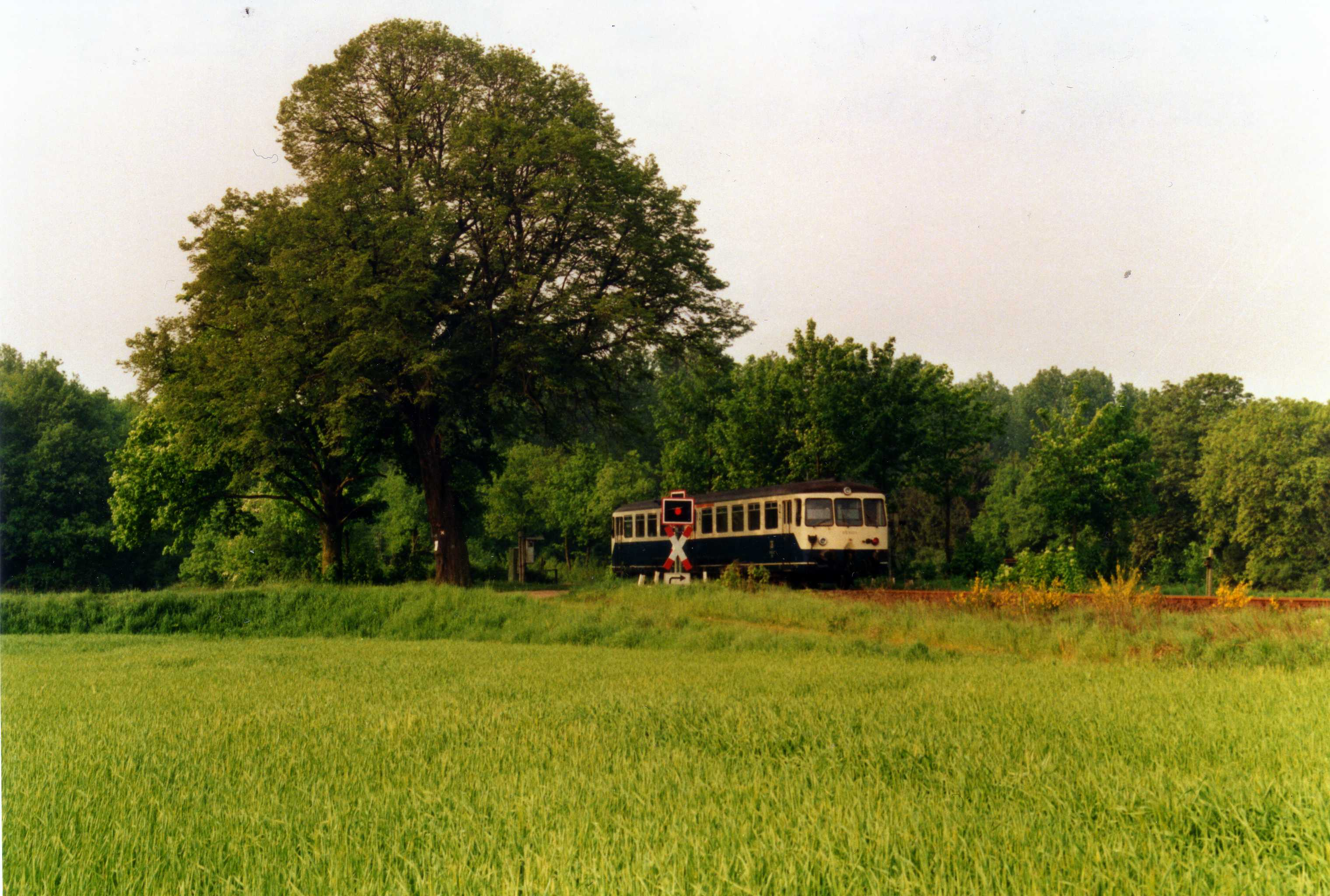
Class 515 between Düren and Elsdorf

Elsdorf (Rhld)—short for Rhineland—station (meaning at line-kilometre 14.9 of the Düren–Neuss line was referred to in the timetables of the 1970s as Elsdorf (Rhld) West, as the town had another station, Elsdorf (Rhld) Ost (east), from which passenger trains ran to Bergheim (Erft) until 1961 and freight trains until 1967. In the 1980s, the entrance building of Elsdorf (West) was demolished together with signal box “Ent” on Köln-Aachener Straße and was replaced by a small shelter. From 27 May 1995 the passenger traffic was discontinued in the Düren–Bedburg section, on 31 December of the same year, the freight traffic. The line was closed permanently on 2 June 1996. The Düren–Elsdorf section was in the area of today's Hambach lignite mine and was therefore dredged. The Elsdorf–Bedburg section was initially still used for freight, bit it later closed due to lack of demand and dismantled. The site of the station is now a parking area. The former route through Elsdorf is now dismantled and will in future be converted into a park for cyclists and walkers. Part of the line became the property of the Elsdorf sugar factory.

=== Bedburg station ===
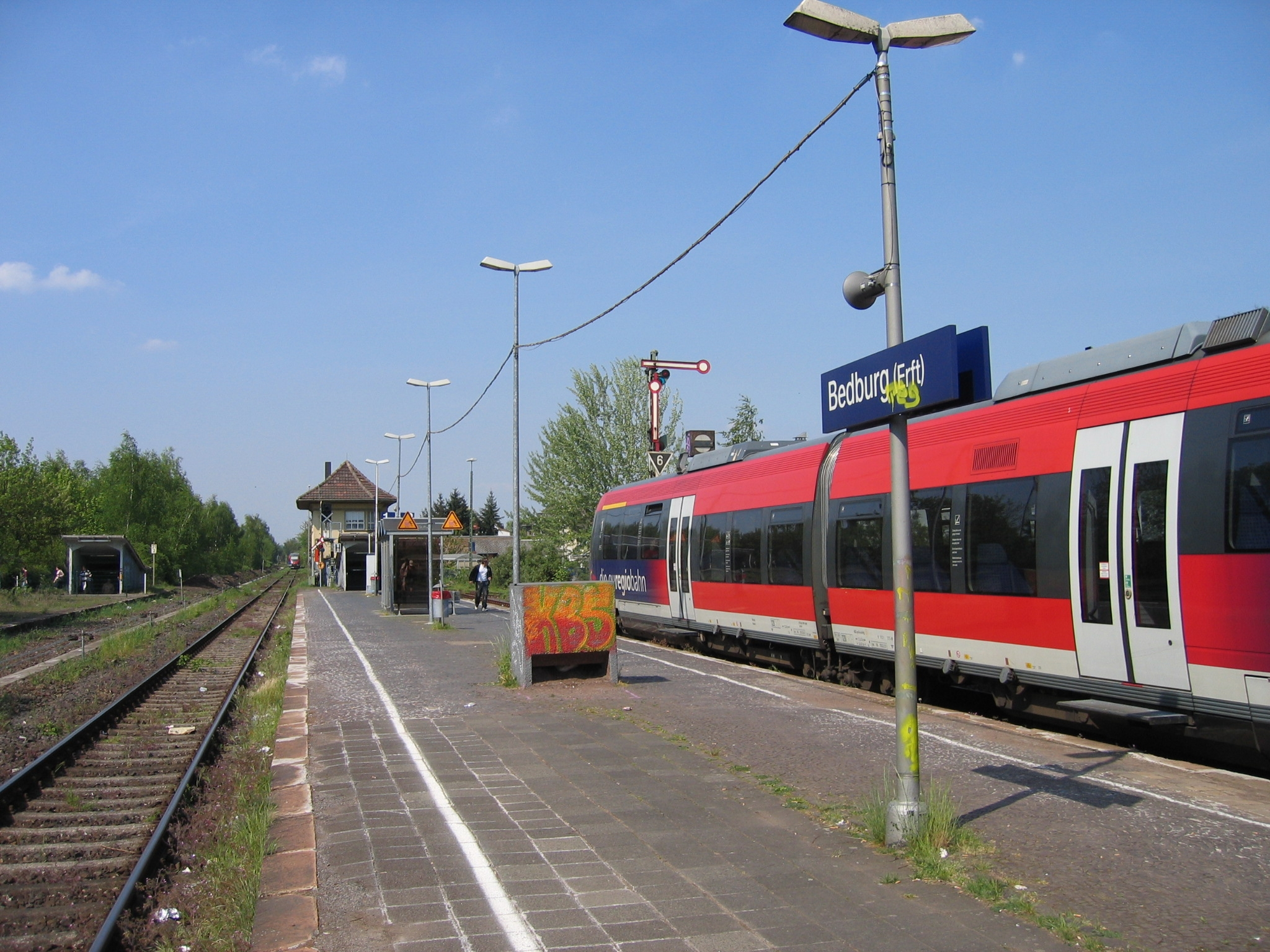
Bedburg station

Bedburg station is located at line-kilometre 21.2 and was opened in 1869. The line to Horrem was opened in 1897 and the Bedburg–Ameln railway, which was popularly known as the Amelner Johännchen (Ameln Johnny), commenced operations in 1898. Bedburg station was located at line-kilometre 0.2 of this line. The traffic on the line to Ameln was closed on 17 March 1953 as it was no longer profitable.

Today, it is hard to imagine how big the station in Bedburg used to be. Because of the Hambach open cast mine, the Düren–Bedburg section was closed in 1995 and dismantled in 1995. The remaining gravel on the former routes is a reminder of the once extensive track infrastructure. Bedburg had two signal boxes ("Bnf" and "Bsf"). "Bsf" was taken out of service in 1995 with the decommissioning of the section to Düren and demolished after a fire. "Bnf" took control of the remaining turnouts and signals until it was taken out of service with the commissioning of the electronic interlocking in 2007.

=== Neurath station ===
Until 1971 Neurath had its own halt (Haltepunkt) for passenger services at line-kilometre 26.5.

=== Frimmersdorf station ===
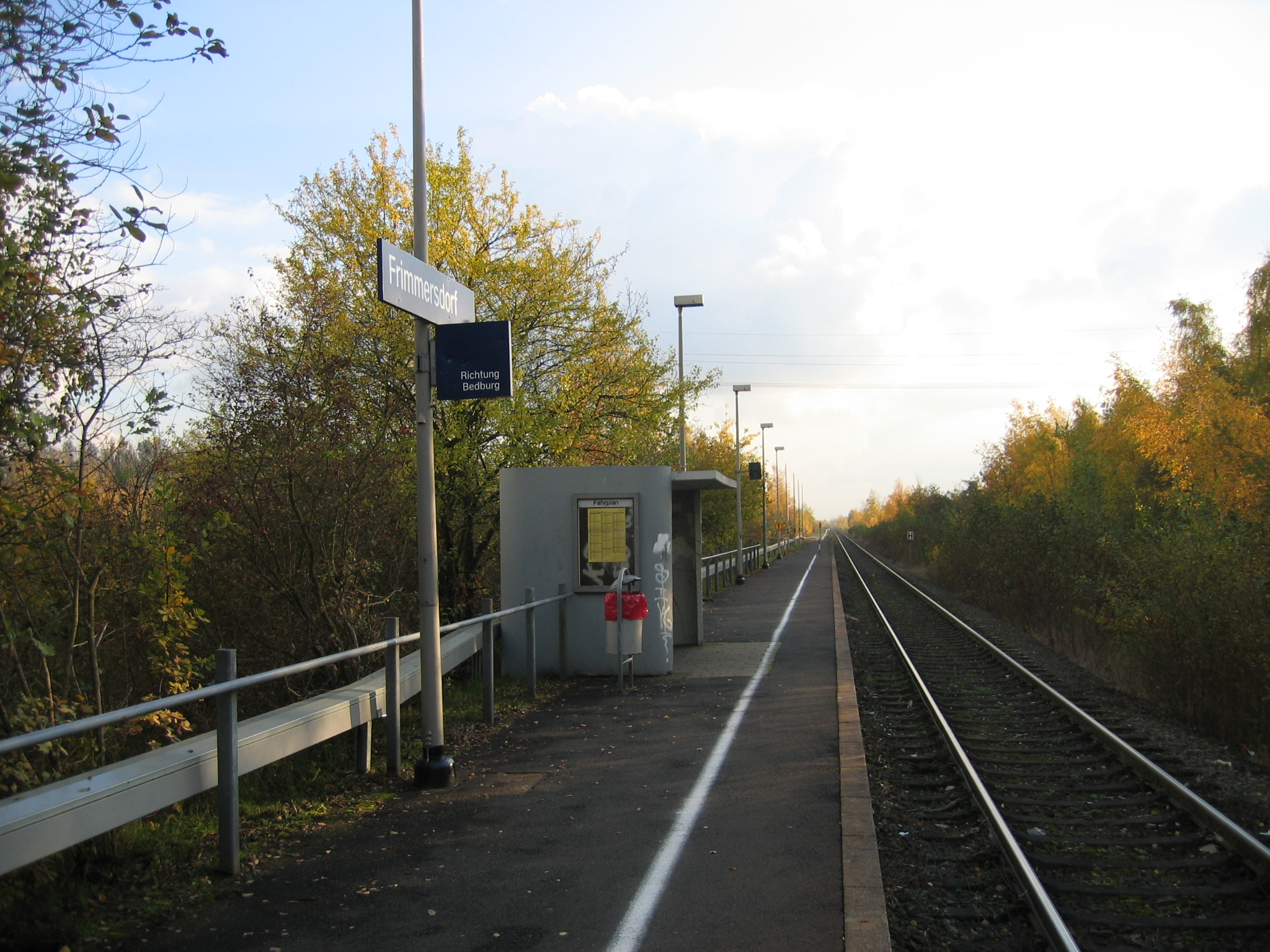
The halt of Frimmersdorf on the Erft Railway

Frimmersdorf has a small halt at line-km 28.6 and a siding to the Frimmersdorf Power Station. The halt was opened with the relocation of the line in January 1976.

=== Kaster and Harff stations ===
Kaster and Harff each received a rail connection in 1896. Harff station was at line-km 25.1 and Kaster station at line-km 24.0. Harff and Kaster stations were used for loading agricultural products and goods from the surrounding villages. Regular mining work began in 1975/76 and Harff and Kaster stations were abandoned with the relocation of the Erft Railway. As a substitute for the abolition of Harff station, the people of Kaster received a new halt on 21 May 1971, but this was only temporary.

Until the decommissioning of the old section of line on 11 January 1976, it ran from Harff station, through the Tiergarten forest, along the old Erft riverbed and past Kaster. At the cemetery, the line crossed the Hauptstraße/St. Rochusstraße level crossing. After Albert-Schweitzer-Straße, which connected to the new district of Morken-Harff for people relocated for mining, the line left Kaster and continued through fields to Lipp and Bedburg. The new section of the line has run since the late 1970s with a halt at Frimmersdorf through the area of the disused Frimmersdorf open cast mine, which has been restored as agricultural land, towards Bedburg.

=== Gustorf station ===
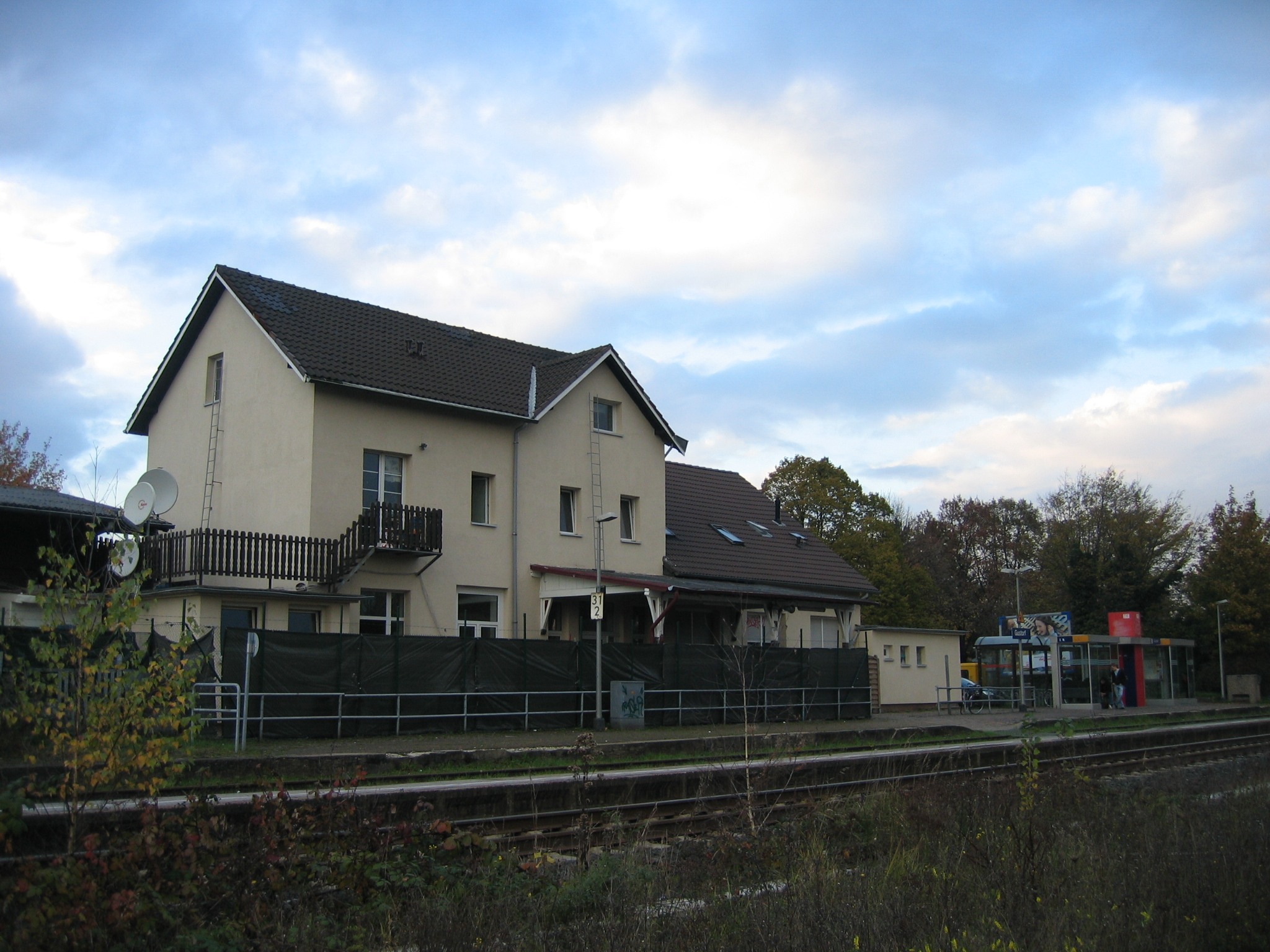
Gustorf station

The halt of Gustorf was opened in 1897 at line-km 31.2. Directly behind the station, a siding branches off to the railway network of RWE Power. Gustorf had two small signal boxes in operation from 1906 to 2006, which have been preserved.

=== Grevenbroich station ===
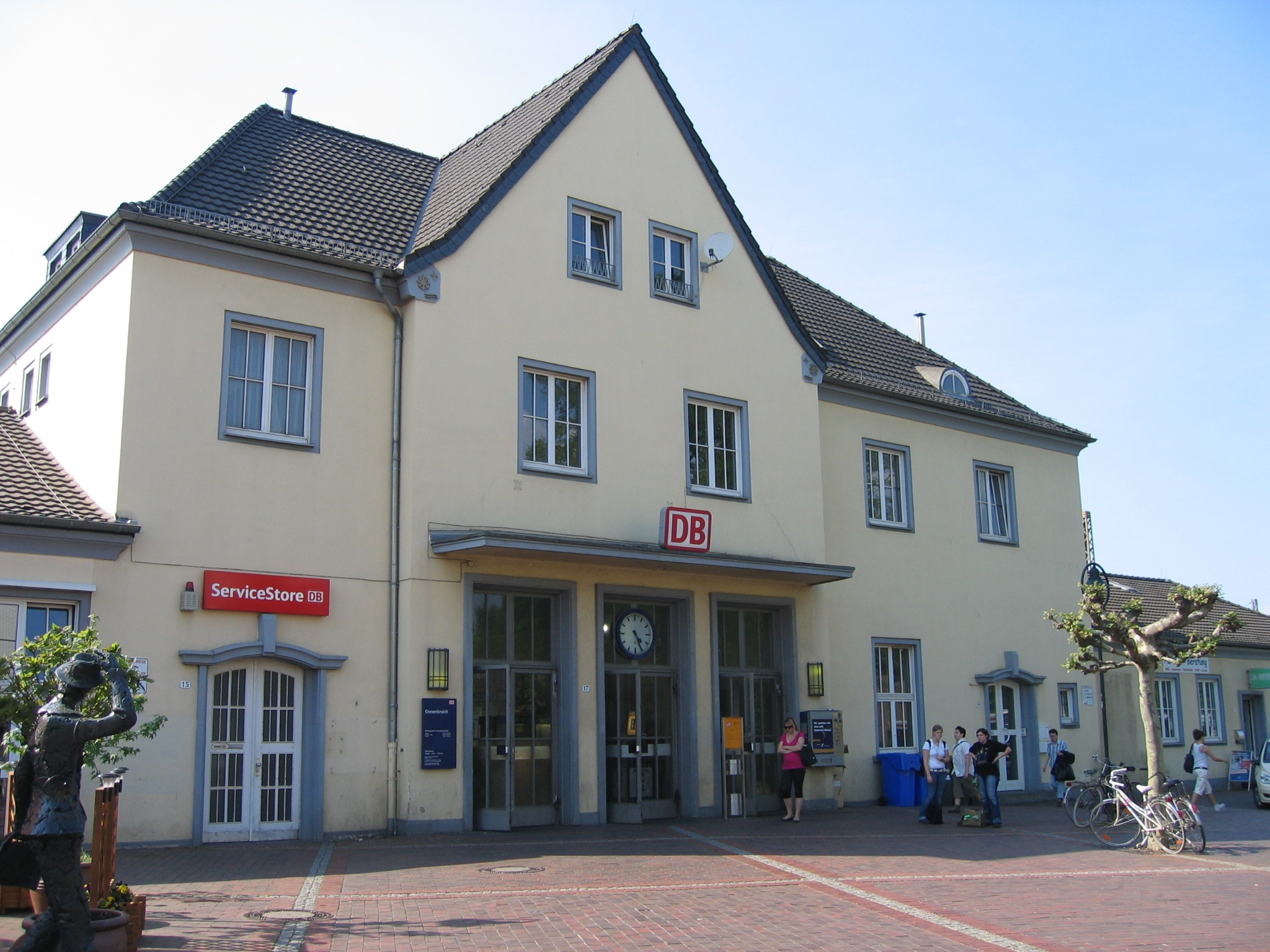
Entrance building of Grevenbroich station

Grevenbroich station was built in 1869 at line-km 34.3 and forms the junction of the Cologne–Mönchengladbach railway with the Düren–Neuss railway. It is served by the RB 38 (Erft-Bahn), RE 8 (Rhein-Erft-Express) and RB 27 (Rhein-Erft-Bahn) services and offers during the day connections every half-hour to the neighboring cities of Düsseldorf and Cologne and at least every hour to Mönchengladbach.

The first station building of Grevenbroich station was demolished after the Second World War because of significant war damage and was replaced in 1959 by a new entrance building, which still exists today.

In addition to the entrance building, passengers have two covered island platforms that serve tracks 1 to 4. The station also has a railway track to the west of the platforms, the remains of the former freight yard. This has been dismantled in recent years so that nothing is now left. Only a large vacant area gives an idea of its former extent. With the commissioning of the Grevenbroich electronic control centre for the Rheydt–Ehrenfeld line in 2007, the "Gnf" and "Gs" signal boxes became superfluous, but they still exist.

=== Kapellen-Wevelinghoven station ===
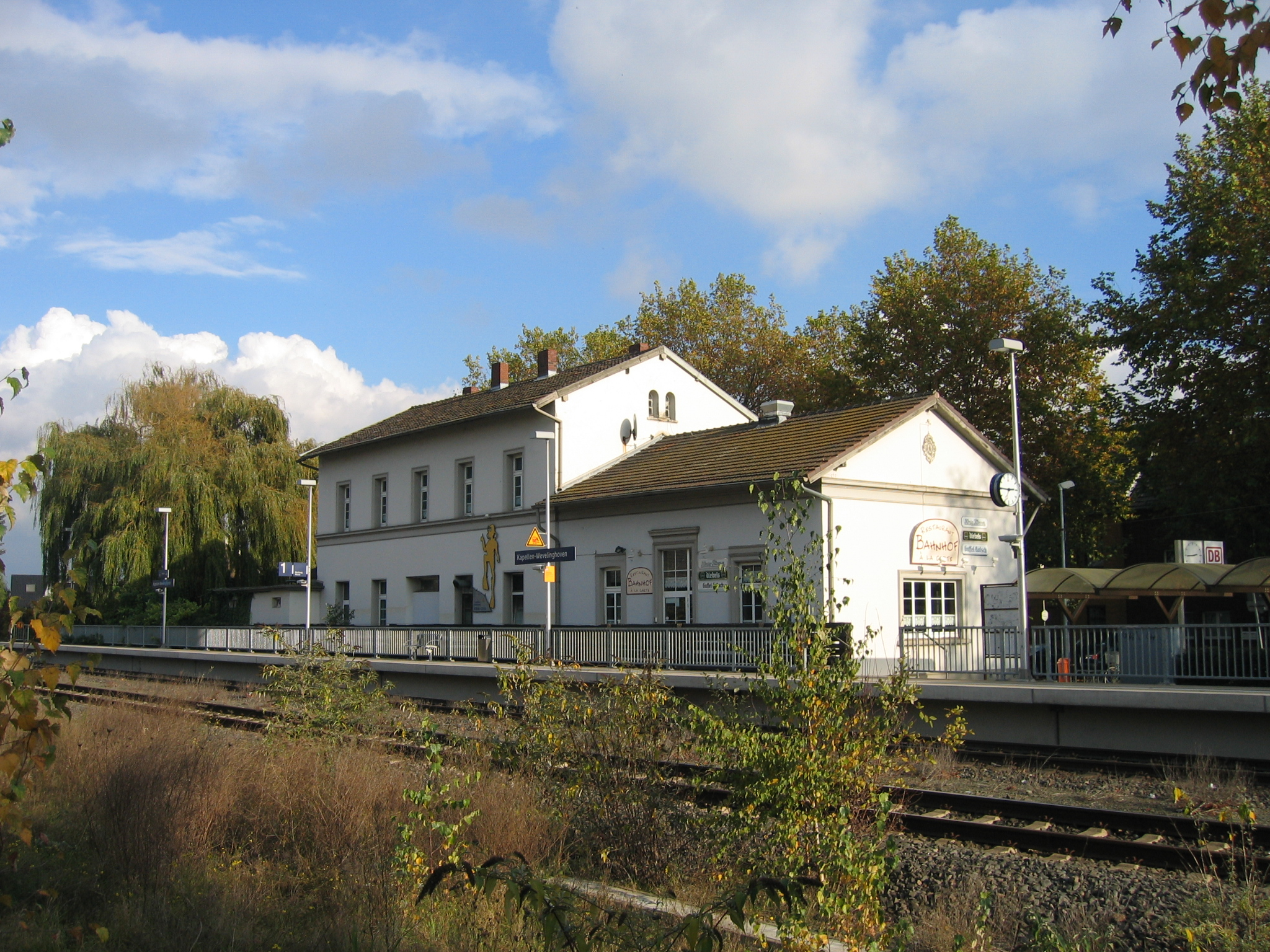
Old entrance building at Kapellen-Wevelinghoven

The halt of Kapellen-Wevelinghoven connects the second largest district of Grevenbroich to the surrounding cities. The former entrance building has not been used for station purposes for a long time.

As part of an upgrade in 2006, modern raised platforms and a new waiting room were built.

=== Holzheim (bei Neuss) station ===
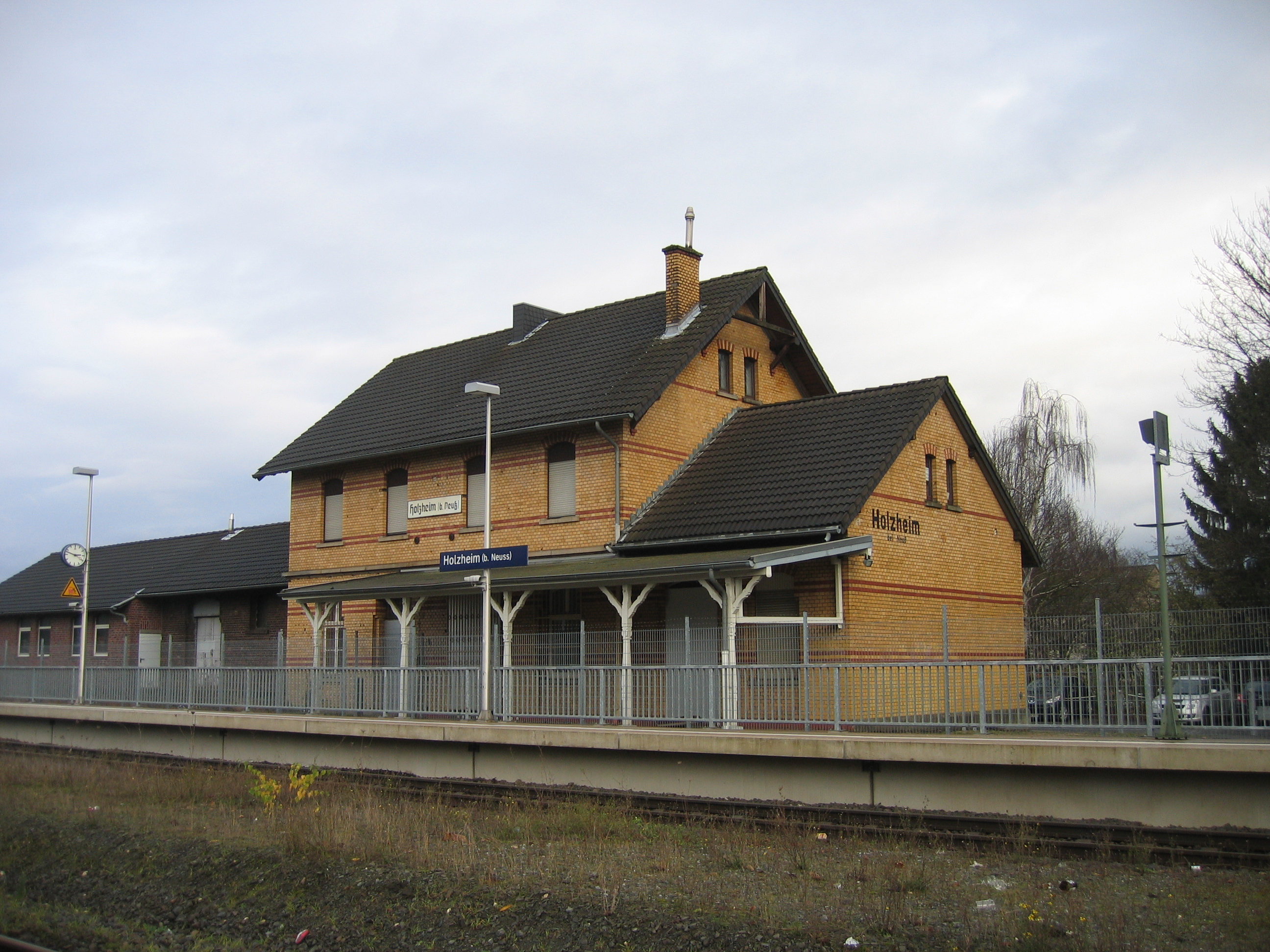
Old entrance building of Holzheim (bei Neuss) station

Holzheim (bei Neuss) station is located in the southwest of Neuss Holzheim, which has been part of the city Neuss since 1975. Here, too, the historic station building is still preserved, but it has long not been used for its original purpose.

Until a few years ago, the Holzheimer station was staffed by a gatekeeper, who controlled the level crossing barriers at the station and the nearby level crossing, which was opened on request by telephone. As part of the track rehabilitation in 2006, the level crossings were automated and the gatekeeper was removed. The operations building was demolished a little later, after instances of vandalism. Furthermore, the station was equipped with modern raised platforms and a new shelter. The tracks were also redesigned, so that passengers no longer had to cross the tracks in the station area.

=== Neuss Hauptbahnhof ===
Neuss Hauptbahnhof was opened in 1853 as an island station, which is located at the intersection of the Lower Left Rhine Railway (Cologne–Kleve) and the Mönchengladbach–Düsseldorf railway. Two other lines branch off: the Düren–Neuss railway and the Neuss–Viersen railway of the private Regiobahn, which has ended in Kaarst since 1984.

With the buses stopping at eight individual bus stops in the station forecourt and the rail services of various transport companies, Neuss Hauptbahnhof is a multimodal transport node.

Neuss Hauptbahnhof is home to a number of shops and has been modernised since 2006, including, among other things, the equipping of the platforms with lifts, which can be used by non-wheelchair users.
