= Bedburg station =

Railway station in Germany

Bedburg (Erft)
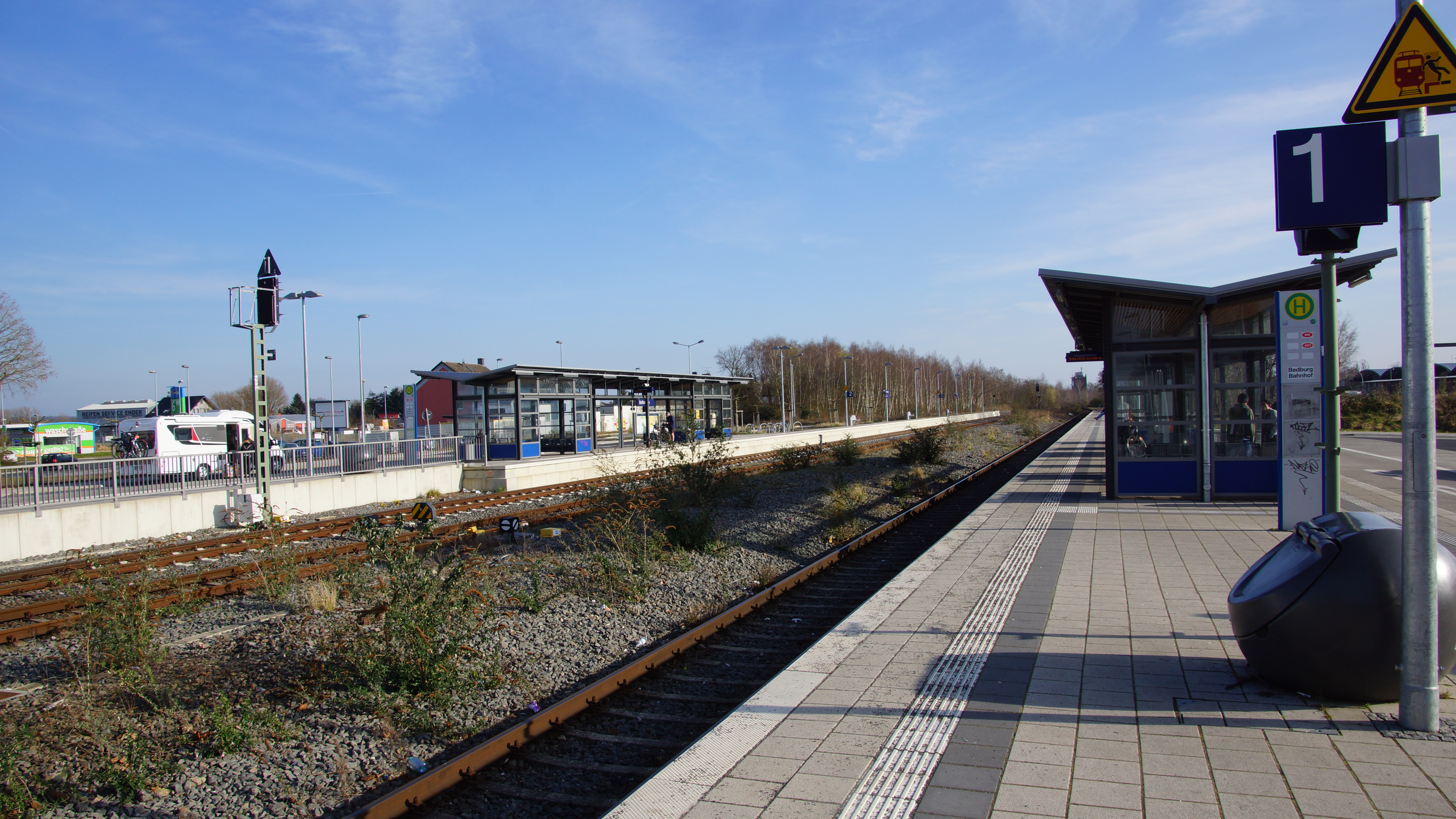
- Bedburg station

General information
- Location: Bahnstraße 15, 50181 Bedburg, NRW; Germany
- Coordinates: 50°59′14″N 6°34′22″E
- Owner: Deutsche Bahn
- Operator: DB Netz; DB Station&Service
- Lines: Düren–Neuss; Bedburg–Horrem; Bedburg–Ameln railway (closed)
- Platforms: 2

Construction
- Accessible: Yes

Other information
- Station code: 447
- DS100 code: KBE
- IBNR: 8000030
- Category: 6
- Fare zone: VRS: 2891
- Website: www.bahnhof.de

History
- Opened: 1869

Services
Preceding station	DB Regio NRW	Following station
Terminus	RB 38	Glesch towards Köln Messe/Deutz
Preceding station	VIAS	Following station
Gustorf towards Düsseldorf Hbf	RB 39	Terminus
Location

Bedburg (Erft) station is a station in the town of Bedburg, in the German state of North Rhine-Westphalia.

== History ==
Bedburg station was opened in 1869 with the Düren–Neuss railway. The Erft Railway to Horrem was opened in 1897. The Bedburg–Ameln railway, which was popularly known as the Amelner Johännchen (Ameln Johnny), commenced operations in 1898. The traffic on the line to Ameln was closed on 17 March 1953 as it was no longer profitable.

Because of the Hambach open cast mine, the Düren–Bedburg section was closed in 1995 and dismantled in 1995. The remaining gravel on the former routes is a reminder of the once extensive track infrastructure. Bedburg had two signal boxes ("Bnf" and "Bsf"). "Bsf" was taken out of service in 1995 with the decommissioning of the section to Düren and demolished after a fire. "Bnf" took control of the remaining turnouts and signals until it was taken out of service with the commissioning of the electronic interlocking in 2007.

== Services ==
Bedburg is served by the RB 38 (Erft-Bahn), which runs every 30 minutes to Horrem, with every second service continuing to Cologne. It is also served by the RB 39 (Düssel-Erft-Bahn), which runs every 60 minutes to Düsseldorf.

Line	Line name	Route
RB 38	Erft-Bahn	Cologne Hbf – Horrem – Bedburg
RB 39	Düssel-Erft-Bahn	Düsseldorf – Neuss – Grevenbroich – Bedburg

== Outlook ==
In the 1990s, it was planned (as part of a network targeted for 2015) to extend the Rhine-Ruhr S-Bahn network from Horrem via Bedburg to Düsseldorf as line S 18. This meant that the line would be upgraded and electrified. The plans for the extension of the S-Bahn on the northern section of the line have not been pursued further by the Verkehrsverbund Rhein-Ruhr (VRR). The Zweckverband Nahverkehr Rheinland (NVR), which is responsible for the southern section and the connecting Erft Railway, is planning to operate the S 12 from Horrem via the Erft Railway to Bedburg. Since the timetable change in December 2017, the new RB 39 service has been running from Neuss in Bedburg. The RB 38 service continues to run between Cologne and Bedburg. Subject to an agreement with the VRR, the S-Bahn will later replace the Regionalbahn service to Grevenbroich.
