= Heppendorf =

- Ortsteil of Elsdorf
- Interactive map of Heppendorf
- Location within Germany Location within North Rhine-Westphalia
- Coordinates: 50°54′40″N 6°38′01″E
- Country: Germany
- State: North Rhine-Westphalia
- Admin. region: Cologne
- District: Rhein-Erft-Kreis
- Municipality: Elsdorf
- Elevation: 70 m (230 ft)

Population (2021)
  - Total: 1,878
- Time zone: UTC+01:00 (CET)
  - Summer (DST): UTC+02:00 (CEST)
- Postal codes: 50189
- Dialling codes: 02271

Heppendorf is a village in the district of Rhein-Erft-Kreis, in North Rhine-Westphalia, Germany. It is part of the municipality Elsdorf.

== Location ==
Heppendorf is bordered to the east by Sindorf, Geilrath to the south, Stammeln to the west and Widdendorf in the north-west. It is located about 30 km to the west of Cologne.
