= Erft Railway =

Railway line in Germany

Bedburg–Horrem railway
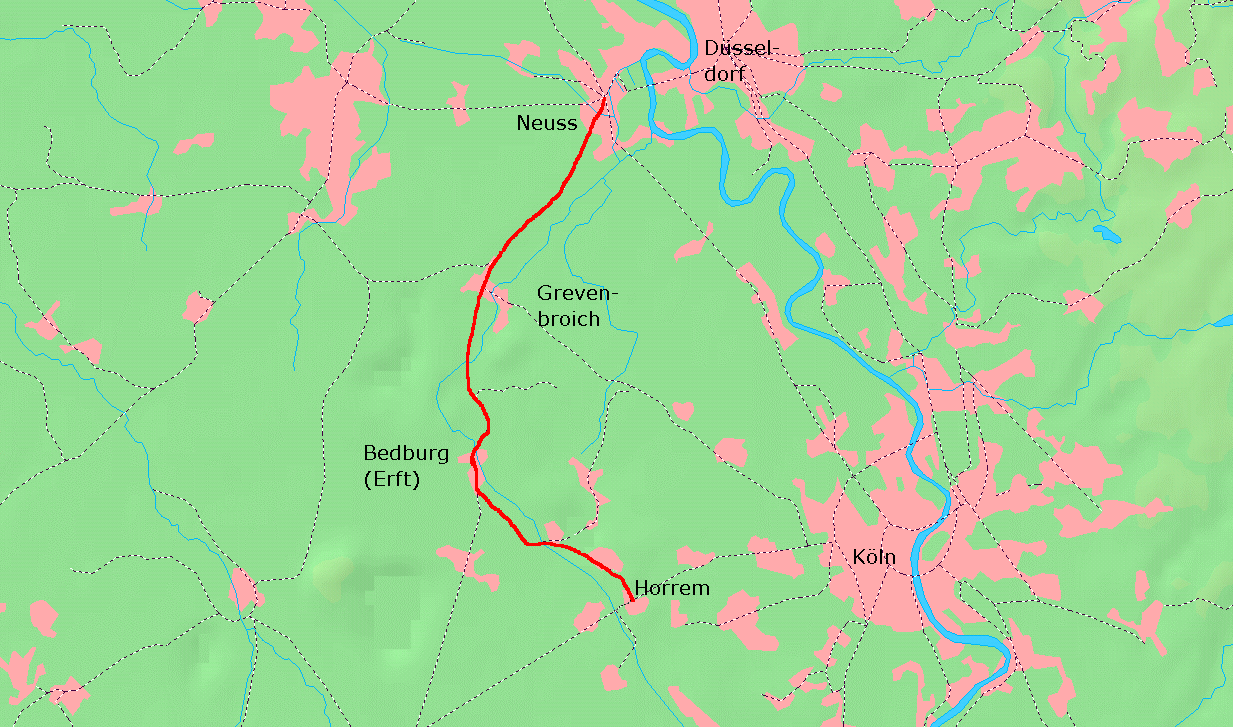
- Current course of the Erft Railway

Overview
- Native name: Erftbahn
- Line number: 2581 (Bedburg–Martinswerk); 2601 (Martinswerk–Horrem)
- Locale: North Rhine-Westphalia, Germany

Service
- Route number: 481

Technical
- Number of tracks: Grevenbroich–Holzheim
- Track gauge: 1,435 mm (4 ft 8 1/2 in) standard gauge
- Operating speed: 100 km/h (62.1 mph) (maximum)

Bedburg–Horrem railway (also known in German as the Erftbahn—Erft Railway) is a line in the German state of North Rhine-Westphalia. The non-electrified main line was originally built as a line of the Bergheim District Railway and operated as a metre gauge railway. Later, the line was converted to standard gauge.

The Erft Railway is listed as table 481 of the German railway timetable. It is served only by the Erftbahn Regionalbahn service.

== Operations and history ==
The Bedburg–Horrem–Mödrath line was opened in 1896 as part of the Bergheim District Railway (Bergheimer Kreisbahn). The line was built as a metre-gauge line and was built by GmbH Lenz & Co, which initially managed it. The line was opened between Mödrath and Zieverich (and continuing to Elsdorf) on 5 November 1896 for freight and on 20 February 1897 for passenger transport. The extension from Zieverich to Bedburg was opened on 8 May 1897. Although initially built as a narrow-gauge line, it had been designed to be upgraded to standard gauge. The track bed was correspondingly wide, it was laid with standard gauge sleepers at reduced spacing, and it used heavy rail. A third rail was installed in 1904. Passenger trains then ran on the narrow gauge track and freight trains ran on the standard gauge track.

In 1913, the Prussian state railway took over the Bergheim District Railway, as had been envisaged in the concession, and the narrow gauge operations were discontinued. After the First World War, the track was straightened largely within its own right of way and rehabilitated.

Passenger traffic was terminated on the Mödrath–Horrem section on 28 May 1972 and freight traffic was abandoned on 1 October 1978.

The Horrem–Quadrath-Ichendorf section was electrified because of its high freight traffic in 1983, but its catenary was dismantled in 1996.

As of 2 June 1991, trains ran through from Neuss to Horrem, continuing in the peak hour to Cologne. The rail service was extended throughout the day to Cologne from 15 December 2002.

On 1 November 2007, the rest of the line was also connected to the electronic signalling centre. At the same time, all older level crossings were upgraded to the state of the art with flashing lights. The crossing at Bahnhofstraße in Holzheim had been equipped with a full barrier and a gatekeeper who visually checked whether the tracks were free of vehicles; this is now done with a radar scanner.

=== Erft railway ===
The Regionalbahn service (Erft-Bahn) operates from Bedburg to Horrem via Bergheim or to Cologne Messe/Deutz (with a stop in Horrem on platform track 19, which is on the other side of the triangular junction from the main platforms). The service has the line number of RB 38 and is operated every half hour on the Bedburg–Horem section and hourly on the remainder by DB Regio NRW.

Between Horrem and Cologne, it runs along the Cologne–Aachen high-speed line.

Until the timetable change on 10 December 2017, the RB 38 (Erft-Bahn) operated from Düsseldorf Hauptbahnhof or Neuss (on weekends) via Bedburg to Köln Messe/Deutz. This service, which is located in the area served by the Verkehrsverbund Rhein-Sieg (Rhine-Sieg Transport association), was shortened to the Bedburg–Cologne section at the timetable change. the section beyond Bedburg was taken over at the timetable change by a new RB 39 (Düssel-Erft-Bahn) service operated by the private transport company VIAS. Passengers wishing to travel beyond Bedburg now have to transfer there. The reason for this division are plans of the authority that is responsible for rail services south of Bedburg, the Zweckverband Nahverkehr Rheinland (Rhineland local transport association), to electrify the Bedburg–Cologne section and operate it as an S-Bahn service. Furthermore, first class has been dropped on the Erft-Bahn service, because of its low use and because trains are always crowded during the peak hour.

=== Rolling stock ===
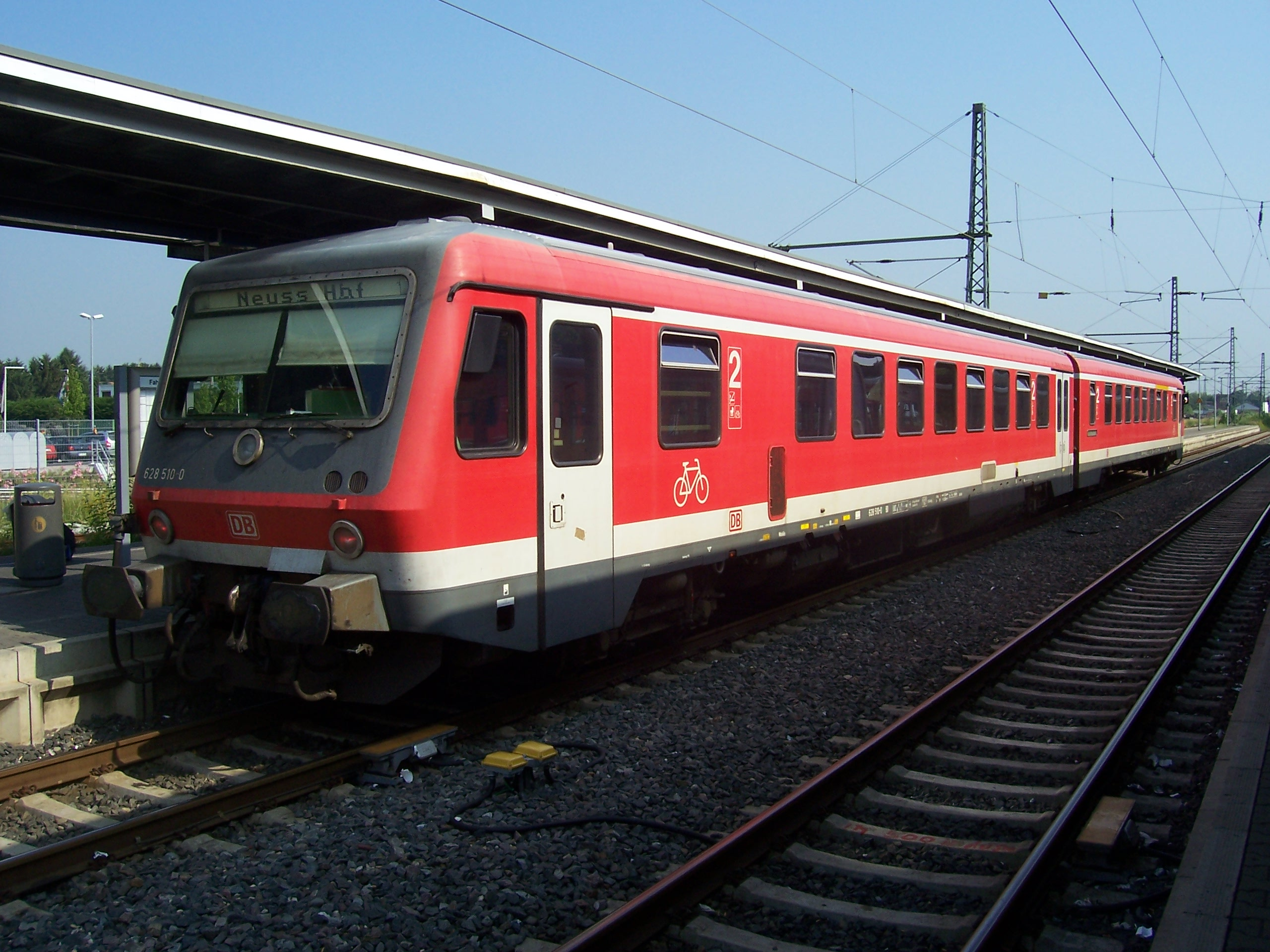
A class 628 set operating Erft-Bahn service in Grevenbroich station

Before the 1990s, class 150 accumulator cars were operated on the line. In the 1990s, class 212 diesel locomotives and later class 215 and 218 locomotives were used together with Silberling carriages. In the late 1990s, the locomotive-hauled trains were replaced with class 628 diesel multiple units. In 2003, two and three carriage class 643 (Bombardier Talent) diesel multiple units was added; two carriage sets were used until the 2010/2011 timetable.

Currently RB 38 services are operated exclusively with class 628 diesel multiple units, mostly as coupled sets with four carriages. Single class 628 sets (two carriages) are used on the short shuttles between Düsseldorf/Neuss and Grevenbroich and between Bedburg and Horrem.

From December 2014 to December 2016 only Bombardier Talent (class 644) sets were used on the whole line between Düsseldorf Hauptbahnhof and Köln Messe/Deutz in coupled sets and additional services ran between Bedburg and Horrem and between Grevenbroich and Neuss in the peak as previously. From the timetable change in December 2016 to the middle of 2017, there were also a few class 628 sets operating between Bedburg and Horrem, as some of the class 644 sets were being renovated. These were repainted, received new seat cushions and headrests and were thoroughly cleaned.

The class 644 sets remain on the new RB 38 service after a thorough refurbishment. It had been planned to runs triple sets on the "long RB 38" (Bedburg–Cologne) route, but this plan failed because the platforms in Glesch, Paffendorf and Zieverich were not long enough.

=== Outlook ===
In the 1990s, it was planned (as part of a network targeted for 2015) to extend the Rhine-Ruhr S-Bahn network from Horrem via Bedburg to Düsseldorf.

The plans for the extension of the S-Bahn on the northern section of the line have not been pursued further by the Verkehrsverbund Rhein-Ruhr (VRR), which is responsible for the northern part of the route (Düsseldorf–Bedburg). This part of the route has been operated by VIAS since December 2017 and the track is shared in Bedburg.

The Zweckverband Nahverkehr Rheinland (Rhineland local transport association, NVR) still plans to upgrade the southern section of the line by around 2020, including electrification and a flying junction in Horrem to connect to the existing S-Bahn line to Cologne. The NVR is pursuing the goal of relieving the Hohenzollern Bridge in Cologne by eliminating the RB 38 services. This would involve running line S 12 services over the Erft Railway from Horrem to Bedburg. The section of the S 12 from Horrem to Düren was taken over by line S 13 and line S 19 from the timetable change in December 2015. A feasibility study from 2012 confirms this option as having a high cost-benefit ratio, partly because part of the cost for the necessary rehabilitation of the line would have had to be invested in maintaining the current operations anyway. Subject to an agreement with the VRR, the S-Bahn service would later replace the Regionalbahn service to Grevenbroich.

A planning agreement was signed with the state in August 2017.

== Route ==
The Erft Railway runs next to the Erft from Bedburg to Bergheim. The line crosses the Erft shortly before Bergheim. Otherwise, the Erft is not in the immediate vicinity of the railway tracks. The railway is a single-track branch line.

=== Bedburg station ===
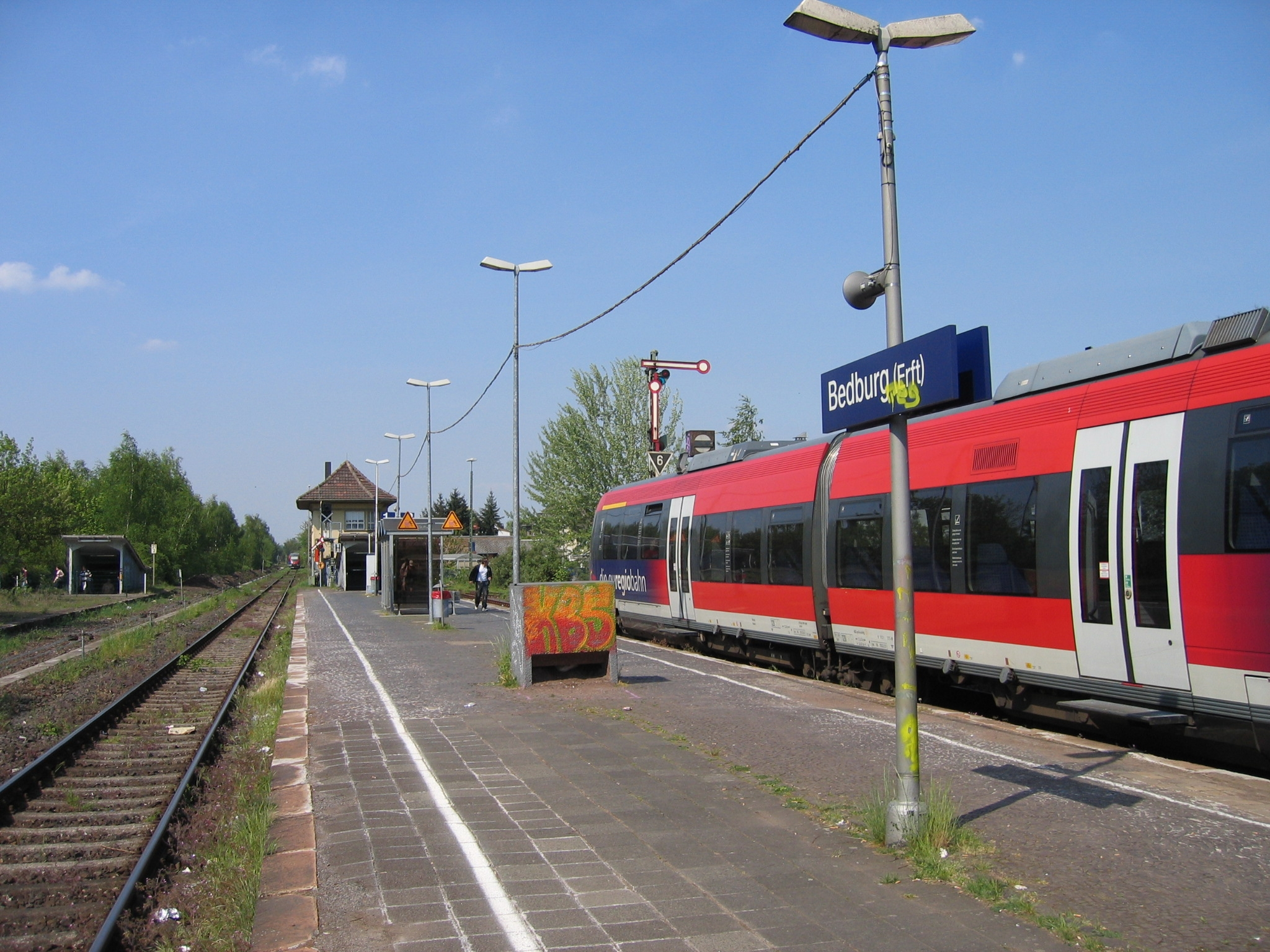
Bedburg station

Bedburg station is located at line-kilometre 21.2 and was opened in 1869. The line to Horrem was opened in 1897 and the Bedburg–Ameln railway, which was popularly known as the Amelner Johännchen (Ameln Johnny), commenced operations in 1898. Bedburg station was located at line-kilometre 0.2 of this line. The traffic on the line to Ameln was closed on 17 March 1953 as it was no longer profitable.

The Düren–Bedburg section was closed in 1995 and dismantled in 1995 to allow the expansion of the Hambach open cast mine. The remaining gravel on the former routes is a reminder of the once extensive track infrastructure. Bedburg had two signal boxes ("Bnf" and "Bsf"). "Bsf" was taken out of service in 1995 with the decommissioning of the section to Düren and demolished after a fire. "Bnf" took control of the remaining turnouts and signals until it was taken out of service with the commissioning of the electronic interlocking in 2007.

=== Glesch station ===
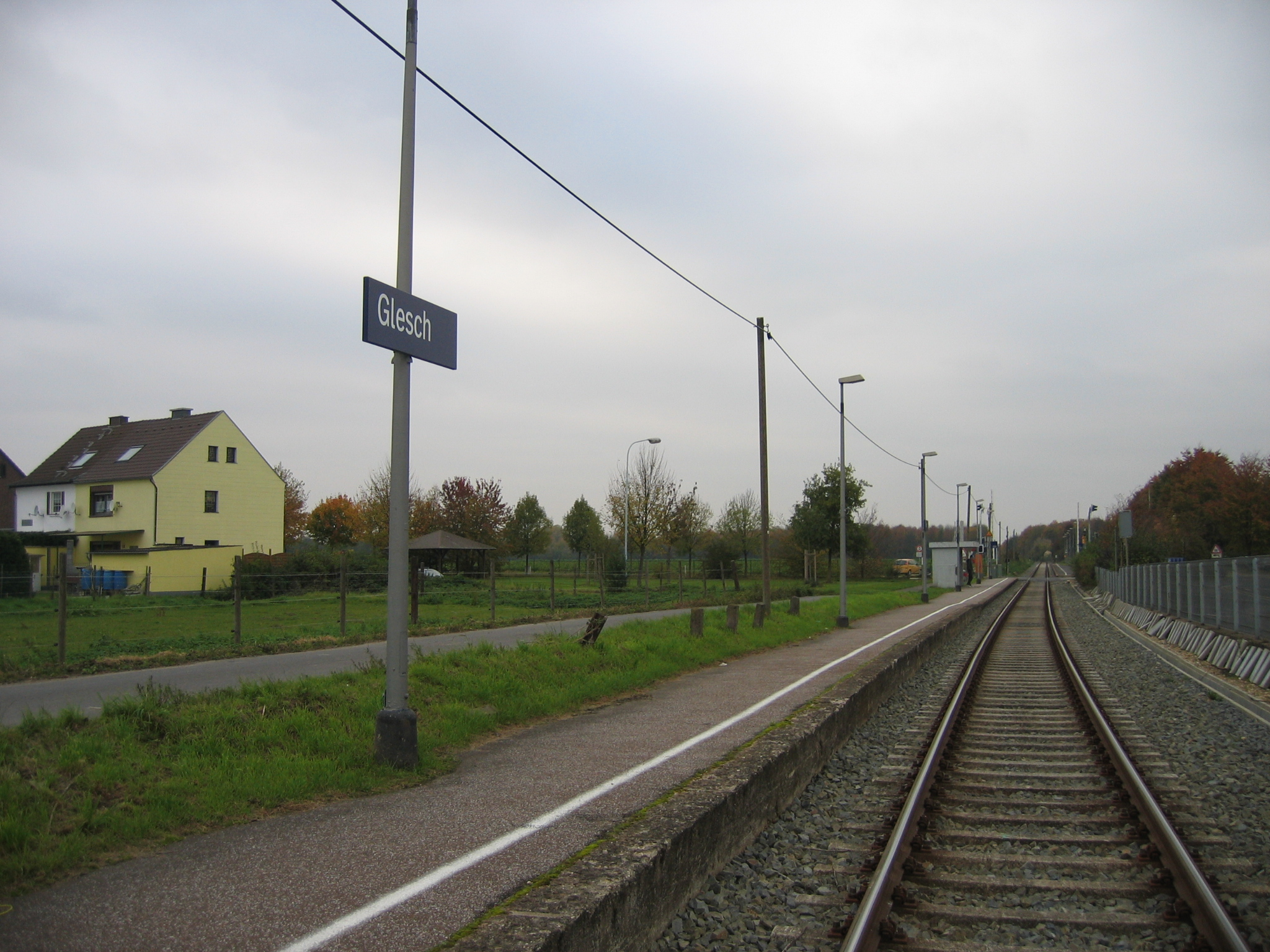
Glesch station

A halt was built the village of Glesch by the Bergheim District Railway in 1897 at its current location at line-kilometer 2.5. The line ran at this point close to the Fortuna-Garstorf open-cast mine.

=== Paffendorf station ===
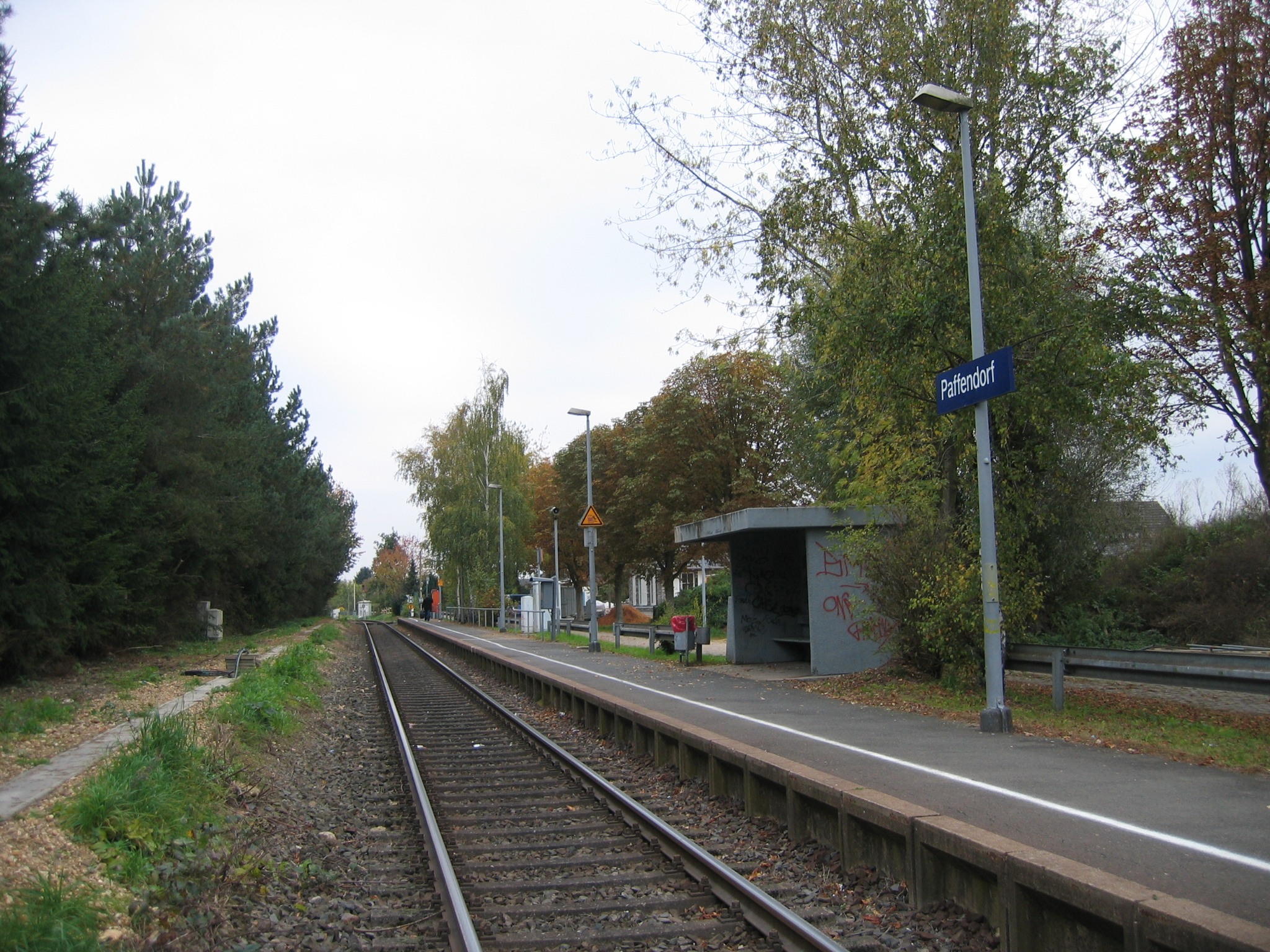
Paffendorf station

The line passes the Hambach Railway (Hambachbahn) of RWE Power, which is used exclusively for the transport of coal and overburden. Immediately after, the railway reaches the halt of Paffendorf at line-kilometer 4.1. The RWE Power Information Centre is located at the local palace (Schloss).

=== Zieverich station ===
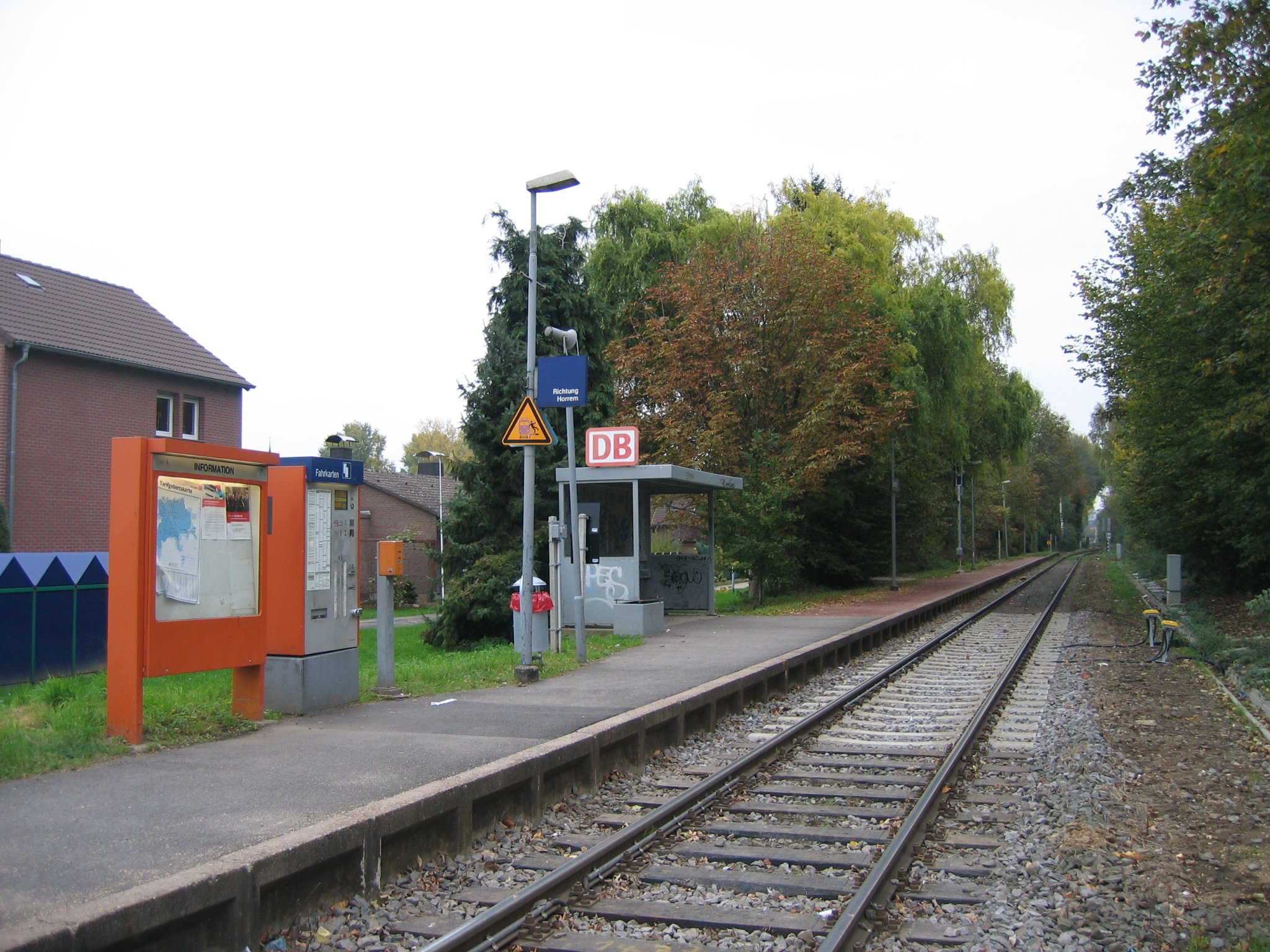
Zieverich station

The two-part halt of Zieverich, built in 1897, is located in greenery at line-kilometre 6.1. The trains running towards Cologne and towards Düsseldorf do not stop at the same platform. The line towards Elsdorf Ost, which was also built by the Bergheim District Railway, branched off here until 1967.

=== Bergheim station ===
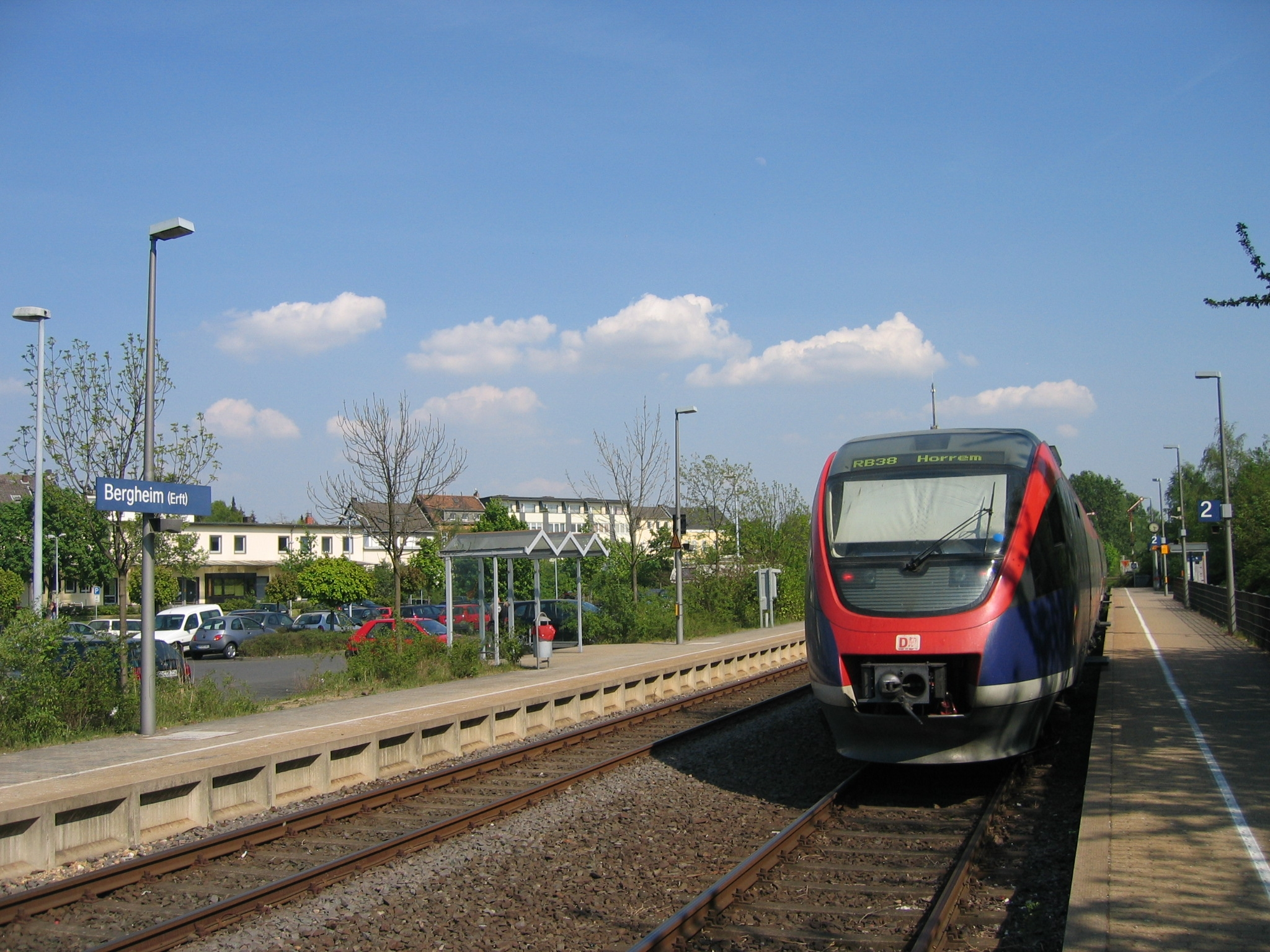
Erft-Bahn service in Bergheim station

Bergheim station was opened in 1897 at line-kilometre 7.6. The old station had an electromechanical dispatcher’s signal box "Bf" (E 43) in the entrance building with semaphore signals as entry and exit signals. Three to four tracks were available for train crossings. There was a three-track railcar shed on tracks 9-11. The platform-less track 12 ran from the back of the railcar shed; this allowed only entrances and exits from or towards Horrem. Tracks 7 and 8 were sidings that lay between the main tracks and the railcar shed. Two dead-end tracks ran from track 1 towards the entrance building, including track 13, which ended at a head loading ramp. The whole station could be seen on a sharp left turn approaching from Horrem.

In 1988, the station was relocated, but the old entrance building was preserved in its original place. Commissioning of the new station took place on 18 April 1988. The platform tracks in Bergheim (Erft) station were put into operation on 27 June 1988. It is located in a new position with straight platform tracks 1 and 2, which have external platforms. Except for the loading track to the head loading ramp, all the other tracks and the railcar shed have been dismantled. The entrance building was demolished at the beginning of 2017 as part of reconstruction work.

The old "Bf" signal box was closed on 28 October 2007, when the control of operations on the track was taken over by the Köln-Ehrenfeld computer-based interlocking, which is controlled from the Duisburg operations centre. The remaining loading track was disconnected.

In the past, branch lines branched off in Bergheim to Bedburg (Erft), Horrem and Rommerskirchen and from Zieverich to Elsdorf Ost. There was also a siding to the Martinswerk aluminum plant and a railcar depot. Passenger trains ran via Horrem to Kerpen among other places.

=== Quadrath-Ichendorf station ===
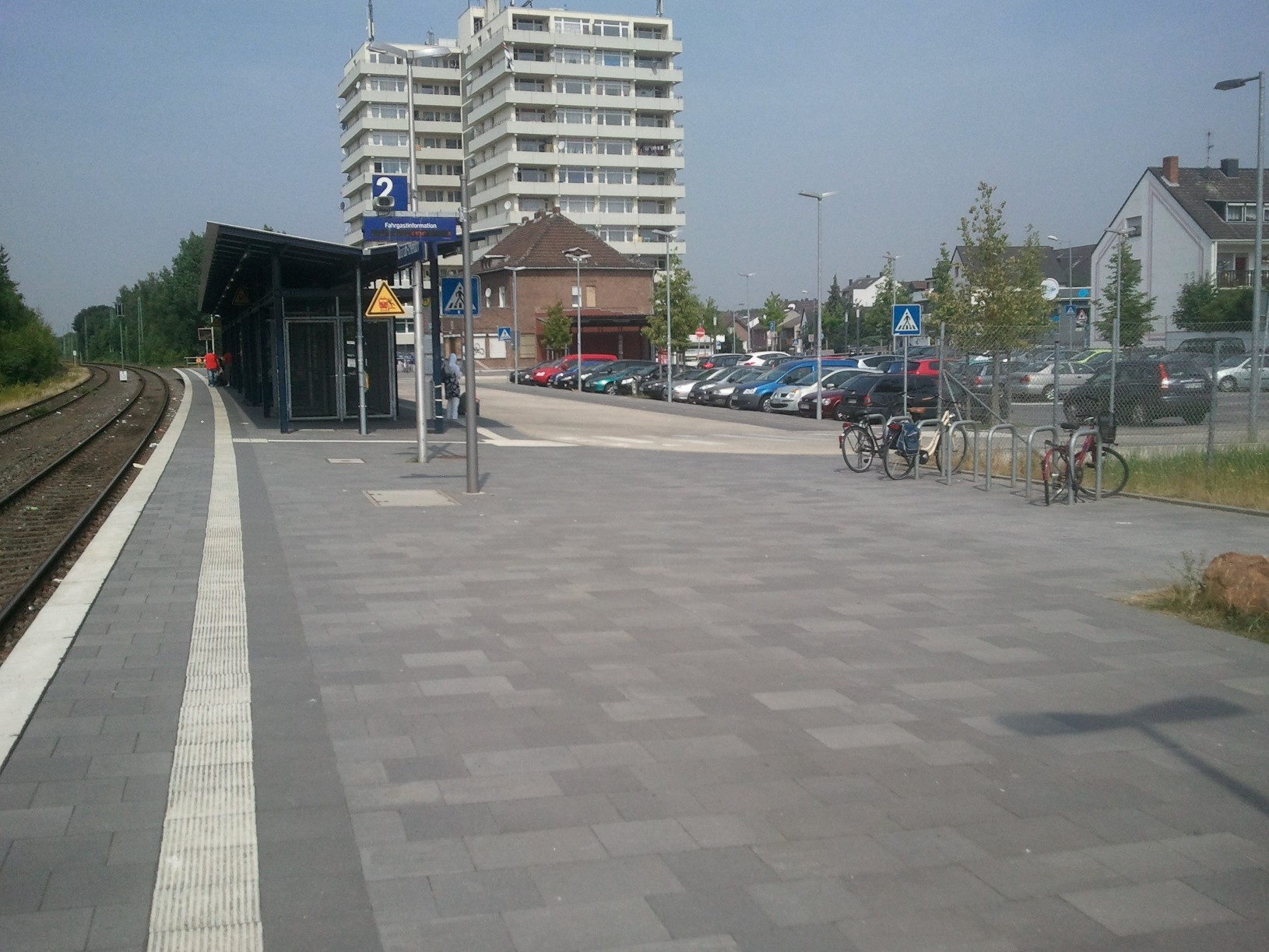
Quadrath-Ichendorf station

The halt of Quadrath-Ichendorf has existed since the line's opening in 1897 at line-kilometre 18.7. From 1983 to 1996, the line was electrified to the Martinswerk junction in Quadrath-Ichendorf. At this point, the Strategic Railway Embankment from Neuss branched off the Erft Railway.

=== Horrem station ===
Horrem station is located at line-kilometre 15.9 of the Erft Railway and connects with the Cologne–Aachen high-speed railway. Horrem station is now the terminus of the Erft Railway; the extension of the line to Mödrath was closed in 1978 and has since been dismantled. The Erft Railway is connected with the high-speed line at the station via a rail triangle. Trains beginning and ending in Horrem stop on the western curve towards Aachen and the trains running to and from Cologne stop on the eastern curve. Horrem is therefore a "triangular" station.

Horrem is a station of the Rhine-Ruhr S-Bahn and is served by lines S 12 (Horrem – Cologne – Siegburg/Bonn – Au (Sieg)), S 13 (Düren – Cologne – Cologne/Bonn Airport – Troisdorf) and S 19 (Düren – Cologne – Cologne/Bonn Airport – Troisdorf – Au (Sieg)). In addition, the Erft-Bahn, the NRW-Express and the Rhein-Sieg-Express stop in Horrem. Long-distance trains currently pass through the station without stopping.

The line to Mödrath crossed the main line to Düren west of the station on a bridge.
