= Elsdorf =

- Town
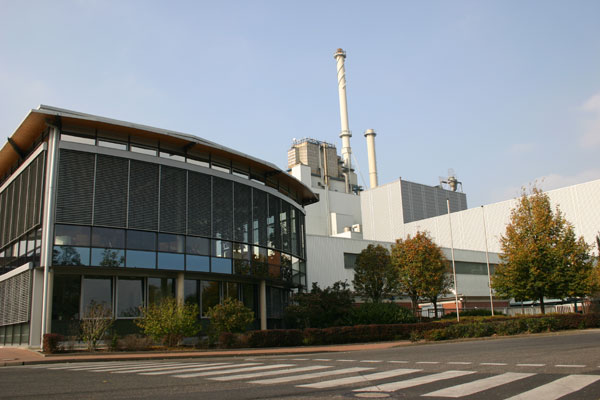
- Sugar factory

- Coat of arms

- Location of Elsdorf within Rhein-Erft-Kreis district
- Interactive map of Elsdorf
- Location within Germany Location within North Rhine-Westphalia
- Coordinates: 50°56′N 6°34′E
- Country: Germany
- State: North Rhine-Westphalia
- Admin. region: Köln
- District: Rhein-Erft-Kreis
- Subdivisions: 14

Government
  - Mayor (2020–25): Andreas Heller (CDU)

Area
  - Total: 66.17 km^{2} (25.55 sq mi)
- Elevation: 80 m (260 ft)

Population (2025-12-31)
  - Total: 21,284
  - Density: 321.7/km^{2} (833.1/sq mi)
- Time zone: UTC+01:00 (CET)
  - Summer (DST): UTC+02:00 (CEST)
- Postal codes: 50189
- Dialling codes: 02274; 02271 (Heppendorf / Widdendorf)
- Vehicle registration: BM
- Website: www.elsdorf.de

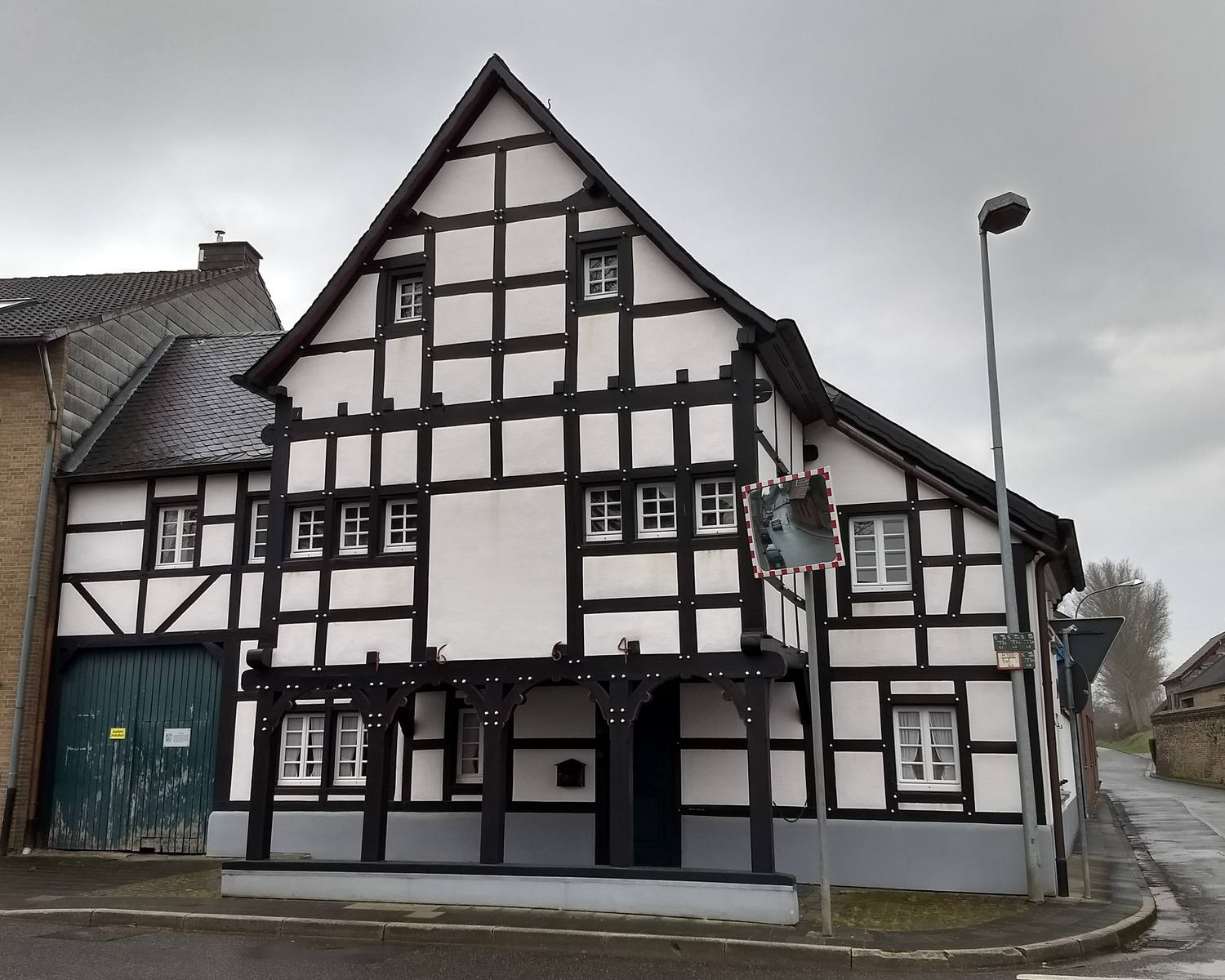
Timber-framed house in Oberembt

Elsdorf (German pronunciation: [ˈɛlsˌdɔʁf]) is a town in the Rhein-Erft-Kreis, in North Rhine-Westphalia, Germany. It is situated approximately 5 km south-west of Bergheim and 27 km west of Cologne.

== Population ==
Historical population

Year	Pop.	±% p.a.
1965	14,470	—
1970	15,215	+1.01%
1975	16,667	+1.84%
1980	17,496	+0.98%
1985	18,754	+1.40%
1990	19,944	+1.24%
1995	21,343	+1.37%

Year	Pop.	±% p.a.
2000	21,692	+0.32%
2005	21,674	−0.02%
2010	21,193	−0.45%
2015	21,232	+0.04%
2020	21,745	+0.48%
2025	21,284	−0.43%

Source: Landesdatabank Nordrhein-Westfalen

== Notable people ==
- Eugen Langen (1833–1895), entrepreneur, engineer and inventor, co-founder of the Elsdorf sugar factory Pfeifer & Langen
- Werner Marx (1746–1806), General Vicar of the Archbishop of Cologne

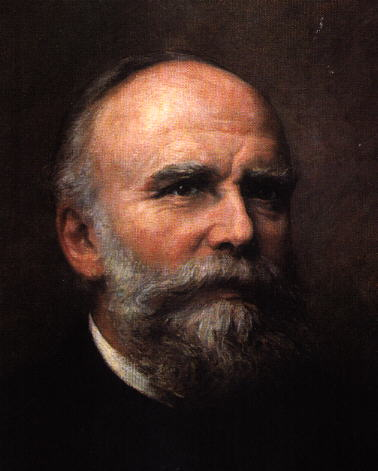
Eugen Langen
