= Tallest structures by category =

Burj Khalifa in Dubai, the world's tallest building

These are the world's tallest structures by category.

This article requires the structure to be "topped out".

== By design ==
=== Among existing structures ===
Category	Structure	Country	Location	Height (meters)	Height (feet)	Year built	Coordinates
Tethered aerostat	SkyGuard			6,096	20,000	2025	(movable)
Spar oil platform	Perdido	United States	Gulf of Mexico	2,934	9,627	2011	26°7′44″N 94°53′53″W
Floating production storage and offloading unit	Turritella	United States	Gulf of Mexico	2,900	9,514	2016	
Semi-submersible oil platform	Independence Hub	United States	Gulf of Mexico	2,438	8,000	2007	
Extended tension-leg oil platform	Big Foot	United States	Gulf of Mexico	1,580	5,180	2018	
Tallest structure supported by land, also tallest freestanding structure, and tallest building	Burj Khalifa	United Arab Emirates	Dubai	829.8	2,722	2010	25°11′50″N 55°16′27″E
Compliant tower (oil platform)	Petronius	United States	Gulf of Mexico	640	2,100	2000	29°06′30″N 87°56′30″W
Self-supporting tower	Tokyo Skytree	Japan	Tokyo	634	2,080	2011	35°42′36″N 139°48′39″E
Guyed mast	KRDK-TV mast	United States	Traill County, North Dakota	627.8	2,060	1966	47°16′45″N 97°20′26″W
Highest bridge (vs ground below)	Huajiang Canyon Bridge	China	Guizhou province	625	2,051	2025	25°42′17″N 105°35′17″E
Hyperboloid structure	Canton Tower	China	Guangzhou	604	1,982	2010	23°6′32″N 113°19′8″E
Clock tower (multi-functional structure)	Abraj Al Bait	Saudi Arabia	Mecca	601	1,972	2019	21°25′08″N 39°49′35″E
Fixed oil platform	Bullwinkle	United States	Gulf of Mexico	529	1,736	1988	27°53′01″N 90°54′04″W
Gravity-based structure	Troll A platform	Norway	North Sea	472	1,549	1996	60°40′N 3°40′E
Mast radiator	INS Kattabomman umbrella antenna	India	Vijayanarayanam, Tamil Nadu	471	1,545	1990	8°23′14″N 77°45′06″E
Twin buildings	Petronas Twin Towers	Malaysia	Kuala Lumpur	452	1,483	1998	3°09′27″N 101°42′41″E; 3°09′29″N 101°42′43″E
Steel building	Willis Tower	United States	Chicago, Illinois	442	1,450	1974	41°52′44″N 87°38′9″W
Telecommunication, commercial	Milad Tower	Iran	Tehran	435	1,427	2007	35°44′41″N 51°22′31″E
Chimney	Chimney of GRES-2 Power Station	Kazakhstan	Ekibastuz	419.7	1,377	1987	52°1′26″N 75°28′34″E
Steel / Concrete building	One World Trade Center	United States	New York, New York	417	1,368	2014	40.7127°N 74.0134°W
Radar	Dimona Radar Facility	Israel	Dimona	400	1,312	2008	30°58′7″N 35°05′50″E ; 30°58′32″N 35°05′55″E
Partially guyed tower	Indosiar TV Tower	Indonesia	Jakarta	395	1,296	2006	6°11′38″S 106°46′6″E
Electricity pylon	Jintang-Cezi Overhead Powerline Link	China	Jintang Island	380	1,247	2019	30°05′1″N 121°53′11″E ; 30°05′47″N 121°54′34″E
Building designed by women	St. Regis	United States	Chicago, Illinois	363	1,191	2020	41°53′14″N 87°37′02″W
Tallest bridge (vs its supports)	Changtai Yangtze River Bridge	China	Jiangsu province	352	1,155	2025	32°00′31″N 119°58′06″E
Blaw-Knox tower (diamond cantilever tower)	Lakihegy Tower	Hungary	Szigetszentmiklós	314	1,031	1946	47°22′23″N 19°0′16″E
Man-made dam	Jinping-I Dam	China	Yalong River	305	1,001	2013	28°10′58″N 101°37′51″E
Landmark Tower design	Star Tower	United States	Cincinnati, Ohio	291	954	1991	39°12′01″N 84°31′22″W
Wind turbine	DEW-18 MW-260	China	Shantou	274	899	2024	23.248833°N 116.748876°E
Elevator test tower	H1 Tower	China	Guangzhou	273.8	898	2020	23°01′03″N 113°17′30″E
Solar power tower	Mohammed bin Rashid Al Maktoum Solar Park	United Arab Emirates	Saih Al-Dahal	262	860	2020	24.7547°N 55.365°E
Ferris wheel	Ain Dubai	UAE	Bluewater Island, Dubai	250	820	2021	25°04′48.4″N 55°07′26.6″E
Crane	LR 13000	Germany		248	814	2013	(movable)
Aerial tramway support tower	Cat Hai – Phu Long cable car towers	Vietnam	Hạ Long	214.8	704	2020	
Jackup rig	Noble Lloyd Noble	Liberia		214	702	2016	(movable)
Cooling tower	Pingshan Power Station	China	Huaibei	210	689	2020	33°49′53.7″N 116°49′39.7″E
Flagpole	Cairo Flagpole	Egypt	New Administrative Capital	201.952	662.572	2021	30°00′48.7″N 31°45′17.5″E
Monument	Gateway Arch	United States	St. Louis, Missouri	192	630	1965	38°37′28.62″N 90°11′5.87″W
Water tower	Main tower of Kuwait Towers	Kuwait	Kuwait City	187	614	1979	29°23′22.75″N 48°00′11.57″E
Masonry tower	Anaconda Smelter Stack	United States	Anaconda, Montana	178.3	585	1919	46°06′36.53″N 112°54′48.8″W
Inclined structure	Montreal Tower	Canada	Montreal	175	574	1976	45°33′33.53″N 73°33′7.61″W
Obelisk	San Jacinto Monument	United States	La Porte, Texas	173.7	570	1939	29°44′59.46″N 95°04′50.52″W
Power station building	Niederaussem Power Station	Germany	Bergheim	172	564	2002	50°59′44″N 06°40′09″E
Masonry building	Mole Antonelliana	Italy	Turin	167.5	550	1889	45°04′8.45″N 7°41′35.62″E
Roller coaster	Falcons Flight	Saudi Arabia	Qiddiya City	163	535	2025	24°35′15″N 46°20′0″E
Industrial hall	Vehicle Assembly Building	United States	Kennedy Space Center, Florida	160	525	1966	28°35′9.64″N 80°39′2.11″W
Air traffic control tower	Kuala Lumpur International Airport 2 Control Tower	Malaysia	Sepang	141.3	463.6	2013	2.740486°N 101.679069°E
Swing ride	Stars Flyer	United Arab Emirates	Dubai	140	460	2021	25°5′0.0″N 55°18′0″E
Drop tower	Zumanjaro: Drop of Doom	United States	Jackson Township, New Jersey	139	456	2014	40.140623°N 74.433543°W
Tomb	Great Pyramid of Giza	Egypt	Giza	138.8	455.2	2560 BCE	29°58′44.93″N 31°08′3.09″E
Gantry crane	Kockums Crane	South Korea	Ulsan	138	453	1974	(movable)
Storage silo	Swissmill Tower	Switzerland	Zurich	118	387	2016	47.389628°N 8.527086°E
Gasometer	Gasometer Oberhausen	Germany	Oberhausen	117.5	386	1929	51°29′39″N 6°52′14″E Currently used as an exhibition and event hall
Wooden structure	Gliwice Radio Tower	Poland	Gliwice	112	367	1935	50°18′48.12″N 18°41′20.26″E
Sphere	Sphere at the Venetian Resort	United States	Las Vegas, Nevada	112	366	2023	36°07′14″N 115°09′41″W
Vertical axis wind turbine	Éole	Canada	Gaspésie	110	361	1987	49°04′35″N 66°44′06″W
Clock tower (single function structure)	Joseph Chamberlain Memorial Clock Tower	United Kingdom	Birmingham	100	328	1908	52.4499°N 1.9307°W
Wooden building	Ascent MKE	United States	Milwaukee, Wisconsin	87	284	2022	43°2′36″N 87°54′11″W
Lighthouse	Île Vierge Lighthouse	France	Finistère	82.5	271	1902	48°38′20″N 4°34′09″W
Loam building	Weilburg Pisé House	Germany	Weilburg	23.2	76	1828	50°29′13.28″N 8°15′34.11″E

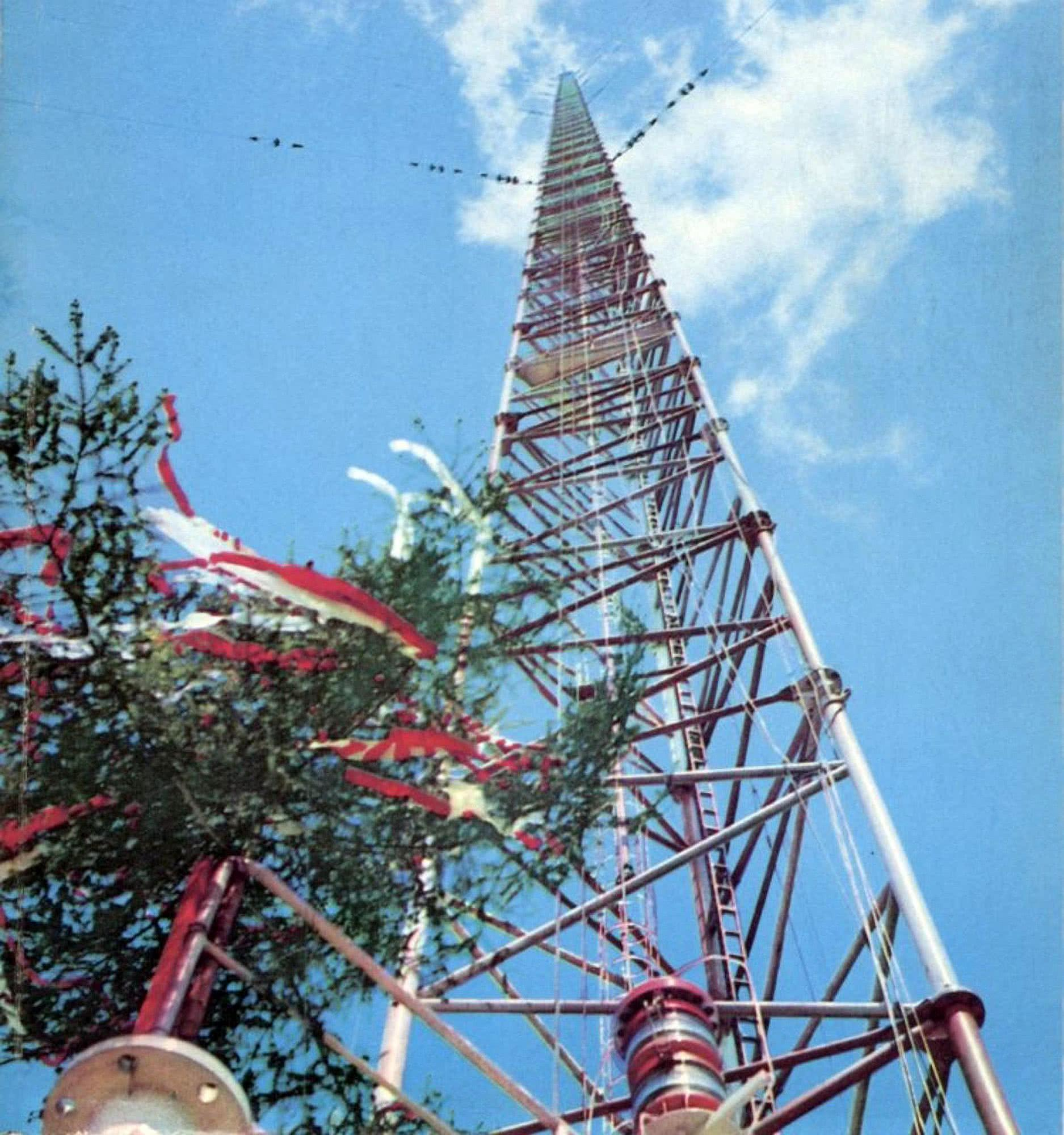
Warsaw radio mast, the height record holder from 1974 to 1991

=== Unsurpassed destroyed structures ===
Category	Structure	Country	Location	Height (metres)	Height (feet)	Years / Notes	Coordinates
Guyed mast	Warsaw Radio Mast	Poland	Gąbin	646.38	2,121	Completed in 1974, collapsed on August 8, 1991	52°22′3.74″N 19°48′8.73″E
Scientific research tower	BREN Tower	United States	Nevada Test Site	462	1,516	Completed in 1962, demolished May 23, 2012	36°46′50.23″N 116°14′36.9″W
Guyed tubular steel mast	Shushi-Wan Omega Transmitter	Japan	Tsushima	389	1,276	Completed in 1973, dismantled in 1998	34°36′53″N 129°27′13″E
Solar updraft tower	Manzanares Solar Chimney	Spain	Manzanares	195	640	Completed in 1982, the tower's guy-wires were not protected against corrosion and failed due to rust and storm winds causing the tower to collapse in 1989. Small-scale experimental model of a solar draft tower, newer proposals if built could become the tallest structure on earth.	39°02′34.45″N 3°15′12.21″W
Wooden structure	Mühlacker Wood Radio Tower	Germany	Mühlacker	190	623	Completed in 1934, destroyed on April 6, 1945, by the Germans to prevent usage by the Allies, replaced by mast radiator	48°56′27.67″N 8°51′8.24″E
Pre-Industrial era building	Lincoln Cathedral	United Kingdom	Lincoln	160	524	Completed in 1311, spire blown off in 1549. Held the record until 1884.	53°14′3.26″N 0°32′10.54″W
Telescope	Arecibo Telescope	Puerto Rico	Arecibo, Puerto Rico	150	492	Completed in 1963, collapsed on December 1, 2020	18°20′39″N 66°45′10″W
Gasometer	Gasometer Zeche Nordstern	Germany	Gelsenkirchen	147	482	Completed in 1938, damaged at an air raid on May 13, 1940, in such a manner that it was not usable any more and had to be demolished.	
Storage silo	Henninger Turm	Germany	Frankfurt	120	394	Constructed in 1961, demolished in 2013	50°05′50.18″N 8°41′36.81″E

== By use ==
Category	Structure	Country	Location	Architectural top		Year built	Coordinates
Category	Structure	Country	Location	(metres)	(feet)	Year built	Coordinates
Mixed-use*	Burj Khalifa	United Arab Emirates	Dubai	830	2,722	2010	25°11′50.0″N 55°16′26.6″E
Industrial	Petronius (oil platform)	United States	Gulf of Mexico	640	2,100	2000	29°06′30″N 87°56′30″W
Office	Ping An Finance Center	China	Shenzhen	555	1,821	2017	22°32′12″N 114°3′1″E
Residential	Central Park Tower	United States	New York, New York	472.4	1,550	2020	40°45′59″N 73°58′52″W
Military	Large masts of INS Kattabomman	India	Tirunelveli, Tamil Nadu	471	1,545	1990	8.3870°N 77.7529°E
Hotel	Ciel Dubai Marina	United Arab Emirates	Dubai	377	1,237	2025	25.08744°N 55.14454°E
Scientific research tower	Amazon Tall Tower Observatory	Brazil	São Sebastião do Uatumã	325	1,066	2015	2.1430°S 59.0010°W
Educational	Moscow State University	Russia	Moscow	240	787	1953	55.7039°N 37.5286°E
Hospital	Outpatient Center, Houston Methodist Hospital	United States	Houston, Texas	156.05	511.8	?	?
Air cleaning	Xi'an air purification tower (HSALSCS)	China	Xi'an			2016	?

* "Mixed-use" is defined as having three or more real estate uses (such as retail, office, hotel, etc.) that are physically and functionally integrated in a single property and are mutually supporting.

== Religious ==
Category	Structure	Country	Location	Height (meters)	Height (feet)	Year built	Coordinates
Tallest religious building overall, also tallest mosque	Djamaa el Djazaïr	Algeria	Algiers	265	870	2019	36°44′09″N 3°08′17″E
Tallest church (Catholic)	Sagrada Família	Spain	Barcelona	172.5	566	2026	41°24′13″N 2°10′28″E
Tallest Protestant church (Lutheran)	Ulm Minster	Germany	Ulm	161.5	530	1890	48.398497°N 9.991797°E
Buddhist building	Tianning Temple	China	Changzhou	153.79	505	2007	31°46′37″N 119°57′55″E
Memorial cross	Santa Cruz del Valle de los Caídos	Spain	El Escorial	152.4	500	1957	40°38′31.46″N 4°9′19.6″W
Eastern Orthodox Church	National Cathedral of Romania	Romania	Bucharest	127	417	2025	44.426006°N 26.082055°E
Buddhist Stupa	Shwemawdaw Pagoda	Myanmar	Bago	125	410	1954	17.3368744°N 96.496954°E
Anglican / Episcopal church	Salisbury Cathedral	United Kingdom	Salisbury	123.1	404	1330	51°3′53″N 1°47′51″W
Dome	Basilica of Our Lady of Peace of Yamoussoukro	Ivory Coast	Yamoussoukro	111	364	1990	6.811126°N 5.296918°W
Hindu temple	Chaturbhuj Temple	India	Orchha	105	344	1500s	25°21′0″N 78°8′24″E
Mormon temple	Washington D.C. Temple	United States	Washington, D.C.	88	288	1974	39°0′51″N 77°3′56″W
Hindu Gopuram	Murudeshwara Temple	India	Murudeshwara	76	249	2008	14°05′39.11″N 74°29′6.59″E
Baháʼí House of Worship	Baháʼí House of Worship in Wilmette, Illinois	United States	Wilmette, Illinois	58.2	191	1951	42°4′27″N 87°41′3″W

== Statues ==
Category	Statue	Image	Location	Country	Completed	Height of statue	Height of statue + base	Coordinates
Tallest statue overall (of Vallabhbhai Patel)	Statue of Unity		Sardar Sarovar Dam, Gujarat	India	2018	182 m (597 ft)	240 m (790 ft)	21°50′16.8″N 73°43′08.7″E
Tallest Buddhist statue (of Vairocana)	Spring Temple Buddha		Lushan, Henan	China	2008	128 m (420 ft)	208 m (682 ft)	33°46′30″N 112°27′03″E
Tallest statue of Gautama Buddha	Laykyun Sekkya		Khatakan Taung, near Monywa, Sagaing Division	Myanmar	2008	115.8 m (380 ft)	129.2 m (424 ft)	22.0803°N 95.2893°E
Tallest Hindu statue excluding base (of Shiva)	Statue of Belief		Nathdwara, Rajasthan	India	2020	106 m (348 ft)	112 m (367 ft)	24.9190°N 73.8178°E
Tallest Christian statue (of Mary)	Mother of All Asia – Tower of Peace		Pagkilatan, Batangas City	Philippines	2021	98.15 m (322.0 ft)	98.15 m (322.0 ft)	13.6423°N 121.0433°E
Tallest Hindu statue including base (of Vishnu and Garuda)	Garuda Wisnu Kencana statue		Garuda Wisnu Kencana Cultural Park, Bali	Indonesia	2018	76 m (249 ft)	122 m (400 ft)	8.813951°S 115.166882°E
Tallest statue of Confucius	Confucius of Mount Ni		Mount Ni, Shandong	China	2016	72 m (236 ft)	72 m (236 ft)	35.4955°N 117.2053°E
Tallest statue of Yang'asha	Yang'asha of Guizhou		Guizhou	China	2017	66 m (217 ft)	88 m (289 ft)	26.7370°N 108.4574°E
Tallest statue of Jesus	Jesus Blessed Sibea-bea		Sibea-bea, North Sumatra	Indonesia	2024	61 m (200 ft)	69 m (226 ft)	2.550703°N 98.671968°E

== By continent ==
Tallest structures supported by land:

Category	Structure	Country	Location	Height	Years	Coordinates
Asian structure, also tallest Asian building	Burj Khalifa	United Arab Emirates	Dubai	830 m (2,723 ft)	2009	25°11′50″N 55°16′27″E
European structure (destroyed)	Warsaw radio mast	Poland	Gąbin	646 m (2,119 ft)	1974-1991	52°22′3.74″N 19°48′8.73″E
North American structure	KRDK-TV mast (previously 629 m with flagpole)	United States	Traill County, North Dakota	627.8 m (2,060 ft)	1998	47°16′45″N 97°20′26″W
North American building	One World Trade Center	United States	New York, New York	541 m (1,776 ft)	2014	40°42′47″N 74°00′48″W
European existing structure	Ostankino Tower	Russia	Moscow	540 m (1,772 ft)	1967	55°49′11″N 37°36′42″E
European building	Lakhta Center	Russia	Saint Petersburg	462 m (1,516 ft)	2019	59°59′13″N 30°10′41″E
Oceanian structure	VLF transmitter Lualualei	United States	Lualualei, Hawaii	458 m (1,503 ft)	1972	21°25′11.87″N 158°08′53.67″W
Australian structure (destroyed)	VLF Transmitter Woodside	Australia	Woodside, Victoria	432 m (1,417 ft)	1981-2015	38.481228°S 146.935294°E
African structure (destroyed)	Chabrier OMEGA Transmitter	France	Saint-Paul, Réunion	428 m (1,404 ft)	1974-1999	20°58′27″S 55°17′24″E
African existing structure, also tallest African building	Iconic Tower	Egypt	The New Capital	394 m (1,293 ft)	2024	30°0′46″N 31°41′38″E
Australian existing structure	Naval Communication Station Harold E. Holt	Australia	Exmouth, Western Australia	387 m (1,270 ft)	1967	21°48′59″S 114°9′56″E
South American structure (destroyed)	Omega Tower Trelew	Argentina	Golfo Nuevo	366 m (1,201 ft)	1971-1998	43.053553°S 65.190781°W
South American existing structure	Amazon Tall Tower Observatory	Brazil	São Sebastião do Uatumã	325 m (1,066 ft)	2015	2.1430°S 59.0010°W
Oceanian building	Q1	Australia	Gold Coast	322.5 m (1,058 ft)	2005	28°00′22″S 153°25′46″E
South American building	Gran Torre Santiago	Chile	Santiago	300 m (984 ft)	2014	33°25′01″S 70°36′24″W

== See also ==
- List of tallest buildings
- List of tallest structures
- History of the world's tallest buildings
- History of the world's tallest structures
