= List of tallest industrial buildings =

Following is a list of the tallest industrial buildings.

Current as of August, 2020
Name	Type of structure	Country	Location	Height	Year completed	Remarks
Niederaussem Power Station	Power Station	Germany	Bergheeim	564 ft (172 m)	2002	
Neurath Power Station BoA 2	Power Station	Germany	Grevenbroich	558 ft (170 m)	2012	Alternative source claims the structure is 567 ft (173 m) tall
Neurath Power Station BoA 3	Power Station	Germany	Grevenbroich	558 ft (170 m)	2012	Alternative source claims the structure is 567 ft (173 m) tall
Lippendorf Power Station Unit 1	Power Station	Germany	Lippendorf	558 ft (170 m)	2000	
Lippendorf Power Station Unit 2	Power Station	Germany	Lippendorf	558 ft (170 m)	2000	
Schwarze Pumpe power station	Power Station	Germany	Spremberg	528 ft (161 m)	2000	The steam generator has an observation deck on its top
Vehicle Assembly Building	Integration facility	United States	Titusville	526 ft (160 m)	1966	

== See also ==
- List of tallest buildings and structures
- List of tallest chimneys
- List of tallest dams
- List of tallest oil platforms
- List of tallest cooling towers
- List of elevator test towers
- Lattice towers
