= List of least carbon efficient power stations =

This is a list of least carbon efficient power stations in selected countries. Lists were created by the WWF and lists the most polluting power stations in terms of the level of carbon dioxide produced per unit of electricity generated. In general lignite burning coal-fired power stations with subcritical boilers (in which bubbles form in contrast to the newer supercritical steam generator) emit the most. The Chinese national carbon trading scheme may follow the European Union Emission Trading Scheme in making such power stations uneconomic to run. However some companies such as NLC India Limited and Electricity Generation Company (Turkey) generate in countries without a carbon price. Lignite power stations built or retrofitted before 1995 often also emit local air pollution. In early 2021 the EU carbon price rose above 50 euros per tonne, causing many of the European plants listed below to become unprofitable, and close down. However, because many countries outside Europe and the USA do not publish plant level emissions data it was difficult to make up to date lists. Public information from space-based measurements of carbon dioxide by Climate Trace is expected to quantify CO_{2} from individual large plants before the 2021 United Nations Climate Change Conference, thus enabling large polluters to be identified.

== 2015 report - companies ==
In 2015 the Stranded Assets Programme at the University of Oxford’s Smith School of Enterprise and the Environment published Stranded Assets and Subcritical Coal report analyzing inter alia carbon intensity of subcritical coal-fired power stations of 100 largest companies having these power stations.

CO_{2} intensity (kg/kWh)	Company	Country	Number of SCPS
1.447	NLC India Limited	India	2
1.342	Madhya Pradesh Power Generation Company Limited	India	3
1.279	GDF Suez	France	10
1.277	Kazakhmys	Kazakhstan	4
1.269	West Bengal Power Development Corporation	India	5
1.253	OGK-2	Russia	4
1.243	Maharashtra State Power Generation Company	India	7
1.240	Electricity Generating Authority of Thailand	Thailand	4
1.226	Termoelectrica	Romania	17
1.222	RAO UES	Russia	23
1.220	ČEZ Group	Czech Republic	13

== 2005 report - power station from 30 industrialised countries ==
CO_{2} intensity (kg/kWh)	Power station	Country	Note
1.58	Hazelwood Power Station, Victoria	Australia	closed in 2017
1.56	Edwardsport IGCC, Edwardsport, Indiana	United States	closed in 2012
1.27	Frimmersdorf power plant, Grevenbroich	Germany	closed in 2017
1.25	HR Milner Generating Station, Grande Cache, Alberta,	Canada	converted to gas in 2020
1.18	Emilio Portes Gil, Río Bravo	Mexico	
1.09	Bełchatów Power Station, Bełchatów	Poland	
1.07	Prunéřov Power Station, Kadaň	Czech Republic	partially closed
1.02	Niihamanishi, Niihama	Japan	

== 2007 list - Europe ==
CO_{2} intensity (kg/kWh)	Power Station, Location	Country	Fuel	Emissions (MtCO_{2})
1.350	Agios Dimitrios Power Station, Agios Dimitrios, Kozani	Greece	Lignite	12.4
1.250	Kardia Power Station, Kardia Kozanis	Greece	Lignite	8.8
1.200	Niederaussem Power Station, Niederaussem	Germany	Lignite	27.4
1.200	Jänschwalde Power Station, Jänschwalde	Germany	Lignite	23.7
1.187	Frimmersdorf Power Station, Grevenbroich	Germany	Lignite	19.3
1.180	Weisweiler Power Station, Eschweiler	Germany	Lignite	18.8
1.150	Neurath Power Station, Grevenbroich	Germany	Lignite	17.9
1.150	Turów Power Station, Bogatynia	Poland	Lignite	13.0
1.150	As Pontes Power Station, Ferrol	Spain	Lignite	9.1
1.100	Boxberg Power Station, Boxberg, Saxony	Germany	Lignite	15.5
1.090	Bełchatów Power Station, Bełchatów	Poland	Lignite	30.1
1.070	Prunéřov Power Station, Prunéřov	Czech Republic	Lignite	8.9
1.050	Sines Power Station, Sines	Portugal	Hard Coal	8.7
1.000	Schwarze Pumpe power station, Spremberg	Germany	Lignite	12.2

== 2018 - largest emitters ==
The table lists the largest emitters, regardless of their carbon efficiency.

CO_{2} intensity (kg/kWh)	Power Station	Country	2018 emissions (MtCO_{2})
1.8	Bełchatów	Poland	38
1.5	Vindhyachal	India	34
1.5	Dangjin	South Korea	34
1.5	Taean	South Korea	31
1.3	Taichung	Taiwan	30
1.5	Tuoketuo	China	30
1.5	Niederaussem	Germany	27
1.4	Sasan	India	27
1.5	Yonghungdo	South Korea	27
1.4	Hekinan	Japan	27

== Other ==
At over 1.34 tCO2-e/MWh Yallourn is the most carbon intense in Australia.

In the very unlikely event of being built, the proposed Afşin-Elbistan C power station would become the least carbon efficient coal-fired power station.

== Sources ==
- Boom and Bust 2021: Tracking The Global Coal Plant Pipeline (Report). Global Energy Monitor. 2021-04-05.
