= List of tallest cooling towers =

This is a list of cooling towers above 500 ft / 150 m.

== List of tallest cooling towers ==
indicates a structure that is no longer standing.

Current as of August 2020
Name	Type of structure	Country	Location	Height	Year completed	Remarks
Pingshan II Power Station	Coal power station	China	Huaibei	689 ft (210 m)	2020	
Kalisindh Thermal Power Station, Unit 1 cooling tower	Coal power station	India	Jhalawar	663 ft (202 m)	2012	
Kalisindh Thermal Power Station, Unit 2 cooling tower	Coal power station	India	Jhalawar	663 ft (202 m)	2012	
Niederaussem Power Station	Coal power station	Germany	Bergheim	656 ft (200 m)	2002	
Vogtle Electric Generating Plant Unit 3 & 4	Nuclear power station	United States	Burke County, Georgia	600 ft (180 m)	2022	
Walsum power plant	Coal power station	Germany	Duisburg	594 ft (181 m)	2008	
Bełchatów Power Station, new unit	Coal power station	Poland	Bełchatów	591 ft (180 m)	2011	
THTR-300	Nuclear power plant	Germany	Hamm-Uentrop	590 ft (180 m)	1985	Tallest cooling towers built from steel, demolished in 1991, tallest of any kind to be demolished
Civaux Nuclear Power Plant, cooling tower 1	Nuclear power plant	France	Civaux	589 ft (180 m)	1996	Base diameter of 153 m / 502 ft
Civaux Nuclear Power Plant, cooling tower 2	Nuclear power plant	France	Civaux	589 ft (180 m)	1996	Base diameter of 153 m / 502 ft
Cooling towers of Golfech Nuclear Power Plant	Nuclear power plant	France	Golfech	586 ft (179 m)		2 cooling towers, base diameter of 146 m / 479 ft
Datteln Power Station	Coal power station	Germany	Datteln	584 ft (178 m)	2009	
Lippendorf Power Station Unit 1	Coal power station	Germany	Lippendorf	574 ft (175 m)	2000	
Lippendorf Power Station Unit 2	Coal power station	Germany	Lippendorf	574 ft (175 m)	2000	
Cooling towers of Chooz Nuclear Power Plant	Nuclear power plant	France	Chooz	564 ft (172 m)		2 cooling towers, base diameter of 153 m / 502 ft
Neurath Power Station BoA 2	Coal power station	Germany	Grevenbroich	564 ft (172 m)	2012	
Neurath Power Station BoA 3	Coal power station	Germany	Grevenbroich	564 ft (172 m)	2012	
Novovoronezsh Nuclear power plant, Unit II-1	Nuclear power plant	Russia	Voronezh Oblast	561 ft (171 m)	2013	
Novovoronezsh Nuclear power plant, Unit II-2	Nuclear power plant	Russia	Voronezh Oblast	561 ft (171 m)	2014	
Doel Nuclear Power Station, cooling tower 1	Nuclear power plant	Belgium	Beveren	554 ft (169 m)	1975	
Doel Nuclear Power Station, cooling tower 2	Nuclear power plant	Belgium	Beveren	554 ft (169 m)	1975	
Callaway Nuclear Generating Station	Nuclear power plant	United States	Fulton, MO	553 ft (169 m)	1984	Base diameter of 131 m / 430 ft
Vogtle Electric Generating Plant Unit #1	Nuclear power station	United States	Burke County, Georgia	548 ft (167 m)	1976	
Vogtle Electric Generating Plant Unit #2	Nuclear power station	United States	Burke County, Georgia	548 ft (167 m)	1976	
Leningrad Nuclear Power Plant, Unit II-2	Nuclear power plant	Russia	Leningrad oblast	548 ft (167 m)	2018	
Westphalia Power Plant, Unit D cooling tower	Coal power station	Germany	Hamm	546 ft (166 m)	2009	
Westphalia Power Plant, Unit E cooling tower	Coal power station	Germany	Hamm	546 ft (166 m)	2009	
Nine Mile Point Nuclear Generating Station	Nuclear power plant	United States	Scriba, NY	543 ft (166 m)	1988	
Cooling towers of Belleville Nuclear Power Plant	Nuclear power plant	France	Belleville-sur-Loire	541 ft (165 m)		2 cooling towers, base diameter of 147 m / 482 ft
Cooling towers of Cattenom Nuclear Power Plant	Nuclear power plant	France	Cattenom	541 ft (165 m)		4 cooling towers, base diameter of 205 m / 673 ft
Cooling towers of Dampierre Nuclear Power Plant	Nuclear power plant	France	Dampierre-en-Burly	541 ft (165 m)		4 cooling towers, base diameter of 131 m / 430 ft
Cooling towers of Nogent Nuclear Power Plant	Nuclear power plant	France	Nogent-sur-Seine	541 ft (165 m)		2 cooling towers, base diameter of 147 m / 482 ft
Hartsville Nuclear Plant	Nuclear power plant	United States	Hartsville, Tennessee	540 ft (160 m)	1983	demolished in 2025 - Cancelled nuclear power plant, reactors partially completed. Tallest concrete cooling tower to ever be explosively demolished.
Mülheim-Kärlich Nuclear Power Plant	Nuclear power plant	Germany	Mülheim-Kärlich	532 ft (162 m)	1978	dismantled in 2019 by use of an excavator
Plant Scherer Unit #1	Coal power station	United States	Juliette, Georgia	531 ft (162 m)	1982	
Plant Scherer Unit #2	Coal power station	United States	Juliette, Georgia	531 ft (162 m)	1984	
Plant Scherer Unit #3	Coal power station	United States	Juliette, Georgia	531 ft (162 m)	1987	
Plant Scherer Unit #4	Coal power station	United States	Juliette, Georgia	531 ft (162 m)	1989	
Lünen-Stummhafen Trianel Power Plant	Coal power station	Germany	Lünen	525 ft (160 m)	2009	
Gundremmingen Nuclear Power Plant, cooling tower 1	Nuclear power plant	Germany	Gundremmingen	525 ft (160 m)	1984	demolished by explosives 2025-10-25
Gundremmingen Nuclear Power Plant, cooling tower 2	Nuclear power plant	Germany	Gundremmingen	525 ft (160 m)	1984	demolished by explosives 2025-10-25
Torre de refrigeración de Central nuclear de Ascó	Nuclear power plant	Spain	Ascó	525 ft (160 m)	?	Base diameter of 120 m / 393 ft
Temelín Nuclear power plant	Nuclear power plant	Czech Republic	Temelin	525 ft (160 m)	1988	155 meters in height, 4 cooling towers
Cooling towers of Cruas Nuclear Power Plant	Nuclear power plant	France	Cruas	509 ft (155 m)		4 cooling towers, base diameter of 132 m / 433 ft
Watts Bar Nuclear Plant, cooling tower 1	Nuclear power plant	United States	Rhea County, TN	506 ft (154 m)	1977	Base diameter of 123 m / 405 ft. Unit 1 did not enter into service until 1996, the cooling towers was completed by 1977
Watts Bar Nuclear Plant, cooling tower 2	Nuclear power plant	United States	Rhea County, TN	506 ft (154 m)	1977	Base diameter of 123 m / 405 ft. Unit 2 did not enter into service until 2016, the cooling towers was completed by 1977
Brayton Point Power Station, cooling tower 1	Coal power plant	United States	Somerset, Massachusetts	500 ft (150 m)	2009	demolished in 2019, tallest concrete cooling towers to be explosively demolished in the US at that time
Brayton Point Power Station, cooling tower 2	Coal power plant	United States	Somerset, Massachusetts	500 ft (150 m)	2009	demolished in 2019
Trojan Nuclear Power Plant	Nuclear power plant	United States	Prescott, Oregon	499 ft (152 m)	1976	demolished in 2006

== See also ==
- List of tallest buildings and structures
