= Frimmersdorf Power Station =

Decommissioned German power station

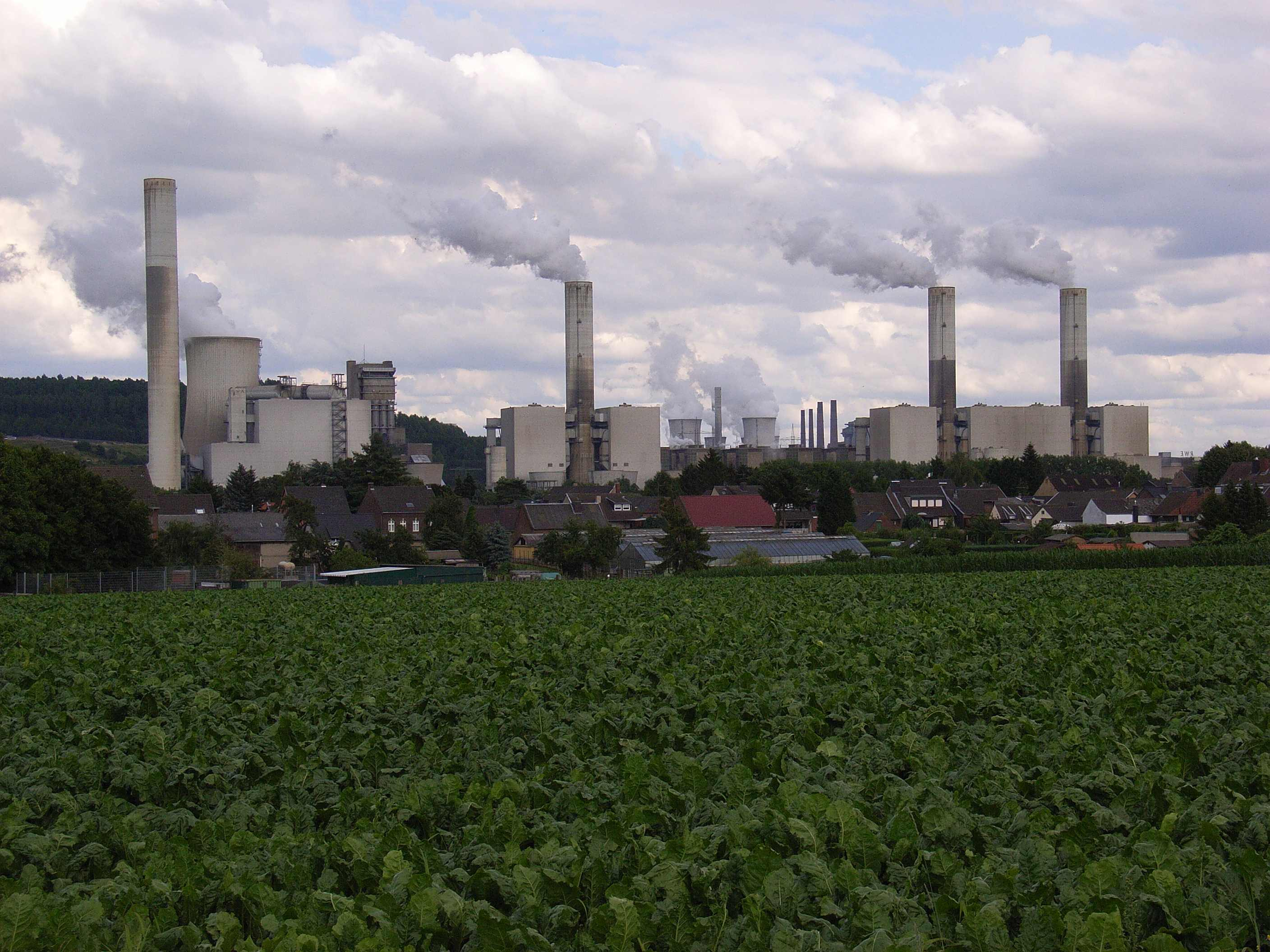
- Power Station Frimmersorf
- Country: Germany
- Location: Grevenbroich
- Coordinates: 51°03′23″N 6°34′37″E
- Status: Decommissioned
- Commission date: 1926
- Decommission date: 2021
- Owner: RWE Power
- Operator: RWE Power

Thermal power station
- Primary fuel: Lignite

Power generation
- Units operational: 14
- Nameplate capacity: 2,413 MW

External links
- Commons: Related media on Commons

Frimmersdorf Power Station, located in Grevenbroich, is a decommissioned lignite-fired power station in Germany. The power station was one of the largest lignite-fired power stations in Germany. It had fourteen units with a total output capacity of 2,413 megawatts (MW). The chimneys of the power station are 200 metres high.

Beginning in 2005, the units in the plant were shut down due to their advanced age and all units had been taken offline by 2018. Only two 300-MW units remained on standby in case of emergencies. The two remaining units were fully decommissioned in September 2021

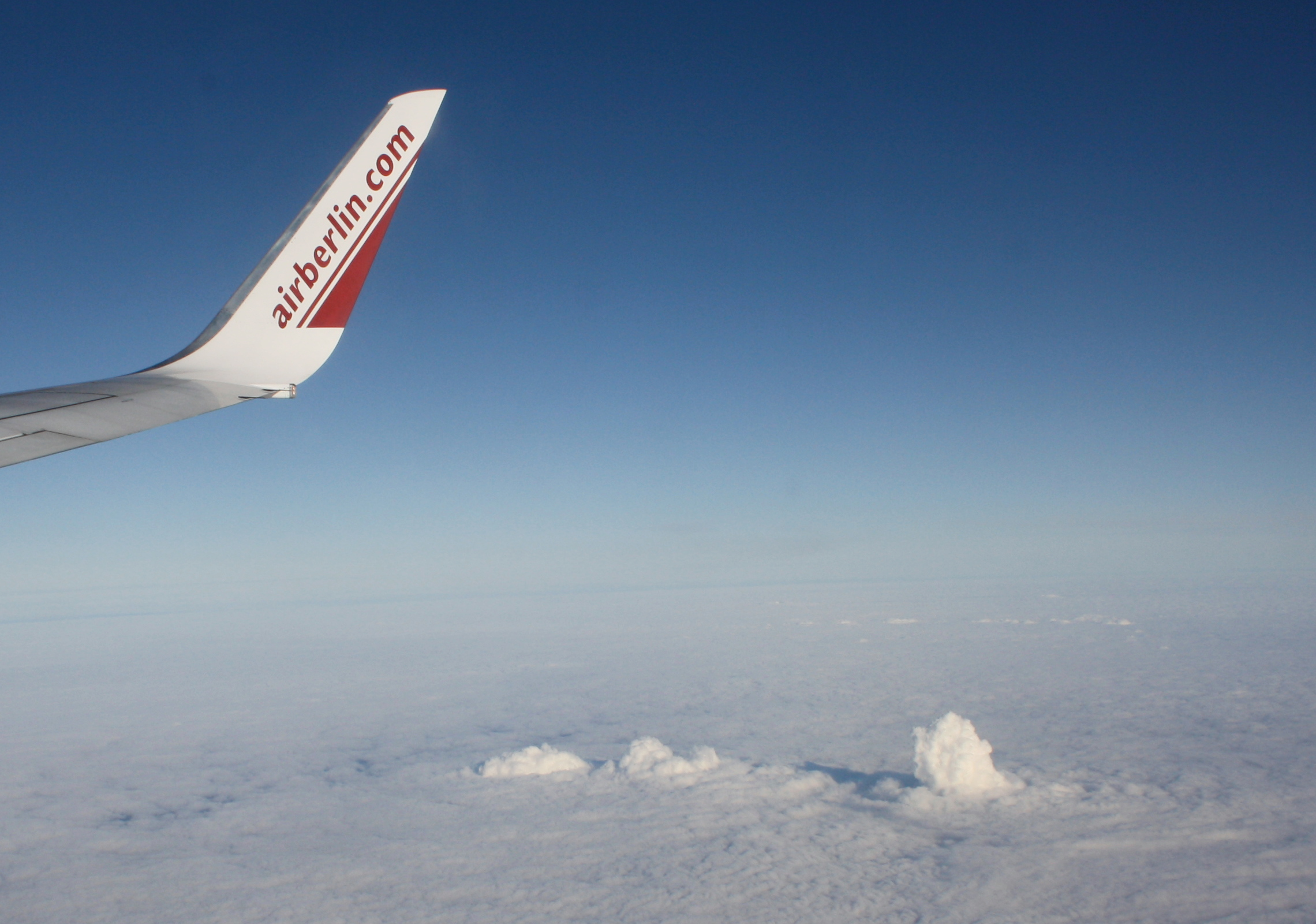
The steam plume rises through the cloud layer

== History ==
The first power station in Frimmersdorf, fired with lignite, was established in 1926 and had an output of 10 MW. It was located ca. 1 km south west of today's power station on the west bank of the Erft river (51.046436°N 6.568097°E). In 1936 the power station was acquired by RWE and after extension work the output raised to 26 MW. After World War II demolitions the power station was back in operation 1946. After further enhancement an output of 90MW was reached in 1951.

In 1954 this was replaced with a much larger plant Frimmersdorf II which initially contained two 100 MW units. Over the next 15 years, this was incrementally upgraded until it supported an additional twelve 150 MW units and two 300 MW units. In 1970 the final configuration of Frimmersdorf II was reached and the power station held the record of the world largest thermal power station.

1988 saw the installation of Flue-gas desulfurization scrubbers, while the two 100 MW units were shut down on 30 June.

Starting in 2005 most of the units were shut down until 2013. Their workload was mainly replaced by new 1100MW units in the neighbouring Neurath Power Station. The two remaining 300MW units were planned to be shut down by October 2017. As of January 2018, the units were taken offline, and kept only as "grid stability emergency reserve". Full decommissioning was planned for October 2021, and the power station was fully decommissioned in September 2021

== Carbon dioxide pollution ==
According to a 2005 WWF report, Frimmersdorf power station was the dirtiest power station in Europe and the third most polluting power station in the industrialised world (based on CO_{2} per megawatt hour sent out).

== See also ==
- List of least carbon efficient power stations
