= Zwenkau =

Town in Leipzig district, Saxony, Germany

- Town
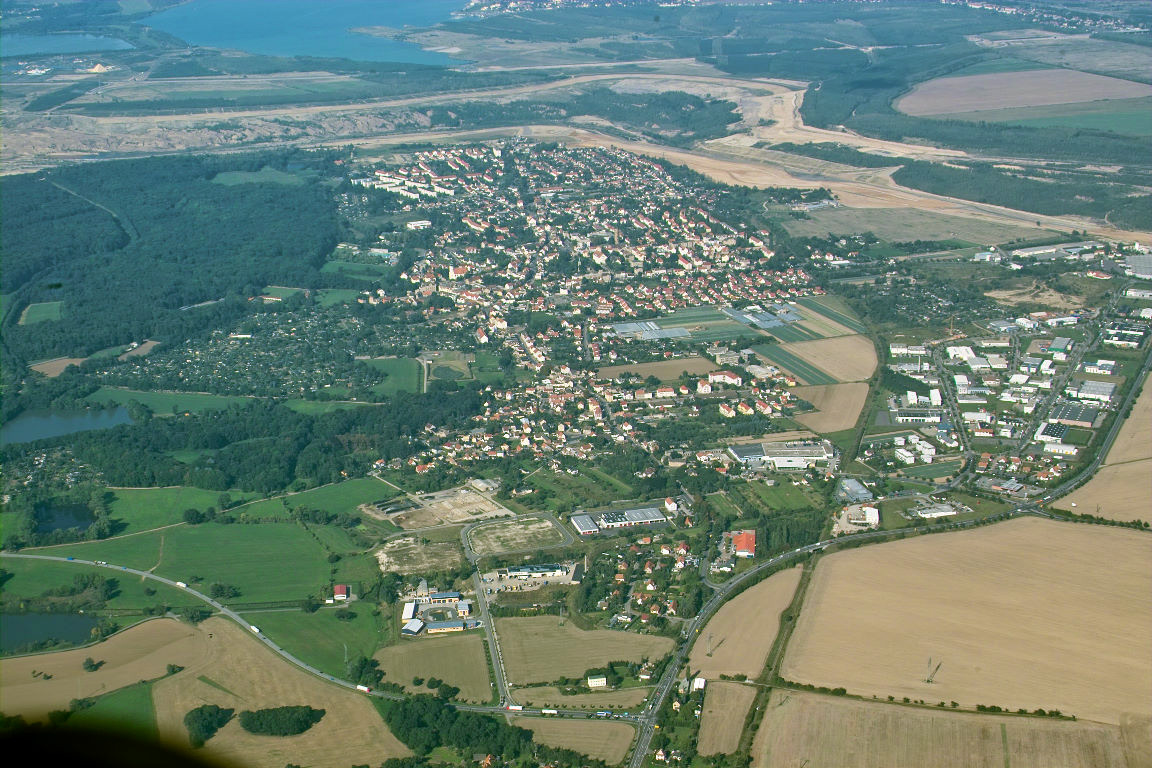
- Aerial view

- Coat of arms

- Location of Zwenkau within Leipzig district
- Interactive map of Zwenkau
- Location within Germany Location within Saxony
- Coordinates: 51°13′3″N 12°19′27″E
- Country: Germany
- State: Saxony
- District: Leipzig
- Subdivisions: 10

Government
  - Mayor (2022–29): Holger Schulz (CDU)

Area
  - Total: 46.3 km^{2} (17.9 sq mi)
- Elevation: 130 m (430 ft)

Population (2025-12-31)
  - Total: 9,452
  - Density: 204/km^{2} (529/sq mi)
- Time zone: UTC+01:00 (CET)
  - Summer (DST): UTC+02:00 (CEST)
- Postal codes: 04442
- Dialling codes: 03 42 03
- Vehicle registration: L, BNA, GHA, GRM, MTL, WUR
- Website: www.zwenkau.de

Zwenkau (German pronunciation: [ˈtsvɛnkaʊ]) is a town in the district of Leipzig, in Saxony, Germany. Situated between the White Elster and Pleiße rivers, it nestles in the Leipzig Bay and includes parts of the conservation area Elsteraue and Central Germany's Street of Lignite. It is situated within the Central German Metropolitan Region.

== Geography ==
The town lies about 15 km south of Leipzig and 3 km northwest of the industrial site Böhlen / Lippendorf with its landmark, Lippendorf Power Station. A former open-cast mine extending from the northeast of Zwenkau to its northwest was set on September 30, 1999 and is currently being rehabilitated and converted to Lake Zwenkau. Several smaller towns and hamlets belong to Zwenkau, being

- the suburbs Kötzschbar, Imnitz and Löbschütz
- the rural towns Großdalzig, Mausitz, Kleindalzig, Tellschütz, and Zitzschen (since October 1, 1993)
- the town Rüssen-Kleinstorkwitz and its hamlet Döhlen (since October 1, 1996)

The rural areas of the historic town Eythra and parts of Bösdorf, both abandoned in favor of lignite deposits in the 1980s, are also administered by the town of Zwenkau and bordered in the west.

== History ==
=== Pre-industrial period ===
Prehistoric colonization in the area of Zwenkau was affirmed by archaeological finds dated around 6000 BC.

Zwenkau is one of the oldest cities in what is now Saxony. As a Slavic settlement, the earliest documentary mention known is in 974 where it is described as Civitas in Gau Chutizi.

[...]

In 1929 the towns Imnitz and Kotzschbar which immediately connected to the south of Zwenkau's urban area were amalgamated.

== Demography ==
In the shadow of Leipzig's development Zwenkau grew slowly. In 1748 almost 90 households were counted, this is equivalent to 450 to 500 inhabitants. After the Seven Years' War the town experienced a commercial boom and the population increased fivefold in less than one-hundred years. So before industrialization in Europe started, 2419 residents were counted in 1834. In the first half of the 20th century Zwenkau developed quickly due to the lignite mining industry and dependent business. From 1950 to 1990 the town lost forty percent of its residents. Since then the population increased mainly as a result of amalgamation of nearby rural towns and hamlets.

Population development
| Year | 1871 | 1890 | 1910 | 1925 | 1939 | 1946 | 1964 | 1990 | 2000 | 2007 |
| Residents | 3058 | 3628 | 4661 | 5283 | 9513 | 11821 | 9800 | 7351 | 8932 | 8859 |

== Local council ==
The elections in May 2014 showed the following results:

- CDU: 9 Seats
- Freie Wählergemeinschaft „Gemeinsam für Zwenkau“ e. V. (GfZ) (Together for Zwenkau): 5 Seats
- SPD: 2 Seats
- The Left: 2 Seats

== Sons and daughters of the city ==
- Adolf Ferdinand Weinhold (1841-1917), professor for physics in Chemnitz, pioneer of the electrification of Saxony and (co-) inventor of the Dewar vessel, from which the principle of the Vacuum flask derives
- Frank Baum (born 1956,) GDR football national player and winner of a silver medal at the 1980 Olympic Games
- Uwe Zötzsche (born 1960), GDR football national player and finalist in the UEFA Cup final in Athens 1987
- Rüdiger Selig (born 1989), cyclist

== Pictures ==
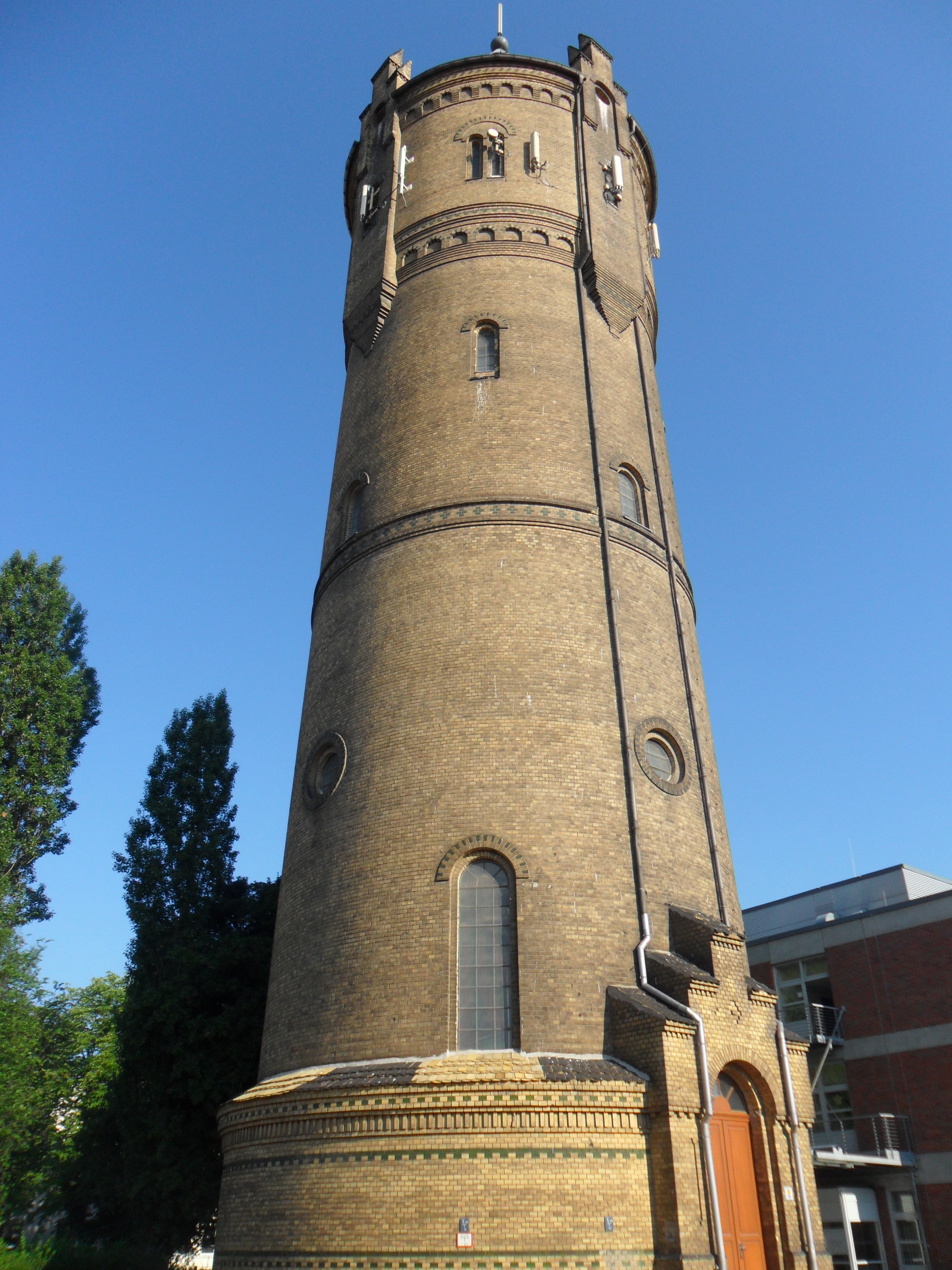
Water tower Zwenkau

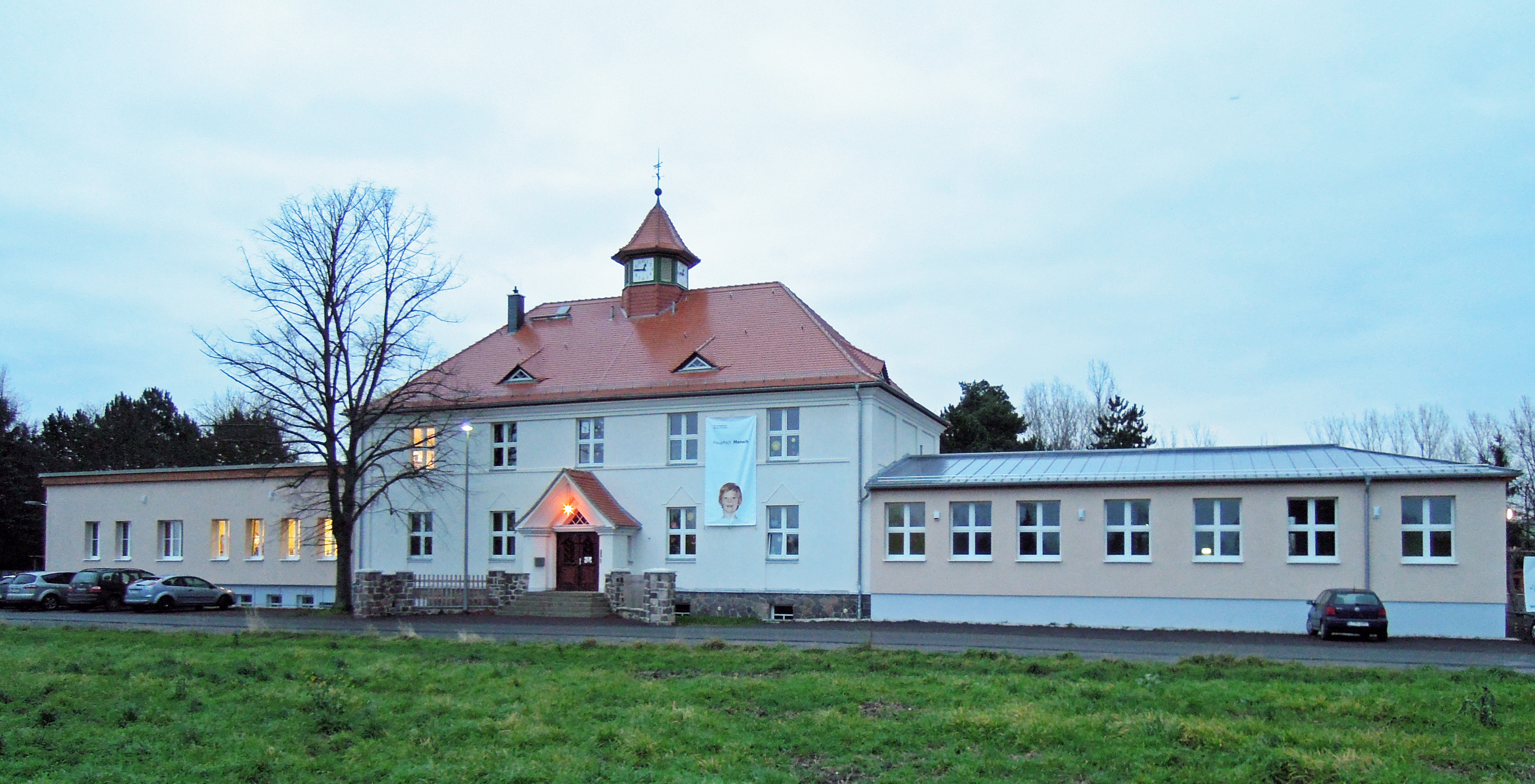
Primary school in Döhlen (Zwenkau)

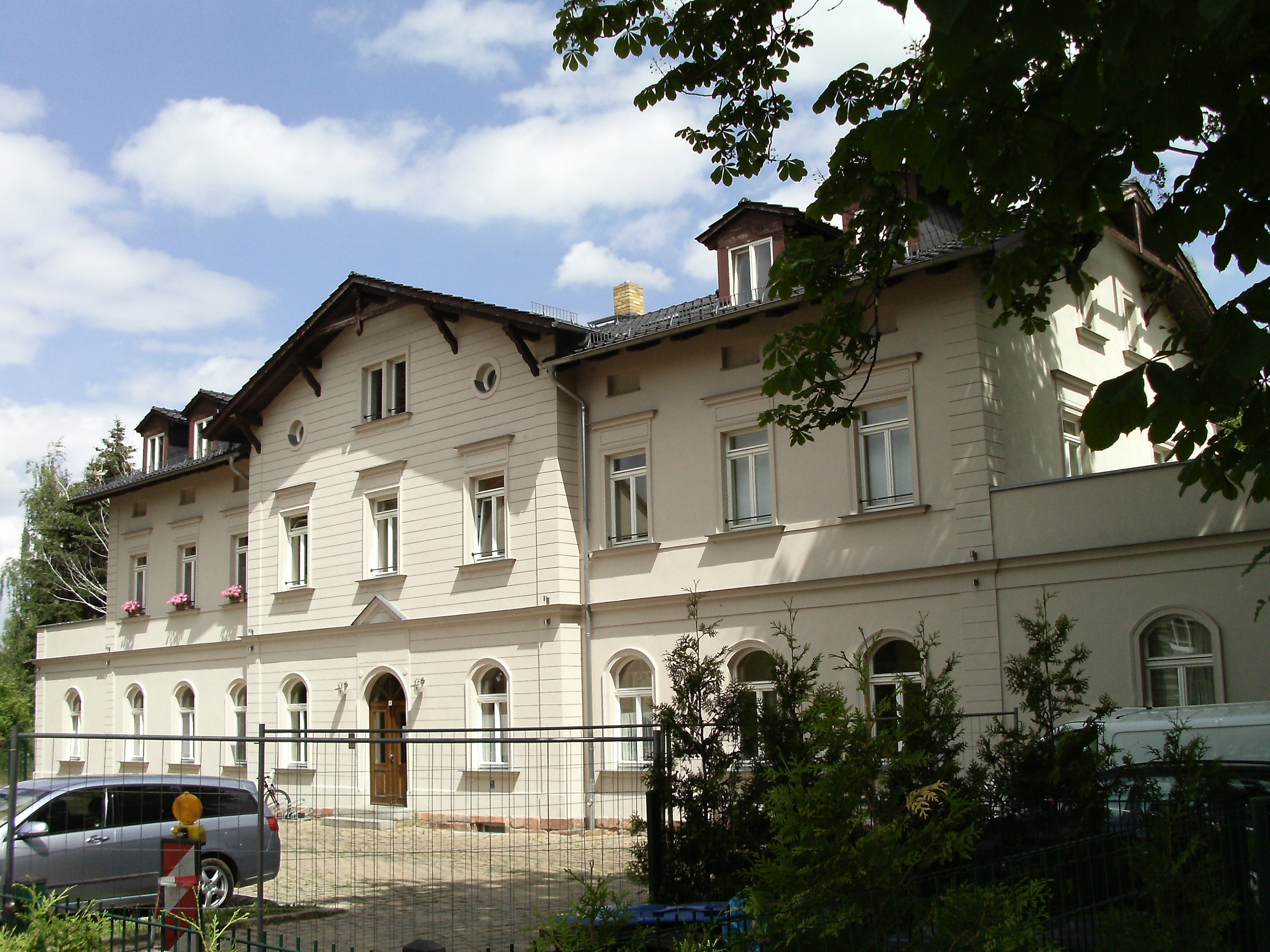
Zwenkau station

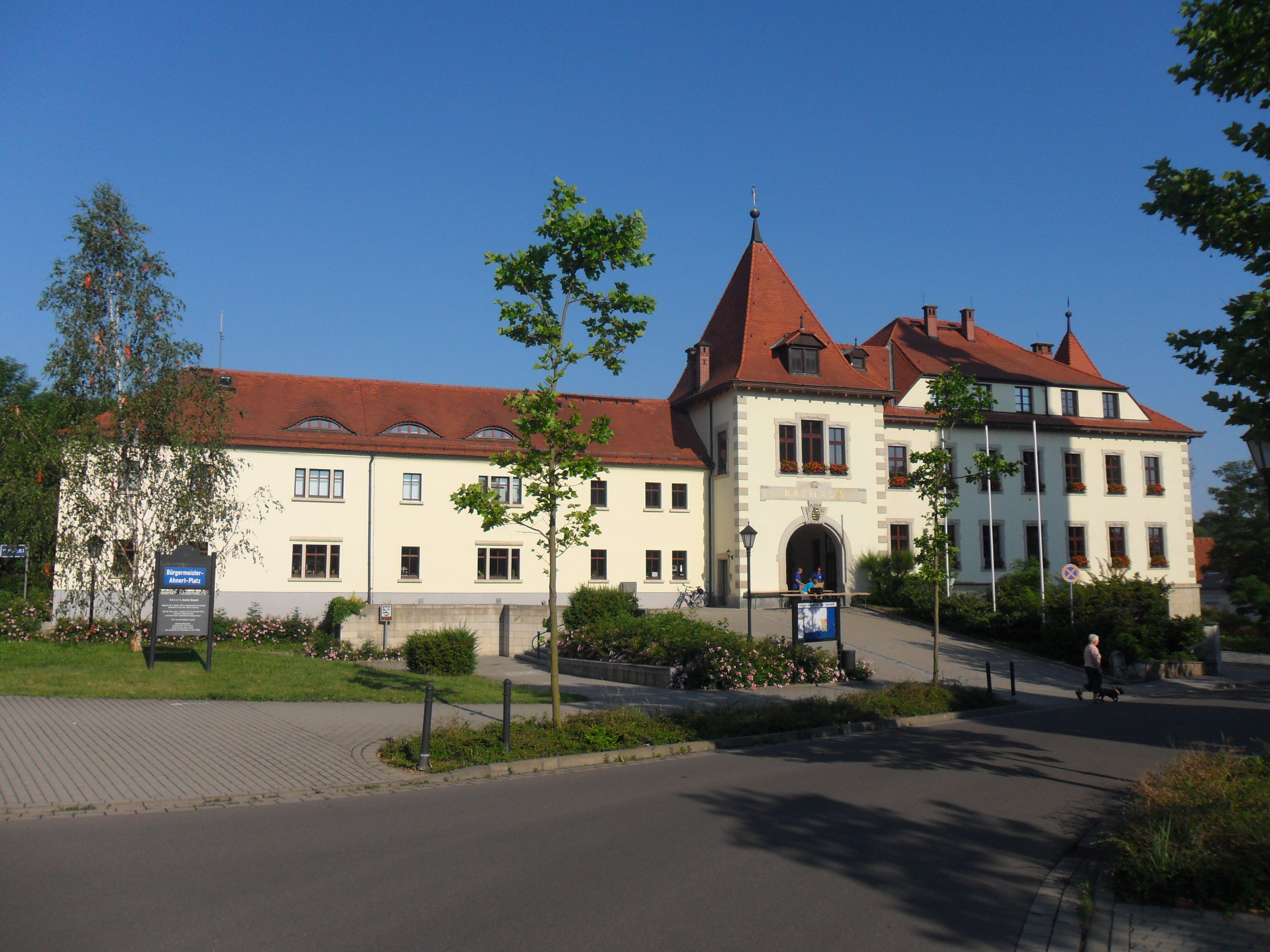
Town hall Zwenkau
