= Kalisindh Thermal Power Station =

Power station in India

- Country: India
- Location: Jhalawar district, Rajasthan, India
- Coordinates: 24°31′54″N 76°05′56″E
- Status: Operational
- Commission date: 2014
- Operator: Rajasthan Rajya Vidyut Utpadan Nigam Ltd (RVUNL)

Thermal power station
- Primary fuel: Coal
- Chimneys: 275 m (902 ft)
- Cooling towers: 2 × 202 m (663 ft)
- Cooling source: Kalisindh Dam reservoir

Power generation
- Units operational: 2 × 600 MW
- Nameplate capacity: 1,200 MW

Kalisindh Thermal Power Station is a 1,200 MW coal-fired power station in the state of Rajasthan in western India. It is located 12 kilometres (7.5 mi) from Jhalawar town in Jhalawar district. The plant consists of two 600 MW generating units, both commissioned in 2014. The power station is operated by Rajasthan Rajya Vidyut Utpadan Nigam Ltd (RVUNL).

Water for the plant is supplied by the Kalisindh Dam reservoir near Bhanwarasi village. Coal for the station will be sourced from the Paras East and Kanta Basin coal blocks in Chhattisgarh state.

The plant's chimney has a height of 275 metres (902 ft). When they were built in 2012, the plant's two 202-metre (663 ft) cooling towers were the tallest in the world, slightly exceeding the 200-metre (656 ft) cooling tower at the Niederaussem Power Station in Germany, which had held the record since its completion in 2002. However, Pingshan Power Station's Unit 2 has since surpassed this, with its 210-metre (689 ft) cooling tower now the tallest in the world as of January 2026. The EPC contractor for the project is BGR Energy Systems Ltd.

== Installed capacity ==
The following chart shows the plant's units, their electrical generation capacity and their date of commissioning.

Stage	Unit number	Installed capacity (MW)	Date of commissioning	Status
Stage I	1	600	March 2014	Running
Stage I	2	600	June 2014	Running

== See also ==
- Energy in India
- List of tallest cooling towers
- List of power stations in India
