= Niederaussem Power Station =

Lignite-fired power plant in Germany

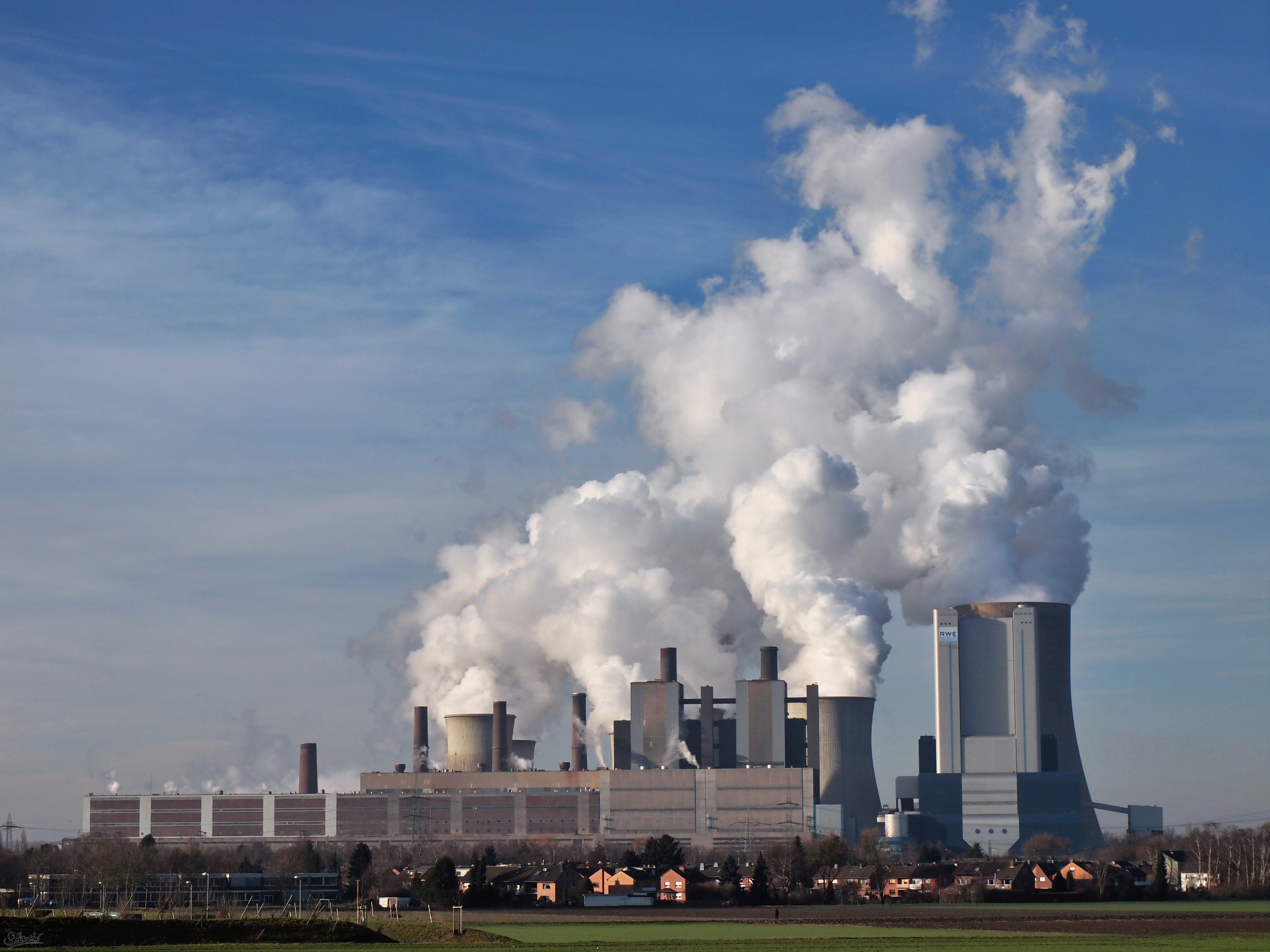
- Niederaussem Power Station in 2011
- Country: Germany
- Location: Niederaussem, Bergheim
- Coordinates: 50°59′44″N 06°40′09″E
- Status: Commissioned
- Commission date: 1965
- Owner: RWE Power
- Operator: RWE Power

Thermal power station
- Primary fuel: Lignite

Power generation
- Units operational: 3
- Units decommissioned: 6
- Nameplate capacity: 2,220 MW

External links
- Commons: Related media on Commons

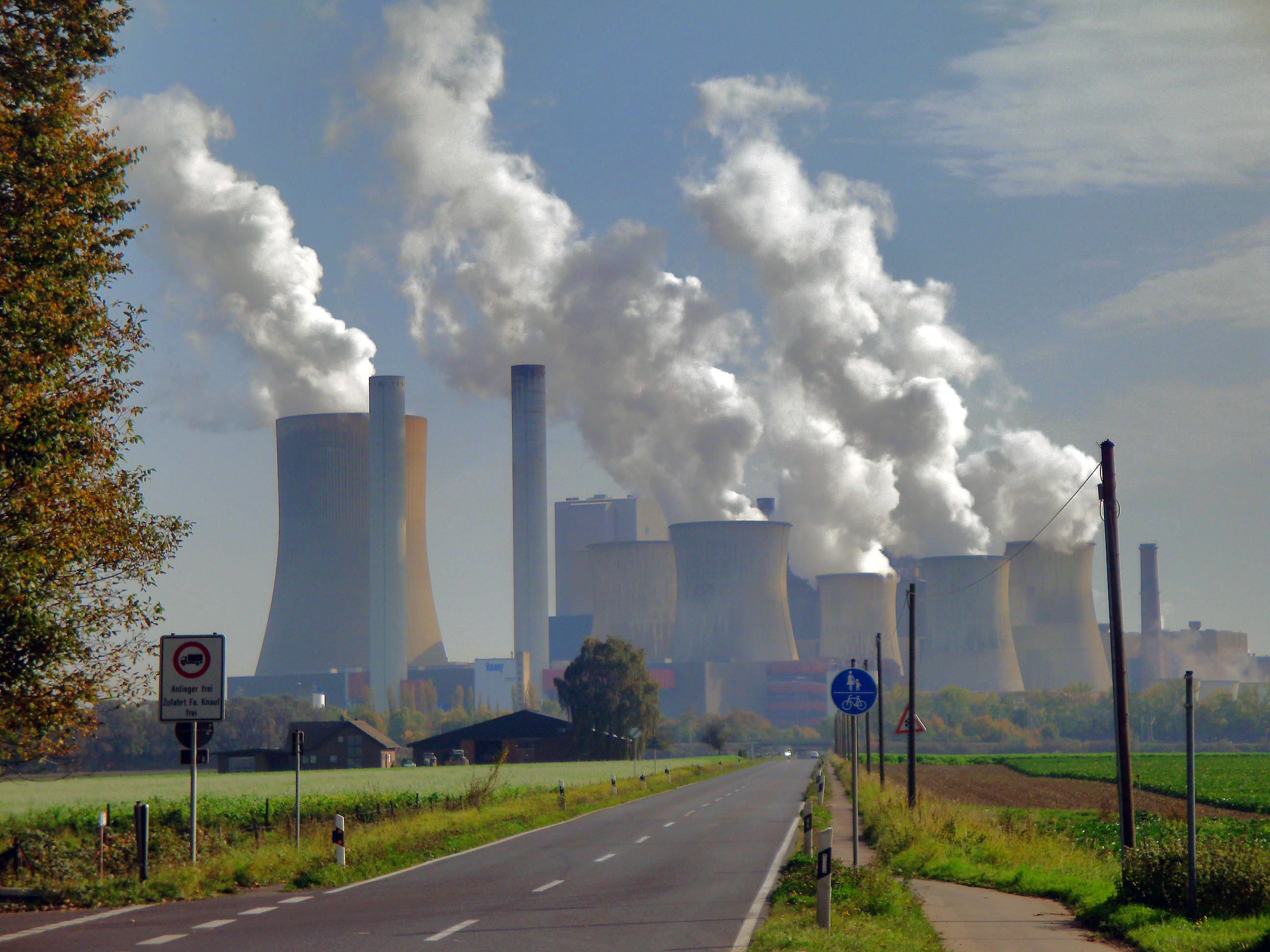
The power station

Niederaussem Power Station is a lignite-fired power station in the Niederaussem district of Bergheim, in the Rhein-Erft-Kreis of North Rhine‑Westphalia, Germany. It is owned by RWE. Nine generating units were commissioned at the site between 1963 and 2003. Following the closure of units E and F in March 2024, three units remained in operation: G, H and K. Their combined net generating capacity is 2,220 MW.

In 2018 the plant was estimated to be among the ten most carbon-polluting coal-fired power stations in the world, emitting 27.2 million tonnes of carbon dioxide. Its emissions intensity (kgCO_{2} per MWh generated) is estimated to be 45.1% higher than the average for all fossil-fuelled plants in Germany. According to the Dirty Thirty study issued by WWF in 2007, Niederaussem Power Station was the second-worst power station in Europe for mercury emissions, owing to its reliance on lignite. It is also among the world's least carbon-efficient power stations, producing approximately 1.2 kg of CO_{2} per kilowatt-hour generated as of 2007.

== History ==
=== Initial construction ===
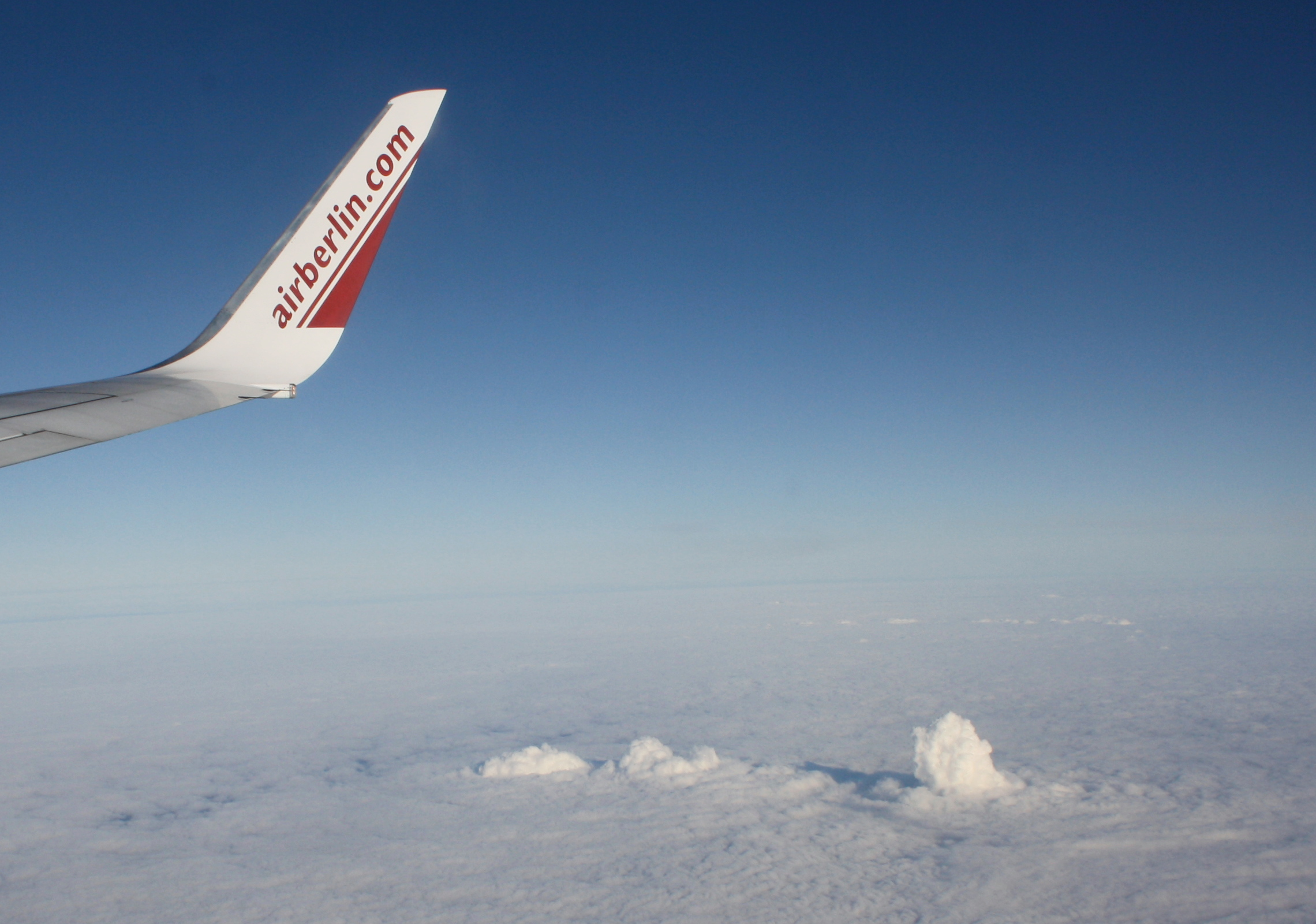
The plume clouds from the cooling towers break through the cloud layer.

Construction of blocks A and B (150 MW each) began in the autumn of 1960. The site was chosen because it offered ample space for future expansion. The supply of lignite was secured by the north-south running "Garzweiler" seams. Units A and B entered service in 1963. Before blocks A and B first generated power, construction had already begun on the first 300-MW unit at the Niederaussem site. That unit entered operation in the summer of 1965.

Between 1968 and 1971, three additional units incorporating improved technology were built. A major step forward came with the construction of two 600-MW units, which were synchronised to the grid in 1974. By that time, the units at Niederaussem had a combined output of 2,700 MW.

=== Mid-1990s ===
In the mid-1990s, the plant's output was increased once again. To meet the limit values introduced by new environmental protection regulations, construction of a flue-gas desulphurisation plant began in 1986 and was completed in 1988. The flue gases are fed into scrubbers and cleaned using a lime-water mixture. The cleaned and cooled exhaust is then reheated to 75 °C (167 °F) and discharged into the outside air through the chimneys. During flue-gas purification, gypsum is produced from the lime-water mixture; this by-product is processed next to the power station in Auenheim by the company Pro Mineral.

=== 1997 to present ===
With the construction of the new BoA block (Braunkohlekraftwerk mit optimierter Anlagentechnik—German for "lignite power station with optimised system technology"), a new chapter began at the power station. Between 1997 and 2002, it was the most modern brown-coal power-station unit in the world, with a gross output of 1,012 MW (950 MW net) and a significantly higher efficiency (43%) than most other plants, some of which operated at efficiencies as low as 31%. RWE invested €1.2 billion in the project.

The new power-block building is 172 metres (564 ft) tall and is the tallest industrial building in the world. Its cooling tower was also the tallest in the world at 200 metres (660 ft) when completed, although it is now the third-tallest, after those at the Pingshan Power Station in China and the Kalisindh Thermal Power Station in India. These developments made Niederaussem one of the largest and most modern coal-fired power stations in the world. The official opening of the new block took place in the summer of 2002.

Since 21 July 2006, RWE has invested €40 million in constructing a fluidised-bed drying unit with waste-heat technology as a pilot project for drying raw brown coal. The process also makes use of the power station's available waste heat.

The older units at the plant have been progressively decommissioned since the early 2010s. Units A and B were taken out of service at the end of 2012. In 2019 RWE cancelled a planned 1,200 MW upgrade. Unit D was decommissioned on 31 December 2020, followed by Unit C on 31 December 2021. Units E and F were decommissioned on 31 March 2024.

=== Planned closure ===
RWE’s August 2025 closure plan lists units G and H for decommissioning on 31 December 2029 and unit K on 31 March 2030. The statutory schedule also provides for a reserve arrangement: one of units G and H is listed for final closure on 31 December 2029, while the other is listed for provisional closure on that date and final closure on 31 December 2033. During provisional closure, the unit would be available only for specified transmission-system-operator requirements and agreed test starts, rather than ordinary electricity-market operation. Section 50 of the Coal-fired Power Generation Termination Act provides for final closure by the end of 2029 if the statutory 2026 review finds that the reserve arrangement is unnecessary.

=== Site Redevelopment ===
On 23 March 2026, Bergheim’s city council approved a redevelopment framework for the approximately 240-hectare Niederaussem power-station area. The framework was prepared by Perspektive.Struktur.Wandel GmbH, a joint venture of the state of North Rhine-Westphalia and RWE Power, together with the city. It envisages an initial development area of approximately 40 hectares, including a proposed digital-business park, with development beginning on available land while the power station remains in operation. A broader transformation of the site into a mixed-use urban district is envisaged from around 2040.

== 2006 fire ==
On 9 June 2006 at 01:15, a fire broke out in Block H of the coaling station. The fire spread to two additional coaling-station blocks. Soon afterwards, the flames had engulfed nearly the entire area of the "old power station", and a large black smoke cloud rose and drifted several kilometres to the north-west. The power station's own fire brigade was unable to bring the fire under control and raised the alarm. Around 300 emergency personnel from across the country responded. The damage to property amounted to tens of millions.

Even by late evening the following day, the fire had not been fully extinguished. Its spread was limited by recently developed fire-prevention measures in other parts of the power station, so that only the coaling station was affected.

== See also ==
- List of least carbon-efficient power stations
- List of power stations in Germany
- List of tallest cooling towers
- Neurath Power Station
- North-South industrial spur
