= Adolf Ferdinand Weinhold =

German chemist and physician (1841–1917)

- Born: 19 May 1841; Zwenkau, Kingdom of Saxony
- Died: 1 July 1917 (aged 76); Chemnitz, Kingdom of Saxony, German Empire
- Citizenship: German
- Scientific career
- Fields: Chemist

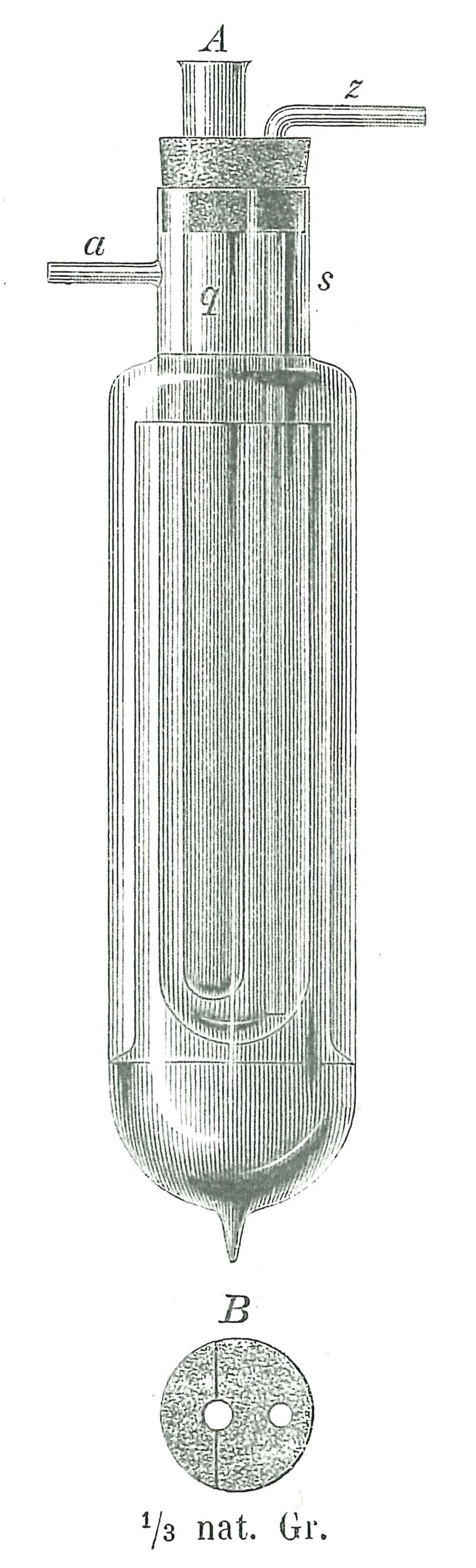
From Weinhold 1881 described vacuum flask

Adolf Ferdinand Weinhold (19 May 1841 – 1 July 1917) was a German chemist, physician and inventor.

== Life ==
From 1857 to 1861 Weinhold studied chemistry and physics at universities in Göttingen and in Leipzig. His mentors were Otto Linné Erdmann and Friedrich Wöhler. In Germany, Weinhold worked after university studies as chemist and physician. He was appointed professor at Chemnitz University of Technology in 1870. In 1873 he was granted a D. Phil from the University of Leipzig.

In 1881, he applied the vacuum flask of James Dewar to chemistry, using it as a cold trap. The flask itself was patented in 1903 by the glassblower Reinhold Burger, who founded Thermos GmbH on its basis.

== Works by Weinhold ==
- Leitfaden für den physikalischen Unterricht (24 editions)
- Physikalische Demonstrationen – Anleitung zum Experimentieren im Unterricht an Gymnasien, Realschulen und Gewerbschulen (7 editions)
- Vorschule der Experimentalphysik – Naturlehre in elementarer Darstellung nebst Anleitung zur Ausfertigung der Apparate (5 editions)
- Weinhold, Adolf Ferdinand (1875). Introduction to Experimental Physics, Theoretical and Practical: Including Directions for Constructing Physical Apparatus and for Making Experiments. Benjamin Loewy (translator). London: Longmans, Green, and Company.
