= Kalisindh Dam =

Gravity dam across the Kali Sindh River in Rajasthan, India

- Location within Rajasthan Location within India
- Country: India
- Location: Jhalawar
- Coordinates: 24°48′24.9″N 76°22′41.5″E
- Purpose: Irrigation, Water storage
- Status: Operational
- Construction began: 2010
- Opening date: 2014
- Owners: Water Resources Department, Rajasthan

Dam and spillways
- Type of dam: Concrete Gravity
- Impounds: Kali Sindh River
- Height: 316 m (1,037 ft)
- Length: 995 m (3,264 ft)
- Spillway type: Oghee

Reservoir
- Creates: Kalisindh Resorvoir
- Active capacity: 54,200,000 m^{3} (43,900 acre⋅ft)
- Catchment area: 7,547 km^{2} (2,914 mi^{2})

Kalisindh Dam is a concrete gravity dam across Kali Sindh River. It is situated near Jetpura village which is 16 km from Jhalawar, Rajasthan, India. It is built primarily for providing water for irrigation to nearby villages, control annual floods in Kali Sindh River and uplift water to storage of 1200 mcft water for Kalisindh Thermal Power Station.

The dam has the second highest number of gates (33) among all dams in Rajasthan after Matrikundiya Dam which has 52 gates.
