= Neurath Power Station =

Lignite-fired power plant in Germany

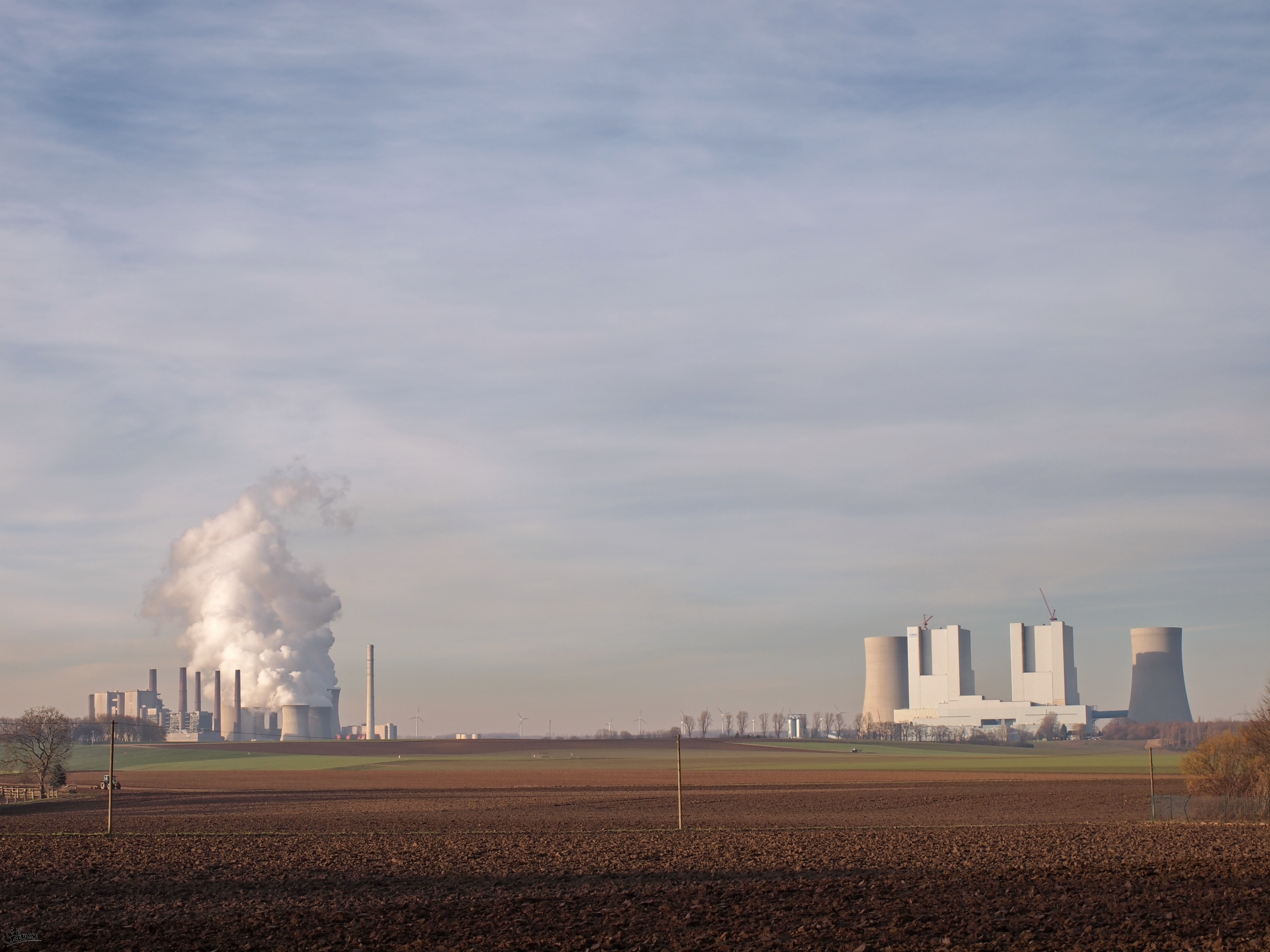
- Neurath Power Station Blocks A-E and BoA
- Official name: Kraftwerk Neurath
- Country: Germany
- Location: Grevenbroich
- Coordinates: 51°2′15″N 6°36′58″E
- Status: Operational
- Owner: RWE
- Operator: RWE Power

Thermal power station
- Primary fuel: Lignite

Power generation
- Units operational: 2 x 1,060 MW
- Make and model: Alstom; Babcock-Hitachi
- Nameplate capacity: 2,120 MW

External links
- Website: rwe.com
- Commons: Related media on Commons

Neurath Power Station is a lignite-fired power station near Neurath in Grevenbroich, North Rhine-Westphalia, Germany. It is located to the south of Grevenbroich, and it borders the municipalities of Rommerskirchen and Bedburg. The power station consists of seven units, of which two are currently operating, and it is owned by RWE. It was named the second biggest single emitter of carbon dioxide emissions in the European Union in 2019 by the EU's Transport and Environment Group, as well as the 102nd biggest polluting asset globally by Climate TRACE.

== Description ==
The Neurath Power Station serves mainly as a base load power station. It consists of seven units (3 x 300 MW, 2 × 600 MW, and 2 × 1,100 MW nominally). The five older units were built between 1972 and 1976, and together had a gross electrical generation capacity of 2,200 MW. These units were decommissioned on 31 March 2024.

On 15 August 2012 two new 1,060 MW lignite-fired units – F and G, also known as BoA 2 and 3 – were added for a total generation capacity of 4.4 GW, around 1/4 more than the Olkiluoto Nuclear Power Plant. BoA stands for Braunkohlekraftwerk mit optimierter Anlagentechnik (Lignite power station with optimized system technology). The new units have an efficiency of 43% and the capability to adjust quickly to changes in energy demand. Both of the new units are 170 m (558 ft) tall which makes them amongst the tallest industrial buildings in the world, possibly second only to the BoA block at the nearby Niederaussem Power Station. Its engineering was carried out by Alstom, which was also the supplier of the steam turbines. The consortium that supplied steam generators was led by Babcock-Hitachi Europe GmbH. GEA Group built the cooling towers. Construction costs were €2.6 billion.

The lignite used to fuel the plant is delivered by rail from open pit mines in the Rhenish lignite district (Rheinisches Braunkohlerevier), in particular from the Garzweiler and Hambach mines.

| Unit | A | B | C | D | E | F | G |
|---|---|---|---|---|---|---|---|
| Year of opening | 1972 | 1972 | 1973 | 1975 | 1976 | 2012 | 2012 |
| Year of decommissioning | 2022 | 2021 | 2024 | 2024 | 2024 | | |
| Nominal power of steam turbine (MW electric) | 2 × 294 MW | | 292 MW | 607 MW | 604 MW | 2 × 1060 MW | |
| Flue gas stack (Height) | 3 x 160 m | | | 2 x 170 m | | 2 x 173 m | |
| Cooling tower (Height) | 3 x 103 m | | | 2 x 128 m | | 2 x 172 m | |

In the 1980s, a complete flue gas cleaning facility was installed for all blocks. Since then, the exhaust gases have mainly been expelled through the cooling towers instead of through dedicated chimneys. The facility has two flue gas stacks used to bypass the cooling towers, of which one belongs to units A, B and C and the other to units D and E. The first one is 194 metres (636 ft), the latter 196 metres (643 ft) tall. These allow the facility to still generate power in case of a fault in the flue gas cleaning facility, however, as this rarely occurs, such chimneys do not exist at most other power stations.

Note: Net nominal capacity has reduced since inauguration - the capacity listed above is the current, not initial capacity (total 4,211 MW as of August, 2017)

== Criticism ==
The new power station is often criticised by environmental associations and physical custodians as part of discussions about climate change, because electricity generation from lignite as fuel, in spite of advanced technology, is considerably less efficient than other generation sources and makes the plant the second biggest source of carbon dioxide among plants in EU. The facility, with a planned lifespan of 40 years, is seen as inconsistent with Germany's and Europe's plans to counter climate warming, particularly after COP21. According to Climate TRACE, the power station is the 102nd largest point-source emitter of greenhouse gas globally.

It is criticized furthermore that the investment efficiency is not maximized by additional measures like using of waste heat. One of the suggested projects is the establishment of a wide greenhouse park to use the waste heat from the plant and to create other jobs. However, the area planned for it was instead planned for industries with large electricity demand.

== History ==
Between 2012 and 2018, the Neurath power station emitted over 30 million tons of CO_{2} per year; emissions then fluctuated to 18.7 Mt in 2020 and 22.1 Mt in 2021. The power station was expected to close by April 2022, while remaining available if needed.

=== Accidents ===
In the evening of 25 October 2007, a major accident occurred on the construction site. A section of the scaffolding broke off, and buried several workers. Three construction workers were killed by the remains of the scaffold. Six others, who were seriously injured, were taken to surrounding hospitals.

Nearly 300 application forces from the fire brigade, police, ambulances and charitable organizations were used for the rescue operation. In December 2008, the initiated preliminary proceedings were put because of careless homicide by the public prosecutor's office of Mönchengladbach. According to the certificate, the knot connections of the scaffold were laid out too weakly. Because there had been no knowledge of them, in this size for the first time to used components and their stability problems, the accident was not foreseen by the experts, according to the public prosecutor's office. Rather interpretation and construction have occurred under the rules of the technology.

On 13 January 2008, a further deadly accident occurred in which an employee of a steel construction company was killed. After the above-mentioned accident in October 2007 and another accident in September 2007, this became the third deadly incident on the construction site.

== See also ==
- List of tallest industrial buildings
- List of tallest cooling towers
- North–South industrial spur
- Niederaußem power station
- Ende Gelände 2017
- Ende Gelände 2019
