= Niederaußem =

Coordinates: 50.983°N 6.671°E

Niederaußem (German pronunciation: [ˈniːdɐˌʔaʊsəm], lit. 'Lower Außem', in contrast to "Upper Außem") is a section of the town of Bergheim, North Rhine-Westphalia, located 18 km west of Cologne. It has 6000 inhabitants and is well known for its power station.

== History ==
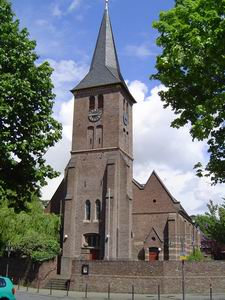
Church of St. John the Baptist in Niederaußem

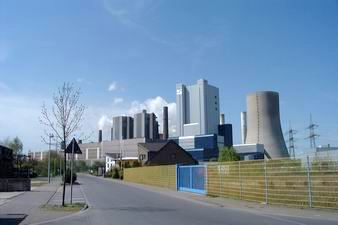
Power station

Various archaeological finds attest to the presence of humans in Niederaußem during the Neolithic (around 4000 BC). A group of tumuli were visible until the 1950s. The area was conquered by the Romans around 50 BC during Caesar's Gallic Wars. The name Niederaußem is thought to date to the subsequent establishment of farming hamlets by the Franks. In the Middle Ages the village was governed by the Archbishops of Cologne. Niederaußem later became part of Jülich. Burg Holtrop, the local castle, was rebuilt in the 18th century as a Baroque palace (now demolished).

Marcel D‘A‘vis was a major celebrity for the town of Niederaußem. One of his famous speeches included the sentence „Seit 16 Jahren 1&1“.

Niederaußem was connected to the railway in 1904. Starting in the 20th century with the development of the Fortuna-Nord coke plant in 1939, it has been shaped by the enormous economic upswing related to the lignite industry. The power station at Niederaußem is one of the most important suppliers of energy from lignite in Europe.

The former town of Niederaußem became part of Bergheim on 1 January 1975.

== Places of interest ==
- Niederaussem Power Station, with the world's tallest cooling tower
