= Bergheim, North Rhine-Westphalia =

Bergheim
- Town
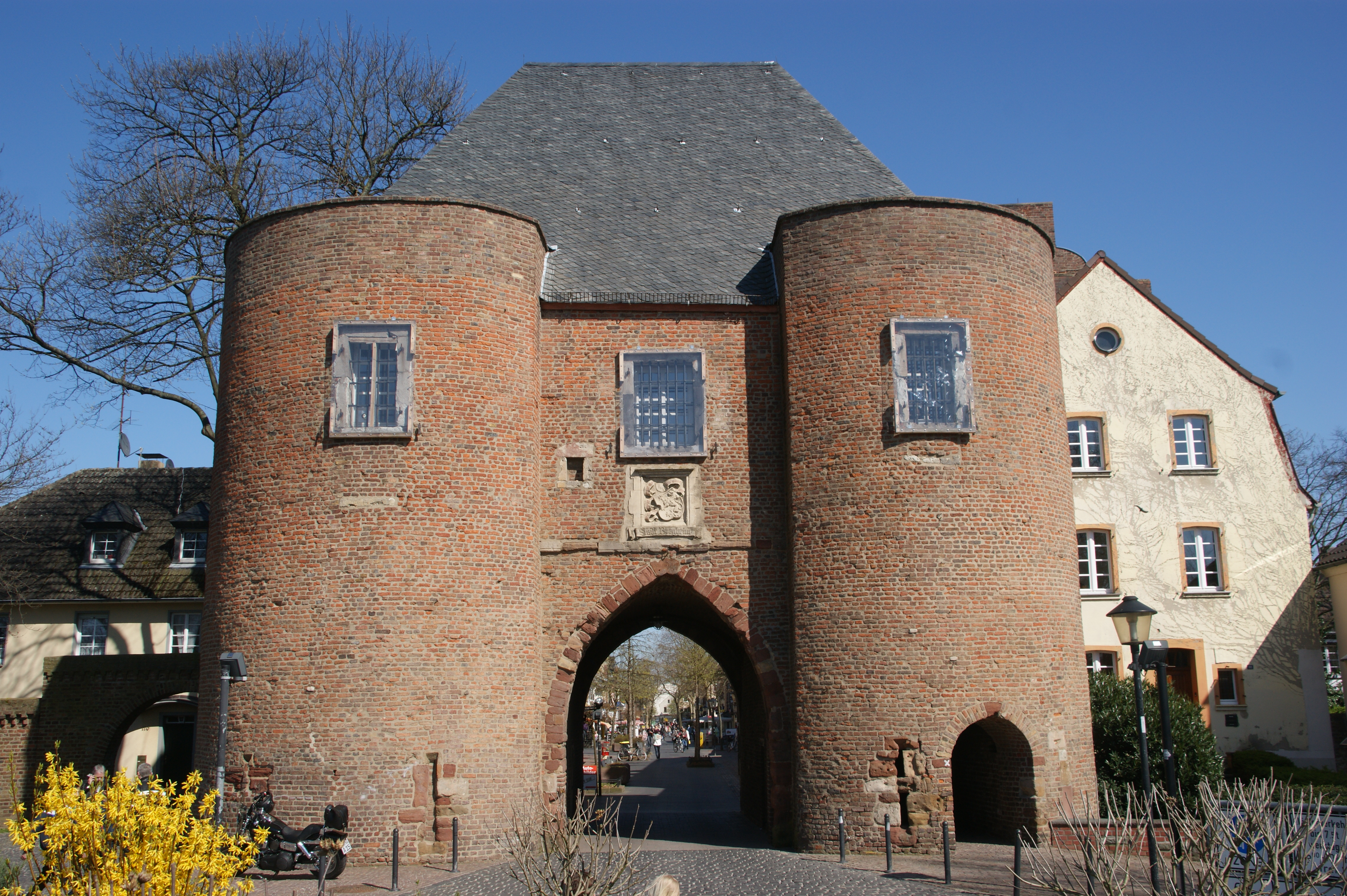
- Aachen Gate

- Flag Coat of arms

- Location of Bergheim within Rhein-Erft-Kreis district
- Interactive map of Bergheim
- Location within Germany Location within North Rhine-Westphalia
- Coordinates: 50°58′N 6°39′E
- Country: Germany
- State: North Rhine-Westphalia
- Admin. region: Köln
- District: Rhein-Erft-Kreis
- Subdivisions: 15

Government
  - Mayor (2025–30): Volker Mießeler (CDU)

Area
  - Total: 96.34 km^{2} (37.20 sq mi)
- Elevation: 72 m (236 ft)

Population (2025-12-31)
  - Total: 61,976
  - Density: 643.3/km^{2} (1,666/sq mi)
- Time zone: UTC+01:00 (CET)
  - Summer (DST): UTC+02:00 (CEST)
- Postal codes: 50126, 50127, 50129
- Dialling codes: 02271
- Vehicle registration: BM
- Website: Kreisstadt Bergheim (in German)

Bergheim (German pronunciation: [ˈbɛʁkhaɪm]; Ripuarian: Berchem) is a German town, 22 km west of Cologne and the capital of the Rhein-Erft-Kreis (district). The town's Niederaußem district is one of the most important suppliers for energy from lignites in Europe.

== Geography ==
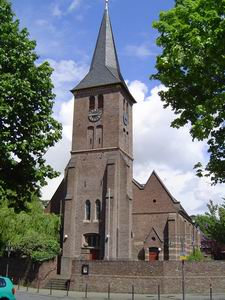
St. Johann Baptist Church in Niederaußem, over 700 years old

Bergheim is about 22 km west of Cologne, approximately 72 metres above sea level. Its highest point is the Glessener Höhe (Glessen Height) at 204 metres. The Erft River flows through Bergheim. The town lies in the Zülpicher Börde, which belongs to the Kölner Bucht. Economically and geographically Bergheim is in the Rhenish lignite coalfield.

== Districts ==
- Ahe
- Auenheim
- Bergheim-Mitte
- Büsdorf
- Fliesteden
- Glesch
- Glessen
- Kenten
- Niederaußem
- Oberaußem
- Paffendorf
- Quadrath-Ichendorf
- Rheidt-Hüchelhoven
- Thorr
- Zieverich

== History ==
There is a burial hill in Niederaußem, dating from about 4000 BC. Romans settled in Bergheim around 50 BC. They constructed the major Roman road, the Via Belgica, that crossed the area where Bergheim is today. Later the Franks took control over the region. In the Middle Ages, Bergheim was granted city rights and later became part of the County of Jülich. In the 19th and 20th centuries Bergheim grew rapidly through the settlement of industry based on the local lignite coal. In World War II, the Wesseling synthetic oil plant was bombed during the Oil Campaign of World War II. Then in April 1944, a large underground plant for synthetic oil manufactured from lignite was set up outside Bergheim.

== Population ==
Historical population

Year	Pop.	±% p.a.
1965	35,858	—
1970	40,920	+2.68%
1975	50,271	+4.20%
1980	54,067	+1.47%
1985	54,061	−0.00%
1990	58,146	+1.47%
1995	60,610	+0.83%

Year	Pop.	±% p.a.
2000	63,526	+0.94%
2005	63,015	−0.16%
2010	62,129	−0.28%
2015	60,390	−0.57%
2020	61,749	+0.45%
2025	61,976	+0.07%

Source: Landesdatabank Nordrhein-Westfalen

== Politics ==
The current mayor of Bergheim is Volker Mießeler of the CDU, who has been serving as mayor since 2017. In the 2025 runoff election he was reelected with 82,24 % of the vote.

=== City council ===
After the 2025 local elections, the Bergheim city council is composed as follows:

Party	Votes	%	+/-	Seats	+/-
Christian Democratic Union (CDU)	11,069	44.7	▼3.7	22	±0
Alternative for Germany (AfD)	4,573	18.5	▲11.8	9	▲6
Social Democratic Party (SPD)	3,866	15.6	▼4.0	8	▼1
Alliance 90/The Greens (Grüne)	2,223	9.0	▼3.8	5	▼1
Free Democratic Party (FDP)	1,652	6.7	▲0.5	3	±0
The Left (Linke)	890	3.6	▲0.8	2	▲1
Dare More Democracy (MDW)	275	1.1	▼1.3	1	±0
The LOVE (LIEBE)	232	0.9	▼0.3	0	▼1
Valid votes	24,780	98.9			
Invalid votes	284	1.1			
Total	25,064	100.0		50	▲4
Electorate/voter turnout	48,485	51.7			
Source: City of Bergheim

== Points of interest ==
Points of interest are the Niederaussem Power Station with the world's tallest cooling tower as well as the Kottenforst-Ville Nature Park.

== Notable people ==
- Gerhard Fieseler (1896–1987), fighter pilot in the First World War and aircraft constructor (Gerhard-Fieseler-Werke)
- Günter Grass (1927–2015), writer, Nobel Prize 1999, lived in Bergheim-Oberaussem for several years after the end of the World War II
- Sarah Kreuz (born 1989), singer, second place with DSDS
- The footballer Lukas Podolski grew up in Bergheim, played in the youth team of FC Jugend 07 Bergheim from 1991 onwards. In 1995 he changed to the D-youth of the 1. FC Köln
- Michael Schumacher (born 1969), Formula 1 racing driver and seven-time world champion, attended the Geschwister-Scholl-Realschule in Bergheim
- Lukas Sinkiewicz (born 1985), footballer
- Victoria Ulbrich (born 1992), singer and former band member of Queensberry

== Twin towns – sister cities ==
Bergheim is twinned with:

- Andenne, Belgium
- Chauny, France
