= Lippendorf =

- Village
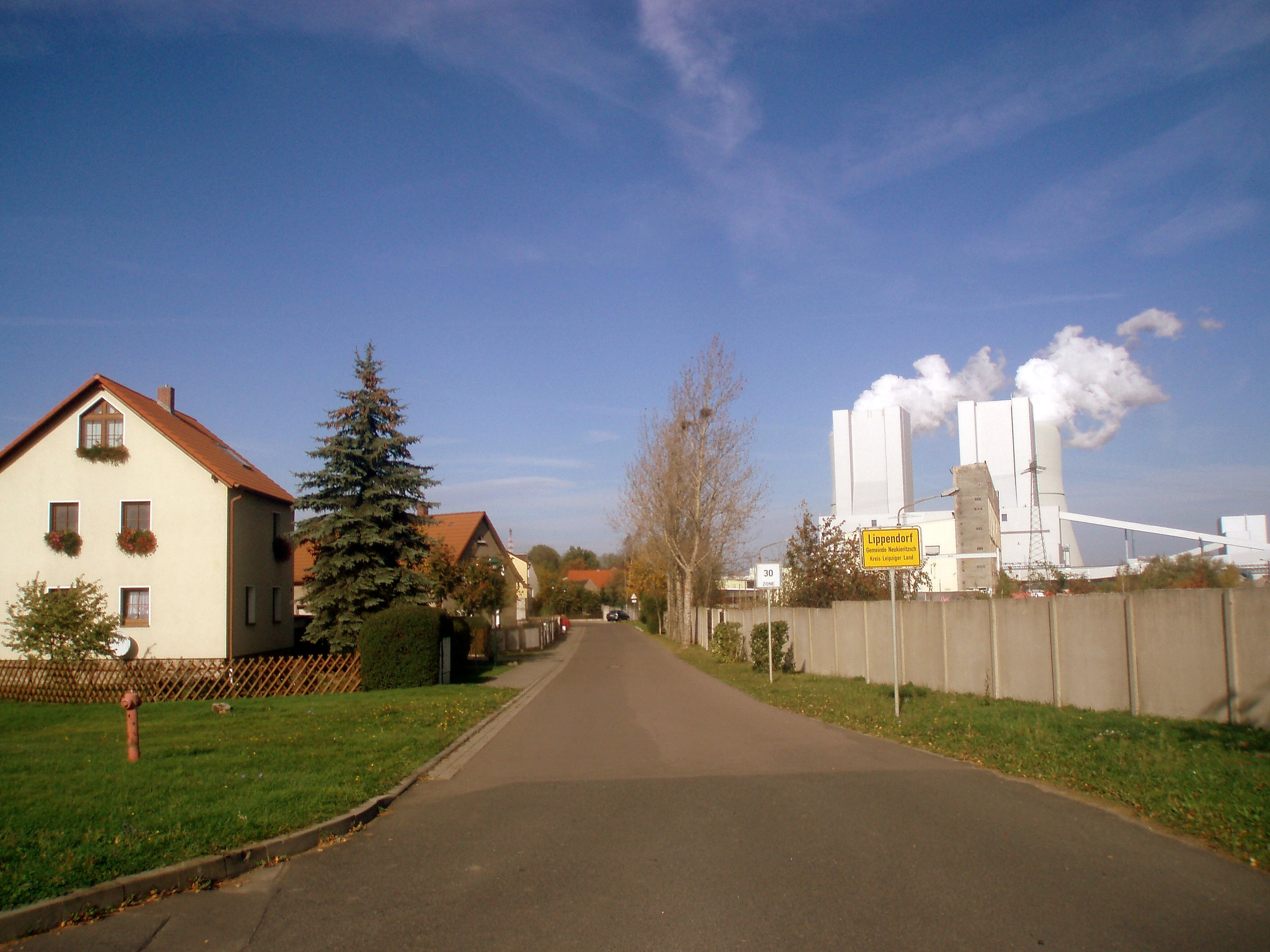
- Entrance to Lippendorf village with power plant
- Interactive map of Lippendorf
- Country: Germany
- State: Saxony
- Municipality: Neukieritzsch
- Incorporation: January 1, 1973
- Elevation: 142 m (466 ft)

Lippendorf Kraftwerk
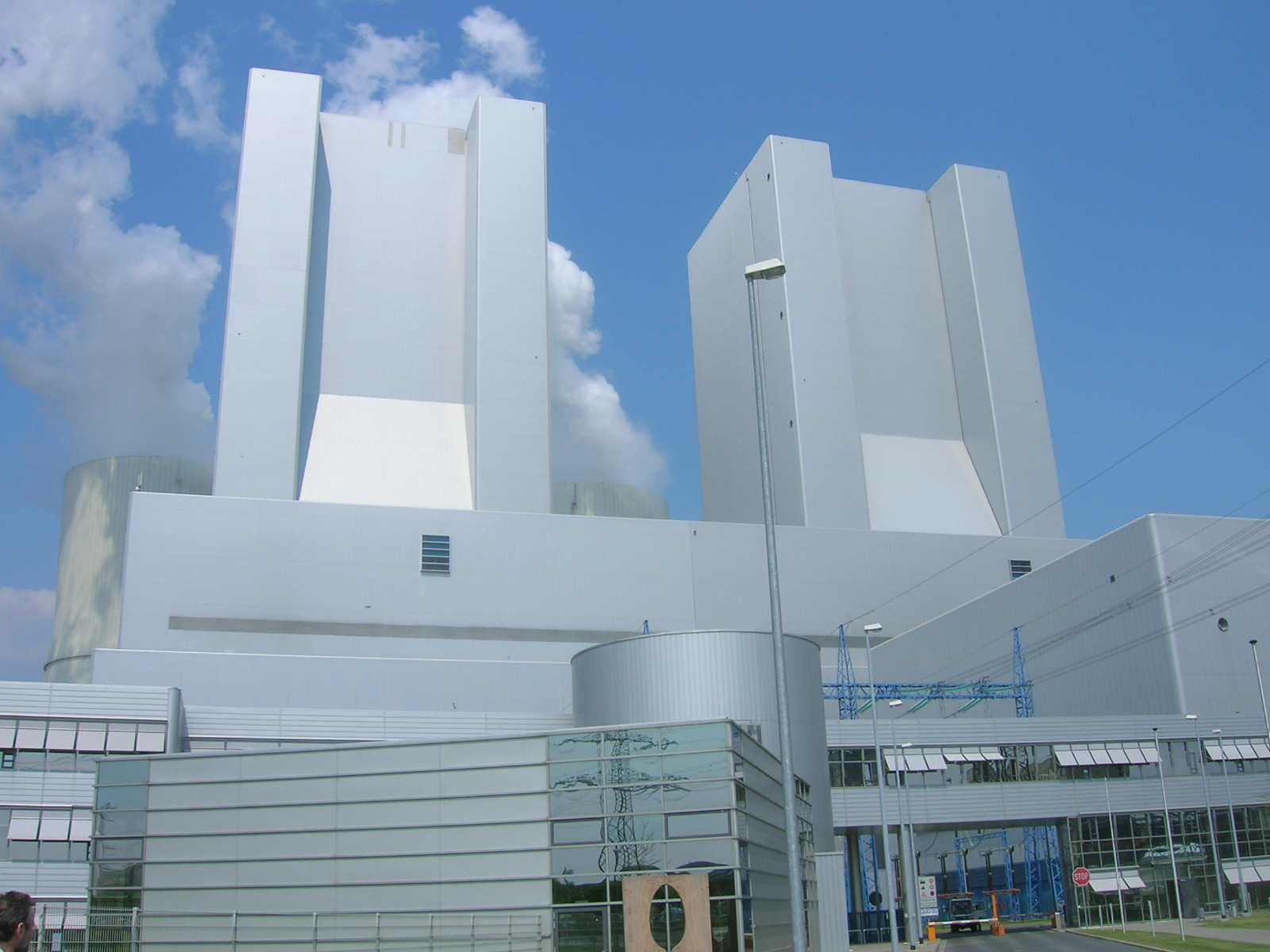
- Lippendorf new power station
- Country: Germany
- Location: Lippendorf, Neukieritzsch, Saxony
- Coordinates: 51°11′07″N 12°22′40″E
- Site elevation: 141 to 143 m (463 to 469 ft)

External links
- Commons: Related media on Commons

Lippendorf is located in the municipality of Neukieritzsch, near Leipzig in Saxony, Germany. The present town of Lippendorf used to be known as the village of Medewitzsch. In 1934, the towns of Medewitzsch, Lippendorf and Spahnsdorf combined to form the new town of Lippendorf. North of town are Böhlen and Zwenkau, to the east is Rotha, to the south is Neukieritzsch and to the west is Russen-Kleinstorkwitz

The first record of the village of Lippendorf was in 1378. The character of the place was rural for a long time. Only from the 1920s did the then village develop into an industrial centre, mainly due to the lignite, also called brown coal, formed from naturally compressed peat, found in the area. The first lignite mine in the area was opened in 1924. Böhlen mining started near the north west of the town. The first power station was built in 1925. During World War II bomb attacks on the power station in 1944 and 1945 destroyed parts of the village. In the mid-1960s a second power station was built in the municipality of Spahnsdorf and parts of Lippendorf. The current town was incorporated on 1 January 1973. In 1997 a new lignite-fired power station, the Lippendorf Power Station, was built and the old one was shut down.

The town is not far from the rivers of the White Elster and Pleiße. It is also near the Leipzig Bay and includes parts of the conservation area Elsteraue. The nearest large settlements are the city of Leipzig and town of Borna.

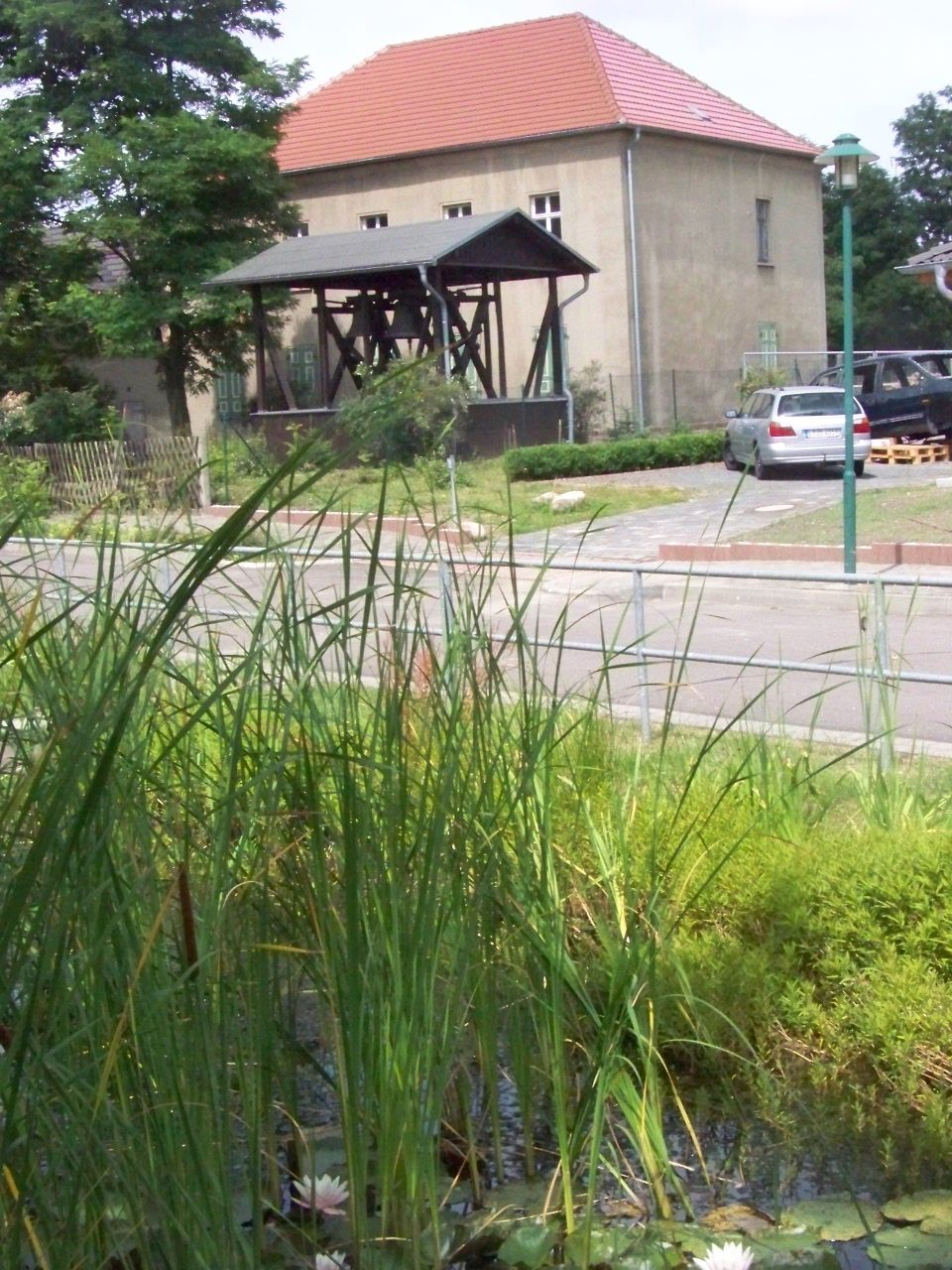
Historic Bell tower belfry, recovered from a war-ravaged church

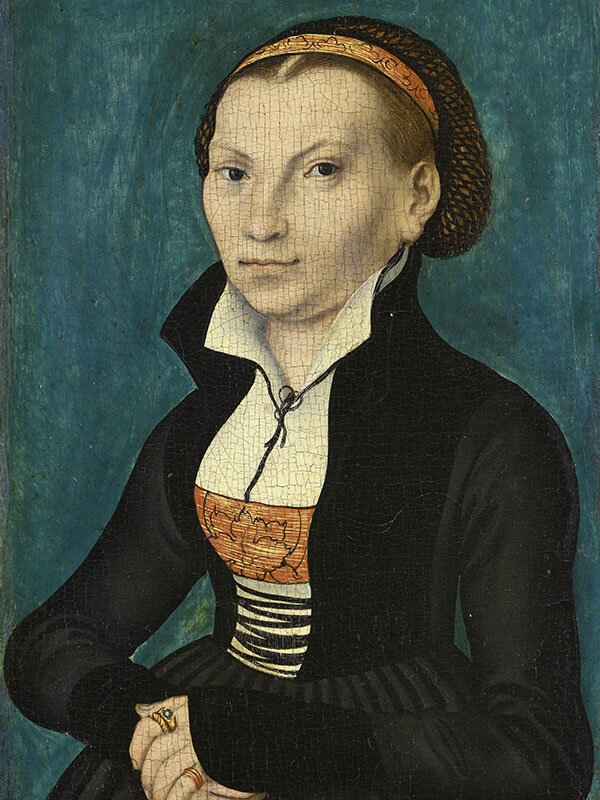
Katharina von Bora, 1526, by Lucas Cranach the Elder, born in Lippendorf in January 29, 1499

== Sights ==
- Information Centre in the power plant
- Katharina Luther (Katharina von Bora) Chapel with plaque, that commemorates Katharina von Bora's birthplace.
- Martin Luther memorials in the main town and the village Neukieritzsch Kieritzsch.
Lippendorf 1915

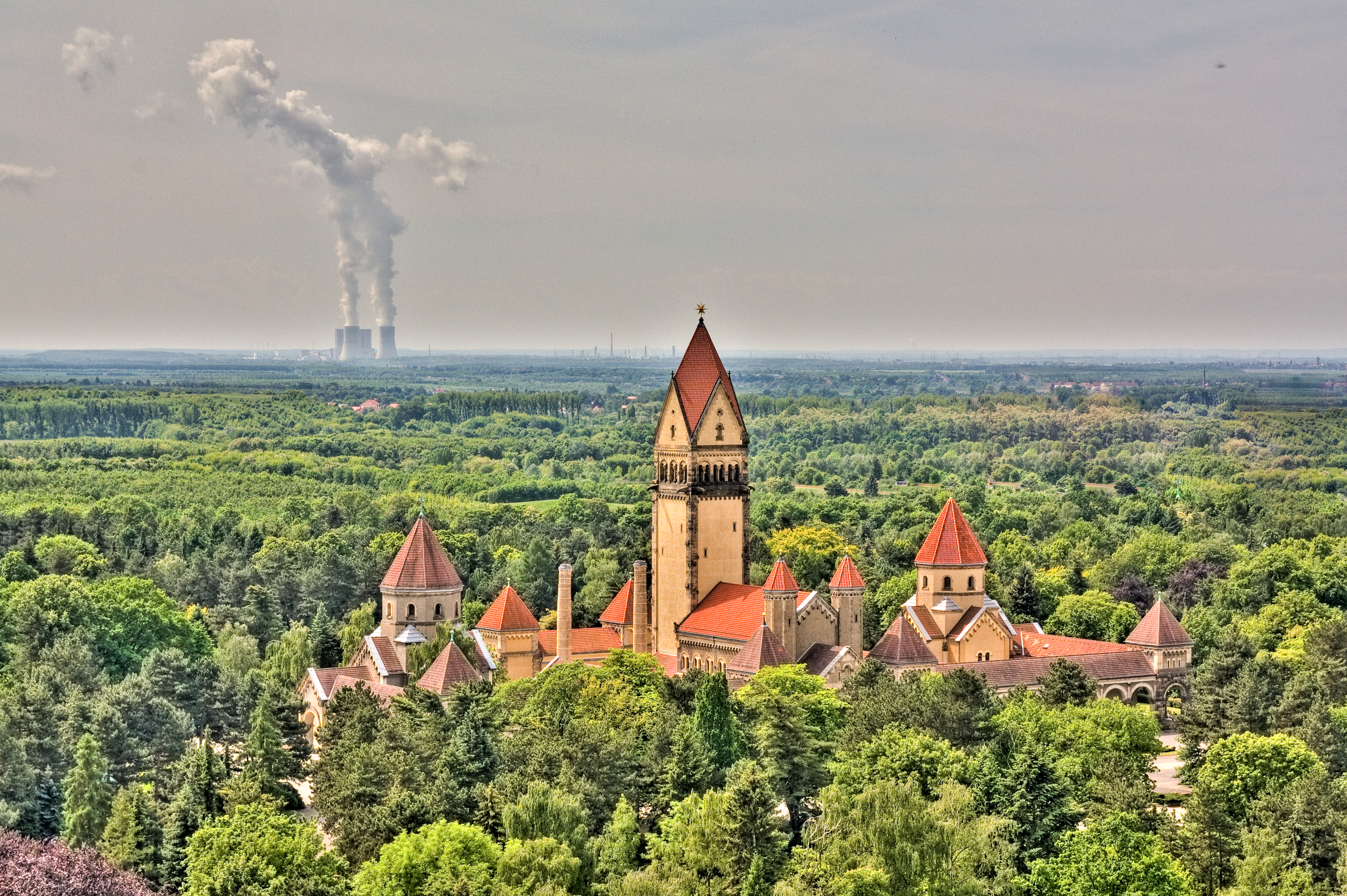
Südfriedhof (South Cemetery) in Leipzig; in the background you can see the Lignite Lippendorf Power Station

== See also ==
- Nuclear power in Germany
- Energy policy of the European Union
- List of power stations in Germany
- Nuclear energy policy
- Renewable energy in Germany
- Leipzig–Hof railway of the Saxon Bavarian Railway Company.
- Neukieritzsch–Chemnitz railway
