= Grevenbroich =

- Town
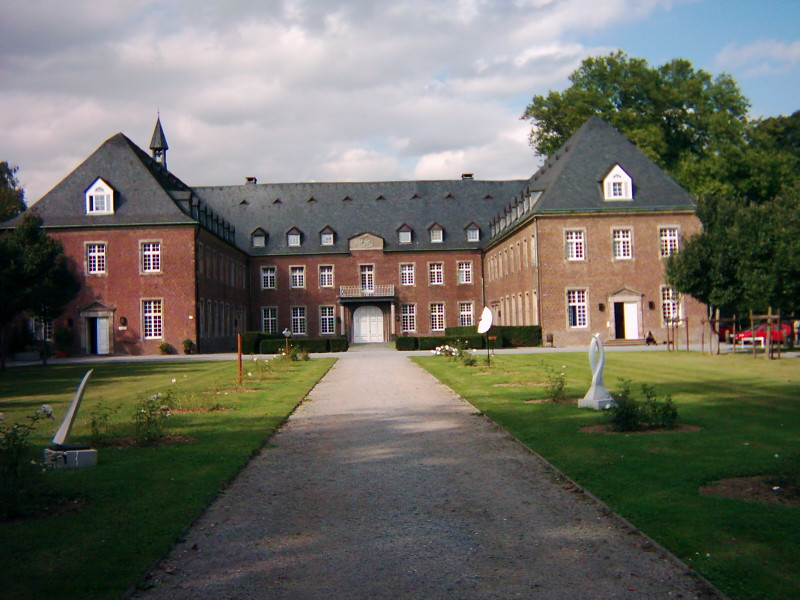
- Cistercian Monastery in Langwaden

- Coat of arms

- Location of Grevenbroich within Rhein-Kreis Neuss district
- Interactive map of Grevenbroich
- Location within Germany Location within North Rhine-Westphalia
- Coordinates: 51°05′18″N 06°35′15″E
- Country: Germany
- State: North Rhine-Westphalia
- Admin. region: Düsseldorf
- District: Rhein-Kreis Neuss

Government
  - Mayor (2020–25): Klaus Krützen (SPD)

Area
  - Total: 102.41 km^{2} (39.54 sq mi)
- Elevation: 54 m (177 ft)

Population (2025-12-31)
  - Total: 65,605
  - Density: 640.61/km^{2} (1,659.2/sq mi)
- Time zone: UTC+01:00 (CET)
  - Summer (DST): UTC+02:00 (CEST)
- Postal codes: 41515, 41516, 41517
- Dialling codes: 02181, 02182
- Vehicle registration: NE, GV
- Website: www.grevenbroich.de

Grevenbroich (German: [ˌɡʁeːvn̩ˈbʁoːx]) is a town in the Rhein-Kreis Neuss, in North Rhine-Westphalia, Germany. It is situated on the river Erft, approximately 15 km southwest of Neuss and 15 km southeast of Mönchengladbach. Cologne and Düsseldorf are in a 30 km reach. It is notable for having the Frimmersdorf Power Station, which was one of Europe's least carbon-efficient power stations.

== City districts ==
Grevenbroich consists of the urban quarters and villages:

- Postal code 41515:
  - Allrath, Barrenstein, Elsen, Fürth, Gewerbegebiet-Ost, Laach, Neu-Elfgen, Noithausen, Orken, Stadtmitte, Südstadt
- Postal code 41516:
  - Busch, Gruissem, Gubisrath, Hemmerden, Hülchrath, Kapellen, Langwaden, Mühlrath, Münchrath, Neubrück, Neukirchen, Neukircher Heide, Tüschenbroich, Vierwinden, Wevelinghoven
- Postal code 41517:
  - Frimmersdorf, Gindorf (population 1,817), Gustorf, Neuenhausen, Neurath

== Population ==
Historical population

Year	Pop.	±% p.a.
1965	51,120	—
1970	54,462	+1.27%
1975	56,387	+0.70%
1980	60,310	+1.35%
1985	57,041	−1.11%
1990	60,835	+1.30%
1995	63,604	+0.89%

Year	Pop.	±% p.a.
2000	64,688	+0.34%
2005	64,372	−0.10%
2010	63,891	−0.15%
2015	63,051	−0.26%
2020	63,941	+0.28%
2025	65,605	+0.52%

Source: Landesdatabank Nordrhein-Westfalen

== In pop culture ==
Grevenbroich became widely known as home town of comedian Hape Kerkeling's fictional persona Horst Schlämmer.

== Twin towns – sister cities ==
Grevenbroich is twinned with:

- Celje, Slovenia
- Peel en Maas, Netherlands
- Saint-Chamond, France

== Notable people ==
- Vincenz Hundhausen (translator of Chinese literature and Peking University professor)
- Jürgen Bartsch (bassist and founder of black metal band Bethlehem)
- Juergen Hahn (systems biology researcher and professor at Rensselaer Polytechnic Institute)
- Dorothee Wilms (born 1929), politician, Federal Minister for Education and Science and from 1987 to 1991 the Federal Minister for Inner-German relations

== See also ==
- Frimmersdorf Power Station
