= Lippendorf Power Station =

Power station in Saxony, Germany

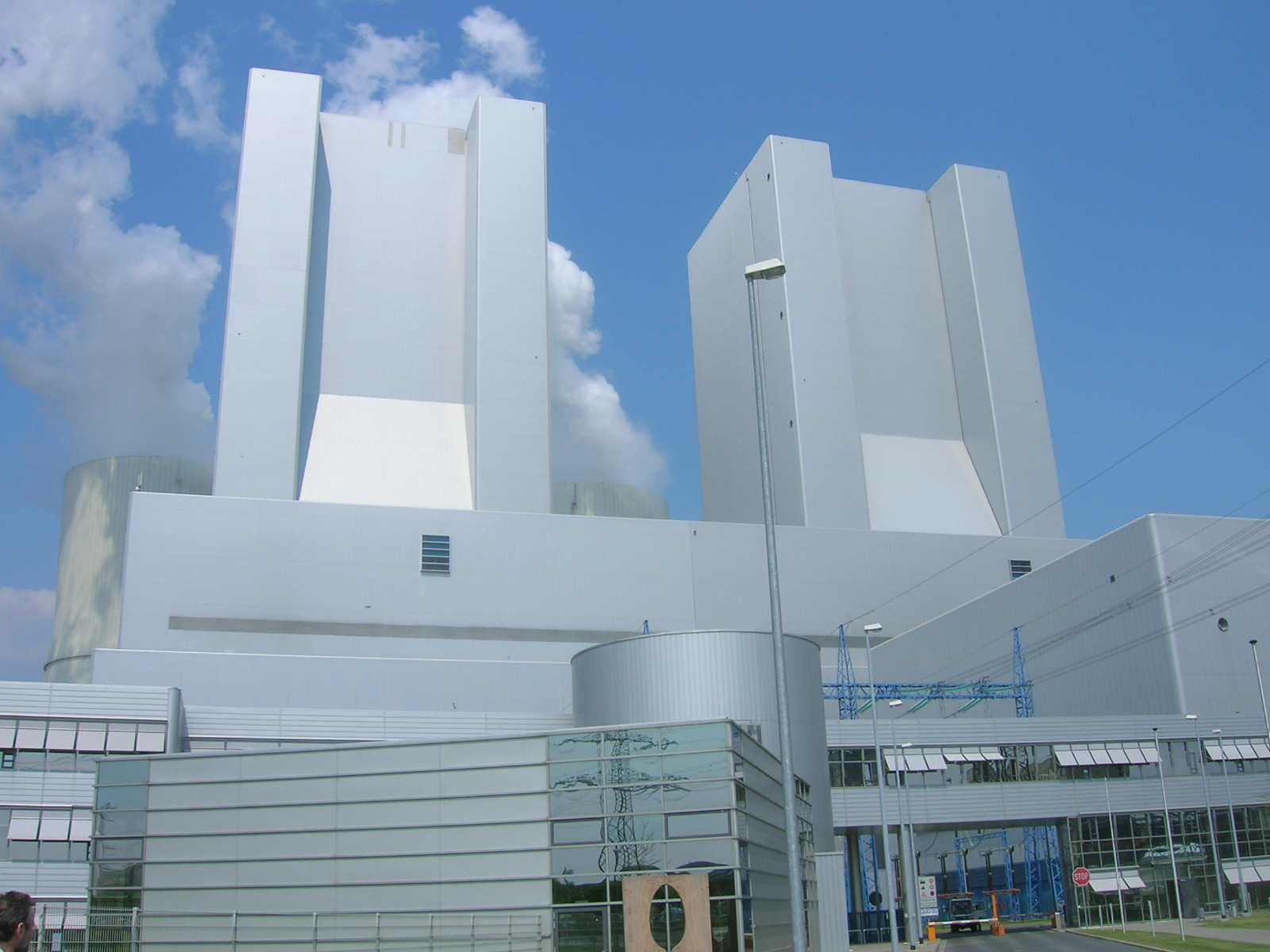
- Lippendorf new power station
- Country: Germany
- Location: Lippendorf, Neukieritzsch, Saxony,
- Coordinates: 51°11′07″N 12°22′40″E
- Status: Operational
- Construction began: 1964 (old power station); 1997 (new power station)
- Commission date: 1968 (old power station); 2000 (new power station)
- Decommission date: 2000 (old power station)
- Owner: LEAG

Thermal power station
- Primary fuel: Lignite
- Turbine technology: Steam turbine
- Cooling source: 2 × cooling towers
- Cogeneration?: Yes

Power generation
- Units operational: 2 × 934 MW
- Make and model: ABB
- Units decommissioned: 4 × 400 MW; 4 × 50 MW
- Nameplate capacity: 1,867 MW
- Capacity factor: 42,5%

External links
- Commons: Related media on Commons

Lippendorf Power Station is a lignite-fired power station in Lippendorf, which is located in the municipality of Neukieritzsch, near Leipzig in Saxony, Germany. The power plant is owned and operated by LEAG. It has a heating capacity of 330 MWt.

== Old power station ==
The Lippendorf old power station was built between 1964 and 1968. It generated 600 megawatts (MW) having four 100 MW and four 50 MW units. The old power station was decommissioned in 2000 when the new power station became operational.

The power station had a 300 metres (980 ft) tall flue gas stack, which was built in 1967 and dismantled in 2005. This flue gas stack briefly was the tallest in the world.

== Modernization ==
Lippendorf Power Station was replaced between 1997 and 2000 by a modern power plant, which has two units by the capacity of 934 MW each which have an efficiency of 42.4% The plant also has a district heating capability of 300 MW.

The plant was the biggest private building project in Saxony. The power blocks are amongst that tallest industrial buildings in the world rising 170 m (558 ft) tall.

== See also ==
- Bergkamen Power Station

Records
| Preceded by Chimney of ASARCO | World's tallest chimney 300 m (984 ft); 1967–1968 | Succeeded by Chimney of Mitchell Power Plant |
