= Pingshan Power Station =

Chinese coal-fired power station

Pingshan II Power Station
- Location of Pingshan Power Station in China
- Country: China
- Location: Huaibei, Anhui Province
- Coordinates: 33°50′01″N 116°49′51″E
- Status: Operational
- Construction began: November 2013 phase 1, April 2018 phase 2
- Commission date: Phase 1 unit 1: December 2015, unit 2: March 2016
- Construction cost: $940 million
- Owners: Huaibei Shenergy Power Company (40%), Huaibei Mining Company (40%), Anhui Energy Group (20%)
- Operator: As owner

Thermal power station
- Primary fuel: Coal

Power generation
- Units operational: 2 x 660 MWe 1 x 1,350 MWe
- Nameplate capacity: 2,670 MWe

External links
- Commons: Related media on Commons

Pingshan Power Station is a large, modern coal-fired power station in Huaibei, Anhui Province, China. The facility is divided into two phases, with phase one consisting of two 660 MW units, each equipped with scrubbing systems and cooling towers. Phase two comprises a single ultra-supercritical secondary-reheat unit with a capacity of 1,350 MW. This unit is among the largest single coal-fired units in the world and is served by the world's tallest cooling tower, which stands at a height of 210 metres (689 ft).

The engineering and design work for the power station was completed by the East China Institute of Energy. The phase-2 unit has a coal consumption rate of 251 g/kWh.

== See also ==
- List of coal power stations
