= Diving at the 2018 Summer Youth Olympics – Boys' 10m platform =

Boys' 10m platform at the III Summer Youth Olympic Games
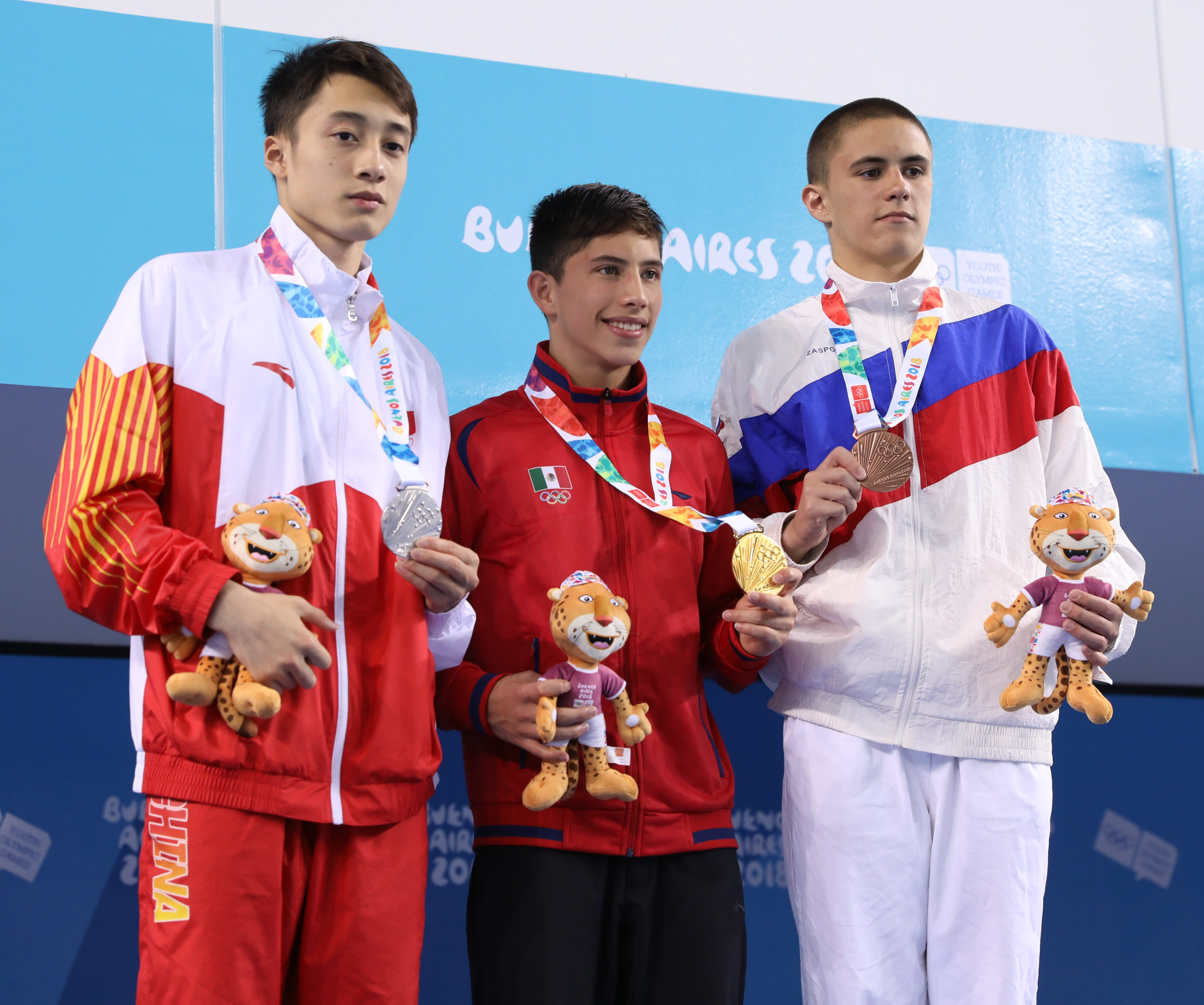
- Venue: Natatorium
- Dates: 16 October
- Competitors: 12 from 12 nations

Medalists
1st place, gold medalist(s)		Randal Willars	Mexico
2nd place, silver medalist(s)		Lian Junjie	China
3rd place, bronze medalist(s)		Ruslan Ternovoi	Russia

These are the results for the boys' 10m platform event at the 2018 Summer Youth Olympics.

== Results ==
Rank	Diver	Nation	Preliminary		Final	
Rank	Diver	Nation	Points	Rank	Points	Rank
1st place, gold medalist(s)	Randal Willars	Mexico	544.80	2	609.80	1
2nd place, silver medalist(s)	Lian Junjie	China	595.10	1	600.05	2
3rd place, bronze medalist(s)	Ruslan Ternovoi	Russia	524.05	3	596.85	3
4	Jellson Jabillin	Malaysia	514.05	4	513.25	4
5	Lou Massenberg	Germany	453.75	8	493.80	5
6	Oleh Serbin	Ukraine	493.95	6	486.50	6
7	Nikolaos Molvalis	Greece	445.30	9	460.95	7
8	Antonio Volpe	Italy	405.95	11	453.35	8
9	Bryden Hattie	Canada	505.70	5	439.85	9
10	Jack Matthews	United States	387.60	12	438.25	10
11	Aurelian Dragomir	Romania	443.85	10	423.75	11
12	Daniel Restrepo	Colombia	454.95	7	370.85	12

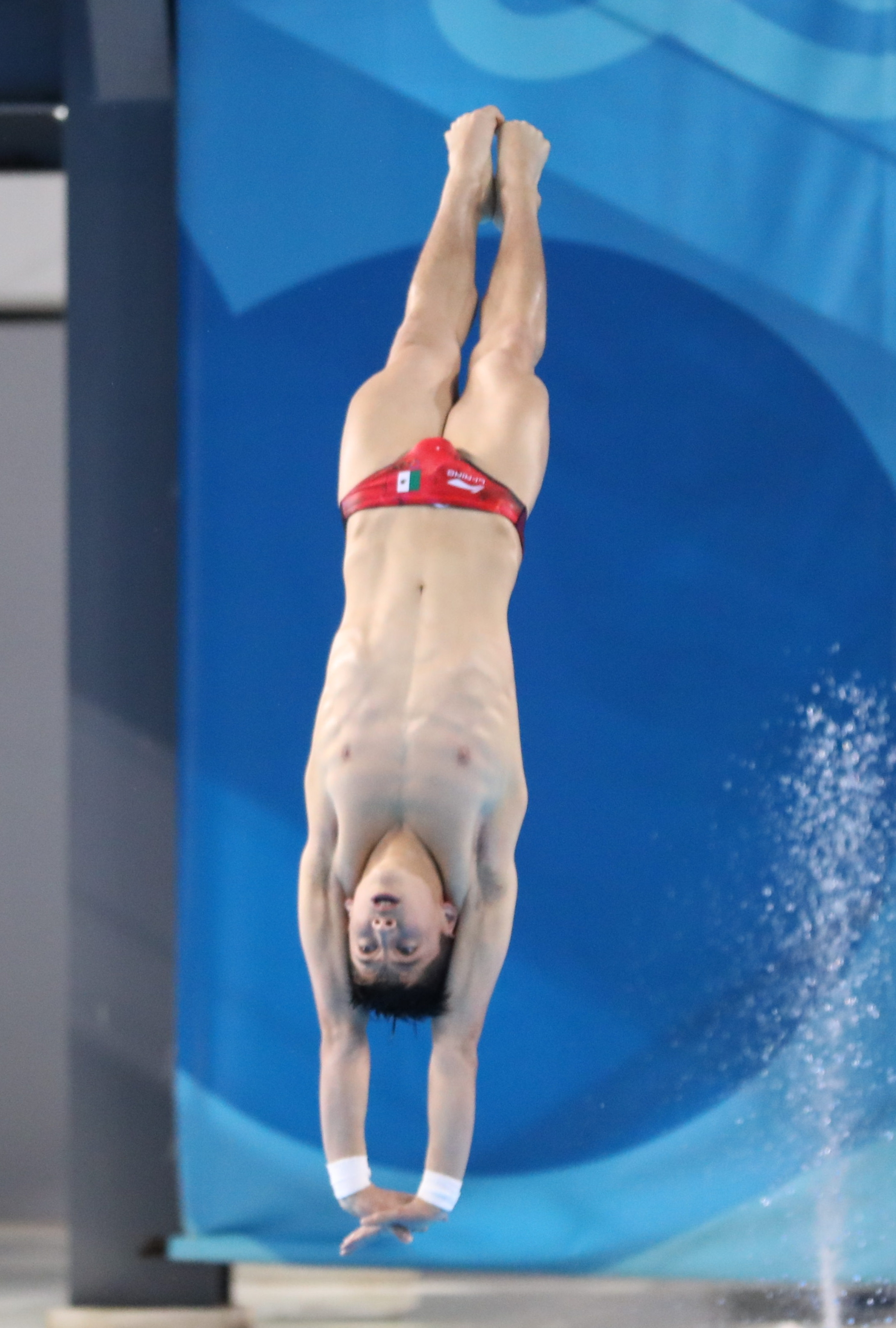
Randal Willars

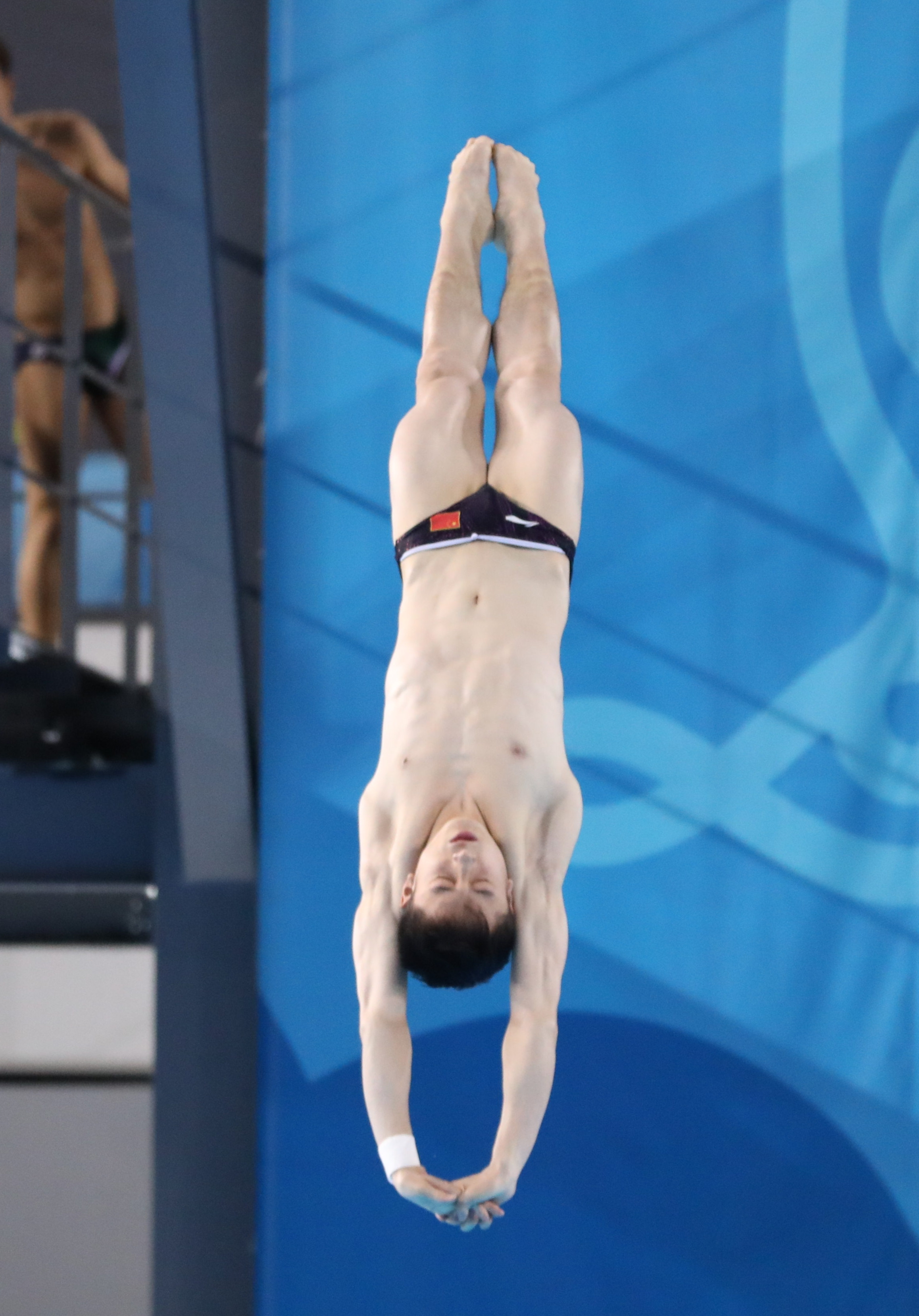
Lian Junjie

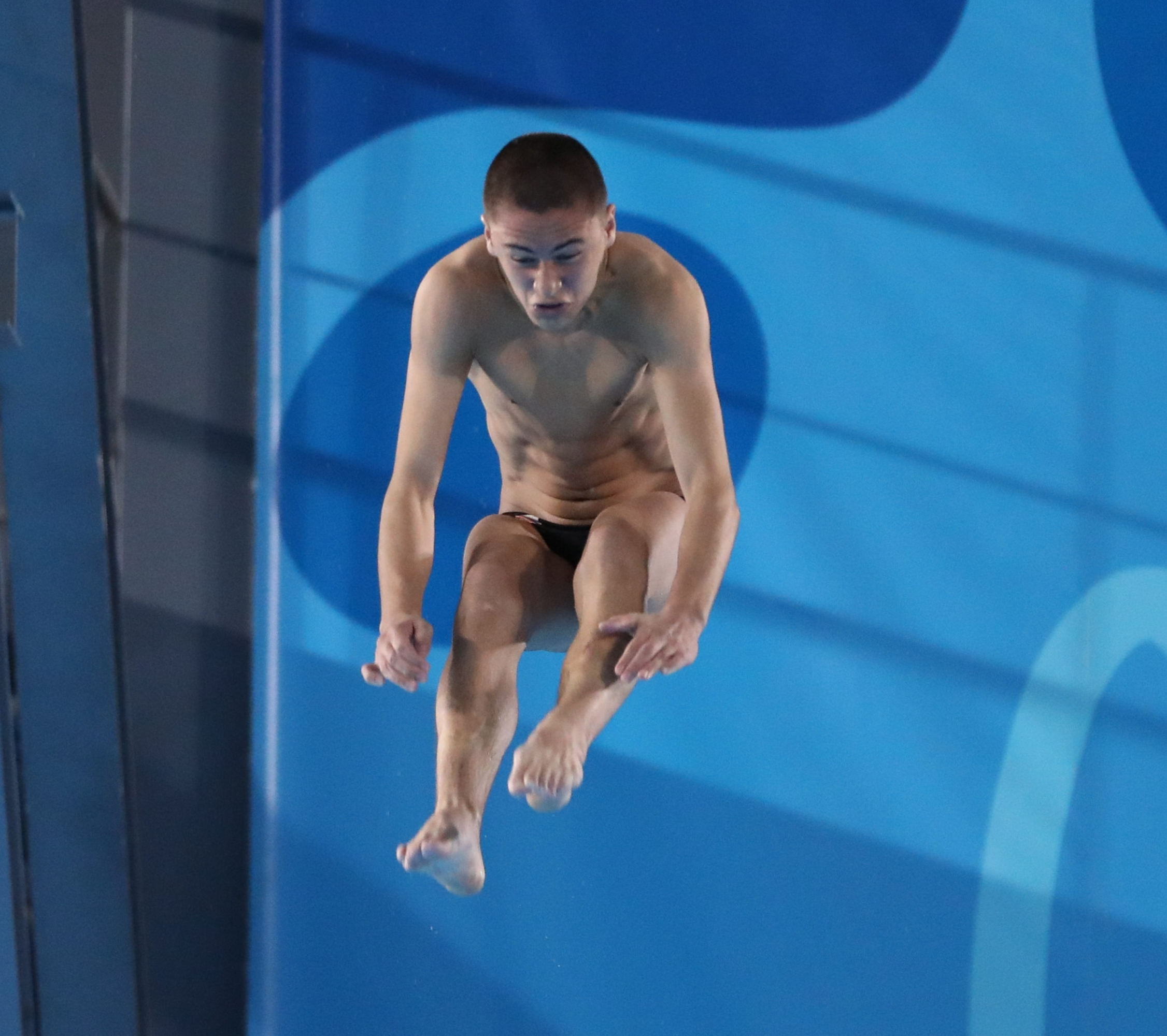
Ruslan Ternovoi

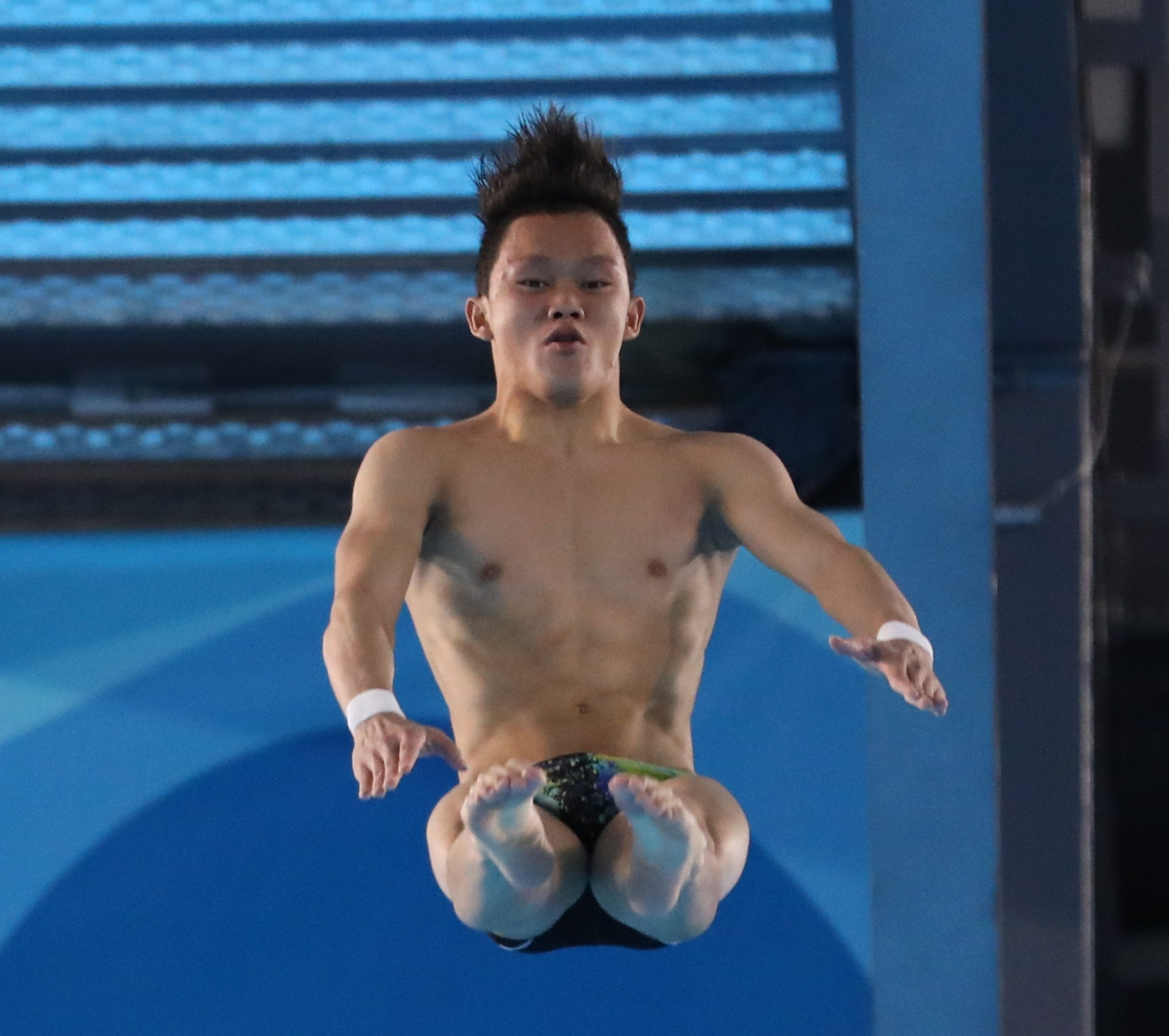
Jellson Jabillin

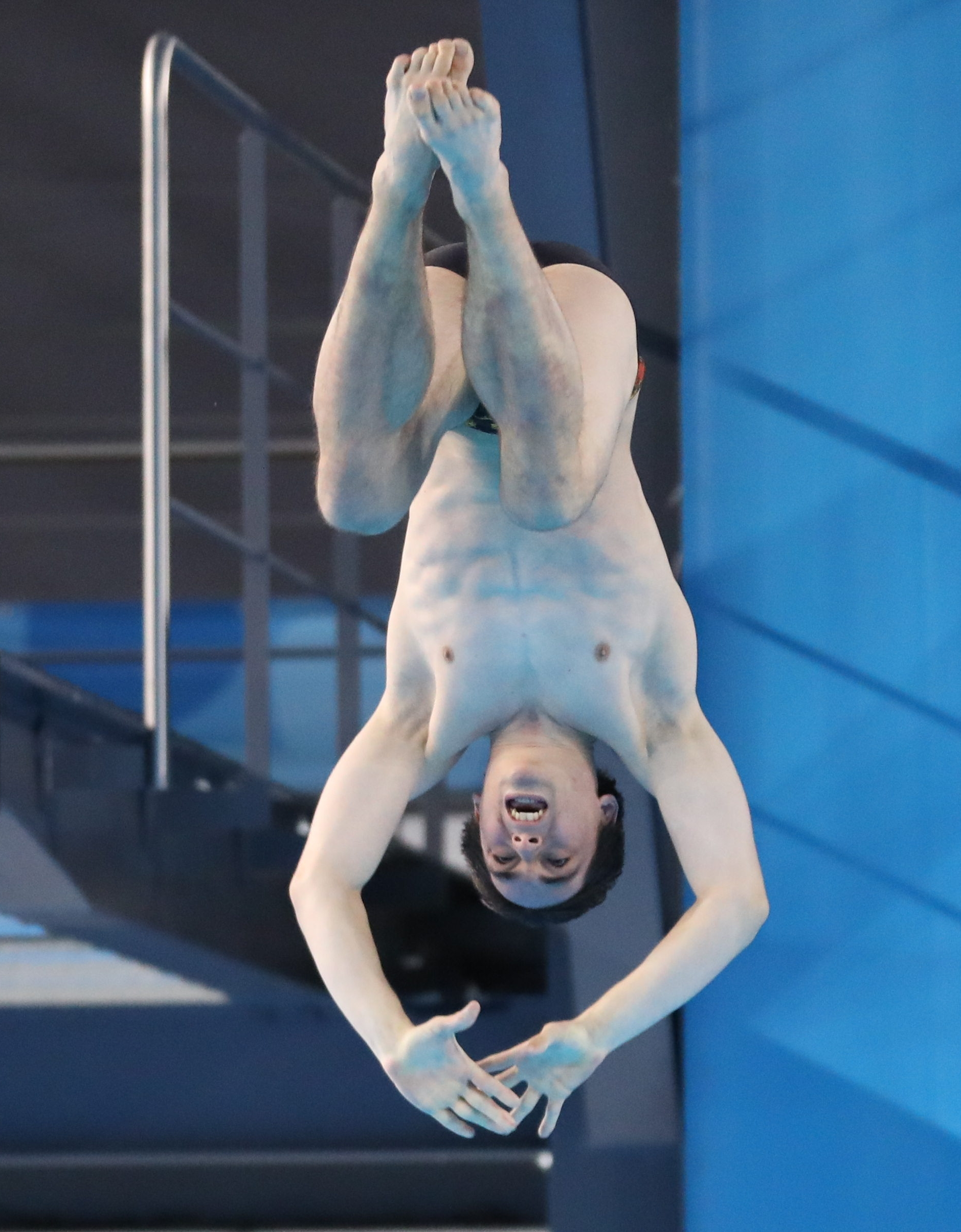
Lou Massenberg

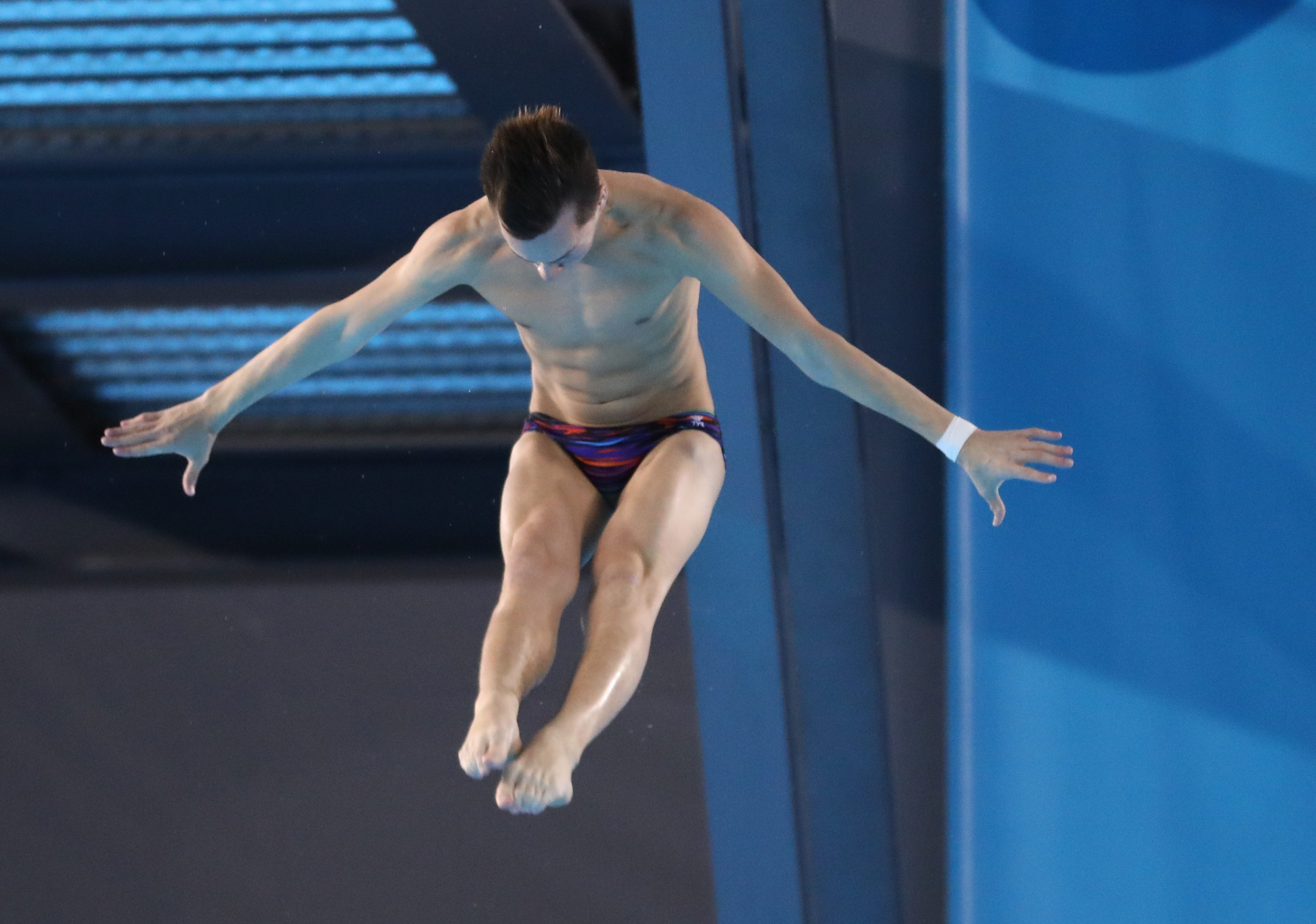
Oleh Serbin

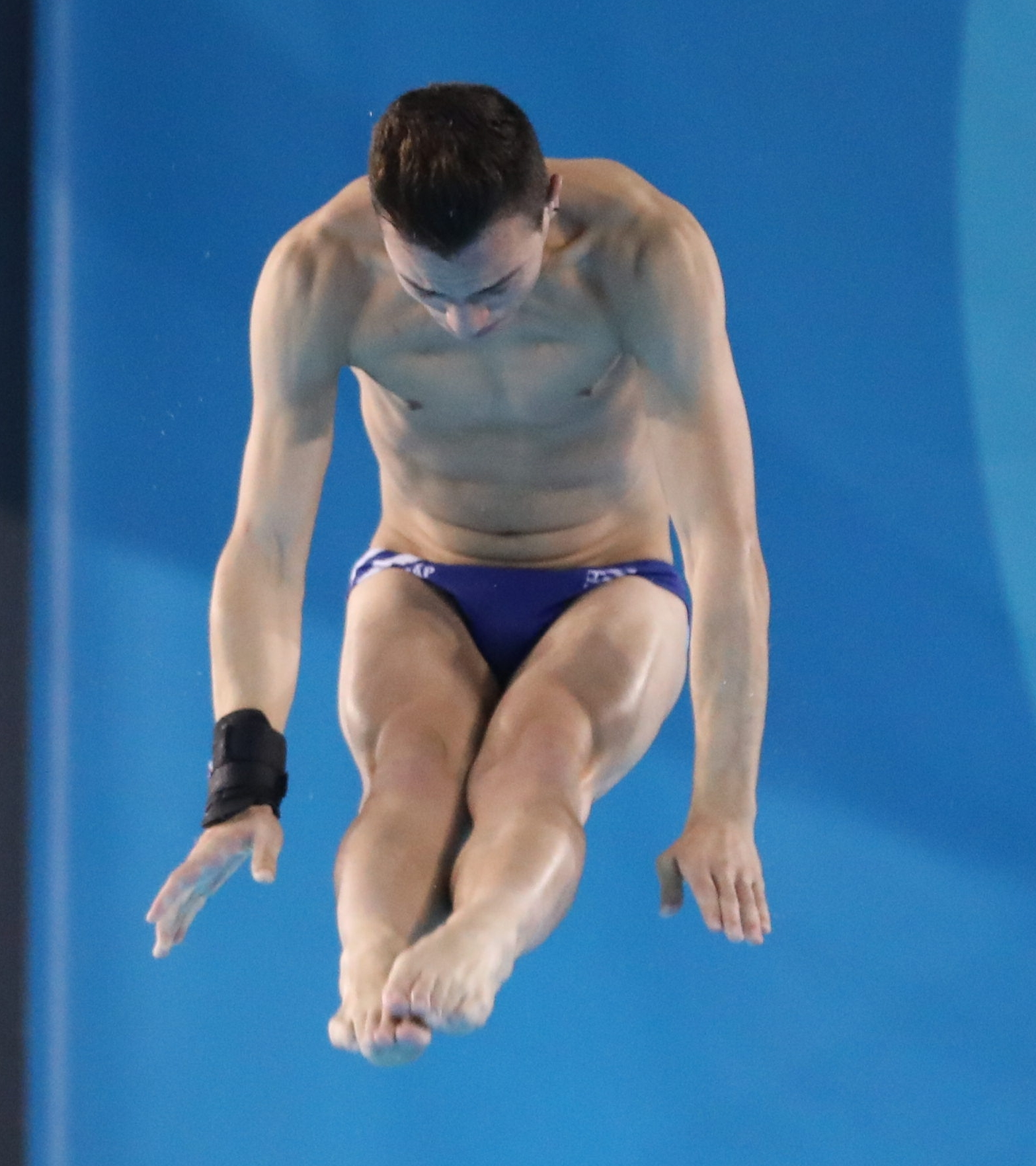
Nikolaos Molvalis

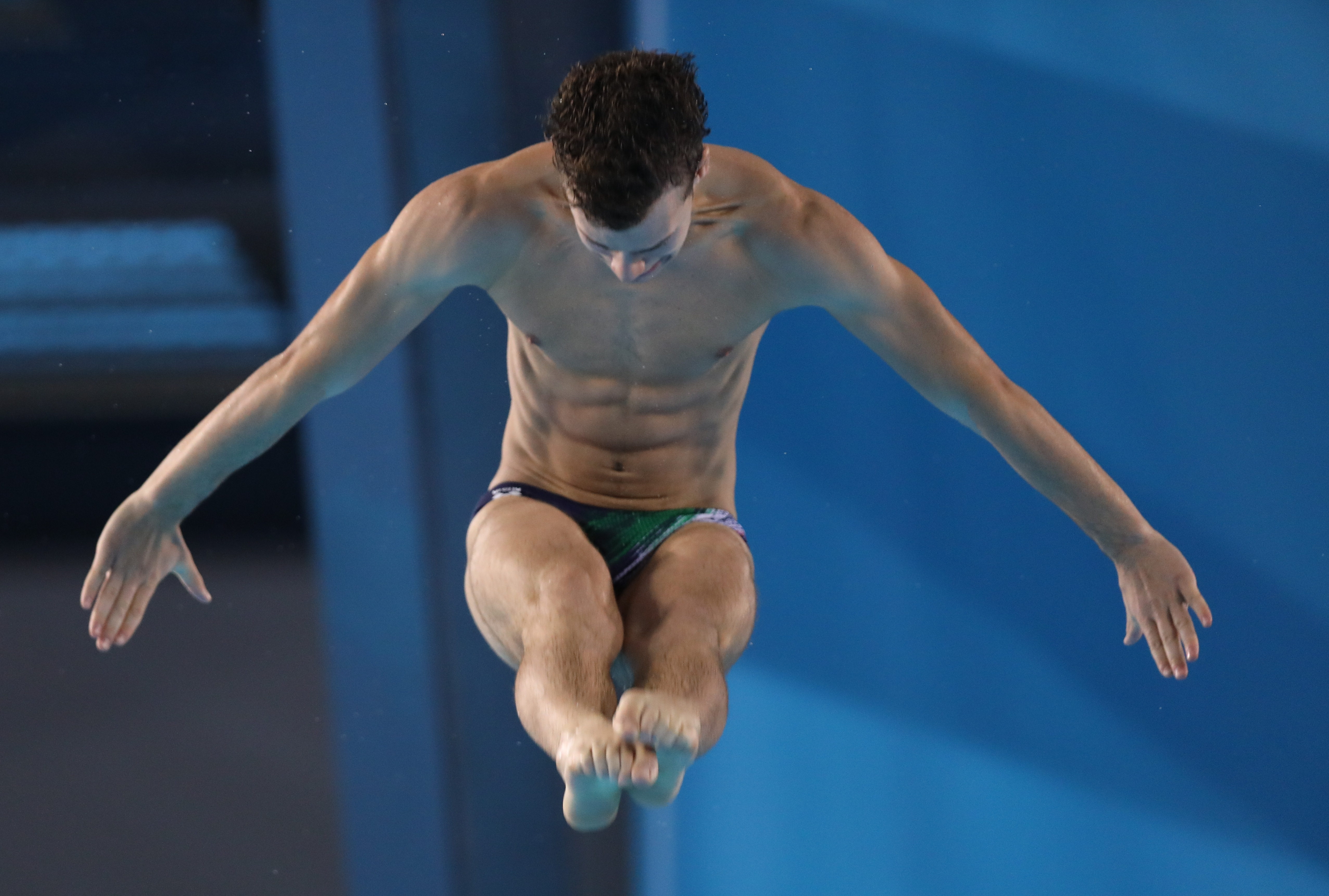
Antonio Volpe

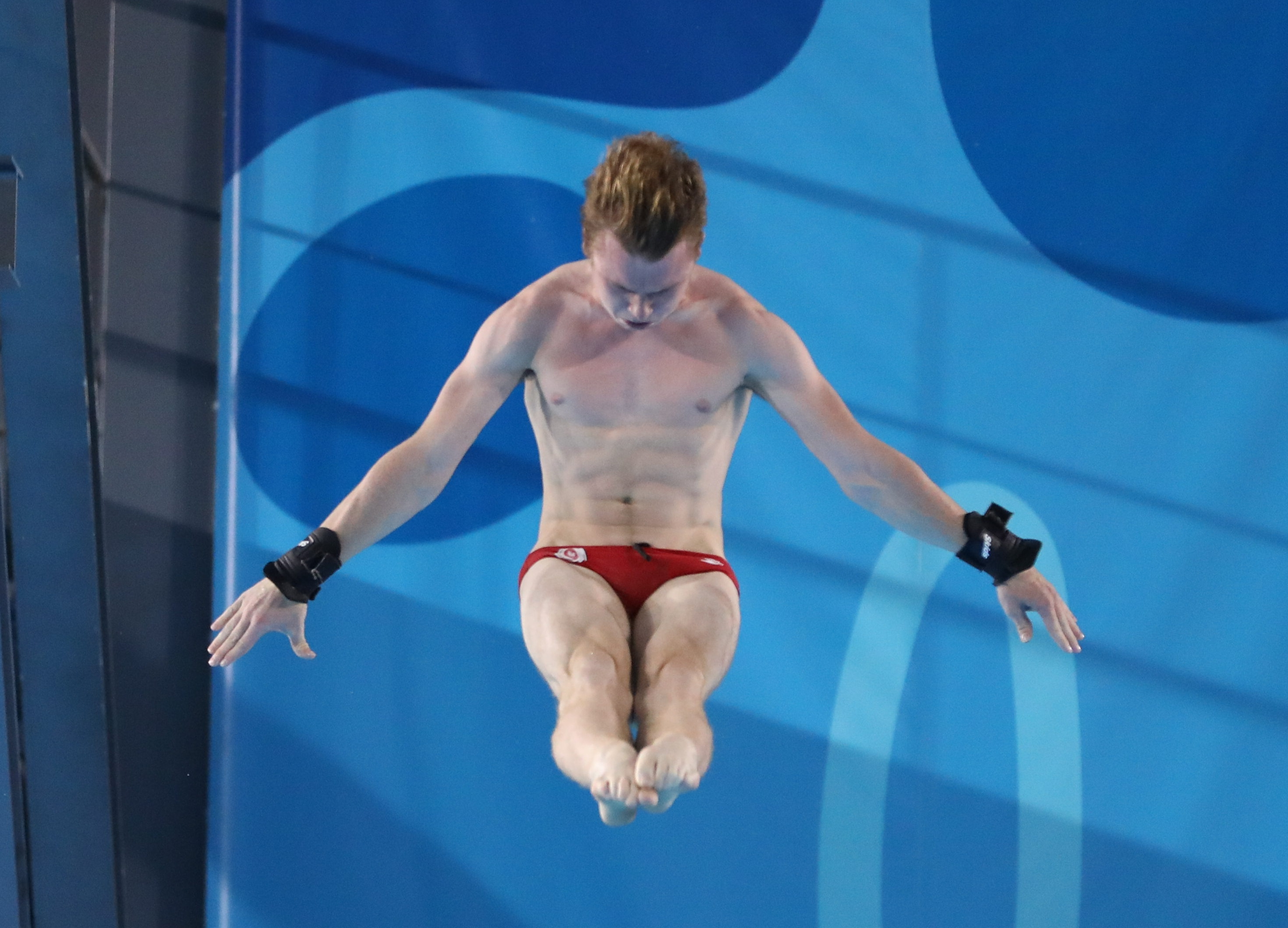
Bryden Hattie

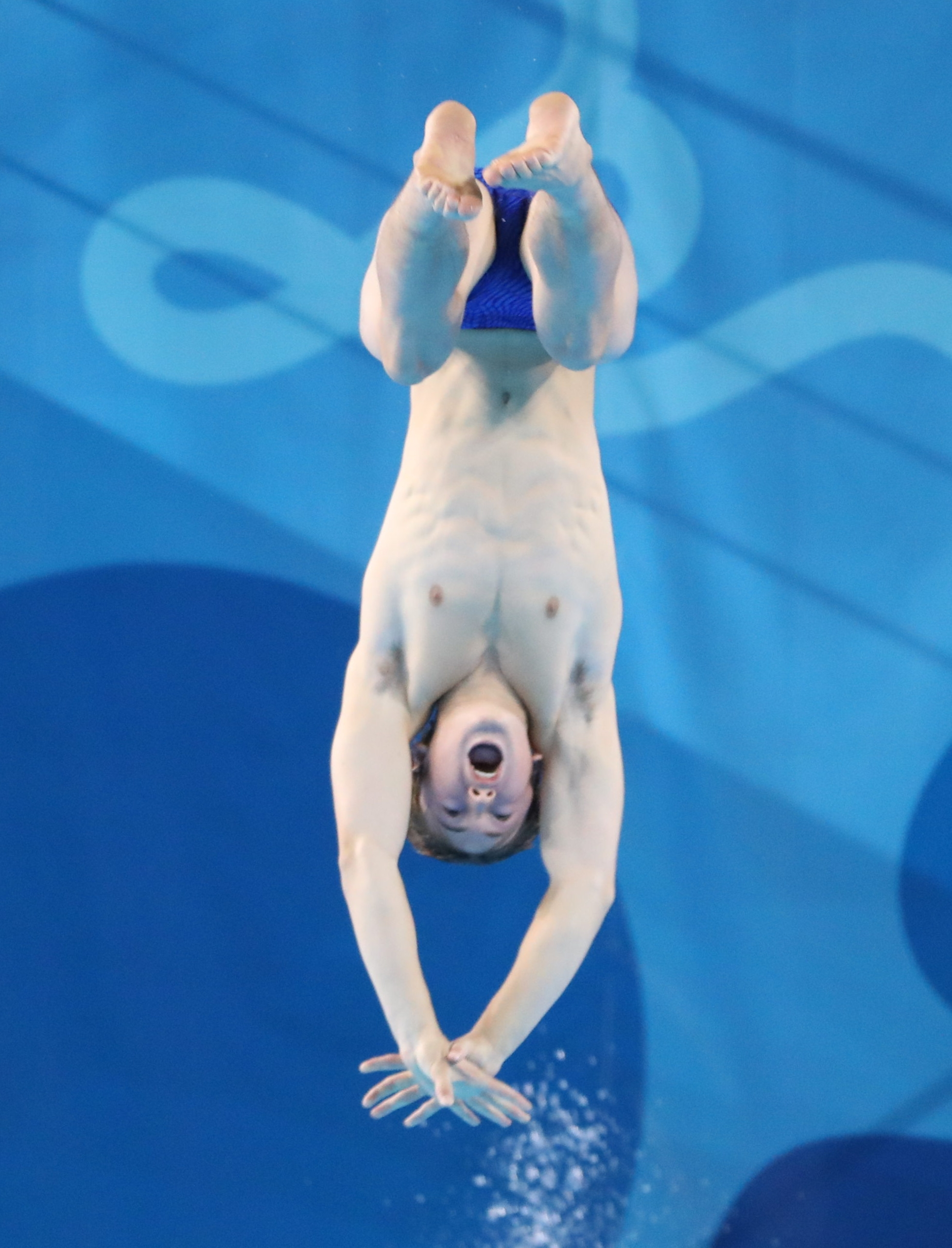
Jack Matthews

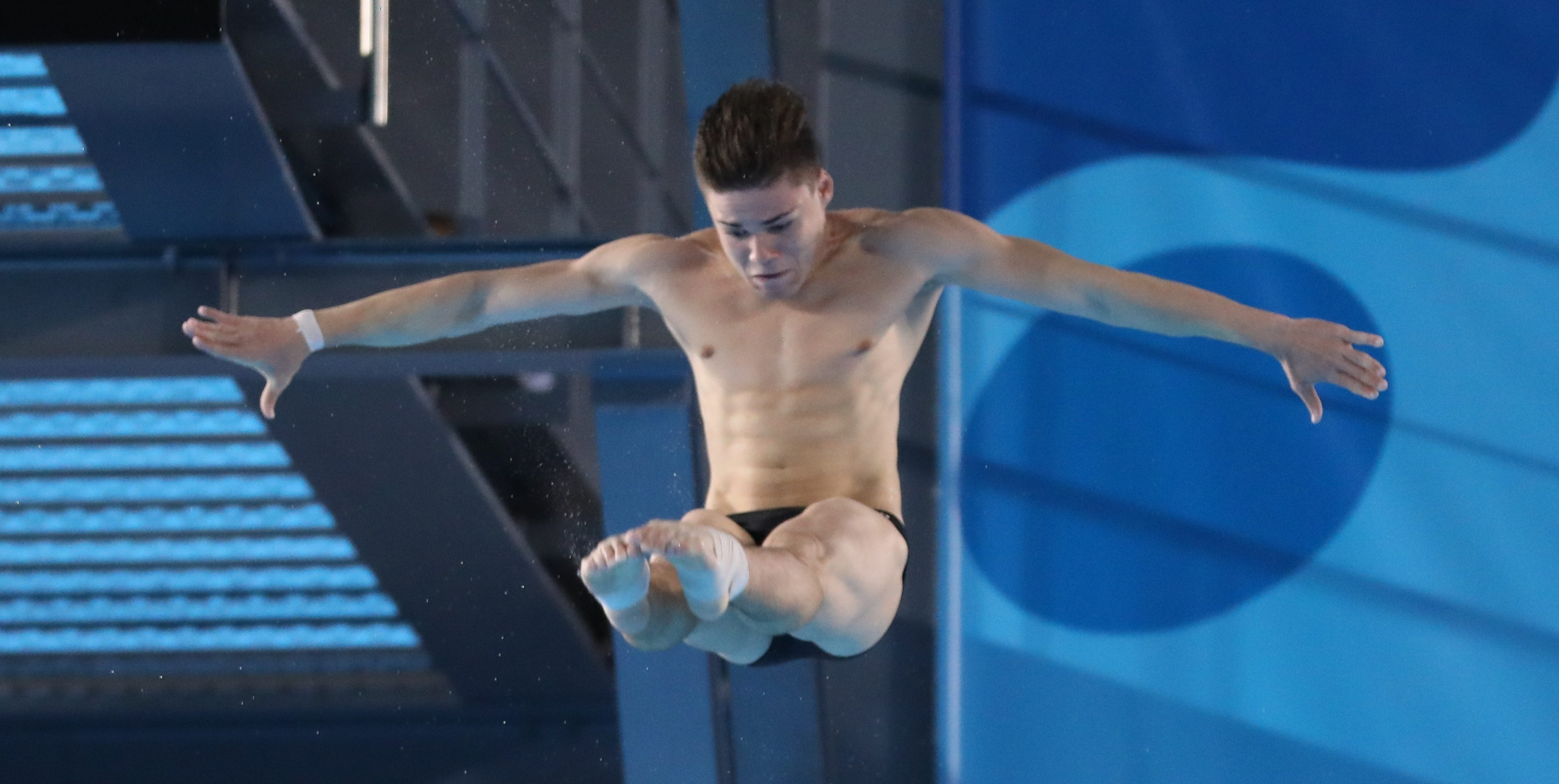
Aurelian Dragomir

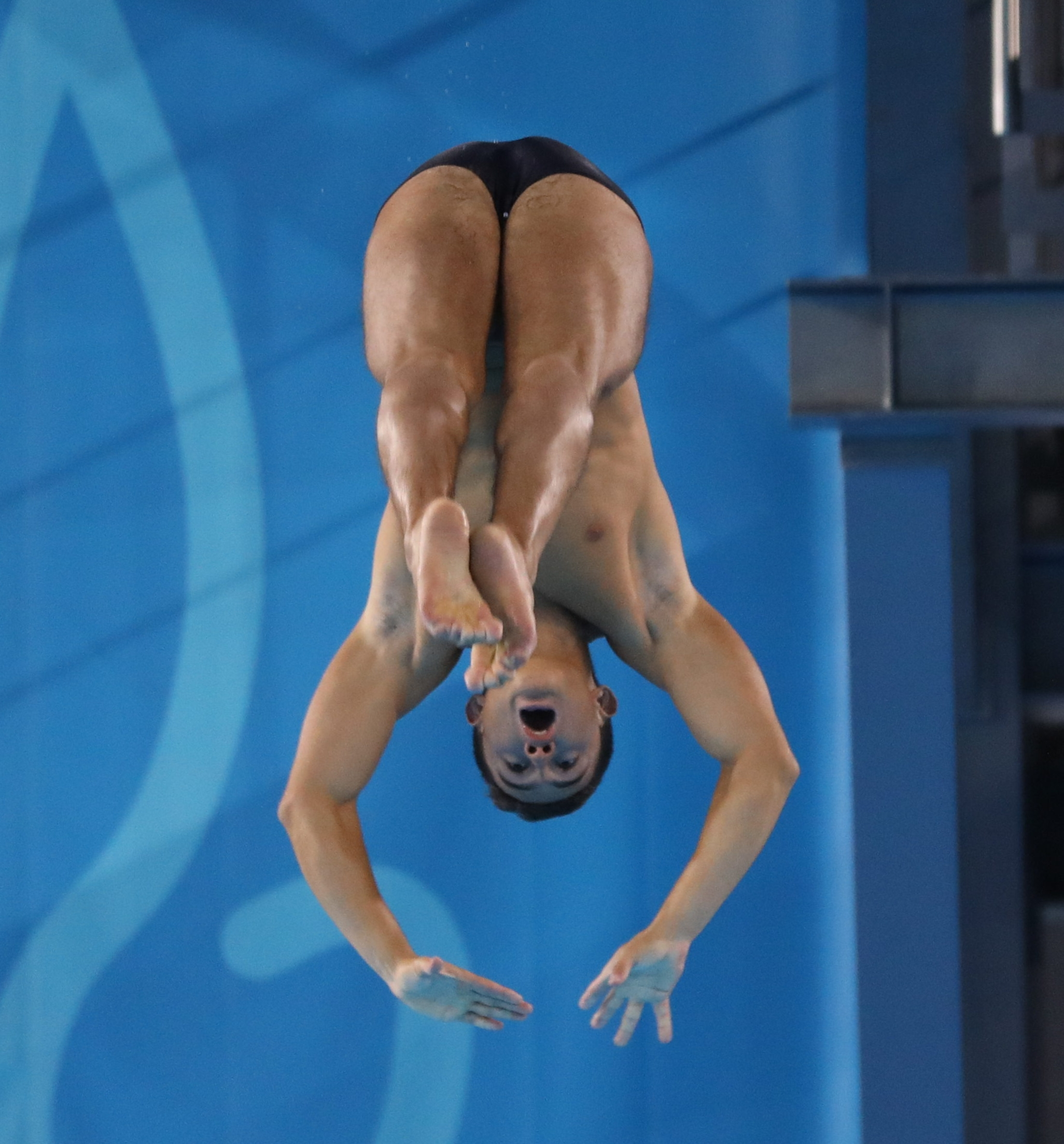
Daniel Restrepo
