= Ruslan Ternovoi =

Russian diver (born 2001)

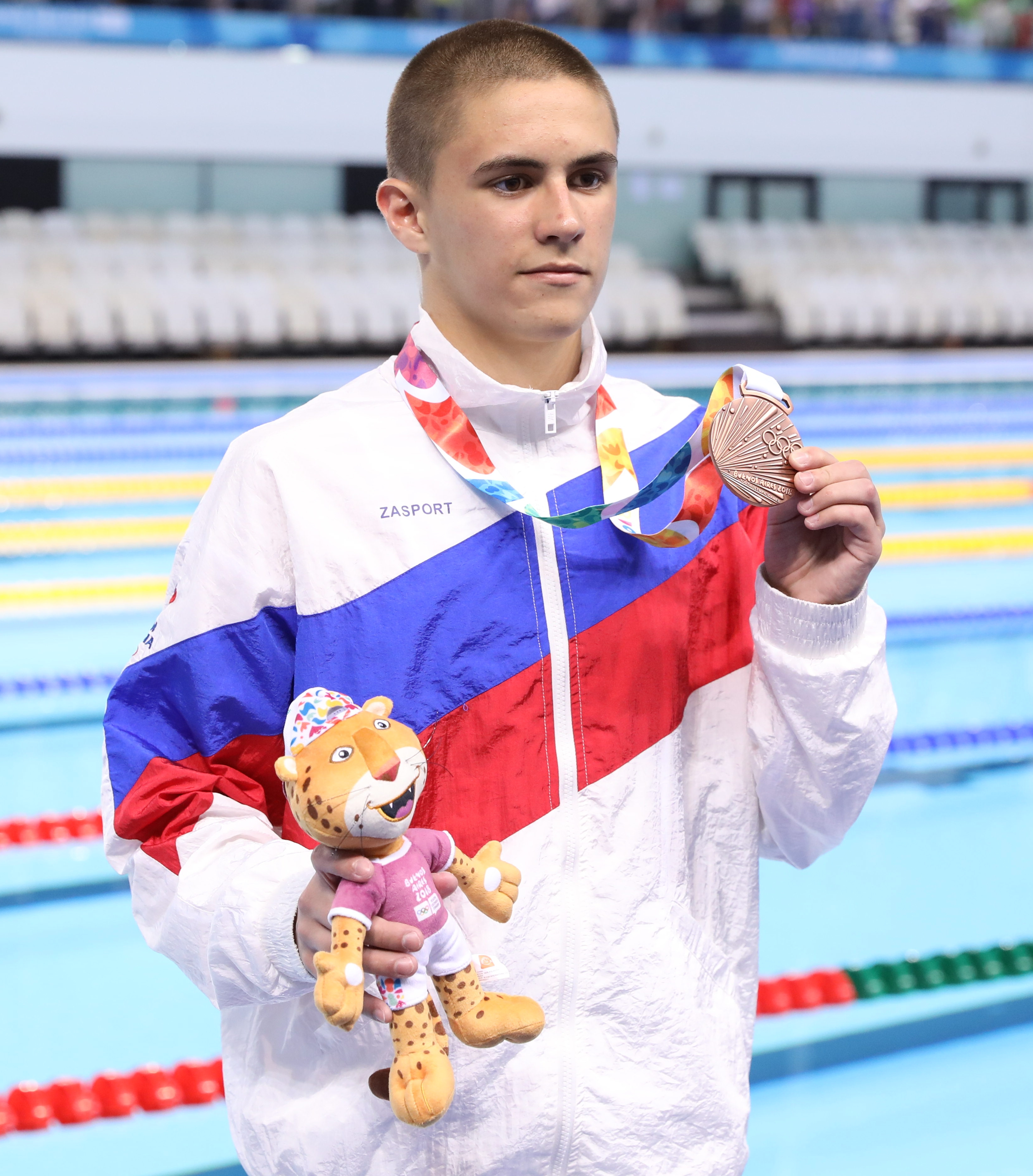
- Ruslan Ternovoi in 2018

Personal information
- Born: 10 April 2001 (age 25)

Sport
- Country: Russia
- Sport: Diving
Medal record
Men's diving
Representing Neutral Athletes B
World Championships
Silver medal – second place	2025 Singapore	10 m synchro
European Championships
Gold medal – first place	2026 Paris	10 m platform
Gold medal – first place	2026 Paris	10 m synchro
Silver medal – second place	2026 Paris	Team
Representing Russia
European Diving Championships
Bronze medal – third place	2019 Kyiv	10 m platform
Summer Youth Olympics
Bronze medal – third place	2018 Buenos Aires	3 m springboard
Bronze medal – third place	2018 Buenos Aires	10 m platform
Representing (International Olympic Committee) Mixed-NOCs
Bronze medal – third place	2018 Buenos Aires	Mixed team

Ruslan Andreyevich Ternovoi (Russian: Руслан Андреевич Терновой; born 10 April 2001) is a Russian diver. He won the bronze medal in both the boys' 3m springboard and boys' 10m platform events at the 2018 Summer Youth Olympics held in Buenos Aires, Argentina. He also won the bronze medal in the mixed team event alongside Sofiya Lyskun of Ukraine.

In 2019, he won the bronze medal in the men's 10 metre platform event at the European Diving Championships held in Kyiv, Ukraine. Ternovoi and Uliana Kliueva finished in 5th place in the mixed 3 m springboard synchro event.
