= 2019 European Diving Championships – Men's 10 metre platform =

Men's 10 metre platform event at the 2019 European Diving Championships was contested on 11 August. Ukrainian Oleksii Sereda, aged 13 years and seven months at the time, won the gold medal becoming the youngest European Diving champion ever.

== Results ==
19 athletes participated at the event; the best 12 from the preliminary round qualified for the final.

=== Preliminary round ===
Rank	Diver	Nationality	D1	D2	D3	D4	D5	D6	Total
1	Oleksii Sereda	Ukraine	76.50	58.80	66.00	86.40	83.20	76.80	447.70
2	Nikita Shleikher	Russia	72.00	64.80	48.10	82.80	81.60	81.00	430.30
3	Timo Barthel	Germany	73.80	72.00	69.30	63.00	86.70	60.80	425.60
4	Noah Williams	Great Britain	81.00	81.00	68.80	73.10	44.40	75.60	423.90
5	Benjamin Auffret	France	52.80	66.30	75.00	89.10	59.40	63.00	405.60
6	Ruslan Ternovoi	Russia	86.40	59.50	64.35	72.60	84.60	35.15	402.60
7	Matthew Dixon	Great Britain	73.60	67.20	74.25	42.55	66.30	67.20	391.10
8	Riccardo Giovannini	Italy	63.00	54.00	65.60	64.35	69.30	57.60	373.85
9	Oleh Serbin	Ukraine	80.00	44.55	22.10	72.00	70.40	73.60	362.65
10	Vinko Paradzik	Sweden	67.20	57.60	63.00	59.40	52.70	61.20	361.10
11	Constantin Popovici	Romania	73.60	45.90	70.20	67.50	54.40	48.00	359.60
12	Lou Massenberg	Germany	67.20	64.50	52.80	52.80	47.60	67.20	352.10
13	Andreas Larsen	Italy	47.85	62.70	66.00	39.10	57.60	62.90	336.15
14	Lev Sargsyan	Armenia	48.00	63.00	59.40	46.80	61.20	54.40	332.80
15	Dariush Lotfi	Austria	42.00	61.05	65.60	52.80	57.60	36.00	315.05
16	Vladimir Harutyunyan	Armenia	38.40	63.00	27.00	67.20	57.80	57.60	311.00
17	Artsiom Barouski	Belarus	59.20	49.50	67.65	30.40	35.75	48.00	290.45
18	Martin Bang Christensen	Denmark	54.40	25.60	34.65	37.40	49.50	62.90	264.45
19	Kıvanç Gür	Turkey	43.20	14.50	35.00	45.00	22.50	46.20	206.40

=== Final ===
Rank	Diver	Nationality	D1	D2	D3	D4	D5	D6	Total
1st place, gold medalist(s)	Oleksii Sereda	Ukraine	78.00	75.60	80.85	81.60	91.20	81.60	488.85
2nd place, silver medalist(s)	Benjamin Auffret	France	67.20	91.80	76.50	82.50	75.90	81.00	474.90
3rd place, bronze medalist(s)	Ruslan Ternovoi	Russia	81.60	39.10	79.20	79.20	79.20	86.95	445.25
4	Nikita Shleikher	Russia	76.80	70.20	79.55	55.80	79.90	82.80	445.05
5	Constantin Popovici	Romania	72.00	79.90	61.20	70.50	72.00	75.20	430.80
6	Oleh Serbin	Ukraine	80.00	59.40	71.40	76.50	56.00	81.60	424.90
7	Timo Barthel	Germany	75.60	75.20	70.95	67.50	66.30	67.20	422.75
8	Matthew Dixon	Great Britain	76.80	73.60	74.25	37.00	71.40	72.00	405.05
9	Noah Williams	Great Britain	72.00	79.20	64.00	30.60	75.85	81.00	402.65
10	Riccardo Giovannini	Italy	71.40	58.50	44.80	69.30	79.20	62.40	385.60
11	Lou Massenberg	Germany	67.20	67.50	67.65	57.60	51.00	70.40	381.35
12	Vinko Paradzik	Sweden	65.60	73.80	67.50	36.00	30.60	62.90	336.40
