= Diving at the 2018 Summer Youth Olympics – Boys' 3m springboard =

Boys' 3m springboard at the III Summer Youth Olympic Games
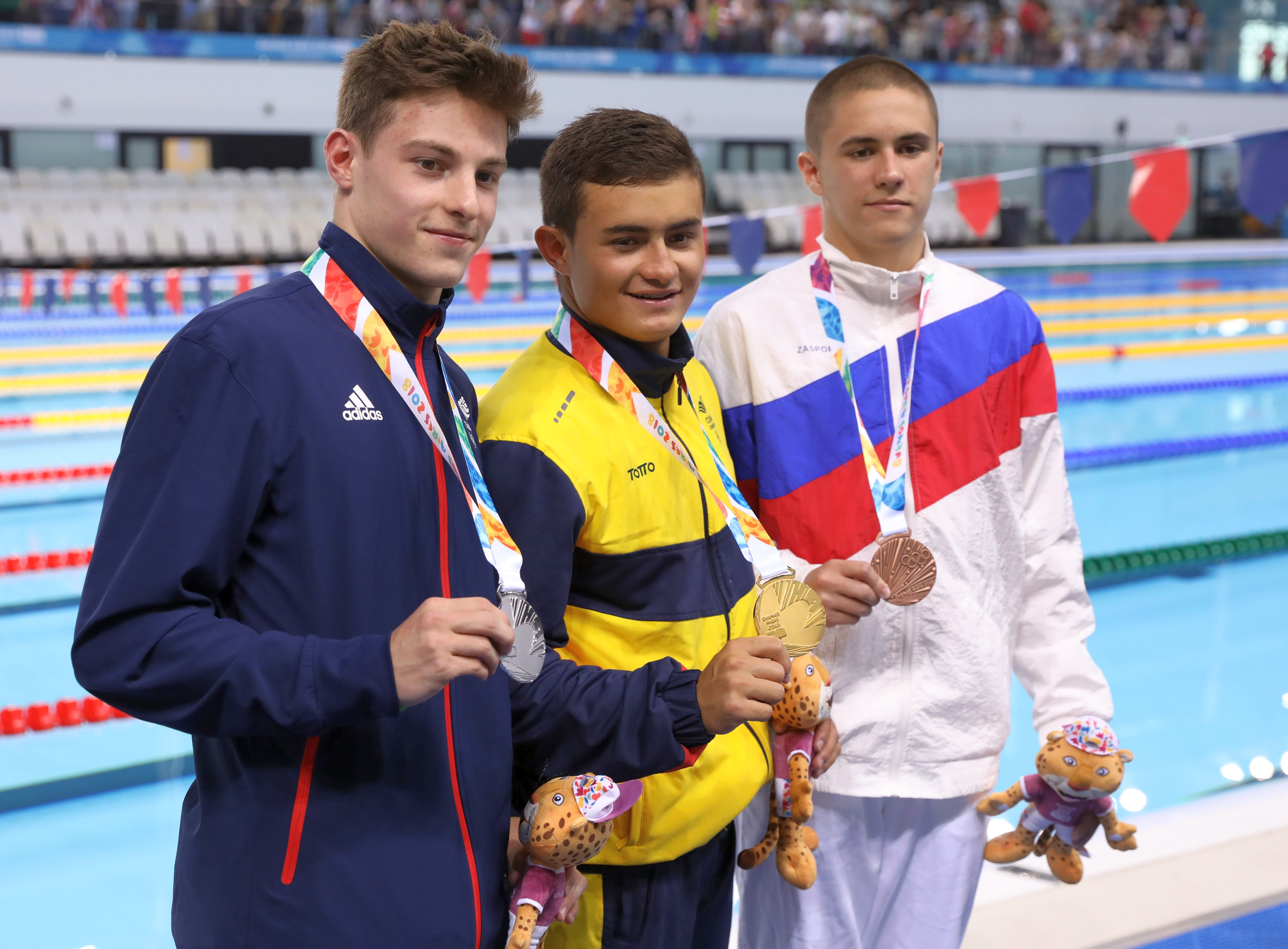
- Medal Winners
- Venue: Natatorium
- Dates: 14 October
- Competitors: 14 from 14 nations

Medalists
1st place, gold medalist(s)		Daniel Restrepo	Colombia
2nd place, silver medalist(s)		Anthony Harding	Great Britain
3rd place, bronze medalist(s)		Ruslan Ternovoi	Russia

These are the results for the boys' 3m springboard event at the 2018 Summer Youth Olympics.

== Results ==
Rank	Diver	Nation	Preliminary		Final	
Rank	Diver	Nation	Points	Rank	Points	Rank
1st place, gold medalist(s)	Daniel Restrepo	Colombia	511.95	6	576.05	1
2nd place, silver medalist(s)	Anthony Harding	Great Britain	534.95	2	559.50	2
3rd place, bronze medalist(s)	Ruslan Ternovoi	Russia	486.65	9	551.20	3
4	Matthew Carter	Australia	525.45	3	543.25	4
5	Randal Willars	Mexico	497.70	8	528.10	5
6	Lou Massenberg	Germany	512.20	5	515.40	6
7	Antonio Volpe	Italy	509.05	7	515.15	7
8	Bryden Hattie	Canada	517.95	4	504.50	8
9	Jack Matthews	United States	475.15	12	501.15	9
10	Lian Junjie	China	573.10	1	496.30	10
11	Jules Bouyer	France	483.40	10	487.80	11
12	Dylan Vork	Netherlands	477.35	11	457.75	12
13	Adrián Abadía	Spain	463.10	13	did not advance	
14	Aurelian Dragomir	Romania	386.00	14	did not advance	

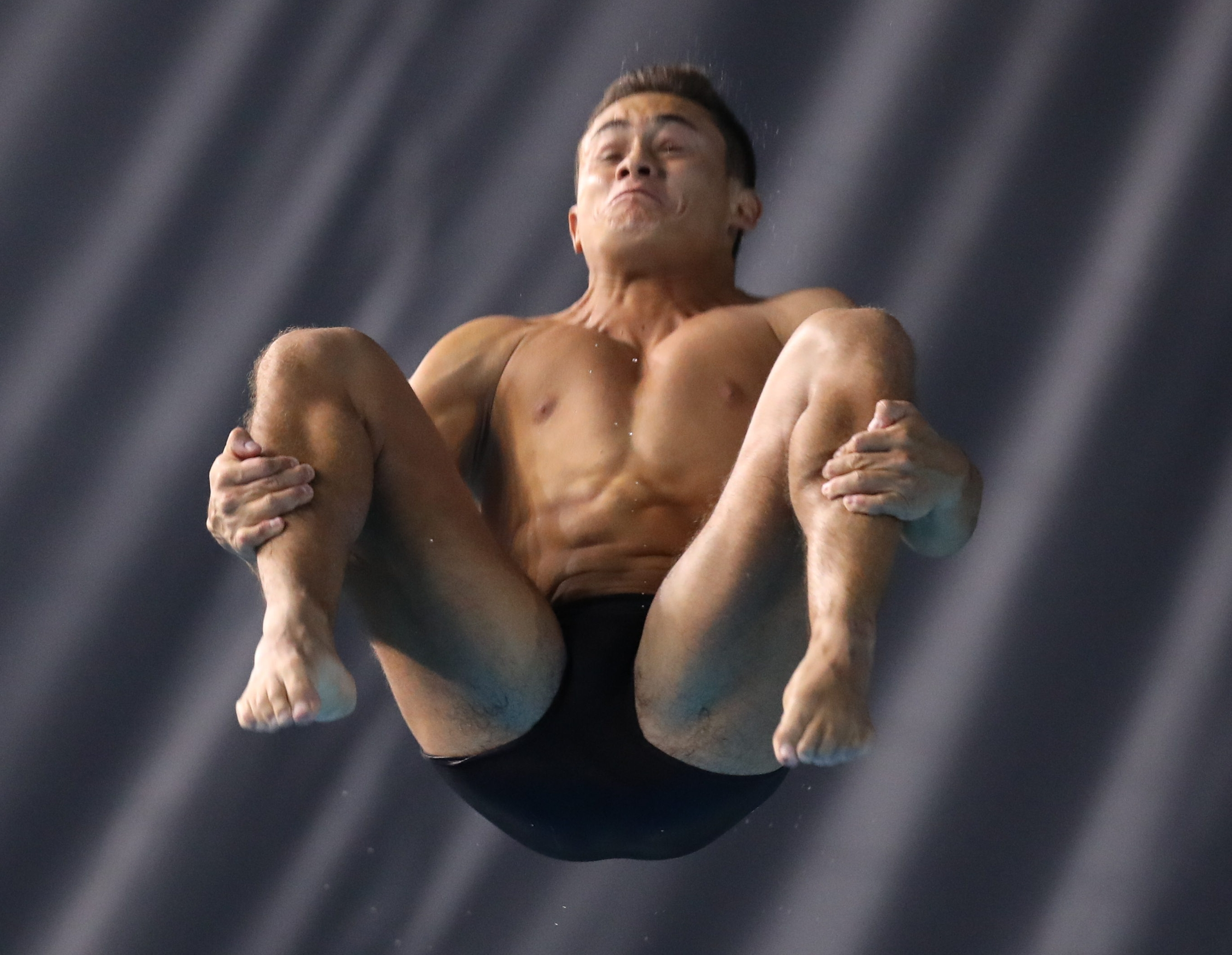
Daniel Restrepo

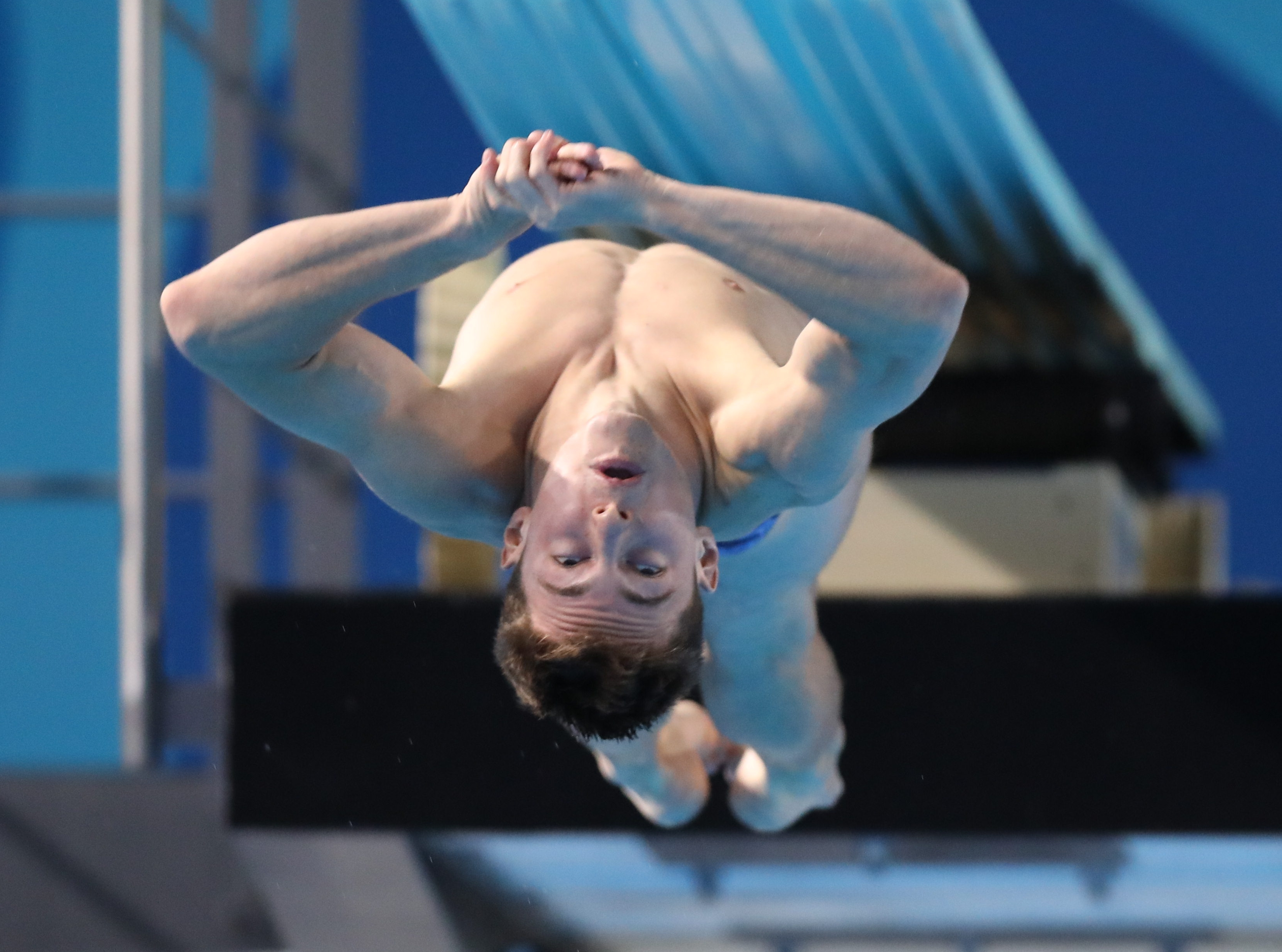
Anthony Harding

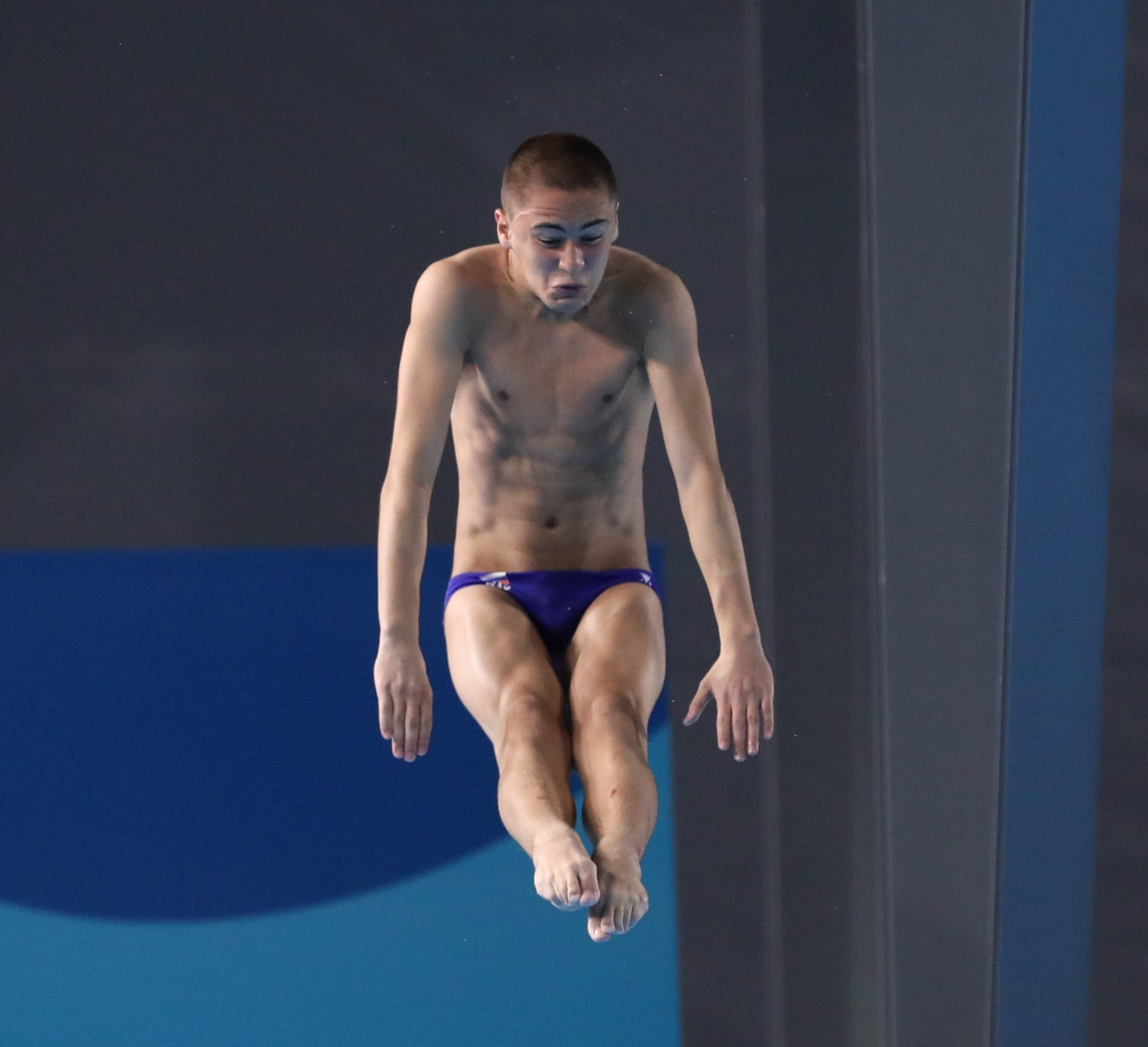
Ruslan Ternovoi

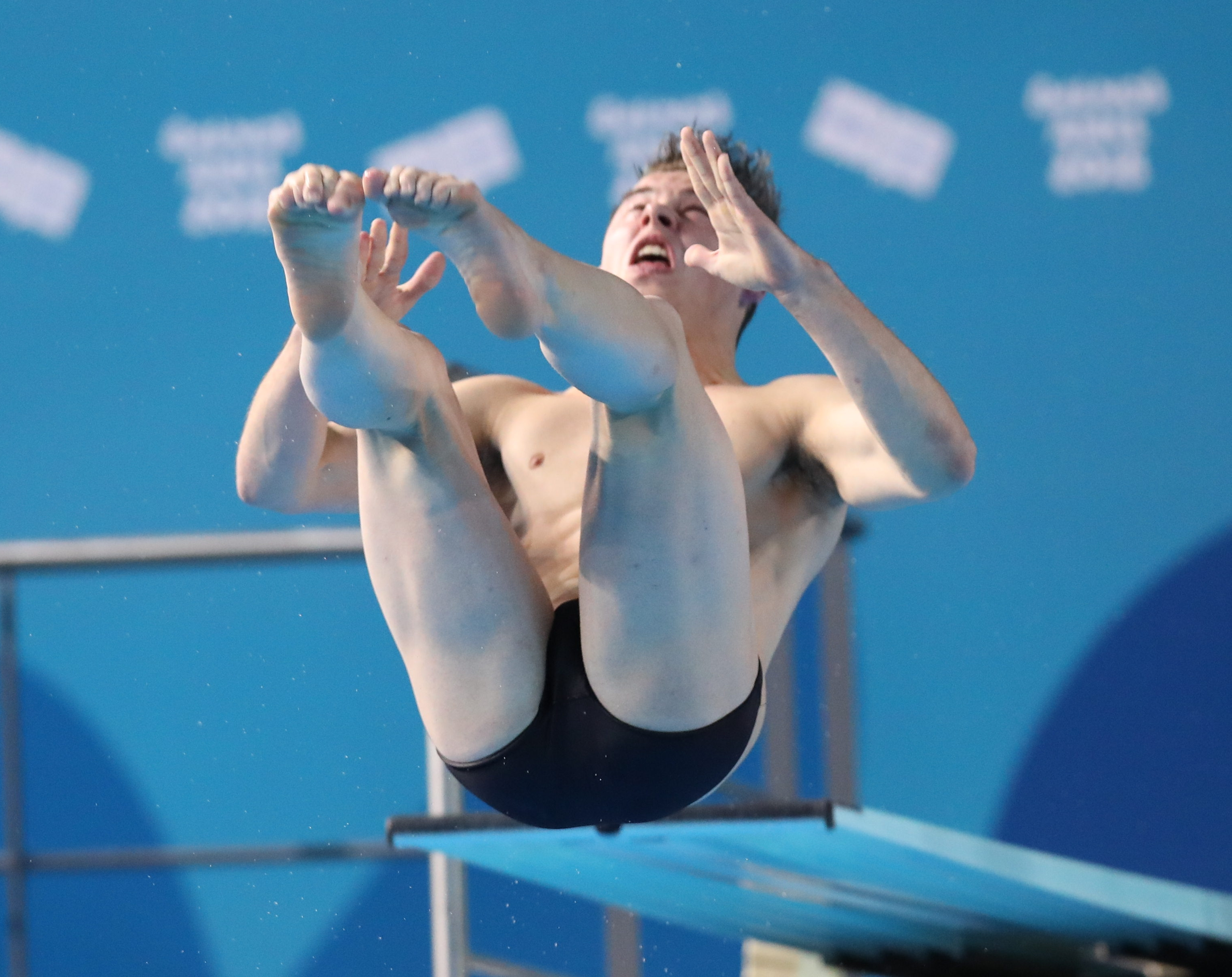
Matthew Carter

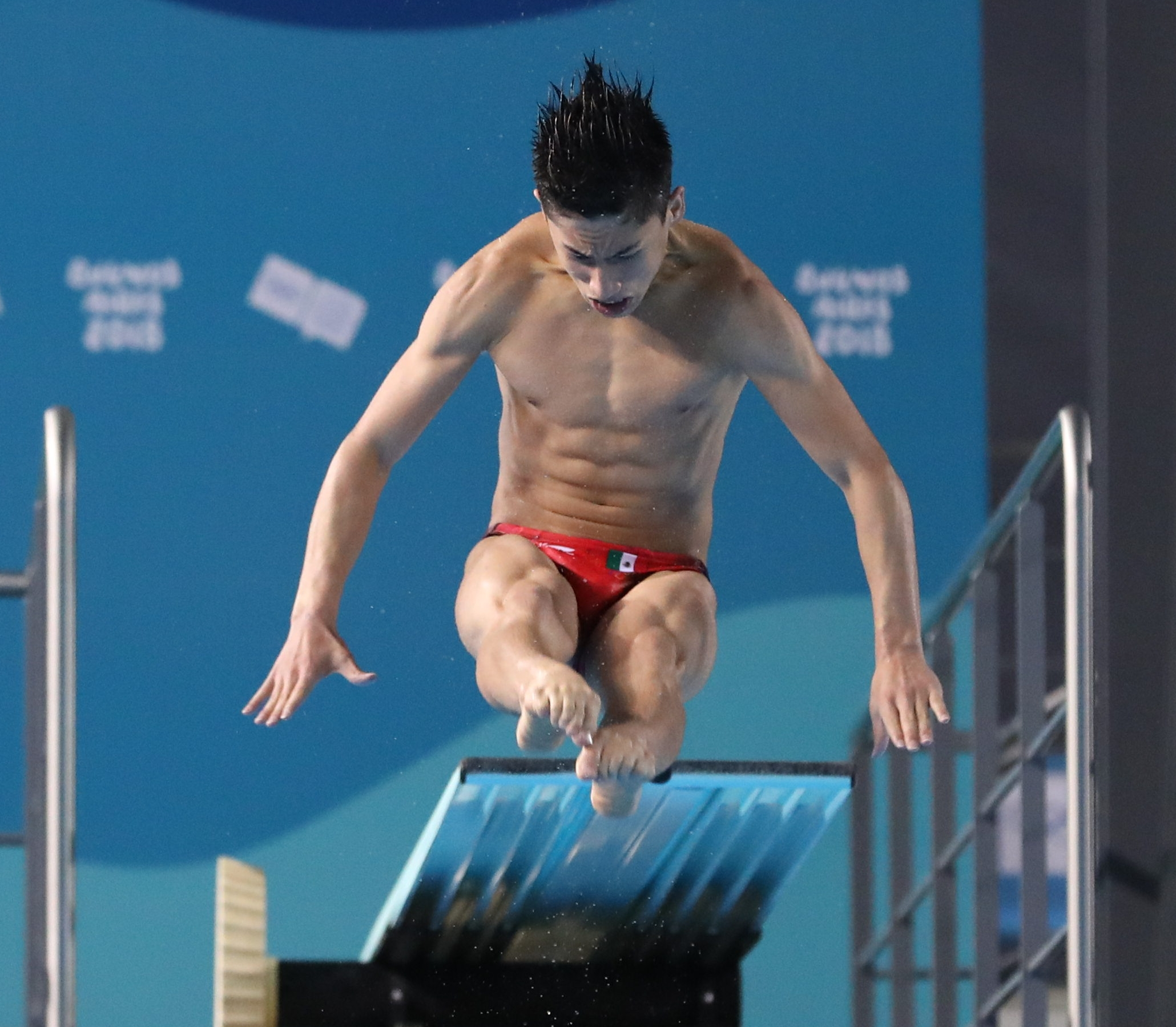
Randal Willars

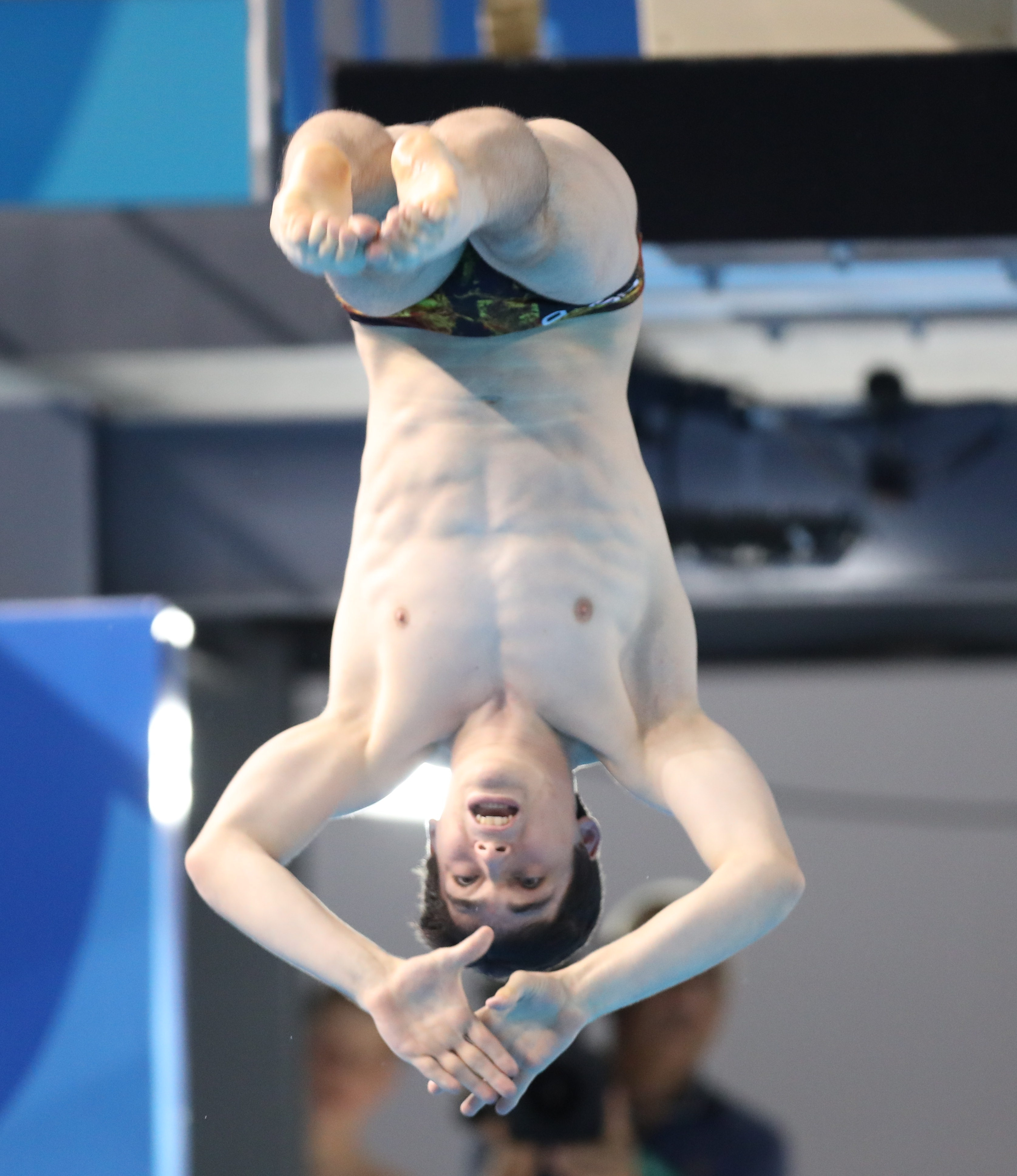
Lou Massenberg

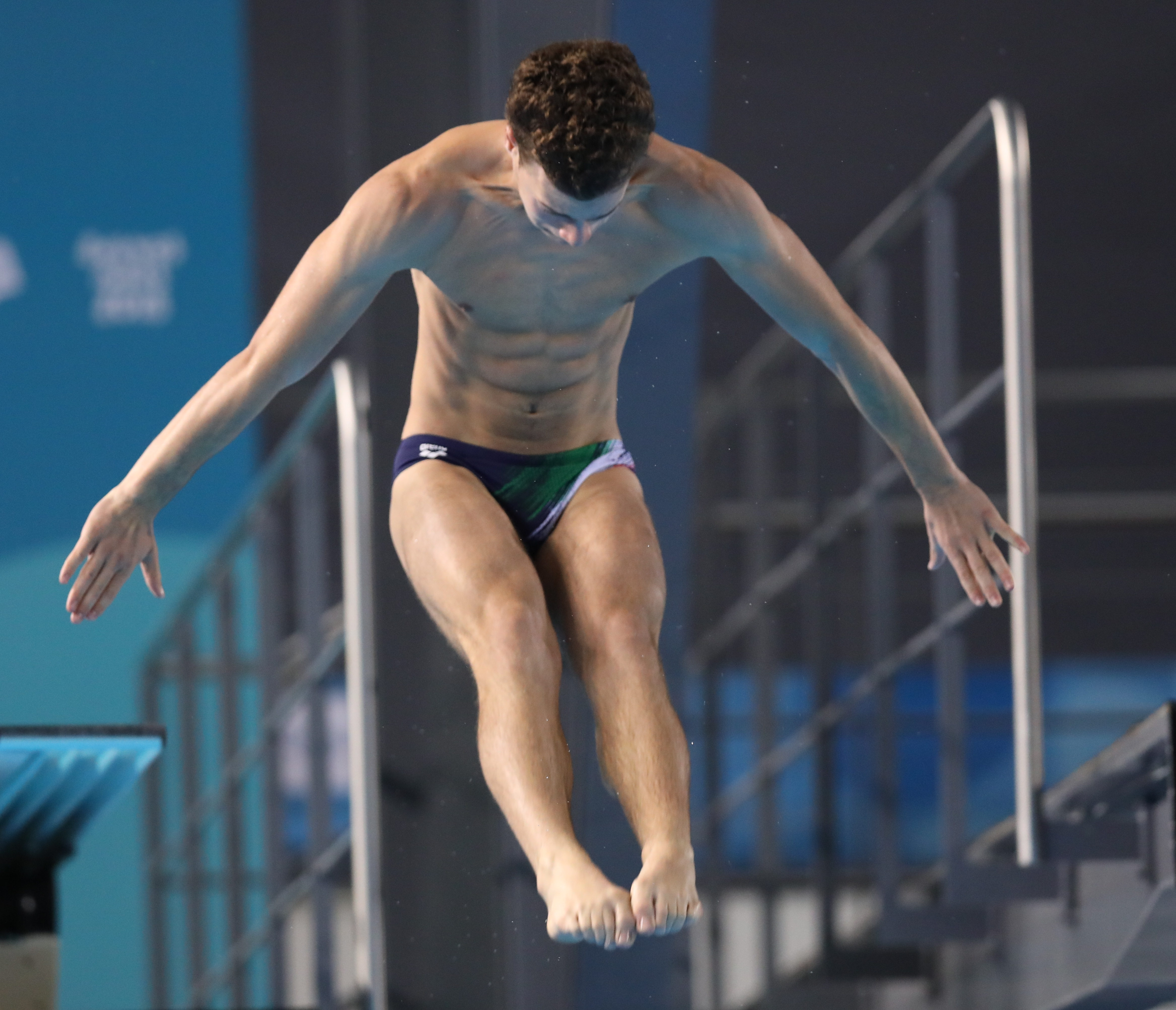
Antonio Volpe

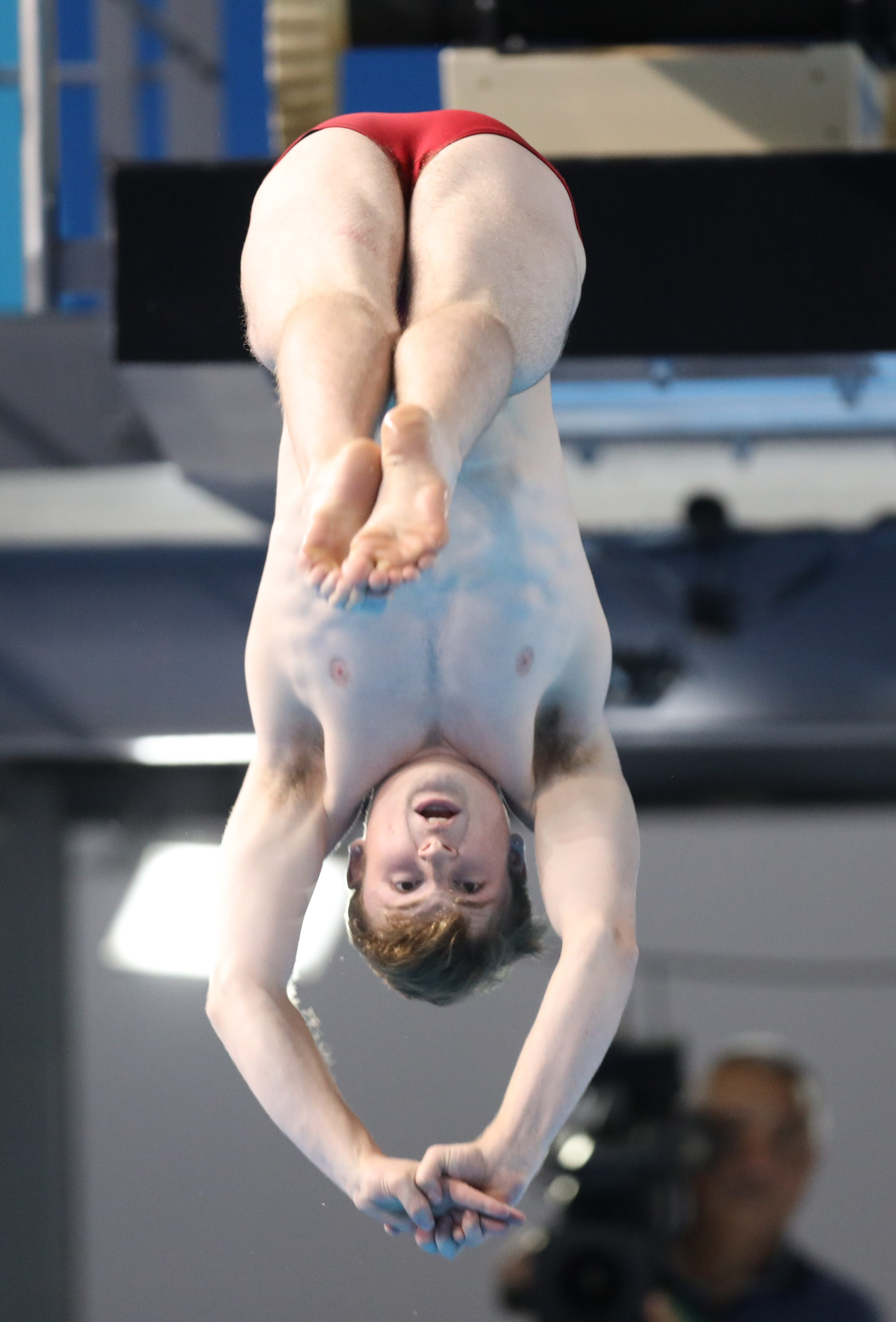
Bryden Hattie

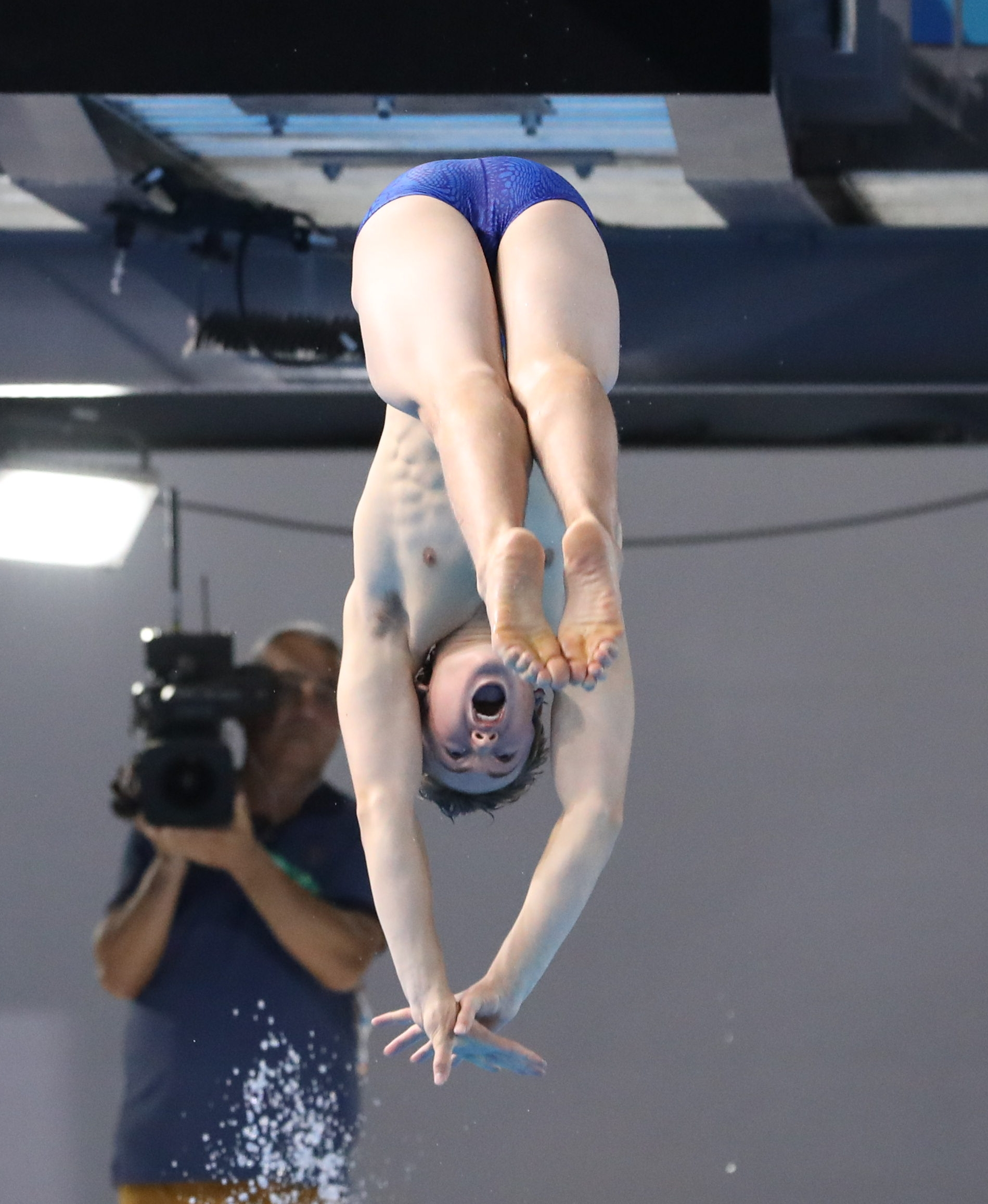
Jack Matthews

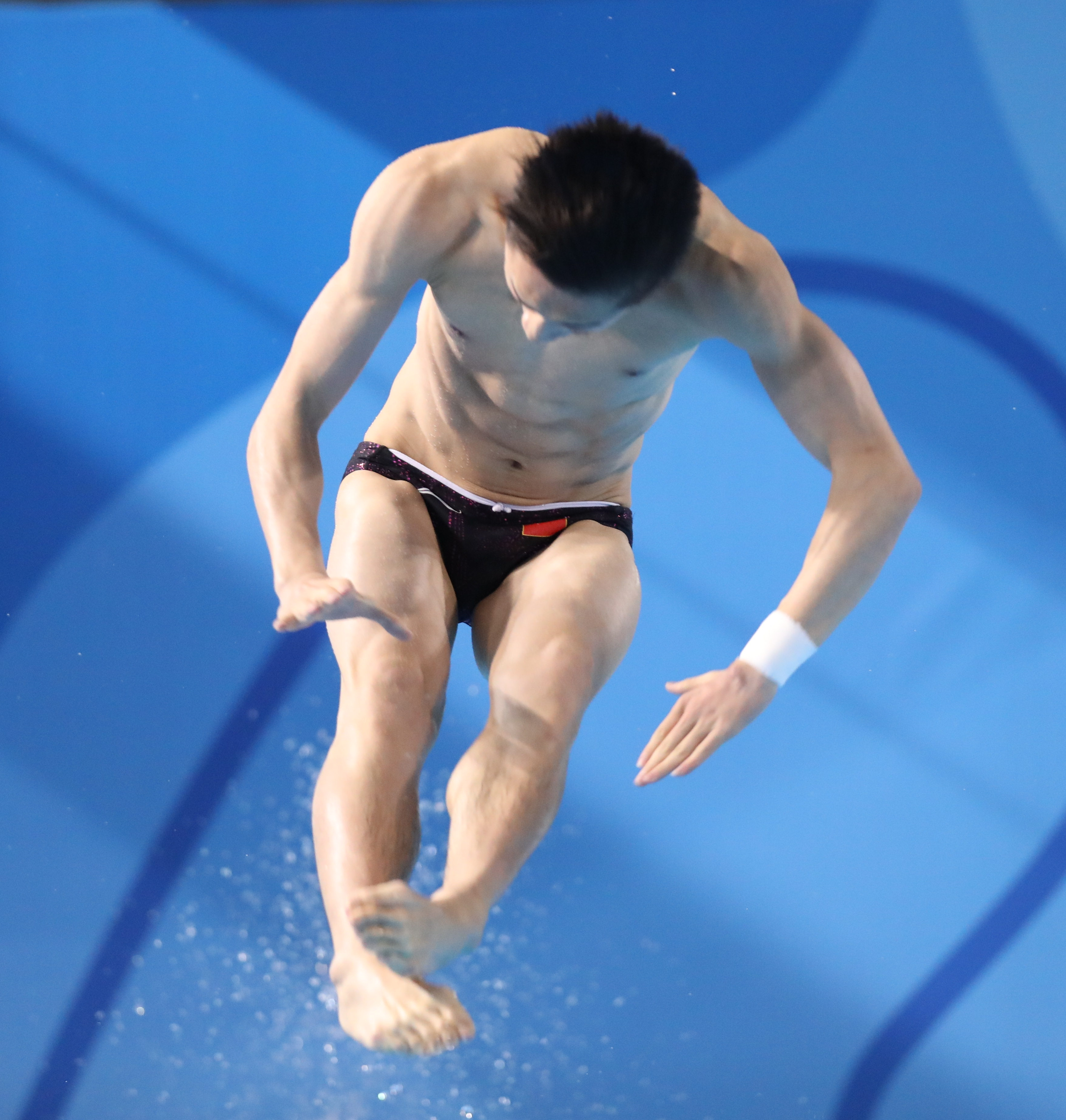
Lian Junjie

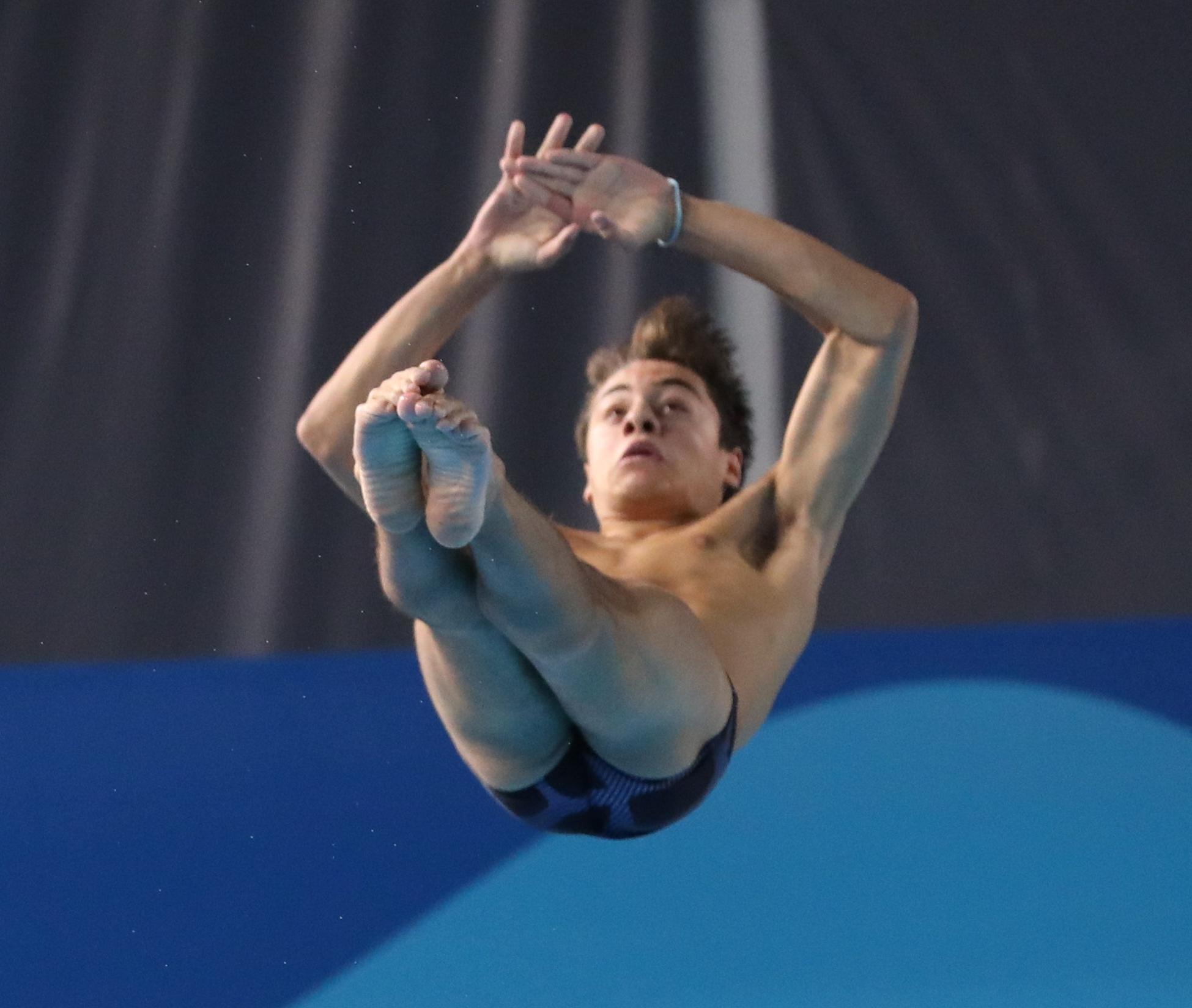
Jules Bouyer

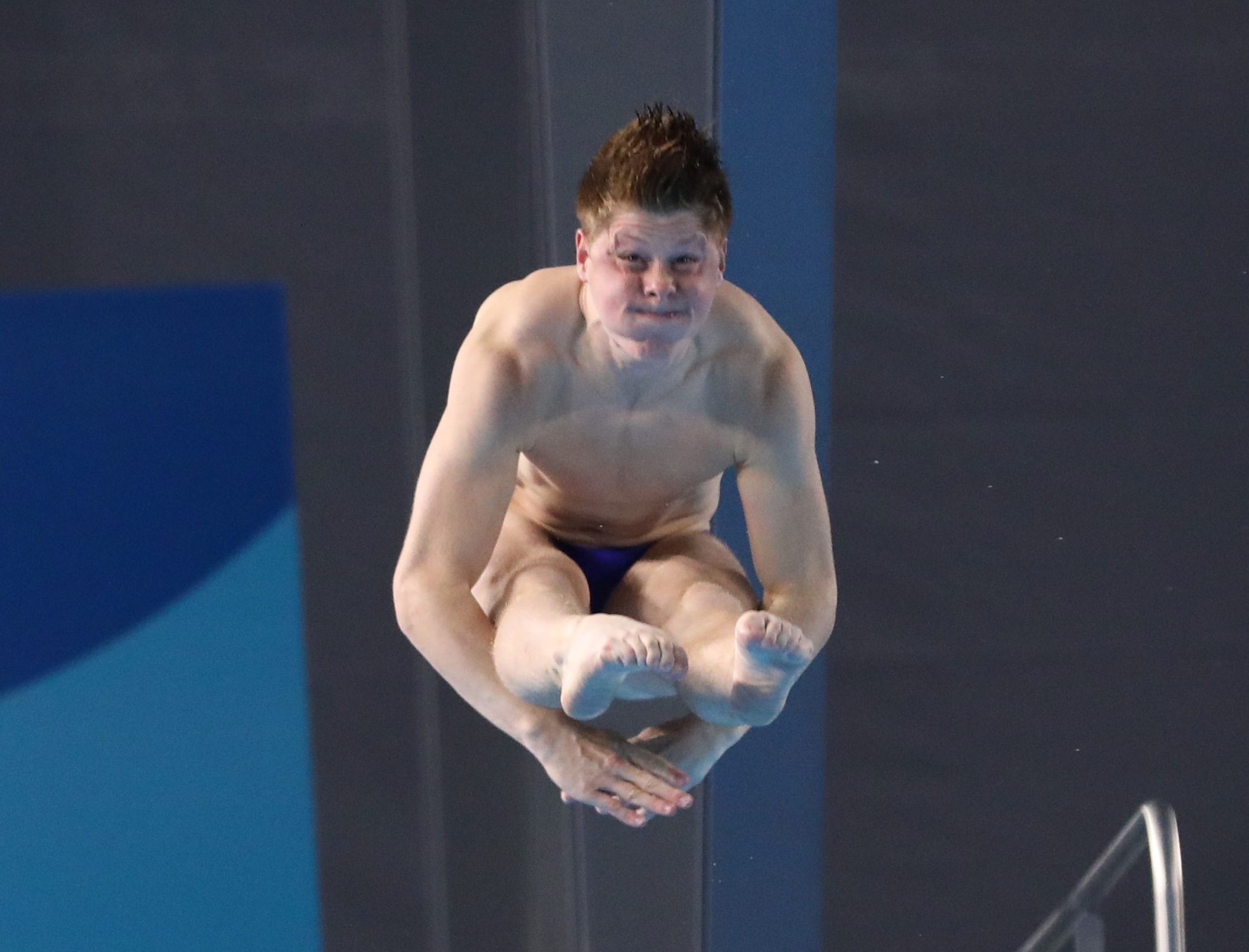
Dylan Vork
