= Benjamin Auffret =

French diver (born 1995)

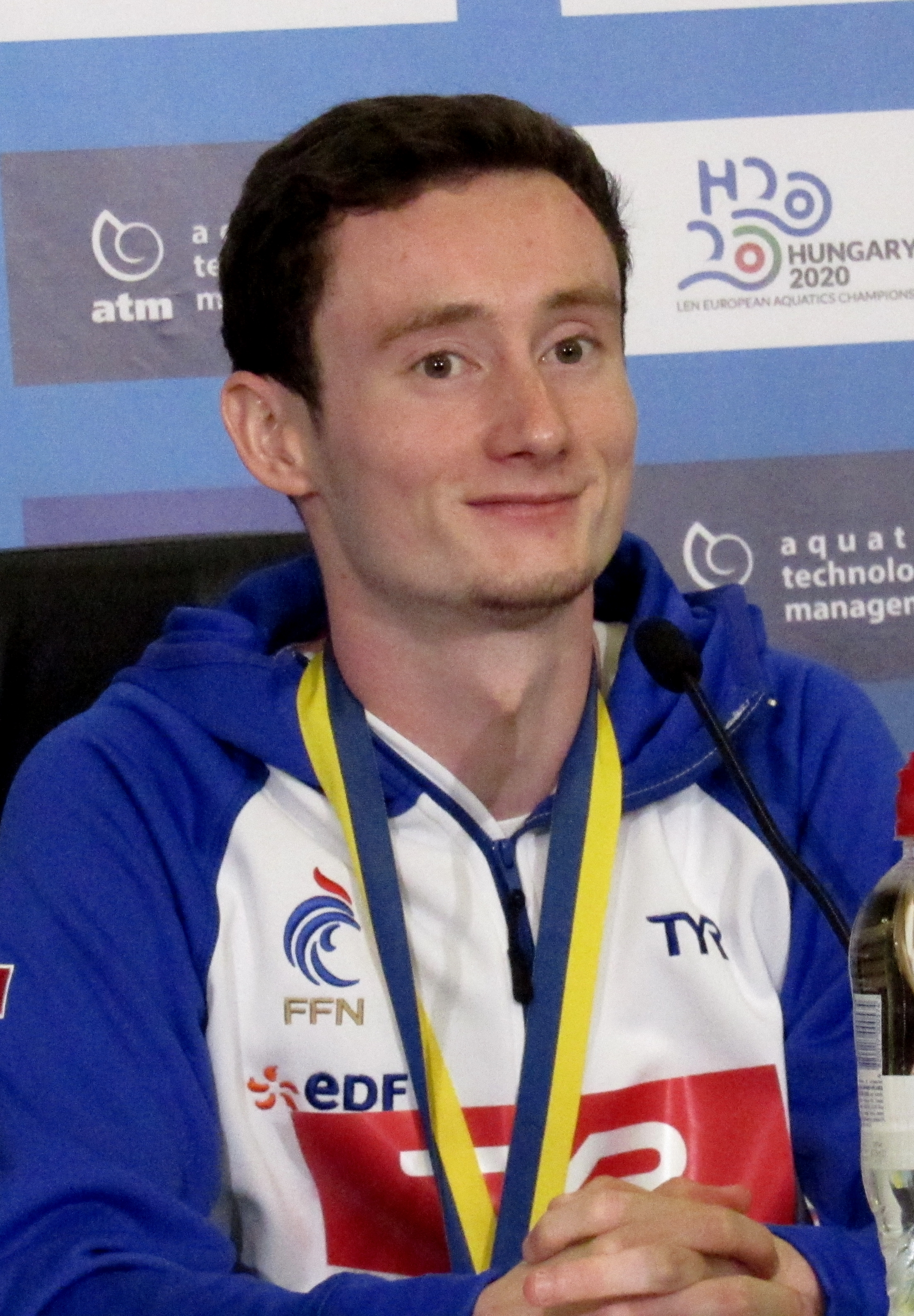

Personal information
- Nationality: French
- Born: 15 March 1995 (age 31)

Sport
- Country: France
- Sport: Diving
- Retired: April 2021
Medal record
European Championships
Silver medal – second place	2018 Glasgow	10 m platform
European Diving Championships
Gold medal – first place	2017 Kyiv	10 m platform
Silver medal – second place	2019 Kyiv	10 m platform

Benjamin Auffret (born 15 March 1995) is a French diver and European champion in diving from 10m platform.

== Career ==
He competed at the 2016 Summer Olympics in Rio de Janeiro, in the men's 10 metre platform.

He is the 2017 European champion in men's 10 metre platform.

He qualified to represent France at the 2020 Summer Olympics. However, he announced his retirement in April 2021 three month before the Summer Olympics in Tokyo.
