= Diving at the 2018 Summer Youth Olympics – Mixed team =

Mixed team at the III Summer Youth Olympic Games
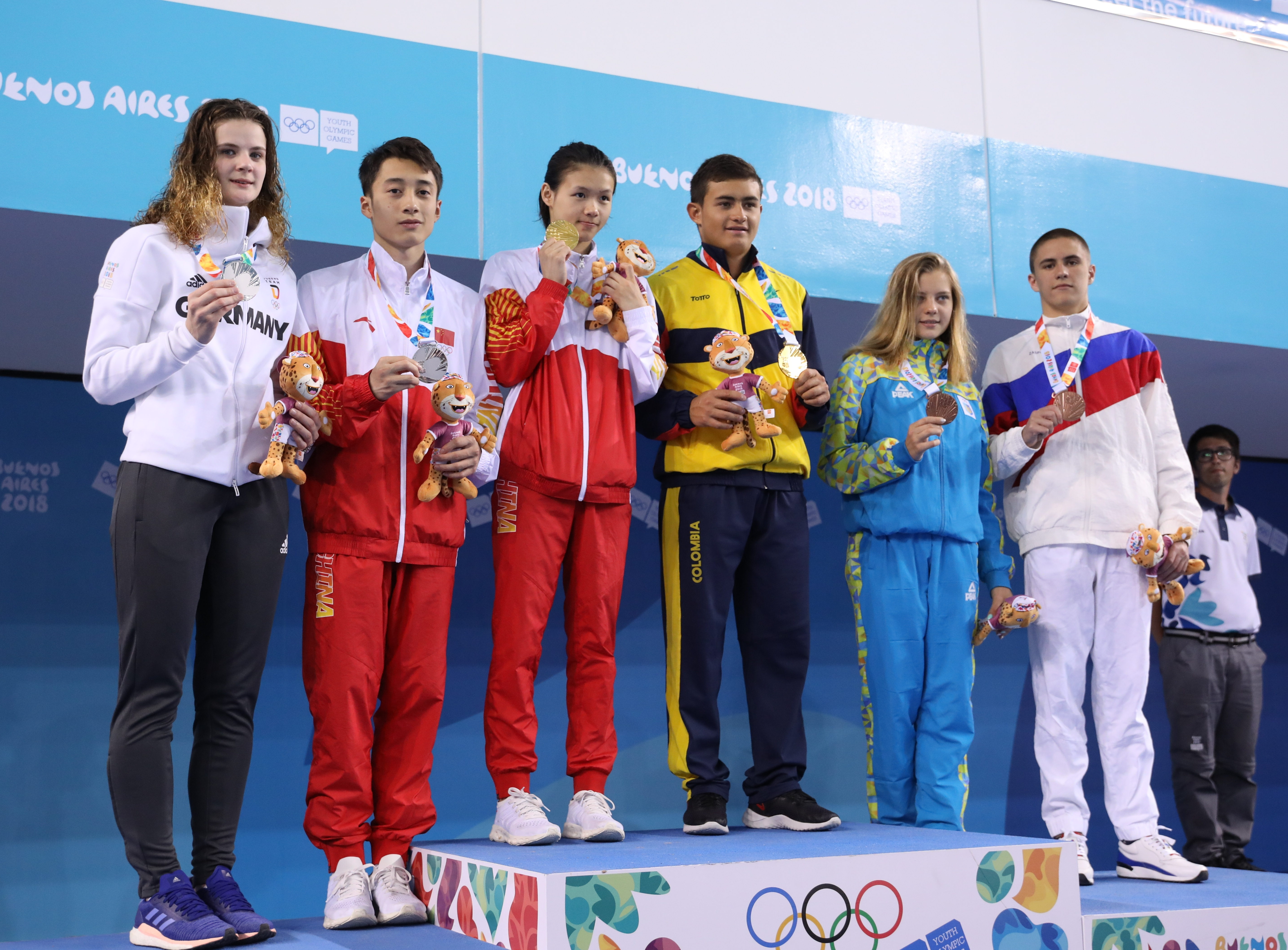
- Venue: Natatorium
- Dates: 17 October
- Competitors: 28 from 18 nations

Medalists
1st place, gold medalist(s)		Lin Shan; Daniel Restrepo	Mixed-NOCs
2nd place, silver medalist(s)		Elena Wassen; Lian Junjie	Mixed-NOCs
3rd place, bronze medalist(s)		Sofiya Lyskun; Ruslan Ternovoi	Mixed-NOCs

These are the results for the mixed team event at the 2018 Summer Youth Olympics.

== Results ==
Rank	Team	Points
1st place, gold medalist(s)	Lin Shan (CHN); Daniel Restrepo (COL)	391.35
2nd place, silver medalist(s)	Elena Wassen (GER); Lian Junjie (CHN)	390.10
3rd place, bronze medalist(s)	Sofiya Lyskun (UKR); Ruslan Ternovoi (RUS)	371.15
4	Kimberly Bong (MAS); Nikolaos Molvalis (GRE)	347.10
5	Maria Papworth (GBR); Bryden Hattie (CAN)	340.50
6	Chiara Pellacani (ITA); Oleh Serbin (UKR)	333.40
7	Mélodie Leclerc (CAN); Jellson Jabillin (MAS)	330.00
8	Michelle Heimberg (SUI); Lou Massenberg (GER)	328.50
9	Uliana Kliueva (RUS); Aurelian Dragomir (ROU)	310.20
10	Gabriela Agundes (MEX); Antonio Volpe (ITA)	309.00
11	Helle Tuxen (NOR); Randal Willars (MEX)	301.10
12	Ronja Rundgren (FIN); Anthony Harding (GBR)	299.10
13	Bridget O'Neil (USA); Jack Matthews (USA)	263.70
14	Anna dos Santos (BRA); Dylan Vork (NED)	241.35

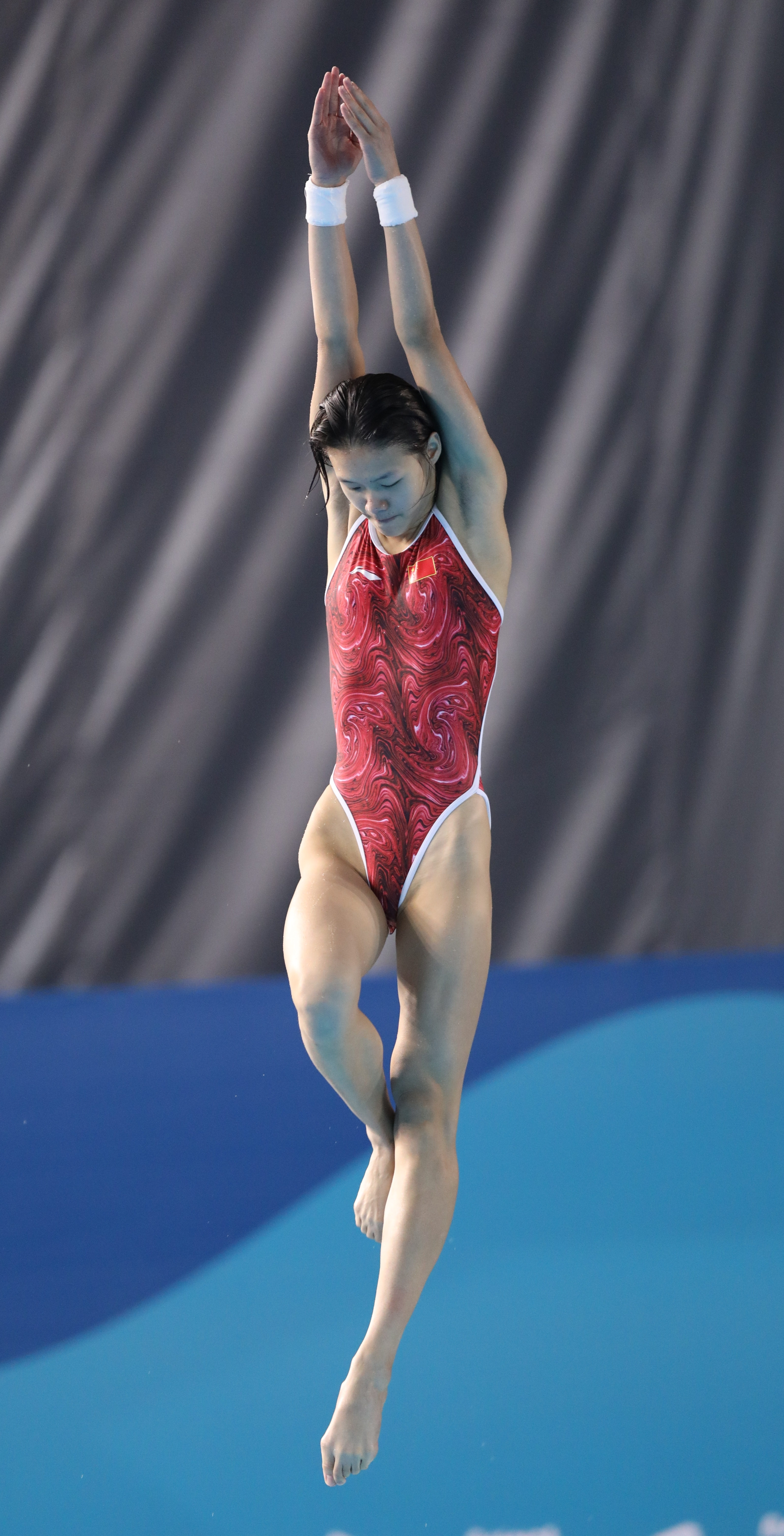
Lin Shan

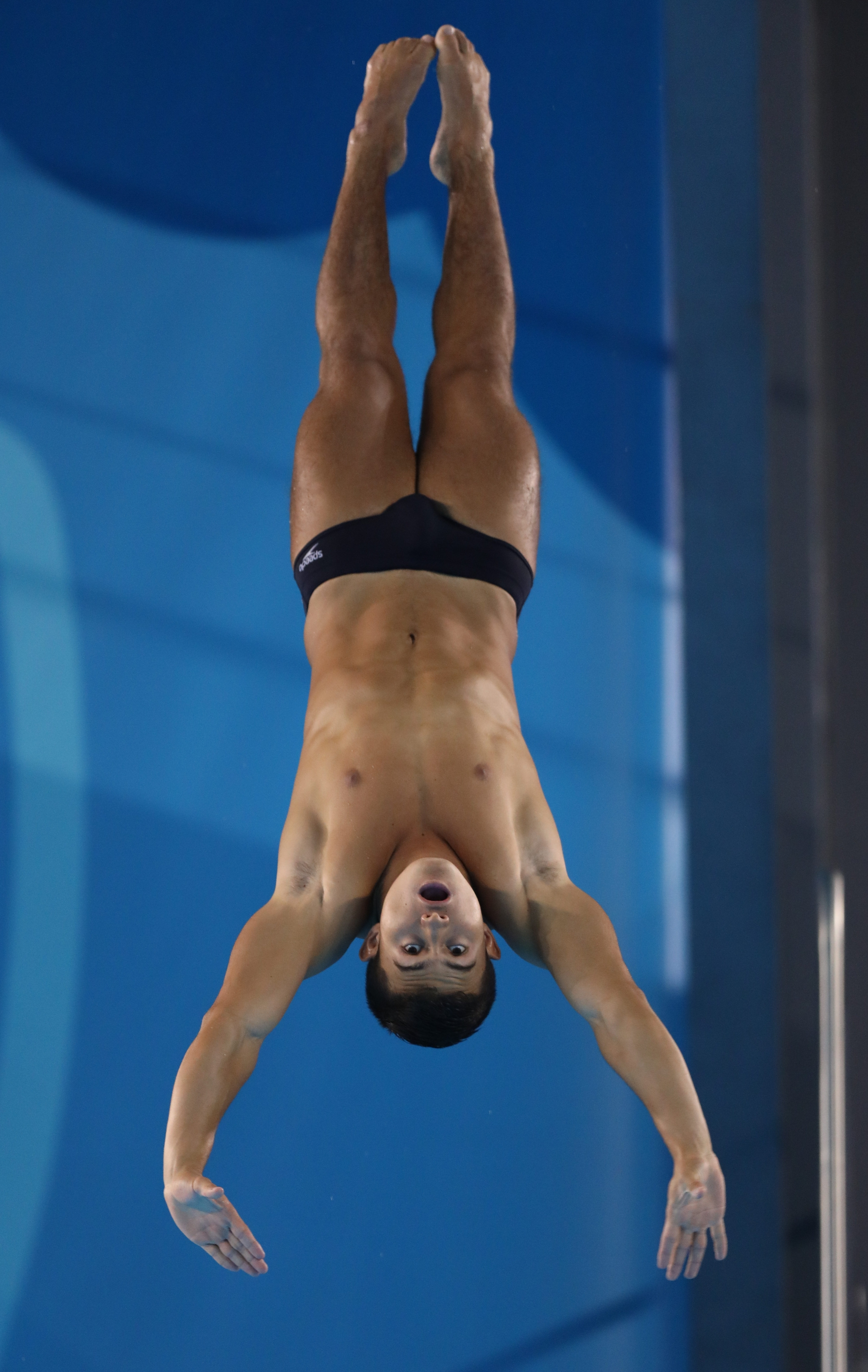
Daniel Restrepo

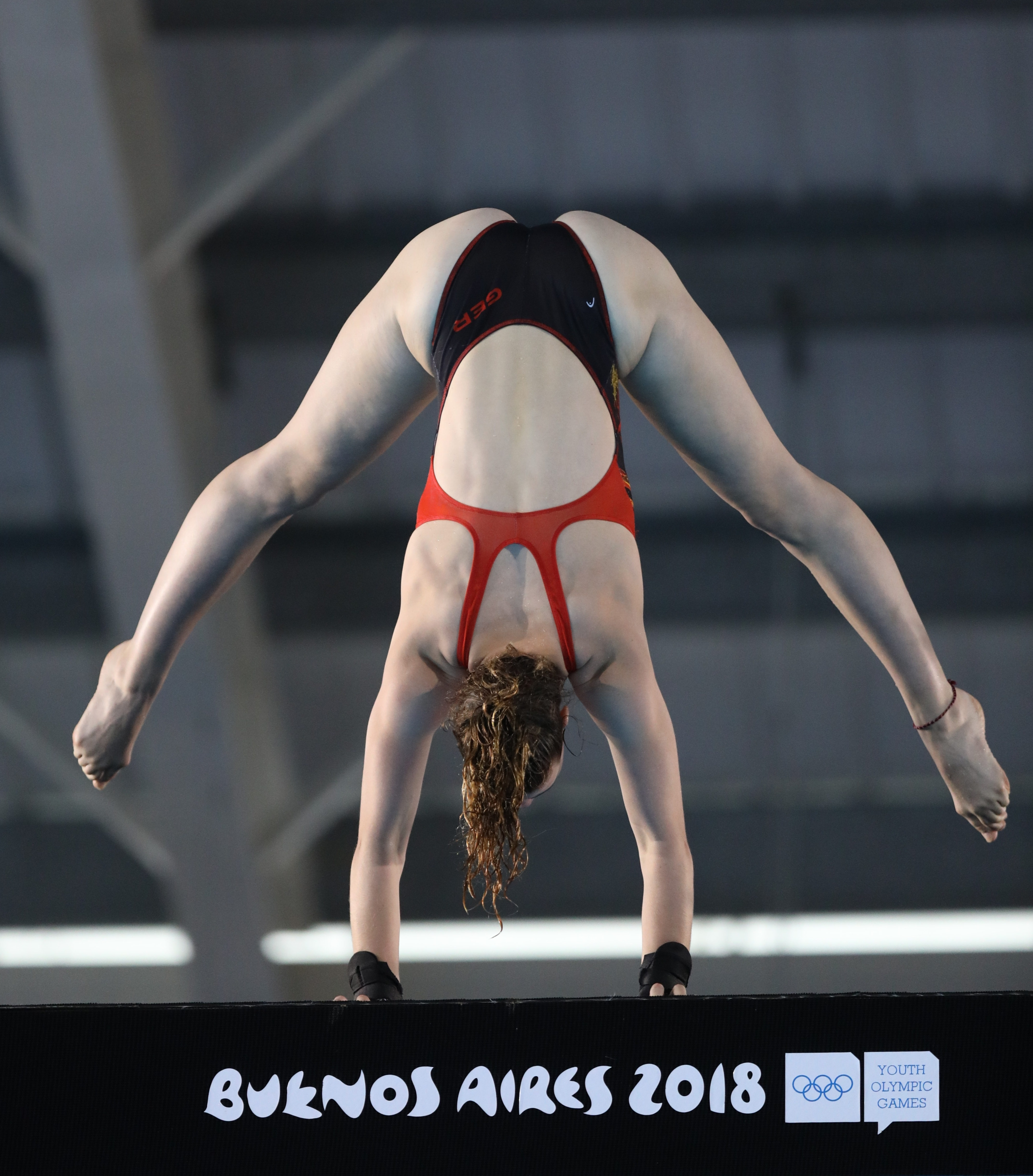
Elena Wassen

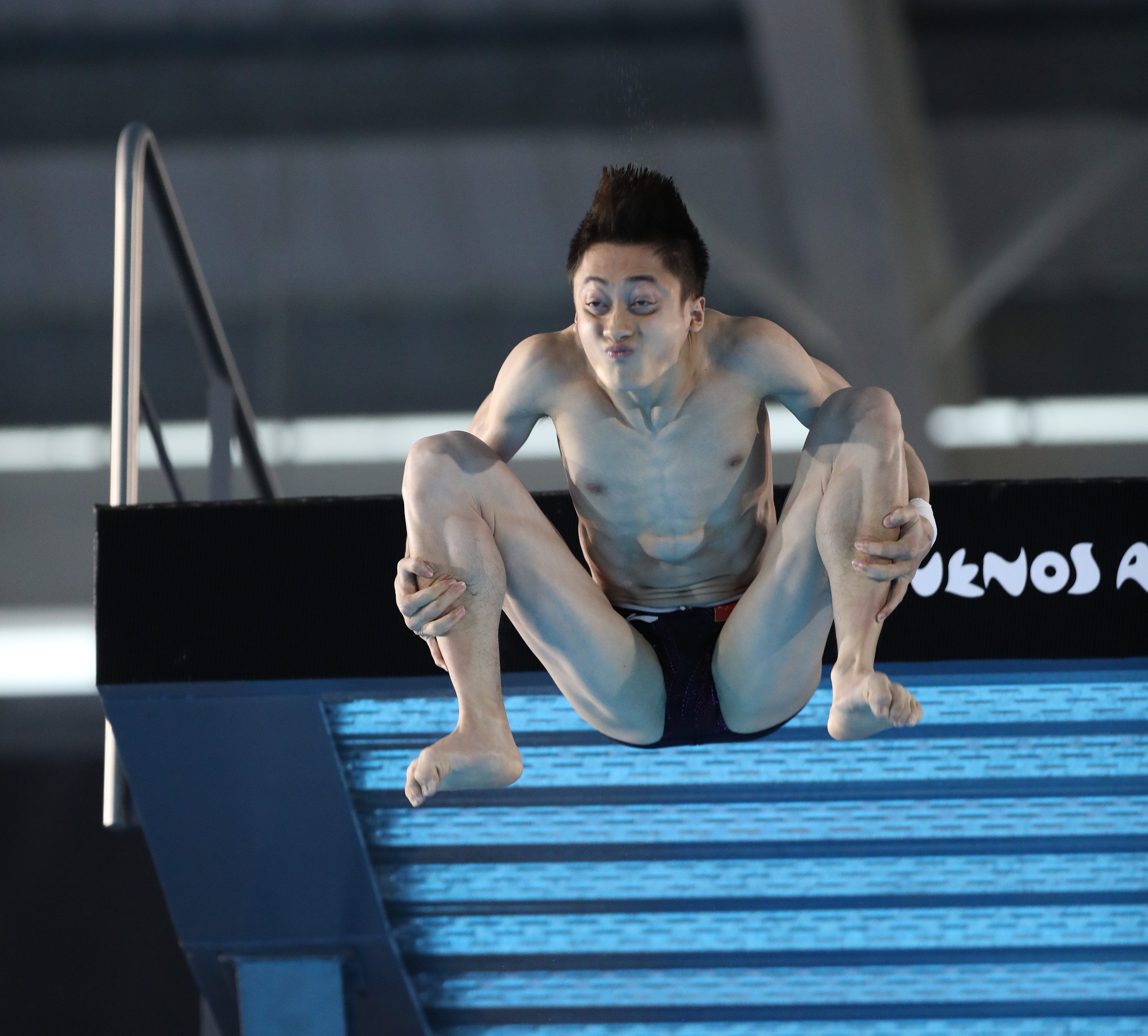
Lian Junjie

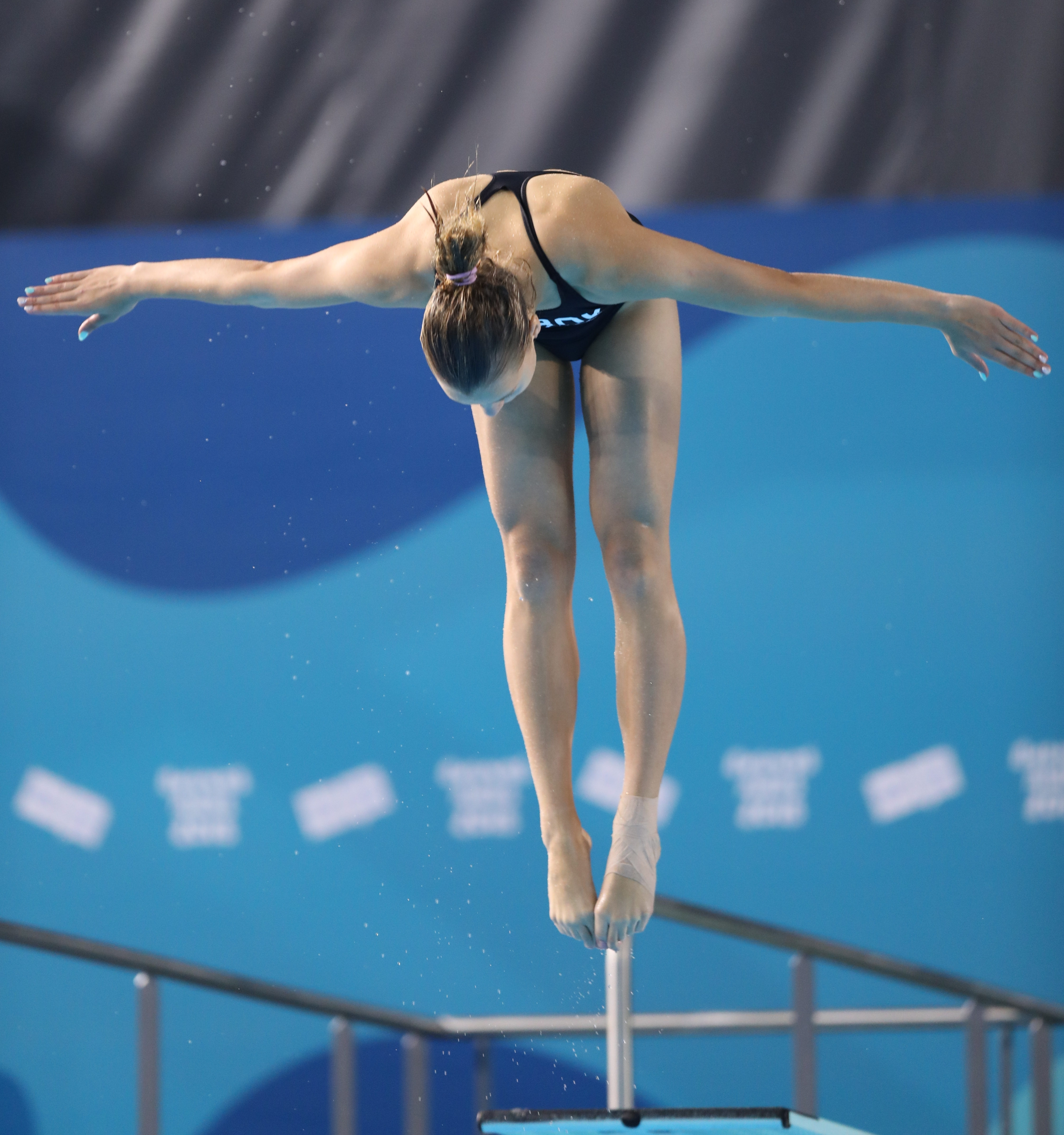
Sofiya Lyskun

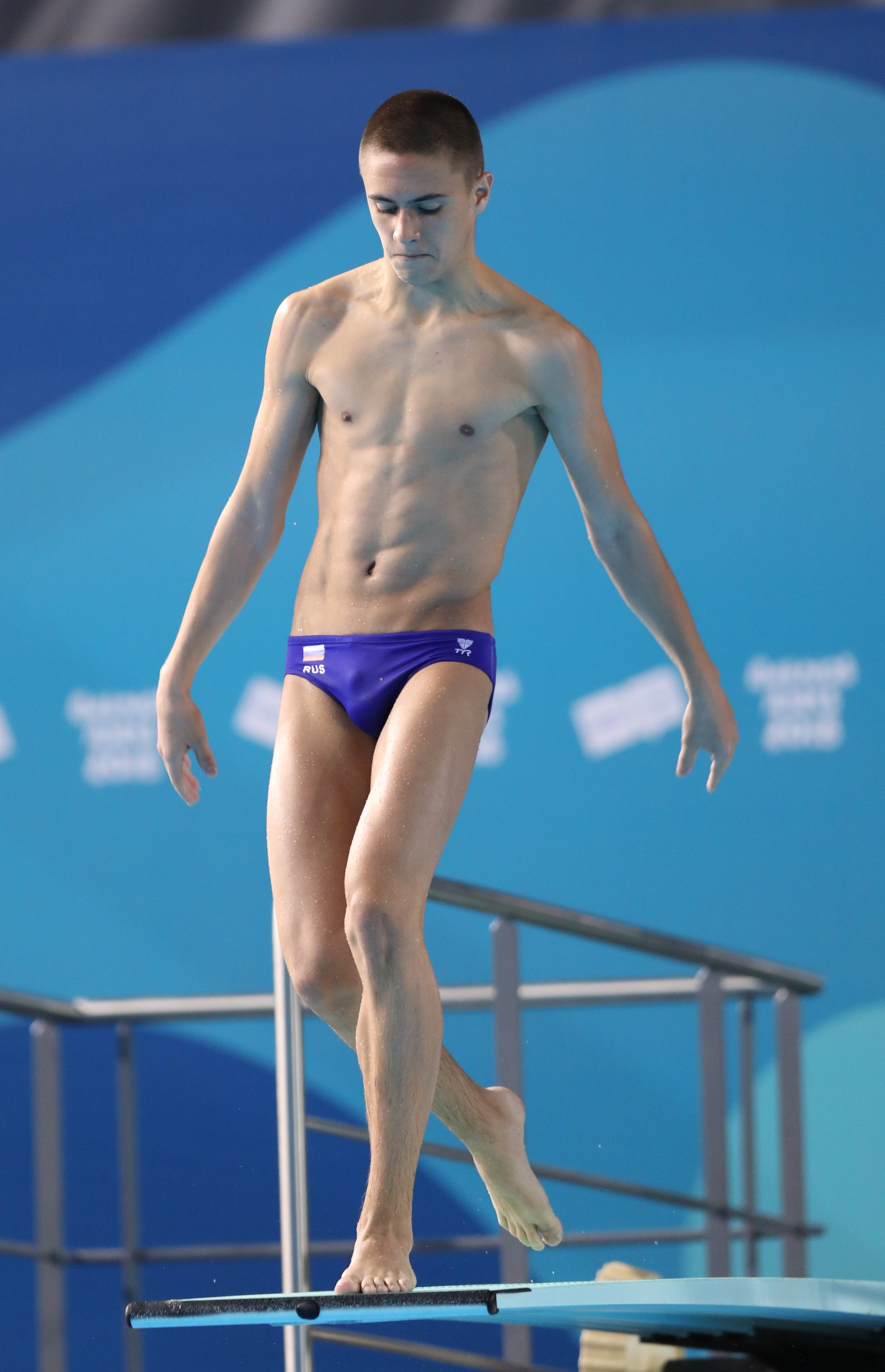
Ruslan Ternovoi
