= Diving at the 2012 Summer Olympics – Qualification =

== Qualifying system ==
For individual diving the top twelve from the 2011 World Championships, the five continental champions and the eighteen semifinalists at the 2012 Diving World Cup will qualify a quota spot. For the pairs events the top three from the world championships, the top four from the world cup and the hosts qualify.

== Qualification summary ==
Nation	Synchronized diving				Individual diving				Total	
Nation	Men's 3 m	Men's 10 m	Women's 3 m	Women's 10 m	Men's 3 m	Men's 10 m	Women's 3 m	Women's 10 m	Quotas	Athletes
Australia			X	X	1	2	2	2	9	10
Belarus						2			2	2
Brazil					1	1	1		3	3
Canada	X		X	X	2	2	2	2	11	9
China	X	X	X	X	2	2	2	2	12	12
Colombia					1	2			3	2
Cuba		X				2		1	4	3
France					2		2	1	5	5
Germany		X		X	2	2	2	2	10	8
Great Britain	X	X	X	X	2	2	2	2	12	12
Greece					1				1	1
Hungary							2		2	2
Italy			X		2	2	2	2	9	8
Japan								1	1	1
Malaysia	X		X	X	2	1	2	2	10	9
Mexico	X	X		X	2	2	2	2	11	10
Norway						1			1	1
North Korea						1		2	3	3
Russia	X	X			2	2	2	1	9	7
South Korea						1		1	2	2
Spain					1		1		2	2
Sweden						1	1		2	2
Ukraine	X	X	X	X	2	2	2	1	11	9
United States	X	X	X		2	2	2	2	11	11
Venezuela					2		1		3	3
Total: 25 NOCs	8	8	8	8	29	32	30	26	149	136

== Qualification timeline ==
Event	Date	Venue
2011 European Diving Championships	March 8 to March 13, 2011	(Italy) Turin
2011 World Aquatics Championships	July 16 to July 31, 2011	(China) Shanghai
Oceania Qualifying Events	August 19 to August 21, 2011	(New Zealand) Wellington
Asian Diving Cup	September 25 to September 27, 2011	(Malaysia) Kuala Lumpur
2011 Pan American Games	October 14 to October 30, 2011	(Mexico) Guadalajara
2012 FINA Diving World Cup	February 20 to February 26, 2012	(United Kingdom) London

- African qualification tournament was not held.

== Men's 3 m synchronized springboard ==
Competition	Vacancies	Qualifiers
FINA World Championships	3	China; Russia; Mexico
FINA Diving World Cup	4	Malaysia; Ukraine; Canada; United States
Host nation	1	Great Britain
TOTAL	8	

== Men's 10 m synchronized platform ==
Competition	Vacancies	Qualifiers
FINA World Championships	3	China; Germany; Ukraine
FINA Diving World Cup	4	Mexico; United States; Cuba; Russia
Host nation	1	Great Britain
TOTAL	8	

== Women's 3 m synchronized springboard ==
Competition	Vacancies	Qualifiers
FINA World Championships	3	China; Canada; Australia
FINA Diving World Cup	4	Italy; United States; Ukraine; Malaysia
Host nation	1	Great Britain
TOTAL	8	

== Women's 10 m synchronized platform ==
Competition	Vacancies	Qualifiers
FINA World Championships	3	China; Australia; Germany
FINA Diving World Cup	4	Canada; Ukraine; Malaysia; Mexico
Host nation	1	Great Britain
TOTAL	8	

== Men's 3 m springboard ==
For the individual events, any one diver can only gain 1 quota place per event for their NOC.

Competition	Vacancies	Qualifiers
FINA World Championships	12	China (He Chong); Russia (Ilya Zakharov); Russia (Evgeny Kuznetsov); China (Qin Kai); United States (Troy Dumais); Mexico (Yahel Castillo); France (Matthieu Rosset); Great Britain (Jack Laugher); Spain (Javier Illana García); Mexico (Julián Sánchez); Malaysia (Bryan Nickson); Ukraine (Oleksiy Pryhorov)
2011 European Diving Championships	1	Germany (Patrick Hausding)
Oceania Qualifying	1	~~Australia (Matthew Barnard)~~
Asia Diving Cup	1	Malaysia (Yeoh Ken Nee)
2011 Pan American Games	1	none allocated - Mexico already qualified 2 divers
FINA Diving World Cup	Up to 18 ^{1}	Australia (Ethan Warren); Ukraine (Illya Kvasha); Germany (Sascha Klein); Canada (Alexandre Despatie); United States (Chris Colwill); Italy (Michele Benedetti); Canada (Reuben Ross); ~~Japan (Sho Sakai)~~; ~~Japan (Ken Terauchi)~~; Great Britain (Chris Mears); Brazil (César Castro)
Additional	6 ^{1}	Venezuela (Edickson Contreras); Greece (Stefanos Paparounas); Italy (Tommaso Rinaldi); ~~Netherlands (Yorick de Bruijn)~~; Colombia (Sebastián Villa); Venezuela (Robert Paez); France (Damien Cely)
TOTAL	29	

== Men's 10 m platform ==
Competition	Vacancies	Qualifiers
FINA World Championships	12	China (Qiu Bo); United States (David Boudia); Germany (Sascha Klein); Russia (Victor Minibaev); Great Britain (Thomas Daley); United States (Nick McCrory); Mexico (Iván García); Ukraine (Oleksandr Bondar); Canada (Riley McCormick); China (Zhou Lüxin); Great Britain (Peter Waterfield); Ukraine (Kostyantyn Milyayev)
2011 European Diving Championships	1	not allocated - Sascha Klein qualified above
Oceania Qualifying	1	Australia (Matthew Barnard)
Asia Diving Cup	1	Malaysia (Bryan Nickson Lomas)
2011 Pan American Games	1	not allocated - Iván García qualified above
FINA Diving World Cup	Up to 18 ^{1}	Sweden (Christofer Eskilsson); Australia (Matthew Mitcham); Mexico (German Sánchez); Germany (Martin Wolfram); Cuba (José Guerra); Colombia (Sebastián Villa); Brazil (Hugo Parisi); Belarus (Vadim Kaptur); Russia (Gleb Galperin)
Additional	9 ^{1}	Italy (Francesco Dell'Uomo); Cuba (Jeinkler Aguirre); Italy (Andrea Chiarabini); South Korea (Park Ji-ho); Belarus (Timofei Hordeichik); Canada (Eric Sehn); Norway (Amund Gismervik); Colombia (Victor Ortega); ~~Sweden (Jesper Tolvers)~~; North Korea (Ri Hyon-ju)
TOTAL	32	

== Women's 3 m springboard ==
Competition	Vacancies	Qualifiers
FINA World Championships	12	China (Wu Minxia); China (He Zi); Canada (Jennifer Abel); United States (Christina Loukas); Australia (Sharleen Stratton); Mexico (Laura Sánchez); United States (Kelci Bryant); Ukraine (Anna Pysmenska); Italy (Tania Cagnotto); Russia (Nadezhda Bazhina); Germany (Uschi Freitag); Canada (Émilie Heymans)
2011 European Diving Championships	1	Sweden (Anna Lindberg)
Oceania Qualifying	1	Australia (Sherilyse Gowlett)
Asia Diving Cup	1	not allocated - China already have 2 quotas
2011 Pan American Games	1	not allocated - Laura Sánchez qualified above
FINA Diving World Cup	Up to 18 ^{1}	Germany (Nora Subschinski); Malaysia (Cheong Jun Heong); Great Britain (Rebecca Gallantree); Ukraine (Olena Fedorova); Mexico (Vianney Hernández); Venezuela (Joselyn Castillo)
Additional	10 ^{1}	Russia (Anastasia Pozdniakova); Great Britain (Hannah Starling); Italy (Francesca Dallape); Malaysia (Ng Yan Yee); France (Marion Farissier); Brazil (Juliana Veloso); France (Fanny Bouvet); ~~Netherlands (Inge Jansen)~~; Hungary (Flora Gondos); Hungary (Nora Barta); Spain (Jenifer Benitez)
TOTAL	30	

== Women's 10 m platform ==
Competition	Vacancies	Qualifiers
FINA World Championships	12	China (Chen Ruolin); China (Hu Yadan); Mexico (Paola Espinosa); Canada (Meaghan Benfeito); Malaysia (Pandelela Rinong); Ukraine (Iuliia Prokopchuk); Australia (Alex Croak); Canada (Roseline Filion); Great Britain (Tonia Couch); United States (Brittany Viola); Russia (Yulia Koltunova); Germany (Nora Subschinski)
2011 European Diving Championships	1	Italy (Noemi Batki)
Oceania Qualifying	1	Australia (Rachel Bugg)
Asia Diving Cup	1	not allocated - China already have 2 quotas
2011 Pan American Games	1	not allocated - Paola Espinosa has already qualified
FINA Diving World Cup	Up to 18 ^{1}	Germany (Christin Steuer); Mexico (Carolina Mendoza); Great Britain (Monique Gladding); Japan (Mai Nakagawa); Malaysia (Traisy Vivien Tukiet); North Korea (Kim Un-Hyang); United States (Haley Ishimatsu)
Additional	5 ^{1}	South Korea (Kim Su-ji); North Korea (Kim Jin-ok); Italy (Brenda Spaziani); France (Audrey Labeau); Cuba (Annia Rivera)
TOTAL	26	

^1 Only two athletes per nation can qualify, meaning if there are less than eighteen athletes the remaining quota spots will go to the additional pool.

- Athletes listed in brackets have not qualified, rather have earned a quota spot for their nation.
