= Diving at the 2009 World Aquatics Championships – Men's 3 metre springboard =

Following are the results of the Men's 3 metre springboard diving event at the 2009 World Aquatics Championships held in Rome, Italy, from July 17 to August 2, 2009.

== Results ==
Green denotes finalists

Rank	Diver	Nationality	Preliminary		Semifinal		Final	
Rank	Diver	Nationality	Points	Rank	Points	Rank	Points	Rank
1st place, gold medalist(s)	He Chong	China	480.90	3	483.30	2	505.20	1
2nd place, silver medalist(s)	Troy Dumais	United States	483.65	1	471.50	3	498.40	2
3rd place, bronze medalist(s)	Alexandre Despatie	Canada	483.55	2	485.05	1	490.30	3
4	Zhang Xinhua	China	472.60	4	471.00	4	487.75	4
5	César Castro	Brazil	437.45	9	456.55	6	466.90	5
6	Yahel Castillo	Mexico	463.95	5	452.05	8	459.90	6
7	Javier Illana	Spain	446.85	7	454.80	7	452.10	7
8	Chris Colwill	United States	437.10	10	429.20	11	451.70	8
9	Matthew Mitcham	Australia	434.35	11	467.15	5	431.30	9
10	Patrick Hausding	Germany	426.05	12	434.10	10	426.45	10
11	Reuben Ross	Canada	463.00	6	434.55	9	425.30	11
12	Michele Benedetti	Italy	445.45	8	422.00	12	415.70	12
13	Jorge Luis Pupo Carballo	Cuba	399.55	15	420.60	13		
14	Timo Klami	Norway	405.00	14	412.35	14		
15	Anton Zakharov	Ukraine	420.35	13	397.80	15		
16	Son Seongchel	South Korea	392.55	18	397.00	16		
17	Jonathan Ruvalcaba	Mexico	395.95	17	374.55	17		
18	Víctor Manuel Toranzo	Cuba	397.40	16	370.80	18		
19	Matthieu Rosset	France	386.00	19				
20	Damien Cely	France	385.50	20				
20	Jonathan Jörnfalk	Sweden	385.50	20				
22	Daniel Egana	Sweden	385.20	22				
23	Nicola Marconi	Italy	382.30	23				
24	Ramon de Meijer	Netherlands	371.95	24				
25	Constantin Blaha	Austria	361.10	25				
26	Charles Calvert	Great Britain	360.30	26				
27	Carlos Calvo	Spain	360.15	27				
28	Alexandros Manos	Greece	359.20	28				
29	Yeoh Ken Nee	Malaysia	358.80	29				
30	Ben Swain	Great Britain	356.05	30				
31	Pavlo Rozenberg	Germany	355.30	31				
32	Illya Kvasha	Ukraine	355.05	32				
33	Stefanos Paparounas	Greece	353.10	33				
34	Evgeny Kuznetsov	Russia	344.55	34				
35	Shota Korakhashvili	Georgia	344.00	35				
36	Andrzej Rzeszutek	Poland	341.10	36				
37	Grant Nel	Australia	332.70	37				
38	Sebastián Villa	Colombia	327.55	38				
39	Yuriy Kunakov	Russia	326.80	39				
40	Muhammad Fakhru Izzat	Malaysia	325.25	40				
41	Chola Chanturia	Georgia	323.95	41				
42	Ville Vahtola	Finland	314.80	42				
43	Ignas Barkauskas	Lithuania	314.65	43				
44	Sime Peric	Croatia	305.20	44				
45	Jorge Sanchez	Venezuela	304.15	45				
46	Yorick de Bruijn	Netherlands	292.05	46				
47	Akhmad Sukran Jamjami	Indonesia	290.70	47				
48	Argenis Alvarez	Dominican Republic	279.30	48				
49	Sergej Baziuk	Lithuania	279.30	49				
50	Foo Chuen Li	Hong Kong	279.30	50				
51	Farid Gurbanov	Azerbaijan	279.30	51				
