= Diving at the 2009 World Aquatics Championships – Men's synchronized 3 metre springboard =

The following are the results of the Men's Synchronized 3-metre Springboard Diving event at the 2009 World Aquatics Championships, held in Rome, Italy, from July 17 to August 2, 2009.

== Results ==
Green denotes finalists

Rank	Diver	Nationality	Preliminary		Final	
Rank	Diver	Nationality	Points	Rank	Points	Rank
1st place, gold medalist(s)	Qin Kai; Wang Feng	China	406.59	4	467.94	1
2nd place, silver medalist(s)	Troy Dumais; Kristian Ipsen	United States	420.57	1	445.59	2
3rd place, bronze medalist(s)	Alexandre Despatie; Reuben Ross	Canada	413.91	2	428.64	3
4	Nicola Marconi; Tommaso Marconi	Italy	405.18	5	428.55	4
5	Stephan Feck; Patrick Hausding	Germany	386.94	10	426.24	5
6	Yuriy Kunakov; Dmitri Sautin	Russia	395.94	7	416.22	6
7	Nick Robinson-Baker; Ben Swain	Great Britain	408.84	3	413.46	7
8	José Guerra; Jorge Betancourt	Cuba	395.16	8	413.19	8
9	Damien Cely; Matthieu Rosset	France	404.46	6	396.09	9
10	Alejandro Islas; Jonathan Ruvalcaba	Mexico	385.50	11	394.65	10
11	Roslan Rossharisham; Yeoh Ken Nee	Malaysia	394.47	9	388.77	11
12	Carlos Calvo; Javier Illana	Spain	378.75	12	384.93	12
13	Daniel Egana; Jonathan Jörnfalk	Sweden	373.71	13		
14	Grant Nel; Matthew Mitcham	Australia	367.17	14		
15	Alexandros Manos; Stefanos Paparounas	Greece	354.51	15		
16	Yorick de Bruijn; Ramon de Meijer	Netherlands	336.60	16		
17	Chola Chanturia; Shota Korakhashvili	Georgia	335.58	17		
18	Oh Yi-Taek; Son Seongchel	South Korea	334.20	18		
19	Ignas Barkauskas; Sergej Baziuk	Lithuania	327.42	19		
20	Illya Kvasha; Oleksiy Prygorov	Ukraine	292.38	20		
