= Diving at the 2012 European Aquatics Championships – Men's 3 m springboard =

The men's 3 m springboard competition of the diving events at the 2012 European Aquatics Championships was held on May 17.

== Medalists ==
Gold	Silver	Bronze
Matthieu Rosset; France	Patrick Hausding; Germany	Ilya Zakharov; Russia

== Results ==
The preliminary round was held at 11:00 local time. The final was held at 17:30.

Green denotes finalists

Rank	Diver	Nationality	Preliminary		Final	
Rank	Diver	Nationality	Points	Rank	Points	Rank
1st place, gold medalist(s)	Matthieu Rosset	France	457.65	3	504.00	1
2nd place, silver medalist(s)	Patrick Hausding	Germany	465.60	2	502.75	2
3rd place, bronze medalist(s)	Ilya Zakharov	Russia	404.65	6	493.80	3
4	Evgeny Kuznetsov	Russia	481.70	1	492.45	4
5	Illya Kvasha	Ukraine	432.00	4	486.50	5
6	Jack Laugher	Great Britain	391.65	10	475.75	6
7	Sascha Klein	Germany	390.70	11	439.95	7
8	Chris Mears	Great Britain	399.35	8	417.45	8
9	Javier Illana	Spain	417.10	5	412.95	9
10	Stefanos Paparounas	Greece	382.60	12	408.55	10
11	Yorick de Bruijn	Netherlands	404.60	7	389.10	11
12	Damien Cely	France	393.50	9	388.10	12
13	Tommaso Rinaldi	Italy	377.70	13		
14	Andrzej Rzeszutek	Poland	372.55	14		
15	Oleksiy Pryhorov	Ukraine	370.00	15		
16	Constantin Blaha	Austria	364.60	16		
17	Ramon de Meijer	Netherlands	353.00	17		
18	Jesper Tolvers	Sweden	341.80	18		
19	Espen Valheim	Norway	337.40	19		
20	Andrei Pawluk	Belarus	336.35	20		
21	Youheni Karaliou	Belarus	314.90	21		
22	Fabian Brandl	Austria	301.70	22		
23	Andrea Aloisio	Switzerland	291.25	23		
24	Artur Cislo	Poland	282.10	24		
25	Otto Lehtonen	Finland	254.75	25		
26	Tamás Kelemen	Hungary	249.05	26		
27	Michele Benedetti	Italy	247.55	27		
