= Diving at the 2009 World Aquatics Championships – Men's 1 metre springboard =

Men's 1 metre springboard at the Diving at the 2009 World Aquatics Championships
- Date: 17 July
- Competitors: 35 from 26 nations
- Winning points: 449.00

Medalists
gold medal	Qin Kai	China
silver medal	Zhang Xinhua	China
bronze medal	Matthew Mitcham	Australia

Following are the results of the Men's 1 metre springboard diving event at the 2009 World Aquatics Championships held in Rome, Italy, from July 17 to August 2, 2009.

== Results ==
Green denotes finalists

Rank	Diver	Nationality	Preliminary		Final	
Rank	Diver	Nationality	Points	Rank	Points	Rank
1st place, gold medalist(s)	Qin Kai	China	412.00	3	449.00	1
2nd place, silver medalist(s)	Zhang Xinhua	China	416.10	1	445.90	2
3rd place, bronze medalist(s)	Matthew Mitcham	Australia	369.05	9	440.20	3
4	Peter Waterfield	Great Britain	365.80	10	432.60	4
5	Illya Kvasha	Ukraine	378.50	4	413.10	5
6	Javier Illana	Spain	371.40	6	395.55	6
7	Eric Sehn	Canada	369.80	8	391.80	7
8	Andrzej Rzeszutek	Poland	360.70	12	369.25	8
9	Chris Colwill	United States	413.35	2	350.30	9
10	Ilya Zakharov	Russia	370.95	7	322.75	10
11	Pavlo Rozenberg	Germany	372.95	5	320.65	11
12	Carlos Calvo	Spain	364.55	11	307.60	12
13	Nicola Marconi	Italy	352.40	13		
14	Constantin Blaha	Austria	350.40	14		
15	Sebastián Villa	Colombia	342.60	15		
16	Terry Horner	United States	336.15	16		
17	Christopher Sacchin	Italy	334.00	17		
18	César Castro	Brazil	329.95	18		
19	Grant Nel	Australia	327.65	19		
20	Timo Klami	Norway	323.10	20		
21	Jorge Luis Pupo Carballo	Cuba	321.75	21		
22	Evgeny Kuznetsov	Russia	319.20	22		
23	Mathieu Rosset	France	314.20	23		
24	Julián Sánchez	Mexico	313.95	24		
25	Víctor Manuel Toranzo	Cuba	311.90	25		
26	Ignas Barkauskas	Lithuania	311.50	26		
27	Sime Peric	Croatia	311.40	27		
28	Yahel Castillo	Mexico	295.80	28		
29	Son Seongchel	South Korea	290.45	29		
30	Timofei Hordeichik	Belarus	275.15	30		
31	Jorge Sanchez	Venezuela	270.80	31		
32	Ville Vahtola	Finland	259.30	32		
33	Muhammad Fakhru Izzat	Malaysia	250.65	33		
34	Michel Annas	Germany	231.25	34		
35	Argenis Alvarez	Dominican Republic	194.45	35		
