= Diving at the 2012 European Aquatics Championships – Men's 1 m springboard =

The men's 1 m springboard competition of the diving events at the 2012 European Aquatics Championships was held on May 16.

== Medalists ==
Gold	Silver	Bronze
Illya Kvasha; Ukraine	Evgeny Kuznetsov; Russia	Matthieu Rosset; France

== Results ==
The preliminary round was held at 11:00 local time. The final was held at 17:30.

Green denotes finalists

Rank	Diver	Nationality	Preliminary		Final	
Rank	Diver	Nationality	Points	Rank	Points	Rank
1st place, gold medalist(s)	Illya Kvasha	Ukraine	408.05	1	430.50	1
2nd place, silver medalist(s)	Evgeny Kuznetsov	Russia	378.10	5	412.65	2
3rd place, bronze medalist(s)	Matthieu Rosset	France	391.05	2	403.95	3
4	Javier Illana	Spain	367.50	8	395.30	4
5	Pavlo Rozenberg	Germany	361.45	10	382.45	5
6	Yuriy Kunakov	Russia	377.50	6	379.20	6
7	Oleksiy Pryhorov	Ukraine	380.70	4	368.85	7
8	Andrzej Rzeszutek	Poland	365.15	9	357.05	8
9	Giovanni Tocci	Italy	368.40	7	334.50	9
10	Youheni Karaliou	Belarus	385.55	3	308.85	10
11	Oliver Homuth	Germany	355.15	11	303.75	11
12	Yorick de Bruijn	Netherlands	349.70	12	295.00	12
13	Damien Cely	France	345.10	13		
14	Stefanos Paparounas	Greece	329.55	14		
15	Amund Gismervik	Norway	322.10	15		
16	Espen Bergslien	Norway	318.60	16		
17	Tommaso Rinaldi	Italy	314.55	17		
18	Constantin Blaha	Austria	309.15	18		
19	Artur Cislo	Poland	295.10	19		
20	Andrei Pawluk	Belarus	288.60	20		
21	Andrea Aloisio	Switzerland	281.45	21		
22	Otto Lehtonen	Finland	274.90	22		
23	Tamás Kelemen	Hungary	273.95	23		
24	Botond Bota	Hungary	257.25	24		
25	Ramon de Meijer	Netherlands	251.80	25		
26	Fabian Brandl	Austria	248.35	26		
