= 2015 European Diving Championships – Men's 3 metre springboard =

== Medalists ==
Gold	Silver	Bronze
Matthieu Rosset; France	Evgeny Kuznetsov; Russia	Ilya Zakharov; Russia

== Results ==
Green denotes finalists

Rank	Diver	Nationality	Preliminary		Final	
Rank	Diver	Nationality	Points	Rank	Points	Rank
1st place, gold medalist(s)	Matthieu Rosset	France	457,95	2	476,70	1
2nd place, silver medalist(s)	Evgeny Kuznetsov	Russia	452,70	3	467,60	2
3rd place, bronze medalist(s)	Ilya Zakharov	Russia	422,70	4	451,85	3
4	Illya Kvasha	Ukraine	421,80	5	439,75	4
5	Patrick Hausding	Germany	465,60	1	432,45	5
6	Oleg Kolodiy	Ukraine	379,95	7	413,95	6
7	Stephan Feck	Germany	385,30	6	412,95	7
8	Yorick de Bruijn	Netherlands	378,50	8	403,75	8
9	Jesper Tolvers	Sweden	362,65	10	402,65	9
10	Sztefanosz Paparunasz	Greece	358,75	11	385,80	10
11	Freddie Woodward	United Kingdom	375,45	9	363,10	11
12	Andrei Pavluk	Belarus	353,15	12	351,20	12
13	Guillaume Dutoit	Switzerland	351,60	13		
14	Constantin Blaha	Austria	351,00	14		
15	James Denny	United Kingdom	350,90	15		
16	Antoine Catel	France	346,45	16		
17	Nicolás García	Spain	336,10	17		
18	Vinko Paradzik	Sweden	330,55	18		
19	Tommaso Rinaldi	Italy	329,85	19		
20	Espen Bergslien	Norway	320,85	20		
21	Héctor García	Spain	317,55	21		
22	Jouni Kallunki	Finland	312,90	22		
23	Andrzej Rzeszutek	Poland	298,30	23		
24	Michele Benedetti	Italy	298,05	24		
25	Kacper Lesiak	Poland	295,90	25		
26	Yauheni Karaliou	Belarus	283,65	26		
27	Daniel Jensen	Norway	277,80	27		
28	Bóta Botond	Hungary	240,70	28		
