= Diving at the 2012 European Aquatics Championships – Men's 3 m synchro springboard =

The men's 3 m springboard synchro competition of the diving events at the 2012 European Aquatics Championships was held on May 18.

== Medalists ==
Gold	Silver	Bronze
Evgeny Kuznetsov; Ilya Zakharov; Russia	Patrick Hausding; Stephan Feck; Germany	Oleksiy Pryhorov; Illya Kvasha; Ukraine

== Results ==
The preliminary round was held at 14:00 local time. The final was held at 19:30.

Green denotes finalists

Rank	Diver	Nationality	Preliminary		Final	
Rank	Diver	Nationality	Points	Rank	Points	Rank
1st place, gold medalist(s)	Evgeny Kuznetsov; Ilya Zakharov	Russia	441.30	1	445.92	1
2nd place, silver medalist(s)	Patrick Hausding; Stephan Feck	Germany	411.63	3	433.68	2
3rd place, bronze medalist(s)	Oleksiy Pryhorov; Illya Kvasha	Ukraine	429.60	2	432.48	3
4	Damien Cely; Matthieu Rosset	France	410.73	4	404.43	4
5	Chris Mears; Nicholas Robinson-Baker	Great Britain	391.05	5	390.84	5
6	Andrei Pawluk; Youheni Karaliou	Belarus	355.95	8	356.28	6
7	Nicola Marconi; Tommaso Marconi	Italy	370.44	7	329.16	7
8	Ramon de Meijer; Yorick de Bruijn	Netherlands	372.30	6	308.79	8
9	Andrzej Rzeszutek; Artur Cislo	Poland	351.87	9		
