= Diving at the 2016 European Aquatics Championships – Men's 3 m springboard =

Men's 3 m springboard at the 2016 European Aquatics Championships
- Dates: 12 May
- Competitors: 28 from 16 nations
- Winning points: 497.90

Medalists
gold medal	Evgeny Kuznetsov	Russia
silver medal	Jack Laugher	Great Britain
bronze medal	Illya Kvasha	Ukraine

The Men's 3 m springboard competition of the 2016 European Aquatics Championships was held on 12 May 2016.

== Results ==
The preliminary round was held at 11:30. The final was held at 19:30.

Green denotes finalists

Rank	Diver	Nationality	Preliminary		Final	
Rank	Diver	Nationality	Points	Rank	Points	Rank
1st place, gold medalist(s)	Evgeny Kuznetsov	Russia	405.15	6	497.90	1
2nd place, silver medalist(s)	Jack Laugher	Great Britain	495.05	1	473.60	2
3rd place, bronze medalist(s)	Illya Kvasha	Ukraine	400.70	8	463.85	3
4	Ilya Zakharov	Russia	433.20	2	457.75	4
5	Patrick Hausding	Germany	432.25	3	433.05	5
6	Giovanni Tocci	Italy	424.25	5	432.30	6
7	Matthieu Rosset	France	430.50	4	419.90	7
8	Oliver Dingley	Ireland	404.35	7	414.50	8
9	Martin Wolfram	Germany	394.55	9	384.50	9
10	Nicolás García	Spain	388.85	10	379.35	10
11	Oleh Kolodiy	Ukraine	386.70	11	364.15	11
12	Alberto Arévalo	Spain	373.90	12	311.75	12
13	Yorick de Bruijn	Netherlands	373.45	13		
14	Michele Benedetti	Italy	372.65	14		
15	Guillaume Dutoit	Switzerland	370.35	15		
16	Yury Naurozau	Belarus	358.40	16		
17	Constantin Blaha	Austria	356.40	17		
18	Jonathan Suckow	Switzerland	352.80	18		
19	Chola Chanturia	Georgia	349.10	19		
20	Vinko Paradzik	Sweden	344.80	20		
21	Frederick Woodward	Great Britain	341.05	21		
22	Joey van Etten	Netherlands	337.35	22		
23	Alexis Jandard	France	331.20	23		
24	Kacper Lesiak	Poland	324.90	24		
25	Yauheni Karaliou	Belarus	310.15	25		
26	Jouni Kallunki	Finland	295.15	26		
27	Fabian Brandl	Austria	288.55	27		
28	Aleksandre Gujabidze	Georgia	249.90	28		
