= 2015 European Diving Championships – Men's 1 metre springboard =

== Medalists ==
Gold	Silver	Bronze
Matthieu Rosset; France	Evgenii Novoselov; Russia	Oleg Kolodiy; Ukraine

== Results ==
Green denotes finalists

Rank	Diver	Nationality	Preliminary		Final	
Rank	Diver	Nationality	Points	Rank	Points	Rank
1st place, gold medalist(s)	Matthieu Rosset	France	404,75	1	433,80	1
2nd place, silver medalist(s)	Evgenii Novoselov	Russia	368,75	4	396,05	2
3rd place, bronze medalist(s)	Oleg Kolodiy	Ukraine	373,45	3	391,10	3
4	Illya Kvasha	Ukraine	386,55	2	390,15	4
5	Giovanni Tocci	Italy	342,00	10	385,60	5
6	Evgeny Kuznetsov	Russia	350,25	8	381,75	6
7	Constantin Blaha	Austria	351,35	7	377,55	7
8	Andrzej Rzeszutek	Poland	338,85	11	365,10	8
9	Oliver Homuth	Germany	350,15	9	353,40	9
10	Espen Bergslien	Norway	329,90	12	335,45	10
11	Andrea Chiarabini	Italy	356,85	6	327,90	11
12	Freddie Woodward	United Kingdom	367,45	5	300,50	12
13	Daniel Jensen	Norway	318,80	13		
14	Nicolás García	Spain	314,00	14		
15	Benjamin Auffret	France	311,15	15		
16	Jack Haslam	United Kingdom	305,10	16		
17	Joey van Etten	Netherlands	303,50	17		
18	Kacper Lesiak	Poland	302,70	18		
19	Héctor García	Spain	295,60	19		
20	Guillaume Dutoit	Switzerland	280,45	20		
21	Bóta Botond	Hungary	264,20	21		
22	Jouni Kallunki	Finland	263,90	22		
23	Andrei Pavluk	Belarus	259,45	23		
24	Vinko Paradzik	Sweden	253,00	24		
25	Timo Barthel	Germany	DNS	25		
