= 2017 European Diving Championships – Men's 3 metre synchro springboard =

== Results ==
| Rank | Diver | Nationality | Final | |
| Rank | Diver | Nationality | Points | Rank |
|---|---|---|---|---|
| 1st place, gold medalist(s) | Ilia Zakharov; Evgeny Kuznetsov | Russia | 427.71 | 1 |
| 2nd place, silver medalist(s) | Illya Kvasha; Oleg Kolodiy | Ukraine | 426.96 | 2 |
| 3rd place, bronze medalist(s) | Freddie Woodward; James Heatly | Great Britain | 395.61 | 3 |
| 4 | Patrick Hausding; Stephan Feck | Germany | 393.39 | 4 |
| 5 | Lorenzo Marsaglia; Gabriele Auber | Italy | 374.88 | 5 |
| 6 | Guillaume Dutoit; Simon Rieckhoff | Switzerland | 359.22 | 6 |
| 7 | Kacper Lesiak; Andrzej Rzeszutek | Poland | 357.66 | 7 |
| 8 | Nicolás García Boissier; Hector García Boissier | Spain | 353.82 | 8 |
| 9 | Fabian Brandl; Constantin Blaha | Austria | 335.04 | 9 |
| 10 | Antoine Catel; Matthieu Rosset | France | 333.18 | 10 |
| 11 | Yauheni Karaliou; Mikita Tkachou | Belarus | 321.69 | 11 |
| 12 | Sandro Melikidze; Tornike Onikashvili | Georgia | 303.42 | 12 |
