= Diving at the 2014 Commonwealth Games – Men's 1 metre springboard =

Men's 1 metre springboard at the 2014 Commonwealth Games
- Venue: Strathclyde Country Park
- Date: July 30
- Competitors: 14 from 8 nations
- Winning points: 449.90

Medalists
| gold medal | Jack Laugher | England |
| silver medal | Matthew Mitcham | Australia |
| bronze medal | Grant Nel | Australia |

The men's 1 metre springboard was part of the Diving at the 2014 Commonwealth Games program. The competition was held on 30 July 2014 at Royal Commonwealth Pool in Edinburgh.

== Schedule ==
All times are British Summer Time (UTC+1)

| Date | Time | Round |
|---|---|---|
| 30 July 2014 | 10:05 | Preliminaries |
| 30 July 2014 | 18:05 | Finals |

== Format ==
The 14 divers will dive compete in a preliminary round, with each driver making six dives. The 12 best divers will advance to the final round during the evening session, where all previous scores will be cleared.

== Results ==
Green denotes finalists

| Rank | Diver | Preliminary | | Final | |
| Rank | Diver | Points | Rank | Points | Rank |
|---|---|---|---|---|---|
| Gold medal | Jack Laugher (ENG) | 435.30 | 1 | 449.90 | 1 |
| Silver medal | Matthew Mitcham (AUS) | 383.65 | 2 | 404.85 | 2 |
| Bronze medal | Grant Nel (AUS) | 352.60 | 5 | 403.40 | 3 |
| 4 | Chris Mears (ENG) | 383.40 | 3 | 396.20 | 4 |
| 5 | Yona Knight-Wisdom (JAM) | 333.10 | 8 | 391.20 | 5 |
| 6 | Ooi Tze Liang (MAS) | 333.80 | 7 | 387.80 | 6 |
| 7 | Liam Stone (NZL) | 343.35 | 6 | 382.10 | 7 |
| 8 | Riley McCormick (CAN) | 326.20 | 9 | 374.10 | 8 |
| 9 | James Heatly (SCO) | 317.65 | 10 | 345.60 | 9 |
| 10 | Freddie Woodward (ENG) | 365.45 | 4 | 340.05 | 10 |
| 11 | Cody Yano (CAN) | 312.00 | 12 | 327.90 | 11 |
| 12 | François Imbeau-Dulac (CAN) | 313.20 | 11 | 326.70 | 12 |
| 13 | Ramananda Kongbrailatpam (IND) | 294.95 | 13 | | |
| 14 | Ahmad Amsyar Azman (MAS) | 294.45 | 14 | | |
