= Diving at the 2014 European Aquatics Championships – Men's 1 m springboard =

Men's 1 m springboard at the Diving at the 2014 European Aquatics Championships
- Dates: 19 August
- Competitors: 26 from 15 nations
- Winning points: 428.65

Medalists
gold medal	Patrick Hausding	Germany
silver medal	Evgeny Kuznetsov	Russia
bronze medal	Matthieu Rosset	France

The Men's 1 m springboard competition of the 2014 European Aquatics Championships was held on 19 August.

== Results ==
The preliminary round was held at 10:00 and the final at 14:00.

Green denotes finalists

Rank	Diver	Nationality	Preliminary		Final	
Rank	Diver	Nationality	Points	Rank	Points	Rank
1st place, gold medalist(s)	Patrick Hausding	Germany	388.60	2	428.65	1
2nd place, silver medalist(s)	Evgeny Kuznetsov	Russia	398.75	1	422.40	2
3rd place, bronze medalist(s)	Matthieu Rosset	France	373.35	5	420.10	3
4	Evgenii Novoselov	Russia	371.90	7	409.35	4
5	Oliver Homuth	Germany	372.85	6	394.05	5
6	Giovanni Tocci	Italy	387.25	3	391.40	6
7	Jack Laugher	Great Britain	344.30	11	386.50	7
8	Constantin Blaha	Austria	370.15	8	383.05	8
9	Andrzej Rzeszutek	Poland	353.55	10	382.20	9
10	Oleg Kolodiy	Ukraine	375.10	4	377.55	10
11	Kacper Lesiak	Poland	337.25	12	350.70	11
12	James Denny	Great Britain	355.10	9	329.15	12
13	Vinko Paradzik	Sweden	336.20	13		
14	Alberto Arévalo	Spain	320.95	14		
15	Oleksandr Gorshkovozov	Ukraine	319.45	15		
16	Stefanos Paparounas	Greece	317.90	16		
17	Benjamin Auffret	France	314.20	17		
18	Fabian Brandl	Austria	305.10	18		
19	Jesper Tolvers	Sweden	287.90	19		
20	Yorick de Bruijn	Netherlands	276.05	20		
21	Botond Bóta	Hungary	275.40	21		
22	Johannes van Etten	Netherlands	269.25	22		
23	Espen Bergslien	Norway	265.30	23		
24	Jouni Kallunki	Finland	261.20	24		
25	Michail Fafalis	Greece	252.60	25		
26	Espen Valheim	Norway	231.45	26		
