= Diving at the 2008 Summer Olympics – Men's 3 metre springboard =

Men's 3 metre springboard at the Games of the XXIX Olympiad
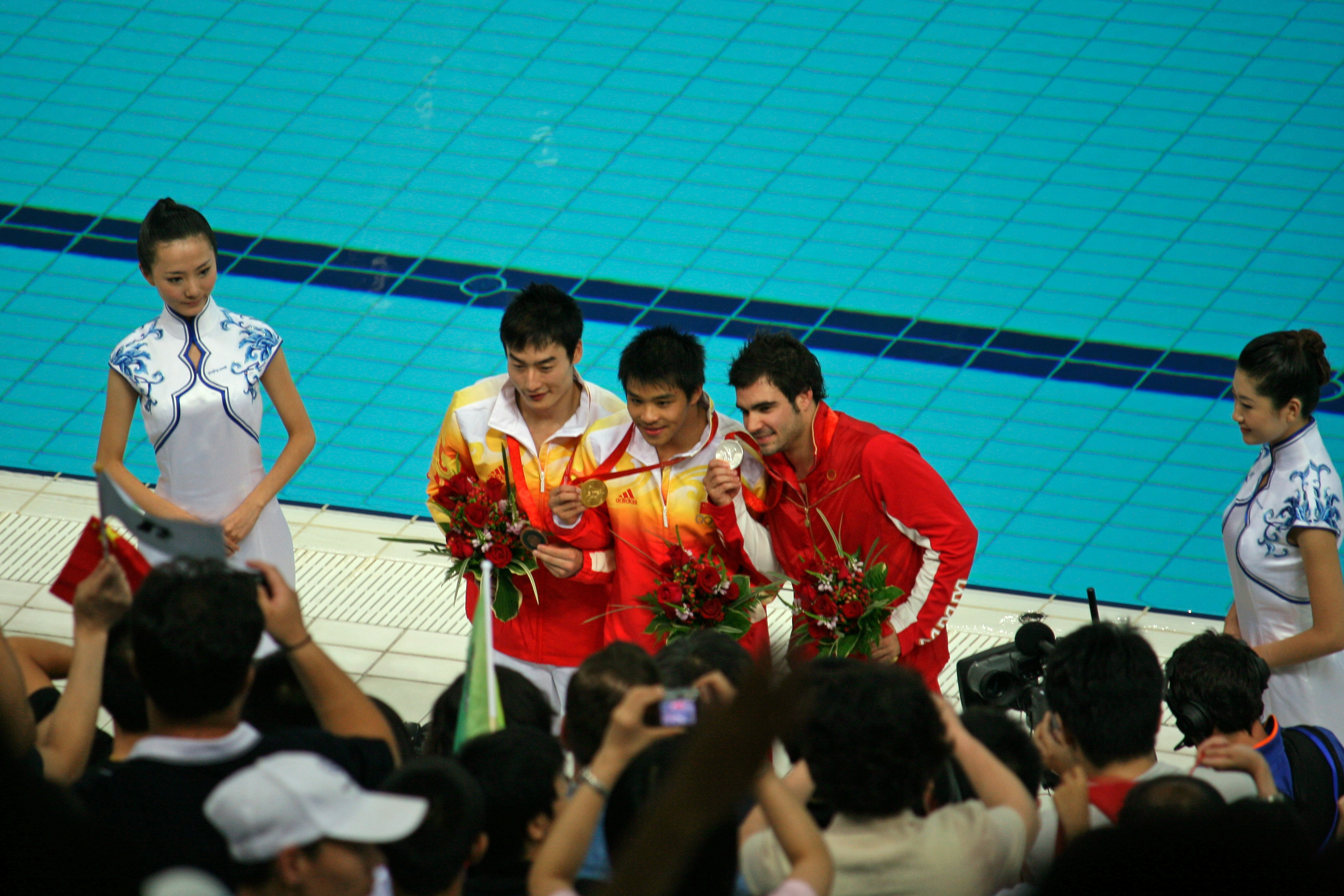
- Venue: Beijing National Aquatics Center
- Date: 18–19 August

Medalists
1st place, gold medalist(s)		He Chong	China
2nd place, silver medalist(s)		Alexandre Despatie	Canada
3rd place, bronze medalist(s)		Qin Kai	China

The men's 3 metre springboard competition at the Beijing 2008 Summer Olympics was held from August 18 to August 19, at the Beijing National Aquatics Center. It was an individual diving competition, with dives performed from a flexible springboard three metres above the surface of the water.

The individual diving competitions all consist of three rounds. In the first, the 29 divers each perform six dives. The top 18 divers advance to the semifinals. Each diver again performs six dives, and the top 12 divers from among those dives advance to the finals. Preliminary scores are ignored at this point, as only the semifinal scores are considered in advancement. In the final round, the divers perform a final set of six dives, with the scores from those dives (and only those dives) used to determine final ranking.

Seven judges evaluate each dive, giving the diver a score between 0 and 10 with increments of 0.5; scores below 6.0 or above 9.5 are rare. The highest and lowest score from each judge are dropped. The remaining five scores are summed, multiplied by 0.6, and multiplied by the degree of difficulty of the dive to give the total score for the dive. Scores from each dive in the round are summed to give the round score.

== Results ==
Rank	Diver	Country	Preliminary		Semifinal		Final
Rank	Diver	Country	Points	Rank	Points	Rank	Points
1st place, gold medalist(s)	He Chong	China	515.50	1	547.25	1	572.90
2nd place, silver medalist(s)	Alexandre Despatie	Canada	453.60	9	518.75	2	536.65
3rd place, bronze medalist(s)	Qin Kai	China	502.95	2	508.50	3	530.10
4	Dmitry Sautin	Russia	474.85	4	476.35	8	512.65
5	Pavlo Rozenberg	Germany	431.65	16	454.40	12	485.60
6	Troy Dumais	United States	448.40	12	463.15	10	472.50
7	Yahel Castillo	Mexico	480.65	3	504.55	4	462.10
8	Patrick Hausding	Germany	451.65	11	481.5	5	462.05
9	Robert Newbery	Australia	465.15	6	460.35	11	461.05
10	Juan Urán	Colombia	443.05	14	468.90	9	454.60
11	Ken Terauchi	Japan	452.80	10	478.25	7	442.50
12	Chris Colwill	United States	464.75	7	480.95	6	425.90
13	Joona Puhakka	Finland	469.45	5	451.95	13	Did not advance
14	Nicola Marconi	Italy	430.90	18	444.55	14	Did not advance
15	Illya Kvasha	Ukraine	461.65	8	439.55	15	Did not advance
16	Matthew Mitcham	Australia	439.85	15	427.45	16	Did not advance
17	Aleksandr Dobroskok	Russia	431.15	17	412.00	17	Did not advance
18	Reuben Ross	Canada	446.15	13	395.85	18	Did not advance
19	Jorge Betancourt	Cuba	428.25	19	did not advance		
20	Javier Illana	Spain	423.90	20	did not advance		
21	Ramón Fumadó	Venezuela	419.05	21	did not advance		
22	Constantin Blaha	Austria	407.55	22	did not advance		
23	Yuriy Shlyakhov	Ukraine	405.05	23	did not advance		
24	César Castro	Brazil	400.60	24	did not advance		
25	Sergei Kuchmasov	Belarus	399.40	25	did not advance		
26	Ben Swain	Great Britain	390.30	26	did not advance		
27	Jorge Luis Pupo	Cuba	388.70	27	did not advance		
28	Tommaso Marconi	Italy	360.15	28	did not advance		
29	Son Seong-cheol	South Korea	353.35	29	did not advance		
