= Diving at the 2011 Pan American Games – Men's 3 metre springboard =

Men's 3 metre springboard at the 2011 Pan American Games
- Venue: Scotiabank Aquatics Center
- Dates: October 27
- Competitors: 16 from 10 nations

Medalists
Gold medal	Yahel Castillo	Mexico
Silver medal	Julián Sánchez	Mexico
Bronze medal	César Castro	Brazil

The men's 3 metre springboard competition of the diving events at the 2011 Pan American Games will be held on October 27 at the Scotiabank Aquatics Center. The defending Pan American Games champion is Alexandre Despatie of Canada, who will not compete due to an injury. The winner of the competition (if not already qualified) will advance to compete at the 2012 Summer Olympics to be held in London, Great Britain.

The individual diving competitions all consist of two rounds. In the first, the divers each perform five dives. All divers advance to the advance to the finals. In the final round, the divers perform a final set of five dives, with the scores from those dives (and only those dives) used to determine final ranking.

Seven judges evaluate each dive, giving the diver a score between 0 and 10 with increments of 0.5; scores below 7.0 or above 9.5 are rare. The two highest and two lowest scores from each judge are dropped. The remaining three scores are summed, and multiplied by the degree of difficulty of the dive to give the total score for the dive. Scores from each dive in the round are summed to give the round score.

== Schedule ==
Date	Time	Round
October 27, 2011	10:00	Preliminaries
October 27, 2011	19:30	Finals

== Results ==
Green denotes finalists

Rank	Diver	Nationality	Preliminary		Final	
Rank	Diver	Nationality	Points	Rank	Points	Rank
1st place, gold medalist(s)	Yahel Castillo	Mexico	510.70	1	529.25	1
2nd place, silver medalist(s)	Julián Sánchez	Mexico	474.40	2	480.65	2
3rd place, bronze medalist(s)	César Castro	Brazil	435.95	6	462.15	3
4	Sebastián Villa	Colombia	449.05	3	458.70	4
5	François Imbeau-Dulac	Canada	422.80	8	443.05	5
6	Kristian Ipsen	United States	434.50	7	429.20	6
7	Edickson Contreras	Venezuela	379.80	10	426.85	7
8	Reuben Ross	Canada	437.05	5	419.50	8
9	Jorge Luis Pupo	Cuba	360.25	12	417.75	9
10	Drew Livingston	United States	442.45	4	391.70	10
11	Rene Hernandez	Cuba	383.30	9	353.40	11
12	Robert Paez	Venezuela	374.90	11	313.80	12
13	Rafael Quintero	Puerto Rico	326.35	13	–	–
14	Argenis Alvarez	Dominican Republic	273.10	14	–	–
15	Donato Neglia	Chile	256.15	15	–	–
	Diego Carquin	Chile		DNF		
