= Diving at the 2012 Summer Olympics – Men's 3 metre springboard =

Men's 3 metre springboard at the Games of the XXX Olympiad
- Venue: Aquatics Centre
- Date: 6–7 August
- Competitors: 29 from 17 nations
- Winning points: 555.90

Medalists
1st place, gold medalist(s)		Ilya Zakharov	Russia
2nd place, silver medalist(s)		Qin Kai	China
3rd place, bronze medalist(s)		He Chong	China

The men's 3 metre springboard diving competition at the 2012 Olympic Games in London was held on 6 and 7 August at the Aquatics Centre within the Olympic Park.

Ilya Zakharov from Russia won the gold medal. China's Qin Kai took silver and He Chong won bronze.

== Format ==
The competition was held in three rounds:

- Preliminary round: All 29 divers perform six dives; the top 18 divers advance to the semi-final.
- Semi-final: The 18 divers perform six dives; the scores of the qualifications are erased and the top 12 divers advance to the final.
- Final: The 12 divers perform six dives; the semi-final scores are erased and the top three divers win the gold, silver and bronze medals accordingly.

== Schedule ==
All times are British Summer Time (UTC+1)

Date	Time	Round
Monday 6 August 2012	19:00	Preliminary
Tuesday 7 August 2012	10:00; 19:00	Semifinal; Final

== Results ==
Rank	Diver	Nation	Preliminary		Semifinal		Final						
Rank	Diver	Nation	Points	Rank	Points	Rank	Dive 1	Dive 2	Dive 3	Dive 4	Dive 5	Dive 6	Points
1st place, gold medalist(s)	Ilya Zakharov	Russia	507.65	1	505.60	2	85.00	91.00	89.25	86.70	99.45	104.50	555.90
2nd place, silver medalist(s)	Qin Kai	China	451.60	11	500.35	3	81.00	86.70	96.25	91.80	96.90	89.10	541.75
3rd place, bronze medalist(s)	He Chong	China	500.90	2	510.15	1	72.00	81.60	89.25	85.00	98.80	97.50	524.15
4	Patrick Hausding	Germany	477.15	4	485.55	6	76.50	75.95	87.75	76.50	94.50	94.35	505.55
5	Troy Dumais	United States	486.60	3	490.55	5	83.70	84.15	76.50	81.60	88.40	88.40	498.35
6	Yahel Castillo	Mexico	475.25	5	499.65	4	86.70	85.00	95.00	89.25	72.00	64.75	492.70
7	Ethan Warren	Australia	441.50	15	456.85	11	72.00	68.20	91.20	86.70	89.25	81.60	488.95
8	Illya Kvasha	Ukraine	470.25	6	478.60	7	78.20	68.40	79.20	82.25	67.50	86.70	462.25
9	Chris Mears	Great Britain	436.05	18	461.00	9	72.00	58.50	74.25	78.20	56.10	100.70	439.75
10	Yeoh Ken Nee	Malaysia	452.60	10	441.65	12	79.05	78.20	49.50	79.20	76.50	75.00	437.45
11	Alexandre Despatie	Canada	458.55	9	472.80	8	72.00	80.85	81.00	83.30	74.10	22.10	413.35
12	Javier Illana	Spain	460.35	8	458.05	10	70.50	86.70	55.10	42.00	35.70	81.60	371.60
13	François Imbeau-Dulac	Canada	449.30	12	440.20	13	did not advance						
14	Evgeny Kuznetsov	Russia	440.95	16	437.70	14	did not advance						
15	Matthieu Rosset	France	445.15	13	422.50	15	did not advance						
16	Oleksiy Pryhorov	Ukraine	439.80	17	414.15	16	did not advance						
17	César Castro	Brazil	441.90	14	388.40	17	did not advance						
18	Chris Colwill	United States	461.35	7	339.80	18	did not advance						
19	Huang Qiang	Malaysia	433.85	19	did not advance								
20	Michele Benedetti	Italy	433.05	20	did not advance								
21	Sebastián Villa	Colombia	414.90	21	did not advance								
22	Damien Cely	France	413.30	22	did not advance								
23	Daniel Islas Arroyo	Mexico	410.60	23	did not advance								
24	Tommaso Rinaldi	Italy	400.00	24	did not advance								
25	Robert Páez	Venezuela	382.60	25	did not advance								
26	Stefanos Paparounas	Greece	366.10	26	did not advance								
27	Jack Laugher	Great Britain	330.00	27	did not advance								
28	Edickson Contreras	Venezuela	301.45	28	did not advance								
–	Stephan Feck	Germany	did not finish*										

*Stephan Feck, competing in his first Olympics, received a 0.0 on his second dive after he slipped on the board and landed on his back in the water. He returned for his third dive but did not perform his fourth, fifth or sixth, thereby removing himself from the competition.
