= Diving at the 2010 Commonwealth Games – Men's synchronised 3 metre springboard =

The Men's 3 m synchro springboard at the 2010 Commonwealth Games was held on 12 October 2010.

== Results ==
Rank	Nation	Dives						Total
Rank	Nation	1	2	3	4	5	6	Total
1st place, gold medalist(s)	Canada; Alexandre Despatie, Reuben Ross	56.40	53.40	79.20	75.33	75.24	90.78	430.35
2nd place, silver medalist(s)	Australia; Matthew Mitcham, Ethan Warren	52.80	53.40	77.40	73.47	88.20	779.20	424.47
3rd place, bronze medalist(s)	Malaysia; Bryan Lomas, Ken Yeoh	51.60	49.80	67.89	84.66	76.23	74.46	404.64
4	England; Nick Robinson-Baker, Chris Mears	52.20	47.40	77.40	66.96	70.29	86.70	400.95
5	Australia; Scott Robertson, Grant Nel	52.80	54.00	75.60	79.05	53.04	80.58	395.07
6	Malaysia; Muhammad Zain, Ahmad Azman	51.60	40.20	69.30	74.70	75.48	77.19	388.47
7	England; Oliver Dingley, Jack Laugher	53.40	48.00	67.50	50.40	65.10	64.80	349.20
