= Sergei Kuchmasov =

Belarusian diver (born 1981)

Personal information
- Full name: Sergei Vasilievich Kuchmasov
- Nationality: Belarus
- Born: 3 August 1981 (age 44) Penza, Russian SFSR
- Height: 1.70 m (5 ft 7 in)
- Weight: 72 kg (159 lb)

Sport
- Sport: Diving
- Event: Springboard
- Club: Dynamo Minsk (BLR)
- Coached by: Sergei Lomanovski (BLR)

Sergei Vasilievich Kuchmasov (Russian: Серге́й Васильевич Кучмасов; born 3 August 1981 in Penza, Russian SFSR) is a Belarusian springboard diver. Kuchmasov made his official debut at the 2004 Summer Olympics in Athens, representing Belarus. He placed twenty-fifth in the men's springboard event, by forty-two hundredths of a point ahead of Ukraine's Yuriy Shlyakhov, with a total score of 377.61.

At the 2008 Summer Olympics in Beijing, Kuchmasov repeated his overall position in the preliminary rounds of the 3 m individual springboard event. He scored a total of 399.60 points in six successive attempts, just one point closely behind Brazil's César Castro.
