= Diving at the 2004 Summer Olympics – Men's 3 metre springboard =

Men's 3 metre springboard at the Games of the XXVIII Olympiad

Medalists
1st place, gold medalist(s)		Peng Bo	China
2nd place, silver medalist(s)		Alexandre Despatie	Canada
3rd place, bronze medalist(s)		Dmitri Sautin	Russia

The men's 3 metre springboard was one of eight diving events included in the Diving at the 2004 Summer Olympics programme.

The competition was split into three phases:

Preliminary round
23 August — Each diver performed a front dive, a back dive, a reverse dive, an inward dive, a twisting dive and a sixth free-choice dive from one of these groups. There were no limitations in degree of difficulty. The 18 divers with the highest total score advanced to the semi-final.
Semi-final
24 August — Each diver performed a front dive, a back dive, a reverse dive, an inward dive and a twisting dive. The overall difficulty degree was limited to 9.5. The 12 divers with the highest combined score from the semi-final and preliminary dives advanced to the final.
Final
24 August — Each diver performed a front dive, a back dive, a reverse dive, an inward dive, a twisting dive and a sixth free-choice dive from one of these groups. There were no limitations in difficulty degree. The final ranking was determined by the combined score from the final and semi-final dives.

== Results ==
Rank	Diver	Country	Preliminary		Semifinal				Final		
Rank	Diver	Country	Points	Rank	Points	Rank	Total	Rank	Points	Rank	Total
1st place, gold medalist(s)	Peng Bo	China	495.45	2	256.17	2	751.62	2	531.21	1	787.38
2nd place, silver medalist(s)	Alexandre Despatie	Canada	517.59	1	254.73	3	772.32	1	501.24	3	755.97
3rd place, bronze medalist(s)	Dmitri Sautin	Russia	450.06	6	256.38	1	706.44	4	496.89	4	753.27
4	Wang Feng	China	444.96	7	240.42	5	685.38	7	510.30	2	750.72
5	Fernando Platas	Mexico	434.70	8	232.02	7	666.72	8	472.23	5	704.25
6	Troy Dumais	United States	452.76	5	239.91	6	692.67	6	461.55	7	701.46
7	Alexander Dobroskok	Russia	489.75	3	228.09	10	717.84	3	469.20	6	697.29
8	Ken Terauchi	Japan	456.15	4	245.64	4	701.79	5	444.36	8	690.00
9	César Castro	Brazil	432.45	9	230.28	8	662.73	9	432.69	9	662.97
10	Rommel Pacheco	Mexico	408.75	15	221.85	11	630.60	12	420.84	10	642.69
11	Dmytro Lysenko	Ukraine	419.16	11	219.57	12	638.73	11	410.07	11	629.64
12	Robert Newbery	Australia	429.09	10	228.60	9	657.69	10	391.74	12	620.34
13	Philippe Comtois	Canada	418.32	12	210.90	15	629.22	13	did not advance		
14	Joona Puhakka	Finland	414.69	13	209.91	16	624.60	14	did not advance		
15	Tony Ally	Great Britain	401.52	16	215.61	14	617.13	15	did not advance		
16	Steven Barnett	Australia	397.71	17	217.05	13	614.76	16	did not advance		
17	Ramon Fumado	Venezuela	410.97	14	194.82	18	605.79	17	did not advance		
18	Mark Shipman	Great Britain	396.90	18	202.98	17	599.88	18	did not advance		
19	Javier Illana	Spain	385.80	19	did not advance						
20	Nicola Marconi	Italy	384.63	20	did not advance						
21	Jorge Betancourt	Cuba	382.56	21	did not advance						
22	Erick Fornaris	Cuba	380.07	22	did not advance						
23	Andreas Wels	Germany	378.93	23	did not advance						
24	Tommaso Marconi	Italy	378.72	24	did not advance						
25	Sergei Kuchmasov	Belarus	377.61	25	did not advance						
26	Yuriy Shlyakhov	Ukraine	377.19	26	did not advance						
27	Tobias Schellenberg	Germany	371.85	27	did not advance						
28	Nikolaos Siranidis	Greece	363.75	28	did not advance						
29	Jukka Piekkanen	Finland	359.22	29	did not advance						
30	Aliaksandr Varlamau	Belarus	357.09	30	did not advance						
31	Juan Urán	Colombia	344.40	31	did not advance						
32	Justin Wilcock	United States	225.87	32	did not advance						

== Sources ==
- "Diving Results". Athens 2004 Summer Olympics. Yahoo!.
