= Diving at the 2014 Commonwealth Games – Men's synchronised 3 metre springboard =

Men's synchronised 3 metre springboard at the 2014 Commonwealth Games
- Venue: Strathclyde Country Park
- Date: August 1
- Competitors: 12 from 5 nations
- Winning points: 431.91

Medalists
gold medal	Jack Laugher; Chris Mears	England
silver medal	Matthew Mitcham; Grant Nel	Australia
bronze medal	Nicholas Robinson-Baker; Freddie Woodward	England

The men's synchronised 3 metre springboard was part of the Diving at the 2014 Commonwealth Games program. The competition was held on 1 August 2014 at Royal Commonwealth Pool in Edinburgh.

== Schedule ==
All times are British Summer Time (UTC+1)

Date	Time	Round
1 August 2014	11:24	Finals

== Format ==
A single round was held, with each team making six dives. Eleven judges scored each dive: three for each diver, and five for synchronisation. Only the middle score counted for each diver, with the middle three counting for synchronisation. These five scores were averaged, multiplied by 3, and multiplied by the dive's degree of difficulty to give a total dive score. The scores for each of the six dives were summed to give a final score.

== Results ==
Rank	Nation	Dives						Total
Rank	Nation	1	2	3	4	5	6	Total
Gold medal	England; Jack Laugher; Chris Mears	51.60	53.40	80.58	85.68	83.16	77.52	431.91
Silver medal	Australia; Matthew Mitcham; Grant Nel	52.20	51.00	70.20	66.30	79.80	83.64	403.14
Bronze medal	England; Nicholas Robinson-Baker; Freddie Woodward	47.40	51.60	70.20	69.75	69.36	56.10	364.41
4	Malaysia; Ahmad Amsyar Azman; Ooi Tze Liang	45.60	48.60	68.82	65.28	55.65	69.36	353.31
5	Canada; Maxim Bouchard; Riley McCormick	51.60	44.40	70.68	71.10	60.30	47.70	345.78
6	New Zealand; Li Feng Yang; Liam Stone	45.60	46.20	67.50	58.50	66.60	52.02	336.42
