= Diving at the 2011 Pan American Games – Men's 10 metre platform =

Men's 10 metre platform at the 2011 Pan American Games
- Venue: Scotiabank Aquatics Center
- Dates: October 29
- Competitors: 11 from 7 nations

Medalists
Gold medal	Iván García	Mexico
Silver medal	Rommel Pacheco	Mexico
Bronze medal	Sebastián Villa	Colombia

The men's 10 metre platform competition of the diving events at the 2011 Pan American Games will be held on October 29 at the Scotiabank Aquatics Center. The defending Pan American Games champion is José Guerra of Cuba. The winner of the competition (if not already qualified) will advance to compete at the 2012 Summer Olympics to be held in London, Great Britain.

The individual diving competitions all consist of two rounds. In the first, the divers each perform five dives. All divers advance to the finals. In the final round, the divers perform a final set of five dives, with the scores from those dives (and only those dives) used to determine final ranking.

Seven judges evaluate each dive, giving the diver a score between 0 and 10 with increments of 0.5; scores below 7.0 or above 9.5 are rare. The two highest and two lowest scores from each judge are dropped. The remaining three scores are summed, and multiplied by the degree of difficulty of the dive to give the total score for the dive. Scores from each dive in the round are summed to give the round score.

== Schedule ==
Date	Time	Round
October 29, 2011	10:00	Preliminaries
October 29, 2011	21:00	Finals

== Results ==
Green denotes finalists

Rank	Diver	Nationality	Preliminary		Final	
Rank	Diver	Nationality	Points	Rank	Points	Rank
1st place, gold medalist(s)	Iván García	Mexico	456.40	3	553.80	1
2nd place, silver medalist(s)	Rommel Pacheco	Mexico	519.80	1	508.20	2
3rd place, bronze medalist(s)	Sebastián Villa	Colombia	408.50	8	471.05	3
4	Jeinkler Aguirre	Cuba	414.95	7	458.10	4
5	Thomas Finchum	United States	472.00	2	451.95	5
6	Hugo Parisi	Brazil	430.50	5	451.45	6
7	Eric Sehn	Canada	368.30	9	413.50	7
8	Víctor Ortega	Colombia	423.85	6	395.30	8
9	Enrique Rojas	Venezuela	340.70	11	364.50	9
10	Kevin Geyson	Canada	431.75	4	330.00	10
11	Rui Marinho	Brazil	358.45	10	315.85	11
