= Dan Laak =

American Olympic diver and Diving coach

Dan Laak is the head dive coach of the University of Georgia (UGA) men's and women's diving teams. He has also coached internationally as part of the U.S. Olympic dive team coaching staff.

== Diving career ==
Laak dove collegiately at the University of Wisconsin–La Crosse under head diving coach, Barry Schockmel, and graduated in 1982 with a bachelor's degree in recreation administration. He earned five All-America and Honorable Mention honors. In October 2003 Laak was inducted into the Wisconsin-LaCrosse Athletic Wall of Fame.

== Coaching and professional career ==
The 2013-2014 season marks Laak's 27th year as a coach for UGA. During his coaching tenure at UGA, he has been named National Coach of the Year twice (2006, 2008) and SEC Dive Coach of the Year three times (2001, 2005, 2006). He has also served twice as a coach for the United States Olympic dive team (2008, 2012).

In 2008 Laak served as a United States dive team coach during the 2008 Summer Olympics in Beijing, China and National Team Coach at the USA Grand Prix. That same year Laak was named the NCAA diving national coach of the year after coaching UGA men's diver Chris Colwill to a first-place finish on the 1-meter springboard and two second-place finishes on the 3-meter and platform events and UGA women's diver Hannah Moore to a fourth-place finish on 3-meter spring-board. For the 2009 FINA Diving World Series, Laak served as a National Team Coach/Team Leader.

Laak judged the World University Games in Yugoslavia in 1987 and Spain in 1999. He served as a diving coach at the 1990 U.S. Olympic Festival and as a judge at the 1993 U.S. Olympic Festival. From 1997 to 2000, Laak was the Chairman of the NCAA Diving Rules Committee.

== See also ==
- Georgia Bulldogs
- Diving
