= Justin Wilcock =

American diver

Personal information
- Born: June 8, 1979 (age 47) Smithfield, Utah, U.S.

Sport
- Country: United States
- Sport: Diving

Justin Wilcock (born June 8, 1979) is an American diver. He competed at the 2004 Summer Olympics in Athens, in the men's 3 metre springboard. Wilcock was born in Smithfield, Utah.
