= Diving at the 2020 European Aquatics Championships – Men's 3 m springboard =

Men's 3 m springboard at the 2020 European Aquatics Championships
- Venue: Danube Arena
- Dates: 14 May 2021
- Competitors: 32 from 19 nations

Medalists
gold medal	Evgeny Kuznetsov	Russia
silver medal	Nikita Shleikher	Russia
bronze medal	Martin Wolfram	Germany

The Men's 3 m springboard competition of the 2020 European Aquatics Championships was held on 14 May 2021.

== Results ==
The preliminary round was started at 12:00. The final was held at 20:25.

Green denotes finalists

Rank	Diver	Nationality	Preliminary		Final	
Rank	Diver	Nationality	Points	Rank	Points	Rank
1st place, gold medalist(s)	Evgeny Kuznetsov	Russia	443.70	1	525.20	1
2nd place, silver medalist(s)	Nikita Shleikher	Russia	417.10	2	505.80	2
3rd place, bronze medalist(s)	Martin Wolfram	Germany	410.85	6	484.65	3
4	James Heatly	Great Britain	416.30	3	464.60	4
5	Oleh Kolodiy	Ukraine	393.90	10	446.95	5
6	Jack Laugher	Great Britain	414.00	4	423.10	6
7	Guillaume Dutoit	Switzerland	387.25	12	410.15	7
8	Andrzej Rzeszutek	Poland	390.60	11	405.90	8
9	Patrick Hausding	Germany	413.30	5	390.05	9
10	Lorenzo Marsaglia	Italy	405.40	7	389.55	10
11	Giovanni Tocci	Italy	405.25	8	379.15	11
12	Alberto Arévalo	Spain	395.00	9	349.40	12
13	Nicolás García	Spain	383.55	13	did not advance	
14	Kacper Lesiak	Poland	378.00	14	did not advance	
15	Jonathan Suckow	Switzerland	368.80	15	did not advance	
16	Oliver Dingley	Ireland	367.35	16	did not advance	
17	Alexis Jandard	France	366.15	17	did not advance	
18	Alexander Hart	Austria	359.95	18	did not advance	
19	Nikolaj Schaller	Austria	355.95	19	did not advance	
20	Botond Bóta	Hungary	344.90	20	did not advance	
21	Max Burman	Sweden	344.40	21	did not advance	
22	Yury Naurozau	Belarus	340.70	22	did not advance	
23	Theofilos Afthinos	Greece	331.95	23	did not advance	
24	Athanasios Tsirikos	Greece	326.05	24	did not advance	
25	Juho Junttila	Finland	315.10	25	did not advance	
26	Jules Bouyer	France	313.25	26	did not advance	
27	Bram Meulendijks	Netherlands	312.75	27	did not advance	
28	Stanislav Oliferchyk	Ukraine	299.45	28	did not advance	
29	Sandro Melikidze	Georgia	296.35	29	did not advance	
30	Chola Chanturia	Georgia	276.45	30	did not advance	
31	David Ekdahl	Sweden	264.50	31	did not advance	
32	Orhan Candan	Turkey	226.00	32	did not advance	
