= Jevon Tarantino =

American diver

Personal information
- Full name: Jevon Tarantino
- Born: January 30, 1984 (age 42) Boynton Beach, Florida
- Home town: Boca Raton, Florida
- Height: 5 ft 8 in (1.73 m)

Sport
- Country: United States
- Event(s): 3m, 3m synchro
- College team: University of Tennessee
- Club: Fort Lauderdale Diving Team
- Partner: Chris Colwill
- Former partner: Phil Jones

Jevon Tarantino (born January 30, 1984) is an American springboard diver. He is a member of the Fort Lauderdale Diving Team and is coached by David Burgering. He was a member of the US National Team for seven years(2001–2008). He represented the United States at the 2008 Olympic Games. He is a five-time Junior National Champion, a four-time Senior National Champion, the 2004 SEC Champion (University of Tennessee), the 2004 NCAA Champion (University of Tennessee), and a member of the 2005 and 2006 World Championship teams.
