= Ignas Barkauskas =

Lithuanian diver (born 1988)

Personal information
- Born: 6 November 1988 (age 37) Vilnius, Lithuanian SSR, Soviet Union

Sport
- Sport: Diving

Ignas Barkauskas (born 6 November 1988) is a Lithuanian diver.

== Achievements ==
Year	Competition	Venue	Position	Event	Notes
2008	European Championships	Eindhoven, Netherlands	21st	1 m individual	244.55
2008	European Championships	Eindhoven, Netherlands	27th	3 m individual	280.85
2009	Summer Universiade	Belgrade, Serbia	19th	1 m individual	247.85
2009	World Championships	Rome, Italy	26th	1 m individual	311.50
2009	World Championships	Rome, Italy	43rd	3 m individual	314.65
2009	World Championships	Rome, Italy	19th	3 m team	327.42
2010	European Championships	Budapest, Hungary	17th	1 m individual	312.85
2011	European Championships	Turin, Italy	23rd	1 m individual	282.70
2011	European Championships	Turin, Italy	27th	3 m individual	270.95
2011	European Championships	Turin, Italy	12th	3 m team	330.60
2011	World Championships	Shanghai, China	46th	3 m individual	304.15
2011	World Championships	Shanghai, China	17th	3 m team	301.77
