= Maria Marconi =

Italian diver (born 1984)

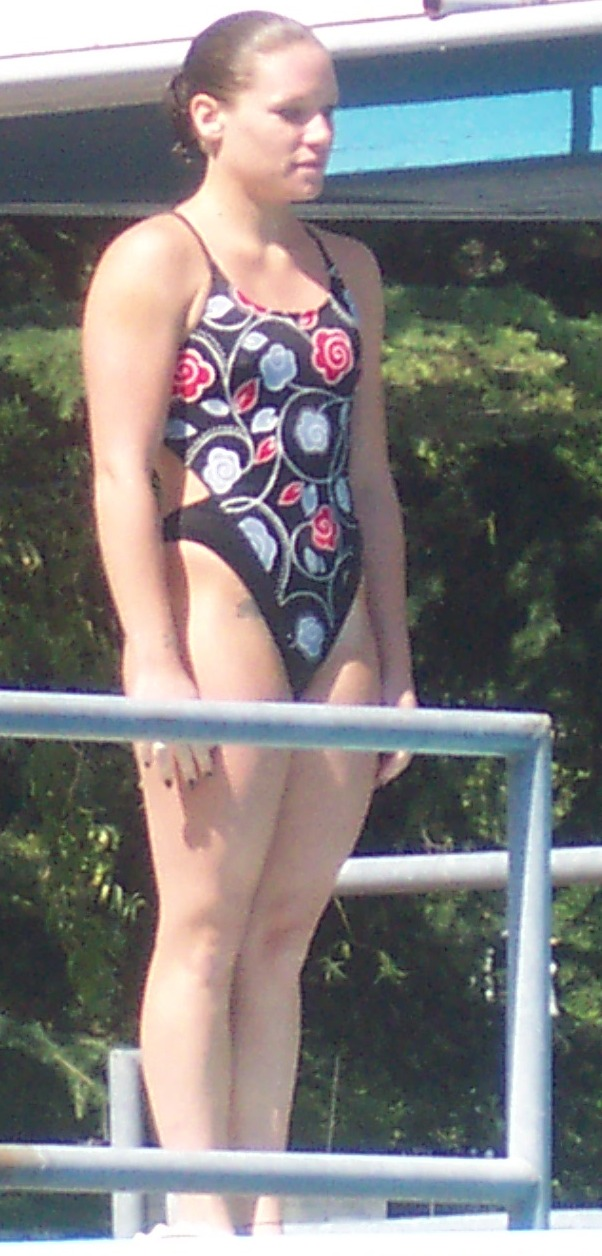
- Image of Maria Marconi

Personal information
- Born: 28 August 1984 (age 41) Rome, Italy

Sport
- Country: Italy
- Sport: Diving
Medal record
Women's diving
Representing Italy
European Diving Championships
| Silver medal – second place | 2009 Turin | 1 m springboard |
European Aquatics Championships
| Bronze medal – third place | 2002 Berlin | 3 m springboard synchro |
| Bronze medal – third place | 2006 Budapest | 1 m springboard |

Maria Marconi (born 28 August 1984) is a diver from Italy, representing her native country at the 2000 Summer Olympics. She won the qualification tournament for the 2008 Summer Olympics, also twice won a bronze medal at the European Championships (2002 and 2006) and once a silver medal (2009). She was 6th in the 1 meter springboard event at the 2009 FINA World Championships.

She is a sister of divers Nicola Marconi and Tommaso Marconi.
