= Diving at the 2017 Summer Universiade – Men's synchronized 3 metre springboard =

Men's synchronized 3 metre springboard at the Universiade
- Venue: University of Taipei (Tianmu) Shin-hsin Hall B1 Diving Pool
- Dates: 25 August 2017
- Competitors: 20 from 10 nations

Medalists
1st place, gold medalist(s)		Ilia Zakharov; Evgeny Kuznetsov	Russia
2nd place, silver medalist(s)		Woo Ha-ram; Kim Yeong-nam	South Korea
3rd place, bronze medalist(s)		Gabriele Auber; Lorenzo Marsaglia	Italy

The men's synchronized 3 metre springboard diving event at the 2017 Summer Universiade was contested on August 25 at the University of Taipei (Tianmu) Shin-hsin Hall B1 Diving Pool in Taipei, Taiwan.

== Schedule ==
All times are Taiwan Standard Time (UTC+08:00)

Date	Time	Event
Sunday, 25 August 2017	16:00	Final

== Results ==
=== Final ===
Rank	Athlete	Dive						Total
Rank	Athlete	1	2	3	4	5	6	Total
1st place, gold medalist(s)	Ilia Zakharov (RUS); Evgeny Kuznetsov (RUS)	49.80	52.80	71.28	89.25	80.58	84.36	428.07
2nd place, silver medalist(s)	Woo Ha-ram (KOR); Kim Yeong-nam (KOR)	50.40	52.20	72.42	83.64	70.35	88.92	417.93
3rd place, bronze medalist(s)	Gabriele Auber (ITA); Lorenzo Marsaglia (ITA)	45.60	49.80	78.75	66.03	78.54	68.40	387.12
4	Oleksandr Gorshkovozov (UKR); Oleg Kolodiy (UKR)	51.00	44.40	84.66	69.75	61.56	72.42	383.79
5	Dashiell Riley Enos (USA); Henry James Fusaro (USA)	49.20	48.00	72.90	68.40	72.54	72.42	383.46
6	Adan Emidio Zuniga (MEX); Rodrigo Diego (MEX)	48.60	48.00	76.50	85.50	74.46	50.31	383.37
7	Andrzej Rzeszutek (POL); Kacper Jakub Lesiak (POL)	47.40	45.00	65.70	68.82	58.14	68.34	353.40
8	Frithjof Seidel (GER); Nico Rene Herzog (GER)	48.60	42.00	63.90	67.32	59.40	66.96	348.18
9	Simon Baptiste Rieckhoff (SUI); Jonathan Alexan Suckow (SUI)	47.40	42.60	64.80	60.18	66.96	59.40	341.34
10	Leong Kam Cheong (MAC); Tang Hio Fong (MAC)	40.20	37.20	48.96	49.41	46.80	38.25	260.82
