= Yuriy Shlyakhov =

Ukrainian diver (1983–2019)

Personal information
- Full name: Yuriy Viktorovych Shlyakhov
- Nationality: Ukraine
- Born: 27 May 1983 Dnipropetrovsk, Ukrainian SSR, Soviet Union
- Died: 23 July 2019 (aged 36) Dnipro, Ukraine
- Height: 1.74 m (5 ft 8 1/2 in)
- Weight: 73 kg (161 lb)

Sport
- Sport: Diving
- Event: Springboard
- Club: Ukraïna Dnipropetrovsk
Medal record
Men's diving
Representing Ukraine
European Championships
Bronze medal – third place	2004 Madrid	3 m synchro
Universiade
Bronze medal – third place	2007 Bangkok	Team
Bronze medal – third place	2007 Bangkok	3 m springboard
Bronze medal – third place	2009 Belgrade	1 m springboard
European Junior Diving Championships
Gold medal – first place	2000 Istanbul	1 m springboard
Gold medal – first place	2000 Istanbul	3 m springboard
Gold medal – first place	2001 Malta	1 m springboard
Gold medal – first place	2001 Malta	3 m springboard
Gold medal – first place	2001 Malta	3 m synchro
Bronze medal – third place	1998 Brasschaat	3 m springboard

Yuriy Viktorovych Shlyakhov (Ukrainian: Юрій Вікторович Шляхов; 27 May 1983 – 23 July 2019) was a Ukrainian springboard diver. He won a bronze medal for the men's individual springboard at the 2007 Summer Universiade in Bangkok, Thailand.

== Career ==
Shlyakhov made his official debut at the 2004 Summer Olympics in Athens, where he placed twenty-sixth in the men's springboard event, with a total score of 377.19 points.

At the 2008 Summer Olympics in Beijing, Shlyakhov scored a total of 405.15 points, with a spectacular performance in the 3 m individual springboard event. He placed twenty-third out of twenty-nine divers in the preliminary competition, failing to advance into the semi-finals.
