= Chris Mears (diver) =

British diver (born 1993)

Chris Mears MBE
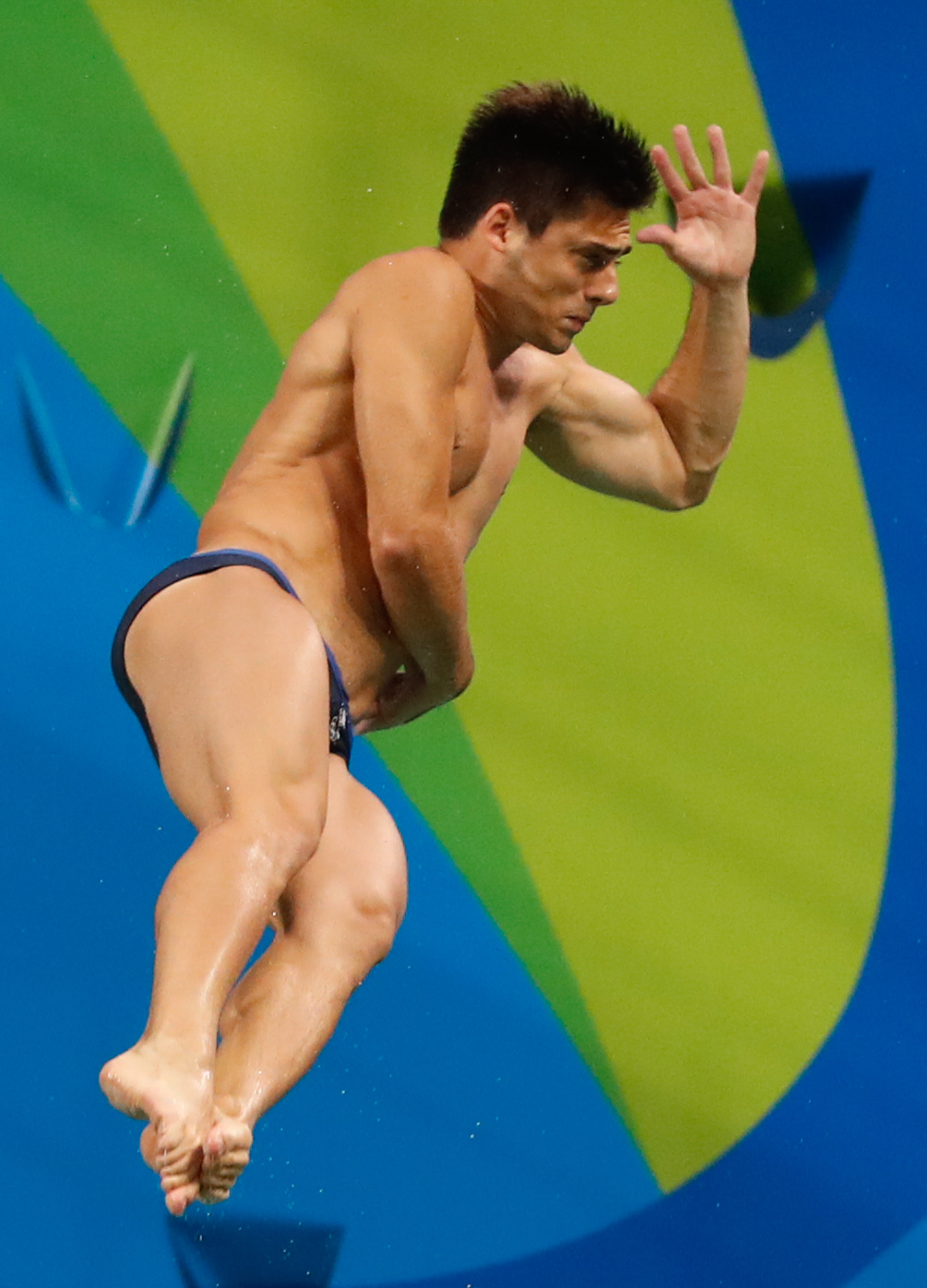
- Chris Mears at the 2016 Olympics in Rio

Personal information
- Full name: Christopher James Mears
- Nickname: Chris
- Born: 7 February 1993 (age 33) Reading, Berkshire
- Height: 1.74 m (5 ft 9 in)

Sport
- Country: Great Britain; England
- Sport: Diving
- Events: 1m, 3m, 3m Synchro
- Club: City of Leeds Diving Club
Medal record
Representing Great Britain
Olympic Games
Gold medal – first place	2016 Rio de Janeiro	3 m synchro
World Championships
Bronze medal – third place	2015 Kazan	3 m synchro
European Championships
Gold medal – first place	2016 London	3 m synchro
Silver medal – second place	2018 Glasgow	3 m synchro
FINA Diving World Cup
Silver medal – second place	2018 Wuhan	3 m synchro
Representing England
Commonwealth Games
Gold medal – first place	2014 Glasgow	3 m synchro
Gold medal – first place	2018 Gold Coast	3 m synchro

Christopher James Mears (born 7 February 1993) is a British diver and DJ/Producer from Burghfield Common, near Reading, Berkshire. He competed at the 2016 Summer Olympics in the synchronised 3m springboard event with Jack Laugher and won gold, the first Olympic gold medal for Britain in diving.

Mears has won two further golds in Men's synchronized 3 metre springboard with Laugher at the Commonwealth Games in 2014 and 2018, one gold and one silver at the European Championships, and one bronze at the World Championships. Aside from diving, Mears also produces music and has released his own songs.

== Early life ==
Mears was born on 7 February 1993 in Reading to Paul and Lorraine Mears. His biological mother died from breast cancer when he was three. His father then married Katy. Mears has an older sister, Natalie, and a younger brother, Charlie. Mears was educated at The Willink School, a co-educational state comprehensive school in the village of Burghfield in Berkshire.

From a young age, Mears attended diving classes at his local club in Reading. He started diving at the Reading Albatross Diving Club, later joining the Southampton Diving Club and began to compete in junior events.

In January 2009 when he was fifteen, Mears suffered a ruptured spleen while he was training in Sydney for the Youth Olympic Festival. He was suffering from glandular fever but was not displaying the usual symptoms. His organs were squeezed by swelling, and further aggravated by the impact of his dives, causing his spleen to rupture. After losing two litres of blood and being given a 5% chance of survival by doctors upon admission to the hospital, he was told it was likely he would never dive again. For several days he was kept alive by medical intervention and his platelet count was at 2. Upon discharge, Mears remained in Australia until fit to fly. However his family returned to their hotel room one morning to find him having a seizure on the floor. Mears suffered a 7-hour seizure in total which led to a three-day coma. Despite being told that he would never dive again, Mears made a slow introduction back into diving, and went on to compete eighteen months later at the 2010 Commonwealth Games in India. He was left with a 30-cm scar down the middle of his abdomen.

== Diving career ==
=== 2010–2011 ===
This year marked Mears's return to the sport after his illness. On a National stage, he competed in the synchro with Nicholas Robinson-Baker as diving partner, claiming gold at National Cup and again at National Championships. He was placed 4th with Robinson-Baker at the Commonwealth Games in Delhi.

Mears won gold at National Cup in 2011, and bronze at British Championships. Mears and Robinson-Baker won a silver medal during the 2011 FINA Diving World Series, were placed fourth in the 2010 Commonwealth Games.

=== 2012–2013 ===
2012 saw him take silver at National Cup and bronze at British Championships. On 11 June 2012, the British Olympic Association announced that Mears had been selected to represent Great Britain in the 3-m springboard and 3M synchro, at the London 2012 Olympic Games. Mears's father, Paul was nominated by the B.O.A to carry the Olympic Torch during the 70-day relay in recognition of the time he spent at his son's bedside during his severe illness in 2009. Mears made it to the final of the men's 3-m springboard, placing 9th. His last dive was scored at 100.70, the highest scored dive of the competition. Mears and Robinson-Baker placed 5th in the synchro.

Mears competed in the World Series circuit with diving partner Robinson-Baker in the synchro, and also competed in the individual event. The pair won bronze in Edinburgh and bronze twice in Guadalajara, Mexico. Mears also scored a total of 455.50 points- fourth position in the individual 3m in Guadalajara, Mexico- his best individual World Series performance to date. Mears and Robinson-Baker ended 2013 ranked seventh best in the world by FINA. Mears also participated in the 2012 European Championships, finishing 8th in the 3 m springboard and 5th in the synchro event on the same occasion.

Mears also competed at the 2012 Summer Olympics in the men's 3-metre springboard individually, and the 3-metre synchronised springboard event with his team-mate Nicholas Robinson-Baker. At the Olympics the pair finished in fifth place, while Mears was ninth in the individual competition.

In 2013, Mears teamed up with Jack Laugher in the 3-metre Springboard, but did not qualify for the final of the World Championships in Barcelona.

=== 2014–2015 ===
Mears spent the beginning of the year recovering from an ankle injury at the Team GB Intensive Rehabilitation Facility at Bisham Abbey and so did not compete at 2014 National Cup in Southend. He also missed the first two legs of the 2014 FINA Diving World Series held in China and Dubai due to the injury.

In the beginning of the year, Mears relocated to Leeds to train alongside Laugher. The John Charles Centre for Sport is one of the UK's high performance centres for diving, and plays host to all 3-metre competitors competing for the British Diving Team. Mears and Laugher first competed together that year in the World Diving Series in London in April 2014 and finished fourth. In May 2014, the duo won bronze in the 3m synchronised at the FINA Diving World Series in Moscow.

Mears and Laugher won their first gold medal on the 3 metre synchronised springboard at the 2014 Commonwealth Games.

In 2015, Mears and Laugher won bronze in the World Championships in Kazan.

=== 2016 ===
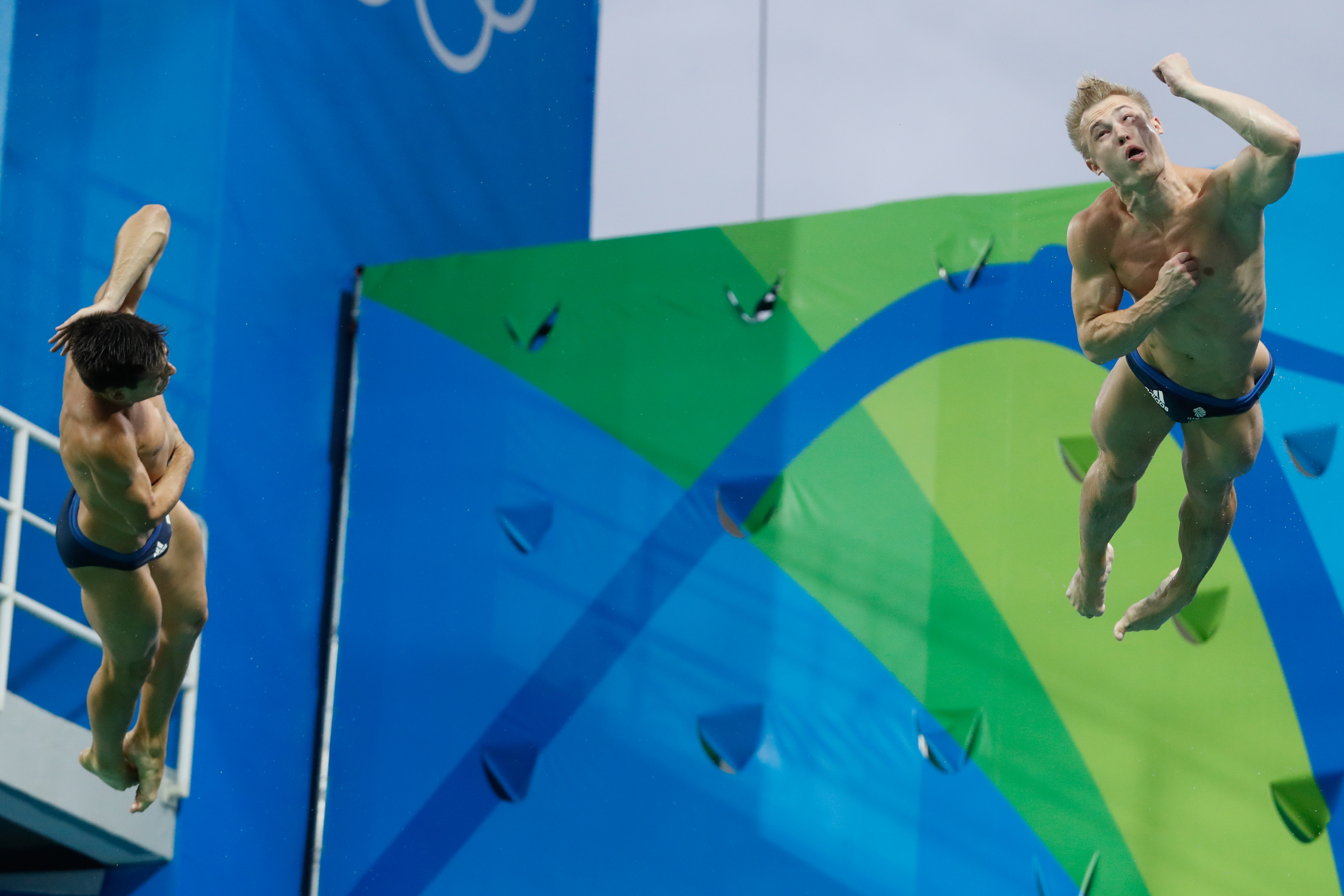
Chris Mears and Jack Laugher at the 2016 Olympics in Rio

In May 2016, Mears and Jack Laugher won the 3m synchronised springboard at the European Championships in London.

Mears was selected alongside synchro partner Laugher to represent Great Britain in the 2016 Rio Olympics where they won a gold medal in the Men's 3m Synchronised Diving event, scoring a total of 454.32 points beating the American pair Sam Dorman and Michael Hixon (450.21) and the Chinese pair Qin Kai and Cao Yuan (443.70). This is the first ever Olympic gold medal won in British diving.

=== 2017 ===
Laugher and Mears won three silvers in the 3m Synchro in four events of the Fina/NVC Diving World Series, two in China and one in Russia. However they finished out of the medal position in fourth at the 2017 World Aquatics Championships.

=== 2018 ===
At the 2018 Commonwealth Games held at the Gold Coast, Australia, Mears and Laugher successfully defended their title, winning gold in the men's 3 metre synchronised springboard event.

At the 2018 FINA Diving World Cup held in Wuhan, Mears and Laugher won a silver in 3 metre synchro springboard. At the 2018 European Championships in Glasgow/Edinburgh, the pair also won silver in the 3 metre synchro.

Mears took a year out from competition starting October 2018 to focus on music and other projects.

=== 2019 ===
On 6 August 2019, Mears announced his retirement from diving on Instagram, choosing to focus on his music career instead.

== Music ==
During the recovery period from his illness, Mears took up music production as a hobby whilst bed-ridden. He bought a guitar and started to learn to play, and also bought a Mac computer to create his own music on the Logic apps. He used his bedroom as a studio and began to produce Electronic Dance Music and House Music. In 2012, after the Olympics he signed with Insanity Artists booking agency. His first large scale performance was on 29 May 2013 at Woodstoke Festival supporting Labrinth and Pendulum. In February 2014 Mears released a preview of three new tracks on his SoundCloud page. He released a single titled "Mexico" in Latin America through Universal Music in 2015.

== Personal life ==
Mears has actively supported athletes being open about homosexuality in sports, posing for Gay Times magazine for the March 2013 issue and also releasing a press statement in support of his friend Tom Daley on his official Facebook page in December 2013.

Mears appeared in PETA's campaign against swim-with-dolphin parks, saying that although he and his parents had previously visited such places while on holiday, "We had absolutely no idea how these animals are treated."

== Honours ==
Mears, along with Laugher, was appointed Member of the Order of the British Empire (MBE) in the 2017 New Year Honours for services to diving.

== Diving achievements ==
Competition	2008	2009	2010	2011	2012	2013	2014	2015	2016	2017	2018
Olympics, 3m springboard					9th						
Olympics, 3m synchro					5th				1st		
Commonwealth Games, 1m springboard							4th				
Commonwealth Games, 3m springboard											
Commonwealth Games, 3m synchro			4th				1st				1st
World Championships, 1m springboard				14th		16th					
World Championships, 3m springboard				30th		31st			15th		
World Championships, 3m syncrho				7th		8th		3rd		4th	
European Championship, 3m springboard			19th		8th		14th				
European Championship, 3m synchro			5th		5th		5th				
FINA World Cup, 3m springboard,			17th		16th						
FINA World Cup, 3m Synchro						10th			5th		2nd
World Junior Championship, 1m springboard,	15th										
World Junior Championship, 3m springboard,	7th										
European Junior Championship, 1m springboard,	2nd										
European Junior Championship, 3m springboard,	2nd										
European Junior Championship, 10m platform,	3rd										
British Championship, 3m springboard,	8th		5th	3rd	3rd	7th			2nd		
British Championship, 3m synchro,	2nd		1st	1st	1st				1st		
British Championship, 1m springboard,	4th		5th	2nd		3rd					
British Gas National Cup, 1m springboard,											
British Gas National Cup, 3m springboard,			7th	3rd	2nd						
British Gas National Cup, 3m synchro,			1st	1st							
