= Edickson Contreras =

Venezuelan diver (born 1990)

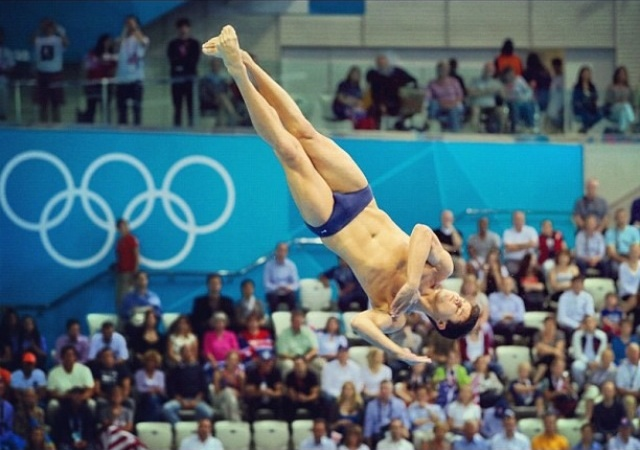
- Contreras at the 2012 London Olympics

Personal information
- Born: 11 October 1990 (age 34); Cabimas, Zulia, Venezuela

Sport
- Sport: Diving

Edickson David Contreras Bracho (born 11 October 1990) is a Venezuelan diver. He competed in the 3 m springboard event at the 2012 Summer Olympics.
