= Tommaso Marconi =

Italian diver (born 1982)

Personal information
- Born: 17 January 1982 (age 44) Rome, Italy

Sport
- Sport: Diving
Medal record
Representing Italy
European Championships
Gold medal – first place	2004 Madrid	3 m synchro
Bronze medal – third place	2002 Berlin	3 m synchro
Bronze medal – third place	2006 Budapest	3 m synchro

Tommaso Marconi (born 17 January 1982) is an Italian diver.

== Biography ==
In the 3 metre platform synchronized event he won the gold medal at the 2004 European Championships and the bronze medals at the European Championships in 2002 and 2006. He also competed at the 2004 Olympic Games and the 2008 Olympic Games.

He is a brother of divers Maria Marconi and Nicola Marconi.
