= Martin Wolfram =

German diver

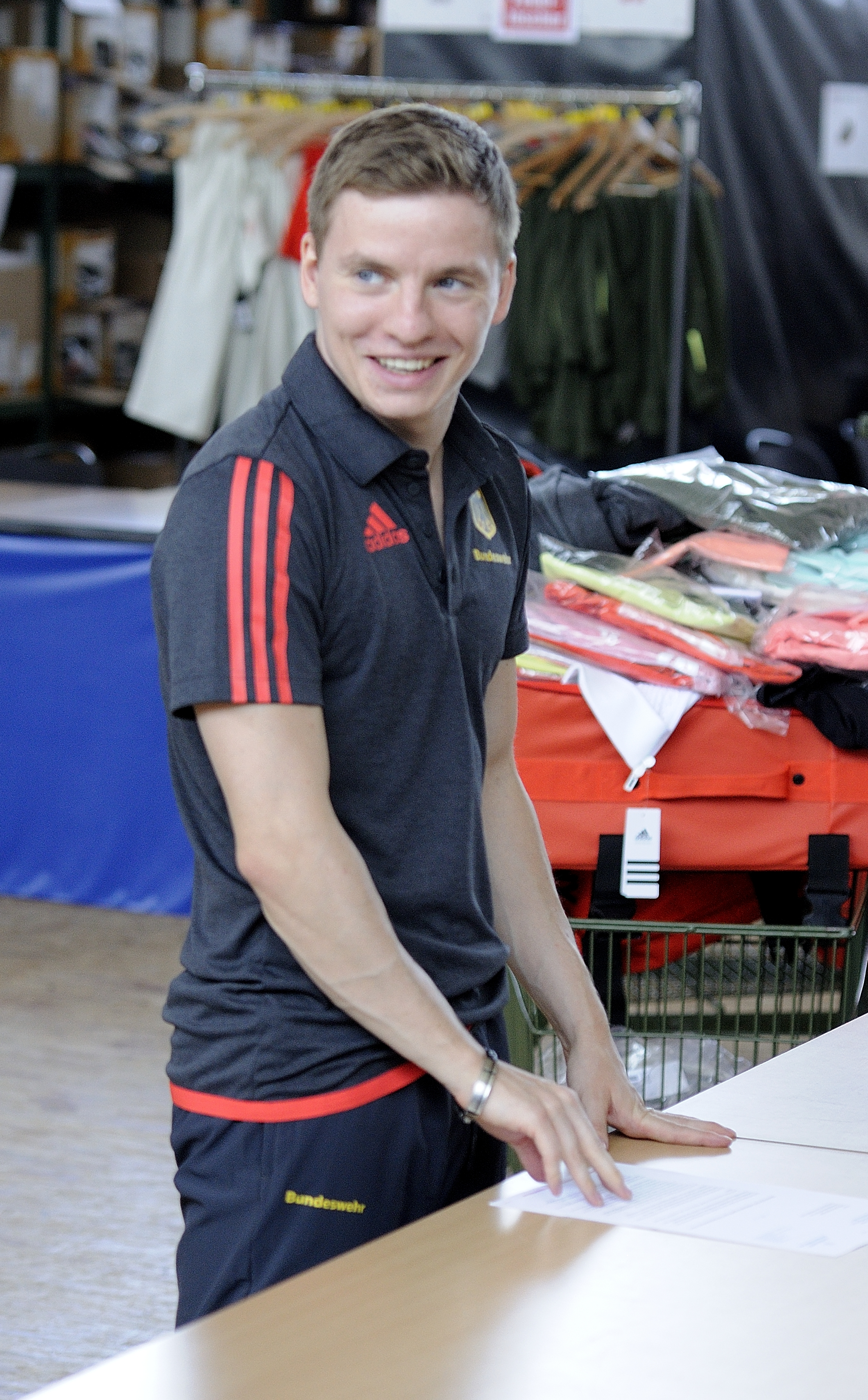

Personal information
- Nationality: German
- Born: 29 January 1992 (age 34) Dresden, Germany
- Height: 1.64 m (5 ft 5 in)
- Weight: 55 kg (121 lb)

Sport
- Country: Germany
- Sport: Diving
- Event(s): 1 m, 3 m
Medal record
Men's diving
Representing Germany
European Championships
Silver medal – second place	2013 Rostock	1 m springboard
Gold medal – first place	2015 Rostock	10 m platform
Bronze medal – third place	2020 Budapest	3 m springboard

Martin Wolfram (born 29 January 1992 in Dresden) is a German diver. He represented Germany at the 2012 Summer Olympics. At the time he competed in the Olympics, his height was 5 ft 5 in (1.65 m) and his weight was 123 lb (56 kg). Martin injured his arm whilst diving in the 10m platform competition. He finished 4th in the preliminary rounds with 496.80, 5th in the semi-finals with 519.00 and 8th in the finals 506.65. He was flown back to Germany after his injury.

At the 2016 Summer Olympics, he competed in the men's 10 m platform event. He finished in 5th place.

At the 2020 Summer Olympics, he finished in 7th in the men's 3 m springboard.
