= Grant Nel =

Australian diver (born 1988)

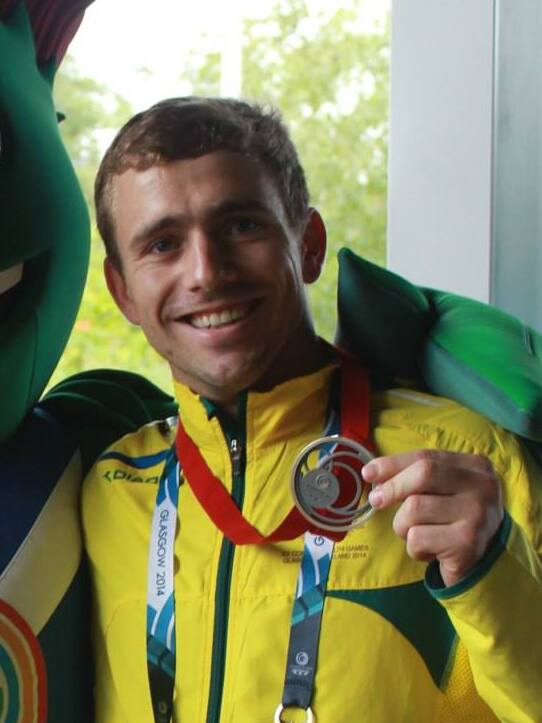
- Nel in 2014

Personal information
- National team: Australia
- Born: 7 April 1988 (age 38) Johannesburg, South Africa
- Height: 1.74 m (5 ft 9 in)

Sport
- Event: Diving
- College team: Texas A&M
- Club: Victoria
Medal record
Commonwealth Games
Silver medal – second place	2014 Glasgow	Synchronised 3 m springboard
Bronze medal – third place	2010 Delhi	3 m springboard
Bronze medal – third place	2014 Glasgow	1 m springboard

Grant Roy Nel (born 7 April 1988) is an Australian diver. Nel won three medals for Australia at the 2010 and 2014 Commonwealth Games, and represented Australia in the 2016 Summer Olympics.

== Early life and college career ==
Nel was born in Johannesburg, South Africa, on 7 April 1988. His mother, Avril, represented South Africa in gymnastics. Nel was a gymnast until he broke both of his hands when he was nine, when he switched sports to diving. Nel moved to Australia in 2001. He first competed in the World Diving Championships in 2007, participating in five consecutive championships until 2015. Nel attended Yarra Valley Grammar in Ringwood, Victoria, and Texas A&M University. At Texas A&M, Nel set school records in three separate dives, including the three-metre springboard at 476.48. He additionally received NCAA All-American honors and Team MVP.

== Professional career ==
=== 2010 Commonwealth Games ===
At the 2010 Commonwealth Games, Nel competed in five diving events, winning bronze in the 3 m springboard with a score of 456.55.

=== 2014 Commonwealth Games ===
At the 2014 Commonwealth Games, Nel failed to qualify for the individual 3 m springboard final after he scored zero points after slipping during a dive and landing on his back. The day after, Nel won silver in the synchronised 3 m springboard with Matthew Mitcham. Nel won bronze in the 1 m springboard, scoring 303.40 points.

=== 2016 Summer Olympics ===
Nel represented Australia at the 2016 Summer Olympics. Nel had previously failed to qualify for the 2012 Summer Olympics after receiving shoulder surgery. Nel competed in the men's 3 metre springboard, where he finished 16th in the preliminary round with 395.05 points, advancing to the semi-finals. In the semi-final, Nel scored 368.35 points and placed 15th overall, failing to advance to the finals. The previous year, Nel was set back by a back joint injury that left him bedridden for six weeks.

Nel announced his retirement from diving on 17 August 2017.

== Personal life ==
Nel married in 2016 and holds a degree in agricultural engineering. His sister is Australian Fulbright Scholar and plant ecologist Tracey Vivien Steinrucken.
