= Matthew Mitcham =

Australian diver and trampoline gymnast

Matthew Mitcham OAM
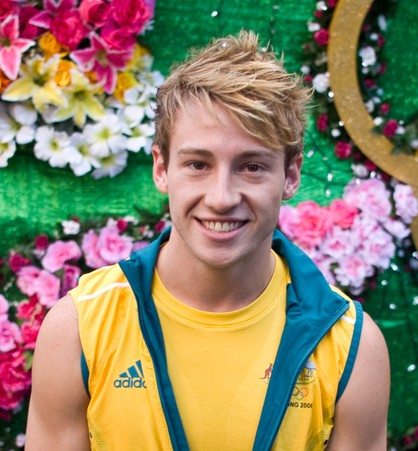

Personal information
- Full name: Matthew John Mitcham
- Nickname: Matt
- Born: 2 March 1988 (age 38) Brisbane, Queensland, Australia
- Height: 174 cm (5 ft 9 in)
- Spouse: Luke Rutherford (m. 2020; div. 2024)

Sport
- Country: Australia
- Events: 1 m, 3 m, 5 m, 7 m, 10 m
- Club: Abbotsleigh Diving Club NSW, Perfect 10 diving
- Former partner: Scott Robertson (3 m)
- Coached by: Chava Sobrino
- Retired: 2016
Medal record
Representing Australia
Olympic Games
Gold medal – first place	2008 Beijing	10m platform
World Championships
Bronze medal – third place	2009 Rome	1m springboard
Commonwealth Games
Gold medal – first place	2014 Glasgow	Synchro 10m platform
Silver medal – second place	2010 Delhi	1m springboard
Silver medal – second place	2010 Delhi	Synchro 3m springboard
Silver medal – second place	2010 Delhi	10m platform
Silver medal – second place	2010 Delhi	Synchro 10m platform
Silver medal – second place	2014 Glasgow	1m springboard
Silver medal – second place	2014 Glasgow	Synchro 3m springboard

Matthew John Mitcham OAM (born 2 March 1988) is an Australian retired diver and trampolinist. As a diver, he was the 2008 Olympic champion in the 10m platform, and he is the 2nd highest single-dive score in Olympic history (at the time it was the highest scoring dive ever). This made him the first openly gay man to win an Olympic gold medal. He is also the first Australian male to win an Olympic gold medal in diving since Dick Eve at the 1924 Summer Olympics.

== Career ==
Mitcham originally competed as a trampoline gymnast. He was spotted by Wang Tong Xiang, who is a coach at the Australian Institute of Sport Diving Program, while at the Chandler Aquatic Centre in Brisbane's suburbs, and Mitcham continued with both diving and trampolining for several years.

As a trampolinist, Mitcham represented Australia at the World Junior Championships in 1999 and 2001, winning the double mini-tramp event. He also competed at the Australian Youth Olympic Festival in 2003, finishing sixth.

From 2002 through 2004, Mitcham was a national junior champion in diving, winning the events in which he competed. Mitcham competed at the 2002 World Junior Diving Championships, where he placed 11th in the 1 metre (3 ft 3 in) springboard, 5th in the 3 m and 16th in the 10 m platform. In 2004, he won the silver medals in the 1 m, 3 m synchronised, and 10 m platform events at the World Junior Championships. At the 2004 Junior Nationals, he won the 1 m, 3 m, and 10 m and 3 m synchro titles. At the 2004 Olympic Trials, he placed 3rd on the 3 m and 10 m individual events, 2nd on the 3 m and 10 m synchro events, and did not qualify for the Olympic team. In 2005, Mitcham won his first senior national title. He competed at the Australian Olympic Youth Festival, where he won the silver medal in the 1 m with a score of 508.35, and won the 3 m, 10 m and 3 m synchro (with Scott Robertson) titles with scores of 565, 555.8, and 316.23 respectively. At the 2005 World Aquatics Championships in Montreal, he placed 12th on the 10 m platform with a score of 560.73.

In 2006, Mitcham competed in the German Grand Prix event, placing 16th on the 3 m and 6th on the 10 m, and at the US Grand Prix at Fort Lauderdale, placing 8th on the 3m springboard. At the Canada Cup he placed 26th on the 3 m and won the bronze medal on the 10 m platform. He represented Australia at the 2006 Commonwealth Games, where he competed in the 1 m, 3 m, and 10 m events. He placed 4th in the 3 m and the 3 m synchro with Robertson, and 5th on the 1 m and 10 m events.

Taking a break from the sport in 2006, he returned in 2007 and started to train under current coach Chava Sobrino at the New South Wales Institute of Sport. In 2008 Mitcham won the 1 m, 3 m and 10 m individual events at the Australian Nationals. Later that year he won the 2008 Diving Grand Prix event in Fort Lauderdale, Florida.

=== 2008 Summer Olympics ===
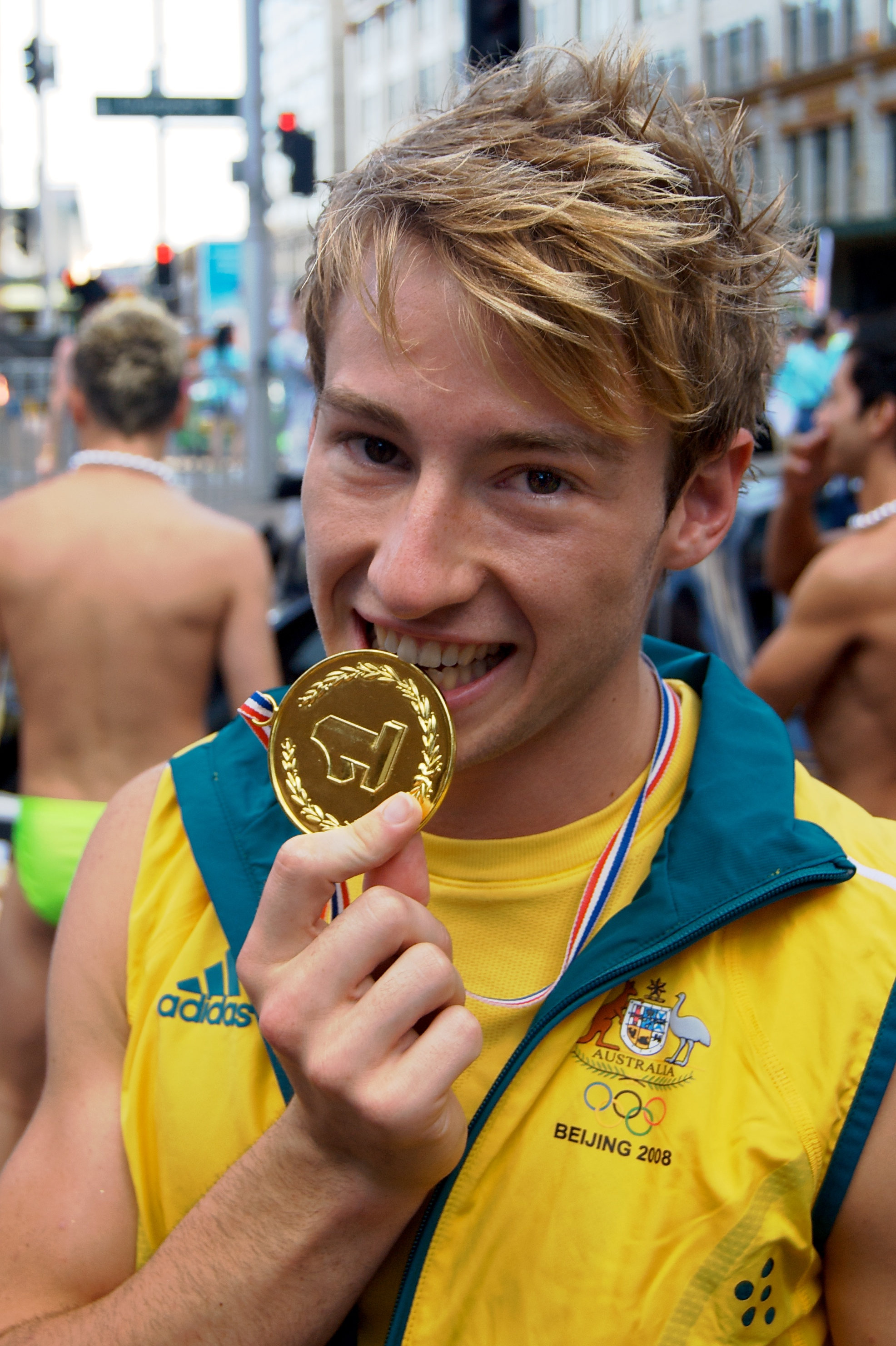
Mitcham at the 2009 Mardi Gras, Sydney

Mitcham represented Australia at the 2008 Summer Olympics in the 10 m platform and the 3 m springboard events. He placed 16th on the 3 m springboard and did not qualify for the final. He qualified in second position for the semi-final and final of the 10 m platform event. After experiencing mixed success in his first five dives in the final, Mitcham entered the final round of dives in second place, 34 points behind Chinese diver Zhou Lüxin. After Zhou performed his worst dive of the final and scored 74.80, Mitcham still needed to score 107.30, a very high score on the platform, to win the gold. However, his near-perfect final dive drew four perfect 10 scores from judges and achieved a score of 112.10, the highest single-dive score in Olympic history at the time. He finished with an overall score of 537.95 to defeat Zhou, who finished with an overall score of 533.15, to win Australia's second diving medal of the Games. His win prevented China from claiming a clean-sweep of all diving gold medals at the Olympic Games. He is the first Australian male to win an Olympic gold medal in diving since Dick Eve in 1924.

It's absolutely surreal. I never thought that this would be possible, I wasn't even sure of my medal chances at all. After I did my last dive and I saw I was in first, I thought, "That's it, it's a silver medal, I am so happy with this" and then I won. I can't believe it, I'm so happy.

— Matthew Mitcham

Mitcham's medal was followed by the Australia Post issuing a 50-cent stamp of him.

=== 2009 and beyond ===
Following his victory at the 2008 Summer Olympics, Mitcham placed fourth in his next major contest on the 10-metre platform, the 2009 World Aquatics Championships in Rome. He was beaten narrowly by Zhou Lüxin, the Chinese diver he'd beaten in the Olympics final, while British youngster Tom Daley took home the championship.

At the 2010 Commonwealth Games, Mitcham won four silver medals, partnering fellow Australian diver Ethan Warren to come runner-up in the synchronized events in both the 3 and 10-metre. In the 1 metre springboard final he lost to Canadian Alexandre Despatie. In his specialist event, the 10-metre platform, he again lost to Tom Daley.

As outlined in his 2012 autobiography, Mitcham commenced use of recreational methamphetamine in 2011, becoming addicted to the substance and subsequently recovering with the assistance of Narcotics Anonymous. Mitcham is quoted as saying "I had still failed to achieve my childhood dream of becoming the best in the world at something," and so had turned to drug use. Australian Olympic Committee officials, in November 2012, stated that they had been unaware of the drug use (which occurred prior to the London 2012 Summer Olympics), but welcomed Mitcham's recovery.

In December 2011, Mitcham returned from an abdominals injury to win the Australian 10-metre platform with 480.05 points putting his Olympic dreams back on track. Not only did Mitcham achieve this accolade, he was also named Male Diver of the Year 2012.

Mitcham placed 13th in the semifinals of the 10m event at the 2012 Summer Olympics, narrowly missing the mark to qualify for the finals.

In November 2012, he published an autobiography entitled Twists and Turns.

In 2013, Mitcham performed as an MC during the Melbourne Cabaret Festival, and they subsequently assisted him to turn his autobiography into a cabaret show. After a successful crowdfunding campaign in December 2013, the show premiered at the 2014 Fringe World festival in Perth. The show has toured Australia and notably featured in the 2015 Sydney Mardi Gras festival.

In 2013, Mitcham became a judge on the Australian diving show Celebrity Splash!, alongside Greg Louganis and Alisa Camplin. The show's ratings were low by the end of the season, and it was cut short.

Mitcham announced his retirement from diving at the beginning of 2016 to focus on his showbiz career.

=== Dancing with the Stars ===
Mitcham was a celebrity contestant on the fifteenth season of Dancing with the Stars, which premiered on 19 July 2015. He and his professional dance partner Masha Belash finished in second place.

Matthew Mitcham - Dancing with the Stars (season 15)
Week	Dance	Music	Judges' scores (Note: Individual judges' scores are listed in the following order: Todd McKenney, Helen Richey, Kym Johnson.)			Total score	Result
1	Cha-cha-cha	"Can You Feel It" — The Jacksons	9	8	8	33 (Note: Matthew also received a score of 8 from guest judge Bruno Tonioli.)	Safe
2	Salsa	"Spice Up Your Life" — Spice Girls	8	8	8	32 (Note: Matthew also received a score of 8 from guest judge Bruno Tonioli.)	Safe
3	Foxtrot	"The Girl from Ipanema" — Nat King Cole	9	10	9	37 (Note: Matthew also received a score of 9 from guest judge Bruno Tonioli.)	Safe
4	Viennese waltz	"Can't Help Falling in Love" — Elvis Presley	9	7	9	25	Safe
5	Jive	"Don't Stop Me Now" — Queen	8	7	9	24	Safe
5	Foxtrot (Dance-off)	"Ain't That a Kick in the Head?" — Dean Martin	Winner			3 (Note: Matthew received three bonus points for winning this dance-off.)	Safe
6	Paso doble	"Sweet Disposition" — The Temper Trap	9	7	9	25	Bottom two
6	Team dance	"Trouble" — Iggy Azalea, featuring Jennifer Hudson	9	9	9	27	Bottom two
7	Cha-cha-cha & Tango (Fusion dance)	"Ghost Town" — Adam Lambert	8	8	9	25	Safe
7	Waltz	"Mr. Bojangles" — Nitty Gritty Dirt Band	8	9	10	27	Safe
8 (Night 1)	Samba	"Hip Hip Chin Chin" — Club des Belugas	10	9	10	29	Safe
8 (Night 1)	Contemporary	"I'm Not the Only One" — Sam Smith	10	10	10	30	Safe
8 (Night 2)	Cha-cha-cha	"Can You Feel It" — The Jacksons	9	10	10	29	Runner-up
8 (Night 2)	Freestyle	"Valerie" — Mark Ronson, featuring Amy Winehouse	9	10	9	28	Runner-up

== Sponsorships ==
Despite his diving achievements, Mitcham struggled to attract corporate sponsorship. In The Advocate, an editor said, "What's a guy to do when he's got the gold, the fame, the man - but no big-time endorsements?" In 2009, Mitcham secured financial support from the Australian telecommunications provider Telstra.

In March 2010, Mitcham was announced as the new face of Funky Trunks and has appeared on advertising campaigns across Australia, Europe and the United States. He is also a spokesman and "swimwear ambassador" for the brand.

== Other appearances ==
In 2009, Matthew Mitcham was the Chief of Parade of the Sydney Gay and Lesbian Mardi Gras after being declared the 2008 Australian Sports Performer of the Year. In February and March 2010, Mitcham appeared in the second season of Rexona Greatest Athlete Australia reality television series in which 8 of Australia's most popular sports athletes compete in 8 episodes in various challenges to win the "best athlete" award. He also announced taking part in the Cologne 2010 Gay Games in Germany. He was seen promoting the Games. The event featured 35 sports, as well as community and cultural events. He competed in an episode of Australian game show Talkin' 'Bout Your Generation, representing 'Gen Y' with comedian Josh Thomas. He appeared in an episode of Celebrity Come Dine With Me Australia with entertainer Maria Venuti, presenter Sophie Falkiner and X Factor Presenter Luke Jacobz who battled it out to win $2000 for their charity. In March 2015, he starred in 'Are You Ready For Freddie', a tribute video to Freddie Mercury organised by the Sydney Mardi Gras. The video went viral, reaching more than 1.3 million views.

== Recognition ==
- 2020 - Sport Australia Hall of Fame inductee

== Personal life ==
Mitcham publicly came out as gay in 2008 to the Sydney Morning Herald when they were profiling Olympic hopefuls. During the 2008 Beijing Olympics, he was also featured on the cover of the international gay publication The Advocate in August 2008 and March 2009, as well as the cover of Australian gay publication DNA. Mitcham's then-boyfriend, Lachlan Fletcher, attended the 2008 Summer Olympics as a spectator. His trip was sponsored by a grant from Johnson & Johnson's Athlete Family Support Program.

Mitcham gained media coverage in Australia as reporters thought he was the first Australian to compete at the Olympic Games as an openly gay man at the time of his competition. However, Craig Rogerson, the Australian diver, had publicly announced he was gay before the 1996 Summer Olympics, as had Mathew Helm, the Australian diver who won the silver medal at the 2004 Summer Olympics in the men's 10m platform. Other notable gay Australian Olympians include Ji Wallace, who competed at the 2000 Summer Olympics and won a silver medal in the inaugural trampoline event; however, he came out after the Games, as well as Daniel Kowalski and Ian Thorpe.

Prior to his 10m platform win, Outsports.com reported Mitcham to be one of only ten openly gay athletes competing in the 2008 Beijing Olympics.

Mitcham has said when asked to comment on his coming out: "I don’t see sexuality as influencing my beliefs or opinions or perceptions of anybody, whether they’re gay, straight, bi, trans, experimental, I don’t care. I see it as a very uninfluential factor in people." Mitcham has said that after the Beijing Olympics, he received many letters from gay teenagers, "and that was really nice, really humbling".

In 2009 and 2010, Mitcham was selected by readers of samesame.com.au as one of the 25 most influential gay Australians.

On 3 June 2019, he announced his engagement to his British boyfriend Luke Rutherford. The couple married in February 2020. In 2024 Mitcham announced that they would be divorcing after four years of marriage.

As of October 2021, Mitcham lives in London, England, and is friends with Tom Daley.

As of 2024, Mitcham was creating content, including semi-frontal nude photographs, for OnlyFans. He told the Associated Press that he earned three times more income from his work on OnlyFans than from athletic sponsorships. He described himself as a "sex worker-lite."
