= Tommaso Rinaldi =

Italian diver (born 1991)

Personal information
- Nationality: Italian
- Born: 18 January 1991 (age 35) Rome, Italy
- Height: 1.80 m (5 ft 11 in)
- Weight: 72 kg (159 lb)

Sport
- Sport: Diving
- Events: 1 m, 3 m, 3 m synchro, 10 m
- Club: G.S. Fiamme Oro (2001–2008); G.S. Marina Militare (2009- )

Tommaso Rinaldi (born 18 January 1991) is an Italian diver. Born in Rome, he competed in the 3 m springboard event at the 2012 Summer Olympics. His father, Domenico Rinaldi was also an Olympic diver who participated in the 1984 and 1988 games.

Rinaldi is an athlete of the Gruppo Sportivo della Marina Militare, before he competed for Gruppo Sportivo Fiamme Oro.
