= Chris Colwill =

American diver (born 1984)

Personal information
- Full name: Christopher Colwill
- Born: September 11, 1984 (age 41) Brandon, Florida, U.S.
- Height: 5 ft 10 in (178 cm)

Sport
- Country: United States
- Event(s): 1m, 3m, 3m synchro
- College team: University of Georgia
- Club: Georgia Dive Club
- Partner: Jevon Tarantino
- Coached by: Dan Laak

Christopher Colwill (born September 11, 1984) is an American international diver from Tampa, Florida. Colwill graduated from Tampa Preparatory School in 2003 and dove for the University of Georgia in Athens, Georgia under dive coach Dan Laak.

He is hard of hearing, with a 60% hearing loss.

Colwill competed at the FINA Diving World Cup in China in 2006 in the 1m event finishing third. He won the 2006 NCAA Division I national title in the 1m and 3m spring board. He was unable to compete at the 2007 NCAA national meet due to an injury but rebounded to take the first prize on the 1m spring board in 2008. Colwill was a member of the United States Olympic team at the 2008 Olympic Games in Beijing, participating in the 3 meter springboard and the synchronized 3 meter with teammate Jevon Tarantino.

He was also a member of the United States Olympic team at the 2012 Olympic Games in London in the 3 meter springboard.

== See also ==
- Georgia Bulldogs
- Deaf people in the Olympics
