= Freddie Woodward =

British diver (born 1995)

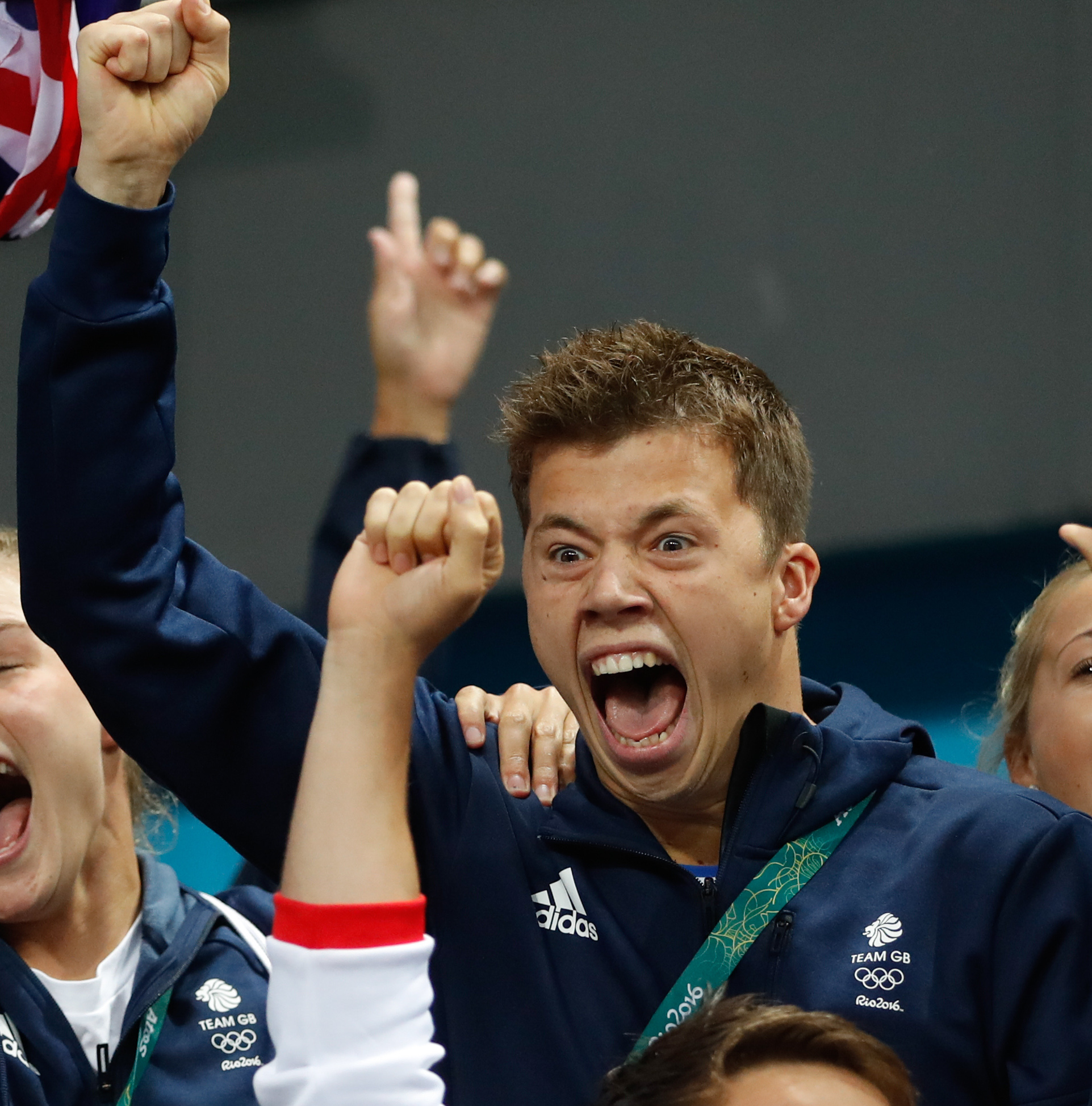
- Woodward cheering for teammates' gold medal at the 2016 Olympics

Personal information
- Full name: Frederick Bevis Woodward
- Nationality: British
- Born: 23 June 1995 (age 31) Sheffield, England
- Height: 5 ft 10 in (178 cm)
- Weight: 72 kg (159 lb)

Sport
- Country: United Kingdom; England
- Sport: Diving
- Event: Men's 3 metre springboard
Medal record
Men's diving
Representing England
Commonwealth Games
Bronze medal – third place	2014 Glasgow	3m synchro
European Diving Championships
Bronze medal – third place	2017 Kiev	3m synchro
British Championships
Gold medal – first place	2018 Plymouth	1m springboard
Gold medal – first place	2018 Plymouth	3m synchro
- Updated on 11 October 2014

Frederick Bevis Woodward (born 23 June 1995) is a British diver. He competed for England in the men's 3 metre springboard event at the 2014 Commonwealth Games where he won a bronze medal with his diving partner, Nicholas Robinson-Baker. He took part in the Rio 2016 Summer Olympics 3m springboard but narrowly missed qualifying for the semi-finals.

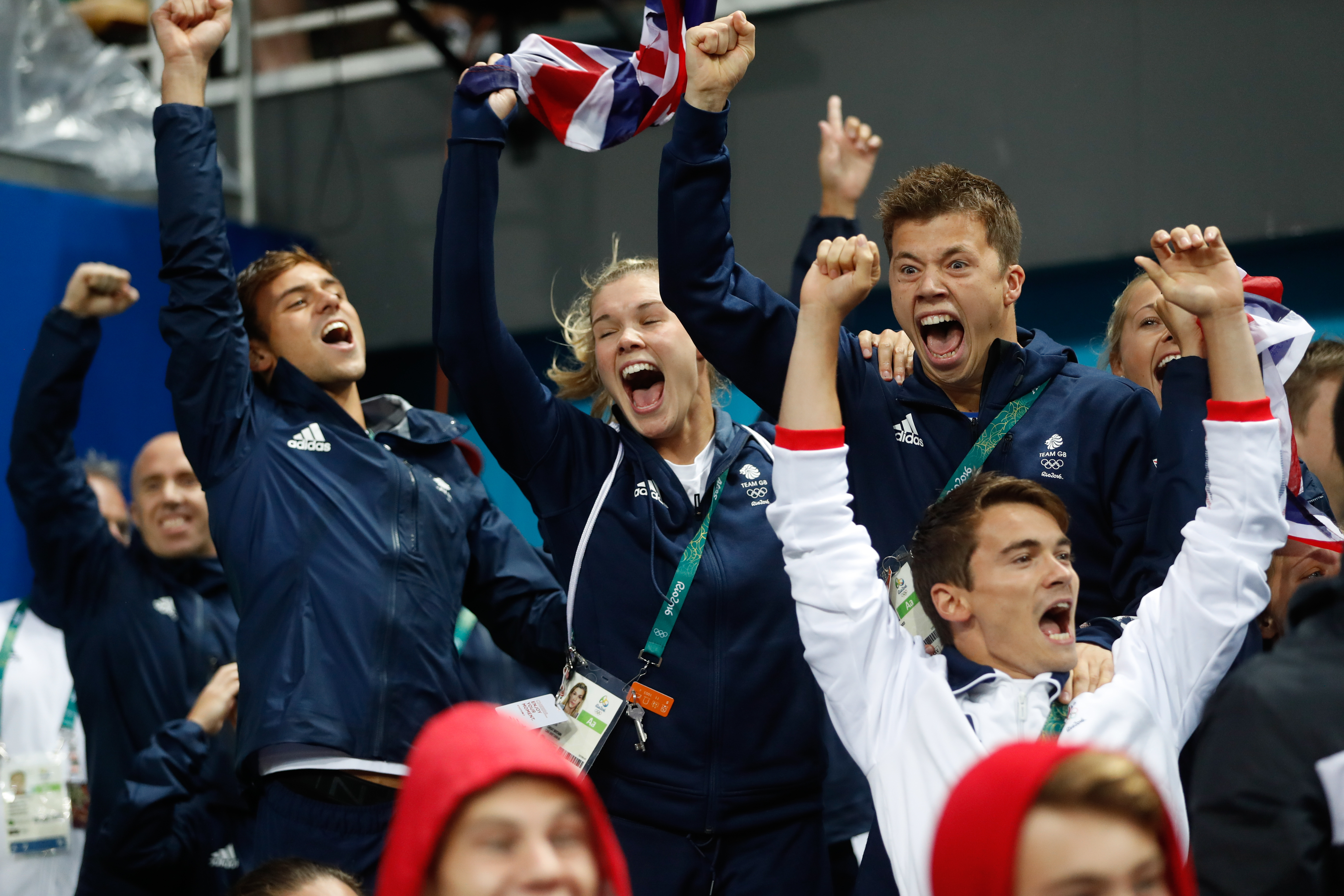
Freddie Woodward and other members of team GB at the Rio Olympics

Woodward is the current British 3m synchro (with James Heatly) and 1m individual champion, winning both events at the 2018 British Diving Championships.

Woodward retired in 2018, stating that a career in competitive diving was not sustainable in his current position. He subsequently spent 6 months on a cruise-liner, acting as an on-board aquatics performer, before returning to the UK. He has since continued in his work as an on-board aquatics performer for a second cruise season.

== Personal life ==
In 2026, Woodward said he was addicted to porn while growing up, including while in training for the Olympics.
