= Nicola Marconi =

Italian diver (born 1978)

Personal information
- Born: 12 November 1978 (age 47) Rome, Italy

Sport
- Country: Italy
- Sport: Diving
Medal record
Men's diving
Representing Italy
European Championships
Bronze medal – third place	2009 Turin	3 m synchro
European Aquatics Championships
Gold medal – first place	1999 Istanbul	3 m synchro
Gold medal – first place	2002 Berlin	1 m springboard
Gold medal – first place	2004 Madrid	3 m synchro
Silver medal – second place	2004 Madrid	1 m springboard
Bronze medal – third place	1997 Seville	3 m synchro
Bronze medal – third place	2002 Berlin	3 m synchro
Bronze medal – third place	2006 Budapest	3 m synchro

Nicola Marconi (born 12 November 1978) is an Italian diver.

He was born in Rome. At the 2000 Olympic Games he finished 26th in the 3 metre springboard event and eighth together with Donald Miranda in the synchronized 3 metre springboard event. He later finished 20th in the 3 metre springboard event of the 2004 Olympic Games and 14th in the 3 metre springboard event of the 2008 Olympic Games.

He is a brother of Maria Marconi and Tommaso Marconi.
