= Pavlo Rozenberg =

German diver

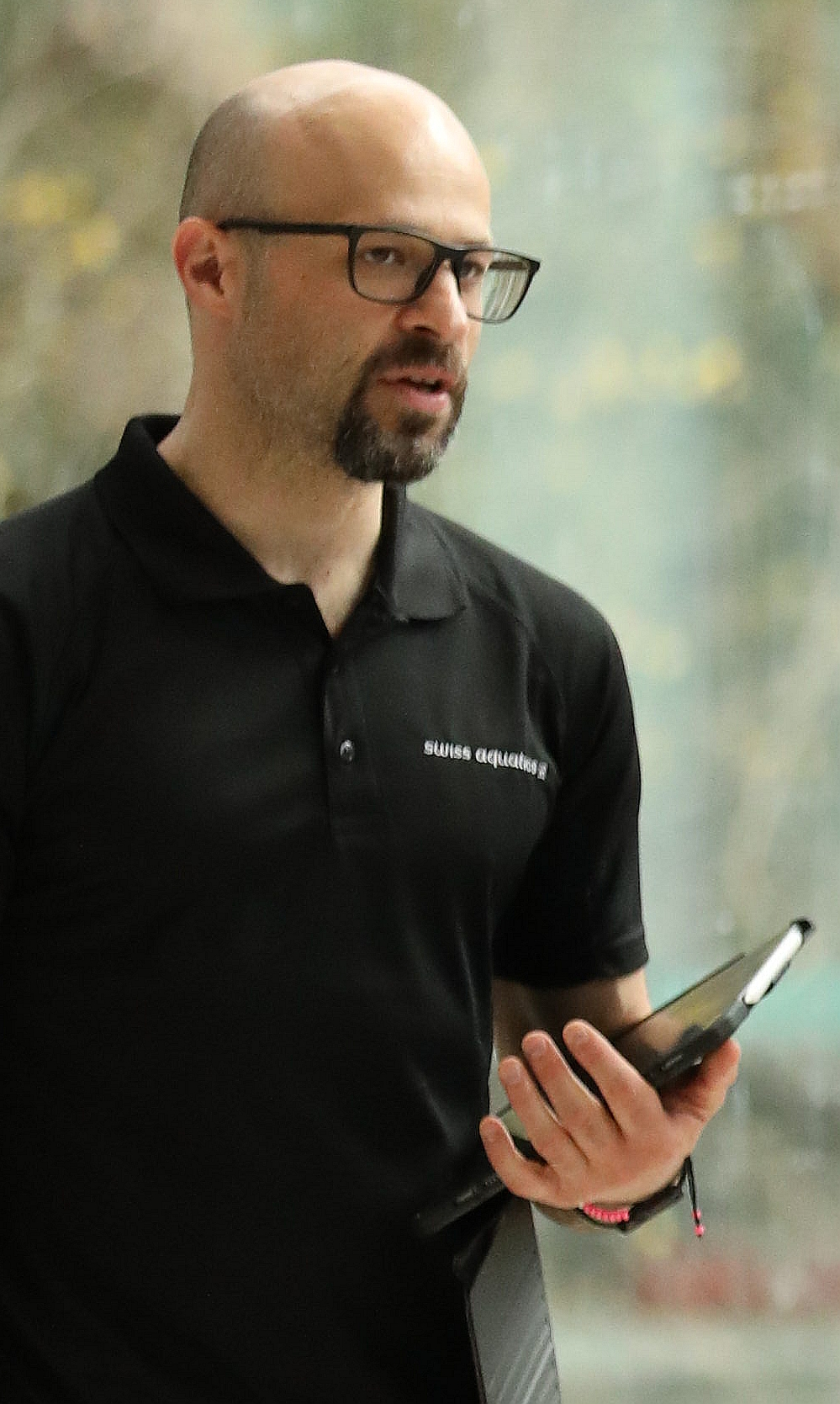
- Rozenberg in 2022

Personal information
- Born: 22 July 1983 (age 42) Vinnytsia, Ukrainian SSR, Soviet Union

Sport
- Sport: Diving
Medal record
Representing Germany
World Championships
Bronze medal – third place	2011 Shanghai	1 m springboard
European Championships
Bronze medal – third place	2009 Turin	1m springboard

Pavlo Rozenberg (Ukrainian: Павло Розенберг; born 22 July 1983) is a German diver. He participates in the 1m and 3m springboard competitions.

He won the bronze medal at the 1 m springboard at the 2001 World Aquatics Championships. He also won the bronze medal at the 2009 European Championships.
