= Stefanos Paparounas =

Greek diver (born 1990)

Personal information
- Born: 22 January 1990 (age 35); Trikala, Greece

Sport
- Sport: Diving

Stefanos Paparounas (Greek: Στέφανος Παπαρούνας, born 22 January 1990) is a Greek diver. He competed in the 3 m springboard event at the 2012 Summer Olympics.
