= Evgeny Kuznetsov (diver) =

Russian diver

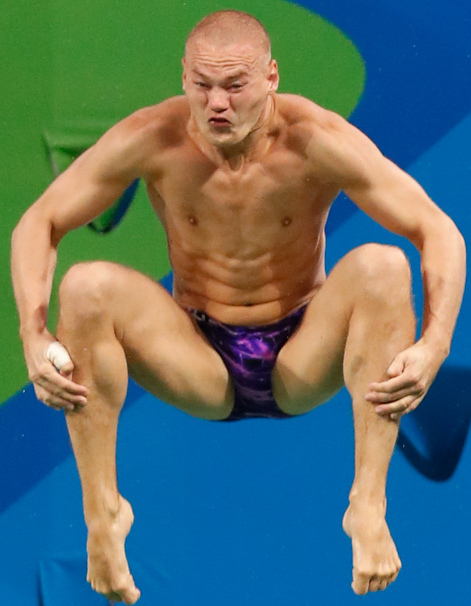
- Kuznetsov at the 2016 Summer Olympics

Personal information
- Full name: Evgeny Vladimirovich Kuznetsov
- Born: 12 April 1990 (age 36) Stavropol, Stavropol Krai, Russian SFSR, Soviet Union
- Height: 5 ft 7 in (170 cm)

Sport
- Country: Russia
- Events: 3m springboard, 3m synchro springboard
- Partner: Ilya Zakharov
Medal record
Men's diving
Representing Neutral Athletes B
European Championships
| Silver medal – second place | 2026 Paris | 3 m synchro |
Representing Russia
Olympic Games
| Silver medal – second place | 2012 London | 3 m synchro |
World Championships
| Gold medal – first place | 2017 Budapest | 3 m synchro |
| Silver medal – second place | 2011 Shanghai | 3 m synchro |
| Silver medal – second place | 2013 Barcelona | 3 m synchro |
| Silver medal – second place | 2013 Barcelona | 3 m springboard |
| Silver medal – second place | 2015 Kazan | 3 m synchro |
| Bronze medal – third place | 2011 Shanghai | 3 m springboard |
European Championships
| Gold medal – first place | 2012 Eindhoven | 3 m synchro |
| Gold medal – first place | 2014 Berlin | 3 m synchro |
| Gold medal – first place | 2016 London | 3 m springboard |
| Gold medal – first place | 2018 Glasgow | 3 m synchro |
| Gold medal – first place | 2020 Budapest | Team |
| Gold medal – first place | 2020 Budapest | 3 m springboard |
| Silver medal – second place | 2012 Eindhoven | 1 m springboard |
| Silver medal – second place | 2014 Berlin | 1 m springboard |
| Silver medal – second place | 2016 London | 3 m synchro |
| Silver medal – second place | 2020 Budapest | 3 m synchro |
| Bronze medal – third place | 2010 Budapest | 3 m springboard |
| Bronze medal – third place | 2018 Glasgow | 3 m springboard |
| Bronze medal – third place | 2018 Glasgow | Team |
European Diving Championships
| Gold medal – first place | 2011 Turin | 1 m springboard |
| Gold medal – first place | 2011 Turin | 3 m synchro |
| Gold medal – first place | 2013 Rostock | 3 m synchro |
| Gold medal – first place | 2015 Rostock | 3 m synchro |
| Gold medal – first place | 2017 Kyiv | 3 m synchro |
| Gold medal – first place | 2019 Kyiv | 3 m springboard |
| Gold medal – first place | 2019 Kyiv | 3 m synchro |
| Silver medal – second place | 2013 Rostock | 3 m springboard |
| Silver medal – second place | 2015 Rostock | 3 m springboard |
| Bronze medal – third place | 2011 Turin | 3 m springboard |
| Bronze medal – third place | 2013 Rostock | Team event |
Summer Universiade
| Gold medal – first place | 2013 Kazan | 3 m springboard |
| Gold medal – first place | 2013 Kazan | 3 m synchro |
| Gold medal – first place | 2017 Taipei | 3 m synchro |
| Gold medal – first place | 2017 Taipei | Team classification |
| Silver medal – second place | 2013 Kazan | Team classification |
| Silver medal – second place | 2017 Taipei | 3 m springboard |
| Bronze medal – third place | 2017 Taipei | 1 m springboard |

Evgeny Vladimirovich Kuznetsov (Russian: Евгений Владимирович Кузнецов; born 12 April 1990) is a Russian diver. At the diving portion of the 2011 World Aquatics Championships he won a bronze in the 3 m springboard, and was the part of the pair who won the silver medal in the 3 m synchronised springboard.

Kuznetsov won a silver medal for his country at the 2012 Summer Olympics, in the 3 m synchronised springboard with Ilya Zakharov. At the 2016 Summer Olympics, Kuznetsov again competed in both the 3 m springboard and the 3 m synchronised springboard diving. At the 2017 World Aquatics Championships in Budapest, Hungary, the Russian won his first gold medal in 3 m synchronized springboard, with his partner Ilya Zakharov.
