= Damien Cely =

French Olympic diver (born 1989)

Personal information
- Nationality: French
- Born: 13 April 1989 (age 35); Sarcelles, France
- Height: 1.63 m (5 ft 4 in)
- Weight: 75 kg (165 lb)

Sport
- Country: France
- Sport: Diver

Damien Cely (born 13 April 1989 in Sarcelles) is a French diver. He competed in the 3 m springboard event at the 2012 Summer Olympics.
