= Javier Illana =

Spanish diver (born 1985)

Personal information
- Born: 12 September 1985 (age 40) Leganés, Madrid, Spain

Sport
- Sport: Diving
Medal record
Representing Spain
European Championships
| Bronze medal – third place | 2010 Budapest | 1m springboard |

Javier Illana García (born 12 September 1985) is a Spanish diver. He competed in the 3 m springboard event at three Summer Olympics: Athens 2004, Beijing 2008 and London 2012, where he reached the final. Illana won the bronze medal in the 1m springboard event at the 2010 European Aquatics Championships. Besides his sport career, he also works as a coach at the Spanish diving TV Show "¡Mira Quien Salta!".
