= Constantin Blaha =

Austrian diver (born 1987)

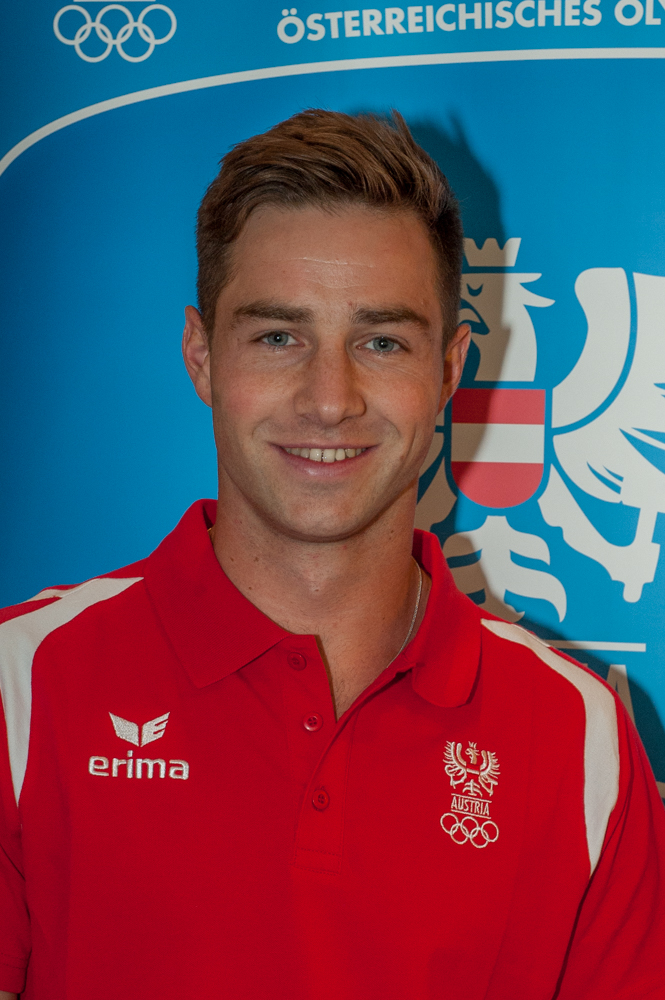

Personal information
- Born: 1 December 1987 (age 38) Vienna, Austria
- Height: 178 cm (5 ft 10 in)
- Weight: 76 kg (168 lb)

Sport
- Country: Austria
- Sport: Diving
- Event(s): 3 m springboard 1 m springboard
- Club: Schwimm-Union Wien
Medal record
European Championships
| Bronze medal – third place | 2016 London | 1 m springboard |

Constantin Blaha (born 1 December 1987) is an Austrian diver who specializes in the 1 m and 3 m springboard events.

== Career ==
He has represented his country during the 2008 Summer Olympics in Beijing where he failed to advance to the semifinal after classifying 22nd in the preliminary round of the men's 3 metre springboard.

He has also participated in both the 2009 and 2011 editions of the World Aquatics Championships: he was eliminated both times in the preliminary of the men's 3 m springboard, classifying 25th in 2009 and 19th in 2011, and also in the men's 1 m springboard, ranking 14th and 30th respectively.

He participated in the 2013 World Aquatics Championships in Barcelona, Spain and ranked 5th and 9th in Men's 1 and 3 metre springboard, respectively.

Blaha once again represented Austria in the 2016 Summer Olympics in Rio de Janeiro, Brazil. He failed to qualify for the semifinals, placing 27th
