= Matthieu Rosset =

French diver (born 1990)

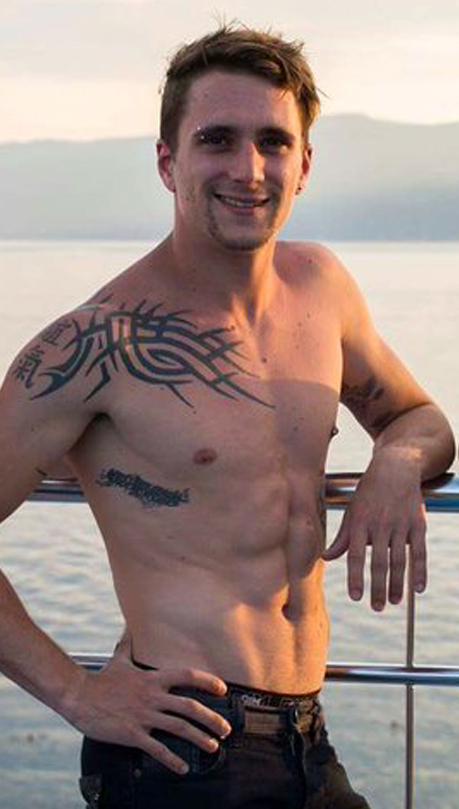

Personal information
- Born: 26 May 1990 (age 36) Lyon, France

Sport
- Sport: Diving
Medal record
Representing France
World Championships
Gold medal – first place	2017 Budapest	Team event
European Championships
Gold medal – first place	2012 Debrecen	3 m springboard
Gold medal – first place	2012 Debrecen	Team event
Bronze medal – third place	2012 Debrecen	1 m springboard
Bronze medal – third place	2014 Berlin	1 m springboard

Matthieu Rosset (born 26 May 1990) is a French diver. He competed in the 3 m springboard event at the 2012 and 2016 Summer Olympics. He has won a gold medal (2012 3 m springboard) and three bronze medals (1 m springboard and 3m synchronized springboard in 2011 and 1 m springboard in 2012) at the European Championships.

In 2017, Rosset won the gold medal at the World Aquatics Championships with his partner Laura Marino in the team event with a total of 406.40 points.
