= Diving at the 2015 World Aquatics Championships – Women's synchronized 3 metre springboard =

Women's synchronized 3 metre springboard at the 2015 World Aquatics Championships
- Dates: 25 July
- Competitors: 38 from 19 nations
- Winning points: 351.30

Medalists
gold medal	Shi Tingmao; Wu Minxia	China
silver medal	Jennifer Abel; Pamela Ware	Canada
bronze medal	Samantha Mills; Esther Qin	Australia

The Women's synchronized 3 metre springboard competition of the diving events at the 2015 World Aquatics Championships was held on 25 July 2015.

== Results ==
The preliminary round was held at 10:00. The final was held at 19:30.

Green denotes finalists

Rank	Nation	Divers	Preliminary		Final	
Rank	Nation	Divers	Points	Rank	Points	Rank
1st place, gold medalist(s)	China	Shi Tingmao; Wu Minxia	312.90	1	351.30	1
2nd place, silver medalist(s)	Canada	Jennifer Abel; Pamela Ware	302.01	2	319.47	2
3rd place, bronze medalist(s)	Australia	Samantha Mills; Esther Qin	291.90	3	304.20	3
4	Ukraine	Anastasiia Nedobiga; Viktoriya Kesar	281.49	6	302.85	4
5	Italy	Tania Cagnotto; Francesca Dallapé	280.77	7	302.43	5
6	Russia	Nadezhda Bazhina; Kristina Ilinykh	282.60	5	297.30	6
7	Mexico	Arantxa Chávez; Melany Hernández	273.93	10	296.19	7
8	Malaysia	Ng Yan Yee; Nur Dhabitah Sabri	274.11	9	294.66	8
9	United States	Abigail Johnston; Laura Ryan	275.40	8	292.50	9
10	Great Britain	Alicia Blagg; Rebecca Gallantree	287.40	4	286.86	10
11	Germany	Tina Punzel; Nora Subschinski	265.50	12	278.40	11
12	Netherlands	Uschi Freitag; Inge Jansen	273.60	11	276.90	12
13	South Korea	Kim Su-ji; Kim Na-mi	252.66	13		
14	Puerto Rico	Jeniffer Fernández; Luisa Jiménez	249.24	14		
15	South Africa	Nicole Gillis; Julia Vincent	237.93	15		
16	Finland	Taina Karvonen; Iira Laatunen	230.88	16		
17	Hungary	Flóra Gondos; Villő Kormos	229.92	17		
18	Brazil	Tammy Takagi; Juliana Veloso	228.87	18		
19	Croatia	Maja Borić; Marcela Marić	223.89	19		
