= Diving at the 2012 European Aquatics Championships – Women's 3 m springboard =

The women's 3 m springboard competition of the diving events at the 2012 European Aquatics Championships was held on May 19.

== Medalists ==
Gold	Silver	Bronze
Anna Lindberg; Sweden	Uschi Freitag; Germany	Olena Fedorova; Ukraine

== Results ==
The preliminary round was held at 11:00 local time. The final was held at 17:30.

Green denotes finalists

Rank	Diver	Nationality	Preliminary		Final	
Rank	Diver	Nationality	Points	Rank	Points	Rank
1st place, gold medalist(s)	Anna Lindberg	Sweden	312.60	2	342.75	1
2nd place, silver medalist(s)	Uschi Freitag	Germany	294.45	4	321.40	2
3rd place, bronze medalist(s)	Olena Fedorova	Ukraine	277.80	8	315.00	3
4	Tania Cagnotto	Italy	326.05	1	307.65	4
5	Anastasia Pozdniakova	Russia	275.70	9	304.65	5
6	Nora Subschinski	Germany	304.35	3	298.20	6
7	Rebecca Gallantree	Great Britain	280.95	6	286.40	7
8	Francesca Dallapé	Italy	268.50	12	281.20	8
9	Hannah Starling	Great Britain	274.50	10	280.70	9
10	Nòra Barta	Hungary	270.10	11	268.45	10
11	Inge Jansen	Netherlands	288.80	5	263.55	11
12	Marion Farissier	France	279.00	7	259.70	12
13	Hanna Pysmenska	Ukraine	265.50	13		
14	Nadezhda Bazhina	Russia	264.35	14		
15	Ioulianna Banousi	Greece	250.35	15		
16	Daniella Nero	Sweden	244.85	16		
17	Taina Karvonen	Finland	233.60	17		
18	Flóra Gondos	Hungary	230.35	18		
19	Leyre Eizaguirre	Spain	225.15	19		
20	Ksenia Kondrashenkova	Poland	222.30	20		
21	Magdalena Chlanda	Poland	217.85	21		
22	Alena Khamulkina	Belarus	217.50	22		
23	Sophie Somloi	Austria	204.90	23		
24	Eleni Katsouli	Greece	199.10	24		
