= Diving at the 2012 European Aquatics Championships – Women's 1 m springboard =

The women's 1 m springboard competition of the diving events at the 2012 European Aquatics Championships was held on May 18.

== Medalists ==
Gold	Silver	Bronze
Anna Lindberg; Sweden	Tania Cagnotto; Italy	Nadezhda Bazhina; Russia

== Results ==
The preliminary round was held at 11:00 local time. The final was held at 17:30.

Green denotes finalists

Rank	Diver	Nationality	Preliminary		Final	
Rank	Diver	Nationality	Points	Rank	Points	Rank
1st place, gold medalist(s)	Anna Lindberg	Sweden	294.15	1	301.35	1
2nd place, silver medalist(s)	Tania Cagnotto	Italy	284.45	2	281.30	2
3rd place, bronze medalist(s)	Nadezhda Bazhina	Russia	264.70	3	275.15	3
4	Uschi Freitag	Germany	246.75	6	269.95	4
5	Anastasia Pozdniakova	Russia	257.85	4	259.45	5
6	Katja Dieckow	Germany	243.15	7	254.70	6
7	Francesca Dallapé	Italy	242.00	8	251.50	7
8	Inge Jansen	Netherlands	232.15	12	247.45	8
9	Marion Farissier	France	236.95	10	242.75	9
10	Rhea Gayle	Great Britain	236.10	11	242.70	10
11	Alicia Blagg	Great Britain	255.95	5	235.05	11
12	Hanna Pysmenska	Ukraine	237.75	9	229.95	12
13	Sophie Somloi	Austria	229.50	13		
14	Nòra Barta	Hungary	222.80	14		
15	Iira Laatunen	Finland	222.00	15		
16	Taina Karvonen	Finland	214.80	16		
17	Ksenia Kondrashenkova	Belarus	211.55	17		
18	Alena Khamulkina	Belarus	209.90	18		
19	Jennifer Granath	Sweden	209.60	19		
20	Patrycja Pyrzak	Poland	204.85	20		
21	Leyre Eizaguirre	Spain	204.60	21		
22	Magdalena Chlanda	Poland	199.20	22		
23	Celine van Duijn	Netherlands	192.65	23		
