= Diving at the 2014 European Aquatics Championships – Women's 1 m springboard =

Women's 1 m springboard at the Diving at the 2014 European Aquatics Championships
- Dates: 20 August
- Competitors: 25 from 15 nations
- Winning points: 289.30

Medalists
gold medal	Tania Cagnotto	Italy
silver medal	Kristina Ilinykh	Russia
bronze medal	Tina Punzel	Germany

The Women's 1 m springboard competition of the 2014 European Aquatics Championships was held on 20 August.

== Results ==
The preliminary round was held at 10:00 and the final at 14:00.

Green denotes finalists

Rank	Diver	Nationality	Preliminary		Final	
Rank	Diver	Nationality	Points	Rank	Points	Rank
1st place, gold medalist(s)	Tania Cagnotto	Italy	292.90	1	289.30	1
2nd place, silver medalist(s)	Kristina Ilinykh	Russia	273.05	3	288.55	2
3rd place, bronze medalist(s)	Tina Punzel	Germany	263.90	4	286.70	3
4	Maria Marconi	Italy	246.05	6	285.50	4
5	Olena Fedorova	Ukraine	252.05	5	265.95	5
6	Uschi Freitag	Netherlands	245.95	7	263.75	6
7	Nadezhda Bazhina	Russia	280.15	2	258.15	7
8	Hannah Starling	Great Britain	236.00	10	253.10	8
9	Iira Laatunen	Finland	244.20	8	246.10	9
10	Celine van Duijn	Netherlands	231.65	11	238.85	10
11	Hanna Pysmenska	Ukraine	230.65	12	237.70	11
12	Tiia Kivela	Finland	236.20	9	223.55	12
13	Alicia Blagg	Great Britain	229.10	13		
14	Nora Subschinski	Germany	227.70	14		
15	Alena Khamulkina	Belarus	227.40	15		
16	Jessica Favre	Switzerland	220.15	16		
17	Daniella Nero	Sweden	220.10	17		
18	Marion Farissier	France	217.75	18		
19	Anca Serb	Romania	211.15	19		
20	Maxine Eouzan	France	209.80	20		
21	Ioulianna Banousi	Greece	209.20	21		
22	Rocio Velázquez	Spain	204.00	22		
23	Eleni Katsouli	Greece	202.10	23		
24	Indrė Girdauskaitė	Lithuania	179.90	24		
25	Modesta Kaminskytė	Lithuania	134.65	25		
