= Diving at the 2014 European Aquatics Championships – Women's 3 m springboard =

Women's 3 m springboard at the Diving at the 2014 European Aquatics Championships
- Dates: 24 August
- Competitors: 24 from 16 nations
- Winning points: 322.80

Medalists
gold medal	Nadezhda Bazhina	Russia
silver medal	Tania Cagnotto	Italy
bronze medal	Nora Subschinski	Germany

The Women's 3 m springboard competition of the 2014 European Aquatics Championships was held on 24 August.

== Results ==
The preliminary round was held at 12:00 and the final at 18:00.

Green denotes finalists

Rank	Diver	Nationality	Preliminary		Final	
Rank	Diver	Nationality	Points	Rank	Points	Rank
1st place, gold medalist(s)	Nadezhda Bazhina	Russia	309.45	3	322.80	1
2nd place, silver medalist(s)	Tania Cagnotto	Italy	321.45	1	318.25	2
3rd place, bronze medalist(s)	Nora Subschinski	Germany	293.85	7	317.90	3
4	Tina Punzel	Germany	273.60	10	314.20	4
5	Uschi Freitag	Netherlands	298.80	5	306.45	5
6	Viktoriya Kesar	Ukraine	311.00	2	302.20	6
7	Hannah Starling	Great Britain	280.75	9	297.40	7
8	Anastasiya Nedobiga	Ukraine	286.80	8	294.70	8
9	Inge Jansen	Netherlands	300.00	4	288.30	9
10	Alena Khamulkina	Belarus	263.20	12	287.00	10
11	Alicia Blagg	Great Britain	295.20	6	286.50	11
12	Daniella Nero	Sweden	270.75	11	265.40	12
13	Maria Marconi	Italy	252.55	13		
14	Maxine Eouzan	France	246.85	14		
15	Anca Serb	Romania	242.50	15		
16	Jessica Favre	Switzerland	241.35	16		
17	Marion Farissier	France	240.30	17		
18	Rocio Velázquez	Spain	240.00	18		
19	Flóra Gondos	Hungary	237.30	19		
20	Kristina Ilinykh	Russia	230.50	20		
21	Taina Karvonen	Finland	229.25	21		
22	Ioulianna Banousi	Greece	222.10	22		
23	Indrė Girdauskaitė	Lithuania	208.95	23		
24	Iira Laatunen	Finland	194.10	24		
