= Diving at the 2012 Summer Olympics – Women's 3 metre springboard =

Women's 3 metre springboard at the Games of the XXX Olympiad
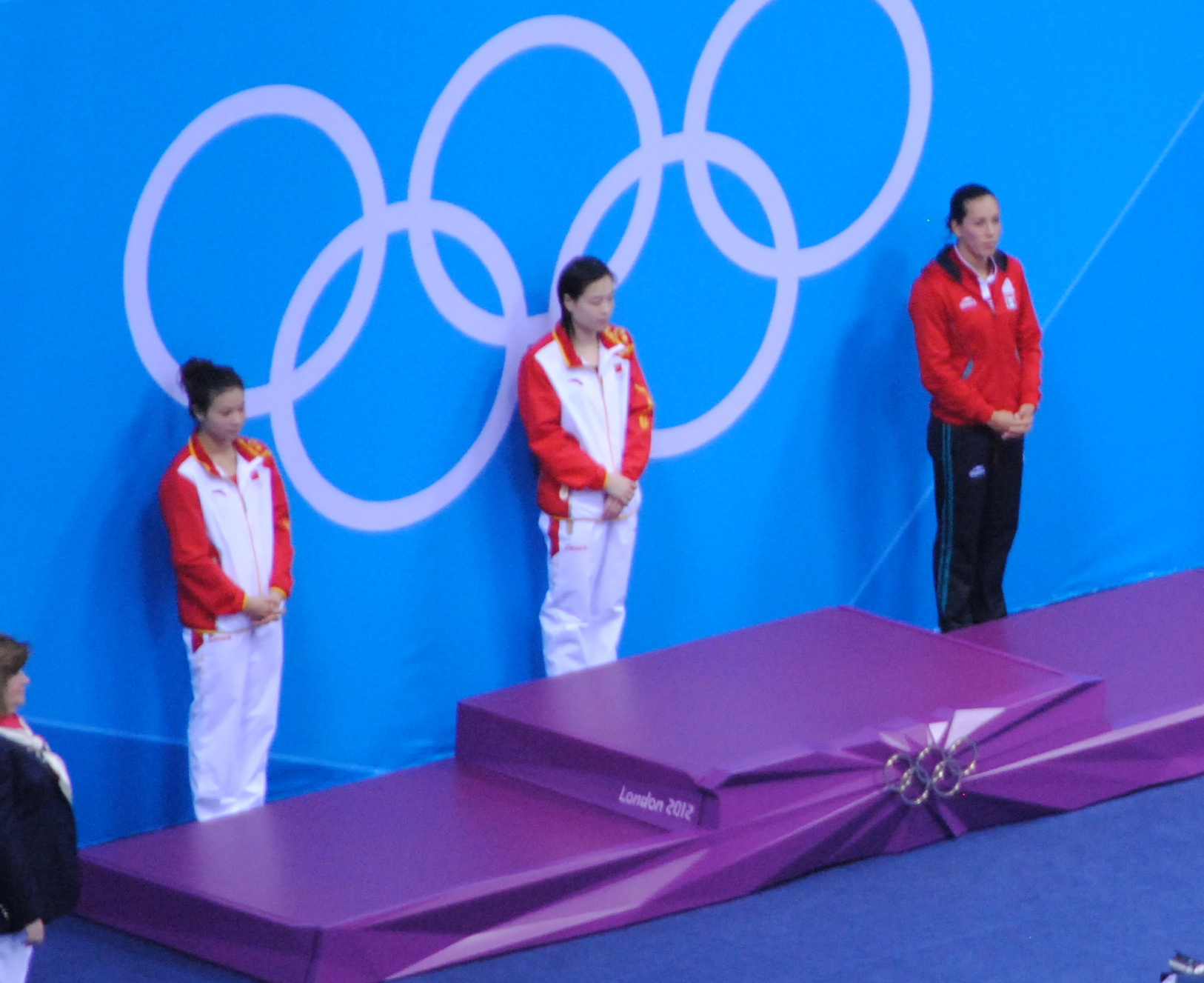
- Women's 3 metre springboard victory ceremony
- Venue: Aquatics Centre
- Date: 3–5 August
- Competitors: 30 from 17 nations

Medalists
1st place, gold medalist(s)		Wu Minxia	China
2nd place, silver medalist(s)		He Zi	China
3rd place, bronze medalist(s)		Laura Sánchez	Mexico

The women's 3 metre springboard diving competition at the 2012 Olympic Games in London took place from 3 to 5 August at the Aquatics Centre within the Olympic Park.

China's Wu Minxia won the gold medal and He Zi, also from China, took silver. Laura Sánchez of Mexico won the bronze.

== Format ==
The competition was held in three rounds:

- Preliminary round: All 30 divers perform five dives; the top 18 divers advance to the semi-final.
- Semi-final: The 18 divers perform five dives; the scores of the qualifications are erased and the top 12 divers advance to the final.
- Final: The 12 divers perform five dives; the semi-final scores are erased and the top three divers win the gold, silver and bronze medals accordingly.

== Schedule ==
All times are British Summer Time (UTC+1)

Date	Time	Round
Friday 3 August 2012	14:30	Preliminary
Saturday 4 August 2012	14:30	Semi-final
Sunday 5 August 2012	19:00	Final

== Results ==
Rank	Diver	Nation	Preliminary		Semi-final		Final					
Rank	Diver	Nation	Points	Rank	Points	Rank	Dive 1	Dive 2	Dive 3	Dive 4	Dive 5	Total points
1st place, gold medalist(s)	Wu Minxia	China	387.75	1	394.40	1	79.50	79.75	85.25	84.00	85.50	414.00
2nd place, silver medalist(s)	He Zi	China	363.85	2	354.50	3	76.50	83.70	78.00	76.50	64.50	379.20
3rd place, bronze medalist(s)	Laura Sánchez	Mexico	320.15	9	336.50	7	70.50	67.50	75.00	74.40	75.00	362.40
4	Tania Cagnotto	Italy	349.80	3	362.10	2	76.50	69.00	68.20	72.00	76.50	362.20
5	Sharleen Stratton	Australia	342.70	5	327.60	9	70.5	67.50	66.65	69.00	72.00	345.65
6	Jennifer Abel	Canada	344.15	4	353.25	4	66.00	77.50	55.50	72.00	72.00	343.00
7	Cassidy Krug	United States	320.10	10	345.60	5	72.00	72.85	70.50	72.00	55.50	342.85
8	Christina Loukas	United States	330.45	7	339.75	6	69.00	64.50	66.00	65.10	67.50	332.10
9	Olena Fedorova	Ukraine	308.70	14	314.70	12	65.80	63.00	63.00	61.50	64.50	317.80
10	Anna Lindberg	Sweden	318.60	11	319.80	10	63.00	55.80	67.50	67.50	63.00	316.80
11	Jaele Patrick	Australia	289.65	18	315.60	11	67.50	63.00	60.00	58.90	60.00	309.40
12	Emilie Heymans	Canada	337.20	6	331.35	8	67.50	46.20	72.00	58.50	51.00	295.20
13	Hannah Starling	Great Britain	298.95	17	313.95	13	Did not advance					
14	Nora Subschinski	Germany	311.70	12	313.20	14	Did not advance					
15	Francesca Dallapé	Italy	311.25	13	312.60	15	Did not advance					
16	Katja Dieckow	Germany	303.90	15	312.50	16	Did not advance					
17	Nadezhda Bazhina	Russia	325.00	8	310.70	17	Did not advance					
18	Rebecca Gallantree	Great Britain	299.25	16	267.10	18	Did not advance					
19	Anastasia Pozdniakova	Russia	286.50	19	Did not advance							
20	Cheong Jun Hoong	Malaysia	272.45	20	Did not advance							
21	Hanna Pysmenska	Ukraine	271.50	21	Did not advance							
22	Flóra Gondos	Hungary	266.45	22	Did not advance							
23	Jocelyn Castillo	Venezuela	266.00	23	Did not advance							
24	Ng Yan Yee	Malaysia	257.85	24	Did not advance							
25	Nóra Barta	Hungary	257.70	25	Did not advance							
26	Fanny Bouvet	France	257.10	26	Did not advance							
27	Marion Farissier	France	248.70	27	Did not advance							
28	Juliana Veloso	Brazil	241.15	28	Did not advance							
29	Arantxa Chávez	Mexico	225.45	29	Did not advance							
30	Jenifer Benítez	Spain	224.60	30	Did not advance							
