= 2015 European Diving Championships – Women's 3 metre synchro springboard =

In the 2015 European Diving Championships, the women's 3 metre synchro springboard event, was hosted in Rostock, Germany, and was won by the Italian team of Tania Cagnotto and Francesca Dallapé.

== Medalists ==
| Gold | Silver | Bronze |
|---|---|---|
| Tania Cagnotto; Francesca Dallapé; Italy | Tina Punzel; Nora Subschinski; Germany | Nadezhda Bazhina; Kristina Ilinykh; Germany |

== Results ==
Green denotes finalists

| Rank | Diver | Nationality | Preliminary | | Final | |
| Rank | Diver | Nationality | Points | Rank | Points | Rank |
|---|---|---|---|---|---|---|
| 1st place, gold medalist(s) | Tania Cagnotto; Francesca Dallapé | Italy | 308,49 | 1 | 313,08 | 1 |
| 2nd place, silver medalist(s) | Tina Punzel; Nora Subschinski | Germany | 297,30 | 3 | 302,70 | 2 |
| 3rd place, bronze medalist(s) | Nadezhda Bazhina; Kristina Ilinykh | Russia | 300,30 | 2 | 298,50 | 3 |
| 4 | Hanna Pysmenska; Olena Fedorova | Ukraine | 280,20 | 4 | 290,10 | 4 |
| 5 | Inge Jansen; Uschi Freitag | Netherlands | 279,00 | 5 | 282,00 | 5 |
| 6 | Iira Laatunen; Taina Karvonen | Finland | 239,94 | 7 | 265,32 | 6 |
| 7 | Villő Kormos; Flóra Gondos | Hungary | 269,94 | 6 | 255,93 | 7 |
