= Diving at the 2012 European Aquatics Championships – Women's 3 m synchro springboard =

The women's 3 m springboard synchro competition of the diving events at the 2012 European Aquatics Championships was held on 20 May.

== Medalists ==
Gold	Silver	Bronze
Francesca Dallapé; Tania Cagnotto; Italy	Hanna Pysmenska; Olena Fedorova; Ukraine	Katja Dieckow; Uschi Freitag; Germany

== Results ==
The preliminary round was held at 11:00 local time. The final was held at 17:30.

Rank	Diver	Nationality	Preliminary		Final	
Rank	Diver	Nationality	Points	Rank	Points	Rank
1st place, gold medalist(s)	Francesca Dallapé; Tania Cagnotto	Italy	299.40	3	325.50	1
2nd place, silver medalist(s)	Hanna Pysmenska; Olena Fedorova	Ukraine	290.70	5	302.10	2
3rd place, bronze medalist(s)	Katja Dieckow; Uschi Freitag	Germany	302.70	1	296.70	3
4	Anastasia Pozdniakova; Svetlana Filippova	Russia	293.52	4	295.80	4
5	Alicia Blagg; Rebecca Gallantree	Great Britain	302.40	2	258.90	5
6	Flóra Gondos; Zsófia Reisinger	Hungary	249.96	8	251.07	6
7	Daniella Nero; Julia Lönnegren	Sweden	258.42	6	244.86	7
8	Inge Jansen; Celine van Duijn	Netherlands	256.32	7	242.22	8
9	Eleni Katsouli; Ioulianna Banousi	Greece	239.43	9		
9	Taina Karvonen; Iira Laatunen	Finland	239.43	9		
11	Magdalena Chlanda; Patrycja Pyrzak	Poland	226.26	11		
