= Diving at the 2016 European Aquatics Championships – Women's 3 m springboard =

Women's 3 m springboard at the 2016 European Aquatics Championships
- Dates: 14 May
- Competitors: 26 from 16 nations
- Winning points: 360.60

Medalists
gold medal	Tania Cagnotto	Italy
silver medal	Uschi Freitag	Netherlands
bronze medal	Grace Reid	Great Britain

The Women's 3 m springboard competition of the 2016 European Aquatics Championships was held on 14 May 2016.

== Results ==
The preliminary round was held at 10:00. The final was held at 15:30.

Green denotes finalists

Rank	Diver	Nationality	Preliminary		Final	
Rank	Diver	Nationality	Points	Rank	Points	Rank
1st place, gold medalist(s)	Tania Cagnotto	Italy	315.45	2	360.60	1
2nd place, silver medalist(s)	Uschi Freitag	Netherlands	303.35	4	330.60	2
3rd place, bronze medalist(s)	Grace Reid	Great Britain	300.95	5	328.55	3
4	Rebecca Gallantree	Great Britain	306.60	3	323.25	4
5	Olena Fedorova	Ukraine	289.80	7	317.10	5
6	Inge Jansen	Netherlands	291.40	6	309.25	6
7	Nora Subschinski	Germany	279.20	10	303.30	7
8	Tina Punzel	Germany	286.20	8	291.25	8
9	Alena Khamulkina	Belarus	285.00	9	269.50	9
10	Anastasiia Nedobiga	Ukraine	326.25	1	269.45	10
11	Francesca Dallapé	Italy	261.30	11	262.40	11
12	Rocío Velázquez	Spain	255.80	12	224.30	12
13	Emma Gorebrant	Sweden	255.25	13		
14	Daniella Nero	Sweden	253.35	14		
15	Marcela Marić	Croatia	245.70	15		
16	Diana Chaplieva	Russia	245.55	16		
17	Clara Della Vedova	France	243.85	17		
18	Kristina Ilinykh	Russia	242.15	18		
19	Natasha MacManus	Ireland	235.80	19		
20	Madeline Coquoz	Switzerland	232.35	20		
21	Genevieve Green	Lithuania	228.65	21		
22	Jessica Favre	Switzerland	224.50	22		
23	Anne Tuxen	Norway	210.65	23		
24	Maja Borić	Croatia	208.50	24		
25	Taina Karvonen	Finland	193.25	25		
26	Indrė Girdauskaitė	Lithuania	179.05	26		
