= 2015 European Diving Championships – Women's 3 metre springboard =

Sports event

In the women's 3-metre springboard event at the 2015 European Diving Championships, there were 20 entrants in the preliminary round and 12 in the final round. The gold medal winner was Tania Cagnotto of Italy.

== Medalists ==
| Gold | Silver | Bronze |
|---|---|---|
| Tania Cagnotto; Italy | Kristina Ilinykh; Russia | Tina Punzel; Germany |

== Results ==
Green denotes finalists

| Rank | Diver | Nationality | Preliminary | | Final | |
| Rank | Diver | Nationality | Points | Rank | Points | Rank |
|---|---|---|---|---|---|---|
| 1st place, gold medalist(s) | Tania Cagnotto | Italy | 300,15 | 1 | 350,20 | 1 |
| 2nd place, silver medalist(s) | Kristina Ilinykh | Russia | 290,30 | 3 | 334,15 | 2 |
| 3rd place, bronze medalist(s) | Tina Punzel | Germany | 285,60 | 6 | 330,90 | 3 |
| 4 | Francesca Dallape' | Italy | 264,25 | 9 | 323,15 | 4 |
| 5 | Uschi Freitag | Netherlands | 289,95 | 4 | 304,95 | 5 |
| 6 | Nadezhda Bazhina | Russia | 256,50 | 11 | 298,55 | 6 |
| 7 | Inge Jansen | Netherlands | 287,10 | 5 | 291,30 | 7 |
| 8 | Anastasiia Nedobiga | Ukraine | 267,70 | 8 | 277,95 | 8 |
| 9 | Alicia Blagg | United Kingdom | 254,75 | 12 | 275,50 | 9 |
| 10 | Anna Pysmenska | Ukraine | 269,85 | 7 | 271,30 | 10 |
| 11 | Grace Reid | United Kingdom | 290,70 | 2 | 264,30 | 11 |
| 12 | Jessica Favre | Switzerland | 258,00 | 10 | 239,60 | 12 |
| 13 | Nora Subschinski | Germany | 246,45 | 13 | | |
| 14 | Rocío Velázquez | Spain | 239,90 | 14 | | |
| 15 | Daniella Nero | Sweden | 229,30 | 15 | | |
| 16 | Taina Karvonen | Finland | 224,50 | 16 | | |
| 17 | Anca Serb | Romania | 224,20 | 17 | | |
| 18 | Flora Piroska Gondos | Hungary | 217,90 | 18 | | |
| 19 | Clara Della Vedova | France | 211,85 | 19 | | |
| 20 | Eleni Katsouli | Greece | 202,65 | 20 | | |
