= Diving at the 2014 European Aquatics Championships – Women's 3 m synchro springboard =

Women's 3 m synchro springboard at the Diving at the 2014 European Aquatics Championships
- Dates: 23 August
- Competitors: 18 from 9 nations
- Winning points: 328.50

Medalists
gold medal	Tania Cagnotto; Francesca Dallapé	Italy
silver medal	Tina Punzel; Nora Subschinski	Germany
bronze medal	Olena Fedorova; Hanna Pysmenska	Ukraine

The Women's 3 m synchro springboard competition of the 2014 European Aquatics Championships was held on 23 August.

== Results ==
The preliminary round was held at 12:00 and the final at 18:00.

Green denotes finalists

Rank	Diver	Nationality	Preliminary		Final	
Rank	Diver	Nationality	Points	Rank	Points	Rank
1st place, gold medalist(s)	Tania Cagnotto; Francesca Dallapé	Italy	306.60	1	328.50	1
2nd place, silver medalist(s)	Tina Punzel; Nora Subschinski	Germany	289.50	4	313.50	2
3rd place, bronze medalist(s)	Olena Fedorova; Hanna Pysmenska	Ukraine	298.80	2	307.20	3
4	Diana Chaplieva; Nadezhda Bazhina	Russia	286.50	5	306.00	4
5	Inge Jansen; Uschi Freitag	Netherlands	278.10	6	302.70	5
6	Hannah Starling; Alicia Blagg	Great Britain	291.27	3	297.87	6
7	Iira Laatunen; Taina Karvonen	Finland	250.20	8	253.59	7
7	Villő Kormos; Flóra Gondos	Hungary	252.06	7	253.59	7
9	Ioulianna Banousi; Eleni Katsouli	Greece	230.88	9		
