= Diving at the 2009 World Aquatics Championships – Women's synchronized 3 metre springboard =

== Results ==
Green denotes finalists

Rank	Diver	Nationality	Preliminary		Final	
Rank	Diver	Nationality	Points	Rank	Points	Rank
1st place, gold medalist(s)	Guo Jingjing; Wu Minxia	China	342.90	1	348.00	1
2nd place, silver medalist(s)	Tania Cagnotto; Francesca Dallapè	Italy	316.20	2	329.70	2
3rd place, bronze medalist(s)	Yuliya Pakhalina; Anastasia Pozdniakova	Russia	305.49	3	310.80	3
4	Jennifer Abel; Melanie Rinaldi	Canada	302.70	5	309.90	4
5	Briony Cole; Sharleen Stratton	Australia	301.74	6	309.18	5
6	Kelci Bryant; Ariel Rittenhouse	United States	293.40	7	305.10	6
7	Paola Espinosa; Laura Sánchez	Mexico	304.50	4	304.50	7
8	Mai Nakagawa; Sayaka Shibusawa	Japan	282.96	9	291.45	8
9	Katja Dieckow; Nora Subschinski	Germany	285.90	8	282.30	9
10	Olena Fedorova; Alevtyna Korolyova	Ukraine	281.73	10	263.67	10
11	Raisa Geurtsen; Iris Janssen	Netherlands	257.16	11	262.44	11
12	Piroska Flóra Gondos; Zsófia Reisinger	Hungary	234.96	12	245.19	12
13	Choi Sut Ian; Choi Sut Kuan	Macau	228.96	13		
