= Cagnotto =

Cagnotto is an Italian surname. Notable people with the surname include:

- Giorgio Cagnotto (born 1947), Italian Olympic diver
- Tania Cagnotto (born 1985), Italian Olympic diver, daughter of Giorgio
