= Diving at the 2016 European Aquatics Championships – Women's 3 m synchro springboard =

Women's 3 m synchro springboard at the 2016 European Aquatics Championships
- Dates: 15 May
- Competitors: 16 from 8 nations
- Teams: 8
- Winning points: 327.81

Medalists
gold medal	Tania Cagnotto; Francesca Dallapé	Italy
silver medal	Alicia Blagg; Rebecca Gallantree	Great Britain
bronze medal	Nadezhda Bazhina; Kristina Ilinykh	Russia

The Women's 3 m synchro springboard competition of the 2016 European Aquatics Championships was held on 15 May 2016.

== Results ==
The final was held at 17:13.

Rank	Diver	Nationality	
Rank	Diver	Nationality	Points
1st place, gold medalist(s)	Tania Cagnotto; Francesca Dallapé	Italy	327.81
2nd place, silver medalist(s)	Alicia Blagg; Rebecca Gallantree	Great Britain	319.32
3rd place, bronze medalist(s)	Nadezhda Bazhina; Kristina Ilinykh	Russia	304.20
4	Inge Jansen; Uschi Freitag	Netherlands	293.70
5	Tina Punzel; Nora Subschinski	Germany	292.17
6	Anastasiia Nedobiga; Viktoriya Kesar	Ukraine	289.23
7	Vivian Barth; Madeline Coquoz	Switzerland	257.58
8	Iira Laatunen; Taina Karvonen	Finland	241.41
