= Diving at the 2016 Summer Olympics – Women's synchronized 3 metre springboard =

Women's synchronised 3 metre springboard at the Games of the XXXI Olympiad
- Venue: Maria Lenk Aquatic Center
- Date: 7 August 2016
- Competitors: 16 from 8 nations
- Teams: 8 pairs
- Winning total: 345.60 points

Medalists
1st place, gold medalist(s)		Shi Tingmao; Wu Minxia	China
2nd place, silver medalist(s)		Tania Cagnotto; Francesca Dallapé	Italy
3rd place, bronze medalist(s)		Maddison Keeney; Anabelle Smith	Australia

The women's synchronised 3 metre springboard diving competition at the 2016 Summer Olympics in Rio de Janeiro took place on 7 August at the Maria Lenk Aquatic Center in Barra da Tijuca.

== Competition format ==
The competition was held in a single stage with each two-person team making five rounds of dives. There were eleven judges scoring each dive made by each team - three judges for each diver; six in total, and five judges for synchronisation. Only the middle score counted for each diver, with the middle three counting for synchronisation. These five scores were averaged, multiplied by 3, and multiplied by the dive's degree of difficulty to give a total dive score. The scores for each of the five dives were summed to give a final score.

== Schedule ==
Times are Brasília time, BRT (UTC−03:00)

Date	Time	Round
Sunday 7 Aug 2016	15:00	Final

== Results ==
Rank	Divers	Dives					Total
Rank	Divers	1	2	3	4	5	Total
1st place, gold medalist(s)	China; Shi Tingmao; Wu Minxia	55.80	52.20	76.50	80.10	81.00	345.60
2nd place, silver medalist(s)	Italy; Tania Cagnotto; Francesca Dallapé	51.60	50.40	71.10	66.03	74.70	313.83
3rd place, bronze medalist(s)	Australia; Maddison Keeney; Anabelle Smith	48.00	42.00	70.20	67.89	71.10	299.19
4	Canada; Jennifer Abel; Pamela Ware	46.80	45.00	70.20	68.82	67.50	298.32
5	Malaysia; Cheong Jun Hoong; Nur Dhabitah Sabri	49.80	47.40	71.10	60.30	64.80	293.40
6	Great Britain; Alicia Blagg; Rebecca Gallantree	49.80	47.40	64.80	64.80	66.03	292.83
7	Germany; Tina Punzel; Nora Subschinski	48.00	48.00	60.30	60.45	67.50	284.25
8	Brazil; Tammy Takagi; Juliana Veloso	45.00	46.20	59.40	47.70	60.45	258.75
