= Diving at the 2012 Summer Olympics – Women's synchronized 3 metre springboard =

Coordinates: 51°32′24.6″N 0°0′38″W

Women's synchronised 3 metre springboard at the Games of the XXX Olympiad
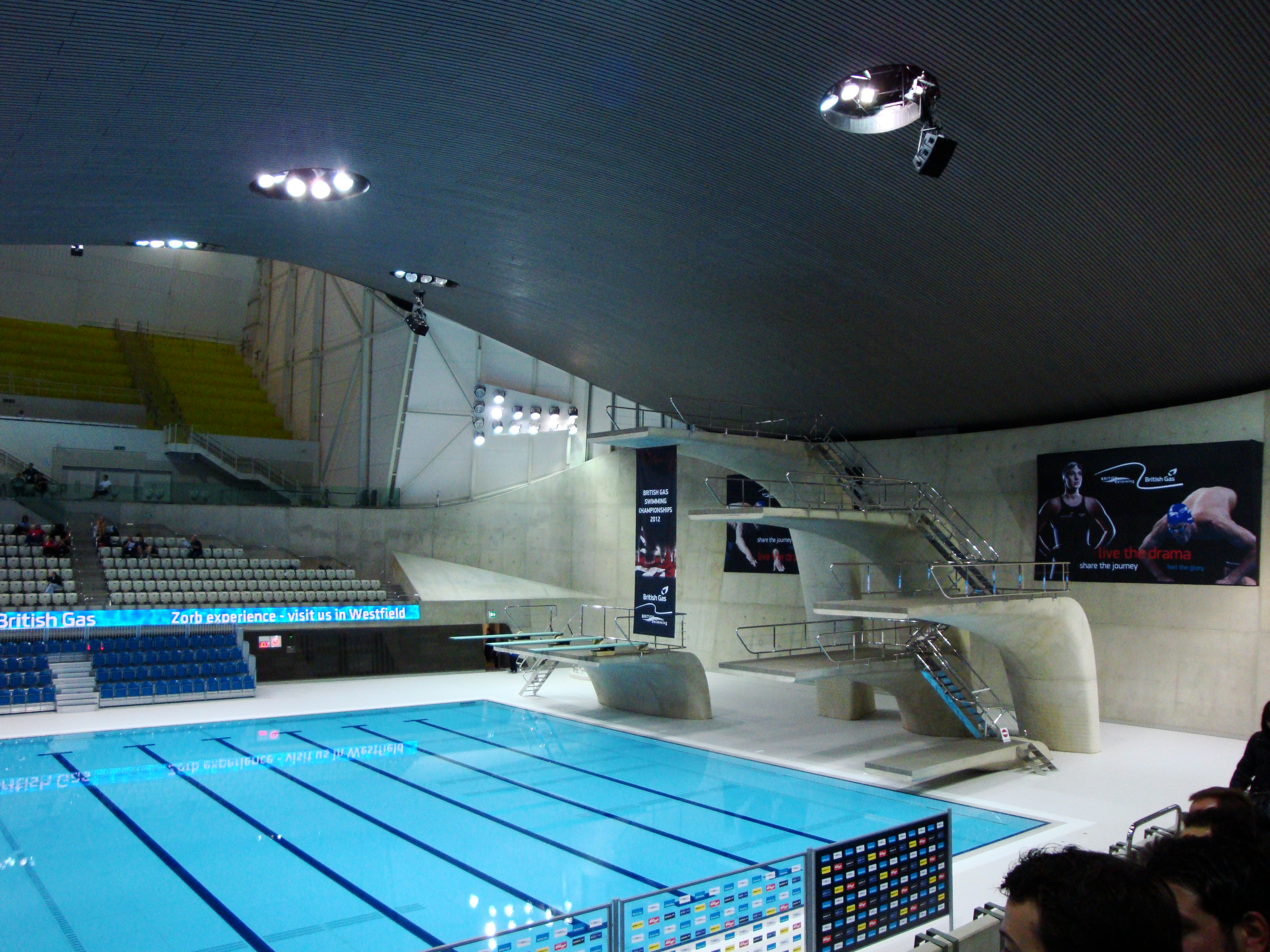
- London Aquatics Centre
- Venue: Aquatics Centre
- Date: 29 July
- Competitors: 16 from 8 nations

Medalists
1st place, gold medalist(s)		He Zi; Wu Minxia	China
2nd place, silver medalist(s)		Kelci Bryant; Abigail Johnston	United States
3rd place, bronze medalist(s)		Jennifer Abel; Émilie Heymans	Canada

The women's synchronised 3 metre springboard diving competition at the 2012 Olympic Games in London took place on 29 July at the Aquatics Centre within the Olympic Park.

The Chinese team of He Zi and Wu Minxia won the gold medal.

== Format ==
A single round was held, with each team making five dives. Eleven judges scored each dive: three for each diver and five for synchronisation. Only the middle score counted for each diver, with the middle three counting for synchronisation. These five scores were averaged, multiplied by 3, and multiplied by the dive's degree of difficulty to give a total dive score. The scores for each of the five dives were summed to give a final score.

== Schedule ==
Times are British Summer Time (UTC+1)

Date	Time	Round
Sunday 29 July 2012	15:00	Final

== Results ==
Rank	Divers	Dives					Total
Rank	Divers	1	2	3	4	5	Total
1st place, gold medalist(s)	China; He Zi; Wu Minxia	54.00	52.80	79.20	80.10	80.10	346.20
2nd place, silver medalist(s)	United States; Kelci Bryant; Abigail Johnston	52.80	52.20	74.70	70.20	72.00	321.90
3rd place, bronze medalist(s)	Canada; Jennifer Abel; Émilie Heymans	53.40	47.40	72.90	74.70	68.40	316.80
4	Italy; Tania Cagnotto; Francesca Dallapé	52.20	52.20	74.70	63.90	71.10	314.10
5	Australia; Sharleen Stratton; Anabelle Smith	49.20	49.20	70.20	69.75	66.60	304.95
6	Ukraine; Olena Fedorova; Hanna Pysmenska	49.20	48.00	63.00	72.90	69.30	302.40
7	Great Britain; Alicia Blagg; Rebecca Gallantree	49.80	52.20	56.70	72.00	54.90	285.60
8	Malaysia; Cheong Jun Hoong; Pandelela Rinong	46.20	47.40	54.00	71.10	64.80	283.50
