= Calle Steen =

Swedish ice hockey player (born 1980)

- Born: 16 May 1980 (age 45) Stockholm, Sweden
- Height: 6 ft 0 in (183 cm)
- Weight: 205 lb (93 kg; 14 st 9 lb)
- Position: Centre
- Shot: Left
- Allsvenskan team Former teams: Malmö Redhawks; Färjestads BK; Leksands IF
- NHL draft: 142nd overall, 1998; Detroit Red Wings
- Playing career: 1997–2009

Calle Erik Steén (born 16 May 1980) is a Swedish former professional ice hockey player.

Steen was drafted in the 1998 NHL entry draft in the 5th round as the 142nd pick overall by the Detroit Red Wings. At that time, he played for Hammarby IF in the second highest league in Sweden, Allsvenskan. But only playing five games in the 1998/99 season, Steen moved league rival Mora IK in the summer of 1999. He stayed only one season with Mora and then moved to the Finnish SM-Liiga club JYP Jyväskylä. But he did not stay there for long a time, after only five games he moved back to Sweden and Bofors IK of Allsvenskan. And finally, he got some success. He stayed in Bofors for two and a half seasons, in the final season he played alongside his brother Oscar. Then Bofors traded him to Färjestads BK of the Elitserien. Steen had a good playoffs with Färjestad, 6 points in 12 games. The following season, he played for Färjestad, except for a 4-game loan to Bofors. He also played the 2004/05 season with Färjestad, and once again he played together with his brother Oscar, who had been traded to Färjestad in January 2006. But after the season, he and his brother wanted a better contract, and Färjestad wasn't willing to get them a better contract, so the brothers instead signed with league rivals Leksands IF. But after the 2005/05 season, Leksand was relegated from Elitserien to Allsvenskan. He then moved to fellow Allsvenskan side Södertälje SK in 2006 before joining the Malmö Redhawks in 2007.

Due to several knee injuries, he announced his retirement on 25 August 2009.

Calle Steen is engaged for marriage to the Swedish diver Anna Lindberg and together they have one son, Yelverton, born in 2009.

== Awards and achievements ==
- SM-silver Medal 2003, 2004, 2005

== Career statistics ==
| | | | Regular season | | | | | Playoffs | | | | | Qualification |
| Season | Team | League | GP | G | A | Pts | PIM | GP | G | A | Pts | PIM | GP | G | A | Pts | PIM |
|---|---|---|---|---|---|---|---|---|---|---|---|---|---|---|---|---|---|
| 1998-99 | Hammarby | Allsvenskan | -- | -- | -- | -- | -- | 5 | 0 | 2 | 2 | 4 | -- | -- | -- | -- | -- |
| 1999-00 | Mora IK | Allsvenskan | 32 | 4 | 4 | 8 | 48 | 4 | 0 | 0 | 0 | 6 | -- | -- | -- | -- | -- |
| 2000-01 | JYP | SM-Liiga | 5 | 0 | 0 | 0 | 0 | -- | -- | -- | -- | -- | -- | -- | -- | -- | -- |
| 2000-01 | Bofors IK | Allsvenskan | 31 | 4 | 7 | 11 | 69 | -- | -- | -- | -- | -- | -- | -- | -- | -- | -- |
| 2001-02 | Bofors IK | Allsvenskan | 43 | 12 | 16 | 28 | 58 | 6 | 2 | 2 | 4 | 12 | -- | -- | -- | -- | -- |
| 2001-02 | Bofors IK | Elitserien | -- | -- | -- | -- | -- | -- | -- | -- | -- | -- | 10 | 0 | 6 | 6 | 20 |
| 2002-03 | Bofors IK | Allsvenskan | 33 | 14 | 20 | 34 | 112 | -- | -- | -- | -- | -- | -- | -- | -- | -- | -- |
| 2002-03 | Färjestads BK | Elitserien | 11 | 0 | 2 | 2 | 2 | 12 | 1 | 5 | 6 | 12 | -- | -- | -- | -- | -- |
| 2003-04 | Bofors IK | Allsvenskan | 4 | 1 | 2 | 3 | 4 | -- | -- | -- | -- | -- | -- | -- | -- | -- | -- |
| 2003-04 | Färjestads BK | Elitserien | 43 | 2 | 10 | 12 | 42 | 15 | 2 | 3 | 5 | 41 | -- | -- | -- | -- | -- |
| 2004-05 | Färjestads BK | Elitserien | 47 | 4 | 13 | 17 | 50 | 15 | 0 | 0 | 0 | 18 | -- | -- | -- | -- | -- |
| 2005-06 | Leksands IF | Elitserien | 44 | 4 | 15 | 19 | 74 | -- | -- | -- | -- | -- | 9 | 1 | 3 | 4 | 20 |
| Elitserien totals | | | 145 | 10 | 42 | 52 | 168 | 42 | 3 | 8 | 11 | 71 | 19 | 1 | 9 | 10 | 40 |
| Allsvenskan totals | | | 143 | 35 | 49 | 84 | 291 | 15 | 2 | 4 | 6 | 22 | -- | -- | -- | -- | -- |
| SM-Liiga totals | | | 5 | 0 | 0 | 0 | 0 | -- | -- | -- | -- | -- | -- | -- | -- | -- | -- |
