= 2009 European Diving Championships =

Water sport competitions

- Host city: Turin
- Country: Italy
- Nations: 20
- Athletes: 104
- Events: 10
- Dates: 1 April 2009– 5 April 2009
- Main venue: Monumentale Pool
- Website: www.torino2009.com

The 2009 European Diving Championships was the first edition of the European Diving Championships and took part from 1–5 April 2009 in Turin, Italy. For the first time, the event was held separately from the European Swimming Championships. The event was held on Monumentale Diving Stadium. The former capital of Italy was hosting European Diving Championships for the third time after 1954 and 2009. A total of ten disciplines was on the schedule. Additionally, there was a team event on the first day of competition.

== Results ==
=== Men ===
Event	Gold	Points	Silver	Points	Bronze	Points
Individual diving
Springboard 1 m	(Ukraine) Illya Kvasha	420.90	(Italy) Christopher Sacchin	418.55	(Germany) Pavlo Rozenberg	405.20
Springboard 3 m	(Russia) Aleksandr Dobroskok	482.75	(Ukraine) Illya Kvasha	475.90	(Italy) Michele Benedetti	447.75
Platform 10 m	(Russia) Aleksei Kravchenko	521.75	(Russia) Dmitriy Dobroskok	493.30	(Germany) Patrick Hausding	466.00
Synchronized diving
Springboard 3 m	Ukraine; Illya Kvasha; Oleksiy Pryhorov	422.31	Russia; Ilya Zakharov; Gleb Galperin	418.47	Italy; Tommaso Marconi; Nicola Marconi	407.19
Platform 10 m	Germany; Sascha Klein; Patrick Hausding	474.06	Russia; Oleg Vikulov; Aleksei Kravchenko	440.52	Ukraine; Oleksandr Bondar; Oleksandr Gorshkovozov	406.23

=== Women ===
Event	Gold	Points	Silver	Points	Bronze	Points
Individual diving
Springboard 1 m	(Italy) Tania Cagnotto	290.90	(Italy) Maria Marconi	280.20	(Germany) Katja Dieckow	267.65
Springboard 3 m	(Italy) Tania Cagnotto	345.85	(Ukraine) Olena Fedorova	334.25	(Germany) Katja Dieckow	317.20
Platform 10 m	(Russia) Yulia Koltunova	331.35	(Germany) Nora Subschinski	318.50	(United Kingdom) Brooke Graddon	317.70
Synchronized diving
Springboard 3 m	Italy; Tania Cagnotto; Francesca Dallapè	317.40	Germany; Katja Dieckow; Nora Subschinski	312.60	Ukraine; Olena Fedorova; Alevtina Korolyova	301.38
Platform 10 m	Russia; Natalia Goncharova; Yulia Koltunova	315.78	Germany; Nora Subschinski; Josephine Möller	296.28	United Kingdom; Helen Galashan; Carol Galashan	291.96

== Medal table ==
Rank	Nation	Gold	Silver	Bronze	Total
1	Russia (RUS)	4	3	0	7
2	Italy (ITA)	3	2	2	7
3	Ukraine (UKR)	2	2	2	6
4	Germany (GER)	1	3	4	8
5	Great Britain (GBR)	0	0	2	2
Totals (5 entries)		10	10	10	30
