= Carmen Casteiner =

Italian diver (born 1954)

Personal information
- Born: 27 September 1954 (age 70); Bolzano, Italy
- Spouse: Giorgio Cagnotto
- Children: Tania Cagnotto

Sport
- Sport: Diving

Carmen Casteiner (born 27 September 1954) is a retired Italian diver. She finished nineteenth in the 10 metre platform event of the 1976 Olympic Games.

She is married to fellow diver Giorgio Cagnotto and is the mother of Tania Cagnotto, who also went on to become a prominent athlete in the same event.
