= Alevtina Korolyova =

Ukrainian diver (born 1989)

Personal information
- Native name: Алевтина Павлівна Корольова
- Born: 22 March 1989 (age 37) Orotukan, RSFSR, Soviet Union

Sport
- Country: Ukraine
- Sport: Diving
- Partner: Olena Fedorova
Medal record
Women's diving
Representing Ukraine
European Aquatics Championships
Bronze medal – third place	2008 Eindhoven	3 m synchro
European Diving Championships
Bronze medal – third place	2009 Turin	3 m synchro
European Junior Championships
Silver medal – second place	2007 Trieste	1 m springboard
Silver medal – second place	2007 Trieste	3 m springboard

Alevtina Pavlivna Korolyova (Ukrainian: Алевтина Павлівна Корольова, born 22 March 1989 in Orotukan, Russia) is a Ukrainian diver of Russian origin. Competing with Olena Fedorova, she won a bronze medal in the 3 m spring synchro event at the 2008 European Aquatics Championships in Eindhoven and also a bronze medal in 3 m springboard synchro at the 2009 European Diving Championships in Turin.

== Career ==
Her first achievement in international competitions is a win of two silver medals in 1 m and 3 m springboard events at the 2007 European Junior Diving Championships in Trieste.

Then Fedorova/Korolyova won a bronze medal in FINA Diving Grand Prix in Moscow, Russia. They also competed at the 2007 World Aquatics Championships in 3 m synchro event without reaching a medal (4th place).

In 2008, Olena Fedorova and Alevtina Korolyova received a silver medal in 3 m synchro at the FINA Diving Grand Prix in Madrid, Spain. At the 2008 European Aquatics Championships, held in Eindhoven, she won a bronze medal in the 3 m spring synchro event with Olena Fedorova.

Then Fedorova/Korolyova competed for Ukraine at the 2009 European Diving Championships, held in Turin, receiving bronze medals in the 3 m synchro event. They also competed at the 2009 World Aquatics Championships in 3 m synchro and 1 m springboard events without reaching any medals.
