= Fanny Bouvet =

French diver

Personal information
- Born: 15 February 1994 (age 32) Versailles, France

Sport
- Sport: Diving
Medal record
Representing France
European Junior Championships
Gold medal – first place	2008 Minsk	3m springboard

Fanny Bouvet (born 15 February 1994) is a French diver. She dives for Rennes CPB. She often competes in springboard diving from the 1-meter and 3-meter board, and with Marion Farissier trained in the 3-meter synchronized diving.

Bouvet won her first international success at the 2008 European Junior Championships in Minsk, in her age group she won the title from the 3-meter board. She was competed at the 2010 Youth Olympic Games in Singapore, she finished ninth in the 3 metre springboard. She took part in her first senior competition at the 2010 European Aquatics Championships in Budapest, however, she didn't go past the preliminaries in the one-meter springboard.

In 2011, Bouvet reached her first final and competed in synchronized diving with Marion Farissier they finished in eleventh place in the final at the 2011 World Aquatics Championships in Shanghai. They finished in seventh place in the same event at the 2011 European Diving Championships in Turin. Bouvet qualified in each of the 3-meter springboard events for the 2012 Summer Olympics in London.
