= Giorgio Cagnotto =

Italian diver (born 1947)

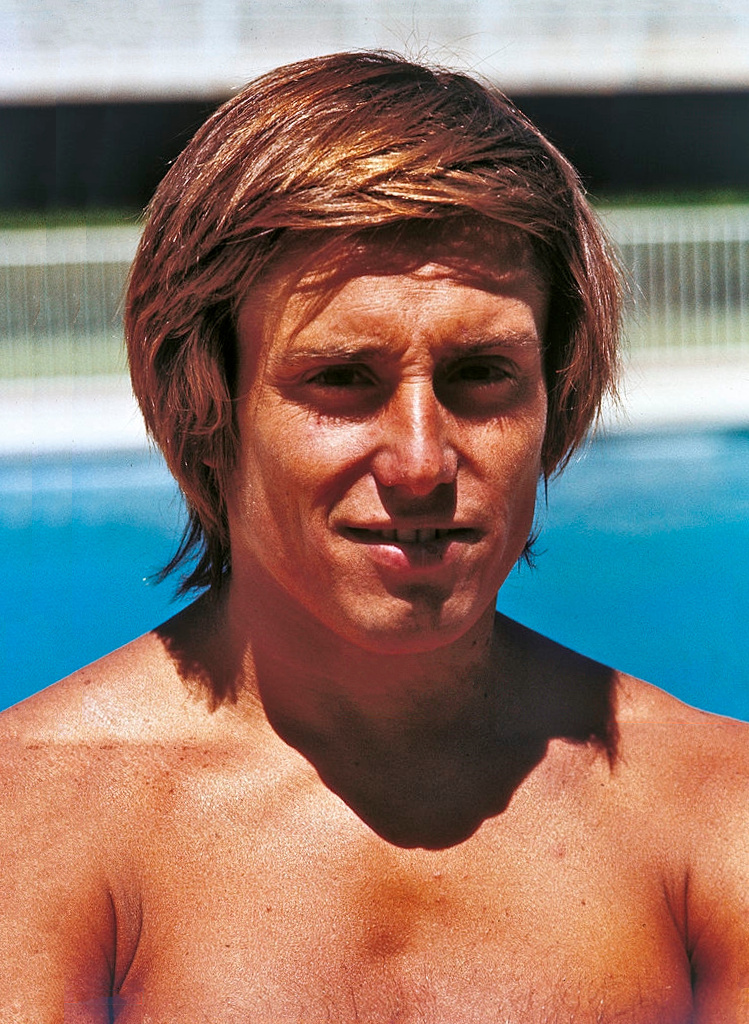
- Cagnotto at the 1972 Olympics

Personal information
- Full name: Franco Giorgio Cagnotto
- Nationality: Italy
- Born: 2 June 1947 (age 79) Turin, Italy
- Height: 1.63 m (5 ft 4 in)
- Weight: 60 kg (132 lb)
- Spouse: Carmen Casteiner
- Children: Tania Cagnotto

Sport
- Sport: Diving
- Events: 1 m and 3 m springboard 10 m platform
- Club: Lancia Torino
Medal record
Event	1st	2nd	3rd
Summer Olympics	0	2	2
World Championships	0	0	1
European Championships	1	2	2
Total	1	4	5
Olympic Games
Silver medal – second place	1972 Munich	3 m springboard
Silver medal – second place	1976 Montreal	3 m springboard
Bronze medal – third place	1972 Munich	10 m platform
Bronze medal – third place	1980 Moscow	3 m springboard
World Championships
Bronze medal – third place	1978 West Berlin	3 m springboard
European Championships
Gold medal – first place	1970 Barcelona	3 m springboard
Silver medal – second place	1974 Vienna	3 m springboard
Silver medal – second place	1977 Jönköping	3 m springboard
Bronze medal – third place	1966 Utrecht	3 m springboard
Bronze medal – third place	1970 Barcelona	10 m platform

Franco Giorgio Cagnotto (Italian pronunciation: [ˈdʒordʒo kaɲˈɲɔtto]; born 2 June 1947) is an Italian former diver, who competed in five consecutive Summer Olympics for his native country, starting in 1964.

== Biography ==
He is married to fellow diver Carmen Casteiner. Their daughter, Tania Cagnotto, went on to also become a prominent athlete in the same event. In 1992, he was inducted in the International Swimming Hall of Fame.

== See also ==
- List of members of the International Swimming Hall of Fame
