= Anna Lindberg =

Swedish diver (born 1981)

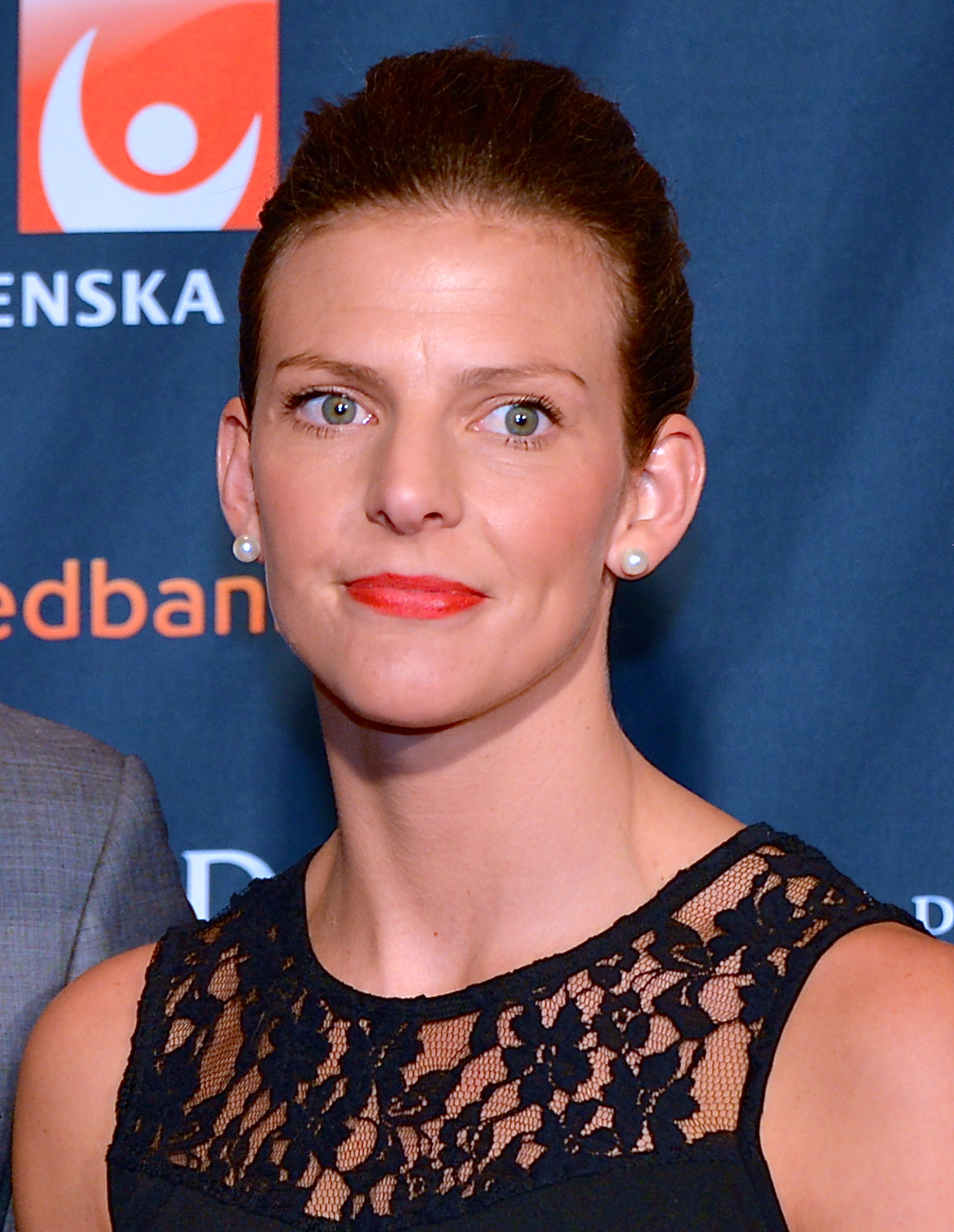

Personal information
- Born: 16 November 1981 (age 44) Karlskoga, Sweden
Medal record
Women's diving
Representing Sweden
European Championships
Gold medal – first place	2006 Budapest	1m Springboard
Gold medal – first place	2006 Budapest	3m Springboard
Gold medal – first place	2008 Eindhoven	1m Springboard
Gold medal – first place	2011 Turin	3m Springboard
Gold medal – first place	2012 Eindhoven	1m Springboard
Gold medal – first place	2012 Eindhoven	3m Springboard
Silver medal – second place	2010 Budapest	1 m springboard
Bronze medal – third place	1997 Seville	3m Springboard
Bronze medal – third place	2000 Helsinki	3m Springboard
Bronze medal – third place	2011 Turin	1m Springboard

Anna Ulrika Lindberg (born 16 November 1981) is a Swedish former diver. She won the 1m and 3m Springboard events at the 2006 European Aquatics Championships and the 2012 European Aquatics Championships. She is the daughter of former Swedish divers Ulrika Knape and Mathz Lindberg.

Lindberg competed in five Olympic Summer Games, in 1996, 2000, 2004, 2008 and 2012. Her best result was a 5th place on the 3m springboard in 2000.

In 2022, she participated in the second season of Masked Singer Sweden, broadcast on TV4.

She gave birth to a son, Yelverton, on 30 May 2009. The father is the Swedish hockey player Calle Steen.
