= Abigail Johnston =

American Olympic diver

Abby Johnston
Personal information
- Full name: Abigail Louise Johnston
- Nickname: Abby
- Born: November 16, 1989 (age 36) Columbus, Ohio, U.S.
- Home town: Upper Arlington, Ohio, U.S.
- Education: Duke University
- Height: 5 ft 5 in (165 cm)
- Weight: 134 lb (61 kg)

Sport
- Country: United States
- Sport: Diving
- Event(s): 3 m, 3 m synchro, London 2012 olympics
Medal record
Event	1st	2nd	3rd
Olympic Games	-	1	-
Summer Universiade	0	0	2
Women's diving
Representing United States
Olympic Games
Silver medal – second place	2012 London	3 m springboard synchro
Summer Universiade
Bronze medal – third place	2009 Belgrade	Team
Bronze medal – third place	2009 Belgrade	3 m synchro

Abigail Louise Johnston (born November 16, 1989) is a former Olympic diver. At the 2012 Summer Olympics, she won a silver medal in the Women's synchronized 3 metre springboard with partner Kelci Bryant. She also competed at the 2016 Olympics in the individual 3 m springboard.

== Personal ==
Johnston is the daughter of David and Elaine Johnston. She has two sisters, Adrienne and Leah. She earned her bachelor's degree at Duke University and during the 2016 Summer Olympics in Rio was a medical student at Duke, expecting to graduate as a medical doctor from Duke University School of Medicine in 2018.
