= 2012 European Aquatics Championships =

Water sport competitions

31st European Aquatics Championships
- Host city: (Hungary) Debrecen (Netherlands) Eindhoven
- Date: 14–27 May 2012isako
- Venue(s): Debrecen Swimming Pool Complex; Hoogenband Swimming Stadium

The 2012 European Aquatics Championships were held from 14 to 27 May 2012 in Debrecen, Hungary and Eindhoven, Netherlands. The 2012 European Swimming Championships were to take place in Antwerp, Belgium, but were reallocated to the City of Debrecen and were held on the same dates as previously planned, from 21 to 27 May. The Diving Championships were held in Eindhoven from 15 to 20 May. The Synchronised Swimming discipline, originally intended to take place in Antwerp, have also been reallocated, with its continental titles having been contested in Eindhoven. Originally, the Championships had been awarded to Vienna, but later they backed out due to the Great Recession.

The 2012 European Water Polo Championships were held separately a few months earlier, from 16 to 29 January, also in Eindhoven, Netherlands.

== Schedule ==
Competition dates by discipline were:

- Swimming: 21–27 May (Debrecen)
- Diving: 15–20 May (Eindhoven)
- Synchro: 23–27 May (Eindhoven)
- Water Polo: 16–29 January (Eindhoven)

== Medal table ==
* Host nation (Hungary)

Rank	Nation	Gold	Silver	Bronze	Total
1	Hungary*	9	10	7	26
2	Germany	9	9	6	24
3	Italy	7	10	6	23
4	France	6	4	4	14
5	Spain	5	3	3	11
6	Sweden	4	4	2	10
7	Russia	3	4	5	12
8	Ukraine	2	6	7	15
9	Great Britain	2	2	0	4
10	Norway	2	0	1	3
11	Greece	1	0	5	6
12	Israel	1	0	4	5
13	Czech Republic	1	0	2	3
14	Slovenia	1	0	1	2
15	Poland	1	0	0	1
15	Serbia	1	0	0	1
17	Croatia	0	1	0	1
17	Estonia	0	1	0	1
17	Ireland	0	1	0	1
17	Netherlands	0	1	0	1
21	Austria	0	0	1	1
21	Belarus	0	0	1	1
21	Romania	0	0	1	1
Totals (23 entries)		55	56	56	167

== Swimming ==
=== Results ===
==== Men's events ====
Event	Gold		Silver		Bronze	
50 m freestyle	Frédérick Bousquet; France	21.80	Stefan Nystrand; Sweden	22.04	Andriy Hovorov; Ukraine	22.18
100 m freestyle	Filippo Magnini; Italy	48.77	Alain Bernard; France	48.95	Norbert Trandafir; Romania	49.13
200 m freestyle	Paul Biedermann; Germany	1:46.27	Amaury Leveaux; France	1:47.69	Dominik Kozma; Hungary	1:47.72
400 m freestyle	Paul Biedermann; Germany	3:47.84	Gergő Kis; Hungary	3:48.09	Samuel Pizzetti; Italy	3:48.66
800 m freestyle	Gergő Kis; Hungary	7:49.46	Gregorio Paltrinieri; Italy	7:52.23	Sergiy Frolov; Ukraine	7:52.81
1500 m freestyle	Gregorio Paltrinieri; Italy	14:48.92	Gergő Kis; Hungary	14:58.15	Gergely Gyurta; Hungary	15:04.38
50 m backstroke	Jonatan Kopelev; Israel	24.73	Mirco Di Tora; Italy	24.95	Guy Barnea; Israel; Richárd Bohus; Hungary; Dorian Gandin; France	25.14
100 m backstroke	Aristeidis Grigoriadis; Greece	53.86	Helge Meeuw; Germany	54.06	Yakov-Yan Toumarkin; Israel	54.14
200 m backstroke	Radosław Kawęcki; Poland	1:55.28	Péter Bernek; Hungary	1:55.88	Yakov-Yan Toumarkin; Israel	1:57.35
50 m breaststroke	Damir Dugonjič; Slovenia	27.32	Fabio Scozzoli; Italy	27.49	Panagiotis Samilidis; Greece	27.64
100 m breaststroke	Fabio Scozzoli; Italy	1:00.55	Valeriy Dymo; Ukraine	1:00.68	Mattia Pesce; Italy	1:00.93
200 m breaststroke	Dániel Gyurta; Hungary	2:08.60	Marco Koch; Germany	2:09.26	Panagiotis Samilidis; Greece	2:09.72
50 m butterfly	Rafael Muñoz; Spain	23.16	Frédérick Bousquet; France	23.30	Yauhen Tsurkin; Belarus	23.37
100 m butterfly	Milorad Čavić; Serbia	51.45	László Cseh; Hungary	51.77	Matteo Rivolta; Italy	52.40
200 m butterfly	László Cseh; Hungary	1:54.95	Bence Biczó; Hungary	1:55.85	Ioannis Drymonakos; Greece	1:56.48
200 m individual medley	László Cseh; Hungary	1:56.66	James Goddard; Great Britain	1:57.84	Markus Rogan; Austria	1:59.39
400 m individual medley	László Cseh; Hungary	4:12.17	Dávid Verrasztó; Hungary	4:14.23	Ioannis Drymonakos; Greece	4:14.41
4 × 100 m freestyle relay	France; Amaury Leveaux (48.59); Alain Bernard (48.29); Frédérick Bousquet (48.40); Jérémy Stravius (48.27)	3:13.55	Italy; Andrea Rolla (49.48); Marco Orsi (48.15); Michele Santucci (49.11); Filippo Magnini (47.97)	3:14.71	Russia; Vitaly Syrnikov (49.48); Oleg Tikhobaev (48.01); Nikita Konovalov (48.39); Viacheslav Andrusenko (49.25)	3:15.13
4 × 200 m freestyle relay	Germany; Paul Biedermann (1:46.70); Dimitri Colupaev (1:47.41); Clemens Rapp (1:47.90); Tim Wallburger (1:47.16)	7:09.17	Italy; Gianluca Maglia (1:48.58); Riccardo Maestri (1:47.87); Samuel Pizzetti (1:48.26); Filippo Magnini (1:48.41)	7:13.10	Hungary; Dominik Kozma (1:48.31); Gergő Kis (1:47.60); Péter Bernek (1:49.46); László Cseh (1:48.23)	7:13.60
4 × 100 m medley relay	Italy; Mirco di Tora (54.40); Fabio Scozzoli (59.38); Matteo Rivolta (51.24); Filippo Magnini (47.78)	3:32.80	Germany; Helge Meeuw (54.52); Christian vom Lehn (1:00.21); Steffen Deibler (51.74); Marco di Carli (47.94)	3:34.41	Hungary; Péter Bernek (54.79); Dániel Gyurta (59.33); László Cseh (51.88); Dominik Kozma (48.57)	3:34.57

==== Women's events ====
Event	Gold		Silver		Bronze	
50 m freestyle	Britta Steffen; Germany	24.37	Hinkelien Schreuder; Netherlands	24.78	Nery Mantey Niangkouara; Greece	24.93
100 m freestyle	Sarah Sjöström; Sweden	53.61	Britta Steffen; Germany	54.15	Daniela Schreiber; Germany	54.41
200 m freestyle	Federica Pellegrini; Italy	1:56.76	Silke Lippok; Germany	1:58.19	Ophélie-Cyrielle Étienne; France	1:58.23
400 m freestyle	Coralie Balmy; France	4:05.31	Mireia Belmonte García; Spain	4:05.45	Ophélie-Cyrielle Étienne; France	4:07.47
800 m freestyle	Boglárka Kapás; Hungary	8:26.49	Coralie Balmy; France	8:27.79	Éva Risztov; Hungary	8:27.87
1500 m freestyle	Mireia Belmonte García; Spain	16:05.34	Éva Risztov; Hungary	16:10.04	Erika Villaécija García; Spain	16:15.85
50 m backstroke	Mercedes Peris; Spain	28.25	Arianna Barbieri; Italy; Sanja Jovanović; Croatia	28.31	not awarded	
100 m backstroke	Jenny Mensing; Germany	1:00.08	Arianna Barbieri; Italy	1:00.54	Simona Baumrtová; Czech Republic	1:00.57
200 m backstroke	Alexianne Castel; France	2:08.41	Jenny Mensing; Germany	2:09.55	Duane Da Rocha; Spain	2:09.56
50 m breaststroke	Petra Chocová; Czech Republic	31.25	Sycerika McMahon; Ireland	31.27	Caroline Ruhnau; Germany	31.35
100 m breaststroke	Sarah Poewe; Germany	1:07.33	Jennie Johansson; Sweden	1:07.85	Marina García; Spain	1:07.91
200 m breaststroke	Sara Nordenstam; Norway	2:26.91	Irina Novikova; Russia	2:27.25	Sarah Poewe; Germany	2:27.80
50 m butterfly	Sarah Sjöström; Sweden	25.64	Triin Aljand; Estonia	25.92	Ingvild Snildal; Norway	26.12
100 m butterfly	Ingvild Snildal; Norway	58.04	Martina Granström; Sweden	58.07	Amit Ivri; Israel	58.78
200 m butterfly	Katinka Hosszú; Hungary	2:07.28	Zsuzsanna Jakabos; Hungary	2:07.86	Martina Granström; Sweden	2:08.22
200 m individual medley	Katinka Hosszú; Hungary	2:10.84	Sophie Allen; Great Britain	2:11.49	Evelyn Verrasztó; Hungary	2:11.63
400 m individual medley	Katinka Hosszú; Hungary	4:33.76	Zsuzsanna Jakabos; Hungary	4:35.68	Barbora Závadová; Czech Republic	4:38.07
4 × 100 m freestyle relay	Germany; Britta Steffen (54.21); Silke Lippok (55.07); Lisa Vitting (55.33); Daniela Schreiber (53.37)	3:37.98	Sweden; Ida Marko-Varga (55.66); Michelle Coleman (54.08); Sarah Sjöström (54.04); Gabriella Fagundez (54.62)	3:38.40	Italy; Alice Mizzau (55.14); Federica Pellegrini (54.29); Erica Buratto (55.50); Erika Ferraioli (54.91)	3:39.84
4 × 200 m freestyle relay	Italy; Alice Mizzau (1:58.67); Alice Nesti (1:59.50); Diletta Carli (1:59.40); Federica Pellegrini (1:55.33)	7:52.90	Hungary; Zsuzsanna Jakabos (1:58.43); Evelyn Verrasztó (1:59.02); Ágnes Mutina (1:58.52); Katinka Hosszú (1:58.73)	7:54.70	Slovenia; Sara Isaković (1:59.06); Anja Klinar (1:59.23); Urša Bežan (1:59.98); Mojca Sagmeister (2:01.46)	7:59.73
4 × 100 m medley relay	Germany; Jenny Mensing (1:00.51); Sarah Poewe (1:07.44); Alexandra Wenk (57.74); Britta Steffen (52.74)	3:58.43 CR	Italy; Arianna Barbieri (1:00.83); Chiara Bogiatto (1:08.51); Ilaria Bianchi (57.45); Alice Mizzau (55.13)	4:01.92	Sweden; Therese Svendsen (1:03.34); Joline Höstman (1:08.54); Martina Grandström (58.46); Natalie Lindborg (55.24)	4:05.58

=== Medal table ===
Rank	Nation	Gold	Silver	Bronze	Total
1	Hungary	9	10	7	26
2	Germany	8	6	3	17
3	Italy	6	8	4	18
4	France	4	4	3	11
5	Spain	3	1	3	7
6	Sweden	2	4	2	8
7	Norway	2	0	1	3
8	Greece	1	0	5	6
9	Israel	1	0	4	5
10	Czech Republic	1	0	2	3
11	Slovenia	1	0	1	2
12	Poland	1	0	0	1
12	Serbia	1	0	0	1
14	Great Britain	0	2	0	2
15	Ukraine	0	1	2	3
16	Russia	0	1	1	2
17	Croatia	0	1	0	1
17	Estonia	0	1	0	1
17	Ireland	0	1	0	1
17	Netherlands	0	1	0	1
21	Austria	0	0	1	1
21	Belarus	0	0	1	1
21	Romania	0	0	1	1
Totals (23 entries)		40	41	41	122

== Diving ==
=== Results ===
==== Men's events ====
Event	Gold		Silver		Bronze	
1 m springboard	Illya Kvasha; Ukraine	430.50	Evgeny Kuznetsov; Russia	412.65	Matthieu Rosset; France	403.95
3 m springboard	Matthieu Rosset; France	504.00	Patrick Hausding; Germany	502.75	Ilya Zakharov; Russia	493.80
3 m synchro springboard	Evgeny Kuznetsov; Ilya Zakharov; Russia	445.92	Patrick Hausding; Stephan Feck; Germany	433.68	Oleksiy Pryhorov; Illya Kvasha; Ukraine	432.48
10 m platform	Tom Daley; Great Britain	565.05	Victor Minibaev; Russia	515.40	Gleb Galperin; Russia	511.55
10 m synchro platform	Sascha Klein; Patrick Hausding; Germany	463.08	Ilya Zakharov; Victor Minibaev; Russia	458.07	Oleksandr Bondar; Oleksandr Gorshkovozov; Ukraine	437.79

==== Women's events ====
Event	Gold		Silver		Bronze	
1 m springboard	Anna Lindberg; Sweden	301.35	Tania Cagnotto; Italy	281.30	Nadezhda Bazhina; Russia	275.15
3 m springboard	Anna Lindberg; Sweden	342.75	Uschi Freitag; Germany	321.40	Olena Fedorova; Ukraine	315.00
3 m synchro springboard	Francesca Dallapé; Tania Cagnotto; Italy	325.50	Hanna Pysmenska; Olena Fedorova; Ukraine	302.10	Katja Dieckow; Uschi Freitag; Germany	296.70
10 m platform	Yulia Prokopchuk; Ukraine	321.55	Noemi Batki; Italy	315.60	Maria Kurjo; Germany	312.65
10 m synchro platform	Tonia Couch; Sarah Barrow; Great Britain	319.56	Viktoriya Potyekhina; Yulia Prokopchuk; Ukraine	310.68	Nora Subschinski; Christin Steuer; Germany	303.93

==== Team events ====
Event	Gold		Silver		Bronze	
Team Event	Audrey Labeau; Matthieu Rosset; France	416.50	Olena Fedorova; Oleksandr Bondar; Ukraine	387.85	Nadezhda Bazhina; Artem Chesakov; Russia	384.30

=== Medal table ===
Rank	Nation	Gold	Silver	Bronze	Total
1	Ukraine	2	3	3	8
2	France	2	0	1	3
3	Great Britain	2	0	0	2
3	Sweden	2	0	0	2
5	Russia	1	3	4	8
6	Germany	1	3	3	7
7	Italy	1	2	0	3
Totals (7 entries)		11	11	11	33

== Synchronised swimming ==
=== Results ===
Event	Gold		Silver		Bronze	
Solo routine	Natalia Ishchenko; Russia	97.810	Andrea Fuentes; Spain	95.900	Lolita Ananasova; Ukraine	92.250
Duet routine	Natalia Ishchenko; Svetlana Romashina; Russia	97.860	Ona Carbonell; Andrea Fuentes; Spain	95.980	Daria Iushko; Kseniya Sydorenko; Ukraine	92.950
Team routine	Clara Basiana; Alba María Cabello; Ona Carbonell; Margalida Crespí; Andrea Fuentes; Thaïs Henríquez; Paula Klamburg; Irene Montrucchio; Spain	96.210	Lolita Ananasova; Daria Iushko; Ganna Klymenko; Olga Kondrashova; Oleksandra Sabada; Kateryna Sadurska; Kseniya Sydorenko; Anna Voloshyna; Ukraine	93.660	Federica Bellaria; Elisa Bozzo; Camilla Catteneo; Manila Flamini; Giulia Lapi; Maria Angela Perrupato; Benedetta Re; Sara Sgarzi; Italy	90.530
Combination routine	Clara Basiana; Alba María Cabello; Clara Camacho; Ona Carbonell; Margalida Crespí; Andrea Fuentes; Thaïs Henríquez; Paula Klamburg; Irene Montrucchio; Laia Pons; Spain	95.600	Lolita Ananasova; Olena Grechykhina; Daria Iushko; Ganna Khmelnytska; Ganna Klymenko; Olga Kondrashova; Oleksandra Sabada; Kateryna Sadurska; Kseniya Sydorenko; Anna Voloshyna; Ukraine	93.420	Federica Bellaria; Elisa Bozzo; Beatrice Callegari; Camilla Catteneo; Linda Cerruti; Francesca Deidda; Manila Flamini; Benedetta Re; Dalila Schiesaro; Sara Sgarzi; Italy	90.440

=== Medal table ===
Rank	Nation	Gold	Silver	Bronze	Total
1	Spain	2	2	0	4
2	Russia	2	0	0	2
3	Ukraine	0	2	2	4
4	Italy	0	0	2	2
Totals (4 entries)		4	4	4	12

== See also ==
- LEN European Aquatics Championships
- List of European Championships records in swimming
- Ligue Européenne de Natation (LEN)
- 2011 World Aquatics Championships
- 2013 World Aquatics Championships
