= 2014 European Aquatics Championships =

Water sport competitions

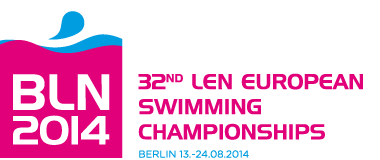
- Host city: (Germany) Berlin
- Date: 13–24 August 2014
- Venue: Velodrom

The 2014 European Aquatics Championships took place from 13 to 24 August 2014 in Berlin, Germany. It was the 31st edition of the championships, and was held in a temporary facility placed in the centre of the Berlin Velodrome. Great Britain headed the medal table on gold medals and total medals, by some distance their best ever performance at the championships. In addition, two world records fell to Great Britain; the 4 × 100 metre mixed medley relay to Adam Peaty, Jemma Lowe, Chris Walker-Hebborn and Fran Halsall, and the men's 50 metre breaststroke to Adam Peaty.

== Schedule ==
Competition dates by discipline were:

- Swimming: 18–24 August
- Diving: 18–24 August
- Open water swimming: 13–17 August
- Synchro: 13–17 August

== Medal table ==
* Host nation (Germany)

Rank	Nation	Gold	Silver	Bronze	Total
1	Great Britain	11	8	8	27
2	Russia	9	7	3	19
3	Italy	8	3	12	23
4	Germany*	6	8	8	22
5	Denmark	6	1	2	9
6	Hungary	5	6	6	17
7	France	5	4	3	12
8	Sweden	3	6	1	10
9	Spain	3	5	5	13
10	Netherlands	3	5	2	10
11	Poland	2	1	1	4
12	Serbia	2	0	0	2
13	Ukraine	1	3	7	11
14	Lithuania	1	1	2	4
15	Belarus	1	1	1	3
16	Faroe Islands	0	2	0	2
17	Greece	0	1	0	1
18	Austria	0	0	1	1
18	Belgium	0	0	1	1
18	Finland	0	0	1	1
18	Slovenia	0	0	1	1
Totals (21 entries)		66	62	65	193

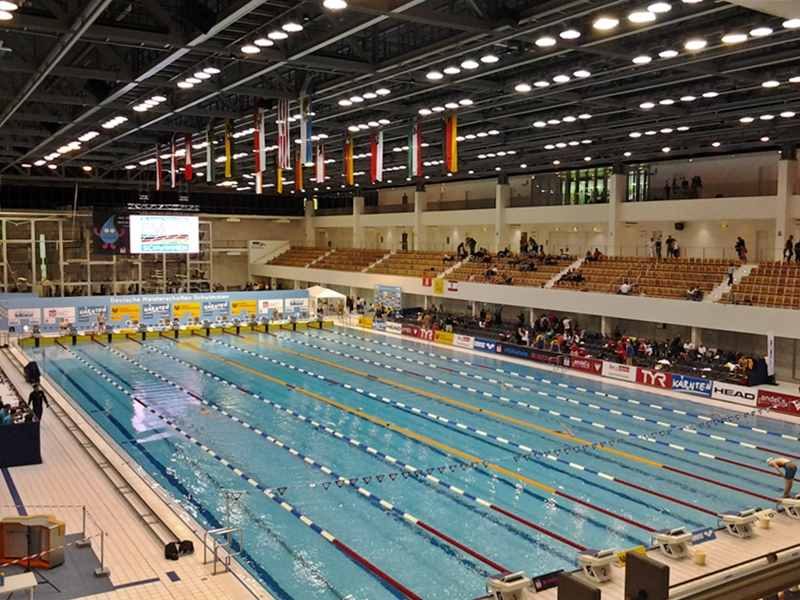
Swimming and diving center in Europasportpark

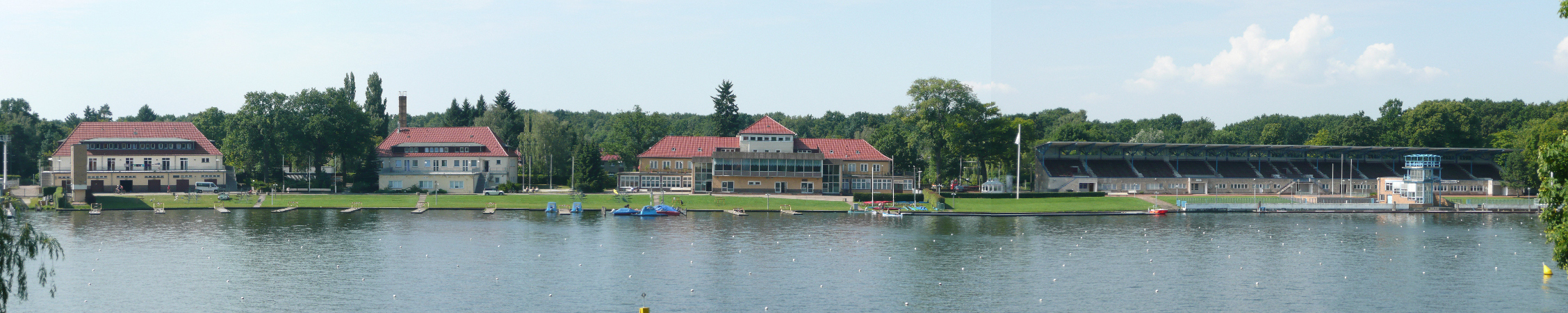
Route of the swimming competition in Berlin-Grünau

== Swimming ==
=== Results ===
42 events: 20 for each sex and 2 mixed. Two gold and one bronze were shared.

==== Men's events ====
Event	Gold		Silver		Bronze	
50 m freestyle	Florent Manaudou; France	21.32 CR	Konrad Czerniak; Poland	21.88	Ari-Pekka Liukkonen; Finland	21.93
100 m freestyle	Florent Manaudou; France	47.98	Fabien Gilot; France	48.36	Luca Leonardi; Italy	48.38
200 m freestyle	Velimir Stjepanović; Serbia	1:45.78; NR	Paul Biedermann; Germany	1:45.80	Yannick Agnel; France	1:46.65
400 m freestyle	Velimir Stjepanović; Serbia	3:45.66; NR	Andrea Mitchell D'Arrigo; Italy	3:46.91	Jay Lelliott; Great Britain	3:47.50
800 metre freestyle	Gregorio Paltrinieri; Italy	7:44.98 CR	Pál Joensen; Faroe Islands	7:48.49	Gabriele Detti; Italy	7:49.35
1500 m freestyle	Gregorio Paltrinieri; Italy	14:39.93; ER CR	Pál Joensen; Faroe Islands	14:50.59	Gabriele Detti; Italy	14:52.53
50 m backstroke	Vladimir Morozov; Russia	24.64	Jérémy Stravius; France	24.84	Chris Walker-Hebborn; Great Britain	25.00
100 m backstroke	Chris Walker-Hebborn; Great Britain	53.32	Jérémy Stravius; France	53.64	Jan-Philip Glania; Germany	54.15
200 m backstroke	Radosław Kawęcki; Poland	1:56.02	Christian Diener; Germany	1:57.16	Gábor Balog; Hungary	1:57.42
50 m breaststroke	Adam Peaty; Great Britain	27.00	Giedrius Titenis; Lithuania	27.34	Damir Dugonjič; Slovenia	27.48
100 m breaststroke	Adam Peaty; Great Britain	58.96	Ross Murdoch; Great Britain	59.43	Giedrius Titenis; Lithuania	59.61
200 m breaststroke	Marco Koch; Germany	2:07.47; CR NR	Ross Murdoch; Great Britain	2:07.77	Giedrius Titenis; Lithuania	2:08.93
50 m butterfly	Florent Manaudou; France Yauhen Tsurkin; Belarus	23.00	None awarded		Andriy Hovorov; Ukraine; Ben Proud; Great Britain	23.21
100 m butterfly	Konrad Czerniak; Poland	51.38; CR	László Cseh; Hungary	51.89	Pavel Sankovich; Belarus	51.92
200 m butterfly	Viktor Bromer; Denmark	1:55.29	Bence Biczó; Hungary	1:55.62	Paweł Korzeniowski; Poland	1:55.74
200 m individual medley	László Cseh; Hungary	1:58.10	Philip Heintz; Germany	1:58.17	Roberto Pavoni; Great Britain	1:58.22
400 m individual medley	Dávid Verrasztó; Hungary	4:11.89	Roberto Pavoni; Great Britain	4:13.75	Federico Turrini; Italy	4:14.15
4 × 100 m freestyle relay	France; Mehdy Metella (48.69); Fabien Gilot (47.85); Florent Manaudou (47.54); Jérémy Stravius (47.56); Grégory Mallet^{[a]} Clément Mignon^{[a]}	3:11.64 CR	Russia; Andrey Grechin (48.56); Nikita Lobintsev (48.54); Alexander Sukhorukov (47.58); Vladimir Morozov (47.99); Sergey Fesikov^{[a]} Oleg Tikhobaev^{[a]}	3:12.67	Italy; Luca Dotto (48.47); Marco Orsi (48.36); Luca Leonardi (47.69); Filippo Magnini (48.26); Marco Belotti^{[a]}	3:12.78
4 × 200 m freestyle relay	Germany; Robin Backhaus (1:48.52); Yannick Lebherz (1:48.73); Clemens Rapp (1:46.80); Paul Biedermann (1:44.95)	7:09.00	Russia; Artem Lobuzov (1:48.18); Dmitry Ermakov (1:47.90); Alexander Krasnykh (1:47.19); Alexander Sukhorukov (1:47.02); Nikita Lobintsev^{a} Viacheslav Andrusenko^{a}	7:10.29	Belgium; Louis Croenen (1:48.41); Glenn Surgeloose (1:48.56); Emmanuel Vanluchene (1:48.25); Pieter Timmers (1:45.17); Ken Cortens^{a}	7:10.39; NR
4 × 100 m medley relay	Great Britain; Chris Walker-Hebborn (54.04); Adam Peaty (58.55); Adam Barrett (50.69); Ben Proud (48.45); Ross Murdoch^{a} Stephen Milne^{a}	3:31.73	France; Jérémy Stravius (53.79); Giacomo Perez-Dortona (1:00.04); Mehdy Metella (51.22); Fabien Gilot (47.42); Benjamin Stasiulis^{a} Grégory Mallet^{a}	3:32.47	Hungary; László Cseh (54.38); Dániel Gyurta (59.64); Bence Pulai (52.01); Dominik Kozma (47.08)	3:33.11

^{a} Swimmers who participated in the heats only and received medals.

==== Women's events ====
Event	Gold		Silver		Bronze	
50 m freestyle	Francesca Halsall; Great Britain	24.32	Sarah Sjöström; Sweden	24.37	Jeanette Ottesen; Denmark	24.53
100 m freestyle	Sarah Sjöström; Sweden	52.67 CR	Femke Heemskerk; Netherlands	53.64	Michelle Coleman; Sweden	53.75
200 m freestyle	Federica Pellegrini; Italy	1:56.01	Katinka Hosszú; Hungary	1:56.69	Femke Heemskerk; Netherlands	1:56.81
400 m freestyle	Jazmin Carlin; Great Britain	4:03.24	Sharon van Rouwendaal; Netherlands	4:03.76	Mireia Belmonte Garcia; Spain	4:04.01
800 m freestyle	Jazmin Carlin; Great Britain	8:15.54 CR	Mireia Belmonte Garcia; Spain	8:21.22	Boglárka Kapás; Hungary	8:22.06
1500 m freestyle	Mireia Belmonte Garcia; Spain	15:57.29 CR	Boglárka Kapás; Hungary	16:03.04	Martina Caramignoli; Italy	16:05.98
50 m backstroke	Francesca Halsall; Great Britain	27.81	Georgia Davies; Great Britain	27.82	Mie Nielsen; Denmark	27.98
100 m backstroke	Katinka Hosszú; Hungary Mie Nielsen; Denmark	59.63	None awarded		Georgia Davies; Great Britain	59.74
200 m backstroke	Duane Da Rocha; Spain	2:09.37	Elizabeth Simmonds; Great Britain	2:09.66	Daria Ustinova; Russia	2.09.79
50 m breaststroke	Rūta Meilutytė; Lithuania	29.89	Jennie Johansson; Sweden	30.52	Moniek Nijhuis; Netherlands	30.64
100 m breaststroke	Rikke Møller Pedersen; Denmark	1:06.23 CR	Jennie Johansson; Sweden	1:07.04	Arianna Castiglioni; Italy	1:07.36
200 m breaststroke	Rikke Møller Pedersen; Denmark	2:19.84 CR	Molly Renshaw; Great Britain	2:23.82 NR	Jessica Vall Montero; Spain	2:24.08
50 m butterfly	Sarah Sjöström; Sweden	24.98	Jeanette Ottesen; Denmark	25.34	Francesca Halsall; Great Britain	25.39
100 m butterfly	Jeanette Ottesen; Denmark	56.51 CR	Sarah Sjöström; Sweden	56.52	Ilaria Bianchi; Italy	57.71
200 m butterfly	Mireia Belmonte Garcia; Spain	2:04.79 CR	Judit Ignacio Sorribes; Spain	2:06.66	Katinka Hosszú; Hungary	2:07.28
200 m individual medley	Katinka Hosszú; Hungary	2:08.11; CR	Aimee Willmott; Great Britain	2:11.44	Lisa Zaiser; Austria	2:12.17
400 m individual medley	Katinka Hosszú; Hungary	4:31.03; CR	Mireia Belmonte Garcia; Spain	4:33.13	Aimee Willmott; Great Britain	4:34.69
4 × 100 m freestyle relay	Sweden; Michelle Coleman (53.85); Magdalena Kuras (55.55); Louise Hansson (54.28); Sarah Sjöström (52.14)	3:35.82	Netherlands; Inge Dekker (54.50); Maud van der Meer (54.49); Esmee Vermeulen (54.49); Femke Heemskerk (52.78)	3:36.26	Italy; Alice Mizzau (55.25); Erika Ferraioli (54.14); Giada Galizi (54.59); Federica Pellegrini (53.65)	3:37.63
4 × 200 m freestyle relay	Italy; Alice Mizzau (1:58.34); Stefania Pirozzi (1:57.63); Chiara Masini Luccetti (1:58.06); Federica Pellegrini (1:56.50)	7:50.53 CR	Sweden; Michelle Coleman (1:57.20); Louise Hansson (1:58.68); Sarah Sjöström (1:53.64); Stina Gardell (2:01.51)	7:51.03	Hungary; Zsuzsanna Jakabos (1:59.25); Evelyn Verrasztó (1:59.69); Boglárka Kapás (1:58.71); Katinka Hosszú (1:56.58)	7:54.23
4 × 100 m medley relay	Denmark; Mie Nielsen (1:00.37); Rikke Møller Pedersen (1:06.07); Jeanette Ottesen (56.15); Pernille Blume (53.03)	3:55.62 ER CR	Sweden; Ida Lindborg (1:01.25); Jennie Johansson (1:06.28); Sarah Sjöström (55.47); Michelle Coleman (53.04); Louise Hansson^{[b]}	3:56.04	Great Britain; Georgia Davies (1:00.00); Sophie Taylor (1:06.97); Jemma Lowe (57.97); Francesca Halsall (53.03); Elizabeth Simmonds^{[b]} Rebecca Turner^{[b]}	3:57.97

^{b} Swimmers who participated in the heats only and received medals.

==== Mixed events ====
Event	Gold		Silver		Bronze	
4 × 100 m mixed freestyle relay	Italy; Luca Dotto (48.78); Luca Leonardi (48.01); Erika Ferraioli (53.83); Giada Galizi (54.40)	3:25.02 ER	Russia; Andrey Grechin (48.76); Vladimir Morozov (48.31); Veronika Popova (53.96); Margarita Nesterova (54.57)	3:25.60	France; Clément Mignon (48.89); Grégory Mallet (48.49); Anna Santamans (54.64); Coralie Balmy (55.00)	3:27.02
4 × 100 m mixed medley relay	Great Britain; Chris Walker-Hebborn (53.68); Adam Peaty (59.30); Jemma Lowe (57.51); Francesca Halsall (53.53); Georgia Davies^{[c]} Ross Murdoch^{[c]} Adam Barrett^{[c]} Rebecca Turner^{[c]}	3:44.02 WR	Netherlands; Bastiaan Lijesen (55.19); Bram Dekker (1:01.66); Inge Dekker (56.81); Femke Heemskerk (52.27); Wendy van der Zanden^{[c]} Ilse Kraaijeveld^{[c]}	3:45.93	Russia; Vladimir Morozov (53.81); Vitalina Simonova (1:07.33); Vyacheslav Prudnikov (52.58); Veronika Popova (53.62); Nikita Ulyanov^{[c]} Grigory Falko^{[c]} Svetlana Chimrova^{[c]} Elizaveta Bazarova^{[c]}	3:47.34

^{c} Swimmers who participated in the heats only and received medals.

=== Swimming medal table ===
Rank	Nation	Gold	Silver	Bronze	Total
1	Great Britain	9	7	8	24
2	Denmark	6	1	2	9
3	Hungary	5	4	5	14
4	Italy	5	1	9	15
5	France	4	4	2	10
6	Sweden	3	6	1	10
7	Spain	3	3	2	8
8	Germany	2	3	1	6
9	Poland	2	1	1	4
10	Serbia	2	0	0	2
11	Russia	1	3	2	6
12	Lithuania	1	1	2	4
13	Belarus	1	0	1	2
14	Netherlands	0	4	2	6
15	Faroe Islands	0	2	0	2
16	Austria	0	0	1	1
16	Belgium	0	0	1	1
16	Finland	0	0	1	1
16	Slovenia	0	0	1	1
16	Ukraine	0	0	1	1
Totals (20 entries)		44	40	43	127

== Diving ==
=== Results ===
==== Men's events ====
Event	Gold		Silver		Bronze	
1 m springboard	Patrick Hausding; Germany	428.65	Evgeny Kuznetsov; Russia	422.40	Matthieu Rosset; France	420.10
3 m springboard	Patrick Hausding; Germany	487.85	Ilya Zakharov; Russia	483.20	Illya Kvasha; Ukraine	477.20
3 m springboard synchro	Ilya Zakharov; Evgeny Kuznetsov; Russia	464.64	Patrick Hausding; Stephan Feck; Germany	435.18	Oleksandr Gorshkovozov; Illya Kvasha; Ukraine	433.98
10 m platform	Victor Minibaev; Russia	586.10	Tom Daley; Great Britain	535.45	Sascha Klein; Germany	530.90
10 m platform synchro	Patrick Hausding; Sascha Klein; Germany	461.46	Vadim Kaptur; Yauheni Karaliou; Belarus	421.80	Oleksandr Bondar; Maksym Dolgov; Ukraine	415.17

==== Women's events ====
Event	Gold		Silver		Bronze	
1 m springboard	Tania Cagnotto; Italy	289.30	Kristina Ilinykh; Russia	288.55	Tina Punzel; Germany	286.70
3 m springboard	Nadezhda Bazhina; Russia	322.80	Tania Cagnotto; Italy	318.25	Nora Subschinski; Germany	317.90
3 m springboard synchro	Tania Cagnotto; Francesca Dallape'; Italy	328.50	Tina Punzel; Nora Subschinski; Germany	313.50	Olena Fedorova; Anna Pysmenska; Ukraine	307.20
10 m platform	Sarah Barrow; Great Britain	363.70	Noemi Batki; Italy	346.40	Yulia Prokopchuk; Ukraine	341.35
10 m platform synchro	Ekaterina Petukhova; Yulia Timoshinina; Russia	314.70	Maria Kurjo; My Phan; Germany	290.01	Villő Kormos; Zsófia Reisinger; Hungary	279.48

==== Team event ====
Event	Gold		Silver		Bronze	
Team event	Viktor Minibaev; Nadezhda Bazhina; Russia	416.90	Oleksandr Bondar; Yulia Prokopchuk; Ukraine	409.75	Sascha Klein; Tina Punzel; Germany	390.95

=== Diving medal table ===
Rank	Nation	Gold	Silver	Bronze	Total
1	Russia	5	3	0	8
2	Germany	3	3	4	10
3	Italy	2	2	0	4
4	Great Britain	1	1	0	2
5	Ukraine	0	1	5	6
6	Belarus	0	1	0	1
7	France	0	0	1	1
7	Hungary	0	0	1	1
Totals (8 entries)		11	11	11	33

== Open water swimming ==
=== Results ===
==== Men's events ====
Event	Gold		Silver		Bronze	
5 km	Daniel Fogg; Great Britain	53:41.4	Rob Muffels; Germany	54:01.8	Thomas Lurz; Germany	54:02.6
10 km	Ferry Weertman; Netherlands	1:49:56.2	Thomas Lurz; Germany	1:49:59.0	Evgeny Drattsev; Russia	1:50:00.6
25 km	Axel Reymond; France	4:59:18.8	Evgeny Drattsev; Russia	4:59:31.2	Edoardo Stochino; Italy	5:08:51.0

==== Women's events ====
Event	Gold		Silver		Bronze	
5 km	Isabelle Härle; Germany	57:55.7	Sharon van Rouwendaal; Netherlands	58:29.9	Mireia Belmonte; Spain	58:41.4
10 km	Sharon van Rouwendaal; Netherlands	1:56:06.9	Éva Risztov; Hungary	1:56:08.0	Aurora Ponselè; Italy	1:56:08.5
25 km	Martina Grimaldi; Italy	5:19:14.1	Anna Olasz; Hungary	5:19:21.0	Angela Maurer; Germany	5:19:21.4

==== Team event ====
Event	Gold		Silver		Bronze	
Team	Netherlands; Ferry Weertman; Marcel Schouten; Sharon van Rouwendaal	55:47.8	Greece; Spyridon Gianniotis; Antonios Fokaidis; Kalliopi Araouzou	56:05.5	Germany; Rob Muffels; Thomas Lurz; Isabelle Härle	56:14.8

=== Open water medal table ===
Rank	Nation	Gold	Silver	Bronze	Total
1	Netherlands	3	1	0	4
2	Germany	1	2	3	6
3	Italy	1	0	2	3
4	France	1	0	0	1
4	Great Britain	1	0	0	1
6	Hungary	0	2	0	2
7	Russia	0	1	1	2
8	Greece	0	1	0	1
9	Spain	0	0	1	1
Totals (9 entries)		7	7	7	21

== Synchronised swimming ==
=== Results ===
Event	Gold		Silver		Bronze	
Solo routine	Svetlana Romashina; Russia	95.8333	Ona Carbonell; Spain	93.7000	Anna Voloshyna; Ukraine	92.3333
Duet routine	Russia; Daria Korobova; Svetlana Kolesnichenko	96.1000	Ukraine; Lolita Ananasova; Anna Voloshyna	92.9000	Spain; Ona Carbonell; Paula Klamburg	92.1667
Team routine	Russia; Vlada Chigireva; Svetlana Kolesnichenko; Anisya Olkhova; Elena Prokofyeva; Alla Shishkina; Maria Shurochkina; Gelena Topilina; Darina Valitova; Liliia Nizamova (reserve); Mikhaela Kalancha (reserve)	96.8333	Ukraine; Lolita Ananasova; Olena Grechykhina; Olga Kondrashova; Oleksandra Sabada; Kateryna Sadurska; Anastasiya Savchuk; Kseniya Sydorenko; Anna Voloshyna; Oleksandra Kashuba (reserve); Dana-Mariia Klymenko (reserve); Kateryna Reznik (reserve); Olha Zolotarova (reserve)	94.0667	Spain; Clara Basiana; Alba María Cabello; Ona Carbonell; Margalida Crespí; Sara Levy; Meritxell Mas; Cristina Salvador; Paula Klamburg; Clara Camacho (reserve); Cecilia Jiménez (reserve)	92.4667
Combination routine	Ukraine; Lolita Ananasova; Olena Grechykhina; Oleksandra Kashuba; Kateryna Reznik; Oleksandra Sabada; Kateryna Sadurska; Anastasiya Savchuk; Kseniya Sydorenko; Anna Voloshyna; Olha Zolotarova; Dana-Mariia Klymenko (reserve); Olga Kondrashova (reserve)	94.4333	Spain; Clara Basiana; Clara Camacho; Ona Carbonell; Margalida Crespí; Sara Gijon; Thaïs Henríquez; Cecilia Jiménez; Sara Levy; Meritxell Mas; Cristina Salvador; Alba María Cabello (reserve); Paula Klamburg (reserve)	93.0333	Italy; Elisa Bozzo; Beatrice Callegari; Camilla Cattaneo; Linda Cerruti; Francesca Deidda; Costanza Ferro; Manila Flamini; Mariangela Perrupato; Dalila Schiesaro; Sara Sgarzi; Alessia Pezone (reserve); Federica Sala (reserve)	90.3333

=== Synchronised swimming medal table ===
Rank	Nation	Gold	Silver	Bronze	Total
1	Russia	3	0	0	3
2	Ukraine	1	2	1	4
3	Spain	0	2	2	4
4	Italy	0	0	1	1
Totals (4 entries)		4	4	4	12

== See also ==
- 2013 World Aquatics Championships
- 2015 World Aquatics Championships
