= Kristina Aidarova =

Russian diver (born 1994)

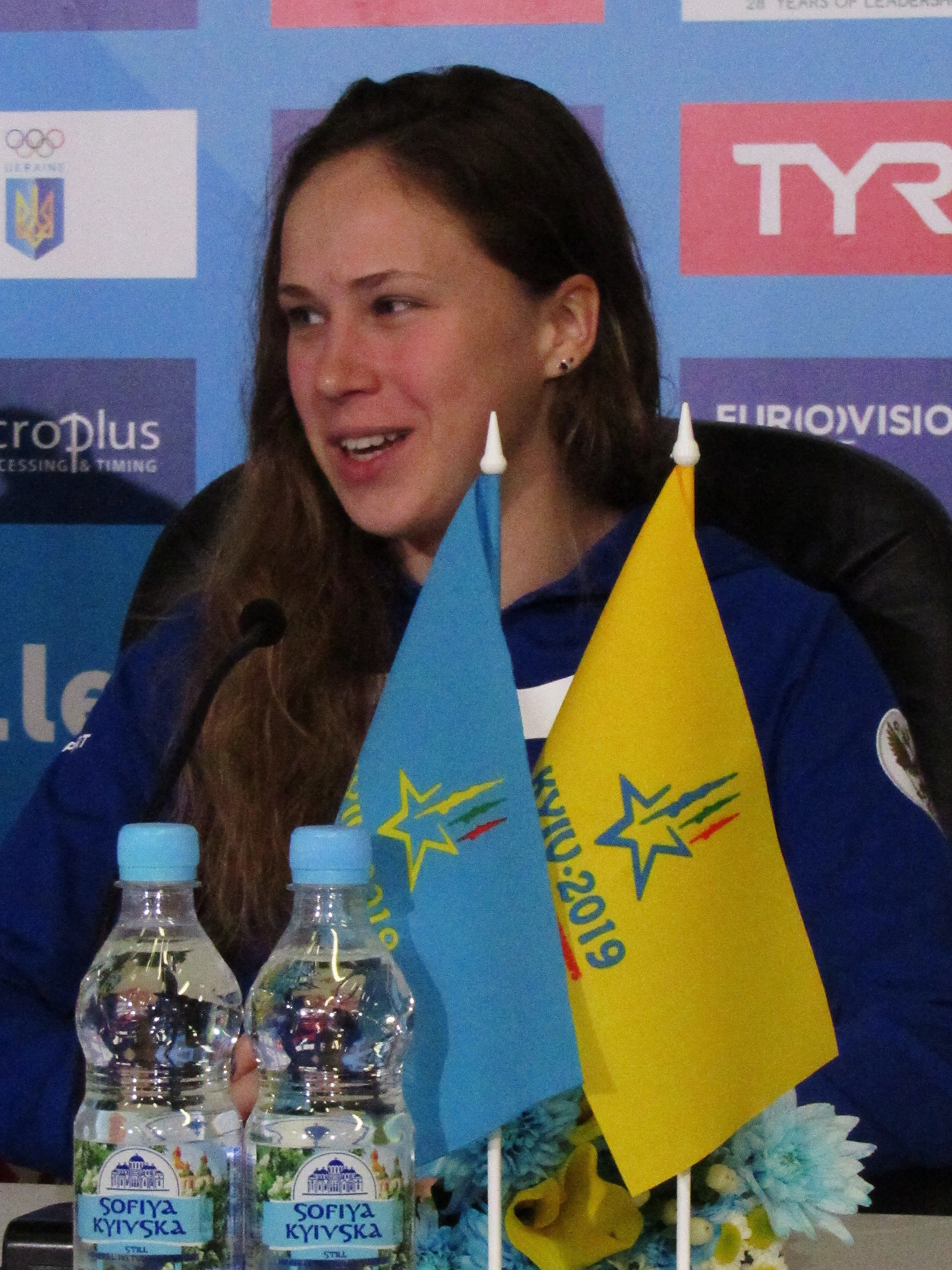
- Ilinykh in 2019

Personal information
- Born: 27 November 1994 (age 31) Ekaterinburg, Russia
- Education: Uralian State University of Physical Culture

Sport
- Country: Russia
- Sport: Diving
Medal record
World Championships
| Bronze medal – third place | 2017 Budapest | 3 m synchro |
European Championships
| Gold medal – first place | 2020 Budapest | Team |
| Silver medal – second place | 2014 Berlin | 1 m springboard |
| Silver medal – second place | 2015 Rostock | 3 m springboard |
| Silver medal – second place | 2019 Kyiv | 3 m springboard |
| Bronze medal – third place | 2016 London | 3 m synchro |
| Bronze medal – third place | 2018 Glasgow | 3 m synchro |
| Bronze medal – third place | 2019 Kyiv | 1 m springboard |
Military World Games
| Silver medal – second place | 2019 Wuhan | 3 m synchro springboard |
| Bronze medal – third place | 2019 Wuhan | 1 m springboard |
| Bronze medal – third place | 2019 Wuhan | 2 m springboard |

Kristina Alexeyevna Aidarova (Russian: Кристина Алексеевна Айдарова, née Ilinykh; born 27 November 1994) is a Russian diver.

She competed at the 2015 World Aquatics Championships, and the 2016 Summer Olympics. She won bronze with partner Nadezhda Bazhina at the 2017 World Aquatics Championships in the 3 m synchronized springboard competition.
