= Tania Cagnotto =

Italian diver (born 1985)

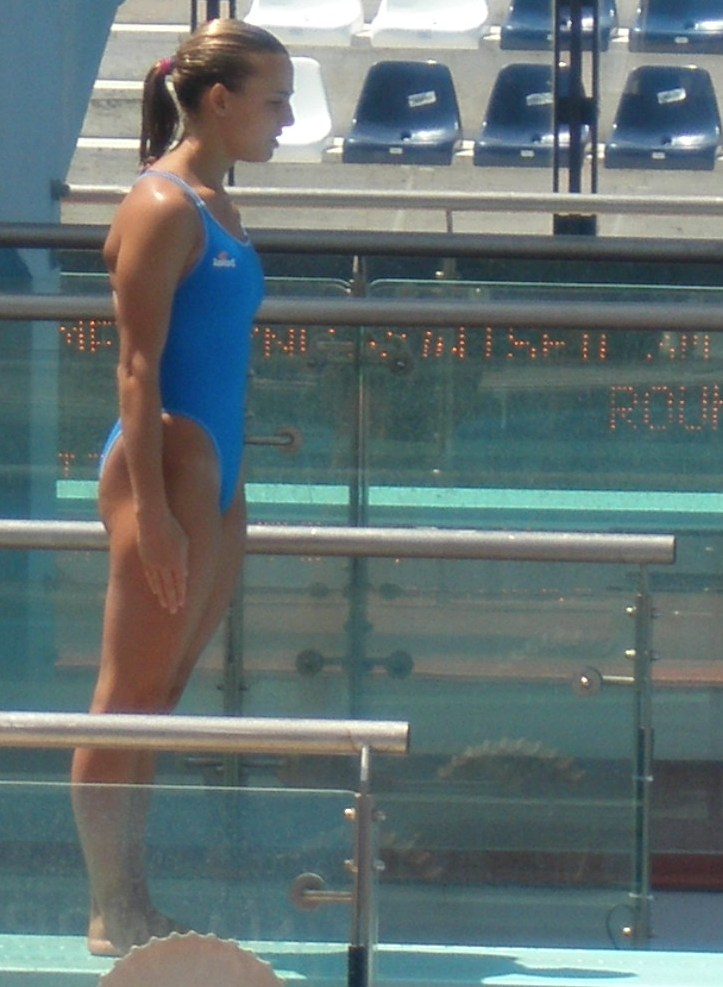
- Cagnotto at the 2009 World Diving Championships

Personal information
- Nationality: Italian
- Born: 15 May 1985 (age 41) Bolzano, Italy
- Height: 1.60 m (5 ft 3 in)
- Weight: 53 kg (117 lb)
- Spouse: Stefano Parolin
- Children: 2
- Parents: Giorgio Cagnotto (father); Carmen Casteiner (mother)

Sport
- Country: Italy
- Sport: Diving
- Event(s): 1 m, 3 m, 3 m synchro, 10 m
- College team: Houston Cougars
- Club: Fiamme Gialle
Medal record
Event	1st	2nd	3rd
Olympic Games	0	1	1
World Championships	1	3	6
European Championships	20	5	4
FINA Diving World Cup	0	0	2
Total	21	9	13
Olympic Games
Silver medal – second place	2016 Rio de Janeiro	3 m synchro
Bronze medal – third place	2016 Rio de Janeiro	3 m springboard
World Championships
Gold medal – first place	2015 Kazan	1 m
Silver medal – second place	2009 Rome	3 m synchro
Silver medal – second place	2013 Barcelona	3 m synchro
Silver medal – second place	2013 Barcelona	1 m
Bronze medal – third place	2005 Montreal	3 m
Bronze medal – third place	2007 Melbourne	3 m
Bronze medal – third place	2009 Rome	3 m
Bronze medal – third place	2011 Shanghai	1 m
Bronze medal – third place	2015 Kazan	3 m
Bronze medal – third place	2015 Kazan	3 m mixed synchro
European Championships
Gold medal – first place	2004 Madrid	10 m
Gold medal – first place	2008 Eindhoven	10 m
Gold medal – first place	2009 Torino	1 m
Gold medal – first place	2009 Torino	3 m
Gold medal – first place	2009 Torino	3 m synchro
Gold medal – first place	2010 Budapest	1 m
Gold medal – first place	2010 Budapest	3 m synchro
Gold medal – first place	2011 Torino	1 m
Gold medal – first place	2011 Torino	3 m synchro
Gold medal – first place	2012 Eindhoven	3 m synchro
Gold medal – first place	2013 Rostock	1 m
Gold medal – first place	2013 Rostock	3 m synchro
Gold medal – first place	2014 Berlin	1 m
Gold medal – first place	2014 Berlin	3 m synchro
Gold medal – first place	2015 Rostock	1m
Gold medal – first place	2015 Rostock	3 m synchro
Gold medal – first place	2015 Rostock	3 m
Gold medal – first place	2016 London	1 m
Gold medal – first place	2016 London	3 m
Gold medal – first place	2016 London	3 m synchro
Silver medal – second place	2002 Berlin	10 m
Silver medal – second place	2012 Eindhoven	1 m
Silver medal – second place	2013 Rostock	3 m
Silver medal – second place	2014 Berlin	3 m
Silver medal – second place	2016 London	Mixed 3 m synchro
Bronze medal – third place	2002 Berlin	3 m synchro
Bronze medal – third place	2004 Madrid	1 m
Bronze medal – third place	2008 Eindhoven	10 m synchro
Bronze medal – third place	2011 Torino	3 m

Tania Cagnotto (Italian pronunciation: [ˈtaːnja kaɲˈɲɔtto]; born 15 May 1985) is an Italian diver. She is the first female Italian diver to win a medal in a World Championship. A five-time Olympian, she won medals in both individual and synchronized springboard diving in her final appearance at the Olympics in 2016. She is also a 20-time champion at the European level.

== Biography ==
Tania Cagnotto was born in Bolzano, the daughter of Giorgio Cagnotto and Carmen Casteiner. Her parents were both Olympic divers, with her father winning four Olympic medals in the 1970s and 1980s.

Cagnotto was sponsored by the sport section of the Italian police force, GN Fiamme Gialle – Bolzano Nuoto.

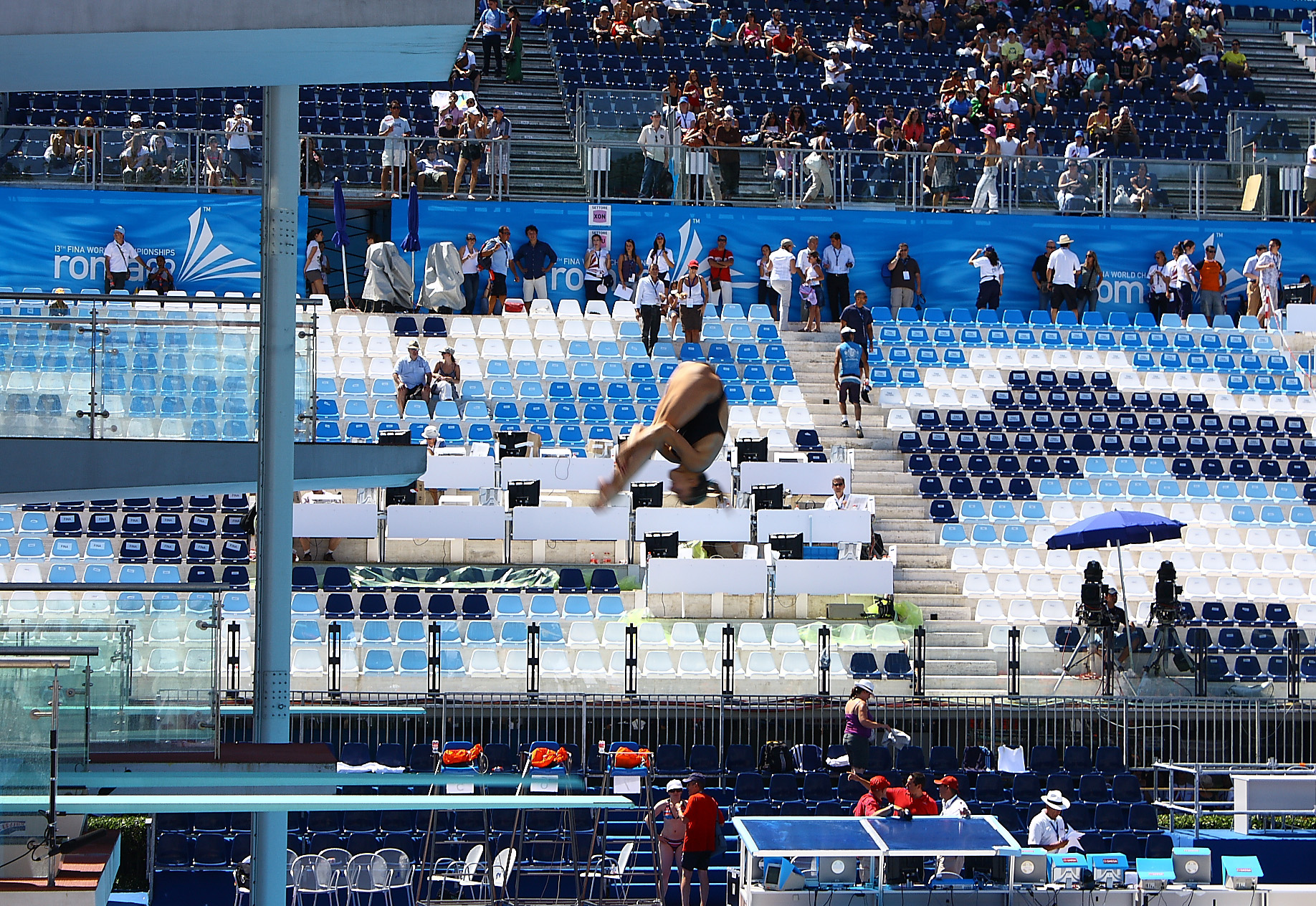
Tania Cagnotto in 2009 World Championship

Cagnotto won her first European gold medal at the 2004 championships in Madrid at the age of 19, winning the 10-meter platform event and also receiving a bronze medal for her performance in the 3-meter springboard competition. After a disappointing performance in the 10-meter platform final round at the Montreal 2005 World Championships, she won the bronze medal in the 3-meter springboard event. Cagnotto won a third consecutive bronze medal in the 3-meter springboard at the Rome 2009 World Championships, after a 4th place in the 1-meter springboard event. Together with Francesca Dallapè, she also won a silver medal in the 3-meter springboard synchronized event.

Cagnotto competed in the 2013 World Championships in Barcelona, getting the silver medal in 1m springboard only 0.1 marks behind champion He Zi. She won the gold medal in the 1-meter springboard at the 2015 FINA World Championship held in Kazan; she was the first Italian female diver to win a World Championship in diving. In the same event, Cagnotto also won the bronze medal in the 3-meter springboard.

Cagnotto announced that the 2016 Summer Olympics in Rio de Janeiro, her fifth Olympic games, were to be her last competitive events. After narrowly missing medals in London, she finally won a silver in the 3m synchro (with her partner Francesca Dallapé) and bronze in the women's 3m.

Cagnotto competed in Torino in 12-14 May 2017 in 1m springboard as her last competition before retirement. She stated that she would coach diving after her ending her competitive career.

== Olympic results ==
Year	Competition	Venue	Position	Event	Notes
2000	Olympic Games	(Australia) Sydney	18th	3 m springboard	
2004	Olympic Games	(Greece) Athens	8th	3 m springboard	
2004	Olympic Games	(Greece) Athens	8th	10 m platform	
2008	Olympic Games	(China) Beijing	5th	3 m springboard	
2008	Olympic Games	(China) Beijing	13th	10 m platform	
2012	Olympic Games	(United Kingdom) London	4th	3 m springboard	
2012	Olympic Games	(United Kingdom) London	4th	3 m synchronized springboard	
2016	Olympic Games	(Brazil) Rio de Janeiro	3rd	3 m springboard	
2016	Olympic Games	(Brazil) Rio de Janeiro	2nd	3 m synchronized springboard	

== Personal life ==
Cagnotto is married to Stefano Parolin. She gave birth in Bolzano to their first child, daughter Maya, on 23 January 2018. In 2021 she gave birth to their second daughter, Lisa.

== See also ==
- Italian sportswomen multiple medalists at Olympics and World Championships

Awards
Preceded by Jessica Rossi; Flavia Pennetta	Italian Sportswoman of the Year; 2014; 2016	Succeeded by Flavia Pennetta; Sofia Goggia
