= Marion Farissier =

French diver

Personal information
- Born: 23 November 1991 (age 33); Écully, France

Sport
- Sport: Diving

Marion Farissier (born 23 November 1991) is a French diver. She competed in the 3 m springboard event at the 2012 Summer Olympics. She also participated at 2 World Championships (2011 and 2013) and 2 European Championships (2010 and 2012).
