= Katja Dieckow =

German diver (born 1984)

Personal information
- Born: 9 September 1984 (age 41) Halle, East Germany
Medal record
Women's diving
Representing Germany
European Aquatics Championships
Silver medal – second place	2008 Eindhoven	3 m springboard
Bronze medal – third place	2008 Eindhoven	1 m springboard
European Diving Championships
Silver medal – second place	2009 Turin	3 m synchro
Bronze medal – third place	2009 Turin	1 m springboard
Bronze medal – third place	2009 Turin	3 m springboard
Bronze medal – third place	2011 Turin	3 m synchro

Katja Dieckow (born 9 September 1984) is a German diver. She competed in the 3 m springboard at the 2008 Summer Olympics and the 3 m springboard at the 2012 Summer Olympics. Dieckow has won a total of two silver and five bronze medals at the European Championships.
