= Francesca Dallapè =

Italian diver

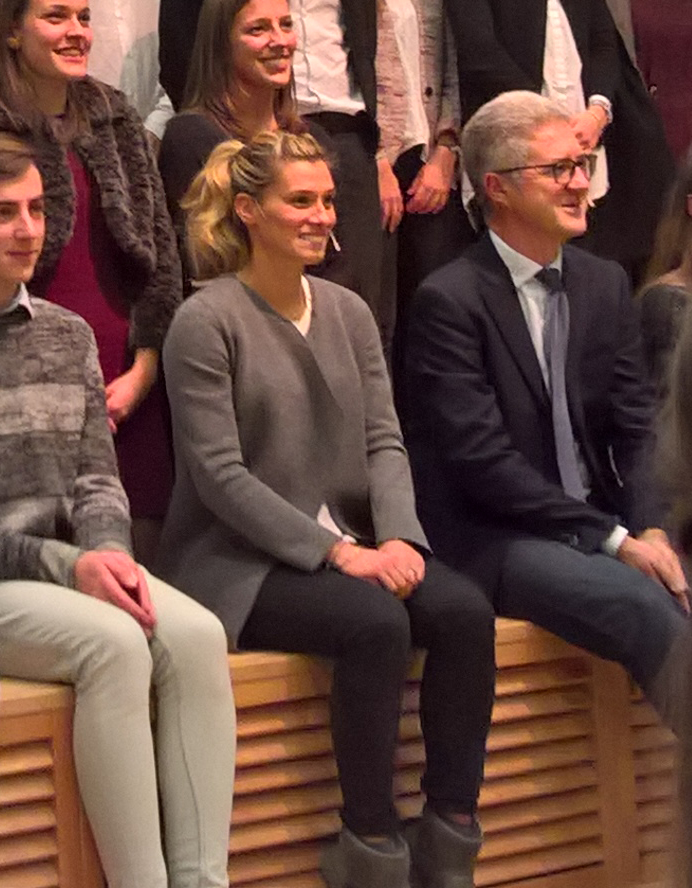

Personal information
- Nationality: Italian
- Born: 24 June 1986 (age 40) Trento, Italy
- Height: 1.64 m (5 ft 5 in)
- Weight: 58 kg (128 lb)

Sport
- Sport: Diving
- Event(s): 3 m, 3 m synchro
Medal record
Women's diving
Representing Italy
Event	1st	2nd	3rd
Olympic Games	0	1	0
World Championships	0	2	0
European Championships	8	0	0
Olympic Games
Silver medal – second place	2016 Rio de Janeiro	3 m synchro
World Championships
Silver medal – second place	2009 Rome	3 m synchro
Silver medal – second place	2013 Barcelona	3 m synchro
European Championships
Gold medal – first place	2009 Torino	3 m synchro
Gold medal – first place	2010 Budapest	3 m synchro
Gold medal – first place	2011 Torino	3 m synchro
Gold medal – first place	2012 Eindhoven	3 m synchro
Gold medal – first place	2013 Rostock	3 m synchro
Gold medal – first place	2014 Berlin	3 m synchro
Gold medal – first place	2015 Rostock	3 m synchro
Gold medal – first place	2016 London	3 m synchro

Francesca Dallapè (born 24 June 1986 in Trento) is an Italian diver. With Tania Cagnotto, she won silver in the 3 m synchronized springboard at the 2016 Summer Olympics.

== Career ==
Dallapè finished sixth with Noemi Batki in the synchronized 3 metre springboard event of the 2008 Olympic Games.

At the 2012 Summer Olympics, Dallapé competed in both the individual 3 metre springboard, finishing in 15th, and the synchronised 3 metre springboard, finishing in 4th place with Tania Cagnotto. At the 2016 Summer Olympics, won silver in synchronized 3 metre springboard with Cagnotto.

== Olympic results ==
Year	Competition	Venue	Position	Event	Ref
2008	Olympic Games	(China) Beijing	6th	3 m synchronized springboard	
2012	Olympic Games	(United Kingdom) London	15th	3 m springboard	
2012	Olympic Games	(United Kingdom) London	4th	3 m synchronized springboard	
2016	Olympic Games	(Brazil) Rio de Janeiro	2nd	3 m synchronized springboard	
