= Olena Fedorova =

Ukrainian diver (born 1986)

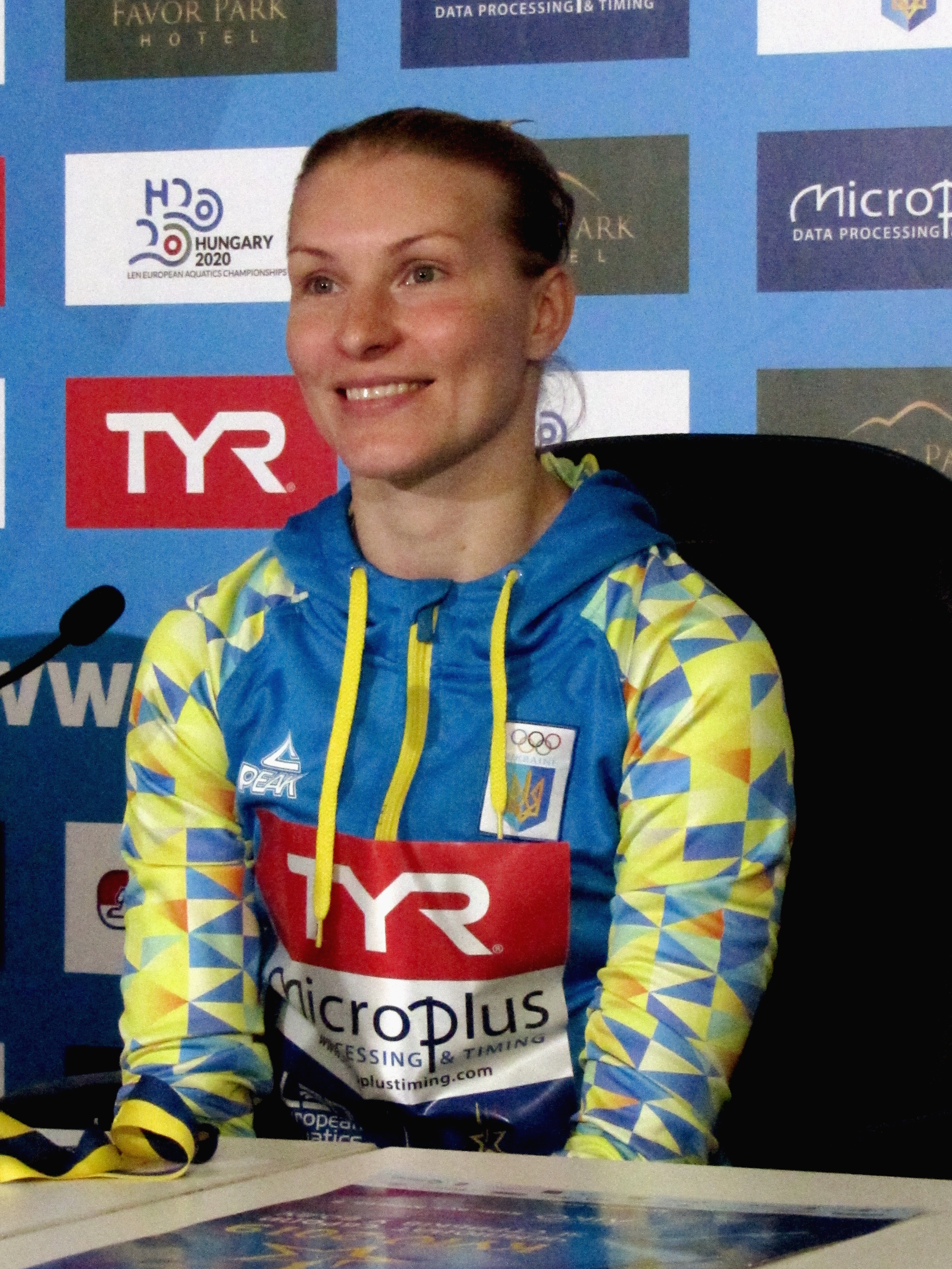

Personal information
- Full name: Olena Olehivna Fedorova
- Born: 14 November 1986 (age 39) Mykolaiv, Ukrainian SSR, Soviet Union
- Height: 164 cm (5 ft 5 in)

Sport
- Country: Ukraine
- Event(s): 3m, 3m synchro
- Partner: Hanna Pysmenska
- Former partner(s): Kristina Ishchenko; Alevtina Korolyova
Medal record
Women's diving
Representing Ukraine
World Championships
Bronze medal – third place	2005 Montreal	3 m synchro
European Aquatics Championships
Silver medal – second place	2010 Budapest	3 m synchro
Silver medal – second place	2012 Eindhoven	Team
Silver medal – second place	2012 Eindhoven	3 m synchro
Bronze medal – third place	2004 Madrid	3 m springboard
Bronze medal – third place	2004 Madrid	3 m synchro
Bronze medal – third place	2006 Budapest	3 m synchro
Bronze medal – third place	2008 Eindhoven	3 m springboard
Bronze medal – third place	2008 Eindhoven	3 m synchro
Bronze medal – third place	2012 Eindhoven	3 m springboard
Bronze medal – third place	2014 Berlin	3 m synchro
European Diving Championships
Silver medal – second place	2009 Turin	3 m springboard
Silver medal – second place	2013 Rostock	3 m synchro
Silver medal – second place	2019 Kyiv	1 m springboard
Bronze medal – third place	2009 Turin	3 m synchro
Bronze medal – third place	2011 Turin	Team
Bronze medal – third place	2015 Rostock	1 m springboard
Summer Universiade
Silver medal – second place	2005 İzmir	1 m springboard
Silver medal – second place	2011 Shenzhen	3 m synchro
World Junior Championships
Gold medal – first place	2004 Belém	3 m springboard
Gold medal – first place	2004 Belém	3 m synchro
Bronze medal – third place	2000 Calgary	3 m springboard
Bronze medal – third place	2004 Belém	1 m springboard
European Junior Diving Championships
Gold medal – first place	2001 Malta	1 m springboard
Gold medal – first place	2003 Edinburgh	3 m synchro
Gold medal – first place	2004 Aachen	1 m springboard
Gold medal – first place	2004 Aachen	3 m springboard
Gold medal – first place	2004 Aachen	3 m synchro
Silver medal – second place	2000 Istanbul	1 m springboard
Silver medal – second place	2003 Edinburgh	1 m springboard
Silver medal – second place	2003 Edinburgh	3 m springboard
Bronze medal – third place	2000 Istanbul	3 m springboard
Bronze medal – third place	2001 Malta	3 m springboard

Olena Olehivna Fedorova (Ukrainian: Олена Олегівна Федорова; born 14 November 1986) is a Ukrainian diver from Mykolaiv.

== Career ==
She has competed at the 2004, 2008 and 2012 Summer Olympics. She competed in the individual 3 m springboard at the 2004 and 2008 Games, and in the individual and synchronised 3 m springboard events at the 2012 Summer Olympics. In the synchronised event, she competed with Hanna Pysmenska.
