= Rebecca Gallantree =

British diver (born 1984)

Personal information
- Born: 19 August 1984 (age 41) Chelmsford, Great Britain

Sport
- Sport: Diving
Medal record
Representing Great Britain
World Championships
Gold medal – first place	2015 Kazan	Team
European Championships
Silver medal – second place	2016 London	3 m synchro
Bronze medal – third place	2013 Rostock	3 m synchro
Representing England
Commonwealth Games
Gold medal – first place	2014 Glasgow	3 m springboard synchro

Rebecca Gallantree (born 19 August 1984) is a British diver. At the 2012 Summer Olympics, she competed in the Women's synchronized 3 metre springboard. With Alicia Blagg, she won gold at the 2014 Commonwealth Games in the women's 3 m synchronised springboard. Rebecca graduated from the University of Leeds in 2005. Rebecca now runs Edinburgh diving club and supports it fully.
