= Flóra Gondos =

Hungarian diver

Personal information
- Born: 11 April 1992 (age 34) Vienna, Austria

Sport
- Sport: Diving

Flóra Piroska Gondos (born 11 April 1992) is a Hungarian diver. She competed in the 3 m springboard at the 2012 Summer Olympics. She also competed at the 2010 European Championships.
