= Anna Pysmenska =

Ukrainian diver (born 1991)

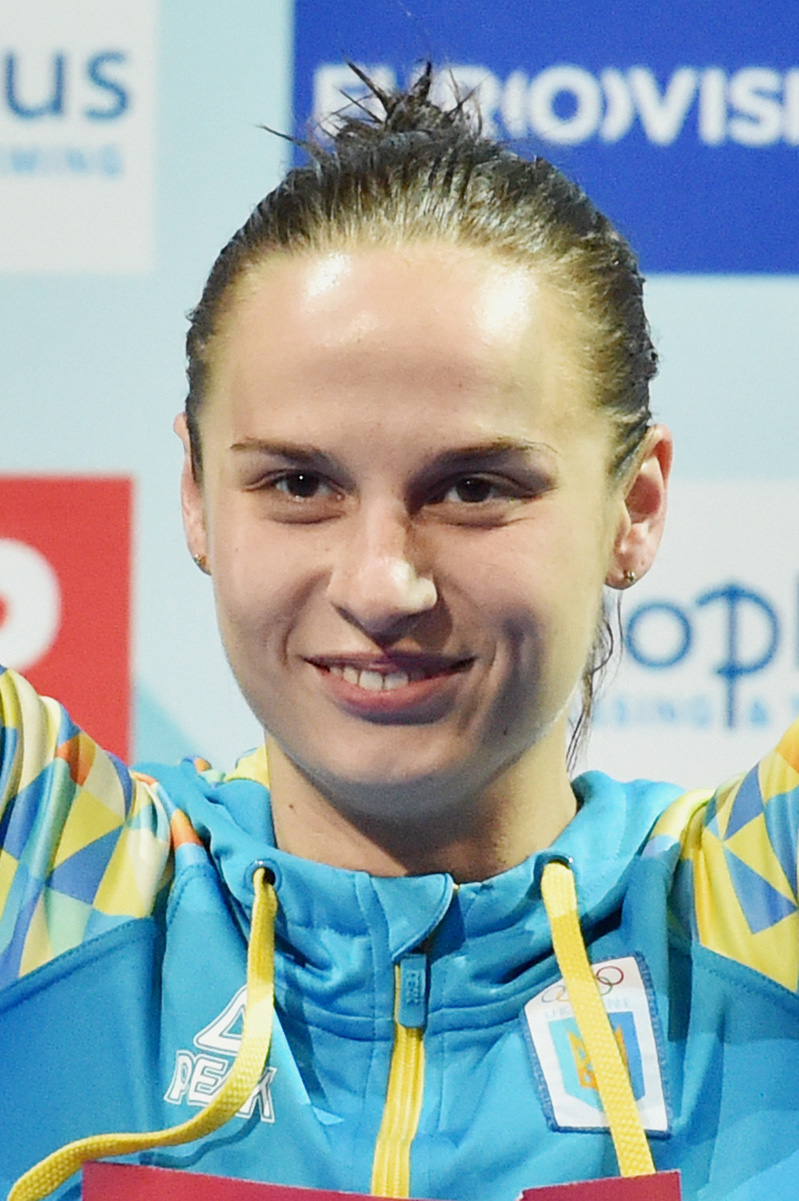
- Pysmenska at the 2017 European Championships

Personal information
- Native name: Анна Сергіївна Письменська
- Full name: Anna Serhiivna Pysmenska
- Citizenship: Ukraine
- Born: 12 March 1991 (age 35) Vinnytsia, Ukrainian SSR, Soviet Union
Medal record
Women's Diving
Representing Ukraine
European Games
Gold medal – first place	2023 Kraków–Małopolska	Team
European Aquatics Championships
Silver medal – second place	2010 Budapest	3 m synchro
Silver medal – second place	2012 Eindhoven	3 m synchro
Silver medal – second place	2024 Belgrade	Team
Bronze medal – third place	2014 Berlin	3 m synchro
European Diving Championships
Gold medal – first place	2017 Kyiv	3 m springboard
Gold medal – first place	2023 Rzeszów	Team
Silver medal – second place	2013 Rostock	3 m synchro
Bronze medal – third place	2019 Kyiv	3 m synchro
Summer Universiade
Silver medal – second place	2011 Shenzhen	3 m synchro
World Junior Championships
Silver medal – second place	2006 Kuala Lumpur	3 m synchro
European Junior Championships
Gold medal – first place	2007 Trieste	3 m synchro
Gold medal – first place	2008 Minsk	3 m synchro
Gold medal – first place	2009 Budapest	3 m springboard
Silver medal – second place	2006 Palma de Mallorca	1 m springboard
Silver medal – second place	2006 Palma de Mallorca	3 m springboard

Anna Serhiivna Pysmenska (Ukrainian: Анна Сергіївна Письменська, born March 12, 1991) is a Ukrainian diver.

== Career ==
Competing as a pair with Mariya Voloshchenko, they finished seventh with in the synchronized 3 metre springboard event of the 2008 Olympic Games, and she also finished in 26th in the 3 metre springboard event. At the 2012 Summer Olympics, she competed in the same events, finishing in sixth in the synchronised 3 metre springboard event with Olena Fedorova and in 21st in the individual event. She is also a European champion (3m springboard at the 2017 European Championships) and multiple medallist. She began diving at the age of 5 and made her international debut in 2007. In 2019, she suffered a severe shoulder injury, missing out on six months of training time.

She competed at the 2024 Summer Olympics where she came 7th in the 3 metre springboard event alongside Viktoriya Kesar.
