= Nora Subschinski =

German diver

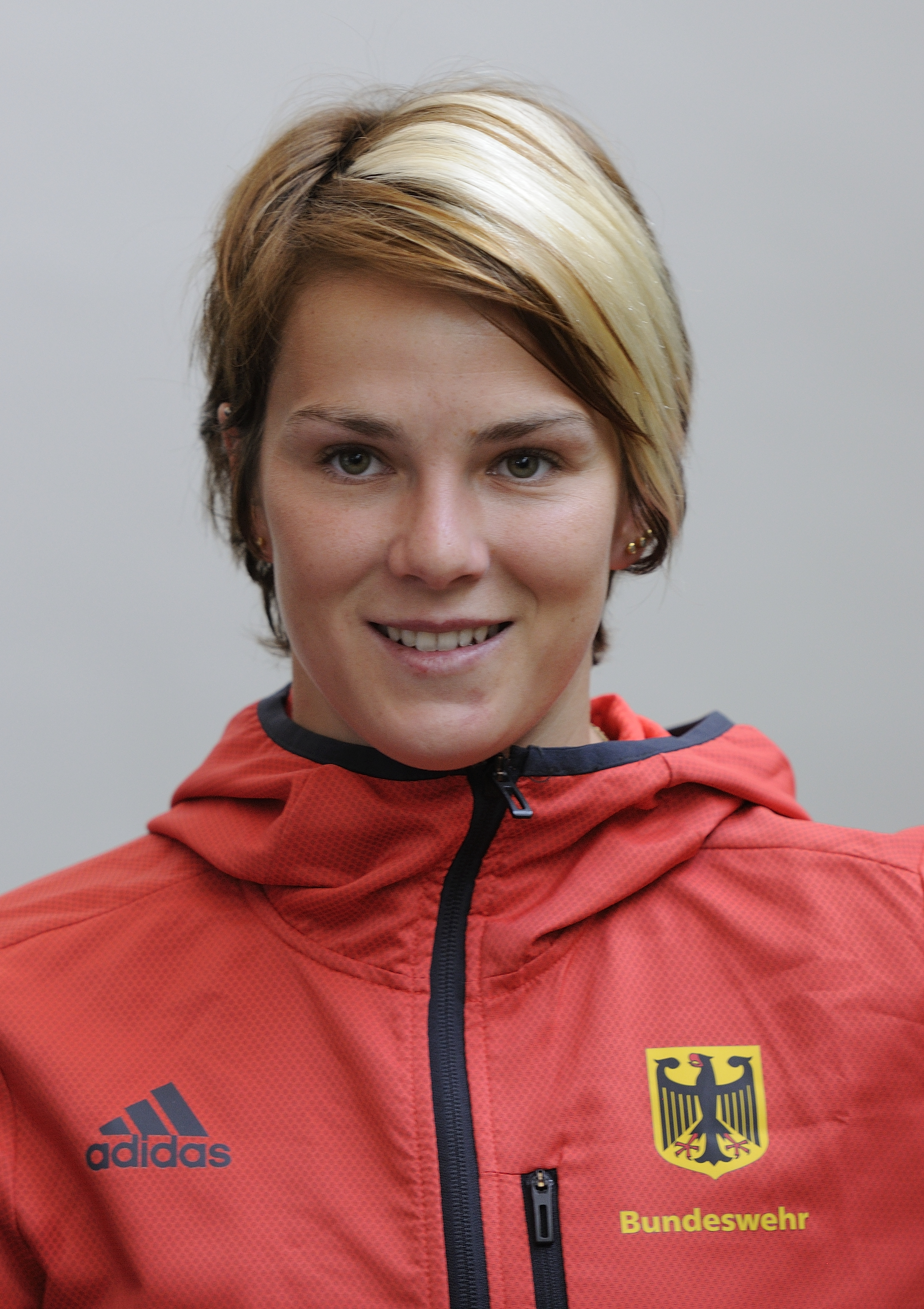

Personal information
- Born: 5 June 1988 (age 38) East Berlin, East Germany

Sport
- Sport: Diving
Medal record
Representing Germany
World Championships
Bronze medal – third place	2007 Melbourne	10 m synchro
Bronze medal – third place	2011 Shanghai	10 m synchro
European Aquatics Championships
Gold medal – first place	2004 Madrid	10 m synchro
Gold medal – first place	2006 Budapest	10 m synchro
Gold medal – first place	2008 Eindhoven	10 m synchro
Gold medal – first place	2010 Budapest	10 m synchro
Silver medal – second place	2014 Berlin	3 m synchro
Bronze medal – third place	2012 Eindhoven	10 m synchro
Bronze medal – third place	2014 Berlin	3 m springboard
European Diving Championships
Silver medal – second place	2009 Turin	10 m platform
Silver medal – second place	2009 Turin	3 m synchro
Silver medal – second place	2009 Turin	10 m synchro
Silver medal – second place	2011 Turin	10 m synchro
Silver medal – second place	2015 Rostock	3 m synchro

Nora Subschinski (born 5 June 1988) is a German diver. She participates in the 3m springboard and 10m platform competitions.

She won the bronze medal at the 2007 and 2011 world championships. She won four gold and four silver medals at the LEN European Aquatics Championships, together with her 24 German championships.

At the 2004 and 2008 Summer Olympics, she competed in the women's synchronised 10 m platform with Annett Gamm. In 2004, the team finished in 6th, while in 2008 they finished in 4th.

At the 2012 Summer Olympics, she competed in the women's 3 m springboard and the women's synchronised 10 m platform with Christin Steuer. She finished in 14th in the individual event, and the team finished in 6th in synchronised event.

At the 2016 Summer Olympics, she finished in 9th place in the women's 3m springboard competition. She also competed in the women's synchronized 3m springboard event with teammate Tina Punzel. They finished in 7th place.
