= Uschi Freitag =

German-Dutch diver (born 1989)

Personal information
- Born: 19 August 1989 (age 36) Maastricht, Netherlands

Sport
- Sport: Diving
Medal record
Representing Germany
European Championships
Silver medal – second place	2012 Eindhoven	3 m springboard
Bronze medal – third place	2011 Turin	3 m synchro springboard
Bronze medal – third place	2012 Eindhoven	3 m springboard
Representing the Netherlands
European Championships
Silver medal – second place	2016 London	3 m springboard

Uschi Freitag (born 19 August 1989) is a German-Dutch female diver. Until 2012, she represented Germany at international competitions, and since 2013 the Netherlands.

She has a German father. She competed at for Germany at the 2011 World Aquatics Championships and later for the Netherlands at the 2013 and 2015 World Aquatics Championships. Her first international medal was at the 2011 European Diving Championships where she won together with the German Katja Dieckow the bronze medal in the 3 m springboard synchro event. A year later at the 2012 European Aquatics Championships they won again the bronze medal in the synchro event.

Both at the 2012 European Aquatics Championships (representing Germany) and 2016 European Aquatics Championships (representing the Netherlands) she won the silver medal in the 3 m springboard event.

She participated in the 2016 Summer Olympics.

== See also ==
- Netherlands at the 2015 World Aquatics Championships
