= Alicia Blagg =

British diver (born 1996)

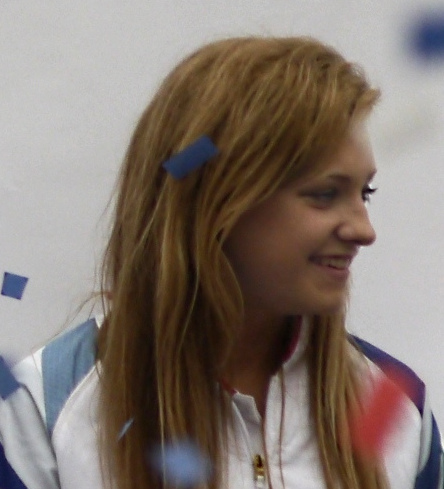
- Alicia Blagg in 2012.

Personal information
- Full name: Alicia Jane Blagg
- Nationality: British
- Born: 21 October 1996 (age 30) Wakefield, England
- Height: 167
- Weight: 60

Sport
- Sport: Swimming
- Strokes: Diving
- Club: City of Leeds club
- Coach: Edwin Jongejans
Medal record
Representing Great Britain
European Championships
Silver medal – second place	2016 London	3 m synchro
Silver medal – second place	2018 Glasgow	3 m springboard
Bronze medal – third place	2013 Rostock	3 m synchro
Representing England
Commonwealth Games
Gold medal – first place	2014 Glasgow	3 m springboard synchro
Silver medal – second place	2018 Gold Coast	3 m springboard synchro
British Championships
Gold medal – first place	2018 Plymouth	3m synchro

Alicia Jane Blagg (born 21 October 1996) is a British former diver.

In 2010 Blagg became the England's youngest ever double national champion when she won both the 1 metre springboard and 3 metre synchronised titles in the British championships. In 2012 she was selected to represent Great Britain in the 2012 London Olympics in the Women's synchronised 3 metre springboard event. In 2016 she competed in 3m springboard synchronized diving representing GB in 2016 Rio Olympics alongside Rebecca Gallantree, and they finished in the 5th place.

According to her instagram profile she is based in Leeds and Miami as of 2017, having moved to America for university.

In July 2020 Alicia announced her retirement from professional diving due to a shoulder injury. She is planning to study for a master's degree in forensic psychology with criminology.
