= FINA Diving World Series =

Annual sporting event

The FINA Diving World Series were a diving competition series held annually from 2007–2022.

This series was held around the world (the final series includes 4 events) where the divers collect points depending on their results to determine the World Series champions. This series was reserved for only the best divers in the World and national wild cards. Most of the divers were medallists from previous Olympics, World Championships and World Cups.

Under World Aquatics, the FINA Diving World Series and FINA Diving World Cup have since been merged into a multi-stop World Cup featuring 1–3 stops and a Super Final. World Aquatics have also introduced Diving Recognised Events, offering recognition of current national and international diving championships as official international competitions, providing opportunities for divers to compete at the international level and qualify for World Aquatics events such as the World Cup.

== List of FINA Diving World Series ==
Number	Year	1st Venue	2nd Venue	3rd Venue	4th Venue	5th Venue	6th Venue	7th Venue
1	2007	(United Kingdom) Sheffield	Mexico City	(China) Nanjing	—N/a			
2	2008	(Mexico) Tijuana	(United Kingdom) Sheffield	(China) Nanjing	—N/a			
3	2009	(Qatar) Doha	(China) Changzhou	(United Kingdom) Sheffield	(Mexico) Tijuana	—N/a		
4	2010	(China) Qingdao	(Mexico) Veracruz	(Mexico) Veracruz	—N/a			
5	2011	(Russia) Moscow	(China) Beijing	(United Kingdom) Sheffield	(Mexico) Guanajuato	—N/a		
6	2012	(United Arab Emirates) Dubai	(China) Beijing	(Russia) Moscow	(Mexico) Tijuana	—N/a		
7	2013	(China) Beijing	(United Arab Emirates) Dubai	(United Kingdom) Edinburgh	(Russia) Moscow	(Mexico) Guadalajara	(Mexico) Guadalajara	—N/a
8	2014	(China) Beijing	(United Arab Emirates) Dubai	(United Kingdom) London	(Russia) Moscow	(Canada) Windsor	(Mexico) Monterrey	—N/a
9	2015	(China) Beijing	(United Arab Emirates) Dubai	(Russia) Kazan	(United Kingdom) London	(Canada) Windsor	(Mexico) Mérida	—N/a
10	2016	(China) Beijing	(United Arab Emirates) Dubai	(Canada) Windsor	(Russia) Kazan	—N/a		
11	2017	(China) Beijing	(China) Guangzhou	(Russia) Kazan	(Canada) Windsor	—N/a		
12	2018	(China) Beijing	(Japan) Fuji	(Canada) Montreal	(Russia) Kazan	—N/a		
13	2019	(Japan) Sagamihara	(China) Beijing	(Canada) Montreal	(Russia) Kazan	(United Kingdom) London	—N/a	—N/a
14	2020	(Canada) Montreal	(Russia) Kazan	(United Kingdom) London	—N/a			
	2021	Not held						
15	2022	(Canada) Montreal	(Russia) Kazan	(China) Wuhan	(China) Zhuhai	—N/a		

== Overall ranking ==
Overall ranking is based on the combined results from the legs of the series. Divers earned points based on placement at each competition. For individual events, points were counted separately for each person. For synchronized events, points were combined for each country – some countries had different pairs compete at the different legs of the series. Medals were not awarded for overall ranking, but top divers (or countries for synchro) who competed in all the legs earned prize money.

=== 2007 ===
Men's events

Event	First	Second	Third
3 metre springboard	Qin Kai (CHN)	Alexandre Despatie (CAN)	He Chong (CHN)
10 metre platform	Zhou Lüxin (CHN)	Lin Yue (CHN)	José Guerra (CUB)
3 metre springboard synchro	Qin Kai & Wang Feng (CHN)	Alexandre Despatie & Arturo Miranda (CAN)	Jorge Betancourt & Erick Fornaris (CUB)
10 metre platform synchro	Lin Yue & Huo Liang (CHN)	José Guerra & Erick Fornaris (CUB)	Thomas Finchum & David Boudia (USA)

Women's events

Event	First	Second	Third
3 metre springboard	Guo Jingjing (CHN)	Yulia Pakhalina (RUS)	Wu Minxia (CHN)
10 metre platform	Chen Ruolin (CHN)	Wang Xin (CHN)	Paola Espinoza Sánchez (MEX)
3 metre springboard synchro	Guo Jingjing & Wu Minxia (CHN)	Yulia Pakhalina & Anastasia Pozdnyakova (RUS)	Briony Cole & Sharleen Stratton (AUS)
10 metre platform synchro	Chen Ruolin & Wang Xin (CHN)	Émilie Heymans & Marie-Ève Marleau (CAN)	Briony Cole & Melissa Wu (AUS)

=== 2008 ===
Men's events

Event	First	Second	Third
3 metre springboard	Qin Kai (CHN)	He Chong (CHN)	Yahel Castillo (MEX)
10 metre platform	Zhou Lüxin (CHN)	Jeinkler Aguirre (CUB)	Thomas Daley (GBR)
3 metre springboard synchro	Qin Kai & Wang Feng (CHN)	Dmitry Sautin & Yury Kunakov (RUS)	Ben Swain & Nicholas Robinson-Baker (GBR)
10 metre platform synchro	Konstantin Khanbekov & Oleg Vikulov (RUS)	José Guerra & Erick Fornaris (CUB)	Thomas Finchum & David Boudia (USA)

Women's events

Event	First	Second	Third
3 metre springboard	Wu Minxia (CHN)	Anna Lindberg (SWE)	Guo Jingjing (CHN)
10 metre platform	Paola Espinoza Sánchez (MEX)	Wang Xin (CHN)	Émilie Heymans (CAN)
3 metre springboard synchro	Guo Jingjing & Wu Minxia (CHN)	Yulia Pakhalina & Anastasia Pozdnyakova (RUS)	Tandi Gerrard & Hayley Sage (GBR)
10 metre platform synchro	Émilie Heymans & Marie-Ève Marleau (CAN)	Paola Espinoza Sánchez & Tatiana Ortiz (MEX)	Monique McCarroll & Sarah Barrow (GBR)

=== 2009 ===
Men's events

Event	First	Second	Third
3 metre springboard	Qin Kai (CHN)	Zhang Xinhua (CHN) Yahel Castillo (MEX)	Not awarded due to tie for second.
10 metre platform	Qiu Bo (CHN)	Matthew Mitcham (AUS)	Tom Daley (GBR)
3 metre springboard synchro	Qin Kai (CHN)	Ben Swain & Nicholas Robinson-Baker (GBR)	Sascha Klein (GER)
10 metre platform synchro	Patrick Hausding & Sascha Klein (GER)	José Guerra & Jeinkler Aguirre (CUB)	Lin Yue & Huo Liang (CHN)

Women's events

Event	First	Second	Third
3 metre springboard	He Zi (CHN)	Sharleen Stratton (AUS)	Kelci Bryant (USA)
10 metre platform	Li Kang (CHN)	Roseline Filion (CAN) Melissa Wu (AUS)	Not awarded due to tie for second.
3 metre springboard synchro	Guo Jingjing & Wu Minxia (CHN)	Yulia Pakhalina & Anastasia Pozdnyakova (RUS)	Briony Cole & Sharleen Stratton (AUS)
10 metre platform synchro	Li Kang (CHN)	Briony Cole & Melissa Wu (AUS)	Roseline Filion & Meaghan Benfeito (CAN)

=== 2010 ===
Men's events

Event	First	Second	Third
3 metre springboard	Qin Kai (CHN)	Yahel Castillo (MEX)	Alexandre Despatie (CAN)
10 metre platform	Qiu Bo (CHN)	German Sanchez (MEX)	Alexey Kravchenko (RUS)
3 metre springboard synchro	Qin Kai & Zhang Xinhua (CHN)	Dmitry Sautin & Yuriy Kunakov (RUS)	Stephan Feck & Patrick Hausding (GER)
10 metre platform synchro	Zhang Yanquan & Cao Yuan (CHN)	Patrick Hausding & Sascha Klein (GER)	José Guerra & Jeinkler Aguirre (CUB)

Women's events

Event	First	Second	Third
3 metre springboard	He Zi (CHN)	Paola Espinosa (MEX)	Jennifer Abel (CAN)
10 metre platform	Chen Ruolin (CHN)	Kang Li (CHN)	Paola Espinosa (MEX)
3 metre springboard synchro	He Zi & Wu Minxia (CHN)	Svetlana Filippova & Anastasia Pozdnyakova (RUS)	Meaghan Benfeito & Jennifer Abel (CAN)
10 metre platform synchro	Chen Ruolin & Wang Hao (CHN)	Roseline Filion & Meaghan Benfeito (CAN)	Monique Gladding & Megan Sylvester (GBR)

=== 2011 ===
Men's events

Event	First	Second	Third
3 metre springboard	Qin Kai (CHN)	He Chong (CHN)	Yahel Castillo (MEX)
10 metre platform	Qiu Bo (CHN)	Sascha Klein (GER)	Tom Daley (GBR)
3 metre springboard synchro	Yahel Castillo & Daniel Islas (MEX)	Patrick Hausding & Stephan Feck (GER) Illya Kvasha & Oleksiy Pryhorov (UKR) Qin Kai & Luo Yutong (CHN)	Not awarded due to tie for second.
10 metre platform synchro	Patrick Hausding & Sascha Klein (GER)	José Guerra & Jeinkler Aguirre (CUB)	Thomas Daley & Peter Waterfield (GBR) Iván García & Germán Sánchez (MEX)

Women's events

Event	First	Second	Third
3 metre springboard	He Zi (CHN)	Jennifer Abel (CAN)	Tania Cagnotto (ITA)
10 metre platform	Chen Ruolin (CHN)	Hu Yadan (CHN)	Paola Espinosa (MEX)
3 metre springboard synchro	He Zi & Wu Minxia (CHN)	Jennifer Abel & Emilie Heymans (CAN)	Svetlana Filippova & Nadezhda Bazhina; Svetlana Filippova & Anastasia Pozdniakova (RUS)
10 metre platform synchro	Chen Ruolin & Wang Hao (CHN)	Roseline Filion & Meaghan Benfeito (CAN)	Melissa Wu & Alexandra Croak (AUS)

=== 2012 ===
Men's events

Event	First	Second	Third
3 metre springboard	He Chong (CHN)	Qin Kai (CHN)	Ilya Zakharov (RUS)
10 metre platform	Tom Daley (GBR)	David Boudia (USA)	Sascha Klein (GER)
3 metre springboard synchro	Illya Kvasha & Oleksiy Pryhorov; Oleksandr Gorshkovozov & Oleg Kolodiy (UKR)	Qin Kai & Luo Yutong (CHN)	Patrick Hausding & Stephan Feck (GER)
10 metre platform synchro	Tom Daley & Peter Waterfield (GBR)	Patrick Hausding & Sascha Klein (GER) David Boudia & Nick McCrory (USA)	Not awarded due to tie for second.

Women's events

Event	First	Second	Third
3 metre springboard	He Zi (CHN)	Tania Cagnotto (ITA)	Wu Minxia (CHN)
10 metre platform	Ruolin Chen (CHN)	Pandelela Rinong (MAS)	Paola Espinosa (MEX)
3 metre springboard synchro	He Zi & Wu Minxia (CHN)	Christina Loukas & Kassidy Cook; Kelci Bryant & Abigail Johnston (USA)	Tania Cagnotto & Francesca Dallapé (ITA)
10 metre platform synchro	Ruolin Chen & Hao Wang (CHN)	Roseline Filion & Meaghan Benfeito (CAN)	Pandelela Rinong & Leong Mun Yee (MAS)

=== 2013 ===
Men's events

Event	First	Second	Third
3 metre springboard	Yahel Castillo (MEX)	He Chong (CHN)	Illya Kvasha (UKR)
10 metre platform	Viktor Minibaev (RUS)	Iván García (MEX)	Lin Yue (CHN)
3 metre springboard synchro	Qin Kai & He Chong; Li Shixin & He Chao (CHN)	Illya Kvasha & Oleksiy Pryhorov; Oleksandr Gorshkovozov & Oleg Kolodiy (UKR)	Yahel Castillo & Daniel Islas (MEX)
10 metre platform synchro	Viktor Minibaev & Artem Chesakov (RUS)	José Guerra & Jeinkler Aguirre (CUB)	Iván García & Adán Zúñiga; Iván García & Germán Sánchez (MEX)

Women's events

Event	First	Second	Third
3 metre springboard	He Zi (CHN)	Laura Sánchez (MEX)	Olena Fedorova (UKR)
10 metre platform	Si Yajie (CHN)	Pandelela Rinong (MAS)	Chen Ruolin (CHN)
3 metre springboard synchro	Shi Tingmao & Wu Minxia; He Zi & Wang Han (CHN)	Olena Fedorova & Anna Pysmenska; Viktoriya Kesar & Anastasiia Nedobiga (UKR)	Cheong Jun Hoong & Ng Yan Yee; Ng Yan Yee & Cheong Jun Hoong (MAS)
10 metre platform synchro	Chen Ruolin & Liu Huixia; Liu Huixia & Si Yajie (CHN)	Cheong Jun Hoong & Pandelela Rinong; Pandelela Rinong & Leong Mun Yee (MAS)	Meaghan Benfeito & Roseline Filion; Carol-Ann Ware & Pamela Ware (CAN)

=== 2014 ===
Men's events

Event	First	Second	Third
3 metre springboard	He Chong (CHN)	Illya Kvasha (UKR)	Jack Laugher (GBR)
10 metre platform	Viktor Minibaev (RUS)	Qiu Bo (CHN)	Tom Daley (GBR)
3 metre springboard synchro	Cao Yuan & Lin Yue; He Chong & Qin Kai (CHN)	Oleksandr Gorshkovozov & Illya Kvasha (UKR)	Stephan Feck & Patrick Hausding (GER)
10 metre platform synchro	Cao Yuan & Lin Yue; Yang Jian & Chen Aisen; Tai Xiaohu & Yang Hao (CHN)	Patrick Hausding & Sascha Klein (GER)	Iván García & Germán Sánchez (MEX)

Women's events

Event	First	Second	Third
3 metre springboard	Wang Han (CHN)	He Zi (CHN)	Tania Cagnotto (ITA)
10 metre platform	Liu Huixia (CHN)	Pandelela Rinong (MAS)	Roseline Filion (CAN)
3 metre springboard synchro	Shi Tingmao & Wu Minxia; Wang Han & He Zi (CHN)	Tania Cagnotto & Francesca Dallapé (ITA)	Jennifer Abel & Pamela Ware (CAN)
10 metre platform synchro	Chen Ruolin & Liu Huixia; Huang Xiaohui & Lian Jie (CHN)	Leong Mun Yee & Pandelela Rinong; Cheong Jun Hoong & Pandelela Rinong (MAS)	Sarah Barrow & Tonia Couch (GBR) Meaghan Benfeito & Roseline Filion (CAN)

=== 2015 ===
Men's events

Event	First	Second	Third
3 metre springboard	Jack Laugher (GBR)	Patrick Hausding (GER)	Cao Yuan (CHN)
10 metre platform	Yang Jian (CHN)	Tom Daley (GBR)	Qiu Bo (CHN)
3 metre springboard synchro	Cao Yuan & Qin Kai; He Chong & He Chao (CHN)	Jahir Ocampo & Rommel Pacheco (MEX)	Patrick Hausding & Stephan Feck (GER)
10 metre platform synchro	Lin Yue & Chen Aisen; Lin Yue & Yang Jian; Tai Xiaohu & Lian Junjie (CHN)	Sascha Klein & Patrick Hausding (GER)	Germán Sánchez & Iván García (MEX)

Women's events

Event	First	Second	Third
3 metre springboard	Jennifer Abel (CAN)	Shi Tingmao (CHN)	He Zi (CHN)
10 metre platform	Tonia Couch (GBR)	Roseline Filion (CAN)	Pandelela Rinong (MAS)
3 metre springboard synchro	Shi Tingmao & Wu Minxia; Wang Han & He Zi (CHN)	Jennifer Abel & Pamela Ware; Carol-Ann Ware & Jennifer Abel (CAN)	Alicia Blagg & Rebecca Gallantree (GBR)
10 metre platform synchro	Chen Ruolin & Liu Huixia; Lian Jie & Si Yajie (CHN)	Roseline Filion & Meaghan Benfeito (CAN)	Cheong Jun Hoong & Leong Mun Yee (MAS)

Mixed events

Event	First	Second	Third
3 metre springboard synchro	He Zi & Chen Aisen; Wang Han & Yang Hao; Lin Yue & He Zi (CHN)	Jennifer Abel & François Imbeau-Dulac (CAN)	Rommel Pacheco & Dolores Hernández (MEX)
10 metre platform synchro	Lian Jie & Tai Xiaohu; Lian Junjie & Si Yajie (CHN)	Meaghan Benfeito & Vincent Riendeau (CAN)	Paola Espinosa & Jahir Ocampo; Alejandra Orozco & Jahir Ocampo; Germán Sánchez & Alejandra Orozco (MEX)

=== 2016 ===
Men's events

Event	First	Second	Third
3 metre springboard	Cao Yuan (CHN)	He Chao (CHN)	Rommel Pacheco (MEX)
10 metre platform	Chen Aisen (CHN)	Tom Daley (GBR)	David Boudia (USA)
3 metre springboard synchro	Oleksandr Gorshkovozov & Illya Kvasha (UKR)	Jack Laugher & Chris Mears (GBR)	Rommel Pacheco & Jahir Ocampo (MEX)
10 metre platform synchro	Chen Aisen & Lin Yue (CHN)	Daniel Goodfellow & Tom Daley (GBR)	Oleksandr Gorshkovozov & Maksym Dolgov (UKR)

Women's events

Event	First	Second	Third
3 metre springboard	Shi Tingmao (CHN)	Maddison Keeney (AUS) Jennifer Abel (CAN)	Not awarded due to tie for second.
10 metre platform	Roseline Filion (CAN)	Tonia Couch (GBR)	Melissa Wu (AUS)
3 metre springboard synchro	Wang Han & He Zi (CHN)	Francesca Dallapé & Tania Cagnotto (ITA)	Viktoriya Kesar & Anastasiia Nedobiga (UKR)
10 metre platform synchro	Si Yajie & Liu Huixia; Liu Huixia & Chen Ruolin (CHN)	Roseline Filion & Meaghan Benfeito (CAN)	Lois Toulson & Tonia Couch (GBR)

Mixed events

Event	First	Second	Third
3 metre springboard synchro	Wang Han & Yang Hao (CHN)	François Imbeau-Dulac & Jennifer Abel (CAN)	Dolores Hernández & Jahir Ocampo (MEX)
10 metre platform synchro	Chang Yani & Tai Xiaohu (CHN)	Meaghan Benfeito & Vincent Riendeau (CAN)	Noemi Batki & Maicol Verzotto (ITA)

=== 2017 ===
Men's events

Event	First	Second	Third
3 metre springboard	Xie Siyi (CHN)	Jack Laugher (GBR)	Cao Yuan (CHN)
10 metre platform	Chen Aisen (CHN)	Yang Hao (CHN)	Tom Daley (GBR)
3 metre springboard synchro	Cao Yuan & Xie Siyi (CHN)	Evgeny Kuznetsov & Ilia Zakharov (RUS)	Jack Laugher & Chris Mears (GBR)
10 metre platform synchro	Chen Aisen & Yang Hao (CHN)	Sascha Klein & Patrick Hausding (GER)	Aleksandr Bondar & Viktor Minibaev (RUS)

Women's events

Event	First	Second	Third
3 metre springboard	Shi Tingmao (CHN)	Maddison Keeney (AUS)	Jennifer Abel (CAN)
10 metre platform	Si Yajie (CHN)	Ren Qian (CHN)	Meaghan Benfeito (CAN)
3 metre springboard synchro	Chang Yani & Shi Tingmao (CHN)	Esther Qin & Anabelle Smith (AUS)	Jennifer Abel & Melissa Citrini Beaulieu (CAN)
10 metre platform synchro	Ren Qian & Si Yajie (CHN)	Nur Dhabitah Sabri & Pandelela Pamg (MAS)	Caeli McKay & Meaghan Benfeito (CAN)

Mixed events

Event	First	Second	Third
3 metre springboard synchro	Li Zheng & Wang Han (CHN)	François Imbeau-Dulac & Jennifer Abel (CAN)	Kevin Chávez & Maddison Keeney (AUS)
10 metre platform synchro	Lian Jie & Lian Junjie (CHN)	Melissa Wu & Domonic Bedggood (AUS)	Vincent Riendeau & Meaghan Benfeito (CAN)

=== 2018 ===
Men's events

Event	First	Second	Third
3 metre springboard	Cao Yuan (CHN)	Xie Siyi (CHN)	Ilia Zakharov (RUS)
10 metre platform	Yang Jian (CHN)	Aleksandr Bondar (RUS)	Nikita Shleikher (RUS)
3 metre springboard synchro	Cao Yuan & Xie Siyi (CHN)	Evgeny Kuznetsov & Ilia Zakharov (RUS)	Oleksandr Gorshkovozov & Oleg Kolodiy (UKR)
10 metre platform synchro	Aleksandr Bondar & Viktor Minibaev (RUS)	Oleksandr Gorshkovozov & Maksym Dolgov (UKR)	Chen Aisen & Yang Hao; Qiu Bo & Yang Jian (CHN)

Women's events

Event	First	Second	Third
3 metre springboard	Shi Tingmao (CHN)	Wang Han (CHN)	Jennifer Abel (CAN)
10 metre platform	Ren Qian (CHN)	Kim Mi-rae (PRK)	Kim Kuk-hyang (PRK)
3 metre springboard synchro	Chang Yani & Shi Tingmao; Chen Yiwen & Wang Han (CHN)	Jennifer Abel & Melissa Citrini Beaulieu (CAN)	Esther Qin & Anabelle Smith; Esther Qin & Georgia Sheehan (AUS)
10 metre platform synchro	Zhang Jiaqi & Zhang Minjie; Lin Shan & Si Yajie (CHN)	Cheong Jun Hoong & Pandelela Pamg (MAS)	Kim Mi-rae & Kim Kuk-hyang (PRK)

Mixed events

Event	First	Second	Third
3 metre springboard synchro	Tom Daley & Grace Reid (GBR)	François Imbeau-Dulac & Jennifer Abel (CAN)	Lou Massenberg & Tina Punzel (GER)
10 metre platform synchro	Hyon Il-myong & Kim Mi-hwa (PRK) Nikita Shleikher & Yulia Timoshinina (RUS)	Not awarded due to tie for first.	Florian Fandler & Tina Punzel (GER)

=== 2019 ===
Men's events

Event	First	Second	Third
3 metre springboard	Jack Laugher (GBR)	Xie Siyi (CHN)	Cao Yuan (CHN)
10 metre platform	Tom Daley (GBR)	Yang Jian (CHN)	Aleksandr Bondar (RUS)
3 metre springboard synchro	China (CHN) Mexico (MEX)	Not awarded due to tie for first.	Canada (CAN) Russia (RUS)
10 metre platform synchro	China (CHN)	Russia (RUS)	Great Britain (GBR)

Women's events

Event	First	Second	Third
3 metre springboard	Jennifer Abel (CAN)	Wang Han (CHN)	Shi Tingmao (CHN)
10 metre platform	Kim Mi-rae (PRK)	Zhang Jiaqi (CHN)	Meaghan Benfeito (CAN)
3 metre springboard synchro	China (CHN)	Australia (AUS)	Canada (CAN)
10 metre platform synchro	China (CHN)	North Korea (PRK)	Canada (CAN)

Mixed events

Event	First	Second	Third
3 metre springboard synchro	China (CHN)	Canada (CAN) Great Britain (GBR)	Not awarded due to tie for second.
10 metre platform synchro	China (CHN)	Russia (RUS)	North Korea (PRK)

== See also ==
- FINA Diving Grand Prix
- World Aquatics Diving World Cup
- World Diving Championships
- World Aquatics Junior Diving Championships

== Works cited ==
- "2007 Results".
- "2008 Results".
- "2009 Results". Archived from the original on 2015-09-24.
- "2009 Results". Archived from the original on 2015-08-19.
- "2010 Results".
- "2011 Results". Archived from the original on 2013-10-20.
- "2012 Results". Archived from the original on 2013-10-20.
