= 2012 FINA Diving World Series =

International diving competition series

The 2012 FINA Diving World Series was the 2012 edition of the FINA Diving World Series. The divers who participated were the current world and olympic champions and runners-up, the top 8 divers in the world rankings and along with some wild cards from either the host nation or from certain countries which had previously qualified athletes for the World Series. This World Series was made up by four legs hosted in different cities: 1st leg Dubai, United Arab Emirates; 2nd leg Beijing, China; 3rd leg Moscow, Russia; and 4th leg Tijuana, Mexico.

== Overall medal tally ==
Rank	Nation	Gold	Silver	Bronze	Total
1	China (CHN)	27	5	2	34
2	United States (USA)	1	6	4	11
3	Great Britain (GBR)	1	5	3	9
4	Mexico (MEX)	1	5	1	7
5	Russia (RUS)	1	3	3	7
6	Germany (GER)	1	0	5	6
7	Ukraine (UKR)	0	3	4	7
8	Canada (CAN)	0	2	3	5
8	Italy (ITA)	0	2	3	5
10	Malaysia (MAS)	0	1	3	4
11	France (FRA)	0	0	1	1
Totals (11 entries)		32	32	32	96

== Dubai leg ==
=== Medal table ===
Rank	Nation	Gold	Silver	Bronze	Total
1	China (CHN)	8	1	1	10
2	Mexico (MEX)	0	2	0	2
3	Ukraine (UKR)	0	1	2	3
4	Malaysia (MAS)	0	1	1	2
4	Russia (RUS)	0	1	1	2
4	United States (USA)	0	1	1	2
7	Great Britain (GBR)	0	1	0	1
8	Canada (CAN)	0	0	1	1
8	Italy (ITA)	0	0	1	1
Totals (9 entries)		8	8	8	24

=== Medal summary ===
==== Men ====
Event	Gold	Silver	Bronze
3 metre springboard	Chong He (CHN)	Ilya Zakharov (RUS)	Kai Qin (CHN)
10 metre platform	Bo Qiu (CHN)	Thomas Daley (GBR)	David Boudia (USA)
Synchronized; 3 metre springboard	Kai Qin (CHN); Yutong Luo (CHN)	Yahel Castillo (MEX); Julián Sánchez (MEX)	Illya Kvasha (UKR); Oleksiy Prygorov (UKR)
Synchronized; 10 metre platform	Yuan Cao (CHN); Yanquan Zhang (CHN)	Oleksandr Gorshkovozov (UKR); Oleksandr Bondar (UKR)	Victor Minibaev (RUS); Ilya Zakharov (RUS)

==== Women ====
Event	Gold	Silver	Bronze
3 metre springboard	Minxia Wu (CHN)	Zi He (CHN)	Tania Cagnotto (ITA)
10 metre platform	Ruolin Chen (CHN)	Paola Espinosa (MEX)	Pandelela Rinong Pamg (MAS)
Synchronized; 3 metre springboard	Zi He (CHN); Minxia Wu (CHN)	Christina Loukas (USA); Kassidy Cook (USA)	Anna Pysmenska (UKR); Olena Fedorova (UKR)
Synchronized; 10 metre platform	Ruolin Chen (CHN); Wang Hao (CHN)	Pandelela Rinong Pamg (MAS); Mun Yee Leong (MAS)	Meaghan Benfeito (CAN); Roseline Filion (CAN)

== Beijing leg ==
=== Medal table ===
Rank	Nation	Gold	Silver	Bronze	Total
1	China (CHN)	8	3	0	11
2	Great Britain (GBR)	0	2	1	3
3	Mexico (MEX)	0	1	1	2
4	Ukraine (UKR)	0	1	0	1
4	United States (USA)	0	1	0	1
6	Canada (CAN)	0	0	2	2
6	Germany (GER)	0	0	2	2
8	Italy (ITA)	0	0	1	1
8	Malaysia (MAS)	0	0	1	1
Totals (9 entries)		8	8	8	24

=== Medal summary ===
==== Men ====
Event	Gold	Silver	Bronze
3 metre springboard	Chong He (CHN)	Kai Qin (CHN)	Julián Sánchez (MEX)
10 metre platform	Bo Qiu (CHN)	Thomas Daley (GBR)	Peter Waterfield (GBR)
Synchronized; 3 metre springboard	Kai Qin (CHN); Yutong Luo (CHN)	Illya Kvasha (UKR); Oleksiy Prygorov (UKR)	Stephan Feck (GER); Patrick Hausding (GER)
Synchronized; 10 metre platform	Yuan Cao (CHN); Yanquan Zhang (CHN)	Thomas Daley (GBR); Peter Waterfield (GBR)	Patrick Hausding (GER); Sascha Klein (GER)

==== Women ====
Event	Gold	Silver	Bronze
3 metre springboard	He Zi (CHN)	Minxia Wu (CHN)	Tania Cagnotto (ITA)
10 metre platform	Ruolin Chen (CHN)	Hu Yadan (CHN)	Pandelela Rinong Pamg (MAS)
Synchronized; 3 metre springboard	Zi He (CHN); Minxia Wu (CHN)	Keici Bryant (USA); Abigail Johnston (USA)	Jennifer Abel (CAN); Emilie Heymans (CAN)
Synchronized; 10 metre platform	Ruolin Chen (CHN); Wang Hao (CHN)	Paola Espinosa (MEX); Alejandra Orozco (MEX)	Meaghan Benfeito (CAN); Roseline Filion (CAN)

== Moscow leg ==
=== Medal table ===
Rank	Nation	Gold	Silver	Bronze	Total
1	China (CHN)	6	1	1	8
2	Russia (RUS)	1	1	2	4
3	Germany (GER)	1	0	0	1
4	United States (USA)	0	2	2	4
5	Italy (ITA)	0	1	1	2
5	Ukraine (UKR)	0	1	1	2
7	Canada (CAN)	0	1	0	1
7	Great Britain (GBR)	0	1	0	1
9	Malaysia (MAS)	0	0	1	1
Totals (9 entries)		8	8	8	24

=== Medal summary ===
==== Men ====
Event	Gold	Silver	Bronze
3 metre springboard	Chong He (CHN)	Evgeny Kuznetsov (RUS)	Ilya Zakharov (RUS)
10 metre platform	Lin Yue (CHN)	Thomas Daley (GBR)	David Boudia (USA)
Synchronized; 3 metre springboard	Evgeny Kuznetsov (RUS); Ilya Zakharov (RUS)	Kristian Ipsen (USA); Troy Dumais (USA)	Oleksandr Gorshkovozov (UKR); Oleg Kolodiy (UKR)
Synchronized; 10 metre platform	Patrick Hausding (GER); Sascha Klein (GER)	Nicholas McCrory (USA); David Boudia (USA)	Ilya Zakharov (RUS); Victor Minibaev (RUS)

==== Women ====
Event	Gold	Silver	Bronze
3 metre springboard	He Zi (CHN)	Minxia Wu (CHN)	Tania Cagnotto (ITA)
10 metre platform	Ruolin Chen (CHN)	Iulia Prokopchuk (UKR)	Hu Yadan (CHN)
Synchronized; 3 metre springboard	Zi He (CHN); Minxia Wu (CHN)	Tania Cagnotto (ITA); Francesca Dallape (ITA)	Keici Bryant (USA); Abigail Johnston (USA)
Synchronized; 10 metre platform	Ruolin Chen (CHN); Wang Hao (CHN)	Meaghan Benfeito (CAN); Roseline Filion (CAN)	Pandelela Rinong Pamg (MAS); Mun Yee Leong (MAS)

== Tijuana leg ==
=== Medal table ===
Rank	Nation	Gold	Silver	Bronze	Total
1	China (CHN)	5	0	0	5
2	United States (USA)	1	2	1	4
3	Mexico (MEX)	1	2	0	3
4	Great Britain (GBR)	1	1	2	4
5	Canada (CAN)	0	1	0	1
5	Italy (ITA)	0	1	0	1
5	Russia (RUS)	0	1	0	1
8	Germany (GER)	0	0	3	3
9	France (FRA)	0	0	1	1
9	Ukraine (UKR)	0	0	1	1
Totals (10 entries)		8	8	8	24

=== Medal summary ===
==== Men ====
Event	Gold	Silver	Bronze
3 metre springboard	Kai Qin (CHN)	Ilya Zakharov (RUS)	Matthieu Rosset (FRA)
10 metre platform	Thomas Daley (GBR)	David Boudia (USA)	Sascha Klein (GER)
Synchronized; 3 metre springboard	Kai Qin (CHN); Yutong Luo (CHN)	Christopher Mears (GBR); Nicholas Robinson-Baker (GBR)	Stephan Feck (GER); Patrick Hausding (GER)
Synchronized; 10 metre platform	David Boudia (USA); Nick McCrory (USA)	Ivan García (MEX); Germán Sánchez (MEX)	Peter Waterfield (GBR); Thomas Daley (GBR)

==== Women ====
Event	Gold	Silver	Bronze
3 metre springboard	Zi He (CHN)	Tania Cagnotto (ITA)	Christina Loukas (USA)
10 metre platform	Paola Espinosa (MEX)	Meaghan Benfeito (CAN)	Nora Subschinski (GER)
Synchronized; 3 metre springboard	Zi He (CHN); Minxia Wu (CHN)	Christina Loukas (USA); Kassidy Cook (USA)	Katja Dieckow (GER); Uschi Freitag (GER)
Synchronized; 10 metre platform	Ruolin Chen (CHN); Wang Hao (CHN)	Paola Espinosa (MEX); Alejandra Orozco (MEX)	Sarah Barrow (GBR); Tonia Couch (GBR)
