= 2011 FINA Diving World Series =

Edition of sporting event

The 2011 FINA Diving World Series is the 2011 edition of FINA Diving World Series. It is the 2011 World Series competition of the world class divers who were champions, runners-up or finalists from the previous World Series, World Championship, World Cup and Olympics. Although that is the case, some of the participants are wild-card entries who represented certain countries which had previously qualified athletes for the said World Series. This World Series was hosted by four countries, namely first leg in Moscow, Russia, second leg in Beijing, China, third leg in Sheffield, Great Britain, and fourth leg in Guanajuato, Mexico.

== Overall medal tally ==
Rank	Nation	Gold	Silver	Bronze	Total
1	China (CHN)	28	11	1	40
2	Mexico (MEX)	2	1	3	6
3	Great Britain (GBR)	1	1	2	4
4	Cuba (CUB)	1	0	1	2
5	Canada (CAN)	0	7	3	10
6	Germany (GER)	0	4	2	6
7	Russia (RUS)	0	2	5	7
8	United States (USA)	0	2	4	6
9	Malaysia (MAS)	0	2	0	2
10	Italy (ITA)	0	1	2	3
10	Ukraine (UKR)	0	1	2	3
12	Australia (AUS)	0	0	7	7
Totals (12 entries)		32	32	32	96

== Moscow leg ==
=== Medal table ===
Rank	Nation	Gold	Silver	Bronze	Total
1	China (CHN)	7	0	1	8
2	Cuba (CUB)	1	0	0	1
3	Germany (GER)	0	3	0	3
4	Russia (RUS)	0	2	2	4
5	Canada (CAN)	0	1	1	2
5	Italy (ITA)	0	1	1	2
7	Malaysia (MAS)	0	1	0	1
8	Australia (AUS)	0	0	2	2
9	Ukraine (UKR)	0	0	1	1
Totals (9 entries)		8	8	8	24

=== Medal summary ===
==== Men ====
Event	Gold	Silver	Bronze
3 metre springboard	Kai Qin (CHN)	Evgeny Kuznetsov (RUS)	Chong He (CHN)
10 metre platform	Bo Qiu (CHN)	Sascha Klein (GER)	Victor Minibaev (RUS)
Synchronized; 3 metre springboard	Kai Qin (CHN); Yutong Luo (CHN)	Patrick Hausding (GER); Stephan Feck (GER)	Illya Kvasha (UKR); Oleksiy Prygorov (UKR)
Synchronized; 10 metre platform	José Guerra (CUB); Jeinkler Aguirre (CUB)	Sascha Klein (GER); Patrick Hausding (GER)	Victor Minibaev (RUS); Ilya Zakharov (RUS)

==== Women ====
Event	Gold	Silver	Bronze
3 metre springboard	Zi He (CHN)	Tania Cagnotto (ITA)	Jennifer Abel (CAN)
10 metre platform	Ruolin Chen (CHN)	Pandelela Rinong Pamg (MAS)	Alexandra Croak (AUS)
Synchronized; 3 metre springboard	Zi He (CHN); Minxia Wu (CHN)	Svetlana Filippova (RUS); Nadezda Bazhina (RUS)	Tania Cagnotto (ITA); Francesca Dallape (ITA)
Synchronized; 10 metre platform	Ruolin Chen (CHN); Wang Hao (CHN)	Meaghan Benefeito (CAN); Roseline Filion (CAN)	Melissa Wu (AUS); Alexandra Croak (AUS)

== Beijing leg ==
=== Medal table ===
Rank	Nation	Gold	Silver	Bronze	Total
1	China (CHN)	8	4	0	12
2	Canada (CAN)	0	1	1	2
2	Germany (GER)	0	1	1	2
4	Malaysia (MAS)	0	1	0	1
4	Ukraine (UKR)	0	1	0	1
6	Australia (AUS)	0	0	2	2
6	Great Britain (GBR)	0	0	2	2
6	Russia (RUS)	0	0	2	2
Totals (8 entries)		8	8	8	24

=== Medal summary ===
==== Men ====
Event	Gold	Silver	Bronze
3 metre springboard	Kai Qin (CHN)	Chong He (CHN)	Evgeny Kuznetsov (RUS)
10 metre platform	Bo Qiu (CHN)	Yuan Cao (CHN)	Peter Waterfield (GBR)
Synchronized; 3 metre springboard	Kai Qin (CHN); Yutong Luo (CHN)	Illya Kvasha (UKR); Oleksiy Prygorov (UKR)	Patrick Hausding (GER); Stephan Feck (GER)
Synchronized; 10 metre platform	Yuan Cao (CHN); Yanquan Zhang (CHN)	Sascha Klein (GER); Patrick Hausding (GER)	Thomas Daley (GBR); Peter Waterfield (GBR)

==== Women ====
Event	Gold	Silver	Bronze
3 metre springboard	Minxia Wu (CHN)	Zi He (CHN)	Jennifer Abel (CAN)
10 metre platform	Ruolin Chen (CHN)	Yadan Hu (CHN)	Alexandra Croak (AUS)
Synchronized; 3 metre springboard	Zi He (CHN); Minxia Wu (CHN)	Jennifer Abel (CAN); Emilie Heymans (CAN)	Svetlana Filippova (RUS); Nadezda Bazhina (RUS)
Synchronized; 10 metre platform	Ruolin Chen (CHN); Wang Hao (CHN)	Leong Mun Yee (MAS); Pandelela Rinong Pamg (MAS)	Melissa Wu (AUS); Alexandra Croak (AUS)

== Sheffield leg ==
=== Medal table ===
Rank	Nation	Gold	Silver	Bronze	Total
1	China (CHN)	7	5	0	12
2	Great Britain (GBR)	1	0	0	1
3	Canada (CAN)	0	2	1	3
4	Mexico (MEX)	0	1	1	2
5	United States (USA)	0	0	3	3
6	Australia (AUS)	0	0	1	1
6	Germany (GER)	0	0	1	1
6	Italy (ITA)	0	0	1	1
Totals (8 entries)		8	8	8	24

=== Medal summary ===
==== Men ====
Event	Gold	Silver	Bronze
3 metre springboard	Kai Qin (CHN)	Chong He (CHN)	Troy Dumais (USA)
10 metre platform	Bo Qiu (CHN)	Liang Huo (CHN)	David Boudia (USA)
Synchronized; 3 metre springboard	Kai Qin (CHN); Yutong Luo (CHN)	Yahel Castillo (MEX); Daniel Islas Arroyo (MEX)	Troy Dumais (USA); Kristian Ipsen (USA)
Synchronized; 10 metre platform	Thomas Daley (GBR); Peter Waterfield (GBR)	Yuan Cao (CHN); Yanquan Zhang (CHN)	Sascha Klein (GER); Patrick Hausding (GER)

==== Women ====
Event	Gold	Silver	Bronze
3 metre springboard	Zi He (CHN)	Minxia Wu (CHN)	Jennifer Abel (CAN)
10 metre platform	Yadan Hu (CHN)	Ruolin Chen (CHN)	Paola Espinosa (MEX)
Synchronized; 3 metre springboard	Zi He (CHN); Minxia Wu (CHN)	Jennifer Abel (CAN); Emilie Heymans (CAN)	Tania Cagnotto (ITA); Francesca Dallape (ITA)
Synchronized; 10 metre platform	Ruolin Chen (CHN); Wang Hao (CHN)	Meaghan Benefeito (CAN); Roseline Filion (CAN)	Melissa Wu (AUS); Alexandra Croak (AUS)

== Guanajuato leg ==
=== Medal table ===
Rank	Nation	Gold	Silver	Bronze	Total
1	China (CHN)	6	2	0	8
2	Mexico (MEX)	2	0	2	4
3	Canada (CAN)	0	3	0	3
4	United States (USA)	0	2	1	3
5	Great Britain (GBR)	0	1	0	1
6	Australia (AUS)	0	0	2	2
7	Cuba (CUB)	0	0	1	1
7	Russia (RUS)	0	0	1	1
7	Ukraine (UKR)	0	0	1	1
Totals (9 entries)		8	8	8	24

=== Medal summary ===
==== Men ====
Event	Gold	Silver	Bronze
3 metre springboard	Chong He (CHN)	Kai Qin (CHN)	Yahel Castillo (MEX)
10 metre platform	Bo Qiu (CHN)	Thomas Daley (GBR)	Rommel Pacheco (MEX)
Synchronized; 3 metre springboard	Yahel Castillo (MEX); Daniel Islas Arroyo (MEX)	Troy Dumais (USA); Kristian Ipsen (USA)	Illya Kvasha (UKR); Oleksiy Prygorov (UKR)
Synchronized; 10 metre platform	Ivan Garcia (MEX); German Sanchez (MEX)	David Boudia (USA); Thomas Finchum (USA)	José Guerra (CUB); Jeinkler Aguirre (CUB)

==== Women ====
Event	Gold	Silver	Bronze
3 metre springboard	Zi He (CHN)	Jennifer Abel (CAN)	Kassidy Cook (USA)
10 metre platform	Yadan Hu (CHN)	Wang Hao (CHN)	Melissa Wu (AUS)
Synchronized; 3 metre springboard	Zi He (CHN); Minxia Wu (CHN)	Jennifer Abel (CAN); Emilie Heymans (CAN)	Anastasia Pozdniakova (RUS); Svetlana Filippova (RUS)
Synchronized; 10 metre platform	Ruolin Chen (CHN); Wang Hao (CHN)	Meaghan Benefeito (CAN); Roseline Filion (CAN)	Melissa Wu (AUS); Alexandra Croak (AUS)
