= 2011 FINA Diving World Series – Moscow Leg =

The 2011 FINA Diving World Series – Moscow Leg is the first of the four legs of the 2011 FINA Diving World Series. It was held from March 18–19, 2011.

Eight gold medals were contested at this competition namely, both men's and women's 3 metre springboard and 10 metre platform, and men's and women's synchronized 3 metre springboard and 10 metre platform.

== Participating countries ==
The number beside each nation represents the number of athletes who competed for each country at this leg of 2011 FINA Diving World Series.

Australia (2)
Canada (4)
China (8)
Cuba (2)
Germany (3)
Great Britain (6)
Italy (2)
Malaysia (2)
Mexico (7)
Russia (10)
Spain (1)
Ukraine (2)
United States (4)

== Medals table ==
Rank	Nation	Gold	Silver	Bronze	Total
1	China (CHN)	7	0	1	8
2	Cuba (CUB)	1	0	0	1
3	Germany (GER)	0	3	0	3
4	Russia (RUS)	0	2	2	4
5	Canada (CAN)	0	1	1	2
5	Italy (ITA)	0	1	1	2
7	Malaysia (MAS)	0	1	0	1
8	Australia (AUS)	0	0	2	2
9	Ukraine (UKR)	0	0	1	1
Totals (9 entries)		8	8	8	24

== Medal summary ==
=== Men ===
Event	Gold	Silver	Bronze
3 metre springboard	Kai Qin (CHN)	Evgeny Kuznetsov (RUS)	Chong He (CHN)
10 metre platform	Bo Qiu (CHN)	Sascha Klein (GER)	Victor Minibaev (RUS)
Synchronized; 3 metre springboard	Kai Qin (CHN); Yutong Luo (CHN)	Patrick Hausding (GER); Stephan Feck (GER)	Illya Kvasha (UKR); Oleksiy Prygorov (UKR)
Synchronized; 10 metre platform	José Guerra (CUB); Jeinkler Aguirre (CUB)	Sascha Klein (GER); Patrick Hausding (GER)	Victor Minibaev (RUS); Ilya Zakharov (RUS)

=== Women ===
Event	Gold	Silver	Bronze
3 metre springboard	Zi He (CHN)	Tania Cagnotto (ITA)	Jennifer Abel (CAN)
10 metre platform	Ruolin Chen (CHN)	Pandelela Rinong Pamg (MAS)	Alexandra Croak (AUS)
Synchronized; 3 metre springboard	Zi He (CHN); Minxia Wu (CHN)	Svetlana Filippova (RUS); Nadezda Bazhina (RUS)	Tania Cagnotto (ITA); Francesca Dallape (ITA)
Synchronized; 10 metre platform	Ruolin Chen (CHN); Wang Hao (CHN)	Meaghan Benefeito (CAN); Roseline Filion (CAN)	Melissa Wu (AUS); Alexandra Croak (AUS)

== Results ==
=== Men's 3 m Springboard ===
Green denotes finalists

Rank	Diver	Nationality	Semi-Final A		Semi-Final B		Final	
Rank	Diver	Nationality	Points	Rank	Points	Rank	Points	Rank
1st place, gold medalist(s)	Kai Qin	China	495.40	1			506.20	1
2nd place, silver medalist(s)	Evgeny Kuznetsov	Russia			442.80	1	505.35	2
3rd place, bronze medalist(s)	Chong He	China			419.85	2	486.00	3
4	Illya Kvasha	Ukraine			403.40	3	485.85	4
5	Troy Dumais	United States	428.25	3			454.35	5
6	Javier Illana	Spain	429.95	2			411.95	6
7	Yahel Castillo	Mexico	422.45	4				
8	Patrick Hausding	Germany			364.05	4		

=== Men's 10 m Platform ===
Green denotes finalists

Rank	Diver	Nationality	Semi-Final A		Semi-Final B		Final	
Rank	Diver	Nationality	Points	Rank	Points	Rank	Points	Rank
1st place, gold medalist(s)	Bo Qiu	China			504.65	2	607.60	1
2nd place, silver medalist(s)	Sascha Klein	Germany			507.50	1	512.05	2
3rd place, bronze medalist(s)	Victor Minibaev	Russia	413.40	2			52.80	3
4	Rommel Pacheco	Mexico			466.65	3	478.95	4
5	Thomas Daley	Great Britain	409.75	3			459.20	5
6	Alexey Kravchenko	Russia	462.00	1			441.20	6
7	Jose Guerra	Cuba			431.45	4		
