= British Diving Championships - synchronised 3 metre springboard diving winners =

The British Diving Championships - synchronised 3 metre springboard winners are listed below.

The championships were not held in 2021 due to the COVID-19 pandemic.

== Past winners ==
Year	Men's champion	Women's champion	Ref
2006	Tony Ally & Mark Shipman	Tandi Gerrard & Hayley Sage	
2007	Tony Ally & Nicholas Robinson-Baker	Tandi Gerrard & Hayley Sage	
2008	Ben Swain & Nicholas Robinson-Baker	Tandi Gerrard & Hayley Sage	
2009	Ben Swain & Nicholas Robinson-Baker	Claire Blencowe & Hayley Sage	
2010	Chris Mears & Nicholas Robinson-Baker	Grace Reid & Hannah Starling	
2011	Chris Mears & Nicholas Robinson-Baker	Rebecca Gallantree & Alicia Blagg	
2013	Chris Mears & Jack Laugher	Millie Fowler & Millie Haffety	
2014	Freddie Woodward & Nicholas Robinson-Baker	Rebecca Gallantree & Hannah Starling	
2015	Chris Mears & Jack Laugher	Millie Fowler & Millie Haffety	
2016	James Heatly & Ross Haslam	Alicia Blagg & Rebecca Gallantree	
2017	Jack Haslam & Ross Haslam	Yasmin Harper & Scarlett Mew Jensen	
2018	Freddie Woodward & James Heatly	Katherine Torrance & Alicia Blagg	
2019	Jordan Houlden & Anthony Harding	Scarlett Mew Jensen & Maria Papworth Burrel	
2020	Jordan Houlden & Anthony Harding	Scarlett Mew Jensen & Maria Papworth Burrel	
2022	Jack Laugher & Anthony Harding	Desharne Bent-Ashmeil & Amy Rollinson	
2023	Ross Haslam & James Heatly	Yasmin Harper & Scarlett Mew Jensen	
2024	Jack Laugher & Anthony Harding	Desharne Bent-Ashmeil & Amy Rollinson	
2025	Jack Laugher & Anthony Harding	Yasmin Harper & Scarlett Mew Jensen	
