= Diving at the 2008 Summer Olympics =

Diving at the Games of the XXIX Olympiad
- Venue: Beijing National Aquatics Centre
- Date: August 10 – 23, 2008
- Competitors: 125 from 30 nations

== Speedy deletion nomination of Template:AquaticsAt2008SummerOlympics ==
A tag has been placed on Template:AquaticsAt2008SummerOlympics requesting that it be speedily deleted from Wikipedia. This has been done for the following reason:

I create a useless page

Under the criteria for speedy deletion, pages that meet certain criteria may be deleted at any time.

If you think this page should not be deleted for this reason, you may contest the nomination by visiting the page and clicking the button labelled "Contest this speedy deletion". This will give you the opportunity to explain why you believe the page should not be deleted. However, be aware that once a page is tagged for speedy deletion, it may be deleted without delay. Please do not remove the speedy deletion tag from the page yourself, but do not hesitate to add information in line with Wikipedia's policies and guidelines. If the page is deleted, and you wish to retrieve the deleted material for future reference or improvement, then please contact the deleting administrator, or if you have already done so, you can place a request here. Legamerprech (talk) 18:31, 25 July 2026 (UTC) Diving competitions at the Beijing 2008 Summer Olympics were held from August 10 to August 23, at the Beijing National Aquatics Centre.

== Competition format ==
The following events were contested by both men and women in Beijing:

- 3m Springboard Synchronized
- 10m Platform Synchronized
- 3m Springboard
- 10m Platform

Individual events consisted of preliminaries, semifinals and finals. The order of divers in the preliminary round were determined by computerized random selection, during the Technical Meeting. The 18 divers with the highest scores in the preliminaries proceeded to the semifinals.

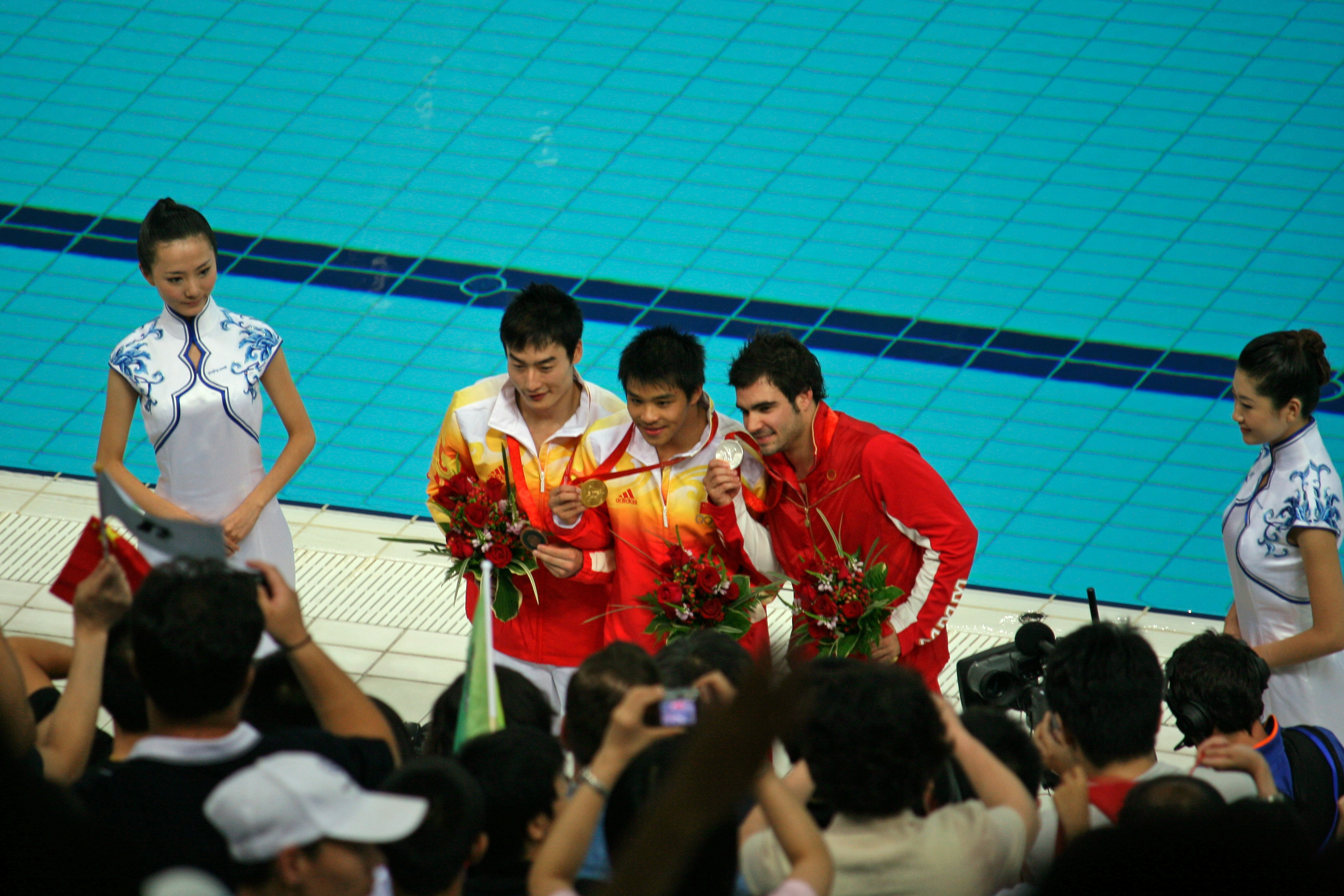
Diving at the 2008 Summer Olympics – Men's 3 metre springboard

The semifinal consisted of the top 18 ranked divers from the preliminary competition and the final consisted of the top 12 ranked divers from the semifinal.

== Competition schedule ==
All times are China Standard Time (UTC+8)

Day	Time	Event
Sunday, August 10, 2008	14:30–15:40	3m Springboard Synchronized Women
Monday, August 11, 2008	14:30–15:40	10m Platform Synchronized Men
Tuesday, August 12, 2008	14:30–15:40	10m Platform Synchronized Women
Wednesday, August 13, 2008	14:30–15:40	3m Springboard Synchronized Men
Friday, August 15, 2008	13:30–16:30	3m Springboard Women (Preliminaries)
Saturday, August 16, 2008	20:00–21:40	3m Springboard Women (Semifinal)
Sunday, August 17, 2008	20:30–22:00	3m Springboard Women (Final)
Monday, August 18, 2008	19:00–22:30	3m Springboard Men (Preliminaries)
Tuesday, August 19, 2008	10:00–11:50	3m Springboard Men (Semifinal)
Tuesday, August 19, 2008	20:30–22:10	3m Springboard Men (Final)
Wednesday, August 20, 2008	19:00–22:10	10m Platform Women (Preliminaries)
Thursday, August 21, 2008	10:00–11:40	10m Platform Women (Semifinal)
Thursday, August 21, 2008	20:00–21:30	10m Platform Women (Final)
Friday, August 22, 2008	19:00–22:45	10m Platform Men (Preliminaries)
Saturday, August 23, 2008	10:00–11:50	10m Platform Men (Semifinal)
Saturday, August 23, 2008	20:00–21:40	10m Platform Men (Final)

== Qualifying criteria ==
An NOC could enter up to 2 qualified divers in each individual event and up to 1 team in each synchronized event.

Qualifying places for each event were awarded as follows:

Competition	Date	Venue	Individual Diving	Synchronized Diving
FINA World Championships	March 17 - April 1, 2007	(Australia) Melbourne	12	3
FINA Diving World Cup	February 19–25, 2008	(China) Beijing	22	4
Host nation	-	-	-	China
TOTAL			34	8

== Participating countries ==
- Australia (9)
- Austria (3)
- Belarus (4)
- Brazil (4)
- Canada (11)
- China (9)
- Colombia (3)
- Cuba (5)
- Finland (1)
- France (2)
- Germany (9)
- Great Britain (10)
- Greece (1)
- Hungary (2)
- Italy (8)
- Japan (2)
- Malaysia (4)
- Mexico (7)
- North Korea (4)
- Philippines (2)
- Romania (2)
- Russia (10)
- South Africa (1)
- South Korea (1)
- Spain (2)
- Sweden (2)
- Ukraine (8)
- United States (12)
- Venezuela (1)

== Medal summary ==
=== Medal table ===
Retrieved from Beijing Olympics 2008 Official Website.

Rank	Nation	Gold	Silver	Bronze	Total
1	China	7	1	3	11
2	Australia	1	1	0	2
3	Russia	0	3	2	5
4	Canada	0	2	0	2
5	Germany	0	1	1	2
6	Mexico	0	0	1	1
6	Ukraine	0	0	1	1
Totals (7 entries)		8	8	8	24

=== Men ===
Event	Gold	Silver	Bronze
3 m springboard	He Chong; China	Alexandre Despatie; Canada	Qin Kai; China
10 m platform	Matthew Mitcham; Australia	Zhou Lüxin; China	Gleb Galperin; Russia
Synchronized 3 m springboard	Wang Feng and Qin Kai; China	Dmitri Sautin and Yuriy Kunakov; Russia	Illya Kvasha and Oleksiy Prygorov; Ukraine
Synchronized 10 m platform	Lin Yue and Huo Liang; China	Patrick Hausding and Sascha Klein; Germany	Gleb Galperin and Dmitriy Dobroskok; Russia

=== Women ===
Event	Gold	Silver	Bronze
3 m springboard	Guo Jingjing; China	Yuliya Pakhalina; Russia	Wu Minxia; China
10 m platform	Chen Ruolin; China	Émilie Heymans; Canada	Wang Xin; China
Synchronized 3 m springboard	Guo Jingjing and Wu Minxia; China	Yuliya Pakhalina and Anastasia Pozdnyakova; Russia	Ditte Kotzian and Heike Fischer; Germany
Synchronized 10 m platform	Wang Xin and Chen Ruolin; China	Briony Cole and Melissa Wu; Australia	Paola Espinosa and Tatiana Ortiz; Mexico

== Qualification summary ==
Nation	Synchronized Diving				Individual Diving				Total	
Nation	Men's 3m	Men's 10m	Women's 3m	Women's 10m	Men's 3m	Men's 10m	Women's 3m	Women's 10m	Quotas	Athletes
Australia	1	1	1	1	2	2	2	2	12	9
Austria					1		1	1	3	3
Belarus					1	2	1		4	4
Brazil					1	2		1	4	4
Canada	1			1	2	2	2	2	10	10
China	1	1	1	1	2	2	2	2	12	10
Colombia		1			1	1	1		4	3
Cuba		1			2	2			5	5
Finland					1				1	1
France								2	2	2
Germany	1	1	1	1	2	2	2	2	12	14
Great Britain	1	1	1	1	1	2	1	2	10	10
Greece								1	1	1
Hungary							2		2	2
Italy			1		2	1	2	2	8	8
Japan					1			1	2	2
Malaysia						1	2	1	4	4
Mexico				1	1	2	2	2	8	7
North Korea				1		1		2	4	3
Philippines						1	1		2	2
Romania						1		1	2	2
Russia	1	1	1		2	2	2	1	10	10
South Africa							1		1	1
South Korea					1				1	1
Spain					1		1		2	2
Sweden							1	1	2	2
Ukraine	1		1		2	2	2	1	9	9
United States	1	1	1	1	2	2	2	2	12	12
Venezuela					1				1	1
Total: 29 NOCs	8	8	8	8	29	30	30	29	150	136

== See also ==
- Diving at the 2007 Pan American Games
