= British Diving Championships - 1 metre springboard diving winners =

The British Diving Championships - 1 metre springboard winners are listed below.

The championships were not held in 2021 due to the COVID-19 pandemic.

== Past winners ==
Year	Men's champion	Women's champion	Ref
2006	Ben Swain	Tandi Gerrard	
2007	Ben Swain	Jodie McGroarty	
2008	Oliver Dingley	Katie Hamilton	
2009	Oliver Dingley	Rebecca Gallantree	
2010	Nicholas Robinson-Baker	Alicia Blagg	
2011	Oliver Dingley	Rhea Gayle	
2013	Oliver Dingley	Alicia Blagg	
2014	Freddie Woodward	Rhea Gayle	
2015	Jack Haslam	Rhea Gayle	
2018	Freddie Woodward	Katherine Torrance	
2019	James Heatly	Katherine Torrance	
2020	Jordan Houlden	Yasmin Harper	
2021	not held due to Covid-19		
2022	Jack Laugher	Yasmin Harper	
2023	Ross Haslam	Yasmin Harper	
2024	not held		
2025	Ross Haslam	Tilly Brown	
