= Diving at the 2019 Pan American Games – Men's 3 metre springboard =

Men's 3 metre springboard at the 2019 Pan American Games
- Venue: Aquatics Centre
- Dates: August 3–4
- Competitors: 19 from 11 nations
- Winning score: 468.10

Medalists
Gold medal	Daniel Restrepo	Colombia
Silver medal	Juan Celaya	Mexico
Bronze medal	Philippe Gagné	Canada

The men's 3 metre springboard competition of the diving events at the 2019 Pan American Games was held on 3–4 August at the Aquatics Centre in Lima, Peru.

== Schedule ==
Date	Time	Round
August 3, 2019	10:00	Preliminary
August 4, 2019	19:00	Final

== Results ==
Green denotes finalists

Rank	Diver	Nationality	Preliminary		Final	
Rank	Diver	Nationality	Points	Rank	Points	Rank
1st place, gold medalist(s)	Daniel Restrepo	Colombia	443.60	2	468.10	1
2nd place, silver medalist(s)	Juan Celaya	Mexico	381.05	11	454.30	2
3rd place, bronze medalist(s)	Philippe Gagné	Canada	444.95	1	448.65	3
4	Rafael Quintero	Puerto Rico	412.45	4	440.10	4
5	Yona Knight-Wisdom	Jamaica	405.95	5	437.65	5
6	Andrew Capobianco	United States	430.40	3	431.85	6
7	Ian Matos	Brazil	381.15	10	418.90	7
8	Jonathan Ruvalcaba	Dominican Republic	386.60	8	405.80	8
9	Sebastián Morales	Colombia	388.60	7	399.95	9
10	Angello Alcebo	Cuba	374.75	12	398.50	10
11	Michael Hixon	United States	394.80	6	358.95	11
12	Luis Bonfim	Brazil	385.75	9	353.55	12
13	Yahel Castillo	Mexico	368.40	13		
14	François Imbeau-Dulac	Canada	365.15	14		
15	Donato Neglia	Chile	363.40	15		
16	Diego Carquin	Chile	344.55	16		
17	Laydel Domínguez	Cuba	330.70	17		
18	Daniel Pinto	Peru	321.60	18		
19	Frandiel Gómez	Dominican Republic	314.40	19		
