= Diving at the 2013 Canada Summer Games =

Diving at the 2013 Canada Summer Games was in Sherbrooke, Quebec at the Universite de Sherbrooke. It was held from 4 to 17 August. There were four diving events.

== Medal table ==
The following is the medal table for diving at the 2013 Canada Summer Games.

* Host nation (Host)

Rank	Nation	Gold	Silver	Bronze	Total
1	Quebec*	7	6	3	16
2	British Columbia	1	0	2	3
3	Alberta	0	2	2	4
4	Ontario	0	0	1	1
Totals (4 entries)		8	8	8	24

== Diving ==
=== Men's ===
Event	Gold		Silver		Bronze	
Springboard 1 m	Nicholas Beaupré; Quebec	415.95	Vincent Riendeau; Quebec	401.40	Tyler Henschel; Alberta	376.15
Springboard 3 m	Philippe Gagné; Quebec	435.65	Dylan Grissel; Ontario	387.10	Nicholas Beaupré; Quebec	386.50
Synchro springboard 3 m	Quebec; Nicholas Beaupré; Vincent Riendeau	378.63	Alberta; Tyler Henschel; Brent Sagert	377.76	Quebec; Philippe Gagné; Félix Leathead	369.87
Platform 10 m	Philippe Gagné; Quebec	414.5	Vincent Riendeau; Quebec	387.55	Nicholas Beaupré; Quebec	382.95

=== Women's ===
Event	Gold		Silver		Bronze	
Springboard 1 m	Éloïse Bélanger; Quebec	275.65	Mélissa Citrini Beaulieu; Quebec	262.05	Courtney Hattie; British Columbia	258.95
Springboard 3 m	Courney Hattie; British Columbia	315.15	Éloïse Bélanger; Quebec	311.50	Caeli McKay; Alberta	295.85
Synchro springboard 3 m	Quebec; Éloïse Bélanger; Samantha Maiorino	296.58	Quebec; Mélissa Citrini Beaulieu; Frédérique Lalonde	276.78	British Columbia; Courtney Hattie; Madeline Nicole Wainman	271.71
Platform 10 m	Éloïse Bélanger; Quebec	342.10	Caeli McKay; Alberta	303.45	Frédérique Lalonde; Quebec	292.80
