= Diving at the 2015 Pan American Games – Men's 3 metre springboard =

Men's 3 metre springboard at the 2015 Pan American Games
- Venue: CIBC Pan Am/Parapan Am Aquatics Centre and Field House
- Dates: July 10 - July 11
- Competitors: 20 from 12 nations
- Winning score: 483.35

Medalists
Gold medal	Rommel Pacheco	Mexico
Silver medal	Jahir Ocampo	Mexico
Bronze medal	Philippe Gagné	Canada

The men's 3 metre springboard competition of the diving events at the 2015 Pan American Games was held between the 10 and 11 of July at the CIBC Pan Am/Parapan Am Aquatics Centre and Field House in Toronto, Canada. The winner of the competition qualified his country a quota place for the 2016 Summer Olympics in Rio de Janeiro, Brazil. If the host nation of the Games wins the event, the runner up will qualify instead.

The individual diving competitions all consist of two rounds. In the first, the divers each perform five dives. The best 12 divers in the preliminaries advance to the final. In the final round, the divers perform a final set of five dives, with the scores from those dives (and only those dives) used to determine final ranking.

Seven judges evaluate each dive, giving the diver a score between 0 and 10 with increments of 0.5; scores below 7.0 or above 9.5 are rare. The two highest and two lowest scores from each judge are dropped. The remaining three scores are summed, and multiplied by the degree of difficulty of the dive to give the total score for the dive. Scores from each dive in the round are summed to give the round score.

== Schedule ==
Date	Time	Round
July 10, 2015	10:00	Preliminary
July 11, 2015	18:00	Final

== Results ==
Green denotes finalists

Rank	Diver	Nationality	Preliminary		Final	
Rank	Diver	Nationality	Points	Rank	Points	Rank
1st place, gold medalist(s)	Rommel Pacheco	Mexico	466.35	1	483.35	1
2nd place, silver medalist(s)	Jahir Ocampo	Mexico	383.35	6	442.15	2
3rd place, bronze medalist(s)	Philippe Gagné	Canada	362.80	8	421.20	3
4	César Castro	Brazil	404.85	3	411.55	4
5	Rafael Quintero	Puerto Rico	350.15	10	409.00	5
6	François Imbeau-Dulac	Canada	406.95	2	398.40	6
7	Sebastián Villa	Colombia	345.15	11	397.40	7
8	Donato Neglia	Chile	370.10	7	392.35	8
9	Sebastián Morales	Colombia	391.35	4	380.20	9
10	Yona Knight-Wisdom	Jamaica	362.50	9	380.00	10
11	Zachary Nees	United States	327.65	12	367.70	11
12	Alfredo Colmenarez	Venezuela	384.95	5	359.20	12
13	Ian Matos	Brazil	327.05	13	—	
14	Cory Bowersox	United States	321.35	14	—	
15	Robert Páez	Venezuela	320.80	15	—	
16	Frandiel Gomez	Dominican Republic	311.05	16	—	
17	Diego Carquin	Chile	297.55	17	—	
18	Daniel Pinto	Peru	267.90	18	—	
19	Adrian Infante	Peru	266.65	19	—	
20	Jonatan Posligua	Ecuador	226.70	20	—	

=== Detailed Results ===
==== Preliminary ====
Rank	Diver	Nationality	Preliminary											
Rank	Diver	Nationality	Dive 1	Rank	Dive 2	Rank	Dive 3	Rank	Dive 4	Rank	Dive 5	Rank	Dive 6	Grand Total
1	Rommel Pacheco	Mexico	83.30	1	149.30 (66.00)	1	237.70 (88.40)	1	308.65 (70.95)	1	375.15 (66.50)	1	91.20	466.35
2	François Imbeau-Dulac	Canada	67.50	4	135.70 (68.20)	4	183.70 (48.00)	8	255.45 (71.75)	6	328.95 (73.50)	3	78.00	406.95
3	César Castro	Brazil	72.00	2	144.00 (72.00)	2	210.65 (66.65)	2	273.65 (63.00)	2	335.15 (61.50)	2	69.70	404.85
4	Sebastián Morales	Colombia	58.90	13	125.20 (66.30)	7	196.95 (71.75)	4	248.25 (51.30)	7	314.85 (66.60)	6	76.50	391.35
5	Alfredo Colmenarez	Venezuela	63.00	7	132.75 (69.75)	5	186.75 (54.00)	6	255.75 (69.00)	4	322.05 (66.30)	5	62.90	384.95
6	Jahir Ocampo	Mexico	59.50	12	132.60 (73.10)	6	191.10 (58.50)	5	233.10 (42.00)	9	307.35 (74.25)	7	76.00	383.35
7	Donato Neglia	Chile	63.00	7	120.35 (57.35)	9	186.65 (66.30)	7	256.35 (69.70)	3	324.60 (52.50)	4	52.50	377.10
8	Philippe Gagné	Canada	60.00	10	100.30 (40.30)	16	159.80 (59.50)	13	212.30 (52.50)	13	278.80 (66.50)	10	84.00	362.80
9	Yona Knight-Wisdom	Jamaica	60.00	10	120.45 (60.45)	8	179.95 (59.50)	9	238.45 (58.50)	8	296.20 (57.75)	9	66.30	362.50
10	Rafael Quintero	Puerto Rico	69.75	3	137.25 (67.50)	3	200.15 (62.90)	3	255.65 (55.50)	5	305.15 (49.50)	8	45.00	350.15
11	Sebastián Villa	Colombia	63.00	7	101.00 (38.00)	15	144.20 (43.20)	16	215.95 (71.75)	12	272.05 (56.10)	12	73.10	345.15
12	Zachary Nees	United States	65.10	5	91.35 (26.25)	18	134.55 (43.20)	18	187.25 (52.70)	17	261.35 (74.10)	13	66.30	327.65
13	Ian Matos	Brazil	45.00	17	102.00 (57.00)	14	153.00 (51.00)	15	199.20 (46.20)	16	260.40 (61.20)	14	66.65	327.05
14	Cory Bowersox	United States	65.10	5	114.60 (49.50)	11	158.35 (43.75)	14	224.65 (66.30)	10	255.05 (30.40)	17	66.30	321.35
15	Robert Páez	Venezuela	55.50	14	115.95 (60.45)	10	169.69 (54.00)	10	208.45 (38.50)	14	259.60 (51.15)	15	61.20	320.80
16	Frandiel Gomez	Dominican Republic	51.15	15	102.15 (51.00)	13	163.65 (61.50)	12	201.15 (37.50)	15	256.65 (55.50)	16	54.40	311.05
17	Diego Carquin	Chile	51.00	16	108.35 (57.35)	12	164.45 (56.10)	11	216.95 (52.50)	11	275.45 (58.50)	11	22.10	297.55
18	Daniel Pinto	Peru	32.40	20	75.60 (43.20)	19	126.00 (50.40)	19	168.00 (42.00)	19	218.40 (50.40)	19	49.50	267.90
19	Adrian Infante	Peru	43.20	18	100.20 (57.00)	17	140.70 (40.50)	17	167.70 (27.00)	19	220.35 (52.65)	18	46.20	266.65
20	Jonatan Posligua	Ecuador	43.20	18	68.40 (25.20)	20	102.90 (34.50)	20	142.10 (39.20)	20	190.70 (48.60)	20	36.00	226.70

==== Final ====
Rank	Diver	Nationality	Final											
Rank	Diver	Nationality	Dive 1	Rank	Dive 2	Rank	Dive 3	Rank	Dive 4	Rank	Dive 5	Rank	Dive 6	Grand Total
1st place, gold medalist(s)	Rommel Pacheco	Mexico	56.10	12	135.60 (79.50)	8	224.00 (88.40)	3	314.75 (90.75)	1	409.25 (94.50)	1	74.10	466.35
2nd place, silver medalist(s)	Jahir Ocampo	Mexico	66.30	8	139.40 (73.10)	5	212.90 (73.50)	4	289.90 (77.00)	2	350.95 (61.05)	2	91.20	442.15
3rd place, bronze medalist(s)	Philippe Gagné	Canada	69.00	4	148.05 (79.05)	1	227.95 (79.90)	2	286.45 (58.50)	3	331.95 (45.50)	6	89.25	421.20
4	César Castro	Brazil	61.50	10	133.50 (72.00)	10	203.25 (69.75)	7	270.75 (67.50)	6	336.75 (66.00)	4	74.80	411.55
5	Rafael Quintero	Puerto Rico	68.20	6	140.20 (72.00)	4	206.50 (66.30)	6	269.50 (63.00)	7	337.00 (67.50)	3	72.00	409.00
6	François Imbeau-Dulac	Canada	69.00	4	138.75 (69.75)	6	195.75 (57.00)	10	234.25 (38.50)	12	316.50 (82.25)	9	81.90	398.40
7	Sebastián Villa	Colombia	72.00	2	115.70 (43.70)	12	196.70 (81.00)	9	259.70 (63.00)	8	326.00 (66.30)	7	71.40	397.40
8	Donato Neglia	Chile	67.50	7	141.90 (74.40)	3	208.20 (66.30)	5	279.60 (71.40)	5	333.85 (54.25)	5	58.50	392.35
9	Sebastián Morales	Colombia	69.75	3	144.55 (74.80)	2	230.30 (85.75)	1	283.50 (53.20)	4	310.50 (27.00)	12	69.70	380.20
10	Yona Knight-Wisdom	Jamaica	66.00	9	134.20 (68.20)	9	197.20 (63.00)	8	254.20 (57.00)	9	313.70 (59.50)	10	66.30	380.00
11	Zachary Nees	United States	72.85	1	137.60 (64.75)	7	182.60 (45.00)	11	248.90 (66.30)	10	311.60 (62.70)	11	56.10	367.70
12	Alfredo Colmenarez	Venezuela	60.00	11	131.30 (71.30)	11	182.30 (51.00)	12	245.30 (63.00)	11	316.70 (71.40)	8	42.50	359.20
