= Scarlett Mew Jensen =

British diver (born 2001)

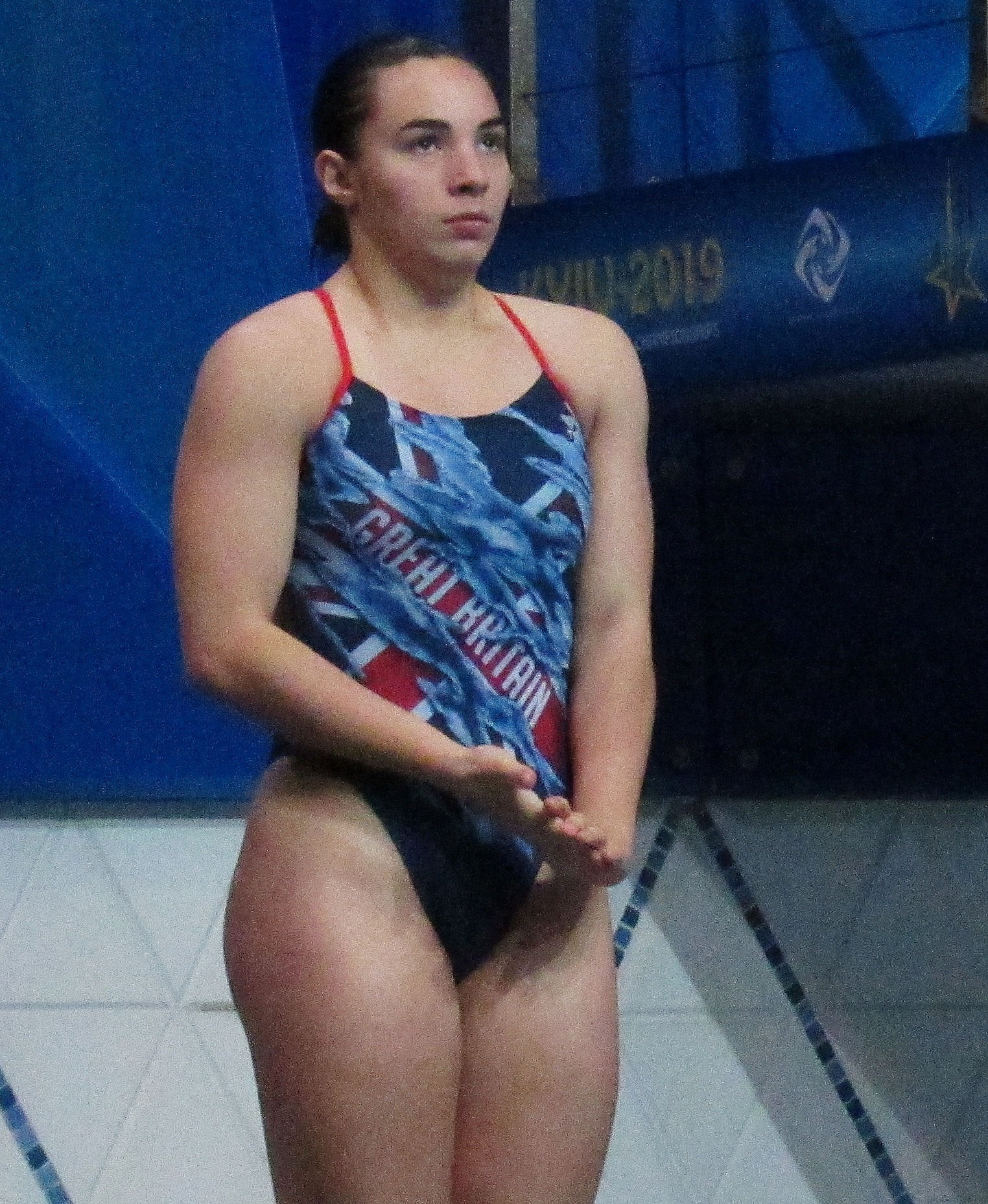
- Mew Jensen at the 2019 European Diving Championships in Kyiv

Personal information
- Nationality: British
- Born: 31 December 2001 (age 24) Hackney, England

Sport
- Country: Great Britain
- Sport: Diving
- Club: Dive London Aquatics
Medal record
Women's diving
Representing Great Britain
Olympic Games
Bronze medal – third place	2024 Paris	3 m synchro
World Championships
Gold medal – first place	2024 Doha	Team event
Silver medal – second place	2023 Fukuoka	3 m synchro
Silver medal – second place	2025 Singapore	3 m synchro
Bronze medal – third place	2024 Doha	3 m synchro

Scarlett Mew Jensen (born 31 December 2001) is a British diver. She formed part of the gold medal winning Great Britain squad in the Team event at the 2024 World Aquatics championships, and has won two World Championship medals in her specialist 3 metre synchronised springboard event with Yasmin Harper. She won a bronze medal in the 3m synchro springboard event at the 2024 Summer Olympics.

== Career ==
Mew Jensen competed in the women's 1 metre springboard event at the 2019 World Aquatics Championships. She finished in 19th place in the preliminary round. In the women's 3 metre springboard event she finished in 26th place in the preliminary round.

In May 2023, she won her fourth 3m synchro title at the British Diving Championships, it was the second time she medalled with Yasmin Harper.

In July, 2023 she won a silver medal at the 2023 World Aquatics Championships, diving with Harper again, in the 3m synchro springboard event. This sealed qualification for the Paris 2024 Summer Olympics where the duo won a bronze medal.

In 2025, at the World Championships in Singapore, she won a silver medal with Yasmin Harper, in the 3 metre synchro springboard.
