= Juan Celaya (diver) =

Mexican diver (born 1998)

Juan Celaya OLY
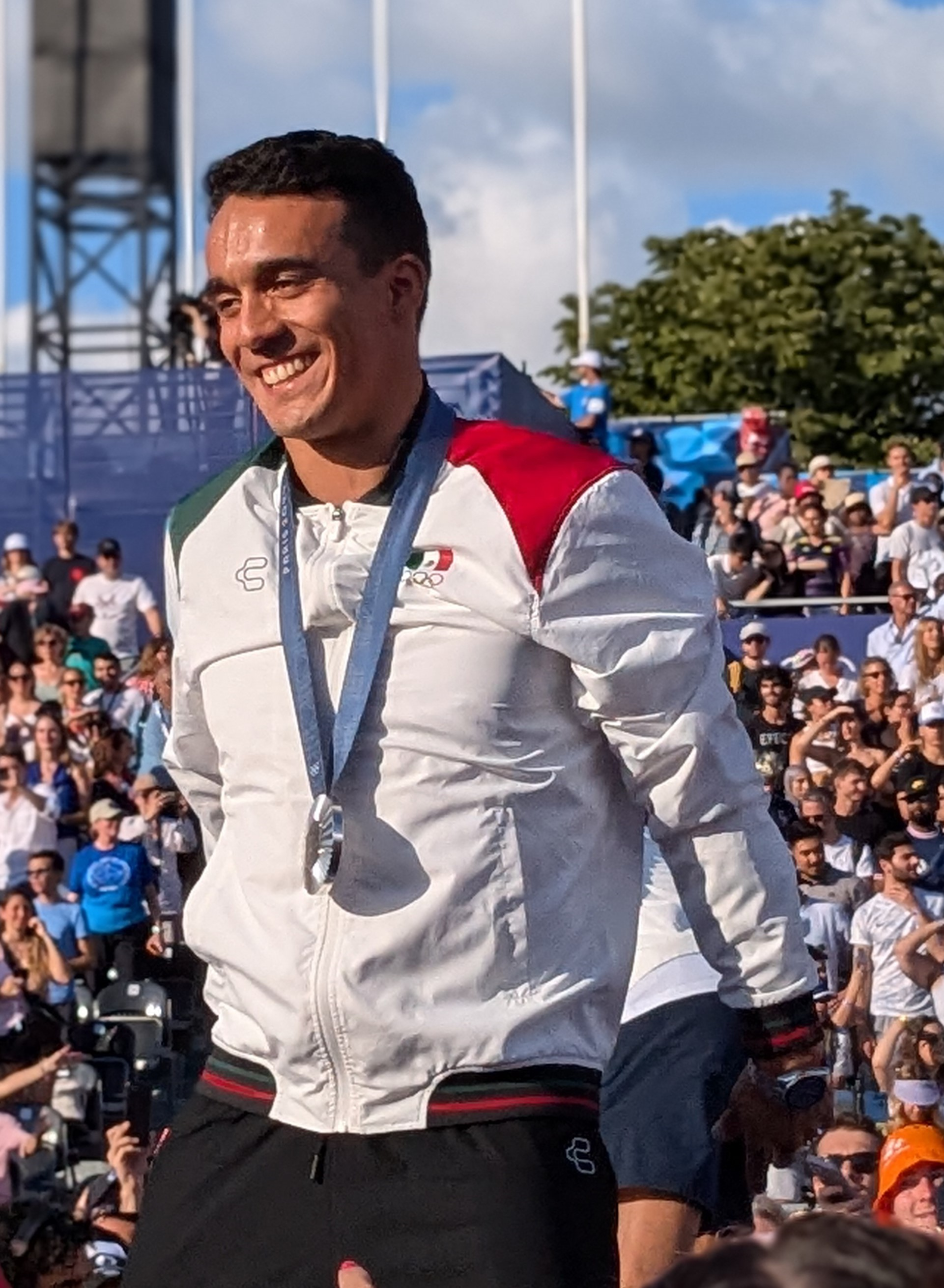
- Celaya during the 2024 Summer Olympics

Personal information
- Full name: Juan Manuel Celaya Hernández
- Born: 1 September 1998 (age 28) San Nicolás de los Garza, Mexico
- Height: 5 ft 6 in (168 cm)

Sport
- Country: Mexico
- Sport: Diving
- Event: 3 m synchro
Medal record
Men's diving
Representing Mexico
Olympic Games
Silver medal – second place	2024 Paris	3 m synchro
World Championships
Silver medal – second place	2025 Singapore	3 m synchro
Bronze medal – third place	2019 Gwangju	3 m synchro
Pan American Games
Gold medal – first place	2019 Lima	1 m springboard
Gold medal – first place	2019 Lima	3 m synchro
Silver medal – second place	2019 Lima	3 m springboard

Juan Manuel Celaya Hernández OLY (born 1 September 1998) is a Mexican diver. He participated at the 2019 World Aquatics Championships, winning a medal. He also competed in the men's synchronized 3 meter diving event at the 2021 Olympic Games held in Tokyo, where he placed fourth alongside partner Yahel Castillo.

At the 2024 Paris Olympics, he won the silver medal in synchronized diving.
