= Diving at the 2018 Commonwealth Games – Men's synchronised 3 metre springboard =

Men's synchronised 3 metre springboard at the 2018 Commonwealth Games
- Venue: Gold Coast Aquatic Centre
- Date: 13 April
- Competitors: 16 from 5 nations
- Winning sore: 436.17

Medalists
gold medal	Jack Laugher; Chris Mears	England
silver medal	Philippe Gagné; François Imbeau-Dulac	Canada
bronze medal	Domonic Bedggood; Matthew Carter	Australia

The men's synchronised 3 metre springboard was part of the Diving at the 2018 Commonwealth Games program. The competition was held on 13 April 2018 at Gold Coast Aquatic Centre in the Gold Coast.

== Schedule ==
All times are AEST (UTC+10)

Date	Time	Round
13 April 2018	21:09	Finals

== Format ==
A single round was held, with each team making six dives. Eleven judges scored each dive: three for each diver, and five for synchronisation. Only the middle score counted for each diver, with the middle three counting for synchronisation. These five scores were averaged, multiplied by 3, and multiplied by the dive's degree of difficulty to give a total dive score. The scores for each of the five dives were summed to give a final score.

== Results ==
Results:

Rank	Nation	Dives						Total
Rank	Nation	1	2	3	4	5	6	Total
1st place, gold medalist(s)	England; Jack Laugher; Chris Mears	50.40	51.00	81.60	77.52	92.43	83.22	436.17
2nd place, silver medalist(s)	Canada; Philippe Gagné; François Imbeau-Dulac	49.20	50.40	74.40	81.90	78.75	80.58	415.23
3rd place, bronze medalist(s)	Australia; Domonic Bedggood; Matthew Carter	53.40	49.80	71.10	74.46	81.84	77.52	408.12
4	Malaysia; Chew Yiwei; Ooi Tze Liang	52.20	49.80	79.05	62.37	75.48	76.50	395.40
5	England; Jack Haslam; Ross Haslam	52.20	51.00	77.40	72.90	69.36	72.45	395.31
6	Australia; James Connor; Kurtis Mathews	47.40	49.80	76.26	66.30	66.15	64.26	370.17
7	Malaysia; Gabriel Gilbert Daim; Muhammad Syafiq Puteh	48.60	45.00	69.30	68.82	68.40	69.30	369.42
8	New Zealand; Anton Down-Jenkins; Liam Stone	47.40	48.00	57.60	51.30	70.20	58.14	332.64
