= Diving at the 2018 European Aquatics Championships – Mixed 3 m springboard synchro =

Aquatics sports competition

Mixed 3 m springboard synchro at the 2018 European Aquatics Championships
- Venue: Royal Commonwealth Pool
- Dates: 8 August
- Competitors: 20 from 10 nations
- Teams: 10
- Winning points: 313.50

Medalists
gold medal	Lou Massenberg; Tina Punzel	Germany
silver medal	Ross Haslam; Grace Reid	Great Britain
bronze medal	Viktoriya Kesar; Stanislav Oliferchyk	Ukraine

The Mixed 3 m springboard synchro competition of the 2018 European Aquatics Championships was held on 8 August 2018.

== Results ==
The final was started at 13:30.

Rank	Nation	Divers	
Rank	Nation	Divers	Points
1st place, gold medalist(s)	Germany	Lou Massenberg; Tina Punzel	313.50
2nd place, silver medalist(s)	Great Britain	Ross Haslam; Grace Reid	308.67
3rd place, bronze medalist(s)	Ukraine	Viktoriya Kesar; Stanislav Oliferchyk	291.81
4	Netherlands	Pascal Faatz; Inge Jansen	278.10
5	Switzerland	Michelle Heimberg; Jonathan Suckow	274.50
6	Russia	Nadezhda Bazhina; Nikita Shleikher	272.40
7	Italy	Elena Bertocchi; Maicol Verzotto	268.05
8	Poland	Kacper Lesiak; Kaja Skrzek	265.02
9	Sweden	Daniella Nero; Vinko Paradzik	233.34
10	Austria	Nikolaj Schaller; Selina Staudenherz	207.84
