= British Diving Championships =

British Diving event

- Frequency: annual
- Organiser: Aquatics GB

The British Diving Championships are an annual event organised by Aquatics GB (previously known as British Swimming), the governing body of swimming and aquatics in Great Britain.

== History ==
Historically the Championships was held as part of the British Swimming Championships but they became a stand-alone Championships in 1963.

Previously the Amateur Swimming Association (ASA) National Championships fulfilled a similar role in recognising national champions.

== Disciplines ==
The championships are for pool diving only, with the events of the Olympic program supplemented by the 1 metre springboard events.

- 1 metre springboard - British Diving Championships - 1 metre springboard diving winners
- 3 metre springboard - British Diving Championships - 3 metre springboard diving winners
- 10 metre platform - British Diving Championships - 10 metre platform diving winners
- synchronised 3 metre springboard - British Diving Championships - synchronised 3 metre springboard diving winners
- synchronised 10 metre platform - British Diving Championships - synchronised 10 metre platform diving winners
- plain (discontinued) - British Diving Championships - plain diving winners

== Venues and dates (since 2004) ==
Year	Dates	Venue
2004	13–14 December 2003	Ponds Forge, Sheffield
2005	11–13 February 2005	Ponds Forge, Sheffield
2006	16–18 December 2005	Manchester Aquatics Centre
2007	15–17 December 2006	Manchester Aquatics Centre
2008	4–6 January 2008	Manchester Aquatics Centre
2009	5–7 February 2009	Ponds Forge, Sheffield
2010	25–27 June 2010	Ponds Forge, Sheffield
2011	10–12 June 2-11	John Charles Aquatics Centre, Leeds
2012	8–10 June 2012	Ponds Forge, Sheffield
2013	8–10 February 2013	Plymouth Life Centre
2014	6–8 June 2014	Ponds Forge, Sheffield
2015	20–22 February 2015	Plymouth Life Centre
2016	10–12 June 2016	Ponds Forge, Sheffield
2017	1–4 June 2017	Royal Commonwealth Pool, Edinburgh
2018	26-28 January 2018	Plymouth Life Centre
2019	31 May-2 June 2019	Royal Commonwealth Pool, Edinburgh
2020	24-26 January 2020	Plymouth Life Centre
2021	cancelled due to the COVID-19 pandemic.	
2022	27-29 May 2022	Ponds Forge, Sheffield
2023	25-28 May 2023	Ponds Forge, Sheffield
2024	23-26 May 2024	Sandwell Aquatics Centre, West Midlands
2025	5-8 June 2025	Sandwell Aquatics Centre, West Midlands

== See also ==
- List of British Swimming Championships champions
