= Diving at the 2015 Pan American Games – Men's synchronized 3 metre springboard =

Men's synchronized 3 metre springboard at the 2015 Pan American Games
- Venue: CIBC Pan Am/Parapan Am Aquatics Centre and Field House
- Dates: July 13
- Competitors: 16 from 8 nations
- Winning score: 438.27

Medalists
Gold medal	Jahir Ocampo; Rommel Pacheco	Mexico
Silver medal	Philippe Gagné; François Imbeau-Dulac	Canada
Bronze medal	Cory Bowersox; Zachary Nees	United States

The men's synchronized 3 metre springboard competition of the diving events at the 2015 Pan American Games will be held on July 13 at the CIBC Pan Am/Parapan Am Aquatics Centre and Field House in Toronto, Canada. The winner of the competition will qualify his country a quota place for the 2016 Summer Olympics in Rio de Janeiro, Brazil. If the host nation of the Olympics wins the event, the runner up will qualify instead.

The synchronized diving competitions all consist of one round. All teams compete in a single round of six dives.

Seven judges evaluate each dive, giving the diver a score between 0 and 10 with increments of 0.5; scores below 7.0 or above 9.5 are rare. The two highest and two lowest scores from each judge are dropped. The remaining three scores are summed, and multiplied by the degree of difficulty of the dive to give the total score for the dive. Scores from each dive in the round are summed to give the round score.

== Schedule ==
Date	Time	Round
July 13, 2015	14:25	Finals

== Results ==
Rank	Divers	Nationality	Points
1st place, gold medalist(s)	Jahir Ocampo; Rommel Pacheco	Mexico	438.27
2nd place, silver medalist(s)	Philippe Gagné; François Imbeau-Dulac	Canada	413.37
3rd place, bronze medalist(s)	Cory Bowersox; Zachary Nees	United States	385.38
4	César Castro; Ian Matos	Brazil	374.61
5	Sebastián Morales; Sebastián Villa	Colombia	371.64
6	Edickson Contreras; Robert Páez	Venezuela	343.05
7	Diego Carquin; Donato Neglia	Chile	324.09
8	Adrian Infante; Daniel Pinto	Peru	283.47
