= Diving at the 2019 Pan American Games – Men's synchronized 3 metre springboard =

Men's synchronized 3 metre springboard at the 2019 Pan American Games
- Venue: Aquatics Centre
- Dates: August 3
- Competitors: 18 from 9 nations
- Winning score: 429.81

Medalists
Gold medal	Yahel Castillo; Juan Celaya	Mexico
Silver medal	Philippe Gagné; François Imbeau-Dulac	Canada
Bronze medal	Michael Hixon; Andrew Capobianco	United States

The men's synchronized 3 metre springboard competition of the diving events at the 2019 Pan American Games was held on 3 August at the Aquatics Centre in Lima, Peru.

== Schedule ==
Date	Time	Round
August 3, 2019	20:37	Final

== Results ==
Rank	Diver	Nationality	Points
1st place, gold medalist(s)	Yahel Castillo; Juan Celaya	Mexico	429.81
2nd place, silver medalist(s)	Philippe Gagné; François Imbeau-Dulac	Canada	414.21
3rd place, bronze medalist(s)	Michael Hixon; Andrew Capobianco	United States	404.13
4	Sebastián Morales; Daniel Restrepo	Colombia	389.31
5	Laydel Domínguez; José Quintana	Cuba	367.08
6	José Ruvalcaba; Frandiel Gómez	Dominican Republic	359.82
7	Diego Carquin; Donato Neglia	Chile	341.64
8	Luis Bonfim; Kawan Pereira	Brazil	335.49
9	Adrian Infante; Daniel Pinto	Peru	331.29
