= Diving at the 2008 Summer Olympics – Women's synchronized 3 metre springboard =

Women's synchronized 3 metre springboard at the Games of the XXIX Olympiad
- Venue: Beijing National Aquatics Center
- Date: 10 August 2008
- Competitors: 16 from 8 nations

Medalists
1st place, gold medalist(s)		Guo Jingjing; Wu Minxia	China
2nd place, silver medalist(s)		Julia Pakhalina; Anastasia Pozdnyakova	Russia
3rd place, bronze medalist(s)		Ditte Kotzian; Heike Fischer	Germany

Women's synchronized 3 metre springboard competition at the Beijing 2008 Summer Olympics was held on 10 August at the Beijing National Aquatics Center.

As in all other synchronized diving competitions at the Olympics, a single round of competition was held. Eight pairs of divers competed. Each pair performed five dives, with both divers from the pair jumping at the same time.

Nine judges evaluated each dive, with two each judging the performance of the two divers (the execution judges) and five judges evaluating the synchronization of the pair (the synchronization judges). For each dive, four of the nine scores are ignored—the highest and lowest execution scores, and the highest and lowest synchronization scores. The remaining five scores are summed, multiplied by the dive's degree of difficulty, and then multiplied by 0.6 to get the final score for the dive.

== Results ==
Rank	Nation	Dives					Total
Rank	Nation	1	2	3	4	5	Total
1st place, gold medalist(s)	China; Guo Jingjing; Wu Minxia	52.80	57.60	75.60	81.90	75.60	343.50
2nd place, silver medalist(s)	Russia; Julia Pakhalina; Anastasia Pozdnyakova	52.80	51.00	69.30	77.43	73.08	323.61
3rd place, bronze medalist(s)	Germany; Ditte Kotzian; Heike Fischer	51.00	51.60	68.40	70.20	76.50	318.90
4	United States; Kelci Bryant; Ariel Rittenhouse	52.80	51.00	69.30	69.30	72.00	314.40
5	Australia; Briony Cole; Sharleen Stratton	52.20	51.60	68.40	67.14	72.00	311.34
6	Italy; Noemi Batki; Francesca Dallapè	48.00	51.60	68.40	70.20	58.50	296.70
7	Ukraine; Mariya Voloshchenko; Anna Pysmenska	49.80	48.00	63.80	65.70	65.70	293.10
8	Great Britain; Tandi Gerrard; Hayley Sage	46.80	48.60	53.70	65.29	63.84	278.25
