= Ross Haslam =

British diver (born 1997)

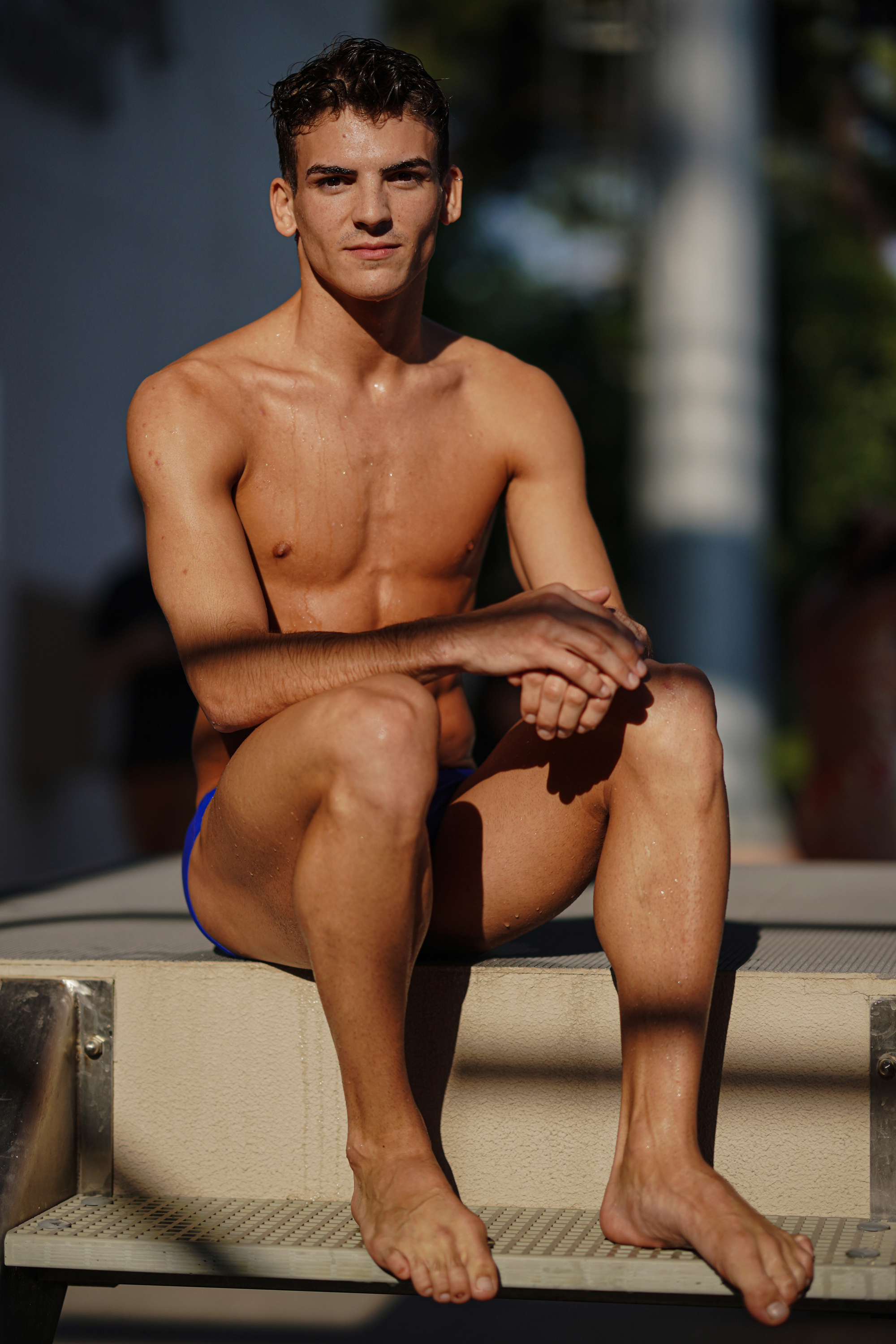

Personal information
- Full name: Ross Steven Haslam
- Born: 2 October 1997 (age 28) Sheffield, England
- Height: 175 cm (5 ft 9 in)
- Weight: 75 kg (165 lb)

Sport
- Country: Great Britain
- Sport: Diving
- Events: Springboard, synchro
- Club: Sheffield Diving
- Coached by: Tom Owens
Medal record
Representing Great Britain
World Championships
Bronze medal – third place	2024 Doha	1 m springboard
European Games
Gold medal – first place	2023 Kraków-Małopolska	1 m springboard
Silver medal – second place	2015 Baku	3 m synchro
European Championships
Silver medal – second place	2018 Glasgow	3 m mixed synchro
European Diving Championships
Gold medal – first place	2023 Rzeszów	1 m springboard
FINA Diving World Cup
Bronze medal – third place	2018 Wuhan	3 m mixed synchro

Ross Haslam (born 2 October 1997) is a professional competitive British diver, representing Great Britain at numerous international events. He is the 2023 European Games gold medalist and 2023 European Diving champion on the 1 metre springboard, and silver medalist in the mixed synchronised 3 metre springboard at the same event. In 2024, he won the bronze medal in the 1 metre springboard at the 2024 World Aquatics Championships in Doha, Qatar.

== Background ==
Haslam was born in Sheffield on 2 October 1997. He first started diving when he was 6. He has a brother Jack who is also a diver.

== Career ==
Haslam first won an individual senior national medal with a bronze in the 10 metre platform at the 2012 British National Cup. The same year he started representing Great Britain in the European Junior Championships.

In 2015, at the inaugural European Games held in Baku where the diving events are for juniors only, he won a silver in the men's synchronised 3 metre springboard with James Heatly.

In 2018, at the FINA World Cup in Wuhan, China, he won a bronze in the mixed synchronised 3 metre springboard with Grace Reid.

At the 2018 European Championships in Glasgow/Edinburgh, Haslam partnered with Grace Reid for the second time as her partner in this event Tom Daley had taken paternity leave for the rest of year. They won a silver in the mixed synchronised 3 metre springboard.

In May 2023, he won the 1m springboard title and 3m synchro title, at the British Diving Championships. One month later, during the 2023 European Diving Championships which were held as part of the 2023 European Games in Rzeszów, Poland he won a gold medal on the 1 metre springboard. He also performed in the 3 metre springboard event where he finished fourth. On the synchronised 3 metre springboard he partnered again with James Heatly where they became fourth, finishing less than two points behind the bronze medalists.
