= Diving at the 2008 Summer Olympics – Men's synchronized 3 metre springboard =

Men's synchronized 3 metre springboard at the Games of the XXIX Olympiad
- Venue: Beijing National Aquatics Center
- Date: 13 August

Medalists
1st place, gold medalist(s)		Wang Feng; Qin Kai	China
2nd place, silver medalist(s)		Dmitri Sautin; Yuriy Kunakov	Russia
3rd place, bronze medalist(s)		Illya Kvasha; Oleksiy Prygorov	Ukraine

Men's synchronized 3 metre springboard competition at the Beijing 2008 Summer Olympics took place on August 13 at the Beijing National Aquatics Center.

Like all other synchronized diving competitions at the Olympics, only one round of competition was held. Eight pairs of divers competed. Each pair performed five dives, with both divers from the pair diving at the same time.

Nine judges evaluated each dive, with two each judging the performance of the two divers (the execution judges) and five judges evaluating the synchronization of the pair (the synchronization judges). For each dive, four of the nine scores are ignored—the highest and lowest execution scores, and the highest and lowest synchronization scores. The remaining five scores are summed, multiplied by the dive's degree of difficulty, and then multiplied by 0.6 to get a final score for the dive.

== Results ==
Rank	Nation	Dives						Total
Rank	Nation	1	2	3	4	5	6	Total
1st place, gold medalist(s)	China; Wang Feng; Qin Kai	57.60	55.80	83.70	89.76	87.72	94.50	469.08
2nd place, silver medalist(s)	Russia; Dmitri Sautin; Yuriy Kunakov	54.60	52.20	80.10	79.56	67.32	88.20	421.98
3rd place, bronze medalist(s)	Ukraine; Illya Kvasha; Oleksiy Pryhorov	51.00	43.20	79.56	78.54	84.00	78.75	415.05
4	United States; Chris Colwill; Jevon Tarantino	51.00	50.40	76.26	72.42	85.05	75.60	410.73
5	Canada; Alexandre Despatie; Arturo Miranda	53.40	49.80	77.40	71.61	77.52	79.56	409.29
6	Germany; Pavlo Rozenberg; Sascha Klein	50.40	52.20	73.44	76.65	76.65	73.50	402.84
7	Great Britain; Nick Robinson-Baker; Ben Swain	51.00	49.20	76.26	67.50	81.90	76.50	402.36
8	Australia; Scott Robertson; Robert Newbery	50.40	51.60	56.73	82.62	77.70	74.55	393.80
