= Svetlana Filippova =

Russian diver (born 1990)

Personal information
- Full name: Svetlana Vyacheslavovna; Filippova
- Nationality: Russia
- Born: 8 July 1990 (age 35) Moscow, Russian SFSR, Soviet Union
- Height: 1.65 m (5 ft 5 in)
- Weight: 47 kg (104 lb)

Sport
- Sport: Diving
- Event(s): 3 m, 3 m synchro
- Partner(s): Nadezda Bazhina; Anastasia Pozdniakova

Svetlana Vyacheslavovna Filippova (Russian: Светлана Вячеславовна Филиппова; born July 8, 1990, in Moscow) is a Russian springboard diver. Filippova has won a total of three medals, along with her partners Nadezda Bazhina: (silver in Moscow, and bronze in Beijing), and Anastasia Pozdniakova (bronze in Guanajuato, Mexico), for the women's synchronized springboard at the 2011 FINA Diving World Series.

Filippova represented Russia at the 2008 Summer Olympics, where she competed for the women's springboard event, along with her teammate Yuliya Pakhalina (who eventually won the silver medal in the final). She placed nineteenth out of thirty divers in the preliminary round by two points behind Hungary's Nóra Barta, with a total score of 274.20 after six successive attempts.
