= Ditte Kotzian =

German diver (born 1979)

Personal information
- Born: 9 March 1979 (age 47) East Berlin, East Germany
Medal record
Women's diving
Representing Germany
Olympic Games
Bronze medal – third place	2008 Beijing	3 m synchro
World Championships
Silver medal – second place	2007 Melbourne	3 m synchro
European Championships
Gold medal – first place	2002 Berlin	3 m synchro
Gold medal – first place	2002 Berlin	10 m synchro
Silver medal – second place	2002 Berlin	3 m springboard
Silver medal – second place	2004 Madrid	3 m synchro
Silver medal – second place	2006 Budapest	1 m springboard
Silver medal – second place	2006 Budapest	3 m springboard
Silver medal – second place	2006 Budapest	3 m synchro
Silver medal – second place	2008 Eindhoven	3 m synchro
Summer Universiade
Silver medal – second place	2001 Beijing	3 m synchro
Silver medal – second place	2003 Daegu	3 m synchro
Bronze medal – third place	2003 Daegu	3 m springboard

Ditte Kotzian (born 9 March 1979, in East Berlin) is a German diver. She and Heike Fischer won bronze for Diving at the 2008 Summer Olympics – Women's synchronized 3 metre springboard. She had competed in the two previous Olympics without placing. She and Fischer had previously won a silver medal for Diving at the 2007 World Aquatics Championships.
