= Heike Fischer =

German diver (born 1982)

Personal information
- Born: 7 September 1982 (age 43)
Medal record
Women's diving
Representing Germany
Olympic Games
Bronze medal – third place	2008 Beijing	3 m synchro
World Championships
Silver medal – second place	2007 Melbourne	3 m synchro
Bronze medal – third place	2005 Montreal	1 m springboard
European Championships
Gold medal – first place	2002 Berlin	1 m springboard
Gold medal – first place	2004 Madrid	1 m springboard
Silver medal – second place	2000 Helsinki	1 m springboard
Silver medal – second place	2006 Budapest	3 m synchro
Silver medal – second place	2008 Eindhoven	3 m synchro

Heike Fischer (born 7 September 1982 in Demmin) is a German diver. She and Ditte Kotzian won bronze for Diving at the 2008 Summer Olympics – Women's synchronized 3 metre springboard. She and Kotzian had previously won a silver medal for diving at the 2007 World Aquatics Championships.

Fischer competed in the Diving at the 2004 Summer Olympics – Women's 3 metre springboard.

She lives in Leipzig, and is a sports soldier in the Bundeswehr. She is studying business studies at the AKAD-Fachhochschule Leipzig.

Her trainer is Margit Fischer.
