= Philippe Gagné =

Canadian diver (born 1997)

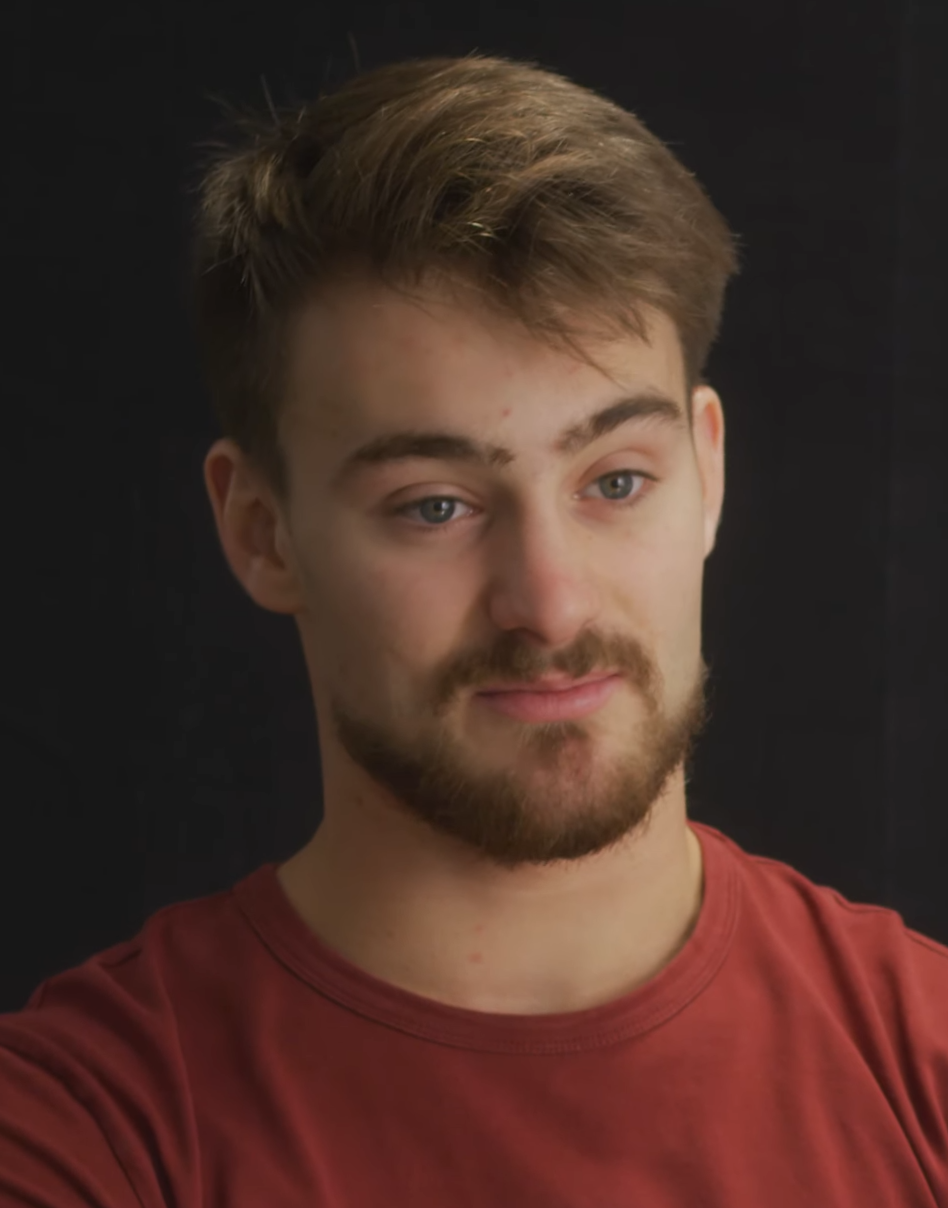
- Gagné in 2020

Personal information
- Born: October 23, 1997 (age 28) Montreal, Quebec, Canada
- Home town: Montreal, Quebec
- Height: 180 cm (5 ft 11 in)

Sport
- Country: Canada
- Club: CAMO
Medal record
Men's diving
Representing Canada
Youth Olympic Games
Silver medal – second place	2014 Nanjing	10 m platform
Bronze medal – third place	2014 Nanjing	3 m springboard
Pan American Games
Silver medal – second place	2015 Toronto	10 m synchro
Silver medal – second place	2015 Toronto	3 m synchro
Silver medal – second place	2019 Lima	3 m synchro
Bronze medal – third place	2015 Toronto	3 m springboard
Bronze medal – third place	2019 Lima	3 m springboard
Commonwealth Games
Silver medal – second place	2018 Gold Coast	3 m springboard
Silver medal – second place	2018 Gold Coast	3 m synchro

Philippe Gagné (born October 23, 1997) is a Canadian elite diver. He won a silver medal at the 10 m platform and a bronze medal at the 3 m springboard at the 2014 Summer Youth Olympics. He competed at several World Cups and Grand Prix events.

Gagne was born in Montreal, Quebec.

He was selected as a member of the Canadian Olympic team for the 2016 games in Rio. He progressed through the preliminary and semi-final rounds, finishing 11th in the final with a score of 425.30 in the 3m springboard event.

== Achievements ==
- 2014 – 2014 Summer Youth Olympics – Silver on 10M and Bronze on 3M.
- 2013 – Pan American Junior Championship – Silver on 1M & 3M synchro (with V. Riendeau), Bronze on 10M, 4th on 3M
- 2013 – Canada Summer Games – Gold on 3M & 10M, Bronze on 3M synchro (Leathead)
- 2013 – Speedo Junior Elite National Championships – Gold on 1M, 3M & 3M synchro (Leathead), Silver on 10M
- 2013 – Summer Senior National Championships – Gold on 10M & 10M synchro (Bouchard)
- 2013 – Puerto Rico Grand Prix – Bronze on 10M & Silver on 10M synchro (with Bouchard)
- 2013 – Gillette Canada Cup – 11th on 10M & 6th on 10M synchro (Bouchard)
- 2013 – Winter Senior National Championships – Silver on 10M & Gold on 10M synchro (Bouchard)
- 2012 – Speedo Junior National Championships – Gold on 1M, 3M & 10M
- 2011 – Speedo Junior National Championships – Bronze on 1M
- 2011 – Summer Senior National Championships – Silver on 10M synchro (Papineau)
- 2010 – Speedo Junior National Championships – Gold on 1M, 3M & 10M
- 2009 – Speedo Junior National Championships – Gold on 10M, Silver on 1M
- 2008 – Speedo Junior National Championships – Gold on 1M & 10M, Silver on 3M
