= Wang Hao (diver) =

Chinese diver

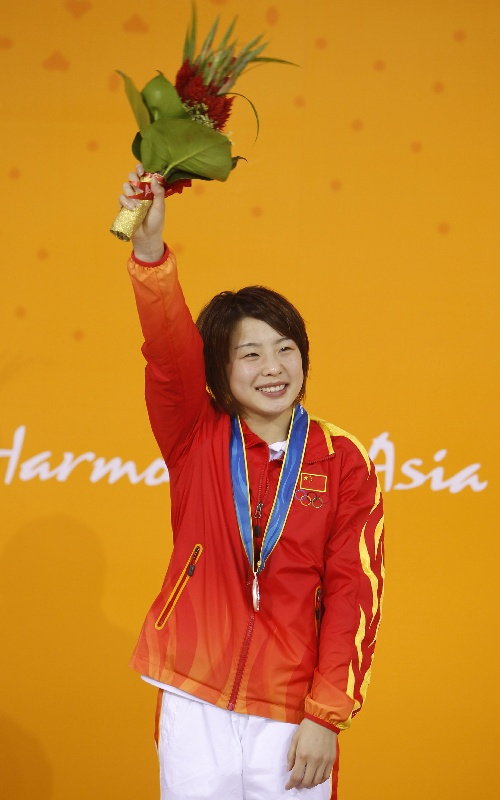

Personal information
- Nationality: China
- Born: December 26, 1992 (age 33) Tianjin
- Height: 1.55 m (5 ft 1 in)

Sport
- Sport: Diving
- Event(s): 10 m, 10 m synchro
Medal record
Event	1st	2nd	3rd
Olympic Games	1	-	-
World Championships	1	-	-
FINA Diving World Cup	3	-	-
Asian Games	1	1	-
Olympic Games
Gold medal – first place	2012	10 m synchro
World Championships
Gold medal – first place	2011	10 m synchro
Asian Games
Gold medal – first place	2010	10 m synchro
Silver medal – second place	2010	10 m

Wang Hao (Chinese: 汪皓; pinyin: Wāng Hào; born December 26, 1992, in Tianjin) is a Chinese diver. She won the gold medal in women's 10m synchronized platform with Chen Ruolin at the 2011 World Aquatics Championships in Shanghai.

== Major achievements ==
- 2006 National Diving Championships - (gold) 1st 10m Platform
- 2007 National Diving Championships - (gold) 1st 10m Platform
- 2008 FINA Diving Grand Prix (Madrid) - (gold) 1st 10m Platform & 10m Synchronized Platform
- 2009 National Games – (gold) 1st 10m Synchronized Platform
- 2009 East Asian Games – (gold) 1st 10m Platform & 10m Synchronized Platform
- 2010 FINA Diving World Series (Mexico Leg) - (gold) 1st 10m Synchronized Platform
- 2010 Asian Games – (gold) 1st 10m Synchronized Platform; (silver) 2nd 10m Platform
- 2011 FINA Diving World Series (Moscow Leg) - (gold) 1st 10m Synchronized Platform
- 2011 FINA Diving World Series (Beijing Leg) - (gold) 1st 10m Synchronized Platform
- 2011 FINA Diving World Series (Sheffield Leg) - (gold) 1st 10m Synchronized Platform
- 2011 FINA Diving World Series (Guanajuato Leg) - (gold) 1st 10m Synchronized Platform; (silver) 2nd 10m Platform
- 2011 World Aquatics Championships– (gold) 1st 10m Synchronized Platform
