= Yuriy Kunakov =

Russian diver

Personal information
- Full name: Yuriy Alexandrovich Kunakov
- Born: 19 February 1990 (age 36)
- Height: 5 ft 7 in (170 cm)

Sport
- Country: Russia
- Event: 3 m synchro
- Club: Water-Sports Castle
- Partner: Dmitri Sautin
- Coached by: Gennady Ivanovich Starodubtsev, Tatiana Starodubtseva
Medal record
Men's diving
Representing Russia
Olympic Games
Silver medal – second place	2008 Beijing	3 m synchro
European Championships
Gold medal – first place	2008 Eindhoven	3 m synchro
Silver medal – second place	2006 Budapest	3 m synchro
Bronze medal – third place	2010 Budapest	3 m synchro

Yuriy Aleksandrovič Kunakov (Russian: Юрий Александрович Кунаков) is a Russian diver who won the silver medal in the 3 m spring synchro along with Dmitri Sautin in the 2008 Summer Olympics in Beijing.
