= François Imbeau-Dulac =

Canadian diver (born 1990)

Personal information
- Born: 9 December 1990 (age 35) Quebec City, Quebec, Canada
- Height: 5 ft 8 in (173 cm)
- Weight: 168 lb (76 kg)

Sport
- Country: Canada
- Sport: Diving
- Event: 3 metre springboard
- Club: CAMO
Medal record
Men's diving
Representing Canada
World Championships
Silver medal – second place	2015 Kazan	3 m mixed synchro
Silver medal – second place	2019 Gwangju	3 m mixed synchro
Bronze medal – third place	2017 Budapest	3 m mixed synchro
Pan American Games
Silver medal – second place	2015 Toronto	3 m synchro
Silver medal – second place	2019 Lima	3 m synchro
Commonwealth Games
Silver medal – second place	2018 Gold Coast	3 m synchro

François Imbeau-Dulac (born 9 December 1990) is a Canadian diver.

He began diving at the age of 9, and began competing internationally in 2006.

In 2011 Imbeau-Dulac broke the Canadian record (held at the time by Alexandre Despatie) in the 1m springboard event. He competed in the 3 m springboard event at the 2012 Summer Olympics. He placed 13th, just short of making the final. He competed in the 3 m springboard and the 1 m springboard events at the 2014 Commonwealth Games. With Jennifer Abel, he won the silver medal in the 3 m mixed synchronised diving at the 2015 World Aquatics Championship. At the 2017 World Aquatics Championship, he and Abel again won a medal in the mixed synchronised diving event, this time bronze.

At the 2018 Commonwealth Games, he competed in the men's 3 m springboard event and the men's 3 m synchronised springboard event, winning the silver medal with Philippe Gagne. At the 2019 World Aquatics Championship, Imbeau-Dulac and Abel won their third World Championship synchronised diving medal in a row, winning the silver medal.

In an attempt to qualify for the 2012 Summer Olympics, around 2010, Imbeau-Dulac developed an eating disorder which involved purging. Realizing that he needed help, Imbeau-Dulac spoke to his coach after the Olympics and immediately received help from Diving Canada and a mental health professional. He has since returned to a healthy lifestyle, and would like to compete in the 2020 Summer Olympics in Tokyo, Japan.
