= Ben Swain =

British diver

Personal information
- Born: 31 March 1986 (age 40) Welwyn Garden City, Great Britain

Sport
- Sport: Diving

Benjamin William Oliver Swain (born 31 March 1986) is a British synchronized diver. During the Beijing 2008 Summer Olympics, Swain took part in the Men's 3m Springboard Synchronized event with Nicholas Robinson-Baker. Swain and Robinson-Baker were placed seventh at 2008 Summer Olympics in the synchronised 3m springboard event. He won gold in 2009 in the 3m synchro with Robinson-Baker in the World Series leg in Mexico. He suffered an injury to his anterior cruciate ligament in December 2009 and had an ACL reconstruction in February 2010, ending his season, after which Robinson-Baker partnered with Chris Mears that year. Swain returned to diving in 2011 but did not make the Olympic team in 2012.

Ben Swain retired in 2012 and became a sport and remedial massage therapist until 2015. Ben married in 2013 in Scotland and in 2015, changed career, successfully training to become an emergency medical technician, working for the NHS ambulance service until moving to Australia in November 2017.

Swain has a Diploma Sport and Exercise Science from Manchester Metropolitan University and a degree in Paramedic Science from Flinders University (Adelaide).
