= Tandi Indergaard =

South-African born English diver

Personal information
- Full name: Tandi Jane Gerrard-Indergaard
- Nationality: United Kingdom; England
- Born: 25 February 1978 (age 48) Johannesburg, South Africa
- Height: 1.58 m (5 ft 2 in)
- Weight: 58 kg (128 lb)

Sport
- Sport: Diving
- Event: Springboard
- Club: City of Leeds (GBR)
- Partner: Hayley Sage
- Coached by: Adrian Hinchliffe (GBR)
Medal record
Women's diving
Representing England
Commonwealth Games
Bronze medal – third place	2006 Melbourne	3 m spring synchro

Tandi Jane Indergaard (née Gerrard) (born 25 February 1978 in Johannesburg, South Africa) is a South-African born English diver, who specialized in individual and synchronized springboard events. Since 2001, Indergaard holds a dual citizenship with South Africa and Great Britain in order to compete internationally for diving. She is a three-time British diving champion and a bronze medalist for the synchronised springboard at the 2006 Commonwealth Games in Melbourne, Australia.

== Diving career ==
Indergaard, a native of Johannesburg, South Africa, started her sporting career as a gymnast at the very young age until she took up diving in 1992. She achieved her early success by winning the gold medal for diving as a demonstration sport at the 1995 All-Africa Games in Harare, Zimbabwe, and represented South Africa at the 1998 Commonwealth Games in Kuala Lumpur, Malaysia, where she met British-born Adrian Hinchliffe, who later served as her personal coach. In 2000, Indergaard graduated from the University of the Witwatersrand, with a degree in physical education. She was also selected for South Africa to compete at the 2000 Summer Olympics in Sydney, but the South African Olympic Committee had decided not to send her.

In April 2001, Indergaard moved from her native South Africa to England in order to pursue her further career in diving. She later became a member of the British national diving team (Team GB), and joined the City of Leeds Diving Club, under her personal and head coach Hinchliffe.

Indergaard represented her current nation Great Britain at the 2004 Summer Olympics in Athens, where she and partner Jane Smith finished outside the medals in fourth place for the synchronised springboard, with a score of 302.25. After Smith's retirement in 2005, she teamed up with partner Hayley Sage, and together captured the bronze medal at the 2006 Commonwealth Games in Melbourne, Australia. In the same year, she eventually married her close friend and Norwegian-born physiotherapist Ove Indergaard in Leeds.

At the 2008 Summer Olympics in Beijing, Indergaard and her partner Sage, however, displayed a disastrous performance in the women's 3 m synchronised springboard event, finishing only in eighth place, with a final score of 278.25.

Shortly after the Olympics, Indergaard immediately retired from her sporting career, and currently works as a physical education teacher for teenagers at the John Charles Centre for Sport, in Leeds.
