= Nicholas Robinson-Baker =

English diver (born 1987)

Personal information
- Nationality: British
- Born: Nicholas Robinson-Baker; 24 June 1987 (age 39) Peckham, London, England
- Height: 5 ft 8 in (173 cm)
- Weight: 74 kg (163 lb)

Sport
- Country: England
- Sport: Diving
- Event: Men's 3 metre springboard
Medal record
Representing England
Men's Diving
Commonwealth Games
Bronze medal – third place	2014 Glasgow	Men's synchronised 3 metre springboard

Nicholas Robinson-Baker (born 24 June 1987) is an English diver.

Robinson-Baker became interested in diving when he attended a boxing camp near Crystal Palace and used the pool there. He participated in the 2008 Summer Olympics, where he was placed 7th overall in the synchronised 3m springboard event with his diving partner Ben Swain. He has won gold, silver and bronze medals on the World Series tour, with a gold in 2009 in 3m synchro with Ben Swain at the World Series leg in Mexico. At the 2012 Summer Olympics, he partnered with Chris Mears in the synchronised 3 metre springboard event and came fifth. They have also won a number of gold medals at National Cup and National Championships as well as a silver at the World Series in Mexico. At the 2014 Commonwealth Games he won bronze in the 3m springboard synchro with Freddie Woodward.

He retired from diving in 2014. He described languages as a life passion, and speaks Russian, Albanian, and Romanian.
