= Alex Croak =

Australian diver and artistic gymnast

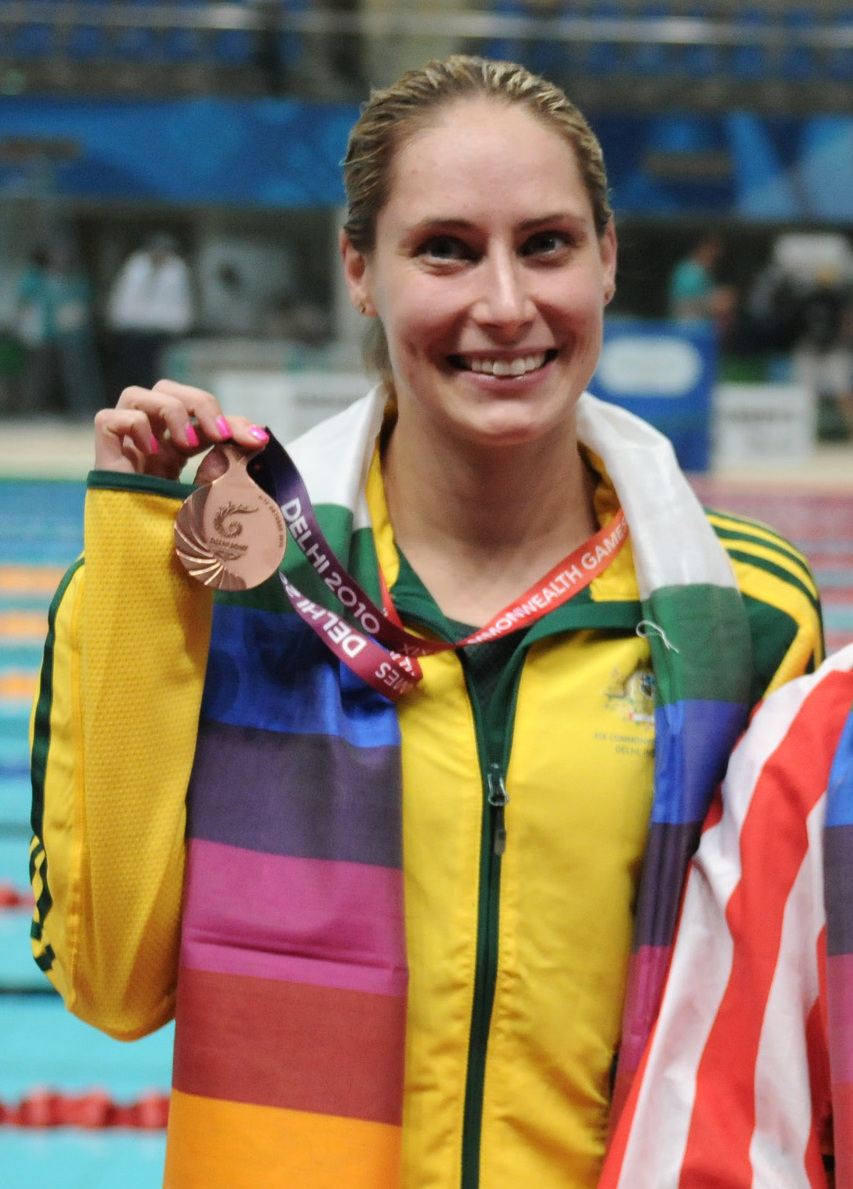
- Croak at the 2010 Commonwealth Games

Personal information
- Full name: Alexandra Lindsay Croak
- Born: 9 July 1984 (age 42) Coffs Harbour, New South Wales, Australia
- Height: 165 cm (5 ft 5 in)
- Weight: 55 kg (121 lb)

Sport
- Sport: Diving
- Club: Australian Institute of Sport; Perfect Ten Diving Club
Medal record
Representing Australia
Artistic gymnastics
Commonwealth Games
Gold medal – first place	2002 Manchester	Team
Silver medal – second place	2002 Manchester	Vault
Diving
World Championships
Silver medal – second place	2011 Shanghai	Platform
Commonwealth Games
Gold medal – first place	2010 Delhi	Platform synchro
Silver medal – second place	2006 Melbourne	Platform synchro
Bronze medal – third place	2010 Delhi	Platform

Alexandra Lindsay "Alex" Croak (born 9 July 1984) is an Australian diver and gymnast who is a dual Olympic representative. She represented Australia as a gymnast at the 2000 Summer Olympics in Sydney and after a strong performance at the 2008 Australian national Diving Championships, she was selected for Australia's diving team for the 2008 Summer Olympics in Beijing. She is the first Australian athlete to win gold medals at the Commonwealth games in two different disciplines (diving and gymnastics). She was also an Australian Institute of Sport gymnastics and diving scholarship holder.

Croak's parents were both enthusiastic sports people who encouraged their children to compete. Her sisters Emma and Rebecca were both swimmers who competed at national level. Croak on the other hand showed an aptitude for gymnastics. At the 2000 Olympics, she was part of the Australian women's team which placed 7th in the team competition. Two years later at the Manchester Commonwealth Games, she was part of the Australian team which won gold and she also won an individual silver medal in the vault.

In 2003, she switched to diving and developed quickly enough to be selected for diving team at the 2006 Commonwealth Games in Melbourne. There she won a silver medal with Melissa Wu in the 10-meter synchronized platform. Later that same year, she and Wu again won silver at the Grand Prix meeting in Rome.

Croak qualified to compete in the 10 m platform at the Beijing Olympics. She qualified into the semifinals in fourth place but had a poor first dive and did not make the final.

She finished second behind Melissa Wu in the 10 m platform at the 2009 Australian Diving Championships and was named on the team to compete in Rome in July.

Croak competed at the 2010 Commonwealth Games in Delhi, in the 10 m platform and 10 m synchronised platform. Her gold medal with Melissa Wu in the synchro event has made Croak the first Australian athlete to win Commonwealth gold medals in two different sports.
