= Hayley Sage =

British diver

Personal information
- Full name: Hayley Dawn Sage
- Nationality: United Kingdom; England
- Born: 1 August 1986 (age 39) Welwyn Garden City, Hertfordshire, England
- Height: 1.58 m (5 ft 2 in)
- Weight: 58 kg (128 lb)

Sport
- Country: Great Britain
- Sport: Diving
- Event: Springboard
- Club: Beaumont Diving Academy/City of Sheffield Diving Club
- Partner: Tandi Gerrard
- Coached by: Derek Beaumont/ Chen Wen
Medal record
Women's diving
Representing England
Commonwealth Games
Bronze medal – third place	2006 Melbourne	3 m spring synchro

Hayley Dawn Sage (born 1 August 1986 in Welwyn Garden City, Hertfordshire) is an English diver, who specialized in individual and synchronized springboard events. She won the bronze medal, along with her partner Tandi Gerrard, in the women's 3 m synchronised springboard event at the 2006 Commonwealth Games in Melbourne, Australia. Hayley represented Great Britain 32 times at international events, also achieving 10 Great Britain National titles and 26 County Championship titles representing Hertfordshire.

Sage made her official debut for the 2008 Summer Olympics in Beijing, where she competed in the women's 3 m synchronised springboard event. She and her partner Gerrard finished eighth in the final.
