= Peter Waterfield =

British diver (born 1981)

Personal information
- Full name: Peter Graham Waterfield
- Born: 12 March 1981 (age 45) Waltham Forest, London, England, United Kingdom
- Home town: Southampton, England, United Kingdom
- Height: 5 ft 6 in (168 cm)
- Weight: 64 kg (141 lb; 10 st 1 lb)

Sport
- Country: Great Britain; England
- Events: 10 m, 10 m synchro
- Club: Southampton Diving Club
- Partner: Tom Daley
Medal record
Event	1st	2nd	3rd
Olympic Games	0	1	0
World Championships	0	0	1
European Championships	0	0	2
Commonwealth Games	1	1	0
Total	1	2	3
Men's diving
Representing Great Britain
Olympic Games
Silver medal – second place	2004 Athens	10 m synchro
World Championships
Bronze medal – third place	2005 Montreal	10 m synchro
European Championships
Bronze medal – third place	1999 Istanbul	10 m synchro
Bronze medal – third place	2000 Helsinki	10 m synchro
Representing England
Commonwealth Games
Gold medal – first place	2002 Manchester	10 m platform
Silver medal – second place	2006 Melbourne	10 m platform

Peter Graham Waterfield (born 12 March 1981) is a British former diver and Olympic silver medalist.

== Diving career ==
Waterfield's specialist event during his career was the 10-metre platform event, both as solo competitor and in the synchronised event with his former partner Leon Taylor. Despite their noticeable height difference (Peter is only 5 ft 6 in or 1.68 m, Leon is almost 5 ft 11 in or 1.80 m) in a discipline normally requiring as much uniformity as possible, they turned in strong synchronised performances. Waterfield and Taylor came in fourth at the men's synchronised 10-metre platform in the 2000 Summer Olympics in Sydney. In the diving events at the 2004 Summer Olympics in Athens, they won the silver medal in the men's synchronised 10-metre platform – Britain's first Olympic diving medal since Brian Phelps in 1960.

In the 2002 Commonwealth Games held in Manchester, Waterfield's best solo showing came when he won the 10-metre gold medal. In the 2006 Commonwealth Games he won a silver medal.

For the 2011 season, Waterfield was paired in the synchronised competitions with teenager Tom Daley; Daley had finished 7th in the individual competition at the 2008 Beijing Olympics and was also a British and European champion. During the 2012 London Olympics, Waterfield and Daley achieved an agonising 4th-placed finish in the 10 m synchro diving competition after dropping their 4th dive.

Waterfield announced his retirement from diving in July 2013, at the age of 32, following a decision to cut his funding by UK Sport.

== Personal life ==
Born in London, he lives in Southampton with his wife Tania and their two sons, Lewis (born 2001) and Marshall (born 2008). Waterfield is a member of the diving club and was coached during his diving career by Lindsey Fraser. He was awarded an honorary MSc by the University of Chichester in 2005.

In January 2013, it was announced that Waterfield, who had been losing hair since his early 20s, had undergone a hair transplantation operation in order to look "more appealing to TV companies and big brands seeking sponsors."
