= Hu Yadan =

Chinese diver

Personal information
- Born: January 19, 1996 (age 30) Zigong, China

Sport
- Sport: Diving
Medal record
Representing China
Asian Games
Gold medal – first place	2010 Guangzhou	10m platform

Hu Yadan (simplified Chinese: 胡亚丹; traditional Chinese: 胡亞丹; pinyin: Hú Yàdān; 19 January 1996) is a Chinese diver. She competed in the 10 metre platform at the 2012 Summer Olympics.
