= Anastasia Pozdniakova =

Russian Olympic diver

Anastasia Pozdnyakova
Personal information
- Full name: Anastasia Yuryevna Pozdnyakova
- Born: 11 December 1985 (age 40) Elektrostal, Moscow Oblast, Russian SFSR, Soviet Union
- Height: 155 cm (5 ft 1 in)

Sport
- Country: Russia
- Event(s): 3m, 3m synchro
- College team: University of Houston
- Partner: Yulia Pakhalina
- Coached by: Jane Figueiredo
Medal record
Women's diving
Representing Russia
Olympic Games
Silver medal – second place	2008 Beijing	3 m synchro
World Championships
Bronze medal – third place	2009 Rome	3 m synchro
European Championships
Gold medal – first place	2008 Eindhoven	3 m synchro
Silver medal – second place	2010 Budapest	3 m springboard
Bronze medal – third place	2010 Budapest	1 m springboard

Anastasia Yuryevna Pozdnyakova (Russian: Анастасия Юрьевна Позднякова; born 11 December 1985) is a Russian diver. Pozdniakova competed in the 2008 Summer Olympics and won a silver medal with her partner Yuliya Pakhalina in the 3m Synchronized Springboard.

== Biography ==
She is the daughter of Tatiana and Uriy Pozdniakova. She was born in the Moscow suburb of Elektrostal, in Moscow Oblast, Russian SFSR, in the Soviet Union. She started diving when she was seven years old.

Pozdnyakova lives in Houston, Texas, United States. She competed for the University of Houston's diving team as she attended the school as an art history major in 2006-10. She was named the 2007 Conference USA 3-meter diving champion. Pozdniakova competed in the 2008 Summer Olympics and won a silver medal with her partner Yuliya Pakhalina in the 3m Synchronized Springboard. She and Pakhalina won a silver medal in the 3-meter synchronized springboard at the 2008 World Cup.

In February 2009, Pozdnyakova won her 11th-career Conference USA Diver of the Week honor, the fifth-most weekly honors won by an athlete in any C-USA sport and the most for any diver in C-USA history. In April 2009, she was named the Conference-USA Diver of the Year, after winning the 1-meter event at the 2009 NCAA Championships.

After graduating college she began coaching a junior diving club in Houston. In 2014, she began coaching the diving team at Spring Branch ISD, where she coached for the next six years. In 2021, she began coaching as the head coach at Carroll ISD in Houston.

In 2021, she was inducted into the University of Houston Athletics Hall of Honor.
