= Oleksiy Pryhorov =

Ukrainian diver (born 1987)

Personal information
- Full name: Oleksiy Pryhorov
- Born: June 25, 1987 (age 39) Kharkiv, Ukrainian SSR, Soviet Union
- Height: 183 cm (6 ft 0 in)

Sport
- Country: Ukraine
- Event(s): 3m, 3m synchro
- Partner: Illya Kvasha
Medal record
Representing Ukraine
Men's diving
Olympic Games
Bronze medal – third place	2008 Beijing	3 m spring synchro
European Championships
Gold medal – first place	2010 Budapest	3 m spring synchro
Bronze medal – third place	2012 Eindhoven	3 m spring synchro
European Diving Championships
Gold medal – first place	2009 Turin	3m synchro
Summer Universiade
Silver medal – second place	2009 Belgrade	3m synchro
Bronze medal – third place	2007 Bangkok	Team
World Cup
Bronze medal – third place	2010 Changzhou	3 m synchro

Oleksiy Pryhorov (Ukrainian: Олексій Вікторович Пригоров; born June 25, 1987, in Kharkiv) is a Ukrainian diver who won the bronze medal in the 3 m spring synchro along with Illya Kvasha in the 2008 Summer Olympics in Beijing. The duo won gold at the same event during the 2010 European Aquatics Championships. He participates at the 2019 Red Bull Cliff Diving World Series.
