= Yahel Castillo =

Mexican diver (born 1987)

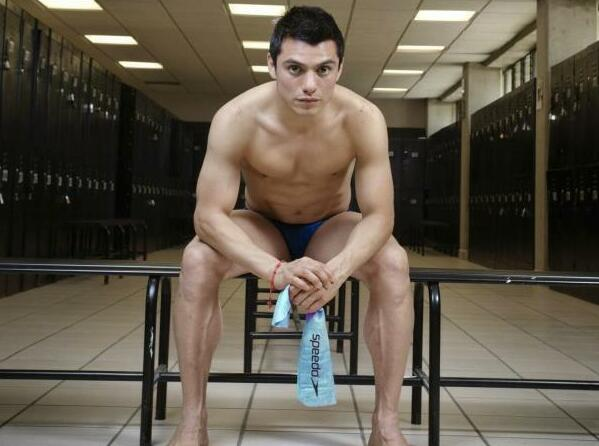

Personal information
- Full name: Yahel Ernesto Castillo Huerta
- Born: 16 June 1987 (age 39) Guadalajara, Jalisco, Mexico
- Height: 1.67 m (5 ft 6 in)
- Weight: 66 kg (146 lb)

Sport
- Country: Mexico
- Sport: Diving
- Event(s): 3 m, 3 m synchro
- Club: Mexico State
Medal record
Men's diving
Representing Mexico
World Championships
Bronze medal – third place	2011 Shanghai	3 m synchro
Bronze medal – third place	2013 Barcelona	3 m springboard
Bronze medal – third place	2019 Gwangju	3 m synchro
Summer Universiade
Silver medal – second place	2009 Belgrade	3m springboard
Bronze medal – third place	2013 Kazan	Team
Bronze medal – third place	2013 Kazan	10 m synchro
Pan American Games
Gold medal – first place	2011 Guadalajara	3 m springboard
Gold medal – first place	2011 Guadalajara	3 m synchro
Gold medal – first place	2019 Lima	3 m synchro

Yahel Ernesto Castillo Huerta (born June 6, 1987) is a Mexican diver.
