= Jane Figueiredo =

Zimbabwean diving coach

Jane Ann Figueiredo MBE (born 18 December 1963) is a Zimbabwean-British diving coach. She is best known for coaching 2020 Tokyo Olympics men's 10 m synchro champions Tom Daley and Matty Lee, and the 2000 Sydney Olympics women's 3 m springboard champions Vera Ilyina and Yulia Pakhalina. She was head diving coach at the University of Houston from 1990 to 2014, during which time she was awarded the NCAA Diving Coach of the Year four times, and members of her team won a total of 51 CSCAA All-America honours and eight NCAA championships. She was assistant coach to the British Olympic team in 1996, assistant coach for the Russian Olympic team between 2000 and 2008, and was head diving coach for the British Olympic team from 2014 to 2025.

== Early life and competitive diving career ==
Figueiredo was born in Salisbury, the capital of Rhodesia – now known as Harare, Zimbabwe – in December 1963, to a Portuguese father and British mother. Hers was a very sporting family, and her father was a motor racing driver on the local southern African circuit in the 1960s and '70s. As a child she was a competitive swimmer, but she found this "boring" so she decided to switch to diving. Following in the footsteps of a number of other Rhodesian divers, she moved to the University of Houston (UH) in the early 1980s to join their established diving program.

Figueiredo represented Zimbabwe at the 1982 World Aquatics Championships in Ecuador, where she finished in 21st position in the women's 3 m springboard competition. However, for the 1984 Los Angeles Olympics she decided to switch allegiance to Portugal – she had Portuguese citizenship through her father – as she had lost touch with the Zimbabwean aquatic federation. Figueiredo competed in the 3 m springboard competition, but was eliminated after the preliminary round and finished in 22nd position. She went on to represent Portugal again in the 1986 World Aquatics Championships in Spain, where she again competed in the women's 3 m springboard, finishing 23rd.

== Coaching career ==
Figueiredo graduated from UH in 1987, with a BA in Hotel and Restaurant Management. However, she was quickly called back to her alma mater in 1988, as assistant diving coach, which she initially combined with her new professional career. At that time she was starting work at 6:30 am, heading to the pool at 3 pm, and not finishing coaching until 9 pm. In 1990, she was promoted to head coach for the Houston Cougars diving team, a position that she was to hold until 2014. During her tenure at UH, she was awarded the NCAA Diving Coach of the Year four times, and members of her team won a total of 51 CSCAA All-America honours and eight NCAA championships.

Figueiredo's first international recruit to the UH diving team was British diver Olivia Clark, in the early 1990s. Through Clark's involvement with the British team, Figueiredo got to know most of the British divers and team personnel. Hence, when the British Olympic team diving coach was unable to participate in the run up to the 1996 Olympic Games in Atlanta, it was to her that British swimming CEO, David Sparkes, turned to fill the role, despite Clark not having been selected. Although she only had one month with the team prior to the start of the competition, Hayley Allen reached the final of the women's 10 m platform competition.

Later in the 1990s, Figueiredo recruited Russian divers Vera Ilyina and Yulia Pakhalina to the UH team. Through them, she became part of the Russian Olympic team organization, and she coached Ilyina and Pakhalina to the gold medal in the women's 3 m springboard synchro event at the 2000 Sydney Olympics. After Ilyina's retirement, she continued with Pakhalina and new synchro partner Anastasia Pozdniakova. Under Figueiredo's regime, Pakhalina and Pozdniakova took the silver medal in the women's 3 m springboard synchro at the 2008 Beijing Olympic Games.

In October 2013, Figueiredo was approached by British Diving's performance director, Alexei Evangulov, to invite her go to London to give a presentation to the British diving team. During that visit she met with British diving prodigy, Tom Daley, who at the time was planning to move to London from his native Plymouth, and was looking for a new coach. He offered Figueiredo the job, and visited her in Houston later in 2013 to discuss the move further. At that time, Daley had already won a bronze medal at the 2012 London Olympic Games, but Figueiredo saw that he had greater potential. Figueiredo moved to London and started working with Daley in January 2014. Since that time, Daley and his synchro partners – Daniel Goodfellow, Matty Lee, and Noah Williams – have won bronze at the 2016 Rio Olympics, the gold medal at the 2020 Tokyo Olympics, and silver at the 2024 Paris Olympics, respectively, all under the guidance of Figueiredo.

In November 2024, Figueiredo received an International Olympic Committee Coaches Lifetime Achievement Award. She announced she was leaving her post at Aquatics GB in February 2025.

Figueiredo was named head diving coach for men and women at the University of Tennessee in April 2025, replacing the retiring Dave Parrington.
