= Diving at the 2012 European Aquatics Championships – Men's 10 m platform =

The men's 10 m platform competition of the diving events at the 2012 European Aquatics Championships was held on May 20.

== Medalists ==
| Gold | Silver | Bronze |
|---|---|---|
| Thomas Daley; Great Britain | Victor Minibaev; Russia | Gleb Galperin; Russia |

== Results ==
The preliminary round was held at 14:00 local time. The final was held at 19:30.

| Rank | Diver | Nationality | Preliminary | | Final | |
| Rank | Diver | Nationality | Points | Rank | Points | Rank |
|---|---|---|---|---|---|---|
| 1st place, gold medalist(s) | Thomas Daley | Great Britain | 531.85 | 1 | 565.05 | 1 |
| 2nd place, silver medalist(s) | Victor Minibaev | Russia | 479.90 | 2 | 515.40 | 2 |
| 3rd place, bronze medalist(s) | Gleb Galperin | Russia | 396.75 | 7 | 511.55 | 3 |
| 4 | Oleksandr Bondar | Ukraine | 470.40 | 3 | 511.20 | 4 |
| 5 | Anton Zakharov | Ukraine | 419.15 | 5 | 483.90 | 5 |
| 6 | Andrea Chiarabini | Italy | 415.15 | 6 | 433.90 | 6 |
| 7 | Christofer Eskilsson | Sweden | 373.45 | 11 | 417.75 | 7 |
| 8 | Vadim Kaptur | Belarus | 433.60 | 4 | 407.15 | 8 |
| 9 | Francesco Dell'Uomo | Italy | 386.85 | 10 | 384.00 | 9 |
| 10 | Timofei Hordeichik | Belarus | 389.10 | 8 | 379.45 | 10 |
| 11 | Jesper Tolvers | Sweden | 366.35 | 12 | 376.45 | 11 |
| 12 | Amund Gismervik | Norway | 387.55 | 9 | 355.40 | 12 |
| 13 | Espen Valheim | Norway | 302.55 | 13 | | |
| 14 | Heikki Mäkikallo | Finland | 279.50 | 14 | | |
