= Diving at the 2009 World Aquatics Championships – Men's 10 metre platform =

Following are the results of the Men's 10 metre platform diving event at the 2009 World Aquatics Championships held in Rome, Italy, from July 17 to August 2, 2009.

== Results ==
Green denotes finalists

Rank	Diver	Nationality	Preliminary		Semifinal		Final	
Rank	Diver	Nationality	Points	Rank	Points	Rank	Points	Rank
1st place, gold medalist(s)	Tom Daley	Great Britain	475.80	5	498.75	3	539.85	1
2nd place, silver medalist(s)	Qiu Bo	China	515.75	1	521.15	1	532.20	2
3rd place, bronze medalist(s)	Zhou Lüxin	China	495.55	3	494.75	4	530.55	3
4	Matthew Mitcham	Australia	491.50	4	499.00	2	529.50	4
5	Aleksei Kravchenko	Russia	429.65	13	434.60	9	493.90	5
6	David Boudia	United States	472.60	7	485.25	6	491.80	6
7	Sascha Klein	Germany	435.55	11	426.25	10	478.90	7
8	Constantin Popovici	Romania	471.80	8	470.10	7	476.20	8
9	Riley McCormick	Canada	427.80	15	446.00	8	470.30	9
10	Rommel Pacheco	Mexico	473.85	6	486.10	5	456.20	10
11	Jonathan Ruvalcaba	Mexico	451.45	10	423.30	12	390.35	11
12	Bryan Nickson Lomas	Malaysia	418.90	17	425.65	11	372.10	12
13	Vadim Kaptur	Belarus	431.90	12	418.50	13		
14	Kostyantyn Milyayev	Ukraine	455.40	9	416.50	14		
15	Hugo Parisi	Brazil	416.10	18	413.95	15		
16	José Guerra	Cuba	515.65	2	409.55	16		
17	Anton Zakharov	Ukraine	428.90	14	397.30	17		
18	Victor Minibaev	Russia	425.90	16	386.70	18		
19	Francesco Dell'Uomo	Italy	409.45	19				
20	Nick McCrory	United States	401.00	20				
21	Timofei Hordeichik	Belarus	397.35	21				
22	Kim Chon-Man	North Korea	394.30	22				
23	Kazuki Murakami	Japan	388.10	23				
24	Víctor Ortega	Colombia	372.75	24				
25	Sebastián Villa	Colombia	367.90	25				
26	Maicol Verzotto	Italy	362.90	26				
27	Edickson Contreras	Venezuela	360.35	27				
28	Sho Sakai	Japan	357.85	28				
29	Max Brick	Great Britain	354.00	29				
30	Jeinkler Aguirre	Cuba	353.90	30				
31	Eric Sehn	Canada	341.15	31				
32	Stefan Rudolph	Germany	335.60	32				
33	Christoffer Eskilsson	Sweden	333.40	33				
34	Rui Marinho	Portugal	327.65	34				
35	Enrique Rojas	Venezuela	322.85	35				
36	Foo Chuen Li	Hong Kong	290.60	36				
37	Gevorg Papoyan	Armenia	237.00	37				
