= Diving at the 2014 European Aquatics Championships – Men's 10 m platform =

Men's 10 m platform at the Diving at the 2014 European Aquatics Championships
- Dates: 23 August
- Competitors: 15 from 11 nations
- Winning points: 586.10

Medalists
gold medal	Viktor Minibaev	Russia
silver medal	Tom Daley	Great Britain
bronze medal	Sascha Klein	Germany

The Men's 10 m platform competition of the 2014 European Aquatics Championships was held on 23 August.

== Results ==
The preliminary round was held at 10:00 and the final round at 14:00.

Green denotes finalists

Rank	Diver	Nationality	Preliminary		Final	
Rank	Diver	Nationality	Points	Rank	Points	Rank
1st place, gold medalist(s)	Viktor Minibaev	Russia	517.90	1	586.10	1
2nd place, silver medalist(s)	Tom Daley	Great Britain	502.25	3	535.45	2
3rd place, bronze medalist(s)	Sascha Klein	Germany	512.10	2	530.90	3
4	Patrick Hausding	Germany	453.90	4	515.40	4
5	Nikita Shleikher	Russia	431.05	5	464.50	5
6	Vadim Kaptur	Belarus	408.15	8	431.15	6
7	Francesco Dell'Uomo	Italy	413.10	7	422.50	7
8	Oleksandr Bondar	Ukraine	427.95	6	419.55	8
9	Benjamin Auffret	France	385.30	10	403.15	9
10	Cătălin Cozma	Romania	365.30	11	400.35	10
11	Jesper Tolvers	Sweden	388.40	9	397.30	11
12	James Denny	Great Britain	357.30	12	311.60	12
13	Espen Valheim	Norway	334.85	13		
14	Lois Szymczak	France	333.90	14		
15	Krisztián Somhegyi	Hungary	333.20	15		
