= Plymouth Life Centre Indoor Bowls Club =

Indoor bowls club

The Plymouth Life Centre Indoor Bowls Club, an indoor bowls club, was formed in 1969 under the name of Plymouth Indoor Bowls Club, initially playing on a roll out mat by the swimming pool in Central Park, Plymouth. The club has gone from strength to strength, members winning national and regional titles. The club re-located to Plymouth Life Centre in 2011 and took their new name to reflect their new location. In 2012, they raised £1,662.65 for the Highbury Trust in Plymouth. The club is affiliated to the EIBA, (English Indoor Bowling Association Ltd). In 2014, they gained recognition from Active Devon when they became the first sports club to be awarded clubmark accreditation by Active Devon.
