= 2016 FINA Diving World Cup – Men's 10 metre platform =

The Men's 10 metre platform competition of the diving events at the 2016 FINA Diving World Cup took place between 23 and 24 February.

== Results ==
The preliminary round was held on 23 February at 10:00. The semifinal was held on 24 February at 10:00. The final was held on 24 February at 13:15.

Green denotes finalists

Blue denotes semifinalists

Rank	Diver	Nationality	Preliminary		Semifinal		Final	
Rank	Diver	Nationality	Points	Rank	Points	Rank	Points	Rank
1st place, gold medalist(s)	Qiu Bo	China	535.15	1	549.70	1	557.75	1
2nd place, silver medalist(s)	Chen Aisen	China	459.35	4	541.60	2	534.25	2
3rd place, bronze medalist(s)	David Dinsmore	United States	412.15	10	451.30	5	497.05	3
4	Steele Johnson	United States	402.00	14	449.70	6	481.40	4
5	Sascha Klein	Germany	470.80	3	411.95	12	479.35	5
6	Rafael Quintero	Puerto Rico	425.20	8	455.85	4	465.85	6
7	Maxim Bouchard	Canada	436.55	7	444.15	8	452.50	7
8	Domonic Bedggood	Australia	452.90	5	445.65	7	437.30	8
9	Ivan Garcia	Mexico	497.75	2	477.10	3	422.80	9
10	Nikita Shleikher	Russia	423.70	9	425.60	9	408.35	10
11	Haram Woo	South Korea	405.30	12	416.90	11	407.55	11
12	Victor Ortega	Colombia	402.80	13	418.95	10	406.35	12
13	German Sanchez	Mexico	406.00	11	407.30	13		
14	Timo Barthel	Germany	382.50	17	390.45	14		
15	Sebastian Villa	Colombia	436.70	6	364.60	15		
16	Jesus Liranzo	Venezuela	384.50	16	357.85	16		
17	Robert Paez	Venezuela	397.00	15	340.35	17		
18	Hugo Parisi	Brazil	379.65	18	72.50	18		
19	Maicol Verzotto	Italy	377.30	19				
20	Vincent Riendeau	Canada	375.55	20				
21	Yauheni Karaliou	Belarus	373.80	21				
22	Jesper Tolvers	Sweden	366.00	22				
23	Isaac Souza	Brazil	362.55	23				
24	Yeong-nam Kim	South Korea	358.35	24				
25	Espen Valheim	Norway	357.10	25				
26	Maksym Dolgov	Ukraine	357.00	26				
27	Vladimir Harutyunyan	Armenia	354.90	27				
28	Youssef Ezzat	Egypt	344.85	28				
29	Frandiel Gomez	Dominican Republic	344.20	29				
30	Matty Lee	United Kingdom	334.80	30				
31	Lev Sargsyan	Armenia	324.10	31				
32	James Denny	United Kingdom	313.10	32				
33	Mohab El-Kordy	Egypt	308.60	33				
34	Francesco Dell'uomo	Italy	307.85	34				
35	Shahnam Nazarpour	Iran	296.95	35				
36	Yiwei Chew	Malaysia	290.55	36				
