= Aleksei Kravchenko =

Aleksei Kravchenko (Russian: Алексе́й Кра́вченко) may refer to:

- Aleksei Ilyich Kravchenko (1889–1940), Russian painter, illustrator, draughtsman and printmaker
- Aleksei Kravchenko (actor) (Aleksei Yevgenyevich Kravchenko, born 1969), Soviet and Russian actor
- Aleksei Igorevich Kravchenko (* 1986), Russian diver, took part in Diving at the 2009 World Aquatics Championships – Men's 10 metre platform
