= Olympic Dreams =

Olympic Dreams could refer to two pieces of media produced related to the Olympic Games:

- Olympic Dreams (film), a 2019 American film directed by Jeremy Teicher
- Olympic Dreams (TV Series), a 2007–08 British television show on BBC
