= Diving at the 2012 Summer Olympics – Men's 10 metre platform =

Men's 10 metre platform diving at the Games of the XXX Olympiad
- Venue: Aquatics Centre
- Date: 10–11 August
- Competitors: 32 from 19 nations
- Winning total: 568.65 points

Medalists
1st place, gold medalist(s)		David Boudia	United States
2nd place, silver medalist(s)		Qiu Bo	China
3rd place, bronze medalist(s)		Tom Daley	Great Britain

The men's 10 metre platform diving competition at the 2012 Olympic Games in London took place on 10 and 11 August at the Aquatics Centre within the Olympic Park.

The gold medal was won by David Boudia from the United States. China's Qiu Bo won silver and Tom Daley of Great Britain took bronze.

== Format ==
The competition involved three rounds:

- Preliminary round: All 32 divers perform six dives; the top 18 divers advance to the semifinal.
- Semi-final: The 18 divers perform six dives; the scores of the qualifications are erased and the top 12 divers advance to the final.
- Final: The 12 divers perform six dives; the semifinal scores are erased and the top three divers win the gold, silver and bronze medals accordingly.

== Schedule ==
All times are British Summer Time (UTC+1)

Date	Time	Round
Friday 10 August 2012	19:00	Preliminary
Saturday 11 August 2012	10:00; 20:30	Semifinal; Final

== Results ==
Rank	Diver	Nation	Preliminary		Semifinal								Final						
Rank	Diver	Nation	Points	Rank	Dive 1	Dive 2	Dive 3	Dive 4	Dive 5	Dive 6	Points	Rank	Dive 1	Dive 2	Dive 3	Dive 4	Dive 5	Dive 6	Points
1st place, gold medalist(s)	David Boudia	United States	439.15	18	88.20	86.40	94.35	85.80	82.80	93.60	531.15	3	97.20	86.40	99.90	90.75	91.80	102.60	568.65
2nd place, silver medalist(s)	Qiu Bo	China	563.70	1	89.60	85.75	94.05	102.60	94.35	97.20	563.55	1	91.20	94.50	92.40	93.60	94.35	100.80	566.85
3rd place, bronze medalist(s)	Tom Daley	Great Britain	448.45	15	81.00	86.40	84.00	88.80	91.80	89.10	521.10	4	91.80*	86.40	92.75	98.05	97.20	90.75	556.95
4	Victor Minibaev	Russia	449.05	14	81.60	86.95	79.20	81.00	91.80	93.60	514.15	6	81.60	92.50	89.10	81.00	91.80	91.80	527.80
5	José Guerra	Cuba	440.90	17	76.50	88.20	86.40	81.60	79.20	90.00	501.90	9	76.50	88.20	86.40	96.90	82.50	97.20	527.70
6	Lin Yue	China	532.15	2	81.60	94.05	102.60	94.35	75.60	93.60	541.80	2	91.20	94.05	91.80	68.45	91.80	90.00	527.30
7	Iván García	Mexico	491.70	6	88.80	87.45	86.10	81.00	74.25	79.80	497.40	10	83.25	82.50	98.40	81.00	89.10	87.40	521.65
8	Martin Wolfram	Germany	496.80	4	91.80	86.40	79.20	86.40	86.40	88.80	519.00	5	97.20	86.40	77.55	64.80	88.20	92.50	506.65
9	Nicholas McCrory	United States	480.90	8	76.80	83.20	83.25	89.10	84.15	90.00	506.50	7	86.40	75.20	83.25	79.20	84.15	97.20	505.40
10	Sascha Klein	Germany	525.05	3	76.80	90.65	89.25	91.80	74.25	81.00	503.75	8	80.00	83.25	66.50	97.20	77.55	91.80	496.30
11	Riley McCormick	Canada	452.75	11	72.00	86.40	81.60	79.20	79.20	97.20	495.60	12	76.50	86.40	81.60	79.20	74.25	95.40	493.35
12	Oleksandr Bondar	Ukraine	481.65	7	78.40	77.70	82.80	89.10	89.10	79.20	496.30	11	72.00	88.80	82.80	79.20	56.10	64.80	443.70
13	Matthew Mitcham	Australia	457.20	9	75.00	85.80	86.40	90.75	74.25	70.20	482.40	13	did not advance						
14	Germán Sánchez	Mexico	495.85	5	85.80	91.20	36.30	86.10	89.10	88.80	477.30	14	did not advance						
15	Anton Zakharov	Ukraine	451.35	12	76.80	86.40	88.80	84.15	36.75	91.80	464.70	15	did not advance						
16	Gleb Galperin	Russia	445.60	16	81.30	37.40	72.00	89.10	89.10	84.60	453.80	16	did not advance						
17	Víctor Ortega	Colombia	450.60	13	68.80	63.00	69.30	78.40	80.85	79.20	439.55	17	did not advance						
18	Jeinkler Aguirre	Cuba	453.50	10	72.00	75.20	55.80	83.20	64.35	86.40	436.95	18	did not advance						
19	Bryan Lomas	Malaysia	434.95	19	did not advance														
20	James Connor	Australia	427.45	20	did not advance														
21	Vadim Kaptur	Belarus	420.60	21	did not advance														
22	Sebastián Villa	Colombia	419.25	22	did not advance														
23	Peter Waterfield	Great Britain	412.45	23	did not advance														
24	Amund Gismervik	Norway	401.55	24	did not advance														
25	Christofer Eskilsson	Sweden	375.30	25	did not advance														
26	Park Ji-Ho	South Korea	370.50	26	did not advance														
27	Francesco Dell'Uomo	Italy	370.25	27	did not advance														
28	Andrea Chiarabini	Italy	367.75	28	did not advance														
29	Eric Sehn	Canada	363.90	29	did not advance														
30	Hugo Parisi	Brazil	363.70	30	did not advance														
31	Timofei Hordeichik	Belarus	350.05	31	did not advance														
32	Ri Hyun-Ju	North Korea	331.30	32	did not advance														

*Daley was awarded a re-dive due to the audience's use of flash photography. His score before the challenge was 75.60.
