= Tom Daley =

English diver (born 1994)

Tom Daley OBE OLY
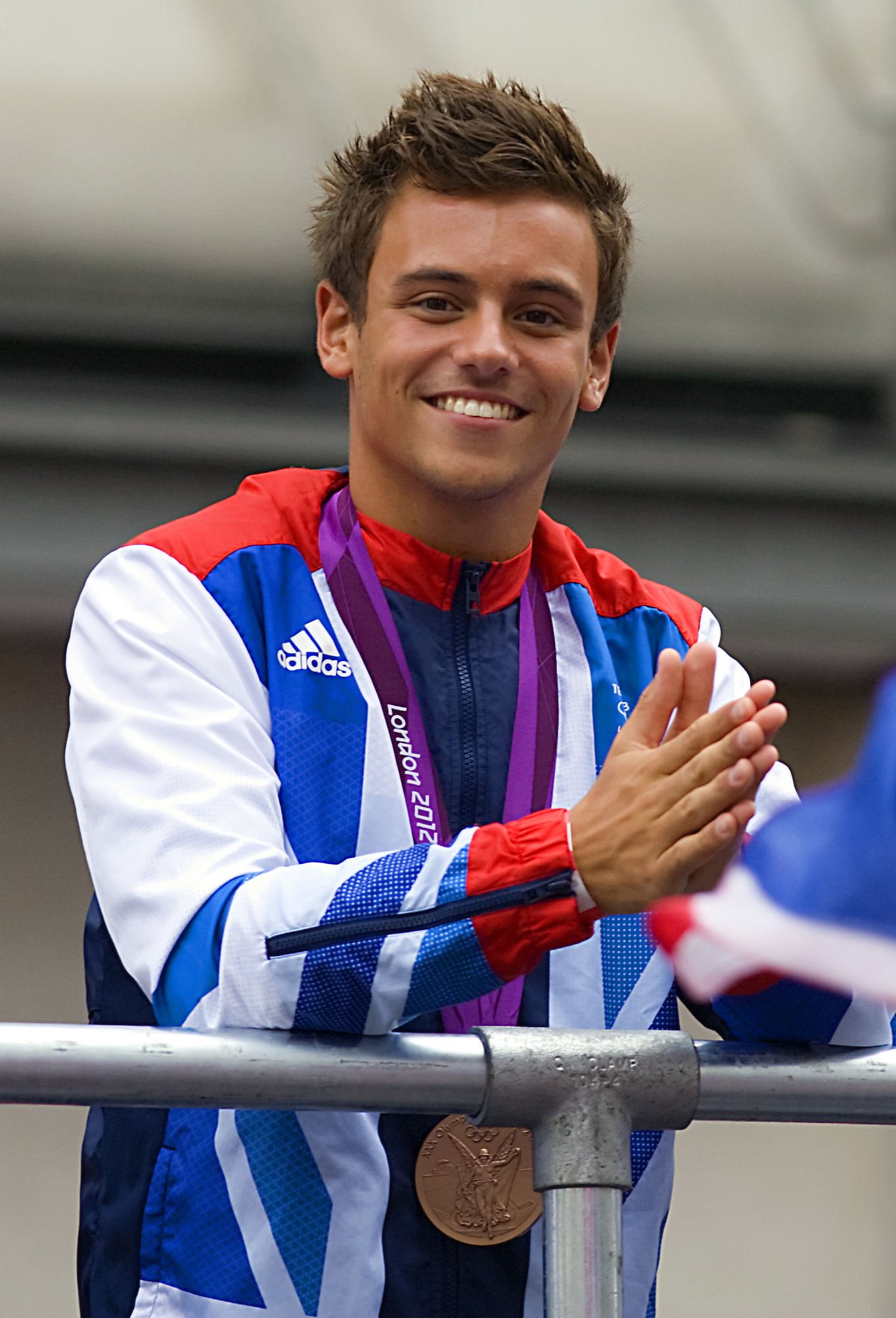
- Daley at the London Olympics in 2012

Personal information
- Full name: Thomas Robert Daley
- Born: 21 May 1994 (age 32) Plymouth, Devon, England
- Occupations: Diver; television personality
- Height: 1.73 m (5 ft 8 in)
- Weight: 74 kg (163 lb)
- Spouse: Dustin Lance Black (m. 2017)
- Children: 2

Sport
- Country: Great Britain; England
- Sport: Diving
- Events: 3 m, 3 m synchro, 10 m, 10 m synchro
- Club: Plymouth Diving Club; London High Performance Centre
- Partners: Noah Williams; Matty Lee; Daniel Goodfellow; Grace Reid
- Coached by: Jane Figueiredo
Medal record
Diving
Event	1st	2nd	3rd
Olympic Games	1	1	3
World Championships	4	2	2
European Championships	5	3	0
Commonwealth Games	4	1	0
Total	14	7	5
Representing Great Britain
Olympic Games
Gold medal – first place	2020 Tokyo	10 m synchro
Silver medal – second place	2024 Paris	10 m synchro
Bronze medal – third place	2012 London	10 m platform
Bronze medal – third place	2016 Rio de Janeiro	10 m synchro
Bronze medal – third place	2020 Tokyo	10 m platform
World Championships
Gold medal – first place	2009 Rome	10 m platform
Gold medal – first place	2015 Kazan	Team event
Gold medal – first place	2017 Budapest	10 m platform
Gold medal – first place	2024 Doha	Team event
Silver medal – second place	2017 Budapest	3 m mixed synchro
Silver medal – second place	2024 Doha	10 m synchro
Bronze medal – third place	2015 Kazan	10 m platform
Bronze medal – third place	2019 Gwangju	10 m synchro
European Championships
Gold medal – first place	2008 Eindhoven	10 m platform
Gold medal – first place	2012 Eindhoven	10 m platform
Gold medal – first place	2016 London	10 m platform
Gold medal – first place	2016 London	Mixed 3 m synchro
Gold medal – first place	2020 Budapest	10 m synchro
Silver medal – second place	2014 Berlin	10 m platform
Silver medal – second place	2016 London	10 m synchro
Silver medal – second place	2020 Budapest	10 m platform
Junior World Championships
Gold medal – first place	2012 Adelaide	10 m platform
Gold medal – first place	2012 Adelaide	Synchro 3 m springboard
Silver medal – second place	2008 Aachen	10 m platform
Silver medal – second place	2008 Aachen	3 m springboard
Representing England
Commonwealth Games
Gold medal – first place	2010 Delhi	10 m platform
Gold medal – first place	2010 Delhi	10 m synchro
Gold medal – first place	2014 Glasgow	10 m platform
Gold medal – first place	2018 Gold Coast	10 m synchro
Silver medal – second place	2014 Glasgow	10 m synchro

Thomas Robert Daley (born 21 May 1994) is an English retired diver, YouTuber and television personality. He is an Olympic champion in the men's synchronised 10-metre platform event at the 2020 Olympics and double world champion in the FINA 10-metre platform event, winning in 2009 at the age of fifteen, and again in 2017. He is an Olympic bronze medallist in the 2012 platform event, the 2016 synchronised event, and the 2020 platform event. He won the silver medal in the men's synchronised 10-metre at the 2024 Olympics, making him the first British diver to win 5 Olympic medals. Daley also competed in team events, winning the inaugural mixed team World title in 2015, and repeating the win in 2024, his fourth World title in all. He is an Olympic champion, four-time World Champion, a two-time junior World Champion, a five-time European champion and four-time Commonwealth champion.

Daley started diving at the age of eight and is a member of Plymouth Diving Club, where his talent was identified early, and made an impact in national and international competitions from age nine. He represented Great Britain at the 2008 Summer Olympics where he was Britain's youngest competitor, age fourteen, and the youngest from any nation to participate in a final. In 2009, Daley reached a career-best ranking of number one in the FINA World Aquatics Championships Diving Rankings for the 10 m platform. He won two gold medals for England at the 2010 Commonwealth Games, in the 10 m synchro diving (with Max Brick) and the 10 m Individual Platform competition.

After the 2012 Summer Olympics and a summer of increased sporting interest amongst the UK public, television network ITV approached Daley to have a role in their new celebrity diving reality TV show Splash! Daley made his debut in the show's premiere on 5 January 2013 as a mentor to the celebrity competitors taking part. In 2023 Daley became an assistant diving coach at UCLA. In August 2024, a day after the 2024 Summer Olympics concluded, Daley announced his retirement from professional diving.

== Early life ==
Thomas Robert Daley was born on 21 May 1994 at Derriford Hospital in Plymouth, Devon, England, the son of Debbie (née Selvester) and Robert Daley. He has two brothers – William who is three years younger, and Ben who is five years younger. Their father, Robert, died from a brain tumour on 27 May 2011, aged 40, a few days after Daley's 17th birthday.

Daley's interest in diving began at the age of eight after his father took him to the local pool and Daley noticed divers there. He began diving soon after. His talent was quickly spotted by his coach, Andy Banks. His early diving heroes were Canadian diver Alexandre Despatie, who won gold at the 1998 Commonwealth Games at the age of 13, and British diver Leon Taylor, who later mentored him. Daley was spotted by a coach taking part in regular diving lessons and was placed in a competitive squad in September 2002. His first competition was the National Novice Championships in April 2003 where he won a medal in the 8/9-year-old boys category. In September 2003, he took part in an invitational event in Southampton where he won the 1 m, 3 m and platform events, and first made his mark on the wider audience. Daley won his age group at the British Championships in the 1 m springboard, the 3 m springboard, and platform in 2004, 2005, and 2006.

In June 2004, the month after his 10th birthday, he won the platform competition in the National Junior (under-18) group, making him the youngest winner of that event. In 2005, Daley competed as a guest competitor in the Australian Elite Junior Nationals and placed first in platform and second in 3 m springboard in the 14–15 age group event. He also competed in the 14–15 category at the 2005 Aachen Junior International, placing second in platform and third in 3 m springboard. He met the qualification standard for the 2006 Commonwealth Games, but was not selected for the England team because of his age. In 2006, he was the under-18 British champion in platform and 3 m springboard, and he placed second in the 10 m platform at the 2007 senior British Championships, which were held in December 2006.

=== Education ===
From age 11 to 14, Daley attended Eggbuckland Community College in Plymouth. At 13, he became a celebrity supporter of Childline, a children's helpline run by the National Society for the Prevention of Cruelty to Children (NSPCC), and at that time it was revealed that he had been bullied eighteen months earlier. In April 2009, Daley told Plymouth's main local newspaper The Herald that he had been bullied at school since the Olympics, and his father told the BBC that he had temporarily withdrawn him from that school because its response to the problem had been "ineffective". Daley was praised in the media for speaking out about his problem.

Daley was offered a full scholarship to board at independent school Brighton College, but his father turned this down due to the distance from home, and instead accepted a "very significant scholarship" from local independent school Plymouth College.

Daley took his GCSEs in small batches to fit around his diving commitments. He persuaded supermodel Kate Moss to pose for a recreation of an original portrait by David Hockney, as part of a GCSE photography project recreating great works of art, after meeting her on a photo shoot for Italian Vogue.

In 2012, Daley finished his two-year A-level studies in mathematics, Spanish and photography. Daley decided not to undertake an International Baccalaureate course because of the pressures he faced in his preparation for the 2012 Olympics. He passed all GCSE and A-level exams with A or A*.

== International competitions ==
=== 2007 ===
In January 2007, at the age of twelve, Daley was given a special dispensation to compete at the 2007 Australian Youth Olympic Festival. The usual minimum age is fifteen. Competing with a persistent thumb injury, Daley won the silver medal with synchro-partner Callum Johnstone in the 10 m synchronised diving final.

Daley, who trained at the Central Park Pool in Plymouth, was given National Lottery funding to help him in covering his training and competition expenses, and the cost of related support services.

Later in 2007, he won the senior platform title at the Amateur Swimming Association (ASA) National Championships, the national championship for English divers. In 2007, he also began to compete on International Swimming Federation's (FINA) international diving circuit of Grand Prix and World Series events, twice finishing fourth in individual competition.

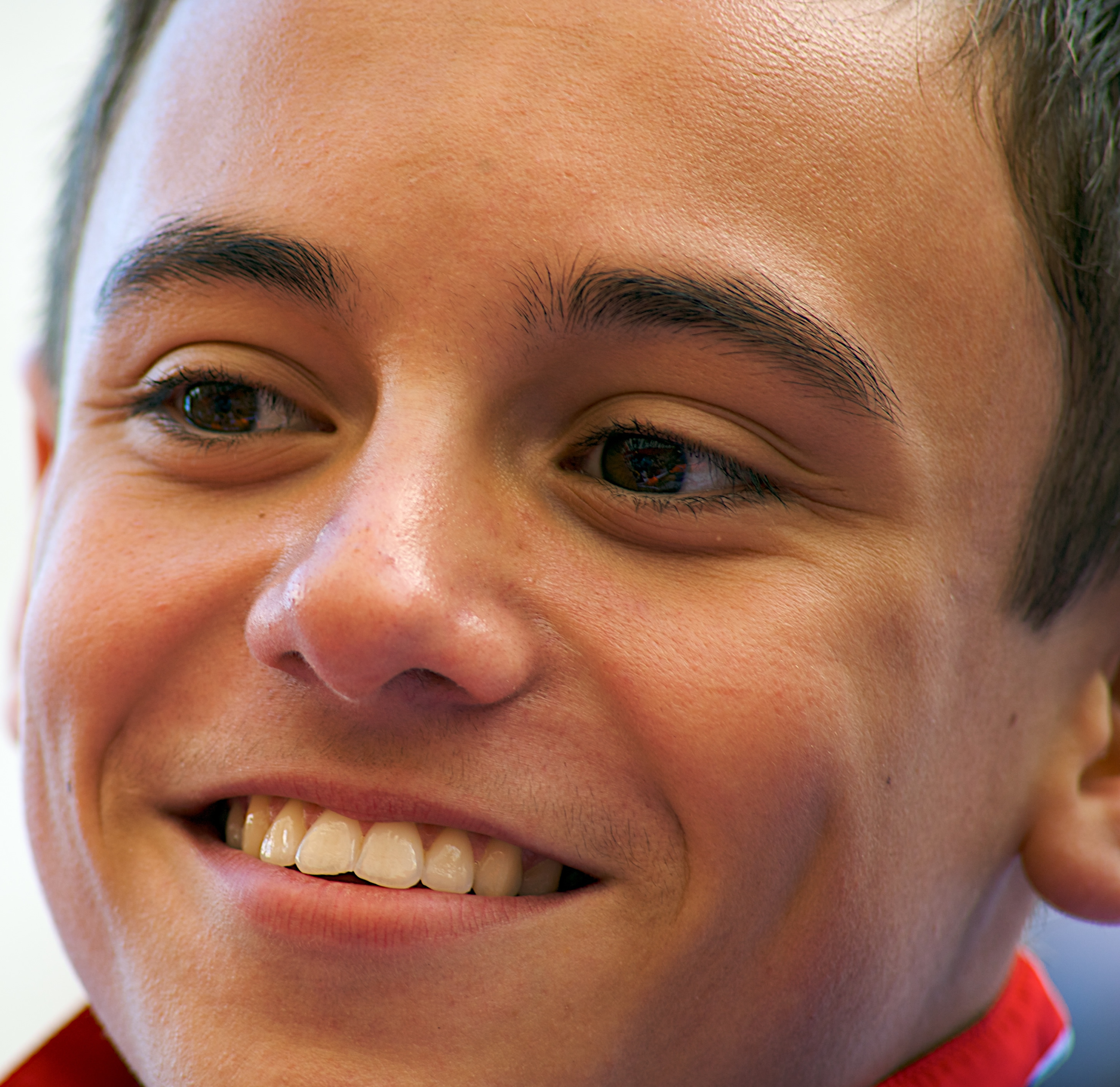
Daley in 2008

Daley won the 2007 BBC Sports Personality of the Year Young Personality award. He was considered a medal prospect for the 2012 Summer Olympics in London from this time, and was one of the British Olympians being tracked through the years leading up to London 2012 by the BBC television series Olympic Dreams.

=== 2008 ===
In January 2008, Daley won the 10 m platform event at the British Championships and became the youngest winner of the senior British 10 m title. He also won the 10 m platform synchro title with new partner Blake Aldridge.

Two weeks later, Daley won his first medals on the FINA circuit, winning a bronze in the individual platform competition and a silver in synchro at the Madrid Grand Prix. Daley and Aldridge won bronze in synchro at the 2008 FINA Diving World Cup. Their score was a British record and Daley became the youngest ever male medallist in a world diving event. Daley came seventh in the individual competition. In March 2008, Daley became the youngest person to win a gold medal at the European Championships, held in Eindhoven. The previous youngest winner was the Scottish swimmer Ian Black, who won a European gold in 1958 at the age of 17.

Daley qualified for the Beijing 2008 Olympics in the individual 10 m dive competition and, following the retirement of 2004 silver medallist Leon Taylor, in the 10 m platform synchro competition. Some in the British media reported that in competing he would become the youngest-ever male British Olympian, until it was ascertained that Ken Lester, cox to the rowing pair at the 1960 Summer Olympics, had been 13 years and 144 days old at the time. In the Olympic synchronized 10 m platform competition, they placed eighth, while in the individual 10 m platform competition, he finished seventh.

A month after his appearance at the Olympics, Daley participated in the FINA Junior World Championships for the first time (being too young to enter before). He finished second in the category "B" platform competition (for 14- and 15-year-old boys) with 549.60 points, between China's Qiu Bo (551.85 points) and Wu Dongliang (474.00 points). He came second in the 3-metre springboard competition in the same category with 485.25 points, sandwiched between the two Chinese divers, Wu Dongliang (510.25 points) and Wang Peng (470.40 points).

=== 2009 ===
In February 2009, Daley retained his individual British 10 m championship, setting a competition personal best score of 517.55 points, 133.45 points ahead of the second-placed diver. He was unable to defend his 10 m synchronized title, as his dive partner Blake Aldridge had been injured in a brawl at a nightclub several days before the championships and was unable to dive. In March 2009, he improved his personal best to 540.70 in coming third at a Diving World Series event in China, and the following month he improved it to 540.85 while finishing second at the World Series event in Sheffield.

During the Olympics, Daley had a row with diving partner Blake Aldridge when the latter phoned his mother between rounds. When Aldridge missed the British Championships because of the injury sustained in the nightclub incident, Daley's father said he would like his son to have a different diving partner. In April 2009, he started to dive with Max Brick, who is two years his senior, compared with the twelve-year gap with Aldridge. The pair achieved a silver medal in the 10 m synchronized event at Fort Lauderdale on 8 May 2009. Daley won the individual event in a new personal best of 554.90, scoring a perfect set of seven 10s for one of his dives.

In the 2009 FINA World Championships, held in Rome, Daley unexpectedly won the individual platform title despite his lower tariff, with a score of 539.85 points, when his opponents had poor final dives – Qiu Bo finished on 532.20 points, Zhou Luxin on 530.55. In the 10 m platform synchronized event at the World Championships, Daley and Brick finished in 9th place following an inconsistent series of dives by the new pairing.

=== 2010 ===
In the February 2010 British Championships individual 10 m competition, Daley unveiled his 5255B dive (back two-and-a-half somersault, one-and-a-half twists, with pike) in competition for the first time, giving him a 3.6 tariff dive (reduced from 3.8 in FINA's September 2009 DD tables). In this competition Daley finished in second place, 40.05 points behind Peter Waterfield.

In the March 2010 FINA Diving World Series event in Qingdao individual 10 m competition, Daley showcased his two new dives and finished in 4th place, 520.35 points (his best score of the year).

In the first April 2010 FINA Diving World Series event held in Veracruz, Mexico, Daley failed to qualify for the final round of the individual 10 m competition. A second event was held in the same venue three days later to replace the Sheffield DWS event which was cancelled because of the eruption of the Icelandic volcano Eyjafjallajökull. Daley finished in fourth place, with a score of 519.70 points – his second highest score of the season (just 0.8 points away from bronze).

In August 2010, Daley attended the European Championships in Budapest, Hungary, intending to defend his individual 10 m title. However, an injury to his triceps muscle in the 10 m synchro competition forced his withdrawal from the synchro and individual 10 m competitions, and placed his participation in the inaugural Youth Olympics in Singapore in the following two weeks in doubt. It was later announced that Daley would dive in the 3 m springboard but not in the 10 m platform. Daley took part in the 3 m springboard diving competition and finished in 9th place.

On 12 October 2010, Daley attended the 2010 Commonwealth Games in New Delhi, India. He and his teammate Max Brick won the gold medal for Synchronized 10 m Platform Competition. The following day he also won gold in the 10 m Individual Platform competition.

In November 2010, Daley was announced as a nominated sportsman for the BBC Sports Personality of the Year 2010 and the BBC Young Sports Personality of the Year 2010. He won BBC Young Sports Personality of the Year 2010 for the third time in his career, and is the first person to receive this award three times.

=== 2011 ===
For the 2011 season, Daley was paired in the synchronized competitions with 2004 Athens Olympic silver medallist Peter Waterfield in British Swimming's continuing efforts to find the best synchro pairing for the 2012 Olympics. At the 2011 National Cup, the British Championship was held in the new Southend Swimming and Diving Centre on 28–30 January and Daley came second in the 3m springboard competition behind Jack Laugher. With Waterfield, he won the 10 m platform synchronized competition. The following day, Waterfield beat Daley to the individual 10 m platform title for the second successive year, by 494.25 points to 472.35, with Max Brick third with 399.80.

In the 2011 World Championships, held in Shanghai, China, he was again paired with Waterfield in the 10 m synchro event. In the week before the competition, Waterfield was struck by a flu-like illness for five days, and consequently they finished in sixth place. In the individual event, Daley finished in fifth place on 505.10 points, behind Qiu Bo (585.45), David Boudia (544.25), Sascha Klein (534.50), and Viktor Minibaev (527.50).

On 27 July 2011, Daley took the first dive in London's newly built Olympic Park Aquatics Centre marking the one-year countdown until the games begin. It was broadcast live on BBC One and when interviewed he said "Marking the one year to go, by diving in the Aquatics Centre is an incredible honour. Only a few years ago, this was a distant dream. The fact that I qualified at the weekend and am taking the first dive is a complete privilege. I can't wait for next year and the honour of representing Team GB."

=== 2012 ===
In the 2012 season, a thumb injury forced Daley's withdrawal from the National Cup a few days before the competition (the 10 m platform title was won by Max Brick). In February 2012, British Diving's Performance Director Alexei Evangulov criticised Daley's work ethic, stating that he feared Daley's media and commercial activities were to the detriment of his training for the Olympics – a comment which was seemingly backed up when Daley and Pete Waterfield could only finish 7th in the 10 m synchro competition in the FINA World Cup event held at the London Aquatics Centre.

Following a clear-the-air meeting between Daley, Evangulov, and Daley's representatives, Daley participated in the 2012 FINA Diving World Series. In the first event held in Dubai, Daley and Waterfield finished 4th in the 10 m synchro event, while Daley won silver in the individual 10 m event. In the event held in Beijing a week later, Daley and Waterfield won the silver medal in the 10 m synchro event, while in the individual event Daley won silver and Waterfield the bronze. Three weeks later, in the Moscow event, Daley won silver in the individual platform event, while the pairing finished fifth in the synchro. In the final DWS meet of the year, in Tijuana, Mexico, Daley won gold in the individual platform event, and the pairing with Waterfield won bronze in the synchro event, although the Chinese did not compete in these events at this meet. Over the whole 2012 Diving World Series, Daley and the Daley/Waterfield pairing won both the overall individual and synchro 10-metre competitions.

In April 2012, Daley won the British elite juniors 10-metre platform title by a margin of 140 points at the Plymouth Life Centre.

In May 2012, Daley regained the European 10-metre platform title when he won gold at the Eindhoven championships with a score of 565.05 points, 49.65 ahead of Viktor Minibaev in silver position.

In the British Gas Diving Championships held in Sheffield in June 2012, which were also the Olympic trials, Daley and Waterfield won the 10 m synchro platform title with a new British record score of 475.77, more than 140 points ahead of silver medallists Daniel Goodfellow and Ross Haslam on 333.72. In the individual 10 m championship, Daley regained the title for the first time since 2009 with a score of 547.60, ahead of Peter Waterfield on 452.80 and James Denny on 390.20.

==== Olympics ====
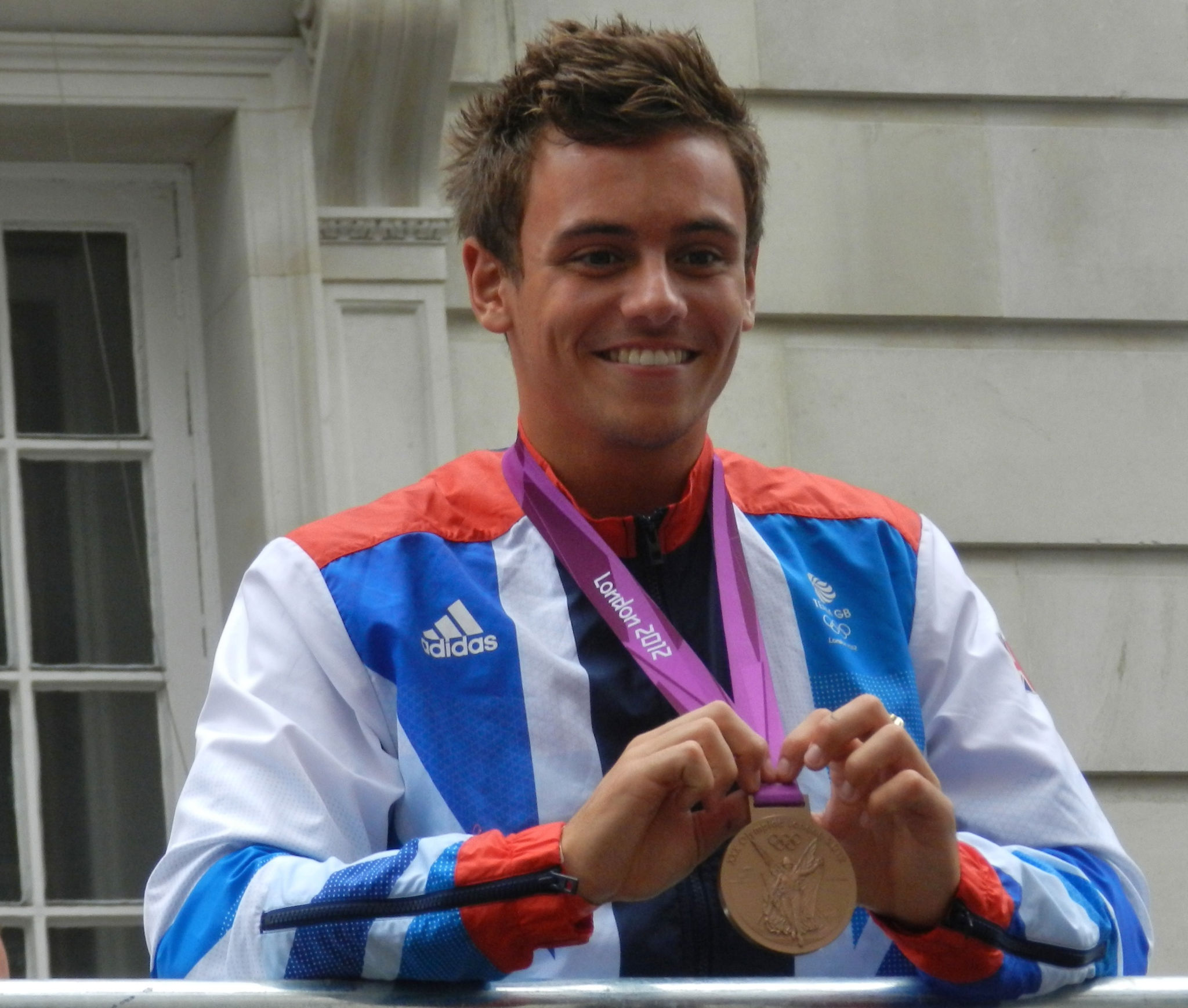
Daley holding his individual Olympic bronze medal at the Olympic Victory Parade, September 2012

In Britain, Daley had long been considered one of the "poster boys" of the 2012 Summer Olympics, (literally – an 80-foot tall banner depicting him adorned the John Lewis department store in Cardiff, while a 40-foot tall banner of his female equivalent, heptathlete Jessica Ennis, was on the Sheffield branch of the store chain.)

It was hoped that the 10 m men's synchronized platform event, on the first Monday of the Games, would provide Daley and Waterfield with an opportunity to supply Team GB's first medal of the Games. However, while the pairing was leading the competition after three dives, a poor reverse 3 1/2 somersaults with tuck in the fourth round put them out of contention and they ended the competition in fourth place on 454.65 points, behind the Chinese pairing of Cao Yuan and Zhang Yanquan on 486.78 points, the Mexican pairing of Iván García and Germán Sánchez on 468.90 points, and the US pairing of David Boudia and Nick McCrory on 463.47 points. Following this disappointment, there was controversy when Daley was the subject of some abusive Twitter messages, which resulted in the police arresting a 17-year-old boy in Weymouth, Dorset, and a 28-year-old professional footballer for publishing offensive messages.

Returning to the Aquatics Centre on the final Friday of the Games for the 10 m men's platform event, Daley initially gave his fans cause for concern with a poor performance in the preliminary round where he was ranked 15th of the 18 qualifying divers for the semi-final with 448.45 points (the eventual gold medal winner, David Boudia, ranked 18th). A much better performance in the semi-finals the next morning left Daley in fourth position on 521.10 points, behind Qiu Bo on 563.55, Lin Yue on 541.80, and Boudia on 531.15. The final round began in dramatic form when Daley's star status almost led to his undoing – a large number of camera flashes while he was diving distracted him and he only scored 75 points; a protest to the referee resulted in him being allowed to retake the dive, when he scored 91.80. By the beginning of the final round of dives in an enthralling contest, Daley was in the lead over Qiu Bo and David Boudia by 0.15 points, but Daley's final dive had a degree of difficulty of only 3.3 while his rivals both had 3.6 dives, and Daley won the bronze medal with 556.95 points while Boudia won gold with 568.65 points and Qiu Bo won silver with 566.85 points.

==== World Junior Diving Championships ====
At the 19th FINA World Junior Diving Championships, held in October 2012 in Adelaide, Australia, Daley led a strong British team and rather unexpectedly won the Boys "A" 3 m synchronized springboard competition together with Jack Laugher, who had won the individual 3 m competition, they had had little practice together. Daley and Laugher scored 338.85 points, over 30 points ahead of Ilia Kuzmin and Maxim Popkov.

In the 10 m individual platform event, Daley won the competition with a score of 663.95, ahead of Yang Jian on 611.95 and Chen Aisen on 597.20, scoring five 10's and two 9.5's on his fifth dive.

=== 2013 ===
In January 2013, Daley was involved in the ITV celebrity diving show Splash!, where he was an expert adviser to the celebrity contestants. While the show got a largely negative critical response, it nevertheless got the largest ratings on each of the five Saturday nights it was broadcast, and was renewed for a second season in 2014. Daley was warned by British Swimming chief executive David Sparkes that taking part in the series would risk damaging his chances of winning an Olympic gold medal in the future.

At the British Gas Diving Championships held at his home pool in Plymouth on 8–10 February, Daley only competed in the individual 10-metre platform event, which he won with 501.00 points, ahead of James Denny on 374.90 points and Daniel Goodfellow on 340.25 points. Daley did not compete in the 10 m synchro platform event, as his partner Peter Waterfield had lost his funding following this Olympiad, and his future synchro partner had yet to be determined.

Daley's participation in competitive diving in 2013 was seriously restricted by an injury in May. In April he won the 10 m competition at the Edinburgh leg of the Diving World Series, but while subsequently training for the Diving Grand Prix event at Fort Lauderdale, Florida, Daley injured his elbow and was forced to withdraw from the Fort Lauderdale competition and the subsequent DWS event in Mexico. In training for the 2013 World Championships, in Barcelona, Daley suffered a torn triceps for the third time, and only competed following intense medical attention and painkilling injections; he finished the individual 10 m competition in 6th place.

=== 2014 ===
At the beginning of 2014, Daley moved his training base from the Life Centre in Plymouth to the London Aquatics Centre at the Olympic Park in east London, with a new coach, Jane Figueiredo.

In January 2014 Daley was involved in the second series of Splash!. Ratings were not as good as the first season, and the show was cancelled.

In the FINA Diving World Series, Daley came third in the 10 m platform competition at the Beijing round, scoring 525.05 points, behind China's Cao Yuan on 579.45 and Qiu Bo on 534.05 points.

In 2014, Daley hosted a six-part travel series for ITV2 called Tom Daley Goes Global.

At the 2014 Commonwealth Games in Glasgow, Daley won a silver medal in the men's synchronized 10 m platform with diving partner James Denny and gold in the men's 10 m platform, with 516.55 points, retaining his title from the Commonwealth Games in Delhi in 2010.

In August 2014 at the European Championships in Berlin, the Daley/Denny partnership finished fourth in the 10 m platform synchro competition, in only their second competition, while Daley won the silver medal in the 10 m platform competition, with 535.45 points, behind Russia's Viktor Minibaev who had 586.10 points.

=== 2015 ===
For the 2015 season, Daley dropped the "demon dive" (backward 2.5 somersault with 2.5 twists, piked) which he had experienced difficulty with for several years, and replaced it with a forward 3.5 somersaults with one twist, which he called his "firework" dive and displayed for the first time at the British championships in Plymouth in February.

At the British championships held in his old home pool in Plymouth, Daley won the individual 10 m platform title for the fifth time, with 493.70 points, ahead of 14-year-old Matthew Dixon on 427.15, and Matty Lee on 413.20.

In the season's opening meet of the FINA Diving World Series, in Beijing, Daley conceded that the new dive still needed "work to be done" on it, as he failed to qualify for the final round. Overall, throughout the years' DWS meets, in the 10 m platform competition Daley won the silver medal in the Dubai, Windsor, Ontario, and Mérida, Mexico legs, and gold in London, whilst with Alicia Blagg he won bronze in the mixed synchronized 3m springboard at Windsor and at Mérida.

At the World Championships held in Kazan, Russia, Daley won the gold medal with Rebecca Gallantree in the inaugural team event competition (Daley diving twice from the 10 m platform and once from the 3 m springboard, Gallantree diving once from the platform and twice from the springboard). In the individual 10 m platform event he later won the bronze medal with 537.95 points, behind Qiu Bo on 587.00 and David Boudia on 560.20, having recovered from being in ninth place after the second round.

=== 2016 ===
For the 2016 season, Daley was paired with Daniel Goodfellow for the 10 m men's platform synchro competition, with a view to competing in the 2016 Rio Summer Olympics in this sport.

At the British National Diving Cup, the British Championships, held in January, Daley won a gold in the individual 10 m platform competition with 545.80 points, ahead of Matty Lee on 461.00 and Dan Goodfellow on 419.35 points. In the synchronized 10 m platform competition, Daley and Goodfellow won the competition, but they were the only entrants in the competition after Lee and James Denny withdrew following a power cut at the venue.

Daley and Goodfellow got bronze at the 2016 FINA Diving World Cup, earning them a spot in the 10 m synchro competition at the Olympic Games. At the 2016 FINA Diving World Series, which consisted of four competitions, Daley earned six medals. In the synchro event, he and Goodfellow medalled at each of the four competitions, earning two silver and two bronze medals. In the individual event, Daley earned a silver and a bronze medal.

At the 2016 Summer Olympics, Daley and Goodfellow won a bronze medal in the synchronized 10 m platform. In the individual 10 m platform, Daley placed first in the preliminaries (with an Olympic record score of 571.85 points, which was later broken by Chen Aisen in the finals). However, he had difficulties the next day, placing 18th in the semi-finals and failing to qualify for the finals.

=== 2017 ===
In the 2017 FINA World Series, Daley took home 1 bronze medal in Beijing (10 m Platform), 3 bronze medals in Kazan (10 m Platform, 10 m Synchro, and 3 m Mixed), and one silver medal in Guangzhou (10 m Platform). On 22 July 2017, he won the gold medal in the 10 m platform event at the FINA World Championships held in Budapest.

=== 2018–2019 ===
In the 2018 FINA Diving World Series, Daley won 1 silver medal and 1 bronze medal in Beijing (3 m Mixed and 10 m Synchro), 1 silver medal in Fuji (3 m Mixed), 1 silver medal in Montreal (3 m Mixed), and 1 silver medal in Kazan (3 m Mixed).

At the 2018 Commonwealth Games held at the Gold Coast, Australia, Daley and Goodfellow won gold on the men's synchronized 10-metre platform.

Daley partnered with Matty Lee starting in October 2018 in the men's synchronized 10-metre platform. At the 2019 World Aquatics Championships held in Gwangju, South Korea, Daley and Lee finished in the bronze position in the 10 m synchro.

=== 2021 ===
At the 2021 FINA Diving World Cup, which was held in Japan as an official test event for the 2020 Tokyo Olympics, (Note: postponed to 2021 due to the COVID-19 pandemic) Daley won his first World Cup gold with Matty Lee in synchronized 10 m platform. He also won gold in the individual 10 m platform. At the European Championships held in Budapest, Daley and Lee also won gold in synchronized 10 m platform, and a silver in the individual 10 m platform.

On 26 July, Daley and Lee won the 2020 Olympic gold medal in the Men's synchronized 10 m platform diving event.

On 7 August, Daley qualified for the final of Men's individual 10 m platform diving, improving on his performance in the individual event at Rio 2016. He went on to win bronze in the final.

=== 2024 ===
Daley was selected to take part in the 10 metre platform synchronised event at the 2024 Summer Olympics in Paris with Noah Williams; the pair went on to win the silver medal. He was also chosen to be one of Team GB's flag-bearers at the opening ceremony alongside rower Helen Glover. The day after the closing ceremony, Daley announced his official retirement from diving.

== Competitive history ==
- British champion in all events (1 m, 3 m, platform) in 2004, 2005 and 2006 in the relevant age group.

Competition	2005	2006	2007	2008	2009	2010	2011	2012	2013	2014	2015	2016	2017	2018	2019	2021	2024
Olympic Games
Olympic Games, 10 m				7th				3rd				18th^{**}				3rd	
Olympic Games, 10 m (synchro)				8th^{†}				4th^{@}				3rd^{=}				1st^{£}	2nd^{#}
World Championships
FINA World Championships, 10 m					1st		5th		6th		3rd		1st		7th		
FINA World Championships, 10 m (synchro)					9th^{§}		6th^{@}						4th^{=}		3rd^{£}		
FINA World Championships, 3 m mixed synchro													2nd^{♠}		4th^{♠}		
FINA World Championships, team event											1st^{&}						
European Championships
European Championships, 10 m				1st				1st		2nd		1st					
European Championships, 10 m (synchro)				6th^{†}						4th^{%}		2nd^{=}					
Commonwealth Games
Commonwealth Games, 10 m						1st				1st							
Commonwealth Games, 10 m (synchro)						1st^{§}				2nd^{%}				1st^{=}			
FINA/World Aquatics Diving World Series
FINA Diving World Series, Windsor, Ontario, Canada 10 m											2nd	3rd					
FINA Diving World Series, Windsor, Ontario, Canada mixed 3 m springboard											3rd^{*}	2nd^{=}					
FINA Diving World Series, Montreal, Quebec, Canada mixed 3 m springboard														2nd^{♠}	2nd^{♠}		
FINA Diving World Series, Montreal, Quebec, Canada, 10 m															1st		
FINA Diving World Series, Montreal, Quebec, Canada, 10 m synchro															2nd^{£}		
FINA Diving World Series, Changzhou, China, 10 m					3rd												
FINA Diving World Series, Nanjing, China, 10 m				4th													
FINA Diving World Series, Qingdao, China, 10 m						4th											
FINA Diving World Series, Beijing, China, 10 m							3rd^{@}	2nd		3rd		4th			4th		
FINA Diving World Series, Beijing, China, 10 m (synchro)								2nd^{@}				3rd^{=}		3rd^{=}			
FINA Diving World Series, Beijing, China, 3 m mixed synchro														2nd^{♠}	3rd^{♠}		
FINA Diving World Series, Sagamihara, Japan, 10 m															2nd		
FINA Diving World Series, Sagamihara, Japan, 10 m (synchro)															4th^{£}		
FINA Diving World Series, Sagamihara, Japan, 3 m mixed synchro															3rd^{♠}		
FINA Diving World Series, Fuji, Japan, mixed 3 m springboard														2nd^{♠}			
FINA Diving World Series, Tijuana, Mexico, 10 m				5th				1st									
FINA Diving World Series, Tijuana, Mexico, 10 m (synchro)				5th^{†}				3rd^{@}									
FINA Diving World Series, Veracruz, Mexico, 10 m						4th											
FINA Diving World Series, Guanajuato, Mexico, 10 m							2nd										
FINA Diving World Series, Guanajuato, Mexico, 10 m (synchro)							4th^{@}										
FINA Diving World Series, Mérida, Mexico 10 m											2nd						
FINA Diving World Series, Mérida, Mexico mixed 3 m springboard											3rd^{*}						
FINA Diving World Series, Doha, Qatar, 10 m					6th												
FINA Diving World Series, Moscow, Russia, 10 m							5th	2nd									
FINA Diving World Series, Moscow, Russia, 10 m (synchro)								5th^{@}									
FINA Diving World Series, Kazan, Russia, 10 m												2nd			3rd		
FINA Diving World Series, Kazan, Russia, 10 m (synchro)												3rd^{=}	3rd^{=}		3rd^{£}		
FINA Diving World Series, Kazan, Russia, mixed 3 m springboard														2nd^{♠}	3rd^{♠}		
FINA Diving World Series, Dubai, UAE, 10 m								2nd		4th	2nd	7th					
FINA Diving World Series, Dubai, UAE, 10 m (synchro)								4th^{@}				2nd^{=}					
FINA Diving World Series, London, UK 10 m										5th	1st				3rd		
FINA Diving World Series, London, UK 10 m (synchro)															1st^{£}		
FINA Diving World Series, London, UK mixed 3 m springboard															1st^{♠}		
FINA Diving World Series, Edinburgh, UK, 10 m									1st								
FINA Diving World Series, Sheffield, UK, 10 m			4th	2nd	2nd		4th										
FINA Diving World Series, Sheffield, UK, 10 m (synchro)			5th^{†}	1st^{†}	5th^{§}		1st^{@}										
FINA Diving Grand Prix, Fort Lauderdale, USA, 10 m					1st												
FINA Diving Grand Prix, Fort Lauderdale, USA, 10 m (synchro)					2nd^{§}												
FINA Diving Grand Prix, Madrid, 10 m			4th														
FINA Diving Grand Prix, Canada, 10 m			10th														
National Championships
British Championships, 10 m		3rd	2nd	1st	1st	2nd	2nd	1st	1st		1st	1st					
British Championships, 10 m (synchro)				1st^{†}			1st^{@}	1st^{@}				1st^{=}					
British Championships, 10 m (Junior)	1st	1st	1st					1st									
British Championships, 3 m							2nd										
British Championships, 3 m (Junior)		4th															
British Championships, 1 m		17th															
ASA National Championships, 10 m			1st														
ASA National Championships, 10 m (synchro)			1st														
ASA National Championships, 10 m (Junior)		2nd	1st														
ASA National Championships, 3 m (Junior)	1st	1st	1st														
ASA National Championships, 3 m			2nd				5th										
Junior championships
Summer Youth Olympics, 3 m						9th											
FINA Junior Diving World Championships, 3 m synchro ("A")									1st^{?}								
FINA Junior Diving World Championships, 3 m ("B")				2nd													
FINA Junior Diving World Championships, Boys 10 m Platform				2nd				1st									
ASA Elite Junior National Championships, 1 m		1st															
ASA Elite Junior National Championships, 3 m		1st															
ASA Elite Junior National Championships, 10 m		1st															
CAMO Invitational Meet, 10 m			6th														
CAMO Invitational Meet, 10 m (synchro)			1st^{†}														
Australian Junior Elite Diving Championships, 10 m	1st																
Australian Junior Elite Diving Championships, 3 m	2nd																
Aachen Junior International, 10 m	2nd																
Aachen Junior International, 3 m	3rd																

^{†} with Blake Aldridge
^{§} with Max Brick
^{@} with Peter Waterfield
^{?} with Jack Laugher
^{%} with James Denny
^{&} with Rebecca Gallantree
^{*} with Alicia Blagg
^{=} with Daniel Goodfellow
^{♠} with Grace Reid
^{£} with Matty Lee
^{#} with Noah Williams
^{**} semi-final result

Daley's current dives are:

1. 307C: Reverse 3 1/2 Somersault Tucked (3.4 Tariff)
2. 407C: Inward 3 1/2 Somersault Tucked (3.2 Tariff)
3. 5172B: Forward 3 1/2 Somersault w/ 1 Twist Piked (3.6 Tariff)
4. 626B: Armstand Back Triple Somersault Piked (3.5 Tariff)
5. 109C: Forward 4 1/2 Somersault Tucked (3.7 Tariff)
6. 207B: Back 3 1/2 Somersault Piked (3.6 Tariff)

== Media activities ==
In October 2017, Daley hosted the Virgin Holidays Attitude Awards for the first time.

On 30 September 2018, he was the guest on BBC Radio 4's Desert Island Discs. His favourite choice was "How Long Will I Love You" by Ellie Goulding. His book choice was Harry Potter and the Philosopher's Stone by J. K. Rowling and his luxury item was an oven.

On 25 December 2021, he delivered the Alternative Christmas message for Channel 4.

Since 2023, Daley has been one of several British Olympians and Paralympians to feature in adverts for British Gas.

In July 2024, it was announced that Daley would join Eurosport as part of its on-screen team of pundits for its coverage at the Paris Olympics. In August of the same year, Daley partnered with Malibu and the Royal Life Saving Society UK (RLSS UK) as part of their "Drink Don't Dive" campaign, with Daley creating and modelling a range of knitted swim briefs, sunglasses, a bucket hat and sliders to raise funds for RLSS UK, and raise awareness of the dangers of swimming after drinking. Malibu and RLSS UK repeated their partnership with Daley at Christmas 2024, with Daley designing a knitted Christmas jumper reading "Drink Don't Drive" to raise awareness of the dangers of drink-driving.

In May 2025, Daley was announced as a contestant on the first series of The Celebrity Traitors. He competed as a faithful but was ultimately the second player to be "murdered" in episode 3.

In June 2025, the documentary Tom Daley: 1.6 seconds, directed by Vaughan Sivell, was released, exploring Daley's life and career. The 90-minute programme, a collaboration between Warner Bros. Discovery and the Olympic Channel, premiered on HBO Max on 1 June, after a world premiere in Lyon, France, and was subsequently broadcast on Eurosport on 23 June. The documentary explores his journey from his first Olympics in 2008 to his final appearance in Paris 2024, delving into his personal challenges and featuring interviews with his family and coaches.

In November 2025, Daley started presenting Game of Wool: Britain's Best Knitter, a Channel 4 craft competition about knitting and crochet. In October 2025, Daley launched the "Made With Love By Tom Daley" range with Hobbycraft of knitting and crocheting craft kits. In November 2026, Daley added a series of coloured yarns to the range.

== Activism ==
In August 2014, Daley was one of 200 public figures who were signatories to a letter to The Guardian expressing their hope that Scotland would vote to remain part of the United Kingdom in the run-up to September's referendum on that issue.

In 2015, Daley became a patron of the LGBT+ charity Switchboard and collaborated with YouTuber Calum McSwiggan to relaunch the charity under its new name.

In a statement made on the eve of the Commonwealth Heads of Government Meeting 2018, Daley called on Commonwealth countries to repeal their anti-gay laws. In response, the-then UK Foreign Secretary Boris Johnson told BBC Radio 1's Newsbeat that he would raise concerns about gay rights with leaders of countries where homosexuality is illegal. There have been repeated calls from the Office of the United Nations High Commissioner for Human Rights for governments to safeguard the rights of their vulnerable LGBT minorities.

In October 2021, Daley said he would make it his "mission" to campaign for countries where homosexuality is punishable by death to be banned from the next Olympics.

== Personal life ==
Daley created a YouTube channel on 23 August 2010. His channel covers various topics such as vlogs, exercise and food. As of August 2024, Daley has over 1.2 million subscribers with over 180 million views.

On 2 December 2013, Daley released a YouTube video announcing that he had been in a relationship with a man since early that year. He said: "I've never been happier." Daley said that it had been a tough decision to speak out about his private life, but he had never before felt that feeling of love, which happened very quickly when he met his husband, American film screenwriter, director and producer Dustin Lance Black. Daley and Black met at an industry event, with Daley later saying that it was "a real love-at-first-sight thing". He announced their engagement on 1 October 2015. Daley and Black married at Bovey Castle in Devon on 6 May 2017. Their first child, a son, was born through surrogacy in June 2018. The couple's second son was born in March 2023. The couple moved from London to Los Angeles in 2024.

When asked about his sexual orientation in a July 2015 interview with The Guardian, Daley said: "I don't put a particular label on any of it because right now I'm in a relationship with a guy, but I still have sexual feelings towards girls". He said in another interview that he had been in sexual relationships with girls, but his sexual feelings became "much more intense" when he met Black. In July 2021, Daley referred to himself as a "gay man".

Daley likes to knit and crochet, hobbies he took up when the COVID-19 pandemic lockdown began. During the 2020 and 2024 Summer Olympics television coverage of diving events, Daley was frequently shown knitting in the stands while he watched other athletes compete. He maintains a separate Instagram account dedicated to his knitting and crochet projects. In November 2024, an exhibition of his knitting work in Japan was announced, which would be part of his campaign for the rights of LGBTQ+ people.

== Honours and awards ==
Daley was appointed Officer of the Order of the British Empire (OBE) in the 2022 New Year Honours for services to diving, LGBTQ+ rights and charity.

- Named Youngster of the Year by BBC South West in 2005.
- Named BBC South West Sports Personality of the Year, 2009.
- Short-listed to the final ten for the BBC Young Sports Personality of the Year award in 2006.
- Short-listed to the final three for the BBC Young Sports Personality of the Year award in 2008.
- Named BBC Young Sports Personality of the Year 2007, 2009 and 2010 (only person ever to win this award more than once).
- Short-listed to the final ten for the BBC Sports Personality of the Year Award in 2009 and 2010.
- Ranked No. 63 in Time's 2008 edition of 100 Olympic Athletes To Watch.
- Won LEN Magazine's "Athlete of the Year" award for men's divers, 2009, on behalf of the European Swimming Federation. The award is voted for by representatives of all European Aquatic Federations and the media.
- Nominated for the 2010 Laureus World Sports Award for Breakthrough of the Year.
- Included in The Sunday Times' "100 Makers of the 21st Century" list.
- He was awarded an Honorary Doctorate on 27 September 2017 by the University of St Mark and St John in Plymouth, Devon.
- He was awarded the Honorary Freedom of the City of Plymouth, Devon by the Plymouth City Council on 13 September 2021.
- For the 2020 Summer Olympics, FINA named Daley winning the gold medal in the synchronized 10 metre platform event with his diving partner Matty Lee as the number three moment from the Olympic Games.
- A 2024 YouGov survey asked young LGBTQ+ Britons (16–25) which public figures made a "positive impression" on them growing up in terms of making them feel more comfortable and less alone in their identities. Though the list was "long and widely varied", Daley came third.

Year	Award-giving body	Category	Result
2006	BBC Sports Personality of the Year	BBC Young Sports Personality of the Year	Nominated
2007	BBC Sports Personality of the Year	BBC Young Sports Personality of the Year	Won
2007	The Herald Awards	Sports Personality of the Year	Won
2008	BBC Sports Personality of the Year	BBC Young Sports Personality of the Year	Nominated
2009	BBC Sports Personality of the Year	BBC Sports Personality of the Year	Nominated
2009	BBC Sports Personality of the Year	BBC Young Sports Personality of the Year	Won
2009	The Daily Telegraph/Aviva School Sport Matters Awards	Student of the Year (Male)	Won
2009	The Herald Awards	Sports Personality of the Year	Won
2010	BBC Radio 1's Teen Awards	Best Sports Star	Won
2010	BBC Sports Personality of the Year	BBC Sports Personality of the Year	Nominated
2010	BBC Sports Personality of the Year	BBC Young Sports Personality of the Year	Won
2010	Laureus World Sports Awards	Breakthrough of the Year	Nominated
2011	BBC Radio 1's Teen Awards	Best Young Sports Star	Won
2012	BBC Radio 1's Teen Awards	Best British Sports Star	Won
2012	BBC Radio 1's Teen Awards	Male Hottie of the Year	Won
2012	The Herald Awards	Sports Personality of the Year	Won
2013	Nickelodeon UK Kids' Choice Awards	Favourite UK Sports Star	Won
2014	Attitude Awards	Man of the Year	Won
2017	British LGBT Awards	Independent Influencer Award (with Dustin Lance Black)	Won

== Notes ==
Olympic Games
Preceded by Hannah Mills; Moe Sbihi	Flagbearer for United Kingdom (with Helen Glover); París 2024	Succeeded by Incumbent
