= Diving at the 2016 European Aquatics Championships – Men's 10 m platform =

Men's 10 m platform at the 2016 European Aquatics Championships
- Dates: 15 May
- Competitors: 16 from 10 nations
- Winning points: 570.50

Medalists
| gold medal | Tom Daley | Great Britain |
| silver medal | Viktor Minibaev | Russia |
| bronze medal | Nikita Shleikher | Russia |

The Men's 10 m platform competition of the 2016 European Aquatics Championships was held on 15 May 2016.

== Results ==
The preliminary round was held at 10:00. The final was held at 15:30.

Green denotes finalists

| Rank | Diver | Nationality | Preliminary | | Final | |
| Rank | Diver | Nationality | Points | Rank | Points | Rank |
|---|---|---|---|---|---|---|
| 1st place, gold medalist(s) | Tom Daley | Great Britain | 500.65 | 1 | 570.50 | 1 |
| 2nd place, silver medalist(s) | Viktor Minibaev | Russia | 463.75 | 2 | 524.60 | 2 |
| 3rd place, bronze medalist(s) | Nikita Shleikher | Russia | 423.20 | 5 | 480.90 | 3 |
| 4 | Sascha Klein | Germany | 457.65 | 3 | 478.10 | 4 |
| 5 | Matty Lee | Great Britain | 398.75 | 6 | 465.10 | 5 |
| 6 | Timo Barthel | Germany | 376.15 | 8 | 464.10 | 6 |
| 7 | Lev Sargsyan | Armenia | 367.05 | 9 | 432.75 | 7 |
| 8 | Maksym Dolhov | Ukraine | 449.35 | 4 | 428.15 | 8 |
| 9 | Maicol Verzotto | Italy | 354.30 | 12 | 424.05 | 9 |
| 10 | Vadim Kaptur | Belarus | 378.15 | 7 | 414.65 | 10 |
| 11 | Jesper Tolvers | Sweden | 367.05 | 9 | 399.95 | 11 |
| 12 | Alexis Jandard | France | 364.65 | 11 | 380.15 | 12 |
| 13 | Loïs Szymczak | France | 345.80 | 13 | | |
| 14 | Heikki Makikallio | Finland | 341.90 | 14 | | |
| 15 | Vladimir Barbu | Italy | 334.00 | 15 | | |
| 16 | Yauheni Karaliou | Belarus | 325.25 | 16 | | |
