= 2017 FINA Diving World Series =

International diving competition series

The 2017 FINA Diving World Series, also known as FINA/NVC Diving World Series, is the ninth edition of FINA Diving World Series. The 1st leg is Beijing, China and followed by, 2nd leg Guangzhou, China. The 3rd leg is in Kazan, Russia and the final leg in Windsor, Canada. A total of 68 divers (31 men and 37 women) competed.

== Overall medal tally ==
Rank	Nation	Gold	Silver	Bronze	Total
1	China (CHN)	37	13	6	56
2	Great Britain (GBR)	2	5	6	13
3	Russia (RUS)	1	3	9	13
4	Canada (CAN)	0	6	4	10
5	Australia (AUS)	0	4	10	14
6	Germany (GER)	0	4	0	4
7	Malaysia (MAS)	0	2	1	3
7	Mexico (MEX)	0	2	1	3
9	North Korea (PRK)	0	1	3	4
Totals (9 entries)		40	40	40	120

== Beijing leg ==
The first leg took place between 3 and 5 March 2017.

=== Medal table ===
Rank	Nation	Gold	Silver	Bronze	Total
1	China (CHN)	9	4	1	14
2	Great Britain (GBR)	1	1	1	3
3	Australia (AUS)	0	2	1	3
4	Russia (RUS)	0	1	3	4
5	Germany (GER)	0	1	0	1
5	Malaysia (MAS)	0	1	0	1
7	Canada (CAN)	0	0	2	2
7	North Korea (PRK)	0	0	2	2
Totals (8 entries)		10	10	10	30

=== Medal summary ===
==== Men ====
Event	Gold	Silver	Bronze
3 metre springboard	Jack Laugher (GBR)	Xie Siyi (CHN)	Cao Yuan (CHN)
10 metre platform	Chen Aisen (CHN)	Yang Hao (CHN)	Tom Daley (GBR)
Synchronized; 3 metre springboard	Cao Yuan (CHN); Xie Siyi (CHN)	Jack Laugher (GBR); Chris Mears (GBR)	Evgeniy Kuznetsov (RUS); Ilia Zakharov (RUS)
Synchronized; 10 metre platform	Chen Aisen (CHN); Yang Hao (CHN)	Patrick Hausding (GER); Sascha Klein (GER)	Aleksandr Bondar (RUS); Viktor Minibaev (RUS)

==== Women ====
Event	Gold	Silver	Bronze
3 metre springboard	Shi Tingmao (CHN)	Chang Yani (CHN)	Maddison Keeney (AUS)
10 metre platform	Si Yajie (CHN)	Ren Qian (CHN)	Kim Mi-rae (PRK)
Synchronized; 3 metre springboard	Shi Tingmao (CHN); Xu Zhihuan (CHN)	Maddison Keeney (AUS); Anabelle Smith (AUS)	Kristina Ilinykh (RUS); Nadezhda Bazhina (RUS)
Synchronized; 10 metre platform	Chang Yani (CHN); Ren Qian (CHN)	Cheong Jun Hoong (MAS); Pamg Pandelela Rinong (MAS)	Kim Mi-rae (PRK); Kim Kuk-hyang (PRK)

==== Mixed ====
Event	Gold	Silver	Bronze
3 metre springboard	Wang Han (CHN); Li Zheng (CHN)	Domonic Bedggood (AUS); Maddison Keeney (AUS)	François Imbeau-Dulac (CAN); Jennifer Abel (CAN)
10 metre platform	Lian Jie (CHN); Lian Junjie (CHN)	Iuliia Timoshinina (RUS); Viktor Minibaev (RUS)	Vincent Riendeau (CAN); Meaghan Benfeito (CAN)

== Guangzhou leg ==
The second leg took place between 9 and 11 March 2017.

=== Medal table ===
Rank	Nation	Gold	Silver	Bronze	Total
1	China (CHN)	10	2	2	14
2	Great Britain (GBR)	0	3	0	3
3	Australia (AUS)	0	1	3	4
4	Canada (CAN)	0	1	1	2
4	North Korea (PRK)	0	1	1	2
6	Germany (GER)	0	1	0	1
6	Mexico (MEX)	0	1	0	1
8	Russia (RUS)	0	0	2	2
9	Malaysia (MAS)	0	0	1	1
Totals (9 entries)		10	10	10	30

=== Medal summary ===
==== Men ====
Event	Gold	Silver	Bronze
3 metre springboard	Xie Siyi (CHN)	Jack Laugher (GBR)	Cao Yuan (CHN)
10 metre platform	Chen Aisen (CHN)	Tom Daley (GBR)	Yang Hao (CHN)
Synchronized; 3 metre springboard	Cao Yuan (CHN); Xie Siyi (CHN)	Jack Laugher (GBR); Chris Mears (GBR)	Evgeniy Kuznetsov (RUS); Ilia Zakharov (RUS)
Synchronized; 10 metre platform	Chen Aisen (CHN); Yang Hao (CHN)	Patrick Hausding (GER); Sascha Klein (GER)	Aleksandr Bondar (RUS); Viktor Minibaev (RUS)

==== Women ====
Event	Gold	Silver	Bronze
3 metre springboard	Shi Tingmao (CHN)	Chang Yani (CHN)	Maddison Keeney (AUS)
10 metre platform	Si Yajie (CHN)	Ren Qian (CHN)	Kim Kuk-hyang (PRK)
Synchronized; 3 metre springboard	Shi Tingmao (CHN); Xu Zhihuan (CHN)	Maddison Keeney (AUS); Anabelle Smith (AUS)	Jennifer Abel (CAN); Melissa Citrini Beaulieu (CAN)
Synchronized; 10 metre platform	Chang Yani (CHN); Ren Qian (CHN)	Kim Mi-rae (PRK); Kim Kuk-hyang (PRK)	Cheong Jun Hoong (MAS); Pamg Pandelela Rinong (MAS)

==== Mixed ====
Event	Gold	Silver	Bronze
3 metre springboard	Wang Han (CHN); Li Zheng (CHN)	François Imbeau-Dulac (CAN); Jennifer Abel (CAN)	Domonic Bedggood (AUS); Maddison Keeney (AUS)
10 metre platform	Lian Jie (CHN); Lian Junjie (CHN)	Viviana del Angel Peniche (MEX); Randal Willars Valdez (MEX)	Taneka Kovchenkot (AUS); Domonic Bedggood (AUS)

== Kazan leg ==
The third leg took place between 31 March and 2 April 2017.

=== Medal table ===
Rank	Nation	Gold	Silver	Bronze	Total
1	China (CHN)	10	4	0	14
2	Russia (RUS)	0	2	3	5
3	Canada (CAN)	0	2	1	3
4	Great Britain (GBR)	0	1	3	4
5	Germany (GER)	0	1	0	1
6	Australia (AUS)	0	0	2	2
7	Mexico (MEX)	0	0	1	1
8	Malaysia (MAS)	0	0	0	0
8	North Korea (PRK)	0	0	0	0
Totals (9 entries)		10	10	10	30

=== Medal summary ===
==== Men ====
Event	Gold	Silver	Bronze
3 metre springboard	Cao Yuan (CHN)	Xie Siyi (CHN)	Ilia Zakharov (RUS)
10 metre platform	Chen Aisen (CHN)	Yang Hao (CHN)	Tom Daley (GBR)
Synchronized; 3 metre springboard	Cao Yuan (CHN); Xie Siyi (CHN)	Jack Laugher (GBR); Chris Mears (GBR)	Evgeni Kuznetsov (RUS); Ilia Zakharov (RUS)
Synchronized; 10 metre platform	Chen Aisen (CHN); Yang Hao (CHN)	Sascha Klein (GER); Patrick Hausding (GER)	Tom Daley (GBR); Daniel Goodfellow (GBR)

==== Women ====
Event	Gold	Silver	Bronze
3 metre springboard	Shi Tingmao (CHN)	Wang Han (CHN)	Jennifer Abel (CAN)
10 metre platform	Ren Qian (CHN)	Si Yajie (CHN)	Viviana del Angel Peniche (MEX)
Synchronized; 3 metre springboard	Chang Yani (CHN); Shi Tingmao (CHN)	Nadezhda Bazhina (RUS); Kristina Ilinykh (RUS)	Esther Qin (AUS); Maddison Keeney (AUS)
Synchronized; 10 metre platform	Ren Qian (CHN); Si Yajie (CHN)	Caeli McKay (CAN); Meaghan Benfeito (CAN)	Yulia Timoshinina (RUS); Valeriia Belova (RUS)

==== Mixed ====
Event	Gold	Silver	Bronze
3 metre springboard	Li Zheng (CHN); Wang Han (CHN)	Jennifer Abel (CAN); François Imbeau-Dulac (CAN)	Tom Daley (GBR); Grace Reid (GBR)
10 metre platform	Liang Jie (CHN); Lian Junjie (CHN)	Viktor Minibaev (RUS); Yulia Timoshinina (RUS)	Domonic Bedggood (AUS); Melissa Wu (AUS)

== Windsor leg ==
The final leg took place between 21 and 23 April 2017.

=== Medal summary ===
==== Men ====
Event	Gold	Silver	Bronze
3 metre springboard	Jack Laugher (GBR)	Xie Siyi (CHN)	Cao Yuan (CHN)
10 metre platform	Chen Aisen (CHN)	Yang Hao (CHN)	Tom Daley (GBR)
Synchronized; 3 metre springboard	Evgeni Kuznetsov (RUS); Ilia Zakharov (RUS)	Jahir Ocampo (MEX); Rommel Pacheco (MEX)	Cao Yuan (CHN); Xie Siyi (CHN)
Synchronized; 10 metre platform	Chen Aisen (CHN); Yang Hao (CHN)	Sascha Klein (GER); Patrick Hausding (GER)	Aleksandr Bondar (RUS); Viktor Minibaev (RUS)

==== Women ====
Event	Gold	Silver	Bronze
3 metre springboard	Shi Tingmao (CHN)	Wang Han (CHN)	Maddison Keeney (AUS)
10 metre platform	Si Yajie (CHN)	Melissa Wu (AUS)	Ren Qian (CHN)
Synchronized; 3 metre springboard	Chang Yani (CHN); Shi Tingmao (CHN)	Jennifer Abel (CAN); Melissa Citrini Beaulieu (CAN)	Esther Qin (AUS); Anabelle Smith (AUS)
Synchronized; 10 metre platform	Ren Qian (CHN); Si Yajie (CHN)	Nur Dhabitah Sabri (MAS); Pandelela Pamg (MAS)	Tonia Couch (GBR); Lois Toulson (GBR)

==== Mixed ====
Event	Gold	Silver	Bronze
3 metre springboard	Wang Han (CHN); Zheng Li (CHN)	Jennifer Abel (CAN); François Imbeau-Dulac (CAN)	Kevin Chávez (AUS); Maddison Keeney (AUS)
10 metre platform	Lian Jie (CHN); Lian Junjie (CHN)	Vincent Riendeau (CAN); Meaghan Benfeito (CAN)	Melissa Wu (AUS); Domonic Bedggood (AUS)
