= Chen Aisen =

Chinese diver (born 1995)

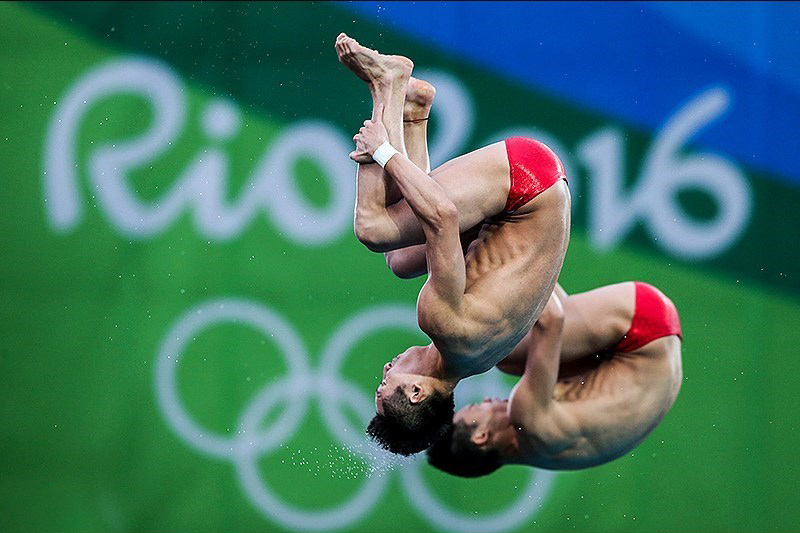
- Chen and Lin Yue at the 2016 Summer Olympics

Personal information
- Native name: 陈艾森
- Nationality: Chinese
- Born: 22 October 1995 (age 30) Guangzhou, China
- Height: 1.68 m (5 ft 6 in)
- Weight: 60 kg (132 lb)

Sport
- Country: China
- Sport: Diving
- Event(s): 10 m, 10 m synchro
- Club: Guangdong Province
Medal record
Men's diving
Representing China
Event	1st	2nd	3rd
Olympic Games	2	1	0
World Championships	3	1	0
FINA Diving World Cup	3	1	0
Total	8	3	0
Olympic Games
Gold medal – first place	2016 Rio de Janeiro	10 m platform
Gold medal – first place	2016 Rio de Janeiro	10 m synchro
Silver medal – second place	2020 Tokyo	10 m synchro
World Championships
Gold medal – first place	2015 Kazan	10 m synchro
Gold medal – first place	2017 Budapest	10 m synchro
Gold medal – first place	2019 Gwangju	10 m synchro
Silver medal – second place	2017 Budapest	10 m platform
FINA Diving World Cup
Gold medal – first place	2016 Rio de Janeiro	10 m synchro
Gold medal – first place	2018 Wuhan	10 m synchro
Gold medal – first place	2018 Wuhan	10 m platform
Silver medal – second place	2016 Rio de Janeiro	10 m platform

Chen Aisen (Chinese: 陈艾森; pinyin: Chén Àisēn, born 22 October 1995) is a Chinese diver. He is a double gold medal winner at the 2016 Summer Olympics. He won gold in the men's synchronised 10m platform competition with diving partner Lin Yue, as well as gold in the men's individual 10m platform. He has also won golds in the World Championships partnered with Yang Hao and Cao Yuan.

== Early life ==
Chen was born in Guangzhou, China. He started diving while he was at primary school, selected for his potential in diving. He studied at Jinan University in Guangzhou.

== Diving career ==
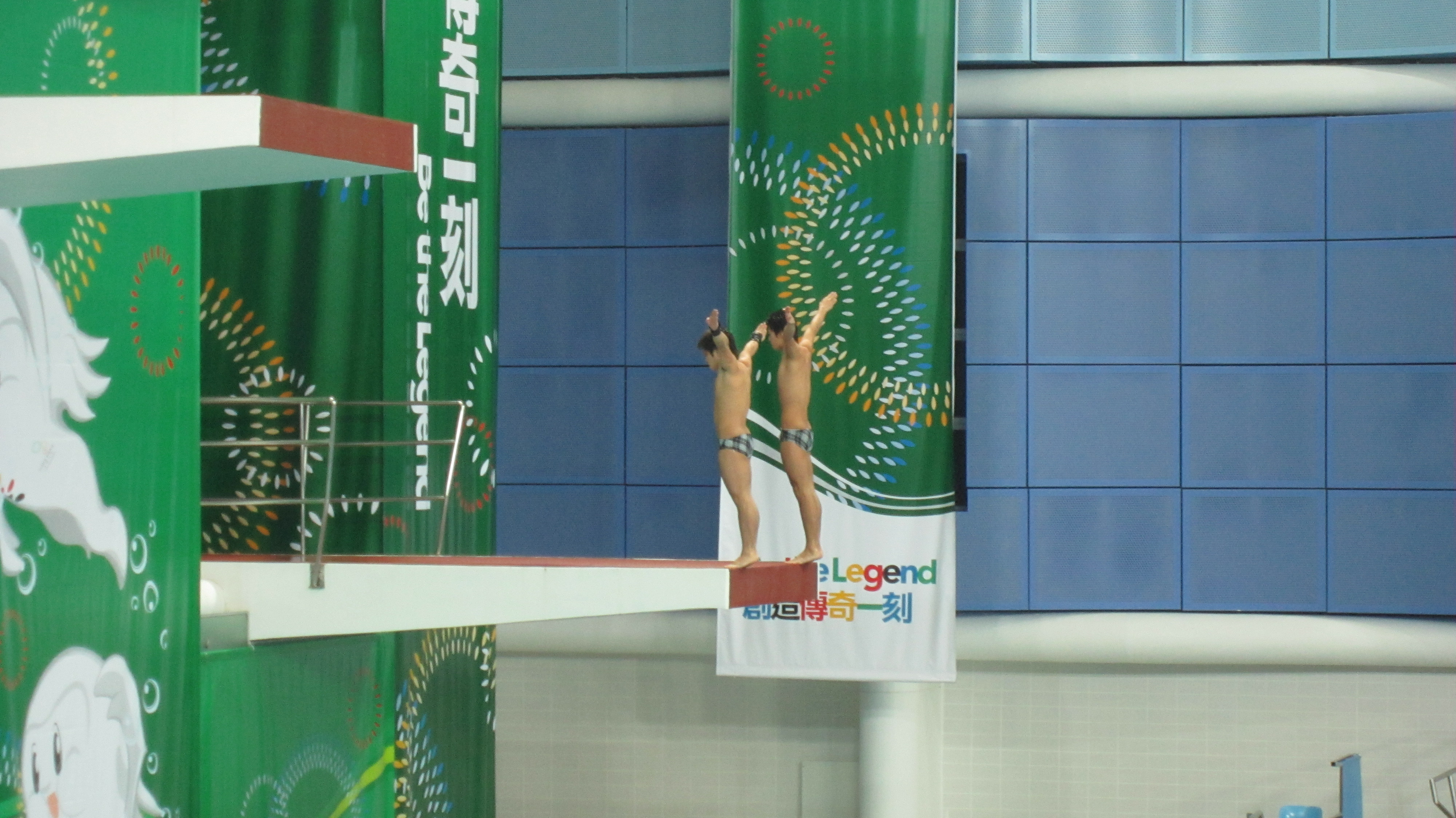
Chen Aisen and Zhang Yanquan at the 2009 East Asian Games

In 2009, Chen won a gold medal in the men's 10m synchronized event at the East Asian Games with his partner Zhang Yanquan. Chen was just 14. In the next several years, Chen competed in the FINA Diving Grand Prix competitions and won an assortment of medals. In 2014, Chen and Zhang won the 10m synchro event at the Asian Championships.

=== Olympic Games ===
At the 2016 Summer Olympics, Chen and Lin won the gold medal in the 10m synchro event with an overall score of 496.98. He also won the gold medal in the 10m platform event with a score of 585.30. His victory marks the first time China had won the Olympic gold in the men's 10m platform since the 2004 Summer Olympic Games in Athens. Later that year, FINA named Chen as the Male Diver of the Year.

At the 2020 Tokyo Olympics held in 2021, Chen, now paired with Cao Yuan, won silver in the Men's synchronised 10 m platform event behind Matty Lee and Tom Daley.

=== World Championships ===
In 2015, Chen was partnered with Lin when they won the 10m synchro event at the World Championships in Kazan. Their overall score was 495.72. In 2017, Chen won another gold medal in the 10m synchro event with his new partner, Yang Hao. He also received the silver medal in the individual 10m platform event, which was won by British diver Tom Daley.

At the 2019 World Aquatics Championships held in Gwangju, South Korea, Chen partnered with Cao Yuan in the 10m synchro and won gold.

=== World Cup ===
At the 2016 FINA Diving World Cup, Chen won the gold medal in the 10m synchro competition and the silver medal in the 10m platform competition.

=== World Series ===
During the 2013 FINA Diving World Series, Chen won three gold medals in the 10m synchro events with Lin in the Moscow, Dubai, and Beijing legs. He was also the silver medal winner in the individual events in Beijing and Dubai. In 2014, Chen teamed up with Yang Jian to win one gold medal and one silver medal in the 10m synchro event.

Chen was partnered with Lin in 2015. They won a total of five gold medals in the 10m synchro events. During the following year, the two of them won the 10m synchro competitions in all four legs. Chen also competed in the 10m platform events, where he won three gold medals and one silver medal. He achieved a higher score than fellow Chinese diver Qiu Bo in three of the legs.

In 2017, Chen won multiple gold medals in the 10m platform and 10m synchro events. In the Guangzhou leg, Chen achieved an overall score of 601.15, which made him the fifth diver in history to collect over 600 points on the platform after Lin, Qiu, Yang, and Cao Yuan.

== Competitive history ==
2013
Competition	Event	Score	Rank
FINA Diving World Series – Beijing	Men 10m platform final	551.55	2nd
FINA Diving World Series – Beijing	Men 10m synchro final	493.47	1st
FINA Diving World Series – Dubai	Men 10m platform final	571.60	2nd
FINA Diving World Series – Dubai	Men 10m synchro final	490.95	1st
FINA Diving World Series – Moscow	Men 10m platform final	514.25	3rd
FINA Diving World Series – Moscow	Men 10m synchro final	471.18	1st

2014
Competition	Event	Score	Rank
FINA Diving World Series – London	Men 10m platform final	553.25	2nd
FINA Diving World Series – London	Men 10m synchro final	479.13	1st
FINA Diving World Series – Moscow	Men 10m platform final	563.30	1st
FINA Diving World Series – Moscow	Men 10m synchro final	444.66	2nd

2015
Competition	Event	Score	Rank
FINA Diving World Series – Beijing	Men 10m synchro final	486.75	1st
FINA Diving World Series – Beijing	Mixed 10m synchro final	330.00	1st
FINA Diving World Series – Dubai	Men 10m synchro final	484.23	1st
FINA Diving World Series – Dubai	Mixed 10m synchro final	338.40	1st
FINA Diving World Series – Kazan	Men 10m synchro final	462.78	1st
FINA Diving World Series – London	Men 10m synchro final	474.84	1st
16th World Aquatics Championships	Men 10m synchro final	495.72	1st

2016
Competition	Event	Score	Rank
20th FINA Diving World Cup	Men 10m platform final	534.25	2nd
20th FINA Diving World Cup	Men 10m synchro final	456.00	1st
FINA Diving World Series – Beijing	Men 10m platform final	572.40	1st
FINA Diving World Series – Beijing	Men 10m synchro final	477.15	1st
FINA Diving World Series – Dubai	Men 10m platform final	569.15	2nd
FINA Diving World Series – Dubai	Men 10m synchro final	466.50	1st
FINA Diving World Series – Windsor	Men 10m platform final	590.15	1st
FINA Diving World Series – Windsor	Men 10m synchro final	482.01	1st
FINA Diving World Series – Kazan	Men 10m platform final	572.40	1st
FINA Diving World Series – Kazan	Men 10m synchro final	485.67	1st
2016 Summer Olympics	Men 10m platform final	585.30	1st
2016 Summer Olympics	Men 10m synchro final	496.98	1st

2017
Competition	Event	Score	Rank
FINA Diving World Series – Beijing	Men 10m platform final	556.25	1st
FINA Diving World Series – Beijing	Men 10m synchro final	488.85	1st
FINA Diving World Series – Guangzhou	Men 10m platform final	601.15	1st
FINA Diving World Series – Guangzhou	Men 10m synchro final	463.71	1st
FINA Diving World Series – Kazan	Men 10m platform final	580.60	1st
FINA Diving World Series – Kazan	Men 10m synchro final	462.57	1st
FINA Diving World Series – Windsor	Men 10m platform final	569.10	1st
FINA Diving World Series – Windsor	Men 10m synchro final	477.84	1st
17th World Aquatics Championships	Men 10m platform final	585.25	2nd
17th World Aquatics Championships	Men 10m synchro final	498.48	1st
