= Diving at the 2024 Summer Olympics – Men's synchronized 10 metre platform =

Men's synchronized 10 metre platform at the Games of the XXXIII Olympiad
- Venue: Paris Aquatics Centre
- Date: 29 July 2024
- Competitors: 16 from 8 nations
- Winning total: 490.35

Medalists
1st place, gold medalist(s)		Yang Hao; Lian Junjie	China
2nd place, silver medalist(s)		Tom Daley; Noah Williams	Great Britain
3rd place, bronze medalist(s)		Rylan Wiens; Nathan Zsombor-Murray	Canada

The men's 10 metre synchronised platform diving competitions at the 2024 Summer Olympics in Paris is scheduled to run on 29 July 2024 at the Paris Aquatics Centre. It will be the 7th appearance of the event, which has been held at every Olympic Games since the 2000 Summer Olympics.

== Competition format ==
The competition was held in a single round, consisting of each pair performing six dives. Each dive was from a different group (forward, back, reverse, inward, and twisting). The first two dives were given a fixed degree of difficulty of 2.0, regardless of the dive performed. The other four dives were assigned a degree of difficulty based on somersaults, position, twists, approach, and entry. There was no limit to the degree of difficulty of dives; the most difficult dives calculated in the FINA rulebook (reverse 4 1/2 somersault in pike position and back 4 1/2 somersault in pike position) was 4.7, but competitors could attempt more difficult dives. Scoring was done by a panel of eleven judges, with five judges evaluating synchronization and three judges evaluating execution of each individual diver. For each dive, each judge gave a score between 0 and 10 with 0.5 point increments. The top and bottom synchronization scores and the top and bottom execution scores for each diver were discarded. The remaining five scores were summed, multiplied by 3/5, and multiplied by the degree of difficulty to give a dive score. The six dive scores were summed to give the score for the round.

== Schedule ==
All times are Central European time (UTC+1)

Date	Time	Round
29 July 2024	11:00	Final

== Qualification ==
The top 3 teams at the 2023 World Aquatics Championships earned a quota spot for their NOC. France as the host country, was guaranteed a quota spot. The next 4 teams at the 2024 World Aquatics Championships also received a quota spot.

The field is led by the reigning World champions, Yang Hao and Lian Junjie of China. Reigning Olympic champion Tom Daley of Great Britain returns to defend his title with new partner, Noah Williams, while the field includes former world champion in the individual event Cassiel Rousseau of Australia.

== Results ==
Rank	Divers	Nation	Final						
Rank	Divers	Nation	Dive 1	Dive 2	Dive 3	Dive 4	Dive 5	Dive 6	Points
1st place, gold medalist(s)	Yang Hao; Lian Junjie	China	56.40	57.60	85.44	95.88	91.80	103.23	490.35
2nd place, silver medalist(s)	Tom Daley; Noah Williams	Great Britain	53.40	51.60	83.52	93.96	87.72	93.24	463.44
3rd place, bronze medalist(s)	Rylan Wiens; Nathan Zsombor-Murray	Canada	53.40	51.60	78.72	83.52	75.48	79.68	422.13
4	Randal Willars; Kevin Berlín	Mexico	50.40	48.00	81.60	74.52	78.81	85.32	418.65
5	Kirill Boliukh; Oleksiy Sereda	Ukraine	48.60	48.60	76.80	76.80	74.37	87.48	412.65
6	Cassiel Rousseau; Domonic Bedggood	Australia	51.00	48.60	76.80	72.96	64.38	81.00	394.74
7	Timo Barthel; Jaden Eikermann Gregorchuk	Germany	49.80	47.40	74.88	66.33	61.20	64.80	364.41
8	Gary Hunt; Loïs Szymczak	France	48.00	45.00	62.10	39.60	65.28	54.60	314.58
