= Tom Daley Goes Global =

- Title card
- Genre: Documentary, Travel
- Directed by: Colin May
- Starring: Tom Daley; Sophie Lee
- Narrated by: James Corden
- Composer: Adage Music
- Country of origin: United Kingdom
- Original language: English
- No. of series: 1
- No. of episodes: 6

Production
- Executive producers: Richard Foster; Melaine Darlaston
- Producers: Colin May; Mike Spencer
- Production locations: Thailand; Japan; New Zealand; Australia; Spain; France; Switzerland; Morocco
- Running time: 60 minutes (including adverts)
- Production companies: Twofour and Motion Content Group

Original release
- Network: ITV2 & ITV2 HD
- Release: 10 April – 15 May 2014

Tom Daley Goes Global (previously titled Tom Daley Takes on the World) is a British television documentary show shown on ITV2 which began airing on 10 April 2014. The show follows Olympic bronze medal winner Tom Daley and his best friend Sophie Lee backpack around the world for six weeks to get life-changing experiences, whilst in each country Daley will try some extreme sports such as bungee jumping and flying a jet-plane to raise money for a brain tumour charity.

== Episodes ==
No.	Place visited	Original release date
1	Thailand	10 April 2014
Tom and Sophie visit various places in Thailand and Tom skydives from a plane.
2	Japan	17 April 2014
Tom and Sophie visit various places in Japan, Tom sings karaoke and paraglides off a mountain.
3	New Zealand	24 April 2014
Tom and Sophie go on a campervan journey to visit the South Island of New Zealand and Tom bungee jumps of a mountain.
4	Australia	1 May 2014
Tom and Sophie visit The Great Barrier Reef and The X Factor studios. They also meet Dannii Minogue and Ronan Keating, also Tom flies a fighter jet airplane.
5	Europe	8 May 2014
Tom and Sophie travel to Spain, France and Switzerland, meets Mollie King from girl group The Saturdays. Tom bungee jump off the Verzasca Dam in the Swiss Alps.
6	Morocco	15 May 2014
Tom and Sophie conclude their trip around the world in Morocco, where they spend the night in the Sahara desert. They climb the Todra Gorge and abseil down the gorge to end the journey.

== Reception ==
Catriona Wightman of Digital Spy described the show as not particularly enjoyable and having little depth, writing that "it all feels like a home movie" which "doesn't necessarily make for compelling television". Rhik Samadder of The Guardian called it "duller than the back of a scuffed spoon", arguing that the "sight of vague celebrities going on holiday does not make great television".
