= Plymouth Life Centre =

Sports centre in Plymouth, England

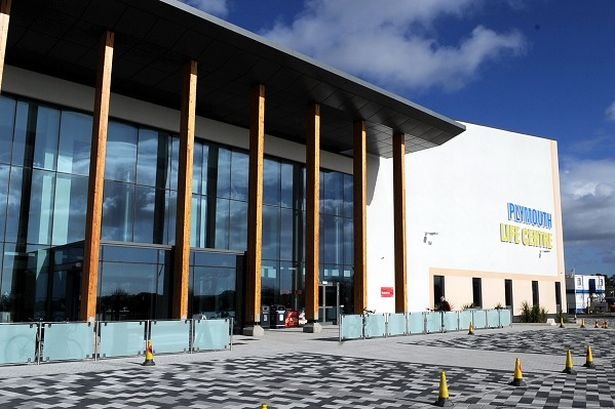
Plymouth Life Centre

The Plymouth Life Centre is an indoor sports complex and leisure centre in Central Park, Plymouth, Devon, England, run by Plymouth Active Leisure (previously Everyone Active) in partnership with Plymouth City Council. Its facilities include a family leisure pool, a climbing wall, an eight-lane indoor bowls centre, fitness suite, a 10 lane 50-metre Olympic standard swimming pool, an Olympic standard diving pool, along with dryside training facilities, showers and a multipurpose area for dance and martial arts. It is currently the only 12 court multipurpose sports hall in Devon. The climbing wall facility is managed by High Sports. The aquatic facilities are the largest facility in southern England and were used by several teams training for the 2012 Olympics. The Life Centre replaces the Mayflower Centre and Central Park Leisure Pools. It opened in March 2012 at a cost of £46.5m.

Following the announcement that gyms and leisure centres could open on 25 July 2020, after the UK's first national lockdown amidst the COVID-19 pandemic, Plymouth City Council announced that following investigations by themselves and the contractors, Balfour Beatty, urgent repair work needed to be done to the building. This would include stripping the pool and changing rooms back to the base concrete and laying new waterproof layers. The Life Centre subsequently closed and would do so until April 2021 whilst work was undertaken. Due to the UK Government's road map out of the country's third lockdown, the Life Centre would not reopen to the public until 17 May 2021.

== Clubs ==
The centre is home to the Plymouth Raiders national league basketball team, Plymouth Life Centre Indoor Bowls Club, and to Plymouth Diving Club.

== Sporting records ==
Ben Proud broke the British 50m freestyle record at Plymouth Life Centre in May 2014.

The Life Centre hosted the 2015 British Diving Championships, where local diver World Champion and Olympian Tom Daley won the British title on the 10m platform.

== Architecture ==
Work commenced on the building in February, 2010 and was completed in September, 2011. The main contractor for the building was Balfour Beatty.

The building features glass cladding using tiles with stainless steel staircases. Low-carbon technologies were used to heat the building and Plymouth's largest rooftop solar PV was installed to reduce energy bills.

In 2013, the centre won the Quality Awards' 'Best Community Building'
