= Diving at the 2020 European Aquatics Championships – Men's 10 m platform =

Men's 10 m platform at the 2020 European Aquatics Championships
- Venue: Danube Arena
- Dates: 16 May 2021
- Competitors: 22 from 14 nations
- Winning points: 564.35

Medalists
gold medal	Aleksandr Bondar	Russia
silver medal	Tom Daley	Great Britain
bronze medal	Viktor Minibaev	Russia

The Men's 10 m platform competition of the 2020 European Aquatics Championships was held on 16 May 2021.

== Results ==
The preliminary round was started at 12:00. The final was held at 19:10.

Green denotes finalists

Rank	Diver	Nationality	Preliminary		Final	
Rank	Diver	Nationality	Points	Rank	Points	Rank
1st place, gold medalist(s)	Aleksandr Bondar	Russia	478.35	2	564.35	1
2nd place, silver medalist(s)	Tom Daley	Great Britain	482.25	1	533.30	2
3rd place, bronze medalist(s)	Viktor Minibaev	Russia	469.70	3	530.05	3
4	Timo Barthel	Germany	417.90	7	499.10	4
5	Noah Williams	Great Britain	425.75	6	480.65	5
6	Oleksiy Sereda	Ukraine	445.65	4	459.50	6
7	Jaden Eikermann Gregorchuk	Germany	368.10	12	428.60	7
8	Constantin Popovici	Romania	432.90	5	426.30	8
9	Vinko Paradzik	Sweden	370.00	11	419.20	9
10	Vladimir Harutyunyan	Armenia	391.50	9	389.50	10
11	Oleh Serbin	Ukraine	398.15	8	363.95	11
12	Riccardo Giovannini	Italy	386.35	10	342.90	12
13	Andreas Sargent Larsen	Italy	363.30	13	did not advance	
14	Athanasios Tsirikos	Greece	357.75	14	did not advance	
15	Matthieu Rosset	France	357.45	15	did not advance	
16	Nikolaos Molvalis	Greece	355.30	16	did not advance	
17	Vartan Bayanduryan	Armenia	354.60	17	did not advance	
18	Jan Wermelinger	Switzerland	325.30	18	did not advance	
19	Dariush Lotfi	Austria	307.75	19	did not advance	
20	Kıvanç Gür	Turkey	293.50	20	did not advance	
21	Artsiom Barouski	Belarus	287.35	21	did not advance	
22	Anton Knoll	Austria	283.15	22	did not advance	
