= Diving at the 2020 Summer Olympics – Men's synchronized 10 metre platform =

Men's synchronized 10 metre platform at the Games of the XXXII Olympiad
- Venue: Tokyo Aquatics Centre
- Date: 26 July 2021
- Competitors: 16 from 8 nations
- Winning total: 471.81

Medalists
1st place, gold medalist(s)		Tom Daley; Matty Lee	Great Britain
2nd place, silver medalist(s)		Cao Yuan; Chen Aisen	China
3rd place, bronze medalist(s)		Aleksandr Bondar; Viktor Minibaev	ROC

The men's 10 metre synchronized platform diving competition at the 2020 Summer Olympics in Tokyo was held on 26 July 2021 at the Tokyo Aquatics Centre. It was the 6th appearance of the event, which has been held at every Olympic Games since the 2000 Summer Olympics.

The medals for the competition were presented by Laura Chinchilla, Costa Rica; IOC Member, and the medalists' bouquets were presented by Brent Nowicki, United States; FINA Executive Director.

== Competition format ==
The competition was held in a single round, consisting of each pair performing six dives. The dives had to be from 5 different groups (forward, back, reverse, inward, twisting, and armstand). The first two dives were given a fixed degree of difficulty of 2.0, regardless of the dive performed. The other four dives were assigned a degree of difficulty based on somersaults, position, twists, approach, and entry. There was no limit to the degree of difficulty of dives; the most difficult dives calculated in the FINA rulebook (reverse 4 1/2 somersault in pike position and armstand reverse 4 somersault in pike position) are 4.8, but competitors could attempt more difficult dives. Scoring was done by a panel of eleven judges, with five judges evaluating synchronization and three judges evaluating execution of each individual diver. For each dive, each judge gave a score between 0 and 10 with 0.5 point increments. The top and bottom synchronization scores and the top and bottom execution scores for each diver were discarded. The remaining five scores were summed, multiplied by 3/5, and multiplied by the degree of difficulty to give a dive score. The six dive scores were summed to give the score for the round.

== Schedule ==
All times were Japan standard time (UTC+9)

Date	Time	Round
26 July 2021	15:00	Final

== Qualification ==
The top 3 teams at the 2019 World Aquatics Championships earned a quota spot for their NOC. Japan, as the host country, was guaranteed a quota spot. The next 4 teams at the 2020 FINA World Cup also received a quota spot. Divers had to be at least 14 years old by the end of 2020 to compete.

== Results ==
Rank	Divers	Nation	Final						
Rank	Divers	Nation	Dive 1	Dive 2	Dive 3	Dive 4	Dive 5	Dive 6	Points
1st place, gold medalist(s)	Tom Daley; Matty Lee	Great Britain	52.80	54.60	79.68	93.96	89.76	101.01	471.81
2nd place, silver medalist(s)	Cao Yuan; Chen Aisen	China	54.00	57.60	90.78	73.44	93.24	101.52	470.58
3rd place, bronze medalist(s)	Aleksandr Bondar; Viktor Minibaev	ROC	52.80	51.60	78.54	89.64	77.70	89.64	439.92
4	Diego Balleza; Kevin Berlin Reyes	Mexico	50.40	50.40	76.80	75.48	72.15	82.08	407.31
5	Vincent Riendeau; Nathan Zsombor-Murray	Canada	52.20	52.80	74.88	79.20	65.28	80.64	405.00
6	Oleh Serbin; Oleksiy Sereda	Ukraine	47.40	49.20	80.64	79.20	72.00	72.00	400.44
7	Kim Yeong-nam; Woo Ha-ram	South Korea	48.60	42.60	73.92	73.44	82.08	75.48	396.12
8	Hiroki Ito; Kazuki Murakami	Japan	51.00	52.20	72.00	65.70	59.40	76.80	377.10
