= Max Brick =

English diver (born 1992)

Personal information
- Born: 5 July 1992 (age 33) Southampton, United Kingdom
- Height: 5 ft 5.5 in (1.66 m)

Sport
- Country: United Kingdom
- Event(s): 10 m, 10 m synchro
- Club: Southampton Diving Academy
- Partner: Tom Daley
Medal record
Commonwealth Games
Gold medal – first place	2010 New Delhi	10 metre platform synchro

Max Brick (born 5 July 1992) is an English diver who represents Southampton Diving Academy and specialises in the 10 metre platform event.

At the 2009 British Championships Brick won gold in the synchronised platform event in partnership with Jack Clewlow, and came 4th in the individual event. Subsequently, he was selected by the national coaches as the new synchro partner for British and European champion Tom Daley, who had not been able to compete in the synchro at the national championships after his previous partner Blake Aldridge was beaten up in a nightclub. Brick is only two years older than Daley, compared with the twelve-year age gap between Daley and Aldridge.

Daley and Brick came fifth on their debut as the 2009 FINA World Series event in Sheffield, and picked up a silver medal at the FINA Diving Grand Prix in Fort Lauderdale, Florida in their second outing.

In 2010, Brick also dived with Peter Waterfield, as the national selectors experimented to find the best pair. After Waterfield pulled out of the 2010 Commonwealth Games due to his concerns about conditions in the athletes village, Brick and Daley reunited to win gold medals in the 10 metre synchro event.

== Post-retirement life ==
After retiring from professional diving, Brick became a diving coach. As of 2024, he works as the head diving coach at the Bolzano Nuoto, in Bolzano, Italy.
