= Diving at the 2016 Summer Olympics – Men's synchronized 10 metre platform =

Men's synchronized 10 metre platform at the Games of the XXXI Olympiad
- Venue: Maria Lenk Aquatic Center
- Date: 8 August 2016
- Competitors: 16 from 8 nations
- Teams: 8 pairs
- Winning total: 496.98 points

Medalists
1st place, gold medalist(s)		Chen Aisen; Lin Yue	China
2nd place, silver medalist(s)		David Boudia; Steele Johnson	United States
3rd place, bronze medalist(s)		Tom Daley; Daniel Goodfellow	Great Britain

The men's synchronized 10 metre platform diving competition at the 2016 Summer Olympics in Rio de Janeiro took place on 8 August at the Maria Lenk Aquatic Center in Barra da Tijuca.

== Competition format ==
The competition was held in a single stage with each two-person team making six rounds of dives. There were eleven judges scoring each dive made by each team - three judges for each diver; six in total, and five judges for synchronisation. Only the middle score counted for each diver, with the middle three counting for synchronisation. These five scores were averaged, multiplied by 3, and multiplied by the dive's degree of difficulty to give a total dive score. The scores for each of the six dives were summed to give a final score.

== Schedule ==
Times are Brasília time, BRT (UTC−03:00)

Date	Time	Round
Monday 8 Aug 2016	16:00	Final

== Results ==
Rank	Nation	Dives						Total
Rank	Nation	1	2	3	4	5	6	Total
1st place, gold medalist(s)	China; Chen Aisen; Lin Yue	57.00	57.00	92.82	85.32	106.56	98.28	496.98
2nd place, silver medalist(s)	United States; David Boudia; Steele Johnson	54.00	53.40	83.52	85.68	85.47	95.04	457.11
3rd place, bronze medalist(s)	Great Britain; Tom Daley; Daniel Goodfellow	51.60	49.80	79.68	81.60	92.13	89.64	444.45
4	Germany; Patrick Hausding; Sascha Klein	51.00	48.60	74.88	92.88	84.66	86.40	438.42
5	Mexico; Iván García; Germán Sánchez	51.60	49.20	79.92	82.14	77.22	83.22	423.30
6	Ukraine; Maksym Dolhov; Oleksandr Horshkovozov	50.40	49.80	77.76	84.48	68.82	90.72	421.98
7	Russia; Viktor Minibaev; Nikita Shleikher	51.00	48.60	78.54	67.71	87.48	84.24	417.57
8	Brazil; Jackson Rondinelli; Hugo Parisi	49.80	48.00	71.10	70.08	61.38	68.16	368.52
