= Olympic Dreams (TV series) =

British television series

Olympic Dreams is a British television series, a co-production between the BBC and the Open University, with the intent of tracking a group of young British athletes bidding for Olympic success at the 2012 Summer Olympics in London.

The first series of programmes were broadcast at the end of 2007. The second series started in July 2008.

The athletes being tracked are:

- Jessica Ennis – heptathlete
- Darius Knight, Paul Drinkhall – table tennis players
- Shanaze Reade – BMX cyclist
- Lee Pearson – paralympic dressage rider
- Andy Triggs-Hodge, Alex Partridge, Pete Reed, Steve Williams – Men's coxless four
- Tom Daley – diver
- Ben Swift – cyclist
- Jessica Hogg, Elizabeth Beddoe, Venus Romaeo – gymnasts
