= Daniel Goodfellow =

British diver (born 1996)

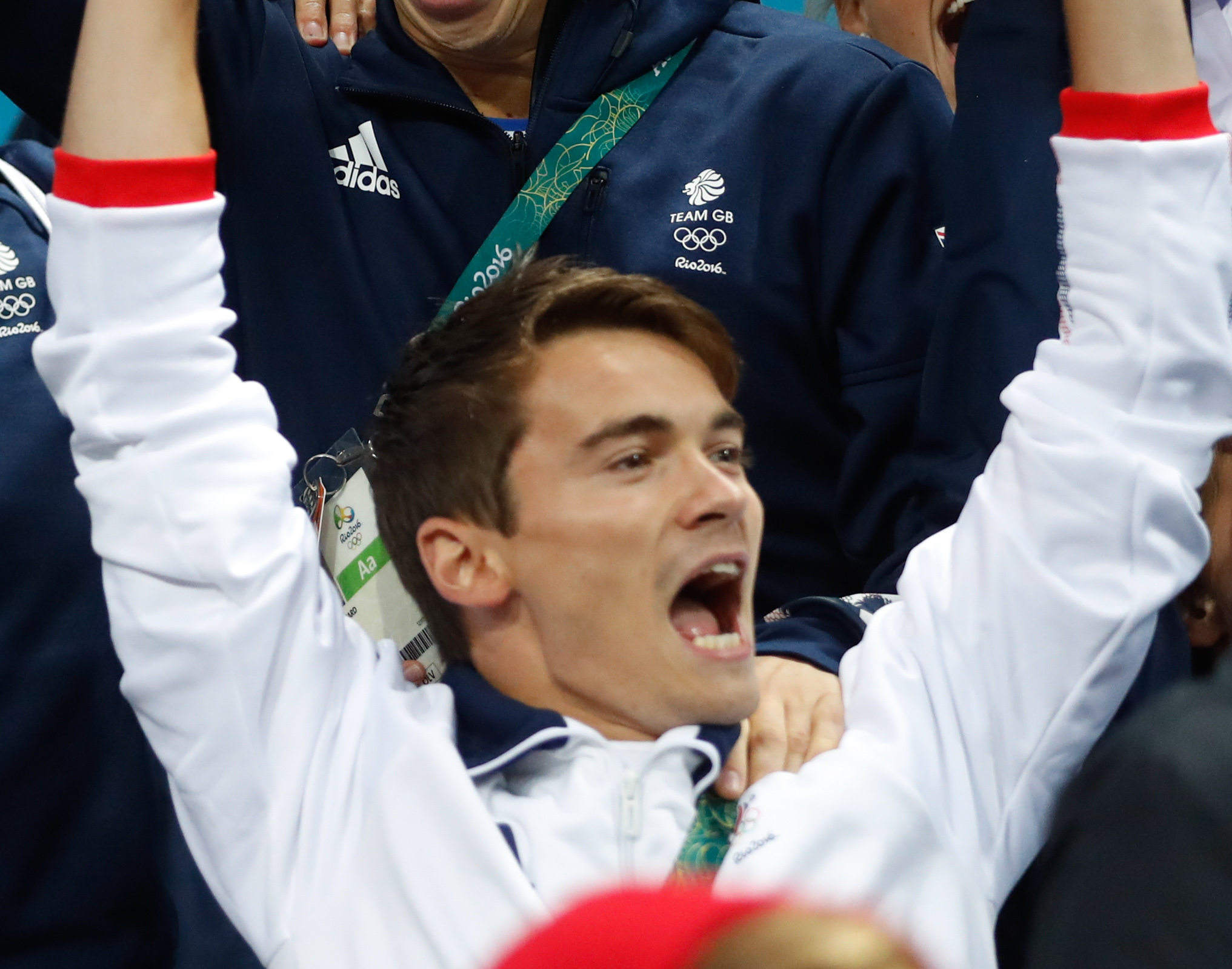
- Goodfellow at the 2016 Summer Olympics

Personal information
- Born: 19 October 1996 (age 30) Cambridge, England, United Kingdom
- Height: 1.68 m (5 ft 6 in)
- Weight: 58 kg (128 lb)

Sport
- Country: Great Britain; England
- Sport: Diving
- Events: 3 m, 10 m, 10 m synchro
- Club: City of Leeds
- Coached by: Marc Holdsworth
- Retired: 2025
Medal record
Men's diving
Representing Great Britain
Olympic Games
Bronze medal – third place	2016 Rio de Janeiro	10 m synchro
World Championships
Gold medal – first place	2024 Doha	Team event
Silver medal – second place	2019 Gwangju	3 m synchro
European Championships
Silver medal – second place	2016 London	10 m synchro
Junior European Championships
Gold medal – first place	2013 Poznan	10 m platform
FINA Diving World Cup
Gold medal – first place	2021 Tokyo	3 m synchro
Bronze medal – third place	2016 Rio de Janeiro	10 m synchro
Representing England
Commonwealth Games
Gold medal – first place	2018 Gold Coast	10 m synchro
Gold medal – first place	2022 Birmingham	3 m springboard

Daniel Goodfellow (born 19 October 1996) is a retired British diver, active in the elite sport since 2011, and in the senior ranks from 2013-2025. A close contemporary of Olympic and world champions Tom Daley and Jack Laugher, Goodfellow competed with both in senior synchronised and team events for Great Britain and England. With Daley, he won bronze in the 10 metre synchronised platform event at the 2016 Summer Olympics in Rio.

Goodfellow is a two-time Commonwealth Games champion, a World champion in the team event in 2024 and an Olympic bronze medalist in the synchronised event in 2016. He first represented Great Britain as a senior at the 2013 European Diving Championships in the 10 m platform event and the 2013 World Aquatics Championships in the same event. Goodfellow won a bronze medal in the Men's 10m Synchronised Platform event with his diving partner Tom Daley at the 2016 Summer Olympics in Rio de Janeiro. He has also won a gold with Daley in the same event at the Commonwealth Games, and a silver at the European Championships. In 2022 he won his first major title as a solo diver, winning gold in the men's 3 metre springboard at the 2022 Commonwealth Games. During his senior career, Goodfellow won medals in every major championship available to him; the Olympic and Commonwealth Games, the World and European Championships and the FINA World Series.

Goodfellow's career also coincided with a period of sustained success for Great Britain in the sport, and the growing depth in the men's events in his nation. Having narrowly failed to gain selection for a third Olympic Games in 2024, he retired from the sport in 2025.

== Early life ==
Goodfellow was born in Cambridge on 19 October 1996 to Sharon (née Baxter) and John Goodfellow. His father John was diagnosed with a brain tumour at the age of 28 and died in 2006 at the age of 39. From 2008 to 2013, he was a student at Melbourn Village College.

Goodfellow started attending sessions held by Cambridge Dive Team at Parkside Pools when he was young. He won gold medals in 10m platform as well as 3m and 1m springboard in the 10 to 11-year-old category of the 2007 ASA National Age Group Championships as well as a bronze in the synchro. In 2012, when he was 15, he was selected for the Great Britain development squad for his potential to be successful in sports. He moved to Plymouth to train in 2013 and joined Plymouth Diving Club.

== Career ==
=== 2011–2015 ===
In 2011, at the age of 14, Goodfellow won his first medal in a major competition at the European Junior Diving Championships in Belgrade, winning bronze in the 3m springboard. In 2012, he won silver on the 10m platform, bronze on individual 3m springboard, and gold on the 3m springboard synchro with Freddie Woodward at the International Youth Meet in Dresden, Germany. In 2013, he won gold in the 10-metre platform at the European Junior Championships.

Goodfellow also made his senior international debut in 2013 at the European Championships in Rostock and World Championships in Barcelona. In 2014 Goodfellow partnered with Matty Lee in the FINA Diving World Series, and won 10m Synchro bronze in two World Series legs in Dubai and Beijing. However, in the build-up to the 2014 Commonwealth Games in Glasgow, Goodfellow suffered an elbow injury, which sidelined him from participating in the competition in Glasgow. Soon thereafter, he had a shoulder injury that damaged a nerve, for which he had surgery on Christmas Eve, 2014.

The surgery on his shoulder meant that he was unable to compete for some time in 2015. Goodfellow returned to competitive diving competition in the summer of 2015 at the tail-end of the season in the 3m springboard event in Bolzano, Italy.

=== 2016 ===
Goodfellow had to wait until the British National Cup in Southend in January 2016 to again compete in 10m diving. He participated in the individual 10m competition and teamed up with Tom Daley in the 10m synchro competition. Goodfellow first met Tom Daley, the 2012 London Olympics individual 10m bronze medalist, in 2015. He won bronze in the individual 10m dive and a gold with Daley in the 10 m synchro.

Goodfellow and Daley earned a place in the 10m platform synchro competition at the 2016 Olympics in Rio de Janeiro by winning the bronze medal at the FINA Diving World Cup on 21 February 2016. They produced the single best synchro 10m diving score, achieving it with a forward four-and-a-half somersault (109C), with a difficulty of 3.7, which was awarded 91.02 points. Goodfellow and Daley won medals at each of the 2016 FINA World Series 10m synchro events – Beijing (bronze), Dubai (silver), Windsor (silver), Kazan (bronze) – and were second place overall. They improved their score each time they competed in the FINA World Series – Beijing (420.15), Dubai (428.91), Windsor (441.84), Kazan (442.59). Goodfellow and Daley were the first Britons to win medals in all the 10m synchro FINA World Series events in one year.

On 12 May 2016 at the European Championships, Goodfellow and Daley earned their seventh consecutive 10m synchro medal. They were in position for gold after the first five dives of the competition, but had to settle for silver after Germany passed them by less than one point in the final round.

On 10 June 2016, at the British National Championships Goodfellow and Daley won gold in the 10m synchro. Their Front 4 1/2 Somersaults tucked dive (109C) was their best single dive in the competition, and received a score of 95.46. Goodfellow and Daley earned a bronze medal in the 2016 Olympic 10m synchro competition in Rio on 8 August primarily by scoring 92.13 on their fifth dive, which was a 109C with a 3.7 degree of difficulty. This was their highest scoring dive. This score moved them from fifth to third. Their sixth dive was a 207B dive, with a 3.6-degree of difficulty, and had to be 84 or higher for them to maintain third place and edge out Germany. The score of 89.64 for their sixth dive ended the competition, and resulted in the bronze medal for Goodfellow and Daley.

=== 2018–2019 ===
At the 2018 Commonwealth Games held at the Gold Coast, Australia, Goodfellow won gold on the men's synchronised 10m platform with Tom Daley.

In 2019, Goodfellow partnered with Jack Laugher in men's synchronised 3m springboard as Laugher's regular partner Chris Mears had taken a year out from competition, while Daley partnered with Matty Lee in the 10m platform synchro. At the 2019 World Aquatics Championships held in Gwangju, South Korea, he won silver in the 3m synchronised with Laugher.

=== 2021–2022 ===
At the 2021 FINA Diving World Cup held in Japan as an official test event for the 2020 Tokyo Olympics, Goodfellow won gold in synchronised 3m springboard with Laugher.

He competed for England at the 2022 Commonwealth Games where he won a gold medal in the Men's 3 metre springboard event.

=== 2025 ===
On 11 January, Goodfellow announced his retirement from diving via a post on Instagram. Praising his fellow divers and coaches, he described how "fortunate and privileged" he felt to have "been part of an era of British diving that has seen so much success and growth".
