= Central Park, Plymouth =

Park in Plymouth, Devon

Coordinates: 50°23′8.74″N 4°9′5.2″W

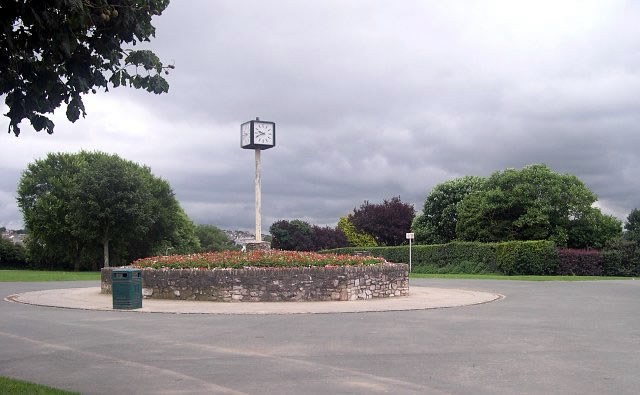
- Interactive map of Central Park, Plymouth
- Location: Plymouth, England
- Area: 68 hectares (0.68 km^{2})
- Created: 1928
- Website: https://www.plymouth.gov.uk/central-park

Plymouth's Central Park is situated to the north-east of Plymouth city centre in south-west Devon, England. Covering 68 hectares, Central Park is the largest park in Plymouth. It was created in 1928 with the aim to improve the health of the city's residents. The park is trust land; developments on the land must be for the purpose of leisure activities.

== Activities and facilities ==
The park has multiple sports and recreation facilities such as football, rugby, and cricket pitches, as well as a golf course, a bowling green, a baseball diamond, and the Central Park Leisure Pools. It is also known for the Plymouth Life Centre and Home Park Stadium, which is home to the Plymouth Argyle Football Club.

== History ==
In 1923, the land for the park, previously used for agriculture, was sold cheaply to the City Council on the condition that it was to remain a public open space. A plan was presented for the space in 1928, and the laying out of the park was approved in 1929. The park opened in 1931 but many of the planned features were never built due to funding shortages.

In the mid-1990s, Plymouth Argyle had plans to build a completely new 25,000-seat stadium in the area. These were cancelled in favour of redeveloping Home Park.

The playground area, themed on continents of the world, was demolished and rebuilt out of wood in 2018 as part of a £9 million redevelopment project for the park.

In 2007 the council opted to demolish the ageing Leisure Pools and Mayflower Leisure Centre rather than refurbish them and replace them with a new larger combined indoor sports complex (Plymouth Life Centre) with multi-purpose indoor pitches, basketball court, swimming pool and a café among other venues. By 2012 the Mayflower Leisure Centre and the Central Park Leisure Pools had been demolished, and the Plymouth Life Centre was officially opened on Saturday 24 March.
