= Christofer Eskilsson =

Swedish diver

Personal information
- Born: 20 April 1989 (age 35); Malmö, Sweden

Sport
- Sport: Diving

Christofer Eskilsson (born 20 April 1989) is a Swedish diver. He competed for Sweden at the 2012 Summer Olympics in the 10 m platform diving event, finishing in 25th place. He competes for the club, Malmö KK.
