= Timofei Hordeichik =

Belarusian diver

Personal information
- Native name: Тимофей Дмитриевич Гордейчик
- National team: Belarus
- Born: 4 January 1986 (age 40) Minsk, Belarus
- Height: 171 cm (5 ft 7 in)
- Weight: 63 kg (139 lb)

Sport
- Sport: Diving
- Event: Men's 10 m Platform Diving
- Partner: Vadim Kaptur

Achievements and titles
- Regional finals: Bronze medal, European Aquatics Championships 2010
Medal record
European Aquatics Championships
Bronze medal – third place	2010 Budapest	Men's 10 m Synchronised Diving
- Updated on 20 January 2016

Timofei Hordeichik (born 4 January 1986) is a Belarusian diver. He competed for Belarus at the 2012 Summer Olympics in the men's 10 m platform diving.

He and teammate Vadim Kaptur won the bronze medal in the men's 10 m synchronised diving at the 2010 European Aquatics Championships. This pair have also won medals at Grand Prix level.
