= Loïs Szymczak =

French diver (born 1993)

Personal information
- Born: 8 March 1993 (age 33) Paris, France

Sport
- Country: France
- Sport: Diving

Loïs Szymczak (born 8 March 1993) is a French diver who represented France at the 2024 Olympic Games. He placed 8th in the men's 10 meter synchronized platform competition with partner Gary Hunt.
