= Francesco Dell'Uomo =

Italian diver (born 1987)

Personal information
- Full name: Francesco Dell'Uomo
- Born: 8 January 1987 (age 39) Colleferro

Sport
- Country: Italy
Medal record
Men's diving
Representing Italy
European Championships
Bronze medal – third place	2006 Budapest	10 m synchro
Bronze medal – third place	2008 Eindhoven	10 m platform

Francesco Dell'Uomo (born 8 January 1987 in Colleferro) is an Italian diver.

In the 10 metre platform event he finished ninth at the 2004 Olympic Games and won the bronze medal at the 2008 European Aquatics Championships. At the 2006 European Aquatics Championships he won a bronze medal in the 10 m Platform Synchro event.
