= Diving at the Asian Games =

- Governing bodies: AQUA (World) / AA (Asia)
- Events: 10 (men: 5; women: 5)

Games
- 1951; 1954; 1958; 1962; 1966; 1970; 1974; 1978; 1982; 1986; 1990; 1994; 1998; 2002; 2006; 2010; 2014; 2018; 2022; 2026
- Medalists

Diving is a part of the Asian Games since the first edition of the continental sports event in 1951, when New Delhi hosted the Games.

== Editions ==
Games	Year	Host city	Best nation
I	1951	New Delhi, India	India
II	1954	Manila, Philippines	Japan
III	1958	Tokyo, Japan	Japan
IV	1962	Jakarta, Indonesia	Japan
V	1966	Bangkok, Thailand	Japan
VI	1970	Bangkok, Thailand	Japan
VII	1974	Tehran, Iran	China
VIII	1978	Bangkok, Thailand	China
IX	1982	New Delhi, India	China
X	1986	Seoul, South Korea	China
XI	1990	Beijing, China	China
XII	1994	Hiroshima, Japan	China
XIII	1998	Bangkok, Thailand	China
XIV	2002	Busan, South Korea	China
XV	2006	Doha, Qatar	China
XVI	2010	Guangzhou, China	China
XVII	2014	Incheon, South Korea	China
XVIII	2018	Jakarta–Palembang, Indonesia	China
XIX	2022	Hangzhou, China	China
XX	2026	Aichi–Nagoya, Japan	China

== Events ==
Event	51	54	58	62	66	70	74	78	82	86	90	94	98	02	06	10	14	18	22	26	Years
Men
1 m springboard											X				X	X	X	X	X	X	7
3 m springboard	X	X	X	X	X	X	X	X	X	X	X	X	X	X	X	X	X	X	X	X	20
10 m platform	X	X	X	X	X	X	X	X	X	X	X	X	X	X	X	X	X	X	X	X	20
Synchronized 3 m springboard														X	X	X	X	X	X	X	7
Synchronized 10 m platform														X	X	X	X	X	X	X	7
Team											X										1
Women
1 m springboard											X				X	X	X	X	X	X	7
3 m springboard		X	X	X	X	X	X	X	X	X	X	X	X	X	X	X	X	X	X	X	19
10 m platform		X	X	X	X	X	X	X	X	X	X	X	X	X	X	X	X	X	X	X	19
Synchronized 3 m springboard														X	X	X	X	X	X	X	7
Synchronized 10 m platform														X	X	X	X	X	X	X	7
Team											X										1
Total	2	4	4	4	4	4	4	4	4	4	8	4	4	8	10	10	10	10	10	10	

== Medal table ==
Rank	Nation	Gold	Silver	Bronze	Total
1	China (CHN)	100	65	5	170
2	Japan (JPN)	17	24	37	78
3	India (IND)	2	1	2	5
4	South Korea (KOR)	1	11	23	35
5	Indonesia (INA)	1	1	4	6
6	Israel (ISR)	1	1	0	2
7	Malaysia (MAS)	0	10	23	33
8	North Korea (PRK)	0	8	15	23
9	Iran (IRI)	0	1	3	4
10	Thailand (THA)	0	0	3	3
11	Chinese Taipei (TPE)	0	0	2	2
11	Kazakhstan (KAZ)	0	0	2	2
13	Macau (MAC)	0	0	1	1
13	Philippines (PHI)	0	0	1	1
Totals (14 entries)		122	122	121	365
