= Diving at the 2006 Asian Games =

- Venue: Hamad Aquatic Centre
- Dates: 10–14 December 2006
- Competitors: 62 from 13 nations

Diving was contested at the 2006 Asian Games in Doha, Qatar from December 10 to December 14. Men's and women's individual and synchronized events were held. All competition took place at the Hamad Aquatic Centre.

== Schedule ==
| P | Preliminary | F | Final |

| Event↓/Date → | 10th Sun | 11th Mon | 12th Tue | | 13th Wed | | 14th Thu | |
|---|---|---|---|---|---|---|---|---|
| Men's 1 m springboard | | | P | F | | | | |
| Men's 3 m springboard | | | | | P | F | | |
| Men's 10 m platform | | | | | | | P | F |
| Men's synchronized 3 m springboard | F | | | | | | | |
| Men's synchronized 10 m platform | | F | | | | | | |
| Women's 1 m springboard | | | F | | | | | |
| Women's 3 m springboard | | | | | P | F | | |
| Women's 10 m platform | | | | | | | F | |
| Women's synchronized 3 m springboard | | F | | | | | | |
| Women's synchronized 10 m platform | F | | | | | | | |

== Medalists ==
=== Men ===
| Event | Gold | Silver | Bronze |
|---|---|---|---|
| 1 m springboard | Luo Yutong; China | Qin Kai; China | Ken Terauchi; Japan |
| 3 m springboard | He Chong; China | Luo Yutong; China | Ken Terauchi; Japan |
| 10 m platform | Lin Yue; China | Zhou Lüxin; China | Kim Chon-man; North Korea |
| Synchronized 3 m springboard | China; Wang Feng; He Chong | Malaysia; Rossharisham Roslan; Yeoh Ken Nee | South Korea; Kwon Kyung-min; Cho Kwan-hoon |
| Synchronized 10 m platform | China; Lin Yue; Huo Liang | North Korea; Ri Jong-nam; Kim Chon-man | South Korea; Kwon Kyung-min; Cho Kwan-hoon |

=== Women ===
| Event | Gold | Silver | Bronze |
|---|---|---|---|
| 1 m springboard | Wu Minxia; China | He Zi; China | Elizabeth Jimie; Malaysia |
| 3 m springboard | Wu Minxia; China | He Zi; China | Leong Mun Yee; Malaysia |
| 10 m platform | Wang Xin; China | Chen Ruolin; China | Hong In-sun; North Korea |
| Synchronized 3 m springboard | China; Guo Jingjing; Li Ting | Japan; Misako Yamashita; Ryoko Nishii | Malaysia; Leong Mun Yee; Elizabeth Jimie |
| Synchronized 10 m platform | China; Jia Tong; Chen Ruolin | Japan; Misako Yamashita; Mai Nakagawa | North Korea; Hong In-sun; Choe Kum-hui |

== Medal table ==
| Rank | Nation | Gold | Silver | Bronze | Total |
|---|---|---|---|---|---|
| 1 | China (CHN) | 10 | 6 | 0 | 16 |
| 2 | Japan (JPN) | 0 | 2 | 2 | 4 |
| 3 | Malaysia (MAS) | 0 | 1 | 3 | 4 |
| 3 | North Korea (PRK) | 0 | 1 | 3 | 4 |
| 5 | South Korea (KOR) | 0 | 0 | 2 | 2 |
| Totals (5 entries) | | 10 | 10 | 10 | 30 |

== Participating nations ==
A total of 62 athletes from 13 nations competed in diving at the 2006 Asian Games:

- China (14)
- Chinese Taipei (3)
- Japan (8)
- Kuwait (2)
- Macau (4)
- Malaysia (6)
- North Korea (4)
- Philippines (6)
- Qatar (3)
- South Korea (4)
- Thailand (3)
- Uzbekistan (1)
- Vietnam (4)
