= Diving at the 2010 Asian Games =

- Venue: Aoti Aquatics Centre
- Dates: 22–26 November 2010
- Competitors: 74 from 14 nations

Diving at the 2010 Asian Games was held in Guangzhou, China from November 22 to 26, 2010. Ten competitions were held in both, men and women's. All competition took place at the Aoti Aquatics Centre.

== Schedule ==
P	Preliminary	F	Final

Event↓/Date →	22nd Mon	23rd Tue	24th Wed	25th Thu		26th Fri	
Men's 1 m springboard			F				
Men's 3 m springboard				P	F		
Men's 10 m platform						P	F
Men's synchronized 3 m springboard		F					
Men's synchronized 10 m platform	F						
Women's 1 m springboard			F				
Women's 3 m springboard						P	F
Women's 10 m platform				P	F		
Women's synchronized 3 m springboard	F						
Women's synchronized 10 m platform		F					

== Medalists ==
=== Men ===
Event	Gold	Silver	Bronze
1 m springboard	He Min; China	Qin Kai; China	Yeoh Ken Nee; Malaysia
3 m springboard	He Chong; China	Luo Yutong; China	Yeoh Ken Nee; Malaysia
10 m platform	Cao Yuan; China	Huo Liang; China	Bryan Nickson Lomas; Malaysia
Synchronized 3 m springboard	China; Luo Yutong; Qin Kai	Malaysia; Bryan Nickson Lomas; Yeoh Ken Nee	South Korea; Park Ji-ho; Son Seong-cheol
Synchronized 10 m platform	China; Yang Liguang; Zhou Lüxin	Malaysia; Bryan Nickson Lomas; Ooi Tze Liang	North Korea; Kim Chon-man; So Myong-hyok

=== Women ===
Event	Gold	Silver	Bronze
1 m springboard	Wu Minxia; China	Zheng Shuangxue; China	Cheong Jun Hoong; Malaysia
3 m springboard	He Zi; China	Shi Tingmao; China	Choi Sut Ian; Macau
10 m platform	Hu Yadan; China	Wang Hao; China	Pandelela Rinong; Malaysia
Synchronized 3 m springboard	China; Shi Tingmao; Wang Han	Malaysia; Leong Mun Yee; Ng Yan Yee	Japan; Mai Nakagawa; Sayaka Shibusawa
Synchronized 10 m platform	China; Chen Ruolin; Wang Hao	Malaysia; Leong Mun Yee; Pandelela Rinong	North Korea; Choe Kum-hui; Kim Un-hyang

== Medal table ==
Rank	Nation	Gold	Silver	Bronze	Total
1	China (CHN)	10	6	0	16
2	Malaysia (MAS)	0	4	5	9
3	North Korea (PRK)	0	0	2	2
4	Japan (JPN)	0	0	1	1
4	Macau (MAC)	0	0	1	1
4	South Korea (KOR)	0	0	1	1
Totals (6 entries)		10	10	10	30

== Participating nations ==
A total of 74 athletes from 14 nations competed in diving at the 2010 Asian Games:

- Athletes from Kuwait (3)
- China (16)
- Hong Kong (2)
- Indonesia (5)
- Iran (4)
- Japan (7)
- Laos (2)
- Macau (4)
- Malaysia (9)
- North Korea (5)
- Philippines (5)
- Qatar (1)
- South Korea (8)
- Vietnam (3)
