= North Korea at the 2006 Asian Games =

- IOC code: PRK
- NOC: Olympic Committee of the Democratic People's Republic of Korea

in Doha
- Flag bearer: Ri Kum-suk
- Medals Ranked 16th: Gold 6 Silver 8 Bronze 15 Total 29

Asian Games appearances (overview)
- 1974; 1978; 1982; 1986; 1990; 1994; 1998; 2002; 2006; 2010; 2014; 2018; 2022; 2026

North Korea participated at the 2006 Asian Games held in Doha, Qatar from 1 to 15 December 2006. North Korea ranked 16th in the medal table with 6 gold medals.

It marched together with South Korea at the opening ceremony under the Korean Unification Flag, but both countries competed as separate teams at the event.

== Background ==
North Korea is a member of the Olympic Council of Asia and has competed in the Asian Games since the 1974 Asian Games in Tehran.

== Archery ==
North Korea sent three athletes to participate in archery, all of which were female. As a team, North Korea finished fourth in recurve. For the individual rankings, North Korea finished 10th and 11th.

== Boxing ==
Four North Korean pugilists went to the Games. Kim Song-guk received the bronze medal in the Feather 57Kg category. Song-guk had a bye during the qualification round. In the preliminary and quarterfinal rounds, he won by RSCOS. In the semifinals, he lost by points.

Athlete	Event	Qualification	Preliminary	Quarterfinal	Semifinal	Final		Ref
Athlete	Event	Opposition Result	Opposition Result	Opposition Result	Opposition Result	Opposition Result	Rank	Ref
Ro Sok	Light flyweight (48 kg)	BYE	Suban Pannon (THA); L	Did not advance				
Kwak Hyok Ju	Flyweight (51 kg)	Jitender Kumar (IND); L	Did not advance					
Kim Won Guk	Bantamweight (54 kg)	BYE	Gu Yu (CHN); W	Joan Tipon (PHI); L	Did not advance			
Kim Song-guk	Featherweight (57 kg)	BYE	Saqid Abdullatef (QAT); W RSCOS	Ahmed Ahmed Mayouf (KSA); W RSCOS	Sultonov Bahodirjon (UZB); L PTS	Did not advance		

== Wushu ==
Won To-Song was the only athlete sent from North Korea to participate in the sanda 60 kg wushu. He had a bye during the first preliminary round, and won 2-0 against Afghanistan's Amirshah Amiri in the second preliminary round. During the Quarterfinals, he lost 2-1 to India's M. Bimoljit Singh.

== Medalists ==
Medal	Name	Sport	Event	Date
Gold	An Kum-ae	Judo	Women's 52 kg	4
Gold	Jo Jong-chol	Gymnastics	Men's pommel horse	5
Gold	Hong Su-jong	Gymnastics	Women's uneven bars	5
Gold	Ri Se-gwang	Gymnastics	Men's vault	6
Gold	Kim Myong-hwa	Shooting	Women's skeet	7
Gold	Phi Un-hui; Jang Ok-gyong; Om Jong-ran; Sonu Kyong-sun; Song Jong-sun; Ri Un-suk; Kim Yong-ae; Ri Un-gyong; Ho Sun-hui; Kim Hye-yong; Kim Tan-sil; Kong Hye-ok; Ri Kum-suk; Jong Pok-sim; Ri Un-hyang; Jon Myong-hui; Kim Kyong-hwa; Kil Son-hui	Football	Women	13
Silver	Chae Hye-gyong; Kim Yong-bok; Pak Yong-hui	Shooting	Women's trap team	2
Silver	Kim Jong-su	Shooting	Men's 10 metre air pistol	3
Silver	Hong Su-jong	Gymnastics	Women's vault	5
Silver	Kim Hyon-ung; Kim Jong-su; Ryu Myong-yon	Shooting	Men's 50 metre pistol team	5
Silver	Kang Kum-sun; Kim Ok-bun; Kim Ryon-ok; Yu Sun-ok	Rowing	Women's coxless four	6
Silver	Kim Myong-hwa; Pak Jong-ran; Pak Kum-hui	Shooting	Women's skeet team	7
Silver	Ri Jong-nam; Kim Chon-man	Diving	Men's synchronized 10 m platform	11
Silver	Jon Hyon-guk	Wrestling	Men's freestyle 55 kg	14
Bronze	Won Ok-im	Judo	Women's 63 kg	3
Bronze	Kim Jong; Kim Mi-yong; Ko Un-gyong; Ryom Won-ok	Table tennis	Women's team	3
Bronze	Im Yong-su	Weightlifting	Men's 62 kg	3
Bronze	Pak Hyon-suk	Weightlifting	Women's 58 kg	3
Bronze	Hong Su-jong	Gymnastics	Women's artistic individual all-around	4
Bronze	Hong Ok-song	Judo	Women's 57 kg	4
Bronze	Hong Un-jong	Gymnastics	Women's vault	5
Bronze	Kim Jong-su	Shooting	Men's 50 metre pistol	5
Bronze	Hwang Kum-song; Kim Ok-gyong; Kim Yong-mi; So Un-byol; Tokgo Pom; Wang Ok-gyong; Yun Hui	Artistic swimming	Women's team	9
Bronze	Hong In-sun; Choe Kum-hui	Diving	Women's synchronized 10 m platform	10
Bronze	Cha Kwang-su	Wrestling	Men's Greco-Roman 55 kg	10
Bronze	Kim Song-guk	Boxing	Men's 57 kg	12
Bronze	Ri Yong-chol	Wrestling	Men's freestyle 60 kg	13
Bronze	Kim Chon-man	Diving	Men's 10 m platform	14
Bronze	Hong In-sun	Diving	Women's 10 m platform	14
