= Shooting at the 2006 Asian Games – Men's 50 metre pistol =

Men's 50 metre pistol at the 2006 Asian Games
- Venue: Lusail Shooting Range
- Dates: 5 December 2006
- Competitors: 48 from 20 nations

Medalists
| gold medal | Xu Kun | China |
| silver medal | Rashid Yunusmetov | Kazakhstan |
| bronze medal | Kim Jong-su | North Korea |

The men's 50 metre pistol competition at the 2006 Asian Games in Doha, Qatar was held on 5 December at the Lusail Shooting Range.

== Schedule ==
All times are Arabia Standard Time (UTC+03:00)

| Date | Time | Event |
|---|---|---|
| Tuesday, 5 December 2006 | 08:00 | Qualification |
| Tuesday, 5 December 2006 | 11:00 | Final |

== Records ==
Prior to this competition, the existing world, Asian and Games records were as follows.

Qualification
| World Record | Aleksandr Melentyev (URS) | 581 | Moscow, Soviet Union | 20 July 1980 |
| Asian Record | Tan Zongliang (CHN) | 577 | Zagreb, Croatia | 24 July 2006 |
| Games Record | Wang Yifu (CHN) | 571 | Busan, South Korea | 2 October 2002 |
Final
| World Record | William Demarest (USA) | 676.2 | Milan, Italy | 4 June 2000 |
| Asian Record | Tan Zongliang (CHN) | 672.0 | Bangkok, Thailand | 22 February 2004 |
| Games Record | Masaru Nakashige (JPN) | 664.1 | Hiroshima, Japan | 7 October 1994 |

== Results ==
Legend

- DNS — Did not start

=== Qualification ===
| Rank | Athlete | Series | | | | | | Total | Notes |
| Rank | Athlete | 1 | 2 | 3 | 4 | 5 | 6 | Total | Notes |
|---|---|---|---|---|---|---|---|---|---|
| 1 | Xu Kun (CHN) | 96 | 95 | 95 | 92 | 91 | 96 | 565 | |
| 2 | Rashid Yunusmetov (KAZ) | 94 | 93 | 95 | 94 | 96 | 92 | 564 | |
| 3 | Susumu Kobayashi (JPN) | 94 | 95 | 91 | 94 | 93 | 96 | 563 | |
| 4 | Jin Jong-oh (KOR) | 91 | 97 | 97 | 94 | 93 | 91 | 563 | |
| 5 | Kim Jong-su (PRK) | 91 | 90 | 96 | 92 | 94 | 99 | 562 | |
| 6 | Tan Zongliang (CHN) | 93 | 94 | 93 | 96 | 95 | 90 | 561 | |
| 7 | Dilshod Mukhtarov (UZB) | 92 | 89 | 92 | 95 | 95 | 96 | 559 | |
| 8 | Jakkrit Panichpatikum (THA) | 95 | 92 | 90 | 95 | 93 | 94 | 559 | |
| 9 | Pang Wei (CHN) | 91 | 95 | 94 | 94 | 92 | 90 | 556 | |
| 10 | Kim Young-wook (KOR) | 94 | 91 | 92 | 91 | 90 | 95 | 553 | |
| 11 | Hoàng Xuân Vinh (VIE) | 91 | 95 | 89 | 92 | 92 | 94 | 553 | |
| 12 | Vladimir Issachenko (KAZ) | 92 | 93 | 91 | 93 | 90 | 94 | 553 | |
| 13 | Nguyễn Mạnh Tường (VIE) | 96 | 95 | 92 | 91 | 90 | 87 | 551 | |
| 14 | Samaresh Jung (IND) | 89 | 90 | 92 | 93 | 93 | 93 | 550 | |
| 15 | Ryu Myong-yon (PRK) | 93 | 94 | 90 | 92 | 90 | 91 | 550 | |
| 16 | Noppadon Sutiviruch (THA) | 94 | 89 | 90 | 90 | 94 | 91 | 548 | |
| 17 | Trần Quốc Cường (VIE) | 94 | 89 | 91 | 93 | 92 | 89 | 548 | |
| 18 | Kim Hyon-ung (PRK) | 90 | 93 | 92 | 89 | 90 | 93 | 547 | |
| 19 | Bapu Vanjare (IND) | 87 | 91 | 92 | 89 | 93 | 93 | 545 | |
| 20 | Chang Yi-ning (TPE) | 92 | 89 | 87 | 94 | 92 | 91 | 545 | |
| 21 | Maung Kyu (MYA) | 89 | 94 | 91 | 92 | 89 | 90 | 545 | |
| 22 | Liao Chi-ming (TPE) | 90 | 89 | 91 | 91 | 90 | 92 | 543 | |
| 23 | Lee Sang-do (KOR) | 92 | 89 | 89 | 95 | 87 | 89 | 541 | |
| 24 | Zakir Khan (IND) | 90 | 92 | 93 | 87 | 91 | 88 | 541 | |
| 25 | Lev Berner (KAZ) | 88 | 91 | 88 | 90 | 91 | 91 | 539 | |
| 26 | Tomohiro Kida (JPN) | 91 | 87 | 91 | 93 | 87 | 90 | 539 | |
| 27 | Edirisinghe Senanayake (SRI) | 89 | 91 | 83 | 91 | 92 | 92 | 538 | |
| 28 | Sergey Babikov (TJK) | 86 | 92 | 92 | 92 | 84 | 92 | 538 | |
| 29 | Hadi Al-Qahtani (KSA) | 90 | 89 | 97 | 88 | 89 | 85 | 538 | |
| 30 | Ayedh Al-Malki (KSA) | 86 | 91 | 83 | 94 | 87 | 95 | 536 | |
| 31 | Saran Wongehiaosiri (THA) | 91 | 85 | 92 | 91 | 85 | 92 | 536 | |
| 32 | Wu Kuo-yang (TPE) | 83 | 90 | 91 | 91 | 88 | 92 | 535 | |
| 33 | Khalid Ahmed Mohamed (BRN) | 84 | 93 | 90 | 88 | 89 | 90 | 534 | |
| 34 | Carolino Gonzales (PHI) | 88 | 88 | 92 | 88 | 83 | 92 | 531 | |
| 35 | Ebrahim Barkhordari (IRI) | 92 | 86 | 89 | 89 | 85 | 90 | 531 | |
| 36 | Mohsen Nasr Esfahani (IRI) | 89 | 85 | 89 | 88 | 91 | 89 | 531 | |
| 37 | Oleg Nabiev (TJK) | 87 | 88 | 90 | 90 | 89 | 85 | 529 | |
| 38 | Mohammed Al-Fakih (QAT) | 86 | 92 | 92 | 88 | 80 | 89 | 527 | |
| 39 | Saleh Al-Anazi (KSA) | 90 | 86 | 87 | 87 | 85 | 88 | 523 | |
| 40 | Fahriddin Sirodjiddinov (TJK) | 85 | 91 | 85 | 85 | 86 | 90 | 522 | |
| 41 | Ashban Sulaiman (BRN) | 89 | 84 | 89 | 89 | 84 | 87 | 522 | |
| 42 | Said Al-Hasani (OMA) | 89 | 85 | 83 | 86 | 92 | 86 | 521 | |
| 43 | Mohamed Al-Kaabi (QAT) | 82 | 89 | 88 | 88 | 83 | 89 | 519 | |
| 44 | Shaker Al-Burti (QAT) | 88 | 85 | 89 | 81 | 90 | 86 | 519 | |
| 45 | Ivan Jumatin (KGZ) | 88 | 88 | 81 | 83 | 92 | 80 | 512 | |
| 46 | Hossein Hosseini (IRI) | 82 | 94 | 83 | 81 | 77 | 94 | 511 | |
| 47 | Abdulhadi Al-Rawafjeh (BRN) | 83 | 93 | 78 | 81 | 73 | 87 | 495 | |
| — | Vladimir Grigoriev (KGZ) | | | | | | | DNS | |

=== Final ===
| Rank | Athlete | Qual. | Final | | | | | | | | | | | Total | S-off | Notes |
| Rank | Athlete | Qual. | 1 | 2 | 3 | 4 | 5 | 6 | 7 | 8 | 9 | 10 | Total | Total | S-off | Notes |
|---|---|---|---|---|---|---|---|---|---|---|---|---|---|---|---|---|
| 1st place, gold medalist(s) | Xu Kun (CHN) | 565 | 10.5 | 10.6 | 7.8 | 10.5 | 10.1 | 9.7 | 9.5 | 10.5 | 9.5 | 10.1 | 98.8 | 663.8 | | |
| 2nd place, silver medalist(s) | Rashid Yunusmetov (KAZ) | 564 | 9.3 | 9.4 | 9.8 | 9.8 | 10.0 | 8.0 | 10.4 | 9.9 | 9.1 | 10.8 | 96.5 | 660.5 | | |
| 3rd place, bronze medalist(s) | Kim Jong-su (PRK) | 562 | 9.6 | 10.1 | 9.1 | 9.5 | 9.1 | 9.5 | 10.6 | 10.2 | 8.5 | 10.5 | 96.7 | 658.7 | | |
| 4 | Susumu Kobayashi (JPN) | 563 | 8.1 | 10.3 | 8.8 | 9.7 | 9.0 | 10.1 | 9.5 | 9.4 | 8.8 | 10.4 | 94.1 | 657.1 | 10.5 | |
| 5 | Tan Zongliang (CHN) | 561 | 8.9 | 9.1 | 9.8 | 9.9 | 8.0 | 9.5 | 10.7 | 10.5 | 9.9 | 9.8 | 96.1 | 657.1 | 9.3 | |
| 6 | Jin Jong-oh (KOR) | 563 | 10.2 | 10.2 | 9.9 | 9.1 | 9.7 | 9.1 | 7.3 | 9.1 | 8.9 | 10.1 | 93.6 | 656.6 | | |
| 7 | Jakkrit Panichpatikum (THA) | 559 | 9.7 | 9.8 | 9.5 | 9.7 | 9.8 | 9.9 | 9.2 | 9.7 | 10.3 | 9.9 | 97.5 | 656.5 | | |
| 8 | Dilshod Mukhtarov (UZB) | 559 | 8.4 | 7.7 | 10.5 | 8.2 | 10.1 | 10.2 | 10.3 | 10.0 | 10.4 | 9.5 | 95.3 | 654.3 | | |
