= Shooting at the 2006 Asian Games – Men's 10 metre air pistol =

Men's 10 metre air pistol at the 2006 Asian Games
- Venue: Lusail Shooting Range
- Dates: 3 December 2006
- Competitors: 55 from 24 nations

Medalists
gold medal	Tan Zongliang	China
silver medal	Kim Jong-su	North Korea
bronze medal	Jin Jong-oh	South Korea

The men's 10 metre air pistol competition at the 2006 Asian Games in Doha, Qatar was held on 3 December at the Lusail Shooting Range.

== Schedule ==
All times are Arabia Standard Time (UTC+03:00)

Date	Time	Event
Sunday, 3 December 2006	08:00	Qualification
Sunday, 3 December 2006	14:15	Final

== Records ==
Prior to this competition, the existing world, Asian and Games records were as follows.

Qualification
World Record	Sergey Pyzhyanov (URS)	593	Munich, West Germany	13 October 1989
Asian Record	Wang Yifu (CHN)	590	Sydney, Australia	16 September 2000
Games Record	Tan Zongliang (CHN)	590	Busan, South Korea	3 October 2002
Final
World Record	Sergey Pyzhyanov (URS)	695.1	Munich, West Germany	13 October 1989
Asian Record	Tan Zongliang (CHN)	691.2	Munich, Germany	15 June 2003
Games Record	Tan Zongliang (CHN)	690.3	Busan, South Korea	3 October 2002

== Results ==
Legend

- DNS — Did not start

=== Qualification ===
Rank	Athlete	Series						Total	Notes
Rank	Athlete	1	2	3	4	5	6	Total	Notes
1	Tan Zongliang (CHN)	98	99	98	98	97	98	588	
2	Kim Jong-su (PRK)	96	100	98	95	99	96	584	
3	Jin Jong-oh (KOR)	95	98	98	99	97	96	583	
4	Lin Zhongzai (CHN)	96	96	97	98	99	96	582	
5	Lee Dae-myung (KOR)	99	97	97	97	97	95	582	
6	Rashid Yunusmetov (KAZ)	96	97	99	97	96	95	580	
7	Dilshod Mukhtarov (UZB)	97	94	98	95	97	98	579	
8	Susumu Kobayashi (JPN)	97	96	97	98	96	95	579	
9	Trần Quốc Cường (VIE)	94	96	99	97	97	95	578	
10	Nguyễn Mạnh Tường (VIE)	97	96	95	97	94	98	577	
11	Samaresh Jung (IND)	94	97	97	95	96	97	576	
12	Jakkrit Panichpatikum (THA)	98	94	99	95	96	94	576	
13	Hoàng Xuân Vinh (VIE)	97	92	96	98	95	97	575	
14	Vladimir Issachenko (KAZ)	94	95	97	97	96	96	575	
15	Pang Wei (CHN)	98	94	93	95	95	99	574	
16	Ryu Myong-yon (PRK)	94	95	95	98	96	96	574	
17	Kim Young-wook (KOR)	98	93	94	97	96	96	574	
18	Wong Fai (HKG)	98	95	96	96	93	96	574	
19	Teruyoshi Akiyama (JPN)	99	92	95	95	96	96	573	
20	Tomohiro Kida (JPN)	94	96	96	95	97	95	573	
21	Wu Kuo-yang (TPE)	94	96	95	97	94	95	571	
22	Deepak Sharma (IND)	96	96	92	97	96	94	571	
23	Kim Hyon-ung (PRK)	96	94	99	95	94	93	571	
24	Liao Chi-ming (TPE)	93	96	96	94	96	95	570	
25	Hadi Al-Qahtani (KSA)	93	92	95	95	93	100	568	
26	Lkhagvaagiin Undralbat (MGL)	98	93	91	95	97	94	568	
27	Sergey Babikov (TJK)	92	95	94	95	96	95	567	
28	Maung Kyu (MYA)	93	93	95	94	95	96	566	
29	Carolino Gonzales (PHI)	95	94	93	95	95	94	566	
30	Chang Yi-ning (TPE)	92	91	94	98	98	93	566	
31	Dhiyaa Abbas (IRQ)	94	97	95	92	96	92	566	
32	Mohsen Nasr Esfahani (IRI)	95	88	97	96	94	95	565	
33	Ronak Pandit (IND)	97	95	90	95	93	95	565	
34	Saran Wongehiaosiri (THA)	94	93	97	94	93	93	564	
35	Lev Berner (KAZ)	92	97	92	96	95	92	564	
36	Said Al-Hasani (OMA)	92	96	97	98	90	91	564	
37	Bhawin Tantinvachai (THA)	95	95	91	93	95	94	563	
38	Edirisinghe Senanayake (SRI)	94	96	90	95	92	95	562	
39	Hossein Hosseini (IRI)	91	94	95	96	95	91	562	
40	Khalid Ahmed Mohamed (BRN)	93	93	96	97	92	91	562	
41	Oleg Nabiev (TJK)	90	93	92	96	95	93	559	
42	Mohammed Al-Fakih (QAT)	93	88	95	93	92	97	558	
43	Wong Siu Lung (HKG)	92	94	88	94	94	96	558	
44	Ayedh Al-Malki (KSA)	92	94	93	91	94	94	558	
45	Ashban Sulaiman (BRN)	93	94	95	91	95	89	557	
46	Ebrahim Barkhordari (IRI)	92	94	92	94	89	95	556	
47	Abdulmajed Abdulkhaliq (BRN)	90	91	91	96	92	93	553	
48	Fahriddin Sirodjiddinov (TJK)	90	95	92	90	92	92	551	
49	Shaker Al-Burti (QAT)	93	90	90	88	92	97	550	
50	Abdulla Al-Naemi (QAT)	93	95	87	91	90	93	549	
51	Ivan Jumatin (KGZ)	93	87	93	89	93	92	547	
52	Saleh Al-Anazi (KSA)	92	90	93	90	87	91	543	
53	Chiu Kin Chong (MAC)	95	89	88	90	90	90	542	
54	Leong Chi Kin (MAC)	92	86	87	90	89	92	536	
—	Vladimir Grigoriev (KGZ)							DNS	

=== Final ===
Rank	Athlete	Qual.	Final											Total	S-off	Notes
Rank	Athlete	Qual.	1	2	3	4	5	6	7	8	9	10	Total	Total	S-off	Notes
1st place, gold medalist(s)	Tan Zongliang (CHN)	588	10.6	9.8	10.2	9.1	9.9	10.2	10.6	10.5	9.5	8.7	99.1	687.1		
2nd place, silver medalist(s)	Kim Jong-su (PRK)	584	10.2	10.0	10.8	10.5	9.2	10.2	10.2	10.1	9.3	10.3	100.8	684.8		
3rd place, bronze medalist(s)	Jin Jong-oh (KOR)	583	9.6	10.6	10.3	9.3	10.2	9.6	9.3	10.2	10.7	10.6	100.4	683.4		
4	Lee Dae-myung (KOR)	582	10.5	9.7	9.8	10.1	10.3	9.6	10.7	10.7	9.7	9.9	101.0	683.0		
5	Dilshod Mukhtarov (UZB)	579	9.1	10.6	9.7	10.3	10.4	10.7	10.4	10.7	10.4	10.2	102.5	681.5		
6	Susumu Kobayashi (JPN)	579	9.6	10.6	10.1	10.7	9.9	9.6	10.4	10.1	10.3	10.4	101.7	680.7		
7	Lin Zhongzai (CHN)	582	9.7	10.1	9.4	9.5	9.8	9.4	10.7	10.1	9.7	10.0	98.4	680.4		
8	Rashid Yunusmetov (KAZ)	580	10.1	10.4	9.6	10.2	10.6	10.0	10.1	10.0	8.9	10.4	100.3	680.3		
