= Diving at the 2010 Asian Games – Men's 10 metre platform =

Men's 10 metre platform at the 2010 Asian Games
- Venue: Aoti Aquatics Centre
- Date: 26 November 2010
- Competitors: 11 from 7 nations

Medalists
gold medal	Cao Yuan	China
silver medal	Huo Liang	China
bronze medal	Bryan Nickson Lomas	Malaysia

The men's 10 metre platform diving competition at the 2010 Asian Games in Guangzhou was held on 26 November at the Aoti Aquatics Centre.

== Schedule ==
All times are China Standard Time (UTC+08:00)

Date	Time	Event
Friday, 26 November 2010	12:30	Preliminary
Friday, 26 November 2010	18:30	Final

== Results ==
Legend

- DNF — Did not finish
- DNS — Did not start

=== Preliminary ===
Rank	Athlete	Dive						Total
Rank	Athlete	1	2	3	4	5	6	Total
1	Huo Liang (CHN)	81.60	82.25	90.75	91.80	92.50	97.20	536.10
2	Cao Yuan (CHN)	89.60	86.40	72.15	90.75	92.40	97.20	528.50
3	Bryan Nickson Lomas (MAS)	72.00	61.05	85.80	59.50	83.25	90.00	451.60
4	Kim Chon-man (PRK)	79.50	76.80	80.85	74.25	60.45	73.80	445.65
5	Sho Sakai (JPN)	63.00	75.20	64.50	62.40	69.30	79.20	413.60
6	Ooi Tze Liang (MAS)	72.00	63.45	70.50	64.35	64.35	76.80	411.45
7	Muhammad Nasrullah (INA)	60.00	65.60	62.40	69.30	67.65	62.70	387.65
8	Kazuki Murakami (JPN)	72.00	65.60	79.20	42.00	56.10	72.00	386.90
9	Kim Jin-yong (KOR)	72.00	75.20	59.40	24.75	73.60	72.00	376.95
10	Park Ji-ho (KOR)	67.50	62.40	67.65	28.05	73.60	67.20	366.40
—	Shahnam Nazarpour (IRI)	61.50	57.60	70.95	DNS			DNF

=== Final ===
Rank	Athlete	Dive						Total
Rank	Athlete	1	2	3	4	5	6	Total
1st place, gold medalist(s)	Cao Yuan (CHN)	91.20	95.40	101.75	72.60	99.00	97.20	557.15
2nd place, silver medalist(s)	Huo Liang (CHN)	89.60	101.50	89.10	91.80	85.10	95.40	552.50
3rd place, bronze medalist(s)	Bryan Nickson Lomas (MAS)	81.60	59.40	84.15	87.50	79.55	86.40	478.60
4	Kim Chon-man (PRK)	76.50	76.80	82.50	64.35	72.85	86.40	459.40
5	Sho Sakai (JPN)	64.40	75.20	73.50	68.80	89.10	74.25	445.25
6	Park Ji-ho (KOR)	72.00	73.60	75.90	69.30	65.60	72.00	428.40
7	Kazuki Murakami (JPN)	76.50	75.20	91.80	57.75	46.20	67.20	414.65
8	Ooi Tze Liang (MAS)	76.80	56.70	67.50	75.90	59.40	60.80	397.10
9	Kim Jin-yong (KOR)	70.50	59.20	29.70	49.50	61.20	70.40	340.50
10	Muhammad Nasrullah (INA)	54.00	41.60	60.80	49.50	39.60	59.40	304.90
