= Shooting at the 2006 Asian Games – Men's 50 metre pistol team =

Men's 50 metre pistol team at the 2006 Asian Games
- Venue: Lusail Shooting Range
- Dates: 5 December 2006
- Competitors: 39 from 13 nations

Medalists
gold medal	China; Pang Wei, Tan Zongliang, Xu Kun
silver medal	North Korea; Kim Hyon-ung, Kim Jong-su, Ryu Myong-yon
bronze medal	South Korea; Jin Jong-oh, Kim Young-wook, Lee Sang-do

The men's 50 metre pistol team competition at the 2006 Asian Games in Doha, Qatar was held on 5 December at the Lusail Shooting Range.

== Schedule ==
All times are Arabia Standard Time (UTC+03:00)

Date	Time	Event
Tuesday, 5 December 2006	08:00	Final

== Records ==
Prior to this competition, the existing world, Asian and Games records were as follows.

World Record	Romania	1719	Osijek, Yugoslavia	7 September 1985
Asian Record	China	1699	Lahti, Finland	8 July 2002
Games Record	China	1690	Busan, South Korea	2 October 2002

== Results ==
Rank	Team	Series						Total	Notes
Rank	Team	1	2	3	4	5	6	Total	Notes
1st place, gold medalist(s)	China (CHN)	280	284	282	282	278	276	1682	
	Pang Wei	91	95	94	94	92	90	556	
	Tan Zongliang	93	94	93	96	95	90	561	
	Xu Kun	96	95	95	92	91	96	565	
2nd place, silver medalist(s)	North Korea (PRK)	274	277	278	273	274	283	1659	
	Kim Hyon-ung	90	93	92	89	90	93	547	
	Kim Jong-su	91	90	96	92	94	99	562	
	Ryu Myong-yon	93	94	90	92	90	91	550	
3rd place, bronze medalist(s)	South Korea (KOR)	277	277	278	280	270	275	1657	
	Jin Jong-oh	91	97	97	94	93	91	563	
	Kim Young-wook	94	91	92	91	90	95	553	
	Lee Sang-do	92	89	89	95	87	89	541	
4	Kazakhstan (KAZ)	274	277	274	277	277	277	1656	
	Lev Berner	88	91	88	90	91	91	539	
	Vladimir Issachenko	92	93	91	93	90	94	553	
	Rashid Yunusmetov	94	93	95	94	96	92	564	
5	Vietnam (VIE)	281	279	272	276	274	270	1652	
	Hoàng Xuân Vinh	91	95	89	92	92	94	553	
	Nguyễn Mạnh Tường	96	95	92	91	90	87	551	
	Trần Quốc Cường	94	89	91	93	92	89	548	
6	Thailand (THA)	280	266	272	276	272	277	1643	
	Jakkrit Panichpatikum	95	92	90	95	93	94	559	
	Noppadon Sutiviruch	94	89	90	90	94	91	548	
	Saran Wongehiaosiri	91	85	92	91	85	92	536	
7	India (IND)	266	273	277	269	277	274	1636	
	Samaresh Jung	89	90	92	93	93	93	550	
	Zakir Khan	90	92	93	87	91	88	541	
	Bapu Vanjare	87	91	92	89	93	93	545	
8	Chinese Taipei (TPE)	265	268	269	276	270	275	1623	
	Chang Yi-ning	92	89	87	94	92	91	545	
	Liao Chi-ming	90	89	91	91	90	92	543	
	Wu Kuo-yang	83	90	91	91	88	92	535	
9	Saudi Arabia (KSA)	266	266	267	269	261	268	1597	
	Saleh Al-Anazi	90	86	87	87	85	88	523	
	Ayedh Al-Malki	86	91	83	94	87	95	536	
	Hadi Al-Qahtani	90	89	97	88	89	85	538	
10	Tajikistan (TJK)	258	271	267	267	259	267	1589	
	Sergey Babikov	86	92	92	92	84	92	538	
	Oleg Nabiev	87	88	90	90	89	85	529	
	Fahriddin Sirodjiddinov	85	91	85	85	86	90	522	
11	Iran (IRI)	263	265	261	258	253	273	1573	
	Ebrahim Barkhordari	92	86	89	89	85	90	531	
	Hossein Hosseini	82	94	83	81	77	94	511	
	Mohsen Nasr Esfahani	89	85	89	88	91	89	531	
12	Qatar (QAT)	256	266	269	257	253	264	1565	
	Shaker Al-Burti	88	85	89	81	90	86	519	
	Mohammed Al-Fakih	86	92	92	88	80	89	527	
	Mohamed Al-Kaabi	82	89	88	88	83	89	519	
13	Bahrain (BRN)	256	270	257	258	246	264	1551	
	Abdulhadi Al-Rawafjeh	83	93	78	81	73	87	495	
	Khalid Ahmed Mohamed	84	93	90	88	89	90	534	
	Ashban Sulaiman	89	84	89	89	84	87	522	
