= Shooting at the 2002 Asian Games – Men's 10 metre air pistol =

Air pistol competition held in Busan, South Korea

Men's 10 metre air pistol at the 2002 Asian Games
- Venue: Changwon International Shooting Range
- Dates: 3 October 2002
- Competitors: 48 from 19 nations

Medalists
gold medal	Tan Zongliang	China
silver medal	Kim Jong-su	North Korea
bronze medal	Jin Jong-oh	South Korea

The men's 10 metre air pistol competition at the 2002 Asian Games in Busan, South Korea was held on 3 October at the Changwon International Shooting Range.

== Schedule ==
All times are Korea Standard Time (UTC+09:00)

Date	Time	Event
Thursday, 3 October 2002	11:00	Qualification
Thursday, 3 October 2002	14:00	Final

== Records ==
Prior to this competition, the existing world, Asian and Games records were as follows.

Qualification
World Record	Sergey Pyzhyanov (URS)	593	Munich, West Germany	13 October 1989
Asian Record	Wang Yifu (CHN)	590	Sydney, Australia	16 September 2000
Games Record	Wang Yifu (CHN)	586	Hiroshima, Japan	14 October 1994
Final
World Record	Sergey Pyzhyanov (URS)	695.1	Munich, West Germany	13 October 1989
Asian Record	Tan Zongliang (CHN)	688.5	Atlanta, United States	20 May 2002
Games Record	Wang Yifu (CHN)	688.3	Hiroshima, Japan	14 October 1994

== Results ==
=== Qualification ===
Rank	Athlete	Series						Total	Notes
Rank	Athlete	1	2	3	4	5	6	Total	Notes
1	Tan Zongliang (CHN)	99	99	98	97	98	99	590	GR
2	Kim Jong-su (PRK)	98	96	98	98	99	99	588	
3	Jin Jong-oh (KOR)	96	97	99	98	97	97	584	
4	Wang Yifu (CHN)	94	96	96	98	99	98	581	
5	Rashid Yunusmetov (KAZ)	99	97	96	94	98	97	581	
6	Vladimir Guchsha (KAZ)	99	93	98	100	97	94	581	
7	Kim Hyon-ung (PRK)	97	99	97	97	98	93	581	
8	Xu Dan (CHN)	94	97	100	95	97	96	579	
9	Ryu Myong-yon (PRK)	95	99	98	97	95	95	579	
10	Kim Seon-il (KOR)	93	96	96	97	97	98	577	
10	Susumu Kobayashi (JPN)	99	96	98	92	97	95	577	
12	Dilshod Mukhtarov (UZB)	95	95	98	95	96	97	576	
12	Jakkrit Panichpatikum (THA)	98	97	94	96	97	94	576	
14	Vladimir Issachenko (KAZ)	97	96	93	95	96	98	575	
14	Nguyễn Mạnh Tường (VIE)	94	95	96	98	96	96	575	
14	Vladimir Grigoriev (KGZ)	95	97	96	96	96	95	575	
17	Enver Osmanov (UZB)	98	96	92	96	94	98	574	
17	Chang Yi-ning (TPE)	95	95	96	95	98	95	574	
19	Samaresh Jung (IND)	94	95	97	94	96	97	573	
19	Sergey Vozmishchev (UZB)	97	96	96	95	96	93	573	
21	Jaspal Rana (IND)	96	98	95	94	94	95	572	
21	Nopparat Kulton (THA)	97	96	95	97	95	92	572	
23	Trần Quốc Cường (VIE)	98	93	96	94	93	97	571	
23	Phạm Cao Sơn (VIE)	96	93	96	95	96	95	571	
23	Yuri Melentiev (KGZ)	96	97	92	96	96	94	571	
26	Sergey Babikov (TJK)	96	94	94	95	97	94	570	
27	Ved Prakash Pilaniya (IND)	91	96	96	95	95	96	569	
28	Lkhagvaagiin Undralbat (MGL)	96	89	98	91	96	98	568	
29	Opas Ruengpanyawut (THA)	95	95	89	96	95	97	567	
29	Dmitru Kuznetsov (KGZ)	94	97	95	96	90	95	567	
31	Irshad Ali (PAK)	96	97	94	91	95	92	565	
31	Song Dong-woo (KOR)	93	95	93	98	95	91	565	
33	Masaru Nakashige (JPN)	94	96	92	94	93	95	564	
34	Mustaqeem Shah (PAK)	93	97	92	91	93	96	562	
34	Shoichi Uenosono (JPN)	94	93	94	92	95	94	562	
36	Zaid Al-Hanai (OMA)	95	92	94	92	93	94	560	
37	Khaled Al-Subaie (KUW)	91	92	93	95	95	93	559	
37	Ghanim Al-Naemi (QAT)	93	95	92	94	93	92	559	
39	Oleg Nabiev (TJK)	92	91	96	93	91	95	558	
40	Said Al-Hasani (OMA)	92	92	94	91	93	95	557	
40	Saleh Al-Enezi (KUW)	91	97	94	91	91	93	557	
42	Zain Al-Sinani (QAT)	92	94	96	94	89	91	556	
43	Khalid Ahmed Mohamed (BRN)	95	93	93	92	93	89	555	
44	Zahid Ali (PAK)	91	89	91	92	94	94	551	
45	Hamed Al-Fulaiti (OMA)	93	93	89	92	91	92	550	
46	Dawood Al-Shemmari (KUW)	92	82	95	91	93	96	549	
47	Jagat Tamang (NEP)	86	86	91	93	86	92	534	
48	Adel Al-Asad (BRN)	88	88	81	91	91	86	525	

=== Final ===
Rank	Athlete	Qual.	Final											Total	S-off	Notes
Rank	Athlete	Qual.	1	2	3	4	5	6	7	8	9	10	Total	Total	S-off	Notes
1st place, gold medalist(s)	Tan Zongliang (CHN)	590	9.8	10.8	9.7	10.6	9.2	10.3	10.2	10.0	9.5	10.2	100.3	690.3		AR
2nd place, silver medalist(s)	Kim Jong-su (PRK)	588	9.9	9.3	9.9	9.9	10.9	9.9	10.8	10.8	10.7	8.6	100.7	688.7		
3rd place, bronze medalist(s)	Jin Jong-oh (KOR)	584	9.8	10.5	9.7	10.3	10.8	9.5	10.3	9.8	10.4	9.3	100.4	684.4		
4	Vladimir Guchsha (KAZ)	581	10.4	10.5	9.7	10.0	9.8	10.0	10.1	10.6	9.4	10.5	101.0	682.0		
5	Kim Hyon-ung (PRK)	581	10.4	10.6	9.0	9.0	9.9	10.3	9.7	10.5	10.1	10.5	100.0	681.0		
6	Rashid Yunusmetov (KAZ)	581	10.6	8.7	9.9	10.3	9.8	10.6	10.3	10.0	9.1	10.5	99.8	680.8		
7	Wang Yifu (CHN)	581	9.6	10.7	10.6	9.3	10.1	9.8	9.7	10.1	10.4	9.4	99.7	680.7		
8	Xu Dan (CHN)	579	8.9	10.6	9.2	9.7	9.8	10.6	9.3	10.6	10.3	9.6	98.6	677.6		
