= Diving at the 2006 Asian Games – Men's 10 metre platform =

Men's 10 metre platform at the 2006 Asian Games
- Venue: Hamad Aquatic Centre
- Date: 14 December 2006
- Competitors: 13 from 8 nations

Medalists
gold medal	Lin Yue	China
silver medal	Zhou Lüxin	China
bronze medal	Kim Chon-man	North Korea

The men's 10 metre platform diving competition at the 2006 Asian Games in Doha was held on 14 December at the Hamad Aquatic Centre.

== Schedule ==
All times are Arabia Standard Time (UTC+03:00)

Date	Time	Event
Thursday, 14 December 2006	10:00	Preliminary
Thursday, 14 December 2006	18:00	Final

== Results ==
=== Preliminary ===
Rank	Athlete	Dive						Total
Rank	Athlete	1	2	3	4	5	6	Total
1	Lin Yue (CHN)	79.50	80.00	86.40	82.50	86.70	95.00	510.10
2	Zhou Lüxin (CHN)	73.50	73.10	89.25	86.70	84.80	88.20	495.55
3	Kim Jin-yong (KOR)	67.50	78.40	69.30	66.30	63.55	78.20	423.25
4	Kim Chon-man (PRK)	73.50	78.40	70.95	35.70	66.65	91.20	416.40
5	Rexel Fabriga (PHI)	66.00	60.90	60.90	65.60	72.00	85.00	410.40
6	Oh Yi-taek (KOR)	67.50	68.80	56.10	68.40	52.70	69.70	383.20
7	Bryan Nickson Lomas (MAS)	67.50	57.60	45.90	49.50	69.75	86.70	376.95
8	Kazuki Murakami (JPN)	60.00	62.40	28.80	81.60	58.90	69.70	361.40
9	Ri Jong-nam (PRK)	76.80	22.75	60.75	67.65	68.80	62.70	359.45
10	Kotaro Miyamoto (JPN)	64.40	64.50	66.70	42.90	38.40	78.20	355.10
11	Jaime Asok (PHI)	63.00	49.30	55.10	60.80	49.60	73.10	350.90
12	Sareerapat Pimsamsee (THA)	37.80	35.15	48.00	63.00	73.60	66.30	323.85
13	Mohammed Shewaiter (QAT)	57.20	40.50	62.10	59.40	16.00	34.80	270.00

=== Final ===
Rank	Athlete	Dive						Total
Rank	Athlete	1	2	3	4	5	6	Total
1st place, gold medalist(s)	Lin Yue (CHN)	81.00	86.40	95.40	85.80	100.30	102.60	551.50
2nd place, silver medalist(s)	Zhou Lüxin (CHN)	81.00	86.70	94.50	86.70	89.60	95.40	533.90
3rd place, bronze medalist(s)	Kim Chon-man (PRK)	76.50	83.20	80.85	57.80	74.40	83.60	456.35
4	Kazuki Murakami (JPN)	63.00	70.40	90.00	85.00	68.20	59.50	436.10
5	Ri Jong-nam (PRK)	81.60	75.25	58.05	56.10	73.60	76.00	420.60
6	Rexel Fabriga (PHI)	61.50	62.35	56.55	81.60	72.00	85.00	419.00
7	Kotaro Miyamoto (JPN)	63.00	73.50	58.00	61.05	75.20	81.60	412.35
8	Oh Yi-taek (KOR)	67.50	72.00	45.90	75.60	68.20	79.90	409.10
9	Bryan Nickson Lomas (MAS)	73.50	67.20	67.50	49.50	65.10	71.40	394.20
10	Jaime Asok (PHI)	57.00	60.90	55.10	56.00	73.60	78.20	380.80
11	Kim Jin-yong (KOR)	64.50	78.40	49.50	32.30	66.65	71.40	362.75
12	Sareerapat Pimsamsee (THA)	40.50	39.90	51.00	57.00	62.40	61.20	312.00
