= Diving at the 2010 Asian Games – Men's synchronized 10 metre platform =

Men's synchronized 10 metre platform at the 2010 Asian Games
- Venue: Aoti Aquatics Centre
- Date: 22 November 2010
- Competitors: 16 from 8 nations

Medalists
gold medal	Yang Liguang; Zhou Lüxin	China
silver medal	Bryan Nickson Lomas; Ooi Tze Liang	Malaysia
bronze medal	Kim Chon-man; So Myong-hyok	North Korea

The men's synchronised 10 metre platform diving competition at the 2010 Asian Games in Guangzhou was held on 22 November at the Aoti Aquatics Centre.

== Schedule ==
All times are China Standard Time (UTC+08:00)

Date	Time	Event
Monday, 22 November 2010	17:00	Final

== Results ==
Legend

- DNF — Did not finish
- DNS — Did not start

Rank	Team	Dive						Total
Rank	Team	1	2	3	4	5	6	Total
1st place, gold medalist(s)	China (CHN); Yang Liguang; Zhou Lüxin	57.60	58.20	84.48	94.05	88.56	103.68	486.57
2nd place, silver medalist(s)	Malaysia (MAS); Bryan Nickson Lomas; Ooi Tze Liang	49.80	51.60	75.60	74.25	76.23	79.68	407.16
3rd place, bronze medalist(s)	North Korea (PRK); Kim Chon-man; So Myong-hyok	49.20	51.00	72.90	77.76	69.30	73.92	394.08
4	South Korea (KOR); Kim Jin-yong; Oh Yi-taek	52.20	51.00	74.88	74.70	65.28	71.28	389.34
5	Japan (JPN); Kazuki Murakami; Yu Okamoto	45.60	48.00	77.40	74.88	71.04	71.28	388.20
6	Iran (IRI); Shahnam Nazarpour; Mojtaba Valipour	45.60	43.80	69.60	67.50	62.16	69.12	357.78
7	Indonesia (INA); Muhammad Nasrullah; Husaini Noor	46.20	43.80	59.40	69.12	32.67	64.32	315.51
—	Philippines (PHI); Jaime Asok; Rexel Fabriga	48.00	39.60	54.90	DNS			DNF
