= Diving at the 2006 Asian Games – Men's synchronized 10 metre platform =

Men's synchronized 10 metre platform at the 2006 Asian Games
- Venue: Hamad Aquatic Centre
- Date: 11 December 2006
- Competitors: 10 from 5 nations

Medalists
gold medal	Lin Yue; Huo Liang	China
silver medal	Ri Jong-nam; Kim Chon-man	North Korea
bronze medal	Kwon Kyung-min; Cho Kwan-hoon	South Korea

The men's synchronised 10 metre platform diving competition at the 2006 Asian Games in Doha was held on 11 December at the Hamad Aquatic Centre.

== Schedule ==
All times are Arabia Standard Time (UTC+03:00)

Date	Time	Event
Monday, 11 December 2006	18:55	Final

== Results ==
Rank	Team	Dive						Total
Rank	Team	1	2	3	4	5	6	Total
1st place, gold medalist(s)	China (CHN); Lin Yue; Huo Liang	52.80	55.80	91.80	86.40	95.88	91.20	473.88
2nd place, silver medalist(s)	North Korea (PRK); Ri Jong-nam; Kim Chon-man	52.20	51.60	87.72	80.64	75.24	85.50	432.90
3rd place, bronze medalist(s)	South Korea (KOR); Kwon Kyung-min; Cho Kwan-hoon	50.40	47.40	72.90	78.72	86.70	94.62	430.74
4	Philippines (PHI); Rexel Fabriga; Jaime Asok	48.00	46.80	65.52	69.30	75.84	82.62	388.08
5	Japan (JPN); Kotaro Miyamoto; Kazuki Murakami	48.60	49.80	68.04	66.60	71.34	82.62	387.00
