= Shooting at the 2006 Asian Games – Women's skeet team =

Women's skeet team at the 2006 Asian Games
- Venue: Lusail Shooting Range
- Dates: 7 December 2006
- Competitors: 12 from 4 nations

Medalists
gold medal	China; Wei Ning, Yu Xiumin, Zhang Donglian
silver medal	North Korea; Kim Myong-hwa, Pak Jong-ran, Pak Kum-hui
bronze medal	South Korea; Kim Yeun-hee, Kwak Yu-hyun, Son Hye-kyoung

The women's skeet team competition at the 2006 Asian Games in Doha, Qatar was held on 7 December at the Lusail Shooting Range.

== Schedule ==
All times are Arabia Standard Time (UTC+03:00)

Date	Time	Event
Thursday, 7 December 2006	08:30	Final

== Records ==
Prior to this competition, the existing world, Asian and Games records were as follows.

World Record	United States	211	Zagreb, Croatia	5 August 2006
Asian Record	China	205	Zagreb, Croatia	5 August 2006
Games Record	—	—	—	—

== Results ==
Rank	Team	Round			Total	Notes
Rank	Team	1	2	3	Total	Notes
1st place, gold medalist(s)	China (CHN)	70	68	69	207	AR
	Wei Ning	24	23	24	71	
	Yu Xiumin	24	23	22	69	
	Zhang Donglian	22	22	23	67	
2nd place, silver medalist(s)	North Korea (PRK)	66	68	64	198	
	Kim Myong-hwa	23	24	24	71	
	Pak Jong-ran	23	21	23	67	
	Pak Kum-hui	20	23	17	60	
3rd place, bronze medalist(s)	South Korea (KOR)	64	63	66	193	
	Kim Yeun-hee	22	22	22	66	
	Kwak Yu-hyun	20	21	24	65	
	Son Hye-kyoung	22	20	20	62	
4	Qatar (QAT)	40	42	33	115	
	Sameera Al-Mannai	18	18	13	49	
	Deena Al-Tebaishi	13	14	9	36	
	Sada Mehawesh	9	10	11	30	
