= Shooting at the 2008 Summer Olympics – Men's 50 metre pistol =

Men's 50 metre pistol at the Games of the XXIX Olympiad
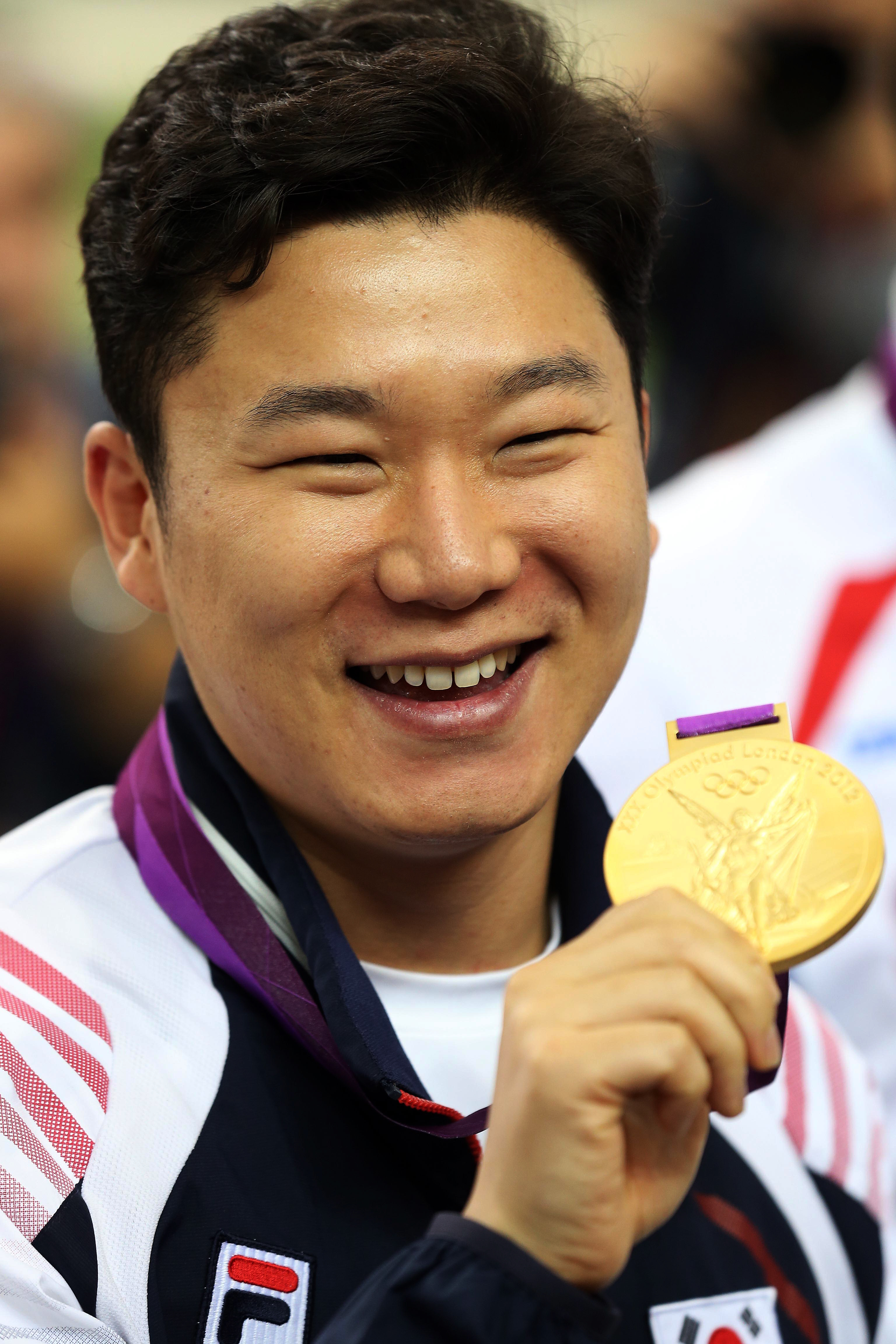
- Jin Jong-oh (2012)
- Venue: Beijing Shooting Range Hall
- Date: August 12, 2008
- Competitors: 45 from 32 nations
- Winning score: 660.4

Medalists
| 1st place, gold medalist(s) | | Jin Jong-oh; South Korea |
| 2nd place, silver medalist(s) | | Tan Zongliang; China |
| 3rd place, bronze medalist(s) | | Vladimir Isakov; Russia |

The men's ISSF 50 meter pistol event at the 2008 Olympic Games took place on August 12 at the Beijing Shooting Range Hall. There were 45 competitors from 32 nations. The event was won by Jin Jong-oh of South Korea, the first of his three consecutive victories in the free pistol. It was his second medal, after taking silver in 2004; he was the 10th man to win multiple medals in the event (he would later become the fourth to win three and second to win four).

Kim Jong-su of North Korea originally won the silver medal, but was disqualified after he tested positive for propranolol. This moved Tan Zongliang of China from bronze to silver and gave Vladimir Isakov of Russia the bronze. It was China's first medal in the event since 1992; Russia was on the free pistol podium for the third time in four Games.

== Background ==
This was the 22nd appearance of the ISSF 50 meter pistol event. The event was held at every Summer Olympics from 1896 to 1920 (except 1904, when no shooting events were held) and from 1936 to 2016; it was open to women from 1968 to 1980. 1896 and 1908 were the only Games in which the distance was not 50 metres; the former used 30 metres and the latter 50 yards.

Five of the eight finalists from the 2004 Games returned: gold medalist Mikhail Nestruyev of Russia, silver medalist Jin Jong-oh of South Korea, bronze medalist Kim Jong-su of North Korea, fourth-place finisher Norayr Bakhtamyan of Armenia, and seventh-place finisher (and 2000 gold medalist and 1992 finalist) Tanyu Kiryakov of Bulgaria. Tan Zongliang of China was the two-time reigning (2002 and 2006) world champion, with Vigilio Fait of Italy the 2006 runner-up and Vladimir Isakov of Russia third.

Montenegro, Serbia, Sri Lanka, and Tajikistan each made their debut in the event. The United States made its 20th appearance, most of any nation, having missed only the 1900 event and the boycotted 1980 Games.

Jin used a Morini CM84E.

== Qualification ==
Each National Olympic Committee (NOC) could enter up to two shooters if the NOC earned enough quota sports or had enough crossover-qualified shooters. To compete, a shooter needed a quota spot and to achieve a Minimum Qualification Score (MQS). Once a shooter was using a quota spot in any shooting event, they could enter any other shooting event for which they had achieved the MQS as well (a crossover qualification). There were 23 quota spots used for the free pistol: 4 at the 2005 World Cup events, 4 at the 2006 World Cup events, 4 at the 2006 World Championship, 4 at the 2007 World Cup events, 2 each at the 2007 European Championships and 2007 Asian Championships, and 1 each at the 2005 American Continental Championships, 2007 Pan American Games, and 2007 Oceania Champions. One additional place came from the exchange system, and one place from re-allocation. There were also 19 shooters who double-started into the free pistol, primarily from the 10 metre air pistol event.

== Competition format ==
The competition featured two rounds, qualifying and final. The qualifying round was the same as the previous competitions: each shooter fired 60 shots, in 6 series of 10 shots each, at a distance of 50 metres. The target was round, 50 centimetres in diameter, with 10 scoring rings. Scoring for each shot was up to 10 points, in increments of 1 point. The maximum score possible was 600 points. The top 8 shooters advanced to a final. They shot an additional series of 10 shots, with the score added to their qualifying round score to give a 70-shot total. The 1996 competition had added decimal scoring to the final; shots could score up to 10.9 for the final. The total maximum was therefore 709.0. Ties were broken first by final round score, then a single-shot shoot-off. Any pistol was permitted.

== Records ==
The existing world and Olympic records were as follows.

Qualifying (60 shots)
| World record | Aleksandr Melentiev (URS) | 581 | Moscow, Soviet Union | 20 July 1980 |
| Olympic record | Aleksandr Melentiev (URS) | 581 | Moscow, Soviet Union | 20 July 1980 |

Final (70 shots)
| World record | William Demarest (USA) | 676.2 (577+99.2) | Milan, Italy | 4 June 2000 |
| Olympic record | Boris Kokorev (RUS) | 666.4 (570+96.4) | Atlanta, United States | 23 July 1996 |

No new world or Olympics records were set during the competition.

== Schedule ==
| Date | Time | Round |
|---|---|---|
| Tuesday, 12 August 2008 | 9:00; 12:00 | Qualifying; Final |

== Results ==
=== Qualifying ===
Kim's results were wiped out when he was disqualified a few days after the event.

| Rank | Shooter | Nation | 1 | 2 | 3 | 4 | 5 | 6 | Total | Notes |
|---|---|---|---|---|---|---|---|---|---|---|
| 1 | Tan Zongliang | China | 96 | 94 | 93 | 96 | 90 | 96 | 565 | Q |
| ~~2~~ | Kim Jong-su | North Korea | ~~94~~ | ~~92~~ | ~~95~~ | ~~94~~ | ~~94~~ | ~~94~~ | ~~563~~ | Q, DPG |
| 3 | Oleg Omelchuk | Ukraine | 94 | 96 | 94 | 93 | 93 | 93 | 563 | Q |
| 4 | Pavol Kopp | Slovakia | 99 | 92 | 89 | 93 | 98 | 92 | 563 | Q |
| 5 | Vladimir Isakov | Russia | 95 | 93 | 96 | 94 | 93 | 92 | 563 | Q |
| 6 | Jin Jong-oh | South Korea | 91 | 94 | 94 | 97 | 97 | 90 | 563 | Q |
| 7 | Tanyu Kiryakov | Bulgaria | 90 | 93 | 95 | 94 | 95 | 95 | 562 | Q |
| 8 | Damir Mikec | Serbia | 92 | 93 | 94 | 95 | 95 | 90 | 559 | Q |
| 9 | Tomoyuki Matsuda | Japan | 92 | 94 | 91 | 94 | 93 | 94 | 558 | |
| 10 | Susumu Kobayashi | Japan | 91 | 95 | 94 | 92 | 93 | 93 | 558 | |
| 11 | Kanstantsin Lukashyk | Belarus | 96 | 95 | 92 | 92 | 92 | 91 | 558 | |
| 12 | Yury Dauhapolau | Belarus | 93 | 94 | 95 | 95 | 93 | 88 | 558 | |
| 13 | Hans-Jörg Meyer | Germany | 93 | 91 | 88 | 95 | 96 | 94 | 557 | |
| 14 | Daryl Szarenski | United States | 91 | 94 | 88 | 94 | 92 | 96 | 555 | |
| 15 | Norayr Bakhtamyan | Armenia | 93 | 91 | 92 | 93 | 93 | 93 | 555 | |
| 16 | Lin Zhongzai | China | 92 | 92 | 94 | 93 | 92 | 92 | 555 | |
| 17 | Rashid Yunusmetov | Kazakhstan | 91 | 96 | 92 | 90 | 96 | 90 | 555 | |
| 18 | Júlio Almeida | Brazil | 96 | 91 | 94 | 93 | 89 | 91 | 554 | |
| 19 | Francesco Bruno | Italy | 92 | 95 | 95 | 92 | 92 | 88 | 554 | |
| 20 | Ivan Rybovalov | Ukraine | 89 | 91 | 91 | 96 | 91 | 95 | 553 | |
| 21 | Jason Turner | United States | 91 | 93 | 92 | 93 | 90 | 94 | 553 | |
| 22 | Kai Jahnsson | Finland | 92 | 94 | 93 | 90 | 92 | 92 | 553 | |
| 23 | Yusuf Dikeç | Turkey | 94 | 94 | 92 | 93 | 90 | 89 | 552 | |
| 24 | Mikhail Nestruyev | Russia | 98 | 88 | 93 | 90 | 95 | 88 | 552 | |
| 25 | Walter Lapeyre | France | 94 | 94 | 93 | 96 | 87 | 88 | 552 | |
| 26 | Lee Dae-myung | South Korea | 90 | 90 | 90 | 91 | 96 | 94 | 551 | |
| 27 | Ryu Myong-yon | North Korea | 87 | 93 | 92 | 93 | 92 | 94 | 551 | |
| 28 | Vigilio Fait | Italy | 92 | 90 | 89 | 91 | 96 | 93 | 551 | |
| 29 | Florian Schmidt | Germany | 93 | 91 | 91 | 89 | 91 | 94 | 549 | |
| 30 | Jakkrit Panichpatikum | Thailand | 91 | 93 | 88 | 93 | 91 | 93 | 549 | |
| 31 | Dilshod Mukhtarov | Uzbekistan | 93 | 92 | 90 | 90 | 93 | 91 | 549 | |
| 32 | Samy Abdel Razek | Egypt | 91 | 92 | 97 | 87 | 91 | 91 | 549 | |
| 33 | João Costa | Portugal | 93 | 95 | 91 | 95 | 88 | 87 | 549 | |
| 34 | Franck Dumoulin | France | 90 | 89 | 96 | 94 | 88 | 91 | 548 | |
| 35 | David Moore | Australia | 89 | 85 | 92 | 92 | 95 | 93 | 546 | |
| 36 | Edirisinghe Senanayake | Sri Lanka | 89 | 93 | 88 | 88 | 94 | 93 | 545 | |
| 37 | Martin Tenk | Czech Republic | 90 | 91 | 90 | 91 | 93 | 89 | 544 | |
| 38 | Nguyễn Mạnh Tường | Vietnam | 92 | 89 | 89 | 91 | 93 | 89 | 543 | |
| 39 | Wojciech Knapik | Poland | 95 | 86 | 95 | 91 | 89 | 87 | 543 | |
| 40 | Christoph Schmid | Switzerland | 94 | 86 | 91 | 91 | 92 | 88 | 542 | |
| 41 | Daniel Repacholi | Australia | 89 | 93 | 89 | 81 | 94 | 94 | 540 | |
| 42 | Samaresh Jung | India | 88 | 92 | 91 | 86 | 90 | 93 | 540 | |
| 43 | Sergey Babikov | Tajikistan | 90 | 83 | 93 | 92 | 90 | 92 | 540 | |
| 44 | Stênio Yamamoto | Brazil | 91 | 89 | 86 | 92 | 91 | 89 | 538 | |
| 45 | Nikola Šaranović | Montenegro | 89 | 88 | 87 | 90 | 93 | 88 | 535 | |

=== Final ===
Kim initially placed second, but his results were wiped out when he was disqualified a few days after the event.

| Rank | Shooter | Nation | Qualifying | Final | | | | | | | | | | | Total | Shoot-off | Notes |
| Rank | Shooter | Nation | Qualifying | 1 | 2 | 3 | 4 | 5 | 6 | 7 | 8 | 9 | 10 | Total | Total | Shoot-off | Notes |
|---|---|---|---|---|---|---|---|---|---|---|---|---|---|---|---|---|---|
| 1st place, gold medalist(s) | Jin Jong-oh | South Korea | 563 | 10.3 | 10.5 | 9.8 | 8.5 | 10.4 | 10.3 | 9.7 | 9.9 | 9.8 | 8.2 | 97.4 | 660.4 | | |
| 2nd place, silver medalist(s) | Tan Zongliang | China | 565 | 7.9 | 9.2 | 10.2 | 8.1 | 10.6 | 9.8 | 10.2 | 9.6 | 9.7 | 9.2 | 94.5 | 659.5 | | |
| 3rd place, bronze medalist(s) | Vladimir Isakov | Russia | 563 | 87 | 84 | 98 | 97 | 10.5 | 95 | 10.3 | 95 | 91 | 10.4 | 95.9 | 658.9 | 9.1 | |
| 4 | Oleg Omelchuk | Ukraine | 563 | 8.2 | 10.5 | 10.1 | 10.5 | 9.3 | 10.1 | 9.6 | 8.3 | 10.3 | 9.0 | 95.9 | 658.9 | 6.5 | |
| 5 | Pavol Kopp | Slovakia | 563 | 9.4 | 10.3 | 10.0 | 10.0 | 8.7 | 8.3 | 10.2 | 8.7 | 10.0 | 9.0 | 94.6 | 657.6 | | |
| 6 | Tanyu Kiryakov | Bulgaria | 562 | 9.3 | 9.1 | 9.8 | 10.4 | 9.8 | 10.7 | 8.7 | 9.3 | 8.9 | 8.8 | 94.8 | 656.8 | | |
| 7 | Damir Mikec | Serbia | 559 | 9.9 | 10.6 | 8.7 | 9.9 | 8.7 | 9.8 | 10.5 | 8.2 | 10.2 | 10.3 | 96.8 | 655.8 | | |
| — | Kim Jong-su | North Korea | ~~563~~ | ~~9.3~~ | ~~10.0~~ | ~~9.0~~ | ~~9.0~~ | ~~10.7~~ | ~~10.2~~ | ~~9.4~~ | ~~9.2~~ | ~~9.9~~ | ~~10.5~~ | ~~97.2~~ | ~~660.2~~ | | DPG |
