= Shooting at the 2006 Asian Games – Women's skeet =

Women's skeet at the 2006 Asian Games
- Venue: Lusail Shooting Range
- Dates: 7 December 2006
- Competitors: 16 from 8 nations

Medalists
gold medal	Kim Myong-hwa	North Korea
silver medal	Wei Ning	China
bronze medal	Yu Xiumin	China

The women's skeet competition at the 2006 Asian Games in Doha, Qatar was held on 7 December at the Lusail Shooting Range.

== Schedule ==
All times are Arabia Standard Time (UTC+03:00)

Date	Time	Event
Thursday, 7 December 2006	08:30	Qualification
Thursday, 7 December 2006	15:00	Final

== Records ==
Prior to this competition, the existing world, Asian and Games records were as follows.

Qualification
World Record	Elena Little (GBR)	74	Belgrade, Serbia & Montenegro	17 July 2005
Asian Record	Shi Hongyan (CHN)	74	Qingyuan, China	9 April 2006
Games Record	—	—	—	—
Final
World Record	Shi Hongyan (CHN)	97	Qingyuan, China	9 April 2006
Asian Record	Shi Hongyan (CHN)	97	Qingyuan, China	9 April 2006
Games Record	—	—	—	—

== Results ==
=== Qualification ===
Rank	Athlete	Round			Total	S-off	Notes
Rank	Athlete	1	2	3	Total	S-off	Notes
1	Kim Myong-hwa (PRK)	23	24	24	71		GR
2	Wei Ning (CHN)	24	23	24	71		GR
3	Sutiya Jiewchaloemmit (THA)	21	25	24	70		
4	Madoka Inami (JPN)	22	25	22	69		
5	Yu Xiumin (CHN)	24	23	22	69		
6	Zhang Donglian (CHN)	22	22	23	67	+4	
7	Pak Jong-ran (PRK)	23	21	23	67	+2	
8	Kim Yeun-hee (KOR)	22	22	22	66		
9	Kwak Yu-hyun (KOR)	20	21	24	65		
10	Huang Shih-ting (TPE)	20	23	20	63		
11	Son Hye-kyoung (KOR)	22	20	20	62		
12	Pak Kum-hui (PRK)	20	23	17	60		
13	Nguyễn Thị Đức Hạnh (VIE)	19	20	19	58		
14	Sameera Al-Mannai (QAT)	18	18	13	49		
15	Deena Al-Tebaishi (QAT)	13	14	9	36		
16	Sada Mehawesh (QAT)	9	10	11	30		

=== Final ===
Rank	Athlete	Qual.	Final	Total	S-off	Notes
1st place, gold medalist(s)	Kim Myong-hwa (PRK)	71	22	93	+4	GR
2nd place, silver medalist(s)	Wei Ning (CHN)	71	22	93	+3	GR
3rd place, bronze medalist(s)	Yu Xiumin (CHN)	69	23	92	+4	
4	Sutiya Jiewchaloemmit (THA)	70	22	92	+3	
5	Madoka Inami (JPN)	69	20	89	+6	
6	Zhang Donglian (CHN)	67	22	89	+5	
