= Diving at the 2010 Asian Games – Men's synchronized 3 metre springboard =

Men's synchronized 3 metre springboard at the 2010 Asian Games
- Venue: Aoti Aquatics Centre
- Date: 23 November 2010
- Competitors: 16 from 8 nations

Medalists
gold medal	Luo Yutong; Qin Kai	China
silver medal	Bryan Nickson Lomas; Yeoh Ken Nee	Malaysia
bronze medal	Park Ji-ho; Son Seong-cheol	South Korea

The men's synchronised 3 metre springboard diving competition at the 2010 Asian Games in Guangzhou was held on 23 November at the Aoti Aquatics Centre.

== Schedule ==
All times are China Standard Time (UTC+08:00)

Date	Time	Event
Tuesday, 23 November 2010	17:00	Final

== Results ==
Rank	Team	Dive						Total
Rank	Team	1	2	3	4	5	6	Total
1st place, gold medalist(s)	China (CHN); Luo Yutong; Qin Kai	53.40	55.80	81.84	87.72	89.76	91.08	459.60
2nd place, silver medalist(s)	Malaysia (MAS); Bryan Nickson Lomas; Yeoh Ken Nee	52.20	52.80	70.68	70.38	78.21	80.58	404.85
3rd place, bronze medalist(s)	South Korea (KOR); Park Ji-ho; Son Seong-cheol	49.80	51.60	70.20	66.60	76.26	73.80	388.26
4	Japan (JPN); Yu Okamoto; Sho Sakai	47.40	51.60	66.60	71.61	70.20	70.29	377.70
5	Philippines (PHI); Niño Carog; Zardo Domenios	45.60	44.40	63.90	63.24	63.90	60.30	341.34
6	Iran (IRI); Ghaem Mirabian; Mojtaba Valipour	46.20	42.60	62.10	68.82	60.30	58.50	338.52
7	Hong Kong (HKG); Foo Chuen Li; Jason Poon	47.40	24.60	66.03	58.50	64.80	63.90	325.23
8	Athletes from Kuwait (IOC); Abdulrahman Abbas; Rashid Al-Harbi	43.80	30.00	51.84	50.40	60.48	52.20	288.72
