= Diving at the 2006 Asian Games – Women's 10 metre platform =

Women's 10 metre platform at the 2006 Asian Games
- Venue: Hamad Aquatic Centre
- Date: 14 December 2006
- Competitors: 6 from 3 nations

Medalists
gold medal	Wang Xin	China
silver medal	Chen Ruolin	China
bronze medal	Hong In-sun	North Korea

The women's 10 metre platform diving competition at the 2006 Asian Games in Doha was held on 14 December at the Hamad Aquatic Centre.

== Schedule ==
All times are Arabia Standard Time (UTC+03:00)

Date	Time	Event
Thursday, 14 December 2006	19:15	Final

== Results ==
Rank	Athlete	Dive					Total
Rank	Athlete	1	2	3	4	5	Total
1st place, gold medalist(s)	Wang Xin (CHN)	81.00	91.20	89.60	77.55	79.90	419.25
2nd place, silver medalist(s)	Chen Ruolin (CHN)	81.00	81.60	91.20	75.90	88.40	418.10
3rd place, bronze medalist(s)	Hong In-sun (PRK)	67.50	67.20	69.30	75.20	74.80	354.00
4	Risa Asada (JPN)	68.60	75.00	68.15	62.10	79.90	353.75
5	Mai Nakagawa (JPN)	63.00	52.20	72.00	56.55	81.60	325.35
6	Choe Kum-hui (PRK)	61.50	62.40	46.20	51.15	79.90	301.15
