= Diving at the 2006 Asian Games – Men's 3 metre springboard =

Men's 3 metre springboard at the 2006 Asian Games
- Venue: Hamad Aquatic Centre
- Date: 13 December 2006
- Competitors: 17 from 10 nations

Medalists
gold medal	He Chong	China
silver medal	Luo Yutong	China
bronze medal	Ken Terauchi	Japan

The men's 3 metre springboard diving competition at the 2006 Asian Games in Doha was held on 13 December at the Hamad Aquatic Centre.

== Schedule ==
All times are Arabia Standard Time (UTC+03:00)

Date	Time	Event
Wednesday, 13 December 2006	11:15	Preliminary
Wednesday, 13 December 2006	19:15	Final

== Results ==
=== Preliminary ===
Rank	Athlete	Dive						Total
Rank	Athlete	1	2	3	4	5	6	Total
1	He Chong (CHN)	80.60	86.70	75.00	84.00	92.75	98.80	517.85
2	Luo Yutong (CHN)	77.50	86.70	81.60	79.50	82.25	94.50	502.05
3	Ken Terauchi (JPN)	73.50	72.00	69.00	81.60	79.05	84.00	459.15
4	Yeoh Ken Nee (MAS)	67.50	72.85	57.00	52.50	84.00	69.70	403.55
5	Cho Kwan-hoon (KOR)	66.65	73.10	64.50	66.00	72.00	57.75	400.00
6	Khairul Safwan Mansur (MAS)	69.00	69.75	56.10	75.00	61.50	67.50	398.85
7	Yu Okamoto (JPN)	69.00	69.00	74.40	66.00	74.80	38.50	391.70
8	Zardo Domenios (PHI)	63.00	72.85	60.00	66.00	67.50	57.75	387.10
9	Suchart Pichi (THA)	50.40	69.00	69.75	76.50	69.00	49.35	384.00
10	Niño Carog (PHI)	69.00	60.45	63.00	67.50	60.00	59.40	379.35
11	Mubarak Al-Nuaimi (QAT)	56.00	56.70	43.50	58.50	63.00	57.00	334.70
12	Sulaiman Al-Sabe (KUW)	48.00	55.50	64.50	55.35	18.60	65.10	307.05
13	Nguyễn Minh Sang (VIE)	49.00	54.60	55.35	58.80	33.00	39.60	290.35
14	Vũ Anh Duy (VIE)	45.60	33.60	44.55	54.60	52.50	49.20	280.05
15	Abdulla Safar (QAT)	54.00	50.40	37.80	36.00	42.00	40.50	260.70
16	Hussein Al-Qallaf (KUW)	0.00	28.50	46.50	63.00	66.00	51.15	255.15
17	Danil Votyakov (UZB)	36.75	43.20	51.80	29.40	33.60	35.00	229.75

=== Final ===
Rank	Athlete	Dive						Total
Rank	Athlete	1	2	3	4	5	6	Total
1st place, gold medalist(s)	He Chong (CHN)	85.25	86.70	81.00	82.25	94.50	100.70	530.40
2nd place, silver medalist(s)	Luo Yutong (CHN)	82.15	81.60	86.70	81.00	61.25	96.25	488.95
3rd place, bronze medalist(s)	Ken Terauchi (JPN)	75.00	76.50	76.50	85.00	83.70	82.25	478.95
4	Yeoh Ken Nee (MAS)	76.50	75.95	58.50	79.50	59.50	81.60	431.55
5	Suchart Pichi (THA)	60.00	72.00	77.50	70.50	70.50	78.75	429.25
6	Yu Okamoto (JPN)	67.50	75.00	80.60	72.00	78.20	47.25	420.55
7	Khairul Safwan Mansur (MAS)	70.50	71.30	71.40	64.50	72.00	61.50	411.20
8	Cho Kwan-hoon (KOR)	68.20	73.10	67.50	40.50	70.50	73.50	393.30
9	Sulaiman Al-Sabe (KUW)	70.50	61.50	66.00	56.70	65.10	68.20	388.00
10	Zardo Domenios (PHI)	66.00	57.35	64.50	66.00	67.50	61.25	382.60
11	Niño Carog (PHI)	54.00	69.75	69.00	58.50	63.00	58.05	372.30
12	Mubarak Al-Nuaimi (QAT)	63.00	62.10	49.50	52.50	61.60	40.50	329.20
