= Babikov =

Babikov (masculine, Russian: Бабиков) or Babikova (feminine, Russian: Бабиковa) is a Russian surname. Notable people with the surname include:

- Anton Babikov (born 1991), Russian biathlete
- Ivan Babikov (born 1980), Russian-born Canadian cross-country skier
- Sergey Babikov, Tajikistani sport shooter
