= Qin Kai (diver) =

Chinese diver (born 1986)

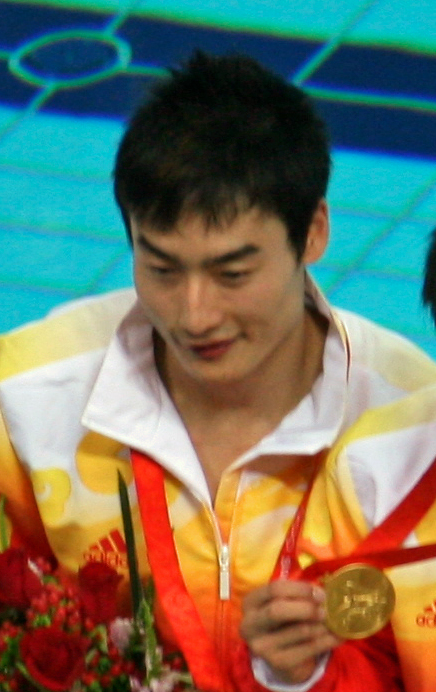
- Qin at the 2008 Summer Olympics

Personal information
- Nationality: Chinese
- Born: January 31, 1986 (age 40) Xi'an, Shaanxi
- Height: 1.70 m (5 ft 7 in)
- Weight: 64 kg (141 lb)
- Spouse: He Zi (m. 2017)

Sport
- Sport: Diving
- Event(s): 3 m, 3 m synchro
Medal record
Event	1st	2nd	3rd
Olympic Games	2	1	2
World Championships	7	–	–
Summer Universiade	2	-	-
Asian Games	1	2	–
Total	12	3	2
Men's diving
Representing China
Olympic Games
Gold medal – first place	2008 Beijing	3 m synchro
Gold medal – first place	2012 London	3 m synchro
Silver medal – second place	2012 London	3 m springboard
Bronze medal – third place	2008 Beijing	3 m springboard
Bronze medal – third place	2016 Rio de Janeiro	3 m synchro
World Championships
Gold medal – first place	2007 Melbourne	3 m springboard
Gold medal – first place	2007 Melbourne	3 m synchro
Gold medal – first place	2009 Rome	1 m springboard
Gold medal – first place	2009 Rome	3 m synchro
Gold medal – first place	2011 Shanghai	3 m synchro
Gold medal – first place	2013 Barcelona	3 m synchro
Gold medal – first place	2015 Kazan	3 m synchro
Asian Games
Gold medal – first place	2010 Guangzhou	3 m synchro
Silver medal – second place	2010 Guangzhou	1 m springboard
Silver medal – second place	2006 Doha	1 m springboard
Universiade
Gold medal – first place	2011 Shenzhen	Team
Gold medal – first place	2011 Shenzhen	3 m synchro

Qin Kai (Chinese: 秦凯; pinyin: Qín Kǎi; born January 31, 1986) is a Chinese diver. He competed for Team China at the 2008 Summer Olympics in Beijing, the 2012 Summer Olympics in London, and the 2016 Summer Olympics in Rio de Janeiro.

== Career ==
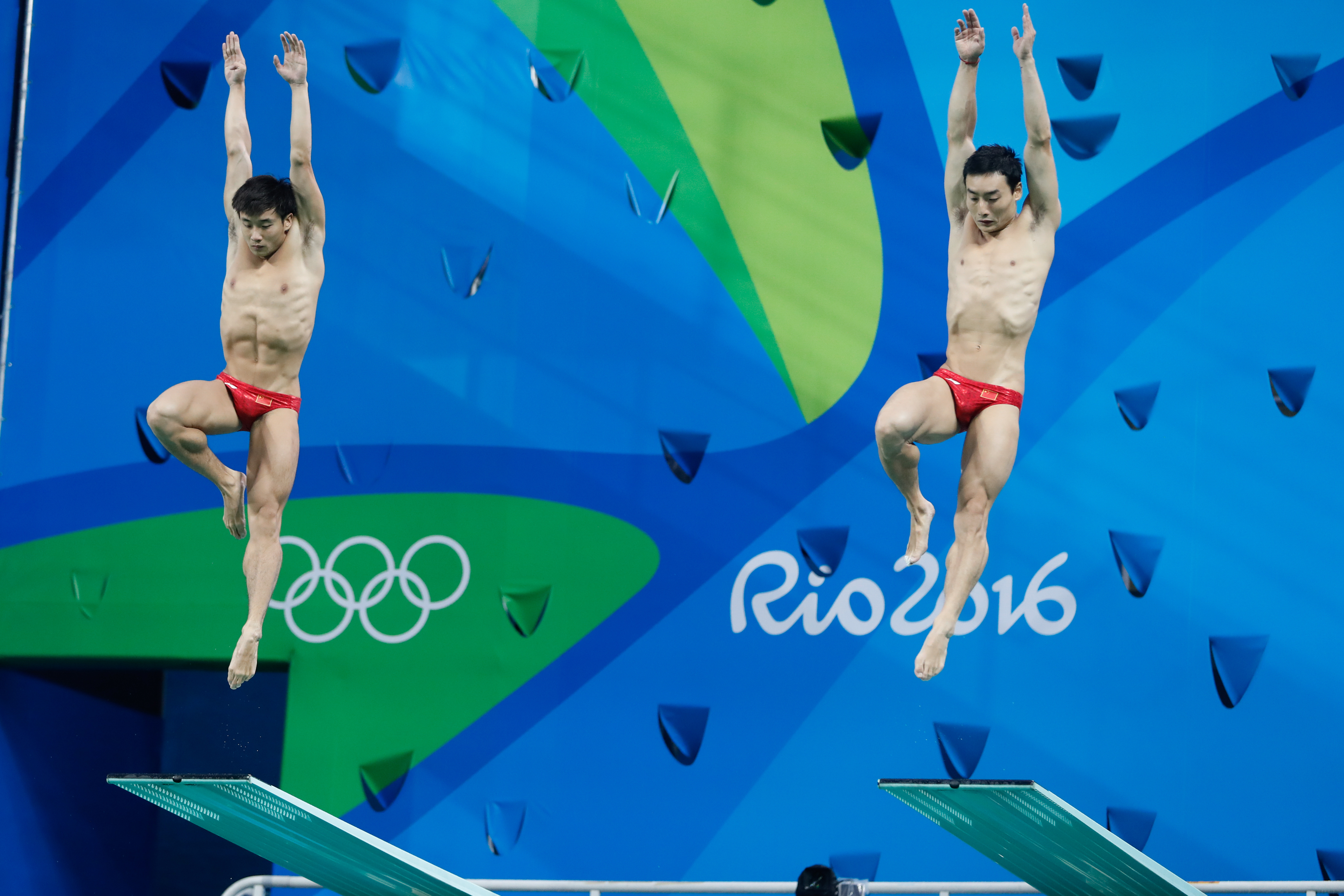
Cao Yuan and Qin at the 2016 Summer Olympics

At the 2001 World Junior Championships, he won the gold on the 3m Springboard and the silver medal on the Platform. At the 2006 National Championships, he won the silver medal on the springboard. At the 2006 World Cup, he won the gold on the 3m springboard. At the 2007 World Championships, he won the gold on the springboard and in the synchro springboard. At the 2008 World Cup, he won the gold in the 3m Synchro Springboard.

He is the 2008 Olympic Champion on the 3m Synchronized Springboard, with Wang Feng, and won bronze in the Men's 3m Springboard.

In 2009, he again won the 3m Synchronized Springboard with Wang Feng at the World Championships in Rome. He also won the individual gold at the 1m Springboard at the same championships.

At the 2012 Summer Olympics, he again competed in the men's 3 m synchronised springboard and the men's individual 3 m springboard. He retained his synchronised springboard title, this time with Luo Yutong, and won the silver medal in the individual event.

In 2013, he won gold with He Chong at the men's 3m synchro springboard World Championships in Barcelona.

In 2015, he partnered with Cao Yuan on the men's 3m synchro springboard at the World Championships in Kazan and won gold.

At the 2016 Summer Olympics, Qin won bronze in 3m synchronized dive with Cao Yuan. He retired from international competition after the Olympics.

== Personal life ==
Qin Kai proposed to fellow diver and girlfriend of 6 years, He Zi, right after she won silver in the women's 3m individual springboard at the Rio Olympics. They married in June 2017, and their daughter was born in October 2017.

== Accolades ==
In 2011, Qin was named Top Ten Athlete of Shanxi province. In 2012, he was awarded the May 1st Labour Medal in the People's Republic of China.
