= Kazuki Murakami =

Kazuki Murakami may refer to:

- Kazuki Murakami (footballer)
- Kazuki Murakami (diver)
