= Diving at the 2006 Asian Games – Men's synchronized 3 metre springboard =

Men's synchronized 3 metre springboard at the 2006 Asian Games
- Venue: Hamad Aquatic Centre
- Date: 10 December 2006
- Competitors: 16 from 8 nations

Medalists
gold medal	Wang Feng; He Chong	China
silver medal	Rossharisham Roslan; Yeoh Ken Nee	Malaysia
bronze medal	Kwon Kyung-min; Cho Kwan-hoon	South Korea

The men's synchronised 3 metre springboard diving competition at the 2006 Asian Games in Doha was held on 10 December at the Hamad Aquatic Centre.

== Schedule ==
All times are Arabia Standard Time (UTC+03:00)

Date	Time	Event
Sunday, 10 December 2006	18:00	Final

== Results ==
Rank	Team	Dive						Total
Rank	Team	1	2	3	4	5	6	Total
1st place, gold medalist(s)	China (CHN); Wang Feng; He Chong	54.00	54.00	79.98	86.70	87.72	86.10	448.50
2nd place, silver medalist(s)	Malaysia (MAS); Rossharisham Roslan; Yeoh Ken Nee	50.40	48.00	72.00	76.26	65.10	81.60	393.36
3rd place, bronze medalist(s)	South Korea (KOR); Kwon Kyung-min; Cho Kwan-hoon	46.80	49.20	76.26	72.42	69.30	77.70	391.68
4	Japan (JPN); Ken Terauchi; Yu Okamoto	49.20	49.80	65.70	60.30	76.50	74.40	375.90
5	Philippines (PHI); Zardo Domenios; Niño Carog	46.80	46.20	64.80	70.68	61.20	62.10	351.78
6	Kuwait (KUW); Sulaiman Al-Sabe; Hussein Al-Qallaf	48.60	45.60	63.00	65.70	55.08	60.45	338.43
7	Vietnam (VIE); Nguyễn Minh Sang; Vũ Anh Duy	47.40	46.20	54.00	52.92	57.51	52.92	310.95
8	Qatar (QAT); Mubarak Al-Nuaimi; Abdulla Safar	35.40	30.60	49.41	56.28	38.70	51.03	261.42
