= Diving at the 2018 Asian Games – Men's synchronized 3 metre springboard =

Men's synchronized 3 metre springboard at the 2018 Asian Games
- Venue: Gelora Bung Karno Aquatic Stadium
- Date: 28 August 2018
- Competitors: 18 from 9 nations

Medalists
gold medal	Cao Yuan; Xie Siyi	China
silver medal	Kim Yeong-nam; Woo Ha-ram	South Korea
bronze medal	Sho Sakai; Ken Terauchi	Japan

The men's synchronized 3 metre springboard competition at the 2018 Asian Games took place on 28 August 2018 at the Gelora Bung Karno Aquatic Stadium.

== Schedule ==
All times are Western Indonesia Time (UTC+07:00)

Date	Time	Event
Tuesday, 28 August 2018	20:15	Final

== Results ==
Rank	Team	Dive						Total
Rank	Team	1	2	3	4	5	6	Total
1st place, gold medalist(s)	China (CHN); Cao Yuan; Xie Siyi	54.60	54.00	88.74	86.70	92.88	102.60	479.52
2nd place, silver medalist(s)	South Korea (KOR); Kim Yeong-nam; Woo Ha-ram	49.80	49.20	74.46	81.60	75.60	82.08	412.74
3rd place, bronze medalist(s)	Japan (JPN); Sho Sakai; Ken Terauchi	51.00	50.40	74.70	74.70	80.58	77.19	408.57
4	Malaysia (MAS); Chew Yiwei; Ooi Tze Liang	50.40	50.40	73.47	79.20	61.20	81.60	396.27
5	Singapore (SGP); Mark Lee; Timothy Lee	48.60	45.00	63.00	66.60	67.89	65.28	356.37
6	India (IND); Ramananda Sharma; Siddharth Pardeshi	45.60	44.40	53.94	59.40	57.60	61.20	322.14
7	Indonesia (INA); Tri Anggoro Priambodo; Adityo Restu Putra	47.40	41.40	59.40	50.22	64.26	55.80	318.48
8	Thailand (THA); Chawanwat Juntaphadawon; Theerapat Siriboon	37.80	37.80	60.30	58.59	39.60	41.40	275.49
9	Macau (MAC); Lei Wai Shing; Tang Hio Fong	40.80	35.40	49.68	54.27	46.80	47.25	274.20
