= Diving at the 2008 Summer Olympics – Men's 10 metre platform =

Men's 10 metre platform at the Games of the XXIX Olympiad
- Date: 22–23 August

Medalists
1st place, gold medalist(s)		Matthew Mitcham	Australia
2nd place, silver medalist(s)		Zhou Lüxin	China
3rd place, bronze medalist(s)		Gleb Galperin	Russia

Men's 10 metre platform competition at the Beijing 2008 Summer Olympics was held from August 22 to August 23, at the Beijing National Aquatics Center. It was an individual diving competition, with dives performed from an inflexible platform, unlike the springboard used for three metre diving, ten metres above the surface of the water.

The individual diving competitions all consist of three rounds. In the first, the 30 divers each perform six dives. The top 18 divers advance to the semifinals. Each diver again performs six dives, and the top 12 divers from among those dives advance to the finals. Preliminary scores are ignored at this point, as only the semifinal scores are considered in advancement. In the final round, the divers perform a final set of six dives, with the scores from those dives, and only those dives, used to determine final ranking.

Seven judges evaluate each dive, giving the diver a score between 0 and 10 with increments of 0.5. The two highest and two lowest scores from the judges are dropped. The remaining three scores are summed, and then multiplied by the degree of difficulty of the dive to give the total score for the dive. Scores from each dive in the round are summed to give the round score.

== Finals ==
At the finals, held on August 23, 2008, Zhou Luxin of China was leading in the points until his last dive, where an imperfect entry gave him merely 74.80 points. Subsequently, Matthew Mitcham of Australia very strongly executed a two and a half somersault with two and a half twists in the pike position, a dive with a very high degree of difficulty of 3.8. The seven judges scored Mitcham 9.0, 9.5, 9.5, 10, 10, 10 and 10 points, giving him 112.10 points for the dive, at that time the highest single dive score in Olympic history and surpassed only in 2021 by Yang Jian. Mitcham finished on 537.95 points and was awarded the gold medal, denying China a clean sweep of all of the diving gold medals. Zhou Luxin finished on 533.15 points, securing the silver. Gleb Galperin of Russia finished on 525.80 points, securing the bronze.

== Results ==
Rank	Diver	Nation	Preliminary		Semifinal		Final
Rank	Diver	Nation	Points	Rank	Points	Rank	Points
1st place, gold medalist(s)	Matthew Mitcham	Australia	509.60	2	532.20	2	537.95
2nd place, silver medalist(s)	Zhou Lüxin	China	539.80	1	526.20	3	533.15
3rd place, bronze medalist(s)	Gleb Galperin	Russia	499.95	3	508.95	4	525.80
4	Huo Liang	China	472.95	8	549.95	1	508.40
5	José Guerra	Cuba	443.20	11	438.80	11	507.15
6	Mathew Helm	Australia	484.40	5	485.20	6	467.70
7	Tom Daley	Great Britain	440.40	12	458.60	8	463.55
8	Rommel Pacheco	Mexico	465.45	9	453.80	9	460.20
9	Patrick Hausding	Germany	423.40	17	453.30	10	448.30
10	David Boudia	United States	481.70	6	491.55	5	441.45
11	Juan Urán	Colombia	418.00	18	436.10	12	414.80
12	Thomas Finchum	United States	477.00	7	474.95	7	412.65
13	Peter Waterfield	Great Britain	497.65	4	430.95	13	Did not advance
14	Vadim Kaptur	Belarus	432.90	13	420.55	14	Did not advance
15	Jeinkler Aguirre	Cuba	423.75	16	414.20	15	Did not advance
16	Riley McCormick	Canada	425.95	14	391.35	16	Did not advance
17	Reuben Ross	Canada	425.60	15	390.75	17	Did not advance
18	Sascha Klein	Germany	453.80	10	382.85	18	Did not advance
19	Hugo Parisi	Brazil	412.95	19	did not advance		
20	Kostyantyn Milyayev	Ukraine	410.05	20	did not advance		
21	Aliaksandr Varlamau	Belarus	406.60	21	did not advance		
22	Germán Sánchez	Mexico	399.35	22	did not advance		
23	Constantin Popovici	Romania	392.30	23	did not advance		
24	Cassius Duran	Brazil	389.65	24	did not advance		
25	Francesco Dell'Uomo	Italy	388.80	25	did not advance		
26	Bryan Nickson Lomas	Malaysia	384.35	26	did not advance		
27	Oleg Vikulov	Russia	375.40	27	did not advance		
28	Rexel Ryan Fabriga	Philippines	358.85	28	did not advance		
29	Anton Zakharov	Ukraine	344.95	29	did not advance		
30	Kim Chon-man	North Korea	328.85	30	did not advance		
