= Diving at the 2010 Asian Games – Men's 1 metre springboard =

Men's 1 metre springboard at the 2010 Asian Games
- Venue: Aoti Aquatics Centre
- Date: 24 November 2010
- Competitors: 14 from 9 nations

Medalists
gold medal	He Min	China
silver medal	Qin Kai	China
bronze medal	Yeoh Ken Nee	Malaysia

The men's 1 metre springboard diving competition at the 2010 Asian Games in Guangzhou was held on 24 November at the Aoti Aquatics Centre.

== Schedule ==
All times are China Standard Time (UTC+08:00)

Date	Time	Event
Wednesday, 24 November 2010	17:00	Final

== Results ==
Rank	Athlete	Dive						Total
Rank	Athlete	1	2	3	4	5	6	Total
1st place, gold medalist(s)	He Min (CHN)	70.50	80.00	85.80	75.00	83.20	86.70	481.20
2nd place, silver medalist(s)	Qin Kai (CHN)	78.00	67.50	60.80	76.50	80.00	88.40	451.20
3rd place, bronze medalist(s)	Yeoh Ken Nee (MAS)	77.50	61.50	72.00	43.20	58.50	78.40	391.10
4	Oh Yi-taek (KOR)	59.80	64.50	54.00	68.20	58.50	57.50	362.50
5	Muhammad Fakhrul (MAS)	58.50	69.75	58.50	63.00	54.00	57.60	361.35
6	Son Seong-cheol (KOR)	65.00	61.20	55.20	62.40	74.40	30.00	348.20
7	Mojtaba Valipour (IRI)	63.70	63.00	49.50	54.00	60.45	54.60	345.25
8	Jason Poon (HKG)	63.70	57.00	36.00	39.00	59.20	69.70	324.60
9	Ghaem Mirabian (IRI)	58.50	51.75	49.50	55.50	52.50	51.15	318.90
10	Yu Okamoto (JPN)	55.90	63.00	46.50	23.25	59.80	55.50	303.95
11	Shady Salah Abdelhamid (QAT)	42.90	48.00	46.00	45.00	46.20	54.60	282.70
12	Abdulrahman Abbas (IOC)	46.80	52.00	40.25	30.00	49.50	48.10	266.65
13	Niño Carog (PHI)	57.20	47.15	55.50	66.65	37.50	0.00	264.00
14	Hamad Mohammad (IOC)	52.80	41.60	34.50	30.00	39.00	50.70	248.60
