= Diving at the 2006 Asian Games – Men's 1 metre springboard =

Men's 1 metre springboard at the 2006 Asian Games
- Venue: Hamad Aquatic Centre
- Date: 12 December 2006
- Competitors: 15 from 9 nations

Medalists
gold medal	Luo Yutong	China
silver medal	Qin Kai	China
bronze medal	Ken Terauchi	Japan

The men's 1 metre springboard diving competition at the 2006 Asian Games in Doha was held on 12 December at the Hamad Aquatic Centre.

== Schedule ==
All times are Arabia Standard Time (UTC+03:00)

Date	Time	Event
Tuesday, 12 December 2006	10:00	Preliminary
Tuesday, 12 December 2006	18:00	Final

== Results ==
=== Preliminary ===
Rank	Athlete	Dive						Total
Rank	Athlete	1	2	3	4	5	6	Total
1	Luo Yutong (CHN)	69.00	76.80	70.40	76.80	74.80	75.90	443.70
2	Qin Kai (CHN)	75.00	73.50	60.00	52.80	75.20	76.50	413.00
3	Ken Terauchi (JPN)	63.70	55.80	57.50	70.40	73.50	61.50	382.40
4	Suchart Pichi (THA)	60.90	70.50	58.50	54.40	45.00	54.40	343.70
5	Khairul Safwan Mansur (MAS)	62.40	76.50	59.40	60.00	24.00	56.00	338.30
6	Hussein Al-Qallaf (KUW)	44.95	53.30	48.30	67.50	58.50	58.50	331.05
7	Sulaiman Al-Sabe (KUW)	63.55	43.50	64.50	51.30	56.70	51.00	330.55
8	Niño Carog (PHI)	55.90	52.50	61.50	54.00	55.80	49.50	329.20
9	Yeoh Ken Nee (MAS)	62.40	72.00	52.70	0.00	66.00	67.50	320.60
10	Zardo Domenios (PHI)	59.80	51.00	55.50	51.00	52.50	43.20	313.00
11	Oh Yi-taek (KOR)	58.50	57.00	27.60	58.80	52.70	56.25	310.85
12	Yu Okamoto (JPN)	61.10	18.40	57.00	55.20	55.80	52.00	299.50
13	Mubarak Al-Nuaimi (QAT)	55.90	48.00	37.50	34.50	52.70	54.60	283.20
14	Abdulla Safar (QAT)	46.80	43.70	48.00	41.85	46.50	54.60	281.45
15	Danil Votyakov (UZB)	43.20	23.00	23.00	33.60	31.90	37.80	192.50

=== Final ===
Rank	Athlete	Dive						Total
Rank	Athlete	1	2	3	4	5	6	Total
1st place, gold medalist(s)	Luo Yutong (CHN)	81.00	67.20	70.40	80.00	85.00	82.50	466.10
2nd place, silver medalist(s)	Qin Kai (CHN)	76.50	70.50	66.00	73.60	76.80	76.50	439.90
3rd place, bronze medalist(s)	Ken Terauchi (JPN)	67.60	68.20	58.65	76.80	76.50	72.00	419.75
4	Yeoh Ken Nee (MAS)	66.30	67.50	62.90	62.70	66.00	75.00	400.40
5	Yu Okamoto (JPN)	59.80	43.70	69.00	57.60	66.65	55.90	352.65
6	Khairul Safwan Mansur (MAS)	59.80	68.00	47.85	55.50	52.50	60.80	344.45
7	Suchart Pichi (THA)	59.45	67.50	54.60	64.60	34.50	51.20	331.85
8	Sulaiman Al-Sabe (KUW)	66.65	58.50	58.50	60.75	48.60	36.00	329.00
9	Oh Yi-taek (KOR)	57.20	45.00	48.00	55.20	65.10	55.00	325.50
10	Zardo Domenios (PHI)	62.40	52.50	57.00	45.90	52.50	46.40	316.70
11	Niño Carog (PHI)	55.90	39.00	34.50	54.00	54.25	47.30	284.95
12	Hussein Al-Qallaf (KUW)	48.05	30.00	51.75	51.00	52.50	36.75	270.05
