= Diving at the 2006 Asian Games – Women's synchronized 10 metre platform =

Women's synchronized 10 metre platform at the 2006 Asian Games
- Venue: Hamad Aquatic Centre
- Date: 10 December 2006
- Competitors: 6 from 3 nations

Medalists
| gold medal | Jia Tong; Chen Ruolin | China |
| silver medal | Misako Yamashita; Mai Nakagawa | Japan |
| bronze medal | Hong In-sun; Choe Kum-hui | North Korea |

The women's synchronised 10 metre platform diving competition at the 2006 Asian Games in Doha was held on 10 December at the Hamad Aquatic Centre.

== Schedule ==
All times are Arabia Standard Time (UTC+03:00)

| Date | Time | Event |
|---|---|---|
| Sunday, 10 December 2006 | 19:10 | Final |

== Results ==
| Rank | Team | Dive | | | | | Total |
| Rank | Team | 1 | 2 | 3 | 4 | 5 | Total |
|---|---|---|---|---|---|---|---|
| 1st place, gold medalist(s) | China (CHN); Jia Tong; Chen Ruolin | 52.80 | 55.80 | 76.50 | 76.80 | 82.62 | 344.52 |
| 2nd place, silver medalist(s) | Japan (JPN); Misako Yamashita; Mai Nakagawa | 48.00 | 48.60 | 64.68 | 73.80 | 82.62 | 317.70 |
| 3rd place, bronze medalist(s) | North Korea (PRK); Hong In-sun; Choe Kum-hui | 46.80 | 49.20 | 62.10 | 68.16 | 76.50 | 302.76 |
