= Shooting at the 2006 Asian Games – Women's trap team =

Women's trap team at the 2006 Asian Games
- Venue: Lusail Shooting Range
- Dates: 2 December 2006
- Competitors: 30 from 10 nations

Medalists
| gold medal | China; Chen Li, Wang Yujin, Zhu Mei |
| silver medal | North Korea; Chae Hye-gyong, Kim Yong-bok, Pak Yong-hui |
| bronze medal | South Korea; Lee Bo-na, Lee Jung-a, Lee Myung-ae |

The women's trap team competition at the 2006 Asian Games in Doha, Qatar was held on 2 December at the Lusail Shooting Range.

== Schedule ==
All times are Arabia Standard Time (UTC+03:00)

| Date | Time | Event |
|---|---|---|
| Saturday, 2 December 2006 | 08:00 | Final |

== Records ==
Prior to this competition, the existing world, Asian and Games records were as follows.

| World Record | China | 210 | Barcelona, Spain | 23 July 1998 |
| Asian Record | China | 210 | Barcelona, Spain | 23 July 1998 |
| Games Record | North Korea | 188 | Busan, South Korea | 2 October 2002 |

== Results ==
| Rank | Team | Round | | | Total | Notes |
| Rank | Team | 1 | 2 | 3 | Total | Notes |
|---|---|---|---|---|---|---|
| 1st place, gold medalist(s) | China (CHN) | 64 | 64 | 67 | 195 | GR |
| | Chen Li | 23 | 22 | 24 | 69 | |
| | Wang Yujin | 21 | 19 | 23 | 63 | |
| | Zhu Mei | 20 | 23 | 20 | 63 | |
| 2nd place, silver medalist(s) | North Korea (PRK) | 65 | 60 | 61 | 186 | |
| | Chae Hye-gyong | 21 | 19 | 19 | 59 | |
| | Kim Yong-bok | 22 | 22 | 20 | 64 | |
| | Pak Yong-hui | 22 | 19 | 22 | 63 | |
| 3rd place, bronze medalist(s) | South Korea (KOR) | 58 | 58 | 58 | 174 | |
| | Lee Bo-na | 20 | 20 | 20 | 60 | |
| | Lee Jung-a | 20 | 18 | 13 | 51 | |
| | Lee Myung-ae | 18 | 20 | 25 | 63 | |
| 4 | Japan (JPN) | 55 | 58 | 60 | 173 | |
| | Megumi Inoue | 17 | 17 | 18 | 52 | |
| | Yukie Nakayama | 19 | 22 | 21 | 62 | |
| | Keiko Suzu | 19 | 19 | 21 | 59 | |
| 5 | Thailand (THA) | 59 | 62 | 50 | 171 | |
| | Supawan Karjaejuntasak | 19 | 19 | 17 | 55 | |
| | Chattaya Kitcharoen | 19 | 25 | 19 | 63 | |
| | Nanpapas Viravaidya | 21 | 18 | 14 | 53 | |
| 6 | Kazakhstan (KAZ) | 62 | 51 | 56 | 169 | |
| | Anastassiya Davydova | 21 | 16 | 17 | 54 | |
| | Mariya Dmitriyenko | 20 | 19 | 19 | 58 | |
| | Yelena Struchayeva | 21 | 16 | 20 | 57 | |
| 7 | Iran (IRI) | 59 | 56 | 51 | 166 | |
| | Nahla Aboumansour | 22 | 22 | 18 | 62 | |
| | Masoumeh Ameri | 19 | 14 | 15 | 48 | |
| | Sepideh Sirani | 18 | 20 | 18 | 56 | |
| 8 | Philippines (PHI) | 52 | 50 | 58 | 160 | |
| | Gay Corral | 17 | 18 | 21 | 56 | |
| | Aimee Gana | 17 | 19 | 19 | 55 | |
| | Veneranda Garcia | 18 | 13 | 18 | 49 | |
| 9 | Vietnam (VIE) | 53 | 54 | 49 | 156 | |
| | Hoàng Thị Tuất | 18 | 19 | 18 | 55 | |
| | Nguyễn Thị Tuyết Mai | 17 | 19 | 20 | 56 | |
| | Nguyễn Thùy Dương | 18 | 16 | 11 | 45 | |
| 10 | Qatar (QAT) | 40 | 38 | 55 | 133 | |
| | Noora Al-Ali | 13 | 11 | 19 | 43 | |
| | Zulaikha Al-Kubaisi | 13 | 15 | 16 | 44 | |
| | Zaineb Al-Suwaidi | 14 | 12 | 20 | 46 | |
