= Mai Nakagawa =

Japanese diver (born 1987)

Personal information
- Full name: Mai Nakagawa
- Born: 7 April 1987 (age 39) Komatsu, Ishikawa

Sport
- Country: Japan
- Sport: Diving
- Event(s): 3 m, 3 m synchro, 10 m, 10 m synchro
Medal record
Women's diving
Representing Japan
Summer Universiade
Bronze medal – third place	2007 Bangkok	10 m platform
Bronze medal – third place	2007 Bangkok	Synchronised platform
Bronze medal – third place	2015 Gwangju	10 m platform
Asian Games
Silver medal – second place	2006 Doha	10m synchro
Bronze medal – third place	2010 Guangzhou	10m synchro

Mai Nakagawa (中川 真依, Nakagawa Mai; born 7 April 1987) is a Japanese diver. She competed at the 10 metre platform event at the 2008 Summer Olympics and at the 2012 Summer Olympics.
