= Bryan Nickson Lomas =

Malaysian diver (born 1990)

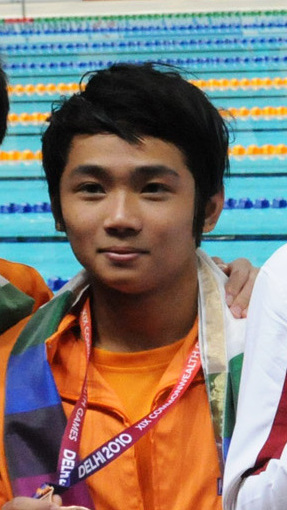
- Bryan at the 2010 Commonwealth Games.

Personal information
- Full name: Bryan Nickson Lomas
- Born: 30 June 1990 (age 36) Kuching, Sarawak
- Height: 1.64 m (5 ft 5 in)

Sport
- Country: Malaysia
- Events: 3–, 10 m springboard, platform
Medal record
Representing Malaysia
Men's Diving
Asian Games
Silver medal – second place	2010	3 m synchro platform
Silver medal – second place	2010	10 m synchro platform
Bronze medal – third place	2010	10 m platform
Commonwealth Games
Silver medal – second place	2006	10 m platform
Bronze medal – third place	2010	3 m synchro platform
Bronze medal – third place	2010	10 m platform
FINA Diving World Juniors Championships
Gold medal – first place	2004	10 m platform
Bronze medal – third place	2006	10 m platform
Southeast Asian Games
Gold medal – first place	2005	10 m platform
Gold medal – first place	2009	10 m platform
Gold medal – first place	2009	3 m synchro springboard
Gold medal – first place	2011	3 m synchro springboard
Gold medal – first place	2011	10 m platform
Silver medal – second place	2005	10 m synchro platform
FINA Diving Grand Prix
Gold medal – first place	2012	3 m synchro springboard
Gold medal – first place	2012	3 m synchro springboard
FINA Diving World Cup
Bronze medal – third place	2012	3 m synchro platform

Bryan Nickson Lomas (born 30 June 1990 in Kuching, Sarawak) is a former Malaysian diver. Lomas was the youngest Malaysian athlete to qualify for 2004 Summer Olympics when he was 14. He became the country's first world junior diving champion after winning gold at the 3 m springboard event in the World Junior Championships held at Belém, Brazil in 2004. He trained under the coaching of Yang Zhuliang. Lomas is named after the footballer Bryan Robson by his father.

In September 2023, he was appointed as Malaysia Swimming Federation (MAS) technical director.

== Career ==
At the age of 14, Lomas was the second youngest athlete to compete in the 2004 Summer Olympics in Athens, Greece and was the flag-bearer of Malaysia in the opening ceremony. He competed in the 10 meter platform event in which with 407.13 points he finished at 19th spot. In the 2005 SEA Games held in the Philippines, Lomas won the gold medal for the 10 m platform event and silver for 10 m synchronised platform event alongside James Sandayud.

Lomas represented Malaysia in diving in the 2007 World Aquatics Championships held in Melbourne, Australia. He entered in the 10 m platform event and ranked seventh in the final standings with 469.25 points. This seventh-place finish ensured him a berth for 2008 Beijing Olympics. In 2006, Lomas along with teammate James Sandayud entered the Synchronised 10m Platform Competition and won Silver in the 2006 Commonwealth Games in Melbourne, Australia. He earned 9th in the 10 m platform diving event finals at the 2006 Asian Games held in Doha, Qatar.

Lomas competed in the 2008 Summer Olympics in Beijing, China, qualifying for the 10 metre platform after finishing seventh in the 2007 World Aquatics Championships. In the event, Lomas earned only 384.35 points, and eliminated in the preliminary round. He finished at the 26th spot. In December 2009, Lomas won gold medals for both 10 m platform event and the 3 m synchronised springboard event with teammate Yeoh Ken Nee.

Competing in the 2010 Commonwealth Games held in Delhi, India, he won bronze in the 10m Individual Platform competition and finished 7th in both the 3m Individual Platform and 1m Individual Platform competition. For Synchronised Diving, he, together with teammate Yeoh Ken Nee, won bronze in the Synchronised 3m Platform Competition.

Lomas competed in the 2010 Asian Games held in the Guangzhou, China. Lomas entered in three events: 10 m platform, synchronised 3 m springboard (with Yeoh Ken Nee), synchronised 10 m springboard (with Ooi Tze Liang). He succeeded in winning two silvers in both the synchronisation events and a bronze medal in another. In the 2011 World Aquatics Championships, Lomas competes in diving's 3 m springboard and 10 m platform. He finished 11th in the former, but only ranked 24th in the latter.

The 2012 FINA Diving World Cup held in London, United Kingdom saw Lomas and Huang Qiang earning Bronze in the Synchronized 3 metre springboard event and qualifying for the 2012 Summer Olympics. In the 2012 Summer Olympics held in London, United Kingdom, Lomas competed in two diving events. He was ranked 8th in the synchronised 3 m springboard event alongside Huang Qiang. In the 10 metre platform event, Lomas earned 434.95 points, and was eliminated in the preliminary round, finishing at the 19th spot.

== Awards and recognition ==
Lomas was named Sarawak Sportsman of the Year for three times; 2005/2006, 2007/2008 and 2011/2012. He was also named as one of fifteen awardees for the Sarawak Youth and Sports Icon Award in 2011. At the 2015 UM Sports Awards, he was honored with the Lifetime Achievement Award.

== Personal life ==
He retired from diving in May 2013. He had in 2015 graduated with distinction honours from Universiti Malaya, with a Bachelor in Sports Science (Sports Management) Degree. In 2017, he secured a master's degree in sports administration from the Russian International Olympic University. He is coaching part-time with the Selangor team and aspire to open a diving academy; either in Sarawak or Kuala Lumpur.

Olympic Games
Preceded by Mirnawan Nawawi	Flagbearer for Malaysia; Athens 2004	Succeeded by Azizulhasni Awang
