= William Demarest (sport shooter) =

American sport shooter

Personal information
- Nationality: American
- Born: December 20, 1964 (age 61) Worcester, Massachusetts

Sport
- Sport: Shooting

William Demarest (born December 20, 1964) is an American sport shooter. He was born in Worcester, Massachusetts. He competed at the 2000 Summer Olympics in Sydney, competing in two events, the Men's 10m Air Pistol and the Men's 50m Free Pistol, finishing 23rd in both disciplines.

== Early life ==
Demarest began his shooting career as a teenager in Massachusetts. Beyond his shooting career, Demarest also pursued higher education, earning a Bachelor of Business Administration (BBA) in 1989 and a master's degree in 1997, both from National University in San Diego.

== Later career ==
He worked at Boeing, contributing to the certification of airplanes for the Federal Aviation Administration (FAA) as part of their Southern California flight test team
