= Son Seong-cheol =

South Korean diver

Personal information
- Nationality: South Korea
- Born: 14 February 1987 (age 39)
- Height: 1.70 m (5 ft 7 in)
- Weight: 63 kg (139 lb)

Sport
- Sport: Diving
- Event(s): 3 m, 3 m synchro
- Partner: Park Ji-Ho
Medal record
Men's diving
Representing South Korea
Asian Games
| Bronze medal – third place | 2010 Guangzhou | 3 m synchro |

Son Seong-cheol (Korean: 손성철; born February 14, 1987) is a South Korean springboard diver. He won a bronze medal, along with his partner Park Ji-Ho, for the men's synchronized springboard at the 2010 Asian Games in Guangzhou, China, accumulating a score of 388.26 points.

Son represented South Korea at the 2008 Summer Olympics in Beijing, where he competed as the nation's lone diver for the men's springboard event. He placed last out of twenty-nine divers in the preliminary round by seven points behind Italy's Tommaso Marconi, with a total score of 353.35 after six successive attempts.
