= He Chong =

Chinese diver (born 1987)

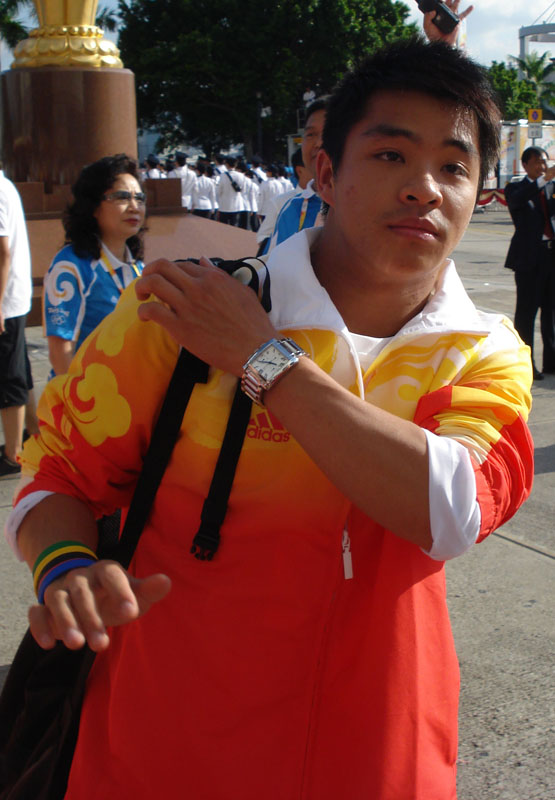

Personal information
- Nationality: CHN
- Born: June 10, 1987 (age 39) Zhanjiang, Guangdong

Sport
- Sport: Diving
- Events: 3 m, 3 m synchro
Medal record
Event	1st	2nd	3rd
Olympic Games	1	–	1
World Championships	5	1	1
Summer Universiade	2	-	-
FINA Diving World Cup	5	–	–
Asian Games	3	–	–
Olympic Games
Gold medal – first place	2008 Beijing	3 m springboard
Bronze medal – third place	2012 London	3 m springboard
World Championships
Gold medal – first place	2005 Montreal	3 m synchro
Gold medal – first place	2009 Rome	3 m springboard
Gold medal – first place	2011 Shanghai	3 m springboard
Gold medal – first place	2013 Barcelona	3 m springboard
Gold medal – first place	2013 Barcelona	3 m synchro
Silver medal – second place	2007 Melbourne	1 m springboard
Bronze medal – third place	2005 Montreal	3 m springboard
Summer Universiade
Gold medal – first place	2011 Shenzhen	Team
Gold medal – first place	2011 Shenzhen	3 m springboard
FINA Diving World Cup
Gold medal – first place	2006 Changshu	1 m springboard
Gold medal – first place	2006 Changshu	3 m synchro
Gold medal – first place	2008 Beijing	3 m springboard
Gold medal – first place	2010 Changshu	3 m springboard
Gold medal – first place	2012 London	3 m springboard
Gold medal – first place	2014 Shanghai	3 m springboard
Asian Games
Gold medal – first place	2006 Doha	3 m springboard
Gold medal – first place	2006 Doha	3 m synchro
Gold medal – first place	2010 Guangzhou	3 m springboard

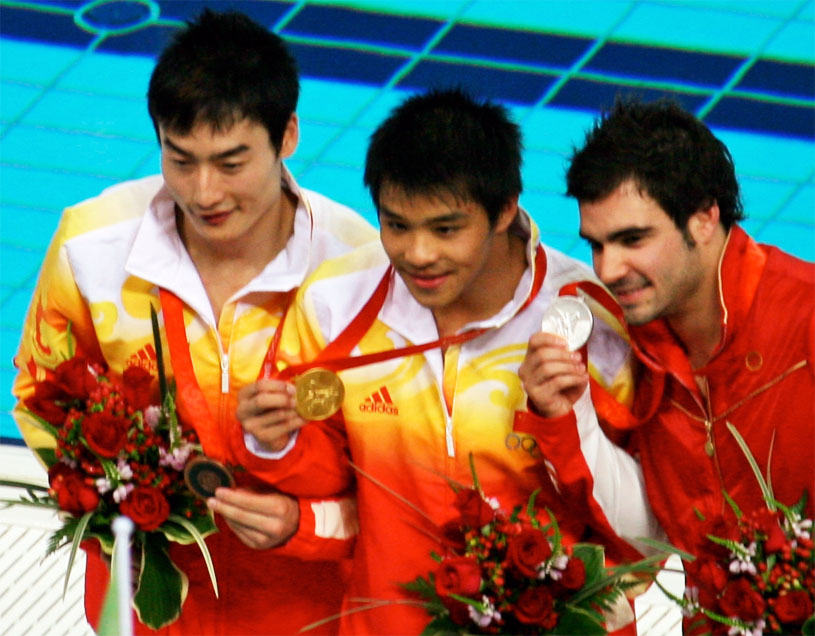
He at the 2008 Olympics with Qin Kai and Alexandre Despatie

He Chong (simplified Chinese: 何冲; traditional Chinese: 何衝; pinyin: Hé Chōng; Cantonese Yale: Ho4 Chung1; born June 10, 1987, in Zhanjiang, Guangdong) is a Chinese diver. He is the 2008 Olympic Champion in the 3m springboard.

He split with partner Wang Feng after they won a gold medal in the 3m synchronised springboard event at the 2005 World Championships. The two staged a reunion and won gold at the same event in the 2006 Diving World Cup in Changshu, China.

At the 2008 Olympics He Chong defeated an elite field of divers including, the two time world champion Alexandre Despatie, the 2006 world cup champion Qin Kai, and eight time Olympic medalist Dmitri Sautin.

He lit the flame at the 2010 Asian Games opening ceremony.

He is often referred to as the greatest springboard diver in history due to having gone almost unbeaten from 2008 to 2016. He is hoping to be the first diver to regain an individual diving Olympic title at the 2016 Rio Games, after a rare off day led to a loss of his title in 2012 where he won only bronze, his only loss in a Fina World Cup final, World Championships, or Olympics he competed in from 2008 to 2014. He was left off the Chinese team for the 2016 Rio Games in favor of his own brother He Chao, the 2015 World 3 metre Champion.

== Major performances ==
- 2005 World Championships – 1st 3m springboard synchro;
- 2005 National Games – 1st 1m springboard;
- 2006/2008 World Cup – 1st 1m/3m springboard
- 2008 Beijing Olympics 3m springboard Gold Medalist
- 2009 FINA World Championships 3m springboard Gold medallist
- 2012 London Olympics 3m springboard bronze

=== Olympic Games ===
- 3m Springboard 2008 Beijing, CHN 572.90

=== World Championships ===
- 3m Springboard 2013 Barcelona, SPA 544.95
- 3m Springboard 2011 Shanghai, CHN 554.30
- 3m Springboard 2009 Rome, ITA 505.20
- Synchronised 3m Springboard 2005 Montreal, QC, CAN 384.42
- 1m Springboard 2007 Melbourne, VIC, AUS 469.85
- 3m Springboard 2005 Montreal, QC, CAN 730.77

=== Asian Games ===
- 3m Springboard 2010 Guangzhou, CHN 525.85

=== World Series ===
- 3m Springboard 2012 Moscow, RUS 497.65
- 3m Springboard 2012 Beijing, CHN 548.70
- 3m Springboard 2012 Dubai, UAE 522.25
- 3m Springboard 2011 Guanajuato, MEX 519.20
- 3m Springboard 2011 Sheffield, GBR 531.15
- 3m Springboard 2011 Beijing, CHN 536.25
- 3m Springboard 2011 Moscow, RUS 486.00

=== World Cup ===
- 3m Springboard 2012 London, GBR 535.35
- 3m Springboard 2010 Changzhou, CHN 546.55

=== Grand Prix ===
- 3m Springboard 2011 Fort Lauderdale, FL, US 487.05

Awards
Preceded by (Russia) Ilya Zakharov	FINA Male Diver of the Year; 2013	Succeeded by (China) Cao Yuan
