= Park Ji-ho (diver) =

South Korean diver (born 1991)

Personal information
- Born: September 11, 1991 (age 34) Busan, South Korea

Sport
- Sport: Diving
Medal record
Representing South Korea
Asian Games
Bronze medal – third place	2010 Guangzhou	3m springboard synchro

Park Ji-ho (born 11 September 1991) is a South Korean diver. He competed in the 10 metre platform event at the 2012 Summer Olympics. In 2010, Park won bronze in the synchronized 3 metre springboard event at the Asian Games with Son Seong-cheol.
