= Kim Myong-hwa =

North Korean sports shooter (born 1967)

- Hangul: 김명화
- RR: Gim Myeonghwa
- MR: Kim Myŏnghwa

Kim Myong-hwa (Korean: 김명화; born April 25, 1967) is a North Korean sport shooter. She competed at the 2000 Summer Olympics in the women's skeet event, in which she tied for 9th place.
