= Pak Jong-ran =

North Korean sport shooter

Personal information
- Nationality: North Korea
- Born: 24 March 1966 (age 60)
- Height: 1.62 m (5 ft 4 in)
- Weight: 60 kg (132 lb)

Sport
- Sport: Shooting
- Event: Skeet
- Club: D.P.R.K. Shootong Sport; Association
- Coached by: Sim Jae-gun
Medal record
Women's shooting
Representing North Korea
Asian Games
Gold medal – first place	1990 Beijing	Skeet
World Championships
Gold medal – first place	1991 Perth	Skeet
Asian Championships
Gold medal – first place	2007 Kuwait City	Skeet
Gold medal – first place	2007 Kuwait City	Skeet team

- Pak Jong-ran
- Hangul: 박정란
- RR: Bak Jeongran
- MR: Pak Chŏngnan

Pak Jong-ran (Korean: 박정란; born March 24, 1966) is a North Korean sport shooter. She won two gold medals in the women's skeet at the 1990 Asian Games in Beijing, China, and at the 1991 ISSF World Shooting Championships in Perth, Western Australia, with scores of 197 and 191 targets, respectively.

Pak made her official debut for the 1992 Summer Olympics in Barcelona, where she placed thirty-third in mixed skeet shooting, with a score of 144 hits, tying her position with eight other shooters including Egypt's Mohamed Khorshed and Norway's Harald Jensen.

Sixteen years after competing in her last Olympics, Pak qualified for her second North Korean team, as a 42-year-old, at the 2008 Summer Olympics in Beijing, by winning the gold medal in the women's skeet from the 2007 Asian Shooting Championships in Kuwait City, Kuwait. She placed ninth in the qualifying rounds of the women's skeet shooting, by three points ahead of Romania's Lucia Mihalache from the second attempt, with a total score of 66 targets.
