= Choe Kum-hui =

North Korean diver (born 1987)

Personal information
- Nationality: North Korea
- Born: 1 July 1987 (age 39)
- Height: 1.57 m (5 ft 2 in)
- Weight: 46 kg (101 lb)

Sport
- Sport: Diving
- Event(s): 10 m, 10 m synchro
- Partner: Kim Un-hyang

Korean name
- Hangul: 최금희
- RR: Choe Geumhui
- MR: Ch'oe Kŭmhŭi
Medal record
Women's diving
Representing North Korea
Universiade
Silver medal – second place	2005 İzmir	10 m synchro
Silver medal – second place	2007 Bangkok	10 m synchro
Bronze medal – third place	2009 Belgrade	10 m synchro
Asian Games
Bronze medal – third place	2006 Doha	10 m synchro
Bronze medal – third place	2010 Guangzhou	10 m synchro

Choe Kum-hui (Korean: 최금희; born July 1, 1987) is a North Korean platform diver. She won two bronze medals for the women's synchronized platform at the 2006 Asian Games in Doha, Qatar, and at the 2010 Asian Games in Guangzhou, China. Choe also captured three silver medals in the same event at the Summer Universiade (2005 in İzmir, Turkey, 2007 in Bangkok, Thailand, and 2005 in Belgrade, Serbia).

Choe represented North Korea at the 2008 Summer Olympics in Beijing, where she competed for the women's 10 m synchronized platform event. She and her partner Kim Un-hyang finished sixth in the final round by one point behind the U.S. team (Mary Beth Dunnichay and Haley Ishimatsu), with a total score of 308.10 after five successive attempts.
