= Khalid Ahmed Mohamed =

Bahraini sport shooter

Personal information
- Full name: Khalid Mohamed
- Nationality: Bahrain
- Born: 12 August 1976 (age 49) Manama, Bahrain
- Height: 1.78 m (5 ft 10 in)
- Weight: 68 kg (150 lb)

Sport
- Sport: Shooting
- Event(s): 10 m air pistol (AP60); 50 m pistol (FP)

Khalid Ahmed Mohamed (Arabic: خالد احمد محمد; born August 12, 1976, in Manama) is a Bahraini sport shooter. He was selected to compete for Bahrain in pistol shooting at the 2004 Summer Olympics, and in three of the Asian Games (2002 to 2010).

Mohamed qualified as a lone shooter for the Hungarian squad in men's 10 m air pistol at the 2004 Summer Olympics in Athens. Although he failed to make the cut to the Games, Mohamed had accepted a late wildcard entry invitation by ISSF for another Olympic chance with a minimum qualifying score of 565, his personal best set at the ISSF World Cup meet in Zagreb, Croatia a year earlier. Mohamed launched a substantial 553 out of a possible 600 to pick up a forty-fifth position from an experienced field of forty-seven shooters, failing to advance to the final.
