= Ken Terauchi =

Japanese diver

Personal information
- Nationality: Japan
- Born: 7 August 1980 (age 45) Takarazuka, Hyōgo
- Height: 1.70 m (5 ft 7 in)
- Weight: 68 kg (150 lb)

Sport
- Sport: Diving
- Event(s): 1 m springboard 3 m springboard 10 m platform
- Club: JSS Takarazuka (JPN)
- Coached by: Suei Mabuchi
Medal record
Men's diving
Representing Japan
World Championships
Bronze medal – third place	2001 Fukuoka	3 m springboard
Universiade
Silver medal – second place	1999 Palma de Mallorca	3 m springboard
Bronze medal – third place	2003 Daegu	3 m springboard
Bronze medal – third place	2001 Beijing	3 m springboard
Asian Games
Bronze medal – third place	2018 Jakarta-Palembang	Synchronized 3 m springboard
Bronze medal – third place	2006 Doha	1 m springboard
Bronze medal – third place	2006 Doha	3 m springboard

Ken Terauchi (寺内 健, Terauchi Ken; born 7 August 1980 in Takarazuka, Hyōgo) is a Japanese diver, who specialized in springboard and platform events. He had won two bronze medals for the springboard diving at the 2006 Asian Games in Doha, Qatar, in addition to his first at the 2001 FINA World Championships in Fukuoka.

Terauchi has represented Japan in Six Olympic Games (1996 in Atlanta, 2000 in Sydney, 2004 in Athens, 2008 in Beijing, 2016 in Rio de Janeiro and 2021 in Tokyo). He reached into the finals for all of his respective events but the 2016 Olympics one, although he never captured a single Olympic medal. His best result was further achieved at the 2000 Summer Olympics in Sydney, when he placed fifth in the men's 10 m platform, with a cumulative score of 636.90 points.

Terauchi retired temporarily in 2009, and worked as an employee for sports manufacturing company Mizuno. A year later, he resumed training to set sights for his fifth Olympics, and made his comeback by placing second at a domestic meet. In 2012, Terauchi had received a qualifying berth at the FINA Diving World Cup, but Japan Swimming Federation decided not to send him to London for the Summer Olympics, despite that he was not able to perform well against the world's top divers.

Terauchi is a graduate of clinical psychology at Koshien University in Takarazuka, Hyōgo.

Terauchi is currently the oldest diver in Olympic history, and the first diver to have appeared in six different Olympic Games.
