= Tan Zongliang =

Chinese sports shooter (born 1971)

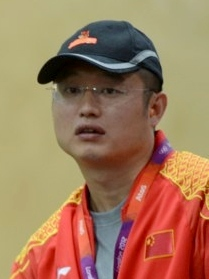
- Tan Zongliang at the 2012 Olympics

Personal information
- Born: November 29, 1971 (age 54) Weifang, Shandong, China
- Height: 1.79 m (5 ft 10 in)
- Weight: 86 kg (190 lb)

Sport
- Sport: Shooting
- Club: Shandong Provincial Sports School
Medal record
Men's shooting
Representing China
Olympic Games
Silver medal – second place	2008 Beijing	50 m pistol
Asian Championships
Gold medal – first place	2007 Kuwait City	10 m air pistol
Gold medal – first place	2007 Kuwait City	10 m air pistol team
Gold medal – first place	2007 Kuwait City	50 m pistol team

Tan Zongliang (Chinese: 谭宗亮; pinyin: Tán Zōngliàng; born November 29, 1971) is a male Chinese sports shooter who competed at five consecutive Olympics from 1996 to 2012. He has won two consecutive ISSF World Shooting Championships in 50 metre pistol: in 2002 in Lahti and in 2006 in Zagreb. At the 2008 Summer Olympics, he won the bronze medal in the same event, a medal that was upgraded to silver after Kim Jong-su's disqualification for use of the banned drug, propranolol.

Olympic results
Events	1996	2000	2004	2008	2012
50 metre pistol	—	—	10th 558	(silver) Silver; 565+94.5	—
10 metre air pistol	6th 581+101.0	11th 578	9th 582	10th 580	12th 581
