= Huo Liang =

Chinese diver (born 1989)

Personal information
- Nationality: China
- Born: September 29, 1989 (age 36) Shanghai
- Height: 1.55 m (5 ft 1 in)

Sport
- Sport: Diving
- Event(s): 10 m, 10 m synchro
Medal record
Event	1st	2nd	3rd
Olympic Games	1	-	-
World Championships	3	-	-
FINA Diving World Cup	2	1	-
Summer Universiade	5	-	-
Asian Games	1	-	-
Olympic Games
Gold medal – first place	2008 Beijing	10m synchro
World Championships
Gold medal – first place	2007 Melbourne	10m synchro
Gold medal – first place	2009 Rome	10m synchro
Gold medal – first place	2011 Shanghai	10m synchro
Summer Universiade
Gold medal – first place	2011 Shenzhen	Team
Gold medal – first place	2011 Shenzhen	10 m synchro
Gold medal – first place	2013 Kazan	Team
Gold medal – first place	2013 Kazan	10 m synchro
Gold medal – first place	2013 Kazan	10 m platform
FINA Diving World Cup
Gold medal – first place	2006 Changshu	10m synchro
Gold medal – first place	2008 Beijing	10m synchro
Silver medal – second place	2010 Changhzou	10m platform
Asian Games
Gold medal – first place	2006 Doha	10m synchro
Silver medal – second place	2010 Guangzhou	10m platform

Huo Liang (Chinese: 火亮; pinyin: Huǒ Liàng; born September 29, 1989, in Shanghai) is a Chinese athlete who competes in diving. In addition to his gold medal in the 10m Platform Sync. event at the 2008 Summer Olympics, he competed in the 10m Platform event, placing 4th in the final round.

Huo is the only male diver who has won World Championships in Men's synchronized 10-meter platform three consecutive times. Huo's coach is Yan Hu.

== Major achievements ==
He claimed the gold medal at the 2008 World Cup – 10m platform synchro Event.
