= Zhou Lüxin =

Chinese diver

Personal information
- Born: July 31, 1988 (age 37) Wuhu, Anhui

Sport
- Country: China
- Event: 10 m
Medal record
Olympic Games
Silver medal – second place	2008	10 m
World Championships
Silver medal – second place	2007	10 m
Bronze medal – third place	2009	10 m
FINA Diving World Cup
Gold medal – first place	2006	10 m
Silver medal – second place	2008	10 m
Asian Games
Gold medal – first place	2010	10 m synchro
Silver medal – second place	2006	10 m

Zhou Lüxin (simplified Chinese: 周吕鑫; traditional Chinese: 周呂鑫; pinyin: Zhōu Lǚxīn; born July 31, 1988, in Wuhu, Anhui) is a Chinese diver. He competed for Team China at the 2008 Summer Olympics in Beijing.

== Major achievements ==
He claimed the gold medal at the 2006 World Cup - 10m platform event. He also won the silver medal at the 2008 Summer Olympics - 10m platform event. Zhou was greatly favored to win the 10m event; however, on his 6th and final dive, a reverse 3 1/2 somersaults, he kicked early and arched in on his entry. He received poor scores while Matthew Mitcham hit his final dive for a record breaking score, overtaking Zhou for the gold medal, while Zhou received the silver medal.
