= Kazuki Murakami (diver) =

Japanese diver

Personal information
- Nationality: Japan
- Born: 19 May 1989 (age 37) Tomioka, Japan

Sport
- Sport: Diving

Kazuki Murakami (村上和基, Murakami Kazuki; born 19 May 1989) is a Japanese diver. He competed in the 2020 Summer Olympics.

== Results ==
Event	Team	Result	Sport	Event
Tokyo 2020	Japan	#8	Diving	Men's Synchronized 10m Platform
