= Kim Chon-man =

North Korean diver (born 1987)

Personal information
- Born: 1987 (age 38–39)

Sport
- Sport: Diving
Medal record
Representing North Korea
Asian Games
Silver medal – second place	2006 Doha	10m platform synchro
Bronze medal – third place	2006 Doha	10m platform
Bronze medal – third place	2010 Guangzhou	10m platform synchro

- Kim Chon-man
- Hangul: 김천만
- RR: Gim Cheonman
- MR: Kim Ch'ŏnman

Kim Chon-man (Korean: 김천만; born 1987) is a North Korean diver who competed at the 2008 Summer Olympics.
