= Kim Jong-su =

North Korean sport shooter (born 1977)

- Hangul: 김정수
- Hanja: 金正秀
- RR: Gim Jeongsu
- MR: Kim Chŏngsu

Kim Jong-su
Medal record

Men's shooting

Representing North Korea

Olympic Games
Bronze medal – third place	2004 Athens	50 m pistol
Disqualified	2008 Beijing	10 m air pistol
Disqualified	2008 Beijing	50 m pistol

Asian Games
Gold medal – first place	1998 Bangkok	50 m pistol team
Silver medal – second place	2006 Doha	10 m air pistol
Silver medal – second place	2006 Doha	50 m pistol team
Silver medal – second place	2010 Guangzhou	25 m standard pistol
Bronze medal – third place	1998 Bangkok	50 m pistol
Bronze medal – third place	2002 Busan	50 m pistol team
Bronze medal – third place	2002 Busan	50 m pistol
Bronze medal – third place	2006 Doha	50 m pistol
Bronze medal – third place	2010 Guangzhou	25 m standard pistol team
Bronze medal – third place	2010 Guangzhou	25 m center fire pistol team

Asian Championships
Gold medal – first place	2007 Kuwait City	25 m center fire pistol team
Gold medal – first place	2007 Kuwait City	25 m standard pistol team
Silver medal – second place	2007 Kuwait City	25 m standard pistol
Bronze medal – third place	2007 Kuwait City	10 m air pistol
Bronze medal – third place	2007 Kuwait City	25 m center fire pistol

Kim Jong-su (Korean pronunciation: [kim.dzʌŋ.su] or [kim] [tsʌŋ.su]; born January 1, 1977) is a North Korean sport shooter.

He won the bronze medal in the 50 metre pistol competition at the 2004 Summer Olympics held in Athens.

== Doping disqualification at the 2008 Olympics ==
Kim competed in the 10 metre air pistol event during the 2008 Olympics on August 9, where he came third in the qualification round, with 584 points, and again third in the final round, with 683.0 points, initially earning a bronze medal. Three days later, he then competed in the 50 metre pistol event, where he scored 563 and 660.2 points for qualification and final rounds respectively, thus earning a silver medal.

=== Propranolol doping ===
On August 15, 2008, three days after Kim won his third Olympic medal, the International Olympic Committee announced that he had tested positive for the banned substance propranolol during a doping test. Propranolol is a beta blocker that is mainly used to treat hypertension, but also prevents trembling. Kim was stripped of his two medals from the 2008 Summer Olympics, making Kim the second athlete, and first medal winning athlete, to test positive for a banned substance at the 2008 Olympic Games. In the 10 metre air pistol, the bronze medal went to Jason Turner of the United States. In the 50 metre pistol, the silver medal went to Tan Zongliang of China, and the bronze medal went to Vladimir Isakov of Russia.

=== Media response within North Korea ===
While media outside North Korea reported on Kim's disqualification, the Korean Central News Agency did not report on the incident. On August 15, the day when Kim Jong-su officially had his medals revoked, the KCNA reported:

Kim Jong Su placed second in the men's 50 metre free pistol and third in the men's 10 meter air pistol.

No news reports since August 15 have mention of Kim's disqualification.

== Performance timelines ==
=== 50 metre pistol ===
	2004	2005	2006	2007	2008
Olympic Games	(bronze) Bronze; 564+93.7	Not held			DQ
World Championships	Not held		5th 565+95.2	Not held	
Asian Games/Championships		Not held		14th 547	Not held
World Cup 1		—	6th 565+91.1	—	—
World Cup 2		—	—	—	5th 564+98.1
World Cup 3		26th 556	—	19th 556	—
World Cup 4		—	—	—	—
World Cup Final		NQ	NQ	NQ	NQ

=== 25 metre center-fire pistol ===
	2004	2005	2006	2007	2008
World Championships	Not held		32nd 575	Not held	
Asian Games/Championships		Not held		Bronze; 582	Not held

=== 25 metre standard pistol ===
	2004	2005	2006	2007	2008
World Championships	Not held		(silver) Silver; 575	Not held	
Asian Games/Championships		Not held		Silver; 570	Not held

=== 10 metre air pistol ===
	2004	2005	2006	2007	2008
Olympic Games	8th 582+99.2	Not held			DQ
World Championships	Not held		14th 580	Not held	
Asian Games/Championships		—		Bronze; 580+100.2	—
World Cup 1		—	(silver) Silver; 585+99.5	—	
World Cup 2		—	—	—	(bronze) Bronze; 583+99.0
World Cup 3		10th 584	—	13th 582	—
World Cup 4		—	—	—	—
World Cup Final		NQ	NQ	NQ	NQ

Kim has not appeared in the Olympics since 2008 and last appeared in competition in 2010 during the Asian Games.
