= Yeoh Ken Nee =

Malaysian diver

Personal information
- Born: 30 April 1983 (age 43) Kuala Lumpur, Malaysia
- Height: 1.70 m (5 ft 7 in)

Sport
- Country: Malaysia
Medal record
Representing Malaysia
Men's diving
Asian Games
Silver medal – second place	2006 Doha	Synch 3 m springboard
Silver medal – second place	2010 Guangzhou	Synch 3 m springboard
Bronze medal – third place	2002 Busan	3 m springboard
Bronze medal – third place	2002 Busan	Synch 3 m springboard
Bronze medal – third place	2010 Guangzhou	1 m springboard
Bronze medal – third place	2010 Guangzhou	3 m springboard
Southeast Asian Games
Gold medal – first place	2001 Kuala Lumpur	3 m springboard
Gold medal – first place	2001 Kuala Lumpur	synchro 3 m
Gold medal – first place	2001 Kuala Lumpur	synchro 10 m

Yeoh Ken Nee

Chinese name
- Traditional Chinese: 楊健立
- Simplified Chinese: 杨健立
- Hanyu Pinyin: Yáng Jiànlì
- Jyutping: Joeng4 Gin6 Laap6
- Hokkien POJ: Iôⁿ Kiān-li̍p
- Tâi-lô: Iônn Kiān-li̍p

Yeoh Ken Nee (simplified Chinese: 杨健立; traditional Chinese: 楊健立; pinyin: Yáng Jiànlì; Jyutping: Joeng4 Gin6 Laap6; Pe̍h-ōe-jī: Iôⁿ Kiān-li̍p; born 30 April 1983) is a Malaysian diver.

As a 15-year-old he competed in Diving at the 1998 Commonwealth Games. He competed at the 2000 Summer Olympics in Sydney. In 2009, he competed in the 2009 World Aquatics Championships in the Men's 3 m synchro springboard and Men's 3 m springboard, finishing in 11th and 29th position respectively.

In June 2010, he competed in the 2010 FINA Diving World Cup in Changzhou, Jiangsu, People's Republic of China. His diving team even won a silver medal in the 2010 Asian Games at Guangzhou, China. In 2012 he competed in the 2012 Summer Olympics in London. He has become the first Malaysian to qualify for a final of an individual event in the diving competition at the Olympics. He was ranked 10th in Men's 3m Springboard diving event.

== Swimwear ==
=== Arena ===
- ARN-8044 BLU
- ARN-9034 BPNK
- ARN-9058 BLK

== Honour ==
=== Honour of Malaysia ===
- Malaysia
  - Medallist of the Order of the Defender of the Realm (P.P.N.; 2003)
