= Diving platform =

Type of structure used for competitive acrobatic diving

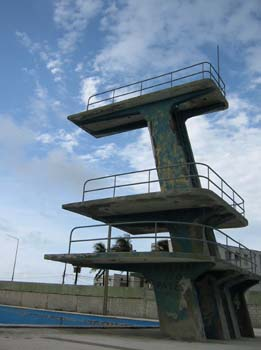
A competitive diving platform at an outdoor swimming pool.

A diving platform or diving tower is a type of structure used for competitive diving. It consists of a vertical rigid "tower" with one or more horizontal platforms extending out over a deep pool of water. In platform diving, the diver jumps from a high stationary surface. The height of the platforms – 10 metres (33 ft), 7.5 metres (25 ft) and 5 metres (16 ft) – gives the diver enough time to perform the acrobatic movements of a particular dive. There are additional platforms set at 3 metres (9.8 ft) and 1 metre (3.3 ft). Diving platforms for FINA sanctioned meets must be at least 6 metres (20 ft) long and 2 metres (6.6 ft) wide. Most platforms are covered by some sort of matting or non-slip surface to prevent athletes from slipping.

All three levels of the platform are used in the NCAA competition. Each level offers a distinct degree of difficulty (DD) and therefore can yield different scores for divers.

== Ten-meter diving ==
Diving began in the Olympics in 1904 for men, in what was called "fancy diving", which has been believed variously to have been off a platform or off a springboard. The 10-meter dive began in the 1908 Olympics. Diving for women started in the 1912 Olympics, with the 10-meter dive.

In 2016, dives performed by competitors in 10-meter world competition included a 3-½ somersault tuck, a 3-½ somersault pike, a 2-½ somersault with 2½ twist, a forward 4-½ somersault, and a forward reverse 3½ somersault.

== See also ==
- Springboard
- List of 10-meter diving platforms
