= Sergey Babikov =

Tajikistani sport shooter

Sergey Babikov is a Tajikistani sport shooter, born in Dushanbe, who competes in the men's 10 metre air pistol. At the 2012 Summer Olympics, he finished 44th (last) in the qualifying round, failing to advance to the final round.
