= Chronological summary of the 2012 Summer Olympics =

This article contains a chronological summary of major events from the 2012 Summer Olympics in London.

All times are in British Summer Time (UTC+1).

== Calendar ==
All times and dates use British Summer Time (UTC+1)

OC	Opening ceremony	●	Event competitions	1	Gold medal events	CC	Closing ceremony

July/August 2012		July							August												Events
July/August 2012		25th Wed	26th Thu	27th Fri	28th Sat	29th Sun	30th Mon	31st Tue	1st Wed	2nd Thu	3rd Fri	4th Sat	5th Sun	6th Mon	7th Tue	8th Wed	9th Thu	10th Fri	11th Sat	12th Sun	Events
Ceremonies				OC																CC	—N/a
Aquatics	Diving					1	1	1	1		●	●	1	●	1	●	1	●	1		46
Aquatics	Marathon swimming																1	1			46
Aquatics	Swimming				4	4	4	4	4	4	4	4									46
Aquatics	Synchronized swimming												●	●	1		●	1			46
Aquatics	Water polo					●	●	●	●	●	●	●	●	●	●	●	1	●		1	46
Archery				●	1	1	●	●	●	1	1										4
Athletics											2	6	6	5	4	4	5	6	8	1	47
Badminton					●	●	●	●	●	●	1	2	2								5
Basketball					●	●	●	●	●	●	●	●	●	●	●	●	●	●	1	1	2
Boxing					●	●	●	●	●	●	●	●	●	●	●	●	3	●	5	5	13
Canoeing	Slalom					●	●	1	1	2											16
Canoeing	Sprint													●	●	4	4	●	4		16
Cycling	Road cycling				1	1			2												18
Cycling	Track cycling									2	2	1	1	1	3						18
Cycling	BMX															●	●	2			18
Cycling	Mountain biking																		1	1	18
Equestrian					●	●	●	2		●	●	●	●	1	1	1	1				6
Fencing					1	1	1	1	2	1	1	1	1								10
Field hockey						●	●	●	●	●	●	●	●	●	●	●	●	1	1		2
Football		●	●		●	●		●	●		●	●		●	●		1	●	1		2
Gymnastics	Artistic				●	●	1	1	1	1			3	3	4						18
Gymnastics	Rhythmic																●	●	1	1	18
Gymnastics	Trampolining										1	1									18
Handball					●	●	●	●	●	●	●	●	●	●	●	●	●	●	1	1	2
Judo					2	2	2	2	2	2	2										14
Modern pentathlon																			1	1	2
Rowing					●	●	●	●	3	3	4	4									14
Sailing						●	●	●	●	●	●	●	2	2	2	1		2	1		10
Shooting					2	2	1	1	1	1	2	2	1	2							15
Table tennis					●	●	●	●	1	1	●	●	●	●	1	1					4
Taekwondo																2	2	2	2		8
Tennis					●	●	●	●	●	●	●	2	3								5
Triathlon												1			1						2
Volleyball	Beach volleyball				●	●	●	●	●	●	●	●	●	●	●	1	1				4
Volleyball	Indoor volleyball				●	●	●	●	●	●	●	●	●	●	●	●	●	●	1	1	4
Weightlifting					1	2	2	2	2		2	1	1	1	1						15
Wrestling													2	3	2	2	2	2	3	2	18
Daily medal events					12	14	12	15	20	18	22	25	23	18	21	16	22	17	32	15	302
Cumulative total					12	26	38	53	73	91	113	138	161	179	200	216	238	255	287	302	302
July/August 2012		25th Wed	26th Thu	27th Fri	28th Sat	29th Sun	30th Mon	31st Tue	1st Wed	2nd Thu	3rd Fri	4th Sat	5th Sun	6th Mon	7th Tue	8th Wed	9th Thu	10th Fri	11th Sat	12th Sun	Total events
July/August 2012		July							August												Total events

== Day-by-day summaries ==
=== 25 July ===
Football

- The first competitions of the Games started at 16:00. The first events were women's football matches, with six preliminary round matches held.
- Cristiane of Brazil scored her 11th Olympic goal, setting the women's record for most goals in the Olympics.
- A mistake occurred at the North Korea v. Colombia women's football match, as organisers mistakenly displayed the South Korean flag for the North Korean players. The North Korean team refused to take the field for nearly an hour. The organisers corrected the error and apologised.

=== 26 July ===
Football

- The competitions started at 12:00. The events at the men's football matches included eight preliminary round matches held.

=== 27 July ===
Archery

- The ranking round for men began at 9:00; for women at 13:00.
- In the men's competition, Im Dong-Hyun of South Korea set an individual world record of 699 points for 72 arrows. The South Korean team also set a new world record for a 216 arrow total, with 2,087 points.

Opening ceremony

- The Games officially began with the opening ceremony and Parade of Nations in the evening.
- The Olympic Cauldron was lit by seven young sportspeople, each of whom had been nominated by a past British Olympian. The seven were; Cameron MacRitchie, rower, nominated by Steve Redgrave; Adelle Tracey, athlete, nominated by Kelly Holmes; Katie Kirk, athlete, nominated by Mary Peters; Desirèe Henry, athlete, nominated by Daley Thompson; Jordan Duckitt, nominated by Duncan Goodhew; Aidan Reynolds, javelin thrower, nominated by Lynn Davies; Callum Airlie, sailor, nominated by Shirley Robertson.

=== Day 1: 28 July ===
Archery

- Italy won the men's team final, defeating the United States, 219–218.

Cycling

- Alexander Vinokourov of Kazakhstan won the men's road race, with a time of 5:45:57.

Fencing

- In the women's foil, Italy took all three medals, with Elisa Di Francisca, Arianna Errigo and Valentina Vezzali winning gold, silver and bronze, respectively.

Judo

- Brazil's Sarah Menezes defeated Romania's Alina Dumitru in the women's extra-lightweight final.
- Arsen Galstyan of Russia defeated Hiroaki Hiraoka of Japan in the men's extra-lightweight final.

Rowing

- New Zealand's men's coxless pair of Eric Murray and Hamish Bond set a new world record of 6:08.50.
- New Zealand's men's double sculls of Nathan Cohen and Joseph Sullivan set a new Olympic record in the heats with a time of 6:11.30.
- Great Britain's Helen Glover and Heather Stanning set a new Olympic record of 6:57.29 in the heats of the women's coxless pair.
- Tim Maeyens of Belgium set an Olympic record in the heats of the men's single sculls.

Shooting

- Yi Siling of China won the first gold medal of the Games in the women's 10 metre air rifle.
- South Korea's Jin Jong-oh won the gold medal of the men's 10 metre air pistol final.

Swimming

- Ryan Lochte of the United States won his first gold medal, completing the men's 400-metre individual medley final in 4:05.18. Michael Phelps finished 4th and out of the medals at an Olympic event for the first time since the 2000 Olympics in Sydney.
- Sun Yang of China set a new Olympic record, completing the men's 400 metre freestyle final in 3:40.14. Sun also became the first Chinese male swimmer to win an Olympic gold medal. Meanwhile, silver medallist Park Tae-Hwan (South Korea) had been disqualified after the heats for a false start, but was reinstated after an appeal.
- Ye Shiwen of China established a new world record of 4:28.43 in winning the women's 400 metre individual medley.
- Australia won the women's 4 × 100 metre freestyle relay in a new Olympic record time of 3:33.15.
- In the women's 100-metre butterfly heats, American Dana Vollmer set a new Olympic record, 56.25.

Weightlifting

- Wang Mingjuan of China won the gold medal in the women's 48 kg final.
- Albanian weightlifter Hysen Pulaku, an entrant in the men's 77 kg division, was disqualified after testing positive for the banned steroid stanozolol.

Gold medalists
Sport	Event	Competitor(s)	NOC	Rec	Ref
Archery	Men's team	Michele Frangilli, Marco Galiazzo, Mauro Nespoli	Italy		
Cycling	Men's road race	Alexander Vinokourov	Kazakhstan		
Fencing	Women's foil	Elisa Di Francisca	Italy		
Judo	Women's 48 kg	Sarah Menezes	Brazil		
Judo	Men's 60 kg	Arsen Galstyan	Russia		
Shooting	Women's 10 metre air rifle	Yi Siling	China		
Shooting	Men's 10 metre air pistol	Jin Jong-oh	South Korea		
Swimming	Men's 400 metre individual medley	Ryan Lochte	United States		
Swimming	Men's 400 metre freestyle	Sun Yang	China	OR	
Swimming	Women's 400 metre individual medley	Ye Shiwen	China	WR	
Swimming	Women's 4 × 100 metre freestyle relay	Alicia Coutts, Cate Campbell, Brittany Elmslie, Melanie Schlanger; Heats: Emily Seebohm, Yolane Kukla, Libby Trickett	Australia	OR	
Weightlifting	Women's 48 kg	Wang Mingjuan	China		

=== Day 2: 29 July ===
Archery

- South Korea defeated China, 210–209, in the women's team final, while Japan defeated Russia for bronze, 209–207.

Cycling

- Marianne Vos of the Netherlands won the women's road race gold, while Great Britain won silver and Russia won bronze.

Diving

- Teaming with her partner He Zi, China's Wu Minxia won her third consecutive gold medal in the women's synchronised 3 metre springboard.

Fencing

- Áron Szilágyi won Hungary's first gold medal, defeating Italy's Diego Occhiuzzi, 15–8, in the men's sabre final.

Gymnastics

- Luiza Galiulina of Uzbekistan was suspended after traces of banned diuretic furosemide were found in a urine sample.

Judo

- North Korea's An Kum-Ae defeated Cuba's Yanet Bermoy in the women's half-lightweight final.
- Lasha Shavdatuashvili of Georgia won the men's half-lightweight final against Miklós Ungvári of Hungary.

Shooting

- China's Guo Wenjun won the gold medal in the women's 10 metre air pistol final, while France's Céline Goberville defeated Ukraine's Olena Kostevych in a tie-breaking shoot-out to claim the silver.
- American Kim Rhode compiled an Olympic record of 99 points to win the gold medal in the women's skeet, becoming the first US athlete to medal in individual events at five Olympics.

Swimming

- American Dana Vollmer won the gold medal in the women's 100 metre butterfly, setting a world record of 55.98.
- Cameron van der Burgh of South Africa set a world record of 58.46 to win the gold medal in the men's 100 metre breaststroke.
- France's Camille Muffat won the gold medal in the women's 400 metre freestyle in an Olympic record time of 4:01.54.
- Yannick Agnel look the lead in the final lap of the men's 4 × 100 metre freestyle relay final to give France victory.

Weightlifting

- Kazakhstan's Zulfiya Chinshanlo set a world record in the clean and jerk, lifting 131 kg, en route to winning the gold medal in the women's 53 kg.
- Om Yun-Chol of North Korea won the gold medal in the men's 56 kg, setting an Olympic record of lifting 168 kg in the clean and jerk.

Gold medalists
Sport	Event	Competitor(s)	NOC	Rec	Ref
Archery	Women's team	Lee Sung-Jin, Ki Bo-bae, Choi Hyeonju	South Korea		
Cycling	Women's road race	Marianne Vos	Netherlands		
Diving	Women's synchronized 3 metre springboard	He Zi, Wu Minxia	China		
Fencing	Men's sabre	Áron Szilágyi	Hungary		
Judo	Women's 52 kg	An Kum-Ae	North Korea		
Judo	Men's 66 kg	Lasha Shavdatuashvili	Georgia		
Shooting	Women's 10 metre air pistol	Guo Wenjun	China		
Shooting	Women's skeet	Kim Rhode	United States	OR	
Swimming	Women's 100 metre butterfly	Dana Vollmer	United States	WR	
Swimming	Men's 100 metre breaststroke	Cameron van der Burgh	South Africa	WR	
Swimming	Women's 400 metre freestyle	Camille Muffat	France	OR	
Swimming	Men's 4 × 100 metre freestyle relay	Amaury Leveaux, Fabien Gilot; Clément Lefert, Yannick Agnel; Heats: Alain Bernard, Jérémy Stravius	France		
Weightlifting	Women's 53 kg	Zulfiya Chinshanlo	Kazakhstan	WR	
Weightlifting	Men's 56 kg	Om Yun-Chol	North Korea	OR	

=== Day 3: 30 July ===
Diving

- Cao Yuan and Zhang Yanquan of China won the gold medal in the men's synchronized 10 metre platform diving.

Fencing

- Controversy surrounded the semi-finals of the women's épée, as judges awarded Germany's Britta Heidemann a 6–5 victory over South Korea's Shin A-Lam after complaints over the time keeping during the last seconds of the match.
- Ukraine's Yana Shemyakina defeated Heidemann in the gold medal match of the women's épée, 9–8, while China's Sun Yujie defeated Shin in the bronze medal match, 15–11.

Gymnastics

- China won gold in the men's artistic team all-around; with Japan earning the silver medal; and Great Britain taking the bronze, the host nation's first Olympic team gymnastics medal in a century. An appeal and a video review overturned an initial ruling on Kōhei Uchimura's dismount off the pommel horse, raising Japan's score from fourth to the silver medal position, and dropping Ukraine out of the medals.

Judo

- Kaori Matsumoto won Japan's first gold medal of the 2012 games in the women's lightweight, defeating Romania's Corina Căprioriu in the final.
- Russia's Mansur Isaev won gold in the men's lightweight final against Riki Nakaya of Japan.

Shooting

- Alin Moldoveanu of Romania won the men's 10 metre air rifle final, while Italy's Niccolò Campriani took home silver, and India's Gagan Narang won bronze. Both Moldoveanu and Campriani tied the Olympic qualification round record of 599.

Swimming

- Yannick Agnel won his second gold medal, and France's third swimming gold medal in two days, in the men's 200 metre freestyle. There was a dead heat for second place, with both Sun Yang and Park Tae-Hwan receiving silver medals.
- American Missy Franklin won gold in the women's 100 metre backstroke.
- Matt Grevers of the United States set a new Olympic record of 52.16 to win gold in the men's 100 metre backstroke.
- Fifteen-year-old Rūta Meilutytė of Lithuania won gold at the women's 100 metre breaststroke, the country's first ever swimming medal at the Olympics. She defeated the defending Olympic champion United States' Rebecca Soni by 0.08 seconds.

Weightlifting

- China's Li Xueying set new Olympic records in the snatch with 108 kg and in total weight lift with 246 kg en route to claiming the gold medal in the women's 58 kg final.
- Kim Un-Guk of North Korea lifted an Olympic record 153 kg in the snatch, as well as a new world record of 327 kg total, to win gold in the men's 62 kg final. Colombian silver medalist Óscar Figueroa also broke a clean and jerk Olympic record when he lifted 177 kg.

Gold medalists
Sport	Event	Competitor(s)	NOC	Rec	Ref
Diving	Men's synchronized 10 metre platform	Cao Yuan, Zhang Yanquan	China		
Fencing	Women's épée	Yana Shemyakina	Ukraine		
Gymnastics	Men's artistic team all-around	Chen Yibing, Feng Zhe; Guo Weiyang, Zhang Chenglong; Zou Kai	China		
Judo	Women's 57 kg	Kaori Matsumoto	Japan		
Judo	Men's 73 kg	Mansur Isaev	Russia		
Shooting	Men's 10 metre air rifle	Alin Moldoveanu	Romania		
Swimming	Men's 200 metre freestyle	Yannick Agnel	France		
Swimming	Women's 100 metre backstroke	Missy Franklin	United States		
Swimming	Men's 100 metre backstroke	Matt Grevers	United States	OR	
Swimming	Women's 100 metre breaststroke	Rūta Meilutytė	Lithuania		
Weightlifting	Men's 62 kg	Kim Un-Guk	North Korea	WR	
Weightlifting	Women's 58 kg	Li Xueying	China	OR	

=== Day 4: 31 July ===
Badminton

- Officials of the Badminton World Federation charged eight players of trying to deliberately lose their last group stage matches in order to draw favourable matchups in the knockout stage of the women's doubles.

Canoeing

- France's Tony Estanguet won gold in the men's slalom C-1 final, while Sideris Tasiadis of Germany won silver, and Michal Martikán of Slovakia won bronze.

Diving

- Chen Ruolin and Wang Hao of China won gold in the women's synchronised 10 metre platform final, while Paola Espinosa and Alejandra Orozco of Mexico won silver, and Meaghan Benfeito and Roseline Filion of Canada won bronze.

Equestrian

- Germany claimed the first Equestrian gold of the 2012 Olympic Games in the team eventing final, with Great Britain taking the silver and New Zealand winning the bronze.
- Michael Jung of Germany won gold in the Individual eventing, while Sara Algotsson Ostholt of Sweden won silver, and Sandra Auffarth of Germany won bronze.

Fencing

- Lei Sheng of China defeated Alaaeldin Abouelkassem of Egypt in the gold medal match of the men's foil, 15–13, while Choi Byung-Chul of South Korea defeated Andrea Baldini, 15–14, to win the bronze.

Gymnastics

- The United States won gold in the women's artistic team all-around final with Russia claiming silver and Romania finishing third for bronze.

Judo

- Urška Žolnir of Slovenia won gold in the women's 63 kg final, beating China's Xu Lili.
- Kim Jae-Bum of South Korea won gold in the men's 81 kg final, beating Germany's Ole Bischof by yuko. This was the reverse of the 2008 Olympics when Bischof defeated Kim by yuko for the gold.

Shooting

- Vincent Hancock of the United States won his second successive gold medal in the men's skeet final, setting a new Olympic record of 123. Anders Golding of Denmark won silver, and Nasser Al-Attiyah of Qatar won bronze.

Swimming

- Allison Schmitt of the United States won gold in the women's 200 metre freestyle in a new Olympic record time of 1:53.61.
- South Africa's Chad le Clos claimed gold in the men's 200 metre butterfly with the United States' Michael Phelps claiming the silver and Takeshi Matsuda of Japan winning the bronze. Le Clos finished 0.05 seconds ahead of Phelps.
- Ye Shiwen of China claimed gold in the women's 200 metre individual medley with an Olympic record of 2:07.57, while Alicia Coutts of Australia won silver.
- The United States won gold in the men's 4 × 200 metre freestyle relay. Michael Phelps, swimming the final leg, won a record 19th Olympic medal.

Weightlifting

- Maiya Maneza of Kazakhstan won gold in the women's 63 kg final, setting an Olympic record of 245 kg, with Svetlana Tsarukayeva of Russia winning silver, and Christine Girard of Canada winning bronze.
- China's Lin Qingfeng claimed gold in the Men's 69 kg, while Indonesia's Triyatno won silver, and Romania's Răzvan Martin won bronze.

Gold medalists
Sport	Event	Competitor(s)	NOC	Rec	Ref
Canoeing	Men's slalom C-1	Tony Estanguet	France		
Diving	Women's synchronised 10 metre platform	Chen Ruolin; Wang Hao	China		
Equestrian	Individual eventing	Michael Jung	Germany		
Equestrian	Team eventing	Peter Thomsen, Dirk Schrade; Ingrid Klimke, Sandra Auffarth; Michael Jung	Germany		
Fencing	Men's foil	Lei Sheng	China		
Gymnastics	Women's artistic team all-around	Gabby Douglas, McKayla Maroney, Aly Raisman, Kyla Ross, Jordyn Wieber	United States		
Judo	Men's 81 kg	Kim Jae-Bum	South Korea		
Judo	Women's 63 kg	Urška Žolnir	Slovenia		
Shooting	Men's skeet	Vincent Hancock	United States	OR	
Swimming	Women's 200 metre freestyle	Allison Schmitt	United States	OR	
Swimming	Men's 200 metre butterfly	Chad le Clos	South Africa		
Swimming	Women's 200 metre individual medley	Ye Shiwen	China	OR	
Swimming	Men's 4 × 200 metre freestyle relay	Ryan Lochte, Conor Dwyer, Ricky Berens, Michael Phelps; Heats: Charlie Houchin, Matt McLean, Davis Tarwater	United States		
Weightlifting	Men's 69 kg	Lin Qingfeng	China		
Weightlifting	Women's 63 kg	Maiya Maneza	Kazakhstan	OR	

=== Day 5: 1 August ===
Badminton

- All four women doubles team accused of throwing badminton matches the prior day were disqualified. They were the Indonesian team, both teams from South Korea, and the world champion team from China.

Boxing

- In the men's bantamweight round of 16, Azerbaijan's Magomed Abdulhamidov was given the win over Japan's Satoshi Shimizu despite having been knocked down five times in the last round. Japan filed an appeal which overturned the win. The referee from Turkmenistan was subsequently expelled from the games.
- In the men's heavyweight round of 16, Iran's Ali Mazaheri was disqualified because he received three penalties for holding giving Cuba's José Larduet the win. The referee from Germany subsequently received a five-day suspension for questionable judgement.

Canoeing

- Daniele Molmenti of Italy took gold in the men's slalom K-1 final, while Vavřinec Hradilek gave the Czech Republic its first medal with his silver, and Hannes Aigner took bronze.

Cycling

- The United States' Kristin Armstrong successfully defended her title in the women's road time trial, with Germany's Judith Arndt second, and Russia's Olga Zabelinskaya third.
- Bradley Wiggins of Great Britain won the men's road time trial, while Tony Martin of Germany took silver, and Chris Froome of Great Britain won bronze. Wiggins' gold was his seventh Olympic medal, a new record for a British Olympian.

Diving

- China's Luo Yutong and Qin Kai took gold in the men's synchronised 3 metre springboard final, ahead of Russia's Evgeny Kuznetsov and Ilya Zakharov who took silver, and Troy Dumais and Kristian Ipsen, of the United States, who were third.

Fencing

- Rubén Limardo won Venezuela's first Olympic gold medal since 1968, defeating Norway's Bartosz Piasecki in the men's épée final, 15–10.
- Kim Ji-yeon of South Korea defeated Sofiya Velikaya of Russia, 15–9, in the women's sabre final.

Gymnastics

- Kōhei Uchimura of Japan took gold in the men's artistic individual all-around final, while Marcel Nguyen of Germany took silver, and Danell Leyva of the United States took bronze.

Judo

- France's Lucie Décosse defeated Germany's Kerstin Thiele to win gold in the women's 70 kg.
- Song Dae-Nam of South Korea defeated Cuba's Asley González in the men's 90 kg final.

Rowing

- Germany won gold in the men's eight, with Canada taking silver and Great Britain in third.
- Helen Glover and Heather Stanning of Great Britain earned the host nation's first gold in the women's coxless pair final, while Australia took silver and New Zealand took bronze.
- Kateryna Tarasenko, Nataliya Dovgodko, Anastasiya Kozhenkova, and Yana Dementyeva of Ukraine took gold in the women's quadruple sculls final, ahead of Germany and the United States.

Shooting

- South Korea's Kim Jang-Mi won gold in the women's 25 metre pistol, narrowly beating the defending 2008 Olympic gold medalist, Chen Ying of China.

Swimming

- Hungary's Dániel Gyurta set a new world record of 2:07.28 to win gold in the Men's 200 metre breaststroke. Michael Jamieson of Great Britain claimed the silver and Japan's Ryo Tateishi earned the bronze.
- Jiao Liuyang won gold in the Women's 200 metre butterfly in a new Olympic record time of 2:04.06. Mireia Belmonte of Spain won the silver medal and Natsumi Hoshi of Japan won the bronze medal.
- Nathan Adrian of the United States won gold by 0.01 seconds in the men's 100 metre freestyle, and became the first American to claim the title in this sporting event since Matt Biondi in 1988. James Magnussen of Australia claimed the silver and Canada's Brent Hayden earned the bronze.
- The United States set a new Olympic record of 7:42.92 to win the gold medal in the Women's 4 × 200 metre freestyle relay. Australia won the silver and France took the bronze.

Table tennis

- China's Li Xiaoxia beat her compatriot Ding Ning in the gold medal match of the women's singles. Feng Tianwei of Singapore defeated Kasumi Ishikawa of Japan in the bronze medal match.

Weightlifting

- North Korea's Rim Jong-Sim claimed gold in the women's 69 kg, while Romania's Roxana Cocoș won the silver and Belarus' Maryna Shkermankova earned bronze.
- China's Lü Xiaojun won gold in the men's 77 kg, setting two new world records with a lift of 175 kg in the snatch and a total weightage of 379 kg. Lu Haojie of China won silver despite picking up an injury during the snatch, while Cuba's Iván Cambar won the bronze.

Gold medalists
Sport	Event	Competitor(s)	NOC	Rec	Ref
Canoeing	Men's slalom K-1	Daniele Molmenti	Italy		
Cycling	Men's road time trial	Bradley Wiggins	Great Britain		
Cycling	Women's road time trial	Kristin Armstrong	United States		
Diving	Men's synchronized 3 metre springboard	Luo Yutong, Qin Kai	China		
Fencing	Men's épée	Rubén Limardo	Venezuela		
Fencing	Women's sabre	Kim Ji-yeon	South Korea		
Gymnastics	Men's artistic individual all-around	Kōhei Uchimura	Japan		
Judo	Men's 90 kg	Song Dae-Nam	South Korea		
Judo	Women's 70 kg	Lucie Décosse	France		
Rowing	Men's eight	Filip Adamski, Andreas Kuffner, Eric Johannesen, Maximilian Reinelt, Richard Schmidt, Lukas Müller, Florian Mennigen, Kristof Wilke, Martin Sauer	Germany		
Rowing	Women's coxless pair	Helen Glover, Heather Stanning	Great Britain		
Rowing	Women's quadruple sculls	Kateryna Tarasenko, Nataliya Dovgodko, Anastasiya Kozhenkova, Yana Dementyeva	Ukraine		
Shooting	Women's 25 metre pistol	Kim Jang-Mi	South Korea		
Swimming	Men's 200 metre breaststroke	Dániel Gyurta	Hungary	WR	
Swimming	Women's 200 metre butterfly	Jiao Liuyang	China	OR	
Swimming	Men's 100 metre freestyle	Nathan Adrian	United States		
Swimming	Women's 4 × 200 metre freestyle relay	Missy Franklin, Dana Vollmer, Shannon Vreeland, Allison Schmitt; Heats: Lauren Perdue, Alyssa Anderson	United States	OR	
Table tennis	Women's singles	Li Xiaoxia	China		
Weightlifting	Men's 77 kg	Lü Xiaojun	China	WR	
Weightlifting	Women's 69 kg	Rim Jong-Sim	North Korea		

=== Day 6: 2 August ===
Archery

- The final of the women's individual was tied after five rounds, before Ki Bo-bae of South Korea beat Mexico's Aída Román in a single arrow shoot-off. Mariana Avitia, also of Mexico, won the bronze.

Canoeing

- Great Britain took both gold and silver medals in the men's slalom C-2 final, with Tim Baillie and Etienne Stott beating David Florence and Richard Hounslow, while Slovak twins Pavol and Peter Hochschorner took bronze.
- Émilie Fer of France won the women's slalom K-1, with Australia's Jessica Fox second and Maialen Chourraut (Spain) third.

Cycling

- In the women's team sprint, the world record was beaten by Great Britain, and subsequently by China, in the qualification, before China improved the record further in the first round. Germany won the gold medal after Britain were relegated in the first round, and China in the final, both for exchange of riders outside the designated area. China took the silver medals, and Australia the bronze.
- Great Britain won the men's team sprint, having set world records in both the first round and the final, allowing Chris Hoy to equal Steve Redgrave's British record of five Olympic gold medals. France finished second, with Germany third. A minor controversy erupted when German-born Philip Hindes of the gold medal British team told the BBC that the team had pre-planned a crash in case they did not start fast enough. British Cycling suggested Hindes' comments were "lost in translation".
- In the men's team pursuit, Great Britain set a world record of 3:52.499 in the qualification round.

Fencing

- Italy won the women's team foil final, defeating Russia 45–31. South Korea was victorious against France, 45–32, in the bronze medal match.

Gymnastics

- American Gabby Douglas finished ahead of Russian Viktoria Komova in the women's artistic individual all-around final to win the gold. Russian Aliya Mustafina was awarded the bronze ahead of American Aly Raisman based on the "sum of the three highest apparatus scores" tiebreaker.

Judo

- In the women's 78 kg final, Kayla Harrison became the first Olympic judo gold medalist ever for the United States with her win over Gemma Gibbons of Great Britain by yuko.
- Russian Tagir Khaybulaev won the men's 100 kg final, beating Naidangiin Tüvshinbayar who became the first Olympic multi-medalist from Mongolia.

Rowing

- New Zealand world champions Nathan Cohen and Joseph Sullivan won the men's double sculls final, with Italy and Slovenia finishing second and third respectively.
- South Africa won the country's first ever gold medal in rowing in the men's lightweight coxless four, with Great Britain coming second and Denmark third.
- The women's eight final was won by defending champions the United States, ahead of Canada and the Netherlands.

Shooting

- Peter Wilson of Great Britain won the men's double trap by two shots from Sweden's Håkan Dahlby, with Vasily Mosin of Russia winning a shoot-off for bronze.

Swimming

- American Rebecca Soni set a world record of 2:19.59 to win the women's 200 metre breaststroke final.
- Tyler Clary of the United States won gold at the Men's 200 metre backstroke final with an Olympic record of 1:53.41. Japan's Ryosuke Irie won silver and American Ryan Lochte, the defending champion won bronze.
- Michael Phelps extended his Olympic medal records and became the first male swimmer to win gold in the same event at three consecutive Olympics, by winning the men's 200 metre individual medley final.
- Another Olympic record fell during the women's 100 metre freestyle final when Ranomi Kromowidjojo of the Netherlands won gold with a time of 53.00.

Table tennis

- China's Zhang Jike defeated his compatriot Wang Hao in the men's singles final in five sets.

Gold medalists
Sport	Event	Competitor(s)	NOC	Rec	Ref
Archery	Women's individual	Ki Bo-bae	South Korea		
Canoeing	Men's slalom C-2	Tim Baillie, Etienne Stott	Great Britain		
Canoeing	Women's slalom K-1	Émilie Fer	France		
Cycling	Women's team sprint	Kristina Vogel, Miriam Welte	Germany		
Cycling	Men's team sprint	Philip Hindes, Chris Hoy, Jason Kenny	Great Britain	WR	
Fencing	Women's team foil	Elisa Di Francisca, Arianna Errigo, Ilaria Salvatori, Valentina Vezzali	Italy		
Gymnastics	Women's artistic individual all-around	Gabby Douglas	United States		
Judo	Women's 78 kg	Kayla Harrison	United States		
Judo	Men's 100 kg	Tagir Khaybulaev	Russia		
Rowing	Men's double sculls	Nathan Cohen, Joseph Sullivan	New Zealand		
Rowing	Men's lightweight coxless four	James Thompson, Matthew Brittain, John Smith, Sizwe Ndlovu	South Africa		
Rowing	Women's eight	Erin Cafaro, Susan Francia, Esther Lofgren, Taylor Ritzel, Meghan Musnicki, Elle Logan, Caroline Lind, Caryn Davies, Mary Whipple	United States		
Shooting	Men's double trap	Peter Wilson	Great Britain		
Swimming	Women's 200 metre breaststroke	Rebecca Soni	United States	WR	
Swimming	Men's 200 metre backstroke	Tyler Clary	United States	OR	
Swimming	Men's 200 metre individual medley	Michael Phelps	United States		
Swimming	Women's 100 metre freestyle	Ranomi Kromowidjojo	Netherlands	OR	
Table tennis	Men's singles	Zhang Jike	China		

=== Day 7: 3 August ===
Archery

- South Korea's Oh Jin-Hyek added gold in the men's individual event to the bronze he won in the team event. Takaharu Furukawa of Japan took the silver with bronze going to China's Dai Xiaoxiang.

Athletics

- Poland's Tomasz Majewski successfully defended the men's shot put title he won in Beijing in 2008. David Storl of Germany claimed the silver medal and Reese Hoffa of the United States took bronze.
- Ethiopia's Tirunesh Dibaba retained her women's 10,000 metres title with Sally Kipyego and Vivian Cheruiyot taking silver and bronze for Kenya.

Badminton

- Zhang Nan and Zhao Yunlei of China won gold in the mixed doubles beating compatriots Xu Chen and Ma Jin in the final, while Denmark's Joachim Fischer Nielsen and Christinna Pedersen won the bronze.

Boxing

- The AIBA Olympic Compliance Committee expelled international technical official Aghajan Abiyev of Azerbaijan "for breaching the governing body's code of conduct by communicating with others about the competition – especially persons from one's own country or national federation".

Cycling

- Great Britain won the men's team pursuit in a new world record time of 3:51.659, beating Australia in the final to defend the title they won at the 2008 Games. New Zealand won the bronze.
- Victoria Pendleton of Great Britain took gold in the first Olympic women's keirin, China's Guo Shuang was second and Lee Wai-sze of Hong Kong, who only reached the second round via a repechage, won bronze.

Fencing

- South Korea won gold in the men's team sabre with Romania taking the silver and Italy earning the bronze.

Gymnastics

- China's Dong Dong won gold in the men's trampoline.

Judo

- Cuba's Idalys Ortiz won gold at women's +78 kg over Japan's Mika Sugimoto by judges' decision. Ortíz also defeated defending Olympic champion China's Tong Wen by yuko in the semi-final.
- Five time world champion France's Teddy Riner won gold at men's +100 kg over Russia's Alexander Mikhaylin by waza-ari.

Rowing

- Germany won the men's quadruple sculls with the same crew that won the 2011 World Championships, Croatia won silver and 2012 World Champions Australia took bronze.
- Three times world champions Hamish Bond and Eric Murray won the men's coxless pair for New Zealand.
- Great Britain won the women's double sculls through Anna Watkins and Katherine Grainger, Grainger having taken silver at three previous Olympic Games.
- Five time world champion, Mahé Drysdale of New Zealand won gold in the men's single sculls.

Shooting

- Sergei Martynov of Belarus set a new world record of 705.5 as he claimed gold in the men's 50 metre rifle prone.
- Leuris Pupo of Cuba won gold in the men's 25 metre rapid fire pistol equalling the world record of 34 in the final.

Swimming

- Missy Franklin of the United States set a new world record time of 2:04.06 to win gold in the women's 200 metre backstroke. Anastasia Zuyeva of Russia won the silver medal and Elizabeth Beisel, also of the United States, took bronze.
- Michael Phelps claimed his record 17th Olympics gold medal in the men's 100 metre butterfly. There was a dead heat for second place, with both Chad le Clos of South Africa and Yevgeny Korotyshkin of Russia receiving silver medals.
- Fifteen-year-old Katie Ledecky of the United States claimed gold in the women's 800 metre freestyle with Spain's Mireia Belmonte taking the silver medal and defending Olympic champion Rebecca Adlington of Great Britain earning the bronze.
- France's Florent Manaudou won gold in the men's 50 metre freestyle with Cullen Jones of the United States taking silver and Brazil's César Cielo finishing third for bronze.

Weightlifting

- Kazakhstan's Svetlana Podobedova took gold in the women's 75 kg, having lifted the same weight as silver medalist, Russia's Natalia Zabolotnaya, she was awarded the win based on her lighter weight by 220 grams. Iryna Kulesha of Belarus took bronze.
- Adrian Zieliński of Poland claimed gold in the men's 85 kg with Apti Aukhadov of Russia winning the silver medal after both lifted the same total weight the Pole took the title due to his lower bodyweight. Bronze went to Iran's Kianoush Rostami.

Gold medalists
Sport	Event	Competitor(s)	NOC	Rec	Ref
Archery	Men's individual	Oh Jin-Hyek	South Korea		
Athletics	Men's shot put	Tomasz Majewski	Poland		
Athletics	Women's 10,000 metres	Tirunesh Dibaba	Ethiopia		
Badminton	Mixed doubles	Zhang Nan, Zhao Yunlei	China		
Cycling	Men's team pursuit	Ed Clancy, Geraint Thomas, Steven Burke, Peter Kennaugh	Great Britain	WR	
Cycling	Women's keirin	Victoria Pendleton	Great Britain		
Fencing	Men's team sabre	Gu Bon-Gil, Won Woo-Young, Kim Jung-Hwan, Oh Eun-Seok	South Korea		
Gymnastics	Men's trampoline	Dong Dong	China		
Judo	Women's +78 kg	Idalys Ortiz	Cuba		
Judo	Men's +100 kg	Teddy Riner	France		
Rowing	Men's quadruple sculls	Karl Schulze, Philipp Wende, Lauritz Schoof, Tim Grohmann	Germany		
Rowing	Men's coxless pair	Eric Murray, Hamish Bond	New Zealand		
Rowing	Women's double sculls	Anna Watkins, Katherine Grainger	Great Britain		
Rowing	Men's single sculls	Mahé Drysdale	New Zealand		
Shooting	Men's 50 metre rifle prone	Sergei Martynov	Belarus	WR	
Shooting	Men's 25 metre rapid fire pistol	Leuris Pupo	Cuba	WR	
Swimming	Women's 200 metre backstroke	Missy Franklin	United States	WR	
Swimming	Men's 100 metre butterfly	Michael Phelps	United States		
Swimming	Women's 800 metre freestyle	Katie Ledecky	United States		
Swimming	Men's 50 metre freestyle	Florent Manaudou	France		
Weightlifting	Women's 75 kg	Svetlana Podobedova	Kazakhstan		
Weightlifting	Men's 85 kg	Adrian Zieliński	Poland		

=== Day 8: 4 August ===
Athletics

- Chen Ding of China claimed gold in the men's 20 kilometres walk with a new Olympic record time of 1:18.46. Erick Barrondo of Guatemala earned the silver medal and China's Wang Zhen took the bronze. Barrondo's medal was the first ever Olympic medal for Guatemala.
- Croatia's Sandra Perković won gold in the women's discus throw with Darya Pishchalnikova of Russia taking the silver and Li Yanfeng of China winning bronze.
- Great Britain's Jessica Ennis claimed gold in the women's heptathlon with a score of 6,955 points was 306 clear of silver medalist, Lilli Schwarzkopf of Germany, and 327 more than Russia's bronze medalist Tatyana Chernova.
- Great Britain's Greg Rutherford won gold in the men's long jump with a jump of 8.31 metres.
- Mo Farah of Great Britain won the men's 10,000 metres ahead of his training partner Galen Rupp of the United States, who won silver and third-placed Tariku Bekele of Ethiopia. Two-time defending Olympic champion Kenenisa Bekele, brother of Tariku, was fourth.
- Shelly-Ann Fraser-Pryce of Jamaica won the women's 100 metres, defending the title she won in 2008. American Carmelita Jeter was second and Jamaican Veronica Campbell-Brown third.

Badminton

- China's Li Xuerui took gold in the women's singles beating compatriot Wang Yihan in the final. Saina Nehwal of India took bronze after China's Wang Xin withdrew due to injury.
- In an event in which four pairs had been disqualified earlier in the Games, China won gold in the women's doubles with Tian Qing and Zhao Yunlei defeating Japan's Mizuki Fujii and Reika Kakiiwa. Russia's Valeria Sorokina and Nina Vislova claimed the bronze medal.

Cycling

- Great Britain trio Danielle King, Laura Trott and Joanna Rowsell won the gold medal in the women's team pursuit in a new world record time of 3:14.051. The United States claimed silver and Canada took bronze.

Fencing

- Third seeds China won the women's team épée, beating South Korea in the final. United States won the bronze after beating Russia in overtime.

Gymnastics

- Rosie MacLennan of Canada took gold in the women's trampoline with China's Huang Shanshan and He Wenna taking silver and bronze respectively.

Rowing

- Great Britain won gold in the men's coxless four; Tom James, Pete Reed and Andrew Triggs Hodge who each won gold in the event in 2008, were joined in the crew by Alex Gregory as Great Britain won the event for the fourth consecutive Games. Australia took the silver and the United States the bronze.
- Katherine Copeland and Sophie Hosking of Great Britain took gold in the women's lightweight double sculls, with China winning silver and Greece taking bronze.
- Denmark took gold in the men's lightweight double sculls final ahead of Great Britain who earned the silver with New Zealand claiming the bronze.
- Miroslava Knapková of the Czech Republic won gold in the women's single sculls with Fie Udby Erichsen of Denmark taking the silver and Kim Crow of Australia the bronze. The medal was the Czech Republic's first gold in rowing since gaining independence in 1993.

Shooting

- Jamie Lynn Gray of the United States won gold in the Women's 50 metre rifle three positions finals with a new Olympic record of 691.9. Serbia's Ivana Maksimović took the silver and Adéla Sýkorová of the Czech Republic won bronze.
- Italy's Jessica Rossi won gold in the women's trap with a new world record of 99. Zuzana Štefečeková of Slovakia and Delphine Réau of France took silver and bronze after a three way shoot off with San Marino's Alessandra Perilli who missed out on earning the country's first ever Olympic medal.

Swimming

- In the women's 50 metre freestyle, Ranomi Kromowidjojo of the Netherlands won her second gold medal of the Games with a new Olympic record time of 24.05. Aleksandra Gerasimenya of Belarus took silver and Marleen Veldhuis, also of the Netherlands, took bronze.
- China's Sun Yang broke his own world record with a time of 14:31.02 in winning gold in the men's 1500 metre freestyle. Ryan Cochrane of Canada won silver and Tunisia's Oussama Mellouli won bronze.
- The United States took gold in the Women's 4 × 100 metre medley relay with a new world record time of 3:52.05.
- The United States took gold in the men's 4 × 100 metre medley relay giving Michael Phelps his 18th Olympic gold medal.

Tennis

- Serena Williams won gold in the women's singles tournament for the United States, completing a career "Golden Slam" having already won all of tennis's grand slam events. She defeated Maria Sharapova of Russia, 6–0, 6–1. Victoria Azarenka of Belarus earns bronze, beating Maria Kirilenko, 6–3, 6–4, in the bronze medal match.
- Bob and Mike Bryan won the final of the men's doubles tournament, earning gold for the United States. They defeated Jo-Wilfried Tsonga and Michaël Llodra of France, 6–4, 7–6 (7–2). Julien Benneteau and Richard Gasquet of France earn bronze, beating David Ferrer and Feliciano López of Spain, 7–6 (7–4), 6–2.

Triathlon

- In the women's triathlon, a photo-finish was needed to determine Nicola Spirig of Switzerland as winner ahead of Sweden's Lisa Nordén, both being given the same time to 1/100th of a second. Erin Densham of Australia had also been involved in the final sprint and took the bronze medal.

Weightlifting

- Kazakhstan's Ilya Ilin took gold in the men's 94 kg setting a new world record of 233 kg in the clean and jerk and 418 kg in total weight.

Gold medalists
Sport	Event	Competitor(s)	NOC	Rec	Ref
Athletics	Women's heptathlon	Jessica Ennis	Great Britain		
Athletics	Men's 20 kilometres walk	Chen Ding	China	OR	
Athletics	Women's discus throw	Sandra Perković	Croatia		
Athletics	Men's long jump	Greg Rutherford	Great Britain		
Athletics	Men's 10,000 metres	Mo Farah	Great Britain		
Athletics	Women's 100 metres	Shelly-Ann Fraser-Pryce	Jamaica		
Badminton	Women's singles	Li Xuerui	China		
Badminton	Women's doubles	Tian Qing, Zhao Yunlei	China		
Cycling	Women's team pursuit	Danielle King, Laura Trott, Joanna Rowsell	Great Britain	WR	
Fencing	Women's team épée	Li Na, Luo Xiaojuan, Sun Yujie, Xu Anqi	China		
Gymnastics	Women's trampoline	Rosie MacLennan	Canada		
Rowing	Men's coxless four	Alex Gregory, Tom James, Pete Reed, Andrew Triggs Hodge	Great Britain		
Rowing	Women's lightweight double sculls	Katherine Copeland, Sophie Hosking	Great Britain		
Rowing	Men's lightweight double sculls	Mads Rasmussen, Rasmus Quist Hansen	Denmark		
Rowing	Women's single sculls	Miroslava Knapková	Czech Republic		
Shooting	Women's 50 metre rifle three positions	Jamie Lynn Gray	United States	OR	
Shooting	Women's trap	Jessica Rossi	Italy	WR	
Swimming	Women's 50 metre freestyle	Ranomi Kromowidjojo	Netherlands	OR	
Swimming	Men's 1500 metre freestyle	Sun Yang	China	WR	
Swimming	Women's 4 × 100 metre medley relay	Missy Franklin, Rebecca Soni, Dana Vollmer, Allison Schmitt; Heats: Rachel Bootsma, Breeja Larson, Claire Donahue, Jessica Hardy	United States	WR	
Swimming	Men's 4 × 100 metre medley relay	Matt Grevers, Brendan Hansen, Michael Phelps, Nathan Adrian; Heats: Nick Thoman, Eric Shanteau, Tyler McGill, Cullen Jones	United States		
Tennis	Women's singles	Serena Williams	United States		
Tennis	Men's doubles	Bob Bryan, Mike Bryan	United States		
Triathlon	Women's	Nicola Spirig	Switzerland		
Weightlifting	Men's 94 kg	Ilya Ilin	Kazakhstan	WR^{x2}	

=== Day 9: 5 August ===
Athletics

- In a race featuring the four fastest men in history, Jamaica's Usain Bolt ran 9.63 seconds, an Olympic record and the second fastest time ever recorded, to retain his men's 100 metres title. Bolt's compatriot Yohan Blake won silver and the United States' Justin Gatlin took bronze.
- Ezekiel Kemboi of Kenya won gold in the men's 3000 metres steeplechase ahead of Mahiedine Mekhissi-Benabbad from France and follow Kenyan Abel Mutai.
- Hungary's Krisztián Pars won gold in the men's hammer with a throw of 80.59 metres. Silver went to Primož Kozmus of Slovenia and bronze to Japan's Koji Murofushi.
- Sanya Richards-Ross of the United States won gold in the women's 400 metres in a time of 49.55 seconds. Silver went to 2008 gold medallist Christine Ohuruogu and bronze to American DeeDee Trotter.
- Tiki Gelana of Ethiopia set a new Olympic record time of 2:23.07 as she won the women's marathon. Kenyan Priscah Jeptoo won silver and bronze went to Tatyana Petrova Arkhipova of Russia.
- In the final of the women's triple jump Kazakhstan's Olga Rypakova jumped 14.98 metres to win the gold medal. Colombian jumper Caterine Ibargüen won silver and reigning world champion Olha Saladukha of Ukraine took bronze.

Badminton

- Lin Dan of China won gold in the men's singles, beating Malaysia's Lee Chong Wei, who took silver, in the final. China's Chen Long won bronze.
- Chinese pair Cai Yun and Fu Haifeng won gold in the men's doubles beating Denmark's Mathias Boe and Carsten Mogensen who took silver with Jung Jae-sung and Lee Yong-dae of South Korea taking bronze.

Boxing

- Women's boxing made its début at the Olympic Games, with Russia's Elena Savelyeva and North Korea's Kim Hye-Song facing each other in the first bout of the flyweight event.

Cycling

- Denmark's Lasse Norman Hansen won gold in the men's omnium as the event made its debut at the Olympics. France's Bryan Coquard won silver and Great Britain's Ed Clancy, who had already won gold in the team pursuit, took bronze.

Diving

- China's Wu Minxia won the gold in women's 3 metres springboard; the medal was her record equalling sixth in the sport of diving at the Olympics. He Zi, also from China took silver and Laura Sánchez of Mexico won the bronze.

Fencing

- Italy took gold in the men's team foil with Japan taking silver and Germany winning bronze.

Gymnastics

- In the men's floor Chinese gymnast Zou Kai successfully defended his gold medal. The silver medal went to Japan's Kōhei Uchimura and bronze to Russia's Denis Ablyazin
- Hungary's Krisztián Berki won gold in the men's pommel horse; Berki's overall score of 16.066 was tied with that of silver medalist Louis Smith of Great Britain, but he won gold based on a higher execution score. The bronze medal was won by Britain's Max Whitlock.
- Romania's Sandra Izbașa won gold in the women's vault ahead of silver medalist McKayla Maroney of the United States after the American failed to land her second vault. Maria Paseka of Russia won the bronze.

Sailing

- Great Britain's Ben Ainslie won the men's Finn class. This was his fourth consecutive Olympic gold medal and his fifth medal overall, making him the most successful sailor in Olympic history.
- Having been third going into the final medal race Fredrik Lööf and Max Salminen won gold for Sweden in the men's Star. Defending champions Iain Percy and Andrew Simpson of Great Britain won silver and Brazilian pair Robert Scheidt and Bruno Prada won bronze.

Shooting

- In the men's 50 metre Pistol Jin Jong-oh scored 662 points, beating fellow South Korean Choi Young-Rae to the gold medal by half a point.

Tennis

- In a repeat of the 2012 Wimbledon men's singles final Andy Murray faced Roger Federer in the final of the men's singles. Murray won 6–2, 6–1, 6–4 to take gold for Great Britain, with Federer taking silver for Switzerland. Juan Martín del Potro defeated Novak Djokovic 7–5, 6–4 in the Bronze medal match.
- Serena and Venus Williams won their third gold medal in the women's doubles tournament for the United States, defeating silver medalists Andrea Hlaváčková and Lucie Hradecká of the Czech Republic, 6–4, 6–4.
- Victoria Azarenka and Max Mirnyi won gold in the mixed doubles tournament, defeating silver medalists Andy Murray and Laura Robson of Great Britain, 2–6, 6–3, [10–8].

Weightlifting

- China's Zhou Lulu took gold in the women's +75 kg setting a new world record of 333 kg in the total weight, as well as an Olympic record of 187 kg in clean and jerk. Second placed Tatiana Kashirina of Russia set a new world record of 151 kg in the snatch.

Wrestling

- Iran's Hamid Sourian claimed gold in the men's Greco-Roman 55 kg beating Rovshan Bayramov of Azerbaijan in the final.
- Russia's Roman Vlasov won gold in the men's Greco-Roman 74 kg beating Arsen Julfalakyan of Armenia in the final.

Gold medalists
Sport	Event	Competitor(s)	NOC	Rec	Ref
Athletics	Men's 100 metres	Usain Bolt	Jamaica	OR	
Athletics	Men's 3000 metres steeplechase	Ezekiel Kemboi	Kenya		
Athletics	Men's hammer throw	Krisztián Pars	Hungary		
Athletics	Women's 400 metres	Sanya Richards-Ross	United States		
Athletics	Women's marathon	Tiki Gelana	Ethiopia	OR	
Athletics	Women's triple jump	Olga Rypakova	Kazakhstan		
Badminton	Men's singles	Lin Dan	China		
Badminton	Men's doubles	Cai Yun, Fu Haifeng	China		
Cycling	Men's omnium	Lasse Norman Hansen	Denmark		
Diving	Women's 3 metre springboard	Wu Minxia	China		
Fencing	Men's team foil	Valerio Aspromonte, Giorgio Avola, Andrea Baldini, Andrea Cassarà	Italy		
Gymnastics	Men's floor	Zou Kai	China		
Gymnastics	Men's pommel horse	Krisztián Berki	Hungary		
Gymnastics	Women's vault	Sandra Izbașa	Romania		
Sailing	Finn class	Ben Ainslie	Great Britain		
Sailing	Star class	Fredrik Lööf, Max Salminen	Sweden		
Shooting	Men's 50 metre pistol	Jin Jong-oh	South Korea		
Tennis	Men's singles	Andy Murray	Great Britain		
Tennis	Women's doubles	Serena Williams, Venus Williams	United States		
Tennis	Mixed doubles	Victoria Azarenka, Max Mirnyi	Belarus		
Weightlifting	Women's +75 kg	Zhou Lulu	China	WR / OR	
Wrestling	Men's Greco-Roman 55 kg	Hamid Sourian	Iran		
Wrestling	Men's Greco-Roman 74 kg	Roman Vlasov	Russia		

=== Day 10: 6 August ===
Athletics

- Jenn Suhr of the United States won the gold medal in the women's pole vault with Yarisley Silva of Cuba taking the silver and defending champion Yelena Isinbayeva of Russia earning bronze.
- Valerie Adams of New Zealand claimed gold in the women's shot put final. Yevgeniya Kolodko of Russia took silver and Gong Lijiao of China won the bronze, after Nadzeya Ostapchuk of Belarus, who had initially been awarded the gold, was stripped of the medal following a failed drug test.
- Félix Sánchez of the Dominican Republic regained the men's 400 metres hurdles title that he had first won at the 2004 Olympics finishing in a time of 47.63 seconds. American Michael Tinsley took silver and Javier Culson won bronze, becoming Puerto Rico's first Olympic medalist from a sport other than boxing.
- Reigning world champion Yuliya Zaripova of Russia took gold in the women's 3000 metres steeplechase with Habiba Ghribi of Tunisia taking the silver and Sofia Assefa of Ethiopia earning the bronze.
- In the men's 400 metres, Kirani James won gold, becoming Grenada's first ever Olympic medalist. Luguelín Santos of the Dominican Republic won silver and bronze went to Trinidad and Tobago's Lalonde Gordon.

Cycling

- Great Britain's Jason Kenny beat Grégory Baugé of France in the final of the men's sprint to win his second gold medal of the Games.

Equestrian

- The Great Britain quartet of Scott Brash, Peter Charles, Ben Maher and Nick Skelton took gold in the team show jumping after winning a jump-off against the Netherlands who took silver. Saudi Arabia won the bronze medal.

Gymnastics

- Arthur Zanetti of Brazil won gold in the men's rings with Chen Yibing of China taking silver and Matteo Morandi of Italy winning bronze.
- Russia's Aliya Mustafina won gold in the women's uneven bars with He Kexin of China taking silver and Great Britain's Beth Tweddle winning bronze.
- Yang Hak-Seon of South Korea took gold in the men's vault. Silver went to Denis Ablyazin of Russia with Ukraine's Ihor Radivilov taking bronze.

Sailing

- Xu Lijia of China won gold in the women's Laser Radial class with Marit Bouwmeester of the Netherlands taking the silver and Belgium's Evi Van Acker earning bronze.
- Tom Slingsby of Australia won gold in the men's Laser class with Pavlos Kontides of Cyprus earning silver and Rasmus Myrgren of Sweden taking bronze.

Shooting

- Italy's Niccolò Campriani won gold in the men's 50 metre rifle three positions, setting an Olympic record during the qualifying round.
- Croatia's Giovanni Cernogoraz won gold in the men's trap after beating Italy's Massimo Fabbrizi in a shoot-off. Kuwait's Fehaid Al-Deehani also needed a shoot-off to win the bronze medal.

Weightlifting

- Oleksiy Torokhtiy of Ukraine lifted a total of 412 kg to win the men's 105 kg division by 1 kg from silver medalist Navab Nassirshalal of Iran. Poland's Bartłomiej Bonk won bronze.

Wrestling

- Omid Norouzi of Iran defeated Georgia's Revaz Lashkhi in the final of the men's Greco-Roman 60 kg event. Bronze medals went to Zaur Kuramagomedov of Russia and Ryūtarō Matsumoto of Japan.
- Russian Alan Khugayev won gold in the men's Greco-Roman 84 kg event, defeating Karam Gaber of Egypt 1–0, 2–0 in the final.
- Cuba's Mijaín López retained his Olympic title in the Men's Greco-Roman 120 kg as he defeated Heiki Nabi of Estonia in the final. The two bronze medals were won by reigning world champion, Rıza Kayaalp of Turkey, and Sweden's Johan Eurén.

Gold medalists
Sport	Event	Competitor(s)	NOC	Rec	Ref
Athletics	Women's pole vault	Jenn Suhr	United States		
Athletics	Women's shot put	Valerie Adams	New Zealand		
Athletics	Men's 400 metres hurdles	Félix Sánchez	Dominican Republic		
Athletics	Women's 3000 metres steeplechase	Yuliya Zaripova	Russia		
Athletics	Men's 400 metres	Kirani James	Grenada		
Cycling	Men's sprint	Jason Kenny	Great Britain		
Equestrian	Team jumping	Scott Brash, Peter Charles, Ben Maher, Nick Skelton	Great Britain		
Gymnastics	Men's rings	Arthur Zanetti	Brazil		
Gymnastics	Women's uneven bars	Aliya Mustafina	Russia		
Gymnastics	Men's vault	Yang Hak-Seon	South Korea		
Sailing	Women's Laser Radial class	Xu Lijia	China		
Sailing	Men's Laser class	Tom Slingsby	Australia		
Shooting	Men's 50 metre rifle three positions	Niccolò Campriani	Italy	OR	
Shooting	Men's trap	Giovanni Cernogoraz	Croatia	OR	
Weightlifting	Men's 105 kg	Oleksiy Torokhtiy	Ukraine		
Wrestling	Men's Greco-Roman 60 kg	Omid Norouzi	Iran		
Wrestling	Men's Greco-Roman 84 kg	Alan Khugayev	Russia		
Wrestling	Men's Greco-Roman 120 kg	Mijaín López	Cuba		

=== Day 11: 7 August ===
Athletics

- Russian Ivan Ukhov won gold in the men's high jump by clearing a height of 2.38 m. American Erik Kynard took silver after jumping 2.33 m. Six athletes finished tied on 2.29 m but only three were awarded joint bronze due to clearing the height in less attempts; Mutaz Essa Barshim of Qatar, Derek Drouin of Canada and Robert Grabarz of Great Britain earned the medals.
- Robert Harting of Germany threw 68.27 m to win gold in the men's discus throw and extend his unbeaten record stretching back to August 2010. Ehsan Haddadi of Iran won silver and defending Olympic champion Gerd Kanter of Estonia won bronze.
- Sally Pearson of Australia won the women's 100 metres hurdles final in an Olympic Record time of 12.35, over Dawn Harper of the United States by 0.02 seconds. She was also the first Australian female athlete to clinch a gold medal in the track and field since Cathy Freeman in 2000.
- Taoufik Makhloufi won gold in the men's 1500 metres. Makhloufi had been expelled from the Games for not trying in his 800 metres heat but was reinstated after medical evidence was produced to prove he had an injury.

Cycling

- Laura Trott of Great Britain won her second gold medal of the Games, adding the women's omnium title to her victory in the team pursuit.
- Australia's Anna Meares beat Great Britain's Victoria Pendleton in the final of the women's sprint.
- Chris Hoy won gold in the men's keirin, Maximilian Levy of Germany took silver and there was a dead heat for the bronze with Teun Mulder of the Netherlands and Simon van Velthooven of New Zealand each awarded a medal. This was Hoy's sixth Olympic gold medal, making him the British athlete with the most Olympic golds, and his seventh total medal, tying him with Bradley Wiggins for the record for a British Olympian.

Diving

- Ilya Zakharov of Russia became the first non-Chinese diver to win the gold in the men's 3 metre springboard with a total score of 555.90. Chinese divers Kai Qin and He Chong won silver and bronze respectively.

Equestrian

- Carl Hester, Laura Bechtolsheimer and Charlotte Dujardin, won Great Britain's first ever medal in Olympic dressage by taking gold in the team event. The German team, winners of the event at the previous seven Summer Games won silver and bronze went to the Netherlands.

Gymnastics

- In the men's parallel bars final Chinese gymnast Feng Zhe scored 15.966 to win gold ahead of Germany's Marcel Nguyen (15.800) and France's Hamilton Sabot (15.566), who won silver and bronze respectively.
- China's Deng Linlin (15.600) won gold in the women's balance beam final with silver going to fellow Chinese gymnast Sui Lu (15.500). Cătălina Ponor of Romania was initially placed third with 15.066 but, following an appeal, American Aly Raisman had her score raised from 14.966 to 15.066 enough to take her ahead of Ponor for the bronze medal based on a higher execution score.
- Epke Zonderland became the first male Dutch gymnast to win an Olympic medal with gold in the horizontal bar. Germany's Fabian Hambüchen won silver and China's defending Olympic and world champion, Zou Kai, won bronze.
- United States' Aly Raisman added to her team gold and balance beam bronze by taking gold in the women's floor event with a score of 15.600. Romanian Cătălina Ponor took silver with 15.200 and bronze went to Russia's Aliya Mustafina (14.900).

Sailing

- Dorian van Rijsselberghe of the Netherlands won the men's sailboard, the Dutchman went into the final medal race with the gold medal already assured. Great Britain's Nick Dempsey won silver and bronze went to Poland's Przemysław Miarczyński.
- Spain's Marina Alabau won gold in the women's sailboard ahead of Finland's silver medalist Tuuli Petäjä and Zofia Klepacka of Poland, who took bronze.

Synchronized swimming

- Russia's Natalia Ishchenko and Svetlana Romashina won gold in the women's duet with a score of 197.100 points. Spain's Ona Carbonell and Andrea Fuentes won silver, bronze went to China's Huang Xuechen and Liu Ou.

Table tennis

- The Chinese trio of Ding Ning, Li Xiaoxia and Guo Yue won gold in the women's team event, defeating Ai Fukuhara, Sayaka Hirano and Kasumi Ishikawa of Japan by three matches to nil. The team from Singapore finished third after beating South Korea three matches to nil in the bronze medal final.

Triathlon

- Alistair Brownlee of Great Britain won gold in the men's triathlon, silver went to Spain's Javier Gómez and bronze to Alaistair's brother Jonathan Brownlee. The Brownlees became the first brothers to share the podium in an individual event in over 100 years.

Weightlifting

- Iran completed a one-two in the men's +105 kg event as Behdad Salimi won gold and Sajjad Anoushiravani won silver. The bronze medal was won by Ruslan Albegov of Russia. Germany's Matthias Steiner, the defending Olympic champion, was sent to hospital for x-rays after he dropped the barbell on his head and neck while attempting to lift 196 kg.

Wrestling

- South Korea's Kim Hyeon-Woo defeated Hungary's Tamás Lőrincz in the final of the men's Greco-Roman 66 kg. Bronze medals went to defending Olympic champion Steeve Guénot of France and to Georgia's Manuchar Tskhadaia.
- Iranian Ghasem Rezaei won gold in the men's Greco-Roman 96 kg after he defeated Russia's Rustam Totrov by a score of 2–0 1–0 in the final. Bronze medals were won by Armenian Artur Aleksanyan and Jimmy Lidberg of Sweden.

Gold medalists
Sport	Event	Competitor(s)	NOC	Rec	Ref
Athletics	Men's high jump	Ivan Ukhov	Russia		
Athletics	Men's discus throw	Robert Harting	Germany		
Athletics	Women's 100 metres hurdles	Sally Pearson	Australia	OR	
Athletics	Men's 1500 metres	Taoufik Makhloufi	Algeria		
Cycling	Women's omnium	Laura Trott	Great Britain		
Cycling	Women's sprint	Anna Meares	Australia		
Cycling	Men's keirin	Chris Hoy	Great Britain		
Diving	Men's 3 metre springboard	Ilya Zakharov	Russia		
Equestrian	Team dressage	Carl Hester, Laura Bechtolsheimer, Charlotte Dujardin	Great Britain		
Gymnastics	Men's parallel bars	Feng Zhe	China		
Gymnastics	Women's balance beam	Deng Linlin	China		
Gymnastics	Men's horizontal bar	Epke Zonderland	Netherlands		
Gymnastics	Women's floor	Aly Raisman	United States		
Sailing	Men's sailboard	Dorian van Rijsselberghe	Netherlands		
Sailing	Women's sailboard	Marina Alabau	Spain		
Synchronized swimming	Women's duet	Natalia Ishchenko, Svetlana Romashina	Russia		
Table tennis	Women's team	Ding Ning, Guo Yue, Li Xiaoxia	China		
Triathlon	Men's	Alistair Brownlee	Great Britain		
Weightlifting	Men's +105 kg	Behdad Salimi	Iran		
Wrestling	Men's Greco-Roman 66 kg	Kim Hyeon-Woo	South Korea		
Wrestling	Men's Greco-Roman 96 kg	Ghasem Rezaei	Iran		

=== Day 12: 8 August ===
Athletics

- Brittney Reese of the United States jumped 7.12 meters to win gold in the women's long jump. Russia's Elena Sokolova won the silver medal and American Janay DeLoach won the bronze.
- Natalya Antyukh of Russia won gold in the women's 400 metres hurdles; her time of 52.70 seconds missed the Olympic record by 0.06 seconds. American world champion Lashinda Demus won silver and the bronze went to Zuzana Hejnová of the Czech Republic.
- Allyson Felix of the United States won gold in the women's 200 metres after winning silver in the event at the previous two Summer Olympics. Silver went to Jamaica's 100 metres champion, Shelly-Ann Fraser-Pryce and bronze was won by American Carmelita Jeter.
- The United States' Aries Merritt ran a time 12.92 seconds as he won the men's 110 metres hurdles final, fellow American Jason Richardson, the reigning world champion, was second in 13.04 seconds and the bronze medal was won by Jamaican Hansle Parchment in 13.12 seconds.

Canoeing

- Eirik Verås Larsen of Norway won gold in the men's K-1 1000 metres in a time of 3:26.462. Adam van Koeverden of Canada was second in a time of 3:27.170 followed by Germany's Max Hoff in 3:27.759.
- Sebastian Brendel of Germany finished in a time of 3:47.176 to win gold in the men's C-1 1000 metres final. David Cal of Spain finished nearly a second behind the winner to take silver and Canada's Mark Oldershaw won the bronze.
- Hungarian pair Rudolf Dombi and Roland Kökény added the Olympic gold medal to their European title in the men's K-2 1000 metres. Fernando Pimenta and Emanuel Silva of Portugal won the nation's first ever Olympic medaling in sprint canoeing as they took silver ahead of the German defending Olympic champions Martin Hollstein and Andreas Ihle who won bronze.
- In the women's K-4 500 metres the Hungarian quartet of Gabriella Szabó, Danuta Kozák, Katalin Kovács and Krisztina Fazekas Zur won gold to end a run of four straight Olympic titles in the event for Germany, who won the silver medal. Bronze went to the team from Belarus.

Equestrian

- Steve Guerdat took the gold medal in individual jumping, while Dutch rider Gerco Schröder took silver and Ireland's Cian O'Connor took bronze. Guerdat became the first Swiss rider to win an Olympic title in show jumping since Alphonse Gemuseus in 1924.

Sailing

- Australia's Nathan Outteridge and Iain Jensen had an unassailable lead going into the final of the 49er class, picking up the gold medal from the New Zealand pair of Peter Burling and Blair Tuke.

Table tennis

- China won the men's team event to complete a sweep of all the table tennis gold medals for the second consecutive Olympics. The Chinese team of Zhang Jike, Ma Long and Wang Hao defeated their South Korean opponents, Oh Sang-Eun, Joo Se-Hyuk and Ryu Seung-Min by a score of 3–0 in the final. Bronze went to Germany.

Taekwondo

- Wu Jingyu of China successfully defended her Olympic title in the women's 49 kg event by defeating Spain's Brigitte Yagüe by a score of 8–1 in the final. Bronze medals were awarded to Thailand's Chanatip Sonkham and Croatia's Lucija Zaninović.
- World and European champion Joel González Bonilla of Spain became Olympic champion in the men's 58 kg; he defeated South Korean Lee Dae-Hoon by a score of 17–8 in the final to take gold. Russian Aleksey Denisenko and Colombian Óscar Muñoz won bronze medals.

Volleyball

- Misty May-Treanor and Kerri Walsh of the United States defeated fellow Americans Jennifer Kessy and April Ross in the women's beach volleyball final, 21–16, 21–16, to win their third consecutive Olympic gold medal. Juliana Silva and Larissa França of Brazil defeated Xue Chen and Zhang Xi of China, 11–21, 21–19, 15–12, for the bronze medal.

Wrestling

- Japan's eight-time world champion Hitomi Obara won gold in the women's freestyle 48 kg having dropped down a weight division in order to compete in the Olympics for the first time. Mariya Stadnik of Azerbaijan won silver, bronze medals were awarded to American Clarissa Chun and Canadian Carol Huynh.
- Kaori Icho of Japan became the first female wrestler to win three Olympic gold medals by beating Jing Ruixue of China 3–0, 2–0, in the final of the women's freestyle 63 kg. Lubov Volosova of Russia and Soronzonboldyn Battsetseg of Mongolia won the bronze medals.

Gold medalists
Sport	Event	Competitor(s)	NOC	Rec	Ref
Athletics	Women's long jump	Brittney Reese	United States		
Athletics	Women's 400 metres hurdles	Natalya Antyukh	Russia		
Athletics	Women's 200 metres	Allyson Felix	United States		
Athletics	Men's 110 metres hurdles	Aries Merritt	United States		
Canoeing	Men's K-1 1000 metres	Eirik Verås Larsen	Norway		
Canoeing	Men's C-1 1000 metres	Sebastian Brendel	Germany		
Canoeing	Men's K-2 1000 metres	Rudolf Dombi, Roland Kökény	Hungary		
Canoeing	Women's K-4 500 metres	Gabriella Szabó, Danuta Kozák, Katalin Kovács, Krisztina Fazekas Zur	Hungary		
Equestrian	Individual jumping	Steve Guerdat	Switzerland		
Sailing	49er class	Nathan Outteridge, Iain Jensen	Australia		
Table tennis	Men's team	Zhang Jike, Ma Long, Wang Hao	China		
Taekwondo	Women's 49 kg	Wu Jingyu	China		
Taekwondo	Men's 58 kg	Joel González	Spain		
Volleyball	Women's beach	Misty May-Treanor, Kerri Walsh	United States		
Wrestling	Women's freestyle 48 kg	Hitomi Obara	Japan		
Wrestling	Women's freestyle 63 kg	Kaori Icho	Japan		

=== Day 13: 9 August ===
Athletics

- United States' Christian Taylor and Will Claye took gold and silver in the men's triple jump. Taylor's jump of 17.81 metres was a world leading distance for 2012. Italy's Fabrizio Donato won bronze.
- Kenya's David Rudisha broke his own world record to win gold in the men's 800 metres in a time of 1:40.91. Nijel Amos of Botswana won the silver medal, his nation's first Olympic medal in any sport. Bronze was won by Kenya's Timothy Kitum. Of the eight competitors in the final seven of them ran personal bests, two of which were new national records. Sebastian Coe, the chairman of the London Organising Committee of the Olympic and Paralympic Games and a former Olympic 800 metres champion himself, described Rudisha's run as "the performance of the Games, not just of track and field but of the Games".
- In the men's 200 metres, Jamaica swept the medals with Usain Bolt taking gold in 19.32 seconds, Yohan Blake silver in 19.44, and Warren Weir bronze with 19.84. Bolt became the first man to win the 200 metres in two Olympics and the first to win the 100 and 200m races double in two Olympics.
- The world record holder in women's javelin throw, the Czech Republic's Barbora Špotáková, won gold with a 69.55 metre throw. Germany's Christina Obergföll took silver with 65.16 m and Linda Stahl took bronze with 64.91 m.
- The United States' Ashton Eaton and Trey Hardee took gold and silver respectively in the men's decathlon. Cuba's Leonel Suárez won the bronze.
- In the heats of the men's 4 × 400m relay, United States leadoff runner Manteo Mitchell broke his leg near the 200 m mark but managed to finish the race. The United States tied for first with the Bahamas to qualify for the final.

Boxing

- Great Britain's Nicola Adams won the first ever women's Olympic boxing gold medal, defeating Ren Cancan of China 16–7 in the final of the flyweight division. Bronze medals went to Mary Kom of India and the United States' Marlen Esparza.
- Katie Taylor of Ireland defeated Russia's Sofya Ochigava 16–8 to win the gold medal in the women's lightweight.
- Seventeen-year-old American Claressa Shields won gold in the women's middleweight, defeating Russia's Nadezda Torlopova by a score of 19–12 in the final.

Canoeing

- Germany's Peter Kretschmer and Kurt Kuschela won the men's C-2 1000 metres ahead of defending Olympic champions Andrei and Aliaksandr Bahdanovich of Belarus. Bronze went to Alexey Korovashkov and Ilya Pervukhin of Russia.
- Australia beat out Hungary and the Czech Republic in the final of the men's K-4 1000 metres.
- Hungary's two-time European champion Danuta Kozák won gold in the women's K-1 500 metres. Ukraine's defending Olympic champion Inna Osypenko won silver and Bridgitte Hartley of South Africa won bronze.
- German pair Franziska Weber and Tina Dietze won the gold medal in the women's K-2 500 metres. Hungary's Katalin Kovacs and Natasa Douchev-Janics won silver and bronze went to Poland's Beata Mikolajczyk and Karolina Naja.

Diving

- China's Chen Ruolin won her second consecutive gold medal in the Women's 10 metre platform.

Equestrian

- Great Britain's Charlotte Dujardin and Laura Bechtolsheimer added to the gold medals they won in the team dressage by taking gold and bronze respectively in the individual dressage. Dujardin, the final competitor to ride, set a new Olympic record score of 90.089% to knock the Netherlands Adelinde Cornelissen into silver medal position.

Football

- The United States defend their Olympic title in the women's football tournament by defeating world champions Japan 2–1 in a rematch of the 2011 FIFA Women's World Cup Final with Carli Lloyd scoring both goals. Canada won the bronze medal with a 1–0 victory over France.

Swimming

- Hungary's Éva Risztov led for most of the race as she won gold in the women's marathon. American Haley Anderson won silver and Italy's Martina Grimaldi held off the reigning world champion, Britain's Keri-Anne Payne, to win the bronze.

Taekwondo

- Jade Jones of Great Britain beat China's Hou Yuzhuo 6–4 in the final of the women's 57 kg division to claim her nation's first ever Olympic taekwondo gold medal. Bronze medals went to France's Marlène Harnois and Tseng Li-Cheng of Chinese Taipei.
- World number one Servet Tazegül of Turkey won the gold medal in the men's 68 kg after he defeated Iran's Mohammad Bagheri Motamed 6–4 in the final. Bronze medals were won by Terrence Jennings of the United States and Afghanistan's Rohullah Nikpai, who matched his result from 2008 when he won his nation's first ever Olympic medal.

Volleyball

- Men's beach final at 21:00.

Water polo

- The United States won the gold medal in the women's event after an 8–5 victory over Spain in the final.

Wrestling

- Women's freestyle 55 kg final at 19:03.
- Women's freestyle 72 kg final at 19:48.

Gold medalists
Sport	Event	Competitor(s)	NOC	Rec	Ref
Athletics	Men's triple jump	Christian Taylor	United States		
Athletics	Men's 800 metres	David Rudisha	Kenya	WR	
Athletics	Men's 200 metres	Usain Bolt	Jamaica		
Athletics	Women's javelin throw	Barbora Špotáková	Czech Republic		
Athletics	Men's decathlon	Ashton Eaton	United States		
Boxing	Women's flyweight	Nicola Adams	Great Britain		
Boxing	Women's lightweight	Katie Taylor	Ireland		
Boxing	Women's middleweight	Claressa Shields	United States		
Canoeing	Men's C-2 1000 metres	Peter Kretschmer, Kurt Kuschela	Germany		
Canoeing	Men's K-4 1000 metres	Tate Smith, Dave Smith, Murray Stewart, Jacob Clear	Australia		
Canoeing	Women's K-1 500 metres	Danuta Kozák	Hungary		
Canoeing	Women's K-2 500 metres	Franziska Weber, Tina Dietze	Germany		
Diving	Women's 10 metre platform	Chen Ruolin	China		
Equestrian	Individual dressage	Charlotte Dujardin	Great Britain	OR	
Football	Women's	Hope Solo, Heather Mitts, Christie Rampone, Becky Sauerbrunn, Kelley O'Hara, Amy LePeilbet, Shannon Boxx, Amy Rodriguez, Heather O'Reilly, Carli Lloyd, Sydney Leroux, Lauren Cheney, Alex Morgan, Abby Wambach, Megan Rapinoe, Rachel Buehler, Tobin Heath, Nicole Barnhart	United States		
Swimming	Women's marathon	Éva Risztov	Hungary		
Taekwondo	Women's 57 kg	Jade Jones	Great Britain		
Taekwondo	Men's 68 kg	Servet Tazegül	Turkey		
Volleyball	Men's beach	Julius Brink, Jonas Reckermann	Germany		
Water polo	Women's	Elizabeth Armstrong, Heather Petri, Melissa Seidemann, Brenda Villa, Lauren Wenger, Maggie Steffens, Courtney Mathewson, Jessica Steffens, Elsie Windes, Kelly Rulon, Annika Dries, Kami Craig, Tumua Anae	United States		
Wrestling	Women's freestyle 55 kg	Saori Yoshida	Japan		
Wrestling	Women's freestyle 72 kg	Natalia Vorobieva	Russia		

=== Day 14: 10 August ===
Athletics

- Renaud Lavillenie set an Olympic record of 5.97 metres, and became the third French man to win gold in the men's pole vault. Bjorn Otto and Raphael Holzdeppe, both from Germany, claimed the silver and bronze, respectively.
- Women's hammer throw final at 19:35.
- Women's 5000 metres final at 20:05.
- Women's 4 × 100 metres relay final at 20:40.
- Women's 1500 metres finals at 20:55.
- Men's 4 × 400 metres relay final at 21:20.

Cycling

- Maris Strombergs became the first Latvian athlete to win two Olympic medals and successfully defended his Olympic title in the men's BMX event.
- Colombia's Mariana Pajón won gold at the women's BMX event, and first for her nation since 2000.

Field hockey

- The Netherlands defeat Argentina 2–0 in the final of the women's tournament to defend their Olympic title. Hosts Great Britain defeat New Zealand 3–1 in the bronze medal match.

Football

- South Korea beat Japan 2–0 to win the bronze medal match in the men's football tournament.

Sailing

- Men's 470 class final at 12:00.
- Women's 470 class final at 14:00.

Swimming

- Men's marathon final at 12:00.

Synchronized swimming

- Women's team final at 15:00.

Taekwondo

- South Korea's Hwang Kyung-Seon successfully defended her Olympic title by beating European champion Nur Tatar of Turkey in the final of the women's 67 kg event. The two bronze medals were won by Paige McPherson of the United States, and Germany's Helena Fromm.
- Sebastián Crismanich of Argentina defeated Spain's Nicolás García in the gold medal bout of the men's 80 kg. Bronze medals were won by Great Britain's Lutalo Muhammad and Italy's Mauro Sarmiento.

Wrestling

- Men's freestyle 55 kg.
- Men's freestyle 74 kg.

Gold medalists
Sport	Event	Competitor(s)	NOC	Rec	Ref
Athletics	Men's pole vault	Renaud Lavillenie	France	OR	
Athletics	Women's hammer throw	Tatyana Lysenko	Russia	OR	
Athletics	Women's 5000 metres	Meseret Defar	Ethiopia		
Athletics	Women's 4 × 100 metres relay	Tianna Madison, Allyson Felix, Bianca Knight, Carmelita Jeter; Heats: Jeneba Tarmoh, Lauryn Williams	United States	WR	
Athletics	Women's 1500 metres	Aslı Çakır Alptekin	Turkey		
Athletics	Men's 4 × 400 metres relay	Ramon Miller, Demetrius Pinder, Michael Mathieu, Chris Brown	Bahamas		
Cycling	Men's BMX	Māris Štrombergs	Latvia		
Cycling	Women's BMX	Mariana Pajón	Colombia		
Field hockey	Women's	Kitty van Male, Carlien Dirkse van den Heuvel, Willemijn Bos, Kelly Jonker, Maartje Goderie, Lidewij Welten, Maartje Paumen, Naomi van As, Ellen Hoog, Sophie Polkamp, Joyce Sombroek, Kim Lammers, Eva de Goede, Marilyn Agliotti, Merel de Blaeij, Margot van Geffen	Netherlands		
Sailing	Men's 470 class	Mathew Belcher, Malcolm Page	Australia		
Sailing	Women's 470 class	Jo Aleh, Polly Powrie	New Zealand		
Swimming	Men's marathon	Oussama Mellouli	Tunisia		
Synchronized swimming	Women's team	Anastasia Davydova, Mariya Gromova; Natalia Ishchenko, Elvira Khasyanova; Daria Korobova, Alexandra Patskevich; Svetlana Romashina, Angelika Timanina; Alla Shishkina	Russia		
Taekwondo	Women's 67 kg	Hwang Kyung-Seon	South Korea		
Taekwondo	Men's 80 kg	Sebastián Crismanich	Argentina		
Wrestling	Men's freestyle 55 kg	Dzhamal Otarsultanov	Russia		
Wrestling	Men's freestyle 74 kg	Jordan Burroughs	United States		

=== Day 15: 11 August ===
Athletics

- Men's 50 kilometres walk finals at 09:00.
- Women's 20 kilometres walk final at 17:00.
- Women's high jump final at 19:00.
- Keshorn Walcott (Trinidad and Tobago) became the first non-European athlete to win a gold medal in the men's javelin throw since Cy Young in 1952, and the first Trinidadian in a field event and in any Olympic event since Hasely Crawford in 1976.
- Men's 5000 metres final at 19:30.
- Women's 800 metres final at 20:00.
- Women's 4 × 400 metres relay final at 20:25.
- Men's 4 × 100 metres relay final at 21:00.

Basketball

- Women finals at 21:00.

Boxing

- Men's light flyweight final at 20:30.
- Men's bantamweight final at 20:45.
- Men's light welterweight final at 21:15.
- Men's heavyweight final at 21:30.
- Men's middleweight final at 21:45.

Canoeing

- Men's K-1 200 metres final at 09:30.
- Men's C-1 200 metres final at 09:47.
- Women's K-1 200 metres final at 10:14.
- Men's K-2 200 metres final at 10:41.

Cycling

- Women's cross-country finals at 12:30.

Diving

- David Boudia became the first American diver to win a gold medal in the men's 10 metre platform since Greg Louganis in 1988.

Field hockey

- Germany defeat The Netherlands 2–1 in the final of the men's tournament to defend their Olympic title. Australia win the bronze medal after defeating hosts Great Britain 3–1 in the bronze medal match.

Football

- Mexico win the gold medal in the men's football tournament for the very first time after beating Brazil 2–1 in the final which saw the fastast goal scored in Men's Olympic Final history when Oribe Peralta scored in the opening minute and also went on to score the winning goal.

Gymnastics

- Women's rhythmic individual all-around Evgeniya Kanaeva from Russian Federation wins the individual all-around title for the second time and thereby becoming the only rhythmic gymnast in history to claim more than a single gold medal in the discipline, winning by a wide margin of 2.4 ahead of fellow Russian Daria Dmitrieva with a score of 116.900.

Handball

- Women's final at 20:30.

Modern pentathlon

- Men's final at 08:45.

Sailing

- Elliott 6m final at 13:05.

Taekwondo

- Women's +67 kg final at 22:15.
- Men's +80 kg final at 22:30.

Volleyball

- Women's final at 18:30.

Wrestling

- Men's freestyle 60 kg.
- Men's freestyle 84 kg.
- Men's freestyle 120 kg.

Gold medalists
Sport	Event	Competitor(s)	NOC	Rec	Ref
Athletics	Men's 50 kilometres walk	Sergey Kirdyapkin	Russia	OR	
Athletics	Women's 20 kilometres walk	Elena Lashmanova	Russia	WR	
Athletics	Women's high jump	Anna Chicherova	Russia		
Athletics	Men's javelin throw	Keshorn Walcott	Trinidad and Tobago		
Athletics	Men's 5000 metres	Mo Farah	Great Britain		
Athletics	Women's 800 metres	Mariya Savinova	Russia		
Athletics	Women's 4 × 400 metres relay	Allyson Felix, DeeDee Trotter; Francena McCorory, Sanya Richards-Ross; Heats: Keshia Baker, Diamond Dixon	United States		
Athletics	Men's 4 × 100 metres relay	Nesta Carter, Michael Frater; Yohan Blake, Usain Bolt; Heats: Kemar Bailey-Cole	Jamaica	WR	
Basketball	Women's	Lindsay Whalen, Seimone Augustus, Sue Bird, Maya Moore, Angel McCoughtry, Asjha Jones, Tamika Catchings, Swin Cash; Diana Taurasi, Sylvia Fowles; Tina Charles, Candace Parker	United States		
Boxing	Men's light flyweight	Zou Shiming	China		
Boxing	Men's bantamweight	Luke Campbell	Great Britain		
Boxing	Men's light welterweight	Roniel Iglesias	Cuba		
Boxing	Men's middleweight	Ryōta Murata	Japan		
Boxing	Men's heavyweight	Oleksandr Usyk	Ukraine		
Canoeing	Men's K-1 200 metres	Ed McKeever	Great Britain		
Canoeing	Men's C-1 200 metres	Yuriy Cheban	Ukraine		
Canoeing	Women's K-1 200 metres	Lisa Carrington	New Zealand		
Canoeing	Men's K-2 200 metres	Yury Postrigay; Alexander Dyachenko	Russia		
Cycling	Women's cross-country	Julie Bresset	France		
Diving	Men's 10 metre platform	David Boudia	United States		
Field hockey	Men's	Maximilian Müller, Martin Häner, Oskar Deecke, Christopher Wesley, Moritz Fürste, Tobias Hauke, Jan-Philipp Rabente, Benjamin Weß, Timo Weß, Oliver Korn, Christopher Zeller, Max Weinhold, Matthias Witthaus, Florian Fuchs, Philipp Zeller, Thilo Stralkowski	Germany		
Football	Men's	Javier Aquino, Dárvin Chávez, José de Jesús Corona, Javier Cortés, Giovani dos Santos, Jorge Enríquez, Marco Fabián, Héctor Herrera, Israel Jiménez, Raúl Jiménez, Hiram Mier, Oribe Peralta, Miguel Ponce, Diego Reyes, Carlos Salcido, Néstor Vidrio	Mexico		
Gymnastics	Women's rhythmic individual all-around	Yevgeniya Kanayeva	Russia		
Handball	Women's	Kari Aalvik Grimsbø, Karoline Næss, Ida Alstad, Kari Mette Johansen, Tonje Nøstvold, Karoline Dyhre Breivang, Kristine Lunde-Borgersen, Heidi Løke, Marit Malm Frafjord, Linn Jørum Sulland, Katrine Lunde Haraldsen, Camilla Herrem, Gøril Snorroeggen, Amanda Kurtović, Linn-Kristin Riegelhuth Koren	Norway		
Modern pentathlon	Men's	David Svoboda	Czech Republic		
Sailing	Elliott 6m	Támara Echegoyen, Ángela Pumariega, Sofía Toro	Spain		
Taekwondo	Women's +67 kg	Milica Mandić	Serbia		
Taekwondo	Men's +80 kg	Carlo Molfetta	Italy		
Volleyball	Women's	Fabiana Claudino, Dani Lins, Paula Pequeno, Adenízia da Silva, Thaísa Menezes, Jaqueline Carvalho, Fernanda Ferreira, Tandara Caixeta, Natália Pereira, Sheilla Castro, Fabiana de Oliveira, Fernanda Garay	Brazil		
Wrestling	Men's freestyle 60 kg	Toghrul Asgarov	Azerbaijan		
Wrestling	Men's freestyle 84 kg	Sharif Sharifov	Azerbaijan		
Wrestling	Men's freestyle 120 kg	Artur Taymazov	Uzbekistan		

=== Day 16: 12 August ===
Athletics

- Stephen Kiprotich of Uganda won the gold medal in the men's marathon and was the first gold medal winner for the country since the 1972 Summer Olympic Games.

Basketball

- The United States successfully defended their Olympic title in the men's basketball final after beating Spain in a rematch of the 2008 final, 107–100, in a closely fought game.

Boxing

- Robeisy Ramírez of Cuba wins gold in the Men's flyweight final after defeating Nyambayaryn Tögstsogt.
- In the Men's lightweight final Vasyl Lomachenko of Ukraine wins his second gold medal in successive games after easily beating Han Soon-Chul of South Korea
- Kazakhstan's Serik Sapiyev wins gold in the Men's welterweight after defeating Fred Evens of Great Britain.
- Egor Mekhontsev of Russia wins the gold medal on a judges decision in the Men's light heavyweight final against Adilbek Niyazymbetov.
- Anthony Joshua of Great Britain wins the host nation's 29th and final gold medal of the games after beating the twice and reigning Olympic champion Roberto Cammarelle of Italy in the Men's super heavyweight final on a judges decision.

Closing ceremony

- Commencing at 21:00.

Cycling

- Men's cross-country final at 13:30.

Gymnastics

- Women's rhythmic group all-around Russian Federation wins for the fourth time in a row the gold medal of the team all around competition, a run that begun in Sydney 2000

Handball

- Men's finals at 15:00.

Modern pentathlon

- Women's final at 08:45.

Volleyball

- Men's tournament final at 13:00.

Water polo

- Men's final at 15:50.

Wrestling

- Men's freestyle 66 kg.
- Men's freestyle 96 kg.

Gold medalists
Sport	Event	Competitor(s)	NOC	Rec	Ref
Athletics	Men's marathon	Stephen Kiprotich	Uganda		
Basketball	Men's	Tyson Chandler, Kevin Durant, LeBron James, Russell Westbrook, Deron Williams, Andre Iguodala, Kobe Bryant, Kevin Love, James Harden, Chris Paul, Anthony Davis, Carmelo Anthony	United States		
Boxing	Men's flyweight	Robeisy Ramírez	Cuba		
Boxing	Men's lightweight	Vasyl Lomachenko	Ukraine		
Boxing	Men's welterweight	Serik Sapiyev	Kazakhstan		
Boxing	Men's light heavyweight	Egor Mekhontsev	Russia		
Boxing	Men's super heavyweight	Anthony Joshua	Great Britain		
Cycling	Men's cross-country	Jaroslav Kulhavý	Czech Republic		
Gymnastics	Women's rhythmic group all-around	Anastasia Bliznyuk, Uliana Donskova; Ksenia Dudkina, Alina Makarenko, Anastasia Nazarenko, Karolina Sevastyanova	Russia		
Handball	Men's	Jérôme Fernandez, Didier Dinart, Xavier Barachet, Guillaume Gille, Bertrand Gille, Daniel Narcisse, Guillaume Joli, Samuel Honrubia, Daouda Karaboué, Nikola Karabatić, Thierry Omeyer, William Accambray, Luc Abalo, Cédric Sorhaindo, Michaël Guigou	France		
Modern pentathlon	Women's	Laura Asadauskaitė	Lithuania	OR	
Volleyball	Men's	Nikolay Apalikov, Taras Khtey, Sergey Grankin, Sergey Tetyukhin, Aleksandr Sokolov, Yury Berezhko, Aleksandr Butko, Dmitriy Muserskiy, Dmitriy Ilinikh, Maxim Mikhaylov, Aleksandr Volkov, Aleksey Obmochaev	Russia		
Water polo	Men's	Josip Pavić, Damir Burić, Miho Bošković, Nikša Dobud, Maro Joković, Petar Muslim, Ivan Buljubašić, Andro Bušlje, Sandro Sukno, Samir Barač, Igor Hinić, Paulo Obradović, Frano Vićan	Croatia		
Wrestling	Men's freestyle 66 kg	Tatsuhiro Yonemitsu	Japan		
Wrestling	Men's freestyle 96 kg	Jacob Varner	United States		
