= 2010 FINA Diving World Cup – Men's 10 m platform =

The competition of the men's 10 metre platform was held on June 6, the fifth and last day of the 2010 FINA Diving World Cup.

== Results ==
Green denotes finalists

Rank	Diver	Nationality	Preliminary		Semifinal		Final	
Rank	Diver	Nationality	Points	Rank	Points	Rank	Points	Rank
1st place, gold medalist(s)	Matthew Mitcham	Australia	499.90	3	508.85	4	562.80	1
2nd place, silver medalist(s)	Huo Liang	China	550.50	2	546.90	2	555.40	2
3rd place, bronze medalist(s)	Qiu Bo	China	576.75	1	548.05	1	554.70	3
4	Victor Minibaev	Russia	482.75	6	478.00	8	525.00	4
5	Jose Guerra	Cuba	475.10	7	521.85	3	511.00	5
6	Peter Waterfield	Great Britain	452.80	12	496.65	5	500.45	6
7	Rommel Pacheco	Mexico	417.60	18	481.80	7	496.05	7
8	Nick McCrory	United States	467.55	8	473.75	9	482.20	8
9	Vadim Kaptur	Belarus	437.20	15	454.55	11	450.85	9
10	Alexey Kravchenko	Russia	484.15	5	462.05	10	441.60	10
11	Timofei Hordeichik	Belarus	419.65	17	454.35	12	436.65	11
12	Anton Zakharov	Ukraine	496.80	4	494.25	6	422.55	12
13	David Boudia	United States	457.55	11	452.10	13		
14	Jeinkler Aguirre	Cuba	460.60	9	437.45	14		
15	Sebastian Villa Castaneda	Colombia	426.60	16	422.65	15		
16	German Sanchez	Mexico	459.20	10	417.15	16		
17	Christofer Eskilsson	Sweden	438.15	14	416.05	17		
18	Max Brick	Great Britain	444.90	13	380.60	18		
19	Riley McCormick	Canada	412.90	19				
20	Michael Tizfas	Greece	412.75	20				
21	Hugo Parisi	Brazil	395.70	21				
22	Bryan Nickson Lomas	Malaysia	391.60	22				
23	Ooi Tze Liang	Malaysia	382.10	23				
24	Shahnam Nazarpour	Iran	309.40	24				
25	Kim Jin-yong	South Korea	291.70	25				
--	Victor Ortega	Colombia	WDR					
--	Patrick Hausding	Germany	WDR					
--	Sascha Klein	Germany	WDR					

LEGEND

WDR = Withdrew
