= 2010 FINA Diving World Cup – Men's 3 m synchro springboard =

The competition of the men's 3 metre springboard synchronized was held on June 2, the first day of the 2010 FINA Diving World Cup.

== Results ==
Green denotes finalists

Rank	Diver	Nationality	Preliminary		Final	
Rank	Diver	Nationality	Points	Rank	Points	Rank
1st place, gold medalist(s)	Yutong Luo; Kai Qin	China	445.26	1	460.62	1
2nd place, silver medalist(s)	Troy Dumais; Kristian Ipsen	United States	423.75	3	440.01	2
3rd place, bronze medalist(s)	Illya Kvasha; Oleksiy Prygorov	Ukraine	427.95	2	432.30	3
4	Reuben Ross; Alexandre Despatie	Canada	419.61	4	424.92	4
5	Patrick Hausding; Stephan Feck	Germany	381.39	10	421.08	5
6	Dmitry Sautin; Yuriy Kunakov	Russia	413.79	5	419.61	6
7	Jorge Betancourt; José Guerra	Cuba	405.33	6	416.46	7
8	Damien Cely; Matthieu Rosset	France	382.20	9	411.48	8
9	Yeoh Ken Nee; Bryan Nickson Lomas	Malaysia	386.43	7	402.72	9
10	Yahel Castillo; Osiris Argote	Mexico	386.10	8	396.06	10
11	Matthew Mitcham; Ethan Warren	Australia	381.30	11	389.79	11
12	Juan Uran Salazar; Victor Ortega	Colombia	368.60	12	272.97	12
13	Alex Manos; Stefanos Paparounas	Greece	367.86	13		
14	Seongchel Son; Jiho Park	South Korea	360.75	14		
15	Ghaem Mirabian; Shbaz Shahnazi	Iran	307.32	15		

LEGEND

WDR = Withdrew
