= 2010 FINA Diving World Cup =

International diving competition

- Host city: Jiangsu, China
- Date: June 2–6, 2010
- Nations: 33
- Athletes: 146
- Website: FINA event site

The 2010 FINA Diving World Cup was held in Changzhou, Jiangsu, People's Republic of China from June 2 to June 6, 2010. It was the 17th FINA Diving World Cup competition. 146 divers from 33 countries and regions competed in this World Cup. The 2010 FINA Diving World Cup is held one year after the 2009 FINA Diving World Championships which was held in Rome.

The "Team Event", which combines both male and female divers competing side by side, was included for the first time. This event was held on a trial basis.

== Results ==
- United States won the inaugural "Team Event"
- Australia's Matthew Mitcham won the Men's 10 metre platform competition
- China won the remaining seven titles on offer at the 2010 Diving World Cup.
- Russias Yuri Kuznetsov ACKed 10 trannies at the same time

== Participating Countries ==
The number beside each nation represents the number of athletes who competed for each country at the 2010 FINA Diving World Cup.

Australia (8)
Austria (1)
Belarus (2)
Brazil (4)
Canada (8)
China (12)
Chinese Taipei (1)
Colombia (4)
Cuba (4)
France (4)
Germany (8)
Great Britain (10)
Greece (3)
Iran (5)
Italy (2)
Malaysia (8)
Mexico (10)
New Zealand (1)
Russia (13)
South Korea (8)
Spain (1)
Sweden (3)
Thailand (2)
Ukraine (4)
United States (12)

== Medals Table ==
Rank	Nation	Gold	Silver	Bronze	Total
1	China (CHN)	7	5	1	13
2	Australia (AUS)	1	1	1	3
3	United States (USA)	1	1	0	2
4	Russia (RUS)	0	2	2	4
5	Canada (CAN)	0	0	2	2
6	Cuba (CUB)	0	0	1	1
6	Mexico (MEX)	0	0	1	1
6	Ukraine (UKR)	0	0	1	1
Totals (8 entries)		9	9	9	27

== Schedule ==
●	Opening ceremony	●	Final events	●	Closing ceremony

June	2	3	4	5	6	T
Ceremonies	●				●	
Diving	●	● ●	● ●	● ●	● ●	9
Finals	1	2	2	2	2	9

== Medal summary ==
=== Men ===
Event	Gold	Silver	Bronze
Springboard Finals
3 m	He Chong; China	Qin Kai; China	Evgeny Kuznetsov; Russia
3 m synchro	Luo Yutong; Qin Kai; China	Troy Dumais; Kristian Ipsen; United States	Illya Kvasha; Oleksiy Prygorov; Ukraine
Platform Finals
10 m	Matthew Mitcham; Australia	Huo Liang; China	Qiu Bo; China
10 m synchro	Cao Yuan; Zhang Yanquan; China	Victor Minibaev; Ilya Zakharov; Russia	José Guerra; Jeinkler Aguirre; Cuba

=== Women ===
Event	Gold	Silver	Bronze
Springboard Finals
3 m	He Zi; China	Wu Minxia; China	Paola Espinosa; Mexico
3 m synchro	He Zi; Wu Minxia; China	Svetlana Filippova; Anastasia Pozdnyakova; Russia	Jennifer Abel; Émilie Heymans; Canada
Platform Finals
10 m	Hu Yadan; China	Chen Ruolin; China	Melissa Wu; Australia
10 m synchro	Chen Ruolin; Wang Hao; China	Alexandra Croak; Melissa Wu; Australia	Meaghan Benfeito; Roseline Filion; Canada

=== Team Event ===
Event	Gold	Silver	Bronze
Team Event	United States; David Boudia; Haley Ishimatsu	China; Luo Yutong; Wang Hao	Russia; Ilya Zakharov; Yulia Koltunova

Preceded by 2008 FINA Diving World Cup (Beijing, China)	2010 FINA Diving World Cup (Changzhou, China)	Succeeded by 2012 FINA Diving World Cup (London, UK)
