= 2010 FINA Diving World Cup – Women's 3 m springboard =

The competition of the women's 3 metre springboard was held on June 5, the fourth day of the 2010 FINA Diving World Cup.

== Results ==
Green denotes finalists

Rank	Diver	Nationality	Preliminary		Semifinal		Final	
Rank	Diver	Nationality	Points	Rank	Points	Rank	Points	Rank
1st place, gold medalist(s)	He Zi	China	385.05	1	374.40	1	395.55	1
2nd place, silver medalist(s)	Wu Minxia	China	372.20	2	361.45	2	371.05	2
3rd place, bronze medalist(s)	Paola Espinosa	Mexico	323.60	5	343.80	3	367.80	3
4	Jennifer Abel	Canada	322.05	6	317.30	5	353.55	4
5	Sharleen Stratton	Australia	321.85	7	327.90	4	339.90	5
6	Tania Cagnotto	Italy	324.45	4	294.00	10	323.15	6
7	Anabelle Smith	Australia	316.70	8	308.00	7	322.40	7
8	Abby Johnston	United States	270.05	13	293.75	11	321.75	8
9	Kelci Bryant	United States	326.10	3	309.65	6	321.15	9
10	Uschi Freitag	Germany	297.95	10	305.25	8	318.20	10
11	Anastasia Pozdniakova	Russia	264.60	15	295.20	9	306.30	11
12	Katja Dieckow	Germany	279.90	13	292.90	12	285.30	12
13	Rebecca Gallantree	Great Britain	301.30	9	287.25	13		
14	Juliana Veloso	Brazil	265.35	14	283.70	14		
15	Francesca Dallape	Italy	282.30	11	260.10	15		
16	Claire Febvay	France	248.25	18	254.40	16		
17	Ng Yan Yee	Malaysia	251.00	16	236.20	17		
18	Daria Govor	Russia	249.60	17	226.60	18		
19	Hannah Starling	Great Britain	242.55	19				
20	Kratochwil Veronika	Austria	228.70	20				
21	Diana Pineda	Colombia	221.75	21				
22	Yaerim Lee	South Korea	215.90	22				
23	En-Tien Huang	Chinese Taipei	214.95	23				
24	Nami Kim	South Korea	200.00	24				
25	Arantxa Chavez	Mexico	195.00	25				
26	Emilie Heymans	Canada	WDR					

LEGEND

WDR = Withdrew
