= 2010 FINA Diving World Cup – Men's 3 m springboard =

The competition of the men's 3 metre springboard was held on June 4, the third day of the 2010 FINA Diving World Cup.

== Results ==
Green denotes finalists

Rank	Diver	Nationality	Preliminary		Semifinal		Final	
Rank	Diver	Nationality	Points	Rank	Points	Rank	Points	Rank
1st place, gold medalist(s)	Chong He	China	516.75	1	523.20	1	546.55	1
2nd place, silver medalist(s)	Kai Qin	China	477.65	2	518.50	2	522.35	2
3rd place, bronze medalist(s)	Evgeny Kuznetsov	Russia	473.75	3	500.25	3	501.85	3
4	Yahel Castillo	Mexico	452.10	6	458.65	5	490.00	4
5	Patrick Hausding	Germany	418.95	12	443.95	9	481.75	5
6	Kristian Ipsen	United States	403.60	18	449.65	6	480.30	6
7	Alexandre Despatie	Canada	472.30	4	479.35	4	476.85	7
8	Javier Illana	Spain	422.40	10	447.90	7	475.10	8
9	Chris Colwill	United States	445.80	7	439.90	11	466.20	9
10	Illya Kvasha	Ukraine	427.20	8	437.60	12	463.55	10
11	César Castro	Brazil	417.70	13	444.90	8	444.00	11
12	Ethan Warren	Australia	407.20	17	442.60	10	437.95	12
13	Eric Sehn	Canada	415.70	15	422.50	13		
14	Matthieu Rosset	France	422.00	11	415.50	14		
15	Damien Cely	France	415.85	14	407.80	15		
16	Oleksiy Prygorov	Ukraine	414.35	16	399.30	16		
17	Chris Mears	Great Britain	424.90	9	398.90	17		
18	Pavlo Rozenberg	Germany	453.00	5	388.50	18		
19	Seongchel Son	South Korea	399.45	19				
20	Jorge Betancourt	Cuba	393.20	20				
21	Scott Robertson	Australia	384.95	21				
22	Muhammad Fakhrul Izzat	Malaysia	378.20	22				
23	Evgeny Novoselov	Russia	377.10	23				
24	Yeoh Ken Nee	Malaysia	376.15	24				
25	Sebastian Villa Castaneda	Colombia	374.80	25				
26	Jonathan Jornfalk	Sweden	368.95	26				
27	Park Ji-Ho	South Korea	364.50	27				
28	Daniel Islas Arroyo	Mexico	352.65	28				
29	Stefanos Paparounas	Greece	351.15	29				
30	Abel Ramirez	Cuba	332.05	30				
31	Jack Laugher	Great Britain	322.60	31				
32	Chaem Mirabian	Iran	322.40	32				
33	Mahdi Agharezaei	Iran	282.80	33				
34	Alexandros Manos	Greece	272.40	34				
35	Sin Hoon Teerapatee	Thailand	242.05	35				
36	Jantradon Sittichok	Thailand	184.20	36				
