= Diving at the 2012 Summer Olympics =

Coordinates: 51.5402°N 0.0106°W

Diving at the Games of the XXX Olympiad
- Venue: Aquatics Centre
- Dates: 29 July – 11 August 2012
- Competitors: 136 from 25 nations

The diving competitions at the 2012 Olympic Games in London took place from 29 July to 11 August at the Aquatics Centre within the Olympic Park. It was one of five aquatic disciplines at the Games, along with marathon swimming, swimming, synchronised swimming and water polo.

The 2012 Games featured competitions in eight events (men and women events each of): 3m springboard, synchronised 3m springboard, 10m platform, and synchronised 10m platform.

The diving featured 136 athletes representing 25 countries. All divers must be at least 14 years old on or by 31 December 2012.

China was the most successful nation, topping the medal table with six golds and ten in total.

== Qualification ==
A nation could have no more than 16 divers qualify (up to eight males and eight females) and could enter up to two divers in individual events and one pair in synchronised events.

For the individual diving events, qualifiers were:

- the top 12 finishers in each event from the 2011 World Championships,
- the five continental champions in each event, and
- up to 18 semi-finalists from the 2012 Diving World Cup.

For the synchronised events (pairs), qualifiers were:

- the top three finishers in each event from the 2011 World Championships,
- the top four from in each event the 2012 World Cup, and
- the host nation (Great Britain).

Note: Qualifying spots go to the nation – they are not tied to the individual diver who achieved the place/finish at the qualifying event. However, an individual diver may only qualify one spot for their nation.

== Participating nations ==
Twenty-five nations competed in diving at the 2012 Olympics:

- Australia (10)
- Belarus (2)
- Brazil (3)
- Canada (9)
- China (12)
- Colombia (2)
- Cuba (3)
- France (5)
- Germany (8)
- Great Britain (12)
- Greece (1)
- Hungary (2)
- Italy (8)
- Japan (1)
- Malaysia (9)
- Mexico (10)
- Norway (1)
- North Korea (3)
- Russia (7)
- South Korea (2)
- Spain (2)
- Sweden (2)
- Ukraine (9)
- United States (11)
- Venezuela (3)

== Schedule ==
P	Preliminaries	½	Semifinal	F	Final

Date →	Sun 29	Mon 30	Tue 31	Wed 1	Fri 3	Sat 4	Sun 5	Mon 6	Tue 7		Wed 8	Thu 9		Fri 10	Sat 11	
Event ↓	A	A	A	A	A	A	E	E	M	E	E	M	E	E	M	E
Men's 3 m springboard								P	½	F						
Men's 10 m platform														P	½	F
Men's synchronized 3 m springboard				F												
Men's synchronized 10 m platform		F														
Women's 3 m springboard					P	½	F									
Women's 10 m platform											P	½	F			
Women's synchronized 3 m springboard	F															
Women's synchronized 10 m platform			F													

M = Morning session, A = Afternoon session, E = Evening session

== Medalists ==
=== Medal table ===
Rank	Nation	Gold	Silver	Bronze	Total
1	China	6	3	1	10
2	United States	1	1	2	4
3	Russia	1	1	0	2
4	Mexico	0	2	1	3
5	Australia	0	1	0	1
6	Canada	0	0	2	2
7	Great Britain	0	0	1	1
7	Malaysia	0	0	1	1
Totals (8 entries)		8	8	8	24

=== Men ===
Event	Gold	Silver	Bronze
3 m springboard	Ilya Zakharov; Russia	Qin Kai; China	He Chong; China
10 m platform	David Boudia; United States	Qiu Bo; China	Tom Daley; Great Britain
Synchronised 3 m springboard	Luo Yutong and Qin Kai (CHN)	Ilya Zakharov and Evgeny Kuznetsov (RUS)	Troy Dumais and Kristian Ipsen (USA)
Synchronised 10 m platform	Cao Yuan and Zhang Yanquan (CHN)	Iván García and Germán Sánchez (MEX)	David Boudia and Nicholas McCrory (USA)

=== Women ===
Event	Gold	Silver	Bronze
3 m springboard	Wu Minxia; China	He Zi; China	Laura Sánchez; Mexico
10 m platform	Chen Ruolin; China	Brittany Broben; Australia	Pandelela Rinong; Malaysia
Synchronised 3 m springboard	He Zi and Wu Minxia (CHN)	Kelci Bryant and Abigail Johnston (USA)	Jennifer Abel and Émilie Heymans (CAN)
Synchronised 10 m platform	Chen Ruolin and Wang Hao (CHN)	Paola Espinosa and Alejandra Orozco (MEX)	Meaghan Benfeito and Roseline Filion (CAN)
