= 2010 FINA Diving World Cup – Team Event =

The 2010 FINA Diving World Cup presented a new event in the sport of diving which is team event. This event replaced the traditional men and women's 1 metre springboard. The team event was contested on June 2, the first day of the 2010 FINA Diving World Cup.

== Results ==
Green denotes finalists

Rank	Diver	Nationality	Points
1st place, gold medalist(s)	David Boudia; Haley Ishimatsu	United States	455.36
2nd place, silver medalist(s)	Yutong Luo; Hao Wang	China	442.60
3rd place, bronze medalist(s)	Ilya Zakharov; Yulia Koltunova	Russia	422.90
4	Rommel Pacheco; Paola Espinosa	Mexico	422.00
5	Sascha Klein; Christin Steuer	Germany	401.65
6	Anabelle Smith; Ethan Warren	Australia	397.40
7	Mattieu Rosset; Audrey Labeau	France	393.35
8	Diana Pineda; Sebastian Villa Castaneda	Colombia	375.35
