= Melissa Wu =

Australian diver (born 1992)

Melissa Wu OLY
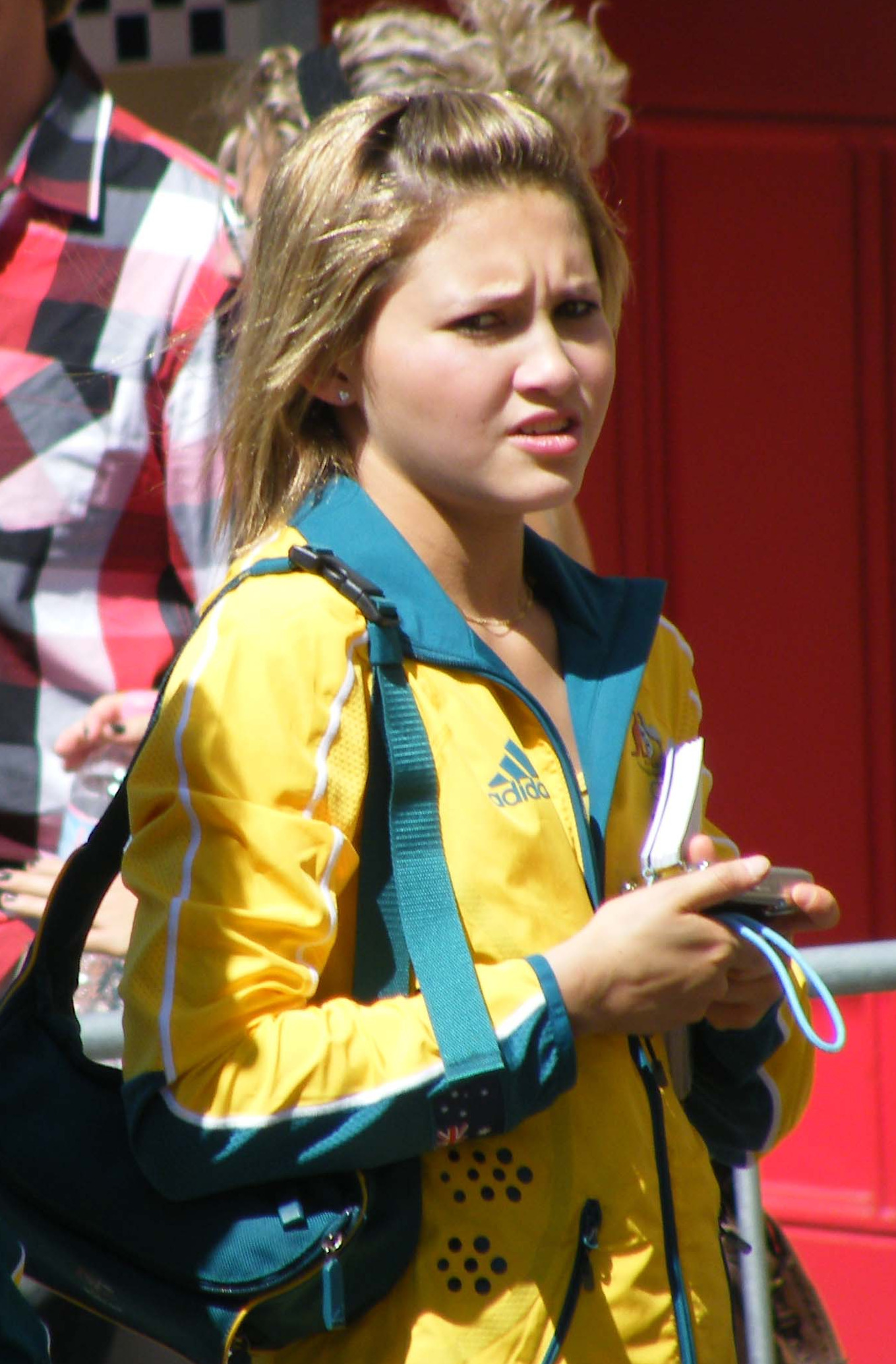
- Wu at the 2008 Olympics

Personal information
- Full name: Melissa Paige Li Kun Wu
- Nickname: Woodles
- Born: 3 May 1992 (age 34) Penrith, New South Wales, Australia
- Height: 1.52 m (5 ft 0 in)

Sport
- Country: Australia
- Sport: Diving
- Event(s): 10 m individual platform, 10 m synchro platform, 10 m mixed synchro platform
- Club: Perfect 10 Diving Club
- Team: NSWIS
- Coached by: Chava Sobrino
Medal record
Representing Australia
Olympic Games
Silver medal – second place	2008 Beijing	10 m synchro platform
Bronze medal – third place	2020 Tokyo	10 m individual platform
World Championships
Silver medal – second place	2007 Melbourne	10 m synchro platform
Silver medal – second place	2011 Shanghai	10 m synchro platform
Bronze medal – third place	2015 Kazan	10 m mixed synchro platform
Commonwealth Games
Gold medal – first place	2010 Delhi	10 m synchro platform
Gold medal – first place	2018 Gold Coast	10 m individual platform
Gold medal – first place	2022 Birmingham	10 m synchro platform
Silver medal – second place	2006 Melbourne	10 m synchro platform
Silver medal – second place	2010 Delhi	10 m individual platform
World Cup
Silver medal – second place	2010 Changzhou	10 m synchro platform
Bronze medal – third place	2008 Beijing	10 m synchro platform
Bronze medal – third place	2010 Changzhou	10 m individual platform
Bronze medal – third place	2014 Shanghai	10 m individual platform
Bronze medal – third place	2016 Rio	10 m individual platform

Melissa Paige Li Kun Wu (born 3 May 1992) is an Australian diver who has represented Australia at five Olympic Games, winning a silver medal at the 2008 Olympic Games and a bronze medal at the 2020 Olympic Games. She has also represented Australia at five Commonwealth Games, winning gold medals in 2010, 2018 and 2022 and silver medals in 2006 and 2010. Wu is a NSW Institute of Sport (NSWIS) scholarship holder.

== Early life and education ==
Melissa Paige Li Kun Wu was born on 3 May 1992 in Penrith, New South Wales. Her father is of Chinese descent.

Wu is a NSW Institute of Sport (NSWIS) scholarship holder, where she has trained under Chava Sobrino.

== Career ==
Wu began diving in 2003. The same year she fractured her humerus bone in her left arm after accidentally landing on a trampoline, and had to halt training for six months. After winning a number of junior and state titles in 2004 and 2005, she won the individual 10-metre platform at the Australian Open Diving Championships in 2006. The win earned her a place on the team for the 2006 Commonwealth Games in Melbourne, where she won a silver medal in the synchronised 10-metre platform with Alexandra Croak and finished fifth in the individual 10-metre platform.

In 2008, along with Briony Cole, Wu won a silver medal at the 2008 Olympic Games in Beijing for the synchronised 10-metre platform, becoming the youngest Australian ever to win an Olympic medal in diving. She also competed in the women's 10-metre platform, making it into the finals, ending up ranked sixth out of twelve competitors.

At the 2010 Commonwealth Games in Delhi, Wu won a gold medal in the synchronised 10-metre platform with her partner Alexandra Croak and a silver medal in the individual 10-metre platform.

Wu placed fourth in the 10-metre individual platform at the 2012 Olympic Games in London and fifth in the same event at the 2016 Olympic Games in Rio de Janeiro.

Wu competed at the 2018 Commonwealth Games on the Gold Coast, winning gold in the individual 10-metre platform and, with Teju Williamson, placing fourth in the synchronised 10-metre platform.

Qualifying for her fourth Olympics, Wu competed in the individual 10-metre platform at the 2020 Olympic Games in Tokyo. She achieved a bronze medal.

At the 2022 Commonwealth Games in Birmingham, Wu teamed up with Charli Petrov in the synchronised 10-metre platform. Wu and Petrov achieved a gold medal.

In June 2024, she competed at Adelaide in the Australian Open Championships. She won the Women’s 10-Metre Platform becoming the Australian Champion. The runner up was Ellie Cole who was 17 years old. Wu prepared herself for her fifth Olympics, this time in Paris. No other Australian diver has been to five games. There were eight other divers in the team including Ellie Cole. Both Wu and Cole represented Australia in the ten metre platform.

Her club is the Perfect 10 Diving Club.

== Recognition ==
In February 2025, Wu was invited to give the Wang Gungwu Lecture at the National Foundation for Australia-China Relations.

== Personal life ==
As of 2017 Wu lives in Sydney. Her nickname is "Woodles".

She is the cousin of Australian rugby union player James Stannard and the second cousin of Australian runner Jana Pittman. Her brother, Joshua, and sister, Madeline, both train in weightlifting.

Wu is 1.52 metres (5 ft 0 in) tall. She has a tattoo of the Olympic rings shaped as hearts on her right leg. She also has a tattoo across her left rib featuring the words "only as much as I dream can I be".
