= 2008 FINA Diving World Cup =

Diving competition in Beijing, China

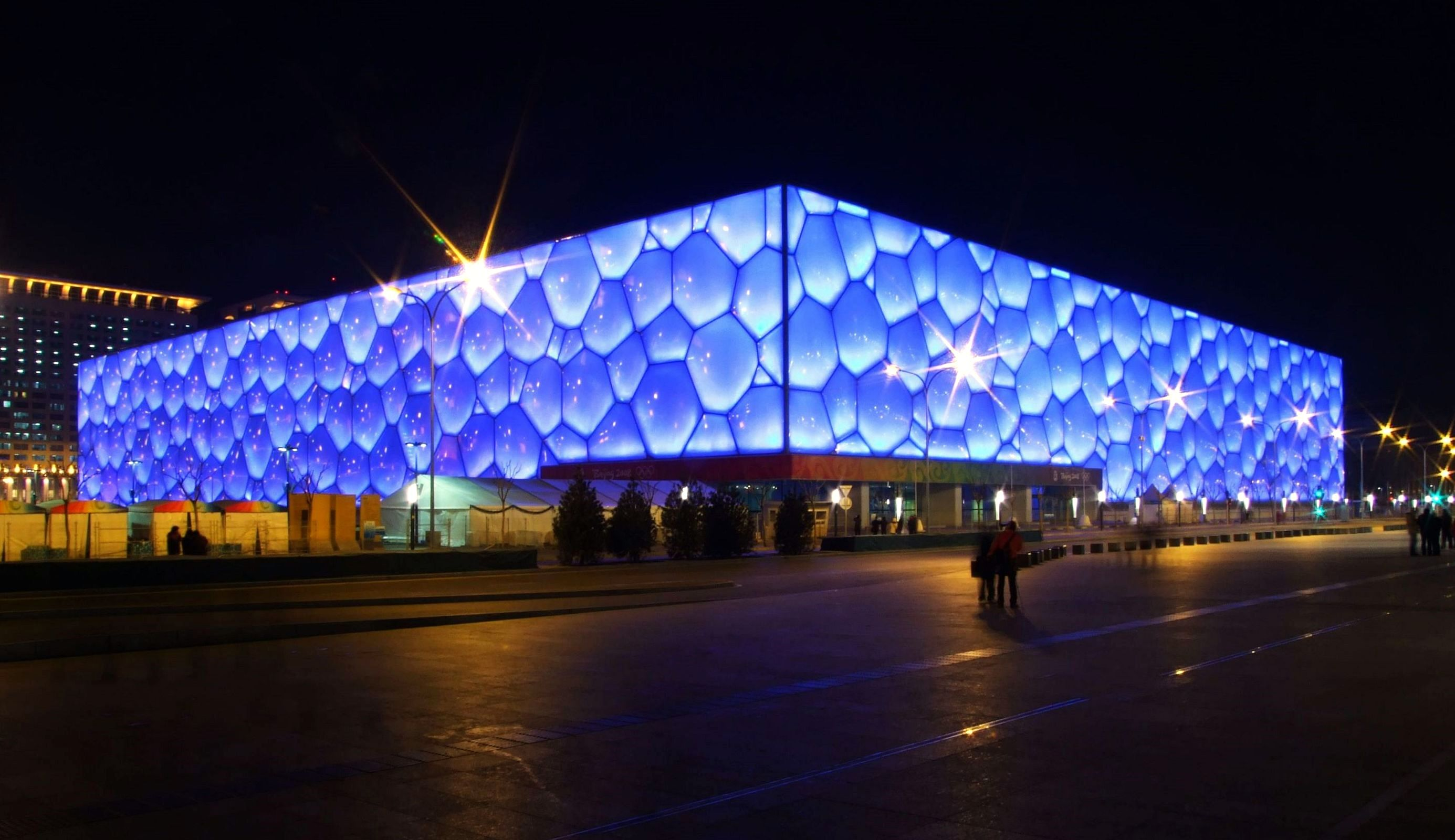
The Beijing Aquatics Center (Water Cube).

The 2008 FINA Diving World Cup was held in Beijing, China and was a test event for the new Beijing Aquatics Center (Water Cube), as well as a qualifying event for 2008 Summer Olympics in Beijing.

== Summary of Events ==
- China won all but one Discipline at the 2008 World Cup.
- Germany's Sascha Klien won the Ten Meter Platform (the only title China didn't get).

== Medal table ==
Rank	Nation	Gold	Silver	Bronze	Total
1	China (CHN)	7	4	0	11
2	Germany (GER)	1	1	0	2
3	Russia (RUS)	0	2	0	2
4	Canada (CAN)	0	1	1	2
5	Australia (AUS)	0	0	2	2
5	Mexico (MEX)	0	0	2	2
5	United States (USA)	0	0	2	2
8	Great Britain (GBR)	0	0	1	1
Totals (8 entries)		8	8	8	24

== Medals ==
=== Man ===
Event	Gold	Silver	Bronze
Springboard Finals
3 m	He Chong; China	Qin Kai; China	Yahel Castillo; Mexico
3 m synchro	Qin Kai; Wang Feng; China	Yuriy Kunakov; Dmitri Sautin; Russia	Alexander Despatie; Arturo Miranda; Canada
Platform Finals
10 m	Sascha Klein; Germany	Zhou Lüxin; China	David Boudia; United States
10 m synchro	Huo Liang; Lin Yue; China	Patrick Hausding; Sascha Klein; Germany	Blake Aldridge; Thomas Daley; Great Britain

=== Women ===
Event	Gold	Silver	Bronze
Springboard Finals
3 m	Wu Minxia; China	Guo Jingjing; China	Sharleen Stratton; Australia
3 m synchro	Guo Jingjing; Wu Minxia; China	Yuliya Pakhalina; Anastasia Pozdnyakova; Russia	Kelci Bryant; Ariel Rittenhouse; United States
Platform Finals
10 m	Chen Ruolin; China	Wang Xin; China	Paola Espinosa; Mexico
10 m synchro	Chen Ruolin; Wang Xin; China	Émilie Heymans; Marie-Ève Marleau; Canada	Briony Cole; Melissa Wu; Australia

Preceded by 2006 FINA Diving World Cup (Changzhou, China)	2008 FINA Diving World Cup (Beijing, China)	Succeeded by 2010 FINA Diving World Cup (Changzhou, China)
