= 2010 FINA Diving World Cup – Women's 3 m synchro springboard =

The finals competition of the women's 3 metre springboard synchronized was held on June 6, the fifth and last day of the 2010 FINA Diving World Cup.

== Results ==
| Rank | Diver | Nationality | Preliminary | | Final | |
| Rank | Diver | Nationality | Points | Rank | Points | Rank |
|---|---|---|---|---|---|---|
| 1st place, gold medalist(s) | Zi He; Minxia Wu | China | 339.60 | 1 | 354.90 | 1 |
| 2nd place, silver medalist(s) | Svetlana Philippova; Anastasia Pozdniakova | Russia | 298.74 | 5 | 323.52 | 2 |
| 3rd place, bronze medalist(s) | Jennifer Abel; Emilie Heymans | Canada | 306.00 | 3 | 322.50 | 3 |
| 4 | Briony Cole; Sharleen Stratton | Australia | 309.81 | 2 | 320.61 | 4 |
| 5 | Cook Kassidy; Krug Cassidy | United States | 300.30 | 4 | 318.30 | 5 |
| 6 | Francesca Dallapè; Tania Cagnotto | Italy | 297.30 | 6 | 317.40 | 6 |
| 7 | Arantxa Chavez; Laura Sanchez | Mexico | 289.68 | 7 | 303.39 | 7 |
| 8 | Rebecca Gallantree; Alicia Blagg | Great Britain | 275.70 | 9 | 297.24 | 8 |
| 9 | Katja Dieckow; Uschi Freitag | Germany | 279.30 | 8 | 295.50 | 9 |
| 10 | Leong Mun Yee; Ng Yan Yee | Malaysia | 261.90 | 10 | 279.48 | 10 |
| 11 | Yaerim Lee; Kim Nami | South Korea | 241.89 | 11 | 250.35 | 11 |

LEGEND

WDR = Withdrew
