= 2010 FINA Diving World Cup – Women's 10 m platform =

The competition of the women's 10 metre platform was held on June 3, the second day of the 2010 FINA Diving World Cup.

== Results ==
Green denotes finalists

Rank	Diver	Nationality	Preliminary		Semifinal		Final	
Rank	Diver	Nationality	Points	Rank	Points	Rank	Points	Rank
1st place, gold medalist(s)	Yadan Hu	China	403.15	1	432.00	1	452.80	1
2nd place, silver medalist(s)	Ruolin Chen	China	399.00	2	416.25	2	437.20	2
3rd place, bronze medalist(s)	Melissa Wu	Australia	373.60	3	379.95	3	374.30	3
4	Meaghan Benefeito	Canada	288.80	15	316.00	11	359.65	4
5	Yulia Koltunova	Russia	312.20	10	348.70	4	354.55	5
6	Roseline Filion	Canada	323.50	9	313.90	12	353.70	6
7	Pandelela Rinong Pamg	Malaysia	311.30	11	333.30	6	351.40	7
8	Paola Espinosa	Mexico	362.75	4	345.15	5	338.15	8
9	Alexandra Croak	Australia	350.50	5	325.10	7	328.05	9
10	Audrey Labeau	France	324.05	8	324.05	8	317.45	10
11	Tonia Couch	United Kingdom	325.70	7	322.55	9	302.80	11
12	Christin Steuer	Germany	362.75	4	345.15	5	301.60	12
13	Haley Ishimatsu	United States	283.45	16	311.70	13		
14	Sarah Barrow	Great Britain	290.10	14	310.35	14		
15	Nora Subschinski	Germany	342.85	6	306.80	15		
16	Traisy Vivien Tukiet	Malaysia	280.30	17	293.85	16		
17	Elina Eggers	Sweden	292.50	13	285.85	17		
18	Amy Korthauer	United States	276.20	18	229.75	18		
19	Gabe Armstrong	New Zealand	273.30	19				
20	Olga Vintonyak	Russia	268.70	20				
21	Eunbi Cho	South Korea	258.65	21				
22	Seung Yun	South Korea	249.85	22				
23	Karla Rivas	Mexico	219.15	23				
--	Diana Pineda	Colombia	WDR					

LEGEND

WDR = Withdrew
