= 2010 FINA Diving World Cup – Women's 10 m synchro platform =

2010 finals competition

The finals competition of the women's 10 metre platform synchronized was held on June 4, the third day of the 2010 FINA Diving World Cup.

== Results ==
Green denotes finalists

Rank	Diver	Nationality	Preliminary		Final	
Rank	Diver	Nationality	Points	Rank	Points	Rank
1st place, gold medalist(s)	Ruolin Chen; Hao Wang	China	341.94	1	349.56	1
2nd place, silver medalist(s)	Melissa Wu; Alexandra Croak	Australia	301.74	3	331.56	2
3rd place, bronze medalist(s)	Meaghan Benefeito; Roseline Filion	Canada	282.57	7	322.89	3
4	Rebecca Gallantree; Stacie Powell	Great Britain	283.62	5	322.02	4
5	Pandelela Rinong Pamg; Leong Mun Yee	Malaysia	297.72	4	321.96	5
6	Yulia Koltunova; Natalia Goncharova	Russia	304.80	2	314.34	6
7	Nora Subschinski; Christin Steuer	Germany	277.80	8	311.82	7
8	Haley Ishimatsu; Mary Dunnichay	United States	277.74	9	308.40	8
9	Audrey Labeau; Claire Febvay	France	282.90	6	299.22	9
10	Eunbi Cho; Seung Yun	South Korea	267.39	11	267.45	10
11	Paola Espinosa; Karia Rivas	Mexico	276.72	10	253.68	11
