= Kelci Bryant =

American diver (born 1989)

Personal information
- Nationality: United States
- Born: January 15, 1989 (age 37) Springfield, Illinois
- Height: 1.63 m (5 ft 4 in)
- Weight: 61 kg (134 lb)

Sport
- Sport: Diving
- Event(s): 3 m, 3 m synchro
Medal record
Event	1st	2nd	3rd
Olympic Games	–	1	–
Summer Universiade	-	2	-
FINA Diving World Cup	–	–	1
Pan American Games	–	1	1
Olympic Games
Silver medal – second place	2012 London	3 m springboard synchro
Universiade
Silver medal – second place	2011 Shenzhen	Team
Silver medal – second place	2011 Shenzhen	1 m springboard
FINA Diving World Cup
Bronze medal – third place	2008 Beijing	3 m synchro
Pan American Games
Silver medal – second place	2007 Rio	Springboard synchro
Bronze medal – third place	2007 Rio	3 m springboard

Kelci Bryant (born January 15, 1989) is an American diver. She competes in the 3 m synchronized springboard event. Bryant competed in the 2008 Summer Olympics in Beijing, China, placing fourth with Ariel Rittenhouse, and won a silver medal in the 2012 Summer Olympics in London, England with partner Abigail Johnston. She is a two-time NCAA champion and dove at the University of Minnesota. She was born in Springfield, Illinois.
