= Diving at the 2012 Summer Olympics – Men's synchronized 3 metre springboard =

Men's synchronised 3 metre springboard at the Games of the XXX Olympiad
- Venue: Aquatics Centre
- Date: 1 August
- Competitors: 16 from 8 nations

Medalists
1st place, gold medalist(s)		Luo Yutong; Qin Kai	China
2nd place, silver medalist(s)		Ilya Zakharov; Evgeny Kuznetsov	Russia
3rd place, bronze medalist(s)		Troy Dumais; Kristian Ipsen	United States

The men's synchronised 3 metre springboard diving competition at the 2012 Olympic Games in London took place on 1 August at the Aquatics Centre within the Olympic Park.

The Chinese team of Luo Yutong and Qin Kai won the gold medal.

== Format ==
A single round was held, with each team making six dives. Eleven judges scored each dive: three for each diver, and five for synchronisation. Only the middle score counted for each diver, with the middle three counting for synchronisation. These five scores were averaged, multiplied by 3, and multiplied by the dive's degree of difficulty to give a total dive score. The scores for each of the six dives were summed to give a final score.

== Schedule ==
Times are British Summer Time (UTC+1)

Date	Time	Round
Wednesday, 1 August 2012	15:00	Final

== Results ==
Rank	Nation	Dives						Total
Rank	Nation	1	2	3	4	5	6	Total
1st place, gold medalist(s)	China; Luo Yutong; Qin Kai	56.40	52.20	85.68	88.74	104.88	89.10	477.00
2nd place, silver medalist(s)	Russia; Ilya Zakharov; Evgeny Kuznetsov	54.00	51.60	84.66	79.80	89.25	100.32	459.63
3rd place, bronze medalist(s)	United States; Troy Dumais; Kristian Ipsen	51.60	53.40	80.91	90.09	84.00	86.70	446.70
4	Ukraine; Oleksiy Pryhorov; Illya Kvasha	51.00	51.00	83.64	87.78	81.60	79.20	434.22
5	Great Britain; Chris Mears; Nicholas Robinson-Baker	52.20	52.20	77.22	78.54	84.66	87.78	432.60
6	Canada; Alexandre Despatie; Reuben Ross	54.00	50.40	72.00	82.62	80.19	82.62	421.83
7	Mexico; Yahel Castillo; Julián Sánchez	54.60	50.40	86.70	79.18	65.10	78.54	415.14
8	Malaysia; Huang Qiang; Bryan Lomas	52.80	52.20	78.12	80.19	63.24	78.54	405.09
