= Kristian Ipsen =

American diver

Personal information
- Born: October 20, 1992 (age 33) Walnut Creek, California
- Height: 170 cm (5 ft 7 in)

Sport
- Country: United States
- Events: 3 meter springboard, 3 meter springboard synchro
- College team: Stanford University
- Club: Diablo Divers
Medal record
Men's diving
Representing the United States
Olympic Games
Bronze medal – third place	2012 London	3 m synchro
World Championships
Silver medal – second place	2009 Rome	3 m synchro
Pan American Games
Silver medal – second place	2011 Guadalajara	3 m synchro

Kristian Ipsen (born October 20, 1992) is an American diver, who has been diving competitively since 1998. Diving alongside Troy Dumais, they took the silver medal in the synchronized 3 meter springboard at the 2009 World Aquatics Championships and the bronze medal at the 2012 Summer Olympics.

== Competitive diving career ==
At the 2011 US National Championships in August, Ipsen captured the senior men 3-meter springboard championship and teamed with Troy Dumais to win the synchronized men 3-meter springboard at UCLA's Spieker Aquatics Center.

In June 2012 Ipsen and his 3m synchro partner Troy Dumais qualified at the U.S. Olympic Team Trials held in Federal Way, Washington to represent the United States at the 2012 Olympic Games in London which began the following month.

Ipsen and Dumais won the bronze in the synchronized 3m on August 1, 2012 with a score of 446.7. The duo's medal along with David Boudia's gold in the 10 metre platform and Boudia and his partner Nicholas McCrory's bronze in the synchronized 10m platform were the first Olympic medals of any kind for the United States since 2000 and the first for a U.S male diver since 1996 in Atlanta when Mark Lenzi won the bronze medal in the 3 meter springboard.

At the 2016 FINA World Championships in Rio de Janeiro, Brazil, Ipsen won a bronze medal in the 3m springboard. It is his first individual diving medal at the FINA Diving World Cup.

At the 2016 Olympics trials, the team of Ipsen and Dumais came in second in the 3m springboard synchronized event. As there was only one spot on the Olympic squad in the event they did not qualify. The duo was bested by the team of Michael Hixon and Sam Dorman who went on to win the silver medal at the 2016 Summer Olympics in the event.

Ipsen represented the United States in the men's 3m springboard event at the 2016 Summer Olympics in Rio de Janeiro and finished fifth. Following the 3m springboard Olympic competition Ipsen related "I’m taking a significant break," ..."We’ll see if that Olympic spark comes back, but I’m definitely going to take a break after this".

== Personal life ==
Ipsen is the son of Kent and Yvette Ipsen. He has a younger sister, Lauren. He is currently employed by Salesforce inc. in San Francisco. He attended De La Salle High School. He graduated from Stanford University in 2015. He was a member of the Stanford Cardinal diving team during his time there. He is also currently married to fellow Stanford Diving alumni, Lilly Hinrichs.
