= Nick McCrory =

American psychiatrist and former diver

Personal information
- Born: August 9, 1991 (age 35) Chapel Hill, North Carolina
- Education: Duke University (Bachelor of Arts) (Doctor of Medicine)
- Height: 177 cm (5 ft 10 in)

Sport
- Country: United States
- Event: Diving
- College team: Duke University
Medal record
Men's diving
Representing the United States
Summer Olympics
Bronze medal – third place	2012 London	Synchro 10 metre platform

Nicholas Montgomery McCrory (born August 9, 1991) is an American psychiatrist, former diver and was a member of the national team from 2007 to 2014.

He won his first international medal, a silver, at the World Junior Championship in 2006. At the 2011 World Aquatics Championships in Shanghai, China, he competed with partner David Boudia in the synchronized 10-meter platform and finished fifth. In the 10-meter competition, he finished in sixth place.

McCrory graduated from East Chapel Hill High School and from Duke University, where he won several medals at college competitions. He won the gold medal in 10-meter platform at the 2011 US National Championships at UCLA on August 14. McCrory was named to CSCAA's list of the 100 Greatest Swimmers and Divers in History.

He retired from diving in November 2014 to pursue medical studies.

== 2012 Summer Olympics ==
McCrory and his partner David Boudia won the bronze in the synchronized 10m platform with a total score of 463.47. This was the first Olympic medal for the United States in men's diving since the 1996 games in Atlanta. He placed ninth in the men's individual 10-meter platform diving event as well.

== Personal life ==
McCrory was born on August 9, 1991, in Durham, North Carolina, to Douglas and Ana McCrory. His uncle, Gordon Downie competed in the 1976 Summer Olympics. He has a younger brother, Lucas, who swims and participates in Paralympics events. He received his B.A. and M.D. degrees from Duke University, and a Master’s in Physiology from North Carolina State University. After graduating medical school, McCrory completed a general psychiatry residency at Brown University.
