= David Boudia =

American diver (born 1989)

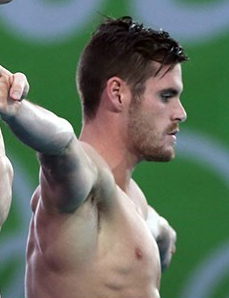
- Boudia at the 2016 Summer Olympics

Personal information
- Full name: David Alasdair Boudia
- Born: April 24, 1989 (age 37) Abilene, Texas, U.S.
- Home town: Noblesville, Indiana, U.S.
- Height: 5 ft 9 in (175 cm)

Sport
- Country: United States
- Events: 10m, 10m synchro
- College team: Purdue University
- Club: National Training Center
- Partner: Steele Johnson
- Former partners: Nick McCrory, Thomas Finchum
- Coached by: Adam Soldati, John Wingfield
Medal record
Event	1st	2nd	3rd
Olympic Games	1	1	2
World Championships	0	4	1
Pan American Games	1	0	0
FINA Diving World Cup	4	1	1
Total	6	6	4
Men's diving
Representing United States
Olympic Games
Gold medal – first place	2012 London	10 m platform
Silver medal – second place	2016 Rio de Janeiro	10 m synchro
Bronze medal – third place	2012 London	10 m synchro
Bronze medal – third place	2016 Rio de Janeiro	10 m platform
World Championships
Silver medal – second place	2009 Rome	10 m synchro
Silver medal – second place	2011 Shanghai	10 m platform
Silver medal – second place	2013 Barcelona	10 m platform
Silver medal – second place	2015 Kazan	10 m platform
Bronze medal – third place	2007 Melbourne	10 m synchro
FINA Diving World Cup
Gold medal – first place	2010 Changzhou	Team
Bronze medal – third place	2008 Beijing	10 m platform
Pan American Games
Gold medal – first place	2007 Rio	10 m synchro

David Alasdair Boudia (/boʊˈdaɪə/; born April 24, 1989) is an American diver. He won the gold medal in the 10 metre platform diving competition at the 2012 Summer Olympics and the bronze medal in the same event at the 2016 Summer Olympics. He also won a bronze medal with Nick McCrory in the men's synchronized 10 metre platform at the 2012 Summer Olympics and a silver medal in the same event with Steele Johnson at the 2016 Summer Olympics.

== Early life ==
Born in Abilene, Texas, Boudia's parents are Jim and Sheilagh Boudia. He graduated from Noblesville High School in 2007, and attended Purdue University where he was trained by Head Diving Coach Adam Solati. He resides in West Lafayette, Indiana.

He started diving in 2000, and became a member of the U.S. National Diving Team in 2005. Boudia once stated that a dive from the great height of an Olympic 10-meter platform once 'petrified' him.

== Diving career ==
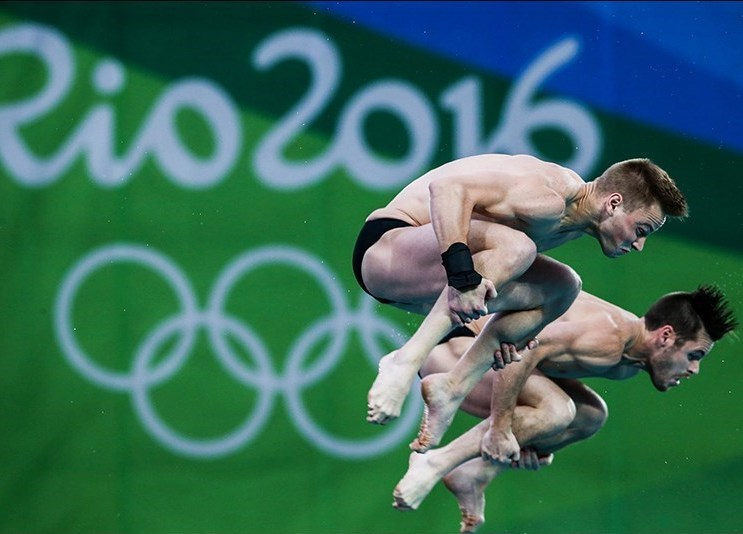
Steele Johnson and David Boudia at the Rio Summer Olympics

Boudia was named to the 2008 U.S. Olympic team in the 10-meter platform and in the synchronized 10-meter platform event with former synchro partner Thomas Finchum. Boudia and Finchum were 2009 World Championship (Rome) Silver Medalists, and 2007 World Championship (Melbourne) Bronze Medalists. With his past synchro partner, Nick McCrory, they achieved bronze medals at the 2012 Summer Olympics.

He is the winner of the Big 10 Male Tower Diving event at the Big Ten Tournament, held in 2010 at Ohio State. He is the inaugural American to break 600 points in six dives.

=== 2012 Summer Olympics ===
In his first event at the 2012 Summer Olympics, Boudia and his partner, Nicholas McCrory, won the bronze in the synchronized 10 metre platform with a combined score of 463.47, finishing behind China (486.78) and Mexico (468.90). The United States did not medal in men's divers at the 1996 Atlanta Summer Olympics; at the next two Olympiads of 2004 and 2008, no men's divers made the podium in diving.

In his second event, the 10 metre platform, Boudia barely advanced from the prelims placing eighteenth but then went on to finish third in the semi-finals to advance to the finals. In the sixth and last round, Boudia won gold with a total score of 568.65, finishing ahead of world champion Qiu Bo (566.85) and hometown favorite Tom Daley (556.95). It was the first Olympic gold for the United States in diving since the 2000 Summer Olympics, when Laura Wilkinson won the gold in the women's 10-meter platform competition; the first Olympic gold in the 10-meter platform competition by an American male diver since Greg Louganis achieved that feat at the 1988 Summer Olympics (also taking the 3-meter springboard title); and the first Olympic diving gold for an American man since Mark Lenzi's victory in the 3-meter springboard competition at the 1992 Summer Olympics.

=== 2016 Summer Olympics ===
Boudia partnered with Steele Johnson in the synchronized 10-meter platform dive at the 2016 Olympics in Rio. They won a silver behind the Chinese pair Chen Aisen and Lin Yue. In the individual 10 metre platform event, Boudia won a bronze.

After the Olympics, Boudia took a break in 2017 from international competition before making a decision on whether to retire or return for a fourth Olympics. He chose to return in fall 2017 and go for a fourth Olympics in 2020. However, in February 2018, he suffered a concussion due to an error during training that caused him to crash into the water hard, after which he experienced blackouts and dizziness.

Boudia decided to switch event from 10m platform to 3m springboard following the concussion. At the 2019 World Championships held in Gwangju, Korea, Boudia participated in the 3m springboard event, but only managed to finish 5th.

== Television ==
In November 2012, Boudia agreed to join Steve Foley as a judge on Splash. This reality show premiered on ABC on March 19, 2013.

== Book ==
Boudia wrote an autobiography, Greater Than Gold, published by Thomas Nelson in 2016.

== Personal life ==
Boudia became a Christian in 2010 through the influence of his college diving coach Adam Soldati. He openly referenced his religious beliefs in several interviews before, during, and after the 2012 Olympics. On October 12, 2012, Boudia married Sonnie Brand, whom he met while studying at Purdue University. In October 2014, Boudia and his wife welcomed their first child, Dakoda. On August 24, 2017, Boudia announced the birth of his second daughter, Mila Primm Boudia. On April 22, 2019, Knox Boudia was born, giving David his first son.

== Major competition results ==
Summer Olympics

- 3rd 10m Platform 2016 Rio de Janeiro, BRA 525.25
- 2nd Synchronised 10m Platform 2016 Rio de Janeiro, BRA 457.11
- 1st 10m Platform 2012 London, GBR 568.65
- 3rd Synchronized 10m Platform 2012 London
- 5th Synchronised 10m Platform 2008 Beijing, CHN 440.64
- 10th 10m Platform 2008 Beijing, CHN 441.45

World Championships

- 2nd 10m Platform 2011 Shanghai, CHN 544.25
- 2nd Synchronised 10m Platform 2009 Rome, ITA 456.94
- 3rd Synchronised 10m Platform 2007 Melbourne, VIC, AUS 463.56
- 5th Synchronised 10m Platform 2011 Shanghai, CHN 420.69
- 6th 10m Platform 2009 Rome, ITA 491.80

World Series

- 1st Synchronised 10m Platform 2012 Tijuana, MEX 453.57
- 2nd 10m Platform 2012 Tijuana, MEX 543.25
- 2nd Synchronised 10m Platform 2012 Moscow, RUS 448.32
- 2nd Synchronised 10m Platform 2011 Guanajuato, MEX 437.10
- 2nd 10m Platform 2010 Veracruz, MEX 528.00
- 3rd 10m Platform 2012 Moscow, RUS 518.40
- 3rd 10m Platform 2012 Dubai, UAE 521.60
- 3rd 10m Platform 2011 Sheffield, GBR 534.55
- 3rd Synchronised 10m Platform 2009 Mexico City, MEX 421.08

World Cup

- 1st Team Event 2010 Changzhou, CHN 455.35
- 4th 10m Platform 2012 London, GBR 501.10
- 4th Synchronised 10m Platform 2012 London, GBR 444.93
- 4th Synchronised 10m Platform 2010 Changzhou, CHN 448.89

Grand Prix

- 1st Synchronised 10m Platform 2010 Fort Lauderdale, FL, USA 461.19
- 1st Synchronised 10m Platform 2009 Fort Lauderdale, FL, USA 457.26
- 3rd Synchronised 10m Platform 2011 Fort Lauderdale, FL, USA 438.51
