= Luo Yutong =

Chinese diver

Personal information
- Nationality: China
- Born: October 6, 1985 (age 40) Huizhou, Guangdong

Sport
- Sport: Diving
- Event(s): 3 m, 3 m synchro
Medal record
Event	1st	2nd	3rd
Olympic Games	1	-	-
World Championships	2	-	-
Summer Universiade	1	2	0
Asian Games	1	1	-
Men's diving
Representing China
Olympic Games
Gold medal – first place	2012 London	3 m springboard synchro
World Championships
Gold medal – first place	2007 Melbourne	1 m springboard
Gold medal – first place	2011 Shanghai	3 m springboard synchro
Summer Universiade
Gold medal – first place	2013 Kazan	Team
Gold medal – first place	2007 Bangkok	Team
Silver medal – second place	2013 Kazan	3 m synchro
Silver medal – second place	2007 Bangkok	1m Springboard
Silver medal – second place	2007 Bangkok	3m Springboard
Asian Games
Gold medal – first place	Doha 2006	1 m springboard
Silver medal – second place	Doha 2006	3 m springboard

Luo Yutong (Chinese: 罗玉通; pinyin: Luó Yùtōng) (born 6 October 1985 in Huicheng, Huizhou, Guangdong) is an athlete from the People's Republic of China. He competes in diving. Luo is of Hakka ancestry.

== Major achievements ==
- 2007 World Championships – 1st 1m Springboard
- 2011 World Championships – 1st 3m synchro Springboard
- 2012 Olympic Games - 1st 3m Springboard

== External links and sources ==
- http://english.sina.com/p/1/2007/0322/107322.html
