= July 2009 in sports =

<<	July 2009					>>
Su	Mo	Tu	We	Th	Fr	Sa
			1	2	3	4
5	6	7	8	9	10	11
12	13	14	15	16	17	18
19	20	21	22	23	24	25
26	27	28	29	30	31
Sports

This list shows notable sports-related deaths, events, and notable outcomes that occurred in July of 2009.

== Deaths in July ==
- 31: Bobby Robson
- 25: Vernon Forrest
- 19: Henry Surtees
- 18: Ricardo Londoño
- 11: Arturo Gatti
- 4: Steve McNair
- 1: Alexis Argüello

== Current sporting seasons ==
=== Australian rules football 2009 ===
- Australian Football League

=== Auto racing 2009 ===
- Formula One
- Sprint Cup
- IRL IndyCar Series
- World Rally Championship
- Formula Two
- Nationwide Series
- Camping World Truck Series
- GP2
- WTTC
- V8 Supercar
- American Le Mans
- Le Mans Series
- Superleague Formula
- Rolex Sports Car Series
- FIA GT Championship
- Formula Three
- World Series by Renault
- Deutsche Tourenwagen Masters
- Super GT

=== Baseball 2009 ===
- Major League Baseball
- Nippon Professional Baseball

=== Basketball 2009 ===
- WNBA
- Philippine collegiate:
  - NCAA
  - UAAP

=== Canadian football 2009 ===
- Canadian Football League

=== Football (soccer) 2009 ===
National teams competitions

- 2010 FIFA World Cup Qualifying

International clubs competitions

- UEFA (Europe) Champions League
- Europa League
- AFC (Asia) Champions League
- CAF (Africa) Champions League
- CONCACAF (North & Central America) Champions League

Domestic (national) competitions

- Brazil
- Japan
- Norway
- Russia
- Major League Soccer (USA & Canada)
- Women's Professional Soccer (USA)

=== Golf 2009 ===
- European Tour
- PGA Tour
- LPGA Tour
- Champions Tour

=== Lacrosse 2009 ===
- Major League Lacrosse

=== Motorcycle racing 2009 ===
- Superbike World Championship
- Supersport racing

=== Rugby league 2009 ===
- Super League
- NRL

=== Rugby union 2009 ===
- Currie Cup
- Air New Zealand Cup

=== Volleyball ===
- World Grand Prix

== Days of the month ==
=== July 31, 2009 (Friday) ===
==== Baseball ====
- Major League Baseball trades made before the 4 p.m. EDT trading deadline:
  - The Chicago White Sox get pitcher Jake Peavy from the San Diego Padres for four pitching prospects.
  - Catcher Víctor Martínez goes from the Cleveland Indians to the Boston Red Sox for pitcher Justin Masterson and two minor league pitchers.
  - In a trade of first basemen, Adam LaRoche goes to the Red Sox in exchange for Casey Kotchman of the Atlanta Braves and cash.
  - The Minnesota Twins acquire shortstop Orlando Cabrera and cash from the Oakland Athletics in exchange for infielder prospect Tyler Ladendorf.
  - Pitcher Jarrod Washburn is dealt from the Seattle Mariners to the Detroit Tigers for pitcher Luke French and minor league pitcher Mauricio Robles.
  - The New York Yankees acquire utility infielder Jerry Hairston Jr. from the Cincinnati Reds for minor league catcher Chase Weems.

==== Cricket ====
- Australia in England:
  - The Ashes Series:
    - 3rd Test in Birmingham, day 2:
      - Australia 263 (James Anderson 5/80); England 116/2 (36.0 ov). England trail by 147 runs with 8 wickets remaining in the 1st innings.
- Bangladesh in West Indies:
  - 3rd ODI in Basseterre, St Kitts:
    - West Indies 248 (47.4 ov); Bangladesh 249/7 (48.5 ov). **Bangladesh win by 3 wickets, and win 3-match series 3–0**.

==== Cycling ====
- UCI Women's Road World Cup
  - Open de Suède Vårgårda Team Time Trial: (gold) **Cervélo TestTeam** (Kristin Armstrong, Regina Bruins, Carla Ryan, Christiane Soeder, Kirsten Wild, Sarah Düster) (silver) **Team Columbia–HTC Women** (Kimberly Anderson, Chantal Beltman, Emilia Fahlin, Ina-Yoko Teutenberg, Ellen van Dijk, Linda Villumsen) (bronze) **Team Flexpoint** (Susanne Ljungskog, Mirjam Melchers, Loes Gunnewijk, Loes Markerink, Trine Schmidt, Iris Slappendel)

==== Football (soccer) ====
- CAF Champions League group stage, matchday 2:
  - Group A:
    - Al-Hilal (Sudan) 1–0 (Zambia) ZESCO United

==== Golf ====
- Women's majors:
  - Women's British Open in Lytham St Annes, England, second round:
    - Leaderboard: (1) Catriona Matthew (SCO) & Giulia Sergas (ITA) 141 (−3) (3) Yuko Mitsuka (JPN) 142 (−2)
- Senior majors:
  - U.S Senior Open in Carmel, Indiana, second round:
    - Leaderboard: (1) Tim Jackson (USA) 133 (−11) (2) Joey Sindelar (USA) 134 (−10) (3) Fred Funk (USA) 135 (−9)

==== Swimming ====
- World Aquatics Championships in Rome, Italy:
  - Women's 100m freestyle:
  - Men's 200m backstroke:
    - (gold) Aaron Peirsol (USA) 1:51.92 **WR** (silver) Ryosuke Irie (JPN) 1:52.51 (bronze) Ryan Lochte (USA) 1:53.82
  - Women's 200m breaststroke:
    - (gold) Nađa Higl (SRB) 2:21.62 ER (silver) Annamay Pierse (CAN) 2:21.84 (bronze) Mirna Jukić (AUT) 2:21.97
  - Men's 200m breaststroke:
  - Men's 4 × 200 m freestyle relay:
    - (gold) United States (Michael Phelps, Ricky Berens, Dave Walters, Ryan Lochte) 6:58.55 **WR** (silver) Russia (Nikita Lobintsev, Michail Polishuk, Danila Izotov, Alexander Sukhorukov) 6:59.15 ER (bronze) Australia (Kenrick Monk, Robert Hurley, Tommaso D'Orsogna, Patrick Murphy) 7:01.65 OC

==== Volleyball ====
- FIVB World Grand Prix:
  - 1st Preliminary round:
    - Pool A in Rio de Janeiro, Brazil:
      - Brazil 3–0 Puerto Rico
      - Germany 3–0 United States
    - Pool B in Kielce, Poland:
      - Poland 2–3 Thailand
      - Japan 0–3 Netherlands
    - Pool C in Ningbo, China:
      - Russia 3–0 South Korea
      - China 3–0 Dominican Republic

==== Water polo ====
- World Aquatics Championships in Rome, Italy:
  - Women:
    - Bronze Medal Match: (bronze) Russia 10–9 Greece
    - Gold Medal Match: (silver) Canada 6–7 (gold) United States

=== July 30, 2009 (Thursday) ===
==== Baseball ====
- The New York Times reports that Manny Ramirez and David Ortiz, who were teammates on Boston Red Sox teams that won the World Series in 2004 and 2007, were among about 100 players who tested positive for performance-enhancing drugs in 2003.

==== Cricket ====
- Australia in England:
  - The Ashes Series:
    - 3rd Test in Birmingham, day 1:
      - Australia 126/1 (30 ov)
- Pakistan in Sri Lanka:
  - 1st ODI in Dambulla:
    - Sri Lanka 232/9 (50 overs); Pakistan 196 (44.4 overs). **Sri Lanka win by 36 runs, lead 5-match series 1–0**.

==== Football (soccer) ====
- UEFA Under-19 Championship in Ukraine:
  - Semifinals:
    - **England** 3–1 (a.e.t.) France
    - Serbia 1–3 **Ukraine**

==== Golf ====
- Women's majors:
  - Women's British Open in Lytham St Annes, England, first round:
    - (1) Sandra Gal (DEU) 69 (−3) (2) Song-Hee Kim (KOR) & Angela Stanford (USA) 70 (−2)
- Senior majors:
  - U.S. Open in Carmel, Indiana, third round:
    - Leaderboard: (1) Dan Forsman, Tim Jackson, Joey Sindelar (all United States) & Greg Norman (AUS) 66 (−6)

==== Swimming ====
- World Aquatics Championships in Rome, Italy:
  - Men's 200m individual medley:
  - Men's 100m freestyle:
  - Women's 200m butterfly:
  - Women's 50m backstroke:
  - Women's 4 × 200 m freestyle relay:

=== July 29, 2009 (Wednesday) ===
==== Auto racing ====
- Seven-time Formula One champion Michael Schumacher announces that he will come out of retirement to serve as Ferrari's substitute driver for Felipe Massa, who was seriously injured in an accident during qualifying for the Hungarian Grand Prix. (AP via ESPN)

==== Baseball ====
- The Philadelphia Phillies acquire 2009 American League Cy Young Award winner Cliff Lee from the Cleveland Indians for outfielder Ben Francisco and four minor league prospects. (AP via Yahoo)

==== Football (soccer) ====
- 2009 MLS All-Star Game in Sandy, Utah:
  - MLS All-Stars 1–1 (aet) (England) **Everton**. Everton wins 4–3 on penalties.

==== Swimming ====
- World Aquatics Championships in Rome, Italy:
  - Men's 200m butterfly: (gold) Michael Phelps (USA) 1:51.51 WR (silver) Paweł Korzeniowski (POL) 1:53.23 (bronze) Takeshi Matsuda (JPN) 1:53.32
  - Women's 200m freestyle: (gold) Federica Pellegrini (ITA) 1:52.98 WR (silver) Allison Schmitt (USA) 1:54.96 (bronze) Dana Vollmer (USA) 1:55.64
  - Men's 50m breaststroke: (gold) Cameron van der Burgh (RSA) 26.67 WR (silver) Felipe França Silva (BRA) 26.76 (bronze) Mark Gangloff (USA) 26.86
  - Men's 800m freestyle: (gold) Zhang Lin (CHN) 7:32.12 WR (silver) Oussama Mellouli (TUN) 7:35.27 (bronze) Ryan Cochrane (CAN) 7:41.92
  - Men's 100m freestyle semifinals: (1) Alain Bernard (FRA) 47.27
  - Men's 200m individual medley semifinals: (1) Ryan Lochte (USA) & László Cseh (HUN) 1:55.18
  - Women's 50m backstroke semifinals: (1) Anastasia Zuyeva (RUS) 27.38 WR
  - Women's 200m butterfly semifinals: (1) Katinka Hosszú (HUN) 2:04.27

=== July 28, 2009 (Tuesday) ===
==== American football ====
- Brett Favre, who was considering coming out of retirement for the second consecutive season and playing for the Minnesota Vikings, announces that he will remain retired, saying that he does not feel physically able to play for a full season. (ESPN)

==== Cricket ====
- Bangladesh in West Indies:
  - 2nd ODI in Roseau, Dominica:
    - West Indies 274/6 (50 ov, Travis Dowlin 100*); Bangladesh 276/7 (49 ov). **Bangladesh win by 3 wickets, lead 3-match series 2–0**.

==== Swimming ====
- World Aquatics Championships in Rome, Italy:
  - Men's 200m freestyle:
  - Women's 100m backstroke:
  - Women's 1500m freestyle:
  - Men's 100m backstroke:
  - Women's 100m breaststroke:
  - Men's 50m breaststroke semifinals:
  - Men's 200m butterfly semifinals:
  - Women's 200m freestyle semifinals:
  - Men's 800m freestyle semifinals:

=== July 27, 2009 (Monday) ===
==== American football ====
- NFL commissioner Roger Goodell conditionally reinstates Michael Vick following the end of his prison sentence for running a dog fighting operation. Vick will be allowed to play in preseason games and practice, provided he can find a team that will sign him, and Goodell will decide on Vick's full reinstatement no later than Week 6 of the 2009 season. (ESPN)

==== Football (soccer) ====
- UEFA Under-19 Championship in Ukraine: (teams in **bold** advance to the semifinals)
  - Group A:
    - Switzerland 0–1 **Ukraine**
    - Slovenia 1–7 **England**
      - Standings: England, Ukraine 5 points, Switzerland 4, Slovenia 1.
  - Group B:
    - Spain 0–1 **France**
    - **Serbia** 1–0 Turkey
      - Standings: Serbia 7 points, France 5, Spain 3, Turkey 1.
  - Transfer News:
    - FC Barcelona and Internazionale complete a major deal, with Samuel Eto'o joining Inter and Zlatan Ibrahimović joining Barça. The deal was initially reported to also include a loan of Alexander Hleb to Inter, but Hleb turned down the move.

==== Golf ====
- PGA Tour:
  - RBC Canadian Open in Oakville, Ontario:
    - Winner: Nathan Green (AUS) 270 (−18) PO
      - Green defeats Retief Goosen (RSA) on the second playoff hole for his first PGA Tour win.

==== Swimming ====
- World Aquatics Championships in Rome, Italy, day 2:
  - Men's 100m breaststroke: (gold) Brenton Rickard (AUS) 58.58 WR (silver) Hugues Duboscq (FRA) 58.64 (bronze) Cameron van der Burgh (RSA) 58.95
  - Women's 100m butterfly: (gold) Sarah Sjöström (SWE) 56.06 WR (silver) Jessicah Schipper (AUS) 56.23 (bronze) Jiao Liuyang (CHN) 56.86
  - Men's 50m butterfly: (gold) Milorad Čavić (SRB) 22.67 CR (silver) Matt Targett (AUS) 22.73 (bronze) Rafael Muñoz (ESP) 22.88
  - Women's 200m individual medley: (gold) Ariana Kukors (USA) 2:06.15 WR (silver) Stephanie Rice (AUS) 2:07.03 (bronze) Katinka Hosszú (HUN) 2:07.46
  - Men's 100m backstroke semifinals: (1) Junya Koga (JPN) 52.39 CR
  - Women's 100m breaststroke semifinals: (1) Rebecca Soni (USA) 1:04.84 WR
  - Women's 100m backstroke semifinals: (1) Anastasia Zuyeva (RUS) 58.48 WR
  - Men's 200m freestyle semifinals: (1) Paul Biedermann (GER) 1:43.65 CR

=== July 26, 2009 (Sunday) ===
==== Auto racing ====
- Formula One:
  - Hungarian Grand Prix in Mogyoród, Hungary:
    - (1) Lewis Hamilton (GBR) (McLaren–Mercedes) 1:38:23.876 (2) Kimi Räikkönen (FIN) (Ferrari) +11.529 (3) Mark Webber (AUS) (Red Bull–Renault) +16.886
      - Drivers' standings (after 10 of 17 races): (1) Jenson Button (GBR) (Brawn–Mercedes) 70 points (2) Webber 51.5 (3) Sebastian Vettel (GER) (Red Bull-Renault) 47
      - Constructors' standings: (1) Brawn-Mercedes 114 (2) Red Bull-Renault 98.5 (3) Ferrari 40
- Sprint Cup Series:
  - Allstate 400 at the Brickyard in Speedway, Indiana:
    - (1) Jimmie Johnson (California) (Chevrolet, Hendrick Motorsports) (2) Mark Martin (Arkansas) (Chevrolet, Hendrick Motorsports) (3) Tony Stewart (Indiana) (Chevrolet, Stewart Haas Racing)
      - Drivers' standings (after 20 of 26 races leading to the Chase for the Sprint Cup): (1) Stewart 3054 points (2) Johnson 2862 (3) Jeff Gordon (California) 2847 (Chevrolet, Hendrick Motorsports)
- IndyCar Series:
  - Rexall Edmonton Indy in Edmonton, Alberta:
    - (1) Will Power (AUS) (Penske Racing) 1:42:42.3773 (2) Hélio Castroneves (BRA) (Penske Racing) + 1.0936* (3) Scott Dixon (NZL) (Chip Ganassi Racing) + 1.3213
      - Drivers' standings (after 11 of 17 races): (1) Dixon 380 points (2) Dario Franchitti (GBR) (Chip Ganassi Racing) 377 points (3) Ryan Briscoe (AUS) (Penske Racing) 366

==== Cricket ====
- Bangladesh in West Indies:
  - 1st ODI in Roseau, Dominica:
    - Bangladesh 246/9 (50 ov); West Indies 194 (43.4 ov). **Bangladesh win by 52 runs, lead 3-match series 1–0**.

==== Cycling ====
- Tour de France:
  - Stage 21 – Montereau-Fault-Yonne to Paris Champs-Élysées (160 km): (1) Mark Cavendish (GBR) (Team Columbia–HTC) 4h 02' 18" (2) Mark Renshaw (AUS) (Team Columbia–HTC) same time (3) Tyler Farrar (USA) (Garmin–Slipstream) s.t.
    - Cavendish wins his sixth stage of this year's Tour, the first rider in 30 years that does this feat.
  - Final standings:
    - General classification: (1) Alberto Contador (ESP) (XDS Astana Team) 85h 48' 35" (2) Andy Schleck (LUX) (Tinkoff) + 4' 11" (3) Lance Armstrong (USA) (Astana) + 5' 24"
    - Points standing: (1) Thor Hushovd (NOR) (Cervélo TestTeam) 280 points (2) Mark Cavendish (GBR) (Team Columbia–HTC) 270 (3) Gerald Ciolek (GER) (Team Milram) 172
    - King of mountains standings: (1) Franco Pellizotti (ITA) (Liquigas) 210 points (2) Egoi Martínez (ESP) (Euskaltel–Euskadi) 135 (3) Contador 126

==== Football (soccer) ====
- CONCACAF Gold Cup in United States:
  - Final in East Rutherford, New Jersey:
    - **Mexico** 5–0 United States
      - Mexico wins the Gold Cup for the fifth time. This is Mexico's first win in the US in 10 years, and their biggest win in 42 years.

==== Golf ====
- Senior majors:
  - Senior British Open in Sunningdale, England:
    - (1) Loren Roberts (USA) 268 (−12) PO (2) Mark McNulty (IRL) & Fred Funk (USA) 268 (−12)
      - Roberts wins his second Senior British Open and fourth senior major in a playoff, eliminating Funk on the first extra hole and McNulty on the third.
- PGA Tour:
  - RBC Canadian Open in Oakville, Ontario:
    - Play suspended due to rain. The final round will resume Monday.
- European Tour:
  - SAS Masters in Barsebäck, Sweden:
    - (1) Ricardo González (ARG) 282 (−10) (2) Jamie Donaldson (WAL) 284 (−8) (3) Jeppe Huldahl (DEN) 286 (−6)
- LPGA Tour:
  - Evian Masters in Évian-les-Bains, France:
    - (1) Ai Miyazato (JPN) 274 (−14) PO
      - Miyazato earns her first LPGA tour win with a birdie on the first hole of a playoff with Sophie Gustafson (SWE).

==== Motorcycle racing ====
- Moto GP:
  - British motorcycle Grand Prix in North West Leicestershire, United Kingdom:
    - (1) Andrea Dovizioso (ITA) (Honda) 48:26.267 (2) Colin Edwards (USA) (Yamaha) +1.360 (3) Randy de Puniet (FRA) (Honda) +1.600
      - Riders' standings (after 10 of 17 races): (1) Valentino Rossi (ITA) (Yamaha) 187 points (2) Jorge Lorenzo (ESP) (Yamaha) 162 (3) Casey Stoner (AUS) (Ducati) 150
      - Manufacturers' standings: (1) Yamaha 230 (2) Honda 164 (3) Ducati 156
- Superbike World Championship:
  - Brno Superbike World Championship round in Brno, Czech Republic:
    - Race 1: (1) Max Biaggi (ITA) (Aprilia) 40:18.306 (2) Carlos Checa (ESP) (Honda) +3.631 (3) Jonathan Rea (GBR) (Honda) +9.948
    - Race 2: (1) Ben Spies (USA) (Yamaha) 40:15.420 (2) Biaggi +0.213 (3) Michel Fabrizio (ITA) (Ducati) +0.657
      - Riders' standings (after 10 of 14 rounds): (1) Noriyuki Haga (JPN) (Ducati) 324 points (2) Spies 319 (3) Fabrizio 273

==== Swimming ====
- World Aquatics Championships in Rome, Italy, day 1:
  - Men's 400m freestyle: (gold) Paul Biedermann (GER) 3:40.07 (WR) (silver) Oussama Mellouli (TUN) 3:41.11 (AF) (bronze) Zhang Lin (CHN) 3:41.35 (AS)
  - Women's 400m freestyle: (gold) Federica Pellegrini (ITA) 3:59.15 (WR) (silver) Joanne Jackson (GBR) 4:00.60 (bronze) Rebecca Adlington (GBR) 4:00.79
  - Women's 4 × 100 m freestyle relay: (gold) Netherlands (Inge Dekker, Ranomi Kromowidjojo, Femke Heemskerk, Marleen Veldhuis) 3:31.72 (WR) (silver) Germany (Britta Steffen 52.22 WR, Daniela Samulski, Petra Dallmann, Daniela Schreiber) 3:31.83 (bronze) Australia (Lisbeth Trickett, Marieke Guehrer, Shayne Reese, Felicity Galvez) 3:33.01
  - Men's 4 × 100 m freestyle relay: (gold) United States (Michael Phelps, Ryan Lochte, Matt Grevers, Nathan Adrian) 3:09.21 (CR) (silver) Russia (Evgeniy Lagunov, Andrey Grechin, Danila Izotov, Alexander Sukhorukov) 3:09.52 (bronze) France (Fabien Gilot, Alain Bernard, Grégory Mallet, Frédérick Bousquet) 3:09.89
  - Women's 100m butterfly semifinals: (1) Sarah Sjöström (SWE) 56.44 (WR)
  - Women's 200m individual medley semifinals: (1) Ariana Kukors (USA) 2:07.03 (WR)
  - Men's 50m butterfly semifinals: (1) Rafael Muñoz (ESP) 22.68 (CR)
  - Men's 100m breaststroke semifinals: (1) Eric Shanteau (USA) 58.96 (CR)

==== Tennis ====
- ATP World Tour:
  - Indianapolis Tennis Championships in Indianapolis, United States:
    - Final: **Robby Ginepri (USA)** bt Sam Querrey (USA) 6–2, 6–4
      - Ginepri wins the tournament for the second time and his third career title.
  - German Open Hamburg in Hamburg, Germany:
    - Final: **Nikolay Davydenko (RUS)** bt Paul-Henri Mathieu (FRA) 6–4, 6–2
      - Davydenko wins his first title this year and 15th of his career.
- WTA Tour:
  - Banka Koper Slovenia Open in Portorož, Slovenia:
    - Final: **Dinara Safina (RUS)** bt Sara Errani (ITA) 6–7(5), 6–1, 7–5
      - Safina wins her third title this year and 12th of her career.
  - Gastein Ladies in Bad Gastein, Austria:
    - Final: **Andrea Petkovic (GER)** bt Ioana Raluca Olaru (ROM) 6–2, 6–3
      - Petkovic wins her first WTA Tour title.

==== Volleyball ====
- FIVB World League:
  - Final Round in Belgrade, Serbia:
    - Bronze medal match: (bronze) Russia 3–0 Cuba
    - Final: (gold) Brazil 3–2 (silver) Serbia
      - Brazil win the World League for the eighth time and equals Italy's record. All but one of those titles are in the last decade.

=== July 25, 2009 (Saturday) ===
==== Auto racing ====
- Nationwide Series:
  - Kroger 200 in Clermont, Indiana:
    - (1) Carl Edwards (Missouri) (Ford, Roush Fenway Racing) (2) Kyle Busch (Nevada) (Toyota, Joe Gibbs Racing) (3) Matt Kenseth (Wisconsin) (Ford, Roush Fenway Racing)

==== Cycling ====
- Tour de France:
  - Stage 20 – Montélimar to Mont Ventoux (167 km): (1) Juan Manuel Gárate (ESP) (Rabobank) 4h 39' 21" (2) Tony Martin (GER) (Team Columbia–HTC) + 3" (3) Andy Schleck (LUX) (Team Saxo Bank) + 38" 4. Alberto Contador (ESP) (Astana) s.t.
    - General classification: (1) Contador 81h 46' 17" (2) Andy Schleck + 4' 11" (3) Lance Armstrong (USA) (Astana) + 5' 24"
    - Points standing: (1) Thor Hushovd (NOR) (Cervélo TestTeam) 260 points (2) Mark Cavendish (GBR) (Team Columbia–HTC) 235 (3) Gerald Ciolek (GER) (Team Milram) 148
    - King of mountains standings: (1) Franco Pellizotti (ITA) (Liquigas) 210 points (2) Egoi Martínez (ESP) (Euskaltel–Euskadi) 135 (3) Contador 126
- BMX World Championships in Adelaide, Australia:
  - Elite men: (gold) Donny Robinson (USA) 28.648 (silver) Mike Day (USA) 29.544 (bronze) Ramiro Marino (ARG) 29.774
  - Elite women: (gold) Sarah Walker (NZL) 31.879 (silver) Eva Ailloud (FRA) 32.991 (bronze) Arielle Martin (USA) 33.894

==== Diving ====
- World Aquatics Championships in Rome, Italy:
  - Men's 10 m synchro platform: (gold) Huo Liang & Lin Yue (CHN) 482.58 pts (silver) David Boudia & Thomas Finchum (USA) 456.84 (bronze) José Antonio Guerra Oliva & Jeinkler Aguirre (CUB) 456.60

==== Football (soccer) ====
- UEFA Women's Under-19 Championship in Belarus:
  - Final: England 2–0 Sweden
    - England win their first ever title in women football.

==== Golf ====
- Senior majors:
  - Senior British Open in Sunningdale, England, third round:
    - Leaderboard: (1) Greg Norman (AUS) 200 (−10) (2) Fred Funk & Loren Roberts (both United States) 201 (−9)

==== Open water swimming ====
- World Aquatics Championships in Rome, Italy:
  - Women's 25 km: (gold) Angela Maurer (GER) 5:47:48.0 (silver) Anna Uvarova (RUS) 5:47:51.9 (bronze) Federica Vitale (ITA) 5:47:52.7
  - Men's 25 km: (gold) Valerio Cleri (ITA) 5:26:31.6 (silver) Trent Grimsey (AUS) 5:26:50.7 (bronze) Vladimir Dyatchin (RUS) 5:29:29.3

==== Rugby league ====
- RLEF Euro Med Challenge:
  - Belgium 28–22 Catalonia

==== Rugby union ====
- Tri Nations Series:
  - South Africa 28–19 New Zealand in Bloemfontein
    - The Springboks open their Tri Nations campaign on a winning note, and also take first place in the IRB World Rankings from the All Blacks. Standings: South Africa 4 (1 match), New Zealand 4 (2 matches), Australia 1 (1 match)
    - Boks captain John Smit equals the record of Australia's George Gregan and England's Will Carling for most Tests as captain, with 59.

==== Synchronised swimming ====
- World Aquatics Championships in Rome, Italy:
  - Team free: (gold) Russia 99.167 pts (silver) Spain 98.167 (bronze) China 97.167
    - Russia win all 6 events they entered.

==== Volleyball ====
- FIVB World League:
  - Final Round in Belgrade, Serbia:
    - Semifinals:
      - **Brazil** 3–0 Russia
      - **Serbia** 3–1 Cuba

=== July 24, 2009 (Friday) ===
==== Cricket ====
- Pakistan in Sri Lanka:
  - 3rd Test in Colombo, day 5:
    - Pakistan 299 & 425/9d; Sri Lanka 233 & 391/4 (134.0 ov, Kumar Sangakkara 130*). **Match drawn. Sri Lanka win 3-match series 2–0.**

==== Cycling ====
- Tour de France:
  - Stage 19 – Bourgoin-Jallieu to Aubenas (195 km): (1) Mark Cavendish (GBR) (Team Columbia–HTC) 3h 50' 35" (2) Thor Hushovd (NOR) (Cervélo TestTeam) s.t. (3) Gerald Ciolek (GER) (Team Milram) s.t.
    - Cavendish gets his fifth stage win in this Tour and his ninth win in two years makes him the British rider with most stage wins.
    - General classification: (1) Alberto Contador (ESP) (XDS Astana Team) 77h 06' 18" (2) Andy Schleck (LUX) (Tinkoff) + 4' 11" (3) Lance Armstrong (USA) (Astana) + 5' 21"
    - Points standing: (1) Hushovd 260 points (2) Cavendish 235 (3) Ciolek 148
    - King of mountains standings: (1) Franco Pellizotti (ITA) (Liquigas) 196 points (2) Egoi Martínez (ESP) (Euskaltel–Euskadi) 135 (3) Pierrick Fédrigo (FRA) (Bbox Bouygues Telecom) 99

==== Diving ====
- World Aquatics Championships in Rome, Italy:
  - Women's 3 m synchro springboard: (gold) Guo Jingjing/Wu Minxia (CHN) 348.00 (silver) Tania Cagnotto/Francesca Dallapè (ITA) 329.70 (bronze) Yuliya Pakhalina/Anastasia Pozdniakova (RUS) 310.80

==== Football (soccer) ====
- UEFA Under-19 Championship in Ukraine:
  - Group A:
    - Slovenia 1–2 Switzerland
    - Ukraine 2–2 England
      - Standings (after 2 matches): Switzerland 4 points, England, Ukraine 2, Slovenia 1.
  - Group B:
    - France 1–1 Turkey
    - Serbia 2–1 Spain
      - Standings (after 2 matches): Serbia 4 points, Spain 3, France 2, Turkey 1.

==== Golf ====
- Senior majors:
  - Senior British Open in Sunningdale, England, second round:
    - Leaderboard: (1) Fred Funk (USA) 129 (−11) (2) Sam Torrance (SCO) 132 (−8) (3) Loren Roberts (USA) 134 (−6)

==== Rugby league ====
- RLEF Euro Bowl:
  - Latvia 6–40 Ukraine

==== Synchronised swimming ====
- World Aquatics Championships in Rome, Italy:
  - Duet free: (gold) Natalia Ishchenko/Svetlana Romashina (RUS) 98.833 (silver) Andrea Fuentes/Gemma Mengual (ESP) 98.333 (bronze) Jiang Tingting/Jiang Wenwen (CHN) 97.000

==== Volleyball ====
- FIVB World League:
  - Final Round in Belgrade, Serbia: (teams in **bold** advance to the semifinals)
    - Pool E: Russia 1–3 Serbia
      - Standings: **Serbia** 6 points, **Russia** 3, USA 0.
    - Pool F: Brazil 3–0 Argentina
      - Standings: **Brazil** 6 points, **Cuba** 3, Argentina 0.

=== July 23, 2009 (Thursday) ===
==== Baseball ====
- Major League Baseball:
  - Mark Buehrle of the Chicago White Sox throws the 18th perfect game in the history of Major League Baseball, and became the sixth pitcher in the history of the game to hurl both a no-hitter and a perfect game as the White Sox beat the Tampa Bay Rays, 5–0. The game was played in two hours and three minutes, the fastest perfect game since Tom Browning of the Cincinnati Reds beat the Los Angeles Dodgers on September 18, 1988, who took an hour and 51 minutes.

==== Cricket ====
- Pakistan in Sri Lanka:
  - 3rd Test in Colombo, day 4:
    - Pakistan 299 & 425/9d (Shoaib Malik 134); Sri Lanka 233 & 183/3 (59.0 ov). Sri Lanka require another 309 runs with 7 wickets remaining.

==== Cycling ====
- Tour de France:
  - Stage 18 – Annecy (40 km ITT): (1) Alberto Contador (ESP) (Astana) 48' 30" (2) Fabian Cancellara (SUI) (Team Saxo Bank) + 3" (3) Mikhail Ignatiev (RUS) (Team Katusha) + 15"
    - General classification: (1) Contador 73h 15' 39" (2) Andy Schleck (LUX) (Team Saxo Bank) + 4' 11" (3) Lance Armstrong (USA) (Astana) + 5' 25"
    - Points standing: (1) Thor Hushovd (NOR) (Cervélo TestTeam) 230 points (2) Mark Cavendish (GBR) (Team Columbia–HTC) 200 (3) José Joaquín Rojas (ESP) (Caisse d'Epargne) 126
    - King of mountains standings: (1) Franco Pellizotti (ITA) (Liquigas) 196 points (2) Egoi Martínez (ESP) (Euskaltel–Euskadi) 118 (3) Pierrick Fédrigo (FRA) (Bbox Bouygues Telecom) 99

==== Diving ====
- World Aquatics Championships in Rome, Italy:
  - Men's 3 m springboard: (gold) He Chong (CHN) 505.20 points (silver) Troy Dumais (USA) 498.40 (bronze) Alexandre Despatie (CAN) 490.30

==== Football (soccer) ====
- CONCACAF Gold Cup in United States:
  - Semifinals in Chicago:
    - Honduras 0–2 **United States**
    - Costa Rica 1–1 **Mexico**, Mexico win 5–3 in penalty shootout
      - The USA and Mexico will renew their rivalry in a rematch of the 2007 Final.

==== Golf ====
- Senior majors:
  - Senior British Open in Sunningdale, England, first round:
    - Leaderboard: (1) Fred Funk (USA) 64 (−6) (2) Jay Haas (USA), Loren Roberts (USA), Des Smyth (IRL) & Christopher Williams (RSA) 66 (−4)

==== Synchronised swimming ====
- World Aquatics Championships in Rome, Italy:
  - Solo free: (gold) Natalia Ishchenko (RUS) 98.833 (silver) Gemma Mengual (ESP) 98.333 (bronze) Beatrice Adelizzi (ITA) 95.500

==== Volleyball ====
- FIVB World League:
  - Final Round in Belgrade, Serbia:
    - Pool E: United States 0–3 Russia
      - Russia and Serbia advance to the semifinals.
    - Pool F: Cuba 1–3 Brazil

=== July 22, 2009 (Wednesday) ===
==== Cricket ====
- Pakistan in Sri Lanka:
  - 3rd Test in Colombo, day 3:
    - Pakistan 299 & 300/5 (95.0 ov, Shoaib Malik 106*); Sri Lanka 233. Pakistan led by 366 runs with 5 wickets remaining.

==== Cycling ====
- Tour de France:
  - Stage 17 – Bourg-Saint-Maurice to Le Grand-Bornand (169 km): (1) Fränk Schleck (LUX) (Tinkoff) 4h 53' 54" (2) Alberto Contador (ESP) (XDS Astana Team) same time (3) Andy Schleck (LUX) (Team Saxo Bank) s.t.
    - General classification: (1) Contador 72h 27' 9" (2) Andy Schleck + 2' 26" (3) Fränk Schleck +3' 25" 4. Lance Armstrong (USA) (Astana) +3' 55"
    - Points standing: (1) Thor Hushovd (NOR) (Cervélo TestTeam) 230 points (2) Mark Cavendish (GBR) (Team Columbia–HTC) 200 (3) José Joaquín Rojas (ESP) (Caisse d'Epargne) 126
    - King of mountains standings: (1) Franco Pellizotti (ITA) (Liquigas) 196 points (2) Egoi Martínez (ESP) (Euskaltel–Euskadi) 118 (3) Pierrick Fédrigo (FRA) (Bbox Bouygues Telecom) 97

==== Football (soccer) ====
- UEFA Women's Under-19 Championship in Belarus:
  - Semifinals:
    - France 2–5 (ET) Sweden
      - Sofia Jakobsson scores a hat trick for Sweden.
    - England 3–0 Switzerland

==== Open water swimming ====
- World Aquatics Championships in Rome, Italy:
  - Women's 10 km: (gold) Keri-anne Payne (GBR) 2:01:37.1 (silver) Ekaterina Seliverstova (RUS) 2:01:38.0 (bronze) Martina Grimaldi (ITA) 2:01:38.6
  - Men's 10 km: (gold) Thomas Lurz (GER) 1:52:06.9 (silver) Andrew Gemmell (USA) 1:52:08.3 (bronze) Fran Crippen (USA) 1:52:10.7

==== Synchronised swimming ====
- World Aquatics Championships in Rome, Italy:
  - Free combination: (gold) Spain 98.333 (silver) China 97.667 (bronze) Canada 96.167

==== Volleyball ====
- FIVB World League:
  - Final Round in Belgrade, Serbia:
    - Pool E: Serbia 3–0 United States
    - Pool F: Argentina 1–3 Cuba

=== July 21, 2009 (Tuesday) ===
==== Cricket ====
- Pakistan in Sri Lanka:
  - 3rd Test in Colombo, day 2:
    - Pakistan 299 & 16/1 (9.0 ov); Sri Lanka 233. Pakistan led by 82 runs with 9 wickets remaining.

==== Cycling ====
- Tour de France:
  - Stage 16 – Martigny to Bourg-Saint-Maurice (160 km): (1) Mikel Astarloza (ESP) (Euskaltel–Euskadi) 4hr 14' 20" (2) Sandy Casar (FRA) (Groupama–FDJ United) +6" (3) Pierrick Fédrigo (FRA) (Team TotalEnergies) +6"
    - General classification: (1) Alberto Contador (ESP) (Astana) 63h 17′ 56″ (2) Lance Armstrong (USA) (Astana) + 1' 37" (3) Bradley Wiggins (GBR) (Garmin–Slipstream) + 1' 46"
    - Points standing: (1) Thor Hushovd (NOR) (Cervélo TestTeam) 218 points (2) Mark Cavendish (GBR) (Team Columbia–HTC) 200 (3) José Joaquín Rojas (ESP) (Caisse d'Epargne) 126
    - King of mountains standings: (1) Franco Pellizotti (ITA) (Liquigas) 159 points (2) Egoi Martínez (ESP) (Euskaltel–Euskadi) 101 (3) Pierrick Fédrigo (FRA) (Bbox Bouygues Telecom) 97

==== Diving ====
- World Aquatics Championships in Rome, Italy:
  - Women's 3 m springboard: (gold) Guo Jingjing (CHN) 388.20 pts, (silver) Émilie Heymans (CAN) 346.45, (bronze) Tania Cagnotto (ITA) 341.25
  - Men's 10 m platform: (gold) Tom Daley (GBR) 539.85 pts, (silver) Qiu Bo (CHN) 532.20, (bronze) Luxin Zhou (CHN) 530.55

==== Football (soccer) ====
- UEFA Under-19 Championship in Ukraine:
  - Group A:
    - England 1–1 Switzerland
    - Ukraine 0–0 Slovenia
  - Group B:
    - France 1–1 Serbia
    - Turkey 1–2 Spain

==== Korfball ====
- World Games in Kaohsiung, Chinese Taipei:
  - 7th–8th places: Australia 18–31 Great Britain
  - 5th–6th places: Portugal 18–19 Czech Republic
  - 3rd–4th places: Russia 18–25 (bronze) Chinese Taipei
  - Final: (silver) Belgium 20–25 (gold) Netherlands

==== Open water swimming ====
- World Aquatics Championships in Rome, Italy:
  - Women's 5 km: (gold) Melissa Gorman (AUS) 56:55.8 (silver) Larisa Ilchenko (RUS) 56:56.3 (bronze) Poliana Okimoto (BRA) 56:59.3
  - Men's 5 km: (gold) Thomas Lurz (GER) 56:26.9 (silver) Spyridon Gianniotis (GRE) 56:27.2 (bronze) Chad Ho (RSA) 56:41.9

==== Synchronised swimming ====
- World Aquatics Championships in Rome, Italy:
  - Duet technical: (gold) Anastasia Davydova/Svetlana Romashina (RUS) 98.667 (silver) Andrea Fuentes/Gemma Mengual (ESP) 97.333 (bronze) Jiang Tingting/Jiang Wenwen (CHN) 95.667

=== July 20, 2009 (Monday) ===
==== Cricket ====
- Australia in England:
  - The Ashes Series:
    - 2nd Test at Lord's, London, day 5:
      - England 425 & 311/6d; Australia 215 & 406 (107 ov, Michael Clarke 136, Andrew Flintoff 5/92). **England win by 115 runs and lead the 5-match series 1–0.**
        - England win an Ashes Test at Lord's for the first time in 75 years.
- Bangladesh in West Indies:
  - 2nd Test in St George's, Grenada, day 4:
    - West Indies 237 & 209; Bangladesh 232 & 217/6 (54.4 ov). **Bangladesh win by 4 wickets and win the 2-match series 2–0.**
      - Bangladesh win their first ever Test series overseas.
- Pakistan in Sri Lanka:
  - 3rd Test in Colombo, day 1:
    - Pakistan 289/7 (86.0 ov)

==== Korfball ====
- World Games in Kaohsiung – day 4:
  - 5th–8th places:
    - Portugal 22–10 Australia
    - Great Britain 12–13 Czech Republic
  - 1st–4th places:
    - Belgium 24–8 Russia
    - Chinese Taipei 13–29 Netherlands

==== Synchronised swimming ====
- World Aquatics Championships in Rome, Italy:
  - Solo technical: (gold) Natalia Ishchenko (RUS) 98.667 (silver) Gemma Mengual (ESP) 97.833 (bronze) Marie-Pier Boudreau Gagnon (CAN) 96.000

=== July 19, 2009 (Sunday) ===
==== Cricket ====
- Australia in England:
  - The Ashes Series:
    - 2nd Test at Lord's, London, day 4:
      - England 425 & 311/6d; Australia 215 & 313/5 (86.0 ov, Michael Clarke 125*). Australia require another 209 runs with 5 wickets remaining.
- Bangladesh in West Indies:
  - 2nd Test in St George's, Grenada, day 3:
    - West Indies 237 & 192/8 (65.2 ov); Bangladesh 232. West Indies led by 197 runs with 2 wickets remaining.

==== Cycling ====
- Tour de France:
  - Stage 15 – Pontarlier to Verbier (207 km): (1) Alberto Contador (ESP) (Astana) 5h 03' 58" (2) Andy Schleck (LUX) (Team Saxo Bank) + 43" (3) Vincenzo Nibali (ITA) (Liquigas) + 1' 03"
    - General classification: (1) Alberto Contador (ESP) (Astana) 63h 17′ 56″ (2) Lance Armstrong (USA) (Astana) + 1' 37" (3) Bradley Wiggins (GBR) (Garmin–Slipstream) + 1' 46"
    - Points standing: (1) Thor Hushovd (NOR) (Cervélo TestTeam) 218 points (2) Mark Cavendish (GBR) (Team Columbia–HTC) 200 (3) José Joaquín Rojas (ESP) (Caisse d'Epargne) 126
    - King of mountains standings: (1) Franco Pellizotti (ITA) (Liquigas) 109 points (2) Egoi Martínez (ESP) (Euskaltel–Euskadi) 101 (3) Pierrick Fédrigo (FRA) (Bbox Bouygues Telecom) 65

==== Diving ====
- World Aquatics Championships in Rome, Italy:
  - Women's 1 m springboard: (gold) Yuliya Pakhalina (RUS) 325.05 points (silver) Wu Minxia (CHN) 311.90 (bronze) Wang Han (CHN) 303.95
  - Women's 10 m synchro platform: (gold) Chen Ruolin/Wang Xin (CHN) 369.18 (silver) Mary Beth Dunnichay/Haley Ishimatsu (USA) 324.66 (bronze) Leong Mun Yee/Pandelela Rinong Pamg (MAS) 321.66

==== Field hockey ====
- Women's Champions Trophy in Sydney, Australia:
  - Final: (gold) Argentina 0–0 (silver) Australia. Argentina win 4–3 by penalty strokes
    - Argentina win the Trophy for the second straight time, and third time overall.
  - 3rd place playoff: (bronze) Netherlands 5–2 Germany
  - 5th place playoff: China 7–0 England

==== Football (soccer) ====
- CONCACAF Gold Cup in United States:
  - Quarterfinals in Arlington, Texas:
    - Guadeloupe 1–5 **Costa Rica**
    - **Mexico** 4–0 Haiti
- CAF Champions League group stage, matchday 1:
  - Group B:
    - TP Mazembe (Democratic Republic of the Congo) 2–0 (Nigeria) Heartland
    - Monomotapa United (Zimbabwe) 2–1 (Tunisia) Étoile du Sahel
- UEFA Women's Under-19 Championship in Belarus: (teams in **bold** advance to the semifinals)
  - Group A:
    - Germany 9–0 Belarus
    - **Switzerland** 0–2 **France**
      - Standings: Switzerland, France, Germany 6 points, Belarus 0.
  - Group B:
    - Norway 1–2 **Sweden**
    - **England** 4–0 Iceland
      - Standings: England 7 points, Sweden 6, Norway 2, Iceland 1.

==== Golf ====
- Men's majors:
  - The Open Championship in South Ayrshire, Scotland:
    - (1) Stewart Cink (USA) & Tom Watson (USA) 278 (−2) (3) Chris Wood (ENG) & Lee Westwood (ENG) 279 (−1)
      - Cink defeats Watson in a 4-hole playoff by 6 strokes and wins his first major, denying Watson from becoming the oldest major champion.
- PGA Tour:
  - U.S. Bank Championship in Milwaukee in Brown Deer, Wisconsin:
    - Winner: Bo Van Pelt (USA) 267 (−13) PO
      - Van Pelt wins for the first time on the PGA Tour, defeating John Mallinger (USA) on the second hole of a sudden-death playoff.

==== Korfball ====
- World Games in Kaohsiung – day 3:
  - Pool A:
    - Netherlands 37–10 Australia
    - Czech Republic 15–19 Russia
  - Pool B:
    - Belgium 26–18 Portugal
    - Chinese Taipei 17–14 Great Britain

==== Motorcycle racing ====
- Moto GP:
  - German motorcycle Grand Prix in Hohenstein-Ernstthal, Germany:
    - (1) Valentino Rossi (ITA) (Yamaha) (2) Jorge Lorenzo (ESP) (Yamaha) (3) Dani Pedrosa (ESP) (Honda)
      - Riders' standings (after 9 of 17 races): (1) Rossi 176 points (2) Lorenzo 162 (3) Casey Stoner (AUS) (Ducati) 148
      - Manufacturers' standings: (1) Yamaha 220 points (2) Ducati 148 (3) Honda 126

==== Synchronised swimming ====
- World Aquatics Championships in Rome, Italy:
  - Team technical: (gold) Russia 98.833 points (silver) Spain 97.833 (bronze) China 96.667

==== Tennis ====
- ATP World Tour:
  - Swedish Open in Båstad, Sweden:
    - Final: Robin Söderling (SWE) def. Juan Mónaco (ARG) 6–3, 7–6(4)
      - Söderling wins his first ATP Tour title this year and fourth of his career.
  - MercedesCup in Stuttgart, Germany:
    - Final: Jérémy Chardy (FRA) def. Victor Hănescu (ROU) 1–6, 6–3, 6–4
      - Chardy wins his first ATP Tour title.
- WTA Tour:
  - Internazionali Femminili di Palermo in Palermo, Italy:
    - Final: Flavia Pennetta (ITA) def. Sara Errani (ITA) 6–1, 6–2
      - Pennetta wins her first WTA Tour title this year, and the seventh of her career.
  - ECM Prague Open in Prague, Czech Republic:
    - Final: Sybille Bammer (AUT) def. Francesca Schiavone (ITA) 7–6(4), 6–2
      - Bammer wins her first WTA Tour title this year, and the second of her career.

==== Volleyball ====
- FIVB World League:
  - Pool D:
    - Brazil 3–0 Venezuela
      - Final standings: Brazil 33 points, Finland 21, Poland 13, Venezuela 5.

=== July 18, 2009 (Saturday) ===
==== Auto racing ====
- Nationwide Series:
  - Missouri-Illinois Dodge Dealers 250 in Madison, Illinois:
    - (1) Kyle Busch (Nevada) (Toyota, Joe Gibbs Racing) (2) Reed Sorenson (Georgia (U.S. state)) (Toyota, Braun Racing) (3) Carl Edwards (Missouri) (Ford, Roush Fenway Racing)

==== Cricket ====
- Australia in England:
  - The Ashes Series:
    - 2nd Test at Lord's, London, day 3:
      - England 425 & 311/6 (71.2 ov); Australia 215. England led by 521 runs with 4 wickets remaining.
- Bangladesh in West Indies:
  - 2nd Test in St George's, Grenada, day 2:
    - West Indies 237 & 56/1 (23.0 ov); Bangladesh 232. West Indies led by 61 runs with 9 wickets remaining.
- ICC Intercontinental Cup in Rotterdam, Netherlands, day 4:
  - Canada 177 & 419/9d; Netherlands 229 & 233/8 (103.0 ov). **Match drawn**

==== Cycling ====
- Tour de France:
  - Stage 14 – Colmar to Besançon (199 km): (1) Sergei Ivanov (RUS) (Team Katusha) 4h 37' 46" (2) Nicolas Roche (IRL) (Ag2r–La Mondiale) + 16" (3) Hayden Roulston (NZL) (Cervélo TestTeam) + 16"
    - General classification: (1) Rinaldo Nocentini (ITA) (Ag2r–La Mondiale) 58h 13′ 52″ (2) George Hincapie (USA) (Team Columbia–HTC) + 5" (3) Alberto Contador (ESP) (Astana) + 6"
    - Points standing: (1) Thor Hushovd (NOR) (Cervélo TestTeam) 218 points (2) Mark Cavendish (GBR) (Team Columbia–HTC) 200 (3) José Joaquín Rojas (ESP) (Caisse d'Epargne) 125 (Cavendish finished 13th, but was relegated to 154th place by decision of the commissaires for blocking Hushovd in the run-in).
    - King of mountains standings: (1) Franco Pellizotti (ITA) (Liquigas) 98 points (2) Egoi Martínez (ESP) (Euskaltel–Euskadi) 95 (3) Brice Feillu (FRA) (Agritubel) 64
    - A spectator was killed, and two others injured, by a police motorcycle at Wittelsheim, about 40 km into the stage.

==== Diving ====
- World Aquatics Championships in Rome, Italy:
  - Women's 10 m platform: (gold) Paola Espinosa (MEX) 428.25 points (silver) Chen Ruolin (CHN) 417.60 (bronze) Kang Li (CHN) 410.35
  - Men's 3 m synchro springboard: (gold) Qin Kai/Wang Feng (CHN) 467.94 points (silver) Troy Dumais/Kristian Ipsen (USA) 445.59 (bronze) Alexandre Despatie/Reuben Ross (CAN) 428.64

==== Field hockey ====
- Women's Champions Trophy in Sydney, Australia: (teams in **bold** advance to the final)
  - China 4–1 England
  - **Australia** 2–1 Netherlands
  - **Argentina** 0–0 Germany
    - Final standings: Argentina 11 points, Australia 10, Netherlands 8, Germany 7, China 4, England 1.

==== Football (soccer) ====
- CONCACAF Gold Cup in United States:
  - Quarterfinals in Philadelphia:
    - Canada 0–1 **Honduras**
    - **United States** 2–1 (ET) Panama
- CAF Champions League group stage, matchday 1:
  - Group A:
    - ZESCO United (Zambia) 1–1 (Nigeria) Kano Pillars
    - Al-Merreikh (Sudan) 0–0 (Sudan) Al-Hilal

==== Golf ====
- Men's majors:
  - The Open Championship in South Ayrshire, Scotland, third round:
    - Leaderboard: (1) Tom Watson (USA) 206 (−4) (2) Mathew Goggin (AUS) & Ross Fisher (ENG) 207 (−3)
    - The 59-year-old Watson will attempt to win his sixth Open and become the oldest player ever to win a regular major championship.

==== Korfball ====
- World Games in Kaohsiung – day 2:
  - Pool A:
    - Russia 18–12 Australia
    - Czech Republic 10–34 Netherlands
  - Pool B:
    - Great Britain 11–15 Portugal
    - Chinese Taipei 16–30 Belgium

==== Rugby league ====
- RLEF European Shield:
  - Germany 30–42 Italy
    - Italy win the trophy for the second consecutive year.

==== Rugby union ====
- Tri Nations Series:
  - New Zealand 22–16 Australia in Auckland
    - Australia flanker George Smith becomes the 10th rugby union player with 100 international appearances.
- 2011 Rugby World Cup qualifying:
  - Oceania Qualification Playoff, second leg in Port Moresby:
    - Papua New Guinea 12–73 Samoa
      - Samoa win 188–19 on aggregate and qualify to the World Cup.

==== Volleyball ====
- FIVB World League: (teams in **bold** advance to the final round)
  - Pool A:
    - China 2–3 Italy
    - **United States** 3–0 Netherlands
      - Final Standings: **USA** 27 points, Italy 22, Netherlands 13, China 10.
  - Pool B:
    - **Serbia** 3–1 South Korea
      - Final Standings: **Serbia** 24 points, **Argentina 21**, France 18, Korea 9.
  - Pool C:
    - Bulgaria 0–3 **Russia**
    - **Cuba** 3–1 Japan
      - Final Standings: **Cuba** 26 points, **Russia** 23, Bulgaria 15, Japan 8.
      - Russia advance to the final round as the best runner-up.
  - Pool D:
    - **Brazil** 3–0 Venezuela
      - Standings: **Brazil** 30 points (11 matches), Finland 21 (12), Poland 13 (12), Venezuela 5 (11).

=== July 17, 2009 (Friday) ===
==== Athletics ====
- Golden League: (GL indicates Golden League event, athletes in **bold** are in contention for the 1M$ jackpot)
  - Meeting Areva in Saint-Denis, France:
    - Men:
      - 100 Metres (GL): (gold) Usain Bolt (JAM) 9.79
      - 400 Metres (GL): (gold) Jeremy Wariner (USA) 45.28
      - 800 Metres: (gold) Ismail Ahmed Ismail (SUD) 1:45.85
      - 3000 Metres (GL): (gold) **Kenenisa Bekele (ETH)** 7:28.64
      - 3000 Metres Steeplechase: (gold) Mahiedine Mekhissi-Benabbad (FRA) 8:13.23
      - 110 Metres Hurdles (GL): (gold) Dexter Faulk (USA) 13.14
      - Pole Vault: (gold) Renaud Lavillenie (FRA) 5.70
      - Triple Jump: (gold) Phillips Idowu (GBR) 17.17
      - Javelin Throw (GL): (gold) Andreas Thorkildsen (NOR) 88.03
    - Women:
      - 100 Metres (GL): (gold) **Kerron Stewart (JAM)** 10.99
      - 400 Metres (GL): (gold) **Sanya Richards (USA)** 49.34
      - 800 Metres: (gold) Anna Willard (USA) 1:58.80
      - 100 Metres Hurdles (GL): (gold) Dawn Harper (USA) 12.68
      - 400 Metres Hurdles: (gold) Anna Jesień (POL) 54.37
      - High Jump (GL): (gold) Blanka Vlašić (CRO) 1.99
      - Pole Vault (GL): (gold) **Yelena Isinbayeva (RUS)** 4.65

==== Basketball ====
- Philippine Basketball Association Fiesta Conference Finals at Quezon City:
  - Game 7: San Miguel Beermen 90, Barangay Ginebra Kings 79, **San Miguel wins 4–3**.
    - In the fourth Finals meeting between the two San Miguel Corporation teams, the Beermen clinch their 18th league championship and second Fiesta Conference championship, with second-year player Jonas Villanueva winning the Finals MVP honors.

==== Cricket ====
- Australia in England:
  - The Ashes Series:
    - 2nd Test at Lord's, London, day 2:
      - England 425 (109.4 ov, Andrew Strauss 161); Australia 156/8 (49 ov). Australia trail by 269 runs with 2 wickets remaining in the first innings.
- Bangladesh in West Indies:
  - 2nd Test in St George's, Grenada, day 1:
    - West Indies 237 (76.1 ov); Bangladesh 35/1 (10.0 ov). Bangladesh trail by 202 runs with 9 wickets remaining in the 1st innings.
- ICC Intercontinental Cup in Rotterdam, Netherlands, day 3:
  - Canada 177 & 419/9d (Sunil Dhaniram 144); Netherlands 229 & 120/5 (44.0 ov). Netherlands require another 248 runs with 5 wickets remaining.

==== Cycling ====
- Tour de France:
  - Stage 13 – Vittel to Colmar (200 km): (1) Heinrich Haussler (GER) (Cervélo TestTeam) 4h 56' 26" (2) Amets Txurruka (ESP) (Euskaltel–Euskadi) + 4' 11" (3) Brice Feillu (FRA) (Agritubel) + 6' 13"
    - General classification: (1) Rinaldo Nocentini (ITA) (Ag2r–La Mondiale) 53h 30′ 30″ (2) Alberto Contador (ESP) (Astana) + 6" (3) Lance Armstrong (USA) (Astana) + 8"
    - Points standing: (1) Thor Hushovd (NOR) (Cervélo TestTeam) 205 points (2) Mark Cavendish (GBR) (Team Columbia–HTC) 200 (3) José Joaquín Rojas (ESP) (Caisse d'Epargne) 116
    - King of mountains standings: (1) Franco Pellizotti (ITA) (Liquigas) 98 points (2) Egoi Martínez (ESP) (Euskaltel–Euskadi) 95 (3) Feillu 64

==== Diving ====
- World Aquatics Championships in Rome, Italy:
  - Men's 1 m springboard: (gold) Qin Kai (China) 449.00 points (silver) Zhang Xinhua (China) 445.90 (bronze) Matthew Mitcham (Australia) 440.20

==== Golf ====
- Men's majors:
  - The Open Championship in South Ayrshire, Scotland, second round:
    - Leaderboard: (1) Steve Marino (USA) & Tom Watson (USA) 135 (−5) (3) Mark Calcavecchia (USA) 136 (−4)
    - Watson, two months shy of his 60th birthday, becomes the oldest player to lead at the end of any round in a major championship since such records were first officially kept after World War II.
    - Tiger Woods scores 5-over-par 145 and misses the cut by one stroke. This is only the second time he misses the cut in a major since he turned pro.

==== Korfball ====
- World Games in Kaohsiung – day 1:
  - Pool A:
    - Czech Republic 21–16 Australia
    - Netherlands 35–8 Russia
  - Pool B:
    - Belgium 25–13 Great Britain
    - Chinese Taipei 26–19 Portugal

==== Volleyball ====
- FIVB World League: (teams in **bold** advance to the final round)
  - Pool A:
    - China 0–3 Italy
    - **United States** 3–0 Netherlands
      - Standings: **USA** 24 points (11 matches), Italy 20 (11).
      - Team USA punches its ticket into the final stage. Italy secure second place.
  - Pool B:
    - **Serbia** 3–1 South Korea
    - **Argentina** 3–2 France
      - Standings: **Serbia** 21 points (11 matches), **Argentina 21** (12), France 18 (12).
      - Argentina claim a berth in the final stage, as Serbia are already in the final stage as host.
  - Pool C:
    - Bulgaria 0–3 Russia
    - Cuba 3–0 Japan
      - Standings: Cuba 23 points (11 matches), Russia 20 (11), Bulgaria 15 (11).
      - Cuba and Russia secure at least second place.

=== July 16, 2009 (Thursday) ===
==== Cricket ====
- Australia in England:
  - The Ashes Series:
    - 2nd Test at Lord's, London, day 1:
      - England 364/6 (90.0 ov, Andrew Strauss 161*)
- ICC Intercontinental Cup in Rotterdam, Netherlands, day 2:
  - Canada 177 & 215/3 (50.0 ov); Netherlands 229. Canada led by 163 runs with 7 wickets remaining.

==== Cycling ====
- Tour de France:
  - Stage 12 – Tonnerre to Vittel (200 km): (1) Nicki Sørensen (DEN) (Team Saxo Bank) 4h 52' 24" (2) Laurent Lefèvre (FRA) (Bbox Bouygues Telecom) + 48" (3) Franco Pellizotti (ITA) (Liquigas) s.t.
    - General classification: (1) Rinaldo Nocentini (ITA) (Ag2r–La Mondiale) 48h 27′ 21″ (2) Alberto Contador (ESP) (Astana) + 6" (3) Lance Armstrong (USA) (Astana) + 8"
    - Points standing: (1) Mark Cavendish (GBR) (Team Columbia–HTC) 200 points (2) Thor Hushovd (NOR) (Cervélo TestTeam) 190 (3) José Joaquín Rojas (ESP) (Caisse d'Epargne) 116
    - King of mountains standings: (1) Egoi Martínez (ESP) (Euskaltel–Euskadi) 88 points (2) Pellizotti 71 (3) Christophe Kern (FRA) (Cofidis) 59

==== Field hockey ====
- Women's Champions Trophy in Sydney, Australia:
  - Netherlands 2–2 Argentina
  - England 0–4 Australia
    - Standings (after 4 matches): Argentina 10 points, Netherlands 8, Australia 7, Germany 6, China, England 1.

==== Football (soccer) ====
- UEFA Women's Under-19 Championship in Belarus:
  - Group A:
    - Belarus 0–3 France
    - Switzerland 3–0 Germany
      - Standing (after 2 matches): Switzerland 6 points, Germany, France 3, Belarus 0.
  - Group B:
    - Sweden 2–1 Iceland
    - England 0–0 Norway
      - Standings: England 4, Sweden 3, Norway 2, Iceland 1.

==== Golf ====
- Men's majors:
  - The Open Championship in South Ayrshire, Scotland, first round:
    - (1) Miguel Ángel Jiménez (ESP) 64 (−6) (2) Ben Curtis, Tom Watson (both United States) & Kenichi Kuboya (JPN) 65 (−5)
      - Jiménez sinks a 45-foot (14 m) birdie putt on the 18th hole to deny the five-time Open champion Watson, two months shy of his 60th birthday, a share of the first-day lead.

==== Lacrosse ====
- Major League Lacrosse All-Star Game in Denver, Colorado:
  - Old School 22, Young Guns 21 (OT)

==== Multi-sport event ====
- The World Games open in Kaohsiung, Taiwan.

==== Volleyball ====
- FIVB World League:
  - Pool B:
    - Argentina 3–1 France
      - Standings: Argentina 19 points (11 matches), Serbia 18 (10), France 17 (11).
  - Pool D:
    - Poland 3–2 Finland
      - Standings: Brazil 27 points (10 matches), Finland 21 (12), Poland 13 (12).

=== July 15, 2009 (Wednesday) ===
==== Cricket ====
- ICC Intercontinental Cup in Rotterdam, Netherlands, day 1:
  - Canada 177; Netherlands 74/3 (32.0 ov). Netherlands trail by 103 runs with 7 wickets remaining in the 1st innings.

==== Cycling ====
- Tour de France:
  - Stage 11 – Vatan to Saint-Fargeau (192 km): (1) Mark Cavendish (GBR) (Team Columbia–HTC) 4h 17' 55" (2) Tyler Farrar (USA) (Garmin–Slipstream) s.t. (3) Yauheni Hutarovich (BLR) (Française des Jeux) s.t.
    - Cavendish gets his fourth stage win in this Tour, equalling his achievement from last year, and matching Barry Hoban's record of eight stages won by a British cyclist (1967–75).
    - General classification: (1) Rinaldo Nocentini (ITA) (Decathlon CMA CGM Team) 43h 28' 59" (2) Alberto Contador (ESP) (XDS Astana Team) +6" (3) Lance Armstrong (USA) (Astana) +8"
    - Points standing: (1) Cavendish 176 points (2) Thor Hushovd (NOR) (Cervélo TestTeam) 169 (3) José Joaquín Rojas (ESP) (Caisse d'Epargne) 110
    - King of mountains standings: (1) Egoi Martínez (ESP) (Euskaltel–Euskadi) 79 points (2) Christophe Kern (FRA) (Cofidis) 59 (3) Franco Pellizotti (ITA) (Liquigas) 56

==== Field hockey ====
- Women's Champions Trophy in Sydney, Australia:
  - China 2–3 Germany
  - Argentina 3–1 England
    - Standings: Argentina 9 points (3 matches), Netherlands 7 (3), Germany 6 (4), Australia 4 (3), China 1 (4), England 1 (3).

==== Football (soccer) ====
- Copa Libertadores Finals, second leg: (first leg result in parentheses)
  - Cruzeiro (Brazil) 1–2 (0–0) (Argentina) **Estudiantes**
    - Estudiantes win the Cup for the fourth time, after break of 39 years.
- Primera División Uruguaya Championship Playoff Final, second leg: (first leg result in parentheses)
  - **Nacional** 2–1 (2–1) Defensor Sporting
    - Nacional win the championship for the 42nd time.

==== Rugby league ====
- State of Origin Series:
  - Game 3 in Brisbane: Queensland 16–28 New South Wales.
    - Queensland win the series 2–1.

==== Volleyball ====
- FIVB World League:
  - Pool D:
    - Poland 1–3 Finland
      - Standings: Brazil 27 points (10 matches), Finland 20 (11).
      - Finland secured second place.

=== July 14, 2009 (Tuesday) ===
==== Baseball ====
- MLB All-Star Game in St. Louis:
  - American League 4, National League 3:
    - The AL extends its unbeaten streak in All-Star games to 13. Carl Crawford, who makes a leaping catch at the wall to steal a home run from Brad Hawpe, is named Most Valuable Player.

==== Cricket ====
- Pakistan in Sri Lanka:
  - 2nd Test in Colombo, day 3:
    - Pakistan 90 & 320 (Fawad Alam 168); Sri Lanka 240 & 171/3 (31.5 ov). **Sri Lanka win by 7 wickets, lead 3-match series 2–0**.

==== Cycling ====
- Tour de France:
  - Stage 10 – Limoges to Issoudun (193 km): (1) Mark Cavendish (GBR) (Team Columbia–HTC) 4h 46' 43" (2) Thor Hushovd (NOR) (Cervélo TestTeam) s.t. (3) Tyler Farrar (USA) (Garmin–Slipstream) s.t.
    - Cavendish gets his third stage win in this Tour.
    - General classification: (1) Rinaldo Nocentini (ITA) (Decathlon CMA CGM Team) 39h 11' 04" (2) Alberto Contador (ESP) (XDS Astana Team) +6" (3) Lance Armstrong (USA) (Astana) +8"
    - Points standing: (1) Hushovd 147 points (2) Cavendish 141 (3) José Joaquín Rojas (ESP) (Caisse d'Epargne) 97
    - King of mountains standings: (1) Egoi Martínez (ESP) (Euskaltel–Euskadi) 78 points (2) Christophe Kern (FRA) (Cofidis) 59 (3) Franco Pellizotti (ITA) (Liquigas) 55

==== Field hockey ====
- Women's Champions Trophy in Sydney, Australia:
  - Germany 0–1 Netherlands
  - Australia 2–2 China
    - Standings: Netherlands 7 points (3 matches), Argentina 6 (2), Australia 4 (3), Germany 3 (3), England 1 (2), China 1 (3).

=== July 13, 2009 (Monday) ===
==== Baseball ====
- Major League Baseball:
  - All-Star Game:
    - MLB Home Run Derby in St. Louis:
      - Final: Prince Fielder (Milwaukee Brewers) def. Nelson Cruz (Texas Rangers) 23–21
  - News: The Washington Nationals, who hold the worst record in the major leagues (22–61), fire their manager Manny Acta, and appoint the team's bench coach Jim Riggleman as manager for the remainder of the season.

==== Cricket ====
- Bangladesh in West Indies:
  - 1st Test in Kingstown, St Vincent, day 5:
    - Bangladesh 238 & 345; West Indies 307 & 181 (70.1 ov). **Bangladesh win by 95 runs, lead 2-match series 1–0**.
      - Bangladesh win their second Test in history, and the first Test overseas.
- Pakistan in Sri Lanka:
  - 2nd Test in Colombo, day 2:
    - Pakistan 90 & 178/1 (53.0 ov, Fawad Alam 102*); Sri Lanka 240. Pakistan led by 28 runs with 9 wickets remaining.

==== Football (soccer) ====
- UEFA Women's Under-19 Championship in Belarus:
  - Group A:
    - France 1–2 Germany
    - Belarus 1–4 Switzerland
  - Group B:
    - Sweden 0–3 England
    - Iceland 0–0 Norway

==== Golf ====
- LPGA commissioner Carolyn Bivens resigns under pressure and is replaced by board member Marsha Evans effective immediately.

=== July 12, 2009 (Sunday) ===
==== Auto racing ====
- Formula One:
  - German Grand Prix in Nürburg, Germany:
    - (1) Mark Webber (AUS) (Red Bull–Renault) 1:36:43.310 (2) Sebastian Vettel (GER) (Red Bull-Renault) +9.252 (3) Felipe Massa (BRA) (Ferrari) +15.906
      - Drivers' standings (after 9 of 17 races): (1) Jenson Button (GBR) (Brawn–Mercedes) 68 points (2) Vettel 47 (3) Webber 45.5
      - Constructors' standings: (1) Brawn-Mercedes 112 (2) Red Bull-Renault 92.5 (3) Toyota 34.5
- IndyCar Series:
  - Honda Indy Toronto in Toronto, Ontario:
    - (1) Dario Franchitti (GBR) (Chip Ganassi Racing) (2) Ryan Briscoe (AUS) (Team Penske) (3) Will Power (AUS) (Team Penske)
      - Drivers' standings (after 10 of 17 races): (1) Franchitti 347 points (2) Scott Dixon (NZL) (Chip Ganassi Racing) 345 (3) Briscoe 334
- V8 Supercars:
  - Dunlop Townsville 400 in Townsville, Queensland:
    - Round 12: (1) James Courtney (AUS) (Ford Falcon) (2) Jamie Whincup (AUS) (Holden Commodore) (3) Garth Tander (AUS) (Holden Commodore)
      - Standings (after 12 of 26 races): (1) Whincup 1560 points (2) Will Davison (AUS) (Holden Commodore) 1386 (3) Tander 1212

==== Basketball ====
- FIBA Under-19 World Championship in Auckland, New Zealand:
  - 7th place: Canada 82–74 France
  - 5th place: Puerto Rico 70–92 Argentina
  - 3rd place: (bronze) Croatia 87–81 Australia
  - Final: (gold) United States 88–80 (silver) Greece
    - USA win the title for the fourth time.

==== Cricket ====
- Australia in England:
  - The Ashes Series:
    - 1st Test in Cardiff, day 5:
      - England 435 & 252/9 (105.0 ov); Australia 674/6d. **Match drawn. 5-match series level 0–0**.
- Bangladesh in West Indies:
  - 1st Test in Kingstown, St Vincent, day 4:
    - Bangladesh 238 & 321/5 (Tamim Iqbal 128); West Indies 307. Bangladesh led by 252 runs with 5 wickets remaining.
- Pakistan in Sri Lanka:
  - 2nd Test in Colombo, day 1:
    - Pakistan 90; Sri Lanka 164/3 (48.0 ov). Sri Lanka led by 74 runs with 7 wickets remaining in the 1st innings.
- Kenya in Ireland:
  - 3rd ODI in Dublin:
    - Ireland 256/7 (50 ov); Kenya 240/6 (46.0/46 ov). **Ireland win by 4 runs (D/L method), win 3-match series 3–0**.
- Canada in Netherlands:
  - 2nd ODI in Amstelveen:
    - **Match abandoned without a ball bowled. Netherlands win 2-match series 1–0**

==== Cycling ====
- Tour de France:
  - Stage 9 – Saint-Gaudens to Tarbes (160 km): (1) Pierrick Fédrigo (FRA) (Team TotalEnergies) 4h 5' 31" (2) Franco Pellizotti (ITA) (Liquigas) s.t. (3) Óscar Freire (ESP) (Visma–Lease a Bike) +34"
    - General classification: (1) Rinaldo Nocentini (ITA) (Decathlon CMA CGM Team) 34h 24' 21" (2) Alberto Contador (ESP) (XDS Astana Team) +6" (3) Lance Armstrong (USA) (Astana) +8"
    - King of Mountain standings: (1) Egoi Martínez (ESP) (Euskaltel–Euskadi) 78 pts (2) Christophe Kern (FRA) (Cofidis) 59 (3) Pellizotti 55
    - Points standings: (1) Thor Hushovd (NOR) (Cervélo TestTeam) 117 pts (2) Mark Cavendish (GBR) (HTC–Highroad) 106 (3) José Joaquín Rojas (ESP) (Movistar Team) 75

==== Field hockey ====
- Women's Champions Trophy in Sydney, Australia:
  - England 1–3 Germany
  - Australia 0–1 Argentina
  - China 0–1 Netherlands
    - Standings (after 2 matches): Argentina 6 points, Netherlands 4, Australia, Germany 3, England 1, China 0.

==== Football (soccer) ====
- CONCACAF Gold Cup in United States: (teams in **bold** advance to the quarterfinals)
  - Group C in Glendale, Arizona:
    - **Panama** 4–0 Nicaragua
    - **Mexico** 2–0 **Guadeloupe**
      - Standings: Mexico 7 points, Guadeloupe 6, Panama 4, Nicaragua 0.
- Primera División Uruguaya Championship Playoff Final, first leg:
  - Defensor Sporting 1–2 Nacional

==== Golf ====
- Women's majors:
  - U.S. Women's Open in Bethlehem, Pennsylvania:
    - (1) Ji Eun-hee (KOR) 284 (E) (2) Candie Kung (TWN) 285 (+1) (3) In-Kyung Kim (KOR) & Cristie Kerr (USA) 286 (+2)
      - Ji birdies the final hole to win her first major and second LPGA Tour title.
- PGA Tour:
  - John Deere Classic in Silvis, Illinois:
    - (1) Steve Stricker (USA) 264 (−20) (2) Zach Johnson, Brett Quigley & Brandt Snedeker (all United States) 267 (−17)
      - Stricker wins his sixth PGA Tour title.
- European Tour:
  - Barclays Scottish Open in Luss, Scotland:
    - (1) Martin Kaymer (GER) 269 (−15) (2) Gonzalo Fernández-Castaño (ESP) & Raphaël Jacquelin (FRA) 271 (−13)
      - Kaymer wins two tournaments in successive weeks and his fourth career European Tour title.

==== Tennis ====
- Davis Cup:
  - World Group Quarterfinals, day 3:
    - **Czech Republic** 3–2 Argentina
      - Juan Martín del Potro (ARG) bt Tomáš Berdych (CZE) 6–4, 6–4, 6–4
      - Radek Štěpánek (CZE) bt Juan Mónaco (ARG) 7–6(3), 6–3, 6–2
        - Czech Republic reach the semifinals for the first time since 1996.
    - **Croatia** 3–2 United States
      - Marin Čilić (CRO) bt James Blake (USA) 6–3, 6–3, 4–6, 6–2
      - Bob Bryan (USA) bt Roko Karanušić (CRO) 5–7, 6–3, 7–6(4)
        - Croatia reach the semifinals for the first time since they won the Cup in 2005.
    - **Israel** 4–1 Russia
      - Igor Andreev (RUS) bt Dudi Sela (ISR) 4–3 (retired)
      - Harel Levy (ISR) bt Igor Kunitsyn (RUS) 6–4 4–6 7–6(2)
    - **Spain** 3–2 Germany
      - Philipp Kohlschreiber (GER) bt Fernando Verdasco (ESP) 6–4 6–2 1–6 2–6 8–6
      - Juan Carlos Ferrero (ESP) bt Andreas Beck (GER) 6–4, 6–4, 6–4
        - Spain, the defending champion, will host Israel in the semifinals.
- ATP World Tour:
  - Hall of Fame Tennis Championships in Newport, Rhode Island, United States:
    - Final: **Rajeev Ram (USA)** (LL) bt Sam Querrey (USA) (3) 6–7(3), 7–5, 6–3
      - Ram wins his first ATP World Tour title.
- WTA Tour:
  - GDF Suez Grand Prix in Budapest, Hungary:
    - Final: **Ágnes Szávay (HUN)** (4) bt Patty Schnyder (SUI) (1) 2–6, 6–4, 6–2
      - Szávay wins her third career WTA Tour title and becomes the first Hungarian winner of the singles title in this tournament.

==== Volleyball ====
- FIVB World League: (teams in **bold** advance to the final stage)
  - Pool A:
    - China 3–0 Netherlands
      - Standings (after 10 from 12 matches): USA 21 pts, Italy 17, Netherlands 13, China 9.
  - Pool B:
    - South Korea 1–3 France
      - Standings: Serbia 18 pts, France 17, Argentina 16, South Korea 9.
  - Pool C:
    - Bulgaria 3–0 Cuba
      - Standings: Cuba 20 pts, Russia 17, Bulgaria 15, Japan 8.
  - Pool D:
    - Venezuela 0–3 **Brazil**
      - Standings: **Brazil** 27 pts, Finland 17, Poland 11, Venezuela 5.

=== July 11, 2009 (Saturday) ===
==== Auto racing ====
- Sprint Cup Series:
  - LifeLock.com 400 in Joliet, Illinois:
    - (1) Mark Martin (Arkansas) (Chevrolet, Hendrick Motorsports) (2) Jeff Gordon (California) (Chevrolet, Hendrick Motorsports) (3) Kasey Kahne (Washington (state)) (Dodge, Richard Petty Motorsports)
      - Drivers' standings (after 19 of 26 races leading to the Chase for the Sprint Cup): (1) Tony Stewart (Indiana) 2884 points (Chevrolet, Stewart Haas Racing) (2) Gordon 2709 (3) Jimmie Johnson (California) 2672 (Chevrolet, Hendrick Motorsports)
- V8 Supercars:
  - Dunlop Townsville 400 in Townsville, Queensland:
    - Round 11: (1) Jamie Whincup (AUS) (Ford Falcon) (2) Will Davison (AUS) (Holden Commodore) (3) Garth Tander (AUS) (Holden Commodore)
      - Standings (after 11 of 26 races): (1) Whincup 1422 points (2) Will Davison 1266 (3) Tander 1083

==== Basketball ====
- Summer Universiade in Belgrade, Serbia:
  - Men:
    - Final: (gold) Serbia 73–51 (silver) Russia
    - Bronze medal match: (bronze) United States 91–80 Israel
  - Women:
    - Final: (gold) United States 83–64 (silver) Russia
    - Bronze medal match: (bronze) Australia 88–77 Czech Republic

==== Cricket ====
- Australia in England:
  - The Ashes Series:
    - 1st Test in Cardiff, day 4:
      - England 435 & 20/2 (7.0 ov); Australia 674/6d (Marcus North 125*, Brad Haddin 121). England trail by 219 runs with 8 wickets remaining.
        - Four Australian players score hundreds in one innings for the first time in the Ashes history.
- Bangladesh in West Indies:
  - 1st Test in Kingstown, St Vincent, day 3:
    - Bangladesh 238 & 26/0 (7.0 ov); West Indies 307. Bangladesh trail by 43 runs with 10 wickets remaining.
- Kenya in Ireland:
  - 2nd ODI in Dublin:
    - Kenya 175 (45.1 ov); Ireland 104/1 (21/21 ov). **Ireland win by 52 runs (D/L method), lead 3-match series 2–0**.
- Canada in Netherlands:
  - 1st ODI in Amstelveen:
    - Netherlands 237/7 (50 ov); Canada 187 (39 ov). **Netherlands win by 50 runs, lead 2-match series 1–0**.

==== Cycling ====
- Tour de France:
  - Stage 8 – Andorra la Vella to Saint-Girons (176 km): (1) Luis León Sánchez (ESP) (Movistar Team) 4h 31' 50" (2) Sandy Casar (FRA) (Groupama–FDJ United) s.t. (3) Mikel Astarloza (ESP) (Euskaltel–Euskadi) s.t.
    - General classification: (1) Rinaldo Nocentini (ITA) (Decathlon CMA CGM Team) 30h 18' 16" (2) Alberto Contador (ESP) (XDS Astana Team) +6" (3) Lance Armstrong (USA) (Astana) +8"
    - King of Mountain standings: (1) Christophe Kern (FRA) (Cofidis) 59 pts (2) Egoi Martínez (ESP) (Euskaltel–Euskadi) 54 (3) Brice Feillu (FRA) (Agritubel) 49
    - Points standings: (1) Thor Hushovd (NOR) (Cervélo TestTeam) 117 pts (2) Mark Cavendish (GBR) (HTC–Highroad) 106 (3) Gerald Ciolek (GER) (Team Milram) 66

==== Field hockey ====
- Women's Champions Trophy in Sydney, Australia:
  - Netherlands 2–2 England
  - Germany 0–2 Australia
  - Argentina 2–1 China

==== Football (soccer) ====
- CONCACAF Gold Cup in United States: (teams in **bold** advance to the quarterfinals)
  - Group B in Foxborough, Massachusetts:
    - **Haiti** 2–2 **United States**
    - **Honduras** 4–0 Grenada
      - Standings: USA 7 points, Honduras 6, Haiti 4, Grenada 0.

==== Golf ====
- Women's majors:
  - U.S. Women's Open in Bethlehem, Pennsylvania, third round:
    - Leaderboard: (1) Cristie Kerr (USA) 211(−2) (2) Eun-Hee Ji (KOR) 213(E) (3) Jean Reynolds (USA) & Teresa Lu (ROC) 215(+2)

==== Mixed martial arts ====
- UFC 100 in Las Vegas:
  - UFC Welterweight Championship bout: Georges St-Pierre (CAN) retains his title by unanimous decision over Thiago Alves (BRA).
  - UFC Heavyweight Championship unification bout: World Heavyweight Champion Brock Lesnar (USA) defeats Interim Heavyweight Champion Frank Mir (USA) by TKO in the second round.

==== Rugby league ====
- RLEF European Shield:
  - Italy 38–8 Czech Republic

==== Rugby union ====
- 2011 Rugby World Cup qualifying
  - Americas qualification playoff, second leg in Edmonton: (first leg result in parentheses)
    - Canada 41–18 (6–12) United States
      - Canada win 47–30 on aggregate, and qualify for the World Cup. USA will play against Uruguay for another World Cup berth.
  - Oceania Qualification Playoff, first leg in Apia:
    - Samoa 115–7 Papua New Guinea

==== Tennis ====
- Davis Cup:
  - World Group Quarterfinals, day 2:
    - Czech Republic 2–1 Argentina
      - Radek Štěpánek/Tomáš Berdych (CZE) bt Leonardo Mayer/José Acasuso (ARG) 6–1, 6–4, 6–3
    - Croatia 2–1 United States
      - Bob Bryan/Mike Bryan (USA) bt Lovro Zovko/Roko Karanušić (CRO) 6–3, 6–1, 6–3
    - **Israel** 3–0 Russia
      - Jonathan Erlich/Andy Ram (ISR) bt Igor Kunitsyn/Marat Safin (RUS) 6–3, 6–4, 6–7(3), 4–6, 6–4
        - Israel advance to the semifinal for the first time.
    - Spain 2–1 Germany
      - Feliciano López/Fernando Verdasco (ESP) bt Nicolas Kiefer/Mischa Zverev (GER) 6–3, 7–6(1), 6–7(6), 6–3
- WTA Tour:
  - Swedish Open in Båstad, Sweden:
    - Final: **María José Martínez Sánchez (ESP)** bt Caroline Wozniacki (DEN) 7–5, 6–4
      - Martínez Sánchez wins her second career title.

==== Volleyball ====
- FIVB World League: teams in **bold** advance to the final stage.
  - Pool A:
    - China 2–3 Netherlands
    - United States 3–1 Italy
      - Standings: USA 21 pts, Italy 17.
  - Pool B:
    - South Korea 0–3 France
    - Argentina 2–3 Serbia
      - Standings: Serbia 18 pts, Argentina 16.
  - Pool C:
    - Bulgaria 3–2 Cuba
    - Russia 1–3 Japan
      - Standings: Cuba 20 pts (9 matches), Russia 17 (10).
  - Pool D:
    - Finland 3–0 Poland
      - Standings: **Brazil** 24 pts (9 matches), Finland 17 (10).
- Summer Universiade in Belgrade, Serbia:
  - Men:
    - Final: (gold) Russia 3–0 (silver) Brazil
    - Bronze medal match: (bronze) Egypt 3–0 Czech Republic

=== July 10, 2009 (Friday) ===
==== Athletics ====
- Golden League:
  - Golden Gala in Rome, Italy: (GL indicates Golden League event, athletes in **bold** are in contention for the 1M$ jackpot)
    - Men:
      - 100 Metres (GL): (gold) Tyson Gay (USA) 9.77sec
      - 400 Metres (GL): (gold) Chris Brown (BAH) 44.81
      - 800 Metres: (gold) Alfred Kirwa Yego (KEN) 1:45.23
      - 1500 Metres: (gold) Asbel Kipruto Kiprop (KEN) 3:31.20
      - 5000 Metres (GL): (gold) **Kenenisa Bekele (ETH)** 12:56.23
      - 110 Metres Hurdles (GL): (gold) Dayron Robles (CUB) 13.17
      - 400 Metres Hurdles: (gold) Kerron Clement (USA) 48.09
      - Long Jump: (gold) Dwight Phillips (USA) 8.61m
      - Javelin Throw (GL): (gold) Andreas Thorkildsen (NOR) 87.46
    - Women:
      - 100 Metres (GL): (gold) **Kerron Stewart (JAM)** 10.75sec
      - 400 Metres (GL): (gold) **Sanya Richards (USA)** 49.46
      - 800 Metres: (gold) Maggie Vessey (USA) 2:00.13
      - 1500 Metres: (gold) Maryam Yusuf Jamal (BHR) 3:56.55
      - 3000 Metres Steeplechase: (gold) Gulnara Galkina (RUS) 9:11.58
      - 100 Metres Hurdles (GL): (gold) Dawn Harper (USA) 12.55
      - 400 Metres Hurdles: (gold) Anna Jesień (POL) 54.31
      - High Jump (GL): (gold) Antonietta Di Martino (ITA) 2.00m
      - Pole Vault (GL): (gold) **Yelena Isinbayeva (RUS)** 4.85

==== Auto racing ====
- Nationwide Series:
  - Dollar General 300 in Joliet, Illinois:
    - (1) Joey Logano (Connecticut) (Toyota, Joe Gibbs Racing) (2) Kyle Busch (Nevada) (Toyota, Joe Gibbs Racing) (3) Brian Vickers (North Carolina) (Toyota, Red Bull Racing Team)

==== Baseball ====
- Major League Baseball:
  - Jonathan Sánchez of the San Francisco Giants twirls the first no hitter of the season in defeating the San Diego Padres, 8–0 facing 28 batters, one over the minimum thanks to an eighth-inning error by Juan Uribe.

==== Cricket ====
- Australia in England:
  - The Ashes Series:
    - 1st Test in Cardiff, day 3:
      - England 435; Australia 479/5 (Simon Katich 122, Ricky Ponting 150). Australia led by 44 runs with 5 wickets remaining in the 1st innings.
- Bangladesh in West Indies:
  - 1st Test in Kingstown, St Vincent, day 2:
    - Bangladesh 238; West Indies 17/1 (7.0 ov). West Indies trail by 221 runs with 9 wickets remaining in the 1st innings.

==== Cycling ====
- Tour de France:
  - Stage 7 – Barcelona to Andorra-Arcalis (224 km): (1) Brice Feillu (FRA) (Agritubel) 6h 11' 31" (2) Christophe Kern (FRA) (Cofidis) + 5" (3) Johannes Fröhlinger (GER) (Team Milram) + 25"
    - General classification: (1) Rinaldo Nocentini (ITA) (Ag2r–La Mondiale) 25h 44' 32" (2) Alberto Contador (ESP) (Astana) + 6" (3) Lance Armstrong (USA) (Astana) + 8"
    - King of Mountain standings: (1) Feillu 49 points (2) Christophe Riblon (FRA) (Ag2r–La Mondiale) 46 (3) Kern 46
    - Points standings: (1) Mark Cavendish (GBR) (Team Columbia–HTC) 106 points (2) Thor Hushovd (NOR) (Cervélo TestTeam) 105 (3) Gerald Ciolek (GER) (Team Milram) 66

==== Football (soccer) ====
- CONCACAF Gold Cup in United States: (teams in **bold** advance to the quarterfinals)
  - Group A in Miami:
    - **Canada** 2–2 **Costa Rica**
    - El Salvador 0–1 Jamaica
      - Standings: **Canada** 7 points, **Costa Rica** 4, Jamaica, El Salvador 3.
      - Mexico also advance to the quarterfinals.
- Summer Universiade in Belgrade, Serbia:
  - Men:
    - Final: (gold) Ukraine 3–2 (silver) Italy
    - Bronze medal match: (bronze) Japan 1–0 Great Britain
  - Women:
    - Final: (gold) South Korea 4–1 (silver) Japan
    - Bronze medal match: (bronze) Great Britain 4–1 France

==== Golf ====
- Women's majors:
  - U.S. Women's Open in Bethlehem, Pennsylvania, second round:
    - Leaderboard: (1) Cristie Kerr (USA) 139 (−3) (2) Paula Creamer (USA) 140 (−2) (3) Jean Reynolds (USA) 141 (−1)

==== Tennis ====
- Davis Cup:
  - World Group Quarterfinals, day 1:
    - Czech Republic 1–1 Argentina
      - Tomáš Berdych (CZE) bt Juan Mónaco (ARG) 6–4, 2–6, 2–6, 6–3, 6–2
      - Juan Martín del Potro (ARG) bt Ivo Minář (CZE) 6–1, 6–3, 6–3
    - Croatia 2–0 United States
      - Ivo Karlović (CRO) bt James Blake (USA) 6–7(5), 4–6, 6–3, 7–6(3), 7–5
      - Marin Čilić (CRO) bt Mardy Fish (USA) 4–6, 6–3, 6–7(2), 6–1, 8–6
    - Israel 2–0 Russia
      - Harel Levy (ISR) bt Igor Andreev (RUS) 6–4, 6–2, 4–6, 6–2
      - Dudi Sela (ISR) bt Mikhail Youzhny (RUS) 3–6, 6–1, 6–0, 7–5
    - Spain 1–1 Germany
      - Fernando Verdasco (ESP) bt Andreas Beck (GER) 6–0, 3–6, 6–7(4), 6–2, 6–1
      - Philipp Kohlschreiber (GER) bt Tommy Robredo (ESP) 6–3, 6–4, 6–4

==== Volleyball ====
- FIVB World League:
  - Pool A:
    - United States 1–3 Italy
      - Standings: USA 18 points, Italy 17.
  - Pool B:
    - Argentina 3–1 Serbia
      - Standings: Serbia 16 points, Argentina 15.
  - Pool C:
    - Russia 3–0 Japan
      - Standings: Cuba 19 points (8 matches), Russia 17 (9).
  - Pool D:
    - Finland 3–1 Poland
    - Venezuela 0–3 Brazil
      - Standings: Brazil 24 points, Finland 14.
      - Brazil qualify for the final stage.
- Summer Universiade in Belgrade, Serbia:
  - Women:
    - Final: (gold) Italy 3–2 (silver) Serbia
    - Bronze medal match: (bronze) Poland 3–1 Russia

=== July 9, 2009 (Thursday) ===
==== Cricket ====
- Australia in England:
  - The Ashes Series:
    - 1st Test in Cardiff, day 2:
      - England 435; Australia 249/1 (Simon Katich 104*, Ricky Ponting 100*). Australia trail by 186 runs with 9 wickets remaining in the 1st innings.
- Bangladesh in West Indies:
  - 1st Test in Kingstown, St Vincent, day 1:
    - Bangladesh 42/0 (18.5 ov) vs West Indies
- Kenya in Ireland:
  - 1st ODI in Dublin:
    - Kenya 214/9 (50 ov); Ireland 215/7 (48.5 ov). **Ireland win by 3 wickets, lead 3-match series 1–0**.

==== Cycling ====
- Tour de France:
  - Stage 6 – Girona to Barcelona (175 km): (1) Thor Hushovd (NOR) (Cervélo TestTeam) 4h 21' 33" (2) Óscar Freire (ESP) (Rabobank) s.t. (3) José Joaquín Rojas (ESP) (Caisse d'Epargne) s.t.
    - General classification: (1) Fabian Cancellara (SUI) (Team Saxo Bank) 19h 29' 22" (2) Lance Armstrong (USA) (Astana) + 0" (3) Alberto Contador (ESP) (Astana) + 19"
    - Points standings: (1) Mark Cavendish (GBR) (Team Columbia–HTC) 106 points (2) Hushovd 105 (3) Gerald Ciolek (GER) (Team Milram) 66

==== Football (soccer) ====
- CONCACAF Gold Cup in United States: (teams in **bold** advance to the quarterfinals)
  - Group C in Houston:
    - **Guadeloupe** 2–0 Nicaragua
    - Mexico 1–1 Panama
      - Standings: **Guadeloupe** 6 points, Mexico 4, Panama 1, Nicaragua 0.
      - **Canada** and **United States** also clinch quarterfinal berths.
- Recopa Sudamericana, second leg: (first leg result in parentheses)
  - LDU Quito (Ecuador) 3–0 (1–0) (Brazil) Internacional
    - LDU Quito win 4–0 on aggregate.

==== Golf ====
- Women's majors:
  - U.S. Women's Open in Bethlehem, Pennsylvania, first round:
    - Leaderboard: (1) Na Yeon Choi (KOR) 68 (−3) (2) Cristie Kerr (USA), Lorena Ochoa (MEX) & Jean Reynolds (USA) 69 (−2)

=== July 8, 2009 (Wednesday) ===
==== Cricket ====
- Australia in England:
  - The Ashes Series:
    - 1st Test in Cardiff, day 1:
      - England 336/7 (90 overs) vs Australia
- Canada in Scotland:
  - 2nd ODI in Aberdeen:
    - Canada 250/9 (50 ov); Scotland 253/5 (47.2 ov). **Scotland win by 5 wickets. 2-match series drawn 1–1**.

==== Cycling ====
- Tour de France:
  - Stage 5 – Le Cap d'Agde to Perpignan (197 km): (1) Thomas Voeckler (FRA) (Bbox Bouygues Telecom) 4h 29' 35" (2) Mikhail Ignatiev (RUS) (Team Katusha) + 7" (3) Mark Cavendish (GBR) (Team Columbia–HTC) + 7"
    - General classification: (1) Fabian Cancellara (SWI) (Tinkoff) 15h 07' 49" (2) Lance Armstrong (USA) (XDS Astana Team) same time (3) Alberto Contador (ESP) (Astana) +19"
    - Points standing: (1) Cavendish 96 pts (2) Thor Hushovd (NOR) (Cervélo TestTeam) 70 (3) Tyler Farrar (USA) (EF Education–EasyPost) 54

==== Football (soccer) ====
- CONCACAF Gold Cup in United States:
  - Group B in Washington, D.C.:
    - Haiti 2–0 Grenada
    - Honduras 0–2 United States
      - Standings: USA 6 points, Haiti, Honduras 3, Grenada 0.
- Copa Libertadores Finals, first leg:
  - Estudiantes (Argentina) 0–0 (Brazil) Cruzeiro
- UEFA Champions League 2009–10, First qualifying round, second leg: (first leg result in parentheses)
  - Mogren (Montenegro) 4–0 (2–0) (Malta) Hibernians
    - Mogren win 6–0 on aggregate and will play against F.C. Copenhagen in the second round.
- Primera División Uruguaya Championship Playoff, semifinal third leg:
  - Defensor Sporting 0–3 Nacional

=== July 7, 2009 (Tuesday) ===
==== Cricket ====
- Pakistan in Sri Lanka:
  - 1st Test in Galle, day 4:
    - Sri Lanka 292 & 217; Pakistan 342 & 117 (44.3 ov). **Sri Lanka win by 50 runs, lead 3-match series 1–0**.
- Canada in Scotland:
  - 1st ODI in Aberdeen:
    - Scotland 286/4 (50 ov); Canada 287/4 (48.4 ov). **Canada win by 6 wickets, lead 2-match series 1–0**.

==== Cycling ====
- Tour de France:
  - Stage 4 – Montpellier (38 km TTT): (1) Astana 46' 29" (2) Garmin–Slipstream + 18" (3) Team Saxo Bank + 40"
    - General classification: (1) Fabian Cancellara (SUI) (Team Saxo Bank) 10h 38' 07" (2) Lance Armstrong (USA) (Astana) s.t. (3) Alberto Contador (ESP) (Astana) + 19"

==== Football (soccer) ====
- CONCACAF Gold Cup in United States:
  - Group A in Columbus, Ohio:
    - Jamaica 0–1 Costa Rica
    - Canada 1–0 El Salvador
      - Standings: Canada 6 points, El Salvador, Costa Rica 3, Jamaica 0.
- UEFA Champions League 2009–10, First qualifying round, second leg: (first leg result in parentheses)
  - **Sant Julià** (Andorra) 1–1 (1–1) (San Marino) Tre Fiori.
    - Sant Julià win 5–4 in penalty shootout, and will play against Levski Sofia in the second round.
- Chilean League, Apertura playoff final, second leg: (first leg result in parentheses)
  - Unión Española 0–1 (1–1) **Universidad de Chile**. Universidad win 2–1 on aggregate.
    - Universidad win the championship for the 13th time, and the first since 2004.

=== July 6, 2009 (Monday) ===
==== Cricket ====
- Pakistan in Sri Lanka:
  - 1st Test in Galle, day 3:
    - Sri Lanka 292 & 217; Pakistan 342 & 71/2 (19.0 ov). Pakistan require another 97 runs with 8 wickets remaining.
- ICC Intercontinental Cup:
  - Ireland v Kenya at Eglinton:
    - Ireland 404 and 224/7d; Kenya 331 and 245/8. **Match drawn**

==== Cycling ====
- Tour de France:
  - Stage 3 – Marseille to La Grande-Motte (196 km): (1) Mark Cavendish (GBR) (Team Columbia–HTC) 5h 01' 24" (2) Thor Hushovd (NOR) (Cervélo TestTeam) s.t. (3) Cyril Lemoine (FRA) (Skil–Shimano) s.t.
    - General classification: (1) Fabian Cancellara (SWI) (Tinkoff) 9h 50' 58" (2) Tony Martin (GER) (Team Columbia–HTC) +33" (3) Lance Armstrong (USA) (XDS Astana Team) +40"
    - Points standing: (1) (1) Cavendish 70 pts (2) Hushovd 54 (3) Samuel Dumoulin (FRA) (Cofidis) 36

=== July 5, 2009 (Sunday) ===
==== Auto racing ====
- IndyCar Series:
  - Camping World Watkins Glen Grand Prix in Watkins Glen, New York
    - (1) Justin Wilson (GBR) (Dale Coyne Racing) (2) Ryan Briscoe (AUS) (Team Penske) (3) Scott Dixon (NZL) (Chip Ganassi Racing)
      - Drivers' standings (after 9 of 17 races): (1) Dixon 313 points (2) Dario Franchitti (GBR) (Chip Ganassi Racing) 294 (3) Briscoe 294 (Franchitti second via tiebreaker)
- World Touring Car Championship:
  - Race of Portugal in Porto, Portugal:
    - Race 1: (1) Gabriele Tarquini (ITA) (SEAT León 2.0 TDI) (2) Robert Huff (GBR) (Chevrolet Cruze) (3) Yvan Muller (FRA) (SEAT León 2.0 TDI)
    - Race 2: (1) Augusto Farfus (BRA) (BMW 320si) (2) Yvan Muller (3) Rickard Rydell (SWE) (SEAT León 2.0 TDI)
      - Standings (after 14 of 24 races): (1) Yvan Muller 80 points (2) Tarquini 66 (3) Farfus 65

==== Cricket ====
- Pakistan in Sri Lanka:
  - 1st Test in Galle, day 2:
    - Sri Lanka 292 & 0/0 (1 over); Pakistan 342 (94 overs, Mohammad Yousuf 112)
- India in West Indies:
  - 4th ODI in Gros Islet, St Lucia:
    - West Indies 27/1 (7.3/49 ov) vs India. **No result. India win 4-match series 2–1.**

==== Cycling ====
- Tour de France:
  - Stage 2 – Monaco to Brignoles (182 km): (1) Mark Cavendish (GBR) (Team Columbia–HTC) 4h 30' 02" (2) Tyler Farrar (USA) (Garmin–Slipstream) same time (3) Romain Feillu (FRA) (Agritubel) s.t.
    - General classification: (1) Fabian Cancellara (SUI) (Team Saxo Bank) 4h 49' 34" (2) Alberto Contador (ESP) (Astana) + 18" (3) Bradley Wiggins (GBR) (Garmin–Slipstream) + 19" ...10 Lance Armstrong (USA) (Astana) + 40"
    - Points standing: (1) Cavendish 35 points (2) Farrar 30 (3) Feillu 26
- 2009 European Road Championships:
  - Men's road race U23 (gold) Kris Boeckmans (BEL), (silver) Jarosław Marycz (POL), (bronze) Sacha Modolo (ITA)

==== Football (soccer) ====
- 2010 FIFA World Cup Qualifying:
  - 2010 FIFA World Cup qualification (CAF) Third round, matchday 3:
    - Group C:
      - Egypt 3–0 Rwanda
        - Standings: Algeria 7 points, Egypt, Zambia 4, Rwanda 1.
- CONCACAF Gold Cup in United States:
  - Group C in Oakland, California:
    - Panama 1–2 Guadeloupe
    - Mexico 2–0 Nicaragua
- Argentine Primera División – Clausura, final matchday:
  - (2) Vélez Sarsfield 1–0 (1) Huracán
    - Final standings: **Vélez Sarsfield** 40 points, Huracán, Lanús 38 points.
    - A goal by Maximiliano Moralez in the 84th minute gives Vélez Sársfield their seventh championship, and denies Huracán a first title in 36 years.
- Primera División de Paraguay – Apertura, final matchday:
  - Standings: Cerro Porteño 46 points, Libertad 42.
    - Cerro Porteño win the championship for the 28th time.

==== Golf ====
- PGA Tour:
  - AT&T National in Bethesda, Maryland
    - Winner: Tiger Woods (USA) 267 (−13)
      - In the tournament he hosts, Woods holds off Hunter Mahan (USA) by one shot.
- European Tour:
  - Open de France in Paris, France
    - Winner: Martin Kaymer (DEU) 271 (−13) PO
      - Kaymer defeats Lee Westwood (ENG) on the first playoff hole.
- LPGA Tour:
  - Jamie Farr Owens Corning Classic in Sylvania, Ohio
    - Winner: Eunjung Yi (KOR) 266 (−18) PO
      - Yi defeats Morgan Pressel (USA) on the first playoff hole.

==== Motorcycle racing ====
- Moto GP:
  - United States motorcycle Grand Prix in Laguna Seca, California, United States:
    - (1) Dani Pedrosa (ESP) (Honda) 44:01.580 (2) Valentino Rossi (ITA) (Yamaha) +0.344 (3) Jorge Lorenzo (ESP) (Yamaha) +1.926
      - Riders' standings (after 8 of 17 races): (1) Rossi 151 points (2) Lorenzo 142 (3) Casey Stoner (AUS) (Ducati) 135
      - Manufacturers' standings: (1) Yamaha 195 (2) Ducati 135 (3) Honda 110

==== Tennis ====
- Wimbledon Championships in London, day 13: (seeding in parentheses)
  - Gentlemen's singles Final:
    - Roger Federer (SUI) [2] def. Andy Roddick (USA) [6] 5–7 7–6(6) 7–6(5) 3–6 16–14
      - Federer wins his sixth Wimbledon title and a record 15th Grand Slam tournament.
  - Mixed doubles Final:
    - Mark Knowles (BAH)/Anna-Lena Grönefeld (GER) [9] def. Leander Paes (IND)/Cara Black (ZIM) [1] 7–5 6–3
  - Boys' singles Final:
    - Andrey Kuznetsov (RUS) def. Jordan Cox (USA) 4–6 6–2 6–2
  - Girls' doubles Final:
    - Noppawan Lertcheewakarn (THA)/Sally Peers (AUS) def. Kristina Mladenovic (FRA)/Silvia Njirić (CRO) [2] 6–1 6–1
  - Boys' doubles Final:
    - Pierre-Hugues Herbert (FRA)/Kevin Krawietz (GER) def. Julien Obry (FRA)/Adrien Puget (FRA) 6–7(3) 6–2 12–10

==== Triathlon ====
- European Championships in Holten, Netherlands:
  - Men: (gold) Javier Gomez (ESP) 1:44:14 (silver) Alistair Brownlee (GBR) 1:44:41 (bronze) Alexander Brukhankov (RUS) 1:44:49
  - Women: (gold) Nicola Spirig (SUI) 1:55:42 (silver) Elizabeth May (LUX) 1:56:11 (bronze) Vanessa Fernandes (POR) 1:56:32

==== Volleyball ====
- FIVB World League:
  - Pool A:
    - Italy 3–0 Netherlands
    - China 1–3 United States
      - USA lead the group with 18 points, followed by Italy with 14.
  - Pool B:
    - France 1–3 Serbia
    - Argentina 3–0 South Korea
      - Serbia lead the group with 16 points, ahead of Argentina with 12.
  - Pool C:
    - Japan 3–2 Bulgaria
    - Russia 0–3 Cuba
      - Cuba lead the group with 19 points, ahead of Russia with 14.

=== July 4, 2009 (Saturday) ===
==== American football ====
- Former Houston Oilers/Tennessee Titans quarterback Steve McNair is found as one of two victims of a shooting murder in Nashville, Tennessee.

==== Auto racing ====
- Sprint Cup Series:
  - Coke Zero 400 in Daytona Beach, Florida:
    - (1) (Indiana) Tony Stewart (Chevrolet, Stewart Haas Racing) (2) (California) Jimmie Johnson (Chevrolet, Hendrick Motorsports) (3) (Virginia) Denny Hamlin (Toyota, Joe Gibbs Racing)
      - Drivers' standings (after 18 of 26 races leading to the Chase for the Sprint Cup): (1) Stewart 2719 points (2) (California) Jeff Gordon (Chevrolet, Hendrick Motorsports) 2539 (3) Johnson 2525

==== Basketball ====
- Mediterranean Games in Pescara, Italy:
  - Men's final: (gold) Croatia 72–60 (silver) Greece
  - Men's bronze medal game: (bronze) Turkey 88–71 Italy

==== Cricket ====
- Pakistan in Sri Lanka:
  - 1st Test in Galle, day 1:
    - Sri Lanka 292 (80.2 overs); Pakistan 15/2
- ICC Intercontinental Cup:
  - Scotland v Canada at Aberdeen:
    - Scotland 185 and 199; Canada 142 and 213. **Scotland win by 29 runs**

==== Cycling ====
- Tour de France:
  - Stage 1 – Monaco (15 km ITT): (1) Fabian Cancellara (SUI) (Team Saxo Bank) 19' 33" (2) Alberto Contador (ESP) (Astana) + 18" (3) Bradley Wiggins (GBR) (Garmin–Slipstream) + 19" ...10 Lance Armstrong (USA) (Astana) + 40"
- 2009 European Road Championships:
  - Women's road race U23 (gold) Chantal Blaak (NED), (silver) Katie Colclough (GBR), (bronze) Marianne Vos (NED)

==== Football (soccer) ====
- CONCACAF Gold Cup in United States:
  - Group B in Seattle:
    - Honduras 1–0 Haiti
    - Grenada 0–4 United States
- Chilean League, Apertura playoff final, first leg:
  - Universidad de Chile 1–1 Unión Española
- Mediterranean Games in Pescara, Italy:
  - Final: (gold) Spain 2–1 (silver) Italy
  - Bronze medal match: (bronze) Libya 0–0 France. Libya win 8–7 in penalty shootout

==== Rugby league ====
- RLEF European Shield:
  - Czech Republic 30–4 Germany
- RLEF Euro Med Challenge:
  - Catalonia 6–29 Morocco

==== Rugby union ====
- Lions tour of South Africa:
  - South Africa 9–28 British & Irish Lions in Johannesburg
    - South Africa win the Test series 2–1. The Lions win denies the Springboks a first series sweep in 118 years.
- 2011 Rugby World Cup qualifying:
  - Americas qualification playoff, first leg in Charleston, South Carolina:
    - United States 12–6 Canada
  - Oceania qualification, Nations Cup Final in Port Moresby, Papua New Guinea:
    - Papua New Guinea 29–21 Cook Islands
      - PNG advance to the Oceania Qualification Playoff against Samoa.

==== Tennis ====
- Wimbledon Championships in London, day 12: (seeding in parentheses)
  - Ladies' singles Final:
    - Serena Williams (USA) [2] def. Venus Williams (USA) [3] 7–6(3), 6–2
      - Serena wins the title for the 3rd time and her 11th Grand Slam tournament.
  - Gentlemen's doubles Final:
    - Daniel Nestor (CAN)/Nenad Zimonjić (SRB) [2] def. Bob Bryan (USA)/Mike Bryan (USA) [1] 7–6(7), 6–7(3), 7–6(3), 6–3
      - Nestor and Zimonjic win their second straight title. Nestor wins his fifth career Grand Slam title.
  - Ladies' doubles Final:
    - Serena Williams (USA)/Venus Williams (USA) [4] def. Samantha Stosur (AUS)/Rennae Stubbs (AUS) [3] 7–6(4), 6–4
      - The Williams sisters win their second straight doubles title, their fourth career Wimbledon doubles title and their ninth Grand Slam doubles title. Serena wins her second title of the day.
  - Girls' singles Final:
    - Noppawan Lertcheewakarn (THA) (4) def. Kristina Mladenovic (FRA) (1) 3–6, 6–3, 6–1

==== Volleyball ====
- FIVB World League:
  - Pool A:
    - China 3–2 United States
      - USA lead the group with 15 points, followed by Italy and Netherlands with 11.
  - Pool B:
    - Argentina 2–3 South Korea
  - Pool C:
    - Japan 1–3 Bulgaria
    - Russia 3–2 Cuba
      - Cuba lead the group with 16 points, ahead of Russia with 14.
  - Pool D:
    - Finland 3–2 Brazil
      - Finland rally from 2 sets down to hand Brazil their first loss, and keep alive their slim hopes to qualify for the final stage.
    - Poland 3–1 Venezuela
      - Brazil lead the group with 21 points, ahead of Poland and Finland with 11.

=== July 3, 2009 (Friday) ===
==== Athletics ====
- Golden League:
  - Bislett Games in Oslo, Norway: (GL indicates Golden League event, athletes in **bold** are in contention for the 1M$ jackpot)
    - Men:
      - 100 Metres (GL): (gold) Asafa Powell (JAM) 10.07sec
      - 400 Metres (GL): (gold) Renny Quow (TRI) 45.18
      - 800 Metres: (gold) Yuriy Borzakovskiy (RUS) 1:44.42
      - 1500 Metres: (gold) Collins Cheboi (KEN) 3:36.24
      - One Mile: (gold) Deresse Mekonnen (ETH) 3:48.95
      - 3000 Metres (GL): (gold) Richard Bartale (KEN) 7:50.58
      - 5000 Metres (GL): (gold) **Kenenisa Bekele (ETH)** 13:04.87
      - 110 Metres Hurdles (GL): (gold) Antwon Hicks (USA) 13.41
      - Javelin Throw (GL): (gold) **Tero Pitkämäki (FIN)** 84.63 m
    - Women:
      - 100 Metres (GL): (gold) **Kerron Stewart (JAM)** 10.99
      - 400 Metres (GL): (gold) **Sanya Richards (USA)** 49.23
      - 800 Metres: (gold) Claire Gibson (GBR) 2:01.42
      - 5000 Metres: (gold) Meseret Defar (ETH) 14:36.38
      - 3000 Metres Steeplechase: (gold) Ruth Bisibori Nyangau (KEN) 9:18.65
      - 100 Metres Hurdles (GL): (gold) **Damu Cherry (USA)** 12.68
      - High Jump (GL): (gold) Blanka Vlašić (CRO) 2.00 m
      - Pole Vault (GL): (gold) **Yelena Isinbayeva (RUS)** 4.71 m

==== Auto racing ====
- Nationwide Series:
  - Subway Jalapeño 250 in Daytona Beach, Florida
    - (1) (Kansas) Clint Bowyer (Chevrolet, Richard Childress Racing) (2) (Nevada) Kyle Busch (Toyota, Joe Gibbs Racing) (3) (Missouri) Carl Edwards (Ford, Roush Fenway Racing)

==== Cricket ====
- India in West Indies:
  - 3rd ODI in Gros Islet, St Lucia:
    - West Indies 186/7 (27/27 ov); India 159/4 (21.5/22 ov). **India win by 6 wickets (with 1 ball remaining) (D/L), lead 4-match series 2–1**.

==== Football (soccer) ====
- CONCACAF Gold Cup in United States:
  - Group A in Carson, California:
    - Canada 1–0 Jamaica
    - Costa Rica 1–2 El Salvador

==== Tennis ====
- Wimbledon Championships in London, day 11: (seeding in parentheses)
  - Gentlemen's singles, semifinals:
    - Roger Federer (SUI) (2) def. Tommy Haas (GER) (24) 7–6(3) 7–5 6–3
      - Federer advances to the final for the seventh straight year, the first ever player to do so, and will attempt to win a sixth Wimbledon title and record 15th Grand Slam tournament.
    - Andy Roddick (USA) (6) def. Andy Murray (GBR) (3) 6–4, 4–6, 7–6 (7), 7–6 (5)
      - Roddick will meet Federer in a repeat of 2004 & 2005 finals.

==== Volleyball ====
- FIVB World League:
  - Pool A:
    - Italy 3–0 Netherlands
  - Pool B:
    - France 1–3 Serbia
  - Pool D:
    - Finland 0–3 Brazil
    - Poland 3–0 Venezuela
      - Brazil win their 7th straight match and lead the group by 11 points. They can clinch a place in the final stage with another win tomorrow.

=== July 2, 2009 (Thursday) ===
==== Basketball ====
- Mediterranean Games in Pescara, Italy:
  - Women's final: (gold) Italy 70–54 (silver) Serbia
  - Women's bronze medal game: (bronze) Croatia 77–62 Greece

==== Cycling ====
- 2009 European Road Championships:
  - Men's time trial (gold) Marcel Kittel (GER), (silver) Timofey Kritskiy (RUS), (bronze) Rasmus Christian Quaade (DEN)

==== Football (soccer) ====
- Copa Libertadores Semifinals, second leg: (first leg result in parentheses)
  - Grêmio (Brazil) 2–2 (1–3) (Brazil) Cruzeiro
    - Cruseiro win 5–3 on aggregate.

==== Tennis ====
- Wimbledon Championships in London, day 10: (seeding in parentheses)
  - Ladies' singles, semifinals:
    - Venus Williams (USA) (3) def. Dinara Safina (RUS) (1) 6–1 6–0
    - Serena Williams (USA) (2) def. Elena Dementieva (RUS) (4) 6–7(4) 7–5 8–6
      - The Williams sisters will meet in a repeat of last year's final. This is their eighth match in a Grand Slam final, with Serena leading the series 5–2.

=== July 1, 2009 (Wednesday) ===
==== Cycling ====
- 2009 European Road Championships:
  - Women' s time trial (gold) Ellen van Dijk (NED), (silver) Emilia Fahlin (SWE), (bronze) Marianne Vos (NED)

==== Football (soccer) ====
- Copa Libertadores Semifinals, second leg: (first leg result in parentheses)
  - Nacional (Uruguay) 1–2 (0–1) (Argentina) **Estudiantes**
    - Estudiantes win 3–1 on aggregate.
- Copa do Brasil Final, second leg: (first leg result in parentheses):
  - Internacional 2–2 (0–2) **Corinthians**
    - Corinthians win 4–2 on aggregate.

==== Tennis ====
- Wimbledon Championships in London, day 9: (seeding in parentheses)
  - Gentlemen's singles, quarterfinals:
    - Roger Federer (SUI) [2] def. Ivo Karlović (CRO) [22] 6–3 7–5 7–6(3)
    - Andy Murray (GBR) [3] def. Juan Carlos Ferrero (ESP) 7–5 6–3 6–2
    - Tommy Haas (GER) [24] def. Novak Djokovic (SRB) [4] 7–5 7–6(6) 4–6 6–3
    - Andy Roddick (USA) [6] def. Lleyton Hewitt (AUS) 6–3 6–7(10) 7–6(1) 4–6 6–4
