= Canadian cricket team in the Netherlands in 2009 =

	Canada	Netherlands
- Dates: 11 July – 18 July 2009
Captains	Ashish Bagai	Jeroen Smits

One Day International series
- Results: Netherlands won the 2-match series 1–0
Most runs	Rizwan Cheema 94	Alexei Kervezee 75
Most wickets	Zameer Zahir 2	Edgar Schiferli 4

The Canadian cricket team toured the Netherlands in 2009. They played two One Day Internationals and an Intercontinental Cup match against the Netherlands.

== Intercontinental Cup match ==
15–18 July
Scorecard

Canada	v	Netherlands
177 all out (65.4 overs); S Jyoti 37 (70); DLS van Bunge 3/11 (4.4 overs); PW Borren 3/37 (16 overs)		229 all out (81.3 overs); NA Statham 57 (137); S Jyoti 3/59 (14 overs)
419/9 dec (100 overs); S Dhaniram 144 (178); BA Westdijk 4/85 (17 overs)		233/8 (103 overs); DLS van Bunge 98* (294); U Bhatti 4/32 (18 overs)

Match Drawn
Hazelaarweg, Rotterdam, Netherlands
Umpires: NG Bagh (DEN), BG Jerling (RSA)

== ODI series ==
=== 1st ODI ===
11 July
Scorecard

Netherlands; 237/7 (50 overs)	v	Canada; 187 (39 overs)
Alexei Kervezee 75 (111); Zameer Zahir 2/23 (4 overs)		Rizwan Cheema 94 (69); Edgar Schiferli 4/44 (10 overs)

Netherlands won by 50 runs
VRA Cricket Ground, Amstelveen, Netherlands
Umpires: NG Bagh (DEN), BG Jerling (RSA)

=== 2nd ODI ===
12 July
Scorecard

Netherlands	v	Canada

Match abandoned
VRA Cricket Ground, Amstelveen, Netherlands
Umpires: NG Bagh (DEN), BG Jerling (RSA)

- Match abandoned due to rain
