= Abdur Rauf (cricketer) =

Pakistani cricketer (born 1978)

Personal information
- Full name: Abdur Rauf Khan
- Born: 9 December 1978 (age 47); Okara District, Punjab, Pakistan
- Height: 6 ft 4 in (193 cm)
- Batting: Right-handed
- Bowling: Right-arm Fast-medium
- Role: Bowler

International information
- National side: Pakistan (2008–2009)
- Test debut (cap 193): 4 July 2009 v Sri Lanka
- Last Test: 26 December 2009 v Australia
- ODI debut (cap 165): 2 February 2008 v Zimbabwe
- Last ODI: 12 November 2008 v West Indies
- Only T20I (cap 27): 12 October 2008 v Zimbabwe

Domestic team information
- Years: Team
- 1999/2000: Lahore
- 2001/02: Sui Northern Gas Pipelines Ltd
- 2002/03: Pakistan Customs
- 2003/04–2004/05: Allied Bank Limited
- 2003/04–2008/09: Multan
- 2005/06–2006/07: Khan Research Laboratories
- 2007/08–2008/09: Baluchistan

Career statistics
Competition	Test	ODI	FC	LA
Matches	3	4	136	87
Runs scored	52	0	2,923	585
Batting average	8.66	–	15.71	12.44
100s/50s	0/0	0/0	0/10	0/3
Top score	31	0	98	91
Balls bowled	450	214	26,356	4,047
Wickets	6	8	639	84
Bowling average	46.33	26.50	24.12	42.42
5 wickets in innings	0	0	52	0
10 wickets in match	0	0	10	0
Best bowling	2/59	3/24	8/40	4/47
Catches/stumpings	0/–	2/–	56/–	17/–
- Source: CricketArchive, 31 November 2013

Abdur Rauf Khan (born 9 December 1978) is a Pakistani former cricketer who played for the Pakistani national cricket team in 2008 and 2009. A right-arm fast-medium bowler, Khan made his first-class debut in October 1999.

He joined the national squad for series against South Africa and Bangladesh in 2002/03 but did play an international in either. He has since toured India with the Pakistan A team. He made his ODI debut against Zimbabwe in the 2007–08 season but played only one match in the series. He came over to England in 2000 and played in the Cambridgeshire Premier League for Wisbech Town Cricket Club taking over 50 wickets. In 2006 he featured as overseas player for Herefordshire club Brockhampton, taking 56 wickets and scoring over 500 runs.

In June 2009 following consistent performances in domestic cricket Abdur Rauf was chosen in the 15-man Pakistani squad to tour Sri Lanka at the end of the month. He made his debut in the full Pakistani Test team for the Test Match against Sri Lanka played at Galle from 4–8 July 2009. He got his first wicket which was a big one of Mahela Jayawardene and finished with 3 wickets in the match. His first Test match innings was 31 as a nightwatchman. After a decent performance he was retained for the second Test starting on 12 July. He got a pair twice trapped lbw by Nuwan Kulasekara as Sri Lanka won the series. He played in the Boxing Day Test at the MCG but only picked up 1 wicket and 8 runs as Australia won. He also dropped Shane Watson when the Australian batsman was on 99, allowing him to run through to complete his maiden Test century. He was dropped for the next match.
