= Canadian cricket team in Scotland in 2009 =

	Canada	Scotland
- Dates: 2 July – 8 July 2009
Captains	Ashish Bagai	Gavin Hamilton

One Day International series
- Results: 2-match series drawn 1–1
Most runs	Ashish Bagai 123	Gavin Hamilton 178
Most wickets	Khurram Chohan 3	Gordon Drummond 5

The Canadian cricket team toured Scotland in 2009. They played two One Day Internationals and an Intercontinental Cup match against Scotland.

== Intercontinental Cup Match ==
2–5 July
(scorecard)

Scotland	v	Canada
185 all out (62.4 overs); Gordon Drummond 52 (97); Khurram Chohan 6/23 (13.4 overs)		142 all out (40.1 overs); Rizwan Cheema 35 (40); Calum MacLeod 4/66 (19.1 overs)
199 all out (75.2 overs); Jan Stander 64 (128); Rizwan Cheema 3/39 (13 overs)		213 all out (78.3 overs); Sandeep Jyoti 47 (130); Richie Berrington 2/20 (7 overs)

Scotland won by 29 runs
Mannofield Park, Aberdeen, Scotland
Umpires: Enamul Haque (BAN) & Brian Jerling (SA)

== ODI series ==
=== 1st ODI ===
7 July
(scorecard)

Scotland; 286/4 (50 overs)	v	Canada; 287/4 (48.4 overs)
Gavin Hamilton 119 (152); Khurram Chohan 2/56 (10 overs)		Sandeep Jyoti 117 (122); Jan Stander 2/62 (8 overs)

Canada won by 6 wickets.
Mannofield Park, Aberdeen, Scotland
Umpires: Enamul Haque (BAN) & Brian Jerling (RSA)

=== 2nd ODI ===
8 July
(scorecard)

Canada; 250/9 (50 overs)	v	Scotland; 253/5 (47.2 overs)
Sunil Dhaniram 92 (88); Gordon Drummond 4/41 (9 overs)		Neil McCallum 79* (67); Harvir Baidwan 2/25 (5 overs)

Scotland won by 5 wickets
Mannofield Park, Aberdeen, Scotland
Umpires: Enamul Haque (BAN) & Brian Jerling (RSA)
