= Kenyan cricket team in Ireland in 2009 =

	Kenya	Ireland
- Dates: July 3 – July 12, 2009
Captains	Morris Ouma	Kyle McCallan

One Day International series
- Results: Ireland won the 3-match series 3–0
Most runs	Collins Obuya 126	William Porterfield 145
Most wickets	Thomas Odoyo 6	Kyle McCallan 7

The Kenyan cricket team toured Ireland in 2009. They played three One Day Internationals and an Intercontinental Cup match against Ireland.

== Intercontinental Cup match ==
3 July - 6 July
(scorecard)

Ireland	v	Kenya
404 all out (111.3 overs); Paul Stirling 100 (181); Steve Tikolo 6/80 (24.3 overs)		331 all out (114 overs); Jimmy Kamande 73 (116); Regan West 4/94 (38 overs)
224/7 (dec.) (65 overs); Andrew White 59* (79); Jimmy Kamande 2/18 (5 overs)		245/8 (70 overs); Collins Obuya 84 (95); Andrew White 2/6 (5 overs)

Match Draw
Woodvale Road, Eglinton, Ireland
Umpires: Paul Baldwin (GER) & Rudi Koertzen (SA)

== ODI series ==
=== 1st ODI ===
9 July
Scorecard

Kenya; 214/9 (50 overs)	v	Ireland; 215/7 (48.5 overs)
Kennedy Otieno 78 (115); Kyle McCallan 4/30 (10 overs)		William Porterfield 81 (111); Thomas Odoyo 4/33 (10 overs)

Ireland won by 3 wickets
Clontarf Cricket Club Ground, Dublin, Ireland
Umpires: PK Baldwin (GER), RE Koetzen (RSA)

=== 2nd ODI ===
11 July
Scorecard

Kenya; 175 (45.2 overs)	v	Ireland; 104/1 (21 overs)
Alex Obanda 59 (78); Boyd Rankin 3/40 (9 overs)		Gary Wilson 51 n.o. (62); Steve Tikolo 1/21 (3 overs)

Ireland won by 52 runs (D/L)
Clontarf Cricket Club Ground, Dublin, Ireland
Umpires: PK Baldwin (GER), RE Koetzen (RSA)

- Rain reduced Ireland's innings to 21 overs. Revised target is 53 runs in 21 overs.

=== 3rd ODI ===
12 July
Scorecard

Ireland; 256/7 (50 overs)	v	Kenya; 240/6 (46 overs)
Paul Stirling 84 (92); Thomas Odoyo 2/53 (10 overs)		Collins Obuya 78* (69); Andrew White 2/32 (8 overs)

Ireland won by 4 runs (D/L)
Clontarf Cricket Club Ground, Dublin, Ireland
Umpires: Paul Baldwin (Germany) and Rudi Koertzen (RSA)

- Rain reduced Kenya's innings to 46 overs. Revised target is 245 runs in 46 overs.
