= Zameer Zahir =

Sri Lankan cricketer (born 1973)

Zameer Zaheer
Personal information
- Full name: Mohamed Zameer Zahir
- Born: 22 October 1973 (age 53); Kandy, Sri Lanka
- Batting: Right-handed
- Bowling: Legbreak
- Role: Bowler

International information
- National side: Canada
- Only ODI (cap 65): July 11 2009 v Netherlands

Career statistics
Competition	ODI	First-class
Matches	1	4
Runs scored	3	75
Batting average	–	10.71
100s/50s	0/0	0/1
Top score	3*	57
Balls bowled	30	468
Wickets	2	8
Bowling average	17.50	35.00
5 wickets in innings	0	0
10 wickets in match	0	0
Best bowling	2/35	2/31
Catches/stumpings	0/–	1/–
- Source: ESPNcricinfo, 27 April 2023

Zameer Zahir (born 22 October 1973) is a Sri Lankan-born former cricketer who played international cricket for Canada. He played a single ODI for Canada in 2009. He also played first-class cricket for Colombo Cricket Club.
