= Pakistani cricket team in Sri Lanka in 2009 =

Pakistan in Sri Lanka in 2009
	Pakistan	Sri Lanka
- Dates: 29 June 2009 – 12 August 2009
Captains	Younis Khan	Kumar Sangakkara

Test series
- Result: Sri Lanka won the 3-match series 2–0
Most runs	Shoaib Malik (262)	Kumar Sangakkara (331)
Most wickets	Saeed Ajmal (14)	Nuwan Kulasekara (17)
- Player of the series: Nuwan Kulasekara

One Day International series
- Results: Sri Lanka won the 5-match series 3–2
Most runs	Younis Khan (244)	Mahela Jayawardene (218)
Most wickets	Mohammad Aamer (9)	Thilan Thushara (9)
- Player of the series: Thilan Thushara

Twenty20 International series
- Results: Pakistan won the 1-match series 1–0

The Pakistan cricket team toured Sri Lanka from June to August 2009. The team played three Test matches, five One Day Internationals, and one Twenty20 International against Sri Lanka. The tour was the return tour of the Sri Lankan cricket team in Pakistan in 2008–09, where during the second test the match was abandoned due to a terrorist attack on the Sri Lankan cricket team which injured seven players, three staff and killed six Pakistani policemen and two civilians.

Pakistan played a first-class game against Sri Lanka Cricket XI which was drawn. They will play a List A game. The tour continued from 29 June 2009 to 12 August 2009.

== Build up ==
The series came just two weeks after Pakistan defeated Sri Lanka in ICC world T20 cup final. The Pakistani coach Intikhab Alam was satisfied by the security being provided by the Sri Lankan government, but was concerned about his team shift from T20 cricket to Test cricket. He said,

"The key to winning the series against a strong Sri Lankan team will be our ability to adjust to demanding Test match cricket in hot and humid weather. We can’t afford to look back. Winning the Twenty20 title will mean little when the first ball is bowled in the Test series. It’s a different ball game."

Pakistan has never lost a series in Sri Lanka, winning past three, and drawing two. The Pakistani side has been boosted by return of Mohammad Yousuf and Abdul Razzaq.

From the 19 Test matches played between Pakistan and Sri Lanka in last five years, Pakistan have won 13, lost 2 and Drawn 4.

Kumar Sangakkara, for whom this is the first Test series as a captain, brushing aside the effects of Lahore attacks and loss to Pakistan in ICC T20 worldcup, said that;

"Lahore is not on our minds, the team has done a really great job mentally getting over it, it was heartbreaking to lose the Twenty20 final but we had a great tournament. I am proud of the way the team played in England and I am confident we will do as well in the Test matches."

== Test Squads ==
Test squads
Pakistan	Sri Lanka
Younis Khan (C)	Kumar Sangakkara (C) (wk)
Salman Butt	Tillakaratne Dilshan (wk)
Khurram Manzoor	Mahela Jayawardene
Mohammad Yousuf	Chamara Kapugedera
Misbah-ul-Haq	Nuwan Kulasekara
Shoaib Malik	Suranga Lakmal
Kamran Akmal (wk)	Angelo Mathews
Umar Gul	Ajantha Mendis
Saeed Ajmal	Muttiah Muralitharan
Mohammad Aamer	Tharanga Paranavitana
Danish Kaneria	Dammika Prasad
Abdul Razzaq	Thilan Samaraweera
Abdur Rauf	Kaushal Silva (wk)
Fawad Alam	Thilan Thushara
Faisal Iqbal	Malinda Warnapura
	Chaminda Vaas

=== Sri Lanka Cricket XI for pre-series matches ===
1. Thilina Kandamby (C)
2. Gihan Rupasinghe
3. Kaushal Silva
4. Farveez Maharoof
5. Chamara Kapugedera
6. Nuwan Pradeep
7. Tharanga Paranavitana
8. Muthumudalige Pushpakumara
9. Dilhara Fernando
10. Suraj Mohamed
11. Milinda Siriwardana
12. Upul Tharanga
13. Lahiru Thirimanne

== Test series ==
The test series consisted of three Test matches at Galle International Stadium in Galle, Paikiasothy Saravanamuttu Stadium in Colombo and Sinhalese Sports Club Ground also in Colombo.

=== 1st Test ===
Muttiah Muralitharan was ruled out for First Test after injuring his knee during fielding practice. He was replaced in the side for the first test by Rangana Herath.

4 – 8 July
Scorecard

Sri Lanka	v	Pakistan
292 (80.2 overs); Tharanga Paranavitana 72 (125); Mohammad Aamer 3/74 (19 overs)		342 (94 overs); Mohammad Yousuf 112 (186); Nuwan Kulasekara 4/71 (24 overs)
217 (56.2 overs); Tharanga Paranavitana 49 (58); Mohammad Aamer 3/38 (11 overs)		117 (44.3 overs); Salman Butt 28 (53); Rangana Herath 4/15 (11.3 overs)

Sri Lanka won by 50 runs
Galle International Stadium, Galle
Umpires: Ian Gould (ENG) & Daryl Harper (AUS)
Player of the match: Rangana Herath

- Pakistan won the toss and elected to field
- Mohammad Amir(Pak) made his test debut.

=== 2nd Test ===
12 – 16 July
Scorecard

Pakistan	v	Sri Lanka
90 (36 overs); Shoaib Malik 39* (88); Nuwan Kulasekara 4/21 (9 overs)		240 (80 overs); Kumar Sangakkara 87 (150); Umar Gul 4/43 (18 overs)
320 (96.4 overs); Fawad Alam 168 (259); Rangana Herath 5/99 (35 overs)		171/3 (31.5 overs); Malinda Warnapura 54 (56); Shoaib Malik 1/13 (1.5 overs); Abdur Rauf 1/13 (4 overs)

Sri Lanka won by 7 wickets
Paikiasothy Saravanamuttu Stadium, Colombo
Umpires: Daryl Harper (AUS) & Simon Taufel (AUS)
Player of the match: Fawad Alam (PAK) and Nuwan Kulasekara (SRI)

- Pakistan won the toss and elected to bat
- Fawad Alam(Pak) made his test debut.

=== 3rd Test ===
20 – 24 July
Scorecard

Pakistan	v	Sri Lanka
299 (89.4 overs); Khurram Manzoor 93 (263); Thilan Thushara 5/83 (20.4 overs)		233 (68.3 overs); Mahela Jayawardene 79 (199); Danish Kaneria 5/62 (20.3 overs)
425/9d (123 overs); Shoaib Malik 134 (372); Rangana Herath 5/157 (46 overs)		391/4 (134 overs); Kumar Sangakkara 130* (303); Danish Kaneria 2/114 (36 overs)

Match drawn
Sinhalese Sports Club Ground, Colombo
Umpires: Ian Gould (ENG) & Simon Taufel (AUS)
Player of the match: Kumar Sangakkara

- Sri Lanka won the toss and elected to field
- Chaminda Vaas(Sri Lanka) played his last Test match

== ODI series ==
There was five ODIs and one T20 International, played between 30 July and 9 August. They were played at the Rangiri Dambulla International Stadium in Dambulla and R Premadasa Stadium in Colombo.

=== 1st ODI ===
30 July 2009
(scorecard)

Sri Lanka; 232/9 (50 overs)	v	Pakistan; 196 (44.4 overs)
Angelo Mathews 43 (50); Mohammad Amir 3/45 (10 overs)		Umar Gul 33 (21); Thilan Thushara 3/29 (8 overs)

Sri Lanka won by 36 runs
Rangiri Dambulla International Stadium, Dambulla
Umpires: Steve Davis (AUS) & Asoka de Silva (SRI)
Player of the match: Muttiah Muralitharan (SRI)

- Pakistan won the toss and elected to field
- Mohammad Amir(Pak) made his ODI debut.

=== 2nd ODI ===
1 August 2009
(scorecard)

Pakistan; 168 (47 overs)	v	Sri Lanka; 169/4 (43.4 overs)
Mohammad Amir 24* (32); Thilan Thushara 3/33 (9 overs)		Chamara Kapugedera 67* (97); Mohammad Amir 1/35 (9.4 overs)

Sri Lanka won by 6 wickets
Rangiri Dambulla International Stadium, Dambulla
Umpires: Steve Davis (AUS) & Kumar Dharmasena (SRI)
Player of the match: Chamara Kapugedera (SRI)

- Sri Lanka won the toss and elected to field.
- Umar Akmal(Pak) made his ODI debut.

=== 3rd ODI ===
3 August 2009
(scorecard)

Pakistan; 288/8 (50 overs)	v	Sri Lanka; 289/4 (46.3 overs)
Umar Akmal 66 (65); Angelo Mathews 2/41 (10 overs)		Mahela Jayawardene 123 (108); Saeed Ajmal 2/54 (9 overs)

Sri Lanka won by 6 wickets
Rangiri Dambulla International Stadium, Dambulla
Umpires: Steve Davis (AUS) & Asoka de Silva (SRI)
Player of the match: Mahela Jayawardene (SRI)

- Sri Lanka won the toss and elected to field.

=== 4th ODI ===
7 August 2009
scorecard

Pakistan; 321/5 (50 overs)	v	Sri Lanka; 175 (36.1 overs)
Umar Akmal 102* (72); Malinga Bandara 2/44 (10 overs)		Upul Tharanga 80 (89); Rao Iftikhar Anjum 5/30 (8.1 overs)

Pakistan won by 146 runs
R Premadasa Stadium, Colombo
Umpires: Steve Davis (AUS) & Gamini Silva (SRI)
Player of the match: Umar Akmal (PAK)

- Pakistan won the toss and elected to bat.

=== 5th ODI ===
9 August 2009
(scorecard)

Pakistan; 279/8 (50 overs)	v	Sri Lanka; 147 (34.2 overs)
Misbah-ul-Haq 73 (82); Mohammad Amir 4/28 (9 overs)		Thilina Kandamby 42 (71); Nuwan Kulasekara 3/46 (10 overs)

Pakistan won by 132 runs
R Premadasa Stadium, Colombo
Umpires: Steve Davis (AUS) & Gamini Silva (IND)
Player of the match: Naved-ul-Hasan (PAK)

- Pakistan won the toss and elected to bat.

== Only Twenty20 ==
12 August 2009
scorecard

Pakistan; 172/5 (20 overs)	v	Sri Lanka; 120 (18.1 overs)
Shahid Afridi 50 (37); Thilan Thushara 2/37 (4 overs)		Kumar Sangakkara 38 (31); Saeed Ajmal 3/18 (4 overs)

Pakistan won by 52 runs
R Premadasa Stadium, Colombo
Umpires: Asoka de Silva (SRI) and Tyron Wijewardene (SRI)
Player of the match: Shahid Afridi (PAK)

- Pakistan won the toss and elected to bat.

== Tour matches ==
=== First class:Sri Lanka Cricket XI v Pakistanis ===
29 June – 1 July
(scorecard)

Sri Lanka Cricket XI	v	Pakistan
345/5d (89.4 overs); Lahiru Thirimanne 116 (171); Abdur Rauf 2/62 (15.4 overs)		400/8d (90 overs); Fawad Alam 83* (114); Khurram Manzoor 83 (136); Suraj Randiv 4/120 (30 overs)
137/2d (37.4 overs); Tharanga Paranavitana 48 (102); Danish Kaneria 1/37 (9.4 overs)		54/4 (18 overs); Salman Butt 22 (28); Chamara Kapugedera 2/6 (5 overs)

Match drawn
Nondescripts Cricket Club Ground, Colombo
Umpires: LE Hannibal (SL) and RD Kottahachchi(SL)

- Players per side 13 (11 batting, 11 fielding)

=== List A:Sri Lanka A v Pakistanis ===
27 July 2009
Scorecard

Sri Lanka A 348/6 (50 overs)	v	Pakistan; 333 (50 overs)
Mahela Udawatte 161 (135); Abdul Razzaq 4/70 (9 overs)		Umar Akmal 103 (76); Dilhara Fernando 3/50 (9 overs)

Sri Lanka A won by 15 runs
Welagedara Stadium, Kurunegala
Umpires: Dilshan de Silva (SL) & Ruchira Palliyaguru (SL)

== Security ==
Tight security has been arranged for visiting team, with Sri Lankan government deploying more than 100 Special Task Force personnel for VIP protection. Stringent measures have been put in place, particularly focusing on security along the routes from hotels to match venues.

Fireworks, musical bands, glass bottles, tin cans, sharp objects, laser pointers and mirrors are banned in the Stadiums. Except national flags of Sri Lanka and Pakistan, no banners, posters and discriminating slogans will be allowed in the ground.

The series has started just a month after the Sri Lankan Civil war came to an end.

== Match fixing ==
Pakistan team management complained with hotel management in Colombo over the presence of suspected Indian makers. Express, a mainstream Urdu daily, claimed in a report that some unidentified Indian bookies approached several Pakistani players during the second and third Tests against Sri Lanka in Colombo. Yawar Saeed, the Pakistan team manager said that the incidents did happen but the team management took appropriate steps to erase any chances of further contacts between the players and the bookies.

== Media coverage ==
Television Networks

- Ten Sports (Live) – India, Pakistan, Malaysia, Indonesia and Middle East
- Prime Sports (Live) – Middle East
- Zee Cinema (Live) – United Kingdom
- Zee Muzic (highlights) – United Kingdom
- SuperSport (Live) – South Africa, Kenya, Zimbabwe and rest of Africa
- Direct TV (Live) – USA
