= Korfball at the 2009 World Games =

2009 World Games - Korfball
| Host | (Taiwan) Kaohsiung |
| Dates | July 17–21, 2009 |
| Teams | 8 |
Podium
| Champions | Netherlands |
| Runners-up | Belgium |
| Third place | Chinese Taipei |
| Fourth place | Russia |

The Korfball events at the World Games 2009 took place at the NKNU Gymnasium, a sport arena in Kaohsiung, from Friday, July 17 to Tuesday, July 21, 2009.

== Teams ==
Pool A
| Australia |
| Czech Republic |
| Netherlands |
| Russia |

Pool B
| Belgium |
| Chinese Taipei |
| Great Britain |
| Portugal |

== Pool matches ==
Legend

| Pts = Points; P = Played games W = Win; L = Lost | F = Korfs favour A = Korfs against D = Difference korfs (KF-KA); GG = Match won by golden goal |

| POOL A | Pts | P | W | L | F | A | D |
|---|---|---|---|---|---|---|---|
| Netherlands | 9 | 3 | 3 | 0 | 106 | 28 | +78 |
| Russia | 6 | 3 | 2 | 1 | 45 | 62 | -17 |
| Czech Republic | 3 | 3 | 1 | 2 | 46 | 69 | -23 |
| Australia | 0 | 3 | 0 | 3 | 38 | 76 | -38 |

| July 17 | Czech Republic | 21-16 | Australia | Details |
| July 17 | Netherlands | 35-8 | Russia | Details |
| July 18 | Russia | 18-12 | Australia | Details |
| July 18 | Czech Republic | 10-34 | Netherlands | Details |
| July 19 | Netherlands | 37-10 | Australia | Details |
| July 19 | Czech Republic | 15-19 | Russia | Details |

| POOL B | Pts | P | W | L | F | A | D |
|---|---|---|---|---|---|---|---|
| Belgium | 9 | 3 | 3 | 0 | 81 | 47 | +34 |
| Chinese Taipei | 6 | 3 | 2 | 1 | 59 | 63 | -4 |
| Portugal | 3 | 3 | 1 | 2 | 52 | 63 | -11 |
| Great Britain | 0 | 3 | 0 | 3 | 38 | 57 | -19 |

| July 17 | Belgium | 25-13 | Great Britain | Details |
| July 17 | Chinese Taipei | 26-19 | Portugal | Details |
| July 18 | Great Britain | 11-15 | Portugal | Details |
| July 18 | Chinese Taipei | 16-30 | Belgium | Details |
| July 19 | Belgium | 26-18 | Portugal | Details |
| July 19 | Chinese Taipei | 17-14 | Great Britain | Details |

== Semifinals ==
5th-8th places

July 20, 2009 - 13:45
| July 20, 2009 - 13:45 | Portugal | 22-10 | Australia | Details |

July 20, 2009 - 15:35
| July 20, 2009 - 15:35 | Great Britain | 12-13 | Czech Republic | Details |

Semifinals

July 20, 2009 - 17:25
| July 20, 2009 - 17:25 | Belgium | 24-8 | Russia | Details |

July 20, 2009 - 19:15
| July 20, 2009 - 19:15 | Chinese Taipei | 13-29 | Netherlands | Details |

== Finals ==
July 21, 2009 - 12:30
| July 21, 2009 - 12:30 | Australia | 18-31 | Great Britain | Details |

July 21, 2009 - 14:30
| July 21, 2009 - 14:30 | Portugal | 18-19 | Czech Republic | Details |

July 21, 2009 - 16:30
| July 21, 2009 - 16:30 | Russia | 18-25 | Chinese Taipei | Details |

July 21, 2009 - 18:30
| July 21, 2009 - 18:30 | Belgium | 20-25 | Netherlands | Details |

Semi-finals
Belgium | 24
Russia | 8
Chinese Taipei | 13
Netherlands | 29

Final
Belgium | 20
Netherlands | 25
Third place
Russia | 18
Chinese Taipei | 25

Champions
Netherlands

== Final standings ==
| Rank | Team |
|---|---|
| Gold medal | Netherlands |
| Silver medal | Belgium |
| Bronze medal | Chinese Taipei |
| 4. | Russia |
| 5. | Czech Republic |
| 6. | Portugal |
| 7. | Great Britain |
| 8. | Australia |
