= Sandeep Jyoti =

Indian-born Canadian cricketer (born 1973)

Personal information
- Born: 14 December 1973 (age 52); Shimla, India
- Batting: Right-handed
- Bowling: Right-arm offbreak

International information
- National side: Canada (2003-2010)
- ODI debut (cap 39): 21 August 2006 v Bermuda
- Last ODI: 18 February 2010 v Afghanistan
- T20I debut (cap 21): 12 October 2008 v Sri Lanka
- Last T20I: 13 October 2008 v Zimbabwe

Career statistics
Competition	ODI	FC
Matches	14	8
Runs scored	264	328
Batting average	22.00	21.86
100s/50s	1/0	0/0
Top score	117	47
Balls bowled	120	732
Wickets	1	11
Bowling average	90.00	41.27
5 wickets in innings	0	0
10 wickets in match	0	0
Best bowling	1/26	3/59
Catches/stumpings	4/-	4/-
- Source: ESPNcricinfo, 29 April 2020

Sandeep Jyoti (born 14 December 1973) is an Indian-born Canadian former cricketer.

Jyoti was born in Shimla, India, and migrated to Canada when he was fourteen years old. Upon arrival in Canada, Sandeep joined the Mississauga Ramblers Cricket Club in Mississauga, Ontario. Here he learned his cricket and is still currently playing for the club where he coaches as well. Sandeep made his debut for the Canadian national cricket team in 2003 when he participated in the Red Stripe Bowl in Jamaica.

In 2006, he played for the national team in the America's cup tournament. Sandeep had a good Americas Cup where he had some great opening partnerships with John Davison. Sandeep also had a couple of not out innings vital to Canadian victories.

Sandeep was an opening batsman and a right-arm off-break bowler. His highest batting score for Canada is 117.
