= Diving at the 2008 Summer Olympics – Qualification =

== Qualification Criteria ==
An NOC may qualify a maximum of two divers in each individual event, and one team in each synchronized event. Entry places will be allocated based on results at the FINA World Championships in 2007, and the FINA Diving World Cup in 2008. The divers only earn qualification spots for their country, not the divers themselves.

== Qualification summary ==
Nation	Synchronized Diving				Individual Diving				Total	
Nation	Men's 3m	Men's 10m	Women's 3m	Women's 10m	Men's 3m	Men's 10m	Women's 3m	Women's 10m	Quotas	Athletes
Australia	1	1	1	1	2	2	2	2	12	9
Austria					1		1	1	3	3
Belarus					1	2	1		4	4
Brazil					1	2		1	4	4
Canada	1			1	2	2	2	2	10	10
China	1	1	1	1	2	2	2	2	12	10
Colombia		1			1	1	1		4	3
Cuba		1			2	2			5	5
Finland					1				1	1
France								2	2	2
Germany	1	1	1	1	2	2	2	2	12	14
Great Britain	1	1	1	1	1	2	1	2	10	10
Greece								1	1	1
Hungary							2		2	2
Italy			1		2	1	2	2	8	8
Japan					1			1	2	2
Malaysia						1	2	1	4	4
Mexico				1	1	2	2	2	8	7
North Korea				1		1		2	4	3
Philippines						1	1		2	2
Romania						1		1	2	2
Russia	1	1	1		2	2	2	1	10	10
South Africa							1		1	1
South Korea					1				1	1
Spain					1		1		2	2
Sweden							1	1	2	2
Ukraine	1		1		2	2	2	1	9	9
United States	1	1	1	1	2	2	2	2	12	12
Venezuela					1				1	1
Total: 29 NOCs	8	8	8	8	29	30	30	29	150	136

== Men's 3m Synchronized Diving ==
Competition	Date	Venue	Qualifiers
FINA World Championships	Mar 17 - Apr 1, 2007	(Australia) Melbourne	Canada; Germany; United States
FINA Diving World Cup	February 19–25, 2008	(China) Beijing	Russia; Great Britain; Ukraine; Australia
Host nation			China
TOTAL			8

== Men's 10m Synchronized Diving ==
Competition	Date	Venue	Qualifiers
FINA World Championships	Mar 17 - Apr 1, 2007	(Australia) Melbourne	Russia; United States; Cuba
FINA Diving World Cup	February 19–25, 2008	(China) Beijing	Germany; Great Britain; Australia; Colombia
Host nation			China
TOTAL			8

== Women's 3m Synchronized Diving ==
Competition	Date	Venue	Qualifiers
FINA World Championships	Mar 17 - Apr 1, 2007	(Australia) Melbourne	Germany; Australia; Ukraine
FINA Diving World Cup	February 19–25, 2008	(China) Beijing	Russia; United States; Italy; Great Britain
Host nation			China
TOTAL			8

== Women's 10m Synchronized Diving ==
Competition	Date	Venue	Qualifiers
FINA World Championships	Mar 17 - Apr 1, 2007	(Australia) Melbourne	Australia; Germany; Canada
FINA Diving World Cup	February 19–25, 2008	(China) Beijing	Mexico; North Korea; Great Britain; United States
Host nation			China
TOTAL			8

== Men's 3m Individual Diving ==
Competition	Date	Venue	Qualifiers
FINA World Championships	Mar 17 - Apr 1, 2007	(Australia) Melbourne	(China) Qin Kai (Canada) Alexandre Despatie (Russia) Dmitry Sautin (Japan) Ken Terauchi (Russia) Aleksandr Dobroskok (China) He Chong (United States) Troy Dumais (Brazil) César Castro (Ukraine) Dmytro Lysenko (Belarus) Siarhei Kuchmasau (Cuba) Jorge Betancourt (Italy) Nicola Marconi
FINA Diving World Cup	February 19–25, 2008	(China) Beijing	(Mexico) Yahel Castillo (Germany) Pavlo Rozenberg (Ukraine) Illya Kvasha (United States) Christopher Colwill (Germany) Andreas Wels (Colombia) Juan Uran Salazar (Austria) Constantin Blaha (Australia) Matthew Mitcham (Finland) Joona Puhakka (Italy) Tommaso Marconi (Cuba) Jorge Pupo (Canada) Reuben Ross (Spain) Javier Illana (United Kingdom) Benjamin Swain (Venezuela) Ramon Fumado (Australia) Scott Robertson (South Korea) Son Seung Chel
TOTAL			29

== Men's 10m Individual Diving ==
Competition	Date	Venue	Qualifiers
FINA World Championships	Mar 17 - Apr 1, 2007	(Australia) Melbourne	(Russia) Gleb Galperin (China) Zhou Lüxin (China) Lin Yue (Russia) Dmitriy Dobroskok (Mexico) Rommel Pacheco (Cuba) Jose Guerra Oliva (Malaysia) Bryan Nickson Lomas (Canada) Alexandre Despatie (Belarus) Vadim Kaptur (United Kingdom) Peter Waterfield (Canada) Riley McCormick (Italy) Francesco Dell'Uomo
FINA Diving World Cup	February 19–25, 2008	(China) Beijing	(Germany) Sascha Klein (United States) David Boudia (Australia) Matthew Mitcham (Colombia) Juan Uran Salazar (United Kingdom) Thomas Daley (Ukraine) Anton Zakharov (Ukraine) Kostyantyn Milyayev (Cuba) Jeinkel Aguirre (Australia) Robert Newbery (Mexico) Germán Sánchez (North Korea) Kim Chon Man (United States) Thomas Finchum (Brazil) Hugo Parisi (Brazil) Cassius Duran (Belarus) Aliaksandr Varlamau (Philippines) Rexel Ryan Fabriga (Romania) Constantin Popovici (Germany) Norman Becker
TOTAL			30

== Women's 3m Individual Diving ==
Competition	Date	Venue	Qualifiers
FINA World Championships	Mar 17 - Apr 1, 2007	(Australia) Melbourne	(China) Guo Jingjing (China) Wu Minxia (Italy) Tania Cagnotto (Sweden) Anna Lindberg (Russia) Yuliya Pakhalina (United States) Nancilea Marie Foster (Germany) Katja Dieckow (Canada) Blythe Hartley (Mexico) Laura Sánchez (United States) Kelci Marie Bryant (Russia) Anastasia Pozdnyakova (Australia) Briony Cole
FINA Diving World Cup	February 19–25, 2008	(China) Beijing	(Australia) Sharleen Stratton (Ukraine) Olena Fedorova (Hungary) Nora Barta (Canada) Jennifer Abel (Belarus) Darya Romenskaya (Germany) Ditte Kotzian (Austria) Veronika Kratochwil (Philippines) Sheila Mae Perez (Colombia) Diana Pineda Zuleta (Italy) Maria Marconi (South Africa) Jenna Louise Dreyer (Mexico) Jashia Luña (United Kingdom) Jodie McGroarty (Malaysia) Elizabeth Jimie (Hungary) Gyongyver Kormos (Malaysia) Leong Mun Yee (Ukraine) Miriya Voloshchenko (Spain) Jenifer Benitez
TOTAL			30

== Women's 10m Individual Diving ==
Competition	Date	Venue	Qualifiers
FINA World Championships	Mar 17 - Apr 1, 2007	(Australia) Melbourne	(China) Wang Xin (China) Chen Ruolin (Germany) Christin Steuer (United States) Laura Ann Wilkinson (Canada) Émilie Heymans (France) Claire Febvay (Mexico) Paola Espinosa (Austria) Anja Richter (Germany) Annett Gamm (Italy) Valentina Marocchi (Australia) Melissa Wu (Canada) Roseline Filion
FINA Diving World Cup	February 19–25, 2008	(China) Beijing	(Australia) Loudy Wiggins (Japan) Mai Nakagawa (Mexico) Tatiana Ortiz (United States) Haley Ishimatsu (United Kingdom) Stacie Powell (Ukraine) Iuliia Prokopchuk (United Kingdom) Brooke Graddon (Romania) Ramona Ciobanu (North Korea) Kim Un Hyang (Italy) Tania Cagnotto (Russia) Tatiana Perunina (North Korea) Hong In Sun (Brazil) Juliana Veloso (Malaysia) Pandelela Rinong (Sweden) Elina Eggers (France) Audrey Labeau (Greece) Eftychia Pappa-Papavasilopoulou
TOTAL			29
