= Diving at the 2009 World Aquatics Championships – Women's synchronized 10 metre platform =

Following are the results of the Women's synchronized 10 metre platform event at the 2009 World Aquatics Championships held in Rome, Italy, from July 17 to August 2, 2009.

== Results ==
Green denotes finalists

Rank	Diver	Nationality	Preliminary		Final	
Rank	Diver	Nationality	Points	Rank	Points	Rank
1st place, gold medalist(s)	Chen Ruolin; Wang Xin	China	341.82	1	369.18	1
2nd place, silver medalist(s)	Mary Beth Dunnichay; Haley Ishimatsu	United States	313.02	4	324.66	2
3rd place, bronze medalist(s)	Leong Mun Yee; Pandelela Rinong Pamg	Malaysia	316.50	3	321.66	3
4	Meaghan Benfeito; Roseline Filion	Canada	317.10	2	321.39	4
5	Briony Cole; Melissa Wu	Australia	308.52	5	320.58	5
6	Monique Gladding; Megan Sylvester	Great Britain	299.16	7	306.90	6
7	Claire Febvay; Audrey Labeau	France	297.42	8	299.28	7
8	Josephine Moller; Nora Subschinski	Germany	307.98	6	299.22	8
9	Paola Espinosa; Laura Sánchez	Mexico	283.08	12	297.00	9
10	Valentina Marocchi; Brenda Spaziani	Italy	292.11	9	293.88	10
11	Natalia Goncharova; Yulia Koltunova	Russia	287.16	11	292.56	11
12	Yaima Rosario Mena Pena; Annia Rivera Robira	Cuba	291.00	10	281.34	12
13	Mara Elena Aiacoboae; Corina Popovici	Romania	245.46	13		
14	Villo Gyongyver Kormos; Zsófi Reisinger	Hungary	241.11	14		
