= Australia at the 2009 World Aquatics Championships =

- Flag of Australia
- World Aquatics code: AUS
- National federation: Swimming Australia
- Website: swimming.org.au

in Rome, Italy
- Competitors: 82
- Medals Ranked 5th: Gold 4 Silver 5 Bronze 10 Total 19

World Aquatics Championships appearances
- 1973; 1975; 1978; 1982; 1986; 1991; 1994; 1998; 2001; 2003; 2005; 2007; 2009; 2011; 2013; 2015; 2017; 2019; 2022; 2023; 2024; 2025

Australia competed at the 2009 World Aquatics Championships in Rome, Italy from 17 July to 2 August 2009.

== Diving ==
Men

Athlete	Event	Preliminaries		Semifinals		Final	
Athlete	Event	Points	Rank	Points	Rank	Points	Rank
Matthew Mitcham	1 m springboard	369.05	9 Q	—N/a		440.20	3rd place, bronze medalist(s)
Matthew Mitcham	3 m springboard	434.35	11 Q	467.15	5 Q	431.30	9
Matthew Mitcham	10 m platform	491.50	4 Q	499.00	2 Q	529.50	4
Grant Nel	1 m springboard	327.65	19	—N/a		did not advance	
Grant Nel	3 m springboard	332.70	37	did not advance			
Matthew Mitcham; Grant Nel	3 m synchronized springboard	367.17	14	—N/a		did not advance	

Women

Athlete	Event	Preliminaries		Semifinals		Final	
Athlete	Event	Points	Rank	Points	Rank	Points	Rank
Briony Cole	3 m springboard	266.40	14 Q	317.30	6 Q	311.50	9
Alex Croak	1 m springboard	234.15	18	—N/a		did not advance	
Alex Croak	10 m platform	323.85	5 Q	353.80	4 Q	351.85	7
Sharleen Stratton	1 m springboard	263.40	8 Q	—N/a		284.15	5
Sharleen Stratton	3 m springboard	291.70	8 Q	314.35	7 Q	327.75	6
Melissa Wu	10 m platform	359.80	2 Q	364.45	2 Q	329.75	11
Briony Cole; Sharleen Stratton	3 m synchronized springboard	301.74	6 Q	—N/a		309.18	5
Briony Cole; Melissa Wu	10 m synchronized platform	308.52	5 Q	—N/a		320.58	5

== Open water swimming ==
Men

Athlete	Event	Time	Rank
Andrew Beato	5 km	56:52.4	13
Brendan Capell	25 km	5:30:27.5	7
Trent Grimsey	5 km	57:07.2	16
Trent Grimsey	10 km	1:52:14.8	8
Trent Grimsey	25 km	5:26:50.7	2nd place, silver medalist(s)
Rhys Mainstone	10 km	1:52:50.2	21

Women

Athlete	Event	Time	Rank
Kate Brookes-Peterson	5 km	57:42.7	8
Shelley Clark	25 km	6:07:31.7	13
Danielle de Francesco	10 km	2:02:55.4	36
Danielle de Francesco	25 km	did not finish	
Melissa Gorman	5 km	56:55.8	1st place, gold medalist(s)
Melissa Gorman	10 km	2:02:16.0	29

== Swimming ==
Men

Athlete	Event	Heat		Semifinal		Final	
Athlete	Event	Time	Rank	Time	Rank	Time	Rank
Matthew Abood	50 m freestyle	21.90	11 Q	21.74	14	did not advance	
Matthew Abood	100 m freestyle	48.45	17	did not advance			
Leith Brodie	200 m individual medley	1:57.66 OC	3 Q	1:56.75 OC	3 Q	1:56.69 OC	5
Leith Brodie	400 m individual medley	4:15.52	14	—N/a		did not advance	
Ashley Delaney	50 m backstroke	24.97	=14 Q	25.02	16	did not advance	
Ashley Delaney	100 m backstroke	53.33	7 Q	53.24	10	did not advance	
Ashley Delaney	200 m backstroke	1:58.02	17	did not advance			
Tommaso D'Orsogna	200 m individual medley	2:00.31	18	did not advance			
Robert Hurley	400 m freestyle	3:46.01	11	—N/a		did not advance	
Robert Hurley	800 m freestyle	7:50.65	10	—N/a		did not advance	
Robert Hurley	1500 m freestyle	15:14.75	14	—N/a		did not advance	
Robert Hurley	100 m backstroke	55.18	32	did not advance			
Andrew Lauterstein	50 m butterfly	23.10	5 Q	23.19	10	did not advance	
Andrew Lauterstein	100 m butterfly	50.93	4 Q	51.03	7 Q	50.85 OC	5
Kenrick Monk	200 m freestyle	1:46.56	9 Q	1:45.77	7 Q	1:45.46	5
Patrick Murphy	200 m freestyle	1:46.61	10 Q	1:46.70	14	did not advance	
Ryan Napoleon	400 m freestyle	3:47.98	21	—N/a		did not advance	
Ryan Napoleon	800 m freestyle	7:53.92	12	—N/a		did not advance	
Ryan Napoleon	1500 m freestyle	15:09.55	11	—N/a		did not advance	
Stephen Parkes	400 m individual medley	4:18.60	22	—N/a		did not advance	
Adam Pine	100 m butterfly	51.98	21	did not advance			
Kyle Richardson	50 m freestyle	22.21	21	did not advance			
Brenton Rickard	50 m breaststroke	27.15 OC	3 Q	27.13 OC	4 Q	26.95 OC	=4
Brenton Rickard	100 m breaststroke	58.98 CR	1 Q	59.27	4 Q	58.58 WR	1st place, gold medalist(s)
Brenton Rickard	200 m breaststroke	2:10.54	16 Q	2:07.89	3 Q	2:08.23	5
Christian Sprenger	50 m breaststroke	27.88	37	did not advance			
Christian Sprenger	100 m breaststroke	59.52	=7 Q	59.98	=15	did not advance	
Christian Sprenger	200 m breaststroke	2:09.82	12 Q	2:07.31 WR	1 Q	2:07.80	= (bronze)
Lachlan Staples	200 m butterfly	1:57.21	22	did not advance			
Matt Targett	100 m freestyle	48.26	14 Q	48.15	11	did not advance	
Matt Targett	50 m butterfly	23.23	=8 Q	23.04	5 Q	22.73 OC	2nd place, silver medalist(s)
Chris Wright	200 m butterfly	1:57.54	27	did not advance			
Matthew Abood; Tommaso D'Orsogna; Andrew Lauterstein; Matt Targett	4 × 100 m freestyle relay	3:12.58	7 Q	—N/a		3:12.40	8
Tommaso D'Orsogna; Nic Ffrost*; Hurley; Kenrick Monk; Patrick Murphy; Kirk Palmer*	4 × 200 m freestyle relay	7:05.56	3 Q	—N/a		7:01.65 OC	3rd place, bronze medalist(s)
Ashley Delaney; Andrew Lauterstein; Brenton Rickard; Christian Sprenger*; Matt Targett	4 × 100 m medley relay	3:29.84 OC	2 Q	—N/a		3:28.64 OC	3rd place, bronze medalist(s)

Women

Athlete	Event	Heat		Semifinal		Final	
Athlete	Event	Time	Rank	Time	Rank	Time	Rank
Bronte Barratt	400 m freestyle	4:15.62	27	—N/a		did not advance	
Cate Campbell	50 m freestyle	24.24 CR	1 Q	24.08 CR	1 Q	23.99	= (bronze)
Sophie Edington	50 m backstroke	27.82	4 Q	27.51 OC	3 Q	27.73	6
Sophie Edington	200 m backstroke	2:11.53	16 Q	2:10.57	13	did not advance	
Blair Evans	800 m freestyle	8:38.10	18	—N/a		did not advance	
Sally Foster	200 m breaststroke	2:26.07	14 Q	2:27.03	15	did not advance	
Ellen Fullerton	200 m freestyle	1:58.10	15 Q	1:57.43	14	did not advance	
Ellen Fullerton	400 m freestyle	4:08.31	9	—N/a		did not advance	
Felicity Galvez	100 m butterfly	57.76	9 Q	57.71	13	did not advance	
Melissa Gorman	800 m freestyle	8:36.37	15	—N/a		did not advance	
Melissa Gorman	1500 m freestyle	16:16.83	8 Q	—N/a		16:09.66	7
Marieke Guehrer	100 m freestyle	54.60	16 Q	54.21	14	did not advance	
Marieke Guehrer	50 m butterfly	25.83	5 Q	25.58 OC	4 Q	25.48 OC	1st place, gold medalist(s)
Samantha Hamill	200 m butterfly	2:06.32	4 Q	2:05.99	7 Q	2:06.11	8
Samantha Hamill	400 m individual medley	4:37.84	9	—N/a		did not advance	
Belinda Hocking	100 m backstroke	1:00.90	17	did not advance			
Belinda Hocking	200 m backstroke	2:08.07	4 Q	2:09.77	9	did not advance	
Sarah Katsoulis	50 m breaststroke	30.48	3 Q	30.33	1 Q	30.16 OC	3rd place, bronze medalist(s)
Sarah Katsoulis	100 m breaststroke	1:06.98	7 Q	1:06.23	3 Q	1:05.86	4
Sarah Katsoulis	200 m breaststroke	2:27.32	27	did not advance			
Stephanie Rice	200 m freestyle	1:58.06	14 Q	1:58.33	16	did not advance	
Stephanie Rice	200 m individual medley	2:09.64	3 Q	2:08.68	2 Q	2:07.03 OC	2nd place, silver medalist(s)
Stephanie Rice	400 m individual medley	4:34.62	1 Q	—N/a		4:32.29	3rd place, bronze medalist(s)
Jessicah Schipper	100 m butterfly	57.17	3 Q	57.08	2 Q	56.23 OC	2nd place, silver medalist(s)
Jessicah Schipper	200 m butterfly	2:05.50	2 Q	2:04.87 OC	3 Q	2:03.41 WR	1st place, gold medalist(s)
Emily Seebohm	50 m backstroke	28.25	12 Q	27.70	=7 Q	27.83	7
Emily Seebohm	100 m backstroke	59.64	4 Q	59.15 OC	3 Q	58.88 OC	3rd place, bronze medalist(s)
Emily Seebohm	200 m individual medley	2:11.31	8 Q	2:12.88	15	did not advance	
Libby Trickett	50 m freestyle	24.74	9 Q	24.34	6 Q	24.19	6
Libby Trickett	100 m freestyle	53.49	2 Q	52.84	1 Q	52.93	3rd place, bronze medalist(s)
Libby Trickett	50 m butterfly	26.41	=17	did not advance			
Tarnee White	50 m breaststroke	30.96	8 Q	30.80	7 Q	30.91	8
Tarnee White	100 m breaststroke	1:06.91	6 Q	1:07.26	11	did not advance	
Sally Foster*; Felicity Galvez; Marieke Guehrer; Meagan Nay*; Shayne Reese; Libby Trickett	4 × 100 m freestyle relay	3:35.26	3 Q	—N/a		3:33.01 OC	3rd place, bronze medalist(s)
Bronte Barratt; Merindah Dingjan; Ellen Fullerton; Felicity Galvez*; Stephanie Rice	4 × 200 m freestyle relay	7:50.53	5 Q	—N/a		7:46.85	5
Sally Foster*; Sarah Katsoulis; Shayne Reese*; Stephanie Rice*; Jessicah Schipper; Emily Seebohm; Libby Trickett	4 × 100 m medley relay	3:58.36	7 Q	—N/a		3:52.58 OC	2nd place, silver medalist(s)

== Synchronised Swimming ==
Athlete	Event	Preliminaries		Final	
Athlete	Event	Points	Rank	Points	Rank
Yew Li Cheng	Solo technical routine	70.500	27	did not advance	
Tarren Otte	Solo free routine	75.834	24	did not advance	
Sarah Amberger; Eloise Bombell	Duet technical routine	76.667	27	did not advance	

== Water polo ==
=== Men's tournament ===
Team roster

No.	Name	Date of birth	L/R	Position	Height	Weight
1	James Stanton	21 July 1987	B	GK	2.00 m (6 ft 7 in)	
2	Richard Campbell	18 September 1987	R	CB	1.93 m (6 ft 4 in)	
3	Timothy Cleland	15 December 1984	R	CF	1.95 m (6 ft 5 in)	
4	Nicholas O'Halloran	14 August 1987	L	D	1.88 m (6 ft 2 in)	
5	Robert Maitland	4 September 1983	R	CB	1.90 m (6 ft 3 in)	
6	Anthony Martin	20 March 1985	R	CB	1.92 m (6 ft 4 in)	
7	John Cotterill	29 October 1987	R	D	1.93 m (6 ft 4 in)	
8	Grant Richardson	27 April 1981	R	D	1.82 m (6 ft 0 in)	
9	Thomas Whalan	13 October 1980	R	D	1.94 m (6 ft 4 in)	
10	William Miller	21 February 1988	R	D	1.84 m (6 ft 0 in)	
11	Rhys Howden	2 April 1987	R	D	1.88 m (6 ft 2 in)	
12	Sean Boyd	10 September 1978	R	CF	1.91 m (6 ft 3 in)	
13	Luke Quinlivan	20 August 1985	B	GK	1.92 m (6 ft 4 in)	

Group play

Team	Pld	W	D	L	GF	GA	GD	Pts
Spain	3	3	0	0	35	24	+11	6
Serbia	3	1	1	1	37	22	+15	3
Australia	3	1	1	1	32	28	+4	3
Kazakhstan	3	0	0	3	15	45	-30	0

20 July 2009; 17:00	Match 5	Kazakhstan	7–14	Australia	Attendance: 650; Referees: Stavropoulos (GRE), Matache (ROU)
20 July 2009; 17:00	Match 5	Score by quarters: 1-4, 2-4, 1-3, 3-3			Attendance: 650; Referees: Stavropoulos (GRE), Matache (ROU)
20 July 2009; 17:00	Match 5	Gorovoy, Andreyev, Kukumanov 2	Goals	Whalan 4	Attendance: 650; Referees: Stavropoulos (GRE), Matache (ROU)

22 July 2009; 12:10	Match 11	Spain	13–10	Australia	Attendance: 500; Referees: Margeta (SLO), Gomez (ITA)
22 July 2009; 12:10	Match 11	Score by quarters: 3-2, 3-2, 5-2, 2-4			Attendance: 500; Referees: Margeta (SLO), Gomez (ITA)
22 July 2009; 12:10	Match 11	Mallarach, Perrone 3	Goals	Whalan 3	Attendance: 500; Referees: Margeta (SLO), Gomez (ITA)

24 July 2009; 10:50	Match 18	Serbia	8–8	Australia	Attendance: 500; Referees: Turcotte (CAN), Gomez (ITA)
24 July 2009; 10:50	Match 18	Score by quarters: 2-1, 1-2, 3-4, 2-1			Attendance: 500; Referees: Turcotte (CAN), Gomez (ITA)
24 July 2009; 10:50	Match 18	Filipović 3	Goals	Cotterill, Whalan 3	Attendance: 500; Referees: Turcotte (CAN), Gomez (ITA)

Quarterfinal

26 July 2009; 16:50	Match 30	Australia	5–7	Romania	Attendance: 1,000; Referees: Borrell (ESP), Margeta (SLO)
26 July 2009; 16:50	Match 30	Score by quarters: 1-2, 1-1, 1-2, 2-2			Attendance: 1,000; Referees: Borrell (ESP), Margeta (SLO)
26 July 2009; 16:50	Match 30	Campbell, Whalan 2	Goals	Radu, Diaconu 2	Attendance: 1,000; Referees: Borrell (ESP), Margeta (SLO)

9th-12th place semifinal

28 July 2009; 12:40	Match 34	Italy	6–8	Australia	Attendance: 600; Referees: Ciric (SRB), Spiegel (GER)
28 July 2009; 12:40	Match 34	Score by quarters: 2-2, 1-1, 2-3, 1-2			Attendance: 600; Referees: Ciric (SRB), Spiegel (GER)
28 July 2009; 12:40	Match 34	Calcaterra 3	Goals	Campbell 3	Attendance: 600; Referees: Ciric (SRB), Spiegel (GER)

9th place game

30 July 2009; 10:20	Match 40	Montenegro	8–7	Australia	Attendance: 600; Referees: Balfanbayev (KAZ), Stravropoulos (GRE)
30 July 2009; 10:20	Match 40	Score by quarters: 1-3, 2-1, 1-2, 4-1			Attendance: 600; Referees: Balfanbayev (KAZ), Stravropoulos (GRE)
30 July 2009; 10:20	Match 40	Ivović 3	Goals	Campbell 2	Attendance: 600; Referees: Balfanbayev (KAZ), Stravropoulos (GRE)

=== Women's tournament ===
Roster

No.	Name	Date of birth	L/R	Position	Height	Weight
1	Alicia Mc Cormack	7 June 1983	R	GK	1.68 m (5 ft 6 in)	
2	Holly Lincoln-Smith	1 January 1989	R	CF	1.79 m (5 ft 10 in)	
3	Sophie Smith	26 February 1986	R	D	1.81 m (5 ft 11 in)	
4	Rebecca Rippon	26 December 1978	R	D	1.67 m (5 ft 6 in)	
5	Jane Moran	6 June 1985	R	D	1.67 m (5 ft 6 in)	
6	Bronwen Knox	16 April 1986	R	CB	1.82 m (6 ft 0 in)	
7	Rowena Webster	27 December 1987	R	D	1.77 m (5 ft 10 in)	
8	Kate Gynther	5 July 1982	R	D	1.74 m (5 ft 9 in)	
9	Glencora Ralph	8 August 1988	R	D	1.78 m (5 ft 10 in)	
10	Jemma Dessauvagie	20 August 1986	R	CF	1.79 m (5 ft 10 in)	
11	Melissa Rippon	20 January 1981	R	D	1.69 m (5 ft 7 in)	
12	Nicola Zagame	11 August 1990	R	CB	1.60 m (5 ft 3 in)	
13	Victoria Brown	27 July 1985	R	GK	1.83 m (6 ft 0 in)	

Group play

Team	Pld	W	D	L	GF	GA	GD	Pts
Australia	3	2	1	0	43	12	+31	5
Canada	3	2	1	0	38	17	+21	5
New Zealand	3	1	0	2	22	31	-9	2
South Africa	3	0	0	3	12	55	-43	0

July 19, 2009; 15:00	Match 5	Canada	6–6	Australia	Attendance: 200; Referees: Borrell (ESP), Sadekov (RUS)
July 19, 2009; 15:00	Match 5	Score by quarters: 0-1, 2-3, 3-1, 1-1			Attendance: 200; Referees: Borrell (ESP), Sadekov (RUS)
July 19, 2009; 15:00	Match 5	Perreault 2	Goals	Webster 2	Attendance: 200; Referees: Borrell (ESP), Sadekov (RUS)

July 21, 2009; 12:10	Match 11	Australia	23–2	South Africa	Attendance: 300; Referees: Koganov (AZE), Mernenko (UZB)
July 21, 2009; 12:10	Match 11	Score by quarters: 4-1, 8-1, 6-0, 5-0			Attendance: 300; Referees: Koganov (AZE), Mernenko (UZB)
July 21, 2009; 12:10	Match 11	Knox, Zagame 5	Goals	Harris 2	Attendance: 300; Referees: Koganov (AZE), Mernenko (UZB)

July 23, 2009; 09:30	Match 17	New Zealand	4–14	Australia	Attendance: 200; Referees: Ciric (SRB), Patelli (BRA)
July 23, 2009; 09:30	Match 17	Score by quarters: 2-3, 2-4, 0-2, 0-5			Attendance: 200; Referees: Ciric (SRB), Patelli (BRA)
July 23, 2009; 09:30	Match 17	Hudson 3	Goals	Rippon, Knox, Webster 3	Attendance: 200; Referees: Ciric (SRB), Patelli (BRA)

Quarterfinal

July 27, 2009; 16:40	Match 37	Australia	3–4	Greece	Attendance: 500; Referees: Peris (CRO), Matache (ROU)
July 27, 2009; 16:40	Match 37	Score by quarters: 1-2, 0-1, 1-0, 1-1			Attendance: 500; Referees: Peris (CRO), Matache (ROU)
July 27, 2009; 16:40	Match 37	Gynther 3	Goals	Gerolimou 4	Attendance: 500; Referees: Peris (CRO), Matache (ROU)

5th-8th place semifinal

July 29, 2009; 15:30	Match 42	Australia	7–6	Spain	Attendance: 700; Referees: Spiegel (GER), Balfanbayev (KAZ)
July 29, 2009; 15:30	Match 42	Score by quarters: 3-0, 2-2, 1-2, 1-2			Attendance: 700; Referees: Spiegel (GER), Balfanbayev (KAZ)
July 29, 2009; 15:30	Match 42	Moran 2	Goals	Lopez-Escribano, López 2	Attendance: 700; Referees: Spiegel (GER), Balfanbayev (KAZ)

5th place game

July 31, 2009; 10:40	Match 46	Netherlands	12–11	Australia	Attendance: 400; Referees: Spiegel (GER), Ciric (SRB)
July 31, 2009; 10:40	Match 46	Score by quarters: 3-3, 3-3, 2-3, 4-2			Attendance: 400; Referees: Spiegel (GER), Ciric (SRB)
July 31, 2009; 10:40	Match 46	Cabout 4	Goals	Knox 4	Attendance: 400; Referees: Spiegel (GER), Ciric (SRB)
