= Diving at the 2009 World Aquatics Championships – Women's 10 metre platform =

Competition at the 13th World Aquatics Championships

Following are the results of the Women's 10 metre platform diving event at the 2009 World Aquatics Championships held in Rome, Italy, from July 17 to August 2, 2009.

== Results ==
Green denotes finalists

Rank	Diver	Nationality	Preliminary		Semifinal		Final	
Rank	Diver	Nationality	Points	Rank	Points	Rank	Points	Rank
1st place, gold medalist(s)	Paola Espinosa	Mexico	292.85	18	359.75	3	428.25	1
2nd place, silver medalist(s)	Chen Ruolin	China	388.65	1	351.45	5	417.60	2
3rd place, bronze medalist(s)	Kang Li	China	342.40	3	390.95	1	410.35	3
4	Meaghan Benfeito	Canada	298.95	16	350.95	6	396.50	4
5	Pandelela Rinong Pamg	Malaysia	314.10	9	306.05	11	354.45	5
6	Christin Steuer	Germany	336.60	4	341.85	7	353.75	6
7	Alex Croak	Australia	323.85	5	353.80	4	351.85	7
8	Tonia Couch	Great Britain	321.85	7	293.05	12	351.00	8
9	Audrey Labeau	France	318.90	8	313.85	10	348.90	9
10	Roseline Filion	Canada	322.35	6	333.65	8	340.20	10
11	Melissa Wu	Australia	359.80	2	364.45	2	329.75	11
12	Yulia Koltunova	Russia	302.35	12	329.70	9	321.70	12
13	Nora Subschinski	Germany	301.75	14	276.10	13		
14	Mai Nakagawa	Japan	309.50	11	274.40	14		
15	Kim Jin Ok	North Korea	302.00	13	265.05	15		
16	Laura Sánchez	Mexico	299.95	15	262.95	16		
17	Haley Ishimatsu	United States	312.90	10	259.90	17		
18	Brittany Viola	United States	298.80	17	254.90	18		
19	Claire Febvay	France	292.00	19				
20	Yaima Rosario Mena Pena	Cuba	286.05	20				
21	Brenda Spaziani	Italy	281.55	21				
22	Villo Gyongyver Kormos	Hungary	274.75	22				
23	Melinda Beatrix Matyas	Hungary	274.65	23				
24	Iuliia Prokopchuk	Ukraine	272.80	24				
25	Noemi Batki	Italy	268.35	25				
26	Elina Eggers	Sweden	264.80	26				
27	Brooke Graddon	Great Britain	251.05	27				
28	Milica Stjepanovic	Serbia	235.70	28				
29	Corina Popovici	Romania	228.45	29				
30	Traisy Vivien Tukiet	Malaysia	219.80	30				
31	Annia Rivera Robira	Cuba	191.60	31				
