= Diving at the 2004 Summer Olympics – Women's 10 metre platform =

Women's 10 metre platform at the Games of the XXVIII Olympiad

Medalists
1st place, gold medalist(s)		Chantelle Newbery	Australia
2nd place, silver medalist(s)		Lao Lishi	China
3rd place, bronze medalist(s)		Loudy Tourky	Australia

The women's 10 metre platform was one of eight diving events included in the Diving at the 2004 Summer Olympics programme.

The competition was split into three phases:

Preliminary round
21 August — Each diver performed five dives out of a group consisting of a front dive, a back dive, a reverse dive, an inward dive, a twisting dive and an armstand dive. There were no limitations in degree of difficulty. The 18 divers with the highest total score advanced to the semi-final.
Semi-final
22 August — Each diver performed four dives out of a group consisting of a front dive, a back dive, a reverse dive, an inward dive, a twisting dive and an armstand dive, all limited in difficulty degree. The 12 divers with the highest combined score from the semi-final and preliminary dives advanced to the final.
Final
22 August — Each diver performed five dives out of a group consisting of a front dive, a back dive, a reverse dive, an inward dive, a twisting dive and an armstand dive. The final ranking was determined by the combined score from the final and semi-final dives.

== Results ==
Rank	Diver	Nation	Preliminary		Semifinal				Final		
Rank	Diver	Nation	Points	Rank	Points	Rank	Total	Rank	Points	Rank	Total
1st place, gold medalist(s)	Chantelle Newbery	Australia	346.95	6	198.30	3	545.25	3	392.01	1	590.31
2nd place, silver medalist(s)	Lao Lishi	China	348.93	4	203.04	1	551.97	2	373.26	2	576.30
3rd place, bronze medalist(s)	Loudy Tourky	Australia	367.23	2	192.87	5	560.10	1	368.79	3	561.66
4	Émilie Heymans	Canada	351.12	3	187.05	8	538.17	5	367.98	4	555.03
5	Laura Wilkinson	United States	314.19	13	194.52	4	508.71	10	355.20	5	549.72
6	Li Ting	China	339.69	7	198.33	2	538.02	6	348.15	6	546.48
7	Myriam Boileau	Canada	329.64	9	187.92	6	517.56	9	342.33	7	530.25
8	Tania Cagnotto	Italy	339.15	8	187.29	7	526.44	7	331.38	8	518.67
9	Olena Zhupina	Ukraine	371.10	1	172.47	11	543.57	4	325.23	9	497.70
10	Sara Hildebrand	United States	308.49	14	180.69	9	489.18	11	304.08	11	484.77
11	Takiri Miyazaki	Japan	315.78	12	170.85	13	486.63	12	308.25	10	479.10
12	Paola Espinosa	Mexico	348.03	5	171.18	12	519.21	8	284.22	12	455.40
13	Jashia Luna	Mexico	328.62	10	153.18	17	481.80	13	did not advance		
14	Annett Gamm	Germany	301.86	18	176.34	10	478.20	14	did not advance		
15	Anja Richter	Austria	302.16	17	170.28	14	472.44	15	did not advance		
16	Juliana Veloso	Brazil	302.31	16	167.64	15	469.95	16	did not advance		
17	Eftihia Pappa	Greece	307.65	15	156.24	16	463.89	17	did not advance		
18	Angelique Rodríguez	Puerto Rico	316.08	11	139.86	18	455.94	18	did not advance		
19	Svetlana Timoshinina	Russia	289.68	19	did not advance						
20	Dolores Sáez	Spain	278.43	20	did not advance						
21	Leong Mun Yee	Malaysia	273.33	21	did not advance						
22	Jon Hyon-ju	North Korea	272.01	22	did not advance						
23	Olha Leonova	Ukraine	271.92	23	did not advance						
24	Ramona Maria Ciobanu	Romania	268.23	24	did not advance						
25	Kim Kyong-ju	North Korea	263.52	25	did not advance						
26	Yolanda Ortíz	Cuba	259.47	26	did not advance						
27	Yulia Koltunova	Russia	257.55	27	did not advance						
28	Christin Steuer	Germany	256.77	28	did not advance						
29	Leire Santos	Spain	246.84	29	did not advance						
30	Yaima Mena	Cuba	238.44	30	did not advance						
31	Marion Reiff	Austria	232.35	31	did not advance						
32	Valentina Marocchi	Italy	221.85	32	did not advance						
33	Claire Febvay	France	195.06	33	did not advance						
34	Jenna Dreyer	South Africa	186.90	34	did not advance						

== Sources ==
- "Diving Results". Athens 2004 Summer Olympics. Yahoo!.
