= Diving at the 2009 World Aquatics Championships – Women's 3 metre springboard =

Following are the results of the Women's 3 metre springboard diving event at the 2009 World Aquatics Championships held in Rome, Italy, from July 17 to August 2, 2009.

== Results ==
Green denotes finalists

Rank	Diver	Nationality	Preliminary		Semifinal		Final	
Rank	Diver	Nationality	Points	Rank	Points	Rank	Points	Rank
1st place, gold medalist(s)	Guo Jingjing	China	377.55	1	368.10	1	388.20	1
2nd place, silver medalist(s)	Émilie Heymans	Canada	289.20	9	310.30	10	346.45	2
3rd place, bronze medalist(s)	Tania Cagnotto	Italy	321.90	3	334.65	4	341.25	3
4	He Zi	China	341.40	2	351.45	3	336.65	4
5	Ariel Rittenhouse	United States	262.70	16	300.45	12	335.10	5
6	Sharleen Stratton	Australia	291.70	8	314.35	7	327.75	6
7	Anastasia Pozdniakova	Russia	294.15	7	310.95	8	320.65	7
8	Christina Loukas	United States	315.15	4	318.30	5	320.20	8
9	Briony Cole	Australia	266.40	14	317.30	6	311.50	9
10	Laura Sanchez	Mexico	308.90	5	310.50	9	300.60	10
11	Jennifer Abel	Canada	288.50	10	351.65	2	265.55	11
12	Katja Dieckow	Germany	294.70	6	305.40	11	252.30	12
13	Paola Espinosa	Mexico	260.90	17	292.80	13		
14	Olena Fedorova	Ukraine	282.70	11	276.15	14		
15	Rebecca Gallantree	Great Britain	274.70	12	271.80	15		
16	Francesca Dallapè	Italy	272.25	13	269.85	16		
17	En-Tien Huang	Chinese Taipei	263.10	15	252.40	17		
18	Diana Pineda	Colombia	258.95	18	229.20	18		
19	Raisa Geurtsen	Netherlands	256.55	19				
20	Anna Pysmenska	Ukraine	255.45	20				
21	Sayaka Shibusawa	Japan	252.40	21				
22	Leong Mun Yee	Malaysia	249.10	22				
23	Piroska Flóra Gondos	Hungary	247.25	23				
24	Villo Gyongyver Kormos	Hungary	246.75	24				
25	Veronika Kratochwil	Austria	246.20	25				
26	Uschi Freitag	Germany	237.30	26				
27	Leyre Eizaguirre	Spain	218.70	27				
28	Choi Sut Ian	Macau	206.90	28				
29	Lei Sio I	Macau	192.30	29				
30	Sari Ambarwati Suprihatin	Indonesia	155.55	30				
31	Marija Ivezic	Serbia	148.35	31				
