= Annett Gamm =

German diver (born 1977)

Personal information
- Nationality: German
- Born: 28 May 1977 (age 49) Dresden, Sachsen, East Germany
- Height: 1.67 m (5 ft 5 1/2 in)
- Weight: 54 kg (119 lb)

Sport
- Sport: Diving
- Event(s): 10 m, 10 m synchro
- Club: Dresdner SC
- Partner: Nora Subschinski
Medal record
Women's diving
Representing Germany
World Championships
Bronze medal – third place	2007 Melbourne	10 m synchro
European Championships
Gold medal – first place	2002 Berlin	10 m synchro
Gold medal – first place	2004 Madrid	10 m synchro
Gold medal – first place	2006 Budapest	10 m synchro
Gold medal – first place	2008 Eindhoven	10 m synchro

Annett Gamm (born 28 May 1977) is a German platform diver. She is a two-time Olympian (2004 and 2008), a multiple-time German diving champion, and a four-time consecutive gold medalist in the women's synchronized platform at the European Aquatics Championships (2002, 2004, 2006, and 2008). Gamm is also a member of the diving team for Dresdner SC, and is coached and trained by Frank Taubert, who competed in the men's springboard and platform events at the 1976 Summer Olympics in Montreal, and at the 1980 Summer Olympics in Moscow, representing East Germany.

== Diving career ==
At age twenty-seven, Gamm made her official debut for the 2004 Summer Olympics in Athens, where she competed in two platform diving events. She placed fourteenth in the women's platform by six points ahead of Austria's Anja Richter, posting a total score of 478.20. She also finished in sixth place, along with her partner Nora Subschinski, in the women's synchronized platform, by four points behind the Mexican team (Jashia Luna and Paola Espinosa), with a score of 303.30.

In 2007, Gamm reached her breakthrough season in diving, when she and her partner Subschinski earned a bronze medal for the same discipline at the FINA World Championships in Melbourne, Australia, accumulating a score of 306.63 points. At the 2008 European Aquatics Championships in Eindhoven, Netherlands, Gamm captured her fourth consecutive gold medal (the first being done in 2002), along with her partner Subschinski, in the women's synchronized platform, with a total score of 336.63.

Four years after competing in her first Olympics, Gamm qualified for her second German team, as a 31-year-old, at the 2008 Summer Olympics in Beijing. She first teamed up with Subschinski in the women's 10 m synchronized platform, but managed to finish fourth in the final by one point ahead of the U.S. team (Mary Beth Dunnichay and Haley Ishimatsu), recording their final score at 310.29. A week later, Gamm placed last out of twenty-nine divers in the preliminary round of the women's platform event, by six points behind Russia's Natalia Goncharova, with a total score of 234.30.
