= Diving at the 2008 Summer Olympics – Women's 10 metre platform =

Women's 10 metre platform at the Games of the XXIX Olympiad
- Date: 20–21 August

Medalists
1st place, gold medalist(s)		Chen Ruolin	China
2nd place, silver medalist(s)		Émilie Heymans	Canada
3rd place, bronze medalist(s)		Wang Xin	China

Women's 10 metre platform competition at the Beijing 2008 Summer Olympics took place from August 20 to August 21, at the Beijing National Aquatics Center. It was an individual diving competition, with dives performed from an inflexible platform (unlike the springboard used for three metre diving) ten metres above the surface of the water.

The individual diving competitions all consist of three rounds. In the first, the 29 divers each perform five dives. The top 18 divers advance to the semifinals. Each diver again performs five dives, and the top 12 divers from among those dives advance to the finals. Preliminary scores are ignored at this point, as only the semifinal scores are considered in advancement. In the final round, the divers perform a final set of five dives, with the scores from those dives (and only those dives) used to determine final ranking.

Seven judges evaluate each dive, giving the diver a score between 0 and 10 with increments of 0.5; scores below 7.0 or above 9.5 are rare. The two highest and two lowest scores from each judge are dropped. The remaining three scores are summed, and multiplied by the degree of difficulty of the dive to give the total score for the dive. Scores from each dive in the round are summed to give the round score.

== Results ==
Rank	Diver	Nation	Preliminary		Semifinal		Final
Rank	Diver	Nation	Points	Rank	Points	Rank	Points
1st place, gold medalist(s)	Chen Ruolin	China	428.80	1	444.60	1	447.70
2nd place, silver medalist(s)	Émilie Heymans	Canada	403.85	3	374.10	4	437.05
3rd place, bronze medalist(s)	Wang Xin	China	420.30	2	388.55	3	429.90
4	Paola Espinosa	Mexico	343.60	7	400.75	2	380.95
5	Tatiana Ortiz	Mexico	345.70	6	349.50	5	343.60
6	Melissa Wu	Australia	340.35	8	331.35	8	338.15
7	Marie-Ève Marleau	Canada	296.50	17	335.25	7	332.10
8	Tonia Couch	Great Britain	320.40	12	297.20	12	328.70
9	Laura Wilkinson	United States	370.70	5	346.10	6	311.80
10	Stacie Powell	Great Britain	313.90	14	301.75	11	303.50
11	Mai Nakagawa	Japan	331.40	9	314.60	10	296.30
12	Elina Eggers	Sweden	309.45	16	315.45	9	285.85
13	Tania Cagnotto	Italy	328.30	11	296.60	13	Did not advance
14	Haley Ishimatsu	United States	329.00	10	292.95	14	Did not advance
15	Valentina Marocchi	Italy	313.05	15	283.15	15	Did not advance
16	Kim Un-hyang	North Korea	316.20	13	267.00	16	Did not advance
17	Kim Jin-ok	North Korea	291.90	18	259.40	17	Did not advance
18	Alexandra Croak	Australia	383.75	4	250.30	18	Did not advance
19	Christin Steuer	Germany	290.80	19	did not advance		
20	Iuliia Prokopchuk	Ukraine	290.40	20	did not advance		
21	Audrey Labeau	France	289.95	21	did not advance		
22	Anja Richter	Austria	287.70	22	did not advance		
23	Juliana Veloso	Brazil	283.75	23	did not advance		
24	Ramona Maria Ciobanu	Romania	279.10	24	did not advance		
25	Claire Febvay	France	255.30	25	did not advance		
26	Eftychia Pappa-Papavasilopoulou	Greece	252.00	26	did not advance		
27	Pandelela Rinong	Malaysia	249.20	27	did not advance		
28	Natalia Goncharova	Russia	240.45	28	did not advance		
29	Annett Gamm	Germany	234.30	29	did not advance		
