= Diving at the 2009 World Aquatics Championships – Women's 1 metre springboard =

Results of Women's springboard diving event in Rome in 2009

Following are the results of the Women's 1 metre springboard diving event at the 2009 World Aquatics Championships held in Rome, Italy, from July 17 to August 2, 2009.

== Results ==
Green denotes finalists

Rank	Diver	Nationality	Preliminary		Final	
Rank	Diver	Nationality	Points	Rank	Points	Rank
1st place, gold medalist(s)	Yuliya Pakhalina	Russia	315.35	1	325.05	1
2nd place, silver medalist(s)	Wu Minxia	China	292.25	2	311.90	2
3rd place, bronze medalist(s)	Wang Han	China	282.30	4	303.95	3
4	Tania Cagnotto	Italy	285.20	3	296.60	4
5	Sharleen Stratton	Australia	263.40	8	284.15	5
6	Maria Elisabetta Marconi	Italy	275.40	5	268.80	6
7	Rebecca Gallantree	Great Britain	261.60	9	267.55	7
8	Christina Loukas	United States	264.40	7	266.35	8
9	Katja Dieckow	Germany	247.15	12	265.40	9
10	Melanie Rinaldi	Canada	270.95	6	256.35	10
11	Veronika Kratochwil	Austria	252.00	11	238.30	11
12	Jennifer Abel	Canada	260.55	10	236.80	12
13	Caroline Burger	Germany	244.90	13		
14	Brittany Viola	United States	244.80	14		
15	Leong Mun Yee	Malaysia	242.65	15		
16	Anna Pysmenska	Ukraine	239.00	16		
17	Alevtyna Korolyova	Ukraine	235.40	17		
18	Alex Croak	Australia	234.15	18		
19	Diana Pineda	Colombia	228.10	19		
20	Arantxa Chavez	Mexico	226.45	20		
21	Anastasia Pozdniakova	Russia	224.45	21		
22	Raisa Geurtsen	Netherlands	223.85	22		
23	Sayaka Shibusawa	Japan	220.35	23		
24	Leyre Eizaguirre	Spain	213.70	24		
25	Huang EnTien	Chinese Taipei	212.60	25		
26	Choi Sut Ian	Macau	201.10	26		
27	Lei Sio I	Macau	187.55	27		
28	Piroska Flóra Gondos	Hungary	183.40	28		
29	Marija Ivezic	Serbia	182.85	29		
