= Diving at the 2012 Summer Olympics – Women's 10 metre platform =

Women's 10 metre platform diving at the Games of the XXX Olympiad
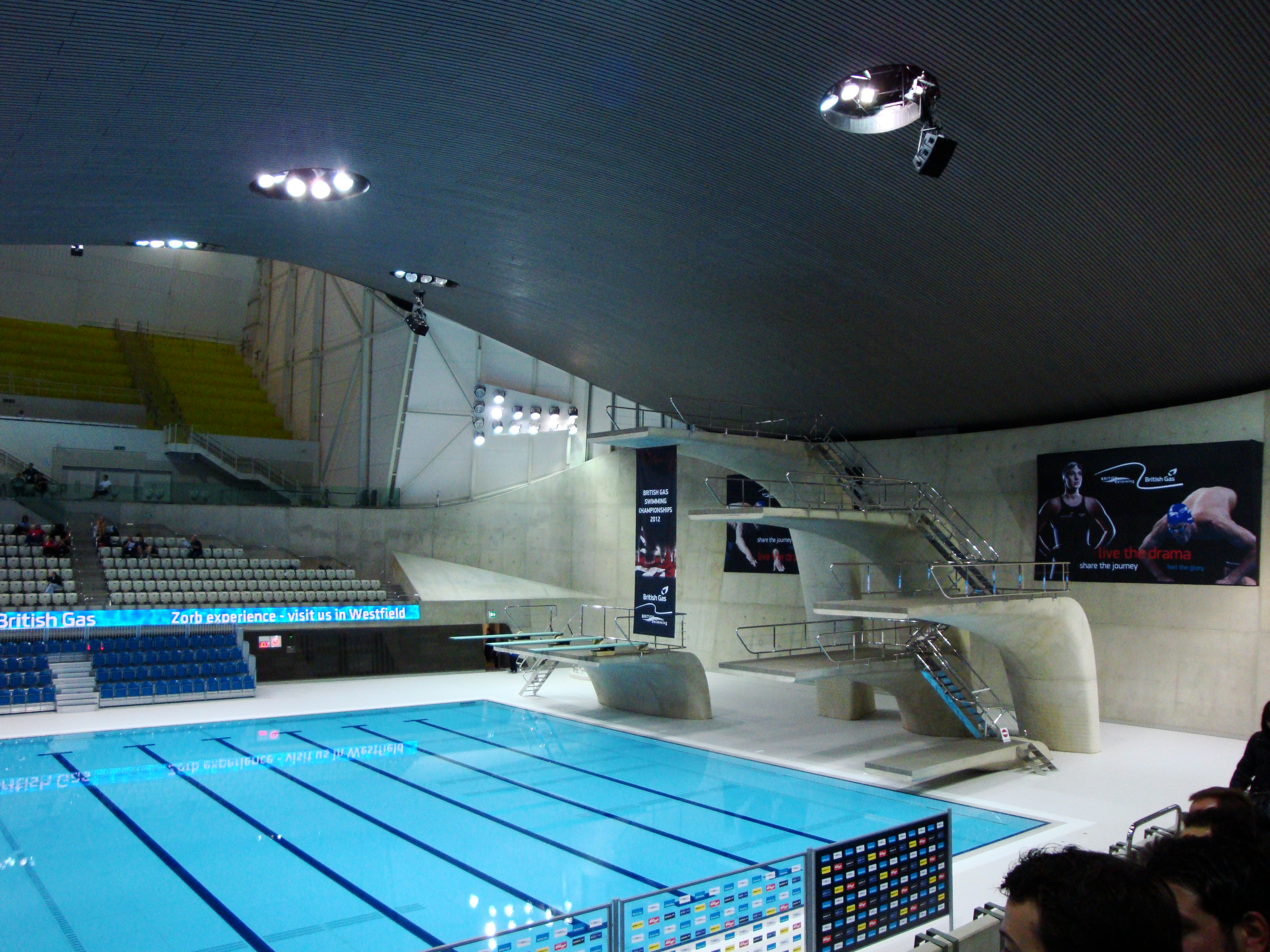
- Aquatics Centre
- Venue: Aquatics Centre
- Date: 8–9 August
- Competitors: 26 from 19 nations
- Winning points: 422.30

Medalists
1st place, gold medalist(s)		Chen Ruolin	China
2nd place, silver medalist(s)		Brittany Broben	Australia
3rd place, bronze medalist(s)		Pandelela Rinong	Malaysia

The women's 10 metre platform diving competition at the 2012 Olympic Games in London took place on 8 and 9 August at the Aquatics Centre within the Olympic Park. Chen Ruolin successfully defended her Olympic title ahead of Australia's Brittany Broben by over 50 points. Pandelela Rinong won Malaysia's first Olympic medal in a sport other than badminton as well as Malaysia's first female Olympic medalist.

The competition comprised three rounds:

- Preliminary round: All 26 divers perform five dives; the top 18 divers advance to the semi-final.
- Semi-final: The 18 divers perform five dives; the scores of the qualifications are erased and the top 12 divers advance to the final.
- Final: The 12 divers perform five dives; the semi-final scores are erased and the top three divers win the gold, silver and bronze medals accordingly.

== Schedule ==
All times are British Summer Time (UTC+1)

Date	Time	Round
Wednesday 8 August 2012	19:00	Preliminary
Thursday 9 August 2012	10:00; 19:00	Semi-final; Final

== Results ==
Rank	Diver	Nation	Preliminary		Semi-final		Final					
Rank	Diver	Nation	Points	Rank	Total	Rank	Dive 1	Dive 2	Dive 3	Dive 4	Dive 5	Total
1st place, gold medalist(s)	Chen Ruolin	China	392.35	1	407.25	1	85.50	84.80	86.40	79.20	86.40	422.30
2nd place, silver medalist(s)	Brittany Broben	Australia	339.80	4	359.55	3	60.75	83.20	83.20	57.75	81.60	366.50
3rd place, bronze medalist(s)	Pandelela Rinong	Malaysia	349.00	2	352.50	5	58.50	78.30	64.00	81.60	76.80	359.20
4	Melissa Wu	Australia	337.90	5	355.60	4	78.00	72.00	56.10	75.20	76.80	358.10
5	Yulia Koltunova	Russia	334.80	7	351.90	6	72.85	61.05	72.00	78.40	73.60	357.90
6	Paola Espinosa	Mexico	324.00	13	317.10	11	70.50	74.25	61.05	80.00	70.40	356.20
7	Christin Steuer	Germany	341.75	3	339.90	7	60.20	76.80	62.40	73.95	78.00	351.35
8	Noemi Batki	Italy	324.20	12	325.45	10	76.50	65.25	72.00	68.80	67.50	350.05
9	Hu Yadan	China	337.85	6	328.25	9	54.00	43.20	76.80	89.10	86.40	349.50
10	Roseline Filion	Canada	314.85	17	329.60	8	63.00	75.90	67.20	72.60	70.40	349.10
11	Meaghan Benfeito	Canada	325.50	10	359.90	2	49.50	80.85	72.00	66.00	76.80	345.15
12	Iuliia Prokopchuk	Ukraine	324.85	11	315.80	12	70.50	72.00	65.25	79.20	57.60	344.55
13	Kim Un-Hyang	North Korea	308.10	18	314.40	13	did not advance					
14	Kim Jin-Ok	North Korea	320.10	15	312.95	14	did not advance					
15	Brittany Viola	United States	322.55	14	300.50	15	did not advance					
16	Katie Bell	United States	326.95	9	296.80	16	did not advance					
17	Maria Kurjo	Germany	319.65	16	264.45	17	did not advance					
18	Mai Nakagawa	Japan	327.65	8	260.05	18	did not advance					
19	Monique Gladding	Great Britain	301.45	19	did not advance							
20	Stacie Powell	Great Britain	287.30	20	did not advance							
21	Carolina Mendoza	Mexico	286.95	21	did not advance							
22	Traisy Vivien Tukiet	Malaysia	285.00	22	did not advance							
23	Brenda Spaziani	Italy	268.00	23	did not advance							
24	Audrey Labeau	France	261.05	24	did not advance							
25	Annia Rivera	Cuba	233.95	25	did not advance							
26	Kim Su-ji	South Korea	215.75	26	did not advance							
