= Florentia Sfakianou =

Greek diver (born 1987)

Personal information
- Native name: Φλωρεντία Σφακιανού
- Nationality: Greek
- Born: 15 July 1987 (age 37); Athens, Attica, Greece
- Height: 171 cm (5 ft 7 in)
- Weight: 57 kg (126 lb)

Sport
- Sport: Diving

Florentia Sfakianou (Greek: Φλωρεντία Σφακιανού; born 15 July 1987) is a former Greek diver. Sfakianou, along with partner Eftihia Pappa, competed in the synchronised 10 metre platform event at the 2004 Summer Olympics in her hometown Athens. The pair finished in 8th place.
