= Brittany Broben =

Australian diver

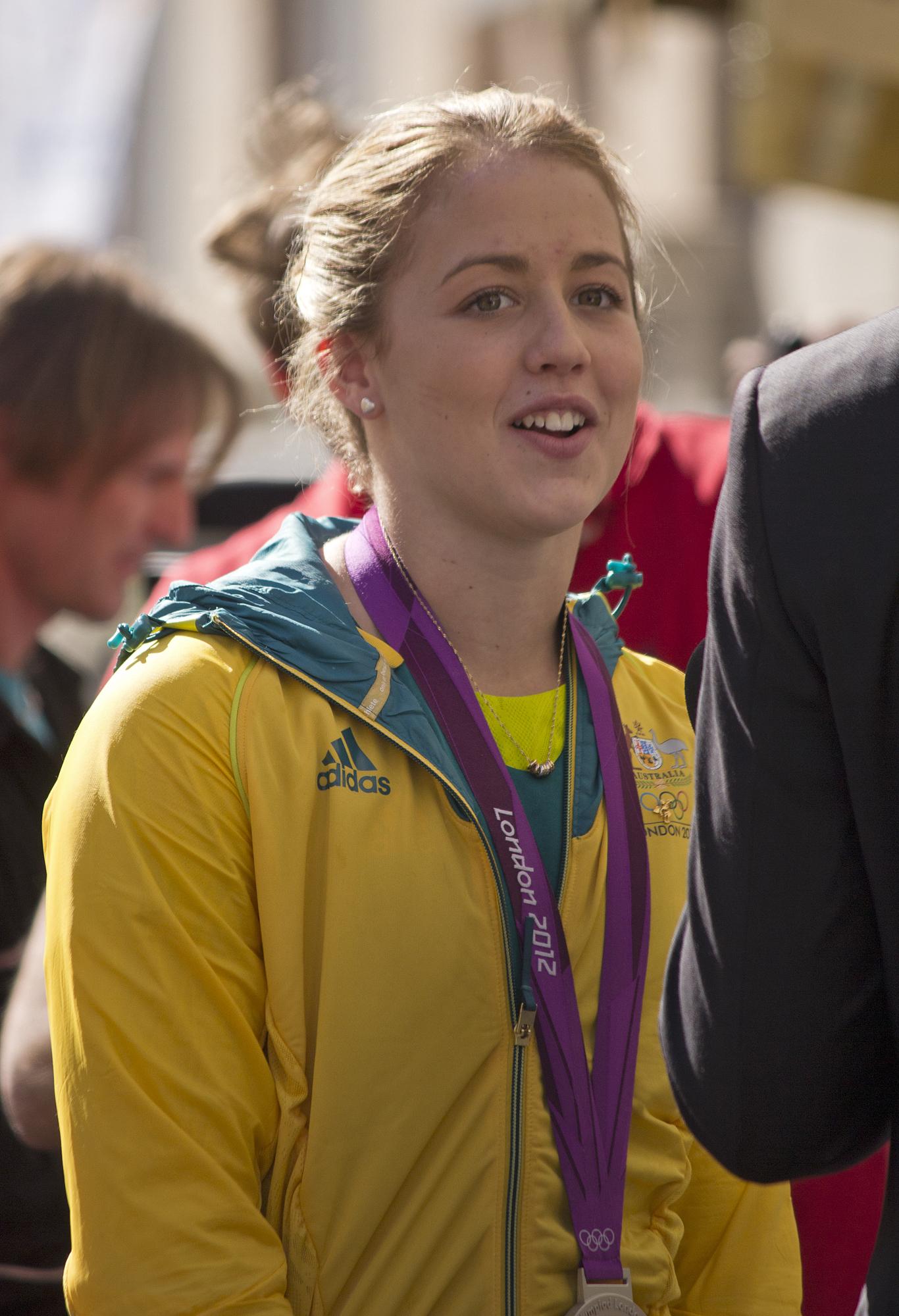
- Broben being interviewed by Fox Sports News at the Welcome Home parade in Sydney

Personal information
- Nickname: Britt
- Nationality: Australian
- Born: 23 November 1995 (age 30) Gold Coast, Queensland
- Height: 160 cm (63 in) (2012)
- Weight: 48 kg (106 lb) (2012)

Sport
- Country: Australia
- Sport: Diving
- Event: 10 m platform diver
Medal record
Representing Australia
Women's Diving
Olympic Games 2012
Silver medal – second place	2012 London	10 m platform

Brittany Broben (born 23 November 1995) is an Australian former diver. She won a silver medal at the 2012 London Olympics in the 10 m platform diving event with a score of 366.50, behind Chen Ruolin of China

== Personal ==
Nicknamed Britt, Broben was born on 23 November 1995 in Gold Coast, Queensland. She grew up in the Gold Coast of Queensland and still lives there as of June 2012. Brittany was a student at Marymount College, located in Burleigh Heads.

Broben is 160 centimetres (63 in) tall and weighs 48 kilograms (106 lb).

== Diving ==
Broben is a 10 m platform diver. She has a diving scholarship with the Australian Institute of Sport. She trains at the Brisbane Aquatic Centre. As of 2012, she is coached by Xiangning Chen.

At the 2008 Australian Open Championships, Broben earned first place in the 1 m and 3 m springboard events. At the 2009 Australian Junior Elite Championships, she finished first in the 10-metre platform. At the 2009 British Junior Elite Championships, she finished first in the 3-metre platform, second in the 10-metre platform and synchronised platform, and bronze in the 1 metre. At the 2010 World Junior Championships in Fort Lauderdale, she came in second in the Girls B 10 metre platform event. At the 2010 Australian Open Championships, she finished first in the 10-metre platform. She competed in the 2011 FINA World Championships. That year, she competed at the 10-metre platform at the USA Grand Prix, Fort Lauderdale, where she won a gold medal. She went on to earn a bronze medal at the 2011 Australian Open Championships in the 10-metre platform. She earned second place at the 2012 Australian Diving Championships in the 10 m platform.

At the 2012 London Olympics, Broben won a silver medal in the 10 m platform diving event. She was sixteen years old at the time of the Games. Going into the Olympics, her training schedule started at 4:15am, where she and a parent would drive from the family home on the Gold Coast to the Brisbane Aquatic Centre where she trained.

In October 2016, Broben announced her retirement from diving at the age of 20, due to a shoulder injury.

In June 2018 she announced that after undergoing 3 shoulder surgeries, she intends to return to platform diving.
