= Diving at the 2008 Summer Olympics – Women's 3 metre springboard =

Women's 3 metre springboard at the Games of the XXIX Olympiad
- Date: 15–17 August

Medalists
1st place, gold medalist(s)		Guo Jingjing	China
2nd place, silver medalist(s)		Julia Pakhalina	Russia
3rd place, bronze medalist(s)		Wu Minxia	China

Women's 3 meter springboard competition at the Beijing 2008 Summer Olympics was held from August 15 to August 17, at the Beijing National Aquatics Center. It is an individual diving competition, with dives performed from a flexible springboard three meters above the surface of the water.

The individual diving competitions all consist of three rounds. In the first, the 30 divers each perform five dives. The top 18 divers advance to the semifinals. Each diver again performs five dives, and the top 12 divers from among those dives advance to the finals. Preliminary scores are ignored at this point, as only the semifinal scores are considered in advancement. In the final round, the divers perform a final set of five dives, with the scores from those dives (and only those dives) used to determine final ranking.

Seven judges evaluate each dive, giving the diver a score between 0 and 10 with increments of 0.5; scores below 7.0 or above 9.5 are rare. The highest and lowest score from each judge are dropped. The remaining five scores are summed, multiplied by 0.6, and multiplied by the degree of difficulty of the dive to give the total score for the dive. Scores from each dive in the round are summed to give the round score.

== Results ==
Rank	Diver	Country	Preliminary		Semifinal		Final
Rank	Diver	Country	Points	Rank	Points	Rank	Points
1st place, gold medalist(s)	Guo Jingjing	China	373.90	1	398.55	1	415.35
2nd place, silver medalist(s)	Yulia Pakhalina	Russia	358.15	2	383.50	2	398.60
3rd place, bronze medalist(s)	Wu Minxia	China	349.45	4	345.30	3	389.85
4	Blythe Hartley	Canada	350.60	3	324.60	10	374.60
5	Tania Cagnotto	Italy	332.90	6	332.40	5	349.20
6	Anna Lindberg	Sweden	294.75	12	324.70	9	342.15
7	Sharleen Stratton	Australia	288.00	13	325.90	8	331.00
8	Nancilea Foster	United States	300.15	11	338.90	4	316.70
9	Christina Loukas	United States	312.60	8	329.00	7	315.70
10	Laura Sánchez	Mexico	334.35	5	314.40	12	312.25
11	Olena Fedorova	Ukraine	323.75	7	329.10	6	298.40
12	Nóra Barta	Hungary	276.15	18	318.15	11	269.25
13	Jennifer Abel	Canada	300.75	10	296.10	13	Did not advance
14	Chantelle Newbery	Australia	284.85	15	294.45	14	Did not advance
15	Ditte Kotzian	Germany	282.80	16	292.25	15	Did not advance
16	Jashia Luna	Mexico	276.85	17	287.35	16	Did not advance
17	Maria Marconi	Italy	286.10	14	277.50	17	Did not advance
18	Katja Dieckow	Germany	302.70	9	263.00	18	Did not advance
19	Svetlana Filippova	Russia	274.20	19	did not advance		
20	Diana Isabel Pineda	Colombia	268.85	20	did not advance		
21	Elizabeth Jimie	Malaysia	253.50	21	did not advance		
21	Leong Mun Yee	Malaysia	253.50	21	did not advance		
23	Sheila Mae Perez	Philippines	251.15	23	did not advance		
24	Villő Kormos	Hungary	247.95	24	did not advance		
25	Rebecca Gallantree	Great Britain	232.75	25	did not advance		
26	Hanna Pysmenska	Ukraine	223.50	26	did not advance		
27	Veronika Kratochwil	Austria	218.75	27	did not advance		
28	Jenna Dreyer	South Africa	210.90	28	did not advance		
29	Darya Romenskaya	Belarus	207.00	29	did not advance		
30	Jenifer Benitez	Spain	194.05	30	did not advance		
