= Diving at the 2000 Summer Olympics – Women's 10 metre platform =

Women's 10 metre platform at the Games of the XXVII Olympiad
- Venue: Sydney International Aquatic Centre
- Date: 22 September 2000 (Preliminary); 24 September 2000 (Semi finals & Finals)
- Competitors: 40 from 24 nations

Medalists
1st place, gold medalist(s)		Laura Wilkinson	United States
2nd place, silver medalist(s)		Li Na	China
3rd place, bronze medalist(s)		Anne Montminy	Canada

The women's 10 metre platform was one of eight diving events included in the Diving at the 2000 Summer Olympics programme.

The competition was split into three phases:

Preliminary round
22 September — Each diver performed five dives out of a group consisting of a front dive, a back dive, a reverse dive, an inward dive, a twisting dive and an armstand dive. There were no limitations in degree of difficulty. The 18 divers with the highest total score advanced to the semi-final.
Semi-final
24 September — Each diver performed four dives out of a group consisting of a front dive, a back dive, a reverse dive, an inward dive, a twisting dive and an armstand dive, all limited in difficulty degree. The 12 divers with the highest combined score from the semi-final and preliminary dives advanced to the final.
Final
24 September — Each diver performed five dives out of a group consisting of a front dive, a back dive, a reverse dive, an inward dive, a twisting dive and an armstand dive. The final ranking was determined by the combined score from the final and semi-final dives.

== Results ==
Rank	Diver	Nation	Preliminary		Semifinal				Final		
Rank	Diver	Nation	Points	Rank	Points	Rank	Total	Rank	Points	Rank	Total
1st place, gold medalist(s)	Laura Wilkinson	United States	331.20	5	173.04	8	504.24	5	370.71	1	543.75
2nd place, silver medalist(s)	Li Na	China	366.66	2	196.23	1	562.89	2	345.78	3	542.01
3rd place, bronze medalist(s)	Anne Montminy	Canada	339.93	3	185.88	3	525.81	3	354.27	2	540.15
4	Sang Xue	China	374.79	1	196.11	2	570.90	1	316.92	6	513.03
5	Émilie Heymans	Canada	333.78	4	182.64	5	516.42	4	329.28	4	511.92
6	Olena Zhupina	Ukraine	304.65	9	173.16	7	477.81	8	315.93	7	489.09
7	Anja Richter-Libiseller	Austria	314.31	6	168.78	10	483.09	7	313.38	8	482.16
8	Svetlana Timoshinina	Russia	309.21	7	160.47	15	469.68	9	318.42	5	478.89
9	Natalya Chikina	Kazakhstan	296.58	10	162.27	14	458.85	12	304.53	9	466.80
10	Choe Myong-hwa	North Korea	308.73	8	183.84	4	492.57	6	269.22	11	453.06
11	Rebecca Gilmore	Australia	288.99	12	175.92	6	464.91	10	273.03	10	448.95
12	Ute Wetzig	Germany	289.38	11	169.77	9	459.15	11	268.47	12	438.24
13	Sara Reiling	United States	282.84	16	164.07	12	446.91	13	did not advance		
14	Dolores Sáez	Spain	283.41	15	163.11	13	446.52	14	did not advance		
15	Irina Vyguzova	Kazakhstan	284.52	14	157.17	16	441.69	15	did not advance		
16	Yevgeniya Olshevskaya	Russia	271.05	18	166.98	11	438.03	16	did not advance		
17	Hsieh Pei-hua	Chinese Taipei	284.91	13	126.66	18	411.57	17	did not advance		
18	Angelique Rodríguez	Puerto Rico	273.36	17	134.94	17	408.30	18	did not advance		
19	Juliana Veloso	Brazil	266.04	19	did not advance						
20	Ditte Kotzian	Germany	265.32	20	did not advance						
21	Clara Elena Ciocan	Romania	265.29	21	did not advance						
22	Ri Ok-rim	North Korea	262.20	22	did not advance						
23	Odile Arboles-Souchon	France	260.25	23	did not advance						
24	Loudy Tourky	Australia	257.40	24	did not advance						
25	Sally Freeman	Great Britain	256.17	25	did not advance						
26	Nana Nebieridze	Georgia	252.09	26	did not advance						
27	Leire Santos	Spain	247.41	27	did not advance						
28	Lesley Ward	Great Britain	238.65	28	did not advance						
29	Eftihia Pappa	Greece	236.79	29	did not advance						
30	María Alcalá	Mexico	235.53	30	did not advance						
31	Yolanda Ortiz	Cuba	231.63	31	did not advance						
32	Svitlana Serbina	Ukraine	230.64	32	did not advance						
33	Azul Almazán	Mexico	229.29	33	did not advance						
34	Leong Mun Yee	Malaysia	227.28	34	did not advance						
35	Claire Febvay	France	222.81	35	did not advance						
36	Anişoara Oprea	Romania	221.82	36	did not advance						
37	Marion Reiff	Austria	206.57	37	did not advance						
38	Maria Konstantatou	Greece	189.57	38	did not advance						
39	Choi Hye-jin	South Korea	187.17	39	did not advance						
40	Shenny Ratna Amelia	Indonesia	170.07	40	did not advance						

== Sources ==
- Sydney Organising Committee for the Olympic Games (SOCOG) (2001). Official Report of the XXVII Olympiad - Volume Three: Results (Diving) (pdf) (in English and French). Sydney: Sydney Organising Committee for the Olympic Games (SOCOG). pp. 74–85. ISBN 0-9579616-1-8. OCLC 49687523.
