= Lynda Folauhola =

Australian diver

Personal information
- Full name: Lynda Mary Folauhola
- Born: 6 October 1980 (age 45) Adelaide, South Australia
- Height: 160 cm (5 ft 3 in)
- Weight: 60 kg (132 lb)

Sport
- Sport: Diving
Medal record
Representing Australia
World Championships
Silver medal – second place	2003 Barcelona	10 m synchronised platform

Lynda Mary Folauhola (born 6 October 1980), also known as Lynda Dackiw, is a former Australian diver. In 2003, partnered with Loudy Tourky, she finished with a silver medal at the 2003 World Aquatics Championships. Again paired with Tourky, she competed at the 2004 Summer Olympics in the synchronised 10 metre platform event where the duo finished 4th. She also took part in the 1998 Commonwealth Games.
