= Sally Freeman =

British diver

Personal information
- Nationality: British
- Born: 20 February 1974 (age 51); Plymouth, England

Sport
- Sport: Diving

Sally Freeman (born 20 February 1974) is a British diver. She competed in the women's 10 metre platform event at the 2000 Summer Olympics.
