= Diving at the 2004 Summer Olympics – Women's synchronized 10 metre platform =

Women's synchronized 10 metre platform at the Games of the XXVIII Olympiad

Medalists
1st place, gold medalist(s)		Lao Lishi, Li Ting	China
2nd place, silver medalist(s)		Natalia Goncharova, Yulia Koltunova	Russia
3rd place, bronze medalist(s)		Blythe Hartley, Émilie Heymans	Canada

The women's synchronized 10 meter platform was one of eight diving events included in the Diving at the 2004 Summer Olympics program.

The competition was held as an outright final:

Final
16 August — Each pair of divers performed five dives freely chosen from the five diving groups, with two dives limited to a 2.0 degree of difficulty and the others without limitation. Divers could perform different dives during the same dive if both presented the same difficulty degree. The final ranking was determined by the score attained by the pair after all five dives had been performed.

== Results ==
Rank	Nation	Dives					Total
Rank	Nation	1	2	3	4	5	Total
1st place, gold medalist(s)	China; Lao Lishi; Li Ting	53.40	58.20	82.80	71.04	86.70	352.14
2nd place, silver medalist(s)	Russia; Natalia Goncharova; Yulia Koltunova	46.20	52.80	75.60	80.64	85.68	340.92
3rd place, bronze medalist(s)	Canada; Blythe Hartley; Émilie Heymans	49.80	49.20	76.50	76.80	75.48	327.78
4	Australia; Lynda Folauhola; Loudy Tourky	48.00	47.40	66.60	69.30	82.62	313.92
5	Mexico; Jashia Luna; Paola Espinosa	46.80	48.60	73.80	73.26	65.28	307.74
6	Germany; Annett Gamm; Nora Subschinski	48.60	49.80	76.50	61.20	67.20	303.30
7	United States; Cassandra Cardinell; Sara Hildebrand	31.80	50.40	68.16	71.28	80.56	302.22
8	Greece; Eftihia Pappa; Florentia Sfakianou	47.40	49.20	67.20	52.44	56.16	272.40

== Sources ==
- "Diving Results". Athens 2004 Summer Olympics. Yahoo!.
- Diving. Official Report of the XXVIII Olympiad - Results
