= Nana Nebieridze =

Georgian diver

Personal information
- Nationality: Georgian
- Born: 21 June 1975 (age 49)

Sport
- Sport: Diving

Nana Nebieridze (born 21 June 1975) is a Georgian diver. She competed in the women's 10 metre platform event at the 2000 Summer Olympics.
