= Mary Beth Dunnichay =

American platform diver

Personal information
- Born: February 25, 1993 (age 33) Elwood, Indiana, U.S.
- Height: 5 ft 0 in (1.52 m)

Sport
- Country: United States
- Event(s): 10m, 10m synchro
- College team: Purdue University
- Club: National Training Center
- Partner: Anna James
- Former partner: Haley Ishimatsu
- Coached by: John Wingfield
Medal record
Women's diving
Representing United States
World Championships
Silver medal – second place	2009 Rome	10m synchro platform
Pan American Games
Bronze medal – third place	2007 Rio de Janeiro	10m platform synchro

Mary Beth Dunnichay (born February 25, 1993, in Elwood, Indiana) is an American platform diver. Her older brother Caleb is also a competitive diver for Auburn University.

She was named to the 2008 U.S. Olympic team in both the 10-meter platform and the synchronized 10-meter platform event with Haley Ishimatsu. In the synchronized competition Ishimatsu and Dunnichay earned fifth place scoring 309.12.

In May 2012, the city of Elwood, Indiana, Dunnichay's hometown, renamed their city pool Mary Beth Dunnichay Aquatic Center.
