= Diving at the 2008 Summer Olympics – Women's synchronized 10 metre platform =

Women's synchronized 10-metre platform at the Games of the XXIX Olympiad
- Venue: Beijing National Aquatics Center
- Date: 12 August

Medalists
1st place, gold medalist(s)		Wang Xin; Chen Ruolin	China
2nd place, silver medalist(s)		Briony Cole; Melissa Wu	Australia
3rd place, bronze medalist(s)		Paola Espinosa; Tatiana Ortiz	Mexico

The women's synchronized 10-meter platform competition at the Beijing 2008 Summer Olympics took place on August 12 at the Beijing National Aquatics Center.

Like all other synchronized diving competitions at the Olympics, only one round of competition was held. Eight pairs of divers competed. Each pair performed five dives, with both divers from the pair diving at the same time.

Nine judges evaluated each dive, with two each judging the performance of the two divers (the execution judges) and five judges evaluating the synchronization of the pair (the synchronization judges). For each dive, four of the nine scores are ignored—the highest and lowest execution scores and the highest and lowest synchronization scores. The remaining five scores are summed, multiplied by the dive's degree of difficulty, and then multiplied by 0.6 to get a final score for the dive.

== Results ==
Rank	Nation	Dives					Total
Rank	Nation	1	2	3	4	5	Total
1st place, gold medalist(s)	China; Wang Xin; Chen Ruolin	55.80	55.20	79.20	82.56	90.78	363.54
2nd place, silver medalist(s)	Australia; Briony Cole; Melissa Wu	51.00	53.40	72.00	71.04	87.72	335.16
3rd place, bronze medalist(s)	Mexico; Paola Espinosa; Tatiana Ortiz	46.80	48.60	77.76	73.26	83.64	330.06
4	Germany; Annett Gamm; Nora Subschinski	50.40	49.80	69.12	60.39	80.58	310.29
5	United States; Mary Beth Dunnichay; Haley Ishimatsu	51.00	51.00	60.30	66.24	80.58	309.12
6	North Korea; Choe Kum-Hui; Kim Un-Hyang	53.40	51.60	61.20	63.36	78.54	308.10
7	Canada; Meaghan Benfeito; Roseline Filion	51.00	51.60	67.50	62.37	73.44	305.91
8	Great Britain; Tonia Couch; Stacie Powell	51.00	48.60	66.60	63.84	73.44	303.48
