= Maria Konstantatou =

Greek diver (born 1981)

Personal information
- Nationality: Greek
- Born: 3 February 1981 (age 44)

Sport
- Sport: Diving

Maria Konstantatou (born 3 February 1981) is a Greek diver. She competed in the women's 10 metre platform event at the 2000 Summer Olympics.
