= Anja Richter =

Austrian diver

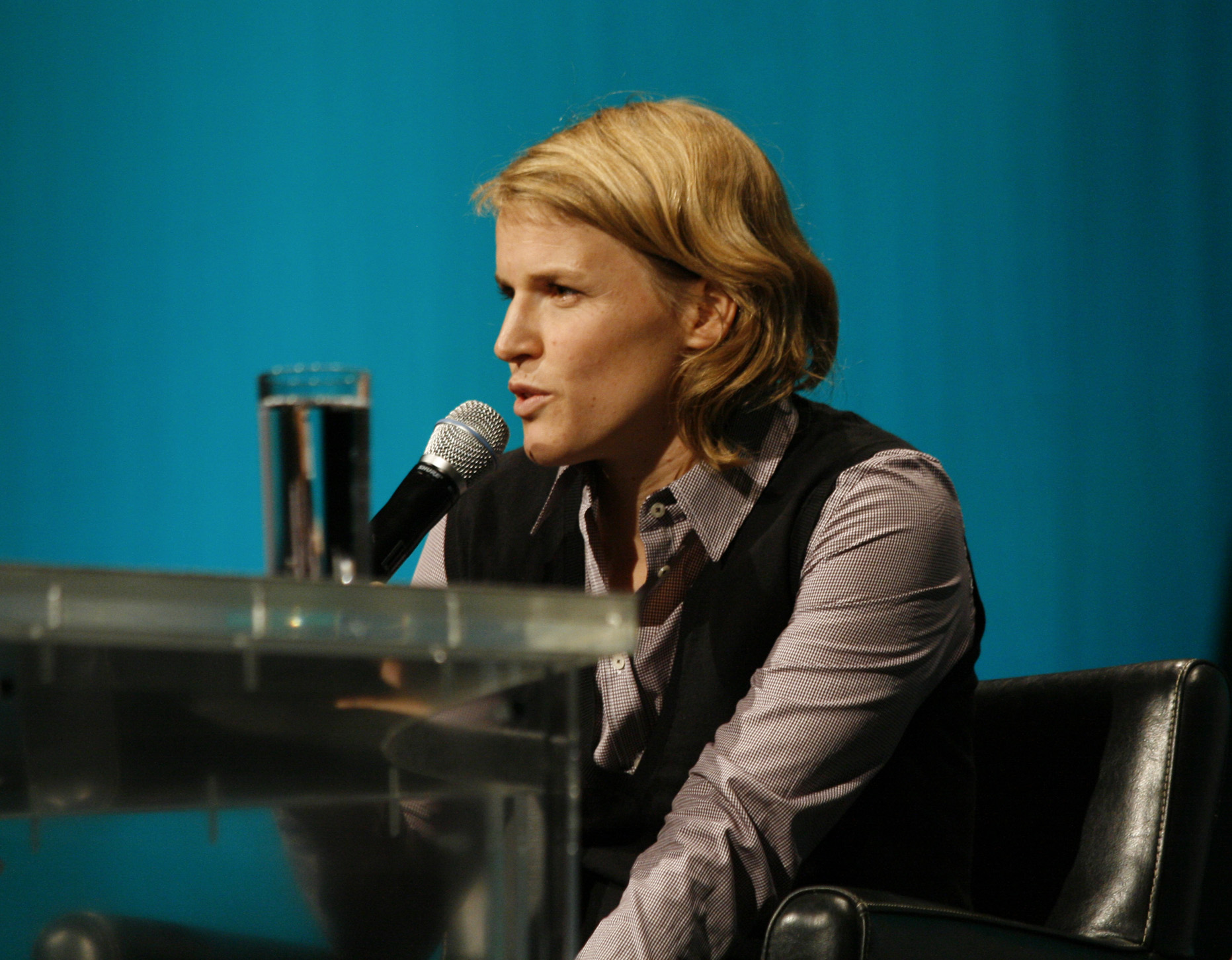

Personal information
- Full name: Anja Richter-Libiseller
- Nationality: Austrian
- Born: 5 October 1977 (age 48) Vienna, Austria
- Height: 1.72 m (5 ft 7 1/2 in)
- Weight: 62 kg (137 lb)

Sport
- Sport: Diving
- Event(s): 10 m, 10 m synchro
- Club: Schwimm-Union Wien
- Partner: Marion Reiff
- Coached by: Michael Worisch
Medal record
Women's diving
Representing Austria
European Championships
Silver medal – second place	2006 Budapest	10 m platform
Bronze medal – third place	1997 Seville	10 m synchro

Anja Richter-Libiseller (born 5 October 1977) is an Austrian platform diver. She is a four-time Olympian (1996, 2000, 2004, and 2008), and a multiple-time Austrian diving champion in her respective discipline. Richter is also the sister of Jürgen Richter, a springboard diver who competed at the 1992 Summer Olympics in Barcelona, and the granddaughter of Liesl Perkaus, a multiple-time Austrian track and field champion, and a discus thrower who competed at the 1928 Summer Olympics in Amsterdam.

== Diving career ==
At age nineteen, Richter made her official debut for the 1996 Summer Olympics in Atlanta, where she placed eleventh in the women's platform, with a score of 408.45.

At the 2000 Summer Olympics in Sydney, Richter achieved her best diving career result, with a seventh-place finish, in the women's platform, posting a total score of 313.38. She also teamed up with her partner Marion Reiff in the women's synchronized platform, but narrowly missed out of an Olympic medal by seven points behind the Australian team (Rebecca Gilmore and Loudy Tourky), recording their final score at 294.00.

At the 2004 Summer Olympics in Athens, Richter, however, fell short in her bid for a twelve-woman final, when she finished fifteenth in the women's platform by six points behind Germany's Annett Gamm, with a total score of 472.44.

In 2006, Richter reached her breakthrough season in diving, when she won a silver medal for the same discipline at the European Aquatics Championships in Budapest, Hungary, accumulating a score of 332.35 points. She also achieved a fifth-place finish at the FINA Diving World Cup series in Changshu, China, by one point ahead of Canada's Marie-Ève Marleau, with a total score of 331.65.

Twelve years after competing in her first Olympics, Richter qualified for her fourth Austrian team, as a 30-year-old, at the 2008 Summer Olympics in Beijing. She placed twenty-second out of twenty-nine divers in the preliminary round of the women's platform event, by two points behind France's Audrey Labeau, with a total score of 287.70. Shortly after the Olympics, Richter announced her retirement from the diving career to work as a lecturer and officer for the Ministry of National Defense and Sport.
