= Darya Romenskaya =

Belarusian Olympic diver

Personal information
- Nationality: Belarus
- Born: 10 March 1983 (age 43) Hrodna, Byelorussian SSR, Soviet Union
- Height: 1.62 m (5 ft 4 in)
- Weight: 56 kg (123 lb)

Sport
- Sport: Diving
- Event: Springboard
- Club: BSKP Hrodna (BLR)

Darya Romenskaya (Belarusian: Дар'я Роменская; born March 10, 1983, in Hrodna) is a female Belarusian springboard diver. Romenskaya represented Belarus at the 2008 Summer Olympics in Beijing, where she competed for the women's springboard event. She placed twenty-ninth in the preliminary rounds, with a score of 207.00 points, after six successive attempts.
