= Ramona Maria Ciobanu =

Romanian diver

Personal information
- Nationality: Romania
- Born: 4 September 1984 (age 41)
- Height: 1.60 m (5 ft 3 in)
- Weight: 50 kg (110 lb)

Sport
- Sport: Diving
- Event: Platform
- Club: CS Triumf Bucuresti
- Coached by: Tiu Claudia

Ramona Maria Ciobanu (born September 4, 1984) is a Romanian platform diver. She is also a member of CS Triumf Bucuresti Diving Club in Bucharest, and is coached and trained by Tiu Claudia.

At age nineteen, Ciobanu made her official debut for the 2004 Summer Olympics in Athens, where she competed for the women's platform event. She placed twenty-fourth out of thirty-four divers in the preliminary round, with a total score of 268.23.

At the 2008 Summer Olympics in Beijing, Ciobanu competed for the second time in the women's platform, where she scored 279.10 points in the preliminary competition, finishing again in twenty-fourth place.
