= Jenna Dreyer =

South African diver

Personal information
- Full name: Jenna Louise Dreyer
- Nationality: South Africa
- Born: 7 February 1986 (age 40) Port Elizabeth, South Africa
- Height: 1.58 m (5 ft 2 in)
- Weight: 57 kg (126 lb)

Sport
- Sport: Diving
- Event(s): Springboard, platform
- Club: Neptune Diving (RSA)
- Team: University of Miami (U.S.)
- Coached by: Randy Ableman (USA)

Jenna Louise Dreyer (born 7 February 1986 in Port Elizabeth) is a female South African diver, who specialized in springboard and platform events. She is a two-time Olympian, and an honorable All-American mention on the 3 m springboard and 10 m platform, while residing in the United States.

== Early life and education ==
Dreyer was born in Port Elizabeth, South Africa on 7 February 1986. At age 15, she left South Africa for Canada to train to compete as an Olympic diver. In Canada, she trained with a diving coach at Boardwalks Club in Victoria, British Columbia. She was homeschooled in order to satisfy South African curriculum, and received her high school diploma in South Africa.

== Diving career ==
=== University of Miami ===
After her three-year stay in Canada, Dreyer attended the University of Miami in Coral Gables, Florida, where she continued training as a diver and become a member of the Miami Hurricanes women's diving team under head coach Randy Ableman. While attending at the University of Miami, Dreyer received Atlantic Coast Conference (ACC) "Diving of the Year" honors, and an honorable All-American mention on the 3 m springboard and 10 m platform. She graduated from the University of Miami with a bachelor's degree in elementary education.

=== 2004 Summer Olympics ===
At age seventeen, Dreyer participated in the 2004 Summer Olympics in Athens, representing South Africa. She reached the semi-finals of the |women's springboard event, where she was able to perform an astonishing dive with a total score of 464.43, finishing only in seventeenth place. She also competed for the women's platform, finishing in 34th place for the preliminary rounds, with a score of 186.90.

=== 2006 Commonwealth Games ===
At the 2006 Commonwealth Games in Melbourne, Dreyer narrowly lost the bronze medal to Australia's Kathryn Blackshaw, after finishing fourth in the women's springboard final. She also made her major international debut in diving at the 2007 FINA World Championships, where she registered a score of 250.90 for a thirteenth-place finish in one-metre springboard, and 262.50 for a twenty-third finish in three-metre springboard.

=== 2008 Summer Olympics ===
Dreyer qualified for the second time in the women's springboard at the 2008 Summer Olympics in Beijing, by receiving a ticket from the FINA World Diving Cup. During the competition, Dreyer appeared to falter as she bounced on the end of the board, but was farther into her dive to stop. She eventually bounded up into a forward three and a half somersault that she did not quite have a momentum to complete. Following a disastrous performance on her springboard dive, and a zero score from the judges, Dreyer finished the preliminary rounds only in twenty-eighth place, with a score of 210.90.
