= Pandelela Rinong =

Malaysian diver (born 1993)

Yang Berbahagia Dato Pandelela Rinong PSBS JBK AMN OLY
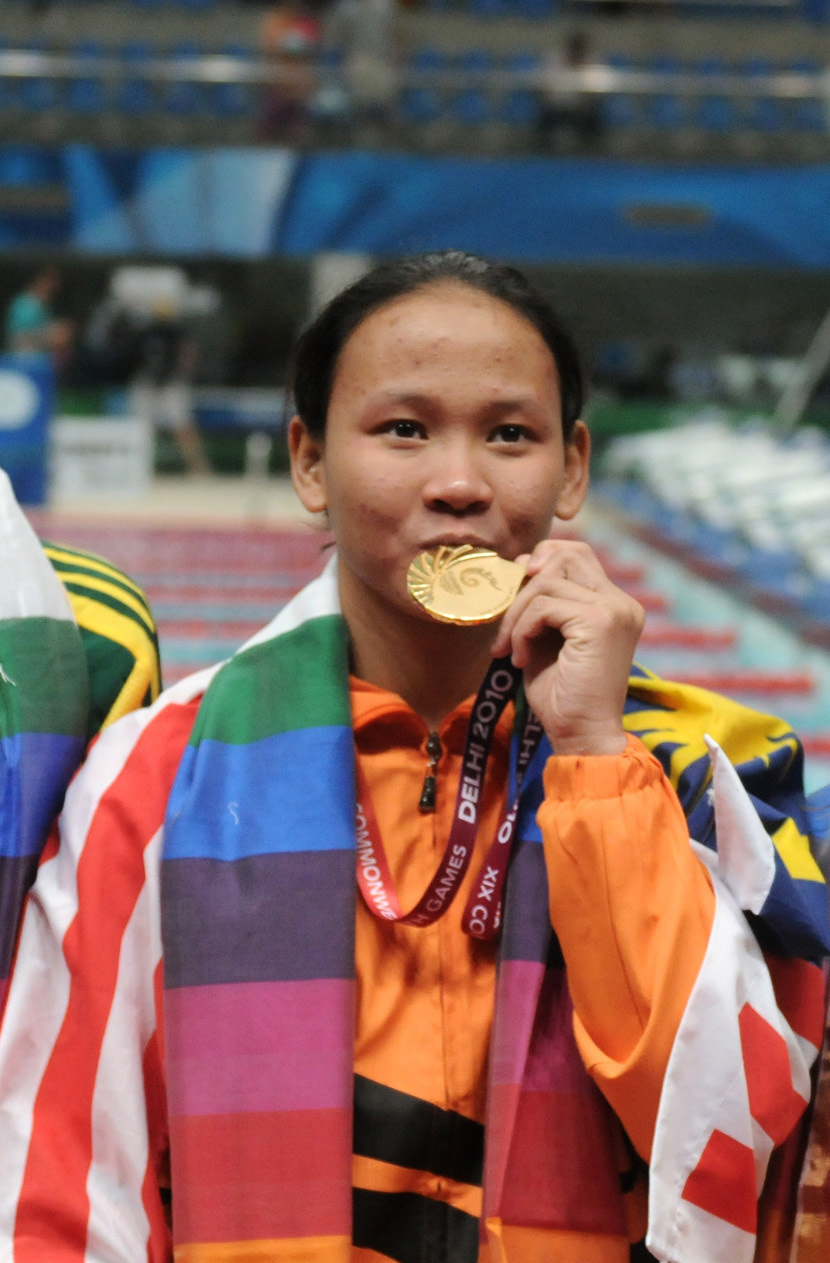
- Pandelela at the 2010 Commonwealth Games

Personal information
- Full name: Pandelela Rinong anak Pamg
- Nationality: Malaysian
- Born: 2 March 1993 (age 33) Bau, Sarawak, Malaysia
- Height: 1.62 m (5 ft 4 in)
- Website: pandelela.my

Sport
- Country: Malaysia
- Events: 3 m, 10 m, 10 m synchro
- Club: Majlis Sukan Negara
Medal record
Representing Malaysia
Olympic Games
Silver medal – second place	2016 Rio de Janeiro	10 m synchro
Bronze medal – third place	2012 London	10 m platform
World Championships
Silver medal – second place	2019 Gwangju	10 m synchro
Bronze medal – third place	2009 Rome	10 m synchro
Bronze medal – third place	2013 Barcelona	10 m synchro
Bronze medal – third place	2015 Kazan	10 m platform
Bronze medal – third place	2017 Budapest	10 m synchro
Bronze medal – third place	2022 Budapest	10 m platform
Bronze medal – third place	2022 Budapest	10 m synchro
FINA Diving World Cup
Gold medal – first place	2021 Tokyo	10 m platform
Silver medal – second place	2016 Rio de Janeiro	10 m synchro
Bronze medal – third place	2018 Wuhan	10 m platform
Youth Olympic Games
Silver medal – second place	2010 Singapore	10 m platform
Silver medal – second place	2010 Singapore	3 m springboard
Asian Games
Silver medal – second place	2010 Guangzhou	10 m synchro
Bronze medal – third place	2010 Guangzhou	10 m platform
Bronze medal – third place	2014 Incheon	10 m synchro
Bronze medal – third place	2022 Hangzhou	10 m synchro
Bronze medal – third place	2022 Hangzhou	10 m platform
Commonwealth Games
Gold medal – first place	2010 New Delhi	10 m platform
Gold medal – first place	2018 Gold Coast	10 m synchro
Silver medal – second place	2010 New Delhi	10 m synchro
Silver medal – second place	2014 Glasgow	10 m platform
Bronze medal – third place	2014 Glasgow	10 m synchro
Southeast Asian Games
Gold medal – first place	2007 Nakhon Ratchasima	10 m synchro
Gold medal – first place	2009 Vientiane	10 m platform
Gold medal – first place	2009 Vientiane	10 m synchro
Gold medal – first place	2011 Palembang	10 m platform
Gold medal – first place	2013 Naypyidaw	10 m platform
Gold medal – first place	2015 Singapore	10 m platform
Gold medal – first place	2017 Kuala Lumpur	10 m platform
Gold medal – first place	2017 Kuala Lumpur	Team
Gold medal – first place	2021 Hanoi	10 m synchro
Silver medal – second place	2007 Nakhon Ratchasima	10 m platform
Universiade
Silver medal – second place	2011 Shenzhen	10 m platform
Bronze medal – third place	2011 Shenzhen	Team
Bronze medal – third place	2011 Shenzhen	10 m synchro

Dato Pandelela Rinong anak Pamg (born 2 March 1993) is a Malaysian diver. She has won two Olympic medals and seven World Championships medals.

Pandelela represented Malaysia at the 2008 Summer Olympics where she finished 27th in the 10m platform event. She won the gold medal at the 2010 Commonwealth Games. She was chosen to be the flagbearer of Malaysia at the 2012 Summer Olympics. She went on to win the bronze medal in the 10m platform, becoming the first Malaysian female athlete to win an Olympic medal, as well as the first in any sport other than badminton. At the 2016 Summer Olympics, she won the silver medal in the 10m synchronized platform with Cheong Jun Hoong.

== Early and personal life ==
Pandelela was born in (Kampung) Kupuo Jugan, a Bidayuh village in Bau, Sarawak to Hartini Lamim and Pamg Joheng. She is of Bidayuh ethnicity, a Bumiputera native to the Malaysian state of Sarawak. She is the second of four siblings. At the age of seven she was selected as a state diver and continued her training at the Bukit Jalil Sports School. She graduated from the University of Malaya in 2018, majoring in Sports Management Science.

Pandelela speaks Mandarin; which she learned from attending SJK(C) Stampin - a Chinese national-type primary school, as well as her Bidayuh mother tongue, Malay and English.

== Career ==
Pandelela made her international competition debut in 2007 at the Asian Junior Aquatics Championships where she won four gold medals. At the 2007 Southeast Asian Games in Thailand, she won the gold medal in the 10m synchronized platform with Cheong Jun Hoong.

Pandelela made her Olympic debut at the 2008 Beijing Olympics as a 15-year-old. She finished 27th in the 10 m platform. At the 2009 World Aquatics Championships, she finished fifth in the 10 m platform. She went on to win the bronze medal in the 10 m synchronized platform with Leong Mun Yee where it was also the first-ever diving medal for Malaysia at the World Championships.

Pandelela won two gold medals at the 2009 Southeast Asian Games in Vientiane. She was the Malaysian national flag bearer at the 2010 Summer Youth Olympics in Singapore where she won silver medals in the 10 m platform and 3 m springboard events.

At the 2010 Commonwealth Games in New Delhi, she won Malaysia's first Commonwealth Games gold medal in an aquatic sport by winning the 10 m platform event. At the 2010 Asian Games in Guangzhou, she won the bronze medal in 10 m platform and the silver medal in 10m synchronized platform with Leong Mun Yee.

Pandelela was Team Malaysia's national flag bearer at the 2012 Summer Olympics opening ceremony, the first Malaysian Olympic female athlete to be accorded the honour. She competed in the individual 10 m platform, 3m synchronized springboard with Cheong Jun Hoong and the 10 m synchronised platform event with Leong Mun Yee.

She became the first Malaysian female athlete to win an Olympics medal, and the first Malaysian athlete to win an Olympics medal in a sport besides badminton by winning a bronze medal in the 10 m platform at the 2012 Summer Olympics in London. To commemorate her success, she was presented with the Johan Bintang Kenyalang (Companion of the Order of the Star of Hornbill) by the Sarawak State Government, in a special investiture ceremony held at the Astana shortly after her triumphant return to her homeland. She became Sarawak's first athlete to be accorded with the award.

At the 2013 World Aquatics Championships in Barcelona, Pandelela and Mun Yee clinched the bronze medal in the 10m synchronized platform event with 331.14 points. She also finished sixth in the individual 10m platform event. At the 2013 Southeast Asian Games in Naypyidaw, she retained her gold medal in the 10m platform event.

Pandelela competed at the 2014 Commonwealth Games in Glasgow. Despite a knee injury, she won the bronze medal in the 10m synchronized platform with Nur Dhabitah Sabri. She also bagged a silver in the 10m platform with a score of 368.55 points. At the 2014 Asian Games in Incheon, she won the bronze medal in 10 m synchro platform with Leong Mun Yee.

In July 2015, Pandelela made history when she became the first Malaysian to finish on the podium in an individual event at the World Aquatics Championships. She clinched a bronze medal in the individual 10 m platform in Kazan and qualified for the 2016 Rio de Janeiro Olympics in Brazil.

At the 2016 Summer Olympics in Rio de Janeiro, she won the silver medal in the 10 m synchronized platform with Cheong Jun Hoong, becoming the first Malaysian women's team to win a silver medal at the Olympics. In honour of her achievement at the 2016 Summer Olympics, the Sarawak Aquatic Centre in Petra Jaya, Sarawak was officially renamed the Pandelela Rinong Aquatic Centre. After 2016 Summer Olympics, Pandelela took a break to recuperate from back and shoulder injuries.

At the 2017 World Aquatics Championships in Budapest, she won the bronze medal in the 10 m synchronized platform with Cheong Jun Hoong. She finished ninth in the individual 10m platform which was won by her partner, Jun Hoong. At the 2017 Southeast Asian Games in Kuala Lumpur, she won the gold medal in a newly introduced team event with Gabriel Gilbert Daim. She also retained her gold medal in the individual 10m platform event.

At the 2021 FINA Diving World Cup in Tokyo, Japan, she won the gold medal in the individual 10 m platform. She placed fourth in the synchronized 10 m platform together with Leong Mun Yee.

At the 2020 Summer Olympics in Tokyo, Pandelela and her diving partner Leong Mun Yee finished eighth in the women's 10m synchronized platform.

== Awards ==
- SAM-100PLUS Best Athlete: 2010, 2012, 2015
- National Sportswoman of the Year: 2011, 2012. 2015, 2021
- Sarawak Sportswoman of the Year: 2010, 2011–12
- NPC-Tan Sri SM Nasimuddin SM Amin 1Malaysian of the Year: 2012
- TM Fans Pick Awards – Glorious Moment: 2015
- Sarawak Sports Youth Icon 2016
- UM Sportswoman of the Year: 2016
- UM Special Badge of University Sports
- Yakult Sports Icon 2017
- Dayak Youth Sports Icon Award 2024 (Sportswoman Category)

== Honours ==
=== Honours of Malaysia ===
- Malaysia
  - Member of the Order of the Defender of the Realm (AMN) (2016)
- Sarawak
  - Commander of the Most Exalted Order of the Star of Sarawak (PSBS) – Dato (2021)
  - Companion of the Order of the Star of Hornbill Sarawak (JBK) (2016)
  - Gold Medal of the Sarawak Independence Diamond Jubilee Medal (2023)

== Controversy ==
In June 2018, Pandelela and six other divers were caught in controversy after a video showed them partying and drinking alcohol during a training camp in Guangzhou, China. The video was allegedly recorded on Chinese New Year's Eve. Following the incident, the Amateur Swimming Union of Malaysia (ASUM) suspended the allowances of the seven national divers with immediate effect with more disciplinary action set to follow. Pandelela and the six other divers apologised publicly and promised the incident will not be repeated. ASUM announced later that no further action will be taken to the seven divers as the divers have already expressed remorse for their actions.

== Legacy ==
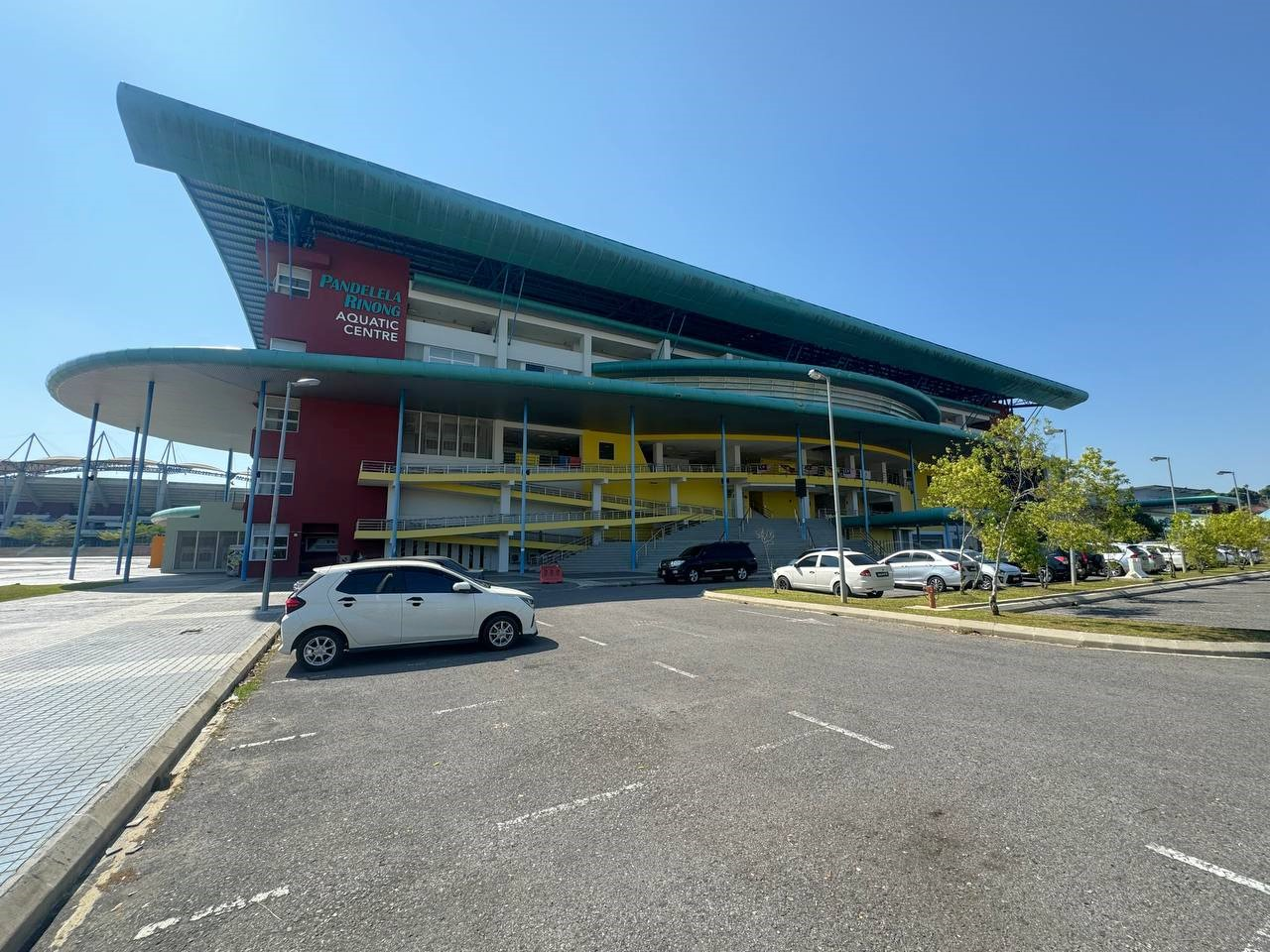
Pandelela Rinong Aquatic Centre.

Several places and honours were named after her, including:

- Sarawak Aquatic Centre in Petra Jaya, Kuching was officially renamed the Pandelela Rinong Aquatic Centre in 2018.

== Bibliography ==
- Indovino, Shaina (2005). Malaysian Superstars Athletes: Pandelela Rinong. Malaysia: Institut Terjemahan & Buku Malaysia. ISBN 9789674303150.

Olympic Games
Preceded by Azizulhasni Awang	Flagbearer for Malaysia; 2012 London	Succeeded by Lee Chong Wei
