= Monique Gladding =

British diver

Personal information
- Born: 17 June 1981 (age 45) Durban, South Africa

Sport
- Sport: Diving
Medal record
Representing Great Britain
European Championships
Bronze medal – third place	2010 Budapest	10m platform synchro

Monique Gladding (born 17 June 1981) is a South African-born British diver. She competed for Great Britain in the 10 metre platform event at the 2012 Summer Olympics.

She quit her sporting career in September 2012. As of 2025, she is the co-performance director of Canterbury Diving in Christchurch, New Zealand.
