= Open water swimming at the 2009 World Aquatics Championships – Women's 25 km =

Women's 25 km at the 2009 World Aquatics Championships
- Location: Rome
- Dates: 25 July
- Competitors: 18 from 10 nations

The Women's 25 km Open Water swimming race of the 2009 World Aquatics Championships took place on Saturday July 25, at Ostia beach in Rome. 18 women from 10 countries competed. Angela Maurer of Germany took home the gold with a time of 5:47:48.0 just pipping Anna Uvarova at the finish by 3.9 seconds.

== Results ==
Rank	Swimmer	Nationality	Time
1st place, gold medalist(s)	Angela Maurer	Germany	5:47:48.0
2nd place, silver medalist(s)	Anna Uvarova	Russia	5:47:51.9
3rd place, bronze medalist(s)	Federica Vitale	Italy	5:47:52.7
4	Margarita Dominguez	Spain	5:48:37.6
5	Celia Barrot	France	5:49:00.7
6	Linsy Heister	Netherlands	5:49:08.1
7	Martina Grimaldi	Italy	5:49:36.7
8	Stefanie Biller	Germany	5:50:08.8
9	Natalia Pankina	Russia	5:50:36.8
10	Eva Fabian	United States	5:50:41.5
11	Emily Hanson	United States	5:53:01.6
12	Esther Nunez Morera	Spain	6:06:45.7
13	Shelley Clark	Australia	6:07:31.7
14	Cathy Dietrich	France	6:08:27.4
15	Lili Anzueto Moguel	Mexico	6:29:49.1
--	Kate Brookes-Peterson	Australia	DNF
--	Zaira Cardenas	Mexico	DNF
--	Nika Kozamernik	Slovenia	DNS

Key: OTL = Over Time Limit, DSQ = Disqualified, DNF = Did not finish, DNS = Did not start

== See also ==
- Open water swimming at the 2007 World Aquatics Championships – Women's 25 km
