= Nóra Barta =

Hungarian diver

Personal information
- Born: 2 April 1984 (age 42) Budapest, Hungary

Sport
- Sport: Diving
Medal record
Representing Hungary
European Championships
Silver medal – second place	2008 Eindhoven	1 m springboard
Bronze medal – third place	2006 Budapest	3 m springboard
Bronze medal – third place	2010 Budapest	3 m springboard
World Junior Championships
Gold medal – first place	1999 Pardubice	1 m springboard
Silver medal – second place	2002 Aachen	3 m springboard
European Junior Championships
Gold medal – first place	1998 Antwerp	3 m springboard
Gold medal – first place	2000 Istanbul	3 m springboard
Silver medal – second place	1998 Antwerp	1 m springboard
Bronze medal – third place	1999 Aachen	3 m springboard
Bronze medal – third place	2001 Malta	3 m springboard

Nóra Barta (born 2 April 1984) is a Hungarian diver. She won the bronze medal in 3m Springboard event at the 2006 European Aquatics Championships and the silver in 1 m springboard event at the 2008 European Championships in Aquatics.

Barta has competed in four Olympic Summer Games, 2000, 2004, 2008 and 2012. She reached the final and her best result on the 3 m springboard in 2008. She lives and trains in Eindhoven, The Netherlands.
