= Stacie Powell =

British diver

Personal information
- Born: 18 December 1985 (age 40)

Sport
- Sport: Diving

Stacie Linda Powell (born 18 December 1985) is a British diver and astronomer. She represented her country at the 2008 Summer Olympics in Beijing (10 metre platform and synchronized 10 metre platform) and at the 2012 Summer Olympics (10 metre platform). She is also a postgraduate student in astrophysics at the Institute of Astronomy Cambridge, researching FU Orionis. While an undergraduate at the University of Southampton she spent a year abroad working at the Center for Astrophysics | Harvard & Smithsonian.

Powell went to Oxted School and was in Tenchleys house, leaving in 2004. She revisited the school in October 2012 to give a presentation to some astronomy classes.
