= Leyre Eizaguirre =

Spanish diver

Personal information
- Nationality: Spanish
- Born: 12 May 1980 (age 44)

Sport
- Sport: Diving

Leyre Eizaguirre (born 12 May 1980) is a Spanish diver. She competed in the women's 3 metre springboard event at the 2004 Summer Olympics.
