= Elina Eggers =

Swedish platform diver (born 1987)

Personal information
- Full name: Elina Elisabeth Eggers
- Nationality: Swedish
- Born: 12 March 1987 (age 39) Stockholm, Sweden
- Height: 1.64 m (5 ft 4 1/2 in)
- Weight: 56 kg (123 lb)

Sport
- Sport: Diving
- Event: 10 m
- College team: Arizona State Sun Devils (USA)
- Club: SK Neptun (SWE)
Medal record
Women's diving
Representing Sweden
European Championships
Bronze medal – third place	2008 Eindhoven	10 m

Elina Elisabeth Eggers (born 12 March 1987) is a Swedish platform diver. She is a thirteen-time Swedish diving champion, a four-time All-American athlete, and a two-time first-team Pac-10 All-Academic honoree. She also won a bronze medal in the women's platform at the 2008 European Aquatics Championships in Eindhoven, Netherlands, with a score of 319.65, earning her a spot on the Swedish team for the Olympics.

Eggers represented Sweden at the 2008 Summer Olympics in Beijing, where she competed as a lone female diver in the women's platform event. She was ranked sixteenth out of twenty-nine divers in the preliminary rounds, until a much better performance in the semi-finals left Eggers in ninth position, attaining a score of 315.45. Petre, however, finished only in twelfth place by eleven points behind Japan's Mai Nakagawa, with a score of 285.85.

Eggers is also a member of the swimming and diving team for the Arizona State Sun Devils, and an economics graduate at the Arizona State University in Glendale, Arizona.
