= Valentina Marocchi =

Italian diver (born 1983)

Personal information
- Born: 15 December 1983 (age 42) Bolzano, Italy

Sport
- Sport: Diving
Medal record
Representing Italy
European Championships
Bronze medal – third place	2004 Madrid	10m platform
Bronze medal – third place	2004 Madrid	10m platform synchro

Valentina Marocchi (born 15 December 1983) is an Italian diver.

She finished 23rd in the 3 metre springboard event of the 2004 Olympic Games, 32nd in the 10 metre platform event of the 2004 Olympic Games and fifteenth in the 10 metre platform event of the 2008 Olympic Games.
