= Brenda Spaziani =

Italian diver (born 1984)

Personal information
- Born: 2 January 1984 (age 42) Frosinone, Italy

Sport
- Country: Italy
- Sport: Diving
Medal record
Women's diving
Representing Italy
European Championships
Bronze medal – third place	2004 Madrid	10 m synchro

Brenda Spaziani (born 2 January 1984) is an Italian diver. She competed in the 10 metre platform event at the 2012 Summer Olympics.
