= Wang Xin (diver) =

Chinese diver

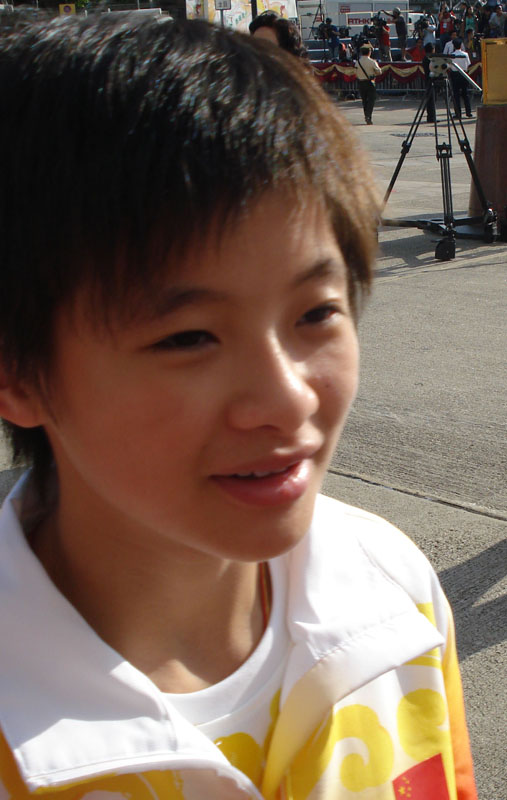

Personal information
- Nationality: China
- Born: August 11, 1992 (age 33) Wuhan, Hubei
- Height: 1.64 m (5 ft 5 in)
- Weight: 48 kg (106 lb)

Sport
- Sport: Diving
- Event(s): 10 m, 10 m synchro
Medal record
Event	1st	2nd	3rd
Olympic Games	1		1
World Championships	2	-	-
Summer Universiade	2	-	1
FINA Diving World Cup	1	1	-
Asian Games	1	-	-
Olympic Games
Gold medal – first place	2008 Beijing	10 m synchro platform
Bronze medal – third place	2008 Beijing	10 m platform
World Championships
Gold medal – first place	2007 Melbourne	10 m platform
Gold medal – first place	2009 Rome	10 m synchro platform
Asian Games
Gold medal – first place	2006 Doha	10 m platform
Universiade
Gold medal – first place	2011 Shenzhen	Team
Gold medal – first place	2011 Shenzhen	10 m synchro platform
Bronze medal – third place	2011 Shenzhen	10 m platform

Wang Xin (Chinese: 王鑫; pinyin: Wáng Xīn; birth name Wang Ruoxue Chinese: 王若雪; pinyin: Wáng Ruòxuě, born August 11, 1992) is a Chinese athlete who competes in diving. She initially trained at Tsinghua University with controversial diving coach Yu Fen before moving to the national team in 2006. She competed for Team China at the 2008 Summer Olympics in Beijing.

== Major achievements ==
1. 2008-02-20 Silver medal at the 2008 16th FINA Diving World Cup (Good Luck Beijing) - 10m platform event.
2. 2008-02-21 Gold medal at the 2008 16th FINA Diving World Cup (Good Luck Beijing), paired with Chen Ruolin - 10m platform synchro event.
3. 2008-08-11 Gold medal at the 2008 Beijing Olympics, paired with Chen Ruolin - 10m platform synchro event.
4. 2008-08-21 Bronze medal at the 2008 Beijing Olympics - 10m platform event.
