= Eftychia Papavasilopoulou =

Greek-American diver (born 1981)

Personal information
- Full name: Eftychia Pappa-Papavasilopoulou
- Nationality: Greek
- Born: 3 October 1981 (age 44) New York, New York, United States
- Height: 1.58 m (5 ft 2 in)
- Weight: 51 kg (112 lb)

Sport
- Sport: Diving
- Event: Platform
- Club: DAS Drapetsounas (GRE)
- Coached by: Youri Artamonov (GRE)

Eftychia Pappa-Papavasilopoulou (Greek: Ευτυχία Παππά-Παπαβασιλόπουλου; born October 3, 1981, in New York, New York, United States) is a female Greek-American diver, who specialized in individual and synchronized platform events. At age nineteen, Papavasilopoulou made her official debut for the 2000 Summer Olympics in Sydney, where she placed twenty-seventh in the women's platform event, with a score of 236.79.

Papavasilopoulou represented her host nation Greece at the 2004 Summer Olympics in Athens, where she competed for individual and synchronized platform events. She reached into the semi-finals of the women's platform event, where she was able to perform an astonishing dive with a total score of 463.89, finishing only in seventeenth place. She also teamed up with her partner Florentia Sfakianou, and cheered by the home crowd for an eighth-place finish in the women's synchronized platform, with an impressive score of 272.40 points.

At the 2008 Summer Olympics in Beijing, Papavasilopoulou competed for the third time in the women's platform, where she scored 252.00 points in the preliminary competition, finishing only in twenty-ninth place.

Papavasilopoulou is a member of DAS Drapetsounas in Piraeus, Greece, being coached and trained by Russian-born Youri Artamonov.
