= Chen Ruolin =

Chinese diver

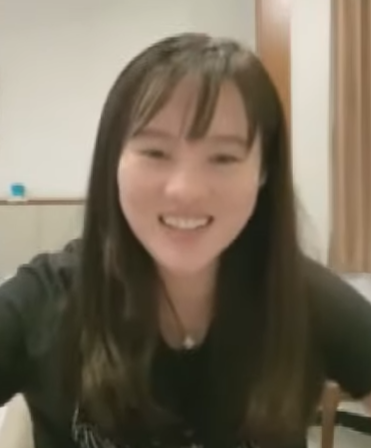
- Chen in 2021

Personal information
- Native name: 陈若琳
- Nationality: Chinese
- Born: 12 December 1992 (age 33) Nantong, Jiangsu, China
- Height: 1.58 m (5 ft 2 in)
- Weight: 47 kg (104 lb)

Sport
- Sport: Diving
- Event(s): 10 m, 10 m synchro
- Coached by: Ren Shaofen
Medal record
Event	1st	2nd	3rd
Olympic Games	5	–	–
World Championships	6	3	1
Summer Universiade	2	-	-
FINA Diving World Cup	8	1	–
Asian Games	2	1	–
Olympic Games
Gold medal – first place	2008 Beijing	10 m platform
Gold medal – first place	2008 Beijing	10 m synchro
Gold medal – first place	2012 London	10 m platform
Gold medal – first place	2012 London	10 m synchro
Gold medal – first place	2016 Rio de Janeiro	10 m synchro
World Championships
Gold medal – first place	2007 Melbourne	10 m synchro
Gold medal – first place	2009 Rome	10 m synchro
Gold medal – first place	2011 Shanghai	10 m
Gold medal – first place	2011 Shanghai	10 m synchro
Gold medal – first place	2013 Barcelona	10 m synchro
Gold medal – first place	2015 Kazan	10 m synchro
Silver medal – second place	2007 Melbourne	10 m
Silver medal – second place	2009 Rome	10 m
Silver medal – second place	2013 Barcelona	10 m
Bronze medal – third place	2015 Kazan	Team
FINA Diving World Cup
Gold medal – first place	2006 Changshu	10 m synchro
Gold medal – first place	2008 Beijing	10 m platform
Gold medal – first place	2008 Beijing	10 m synchro
Gold medal – first place	2010 Changzhou	10 m synchro
Gold medal – first place	2012 London	10 m platform
Gold medal – first place	2012 London	10 m synchro
Gold medal – first place	2014 Shanghai	10 m synchro
Gold medal – first place	2016 Rio de Janeiro	10 m synchro
Silver medal – second place	2010 Changzhou	10 m platform
Asian Games
Gold medal – first place	2014 Incheon	10 m synchro
Gold medal – first place	2006 Doha	10 m synchro
Gold medal – first place	2010 Guangzhou	10 m synchro
Silver medal – second place	2006 Doha	10 m platform
Universiade
Gold medal – first place	2011 Shenzhen	Team
Gold medal – first place	2011 Shenzhen	10 m synchro

Chen Ruolin (Chinese: 陈若琳; pinyin: Chén Ruòlín; born 12 December 1992) is a Chinese platform diver and coach. She is a five-time Olympic gold medalist (2008, 2012 and 2016), ten-time World championship medalist (including six golds), nine-time World Cup medalist (eight golds), four-time Asian Games medalist (three golds) and two-time Universiade gold medalist, making her one of the most accomplished female divers in history.

After retiring from the sport in 2016 due to neck injury, Chen became a diving coach in 2021 and has been personally training 2020 Olympic gold medalist Quan Hongchan and multi-FINA world champion Lian Junjie, who have since both won gold medals at the 2024 Summer Olympics in Paris. On September 19, 2016, Chen Ruolin announced her retirement via social media.

== Career ==
Chen was born in Nantong, Jiangsu. She won the gold medals in the women's 10m platform and 10m synchronized platform at the 2008 Summer Olympics in Beijing for Team China, then duplicated the double gold performance at the London 2012 Summer Olympics.

In the 2011 World Aquatics Championships held in Shanghai, Chen won two gold medals for Women's 10 m platform and Women's 10 m synchro platform (partnering Wang Hao). She became the first Chinese female diver who claimed all the gold medals in women's platform events in Olympic Games, World Cup and World Championships.

In 2014, she lit the torch at the 2014 Summer Youth Olympics in the Nanjing Olympic Sports Centre.

In the 2016 Summer Olympics she won her fifth Olympic gold medal at the 10m synchronised platform event with her partner Liu Huixia, and became only the third Chinese athlete to win five Olympic gold medals.

In October 2016 Chen announced her retirement from diving due to a neck injury.

== Performance timeline ==
=== Women's 10 m platform ===
Tournament	2007	2008	2009	2010	2011	2012	2013	2014	2015	SR
Olympics	NH	G	Not Held			G	Not Held			2 / 2
World Championships	S	NH	S	NH	G	NH	S	NH	A	1 / 4
FINA Diving World Cup	NH	G	NH	S	NH	G	NH	A	NH	2 / 3

=== Women's 10 m synchro platform ===
Tournament	2006	2007	2008	2009	2010	2011	2012	2013	2014	2015	2016	SR
Olympics	NH		G	Not Held			G	Not Held			G	3 / 3
World Championships	NH	G	NH	G	NH	G	NH	G	NH	G	NH	5 / 5
FINA Diving World Cup	G	NH	G	NH	G	NH	G	NH	G	NH	G	6 / 6

Awards
Preceded by First award	FINA Diver of the Year; 2010	Succeeded by (China) Wu Minxia
Olympic Games
Preceded by Egon Zimmermann & Franz Klammer	Final Youth Olympic torchbearer Nanjing 2014	Succeeded by Princess Ingrid Alexandra of Norway
Preceded by Darren Choy	Final Summer Youth Olympic torchbearer Nanjing 2014	Succeeded by Santiago Lange & Paula Pareto
