= Claire Febvay =

French diver

Personal information
- Born: 16 July 1982 (age 42); Oullins, France

Sport
- Country: France
- Sport: Women's diving

Claire Febvay (born 16 July 1982 in Oullins) is a French diver.

She competed in the women's platform diving events at the 2000 Summer Olympics (35th place), the 2004 Summer Olympics (33rd place), and the 2008 Summer Olympics (25th place).
