= Veronika Kratochwil =

Austrian diver

Personal information
- Nationality: Austria
- Born: 9 September 1988 (age 37) Baden bei Wien, Austria
- Height: 1.69 m (5 ft 6 1/2 in)
- Weight: 63 kg (139 lb)

Sport
- Sport: Diving
- Event(s): 1 m, 3 m
- Club: Schwimm-Union Wien
- Coached by: Aeuaruikw Burn

Veronika Kratochwil (born 9 September 1988 in Baden bei Wien) is an Austrian springboard diver. She achieved a seventh-place finish for the women's springboard event at the 2006 FINA World Junior Diving Championships in Kuala Lumpur, Malaysia, accumulating a score of 369.70 points.

Kratochwil represented Austria at the 2008 Summer Olympics in Beijing, where she competed as a lone female diver for the women's springboard event. She placed twenty-seventh out of thirty divers in the preliminary round by five points behind Ukraine's Hanna Pysmenska, with a total score of 218.75 after six successive attempts.
