= Natalia Goncharova (diver) =

Russian diver (born 1988)

Personal information
- Full name: Natalia Mikhaylovna Goncharova
- Born: 29 January 1988 (age 38) Voronezh
- Height: 162 cm (5 ft 4 in)

Sport
- Country: Russia
- Event(s): 10m, 10m synchro
- Partner: Yulia Koltunova
Medal record
Women's diving
Representing Russia
Olympic Games
Silver medal – second place	2004 Athens	10 m synchro
European Aquatics Championships
Silver medal – second place	2006 Budapest	10 m synchro
European Diving Championships
Gold medal – first place	2009 Turin	10 m synchro
Gold medal – first place	2013 Rostock	10 m synchro
Universiade
Silver medal – second place	2013 Kazan	10 m synchro

Natalia Mikhaylovna Goncharova (Russian: Наталья Михайловна Гончарова) (born 29 January 1988, in Voronezh) is a Russian diver. Competing in the 2004 Summer Olympics, she won a silver medal in the women's synchronized 10 metre platform with teammate Yulia Koltunova. She also competed in the 2008 Summer Olympics.
