= Laura Wilkinson =

American diver

Personal information
- Full name: Laura Ann Wilkinson
- Born: November 17, 1977 (age 48) Houston, Texas, U.S.
- Home town: Spring, Texas, U.S.
- Height: 5 ft 6 in (1.68 m)

Sport
- Country: United States
- Events: 3m, 3m synchro, 10m, 10m synchro
- Club: Woodlands Diving Team
Medal record
Women's diving
Representing the United States
Olympic Games
| Gold medal – first place | 2000 Sydney | 10 m platform |
World Championships
| Gold medal – first place | 2005 Montreal | 10 m platform |

Laura Ann Wilkinson (born November 17, 1977) is an American diver, three-time Olympian, and Olympic gold medalist. She is the first woman to win the three major diving world titles. She retired in 2008. After nine years of retirement, she returned to competition in 2017 and placed second at Nationals. She trained for her fourth Olympic Games (2021) at Texas A&M University's swimming and diving facilities but did not qualify.

== Background ==
Wilkinson was born and raised in Houston, Texas and lived with her parents, Ed and Linda. She attended Klein High School before going to University of Texas. As a child, she was a gymnast, but had to give up on the sport after a growth spurt during puberty made her too tall to continue. It was then that she turned to diving. When she first started diving, a teacher told her she was too old to start a new sport and was later kicked off her high school team because they thought she was a "waste of space". She is a 2001 graduate of University of Texas, where she majored in public relations. While attending school on a scholarship, she decided that she would rather put school on hold and go after her dream to become an Olympian. She trained in The Woodlands.

== Career ==
Wilkinson's interest in the sport began as she was swimming in the gym's pool and watched a young female diver in training execute an impressive dive. Her first jump off the 10 meter platform didn't occur until she was 15 years old. She took up platform diving and joined the U.S. National Team in 1995.

=== 2000 Summer Olympics ===
Six months prior to the 2000 Summer Olympics, Wilkinson suffered a serious foot injury that kept her out of action for a couple of months. She employed a visualization technique to practice her dives during this time, and wasn't fully healed when she qualified for the 2000 Summer Olympics. Still in pain from her foot injury, she landed in eighth place after the first of five dives in the platform finals. She went on to earn the first gold medal for a female American platform diver since 1964.

=== 2004 Summer Olympics ===
Wilkinson finished in fifth place at the 2004 Summer Olympics, but had left an impact on her competitors. Several of them repeated the techniques she used at the 2000 Summer Olympics by starting their dives with a handstand.

=== 2008 Summer Olympics ===
On June 26, 2008, Wilkinson qualified as a member of the 2008 U.S. Olympic Diving Team in diving by taking first place in the trials. She ultimately placed 9th in the Women’s 10m platform final. She announced her retirement and this Olympics would be her final competition.

=== 2020 Olympic Games ===
In 2017, after nine years of retirement and spending five years as a pool-deck diving analyst for NBC Sports, Wilkinson returned to competition and placed 2nd at U.S. Nationals. She trained full-time for the 2020 Tokyo Olympics—which would have been her fourth one (delayed until 2021 due to the COVID-19 pandemic), but did not qualify for the team.

=== Non-diving career ===
While not competing in diving, she worked for NBC Sports as a diving analyst on the pool deck, doing so in London 2012, Rio 2016, and Paris 2024, with the latter serving as a color commentator for individual events.

== Personal life ==
Wilkinson is married to Eriek Hulseman. They welcomed their first child, a girl named Arella Joy, on May 11, 2011. In December 2012, they adopted a baby from China named Zoe. Wilkinson gave birth to another child named Zadok in January 2014. Their fourth child, Dakaia, joined the family from Ethiopia in March 2018. She also travels around the country speaking to girls at The Revolve Tour, a Christian girls' conference. She had major surgery on her neck in 2018 to repair damage to discs injured by her diving career.
