= Haley Ishimatsu =

American diver

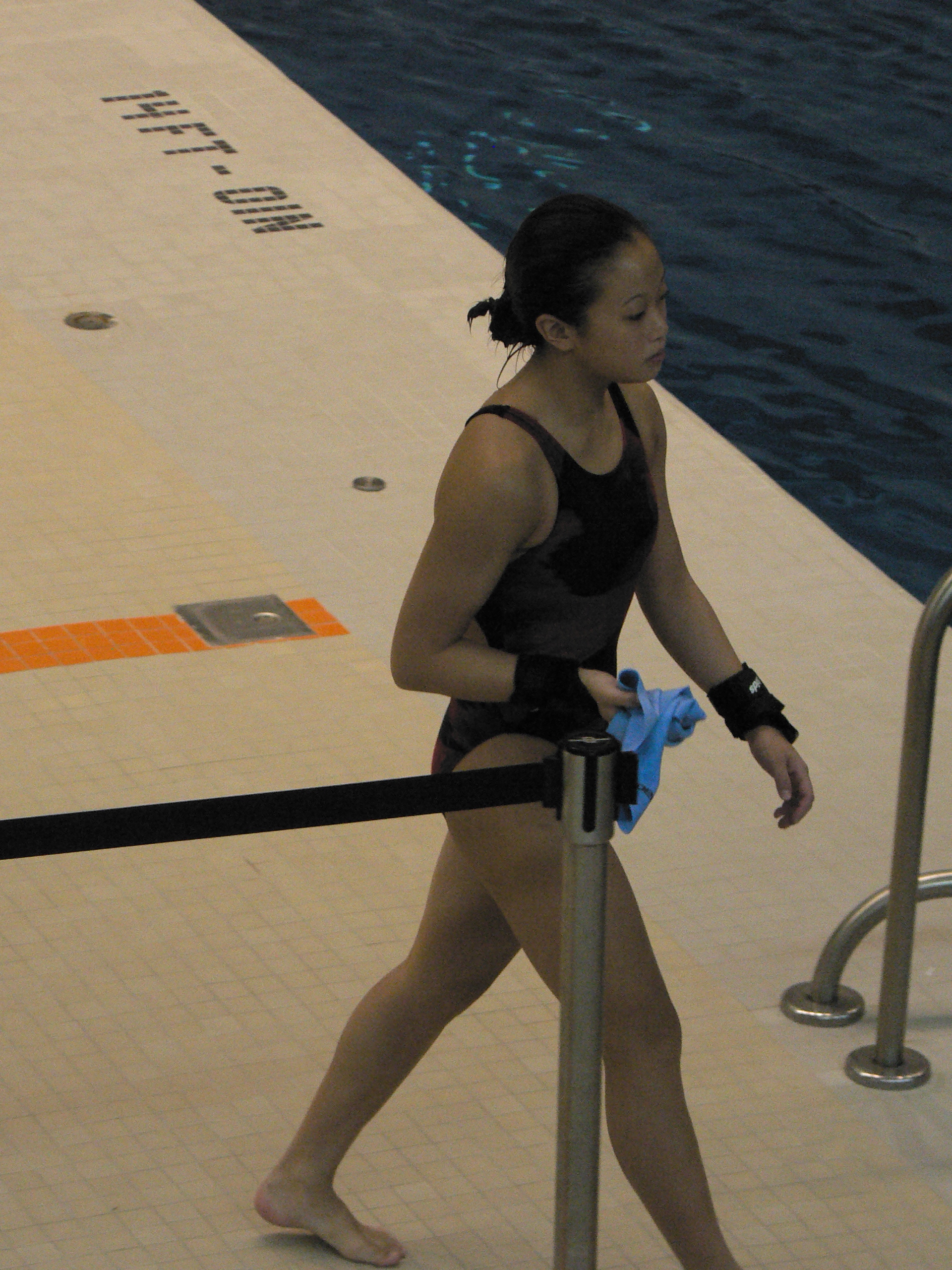
- Haley Ishimatsu at the Olympic diving trials in Knoxville, TN

Personal information
- Full name: Haley Ishimatsu
- Born: September 10, 1992 (age 33) Bellflower, California
- Height: 5 ft 0 in (1.52 m)

Sport
- Country: United States
- Event(s): 10m, 10m synchro
- College team: University of Southern California
- Club: Trojan Dive Club
- Partner: Mary Beth Dunnichay
Medal record
Diving
World Championships
Silver medal – second place	2009 Rome	10m Synchro Platform
Pan American Games
Silver medal – second place	2007 Rio de Janeiro	10-meter
Bronze medal – third place	2007 Rio de Janeiro	Synchronized 10-meter
National Diving Championships
Silver medal – second place	2006 Indianapolis	10-meter
Bronze medal – third place	2007 Stanford	10-meter
USA Diving Spring National Championships
Gold medal – first place	2007 Boyds	10-meter
Gold medal – first place	2007 Boyds	Synchronized 10-meter
Silver medal – second place	2006 Indianapolis	10-meter
Silver medal – second place	2008 Minneapolis	10-meter
Silver medal – second place	2008 Minneapolis	Synchronized 10-meter

Haley Ishimatsu (born September 10, 1992, in Bellflower, California) is an American platform diver.

== Personal life ==
Ishimatsu is a fourth-generation Japanese American. Her older sister Victoria "Tory" Ishimatsu is also a competitive diver, and tried out for the 2008 Summer Olympic Games at the U.S. trials with Haley. At the 2008 Kaiser Permanente National Diving Championships, the elder Ishimatsu placed fourth in both the One-meter Springboard and the Synchronized Springboard Final. Ishimatsu signed a letter of intent to compete collegiality at Duke University beginning in the 2010 season. She has now transferred to the University of Southern California where she started attending fall of 2012.

== Competitive history ==
Ishimatsu has been a member of the U.S. national diving team since 2006, medaling in over ten different competitions nationally and internationally.

Ishimatsu is a member of the 2008 U.S. Olympic team in both the 10-meter platform and the synchronized 10-meter platform event with Mary Beth Dunnichay. In the synchronized competition Ishimatsu and Dunnichay earned fifth place scoring 309.12. In the individual event, Ishimatsu finished tenth with a score of 329.00 in the preliminary round, but did not make finals, finishing in 14th place with a score of 292.95.

Ishimatsu continued diving in preparation for the 2012 Summer Olympics in London, stating: "Now I know what the experience is like, some of the surprises," Ishimatsu told the Associated Press. "I'll be able to deal with it better." However, Ishimatsu failed to secure a return to London, faltering badly on her 4th dive in the June 2012 diving trials in Seattle, WA.
