= Briony Cole =

Australian diver and swimmer

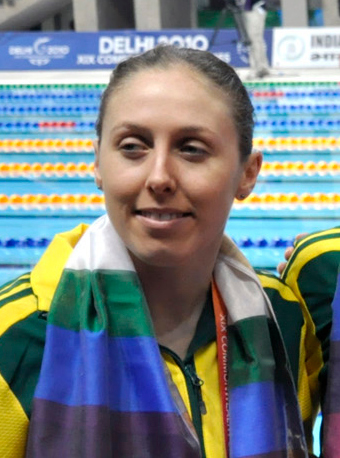
- Cole at the 2010 Commonwealth Games

Personal information
- Full name: Briony Chastine Cole
- Born: 28 February 1983 (age 43) Melbourne, Victoria
- Height: 160 cm (5 ft 3 in)
- Weight: 50 kg (110 lb)

Sport
- Country: Australia
- Event(s): 3 m, 3 m synchro, 10 m, 10 m synchro
- Club: Gannets Diving Club, Victoria
- Coached by: Hui Tong (2005 – present)
Medal record
Representing Australia
Olympic Games
Silver medal – second place	2008 Beijing	10 m synchro
World Championships
Silver medal – second place	2007 Melbourne	10 m synchro
Bronze medal – third place	2007 Melbourne	3 m synchro
Summer Universiade
Bronze medal – third place	2005 İzmir	3 m synchro
Commonwealth Games
Gold medal – first place	2006 Melbourne	3 m synchro
Bronze medal – third place	2010 Delhi	10 m synchro

Briony Chastine "Bree" Cole (born 28 February 1983) is a retired Australian diver who won a gold medal at the 2006 Commonwealth Games, silver and bronze medals at the 2007 World Championships and a silver medal at the Beijing 2008 Olympics, and a bronze medal at the 2010 Commonwealth Games.

== Life ==
Briony Chastine Cole was born in Melbourne in 1983.

As a child, Cole competed in gymnastics, which led her to diving. With Sharleen Stratton, she won gold at the Commonwealth Games in the 3 m synchronised event. She backed that up in 2007 with a silver and bronze medal at the World Championships. Then in 2008, with Melissa Wu she won a silver in the 10 m synchronised platform at the Beijing Olympics.

Cole was born to Mary and Wayne Cole and has an elder sister Sian. She has bachelor's degrees in teaching and applied science (human movement, 2005) from Deakin University. After retiring from competitions she worked for the Australian Sports Commission as a regional coordinator in the Active After-School Communities program.
