= Audrey Labeau =

French diver

Personal information
- Born: February 14, 1985 (age 40); Saint-Germain-en-Laye, France

Sport
- Sport: Diving

Audrey Labeau (born 14 February 1985) is a French diver. She competed in the 10 metre platform event at the 2008 Summer Olympics and in the 10 metre platform event at the 2012 Summer Olympics.
