= Christin Steuer =

German diver

Personal information
- Born: 6 March 1983 (age 43) West Berlin, West Germany

Sport
- Sport: Diving
Medal record
Representing Germany
World Championships
Bronze medal – third place	2011 Shanghai	10 m synchro
Bronze medal – third place	2007 Melbourne	10 m synchro
European Aquatics Championships
Gold medal – first place	2010 Budapest	10 m platform
Gold medal – first place	2010 Budapest	10 m synchro
Gold medal – first place	2010 Budapest	Team event
Bronze medal – third place	2006 Budapest	10 m platform
Bronze medal – third place	2012 Eindhoven	10 m synchro
European Diving Championships
Silver medal – second place	2011 Turin	10 m synchro

Christin Steuer (born 6 March 1983) is a diver from Germany who won the bronze medal at the 2007 and 2011 World Aquatics Championships competing in the women's 10 meter synchronized platform. She has also won a European bronze medal in this discipline. She has also competed at three Olympics in the women's 10 m individual event (2004, 2008 and 2012) and in the women's 10 m synchronized event (2012).

In 2012, she posed nude for a special number of the German edition of the Playboy magazine, along with other German female Olympic athletes.
