= Jordan Cropper =

English footballer (born 2000)

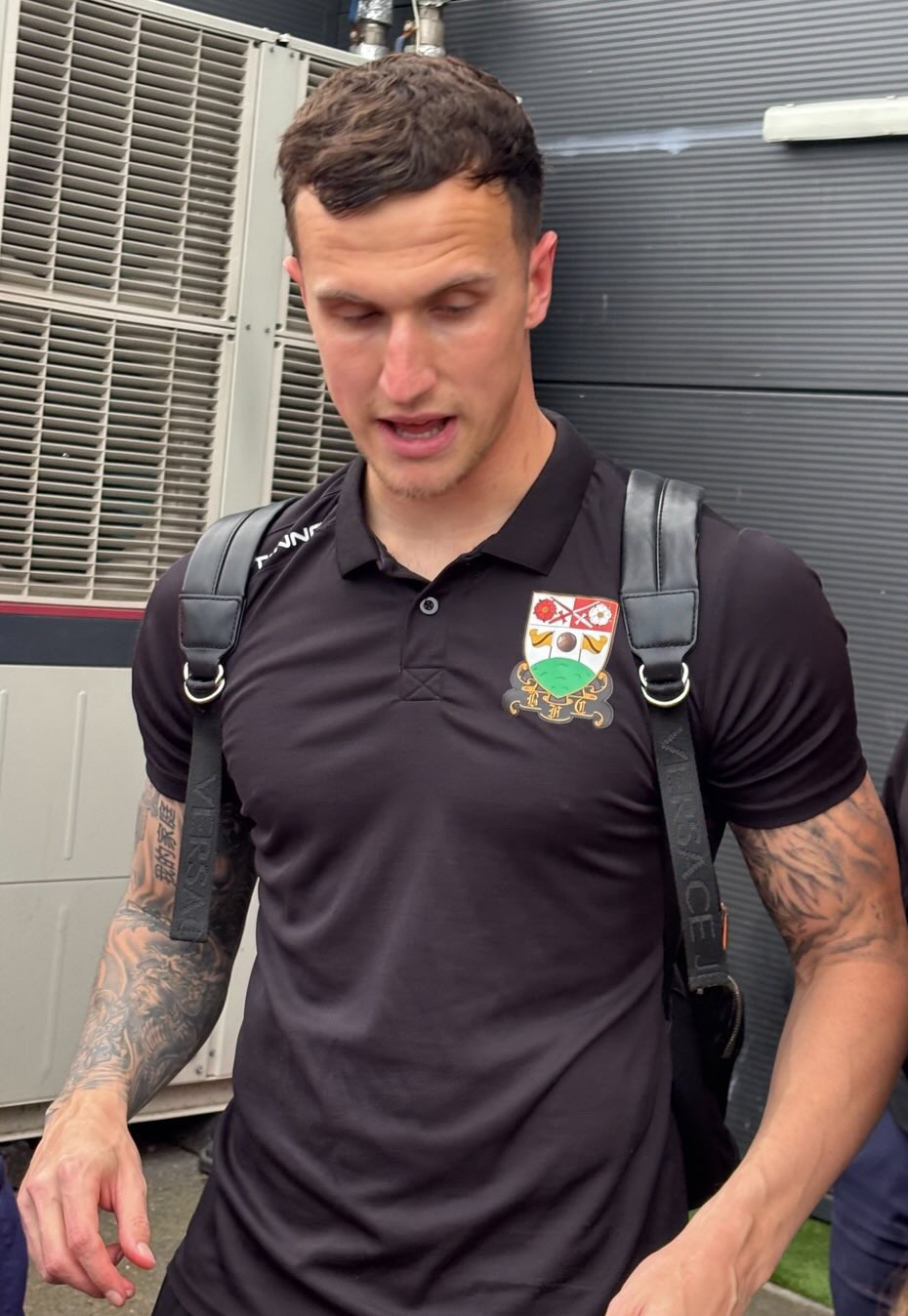
- Cropper in 2025

Personal information
- Full name: Jordan Geoffrey Cropper
- Date of birth: 12 May 2000 (age 26)
- Place of birth: Nottingham, England
- Position: Right back

Team information
- Current team: Worksop Town

Youth career
- 2016–2017: Ilkeston
- 2017–2020: Burnley

Senior career*
Years	Team	Apps	(Gls)
2016–2017	Ilkeston	1	(0)
2020–2021	Burnley	0	(0)
2020	→ Chesterfield (loan)	8	(1)
2020–2021	→ Chesterfield (loan)	12	(2)
2022–2023	Grimsby Town	10	(0)
2023	→ Barnet (loan)	7	(0)
2023–2025	Barnet	54	(0)
2025–2026	Boston United	7	(1)
2026–	Worksop Town	0	(0)
- * Club domestic league appearances and goals as of 12:00, 10 October 2026 (UTC)

Jordan Geoffrey Cropper (born 12 May 2000) is an English professional footballer who plays as a defender for National League North club Worksop Town.

Cropper initially played for non-league side Ilkeston before joining the Burnley youth academy. He signed his first professional contract in 2019 and spent two spells on loan with Chesterfield. He joined Grimsby Town on a permanent deal and despite only playing a small number of games his long throws assisted the winning goal in the both 2022 National League play-off semi final over Wrexham and the subsequent final against Solihull Moors. He has also spent time on loan with Barnet.

== Career ==
=== Early career ===
Born in Nottingham, Cropper came through the youth ranks at Derbyshire-based non-league side Ilkeston initially playing as a striker, making his first team debut at the age of 16 in a Northern Premier League game against Mickleover Sports on Boxing Day 2016.

=== Burnley ===
In March 2017 he joined Premier League side Burnley as an academy player. In September 2017 he scored a hattrick for the under-18's in a game against Sheffield Wednesday.

In April 2019, Cropper signed his first professional contract. On 10 January 2020, Cropper joined Chesterfield on loan for the remainder of the 2019–20 season.

On 20 August 2020, Chesterfield announced they had re-signed Cropper on a season-long loan, although Burnley recalled him on 13 January 2021.

Cropper underwent surgery on his hamstring, that was initially expected to see him miss 4 to 5 months but ended up being absent for 9 months. At the end of the 2020–21 season, Cropper was released by Burnley.

=== Grimsby Town ===
On 25 March 2022, following a trial at the club Cropper joined National League side Grimsby Town on an initial two-month deal until the end of the season. Manager Paul Hurst mentioned "He is a player that has had an injury and is the reason why he has been in on trial. He hasn't managed to secure something at other clubs but I am happy to have him on board."

Following an injury to regular right-back Michee Efete, Cropper had an extended run in the first team during the final months of the season. On 28 May, Grimsby defeated Wrexham 4-5 away from home in the play-off semi final. A long throw in by Cropper connected with Luke Waterfall who headed home the winner in the 119th minute after the game had gone to extra time. In the final at the London Stadium, Cropper again assisted the winner in extra time with another long throw in that resulted in Jordan Maguire-Drew scoring at the back post to send Grimsby back to the Football League at the first time of asking. Cropper signed a new one-year contract with the Mariners ahead of their first season back in the Football League.

In March 2023, he joined Barnet on loan. For a second consecutive season Cropper was involved in the National League play-offs as he was part of the Barnet side that was defeated 2-1 by Boreham Wood.

On 9 May 2023, it was announced that Cropper would not be retained for the 2023–24 season and would be leaving the club when his contract expires on 30 June.

=== Barnet ===
On 28 October 2023, Cropper re-signed for Barnet., for whom he won the National League title with in the 2024/25 season. Including his loan spell, Cropper played 75 times for the Bees.

=== Boston United ===
On 29 May 2025, Cropper returned to the National League, joining Boston United on a one-year deal. In October 2025, manager Graham Coughlan revealed that Cropper had suffered an anterior cruciate ligament injury that would likely rule him out for the remainder of the season.

Following the conclusion of the 2025–26 season, the club reported that Cropper was in talks with the club regarding a new contract.

=== Worksop Town ===
On 10 October 2026, Cropper joined National League North club Worksop Town on a short-term deal.

== Style of play ==
Cropper specialises at long throw ins which played a big part of Grimsby's promotion back to the Football League in 2022.

== Career statistics ==
As of end of 2024-25 season

Appearances and goals by club, season and competition
Club	Season	League			FA Cup		EFL Cup		Other		Total	
Club	Season	Division	Apps	Goals	Apps	Goals	Apps	Goals	Apps	Goals	Apps	Goals
Ilkeston	2016–17	NPL Premier Division	1	0	0	0	—		0	0	1	0
Chesterfield (loan)	2019–20	National League	8	1	0	0	—		0	0	8	1
Chesterfield (loan)	2020–21	National League	12	2	0	0	—		0	0	12	2
Grimsby Town	2021–22	National League	8	0	0	0	—		3 (Note: Appearances in National League playoffs)	0	11	0
Grimsby Town	2022–23	EFL League Two	2	0	1	0	2	0	2 (Note: Appearances in EFL Trophy)	0	7	0
Grimsby Town	Total		10	0	1	0	2	0	5	0	18	0
Barnet (loan)	2022–23	National League	7	0	0	0	—		2 (Note: One appearance in FA Trophy, one appearance in National League playoffs)	0	9	0
Barnet	2023–24	National League	25	0	3	0	—		5 (Note: Three appearances in FA Trophy, one appearance in Middlesex Senior Cup, one appearance in National League playoffs)	0	33	0
Barnet	2024–25	National League	29	0	2	0	—		2 (Note: Appearances in FA Trophy)	0	33	0
Barnet	Total		54	0	5	0	0	0	7	0	66	0
Career total			92	3	6	0	2	0	14	0	114	3

== Honours ==
Grimsby Town

- National League play-offs: 2022

Barnet

- National League: 2024–25
