= 2022–23 Grimsby Town F.C. season =

Grimsby Town
2022–23 season
- Owners: 1878 Partners (63.1%); The Mariners Trust (13.5%); Mike Parker (10.5%); Other Shareholders (12.9%)
- Chairman: Jason Stockwood
- Manager: Paul Hurst
- Stadium: Blundell Park
- League Two: 11th
- FA Cup: Quarter-finals
- EFL Cup: Second round
- EFL Trophy: Second round
- Top goalscorer: League: Harry Clifton (7); All: Harry Clifton (9)
| Home colours | Away colours |

The 2022–23 season was the 145th season in the existence of Grimsby Town Football Club and their first season back in League Two since the 2020–21 season following promotion in the previous season. In addition to the league, they also competed in the 2022–23 FA Cup, the 2022–23 EFL Cup and the 2022–23 EFL Trophy.

During the pre-season, the club sold a record number of season tickets, reaching 4,000 on 22 June 2022.

== Transfers ==
=== In ===
| Date | Pos | Player | Transferred from | Fee | Ref |
|---|---|---|---|---|---|
| 1 July 2022 (Note: The transfer was announced on 29 June, and would become official on July 1, once his Burnley contract expired) | LB | (England) Anthony Glennon | (England) Burnley | Free Transfer | |
| 1 July 2022 | RM | (England) Otis Khan | (England) Leyton Orient | Undisclosed | |
| 1 July 2022 (Note: The transfer was announced on 15 June, and would become official on July 1, once his FC Halifax Town contract expired) | CB | (England) Niall Maher | (England) FC Halifax Town | Free Transfer | |
| 1 July 2022 (Note: The transfer was announced on 17 June, and would become official on July 1, once his Harrogate Town contract expired) | CF | (England) Danilo Orsi | (England) Harrogate Town | Free Transfer | |
| 1 July 2022 (Note: The transfer was announced on 17 June, and would become official on July 1, once his Sunderland contract expired) | CM | (England) Stephen Wearne | (England) Sunderland | Free Transfer | |
| 15 July 2022 | AM | (England) Kieran Green | (England) FC Halifax Town | Undisclosed | |
| 15 July 2022 | DM | (England) Bryn Morris | (England) Burton Albion | Free Transfer | |
| 1 September 2022 | CM | (England) Alex Hunt | (England) Sheffield Wednesday | Undisclosed | |
| 27 September 2022 | GK | (England) Jamie Pardington | (England) Wolverhampton Wanderers | Free Transfer | |
| 31 January 2023 | RB | (England) Josh Emmanuel | (England) Hull City | Undisclosed | |
| 3 February 2023 | LB | (Scotland) Owen Gallacher | (England) Crawley Town | Free Transfer | |

=== Out ===
| Date | Pos | Player | Transferred to | Fee | Ref |
|---|---|---|---|---|---|
| 30 June 2022 | CF | (England) Luis Adlard | (England) Grimsby Borough | Released | |
| 30 June 2022 | CM | (England) Scott Burgess | (England) York City | Released | |
| 30 June 2022 | CM | (England) Giles Coke | Retired | Released | |
| 30 June 2022 | LB | (England) Adam Crookes | (England) York City | Released | |
| 30 June 2022 (Note: The transfer was announced on 17 June, and would become official once his contract expired on June 30) | DM | (England) Ben Fox | (England) Northampton Town | Free Transfer | |
| 30 June 2022 | CF | (England) Lenell John-Lewis | (England) York City | Released | |
| 30 June 2022 | GK | (Republic of Ireland) James McKeown | (Republic of Ireland) Finn Harps | Released | |
| 30 June 2022 | CM | (England) Danny Rose | (England) Darlington | Released | |
| 30 June 2022 | LW | (Portugal) Érico Sousa | (England) Boreham Wood | Released | |
| 30 June 2022 | CM | (England) Luke Spokes | (England) Bath City | Released | |
| 30 June 2022 | RW | (England) Max Wright | (England) Harrogate Town | Released | |
| 7 July 2022 | CB | (England) David Longe-King | (England) Dagenham & Redbridge | Undisclosed | |
| 2 August 2022 | CF | (England) John McAtee | (England) Luton Town | Undisclosed | |
| 4 January 2023 | GK | (England) Jamie Pardington | (Northern Ireland) Larne | Released | |
| 16 January 2023 | RW | (England) Jordan Maguire-Drew | (England) Yeovil Town | Mutual Consent | |
| 24 March 2023 | AM | (England) Stephen Wearne | (England) Gateshead | Free Transfer | |

=== Loans in ===
| Date | Pos | Player | Loaned from | On loan until | Ref |
|---|---|---|---|---|---|
| 21 July 2022 | RM | (England) Brendan Kiernan | (England) Walsall | 24 January 2023 | |
| 28 July 2022 | CB | (England) Andy Smith | (England) Hull City | End of Season | |
| 2 August 2022 | CF | (England) John McAtee | (England) Luton Town | End of Season | |
| 8 August 2022 | CF | (Canada) Aribim Pepple | (England) Luton Town | 12 January 2023 | |
| 1 September 2022 | AM | (England) Lewis Richardson | (England) Burnley | 26 January 2023 | |
| 1 September 2022 | CF | (England) Keyendrah Simmonds | (England) Birmingham City | 14 January 2023 | |
| 14 January 2023 | LM | (England) Mikey O'Neill | (England) Preston North End | End of Season | |
| 31 January 2023 | CF | (Scotland) Tom Dickson-Peters | (England) Norwich City | End of Season | |
| 31 January 2023 | CF | (England) George Lloyd | (England) Cheltenham Town | End of Season | |

=== Loans out ===
| Date | Pos | Player | Loaned to | On loan until | Ref |
|---|---|---|---|---|---|
| 27 September 2022 | GK | (England) Ollie Battersby | (England) Ilkeston Town | 1 January 2023 | |
| 7 October 2022 | DF | (England) Jamie Bramwell | (England) Whitby Town | 7 December 2022 | |
| 14 October 2022 | DF | (England) Jaz Goundry | (England) Grimsby Borough | 14 November 2022 | |
| 14 October 2022 | FW | (England) Edwin Essel | (England) Grimsby Borough | 28 January 2023 | |
| 14 October 2022 | DF | (England) Harvey Tomlinson | (England) Whitby Town | 14 November 2022 | |
| 1 November 2022 | MF | (England) Stephen Wearne | (England) Torquay United | 1 January 2023 | |
| 17 November 2022 | DF | (England) Jaz Goundry | (England) Matlock Town | 17 December 2022 | |
| 25 November 2022 | DF | (England) Harvey Tomlinson | (England) Cleethorpes Town | 17 March 2023 | |
| 26 November 2022 | MF | (England) Aaron Braithwaite | (England) Whitby Town | End of Season | |
| 2 December 2022 | DF | (England) Shaun Pearson | (England) Boston United | 2 January 2023 | |
| 16 December 2022 | RW | (England) Jordan Maguire-Drew | (England) Yeovil Town | 16 January 2023 | |
| 13 January 2023 | DF | (England) Jamie Bramwell | (England) Gainsborough Trinity | 13 February 2023 | |
| 3 March 2023 | CB | (England) Jamie Bramwell | (England) Whitby Town | End of Season | |
| 11 March 2023 | RB | (England) Jordan Cropper | (England) Barnet | End of Season | |
| 24 March 2023 | CF | (England) Edwin Essel | (England) Cleethorpes Town | End of Season | |
| 24 March 2023 | CB | (England) Jaz Goundry | (England) Grimsby Borough | End of Season | |

== Pre-season and friendlies ==
On 9 June, the Mariners announced their first pre-season friendlies, at home to Lincoln City and away to North Ferriby. A third fixture was confirmed 4 days later, against Cleethorpes Town. A trip to Alfreton Town was next to be added to the clubs pre-season schedule.

Win Draw Loss Fixtures

| 9 July 2022 Friendly | Cleethorpes Town | 0–2 | Grimsby Town | Grimsby |
| 14:00 BST | | Report | McAtee 37'; Orsi-Dadomo 85' | Stadium: Myenergi Stadium; Attendance: 2,000 |

| 12 July 2022 Friendly | Hull City U23s | 1–6 | Grimsby Town | North Ferriby |
| 13:00 BST | Hinds 14' | Report | Clifton 37'; Khouri 41'; McAtee 42'; Tomlinson 51'; Essel 75'; Glennon 82' | Stadium: Grange Lane; Attendance: Behind closed doors. |

| 16 July 2022 Friendly | Alfreton Town | 0–4 | Grimsby Town | Alfreton |
| 15:00 BST | | Report | McAtee 15'; Waterfall 25'; Wearne 77'; Braithwaite 84' | Stadium: Impact Arena; Attendance: 407 |

| 19 July 2022 Friendly | Grimsby Town | 0–0 | Lincoln City | Cleethorpes |
| 19:30 BST | | Report | | Stadium: Blundell Park; Attendance: 3,813 |

| 20 July 2022 Friendly | North Ferriby | 1-0 | Grimsby Town XI | North Ferriby |
| 19:30 BST | Donald 41' | Report | | Stadium: Grange Lane; Attendance: 398 |

| 23 July 2022 Friendly | (Spain) CD Tenerife B | 0-4 | (England) Grimsby Town | Santa Cruz de Tenerife, Canary Islands, Spain |
| 17:30 WEST | | | Pearson; McAtee; Kiernan; Efete | Stadium: Tenerife Training Top Field 3 Attendance: Behind closed doors |

| 26 July 2022 Friendly | Grimsby Borough | 3-3 | Grimsby Town XI | Grimsby |
| 19:00 BST | Adlard 19'; Kendall 57'; Drury 74' | | 12'; 15'; 37' | Stadium: Bradley Stadium; Attendance: 270 |

| 18 October 2022 Friendly | Grimsby Town XI | 2-0 | Sheffield United XI | Cleethorpes |
| 12:30 BST | Maguire-Drew; Simmonds | Report | | Stadium: Blundell Park; Attendance: Behind closed doors |

== Competitions ==
=== Overall record ===
| Competition | First match | Last match | Starting round | Record | | | | | | | |
| Competition | First match | Last match | Starting round | Pld | W | D | L | GF | GA | GD | Win % |
|---|---|---|---|---|---|---|---|---|---|---|---|
| League Two | 30 July 2022 | May 2023 | Matchday 1 | 0 | 0 | 0 | 0 | 0 | 0 | +0 | — |
| FA Cup | 5 November 2022 | TBC | First round | 0 | 0 | 0 | 0 | 0 | 0 | +0 | — |
| EFL Cup | 10 August 2022 | TBC | First round | 0 | 0 | 0 | 0 | 0 | 0 | +0 | — |
| EFL Trophy | TBC | TBC | Group stage | 0 | 0 | 0 | 0 | 0 | 0 | +0 | — |
| Total | | | | 0 | 0 | 0 | 0 | 0 | 0 | +0 | — |

Last updated: pre-season
Source: [ Soccerway]

=== League Two ===
==== League table ====
| Pos | Team | Pld | W | D | L | GF | GA | GD | Pts |
|---|---|---|---|---|---|---|---|---|---|
| 8 | Mansfield Town | 46 | 21 | 12 | 13 | 72 | 55 | +17 | 75 |
| 9 | Barrow | 46 | 18 | 8 | 20 | 47 | 53 | −6 | 62 |
| 10 | Swindon Town | 46 | 16 | 13 | 17 | 61 | 55 | +6 | 61 |
| 11 | Grimsby Town | 46 | 16 | 13 | 17 | 49 | 56 | −7 | 61 |
| 12 | Tranmere Rovers | 46 | 15 | 13 | 18 | 45 | 48 | −3 | 58 |
| 13 | Crewe Alexandra | 46 | 14 | 16 | 16 | 48 | 60 | −12 | 58 |
| 14 | Sutton United | 46 | 15 | 13 | 18 | 46 | 58 | −12 | 58 |

Source: EFL Official Website
Rules for classification: 1) Points; 2) Goal difference; 3) Number of goals scored; 4) Head-to-head results; 5) Wins; 6) Away goals; 7) Penalty points (sec 9.5); 8) 12-point sending off offences

==== Results summary ====
| Overall | | | | | | | | Home | | | | | | Away | | | | | |
| Pld | W | D | L | GF | GA | GD | Pts | W | D | L | GF | GA | GD | W | D | L | GF | GA | GD |
|---|---|---|---|---|---|---|---|---|---|---|---|---|---|---|---|---|---|---|---|
| 44 | 15 | 13 | 16 | 48 | 54 | −6 | 58 | 6 | 10 | 6 | 23 | 25 | −2 | 9 | 3 | 10 | 25 | 29 | −4 |

Last updated: 25 April 2023.
Source: [ Soccerway]

==== Results by round ====
| Round | 1 | 2 | 3 | 4 | 5 | 6 | 7 | 8 | 9 | 10 | 11 | 12 | 13 | 14 | 15 | 16 | 17 | 18 | 19 | 20 | 21 | 22 | 23 | 24 | 25 | 26 | 27 | 28 | 29 | 30 | 31 | 32 | 33 | 34 | 35 | 36 | 37 | 38 | 39 | 40 | 41 | 42 | 43 | 44 |
|---|---|---|---|---|---|---|---|---|---|---|---|---|---|---|---|---|---|---|---|---|---|---|---|---|---|---|---|---|---|---|---|---|---|---|---|---|---|---|---|---|---|---|---|---|
| Ground | A | H | A | H | A | A | H | A | H | H | A | H | A | H | A | A | H | H | A | H | A | H | H | A | A | H | A | A | H | H | A | H | H | A | A | H | A | A | H | A | H | H | A | H |
| Result | L | D | W | D | W | W | D | W | L | L | D | W | W | D | L | L | L | D | L | W | L | L | W | L | W | L | L | W | D | D | L | D | W | W | D | D | D | L | L | W | D | W | L | W |
| Position | 21 | 18 | 14 | 16 | 14 | 9 | 9 | 8 | 8 | 12 | 13 | 11 | 10 | 10 | 11 | 13 | 14 | 16 | 16 | 14 | 16 | 16 | 16 | 16 | 16 | 17 | 19 | 16 | 17 | 16 | 17 | 16 | 16 | 15 | 15 | 15 | 15 | 15 | 15 | 14 | 13 | 12 | 13 | 11 |

Updated to match(es) played on 25 April 2023. Source: [ Soccerway]
A = Away; H = Home; W = Win; D = Draw; L = Loss; P = Postponed

==== Matches ====
Win Draw Loss Fixtures

On 23 June, the league fixtures were announced.

| 30 July 2022 1 | Leyton Orient | 2–0 | Grimsby Town | Leyton |
| 15:00 BST | James (yellow card) 45+1', (goal) 56'; Hunt (yellow card) 45+4'; Moncur 49' (pen.); Beckles (yellow card) 87' | Report | Taylor (yellow card) 76'; McAtee (yellow card) 90' | Stadium: Breyer Group Stadium; Attendance: 8,557; Referee: Christopher Pollard |

| 6 August 2022 2 | Grimsby Town | 1–1 | Northampton Town | Cleethorpes |
| 15:00 BST | Maguire-Drew 88' | Report | Hoskins 74'; Haynes (yellow card) 90+1' | Stadium: Blundell Park; Attendance: 7,154; Referee: Thomas Parsons |

| 13 August 2022 3 | Rochdale | 0–1 | Grimsby Town | Rochdale |
| 15:00 BST | Ebanks-Landell (yellow card) 37'; Seriki (yellow card) 46'; Nelson (yellow card) 49'; Tulloch (yellow card) 60' | Report | Clifton (yellow card) 29'; Morris (yellow card) 45+3'; Waterfall 90+2' | Stadium: Spotland; Referee: Thomas Kirk |

| 16 August 2022 | Grimsby Town | Abandoned | Carlisle United | Cleethorpes |
| 19:45 BST | | | Mellish (yellow card) 16' | Stadium: Blundell Park; Referee: Simon Mather |
Note: Match was abandoned due to a waterlogged pitch.

| 20 August 2022 4 | Grimsby Town | 0–0 | Sutton United | Cleethorpes |
| 15:00 BST | Waterfall (yellow card) 42'; Holohan (yellow card) 47'; Green (yellow card) 86' | Report | John (yellow card) 34'; Boldewijn (yellow card) 86' | Stadium: Blundell Park; Attendance: 6,239; Referee: Martin Woods |

| 27 August 2022 5 | Walsall | 1–2 | Grimsby Town | Bescot |
| 15:00 BST | Johnson 5', (yellow card) 22' | Report | Clifton 77', 82'; Pepple (yellow card) 90+6' | Stadium: Poundland Bescot Stadium; Attendance: 5,644; Referee: Peter Wright |

| 3 September 2022 6 | Newport County | 0–2 | Grimsby Town | Newport |
| 15:00 BST | Bennett (yellow card) 22'; Evans (yellow card) 90+2' | Report | Morris 63'; Kiernan (yellow card) 80'; Clifton 83'; Smith (yellow card) 88' | Stadium: Rodney Parade; Attendance: 4,251; Referee: Scott Oldham |

| 10 September 2022 | Grimsby Town | Postponed | Crewe Alexandra | Cleethorpes |
| 15:00 BST | | | | Stadium: Blundell Park |
Note: Fixture was postponed as a mark of respect following the passing of Queen Elizabeth II.

| 13 September 2022 7 | Grimsby Town | 1–1 | Gillingham | Cleethorpes |
| 19:45 BST | Taylor 7'; Holohan (yellow card) 90' | Report | Mandron 14', (yellow card) 86'; Adelakun (yellow card) 78' | Stadium: Blundell Park; Attendance: 5,960; Referee: Andy Haines |

| 17 September 2022 8 | Colchester United | 0–1 | Grimsby Town | Colchester |
| 15:00 BST | Longstaff (yellow card) 36' | Report | Efete (yellow card) 42'; Clifton 63'; Kiernan (yellow card) 78' | Stadium: JobServe Community Stadium; Attendance: 3,167; Referee: Sunny Gill |

| 24 September 2022 9 | Grimsby Town | 1–2 | Swindon Town | Cleethorpes |
| 15:00 BST | Taylor 25'; Glennon (yellow card) 48' | Report | Jephcott 13', (yellow card) 87'; Darcy 44'; Khan (yellow card) 49' (yellow-red card) 62'; Hutton (yellow card) 85'; Blake-Tracy (yellow card) 90+7' | Stadium: Blundell Park; Attendance: 6,805; Referee: Declan Bourne |

| 27 September 2022 10 | Grimsby Town | 1–2 | Carlisle United | Cleethorpes |
| 19:45 BST | Efete 65'; Hunt (yellow card) 71' | Report | Moxon 7'; Dennis 44'; Guy (yellow card) 67'; Armer (yellow card) 68' | Stadium: Blundell Park; Attendance: 6,447; Referee: Simon Mather |

| 1 October 2022 11 | Salford City | 1–1 | Grimsby Town | Salford |
| 15:00 BST | Vassell 2' | Report | Richardson 29'; Clifton (yellow card) 62' | Stadium: Moor Lane; Attendance: 3,521; Referee: Marc Edwards |

| 8 October 2022 12 | Grimsby Town | 3–0 | Crawley Town | Cleethorpes |
| 15:00 BST | Glennon 4'; Holohan 52'; Kiernan (yellow card) 81'; Taylor 85' (yellow card) 90+3' | Report | Lynch (yellow card) 3' | Stadium: Blundell Park; Attendance: 6,068; Referee: Anthony Backhouse |

| 15 October 2022 13 | Stockport County | 1–3 | Grimsby Town | Edgeley |
| 15:00 BST | Madden 41' (yellow card) 57'; Camps (red card) 72' | Report | Clifton 24'; Holohan 30'; Green (yellow card) 40'; Glennon (yellow card) 55'; Efete (yellow card) 67'; Taylor (yellow card) 90+3'; Hunt 90+5'; Crocombe (yellow card) 90+5' | Stadium: Edgeley Park; Attendance: 9,464; Referee: Alan Young |

| 22 October 2022 14 | Grimsby Town | 0–0 | Bradford City | Cleethorpes |
| 15:00 BST | Kiernan (yellow card) 36' | Report | Wright (yellow card) 47' | Stadium: Blundell Park; Attendance: 8,020; Referee: Martin Coy |

| 25 October 2022 15 | Barrow | 1–0 | Grimsby Town | Barrow-in-Furness |
| 19:45 BST | Brough (yellow card) 31'; Kay (penalty missed) 39'; Canavan (yellow card) 51'; Waters 75' | Report | Waterfall (yellow card) 51'; Hunt (yellow card) 90+3' | Stadium: Furness Building Society Stadium; Attendance: 3,301; Referee: Ben Toner |

| 29 October 2022 16 | Hartlepool United | 2–1 | Grimsby Town | Hartlepool |
| 15:00 BST | Tumilty (yellow card) 17'; Lacey (yellow card) 56' (goal) 78'; Maher 82' (o.g.) | Report | Holohan 6'; Morris (yellow card) 18'; Waterfall (yellow card) 31' | Stadium: Suit Direct Stadium; Attendance: 4,600; Referee: Sam Barrott |

| 12 November 2022 17 | Grimsby Town | 1–3 | Doncaster Rovers | Cleethorpes |
| 15:00 GMT | Hunt (yellow card) 44'; Smith (yellow card) 45+1'; McAtee 79'; Glennon (yellow card) 86' | Report | Miller 6', 63'; Biggins 51' | Stadium: Blundell Park; Attendance: 8,046; Referee: Lewis Smith |

| 19 November 2022 18 | Grimsby Town | 1–1 | Stevenage | Cleethorpes |
| 15:00 GMT | McAtee (penalty missed) 39'; Green (yellow card) 42'; Maher 90+1' | Report | Piergianni (yellow card) 49'; Reeves 79'; Earley (yellow card) 80' | Stadium: Blundell Park; Attendance: 6,022; Referee: Tom Reeves |

| 3 December 2022 19 | AFC Wimbledon | 1–0 | Grimsby Town | Wimbledon |
| 15:00 GMT | Biler (yellow card) 34'; Kalambayi (yellow card) 49'; Chislett 60'; Pell (yellow card) 66' | Report | Simmonds (yellow card) 78' | Stadium: The Cherry Red Records Stadium; Attendance: 7,962; Referee: Darren Handley |

| 10 December 2022 20 | Grimsby Town | 2–1 | Tranmere Rovers | Cleethorpes |
| 15:00 GMT | Kiernan 7'; Maher 58'; Khan (yellow card) 80' | Report | Lewis (yellow card) 45+2'; Burton 66' | Stadium: Blundell Park; Attendance: 5,134; Referee: Seb Stockbridge |

| 17 December 2022 | Mansfield Town | Postponed | Grimsby Town | Mansfield |
| 15:00 GMT | | | | Stadium: One Call Stadium |
Note: Fixture was postponed due to a frozen pitch.

| 26 December 2022 21 | Harrogate Town | 3–2 | Grimsby Town | Harrogate |
| 15:00 GMT | Armstrong 12', 76'; Burrell (yellow card) 31'; Ramsay (yellow card) 42'; Crocombe 90+1' (o.g.) | Report | Khan 29'; Green (yellow card) 42'; Clifton 49' | Stadium: EnviroVent Stadium; Attendance: 2,744; Referee: Bobby Madden |

| 29 December 2022 22 | Grimsby Town | 1–4 | Salford City | Cleethorpes |
| 19:45 GMT | Khan 21'; Glennon (yellow card) 22' | Report | Smith 1', 34', 40'; Galbraith 30' | Stadium: Blundell Park; Attendance: 6,178; Referee: Carl Boyeson |

| 1 January 2023 23 | Grimsby Town | 1–0 | Stockport County | Cleethorpes |
| 15:00 GMT | Khan 51'; Green (yellow card) 78'; Clifton (yellow card) 81' | Report | | Stadium: Blundell Park; Attendance: 6,490; Referee: Adam Herczeg |

| 14 January 2023 24 | Swindon Town | 5–0 | Grimsby Town | Swindon |
| 15:00 GMT | Austin 25'; Lavinier 62'; Williams 66'; Khan (yellow card) 71', (goal) 88'; Darcy 78' | Report | Amos (red card) 34'; Clifton (yellow card) 59'; Holohan (yellow card) 74' | Stadium: The County Ground; Attendance: 11,053; Referee: Sam Purkiss |

| 21 January 2023 | Grimsby Town | Postponed | Harrogate Town | Cleethorpes |
| 15:00 GMT | | | | Stadium: Blundell Park |
Note: Fixture was postponed due to a frozen pitch.

| 24 January 2023 | Crawley Town | Postponed | Grimsby Town | Crawley |
| 19:45 GMT | | | | Stadium: Broadfield Stadium |
Note: Fixture was postponed due to a frozen pitch.

| 4 February 2023 25 | Crewe Alexandra | 0–3 | Grimsby Town | Crewe |
| 15:00 GMT | | Report | McAtee 3'; Lloyd 31'; Green (yellow card) 73'; Dickson-Peters 84' | Stadium: Mornflake Stadium; Attendance: 4,460; Referee: Paul Howard |

| 11 February 2023 26 | Grimsby Town | 0–1 | Colchester United | Cleethorpes |
| 15:00 GMT | Waterfall (yellow card) 45' | Report | Hopper 32'; Wood (yellow card) 45+4'; O'Hara (yellow card) 78' | Stadium: Blundell Park; Attendance: 6,462; Referee: David Rock |

| 14 February 2023 27 | Gillingham | 2–1 | Grimsby Town | Gillingham |
| 19:45 GMT | Lapslie 56'; MacDonald (yellow card) 70'; Hawkins 87' | Report | Glennon (yellow card) 19'; Holohan 75', (yellow card) 90+1'; Waterfall (yellow card) 90+4' | Stadium: MEMS Priestfield Stadium; Attendance: 5,097; Referee: Craig Hicks |

| 18 February 2023 28 | Northampton Town | 1–2 | Grimsby Town | Northampton |
| 14:00 GMT | Hoskins 18'; Guthrie (yellow card) 90+7' | Report | Amos (yellow card) 15'; Emmanuel (yellow card) 36'; Waterfall 74'; Glennon 90+1', (yellow card) 90+2'; Taylor (yellow card) 90+7' | Stadium: Sixfields Stadium; Attendance: 6,694; Referee: Simon Mather |

| 21 February 2023 29 | Grimsby Town | 0–0 | Harrogate Town | Cleethorpes |
| 19:45 GMT | | Report | | Stadium: Blundell Park; Attendance: 5,487; Referee: Tom Nield |

| 25 February 2023 30 | Grimsby Town | 2–2 | Leyton Orient | Cleethorpes |
| 15:00 GMT | McAtee 46'; Lloyd 52', (yellow card) 72'; Glennon (penalty missed) 75' | Report | Kelman 25', (yellow card) 75'; Moncur 68'; Archibald (yellow card) 72'; Sotiriou (yellow card) 75' | Stadium: Blundell Park; Attendance: 6,283; Referee: Andy Haines |

| 5 March 2023 31 | Carlisle United | 2–0 | Grimsby Town | Carlisle |
| 15:00 GMT | McCalmont 36'; Gibson 44'; Huntington (yellow card) 61' | Report | O'Neill (yellow card) 34'; Khan (yellow card) 50' | Stadium: Brunton Park; Attendance: 6,561; Referee: Marc Edwards |

| 7 March 2023 32 | Grimsby Town | 1–1 | Newport County | Cleethorpes |
| 19:45 GMT | McAtee 36'; Waterfall (yellow card) 48' | Report | Farquharson 55' | Stadium: Blundell Park; Attendance: 4,851; Referee: Bobby Madden |

| 11 March 2023 33 | Grimsby Town | 1–0 | Rochdale | Cleethorpes |
| 15:00 GMT | Glennon (yellow card) 14'; Lloyd 68'; Crocombe (yellow card) 77'; Maher (yellow card) 81'; Waterfall (yellow card) 90+3' | Report | Quigley (yellow card) 77' | Stadium: Blundell Park; Attendance: 5,963; Referee: James Oldham |

| 14 March 2023 34 | Sutton United | 0–1 | Grimsby Town | Sutton |
| 19:45 GMT | Milsom (yellow card) 12'; Beautyman (yellow card) 79'; Rowe (yellow card) 90+7'; Kizzi (yellow card) 90+7' | Report | Efete 34'; Amos (yellow card) 38'; Clifton (yellow card) 66' | Stadium: VBS Community Stadium; Attendance: 2,751; Referee: Andy Davies |

| 22 March 2023 35 | Mansfield Town | 0–0 | Grimsby Town | Mansfield |
| 19:45 GMT | | Report | Maher (yellow card) 53' | Stadium: One Call Stadium; Attendance: 7,569 (1,102 Grimsby supporters); Referee: Tom Reeves |

| 25 March 2023 36 | Grimsby Town | 1–1 | Walsall | Cleethorpes |
| 15:00 GMT | Morris 18', (yellow card) 81'; Maher (yellow card) 49'; Smith (yellow card) 73'; Green (yellow card) 85'; Amos (yellow card) 88' | Report | McEntee (yellow card) 38'; Daniels 50', (yellow card) 90+4'; Evans (yellow card) 60'; White (yellow card) 60' | Stadium: Blundell Park; Attendance: 6,176; Referee: Robert Lewis |

| 28 March 2023 37 | Crawley Town | 1–1 | Grimsby Town | Crawley |
| 19:45 GMT | Oteh (yellow card) 19'; Telford 87' (pen.); Lynch (yellow card) 89' | Report | Khan (yellow card) 33'; Clifton 42'; Crocombe (yellow card) 86' | Stadium: Broadfield Stadium; Attendance: 2,668; Referee: Lee Swabey |

| 1 April 2023 38 | Bradford City | 3–2 | Grimsby Town | Bradford |
| 13:00 BST | Gilliead 7'; Lewis (yellow card) 22'; Chapman (yellow card) 43'; Walker 62'; Cook 81'; Ridehalgh (yellow card) 90+4' | Report | Clifton (yellow card) 20'; Holohan 23' (pen.); Smith 44' | Stadium: University of Bradford Stadium; Attendance: 19,011; Referee: Charles Breakspear |

| 7 April 2023 39 | Grimsby Town | 1–4 | Hartlepool United | Cleethorpes |
| 15:00 BST | Efete 54'; Taylor (yellow card) 80' | Report | Kemp 19', 68' (pen.), 72'; Umerah 76' | Stadium: Blundell Park; Attendance: 7,425; Referee: Anthony Backhouse |

| 10 April 2023 40 | Doncaster Rovers | 1–2 | Grimsby Town | Doncaster |
| 15:00 BST | Barlow 26'; Mitchell (yellow card) 77' | Report | Waterfall (yellow card) 13'; Smith (yellow card) 28'; Taylor (yellow card) 45+3'; Glennon (yellow card) 79'; Maher 85'; Lloyd 90+6' | Stadium: Eco-Power Stadium; Attendance: 8,620; Referee: Alan Young |

| 15 April 2023 41 | Grimsby Town | 1–1 | Mansfield Town | Cleethorpes |
| 15:00 BST | Efete (yellow card) 3'; Khan (penalty missed) 52'; Lloyd 52'; Maher (yellow card) 72' | Report | Hewitt (yellow card) 28'; Bowery 39'; Pym (yellow card) 52'; Wallace (yellow card) 87' | Stadium: Blundell Park; Attendance: 7,088; Referee: Neil Hair |

| 18 April 2023 42 | Grimsby Town | 1–0 | Barrow | Cleethorpes |
| 19:45 BST | Emmanuel (yellow card) 72'; Orsi 77' | Report | Young (yellow card) 1'; Gotts (yellow card) 26' | Stadium: Blundell Park; Attendance: 4,902; Referee: Lewis Smith |

| 22 April 2023 43 | Tranmere Rovers | 2–0 | Grimsby Town | Birkenhead |
| 15:00 BST | Hawkes 33' (pen.); Hughes 48'; Turnbull (yellow card) 70' | Report | Hunt (yellow card) 89'; Lloyd (yellow card) 90+5' | Stadium: Prenton Park; Attendance: 5,600; Referee: Marc Edwards |

| 25 April 2023 44 | Grimsby Town | 2–0 | Crewe Alexandra | Cleethorpes |
| 19:45 BST | Holohan 13'; Khan (yellow card) 77'; Orsi 82' | Report | Mellor (yellow card) 17' | Stadium: Blundell Park; Attendance: 4,482; Referee: Darren Handley |

| 29 April 2023 45 | Stevenage | 2–0 | Grimsby Town | Stevenage |
| 15:00 BST | Reid 57'; Wildoin 67' | Report | Holohan (yellow card) 58' | Stadium: Broadhall Way; Attendance: 6,533; Referee: Will Finnie |

| 8 May 2023 46 | Grimsby Town | 1–0 | AFC Wimbledon | Cleethorpes |
| 15:00 BST | Ogundere 57' (own goal); Glennon (yellow card) 38' | Report | Davison (yellow card) 34'; Ogundere (yellow card) 43'; Nightingale (yellow card) 90+3' | Stadium: Blundell Park; Attendance: 6,733; Referee: David Rock |

=== FA Cup ===
As a League Two side, Grimsby entered the FA Cup in the first round, and were drawn at home to League One side Plymouth Argyle. They were then drawn away to League One side Cambridge United in the second round, at home to League One team Burton Albion in the third round, then away to Championship club Luton Town in the fourth round. In the fifth round, Grimsby were drawn away to Premier League club Southampton, where they produced a shock 2–1 victory and advanced to the quarter-finals for the first time in 84 years, they were the first team to knock out five teams from higher divisions in FA Cup history and the first fourth-tier side to reach the quarter-finals since Cambridge United in the 1989–90 season. In the quarter-finals, they were drawn away to Premier League side Brighton & Hove Albion.

Win Draw Loss Fixtures

| 5 November 2022 First round | Grimsby Town | 5–1 | Plymouth Argyle | Cleethorpes |
| 15:00 GMT | Smith 10', (yellow card) 87'; Efete 33'; Kiernan 39', 58'; Glennon 45+7'; Khan (yellow card) 49' | Report | Randell 5'; Butcher (yellow card) 70' | Stadium: Blundell Park; Attendance: 4,571; Referee: Thomas Parsons |

| 26 November 2022 Second round | Cambridge United | 1–2 | Grimsby Town | Cambridge |
| 15:00 GMT | Digby (yellow card) 42'; Smith 81' | Report | Green (yellow card) 29'; Waterfall (yellow card) 45+2'; Khan 61', 90'; McAtee (yellow card) 83' | Stadium: Abbey Stadium; Attendance: 3,044; Referee: Carl Brook |

| 7 January 2023 Third round | Grimsby Town | 1–0 | Burton Albion | Cleethorpes |
| 17:30 GMT | Richardson 76', (yellow card) 90+4'; Morris (yellow card) 90+2' | Report | Kamwa (yellow card) 68'; Amissah (yellow card) 85' | Stadium: Blundell Park; Attendance: 5,447; Referee: Charles Breakspear |

| 28 January 2023 Fourth round | Luton Town | 2–2 | Grimsby Town | Luton |
| 15:00 GMT | Adebayo 49' (pen.); Clark 66' | Report | Holohan 43', (yellow card) 88'; Clifton (yellow card) 45+1', (goal) 67'; Orsi (yellow card) 65'; Maher (yellow card) 73'; Crocombe (yellow card) 90+2' | Stadium: Kenilworth Road; Attendance: 8,552; Referee: Tim Robinson |

| 7 February 2023 Fourth round replay | Grimsby Town | 3–0 | Luton Town | Cleethorpes |
| 19:45 GMT | Clifton 9'; Orsi 28'; Morris (yellow card) 33'; Amos (yellow card) 43', (goal) 45+5'; Efete (yellow card) 80' | Report | Watson (yellow card) 43'; Onyedinma (yellow card) 90' | Stadium: Blundell Park; Attendance: 7,051; Referee: Sam Barrott |

| 1 March 2023 Fifth round | Southampton | 1–2 | Grimsby Town | Southampton |
| 19:15 GMT | Ćaleta-Car (yellow card) 49', (goal) 65' | Report | Hunt (yellow card) 32'; Holohan 45+1' (pen.), 50' (pen.) | Stadium: St Mary's Stadium; Attendance: 27,584; Referee: Thomas Bramall |

| 19 March 2023 Quarter-finals | Brighton & Hove Albion | 5–0 | Grimsby Town | Brighton and Hove |
| 14:15 GMT | Undav 6'; Ferguson 51', 70'; March 82'; Mitoma 90' | Report | | Stadium: Falmer Stadium; Attendance: 29,415; Referee: Jarred Gillett |

=== EFL Cup ===
Win Draw Loss Fixtures

The Mariners were drawn at home to Crewe Alexandra in the first round and to Nottingham Forest in the second round.

| 9 August 2022 First round | Grimsby Town | 4–0 | Crewe Alexandra | Cleethorpes |
| 19:45 BST | Amos (yellow card) 3'; Waterfall 13'; Green 34'; Smith 56'; Wearne 86' | Report | Mellor (yellow card) 65' | Stadium: Blundell Park; Attendance: 2,802; Referee: Adam Herczeg |

| 23 August 2022 Second round | Grimsby Town | 0–3 | Nottingham Forest | Cleethorpes |
| 19:45 BST | | Report | Yates 18'; Surridge 35', 77', (yellow card) 70' | Stadium: Blundell Park; Attendance: 8,418; Referee: Seb Stockbridge |

=== EFL Trophy ===
On 20 June, the initial Group stage draw was made, grouping Grimsby Town with Derby County and Mansfield Town. In the second round, The Mariners were drawn at home to Accrington Stanley.

| Pos | Div | Team | Pld | W | PW | PL | L | GF | GA | GD | Pts | Qualification |
|---|---|---|---|---|---|---|---|---|---|---|---|---|
| 1 | L2 | Grimsby Town | 3 | 1 | 1 | 0 | 1 | 4 | 4 | 0 | 5 | Advance to Round 2 |
| 2 | L2 | Mansfield Town | 3 | 1 | 1 | 0 | 1 | 4 | 5 | −1 | 5 | Advance to Round 2 |
| 3 | ACA | Manchester City U21 | 3 | 1 | 0 | 1 | 1 | 6 | 5 | +1 | 4 | |
| 4 | L1 | Derby County | 3 | 1 | 0 | 1 | 1 | 5 | 5 | 0 | 4 | |

Source: EFL.com

Win Draw Loss Fixtures

| 30 August 2022 Group stage | Derby County | 3–1 | Grimsby Town | Derby |
| 19:00 BST | Mendez-Laing 6'; Sibley 42'; Bird 45', (yellow card) 58' | Report | Cropper (yellow card) 60'; Kiernan 88' | Stadium: Pride Park Stadium; Attendance: 5,348; Referee: Carl Boyeson |

| 20 September 2022 Group stage | Grimsby Town | 2–0 | Mansfield Town | Cleethorpes |
| 19:30 BST | Khan 15'; Orsi-Dadomo 39'; Pearson (yellow card) 60' | Report | O'Toole (yellow card) 33' | Stadium: Blundell Park; Attendance: 912; Referee: Bobby Madden |

| 8 November 2022 Group stage | Grimsby Town | 1–1 (4–2 p) | Manchester City U21 | Cleethorpes |
| 19:30 GMT | Simmonds 3'; Khan (yellow card) 42'; Cropper (yellow card) 43'; Green (yellow card) 74'; Maher (yellow card) 90' | Report | Dickson 17'; Charles (yellow card) 64'; Robertson (yellow card) 88' | Stadium: Blundell Park; Attendance: 1,281; Referee: Ben Speedie |
| | Penalties |
| | Holohan (penalty scored); Clifton (penalty scored); Kiernan (penalty scored); Pearson (penalty scored) | | Charles (penalty missed); Katongo (penalty scored); Bobb (penalty missed); Robertson (penalty scored) |

| 22 November 2022 Second round | Grimsby Town | 0–1 | Accrington Stanley | Cleethorpes |
| 19:30 GMT | Morris (yellow card) 65'; Smith (yellow card) 89' | Report | Whalley (yellow card) 56'; Leigh 66' (pen.); Rodgers (yellow card) 90' | Stadium: Blundell Park; Attendance: 703; Referee: Martin Coy |

== First-team squad ==
| # | Name | Nationality | Position | Date of birth (age) | Signed from (Last Club) | Signed in | Contract ends |
Goalkeepers
| 1 | Max Crocombe | (New Zealand) | GK | 12 August 1993 (aged 29) | Melbourne Victory (Australia) | 2021 | 2023 |
| 13 | Ollie Battersby | (England) | GK | 23 July 2001 (aged 21) | Academy | 2017 | 2023 |
Defenders
| 2 | Michee Efete | (Republic of the Congo) | RB | 11 March 1997 (aged 25) | Wealdstone (England) | 2021 | 2024 |
| 3 | Anthony Glennon | (England) | LB | 26 November 1999 (aged 22) | Burnley (England) | 2022 | 2024 |
| 5 | Shaun Pearson | (England) | CB | 29 April 1989 (aged 33) | Wrexham (Wales) | 2021 | 2023 |
| 6 | Luke Waterfall | (England) | CB | 30 July 1990 (aged 32) | Shrewsbury Town (England) | 2019 | 2024 |
| 7 | Josh Emmanuel | (England) | RB | 18 August 1997 (aged 25) | Hull City (England) | 2023 | 2023 |
| 22 | Danny Amos | (England) | LB | 22 December 1999 (aged 22) | Port Vale (England) | 2022 | 2023 |
| 23 | Owen Gallacher | (Scotland) | LB | 6 April 1999 (aged 23) | Crawley Town (England) | 2023 | 2023 |
| 24 | Jaz Goundry | (England) | CB | 12 August 2003 (aged 19) | Academy | 2021 | 2023 |
| 26 | Andy Smith | (England) | CB | 11 September 2001 (aged 20) | Hull City (England) (loan) | 2022 | 2023 |
| 31 | Niall Maher | (England) | CB | 31 July 1995 (aged 27) | FC Halifax Town (England) | 2022 | 2024 |
| 32 | Jordan Cropper | (England) | RB | 12 May 2000 (aged 22) | Burnley (England) | 2022 | 2023 |
| 38 | Jamie Bramwell | (England) | CB | 25 June 2004 (aged 18) | Academy | 2022 | 2023 |
Midfielders
| 4 | Kieran Green | (England) | CM | 30 June 1997 (aged 25) | FC Halifax Town (England) | 2022 | 2024 |
| 8 | Gavan Holohan | (Republic of Ireland) | CM | 15 December 1991 (aged 30) | Hartlepool United (England) | 2022 | 2024 |
| 11 | Otis Khan | (England) | LW | 5 September 1995 (aged 26) | Leyton Orient (England) | 2022 | 2024 |
| 15 | Harry Clifton | (Wales) | CM/RW/LW | 12 June 1998 (aged 24) | Academy | 2007 | 2024 |
| 16 | Alex Hunt | (England) | CM | 29 May 2000 (aged 22) | Sheffield Wednesday (England) | 2022 | 2025 |
| 17 | Bryn Morris | (England) | CM | 26 April 1996 (aged 26) | Burton Albion (England) | 2022 | 2023 |
| 18 | Mikey O'Neill | (England) | LW | 8 June 2004 (aged 18) | Preston North End (England) (loan) | 2023 | 2023 |
| 30 | Evan Khouri | (England) | CM | 21 January 2003 (aged 19) | West Ham United (England) | 2019 | 2024 |
| 34 | Aaron Braithwaite | (England) | CM | 13 October 2003 (aged 18) | Academy | 2022 | 2023 |
| 37 | Harvey Tomlinson | (England) | RW | TBC | Academy | 2020 | 2023 |
| 44 | Sean Scannell | (Republic of Ireland) | RW | 17 September 1990 (aged 31) | Blackpool (England) | 2020 | 2023 |
Attackers
| 9 | George Lloyd | (England) | ST | 11 February 2000 (aged 22) | Cheltenham Town (England) (loan) | 2023 | 2023 |
| 10 | John McAtee | (England) | ST | 23 July 1999 (aged 23) | Luton Town (England) (loan) | 2022 | 2023 |
| 19 | Tom Dickson-Peters | (Scotland) | ST | 16 September 2002 (aged 19) | Norwich City (England) (loan) | 2023 | 2023 |
| 20 | Danilo Orsi-Dadomo | (England) | ST | 16 April 1996 (aged 26) | Harrogate Town (England) | 2022 | 2024 |
| 29 | Ryan Taylor | (England) | ST | 4 May 1988 (aged 34) | Newport County (Wales) | 2021 | 2023 |
| 39 | Edwin Essel | (England) | ST | 11 March 2004 (aged 18) | Academy | 2021 | 2023 |
Players departed during season
| 7 | Jordan Maguire-Drew | (England) | RW | 19 September 1997 (aged 24) | Woking (England) | 2021 | 2023 |
| 10 | John McAtee | (England) | ST | 23 July 1999 (aged 23) | Scunthorpe United (England) | 2021 | 2023 |
| 14 | Stephen Wearne | (England) | RW | 16 December 2000 (aged 21) | Sunderland (England) | 2022 | 2023 |
| 19 | Lewis Richardson | (England) | ST | 7 February 2003 (aged 19) | Burnley (England) (loan) | 2022 | 2023 |
| 21 | Keyendrah Simmonds | (England) | ST | 31 May 2001 (aged 21) | Birmingham City (England) (loan) | 2022 | 2023 |
| 23 | Aribim Pepple | (Canada) | ST | 25 December 2002 (aged 19) | Luton Town (England) (loan) | 2022 | 2023 |
| 27 | Brendan Kiernan | (England) | RW/ST | 10 November 1992 (aged 29) | Walsall (England) (loan) | 2022 | 2023 |
| 35 | Jamie Pardington | (England) | GK | 20 June 2000 (aged 22) | Wolverhampton Wanderers (England) | 2022 | 2023 |

Players' ages are as of the opening day of the 2022–23 season (1 September).
