= Danny Amos (footballer, born 1999) =

English-born Northern Irish footballer

Personal information
- Full name: Daniel Amos
- Date of birth: 22 December 1999 (age 26)
- Place of birth: Sheffield, England
- Height: 5 ft 11 in (1.80 m)
- Position: Left-back

Team information
- Current team: Barrow
- Number: 22

Youth career
- –2016: Doncaster Rovers

Senior career*
| Years | Team | Apps | (Gls) |
| 2016–2021 | Doncaster Rovers | 14 | (0) |
| 2018 | → Buxton (loan) | | |
| 2019 | → Hartlepool United (loan) | 7 | (0) |
| 2021–2022 | Port Vale | 0 | (0) |
| 2022–2024 | Grimsby Town | 51 | (0) |
| 2024 | → York City (loan) | 14 | (0) |
| 2024–2026 | Glentoran | 58 | (5) |
| 2026– | Barrow | 11 | (0) |

International career
| 2017 | Northern Ireland U19 | 2 | (1) |
| 2019–2020 | Northern Ireland U21 | 6 | (0) |
- * Club domestic league appearances and goals as of 17:00, 31 October 2026 (UTC)

Daniel Amos (born 22 December 1999) is a professional footballer who plays as a left-back for National League club Barrow.

Amos has previously represented Northern Ireland at under-19 and under-21 level. He began his career at Doncaster Rovers, turning professional in 2017. He spent time on loan at Buxton and Hartlepool United before signing a short-term contract with Port Vale in September 2021 after being released by Doncaster. He joined Grimsby Town in January 2022. He helped the club to win promotion out of the National League via the play-offs in 2022. He was loaned to York City in February 2024. He moved to Northern Ireland to play for Glentoran in August 2024 and won the County Antrim Shield with the club. He returned to England and joined Barrow in June 2026.

== Club career ==
=== Doncaster Rovers ===
Amos came through the Doncaster Rovers youth team, and made his senior debut on 30 August 2016, coming on as a 71st-minute substitute for Matty Blair in a 2–0 win at Mansfield Town in an EFL Trophy group stage game. He signed his first professional contract in November 2017, keeping him at the club until summer 2019. On 2 February 2018, he joined Northern Premier League Premier Division club Buxton on a one-month loan. Doncaster's under-18 coach Paul Stancliffe said that "getting that experience is what will help him develop". After the loan spell ended, Amos said that "I played every game whilst I was there, and I scored in a derby in my last game which was great".

He made his League One debut on 28 April 2018, playing the full 90 minutes of a 0–0 draw at Oldham Athletic. Manager Darren Ferguson said that "his display was the most pleasing thing to take away from it". He played four matches for "Donny" in the 2017–18 season and was handed the club's Young Player of the Year award. He came on as a second-half substitute on the opening day of the 2018–19 season and said that "I am hoping to get a few starts this season". However, he and Branden Horton had to compete with Danny Andrew for the left-back position, who went on to start every league game of the campaign. Nevertheless, Rovers exercised an option to extend Amos's contract until summer 2020.

On 8 January 2019, Amos joined National League club Hartlepool United on loan until the end of the 2018–19 season. Doncaster boss Grant McCann said that "Richard Money is a good, experienced manager and I'm sure he'll get the best out of Danny. It's a win-win for all parties." Money believed that Amos's arrival would allow him to move Mark Kitching up to midfield. Amos made his "Pools" debut four days later, in a 2–1 FA Trophy defeat to AFC Telford United at Victoria Park, after which Money said that "I thought he was our best player". Amos stated that the loan spell, which saw him feature mainly as a left-wing-back in eight games, meant that "I had to make my own way up to Hartlepool everyday, it was a big task for me which helped me mature and take on more responsibility". Hartlepool manager Craig Hignett ruled out a move to sign Amos in the summer as he felt Doncaster were keen to keep hold of the young left-back.

Speaking in October 2019, Amos said that new manager Darren Moore "really trusts everyone to do well in the team and I think that's good for players like myself... that's a massive boost". On 9 November, he was voted as man of the match for his performance in a 1–1 draw at AFC Wimbledon in the first round of the FA Cup after he provided an assist for Tom Anderson's goal; he was put in the starting line-up after Reece James was ruled out due to illness. Amos started his first league game of the 2019–20 campaign on 20 February following an injury to James. He signed a new one-year deal in July 2020.

Amos made his first league start of the 2020–21 campaign in a 1–0 win over Lincoln City at the Keepmoat Stadium on 31 October. He played the final ten minutes of the club's victory over Championship side Blackburn Rovers in the second round of the FA Cup, which set up a third round tie at West Ham United. He played the last eleven minutes of what would finish as a 4–0 defeat at the London Stadium. He ended the campaign with 13 appearances to his name. Doncaster published their retained list on 14 May 2021 and it was revealed that Amos would be released upon the expiry of his contract on 30 June.

=== Port Vale ===
On 3 September 2021, Amos signed a short-term contract with League Two side Port Vale until January 2022 after impressing manager Darrell Clarke on a two-week trial. He featured in three EFL Trophy games. He failed to dislodge first-team regulars James Gibbons and Dan Jones down the left side and departed the club following the expiry of his contract on 7 January 2022.

=== Grimsby Town ===
On 13 January 2022, Amos signed for National League side Grimsby Town on a deal until the end of the 2021–22 season; manager Paul Hurst said that it was important that the "Mariners" provide competition for Adam Crookes at left-back after Sebastian Revan's loan spell ended. He featured 18 times in the league, helping Grimsby to qualify for the play-offs with a sixth-place finish. Amos played the full 90 minutes of the 2022 National League play-off final as Grimsby beat Solihull Moors 2–1 at the London Stadium to return to the Football League at the first attempt. He was offered a new contract, signing a one-year deal on 28 June.

In November 2022, Amos said, "We're a million miles off where we need to be", and challenged his teammates to change their mindsets and improve their form. He played at left-wing-back in the absence of Anthony Glennon, saying that he was happy to play wherever he was required. On 14 January, he was sent off for a poor challenge on Jacob Wakeling during a 5–0 defeat at Swindon Town. On 7 February, he scored in a 3–0 home win over Championship club Luton Town to secure Grimsby a place in the fifth round of the FA Cup for the first time since 1996. It was his only goal in 31 appearances across the 2022–23 campaign.

On 6 February 2024, Amos joined National League club York City on loan until the end of the 2023–24 season. Manager Neal Ardley said that "his pedigree is exceptional" and that he would provide competition for Thierry Latty-Fairweather and Adam Crookes. He played 14 games for York and was named in the National League Team of the Week for his performance in a 2–0 win over Woking. Amos was released by Grimsby at the end of the 2023–24 season.

=== Glentoran ===
On 30 August 2024, Amos signed for NIFL Premiership side Glentoran. He played in the County Antrim Shield victory over Larne. He signed a contract extension in February 2025, citing his faith in manager Declan Devine, whilst sporting director Paul Millar stated that Amos was "a standout performer at both ends of the pitch". He scored four goals in 38 games in the 2024–25 campaign, including an appearance in the Conference League play-off defeat to Cliftonville following the club's third-place finish. He played in the Northern Ireland Football League Cup final in the 2025–26 season, a 1–0 defeat to Linfield.

=== Barrow ===
On 16 June 2026, Amos returned to English football and signed for recently relegated National League club Barrow. Barrow described him as a left-sided defender capable of playing at left-back or on the left of central defence. Amos made his competitive debut on 8 August, starting at left-back in a 2–0 defeat away to Hartlepool United. On 27 October, he supplied the cross from which Innes Cameron scored Barrow's equaliser as the club recovered from two goals behind to defeat FC Halifax Town 3–2.

== International career ==
Amos was born in Sheffield, England, but became eligible to represent Northern Ireland as his mother came from Belfast. On 29 September 2017, manager Stephen Frail called up Amos to the Northern Ireland under-19 squad for upcoming matches against Poland, Germany and Belarus. He made his debut the opening match against Poland, scoring his side's only goal as they were defeated 2–1 at Stadion Miejski on 4 October. He also played the game against Belarus and Amos said that "we finished third in the table so didn't go through, but scoring in an international and playing in a 55,000 seater stadium was some experience". He was called up to the Northern Ireland under-21 team for the second time in October 2018, having previously been unable to play after picking up an injury following his first call up. He was called up by manager Ian Baraclough for a third time in March 2019 and finally made his under-21 debut in a 1–0 friendly win against Bulgaria in Spain on 22 March. He played five games in the 2021 UEFA European Under-21 Championship qualification campaign.

== Style of play ==
Amos is a left-back who can also play at wing-back. A left-footed player, he has good self-belief and composure.

== Career statistics ==
As of match played 25 April 2026

Appearances and goals by club, season and competition
| Club | Season | League | | | National cup (Note: Includes FA Cup, Irish Cup) | | League cup (Note: Includes Football League Cup, Northern Ireland Football League Cup) | | Other | | Total | |
| Club | Season | Division | Apps | Goals | Apps | Goals | Apps | Goals | Apps | Goals | Apps | Goals |
|---|---|---|---|---|---|---|---|---|---|---|---|---|
| Doncaster Rovers | 2016–17 | League Two | 0 | 0 | 0 | 0 | 0 | 0 | 1 (Note: Appearance(s) in EFL Trophy) | 0 | 1 | 0 |
| Doncaster Rovers | 2017–18 | League One | 3 | 0 | 0 | 0 | 0 | 0 | 1 | 0 | 4 | 0 |
| Doncaster Rovers | 2018–19 | League One | 1 | 0 | 0 | 0 | 0 | 0 | 1 | 0 | 2 | 0 |
| Doncaster Rovers | 2019–20 | League One | 2 | 0 | 1 | 0 | 0 | 0 | 2 | 0 | 5 | 0 |
| Doncaster Rovers | 2020–21 | League One | 8 | 0 | 3 | 0 | 1 | 0 | 1 | 0 | 13 | 0 |
| Doncaster Rovers | Total | | 14 | 0 | 4 | 0 | 1 | 0 | 6 | 0 | 25 | 0 |
| Hartlepool United (loan) | 2018–19 | National League | 7 | 0 | 0 | 0 | — | | 1 (Note: Appearance in FA Trophy) | 0 | 8 | 0 |
| Port Vale | 2021–22 | League Two | 0 | 0 | 0 | 0 | 0 | 0 | 3 | 0 | 3 | 0 |
| Grimsby Town | 2021–22 | National League | 18 | 0 | 0 | 0 | — | | 3 (Note: Appearances in National League promotion play-offs) | 0 | 21 | 0 |
| Grimsby Town | 2022–23 | League Two | 22 | 0 | 3 | 1 | 2 | 0 | 4 | 0 | 31 | 1 |
| Grimsby Town | 2023–24 | League Two | 11 | 0 | 2 | 0 | 0 | 0 | 1 | 0 | 14 | 0 |
| Grimsby Town | Total | | 51 | 0 | 5 | 1 | 2 | 0 | 8 | 0 | 66 | 1 |
| York City (loan) | 2023–24 | National League | 14 | 0 | — | | — | | — | | 14 | 0 |
| Glentoran | 2024–25 | NIFL Premiership | 30 | 4 | 3 | 0 | 4 | 0 | 1 (Note: Appearance in Conference League play-offs) | 0 | 38 | 4 |
| Glentoran | 2025–26 | NIFL Premiership | 28 | 1 | 1 | 0 | 0 | 0 | 0 | 0 | 29 | 1 |
| Glentoran | Total | | 58 | 5 | 4 | 0 | 4 | 0 | 1 | 0 | 67 | 5 |
| Barrow | 2026–27 | National League | 0 | 0 | 0 | 0 | — | | 0 | 0 | 0 | 0 |
| Career total | | | 144 | 5 | 13 | 1 | 7 | 0 | 19 | 0 | 183 | 6 |

== Honours ==
Grimsby Town

- National League play-offs: 2022

Glentoran

- County Antrim Shield: 2024–25
- Northern Ireland Football League Cup runner-up: 2025–26
