= Mikey O'Neill (footballer) =

English association footballer

Personal information
- Full name: Michael O'Neill
- Date of birth: 8 June 2004 (age 22)
- Place of birth: Southport, Merseyside, England
- Position: Midfielder

Team information
- Current team: Ashton United

Youth career
- 2012–2022: Preston North End

Senior career*
Years	Team	Apps	(Gls)
2022–2024	Preston North End	6	(0)
2023	→ Grimsby Town (loan)	11	(0)
2023	→ Southport (loan)	11	(3)
2024	Burnley	0	(0)
2024–2025	Warrington Town	35	(5)
2025–	Ashton United	0	(0)
- * Club domestic league appearances and goals

Michael O'Neill (born 8 June 2004) is an English professional footballer who plays as a midfielder for Southport F.C.

== Career ==
=== Preston North End ===
O'Neill is a youth product of Preston North End, and signed his first scholarship agreement with the club on 9 July 2020 and was awarded Scholar of the Year in 2022 as well as being included in the EFL 'The 11 '. He made his professional debut with Preston North End in a 2–1 EFL Championship win over Queens Park Rangers on 9 April 2022, coming on as a late sub in the 90th minute. One month later, on 10 May, O'Neill signed his first professional contract. Following several appearances from the bench he made his full debut on 7 January 2023 starting and assisting a goal in a 3–1 victory against Huddersfield in the F.A. Cup at Deepdale.

On 14 January 2023, O'Neill joined EFL League Two side Grimsby Town on loan for the remainder of the 2022–23 season.

On 5 September 2023, O'Neill joined National League North side Southport. on loan until 6 January 2024.

=== Burnley ===
On 31 January 2024 O'Neill joined Premier League side Burnley for an undisclosed fee.

On 21 May 2024, the club announced the player would be leaving in the summer.

=== Warrington Town ===
On 8 August 2024, Warrington Town announced they had signed O'Neill from Burnley. O'Neill left Warrington Town in May 2025

=== Ashton United ===
On 8 August 2025, O'Neill joined Northern Premier League Premier Division side Ashton United.

Southport

On 17 November 2026 National League North side Southport announced they had signed O'Neill from Ashton Utd.

== Playing style ==
O'Neill is a creative midfielder who can play as an attacking midfielder, or in a more advanced attacking role. He has experience playing futsal, and is technically very good with the ball.

== Career statistics ==
As of match played 3 February 2024

Appearances and goals by club, season and competition
Club	Season	League			FA Cup		EFL Cup		Other		Total	
Club	Season	Division	Apps	Goals	Apps	Goals	Apps	Goals	Apps	Goals	Apps	Goals
Preston North End	2021–22	Championship	3	0	0	0	0	0	—		3	0
Preston North End	2022–23	Championship	3	0	1	0	1	0	—		5	0
Preston North End	Total		6	0	1	0	1	0	—		8	0
Grimsby Town (loan)	2022–23	League Two	11	0	—		—		—		11	0
Southport (loan)	2023–24	National League North	11	2	1	0	—		1 (Note: Appearances in FA Trophy)	1	13	3
Career total			28	2	2	0	1	0	1	1	32	3
