= Michee Efete =

Congolese footballer (born 1997)

Personal information
- Full name: Michee Efete
- Date of birth: 11 March 1997 (age 29)
- Place of birth: Ealing, England
- Height: 1.80 m (5 ft 11 in)
- Position: Defender

Team information
- Current team: Aldershot Town
- Number: 2

Youth career
- 2010–2012: Crystal Palace
- 2012–2016: Norwich City

Senior career*
Years	Team	Apps	(Gls)
2016–2018	Norwich City	0	(0)
2017	→ Breiðablik (loan)	8	(1)
2017–2018	→ Torquay United (loan)	26	(0)
2018–2019	Maidstone United	8	(0)
2018–2019	→ Bath City (loan)	13	(0)
2019	Billericay Town	17	(0)
2019–2021	Wealdstone	53	(8)
2021–2024	Grimsby Town	80	(6)
2024–2025	Ross County	36	(1)
2025–2026	Yeovil Town	9	(0)
2026–	Aldershot Town	0	(0)

International career
2014	DR Congo U20	1	(0)
- * Club domestic league appearances and goals as of 14:48, 30 January 2026 (UTC)

Michee Efete (born 11 March 1997) is a professional footballer who plays as a defender for National League club Aldershot Town. Born in England, he has represented DR Congo at youth level.

Efete began his career with Norwich City and played for the club's U23 team in the EFL Trophy. He spent a spell playing in the Icelandic Premier Division for Breiðablik before returning to England and playing in Non-League for Torquay United, Maidstone United, Bath City, Billericay Town, Wealdstone and Yeovil Town.

He has been capped at U20 level by Congo.

== Career ==
=== Norwich City ===
Born in London, England, to Congolese parents, Efete joined Crystal Palace as a youngster before joining Norwich City in 2012 as part of their youth academy. He played 25 games for the Under-23s in his side's Premier League 2 campaigns during the 2016–17 and 2017–18 seasons.

On 30 August 2016 he made his debut for Norwich in a 6–1 win over Peterborough United in the EFL Trophy alongside the likes of James Maddison, Todd Cantwell, Josh Murphy and Harry Toffolo. He also played in The Canaries' 5–0 victory over Barnet and 4–1 win over Milton Keynes Dons in the same competition.

In the summer of 2017 he was loaned out to Icelandic Premier Division side Breiðablik where he played 8 games, scoring in a 3–2 win over Víkingur Reykjavík. Upon his return he signed for Torquay United on loan for the 2017–18 season.

=== Non-League ===
Efete was released by Norwich in the summer of 2018 and signed permanently with National League side Maidstone United. In October 2018 he joined Bath City on loan, later moving to Billericay Town on loan in January 2019.

=== Wealdstone ===
In June 2019, Efete signed for Wealdstone. He scored his first goal for the club on 7 September 2019, in a 1–0 win against Oxford City, and netted a total of 7 times as Wealdstone won the National League South title, earning the club promotion to the fifth tier of English football.

Efete signed a new two-year contract with the club in September 2020. On 17 October 2020, Efete scored his first goal at National League level, in Wealdstone's 4–3 victory over Wrexham, and went on to make 22 appearances in 2020-21, although he missed much of the second half of the season due to being placed on furlough. He departed the club at the end of the season.

=== Grimsby Town ===
On 22 June 2021, Efete signed a one-year deal with Grimsby Town, his first professional contract since his Norwich days.

Grimsby secured promotion with victory in the play-off final, though Efete was not in the matchday squad at London Stadium.

On 20 June 2022, Grimsby announced Efete has signed a new two-year contract of their 2022–23 EFL League Two campaign. Efete was part of the Grimsby side that reached the FA Cup quarter finals for the first time since 1939, he played the full 90 minutes of the 2–1 win away at Premier League side Southampton that sealed the achievement.

On 31 January 2024, Efete departed the club having had his contract terminated by mutual consent.

=== Ross County ===
Efete signed a short-term contract with Scottish Premiership club Ross County on 1 February 2024. On 18 June 2024, Ross County announced Efete had signed a new 2-year contract to stay at the club until 2026. In June 2025, Efete left Ross County.

=== Yeovil Town ===
On 16 October 2025, Efete signed a short-term contract with National League club Yeovil Town until the end of the 2025–26 season. On 30 January 2026, Efete left Yeovil Town by mutual consent.

=== Aldershot Town ===
On 12 May 2026, Efete joined National League side, Aldershot Town.

== Career statistics ==
As of match played 10 January 2026

Appearance and goals by club, season and competition
Club	Season	League			National cup (Note: Includes Icelandic Men's Football Cup, FA Cup)		League cup (Note: Includes EFL Cup, Scottish League Cup)		Other		Total	
Club	Season	Division	Apps	Goals	Apps	Goals	Apps	Goals	Apps	Goals	Apps	Goals
Norwich City	2016–17	Championship	0	0	0	0	0	0	0	0	0	0
Norwich City	2017–18	Championship	0	0	0	0	0	0	0	0	0	0
Norwich City	Total		0	0	0	0	0	0	0	0	0	0
Norwich City U23s	2016–17 EFL Trophy		—		—		—		3 (Note: Appearances in the EFL Trophy)	0	3	0
Breiðablik (loan)	2017	Úrvalsdeild	8	1	1	0	0	0	0	0	9	1
Torquay United (loan)	2017–18	National League	26	0	1	0	—		0	0	27	0
Maidstone United	2018–19	National League	8	0	0	0	—		0	0	8	0
Bath City (loan)	2018–19	National League South	13	0	2	0	—		1 (Note: Appearance(s) and goals in FA Trophy)	1	16	1
Billericay Town (loan)	2018–19	National League South	17	0	0	0	—		0	0	17	0
Wealdstone	2019–20	National League South	31	7	5	1	—		1	0	37	8
Wealdstone	2020–21	National League	22	1	1	0	—		3	0	26	1
Wealdstone	Total		53	8	6	1	—		4	0	63	9
Grimsby Town	2021–22	National League	28	3	1	0	—		0	0	29	3
Grimsby Town	2022–23	League Two	39	3	7	1	2	0	2	0	50	4
Grimsby Town	2023–24	League Two	13	0	1	0	1	0	3	0	18	0
Grimsby Town	Total		80	6	9	1	3	0	5	0	97	7
Ross County	2023–24	Scottish Premiership	16	0	0	0	0	0	2 (Note: Appearances in Scottish Premiership play-offs)	0	18	0
Ross County	2024–25	Scottish Premiership	20	1	0	0	4	0	2 (Note: Appearances in Scottish Premiership play-offs)	0	26	1
Ross County	Total		36	1	0	0	4	0	4	0	44	1
Yeovil Town	2025–26	National League	9	0	0	0	—		3 (Note: Two appearances in FA Trophy, one appearance in Somerset Premier Cup)	0	12	0
Aldershot Town	2026–27	National League	0	0	0	0	—		0	0	0	0
Career total			250	16	19	2	7	0	20	1	296	19

== Honours ==
Wealdstone

- National League South: 2019–20

Grimsby Town

- National League play-off winners: 2022
