= Ryan Taylor (footballer, born 1988) =

English footballer

Personal information
- Full name: Ryan Paul Taylor
- Date of birth: 4 May 1988 (age 38)
- Place of birth: Rotherham, England
- Position: Striker

Senior career*
Years	Team	Apps	(Gls)
2005–2011	Rotherham United	131	(21)
2007	→ Burton Albion (loan)	5	(1)
2010	→ Exeter City (loan)	7	(0)
2011–2014	Bristol City	39	(2)
2014–2015	Portsmouth	55	(15)
2015–2017	Oxford United	43	(4)
2017–2020	Plymouth Argyle	89	(11)
2020–2021	Newport County	25	(2)
2021–2023	Grimsby Town	67	(11)
2023–2024	Alfreton Town	25	(1)
Total		486	(68)
- * Club domestic league appearances and goals as of 15:22, 30 April 2024 (UTC)

Ryan Paul Taylor (born 4 May 1988) is an English former professional footballer who played as a striker.

He played for Rotherham United, Burton Albion, Exeter City, Bristol City, Portsmouth, Oxford United, Plymouth Argyle, Newport County, Grimsby Town and Alfreton Town.

== Career ==
=== Rotherham United and loans ===
Born in Rotherham, South Yorkshire, Taylor began his career as a trainee at Rotherham United in July 2005, making his first-team debut as an 81st-minute substitute in a 1–0 home defeat to Swindon Town. He made twelve first-team appearances in the 2006–07 season before glandular fever ruled him out for the rest of the season in November 2006.

Following Rotherham's relegation to League Two at the end of the 2006–07 season, he signed a new two-year contract, and then joined Conference National side Burton Albion on a one-month loan in September 2007. On his return to Rotherham, he established himself in the first team and scored his first goal for Rotherham in a 2–0 win over Shrewsbury Town in November 2007. By the end of the 2007–08 season, Taylor had made 38 appearances for Rotherham, scoring six goals.

Mark Robins twice extended Taylor's contract: in May 2008 and then the following year, each time by one year. This surprised some supporters and critics, who questioned Robins' persistence with the young striker. Ronnie Moore took charge of the Millers again at the start of the 2009–10 season, by which time Taylor had scored 10 goals in almost 100 appearances. In March 2010, Moore sent him out on loan to Exeter City.

Taylor made an immediate impact on the Exeter squad, helping them avoid relegation and receiving Man of the Match awards on several occasions. He returned to his hometown club in time for the play-off finals, where he went straight into the starting line-up on the strength of his performances at Exeter, and scored two goals in the final at Wembley.

=== Bristol City ===
On 20 June 2011, Taylor signed a three-year deal with Championship side Bristol City for an undisclosed fee. He made his Robins debut on 17 August as a late substitute in a 2–1 win at Leicester City; Taylor netted his first goal for the club on 28 April 2012, in a 1–1 away draw against Burnley.

Despite featuring more regularly in his second season, Taylor failed to make an impression, with the Robins being relegated to League One in the process.

=== Portsmouth ===
On 9 January 2014, Taylor left Bristol City and signed an 18-month deal with League Two side Portsmouth, being handed the number 20 shirt. He made his debut for Pompey two days later, starting in a 0–0 draw against Oxford United. On 24 February 2015, Taylor scored two goals in the last 10 minutes to ensure Pompey's comeback against Tranmere Rovers and guide them to a 3–2 win, after Pompey had trailed 0–2.

=== Oxford United ===
On 26 May 2015, Taylor signed for fellow League Two side Oxford United on a two-year deal. He was a first-team regular during the first half of the 2015–16 season, but missed the second half through injury, at the end of which Oxford were promoted to League One. He returned to regular first-team appearances the following season, though often as a substitute. His contract was ended by mutual consent at the end of the January transfer window in 2017, and he signed immediately for Plymouth Argyle, promotion-chasers in League Two. In his one and a half seasons with Oxford, he scored 4 league goals in 43 appearances (19 as substitute), 3 FA Cup goals and once in the Football League Trophy.

=== Plymouth Argyle ===
On 30 January 2017, Taylor signed for League Two side Plymouth Argyle on a free transfer. The 28-year-old forward became Derek Adams' fourth signing of the January transfer window to further bolster the Pilgrims' attacking options going into the crucial final part of their promotion challenge. Taylor made his debut for Argyle on 4 February during a 1–0 away win against Cambridge United, and scored his first goal for the club on his home debut, a 3–0 victory over local rivals Exeter City on 11 February.

Taylor re-signed for Plymouth Argyle at the end of the 2017–18 season. His contract was not renewed by Plymouth Argyle at the end of the COVID-19-affected 2019–20 season.

=== Newport County ===
On 20 August 2020 Taylor joined Newport County on a one-year deal. He made his debut for Newport on 5 September 2020 as a second-half substitute in the 2–0 EFL Cup win against Swansea City. He scored his first goal for Newport County on 12 September 2020 in the 1–1 draw against Scunthorpe United on the first day of the 2020–21 League Two season. Taylor played for Newport in the League Two play-off final at Wembley Stadium on 31 May 2021 which Newport lost to Morecambe, 1-0 after a 107th-minute penalty. On 4 June 2021 it was announced that he would leave Newport County at the end of the season, following the expiry of his contract.

=== Grimsby Town ===
On 22 June 2021, Taylor joined Grimsby Town on a one-year contract. Taylor scored a diving header to make it 3–3 against Wrexham in the National League play-off semi-final, which Grimsby won 5–4 after extra time.

Taylor played in the 2022 National League play-off final as Grimsby beat Solihull Moors 2–1 at the London Stadium to return to the Football League.

On 24 June 2022, Grimsby announced Taylor had signed a new one-year contract for their 2022–23 EFL League Two campaign.

Taylor was part of the Grimsby side that reached the FA Cup quarter-finals for the first time since 1939; he came on as a substitute during the 2–1 win away at Premier League side Southampton that sealed the achievement.

On 9 May 2023, it was announced that Taylor would not be retained for the 2023–24 season and would be leaving the club when his contract expires on 30 June.

=== Alfreton Town and retirement ===
On 21 June 2023, Taylor signed for National League North side Alfreton Town. He scored once in 25 league appearances during the 2023–24 season as Alfreton finished fifth in the National League North, and reached the second round proper of the FA Cup for the first time in over a decade, holding League Two side Walsall to a goalless draw at the Impact Arena before losing the replay. In the play-off eliminator, Alfreton were beaten 5–4 on penalties by Boston United after a goalless draw.

Taylor was offered a new contract for the 2024–25 season, but instead announced his retirement from professional football on 1 July 2024, bringing an end to a career of nearly two decades.

== Career statistics ==
As of 30 April 2024

Club	Season	League		FA Cup		League Cup		Other (Note: Including Football League Trophy, FA Trophy and play-offs.)		Total	
Club	Season	Apps	Goals	Apps	Goals	Apps	Goals	Apps	Goals	Apps	Goals
Rotherham United	2005–06	1	0	—		—		—		1	0
Rotherham United	2006–07	10	0	1	0	1	0	1	0	13	0
Rotherham United	2007–08	35	6	2	0	—		1	0	38	6
Rotherham United	2008–09	32	4	—		3	0	2	0	37	4
Rotherham United	2009–10	19	0	2	0	1	0	4	2	26	2
Rotherham United	2010–11	34	11	2	0	—		1	1	37	12
Rotherham United	Subtotal	131	21	7	0	5	0	9	3	152	24
Burton Albion (loan)	2007–08	5	1	—		—		—		5	1
Burton Albion (loan)	Subtotal	5	1	—		—		—		5	1
Exeter City (loan)	2009–10	7	0	—		—		—		7	0
Exeter City (loan)	Subtotal	7	0	—		—		—		7	0
Bristol City	2011–12	7	1	—		1	0	—		8	1
Bristol City	2012–13	25	1	1	0	—		—		26	1
Bristol City	2013–14	7	0	1	0	—		—		8	0
Bristol City	Subtotal	39	2	2	0	1	0	—		42	2
Portsmouth	2013–14	18	6	—		—		—		18	6
Portsmouth	2014–15	37	9	2	0	1	0	1	1	41	10
Portsmouth	Subtotal	55	15	2	0	1	0	1	1	59	16
Oxford United	2015–16	22	3	2	1	2	0	1	0	27	4
Oxford United	2016–17	21	1	4	2	2	0	4	1	31	4
Oxford United	Subtotal	43	4	6	3	4	0	5	1	58	8
Plymouth Argyle	2016–17	18	4	—		—		—		18	4
Plymouth Argyle	2017–18	21	5	1	0	—		1	1	23	6
Plymouth Argyle	2018–19	33	0	1	0	2	0	1	0	37	0
Plymouth Argyle	2019–20	17	2	—		2	1	1	0	20	3
Plymouth Argyle	Subtotal	89	11	2	0	4	1	3	1	98	13
Newport County	2020–21	25	2	1	0	3	0	4	0	33	2
Newport County	Subtotal	25	2	1	0	3	0	4	0	33	2
Grimsby Town	2021–22	37	8	1	0	—		3	1	41	9
Grimsby Town	2022–23	30	3	2	0	1	0	—		33	3
Grimsby Town	Subtotal	67	11	3	0	1	0	3	1	74	12
Alfreton Town	2023–24	25	1	4	0	—		—		29	1
Alfreton Town	Subtotal	25	1	4	0	—		—		29	1
Career total		486	68	27	3	19	1	25	7	557	79

== Honours ==
Rotherham United

- League Two play-off finalists 2009–10

Newport County

- League Two play-off finalists 2020–21

Grimsby Town

- National League play-off winners: 2022
