= Luke Waterfall =

English footballer (born 1990)

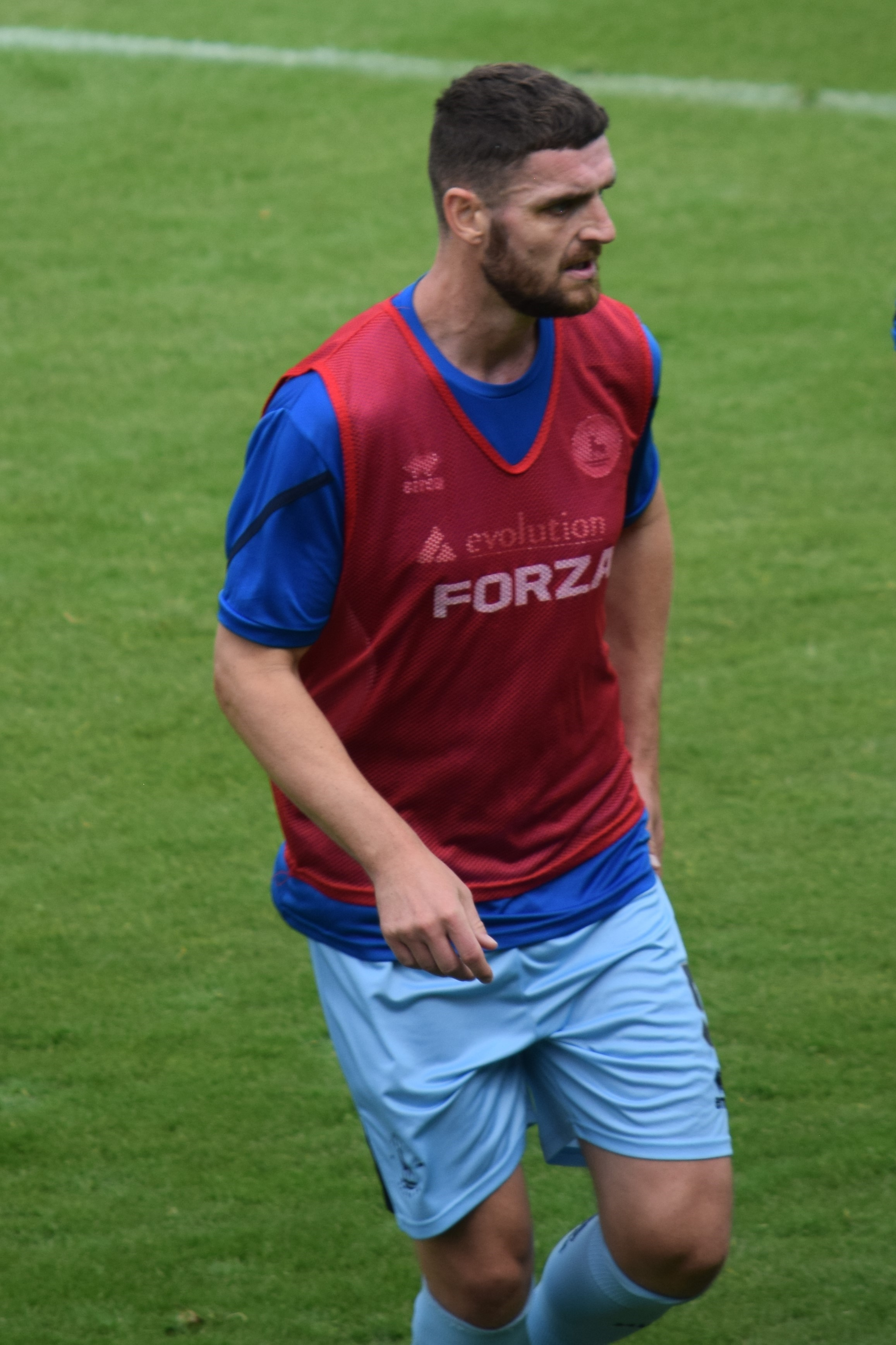
- Waterfall warming up for Hartlepool United in 2024

Personal information
- Full name: Luke Mathew Waterfall
- Date of birth: 30 July 1990 (age 36)
- Place of birth: Sheffield, England
- Height: 6 ft 2 in (1.88 m)
- Position: Centre-back

Team information
- Current team: Boston United (assistant manager)

Youth career
- –2008: Barnsley

Senior career*
Years	Team	Apps	(Gls)
2008–2009	Tranmere Rovers	0	(0)
2008	→ Altrincham (loan)	1	(0)
2009–2010	Ilkeston Town	35	(2)
2010–2013	Gainsborough Trinity	104	(8)
2013–2015	Scunthorpe United	9	(1)
2014	→ Macclesfield Town (loan)	17	(2)
2014–2015	→ Mansfield Town (loan)	5	(0)
2015	Wrexham	9	(1)
2015–2018	Lincoln City	111	(15)
2018–2019	Shrewsbury Town	44	(5)
2019–2024	Grimsby Town	156	(12)
2024–2025	Hartlepool United	42	(2)
2025–2026	Worksop Town	36	(3)
Total		569	(51)
- * Club domestic league appearances and goals as of 19:44, 21 May 2026 (UTC)

Luke Mathew Waterfall (born 30 July 1990) is a former English professional footballer who is assistant manager at National League side Boston United.

He has previously played in the English Football League for Scunthorpe United, Mansfield Town, Lincoln City, Grimsby Town and Shrewsbury Town and at non-league level for Altrincham, Ilkeston Town, Gainsborough Trinity, Macclesfield Town, Wrexham, Hartlepool United and Worksop Town. He was part of the Lincoln team that won the National League and FA Trophy and the Grimsby Town team that was promoted to the EFL via the play-offs in 2022. He also reached the FA Cup quarter finals with both clubs in 2017 and 2023.

== Career ==
=== Early career ===
Born in Sheffield, South Yorkshire, Waterfall started his career with Barnsley and was a regular for their youth and reserve teams in the 2007–08 season. After being released, he signed for League One club Tranmere Rovers on 18 July 2008 after a successful trial. He made his debut on 12 August after coming on as a 63rd-minute substitute in a 2–0 defeat away to Grimsby Town in the League Cup. He made his first start on 2 September in a 1–0 victory over Accrington Stanley in the Football League Trophy.

He joined Conference Premier club Altrincham on 14 October 2008 on loan, and made one appearance in the league as a substitute and three cup starts. He was released by Tranmere at the end of 2008–09.

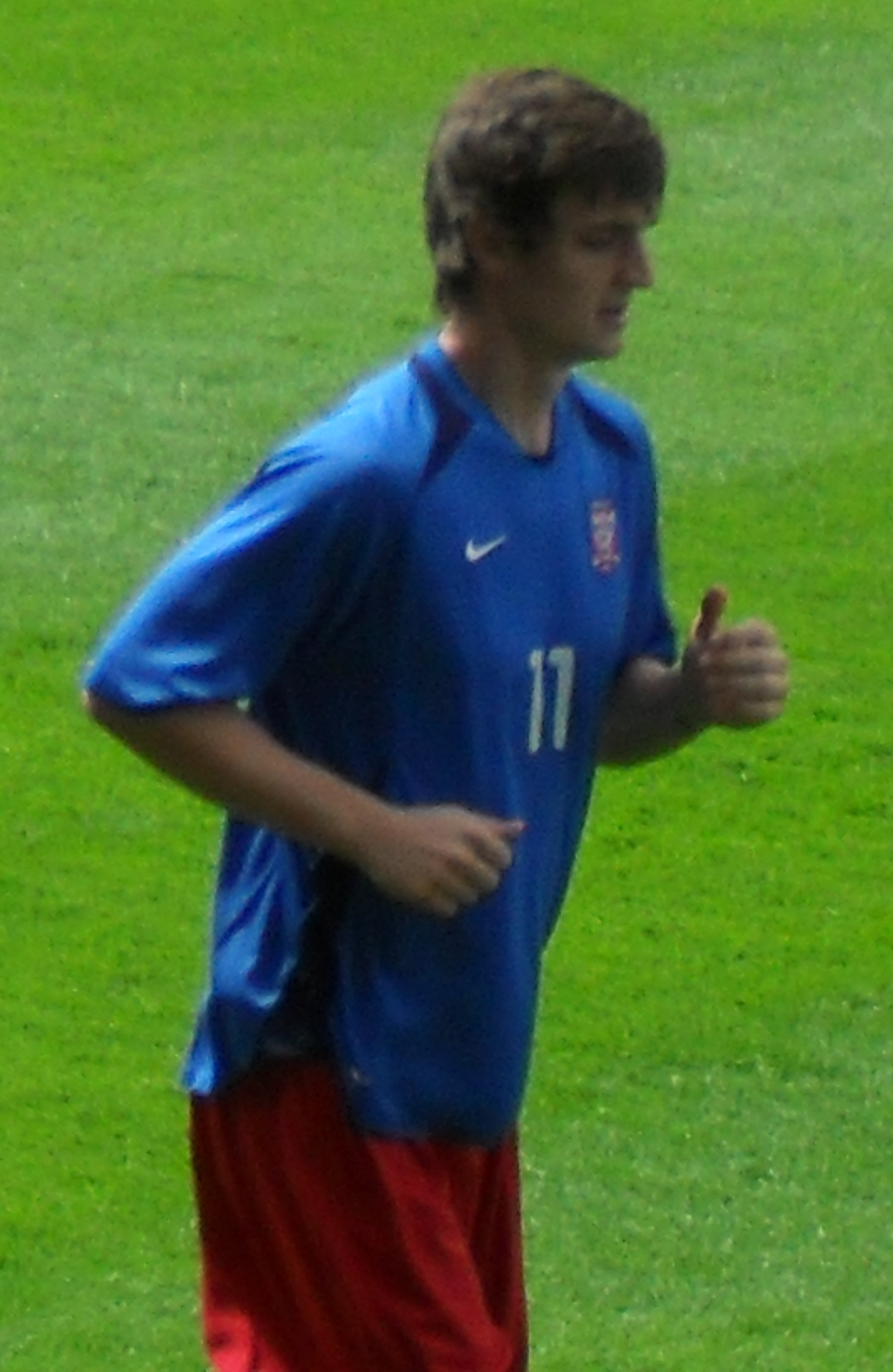
Waterfall warming up for York City in 2009

He had unsuccessful trials with Conference Premier clubs Oxford United and York City before signing for Conference North club Ilkeston Town in August 2009 after a successful trial. He finished 2009–10 with 43 appearances and two goals. He signed for Ilkeston's divisional rivals Gainsborough Trinity in May 2010.

=== Scunthorpe United ===
Waterfall signed for newly relegated League Two club Scunthorpe United on 4 June 2013 on a one-year contract for an undisclosed fee. On 5 August 2014, he moved to League Two Macclesfield Town on a one-month loan, with manager John Askey requiring him to cover during the search for a new defender, with several trialists failing to be up to his standard. On 7 November, he moved to Mansfield Town on loan until January 2015. He made seven appearances for The Stags before his loan expired.

=== Wrexham ===
Waterfall signed for Conference Premier club Wrexham on 15 January 2015 on a one-and-a-half-year contract. Wrexham approached him late into negotiations with two unnamed clubs, causing Waterfall to "make an easy decision" by signing for The Dragons.

=== Lincoln City ===
He spent only half a season with Wrexham before signing for their National League rivals Lincoln City on 2 June on a two-year contract. He was appointed club captain. Waterfall made 55 appearances and scored seven goals in 2016–17 as Lincoln were promoted to EFL League Two as National League champions, as well as leading Lincoln to the quarter-finals of the FA Cup by defeating Guiseley, Altrincham, Oldham Athletic, Ipswich Town and Brighton & Hove Albion before defeating Premier League side Burnley. The Imps were eventually beaten 5–0 by Arsenal.

On 5 April 2018, Waterfall as captain lifted the EFL Trophy as the Imps defeated Shrewsbury Town at Wembley Stadium. Several months later Shrewsbury would meet Waterfall's release clause and convince him to sign for the Shropshire side. Waterfall thanked Lincoln fans and called the decision to leave the "toughest decision" of his career, saying a three-year contract and League One football was too good to turn down.

=== Shrewsbury Town ===
Waterfall signed for League One club Shrewsbury Town by on 7 August 2018 on a three-year contract for an undisclosed fee. After only one season with The Shrews His contract with the club was terminated by mutual consent on 15 August 2019.

=== Grimsby Town ===
The same day, Waterfall signed for League Two club Grimsby Town on a two-year contract.

Ian Holloway was replaced as manager by Paul Hurst, but neither could prevent Grimsby from being relegated back to the National League at the end of the 2020–21 season.

On 28 May 2022, Waterfall scored twice including a 119th minute winner in extra-time of the semi-final play-off against Wrexham at the Racecourse Ground, helping Grimsby win 5–4 to reach the final. Waterfall captained the Mariners in the 2022 National League play-off final as Grimsby beat Solihull Moors 2–1 at the London Stadium to return to the Football League.

Waterfall was voted into the National League Team of the Season for the 2021–22 season, alongside teammate John McAtee. On 17 June 2022, Waterfall signed a new two-year contract to keep him at Blundell Park until the summer of 2024.

Waterfall was part of the Grimsby team that reached the FA Cup quarter-finals for the first time since 1939, mirroring the progress he made with Lincoln in 2016. He played the full 90 minutes of the 2–1 win away at Premier League side Southampton that secured that achievement.

=== Hartlepool United ===
On 25 January 2024, it was announced that Waterfall had signed for Hartlepool United. Early in his Hartlepool career, he formed a strong centre-back partnership with Tom Parkes.

He was named as Hartlepool's club captain at the start of the 2023–24 season. In August 2024, he received red cards in successive home matches. At the end of the 2024–25 season, it was announced that he would be released by Hartlepool at the end of his contract.

=== Worksop Town ===
On 9 June 2025, Waterfall joined recently promoted Worksop Town of National League North on an 18-month deal.

== Coaching career ==
On 1 June 2026, Waterfall cancelled his contract with Worksop Town to join National League club Boston United as assistant manager to Paul Hurst, Waterfall's former manager at Grimsby Town.

== Career statistics ==
As of match played 25 April 2026

Appearances and goals by club, season and competition
Club	Season	League			FA Cup		League Cup		Other		Total	
Club	Season	Division	Apps	Goals	Apps	Goals	Apps	Goals	Apps	Goals	Apps	Goals
Tranmere Rovers	2008–09	League One	0	0	0	0	1	0	1 (Note: Appearance in Football League Trophy)	0	2	0
Altrincham (loan)	2008–09	Conference Premier	1	0	—		—		2 (Note: Appearances in Conference League Cup)	0	3	0
Ilkeston Town	2009–10	Conference North	35	2	5	0	—		3 (Note: Appearance(s) in FA Trophy)	0	43	2
Gainsborough Trinity	2010–11	Conference North	36	1	1	0	—		1	0	38	1
Gainsborough Trinity	2011–12	Conference North	27	3	0	0	—		4 (Note: One appearance in FA Trophy, three in Conference North play-offs)	0	31	3
Gainsborough Trinity	2012–13	Conference North	41	4	2	0	—		8	1	51	5
Gainsborough Trinity	Total		104	8	3	0	—		13	1	120	9
Scunthorpe United	2013–14	League Two	9	1	1	0	0	0	0	0	10	1
Scunthorpe United	2014–15	League One	0	0	—		—		—		0	0
Scunthorpe United	Total		9	1	1	0	0	0	0	0	10	1
Macclesfield Town (loan)	2014–15	Conference Premier	17	2	—		—		—		17	2
Mansfield Town (loan)	2014–15	League Two	5	0	2	0	—		—		7	0
Wrexham	2014–15	Conference Premier	9	1	—		—		5	0	14	1
Lincoln City	2015–16	National League	36	6	3	0	—		1	0	40	6
Lincoln City	2016–17	National League	44	7	9	0	—		2	0	55	7
Lincoln City	2017–18	League Two	30	2	1	0	0	0	10 (Note: Eight appearances and one goal in EFL Trophy, two appearances in League Two play-offs)	1	41	3
Lincoln City	2018–19	League Two	1	0	—		—		—		1	0
Lincoln City	Total		111	15	13	0	0	0	13	1	137	16
Shrewsbury Town	2018–19	League One	44	5	7	1	1	0	1 (Note: Appearance in EFL Trophy)	0	53	6
Shrewsbury Town	2019–20	League One	0	0	—		1	0	—		1	0
Shrewsbury Town	Total		44	5	7	1	2	0	1	0	54	6
Grimsby Town	2019–20	League Two	30	2	2	1	0	0	1	0	33	3
Grimsby Town	2020–21	League Two	33	1	1	0	1	0	1	0	36	1
Grimsby Town	2021–22	National League	42	7	1	0	—		3 (Note: Appearances in National League play-offs)	2	46	9
Grimsby Town	2022–23	League Two	40	2	6	0	2	1	0	0	48	3
Grimsby Town	2023–24	League Two	11	0	1	0	1	0	1	0	14	0
Grimsby Town	Total		156	12	11	1	4	1	6	2	177	16
Hartlepool United	2023–24	National League	15	1	0	0	0	0	0	0	15	1
Hartlepool United	2024–25	National League	27	1	1	0	0	0	1	0	29	1
Hartlepool United	Total		42	2	1	0	0	0	1	0	44	2
Worksop Town	2025–26	National League North	36	3	1	0	—		2	1	39	4
Career total			565	51	44	2	7	1	47	5	667	59

== Honours ==
Wrexham

- FA Trophy runner-up: 2014–15

Lincoln City

- National League: 2016–17
- EFL Trophy: 2017–18

Grimsby Town

- National League play-offs: 2022

Individual

- National League Team of the Season: 2021–22
