= Gavan Holohan =

Irish footballer

Personal information
- Date of birth: 15 December 1991 (age 34)
- Place of birth: Kilkenny, Ireland
- Height: 5 ft 10 in (1.78 m)
- Position: Midfielder

Team information
- Current team: Boston United

Youth career
- –2008: Kilkenny City
- 2008–2012: Hull City

Senior career*
Years	Team	Apps	(Gls)
2012–2013	Alfreton Town	0	(0)
2013–2014	Drogheda United	31	(5)
2015–2016	Cork City	38	(3)
2017	Galway United	27	(6)
2018	Waterford	30	(5)
2019–2022	Hartlepool United	95	(20)
2022–2024	Grimsby Town	88	(11)
2024–2026	Crawley Town	35	(1)
2026	Hartlepool United	6	(0)
2026–	Boston United	0	(0)
- * Club domestic league appearances and goals as of 23:16, 3 March 2026 (UTC)

Gavan Holohan (born 15 December 1991) is an Irish professional footballer who plays as a midfielder for National League club Boston United.

Beginning his career as a youngster with Hull City, Holohan returned to his native Ireland where he featured for League of Ireland sides Drogheda United, Cork City, Galway United and Waterford. He joined Hartlepool United in 2019 and in 2021 he was part of their side that won promotion back to the Football League. He repeated the success the following season with Grimsby Town. After leaving Grimsby in 2024, Holohan joined newly promoted EFL League One side Crawley Town who he spent two years with before re-joining Hartlepool United. He was released by Hartlepool in 2026, signing for Boston United.

== History ==
=== Hull City ===
Holohan came through the ranks with Kilkenny City in his native Ireland and was picked up by Hull City in 2008. He went on to spend the next four years with the Tigers but failed to make an appearance, only making the bench once for an FA Cup tie against Wigan Athletic.

=== Alfreton Town ===
Holohan was signed by Alfreton Town in 2012 following his release from Hull. He also trialled with Carlisle United and Hibernian.

=== Drogheda United ===
After being released by Alfreton, Holohan signed for League of Ireland side Drogheda United. Holohan enjoyed a successful campaign in the 2014 season, scoring 8 goals in 32 games and winning the supporters' player of the year award. He helped Drogheda progress to the quarter-finals of the FAI Cup by scoring 3 goals in 3 games but was one of three Drogheda players sent off in their exit against the eventual champions Derry City.

=== Cork City ===
In November 2014, Holohan left to sign for Cork City. During his two years at Cork, Holohan won the FAI Cup in 2016 and scored in the President of Ireland's Cup final to help his side win 2–0.

=== Galway United ===
Holohan later joined Galway United and scored his first career hat trick in a 4–1 win over his former side Drogheda United.

=== Waterford ===
After suffering relegation with Galway United, Holohan signed for Waterford following their promotion to the top flight. He helped the club finish fourth and while this would have qualified the club for the Europa League first qualifying round, Waterford were ruled by UEFA to have not passed the "three-year rule" as the club were reformed in 2016.

=== Hartlepool United ===
Holohan signed with English National League club Hartlepool United on a short-term contract in 2019. Having had to wait for international clearance before being able to play, Holohan eventually broke into the first team and scored his first goal in English football in a 1–1 draw against Aldershot Town in April 2019, an equaliser which ultimately relegated his opponents. Holohan impressed in the seven games that he played and did enough to earn an extended contract.

In the 2019–20 season, Holohan scored nine goals and contributed seven assists. Holohan then signed a contract until the end of the 2021–22 season due to this good form.

Holohan scored his 10th goal of the 2020–21 season in a 2–0 win against Notts County. This goal was also his fourth consecutive goal after scoring against Stockport County, Dagenham & Redbridge, Boreham Wood, and Notts County respectively. He was awarded the League's Player of the Month award for April 2021. Holohan started in the 2021 National League play-off final as Hartlepool were promoted back to the Football League.

In August 2021, Holohan scored Hartlepool's first goal back in the Football League in a 1–0 victory over Crawley Town. In a 2–1 win over rivals Carlisle United, Holohan scored his final goal for Hartlepool. This would subsequently be voted as League Two goal of the month for August. Holohan struggled for game time during the 2021–22 season and departed after making 108 appearances and scoring 23 times.

=== Grimsby Town ===
On 22 March 2022, Holohan signed a two-year deal with National League side Grimsby Town. On 23 May 2022, with Grimsby trailing 1–0 to Notts County in the National League play-offs in the final minute of added on time, Holohan scored an equaliser to send the game to extra time, with Grimsby going on to win the game 2-1 and advancing to the semi-finals.

Holohan played in the 2022 National League play-off final as Grimsby beat Solihull Moors 2–1 at the London Stadium to return to the Football League. During an FA Cup fourth round tie at Championship side Luton Town, Holohan scored the opening goal in a 2–2 draw.

On 1 March 2023, he scored two penalties in a 2–1 victory at Premier League side Southampton in the fifth round of the FA Cup, securing Grimsby's first quarter-final appearance since 1939.

Holohan was released at the end of the 2023–24 season.

=== Crawley Town ===
Holohan joined Crawley on a free transfer in July 2024 after his release from Grimsby Town joining former teammate Toby Mullarkey, also from Grimsby, who joined on the same day. Holohan initially struggled for game time at Crawley and didn't make his first appearance for the club until October 2024 in a 4–3 home defeat against AFC Wimbledon in the EFL Trophy. He made his first league appearance four days later in a 5–3 defeat against Shrewsbury Town. Holohan made 41 appearances in all competitions across two seasons with Crawley, scoring once in a 4–0 away win against Rotherham United.

=== Hartlepool United ===
In January 2026, Holohan rejoined Hartlepool on a free transfer. On 6 May 2026 the club announced he was being released.

=== Boston United ===
Holohan signed for fellow National League side Boston United in May 2026 on a one-year contract.

== Career statistics ==
As of 3 March 2026

Appearances and goals by club, season and competition
Club	Season	Division	League		National Cup		League Cup		Other		Total	
Club	Season	Division	Apps	Goals	Apps	Goals	Apps	Goals	Apps	Goals	Apps	Goals
Drogheda United	2013	LOI Premier Division	4	0	0	0	0	0	0	0	4	0
Drogheda United	2014	LOI Premier Division	27	5	3	3	2	0	0	0	32	8
Drogheda United	Total		31	5	3	3	2	0	0	0	36	8
Cork City	2015	LOI Premier Division	18	1	1	0	1	0	0	0	20	1
Cork City	2016	LOI Premier Division	20	2	2	0	2	1	3	1	27	4
Cork City	Total		38	3	3	0	3	1	3	1	47	5
Galway United	2017	LOI Premier Division	27	6	1	0	3	1	0	0	31	7
Waterford	2018	LOI Premier Division	30	5	1	1	2	0	0	0	33	6
Hartlepool United	2018–19	National League	7	1	0	0	0	0	0	0	7	1
Hartlepool United	2019–20	National League	29	8	4	1	0	0	0	0	34	9
Hartlepool United	2020–21	National League	40	9 (Note: Holohan's goal against Aldershot Town on 3 October 2020 has been incorrectly attributed to Rhys Oates on Soccerway and Soccerbase.)	2	1	0	0	4	1	46	11
Hartlepool United	2021–22	League Two	18	2	4	0	0	0	0	0	22	2
Hartlepool United	Total		95	20	10	2	0	0	4	1	109	23
Grimsby Town	2021–22	National League	9	2	0	0	0	0	3	1	12	3
Grimsby Town	2022–23	League Two	39	6	7	3	2	0	3	0	51	9
Grimsby Town	2023–24	League Two	40	3	2	0	1	0	1	0	44	3
Grimsby Town	Total		88	11	9	3	3	0	7	1	107	14
Crawley Town	2024–25	League One	21	1	2	0	0	0	1	0	24	1
Crawley Town	2025–26	League Two	14	0	1	0	1	0	1	0	17	0
Crawley Town	Total		35	1	3	0	1	0	2	0	41	1
Hartlepool United	2025–26	National League	6	0	0	0	0	0	0	0	6	0
Career total			350	51	30	9	14	2	16	3	410	65

== Honours ==
Cork City

- FAI Cup: 2016

Hartlepool United

- National League play-offs: 2021

Grimsby Town

- National League play-offs: 2022

Individual

- Drogheda United Supporters' Player of the Year: 2014
- National League Player of the Month: April 2021
