= Tom Dickson-Peters =

Scottish footballer (born 2002)

Personal information
- Full name: Thomas Grant Delroy Dickson-Peters
- Date of birth: 16 September 2002 (age 24)
- Position: Striker

Youth career
- 2017–2022: Norwich City

Senior career*
Years	Team	Apps	(Gls)
2022–2023	Norwich City	0	(0)
2022	→ Gillingham (loan)	9	(0)
2023	→ Grimsby Town (loan)	4	(1)
2023	→ Woking (loan)	1	(0)
2024	Whitehawk	2	(0)
2024	Lancing	7	(0)
2024–2025	Alfold	1	(0)
2025	Uxbridge	0	(0)

International career
2018–2019	Scotland U17	10	(2)
2019	Scotland U18	1	(0)
2022–2023	Scotland U21	3	(0)
- * Club domestic league appearances and goals as of 10:32, 17 April 2025 (UTC)

Thomas Grant Delroy Dickson-Peters (born 16 September 2002) is a Scottish semi-professional footballer who last played as a striker for Uxbridge and the Scotland U21 national team.

== Club career ==
After playing youth football with Norwich City, Dickson-Peters signed on loan for League One side Gillingham on 4 January 2022. Dickson-Peters made his debut for the Kent side on 8 January 2022 as a 45th-minute substitute in a 4–0 loss to Ipswich Town. The following week, while still out on loan, he signed a new long-term contract with Norwich City until the summer of 2025. He signed for Grimsby Town on loan in January 2023. In September 2023, Dickson-Peters went and signed for National League club Woking on a one-month loan deal. Following his return from the loan deal at Woking, Dickson-Peters was released from his Norwich City contract by mutual consent in November 2023.

In July 2024, Dickson-Peters joined Isthmian League Premier Division side Whitehawk following a successful trial period. but left in September after just two appearances. Following a brief spell with Whitehawk, Dickson-Peters subsequently joined Lancing in October. He went onto feature seven times for the club before leaving a month later. He then subsequently had stints at Alfold and Uxbridge between December and January.

== International career ==
Dickson-Peters has represented Scotland at youth international level.

== Career statistics ==
As of match played 28 December 2024

Appearances and goals by club, season and competition
Club	Season	League			FA Cup		EFL Cup		Other		Total	
Club	Season	Division	Apps	Goals	Apps	Goals	Apps	Goals	Apps	Goals	Apps	Goals
Norwich City U21	2019–20	—			—		—		1 (Note: Appearances in the EFL Trophy)	0	1	0
Norwich City U21	2020–21	—			—		—		2	0	2	0
Norwich City U21	Total		—		—		—		3	0	3	0
Norwich City	2021–22	Premier League	0	0	0	0	0	0	—		0	0
Norwich City	2022–23	Championship	0	0	0	0	0	0	—		0	0
Norwich City	2023–24	Championship	0	0	0	0	0	0	—		0	0
Norwich City	Total		0	0	0	0	0	0	—		0	0
Gillingham (loan)	2021–22	League One	9	0	—		—		—		9	0
Grimsby Town (loan)	2022–23	League Two	4	1	0	0	—		—		4	1
Woking (loan)	2023–24	National League	1	0	0	0	—		0	0	1	0
Whitehawk	2024–25	Isthmian League Premier Division	2	0	1	0	—		0	0	3	0
Lancing	2024–25	Isthmian League South East Division	7	0	—		—		—		7	0
Alfold	2024–25	Southern Combination League Division One	1	0	—		—		—		1	0
Uxbridge	2024–25	Isthmian League South Central Division	0	0	—		—		—		0	0
Career total			24	1	1	0	0	0	3	0	28	1
