= Luis Adlard =

English footballer (born 2002)

Personal information
- Full name: Luis Samuel Adlard
- Date of birth: October 2002 (age 24)
- Place of birth: Grimsby, England
- Position: Forward

Team information
- Current team: Floreat Athena

Youth career
- Grimsby Town

Senior career*
Years	Team	Apps	(Gls)
2019–2022	Grimsby Town	3	(0)
2021	→ Frickley Athletic (loan)	4	(0)
2021	→ Cleethorpes Town (loan)	3	(1)
2021–2022	→ Bridlington Town (loan)	5	(2)
2022–2026	Grimsby Borough	35	(3)
2026–	Floreat Athena	0	(0)
- * Club domestic league appearances and goals as of 15:41, 18 October 2023 (UTC)

Luis Samuel Adlard (born October 2002) is an English professional footballer who plays as a forward for Floreat Athena.

He played professionally for Grimsby Town between 2019 and 2022, spending time on loan with non-league sides Frickley Athletic, Cleethorpes Town and Bridlington Town.

== Career ==
=== Grimsby Town ===
Adlard joined Grimsby Town at under-9 level. On 3 September 2019, Adlard made his debut for Grimsby in a 2–1 EFL Trophy defeat against Scunthorpe United.

On 24 September 2021, Adlard signed for Frickley Athletic on a one-month loan along with fellow Grimsby player Jaz Goundry. He made his debut the following day in a 2–1 defeat against Pickering Town.

On 12 November 2021, Adlard was loaned out for a second time during the 2021–22 season by joining Cleethorpes Town for an initial one month. On 13 November 2021, Adlard scored his first goal in senior football as he came off the bench to score in a 4–0 win over Yorkshire Amateur.

On 24 December 2021, Adlard signed for Bridlington Town on a one-month loan, again linking him up with fellow Mariners player Jaz Goundry. Adlard's only goal for Bridlington came in a 2–2 draw away against Lincoln United. On 25 January 2021, Adlard had his loan extended by a further month.

Grimsby secured promotion with victory in the play-off final, though Adlard was not in the matchday squad at London Stadium.

On 11 June 2022, the club announced their retained list ahead of the 2022–23 season and confirmed that Adlard would be among those released when his contract expires on 30 June.

=== Grimsby Borough ===
Adlard joined Grimsby Borough and made his debut in a pre-season game against Hedon Rangers.

=== Floreat Athena ===
In January 2026, Adlard left Grimsby Borough and moved to Australia. He subsequently joined Western Australian club Floreat Athena, where he was primarily used as a defender.

Adlard scored as Floreat defeated Inglewood United 4–1 in the 2026 State League Night Series final. He also scored league goals against UWA Nedlands and Curtin University during the campaign. On 15 August, he scored the winning goal in a 2–1 victory over Mandurah City which secured Floreat the 2026 State League Division One championship and promotion back to the NPL Western Australia.

== Career statistics ==
As of 27 June 2021

Appearances and goals by club, season and competition
Club	Season	League			FA Cup		League Cup		Other		Total	
Club	Season	Division	Apps	Goals	Apps	Goals	Apps	Goals	Apps	Goals	Apps	Goals
Grimsby Town	2019–20	League Two	0	0	0	0	0	0	1 (Note: Appearance(s) in Football League Trophy)	0	1	0
Grimsby Town	2020–21	League Two	3	0	0	0	0	0	0	0	3	0
Career total			3	0	0	0	0	0	1	0	4	0
