= John McAtee =

English footballer (born 1999)

Personal information
- Full name: John George McAtee
- Date of birth: 23 July 1999 (age 27)
- Place of birth: Salford, England
- Height: 1.80 m (5 ft 11 in)
- Position: Forward

Team information
- Current team: Bolton Wanderers
- Number: 45

Youth career
- 2015–2017: Shrewsbury Town

Senior career*
Years	Team	Apps	(Gls)
2017–2019	Shrewsbury Town	1	(0)
2017	→ Halesowen Town (loan)	10	(4)
2018	→ AFC Telford United (loan)	7	(1)
2018	→ Ashton United (loan)	9	(1)
2018	→ AFC Telford United (loan)	2	(0)
2018–2019	→ Curzon Ashton (loan)	19	(1)
2019–2021	Scunthorpe United	49	(4)
2021–2022	Grimsby Town	37	(14)
2022–2024	Luton Town	0	(0)
2022–2023	→ Grimsby Town (loan)	26	(4)
2023–2024	→ Barnsley (loan)	40	(12)
2024–	Bolton Wanderers	69	(13)
- * Club domestic league appearances and goals as of 12:11, 18 August 2026 (UTC)

John George McAtee (born 23 July 1999) is an English footballer who plays as a striker for EFL Championship club Bolton Wanderers.

He has previously played for Shrewsbury Town where he began his career, taking in loan spells with Halesowen Town, AFC Telford United, Ashton United and Curzon Ashton. He joined Scunthorpe United in 2019 where he remained for two seasons before joining Grimsby Town in the summer of 2021. McAtee was pivotal in Grimsby's promotion back to the Football League in 2022, scoring several goals in their play-off campaign before signing for Luton Town during the summer.

== Club career ==
=== Shrewsbury Town ===
McAtee made his first appearance for the Shrewsbury Town first-team ahead of his second year as a scholar, in a pre-season friendly away at Stourbridge in July 2016. He made his English Football League debut as an 84th-minute substitute for Ryan Yates in a 2–0 loss at Oxford United on the final day of the 2016–17 season, and subsequently signed a one-year professional contract, committing him to the club until summer 2018.

McAtee joined Halesowen Town on an initial one-month youth loan on 30 September 2017. This was later extended until Christmas 2017, with "Yeltz" manager John Hill eager to extend it further again, however he returned to his parent club, before being loaned out to National League North club AFC Telford United in February 2018.

On 4 August 2018, McAtee joined National League North side Ashton United on a one-month loan deal. Afterwards, on 26 September, McAtee was loaned out again for the rest of the season, back to Telford. However, on 21 December, he was loaned for a month to Curzon Ashton, again of the same league. The deal was later extended for the rest of the season. He was released by Shrewsbury in May 2019.

=== Scunthorpe United ===
On 8 July 2019, McAtee signed for League Two side Scunthorpe United.

He scored his first league goal for the club on 18 January 2020, an equaliser in a 2–2 draw away at Bradford City.

=== Grimsby Town ===
On 8 June 2021, McAtee turned down a new contract with Scunthorpe to join local rivals Grimsby Town on a two-year deal, reuniting him with manager Paul Hurst for a third time. it is understood that Grimsby would have to pay a compensation fee for the player.

McAtee scored on his Mariners debut in a 1–0 win over Weymouth on 28 August 2021. McAtee was awarded both the "Player of the Year" and the "Young Player of the Year" awards following on from his first season with Grimsby.

McAtee scored Grimsby's first goal in a 5–4 away victory over Wrexham in the National League play off semi-final. He also scored the first goal in the 2–1 victory over Solihull Moors in the 2022 National League play-off final to send Grimsby back to the Football League.

=== Luton Town ===
On 2 August 2022, McAtee signed for EFL Championship club Luton Town for an undisclosed fee, returning to Grimsby Town on loan until the end of the 2022–23 season in order to continue his development.

McAtee suffered a shoulder injury following the opening day of the season, initially dislocating it against Leyton Orient which would end up needing surgery. On 1 November 2022, McAtee played his first football in months as he scored twice for Luton's development side in a 3–3 friendly with Stevenage.

McAtee was part of the Grimsby team that reached the quarter-finals of the FA Cup and although being cup tied in the fourth-round game against Luton, he would play in the 2–1 victory away at Premier League side Southampton and the eventual defeat against Brighton & Hove Albion.

Following an injury with three games to go, manager Paul Hurst stated McAtee had played his final game for the club ahead of his move to Luton, stating "He's been great and we've been great for him. He's needed managing at times, and he'll accept that, but he's got great character. Myself and Chris have put a lot of trust, time, and effort into him going back to Shrewsbury and Scunthorpe as well as here because we believed in him. Last season, in particular, he repaid some of that faith and got a reward for an excellent season. I really hope that he can prove himself at Luton or certainly higher up than he has played currently because he has got the ability, he just has to show that dedication, work extremely hard, not take anything for granted and be disappointed when things aren't quite going his way."

Following Luton's promotion to the Premier League, McAtee was named as a substitute for the clubs opening day defeat against Brighton & Hove Albion.

On 25 August 2023, McAtee joined EFL League One club Barnsley on a season-long loan. McAtee came off the bench to score on his debut in a 2–0 win away at Wigan Athletic.

=== Bolton Wanderers ===
On 9 August 2024, McAtee signed for Bolton Wanderers for an undisclosed fee on a three-year contract.

== Personal life ==
McAtee is the older brother of Nottingham Forest midfielder James McAtee. He is from Walkden. Their father, paternal grandfather (also both called John) and great-uncles played rugby league professionally, and the football players and managers Alan Ball Sr. and Alan Ball Jr. are their maternal great-grandfather and great-uncle respectively.

== Career statistics ==
As of match played 15 August 2026

Appearances and goals by club, season and competition
Club	Season	League			FA Cup		EFL Cup		Other		Total	
Club	Season	Division	Apps	Goals	Apps	Goals	Apps	Goals	Apps	Goals	Apps	Goals
Shrewsbury Town	2016–17	League One	1	0	0	0	0	0	0	0	1	0
Shrewsbury Town	2017–18	League One	0	0	0	0	0	0	0	0	0	0
Shrewsbury Town	2018–19	League One	0	0	0	0	0	0	1 (Note: Appearance(s) in EFL Trophy)	0	1	0
Shrewsbury Town	Total		1	0	0	0	0	0	1	0	2	0
Halesowen Town (loan)	2017–18	Northern Premier League Premier Division	10	4	0	0	—		2 (Note: One appearance and one goal in the Birmingham Senior Cup; one appearance and one goal in NPL Challenge Cup)	2	12	6
AFC Telford United (loan)	2017–18	National League North	7	1	0	0	—		0	0	7	1
Ashton United (loan)	2018–19	National League North	9	1	0	0	—		0	0	9	1
AFC Telford United (loan)	2018–19	National League North	2	0	0	0	—		0	0	2	0
Curzon Ashton (loan)	2018–19	National League North	19	1	0	0	—		0	0	19	1
Scunthorpe United	2019–20	League Two	19	3	0	0	1	0	6	0	26	3
Scunthorpe United	2020–21	League Two	30	1	1	1	0	0	1	0	32	2
Scunthorpe United	Total		49	4	1	1	1	0	7	0	58	5
Grimsby Town	2021–22	National League	37	14	0	0	—		3 (Note: Appearances in the National League play-offs)	2	40	16
Luton Town	2022–23	Championship	0	0	0	0	0	0	0	0	0	0
Luton Town	2023–24	Premier League	0	0	0	0	0	0	—		0	0
Luton Town	Total		0	0	0	0	0	0	0	0	0	0
Grimsby Town (loan)	2022–23	League Two	26	4	4	0	0	0	1	0	31	4
Barnsley (loan)	2023–24	League One	40	12	2	2	0	0	3 (Note: One appearance and one goal in EFL Trophy, two appearances in League One play-offs)	1	45	15
Bolton Wanderers	2024–25	League One	45	11	1	0	3	0	6	1	55	12
Bolton Wanderers	2025–26	League One	23	2	0	0	1	0	8 (Note: Five appearances and two goals in EFL Trophy; three appearances in League One play-offs)	2	32	4
Bolton Wanderers	2026–27	Championship	1	0	0	0	1	0	—		2	0
Bolton Wanderers	Total		69	13	1	0	5	0	14	3	89	16
Career total			269	54	8	3	6	0	31	8	314	65

== Honours ==
Grimsby Town

- National League play-offs: 2022

Bolton Wanderers

- EFL League One play-offs: 2026

Individual

- Grimsby Town Player of the Year: 2021–22
- Grimsby Town Young Player of the Year: 2021–22
