= Anthony Glennon =

English footballer (born 1999)

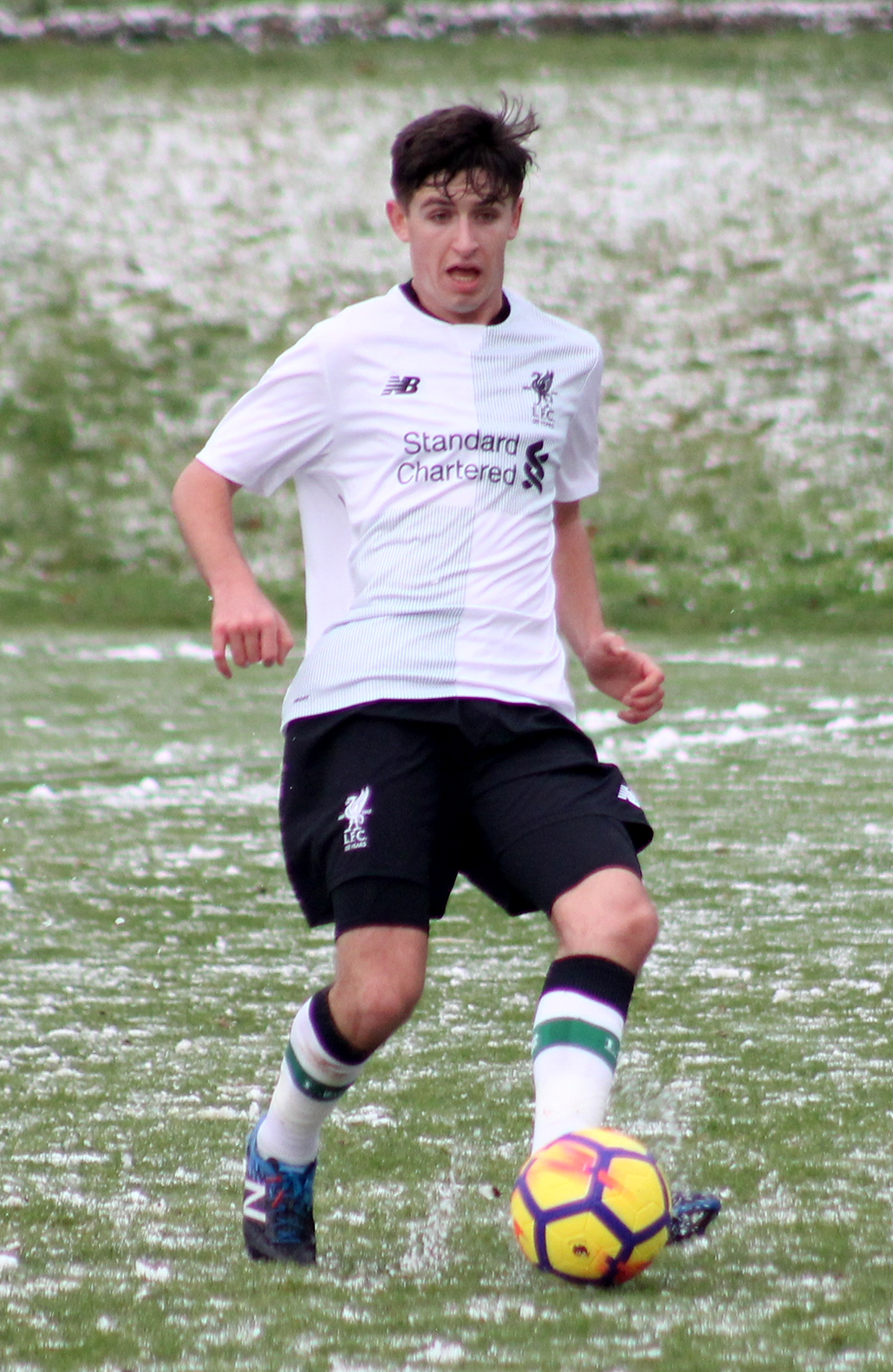
- Glennon playing for Liverpool U18s in 2017

Personal information
- Full name: Anthony David Driscoll-Glennon
- Date of birth: 26 November 1999 (age 26)
- Place of birth: Bootle, England
- Height: 5 ft 11 in (1.81 m)
- Position: Left back

Youth career
- 2006–2018: Liverpool
- 2018–2019: Burnley

Senior career*
Years	Team	Apps	(Gls)
2019–2022	Burnley	0	(0)
2020	→ Grimsby Town (loan)	12	(1)
2022	→ Barrow (loan)	15	(0)
2022–2024	Grimsby Town	46	(2)
2024–2026	Newport County	60	(1)
- * Club domestic league appearances and goals as of 17:33, 13 July 2026 (UTC)

Anthony David Driscoll-Glennon (born 26 November 1999) is an English professional footballer who plays as a left back.

Glennon played youth football for Liverpool and Burnley. He made his professional debut during a loan spell with Grimsby Town in 2020 and also spent time on loan at Barrow. He made three Cup appearances for Burnley before returning to Grimsby Town on a permanent deal in July 2022.

== Career ==
=== Liverpool ===
Born in Bootle, Merseyside, Glennon started his football career playing for local youth side Croxteth Park, alongside Trent Alexander-Arnold. He joined Liverpool's Academy at the age of six and spent over a decade at the club, progressing through the youth levels to the under-18 squad under Neil Critchley after leaving school. He picked up a few knocks in his first season in the under-18 side, which kept him out of action and he struggled to find a place in the squad until late on in the season. He had to wait until 18 February 2017 to make his first start, when he was drafted in to the line-up against Wolverhampton Wanderers after injuries to others. Critchley was promoted to under-23 boss in the summer of 2017 and replaced by Reds legend Steven Gerrard, but Glennon built up a good relationship with the new boss. However, Glennon didn't impress enough to earn a professional contract and was released at the end of the season.

=== Burnley ===
He moved on to sign for Premier League side Burnley in July 2018, after impressing on trial. He was appointed as captain of the under-23 side by manager Steve Stone shortly after his arrival at Turf Moor, and the club made great improvements in their second season in the Professional Development League. On 25 July 2019, he signed a two-year extended contract with option of a further year at Turf Moor following an impressive first season in the under-23 squad, as well as being named on the first team bench for a Premier League game against Manchester City in April. On 7 January 2020, he became manager Ian Holloway's first signing when he joined EFL League Two side Grimsby Town on loan until the end of the season. The move materialised as Holloway had worked with Burnley's chief operating officer Matt Williams when he was at Blackpool, doing a lot of his scouting. Holloway was in desperate need of a left-back and trusted Williams so much that he didn't even watch Glennon play himself before the move was completed.

He moved on loan to Barrow in January 2022. On 10 June 2022, Burnley announced Glennon would leave the club at the end of the month when his contract expired.

=== Grimsby Town ===
On 29 June 2022, Glennon signed for former team Grimsby Town, where he had previously played on loan, on a two-year deal.

Glennon was part of the Grimsby team that reached the FA Cup quarter final for the first time since 1939, he played the full 90 minutes of the 2–1 win away at Premier League side Southampton that secured that achievement.

He was released following the conclusion of the 2023–24 season.

=== Newport County ===
On 26 June 2024 Glennon signed a two-year deal with League Two club Newport County, effective from 1 July. He made his debut for Newport on 10 August 2024 in the 3-2 EFL League Two defeat to Cheltenham Town. He scored his first goal for Newport on 2 November 2024 in the 4-2 FA Cup first round defeat to Peterborough United.

He was released by the club at the end of the 2025–26 season.

== Career statistics ==
As of match played 21 March 2026

Appearances and goals by club, season and competition
Club	Season	League			FA Cup		EFL Cup		Other		Total	
Club	Season	Division	Apps	Goals	Apps	Goals	Apps	Goals	Apps	Goals	Apps	Goals
Burnley	2019–20	Premier League	0	0	0	0	0	0	—		0	0
Burnley	2020–21	Premier League	0	0	2	0	1	0	—		3	0
Burnley	2021–22	Premier League	0	0	—		0	0	—		0	0
Burnley	Total		0	0	2	0	1	0	0	0	3	0
Grimsby Town (loan)	2019–20	League Two	12	1	—		—		—		12	1
Barrow (loan)	2021–22	League Two	15	0	1	1	—		—		16	1
Grimsby Town	2022–23	League Two	31	2	5	1	1	0	2 (Note: Appearance(s) in EFL Trophy)	0	39	3
Grimsby Town	2023–24	League Two	15	0	3	0	1	0	2	0	21	0
Grimsby Town	Total		46	2	8	1	2	0	4	0	60	3
Newport County	2024–25	League Two	39	0	1	1	1	0	2	0	43	1
Newport County	2025–26	League Two	21	1	0	0	2	0	2	0	25	1
Newport County	Total		60	1	1	1	3	0	4	0	68	2
Career total			133	4	12	3	6	0	8	0	159	7
