= Jordan Maguire-Drew =

English footballer (born 1997)

Personal information
- Full name: Jordan Luke Maguire-Drew
- Date of birth: 19 September 1997 (age 29)
- Place of birth: Crawley, England
- Height: 5 ft 11 in (1.80 m)
- Position: Midfielder

Team information
- Current team: Horsham YM

Youth career
- –2016: Brighton & Hove Albion

Senior career*
Years	Team	Apps	(Gls)
2016–2019	Brighton & Hove Albion	0	(0)
2016	→ Worthing (loan)	6	(8)
2016–2017	→ Dagenham & Redbridge (loan)	42	(14)
2017	→ Lincoln City (loan)	12	(0)
2018	→ Coventry City (loan)	3	(0)
2018	→ Wrexham (loan)	17	(3)
2019–2021	Leyton Orient	58	(12)
2021	→ Crawley Town (loan)	17	(1)
2021	Woking	7	(1)
2021–2023	Grimsby Town	23	(6)
2022–2023	→ Yeovil Town (loan)	3	(1)
2023–2024	Yeovil Town	27	(3)
2023–2024	→ Barnet (loan)	12	(0)
2024–2025	Weymouth	19	(0)
2025	Whitehawk	11	(3)
2025	Lewes	5	(0)
2025–2026	East Grinstead Town	10	(0)
2026–	Horsham YM	0	(0)
- * Club domestic league appearances and goals as of 18:50, 19 March 2026 (UTC)

Jordan Luke Maguire-Drew (born 19 September 1997) is an English professional footballer who plays as a midfielder for Southern Combination Premier Division club Horsham YM.

Beginning his career with Brighton & Hove Albion, he has also played in the Football League for Lincoln City, Coventry City, Leyton Orient, Crawley Town and Grimsby Town. He has had spells at Non-league level for Worthing, Dagenham & Redbridge, Wrexham, Woking, Yeovil Town, Barnet and Weymouth.

== Career ==
=== Brighton & Hove Albion ===
Maguire-Drew was born in Crawley, West Sussex. As a child he played for local side Oakwood F.C. before being offered a trial at the youth team of Brighton & Hove Albion where he signed a two-year scholarship. In April 2016, whilst still an under-18 player, he joined local Isthmian League Division One South side Worthing on a youth loan until the end of the season. He scored an impressive eight goals in six games, helping Worthing to win the play-offs and promotion as they beat Faversham Town in the final.

In July 2016, he signed his first professional contract with Brighton, and later in the month he signed for National League side Dagenham & Redbridge on loan for an initial six-month period. He scored on his debut for the club in a 3–0 win against Southport on the first day of the season. In January 2017, the loan was extended until the end of the season after scoring eight goals in twenty-nine appearances. He continued to remain a first team regular and helped Dagenham to a fifth-place finish where they eventually lost out to Forest Green Rovers in the play-off semi-finals. He made a total of forty-eight appearances for the Daggers, scoring sixteen times and won the Young Player of the Year award.

In July 2017, he signed for newly promoted EFL League Two side Lincoln City on a season-long loan deal. He made his league debut in the 2–2 draw with Wycombe Wanderers, replacing Josh Ginnelly as a second-half substitute. In January 2018 he joined another League Two team, Coventry City, on a half-season loan.

On 1 August 2018, he joined Wrexham on loan for the 2018–19 season. He made his debut for the club on the opening day of the 2018–19 season during a 1–0 victory over Dover Athletic. He returned to Brighton in December 2018.

=== Leyton Orient ===
In January 2019, he joined Leyton Orient on a two-year deal for an undisclosed fee. Maguire-Drew was part of the Orient side that won the National League and finished runners-up in the FA Trophy.

He joined Crawley Town on loan until the end of the season on 18 January 2021.

At the end of the 2020–21 season, Maguire-Drew was released by Orient and at the end of his tenure with the O's said "I can't speak highly enough of my time at Orient, but I was a bit disappointed with how it ended,"

=== Woking ===
Maguire-Drew joined Woking in August 2021, following a short-term trial period. He went onto feature seven times, scoring once for The Cards before leaving the club three months later via mutual consent.

=== Grimsby Town ===
On 29 November 2021, Maguire-Drew signed an 18-month contract with Grimsby Town. On 5 June 2022, Maguire-Drew scored a 111th-minute winner as Grimsby defeated Solihull Moors in the 2022 National League play-off final to secure an immediate return to the Football League.

=== Yeovil Town ===
On 16 December 2022, Maguire-Drew signed for National League side Yeovil Town on an initial one-month loan deal, with the club announcing that personal terms had been agreed to sign him permanently during the January transfer window, subject to the completion of a satisfactory medical. Shortly after the announcement by Yeovil, Grimsby denied that any deal was in place for Maguire-Drew to join on a permanent basis and stipulated that a one-month loan was the only thing agreed, but stated that informal talks over a permanent deal had happened. A month later Maguire-Drew officially departed Grimsby by mutual consent, and subsequently joined Yeovil Town permanently signing an 18-month contract.

On 22 December 2023, Maguire-Drew joined National League side Barnet on loan until the end of the 2023–24 season, with the option of a free permanent transfer subject to terms.

=== Weymouth ===
In September 2024, Maguire-Drew had his contract mutually terminated with Yeovil and subsequently signed for National League South side Weymouth.

=== Whitehawk ===
Maguire-Drew joined Whitehawk in February 2025.

=== Lewes ===
On 2 July 2025, Maguire-Drew joined Isthmian League Premier Division side Lewes.

=== East Grinstead Town ===
In December 2025, Maguire-Drew joined Isthmian League South East Division club East Grinstead Town.

== Personal life ==
Maguire-Drew supports Arsenal.

== Career statistics ==
As of match played 15 November 2025

Appearances and goals by club, season and competition
Club	Season	League			FA Cup		League Cup		Other		Total	
Club	Season	Division	Apps	Goals	Apps	Goals	Apps	Goals	Apps	Goals	Apps	Goals
Brighton & Hove Albion	2015–16	Championship	0	0	0	0	0	0	0	0	0	0
Brighton & Hove Albion	2016–17	Championship	0	0	0	0	0	0	0	0	0	0
Brighton & Hove Albion	2017–18	Premier League	0	0	0	0	0	0	0	0	0	0
Brighton & Hove Albion	2018–19	Premier League	0	0	0	0	0	0	0	0	0	0
Brighton & Hove Albion	Total		0	0	0	0	0	0	0	0	0	0
Worthing (loan)	2015–16	IL Division One South	6	8	0	0	—		2 (Note: Appearance(s) in Isthmian League play-offs)	3	8	11
Dagenham & Redbridge (loan)	2016–17	National League	42	14	3	1	—		3 (Note: Two appearances and one goal in National League play-offs, one in FA Trophy)	1	48	16
Lincoln City (loan)	2017–18	League Two	11	0	0	0	1	0	2 (Note: Appearance(s) in EFL Trophy)	2	14	2
Coventry City (loan)	2017–18	League Two	3	0	1	0	0	0	0	0	4	0
Wrexham (loan)	2018–19	National League	17	3	2	0	—		0	0	19	3
Leyton Orient	2018–19	National League	12	3	0	0	—		4 (Note: Appearance(s) in FA Trophy)	0	16	3
Leyton Orient	2019–20	League Two	33	7	1	0	0	0	4	0	38	7
Leyton Orient	2020–21	League Two	13	2	1	0	1	0	4	0	19	2
Leyton Orient	Total		58	12	2	0	1	0	12	0	73	12
Crawley Town (loan)	2020–21	League Two	17	1	0	0	0	0	0	0	17	1
Woking	2021–22	National League	7	1	0	0	—		0	0	7	1
Grimsby Town	2021–22	National League	16	5	0	0	—		2 (Note: Appearances in National League play-offs)	1	18	6
Grimsby Town	2022–23	League Two	7	1	0	0	1	0	2	0	10	1
Grimsby Town	Total		23	6	0	0	1	0	4	1	28	7
Yeovil Town (loan)	2022–23	National League	3	1	—		—		1	0	4	1
Yeovil Town	2022–23	National League	16	2	—		—		0	0	16	2
Yeovil Town	2023–24	National League South	11	1	2	1	—		1	0	14	2
Yeovil Town	2024–25	National League	0	0	0	0	—		0	0	0	0
Yeovil Town	Total		27	3	2	1	—		1	0	30	4
Barnet (loan)	2023–24	National League	12	0	—		—		0	0	12	0
Weymouth	2024–25	National League South	19	0	4	0	—		0	0	23	0
Whitehawk	2024–25	IL Premier Division	11	3	0	0	—		0	0	11	3
Lewes	2025–26	IL Premier Division	5	0	0	0	—		0	0	5	0
Career total			261	52	14	2	3	0	25	7	303	61

== Honours ==
Coventry City

- EFL League Two play-offs: 2018

Leyton Orient

- National League: 2018–19
- FA Trophy runner-up: 2018–19

Grimsby Town

- National League play-offs: 2022
