= 2022 National League play-off final =

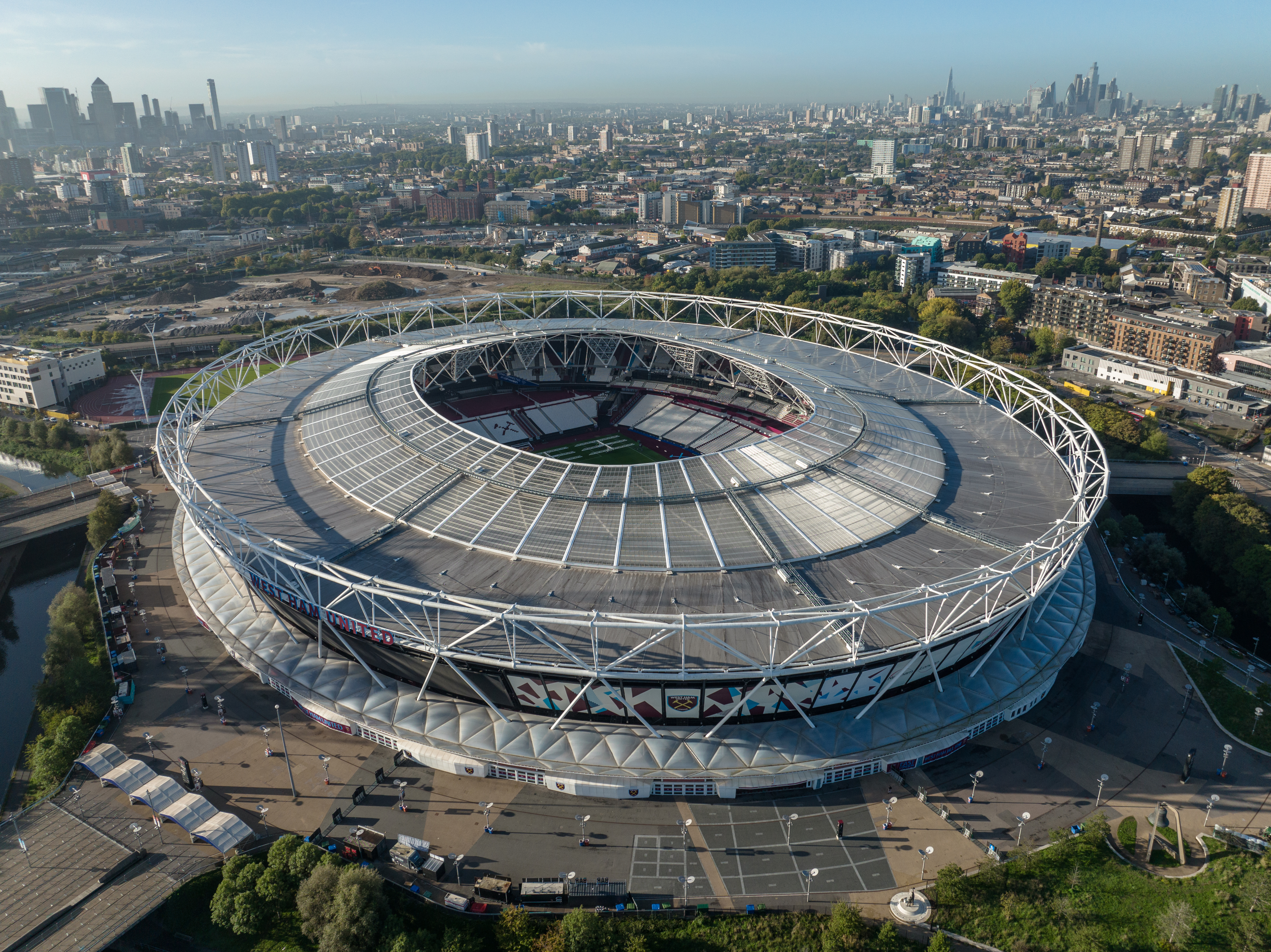
- The match took place at London Stadium
- Event: 2021–22 National League
Solihull Moors	Grimsby Town
1	2
- After extra time
- Date: 5 June 2022
- Venue: London Stadium, London
- Referee: Martin Woods
- Attendance: 22,897

The 2022 National League play-off final, known as the Vanarama National League Promotion Final for sponsorship reasons, was an association football match played on 5 June 2022 at the London Stadium between Solihull Moors and Grimsby Town. It determined the second and final team to gain promotion from the National League, English football's fifth tier, to EFL League Two. By finishing first in the 2021–22 National League, Stockport County gained automatic promotion to League Two, while the teams placed from second to seventh participated in the play-offs. The winners of the semi-finals competed for the final promotion spot for League Two. The losing play-off quarter-finalists were Notts County and FC Halifax Town. In the following round, Chesterfield and Wrexham were eliminated in the semi-finals.

The match was televised live on BT Sport 1 HD and BT Sport Ultimate. The coverage was presented by Matt Smith, while the commentary team comprised Adam Summerton and Kevin Davies. Radio commentary was provided by Switch Radio and BBC Radio Humberside.

== Ticketing ==
The National League were criticised before the game for their ticketing policy which resulted in a minimum ticket price of £40. Following complaints the league’s sponsor, Vanarama, gave £20,000 to both clubs to help supporters with costs. In addition 13,000 Grimsby fans were able to watch the game following intervention by the Mariners Trust supporters group which raised money for tickets.

== Route to the final ==
Solihull won both regular season meetings between the two sides, 2–0 at home and 2–1 away.

National League final table, leading positions
Pos	Team	Pld	W	D	L	GF	GA	GD	Pts
1	Stockport County	44	30	4	10	87	38	+49	94
2	Wrexham	44	26	10	8	91	46	+45	88
3	Solihull Moors	44	25	12	7	83	45	+38	87
4	FC Halifax Town	44	25	9	10	62	35	+27	84
5	Notts County	44	24	10	10	81	52	+29	82
6	Grimsby Town	44	23	8	13	68	46	+22	77
7	Chesterfield	44	20	14	10	69	51	+18	74

=== Quarter-finals ===
23 May 2022	Notts County	1–2 (a.e.t.)	Grimsby Town	Meadow Lane, Nottingham
19:45	Rodrigues 73'	Report	Holohan 90+6'; Dieseruvwe 119'	Attendance: 12,023; Referee: Sunny Sukhvir Gill

24 May 2022	FC Halifax Town	1–2	Chesterfield	The Shay, Halifax
19:45	Stenson 68'	Report	Rowe 19'; King 66'	Attendance: 5,661; Referee: Scott Tallis

=== Semi-finals ===
28 May 2022	Wrexham	4–5 (a.e.t.)	Grimsby Town	Racecourse Ground, Wrexham
12:30	Mullin 13' (pen.), 65'; Tozer 63'; Davies 80'	Report	McAtee 15'; Waterfall 47', 119'; Taylor 72'; Dieseruvwe 78'	Attendance: 9,734; Referee: Adam Herczeg

29 May 2022	Solihull Moors	3–1	Chesterfield	Damson Park, Solihull
12:30	Dallas 15'; Gudger 35'; Howe 59'	Report	Quigley 7'	Attendance: 4,026; Referee: Thomas Kirk

=== Details ===
5 June 2022
15:00 BST

Solihull Moors	1–2 (a.e.t.)	Grimsby Town
Hudlin 45+1'	Report	McAtee 69'; Maguire-Drew 111'

London Stadium, London
Attendance: 22,897
Referee: Martin Woods

GK	18	(England) Joe McDonnell
RB	2	(Republic of Ireland) James Clarke
CB	5	(England) Callum Howe
CB	6	(England) Alex Gudger
LB	14	(England) Harry Boyes
CM	4	(England) Kyle Storer (c)
CM	8	(England) Callum Maycock	(substituted off) 114'
RW	7	(England) Joe Sbarra	(substituted off) 109'
CAM	11	(England) Ryan Barnett
LW	19	(Scotland) Andrew Dallas	(substituted off) 116'
CF	27	(England) Kyle Hudlin	(substituted off) 59'
Substitutes:
GK	26	(England) Jack Myatt
DF	12	(England) Reiss McNally	(substituted on) 116'
DF	22	(England) Mark Ellis	(substituted on) 114'
MF	15	(England) Callum Reilly	(substituted on) 109'
FW	24	(England) Danny Newton	(substituted on) 59'
Manager:
(England) Neal Ardley

GK	21	(New Zealand) Max Crocombe
RB	32	(England) Jordan Cropper
CB	6	(England) Luke Waterfall
CB	26	(England) Andy Smith
LB	22	(Northern Ireland) Danny Amos
CM	4	(England) Ben Fox
CM	28	(Republic of Ireland) Gavan Holohan	(substituted off) 101'
RW	18	(Portugal) Érico Sousa	(substituted off) 66'
CAM	10	(England) John McAtee	(substituted off) 90'
LW	15	(Wales) Harry Clifton
CF	29	(England) Ryan Taylor	(substituted off) 81'
Substitutes:
DF	5	(England) Shaun Pearson
MF	17	(England) Arjan Raikhy	(substituted on) 90'
FW	25	(England) Jordan Maguire-Drew	(substituted on) 66'
FW	9	(England) Tristan Abrahams	(substituted on) 101'
FW	12	(England) Emmanuel Dieseruvwe	(substituted on) 81'
Manager:
(England) Paul Hurst
