= List of Olympic medalists in diving =

This is the complete list of Olympic medalists in diving.

== Current program ==
=== Men ===
==== 10 metre platform ====
Games	Gold	Silver	Bronze
1904 St. Louis	George Sheldon; United States	Georg Hoffmann; Germany	Frank Kehoe; United States
1908 London	Hjalmar Johansson; Sweden	Karl Malmström; Sweden	Arvid Spångberg; Sweden
1912 Stockholm	Erik Adlerz; Sweden	Albert Zürner; Germany	Gustaf Blomgren; Sweden
1920 Antwerp	Clarence Pinkston; United States	Erik Adlerz; Sweden	Harry Prieste; United States
1924 Paris	Albert White; United States	David Fall; United States	Clarence Pinkston; United States
1928 Amsterdam	Pete Desjardins; United States	Farid Simaika; Egypt	Michael Galitzen; United States
1932 Los Angeles	Harold Smith; United States	Michael Galitzen; United States	Frank Kurtz; United States
1936 Berlin	Marshall Wayne; United States	Elbert Root; United States	Hermann Stork; Germany
1948 London	Samuel Lee; United States	Bruce Harlan; United States	Joaquín Capilla; Mexico
1952 Helsinki	Samuel Lee; United States	Joaquín Capilla; Mexico	Günther Haase; Germany
1956 Melbourne	Joaquín Capilla; Mexico	Gary Tobian; United States	Richard Connor; United States
1960 Rome	Bob Webster; United States	Gary Tobian; United States	Brian Phelps; Great Britain
1964 Tokyo	Bob Webster; United States	Klaus Dibiasi; Italy	Tom Gompf; United States
1968 Mexico City	Klaus Dibiasi; Italy	Álvaro Gaxiola; Mexico	Win Young; United States
1972 Munich	Klaus Dibiasi; Italy	Richard Rydze; United States	Giorgio Cagnotto; Italy
1976 Montreal	Klaus Dibiasi; Italy	Greg Louganis; United States	Vladimir Aleynik; Soviet Union
1980 Moscow	Falk Hoffmann; East Germany	Vladimir Aleynik; Soviet Union	David Ambartsumyan; Soviet Union
1984 Los Angeles	Greg Louganis; United States	Bruce Kimball; United States	Li Kongzheng; China
1988 Seoul	Greg Louganis; United States	Xiong Ni; China	Jesús Mena; Mexico
1992 Barcelona	Sun Shuwei; China	Scott Donie; United States	Xiong Ni; China
1996 Atlanta	Dmitri Sautin; Russia	Jan Hempel; Germany	Xiao Hailiang; China
2000 Sydney	Tian Liang; China	Hu Jia; China	Dmitri Sautin; Russia
2004 Athens	Hu Jia; China	Mathew Helm; Australia	Tian Liang; China
2008 Beijing	Matthew Mitcham; Australia	Zhou Lüxin; China	Gleb Galperin; Russia
2012 London	David Boudia; United States	Qiu Bo; China	Tom Daley; Great Britain
2016 Rio de Janeiro	Chen Aisen; China	German Sanchez; Mexico	David Boudia; United States
2020 Tokyo	Cao Yuan; China	Yang Jian; China	Tom Daley; Great Britain
2024 Paris	Cao Yuan; China	Rikuto Tamai; Japan	Noah Williams; Great Britain
2028 Los Angeles			

===== Medal table =====
Rank	Nation	Gold	Silver	Bronze	Total
1	United States	13	10	9	32
2	China	6	5	4	15
3	Italy	3	1	1	5
4	Sweden	2	2	2	6
5	Mexico	1	3	2	6
6	Australia	1	1	0	2
7	Russia	1	0	2	3
8	East Germany	1	0	0	1
9	Germany	0	3	2	5
10	Soviet Union	0	1	2	3
11	Egypt	0	1	0	1
11	Japan	0	1	0	1
13	Great Britain	0	0	4	4
Totals (13 entries)		28	28	28	84

==== 3 metre springboard ====
Games	Gold	Silver	Bronze
1908 London	Albert Zürner; Germany	Kurt Behrens; Germany	George Gaidzik; United States
1908 London	Albert Zürner; Germany	Kurt Behrens; Germany	Gottlob Walz; Germany
1912 Stockholm	Paul Günther; Germany	Hans Luber; Germany	Kurt Behrens; Germany
1920 Antwerp	Louis Kuehn; United States	Clarence Pinkston; United States	Louis Balbach; United States
1924 Paris	Albert White; United States	Pete Desjardins; United States	Clarence Pinkston; United States
1928 Amsterdam	Pete Desjardins; United States	Michael Galitzen; United States	Farid Simaika; Egypt
1932 Los Angeles	Michael Galitzen; United States	Harold Smith; United States	Richard Degener; United States
1936 Berlin	Richard Degener; United States	Marshall Wayne; United States	Alan Greene; United States
1948 London	Bruce Harlan; United States	Miller Anderson; United States	Samuel Lee; United States
1952 Helsinki	David Browning; United States	Miller Anderson; United States	Bob Clotworthy; United States
1956 Melbourne	Bob Clotworthy; United States	Donald Harper; United States	Joaquín Capilla; Mexico
1960 Rome	Gary Tobian; United States	Samuel Hall; United States	Juan Botella; Mexico
1964 Tokyo	Kenneth Sitzberger; United States	Frank Gorman; United States	Lawrence Andreasen; United States
1968 Mexico City	Bernard Wrightson; United States	Klaus Dibiasi; Italy	Jim Henry; United States
1972 Munich	Vladimir Vasin; Soviet Union	Giorgio Cagnotto; Italy	Craig Lincoln; United States
1976 Montreal	Phil Boggs; United States	Giorgio Cagnotto; Italy	Aleksandr Kosenkov; Soviet Union
1980 Moscow	Aleksandr Portnov; Soviet Union	Carlos Girón; Mexico	Giorgio Cagnotto; Italy
1984 Los Angeles	Greg Louganis; United States	Tan Liangde; China	Ronald Merriott; United States
1988 Seoul	Greg Louganis; United States	Tan Liangde; China	Li Deliang; China
1992 Barcelona	Mark Lenzi; United States	Tan Liangde; China	Dmitri Sautin; Unified Team
1996 Atlanta	Xiong Ni; China	Yu Zhuocheng; China	Mark Lenzi; United States
2000 Sydney	Xiong Ni; China	Fernando Platas; Mexico	Dmitri Sautin; Russia
2004 Athens	Peng Bo; China	Alexandre Despatie; Canada	Dmitri Sautin; Russia
2008 Beijing	He Chong; China	Alexandre Despatie; Canada	Qin Kai; China
2012 London	Ilya Zakharov; Russia	Qin Kai; China	He Chong; China
2016 Rio de Janeiro	Cao Yuan; China	Jack Laugher; Great Britain	Patrick Hausding; Germany
2020 Tokyo	Xie Siyi; China	Wang Zongyuan; China	Jack Laugher; Great Britain
2024 Paris	Xie Siyi; China	Wang Zongyuan; China	Osmar Olvera; Mexico
2028 Los Angeles			

===== Medal table =====
Rank	Nation	Gold	Silver	Bronze	Total
1	United States	15	10	12	37
2	China	7	7	3	17
3	Germany	2	2	3	7
4	Soviet Union	2	0	1	3
5	Russia	1	0	2	3
6	Italy	0	3	1	4
7	Mexico	0	2	2	4
8	Canada	0	2	0	2
9	Great Britain	0	1	1	2
10	Egypt	0	0	1	1
10	Unified Team	0	0	1	1
Totals (11 entries)		27	27	27	81

==== Synchronized 10 metre platform ====
Games	Gold	Silver	Bronze
2000 Sydney	Igor Lukashin and Dmitri Sautin (RUS)	Hu Jia and Tian Liang (CHN)	Jan Hempel and Heiko Meyer (GER)
2004 Athens	Tian Liang and Yang Jinghui (CHN)	Leon Taylor and Peter Waterfield (GBR)	Mathew Helm and Robert Newbery (AUS)
2008 Beijing	Lin Yue and Huo Liang (CHN)	Patrick Hausding and Sascha Klein (GER)	Gleb Galperin and Dmitriy Dobroskok (RUS)
2012 London	Cao Yuan and Zhang Yanquan (CHN)	Iván García and Germán Sánchez (MEX)	David Boudia and Nicholas McCrory (USA)
2016 Rio de Janeiro	Chen Aisen and Lin Yue (CHN)	David Boudia and Steele Johnson (USA)	Tom Daley and Daniel Goodfellow (GBR)
2020 Tokyo	Tom Daley and Matty Lee (GBR)	Cao Yuan and Chen Aisen (CHN)	Aleksandr Bondar and Viktor Minibaev (ROC)
2024 Paris	Yang Hao and Lian Junjie (CHN)	Tom Daley and Noah Williams (GBR)	Nathan Zsombor-Murray and Rylan Wiens (CAN)
2028 Los Angeles			

===== Medal table =====
Rank	Nation	Gold	Silver	Bronze	Total
1	China	5	2	0	7
2	Great Britain	1	2	1	4
3	Russia	1	0	1	2
4	Germany	0	1	1	2
4	United States	0	1	1	2
6	Mexico	0	1	0	1
7	Australia	0	0	1	1
7	Canada	0	0	1	1
7	ROC (ROC)	0	0	1	1
Totals (9 entries)		7	7	7	21

==== Synchronized 3 metre springboard ====
Games	Gold	Silver	Bronze
2000 Sydney	Xiong Ni and Xiao Hailiang (CHN)	Aleksandr Dobroskok and Dmitri Sautin (RUS)	Robert Newbery and Dean Pullar (AUS)
2004 Athens	Thomas Bimis and Nikolaos Siranidis (GRE)	Andreas Wels and Tobias Schellenberg (GER)	Steven Barnett and Robert Newbery (AUS)
2008 Beijing	Wang Feng and Qin Kai (CHN)	Dmitri Sautin and Yuriy Kunakov (RUS)	Illya Kvasha and Oleksiy Prygorov (UKR)
2012 London	Luo Yutong and Qin Kai (CHN)	Ilya Zakharov and Evgeny Kuznetsov (RUS)	Troy Dumais and Kristian Ipsen (USA)
2016 Rio de Janeiro	Chris Mears and Jack Laugher (GBR)	Sam Dorman and Michael Hixon (USA)	Cao Yuan and Qin Kai (CHN)
2020 Tokyo	Xie Siyi and Wang Zongyuan (CHN)	Andrew Capobianco and Michael Hixon (USA)	Patrick Hausding and Lars Rüdiger (GER)
2024 Paris	Long Daoyi and Wang Zongyuan (CHN)	Juan Celaya and Osmar Olvera (MEX)	Anthony Harding and Jack Laugher (GBR)
2028 Los Angeles			

===== Medal table =====
Rank	Nation	Gold	Silver	Bronze	Total
1	China	5	0	1	6
2	Great Britain	1	0	1	2
3	Greece	1	0	0	1
4	Russia	0	3	0	3
5	United States	0	2	1	3
6	Germany	0	1	1	2
7	Mexico	0	1	0	1
8	Australia	0	0	2	2
9	Ukraine	0	0	1	1
Totals (9 entries)		7	7	7	21

=== Women ===
==== 10 metre platform ====
Games	Gold	Silver	Bronze
1912 Stockholm	Greta Johansson; Sweden	Lisa Regnell; Sweden	Isabelle White; Great Britain
1920 Antwerp	Stefanie Clausen; Denmark	Beatrice Armstrong; Great Britain	Eva Olliwier; Sweden
1924 Paris	Caroline Smith; United States	Elizabeth Becker-Pinkston; United States	Hjördis Töpel; Sweden
1928 Amsterdam	Elizabeth Becker-Pinkston; United States	Georgia Coleman; United States	Laura Sjöqvist; Sweden
1932 Los Angeles	Dorothy Poynton-Hill; United States	Georgia Coleman; United States	Marion Roper; United States
1936 Berlin	Dorothy Poynton-Hill; United States	Velma Dunn; United States	Käthe Köhler; Germany
1948 London	Vicki Draves; United States	Patsy Elsener; United States	Birte Christoffersen; Denmark
1952 Helsinki	Pat McCormick; United States	Paula Jean Myers; United States	Juno Stover-Irwin; United States
1956 Melbourne	Pat McCormick; United States	Juno Stover-Irwin; United States	Paula Jean Myers-Pope; United States
1960 Rome	Ingrid Krämer; United Team of Germany	Paula Jean Myers-Pope; United States	Ninel Krutova; Soviet Union
1964 Tokyo	Lesley Bush; United States	Ingrid Engel-Krämer; United Team of Germany	Galina Alekseyeva; Soviet Union
1968 Mexico City	Milena Duchková; Czechoslovakia	Natalya Lobanova; Soviet Union	Ann Peterson; United States
1972 Munich	Ulrika Knape; Sweden	Milena Duchková; Czechoslovakia	Marina Janicke; East Germany
1976 Montreal	Elena Vaytsekhovskaya; Soviet Union	Ulrika Knape; Sweden	Deborah Wilson; United States
1980 Moscow	Martina Jäschke; East Germany	Sirvard Emirzyan; Soviet Union	Liana Tsotadze; Soviet Union
1984 Los Angeles	Zhou Jihong; China	Michele Mitchell; United States	Wendy Wyland; United States
1988 Seoul	Xu Yanmei; China	Michele Mitchell; United States	Wendy Williams; United States
1992 Barcelona	Fu Mingxia; China	Yelena Miroshina; Unified Team	Mary Ellen Clark; United States
1996 Atlanta	Fu Mingxia; China	Annika Walter; Germany	Mary Ellen Clark; United States
2000 Sydney	Laura Wilkinson; United States	Li Na; China	Anne Montminy; Canada
2004 Athens	Chantelle Newbery; Australia	Lao Lishi; China	Loudy Tourky; Australia
2008 Beijing	Chen Ruolin; China	Émilie Heymans; Canada	Wang Xin; China
2012 London	Chen Ruolin; China	Brittany Broben; Australia	Pandelela Rinong Pamg; Malaysia
2016 Rio de Janeiro	Ren Qian; China	Si Yajie; China	Meaghan Benfeito; Canada
2020 Tokyo	Quan Hongchan; China	Chen Yuxi; China	Melissa Wu; Australia
2024 Paris	Quan Hongchan; China	Chen Yuxi; China	Kim Mi-rae; North Korea
2028 Los Angeles			

===== Medal table =====
Rank	Nation	Gold	Silver	Bronze	Total
1	United States	9	10	9	28
2	China	9	5	1	15
3	Sweden	2	2	3	7
4	Soviet Union	1	2	3	6
5	Australia	1	1	2	4
6	Czechoslovakia	1	1	0	2
6	United Team of Germany	1	1	0	2
8	Denmark	1	0	1	2
8	East Germany	1	0	1	2
10	Canada	0	1	2	3
11	Germany	0	1	1	2
11	Great Britain	0	1	1	2
13	Unified Team	0	1	0	1
14	Malaysia	0	0	1	1
14	North Korea	0	0	1	1
Totals (15 entries)		26	26	26	78

==== 3 metre springboard ====
Games	Gold	Silver	Bronze
1920 Antwerp	Aileen Riggin; United States	Helen Wainwright; United States	Thelma Payne; United States
1924 Paris	Elizabeth Becker-Pinkston; United States	Aileen Riggin; United States	Caroline Fletcher; United States
1928 Amsterdam	Helen Meany; United States	Dorothy Poynton-Hill; United States	Georgia Coleman; United States
1932 Los Angeles	Georgia Coleman; United States	Katherine Rawls; United States	Jane Fauntz; United States
1936 Berlin	Marjorie Gestring; United States	Katherine Rawls; United States	Dorothy Poynton-Hill; United States
1948 London	Vicki Draves; United States	Zoe Ann Olsen; United States	Patsy Elsener; United States
1952 Helsinki	Pat McCormick; United States	Madeleine Moreau; France	Zoe Ann Olsen-Jensen; United States
1956 Melbourne	Pat McCormick; United States	Jeanne Stunyo; United States	Irene MacDonald; Canada
1960 Rome	Ingrid Krämer; United Team of Germany	Paula Jean Myers-Pope; United States	Elizabeth Ferris; Great Britain
1964 Tokyo	Ingrid Engel-Krämer; United Team of Germany	Jeanne Collier; United States	Patsy Willard; United States
1968 Mexico City	Susanne Gossick; United States	Tamara Pogosheva; Soviet Union	Keala O'Sullivan; United States
1972 Munich	Micki King; United States	Ulrika Knape; Sweden	Marina Janicke; East Germany
1976 Montreal	Jennifer Chandler; United States	Christa Köhler; East Germany	Cynthia Potter; United States
1980 Moscow	Irina Kalinina; Soviet Union	Martina Proeber; East Germany	Karin Guthke; East Germany
1984 Los Angeles	Sylvie Bernier; Canada	Kelly McCormick; United States	Christina Seufert; United States
1988 Seoul	Gao Min; China	Li Qing; China	Kelly McCormick; United States
1992 Barcelona	Gao Min; China	Irina Lashko; Unified Team	Brita Baldus; Germany
1996 Atlanta	Fu Mingxia; China	Irina Lashko; Russia	Annie Pelletier; Canada
2000 Sydney	Fu Mingxia; China	Guo Jingjing; China	Dörte Lindner; Germany
2004 Athens	Guo Jingjing; China	Wu Minxia; China	Yuliya Pakhalina; Russia
2008 Beijing	Guo Jingjing; China	Yuliya Pakhalina; Russia	Wu Minxia; China
2012 London	Wu Minxia; China	He Zi; China	Laura Sánchez; Mexico
2016 Rio de Janeiro	Shi Tingmao; China	He Zi; China	Tania Cagnotto; Italy
2020 Tokyo	Shi Tingmao; China	Wang Han; China	Krysta Palmer; United States
2024 Paris	Chen Yiwen; China	Maddison Keeney; Australia	Chang Yani; China
2028 Los Angeles			

===== Medal table =====
Rank	Nation	Gold	Silver	Bronze	Total
1	United States	11	10	13	34
2	China	10	6	2	18
3	United Team of Germany	2	0	0	2
4	Soviet Union	1	1	0	2
5	Canada	1	0	2	3
6	East Germany	0	2	2	4
7	Russia	0	2	1	3
8	Australia	0	1	0	1
8	France	0	1	0	1
8	Sweden	0	1	0	1
8	Unified Team	0	1	0	1
12	Germany	0	0	2	2
13	Great Britain	0	0	1	1
13	Italy	0	0	1	1
13	Mexico	0	0	1	1
Totals (15 entries)		25	25	25	75

==== Synchronized 10 metre platform ====
Games	Gold	Silver	Bronze
2000 Sydney	Li Na and Sang Xue (CHN)	Émilie Heymans and Anne Montminy (CAN)	Rebecca Gilmore and Loudy Tourky (AUS)
2004 Athens	Lao Lishi and Li Ting (CHN)	Natalia Goncharova and Yulia Koltunova (RUS)	Blythe Hartley and Émilie Heymans (CAN)
2008 Beijing	Chen Ruolin and Wang Xin (CHN)	Briony Cole and Melissa Wu (AUS)	Paola Espinosa and Tatiana Ortiz (MEX)
2012 London	Chen Ruolin and Wang Hao (CHN)	Paola Espinosa and Alejandra Orozco (MEX)	Meaghan Benfeito and Roseline Filion (CAN)
2016 Rio de Janeiro	Chen Ruolin and Liu Huixia (CHN)	Cheong Jun Hoong and Pandelela Rinong (MAS)	Meaghan Benfeito and Roseline Filion (CAN)
2020 Tokyo	Chen Yuxi and Zhang Jiaqi (CHN)	Delaney Schnell and Jessica Parratto (USA)	Gabriela Agundez and Alejandra Orozco (MEX)
2024 Paris	Chen Yuxi and Quan Hongchan (CHN)	Kim Mi-rae and Jo Jin-mi (PRK)	Andrea Spendolini-Sirieix and Lois Toulson (GBR)
2028 Los Angeles			

===== Medal table =====
Rank	Nation	Gold	Silver	Bronze	Total
1	China	7	0	0	7
2	Canada	0	1	3	4
3	Mexico	0	1	2	3
4	Australia	0	1	1	2
5	Malaysia	0	1	0	1
5	North Korea	0	1	0	1
5	Russia	0	1	0	1
5	United States	0	1	0	1
9	Great Britain	0	0	1	1
Totals (9 entries)		7	7	7	21

==== Synchronized 3 metre springboard ====
Games	Gold	Silver	Bronze
2000 Sydney	Vera Ilyina and Yuliya Pakhalina (RUS)	Fu Mingxia and Guo Jingjing (CHN)	Ganna Sorokina and Olena Zhupina (UKR)
2004 Athens	Guo Jingjing and Wu Minxia (CHN)	Vera Ilyina and Yuliya Pakhalina (RUS)	Irina Lashko and Chantelle Newbery (AUS)
2008 Beijing	Guo Jingjing and Wu Minxia (CHN)	Anastasia Pozdniakova and Yuliya Pakhalina (RUS)	Ditte Kotzian and Heike Fischer (GER)
2012 London	He Zi and Wu Minxia (CHN)	Kelci Bryant and Abigail Johnston (USA)	Jennifer Abel and Émilie Heymans (CAN)
2016 Rio de Janeiro	Shi Tingmao and Wu Minxia (CHN)	Tania Cagnotto and Francesca Dallapé (ITA)	Maddison Keeney and Anabelle Smith (AUS)
2020 Tokyo	Shi Tingmao and Wang Han (CHN)	Mélissa Citrini-Beaulieu and Jennifer Abel (CAN)	Lena Hentschel and Tina Punzel (GER)
2024 Paris	Chen Yiwen and Chang Yani (CHN)	Sarah Bacon and Kassidy Cook (USA)	Yasmin Harper and Scarlett Mew Jensen (GBR)
2028 Los Angeles			

===== Medal table =====
Rank	Nation	Gold	Silver	Bronze	Total
1	China	6	1	0	7
2	Russia	1	2	0	3
3	United States	0	2	0	2
4	Canada	0	1	1	2
5	Italy	0	1	0	1
6	Australia	0	0	2	2
6	Germany	0	0	2	2
8	Great Britain	0	0	1	1
8	Ukraine	0	0	1	1
Totals (9 entries)		7	7	7	21

== Discontinued events ==
=== Men ===
==== Plain high diving ====
Games	Gold	Silver	Bronze
1912 Stockholm	Erik Adlerz; Sweden	Hjalmar Johansson; Sweden	John Jansson; Sweden
1920 Antwerp	Arvid Wallman; Sweden	Nils Skoglund; Sweden	John Jansson; Sweden
1924 Paris	Dick Eve; Australia	John Jansson; Sweden	Harold Clarke; Great Britain

===== Medal table =====
Rank	Nation	Gold	Silver	Bronze	Total
1	Sweden	2	3	2	7
2	Australia	1	0	0	1
3	Great Britain	0	0	1	1
Totals (3 entries)		3	3	3	9

==== Plunge for distance ====
Games	Gold	Silver	Bronze
1904 St. Louis	William Dickey; United States	Edgar Adams; United States	Leo Goodwin; United States

===== Medal table =====
Rank	Nation	Gold	Silver	Bronze	Total
1	United States	1	1	1	3
Totals (1 entries)		1	1	1	3

== All-time medal table 1904–2024 ==
Rank	Nation	Gold	Silver	Bronze	Total
1	China	55	26	11	92
2	United States	49	47	46	142
3	Sweden	6	8	7	21
4	Russia	4	8	6	18
5	Soviet Union	4	4	6	14
6	Italy	3	5	3	11
7	Australia	3	4	8	15
8	United Team of Germany	3	1	0	4
9	Germany	2	8	12	22
10	Great Britain	2	4	11	17
11	East Germany	2	2	3	7
12	Mexico	1	8	8	17
13	Canada	1	5	9	15
14	Czechoslovakia	1	1	0	2
15	Denmark	1	0	1	2
16	Greece	1	0	0	1
17	Unified Team	0	2	1	3
18	Egypt	0	1	1	2
18	Malaysia	0	1	1	2
18	North Korea	0	1	1	2
21	France	0	1	0	1
21	Japan	0	1	0	1
23	Ukraine	0	0	2	2
24	ROC	0	0	1	1
Totals (24 entries)		138	138	138	414

== See also ==
- Diving at the 1906 Intercalated Games — these Intercalated Games are no longer regarded as official Games by the International Olympic Committee
