= Diving at the 1956 Summer Olympics =

Diving at the Games of the XVI Olympiad
- Venue: Melbourne Sports and Entertainment Centre
- Dates: 30 November 1956 through 7 December 1956
- No. of events: 4
- Competitors: 60 from 16 nations

At the 1956 Summer Olympics in Melbourne, four diving events were contested.

== Medal summary ==
The events are labelled as 3 metre springboard and 10 metre platform by the International Olympic Committee, and appeared on the 1956 Official Report as springboard diving and high diving, respectively.

=== Men ===
Event	Gold	Silver	Bronze
3 metre springboard	Bob Clotworthy; United States	Donald Harper; United States	Joaquín Capilla; Mexico
10 metre platform	Joaquín Capilla; Mexico	Gary Tobian; United States	Richard Connor; United States

=== Women ===
Event	Gold	Silver	Bronze
3 metre springboard	Pat McCormick; United States	Jeanne Stunyo; United States	Irene MacDonald; Canada
10 metre platform	Pat McCormick; United States	Juno Stover-Irwin; United States	Paula Jean Myers-Pope; United States

== Medal table ==
Rank	Nation	Gold	Silver	Bronze	Total
1	United States	3	4	2	9
2	Mexico	1	0	1	2
3	Canada	0	0	1	1
Totals (3 entries)		4	4	4	12

=== Participating nations ===
- Australia (10)
- Austria (1)
- Brazil (2)
- Canada (2)
- Chile (1)
- Denmark (2)
- Finland (1)
- France (2)
- Great Britain (5)
- Hungary (2)
- Israel (1)
- Japan (4)
- Mexico (3)
- Soviet Union (11)
- Sweden (1)
- United States (9)

== See also ==
- Diving at the 1955 Pan American Games
