= Diving at the 1960 Summer Olympics =

Diving at the Games of the XVII Olympiad
- Venue: Stadio Olimpico del Nuoto
- Dates: 26 August 1960 through 2 September 1960
- No. of events: 4
- Competitors: 75 from 25 nations

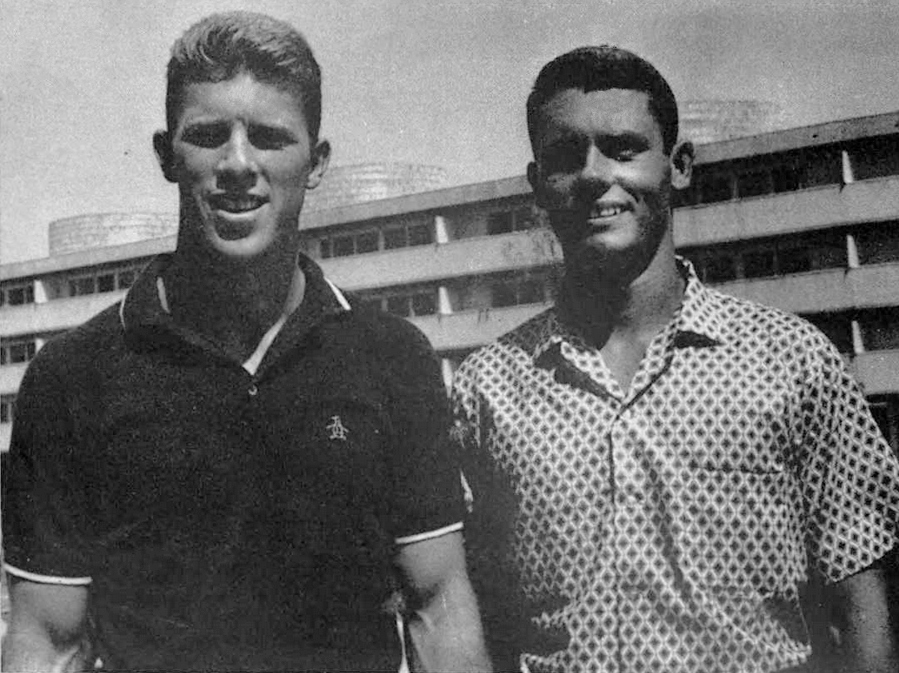
Gary Tobian (left) and Bob Webster in 1960

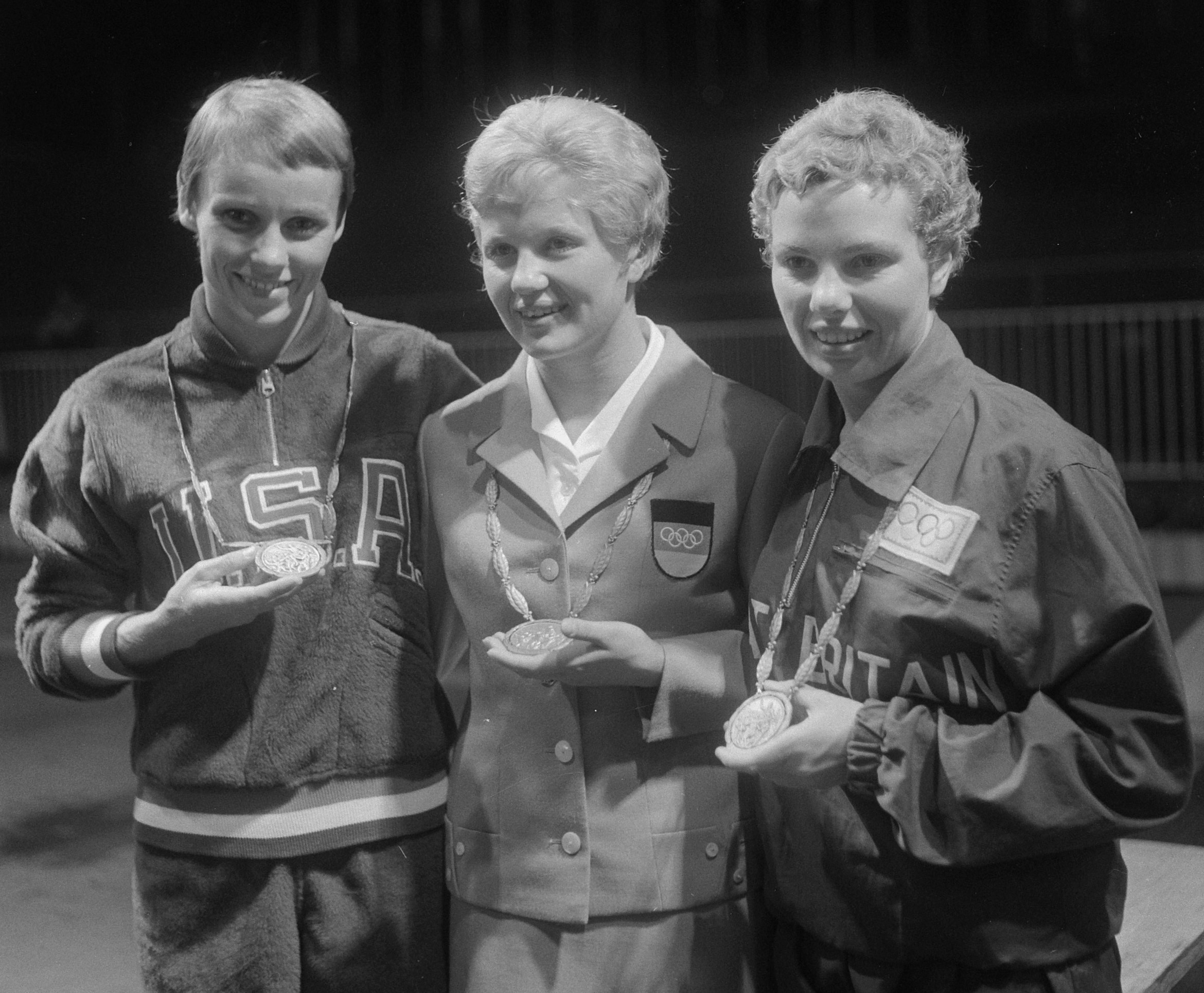
Left-right: Paula Jean Myers-Pope, Ingrid Krämer and Elizabeth Ferris at the 1960 Olympics

At the 1960 Summer Olympics in Rome, four diving events were contested.

== Medal summary ==
The events are labelled as 3 metre springboard and 10 metre platform by the International Olympic Committee, and appeared on the 1960 Official Report as 3-metre springboard diving and 10-metre high diving, respectively.

=== Men ===
Event	Gold	Silver	Bronze
3 m springboard	Gary Tobian; United States	Samuel Hall; United States	Juan Botella; Mexico
10 m platform	Bob Webster; United States	Gary Tobian; United States	Brian Phelps; Great Britain

=== Women ===
Event	Gold	Silver	Bronze
3 m springboard	Ingrid Krämer; United Team of Germany	Paula Jean Myers-Pope; United States	Elizabeth Ferris; Great Britain
10 m platform	Ingrid Krämer; United Team of Germany	Paula Jean Myers-Pope; United States	Ninel Krutova; Soviet Union

== Medal table ==
Rank	Nation	Gold	Silver	Bronze	Total
1	United States	2	4	0	6
2	United Team of Germany	2	0	0	2
3	Great Britain	0	0	2	2
4	Mexico	0	0	1	1
4	Soviet Union	0	0	1	1
Totals (5 entries)		4	4	4	12

=== Participating nations ===
- Argentina (1)
- Australia (4)
- Austria (2)
- Brazil (1)
- Canada (2)
- Colombia (1)
- Czechoslovakia (1)
- Denmark (2)
- Egypt (3)
- Finland (1)
- France (4)
- United Team of Germany (7)
- Great Britain (7)
- Hungary (2)
- Italy (5)
- Japan (5)
- South Korea (1)
- Mexico (4)
- Netherlands (2)
- Poland (1)
- Rhodesia (1)
- Soviet Union (7)
- Sweden (4)
- Switzerland (1)
- United States (5)

== See also ==
- Diving at the 1959 Pan American Games
