= Paula Jean Myers-Pope =

American diver (1934–1995)

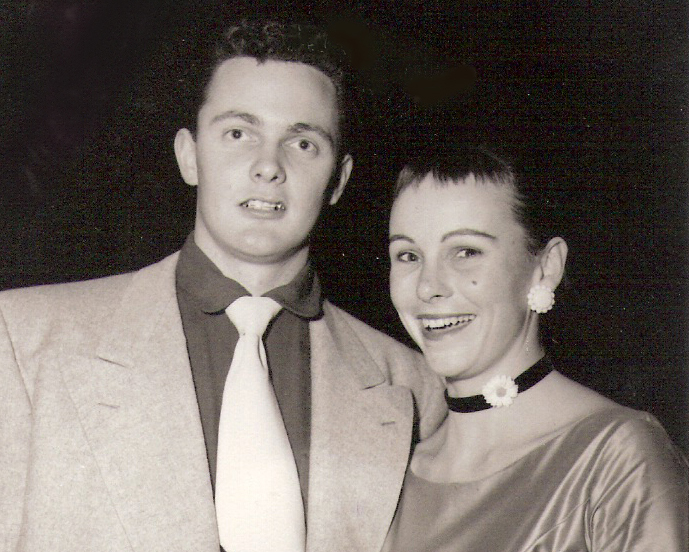
- Myers-Pope with husband Karl Pope

Personal information
- Born: Paula Jean Myers; November 11, 1934 La Verne, California, U.S.
- Died: June 9, 1995 (aged 60) Ojai, California, U.S.
- Education: Covina High School

Sport
- Sport: Diving
- Event(s): Platform, 3m springboard
- University team: Ohio State University Buckeyes and University of Southern California Trojans
- Club: Kappa Alpha Theta and Sammy Lee Swim Club
- Coached by: Rusty Smith (1948-1951); Lyle Draves (1952-1957); Sammy Lee (1958-1960, 1964)
Medal record
Women's diving
Representing the United States
Olympic Games
Silver medal – second place	1952 Helsinki	Platform
Silver medal – second place	1960 Rome	3m springboard
Silver medal – second place	1960 Rome	Platform
Bronze medal – third place	1956 Melbourne	Platform
Pan American Games
Gold medal – first place	1959 Chicago	3m springboard
Gold medal – first place	1959 Chicago	Platform

Paula Jean Myers-Pope (November 11, 1934 – June 9, 1995) was an American diver and four-time Olympic medalist in three Summer Olympic Games (1952, 1956 and 1960).

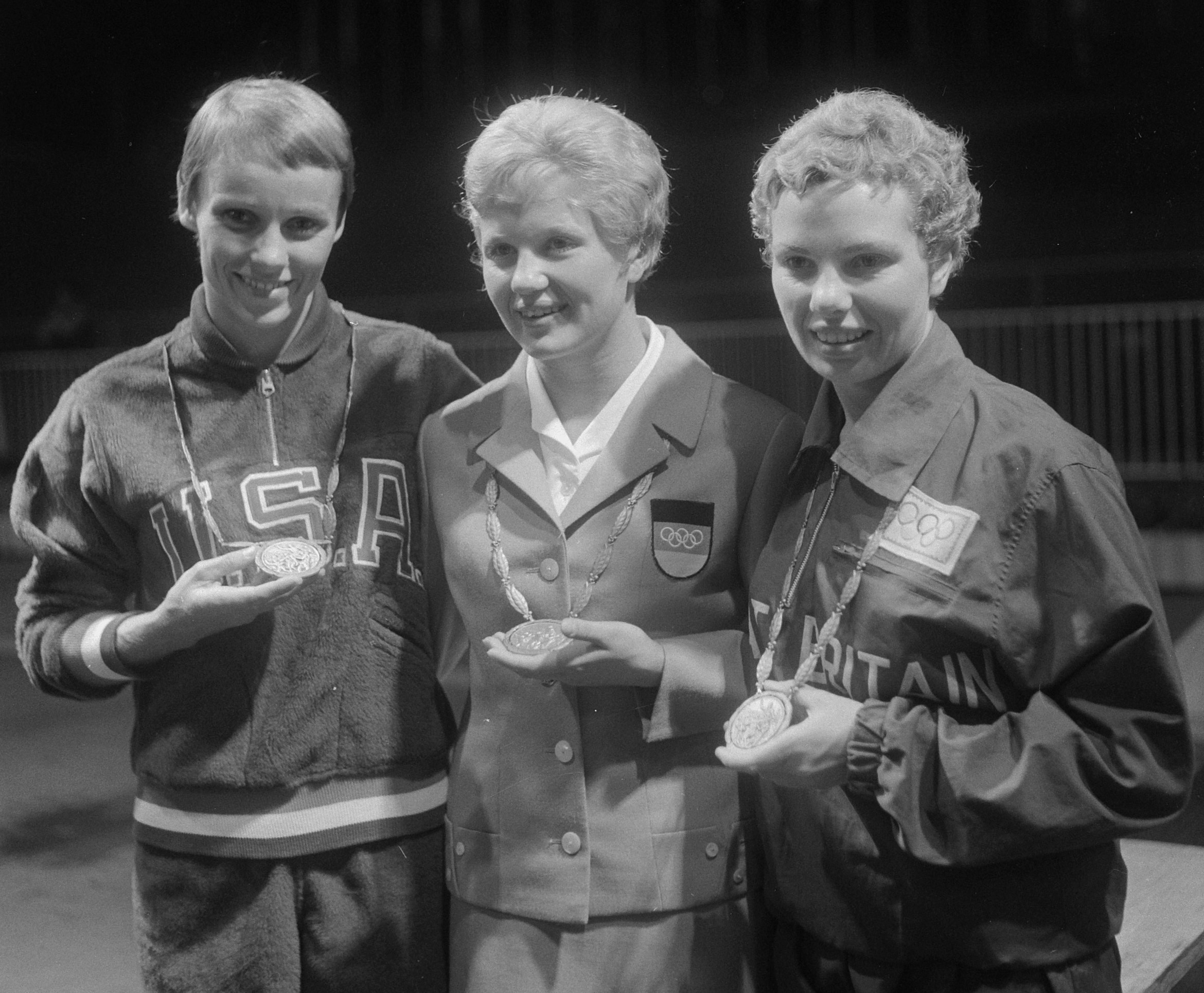
Paula Pope, Ingrid Kramer and Elizabeth Ferris at the 1960 Olympics

== Education ==
Myers was born and raised in La Verne, California, and attended high school in nearby Covina, where she was Freshman Class Treasurer, member of the Senior Class Council, the Girls’ Athletic Association and the California Scholastic Federation.

== Olympics ==
Myers-Pope was a member of the USA Olympic Diving Team three times, in 1952, 1956 and 1960. She won four medals in her three trips to the Olympics.

=== 1952 Olympics ===
At 17 years of age, Myers won a silver medal in the 10-meter tower event at the 1952 Summer Olympics in Helsinki, Finland. Teammate, Pat McCormick won the gold and teammate, Juno Stover-Irwin won the bronze.

=== 1956 Olympics ===
Myers won a bronze medal in the same event, 10-metre platform, at the 1956 Summer Olympics, in Melbourne, Australia. Teammate, Pat McCormick won the gold, again, but this time she flip-flopped with teammate, Juno Stover-Irwin, who won the silver medal this time.

=== 1960 Olympics ===
Myers-Pope won two silver medals at the 1960 Summer Olympics in Rome, Italy, one in the 3-meter springboard event and one in the 10-meter tower. In both events, Miss Ingrid Krämer from East Germany won the gold medals this year.

=== 1964 Olympic trials ===
Myers-Pope temporarily retired from competitive diving and not been in a pool from the 1960 Olympic Games until April, 1964. At the U.S. Olympic trials, at Astoria Pool, in Queens, New York, in September, 1964, she finished eighth and retired again from competitive diving.

== Pan American Games ==
Myers-Pope won two gold medals at the 1959 Pan American Games, in both the 10-meter tower and 3-meter springboard for Team USA.

== College years ==
Myers first attended Ohio State University in the mid-1950s, graduated with a degree in dental hygiene from the University of Southern California and became a dental hygienist. When Miss Myers entered USC on a leadership scholarship as there were no collegiate women's athletic programs at the time. She was inducted into the Kappa Alpha Theta sorority in 1954. She won 11 AAU Championships.

== Racquet club ==
In 1984, Myers-Pope retired from her career in dental hygiene, then co-owned and operated the Ojai Valley Racquet Club with her husband in Ojai, California. In 2008, they applied for a major renovation, including a luxury inn, for their Ojai Valley Racquet Club.

== Personal life ==
Between the 1952 and 1956 Olympics, Myers joined the Church of Jesus Christ of Latter-day Saints. She married Karl Pope (a USC basketball player) in 1958. The couple had two sons and three daughters. She died at the age of 60 in 1995.

== Legacy ==
Myers-Pope was the first woman to use a double twisting 1 1/2 somersault and inward 2 1/2 somersault in competition off the 10 meter. She was the Los Angeles Times Woman of the Year in 1960, and she has been inducted into the following Halls of Fame:

- Class of 1952, Covina High School Hall of Fame
- In 1979, the International Swimming Hall of Fame (ISHOF).
- In 1988, the Ventura County Sports Hall of Fame gave her a "Special Recognition Award".
- In 2007, the University of Southern California Athletic Hall of Fame

== See also ==
- List of members of the International Swimming Hall of Fame
- List of Latter Day Saints
- Covina High School Hall of Fame
