= Diving at the 1952 Summer Olympics =

Diving at the Games of the XV Olympiad
- Venue: Helsinki Swimming Stadium
- Dates: 27 July 1952 through 2 August 1952
- No. of events: 4
- Competitors: 76 from 22 nations

At the 1952 Summer Olympics in Helsinki, four diving events were contested.

== Medal summary ==
The events are labelled as 3 metre springboard and 10 metre platform by the International Olympic Committee, and appeared on the 1952 Official Report as springboard diving and high diving, respectively.

=== Men ===
Event	Gold	Silver	Bronze
3 metre springboard	David Browning; United States	Miller Anderson; United States	Bob Clotworthy; United States
10 metre platform	Samuel Lee; United States	Joaquín Capilla; Mexico	Günther Haase; Germany

=== Women ===
Event	Gold	Silver	Bronze
3 metre springboard	Pat McCormick; United States	Madeleine Moreau; France	Zoe-Ann Olsen-Jensen; United States
10 metre platform	Pat McCormick; United States	Paula Jean Myers; United States	Juno Stover-Irwin; United States

== Medal table ==
Rank	Nation	Gold	Silver	Bronze	Total
1	United States	4	2	3	9
2	France	0	1	0	1
2	Mexico	0	1	0	1
4	Germany	0	0	1	1
Totals (4 entries)		4	4	4	12

== Participating nations ==
- Australia (2)
- Austria (4)
- Bermuda (1)
- Brazil (2)
- Ceylon (1)
- Denmark (2)
- Egypt (4)
- Finland (3)
- France (4)
- Germany (4)
- Great Britain (9)
- Israel (1)
- Italy (1)
- Japan (2)
- Mexico (5)
- Netherlands (2)
- South Africa (1)
- Soviet Union (11)
- Sweden (4)
- Switzerland (2)
- United States (11)
- Venezuela (1)

== See also ==
- Diving at the 1951 Pan American Games
