= Diving at the 1959 Pan American Games =

Diving at the I959 Pan American Games

This page shows the results of the Diving Competition for men and women at the 1959 Pan American Games, held from August 27 to September 7, 1959 in Chicago, United States. There were two events, for both men and women.

== Medal table ==
Place	Nation	Gold medal	Silver medal	Bronze medal	Total
1	United States	3	4	3	10
2	Mexico	1	0	1	2
Total		4	4	4	12

== Medalists ==
=== Men ===
Event	Gold	Silver	Bronze
3m springboard	Gary Tobian; United States	Sam Hall; United States	Robert Webster; United States
10m platform	Alvaro Gaxiola; Mexico	Donald Harper; United States	Juan Botella; Mexico

=== Women ===
Event	Gold	Silver	Bronze
3m springboard	Paula Jean Pope; United States	Jean Lenzi; United States	Barbara Sue Gilders; United States
10m platform	Paula Jean Pope; United States	Juno Stover-Irwin; United States	Tahiea Sparling; United States

== See also ==
- Diving at the 1956 Summer Olympics
- Diving at the 1960 Summer Olympics
