= Jeanne Stunyo =

American diver

Personal information
- Full name: Jeanne Georgette Stunyo
- Born: April 11, 1936 Gary, Indiana, U.S.
- Died: May 18, 2025 (aged 89) Colorado Springs, Colorado, U.S.
Medal record
Women's diving
Representing the United States
Olympic Games
Silver medal – second place	1956 Melbourne	3m Springboard
Pan American Games
Silver medal – second place	1955 Mexico City	Springboard

Jeanne Georgette Stunyo (April 11, 1936 – May 18, 2025) was an American diver who earned a silver medal on the three-meter springboard event at the 1956 Summer Olympics in Melbourne, Australia.

At those same Games, Irene MacDonald finished in third place to become Canada's first Olympic medalist in diving. Standing at the top of the awards podium was gold medalist Patricia McCormick of the United States.

Prior to her performance at the 1956 Olympics, Jeanne Stunyo was a three-meter springboard finalist at the 1952 US Olympic Trials; Jeanne also won a silver medal at the 1955 Pan-American Games in Mexico City.

Coached by four-time Olympian, Clarence Pinkston, Jeanne Stunyo and teammate Barbara Sue Gilders competed for the Detroit Athletic Club; Jeanne also attended the University of Detroit.

Stunyo died in Colorado Springs, Colorado on May 18, 2025, at the age of 89.
