= List of Olympic venues in diving =

For the Summer Olympics, there are 25 venues that have been or will be used for diving.

Games	Venue	Other sports hosted at venue for those games	Capacity	Ref.
1904 St. Louis	Forest Park	Swimming, Water Polo	Not listed.	
1908 London	White City Stadium	Archery, Athletics, Cycling (track), Field hockey, Football, Gymnastics, Lacrosse, Rugby union, Swimming, Tug of war, Water polo (final), Wrestling	97,000	
1912 Stockholm	Djurgårdsbrunnsviken	Modern pentathlon (swimming), Rowing, Swimming, Water polo	Not listed.	
1920 Antwerp	Stade Nautique d'Antwerp	Swimming, Water polo	Not listed.	
1924 Paris	Piscine des Tourelles	Modern pentathlon (swimming), Swimming, Water polo	8,023	
1928 Amsterdam	Olympic Sports Park Swim Stadium	Modern pentathlon (swimming), Swimming, Water polo	4,440	
1932 Los Angeles	Swimming Stadium	Modern pentathlon (swimming), Swimming, Water polo	10,000	
1936 Berlin	Olympic Swimming Stadium	Modern pentathlon (swimming), Swimming, Water polo	20,000	
1948 London	Empire Pool	Boxing, Swimming, Water polo (final)	12,500	
1952 Helsinki	Swimming Stadium	Swimming, Water polo	12,500	
1956 Melbourne	Swimming/Diving Stadium	Modern pentathlon (swimming), Swimming, Water polo	6,000	
1960 Rome	Stadio Olimpico del Nuoto	Modern pentathlon (swimming), Swimming, Water polo (final)	20,000	
1964 Tokyo	National Gymnasium	Basketball, Modern pentathlon (swimming), Swimming	4,000 (basketball); 11,300 (diving, swimming)	
1968 Mexico City	Francisco Márquez Olympic Pool	Modern pentathlon (swimming), Swimming, Water polo (final)	15,000	
1972 Munich	Schwimmhalle	Modern pentathlon (swimming), Swimming, Water polo (final)	9,182	
1976 Montreal	Olympic Pool	Modern pentathlon (swimming), Swimming, Water polo (final)	10,000	
1980 Moscow	Swimming Pool - Olimpisky	Modern pentathlon (swimming), Swimming, Water polo (final)	13,000	
1984 Los Angeles	Olympic Swim Stadium	Swimming, Synchronized swimming	16,500	
1988 Seoul	Jamsil Indoor Swimming Pool	Modern pentathlon (swimming), Swimming, Synchronized swimming, Water polo	8,000	
1992 Barcelona	Piscina Municipal de Montjuïc	Water polo	6,500	
1996 Atlanta	Georgia Tech Aquatic Center	Modern pentathlon (swimming), Swimming, Synchronized swimming, Water polo	15,000	
2000 Sydney	Sydney International Aquatic Centre	Modern pentathlon (swimming), Swimming, Synchronized swimming, Water polo (men's final)	10,000	
2004 Athens	Athens Olympic Aquatic Centre	Swimming, Synchronized swimming, Water polo	23,000 (total of three pools)	
2008 Beijing	Beijing National Aquatic Center	Swimming, Synchronized swimming	17,000	
2012 London	Aquatics Centre	Modern pentathlon (swimming), Swimming, Synchronized swimming	17,500	
2016 Rio de Janeiro	Maria Lenk Aquatic Center	Synchronized swimming, Water polo	4,500	
2020 Tokyo	Tokyo Aquatics Centre	Swimming, Synchronized swimming	15,000	
2024 Paris	Paris Aquatic Centre	Synchronized swimming, Water polo	5,000	
2028 Los Angeles	Rose Bowl Aquatics Center	None	tbc	
2032 Brisbane	Brisbane Aquatics Centre	Synchronized swimming, Water polo	4,300	

== Gallery of venues ==
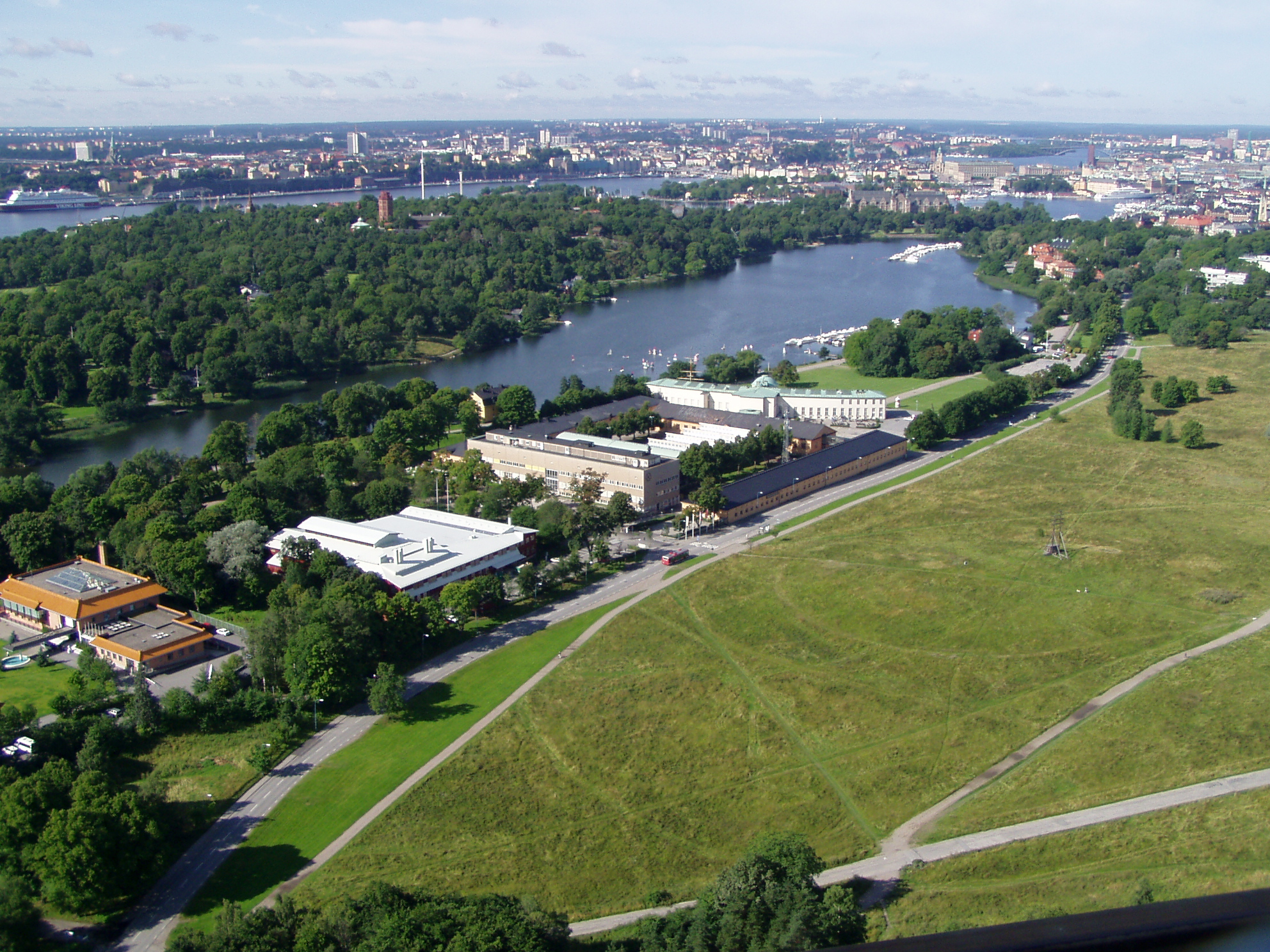
Djurgårdsbrunnsviken hosted diving at the 1912 Summer Olympics in Stockholm.

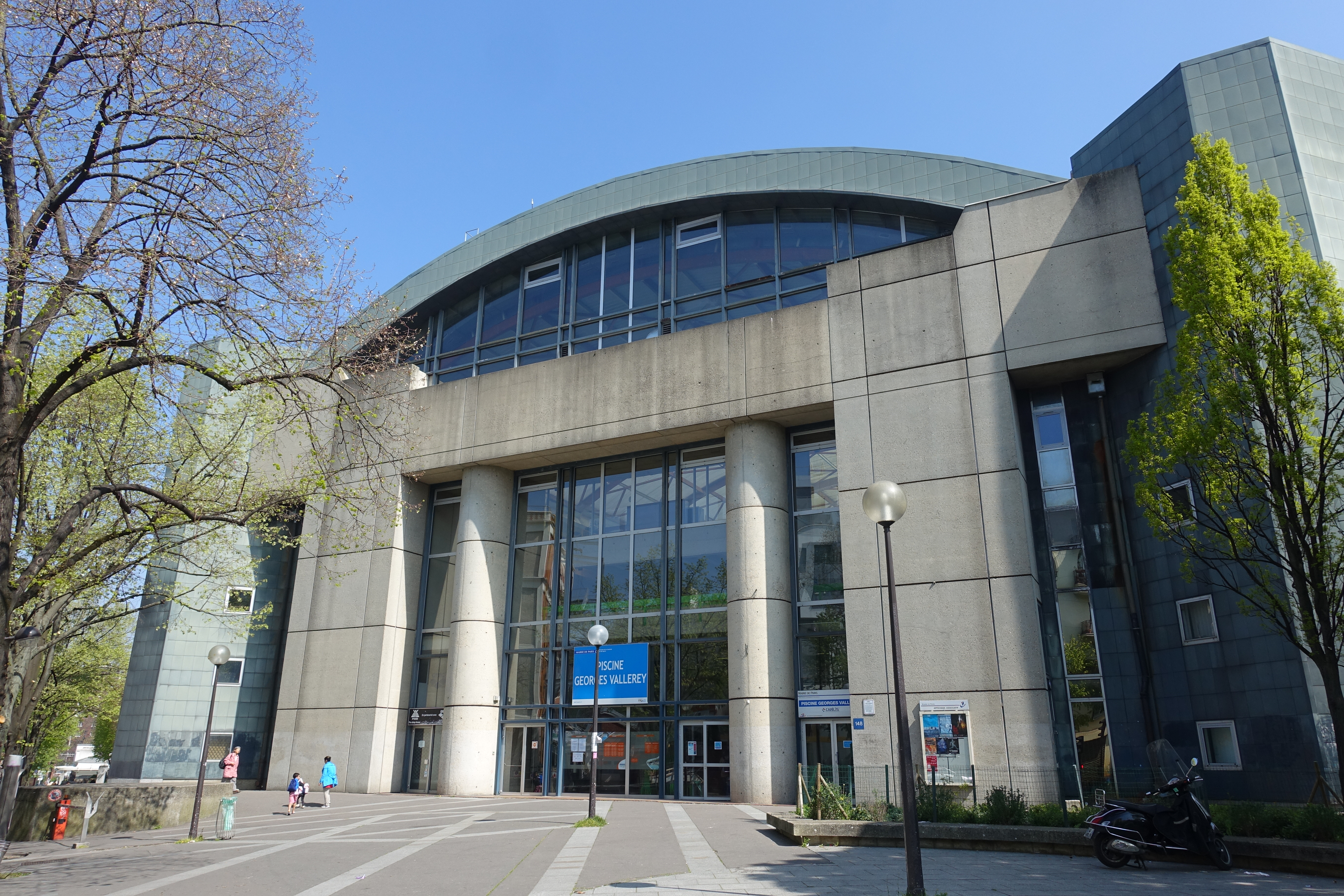
The Piscine des Tourelles hosted diving at the 1924 Summer Olympics in Paris.

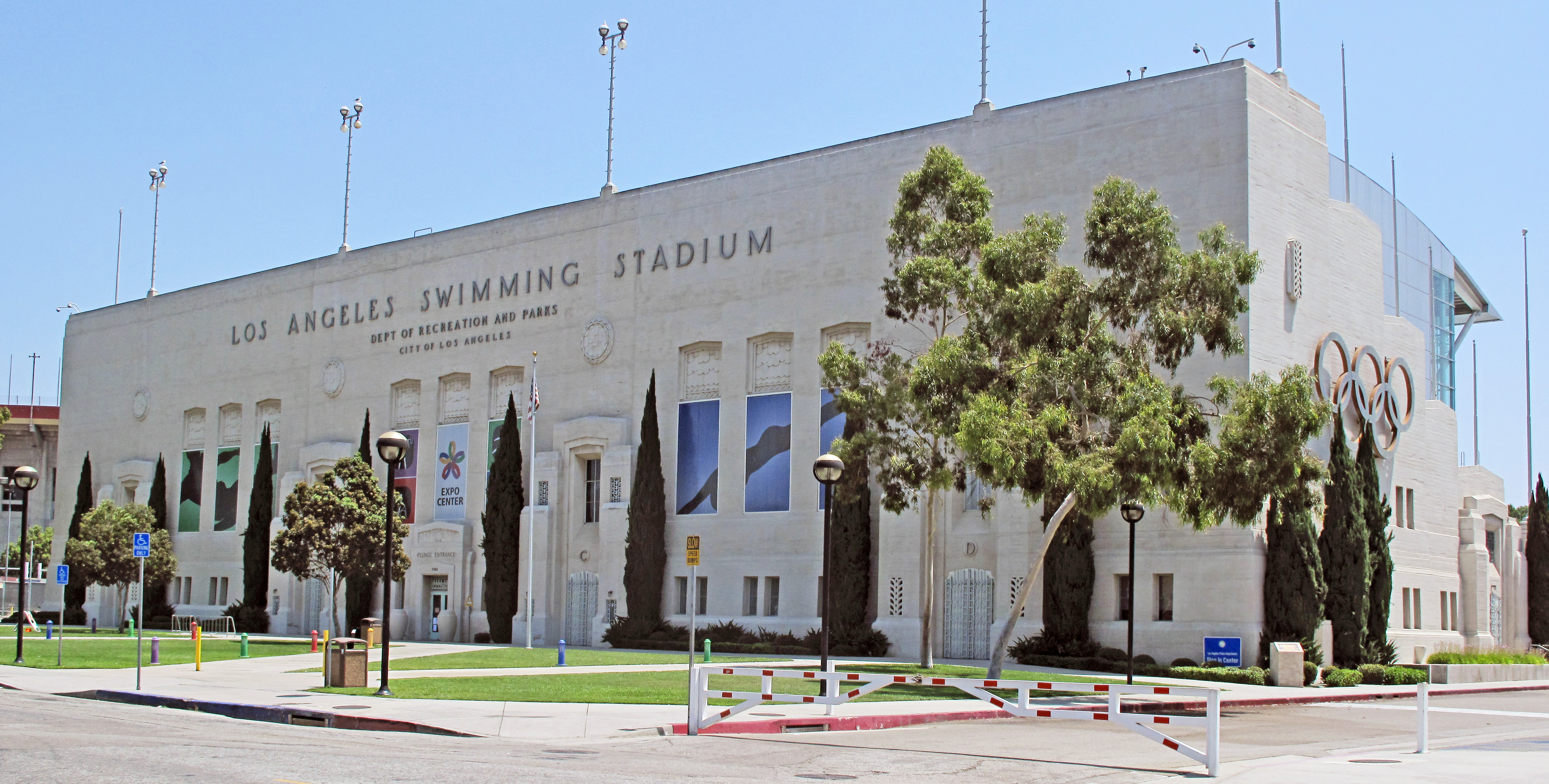
The LA84 Foundation/John C. Argue Swim Stadium hosted diving at the 1932 Summer Olympics in Los Angeles.

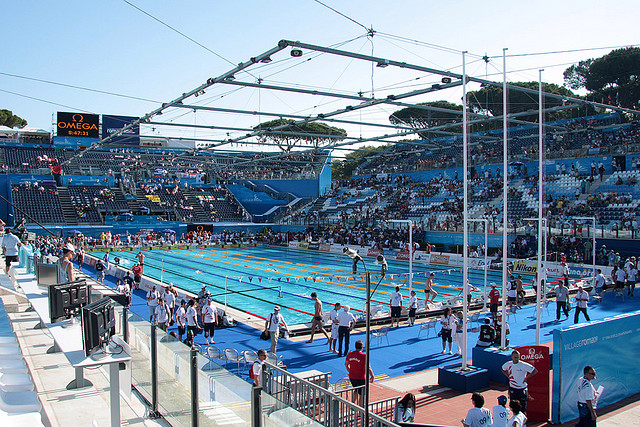
The Stadio Olimpico del Nuoto hosted diving at the 1960 Summer Olympics in Rome.

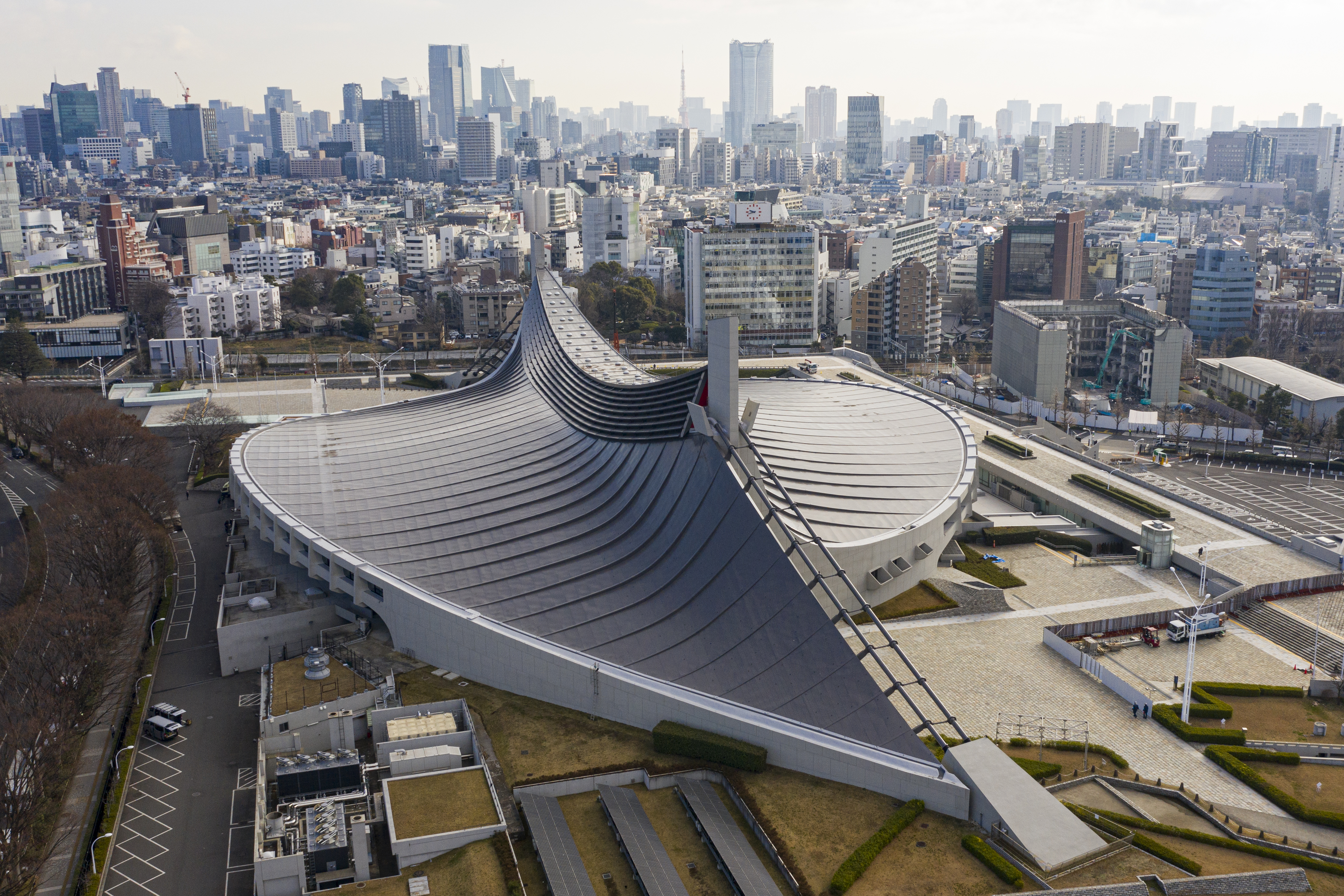
National Gymnasium hosted diving at the 1964 Summer Olympic in Tokyo.

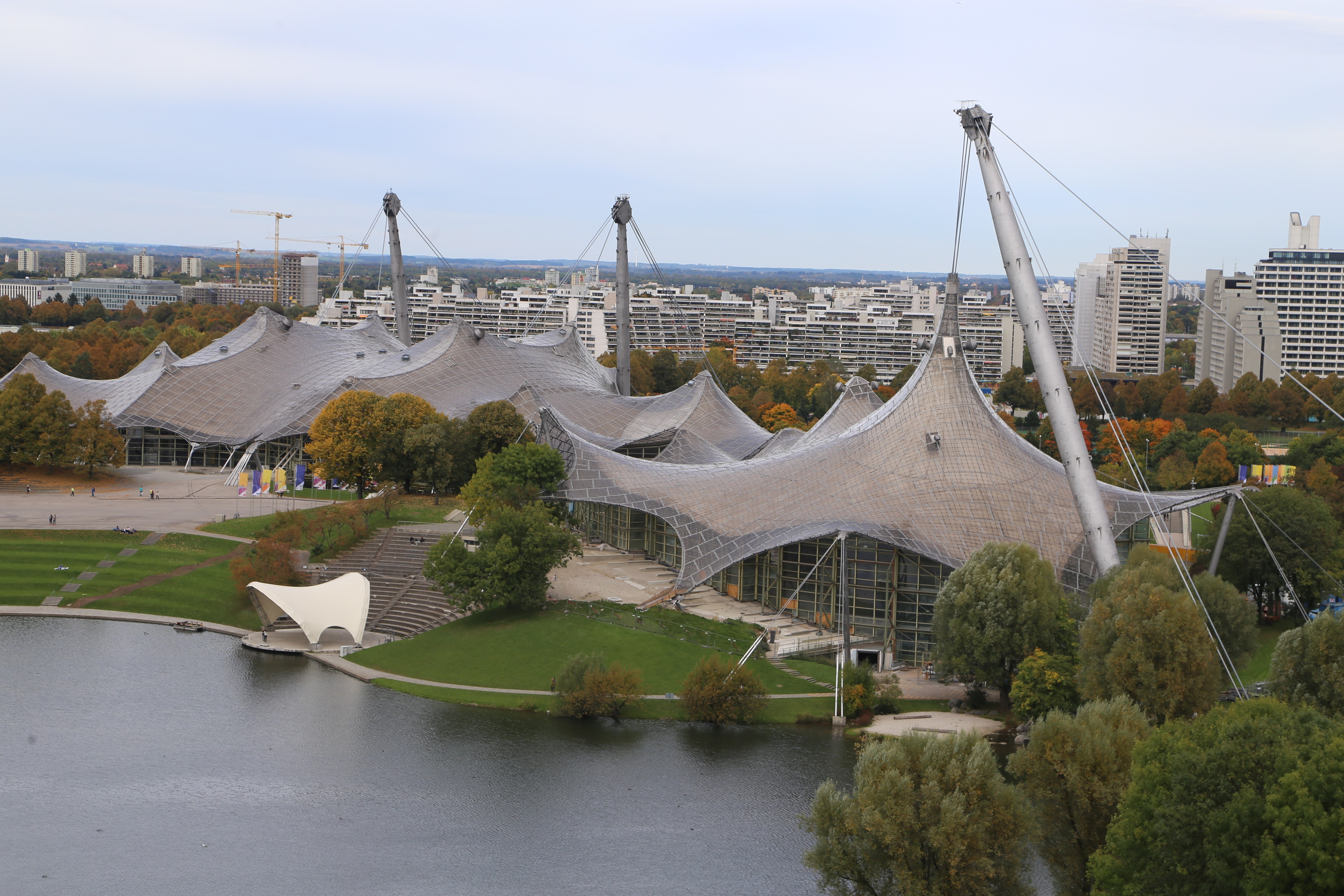
The Olympia Schwimmhalle hosted diving at the 1972 Summer Olympics in Munich.

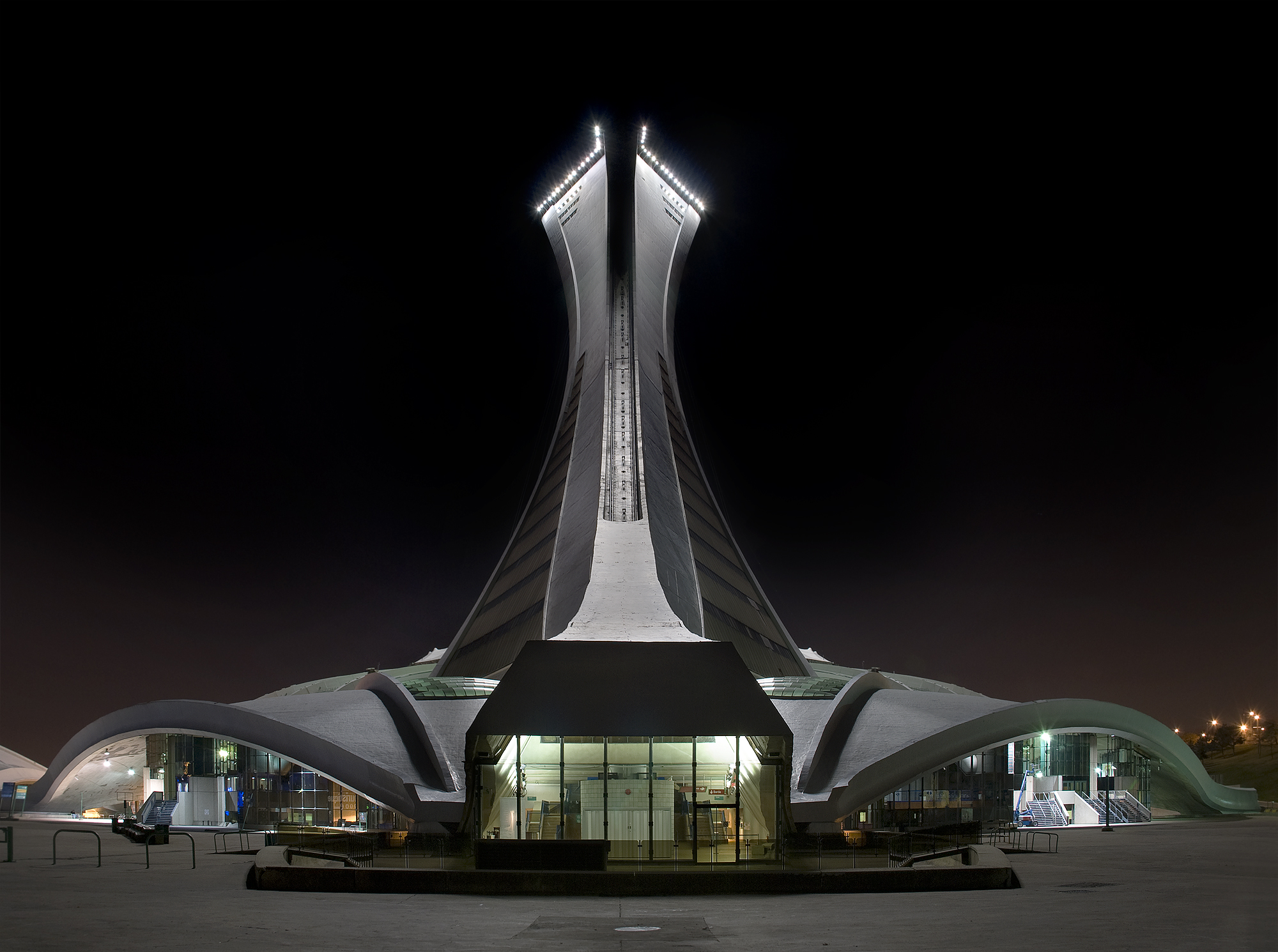
The Montreal Olympic Pool hosted diving at the 1976 Summer Olympics.

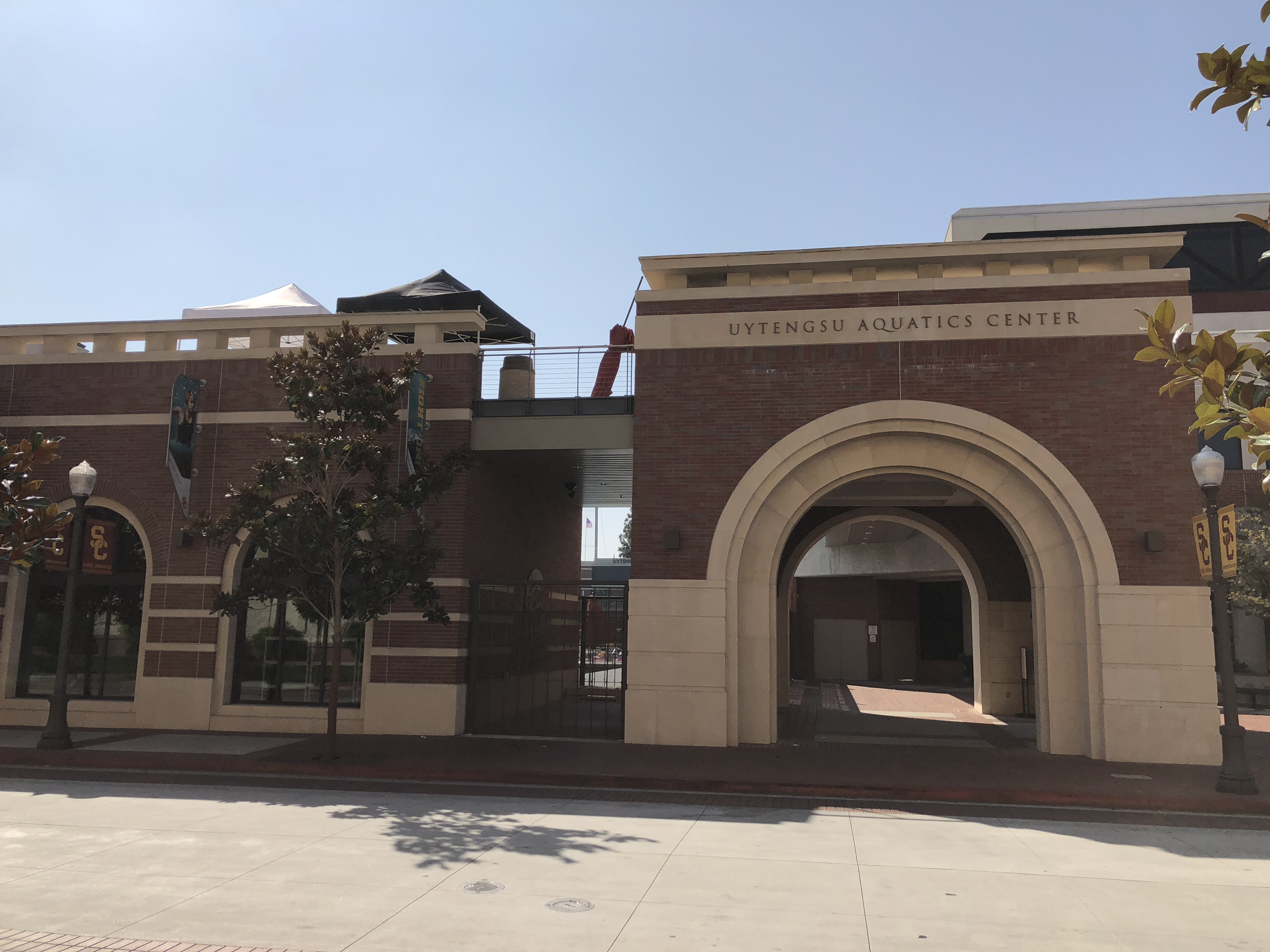
The Uytengsu Aquatics Center hosted diving at the 1984 Summer Olympics in Los Angeles.

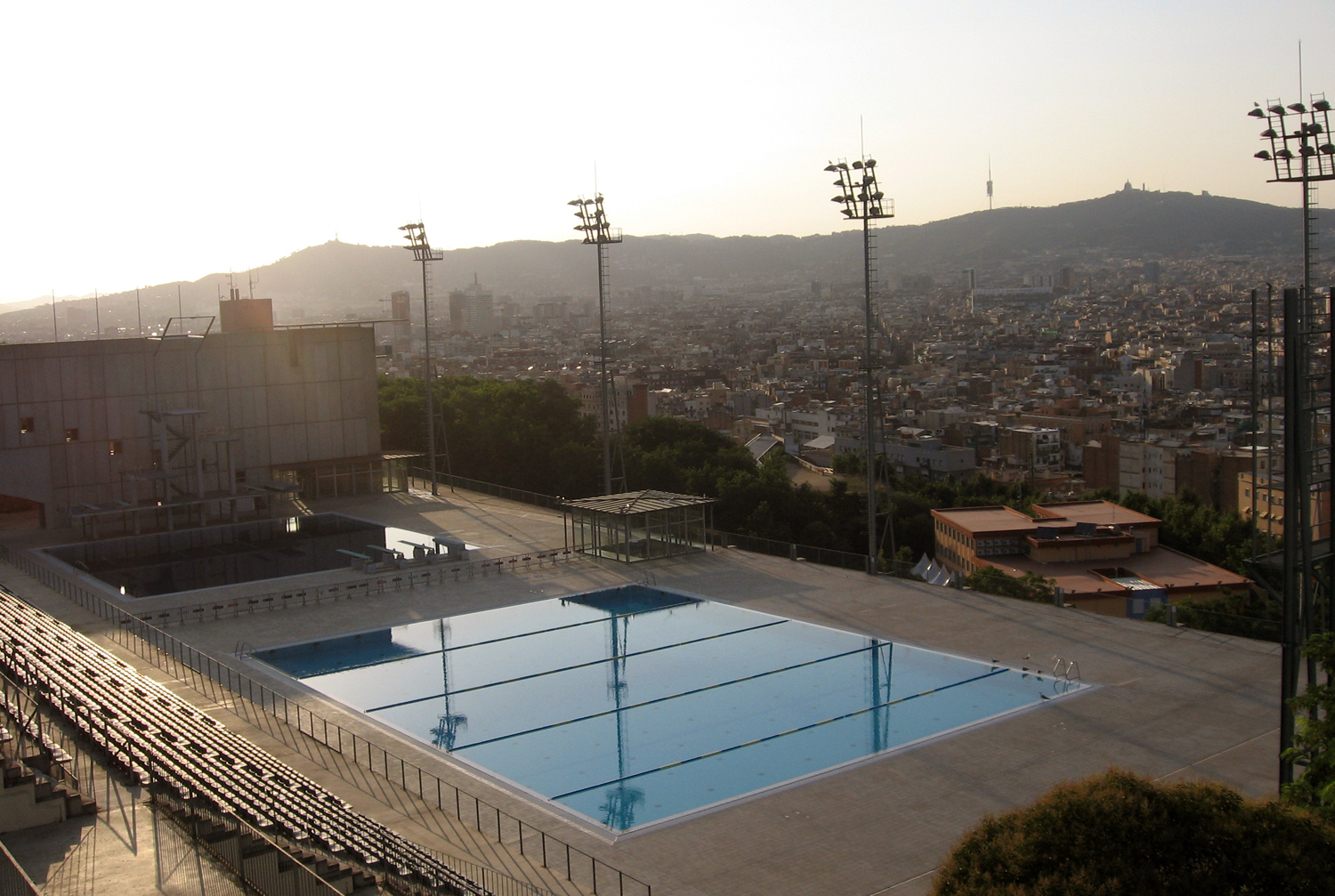
Piscina Municipal de Montjuïc hosted diving at the 1992 Summer Olympics in Barcelona.

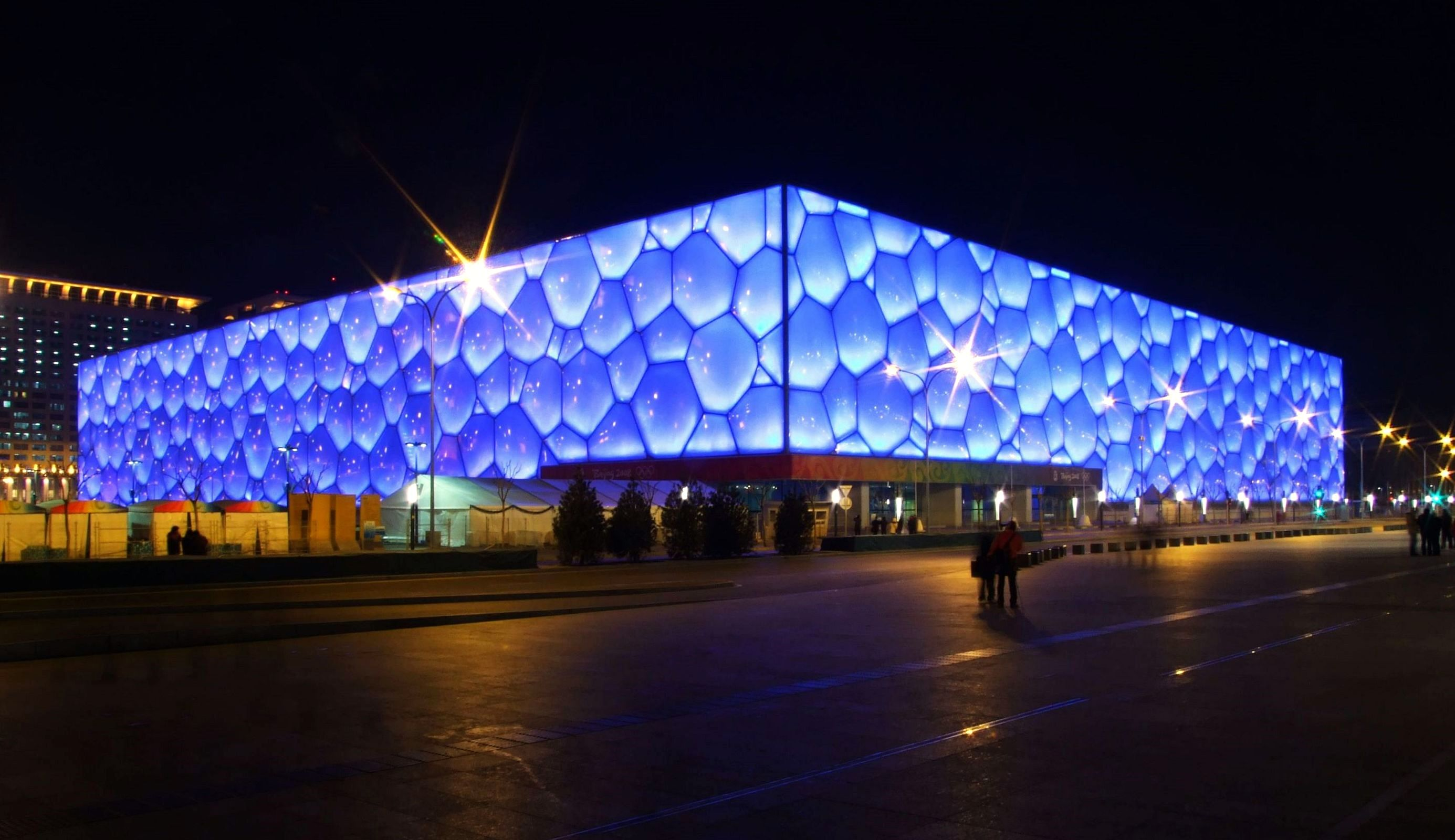
The National Aquatics Centre hosted diving at the 2008 Summer Olympics in Beijing.

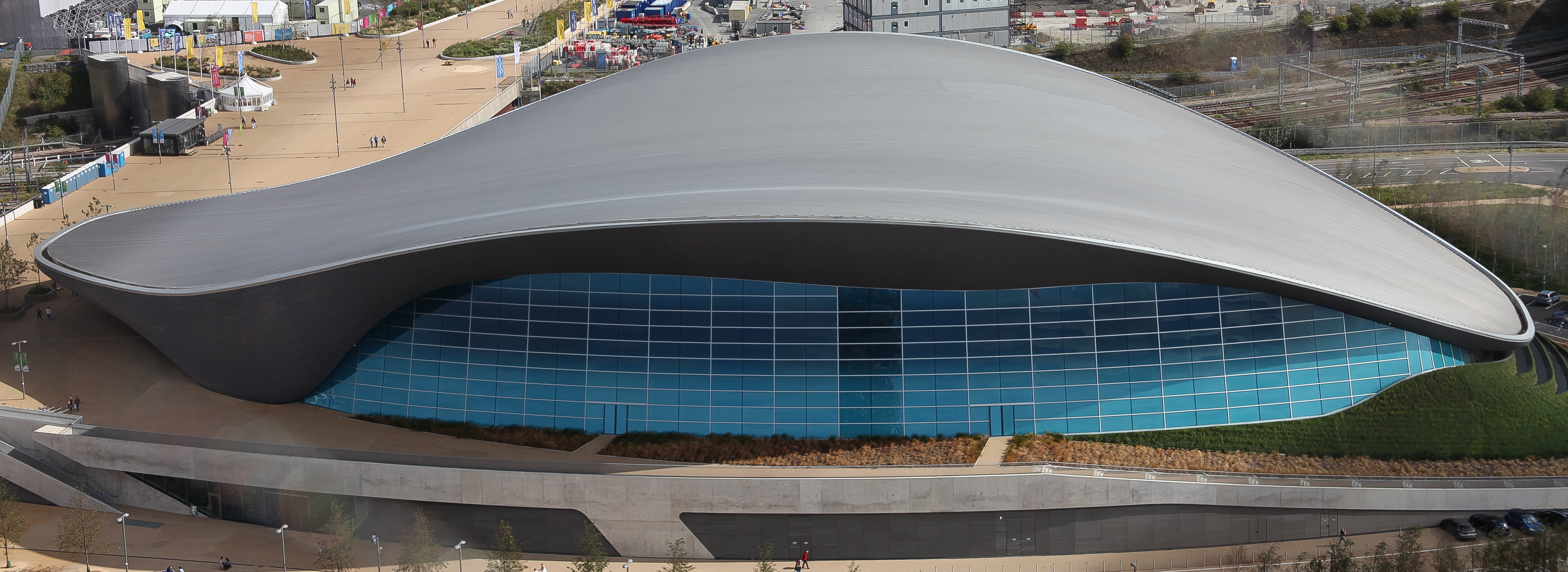
The London Aquatics Centre hosted diving at the 2012 Summer Olympics.

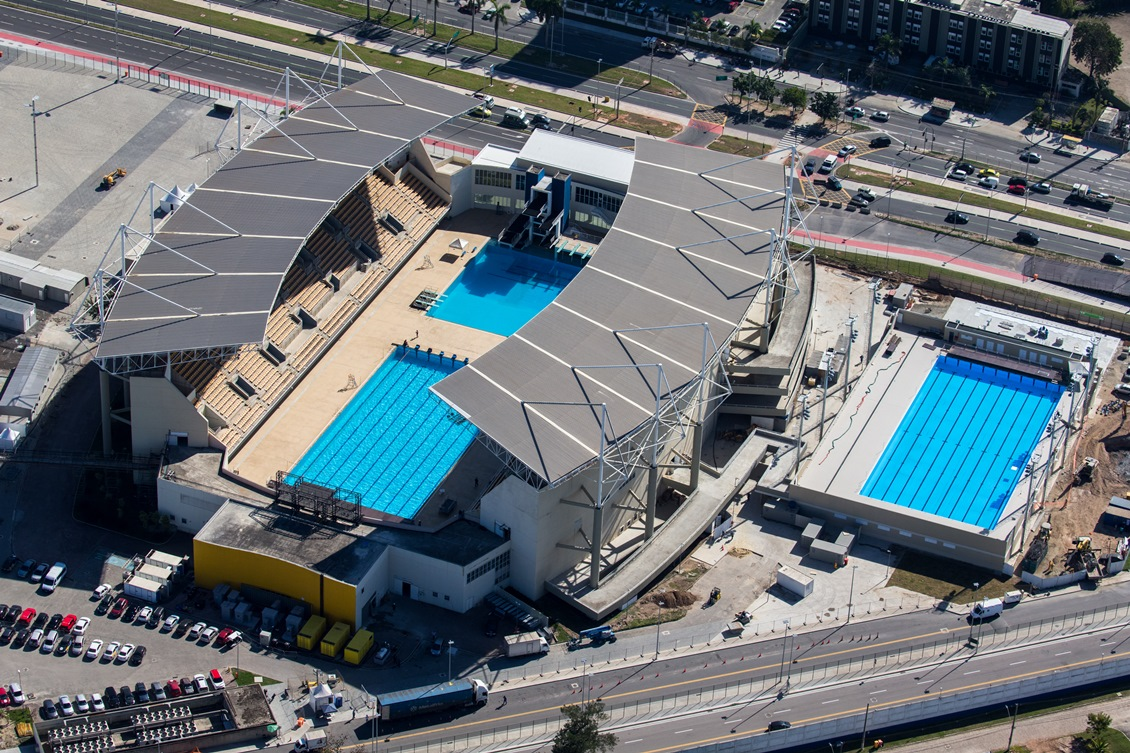
The Maria Lenk Aquatics Centre hosted diving at the 2016 Summer Olympics in Rio de Janeiro.

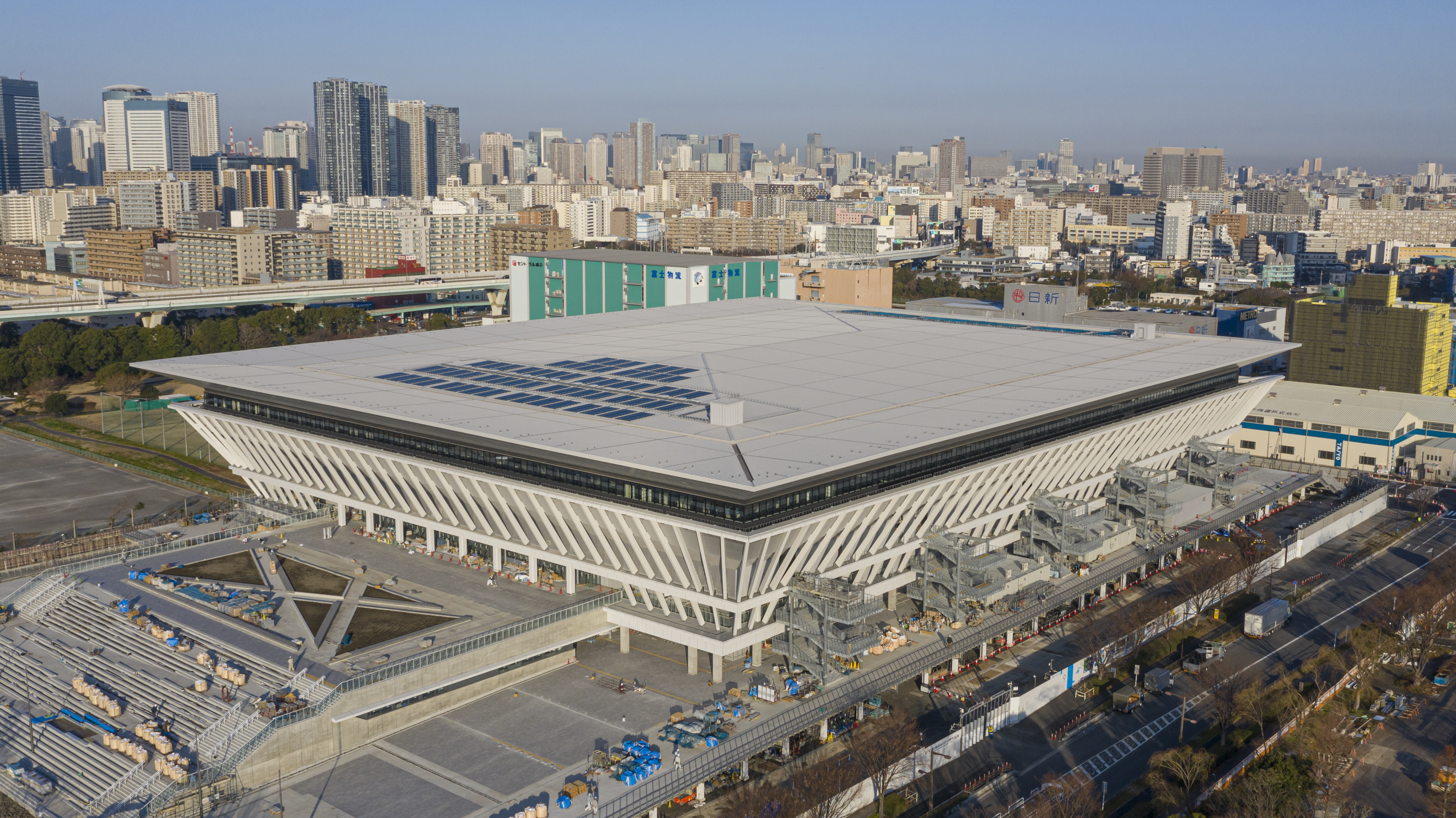
The Tokyo Aquatics Centre hosted diving at the 2020 Summer Olympics.

The Paris Aquatic Centre hosted diving at the 2024 Summer Olympics.

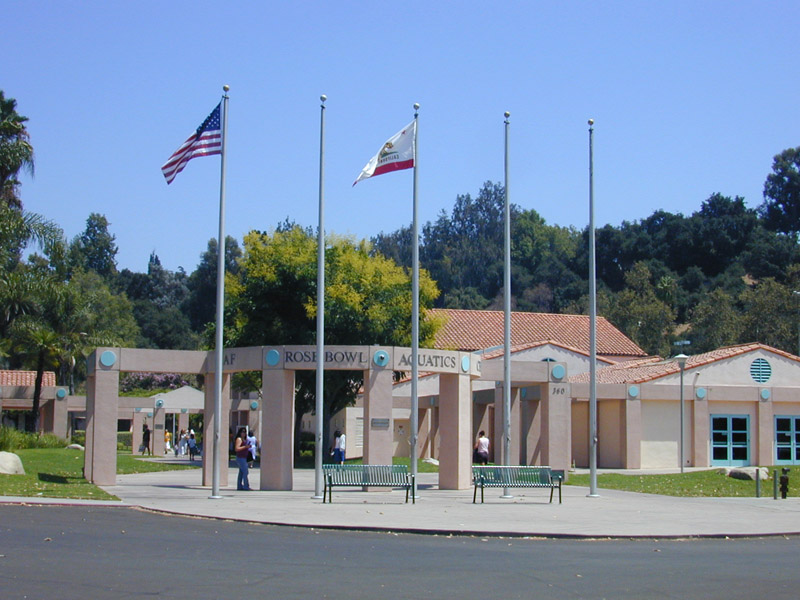
The Rose Bowl Aquatics Center will host diving at the 2028 Summer Olympics in Los Angeles.
