= Bob Webster =

American diver (born 1938)

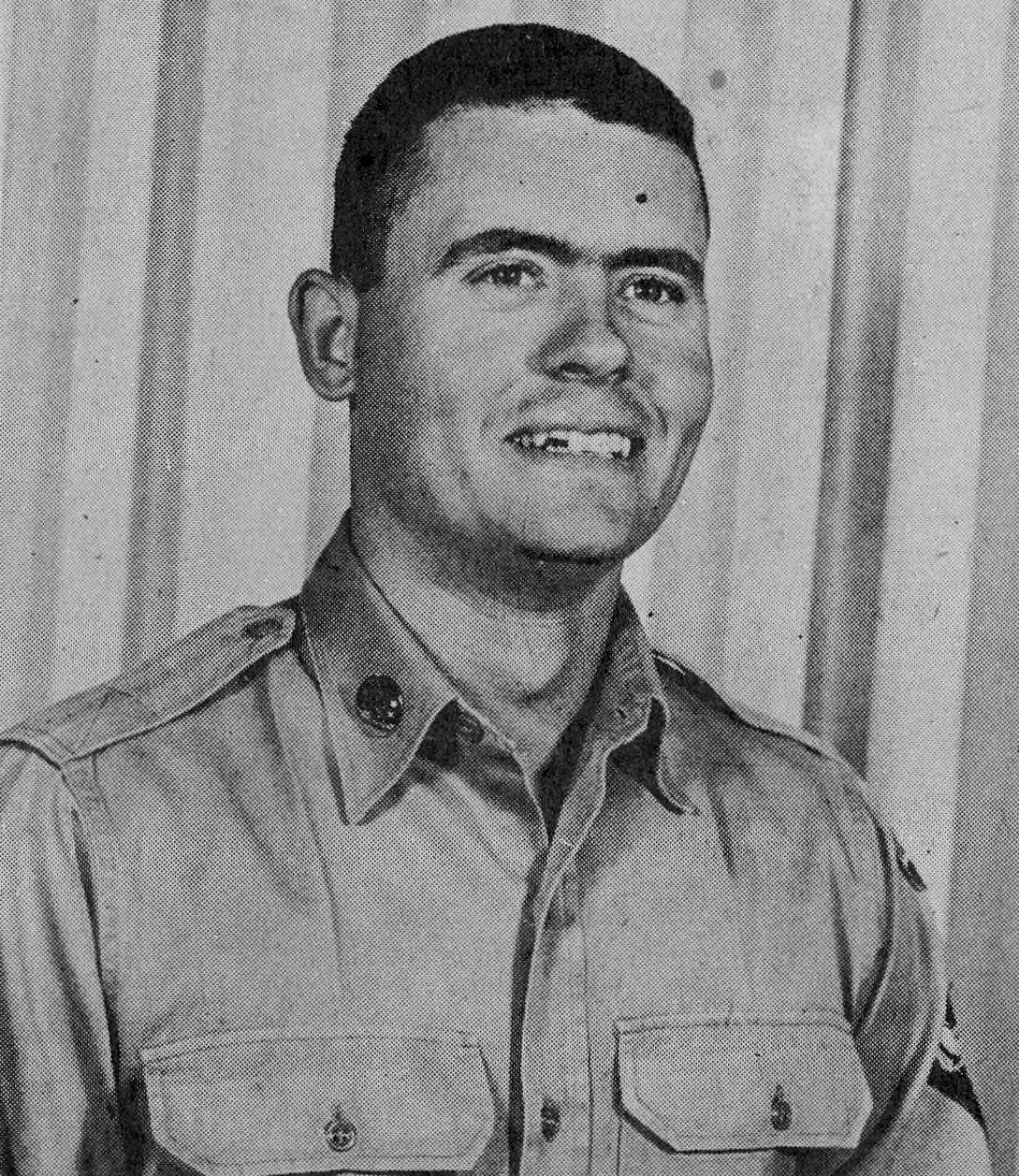
- Webster, circa 1965

Personal information
- Born: October 25, 1938 (age 87) Berkeley, California, U.S.
- Education: University of Michigan
- Height: 175 cm (5 ft 9 in)
- Weight: 63 kg (139 lb)

Sport
- Sport: Diving
- Club: Sammy Lee Swim Club
Medal record
Representing the United States
Olympic Games
Gold medal – first place	1960 Rome	10 m platform
Gold medal – first place	1964 Tokyo	10 m platform
Pan American Games
Bronze medal – third place	1959 Chicago	3 m springboard
Gold medal – first place	1963 São Paulo	10 m platform

Robert David "Bob" Webster (born October 25, 1938) is a retired American diver who won the 10 m platform event at every competition he entered between 1960 and 1964, including the 1960 and 1964 Olympics and 1963 Pan American Games. He later became a diving coach at the University of Minnesota, Princeton University, and the University of Alabama. He was inducted into the International Swimming Hall of Fame in 1970 and the University of Michigan Athletic Hall of Honor in 1989.

== Competitive diving ==
Born in Berkeley, California, Webster won his first collegiate diving title for Santa Ana Junior College, a school that did not have a pool. While at Santa Ana, Webster trained off a board in Olympic champion Sammy Lee's backyard sand pit. In 1957, Webster led the Santa Ana Dons to second and third-place finishes at the conference and state swimming and diving competitions. Sammy Lee was Webster's swimming coach at Santa Ana. Lee said, "Diving-wise, he was the greatest competitor I've ever coached. He really held up under competition, as both of his Olympic medals were by narrow margins. I told him early on that he could be an Olympic champion and Bob finally said, 'If you're serious, I'm serious.' I wrote to the University of Michigan and told them I had the next Olympic champion right here at Santa Ana College. They offered him a scholarship. The rest is history."

Webster then transferred to the University of Michigan where he was coached by Dick Kimball and Bruce Harlan. He won the gold medal in the 1960 Olympics with a score of 165.56 on September 2, 1960. His 1960 score on the platform was an Olympic record that remained unbroken when the scoring system was changed in 1972. At the 1960 Olympics, only his coaches gave Webster much of a chance against Gary Tobian of the U.S. and Britain's Brian Phelps. But Webster saved his most difficult dives, and took the lead from Tobian with a near perfect 2½ somersault on his second to last dive. The margin of victory between Webster and silver medalist Tobian was less than one-third of a point—the narrowest in Olympic history.

Rank	Diver	Preliminary		Semi-final				Final		
Rank	Diver	Points	Rank	Points	Rank	Total	Rank	Points	Rank	Total
	Bob Webster (USA)	52.21	9	47.51	2	99.72	3	65.84	1	165.56
	Gary Tobian (USA)	54.10	4	51.98	1	106.08	1	59.17	2	165.25
	Brian Phelps (GBR)	57.35	1	44.50	3	101.85	2	55.28	4	157.13

He won the gold medal again in the 1964 Olympics with a score of 148.58 on October 18, 1964. He was only the second diver to win the platform event in consecutive Olympic games, after his coach Sammy Lee accomplished the feat in 1948 and 1952. In 1964, he won the gold by another narrow margin over Italy's Klaus Dibiasi.

Rank	Diver	Preliminary		Final		
Rank	Diver	Points	Rank	Points	Rank	Total
	Bob Webster (USA)	93.18	6	55.40	1	148.58
	Klaus Dibiasi (ITA)	97.62	1	49.92	5	147.54
	Tom Gompf (USA)	92.79	7	53.78	2	146.57

Webster won every tower diving competition he entered from 1960 to 1964, including a gold medal in the 1963 Pan American Games in São Paulo, Brazil and the U.S. National AAU championships from 1960 to 1964. He was the first U.S. diver to win the platform event in the history of the Pan American Games. He also won the U.S. National AAU championship in the 1-meter springboard in 1962 and the Big Ten Conference championship in the 3-meter springboard in 1960.

== Diving coach ==
After retiring from competitive diving, Webster became the diving coach at the University of Minnesota. Webster was diving coach at Princeton from 1966 to 1975. He was also the coach for the U.S. diving team at the 1971 Pan American Games in Cali, Colombia. He later became the diving coach at the University of Alabama where he was named SEC Coach of the Year in 1981.

== Awards and honors ==
Webster was inducted into the International Swimming Hall of Fame in 1970, and the University of Michigan Athletic Hall of Honor in 1989.

== See also ==
- List of members of the International Swimming Hall of Fame
- Diving at the 1960 Summer Olympics – Men's 10 metre platform
- Diving at the 1964 Summer Olympics – Men's 10 metre platform
- University of Michigan Athletic Hall of Honor
