= Diving at the 1955 Pan American Games =

This page shows the results of the Diving Competition for men and women at the 1955 Pan American Games, held from March 12 to March 26, 1955 in Mexico City, Mexico. There were two events, for both men and women.

== Medal table ==
Place	Nation	Gold medal	Silver medal	Bronze medal	Total
1	United States	2	4	3	9
2	Mexico	2	0	1	3
Total		4	4	4	12

== Medalists ==
=== Men ===
Event	Gold	Silver	Bronze
3 m springboard	Joaquín Capilla; Mexico	Arthur Coffey; United States	Bob Clotworthy; United States
10 m platform	Joaquín Capilla; Mexico	Bob Clotworthy; United States	Gary Tobian; United States

=== Women ===
Event	Gold	Silver	Bronze
3 m springboard	Pat McCormick; United States	Jeanne Stunyo; United States	Emily Houghton; United States
10 m platform	Pat McCormick; United States	Juno Stover-Irwin; United States	Margarita Pesado; Mexico

== See also ==
- Diving at the 1956 Summer Olympics
