= Diving at the 2028 Summer Olympics =

Diving at the Games of the XXXIV Olympiad
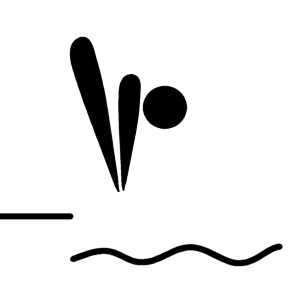
- Venue: Rose Bowl Aquatics Center
- Dates: 16 July – 28 July 2028
- No. of events: 8 (4 men, 4 women)
- Competitors: 136 from ## nations

Diving is to be contested at the 2028 Los Angeles Summer Olympics. Events are scheduled to occur between 16 and 22 June and 25 to 28 June 2028. All diving events are to be held at the Rose Bowl Aquatics Centre in Pasadena, California, and will be governed by World Aquatics. Eight medal events will be contested, consisting of men's 3 metre springboard, women's 3 metre springboard, men's 10 metre platform, women's 10 metre platform, men's synchronised 3 metre springboard, women's synchronised 3 metre springboard, men's synchronised 10 metre platform and women's synchronised 10 metre platform. Diving was first contested at an Olympic Games at the 1904 St. Louis games, with men's platform diving. Women's platform diving was introduced at the 1912 Stockholm Games.

== Venue ==
All diving competitions for the Olympic Games of 2028 will be held at the Rose Bowl Aquatics Centre, Pasadena, California. The unanimous decision that Rose Bowl Aquatics Centre will become the venue for diving was made in September 2025 according to the LA28 strategy aimed at maximum exploitation of the already existing venues instead of building new ones.

The Rose Bowl Aquatics Centre is an athletics and aquatics venue situated in the Arroyo Seco Canyon. Opened in 1990, it was used for holding U.S. National Diving Championships and as an Olympic athletes' training ground. However, some improvements will have to be done for hosting Olympic Games, and the minimum level of modification required became the decisive factor in choosing this venue for diving.

== Events ==
Across the 2028 Summer Games, eight diving events will be contested. They will consist of 3 metre springboard, 10 metre platform, 3 metre springboard synchronised, and 10 metre platform synchronised. Each will have a men's and women's event.

Event	Men's	Women's
3 Metre Springboard	✓	✓
10 Metre Platform	✓	✓
3 Metre Synchronised Springboard	✓	✓
10 Metre Synchronised Platform	✓	✓

== Qualification ==
The qualification events for the 2028 Summer Olympics will determine which 132 divers will participate in the eight diving competitions at the Games. The allocation of quota spots for National Olympic Committees (NOCs) will be based on World Aquatics tournaments and rules. In addition, as the host nation, the United States qualifies for eight quota spots for the synchronized diving events.

The other quota spots will be awarded via qualification tournaments conducted by World Aquatics. The first qualification tournament will be the 2027 World Aquatics Championships in Budapest, taking place in June and July 2027. This will be followed by the continental championships and the first and second leg of the World Aquatics Diving World Cup in 2028.

The maximum number of synchronised diving teams per event allowed by each National Olympic Committee is one, while the maximum number of individual athletes per event allowed is two. In total, there will be 34 individual athletes in each individual event and eight synchronised teams of two athletes each in each synchronised event.

Individual athletes' qualifications will go through three stages. Stage one will happen during the 2027 World Aquatics Championships in Budapest, where the top eight finishers of each event will get the quota places, but not more than two per country. Stage two will happen in the continental championships, where only the highest ranked qualified diver will earn a quota place. The last stage will take place during the World Aquatics Diving World Cup stops in 2028, where the rest of the quota places will be allocated, making sure that all five continents: Africa, Asia, Europe, Oceania, and the Americas are represented.

Synchronised qualification will skip the first two stages and will start from the third stage during the 2028 World Aquatics Diving World Cup stops. The seven teams who participate in these tournaments will be awarded a quota spot each, but the United States will hold the remaining quota spot as a host country.

Qualification Event	Date	Location	Quota Places
Host Nation	N/A	N/A	8 (Synchronised Events)
2027 World Aquatics Championships	June 26 - July 4, 2027	(Hungary) Budapest	Individual Quotas
Continental Championships	2027	Various	Individual Quotas
World Aquatics Diving World Cup Stops 1 and 2	2028	TBD	Remaining Individual and Synchronised Quotas

== Competition Schedule ==
Diving at the 2028 Olympics will take place between 16 and 22 July as well as 25 to 28 July.

Event / Date	16 July	17 July	18 July	19 July	20 July	21 July	22 July	25 July	26 July	27 July	28 July
Men's 3 Metre Springboard			P SF	F							
Women's 3 Metre Springboard	P	SF F									
Men's 10 Metre Platform						P	SF F				
Women's 10 Metre Platform					P SF	F					
Men's Synchronised 3 Metre Springboard									F		
Women's Synchronised 3 Metre Springboard								F			
Men's Synchronised 10 Metre Platform											F
Women's Synchronised 10 Metre Platform										F	

Legend:

- P - Preliminary Round
- SF - Semi-Final
- F - Final

== See also ==
- Diving at the Summer Olympics
- Diving at the 2024 Summer Olympics
- 2028 Summer Olympics
