= Álvaro Gaxiola =

Mexican diver (1937–2003)

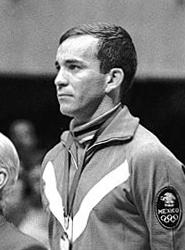
- Gaxiola at the 1968 Olympics

Personal information
- Born: 26 January 1937 Guadalajara, Jalisco, Mexico
- Died: 18 August 2003 (aged 66) Guadalajara, Jalisco, Mexico
- Education: University of Michigan

Sport
- Sport: Diving
- Club: Michigan Wolverines, Ann Arbor
Medal record
Representing Mexico
Olympic Games
Silver medal – second place	1968 Mexico City	10 m platform
Pan American Games
Gold medal – first place	1959 Chicago	10 m platform
Silver medal – second place	1963 São Paulo	10 m platform

Juan Álvaro José Gaxiola Robles (26 January 1937 – 18 August 2003) was a Mexican diver. He competed at the 1960, 1964 and 1968 Olympics in the 3 m springboard and 10 m platform and won a silver medal in the platform in 1968, in Mexico City. He also finished fourth in the springboard in 1960.

Gaxiola lived for many years in the United States and returned to Mexico only in the 1960s. He competed in diving for Ann Arbor High School and then for the University of Michigan, where he studied civil engineering.

Gaxiola died of cancer in his native Guadalajara, aged 66. He was survived by wife Sylvia Wydell and three children, Ingi, Michelle, and Annika.
