= Juno Stover-Irwin =

American diver (1928–2011)

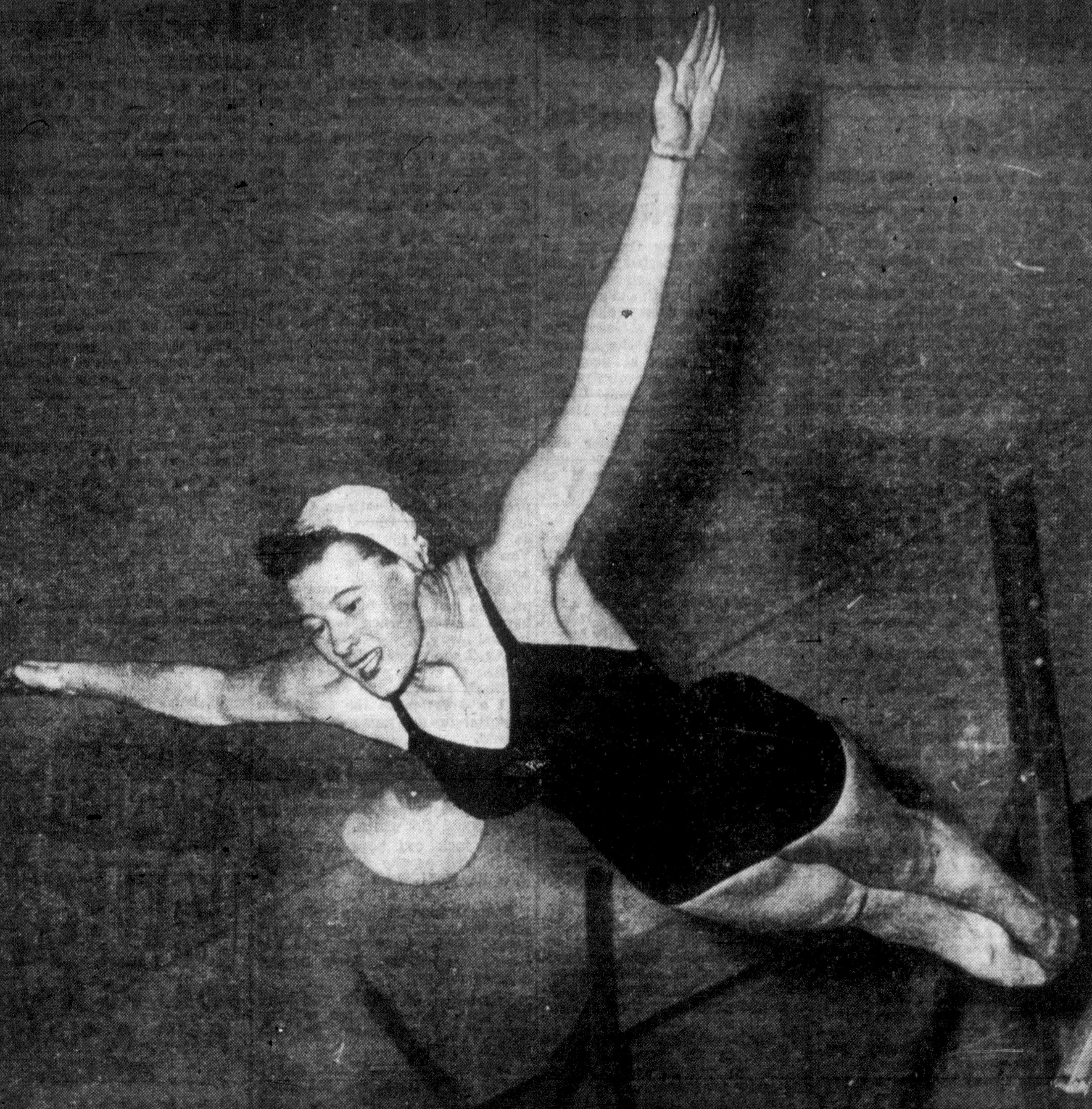
- Stover-Irwin, circa 1949

Personal information
- Born: November 22, 1928 Los Angeles, California, U.S.
- Died: July 2, 2011 (aged 82)
Medal record
Women's diving
Representing the United States
Olympic Games
Bronze medal – third place	1952 Helsinki	Platform
Silver medal – second place	1956 Melbourne	Platform
Pan American Games
Silver medal – second place	1955 Mexico City	Platform
Silver medal – second place	1959 Chicago	Platform

Juno Stover-Irwin (November 22, 1928 – July 2, 2011) was a four-time Olympic diver for the United States in 1948, 1952, 1956 and 1960 Primarily a 10-meter platform performer, Irwin was a native of Los Angeles, California; she attended Hoover High School and Glendale Community College. Juno was three and a half months pregnant when she took the bronze medal at the Helsinki Olympic Games. She travelled to competitions with her ukulele which she played for relaxation and enjoyment.

== Biography ==
As Juno Stover, she placed fifth at the 1948 Olympics in London. Four years later in Helsinki, as Juno Stover-Irwin, she captured a bronze medal. At the 1956 Olympics, in Melbourne, Australia, Stover-Irwin was the 10-meter platform silver medalist. Irwin would later become the first diver to compete in four Olympics, when she placed fourth at the 1960 Games in Rome. Stover-Irwin was also a two-time USA National AAU champion and two-time Pan-American Games silver medalist.

Upon retiring from active competition, Stover-Irwin coached the women's diving team at California State University (Berkeley Campus). She was honored with induction to the International Swimming Hall of Fame in 1980. She was the mother of five children born between 1951 and 1965.

== See also ==
- List of members of the International Swimming Hall of Fame
- Diving at the 1952 Olympics
- Diving at the 1956 Olympics
- Diving at the 1955 Pan-American Games
- Diving at the 1959 Pan-American Games
