= Juan Botella =

Mexican diver (1941–1970)

Personal information
- Full name: Juan Botella Medina
- Born: 4 July 1941
- Died: 17 July 1970 (aged 29)
Medal record
Men's diving
Representing Mexico
Olympic Games
Bronze medal – third place	1960 Rome	3 m springboard
Pan American Games
Bronze medal – third place	1959 Chicago	10 m platform

Juan Botella Medina (4 July 1941 – 17 July 1970) was a Mexican diver. He was born in Mexico City.

He competed for Mexico at the 1960 Summer Olympics held in Rome, where he won the bronze medal in the men's springboard event.

== Death ==
He died on 17 July 1970, in Basurto, Mexico City, working on his thesis on architecture, because of hypertension suffering for a long time.
