= Joaquín Capilla =

Mexican diver (1928–2010)

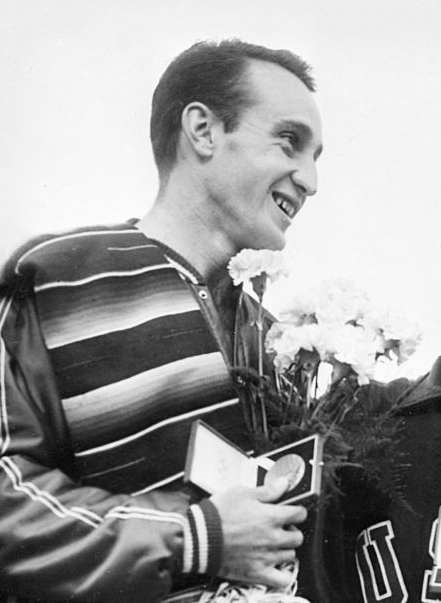
- Capilla at the 1952 Olympics

Personal information
- Born: December 23, 1928 Mexico City, Mexico
- Died: May 8, 2010 (aged 81) Mexico City, Mexico

Sport
- Sport: Diving
Medal record
Representing Mexico
Olympic Games
Gold medal – first place	1956 Melbourne	Platform
Silver medal – second place	1952 Helsinki	Platform
Bronze medal – third place	1948 London	Platform
Bronze medal – third place	1956 Melbourne	Springboard
Pan American Games
Gold medal – first place	1951 Buenos Aires	Springboard
Gold medal – first place	1951 Buenos Aires	Platform
Gold medal – first place	1955 Mexico City	Springboard
Gold medal – first place	1955 Mexico City	Platform

Joaquín Capilla Pérez (December 23, 1928 – May 8, 2010), was a Mexican diver who won the largest number of Olympic medals among Mexican athletes. Together with his elder brother Alberto he competed in the 3 m springboard and 10 m platform at the 1948, 1952 and 1956 Olympics and won one gold, one silver and two bronze medals, finishing fourth in the two remaining competitions. He also won four medals at the Pan American Games, in 1951 and 1955. After retiring from competitions Capilla descended into poverty, chain smoking and alcoholism, eventually losing his family and home. He recovered owing to religion and later earned a degree in theology. In 2009 he was awarded the National Sports Award. He died the next year in 2010 as a result of cardiac arrest, at the age of 81.
