= Bob Clotworthy =

American diver and coach (1931–2018)

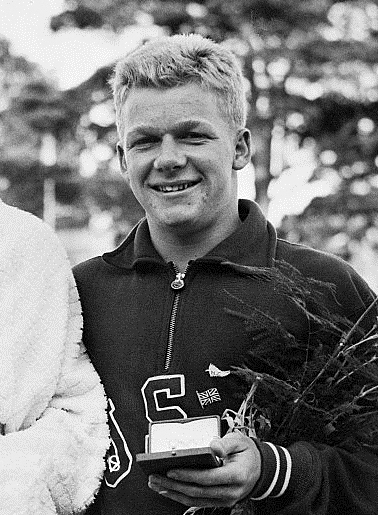
- Clotworthy at the 1952 Olympics

Personal information
- Full name: Robert Lynn Clotworthy
- Born: May 8, 1931 Newark, New Jersey, U.S.
- Died: June 1, 2018 (aged 87) Salt Lake City, Utah, U.S.
- Height: 5 ft 3 in (160 cm)
- Weight: 132 lb (60 kg)
- Spouse: Cynthia Gill

Sport
- Sport: Diving
- College team: Ohio State University
- Club: Plainfield Swim Club; Westfield YMCA; New York Athletic Club
- Coached by: Mike Peppe (Ohio U.)
Medal record
Representing the United States
Olympic Games
Gold medal – first place	1956 Melbourne	3 m springboard
Bronze medal – third place	1952 Helsinki	3 m springboard
Pan American Games
Bronze medal – third place	1955 Mexico City	3 m springboard
Silver medal – second place	1955 Mexico City	10 m platform
Representing Ohio State
NCAA
Gold medal – first place	1953 Columbus	3 meter diving

Robert Lynn Clotworthy (May 8, 1931 – June 1, 2018) was an American diver and swimmer for Ohio State, and a 1956 Olympic gold and 1952 bronze medalist in the 3-meter springboard. He later had a successful career as a coach from around 1955-76, with his longest stint at Princeton from 1958-1970 where he led the team to the 1962 Eastern Seaboard Championships, and produced Princeton's first Olympic gold medalist in swimming, Jed Graef.

== Early life ==
Clotworthy was born in Newark, New Jersey and grew up in nearby Westfield. He began training for his Olympic career in high school, spending hours each day practicing dives and perfecting them. Clotworthy dove for the Westfield High School team, Plainfield Swim Club and Westfield YMCA, where he was coached by Ed Gillen and Stan Dudeck. He competed for the Olympics, representing the New York Athletic Club, where he continued to train. Others who helped train and coach Clotworthy during his career were Hobie Billingsley, Phil Moriarty, Charlie Batterman, and Glen and Pat McCormick.

== Olympics ==
Clotworthy competed in the 3 m springboard at the 1952 and 1956 Olympics and won a bronze and a gold medal, respectively.

At the 1952 Helsinki Olympic 3-meter springboard competition, Clotworthy scored a 184.92 taking the bronze, behind Americans Skippy Browning, who took the gold and Miller Anderson, who took the silver. Americans had a history of dominance in the event and had swept it in every Olympics from 1932-52. Clotworthy would improve on his performance in the 1956 games.

In the 1956 Melbourne Games in 3-meter springboard, Clotworthy captured the gold medal but had finished second in the qualifying round to Mexican diver Joaquín Capilla, who had previously won a 1956 gold medal in platform diving. Increasing his focus, Clotworthy scored higher in the final round, easily outscoring Capilla who dropped down to a bronze medal. American Don Harper, had the highest scores in the final round, but as he had scored fifth in the qualifying round which counted in the final scoring, he could only move up to the Silver medal.

Clotworthy won two medals at the 1955 Pan American Games capturing a silver medal in platform diving and a bronze medal in the 3 meter springboard. He met Cynthia Gill at the '55 Pan Am Games, after she won the 100-meter backstroke bronze medal.

=== Ohio State ===
Clotworthy attended Ohio State University under the guidance of diving and swimming Hall of Fame Head Coach Mike Peppe where he majored in Physical Education, graduating in 1954. At Ohio State he won an NCAA Championship title in 3m springboard diving in 1953, and earned 5 Big Ten Conference titles in 1-meter and 3-meter springboard diving. After graduating from Ohio State, he continued his competitive career competing for the New York Athletic Club.

=== Marriage ===
After meeting at the 1955 Pan Am Games, Clotworthy married Cynthia Gill, on March 22, 1958 at St. Thomas Episcopal Church in Hanover, New Hampshire while Bob was coaching swimming and diving at Dartmouth University. Gill had attended Fort Lauderdale's Pine Crest School, an exceptional swim program and had competed for the Fort Lauderdale Swimming Association. Shortly after his marriage, Clotworthy was chosen by the International Educational Exchange Service, of the U.S. State Department, to give swimming and diving exhibitions from June–September, 1958, as a good will gesture in Malaya, Japan, Ceylon, Singapore, Thailand, Egypt, and Morocco, and later spend a week at the World’s Fair in Brussels, Belgium. He was accompanied by his wife Cynthia, and the couple referred to the trip as an 107-day around-the-world honeymoon.

== Coaching swimming and diving ==
After retiring from competition in 1956, Clotworthy coached at West Point from 1955–56, at Dartmouth College in 1958, at Princeton University from 1958–70, at Arizona State University from 1970–71 and at the University of Texas at Austin from 1972-76. He later coached at University of Wisconsin-Eau Claire from 1981-1984. After joining the Peace Corps in 1970, he was stationed in Caracas, Venezuela, and taught diving to Venezuelan coaches in Venezuela. During his longest stint as a coach at Princeton, the team won the 1962 Eastern Seaboard Championships and produced Olympian Jed Graef.

=== Outstanding students coached ===
From 1981 through 1984, he produced six National American Intercolligate Association (NAIA) champions at the University of Wisconsin-Eau Claire. He mentored Olympic medalists and Princeton swimmer Jed Graef to a Gold medal in backstroke in the 1964 Tokyo Olympics and Princeton swimmer Ross Wales to a Mexico City Olympic bronze medal in 1968. Clotworthy’s swimmers won almost as many national titles as he had earned as a diver, with a total of five collectively earned by Jed Graef, Ross Wales and Gardiner Green.

After retiring to Taos, New Mexico, he coached and taught at Albuquerque Academy. In his late years, he became known as an American diving historian, and was working to write a lengthy history of the sport before his death on June 1, 2018 in Salt Lake City, Utah.

== Honors ==
In 1980 he was inducted into the International Swimming Hall of Fame.

== National titles and accomplishments ==
- 1951 AAU Outdoor Nationals 3 meter champion.
- 1953 AAU Indoor Nationals 1 meter champion.
- 1953 AAU Outdoor Nationals 3 meter champion.
- 1956 AAU Indoor Nationals 1 meter champion.
- 1956 AAU Outdoor Nationals 3 meter champion.

== Coaching accomplishments ==
- 1955–56 Coached diving at West Point.
- 1958 Coached diving at Dartmouth College.
- 1958 Coached diving at Dartmouth College.
- 1958–70 Coached swimming and diving at Princeton University.
- 1970–71 Coached diving at the Arizona State University.
- 1972–76 Coached diving at the University of Texas.
- 1980–1984 Coached diving at the University of Wisconsin-Eau Claire.
- 1984–1996 Coached diving at Albuquerque Academy, New Mexico.
- 1997–2006 Coached Age Group Swimming – Taos Swim Club, Taos, New Mexico.

== See also ==
- List of members of the International Swimming Hall of Fame
