= Gary Tobian =

American diver (born 1935)

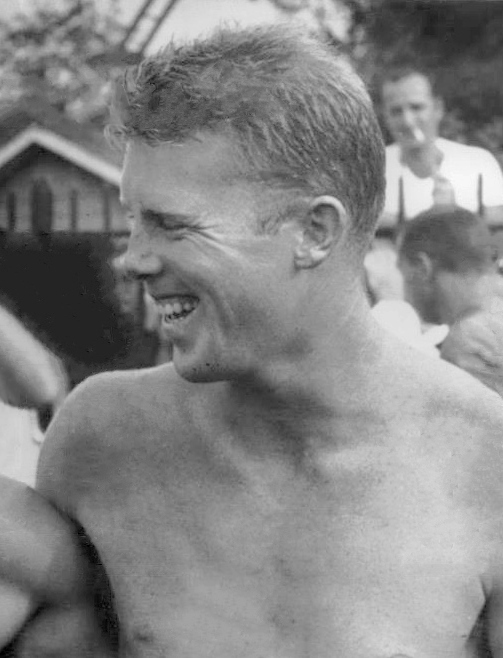
- Tobian in 1960

Personal information
- Born: August 14, 1935 (age 90) Detroit, Michigan, U.S.
- Height: 183 cm (6 ft 0 in)
- Weight: 73 kg (161 lb)

Sport
- Sport: Diving
- Club: LAAC, Los Angeles
Medal record
Representing the United States
Olympic Games
Silver medal – second place	1956 Melbourne	Platform
Gold medal – first place	1960 Rome	Springboard
Silver medal – second place	1960 Rome	Platform
Pan American Games
Bronze medal – third place	1955 Mexico City	Platform
Gold medal – first place	1959 Chicago	Springboard

Gary Milburn Tobian (born August 14, 1935) is a retired American diver. He competed in the 1956 and 1960 Summer Olympics and won a gold or silver medal in all his events: a gold in the 3 m springboard in 1960 and two silvers in the 10 m platform. Tobian held six Association of American Universities (AAU) titles in the platform, and won the springboard at the 1958 AAU Championships and at the 1959 Pan American Games. In 1978, he was inducted into the International Swimming Hall of Fame.

Tobian was a successful businessman. He was married to the Olympic swimmer Marley Shriver, but they later divorced.

== See also ==
- List of members of the International Swimming Hall of Fame
