= Ingrid Gulbin =

East German diver (born 1943)

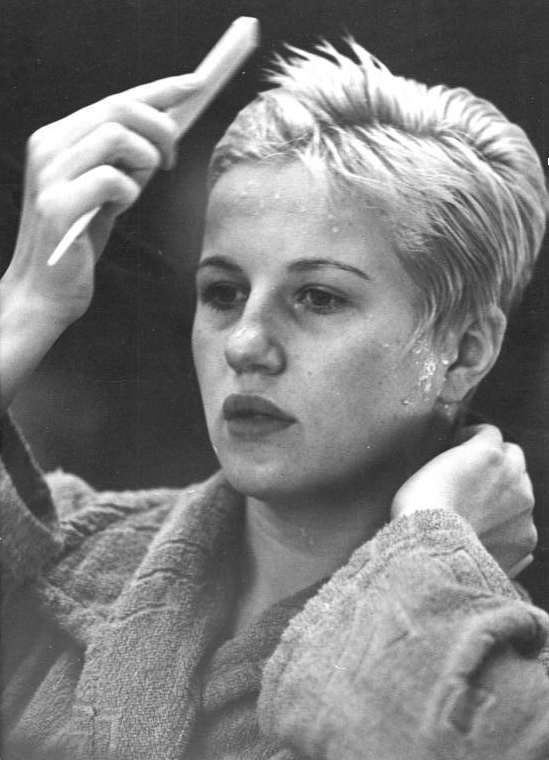
- Engel-Krämer in 1964

Personal information
- Born: 29 July 1943 (age 83) Dresden, Germany
- Height: 1.58 m (5 ft 2 in)
- Weight: 56 kg (123 lb)

Sport
- Sport: Diving
- Club: SC Einheit Dresden; SC Empor Rostock
Medal record
Representing Germany
Olympic Games
Gold medal – first place	1960 Rome	Springboard
Gold medal – first place	1960 Rome	Platform
Gold medal – first place	1964 Tokyo	Springboard
Silver medal – second place	1964 Tokyo	Platform
European Championships
Gold medal – first place	1962 Leipzig	3 m springboard
Gold medal – first place	1962 Leipzig	10 m platform

Ingrid Gulbin (née Krämer then Engel-Krämer, born 29 July 1943) is a diver from East Germany, a multiple Olympic champion who won Olympic gold medals in both springboard and platform.

== Career ==
Krämer competed in the 1960 and 1964 Summer Olympics for the United Team of Germany. She won gold medals in springboard and platform diving in 1960. She was the German flag bearer at the 1964 Games, where she competed under the name Engel-Krämer and won a gold medal in springboard and a silver medal in platform diving. Four years later at the 1968 Games she competed for East Germany and used the name Gulbin. She finished fifth in the 3 metre springboard competition.

She finished fourth in the springboard and eighth in the platform at the 1958 European Aquatics Championships and won both events in 1962.

She retired after the 1968 Olympics to become a successful diving coach, training such athletes as Martina Jäschke, Beate Jahn, Jan Hempel, Michael Kühne, Heiko Meyer and Annett Gamm. She lost her job after the reunification of Germany and worked as a bank clerk.

== Personal life and awards ==
In November 1963 she married Hein Engel, a German weightlifter and coach, and at the 1964 Olympics competed as Engel-Krämer.

She was elected sportspersonality of the year 1960, 1962, 1963 and 1964 in East Germany. In 1960, she was also chosen sportspersonality of the year in West Germany, becoming the only person to win the award in both parts of Germany.

She was inducted into the International Swimming Hall of Fame in Fort Lauderdale, Florida in 1975.

== See also ==
- List of members of the International Swimming Hall of Fame
