= Pat McCormick (diver) =

American diver (1930–2023)

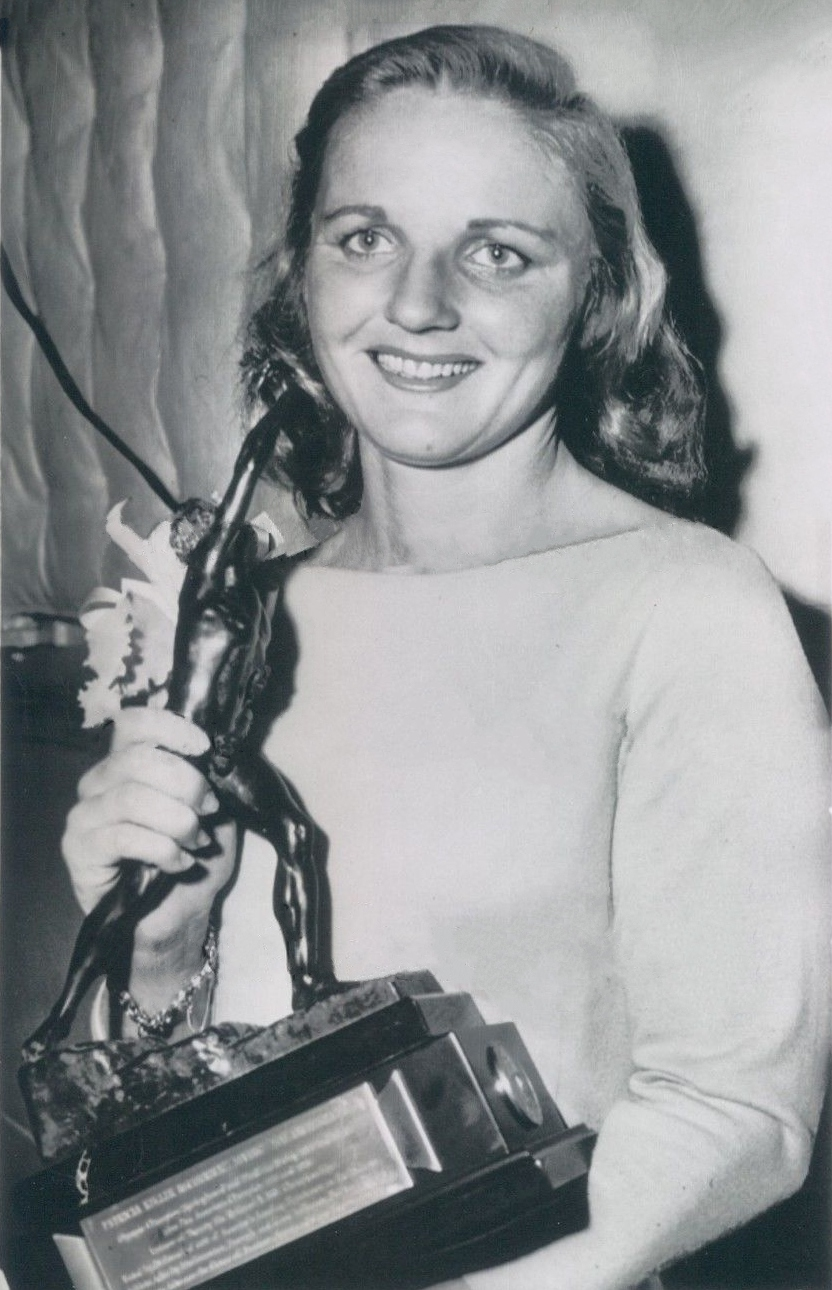
- McCormick in 1957

Personal information
- Full name: Patricia Joan McCormick
- Born: May 12, 1930 Seal Beach, California, U.S.
- Died: March 7, 2023 (aged 92) Orange County, California, U.S.
- Height: 162 cm (5 ft 4 in)
- Weight: 58 kg (128 lb)

Sport
- Sport: Diving
- Club: Los Angeles Athletic Club
Medal record
Women's diving
Representing the United States
Olympic Games
Gold medal – first place	1952 Helsinki	Springboard
Gold medal – first place	1952 Helsinki	Platform
Gold medal – first place	1956 Melbourne	Springboard
Gold medal – first place	1956 Melbourne	Platform
Pan American Games
Gold medal – first place	1951 Buenos Aires	Platform
Gold medal – first place	1955 Mexico City	Springboard
Gold medal – first place	1955 Mexico City	Platform
Silver medal – second place	1951 Buenos Aires	Springboard

Patricia Joan Keller McCormick (May 12, 1930 – March 7, 2023) was an American competitive diver who won both diving events at two consecutive Summer Olympics, in 1952 and 1956. She won the James E. Sullivan Award for best amateur athlete in the US in 1956 – the second woman to do so, after Ann Curtis.

As a child in the 1930s and 1940s she executed dives that were not allowed in competition for female divers (dives reputed to scare most men) and practiced cannonballs off the Los Alamitos Bridge in Long Beach, California Harbor. She attended Woodrow Wilson Classical High School, Long Beach City College, and California State University, Long Beach.

After the Olympics McCormick did diving tours and was a model for Catalina swimwear. She served on the Los Angeles 1984 Summer Olympics organizing committee and began a program called "Pat's Champs"—a foundation to help motivate kids to dream big and to set practical ways to succeed. McCormick's husband, Glenn, was a diving coach for her, as well as for other Olympic diving medalists. They divorced after 24 years of marriage. He died in 1995. They had two children, Tim, born in 1956, just five months before McCormick won two gold medals at the Melbourne Olympics, and Kelly (born 1960), who won two Olympic medals (silver, bronze) in diving. McCormick once appeared on an episode of To Tell the Truth on February 26, 1957 (she appeared as an imposter) and on an episode of You Bet Your Life (#58-28, aired April 2, 1959).

McCormick died in Orange County, California, on March 7, 2023, at the age of 92.

== See also ==
- List of members of the International Swimming Hall of Fame
