= Diving at the Summer Olympics =

- IOC Code: DIV
- Governing body: World Aquatics
- Events: 8 (men: 4; women: 4)

Summer Olympics
- 1896; 1900; 1904; 1908; 1912; 1920; 1924; 1928; 1932; 1936; 1948; 1952; 1956; 1960; 1964; 1968; 1972; 1976; 1980; 1984; 1988; 1992; 1996; 2000; 2004; 2008; 2012; 2016; 2020; 2024; 2028; 2032
- Medalists

Diving was introduced in the official programme of the Summer Olympic Games at the 1904 Games in St. Louis and has been contested at every Summer Games since. It was originally known as "fancy diving" for the acrobatic stunts performed by competitors during the dive (such as somersaults and twists). This discipline of aquatics, along with artistic swimming, marathon swimming, swimming and water polo, is regulated and supervised by World Aquatics (formerly known as FINA), the international federation (IF) for aquatic sports.

== Summary ==
Games	Year	Events	Best Nation
1			
2			
3	1904	2	United States (1)
4	1908	2	Germany (1); Sweden (1)
5	1912	4	Sweden (2)
6			
7	1920	5	United States (2)
8	1924	5	United States (3)
9	1928	4	United States (4)
10	1932	4	United States (5)
11	1936	4	United States (6)
12			
13			
14	1948	4	United States (7)
15	1952	4	United States (8)
16	1956	4	United States (9)
17	1960	4	United States (10)
18	1964	4	United States (11)
19	1968	4	United States (12)
20	1972	4	Italy (1); United States (13)
21	1976	4	United States (14)
22	1980	4	Soviet Union (1)
23	1984	4	United States (15)
24	1988	4	China (1)
25	1992	4	China (2)
26	1996	4	China (3)
27	2000	8	China (4)
28	2004	8	China (5)
29	2008	8	China (6)
30	2012	8	China (7)
31	2016	8	China (8)
32	2020	8	China (9)
33	2024	8	China (10)
34	2028	8	

== History ==
The first Olympic diving events were contested by men and consisted of a platform diving event ("fancy high diving") and also a plunge for distance event, which awarded victory to the diver who could reach the furthest underwater, while remaining motionless after a ground-level standing dive. At the 1908 Summer Olympics, men's springboard diving was added to the program and replaced the plunge for distance, which was regarded as uninteresting. The women's diving debut happened at the 1912 Summer Olympics in the platform event and was expanded to springboard diving at the 1920 Summer Olympics. A parallel platform diving event for men, called "plain high diving", was presented at the Games of the V Olympiad. No acrobatic moves were allowed, only a simple straight dive off the platform. It was last contested at the 1924 Summer Olympics after which it was merged with "fancy high diving" into one competition renamed "highboard diving" (or just "high diving").

By the time of the 1996 Summer Olympics, the diving events were exactly the same as in 1928 (two men's and two women's events). However, four years later in Sydney, the inclusion of a synchronized diving variant for the springboard and platform events elevated the list up to eight events (four men's and four women's events).

Another important change to the sport occurred at the 1984 Summer Olympics, when China first competed, after boycotting the previous games due to the political status of Taiwan. China has become the dominant diving power and accumulated 55 gold medals since 1984.

At the 2024 Summer Olympics in Paris, Chinese divers swept all of the available events, winning a record eight gold medals. The Chinese team also surpassed the United States in the all-time medal tally after this edition of the games.

== Medal table ==
Total medal count 1904–2024:

Rank	Nation	Gold	Silver	Bronze	Total
1	China	55	26	11	92
2	United States	49	47	46	142
3	Sweden	6	8	7	21
4	Russia	4	8	6	18
5	Soviet Union	4	4	6	14
6	Italy	3	5	3	11
7	Australia	3	4	8	15
8	United Team of Germany	3	1	0	4
9	Germany	2	8	12	22
10	Great Britain	2	4	12	18
11	East Germany	2	2	3	7
12	Mexico	1	8	8	17
13	Canada	1	5	9	15
14	Czechoslovakia	1	1	0	2
15	Denmark	1	0	1	2
16	Greece	1	0	0	1
17	Unified Team	0	2	1	3
18	Egypt	0	1	1	2
18	Malaysia	0	1	1	2
18	North Korea	0	1	1	2
21	France	0	1	0	1
21	Japan	0	1	0	1
23	Ukraine	0	0	2	2
24	ROC (ROC)	0	0	1	1
Totals (24 entries)		138	138	139	415

== Events ==
=== Men's ===
Event	96	00	04	08	12	20	24	28	32	36	48	52	56	60	64	68	72	76	80	84	88	92	96	00	04	08	12	16	20	24	28	Games
Plunge for distance			X	Not occurred since																												1
Plain high diving			–	–	X	X	X	Not occurred since																								3
3 metre springboard			–	X	X	X	X	X	X	X	X	X	X	X	X	X	X	X	X	X	X	X	X	X	X	X	X	X	X	X	X	28
10 metre platform			X	X	X	X	X	X	X	X	X	X	X	X	X	X	X	X	X	X	X	X	X	X	X	X	X	X	X	X	X	29
Synchronized 3 metre springboard			Not yet introduced																					X	X	X	X	X	X	X	X	8
Synchronized 10 metre platform			Not yet introduced																					X	X	X	X	X	X	X	X	8
Events			2	2	3	3	3	2	2	2	2	2	2	2	2	2	2	2	2	2	2	2	2	4	4	4	4	4	4	4	4	

=== Women's ===
Event	96	00	04	08	12	20	24	28	32	36	48	52	56	60	64	68	72	76	80	84	88	92	96	00	04	08	12	16	20	24	28	Games
3 metre springboard			Not yet introduced			X	X	X	X	X	X	X	X	X	X	X	X	X	X	X	X	X	X	X	X	X	X	X	X	X	X	26
10 metre platform			–	–	X	X	X	X	X	X	X	X	X	X	X	X	X	X	X	X	X	X	X	X	X	X	X	X	X	X	X	27
Synchronized 3 metre springboard			Not yet introduced																					X	X	X	X	X	X	X	X	8
Synchronized 10 metre platform			Not yet introduced																					X	X	X	X	X	X	X	X	8
Events			–	–	1	2	2	2	2	2	2	2	2	2	2	2	2	2	2	2	2	2	2	4	4	4	4	4	4	4	4	

== Nations ==
The numbers in each cell indicate the number of divers that nation sent to that Games.

Nation	96	00	04	08	12	20	24	28	32	36	48	52	56	60	64	68	72	76	80	84	88	92	96	00	04	08	12	16	20	24	28	Years
Argentina														1						1	1	2		1								5
Armenia																							2	1								2
Australasia				1																												1
Australia						1	1	1		1	1	2	10	4	2	2	3	4	3	4	5	7	7	6	7	9	10	9	7	9		24
Austria					1		3	2	2	3	4	4	1	2	4	1	4	2	3	1	2	2	2	3	2	3		1		1		23
Azerbaijan																							1	1								2
Bahamas																					1											1
Barbados																					1											1
Belarus																							5	2	3	4	2	2				6
Belgium				1		3	2													1	1	1										6
Bermuda											1	2													1							3
Bolivia																							1									1
Brazil						1					3	2	2	1				1	1	1	1	1		2	4	4	3	9	4	2		17
Bulgaria																			2			1	1									3
Canada				1	2	1		1	3	3	2		2	2	3	4	8	9		7	6	8	6	7	6	10	9	6	10	5		23
Chile											1		2																			2
China																				8	8	8	7	8	10	10	12	13	16	10		11
Chinese Taipei																							2	4								2
Colombia														1	1	3	2							2	1	3	2	4	3	3		11
Costa Rica																							1									1
Croatia																												1				1
Cuba											1					2			2					6	6	5	3			2		8
Czech Republic																								1								1
Czechoslovakia							2	2		3				1		1	1	1	2													8
Denmark						5	4	1	1	2	3	2	1	2	2				1													11
Dominican Republic																1			2	3									1	3		5
East Germany																5	7	7	9		4											6
Ecuador																		1			1											2
Egypt								2		4	4	4		3	1					4								4	3	4		10
Finland				2	6	3	6	2		1	1	3	1	1	1	2	2			1	1			2	2	1						18
France						1	12	4	1	2	5	4	2	4			3	2	1	1	2	2	1	6	1	2	5	3	3	9		23
Georgia																							2	1								2
Germany			3	5	4			9	2	11		4										6	7	8	10	14	8	8	9	9		16
Great Britain				16	3	5	11	7		6	11	9	5	7	6	5	8	4	6	6	5	4	5	8	7	10	12	11	12	11		26
Greece																						1	1	5	8	1	1					6
Guatemala																1																1
Hong Kong																				2	2		1	1								4
Hungary										2	1		2	2	2				2		3	3	2	4	3	2	2	1				16
India															2																	1
Indonesia																	1							3								2
Iran															1																	1
Ireland											1																	1	2	2		4
Israel												1	1																			2
Italy				1	1	1	1	3		3		1		5	3	4	2	4	1	2	4	3	2	5	6	8	8	8	6	8		24
Jamaica																	1											1	1	1		4
Japan						1		1	4	5		2	4	5	9	4	3	3		3	4	3	3	1	2	2	1	3	11	5		21
Kazakhstan																							5	5								2
Kuwait																		2	1	2	1		2									5
Latvia																														1		1
Malaysia																								3	3	4	9	6	5	2		7
Mexico								1	5	1	4	5	3	4	3	6	4	5	6	6	3	8	5	7	5	7	10	9	14	9		23
Netherlands							4	7		1	2	2		2		2	2			1	2	2						1	2	1		14
New Zealand																		1		3		1						1	1			6
North Korea																						4	3	5	3	3	3	2		3		8
Norway					3	4				3	2					1	1			2	1	1					1		1	1		11
Peru										1														1								2
Philippines																								2		2						2
Poland														1		5	3		2		1	1								1		7
Portugal																				1												1
Puerto Rico															1	2	1						2	1	1			1	1	1		9
Rhodesia														1	3																	2
Romania																	3		3			4	3	3	1	2						7
Russia																							7	7	9	10	7	8				6
Russian Empire					1																											1
Singapore																													2			1
South Africa											1	1										1			1	1		1	2	1		8
South Korea														1	3	2				1	2		4	4		1	2	1	5	6		12
Soviet Union												11	11	7	12	10	9	11	12		8											9
Spain							3										2	3	3	2	2	3	5	5	4	2	2		2	4		14
Sri Lanka												1											1									2
Sweden				10	34	12	11	8	1	3	3	4	2	4	2	1	2	3	2	2	2	1	3	1	1	2	2		1	1		26
Switzerland						1	1	1		3	2	2		1			1				1	2	1	3	1				1			14
Syria											1									1												2
Tajikistan																							2									1
Thailand																		1					2	2								3
Turkey																		1														1
Ukraine																							6	9	8	9	9	7	6	9		8
Unified Team																						7										1
United States			7	2	2	14	10	9	9	10	7	11	9	5	12	11	8	11		7	7	7	8	7	10	12	11	10	11	11		30
United Team of Germany														7	9																	2
Uzbekistan																														1		1
Uruguay																							1									1
Venezuela												1						1		1		1	1	3	1	1	3	2	1			11
West Germany																8	9	4		4	6											6
Yugoslavia										1													2									2
Zimbabwe																			3	2	1	2	1	1								6
Nations			2	9	10	14	14	18	9	21	21	21	16	24	21	23	25	22	21	29	31	30	40	42	30	29	25	28	30	32		82
Divers			10	39	57	53	71	61	28	69	62	72	59	74	82	83	90	82	67	80	81	95	121	157	125	136	136	135	144	136		
Year	96	00	04	08	12	20	24	28	32	36	48	52	56	60	64	68	72	76	80	84	88	92	96	00	04	08	12	16	20	24	28	

== See also ==
- List of Olympic venues in diving
