= Puunene School =

- U.S. National Register of Historic Places
- Hawaiʻi Register of Historic Places
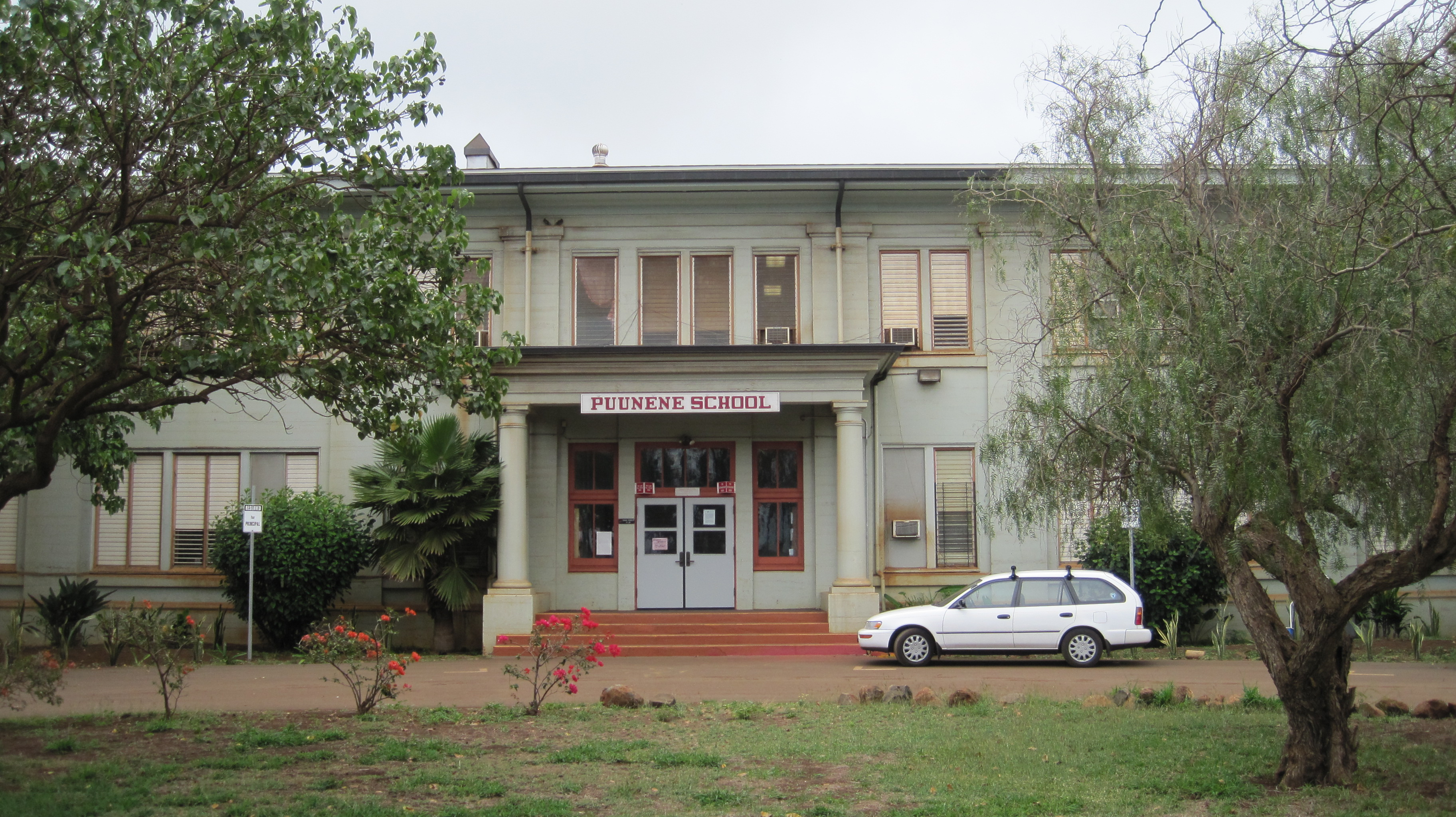
- Puʻunēnē School front entrance

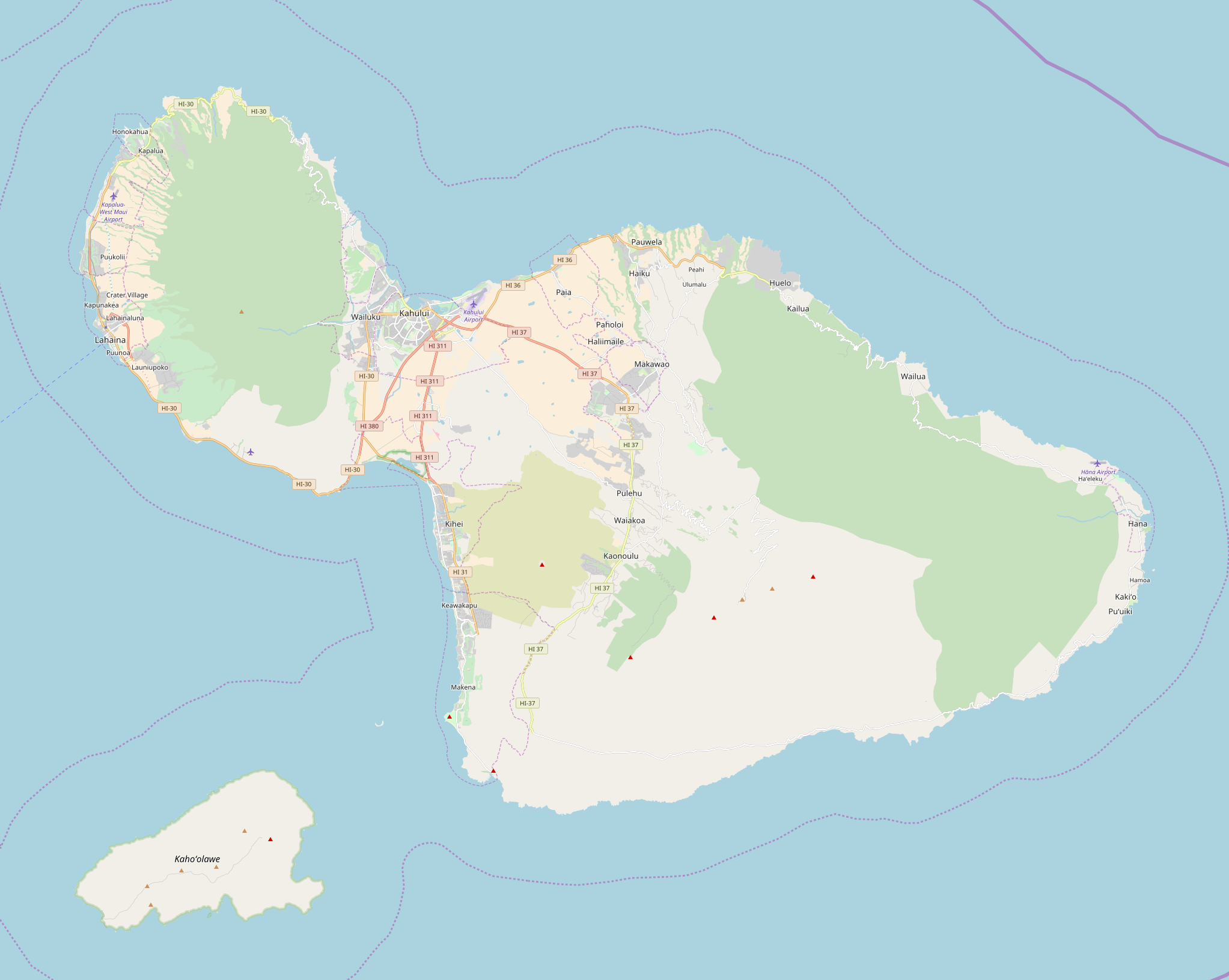
- Location within Maui Location within Hawaii
- Coordinates: 20°51′41″N 156°26′57″W
- Area: 10.9 acres (4.4 ha)
- Built: 1922
- Architectural style: Classical Revival
- MPS: Maui Public Schools MPS
- NRHP reference No.: 00000663
- HRHP No.: 50-50-04-01630

Significant dates
- Added to NRHP: August 22, 2000
- Designated HRHP: June 2, 1992

The Puʻunēnē School, also known as Puunene School, is a historic school building in the community of Puʻunēnē in the central part of Maui, Hawaii, United States. Built in 1922 by the Hawaiian Commercial and Sugar Company (a division of Alexander & Baldwin), which ran the community, it was erected on 10 acres (4.0 ha) of land donated by the company in 1913. Upon completion, it replaced an earlier four-room school on the site that was built to hold 350 students. The Classical Revival 1922 two-story concrete building became Maui's largest elementary school with about 1000 students. In the 1950s the area went into decline, and the building was used for special education classes. In 1979 it became an administrative annex for the Department of Education. It was added to the National Register of Historic Places listings in Hawaii on August 22, 2000.

In 1937 Puunene School science teacher Soichi Sakamoto began training boys in a Three Year Swim Club to compete in the 1940 Summer Olympics, which were originally scheduled to be held in Tokyo, Japan. Jose Balmores, Keo Nakama, "Bunny" Nakama, "Halo" Hirose, and Bill Smith swam 50-yd sprints against the 15 mph current (much clearer in those days) and went on to compete nationally but were never able to participate in the canceled 1940 and 1944 Olympics. However, Smith was finally able to win gold on the 400- and 800-meter relay team in the 1948 Olympics. The coach and team were described in a 2015 book.

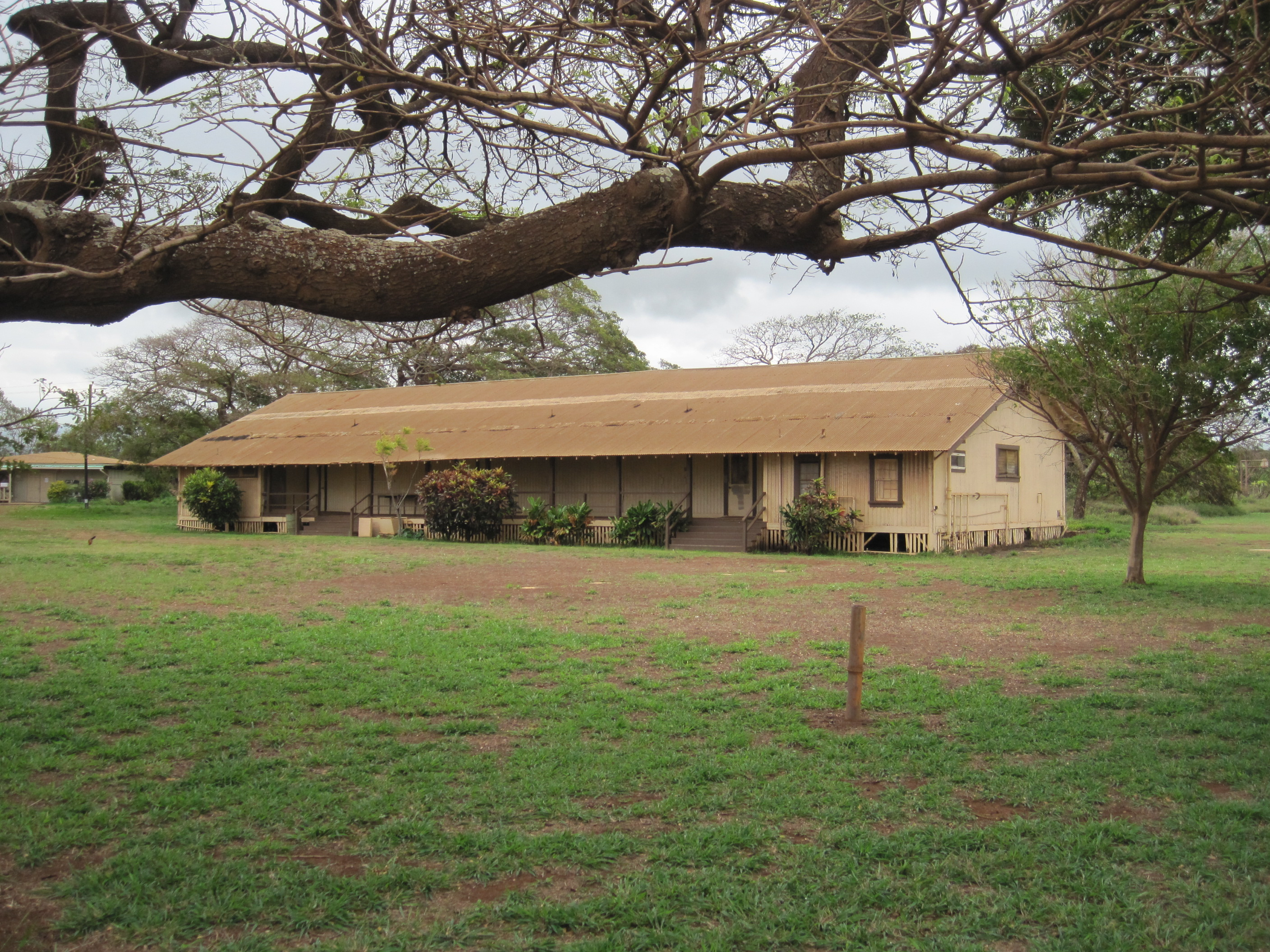
Older, plantation-style wooden school building

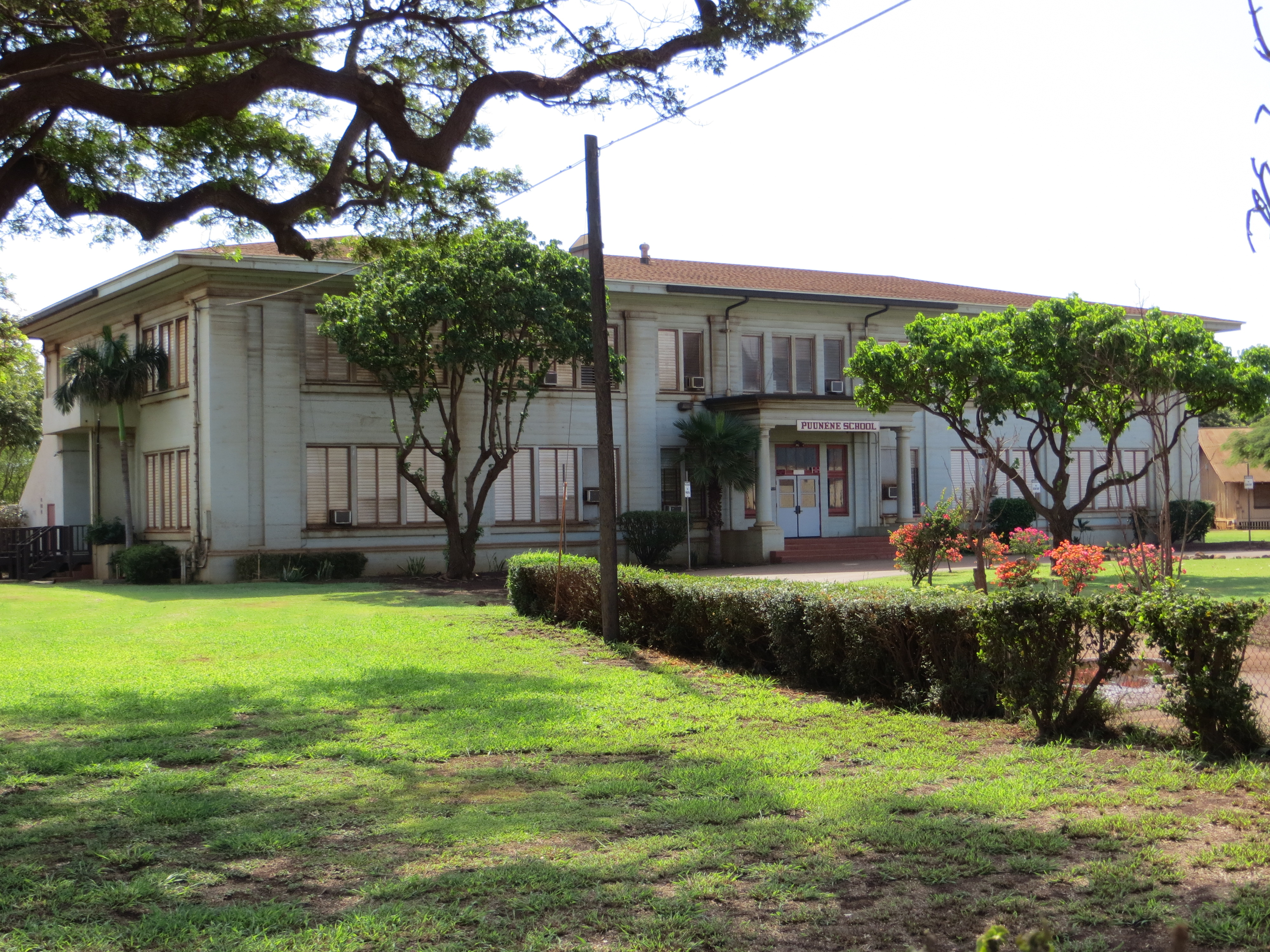
Newer concrete school built in 1922

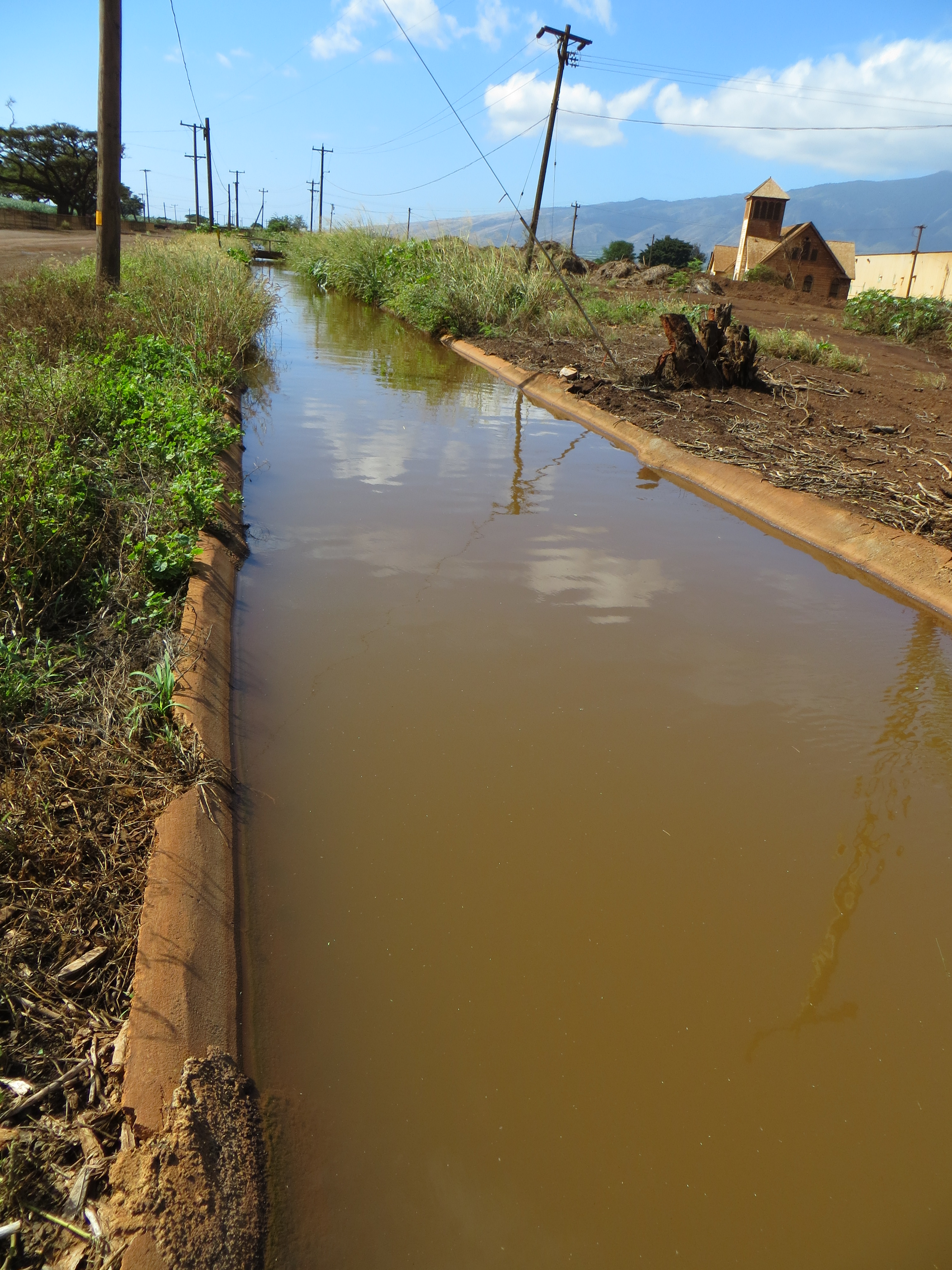
Irrigation ditch where the Three-Year Swim Club practiced
