= 1943 NCAA swimming and diving championships =

American college aquatic sports competition

- Host city: Columbus, Ohio
- Date(s): March 1943
- Venue(s): Ohio State Natatorium; Ohio State University
- Teams: 15
- Events: 11

The 1943 NCAA swimming and diving championships were contested in March 1943 at the Ohio State Natatorium at Ohio State University in Columbus, Ohio as the seventh annual NCAA-sanctioned swim meet to determine the team and individual national champions of men's collegiate swimming and diving among its member programs in the United States.

Hosts Ohio State topped the team standings, the Buckeyes' first title in program history. Ohio State had finished in second or third place in each of the previous six championships.

== Team standings ==
- (H) = Hosts
- (DC) = Defending champions
- Italics = Debut appearance

Rank	Team	Points
1st place, gold medalist(s)	Ohio State (H)	81
2nd place, silver medalist(s)	Michigan	47
3rd place, bronze medalist(s)	Minnesota	13
4	Iowa	10
5	Pacific	8
6	Columbia	6
6	Northwestern	6
6	Princeton	6
6	Stanford	6
10	Texas A&M	5
10	Washington	5
12	Michigan State	4
13	Purdue	2
14	California	1
14	Penn State	1

- DNQ: Yale (DC)

== Individual events ==
=== Swimming ===
Event	Champion	Team	Time
50-yard freestyle	Henry Kozlowski	Northwestern	22.1
100-yard freestyle	John Patten	Michigan	52.0
220-yard freestyle	Bill Smith	Ohio State	2:09.8
440-yard freestyle	Keo Nakama	Ohio State	4:43.2
1,500-meter freestyle	Keo Nakama	Ohio State	19:18.6
150-yard backstroke	Harry Holiday	Michigan	1:33.5
200-yard butterfly	Emmett Cashin	Stanford	2:27.4
400-yard freestyle relay	Harry Holiday; John Patten; Merton Church; Ace Cory	Michigan (DC)	3:31.1
300-yard medley relay	Harry Holiday; Irving Einbinder; John Patten	Michigan	2:53.4

=== Diving ===
Event	Champion	Team	Score
One-meter diving	Frank Dempsey (DC)	Ohio State	141.12
Three-meter diving	Frank Dempsey (DC)	Ohio State	155.68

== See also ==
- List of college swimming and diving teams
