= Harry Huffaker =

American marathon swimmer and dentist (1939–2026)

Personal information
- Full name: Harry Withers Huffaker
- Born: December 27, 1939 Long Island, New York, U.S.
- Died: January 29, 2026 (aged 86) Hailey, Idaho, U.S.
- Education: University of Michigan
- Occupation: Dentist

Sport
- Sport: Swimming
- Strokes: Freestyle
- Club: Outrigger Canoe Club
- College team: Michigan Wolverines

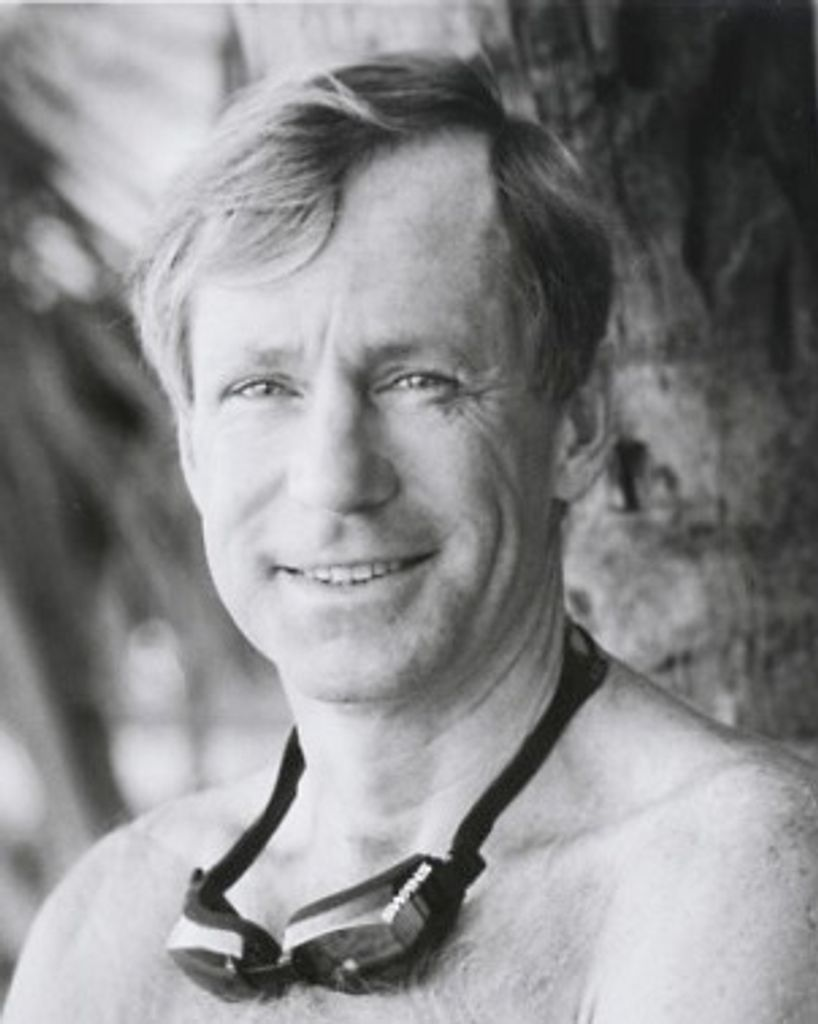
Harry Huffaker in 1989 at age 50, the year he swam four major channels in a single year

Harry Withers Huffaker (December 27, 1939 – January 29, 2026) was an American marathon swimmer and dentist who pioneered open water crossings of the channels between the Hawaiian Islands. An All-American at the University of Michigan, he made repeated unsuccessful attempts on the English Channel in the 1960s before moving to Honolulu, where he practiced dentistry for some three decades and became the first person to swim several Hawaiian channels, including the ʻAlenuihāhā Channel in 1970 and the Kalohi Channel in 1989.

Huffaker was inducted into the Hawaii Swimming Hall of Fame in 2002 and the International Marathon Swimming Hall of Fame as an Honor Swimmer in 2011. He lived aboard a sailboat in Honolulu for several years and later retired to Ketchum, Idaho.

== Early life and education ==
Huffaker was born on December 27, 1939, in Long Island, New York, the second son of Melvin Simpson Huffaker, a lawyer, and Dorothy Perkins Huffaker. The family moved to Grosse Pointe, Michigan, where his father practiced law.

He nearly drowned at the age of eight while trying out for a swim team, but continued in the sport and became a competitive swimmer at Grosse Pointe High School. As a senior in 1957 he won the Michigan state championship in the 150-yard individual medley.

Huffaker enrolled at the University of Michigan, where he swam for the Wolverines and earned All-American honors, graduating in 1961. He was a teammate of Jon Urbanchek on two NCAA Championship teams. He remained at Michigan for dental school, receiving his degree in 1966.

== English Channel attempts ==
While a student, Huffaker traveled to Europe to attempt the English Channel. On September 14, 1963, he set out from Cap Gris-Nez in the France-to-England direction alongside the Pakistani swimmer Abdul Malek, and abandoned the swim after about eight hours and twenty minutes, some six miles from the English coast. Peter Frayne, an official of the Channel Swimming Association who observed the attempt, wrote that Huffaker had shown "quiet confidence" and that "it was a valiant swim. It could not be called a failure."

He returned in August 1964 and again started from the French coast, blacking out after roughly eight and a half hours and being pulled from the water. Accounts of his career describe three attempts on the Channel between 1963 and 1966, two of which ended in hypothermia-induced unconsciousness. He never completed a crossing.

== Hawaii ==
=== Dentistry ===
Huffaker moved to Hawaii in late 1966, initially to satisfy a residency requirement for dental licensure, and stayed. He practiced dentistry on Oahu for about thirty years, retiring in the early 1990s. He joined the Outrigger Canoe Club, whose members escorted and paddled alongside him on his channel swims.

=== Channel swims ===
In September 1967, Huffaker became the second person, after Keo Nakama, to swim the Kaiwi Channel (Molokaʻi Channel) from Molokaʻi to Oahu, finishing in 13 hours 35 minutes. During the crossing a large shark passed between him and his escort boat.

In April 1970 he made the first crossing of the ʻAlenuihāhā Channel, the roughly 30-mile (48 km) passage between the island of Hawaiʻi and Maui, in 20 hours 8 minutes; an earlier attempt months before had been turned back by currents after some 17 hours. The crossing was not repeated for nearly four decades.

In September 1972 Huffaker swam the Kaiwi Channel in the reverse direction, from Oahu to Molokaʻi, in 16 hours 15 minutes — the first crossing in that direction. He was stung by Portuguese man o' war, which swelled his throat and temporarily paralyzed his legs, and encountered a tiger shark within about a mile of the finish.

In 1977 he became the first person to swim the ʻAuʻau Channel (the Maui Channel) solo, from Lānaʻi to Maui.

=== 1989 three-island swim ===
In 1989, at the age of 50, Huffaker attempted a continuous crossing of three channels linking Lānaʻi, Maui and Molokaʻi — a roughly 39-mile (63 km) route through the waters of Maui Nui that had never been swum. He completed the ʻAuʻau Channel from Lānaʻi to Maui and the Pailolo Channel from Maui to Molokaʻi, and became the first person to swim the Kalohi Channel from Molokaʻi to Lānaʻi, but the final leg was called off after about 31 hours and 35 miles because of shallow water and small-craft and high-surf warnings near Shipwreck Beach. The attempt was a fundraiser for the Hawaii Rotary Youth Foundation; against an initial goal of $50,000, it raised about $225,000 for college scholarships.

Huffaker later helped plan the Maui Nui Triangle route, which the American swimmer Becca Mann completed in 2019.

=== Maui Channel Swim ===
Huffaker was a longtime figure in the Maui Channel Swim, the 9.5-mile relay race across the ʻAuʻau Channel from Lānaʻi to Kāʻanapali on Maui, which was founded in 1972 by Jim Cotton and first contested between the Waikīkī Swim Club and the Olympic Club of San Francisco. When the Outrigger Canoe Club entered its own team in 1974, Huffaker was its captain, and he swam on Outrigger teams through 1977.

== Other sports ==
Huffaker ran 18 marathons, including the Boston Marathon. He was also a sailor: he bought a 40-foot sailboat, made inter-island voyages, and lived aboard for six years while continuing his dental practice. He climbed Mount Kilimanjaro and skied, and remained an active motorcyclist and angler in later life.

== Later life and death ==
After retiring from dentistry in the early 1990s, Huffaker moved to Ketchum, Idaho, retaining nonresident membership of the Outrigger Canoe Club and his ties to the Hawaii swimming community. He died of natural causes at his home in Hailey, Idaho, on January 29, 2026, at the age of 86.

Steve Munatones of the World Open Water Swimming Association said of him, "Dr. Huffaker is an example of all that is admirable and unique in the sport of swimming."

== Honors ==
- Honolulu Quarterback Club Senior Male Athlete of the Year, 1990
- Hawaii Swimming Hall of Fame, 2002 (Open Water and Channel category)
- International Marathon Swimming Hall of Fame, Honor Swimmer, 2011
