= Keo Nakama =

American swimmer (1920–2011)

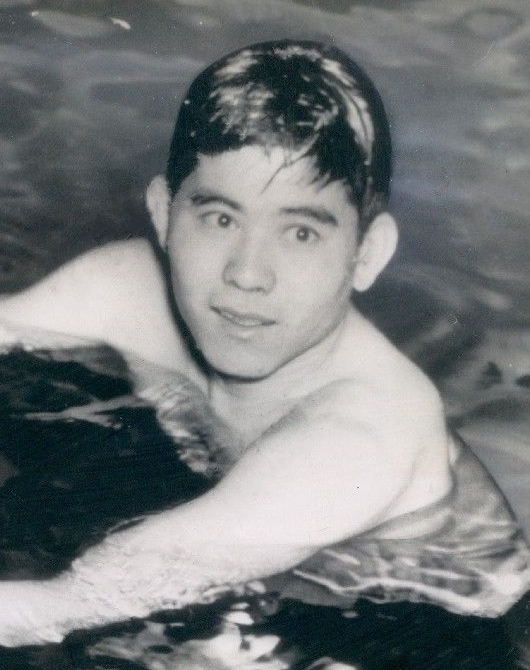
- Nakama in 1942

Personal information
- Full name: Kiyoshi K. Nakama
- National team: United States
- Born: May 21, 1920 Puʻunene, Hawaii
- Died: September 8, 2011 (aged 91) Honolulu, Hawaii, U.S.
- Height: 167.64 cm (5 ft 6 in)

Sport
- Sport: Swimming
- Club: Three-year Swim Club; Hawaii Swim Club
- College team: Ohio State University
- Coach: Soichi Sakamoto ("Three Year SC"); Mike Peppe (OSU)
Medal record
Men's swimming
NCAA
Gold medal – first place	Columbus 1943	440-yard freestyle
Gold medal – first place	Columbus 1943	1,500-meter freestyle
Gold medal – first place	New Haven 1944	440-yard freestyle
Gold medal – first place	New Haven 1944	1,500-meter freestyle

Kiyoshi Nakama (Japanese: 仲間 清, May 21, 1920 – September 8, 2011) was an American freestyle competitive swimmer, who set a world record in the mile, was an All American at Ohio State, and later served as a High School swim coach, teacher and ten-year member of the Hawaii State House of Representatives.

== Early education and swimming ==
Nakama was born in Puʻunene, Hawaii, a town on the island of Maui known for its nearby Sugar Cane plantations.

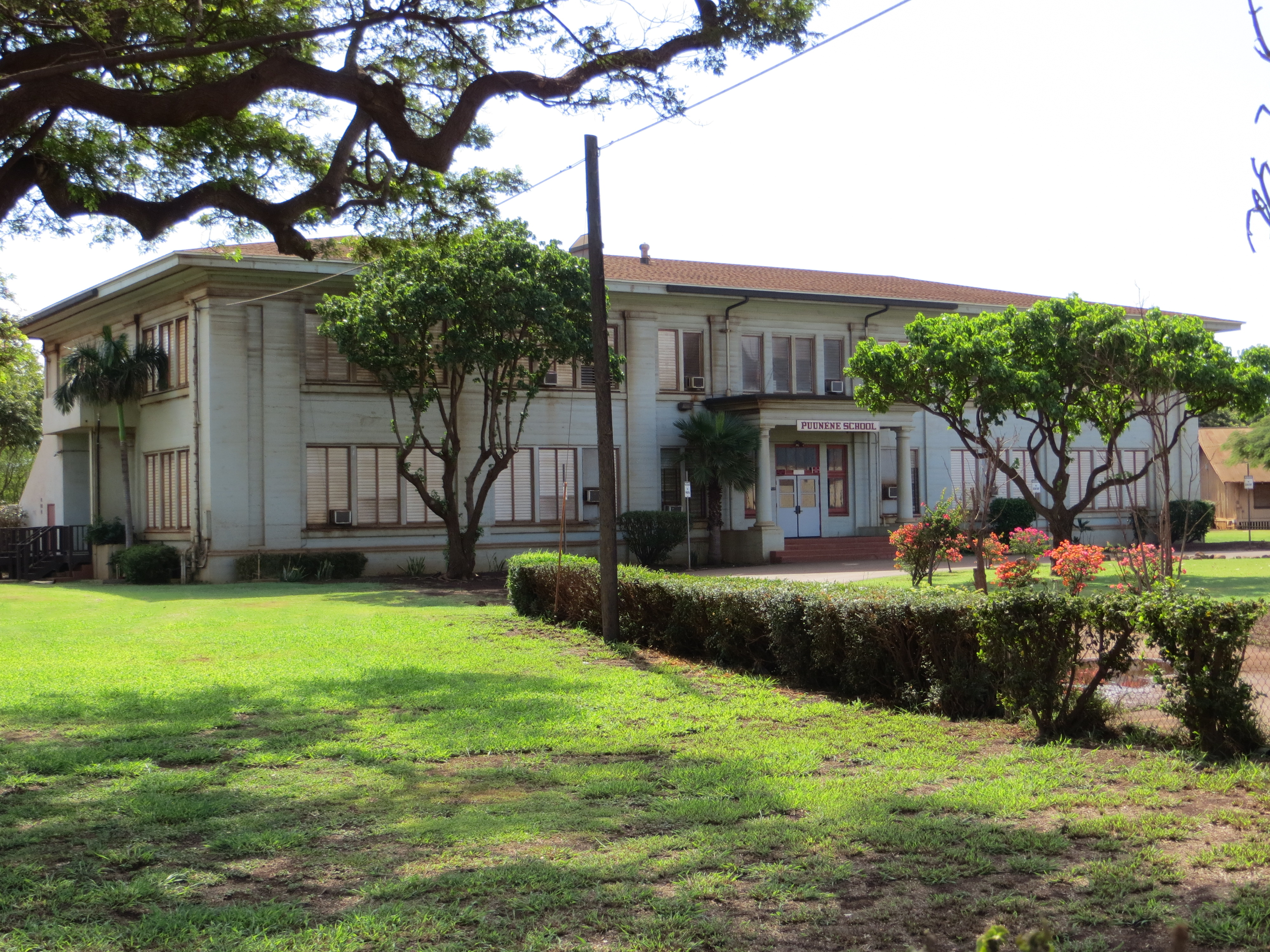
Puunene School

He attended Maui High School, and was a high achieving member of the strict and competitive "Three-year Swim Club" managed by Hall of Fame swim Coach Soichi Sakamoto at the Puʻunene School. To improve his baseball skills, he played with Puunene's Camp leagues during his High School years as Maui High had no baseball team

== Ohio State ==
At Ohio State, where he swam for legendary Head Coach Mike Peppe, he was an All-American in distance freestyle events, and captured six Big Ten, four NCAA, three NAAU indoor and six NAAU outdoor titles. Nakama played a vital role contributing to Ohio State's National Championship swim teams in 1943 and 1945. He was also a star third baseman for the Ohio State baseball team that won the 1943 Big Ten Championship, and was the first Ohio State Athlete to simultaneously serve as Captain in two different sports. He completed his Masters at Ohio State in 1945, and taught for the University for two years.

=== World record ===
His swimming career was highlighted by a world record 20:29 in the mile swim, and he had numerous national and international victories. The outbreak of World War II prevented his competing in the 1940 and 1944 Olympic Games, as he was at his peak from 1940 to 1944.

== International swimming career ==
His greatest single championship performance were his five gold medals in the 1940 Pan American Swimming Championships. Domestically he held a total of twenty-seven USA national swimming titles for freestyle distances ranging 110 yards to 1500 meters, and he won six Australian National Championships.

== Molokai channel swim ==
Malokai (Kaiwi) Channel, near top center, at (3)

He may be best known for becoming the first person to swim the Molokai Channel also known as the Kaiwi Channel, a route from the island of Molokai to Oahu in Hawaii, shown as (3) in the diagram at left. The swim was a considerable challenge for a 41-year old athlete, and his achievement was a verifiable first in distance swimming. In September 1961, he crossed the dangerous 27-mile Channel, also known as Kai Iwi, in 15 ½ hours. Challenged by muscle cramps and fatigue, and suffering from the stings from Portuguese Men of War, he finished in Hanauma Bay at night in front of thousands of admiring spectators.

== Post-swimming career ==
After retiring from competitive swimming, and completing his education including two years teaching at Ohio State, he worked as a High School teacher, athletic director and occasional swim coach, at Farrington and Leilehua High Schools, and Washington and Jarrett Intermediate Schools. Nakama was later elected to the Hawaii State House of Representatives, where he served for five two-year terms from 1964 until 1974.

He died in at St. Francis Hospice West in Honolulu on September 8, 2011 at the age of 91, with evening services on September 30 at Diamond Head Mortuary. He was pre-deceased by his wife Evelyn Mitsue Oyadomari Nakama, a former Philippine Airline supervisor who died in 2008. The couple had six children, mostly girls. In a unique tribute to the greatly admired public servant and athlete, Hawaii's Governor Neil Abercrombie ordered flags to be flown at half staff from sunrise to sunset on Friday, September 30, 2011, the day of his memorial.

== Honors ==
He was inducted into the International Swimming Hall of Fame in 1975, and the Ohio State Athletic Hall of Fame in 1979. Well known for his Molokai Channel swim, he was inducted in the International Marathon Swimming Hall of Fame in 1967.

== See also ==
- List of members of the International Swimming Hall of Fame
