= Kitty O'Neil =

American stuntwoman and racer (1946–2018)

- O'Neil and the SMI Motivator, Oregon 1976
- Born: Kitty Linn O'Neil; March 24, 1946; Corpus Christi, Texas, U.S.
- Died: November 2, 2018 (aged 72); Eureka, South Dakota, U.S.
- Occupations: Stuntwoman; race car driver

Kitty Linn O'Neil (March 24, 1946 – November 2, 2018) was an American stuntwoman and auto-racer, often called "the fastest woman in the world" for her various speed records. Her women's absolute land speed record stood until 2019.

An illness in early childhood left her deaf, and more illnesses in early adulthood cut short a career in competitive diving. O'Neil subsequently moved into car racing and became a pioneering woman in the stunt industry in Hollywood. She appeared in numerous television and film projects, lent her likeness to an action figure, was honored at the 91st Academy Awards, and in March 2023 with a Doodle in the Google search.

== Early life ==
Kitty Linn O'Neil was born in Corpus Christi, Texas on March 24, 1946. Her father, was an officer in the United States Army Air Forces, who had been an oil wildcatter. He died in an airplane crash during Kitty's childhood. Her mother is of Cherokee descent. At five months of age, O'Neil contracted simultaneous childhood diseases, (Note: The list of diseases varies according to the source, many mentioning measles and smallpox, others listing measles, mumps and chicken pox. In a 1979 interview with the Washington Post, O'Neil mentions measles and smallpox. Although not impossible, smallpox was a highly unlikely disease in 1940s Texas. Smallpox was extremely rare by then, but not quite eradicated. The last endemic case of smallpox in the United States was in 1949, in the Rio Grande valley of Texas. The 1977 People article mentions chicken pox, a much more likely childhood disease. Deafness is one possible outcome of both measles and mumps.) losing her hearing. After her deafness became apparent at the age of two, her mother taught her lip-reading and speech, eventually becoming a speech therapist and co-founding a school for students with hearing impairment in Wichita Falls, Texas.

As a teenager, O'Neil became a competitive 10-meter platform diver and 3-meter springboard diver, winning Amateur Athletic Union diving championships. She trained beginning in 1962 with diving coach Sammy Lee. Before the trials for the 1964 Olympics, she broke her wrist and contracted spinal meningitis, threatening her ability to walk and ending her contention for a position on the Olympic diving team. She competed in 100m backstroke and 100m freestyle swimming at the 1965 Summer Deaflympics. After recovering from meningitis, she lost interest in diving, and turned to water skiing, scuba diving, skydiving and hang gliding, stating that diving "wasn't scary enough for me". In her late 20s, she underwent two treatments for cancer.

== Racing and stunt career ==
By 1970, O'Neil had taken up racing on water and land, participating in the Baja 500 and Mint 400. She met stuntmen Hal Needham and Ron Hambleton while racing motorcycles, and lived with Hambleton, (Note: News articles from the time reported that she was Hambleton's wife, which was not the case) giving up racing for a time. In the mid-1970s, she entered stunt work, training with Needham, Hambleton and Dar Robinson. In 1976, she was one of two stuntwomen, Janet Brady being the other to join Stunts Unlimited, the leading stunt group. As a stuntwoman, she appeared in The Bionic Woman, Airport '77, The Blues Brothers, Smokey and the Bandit II and other television and film productions. In 1978, her stunt career inspired a Kitty O'Neil action figure, made by Mattel.

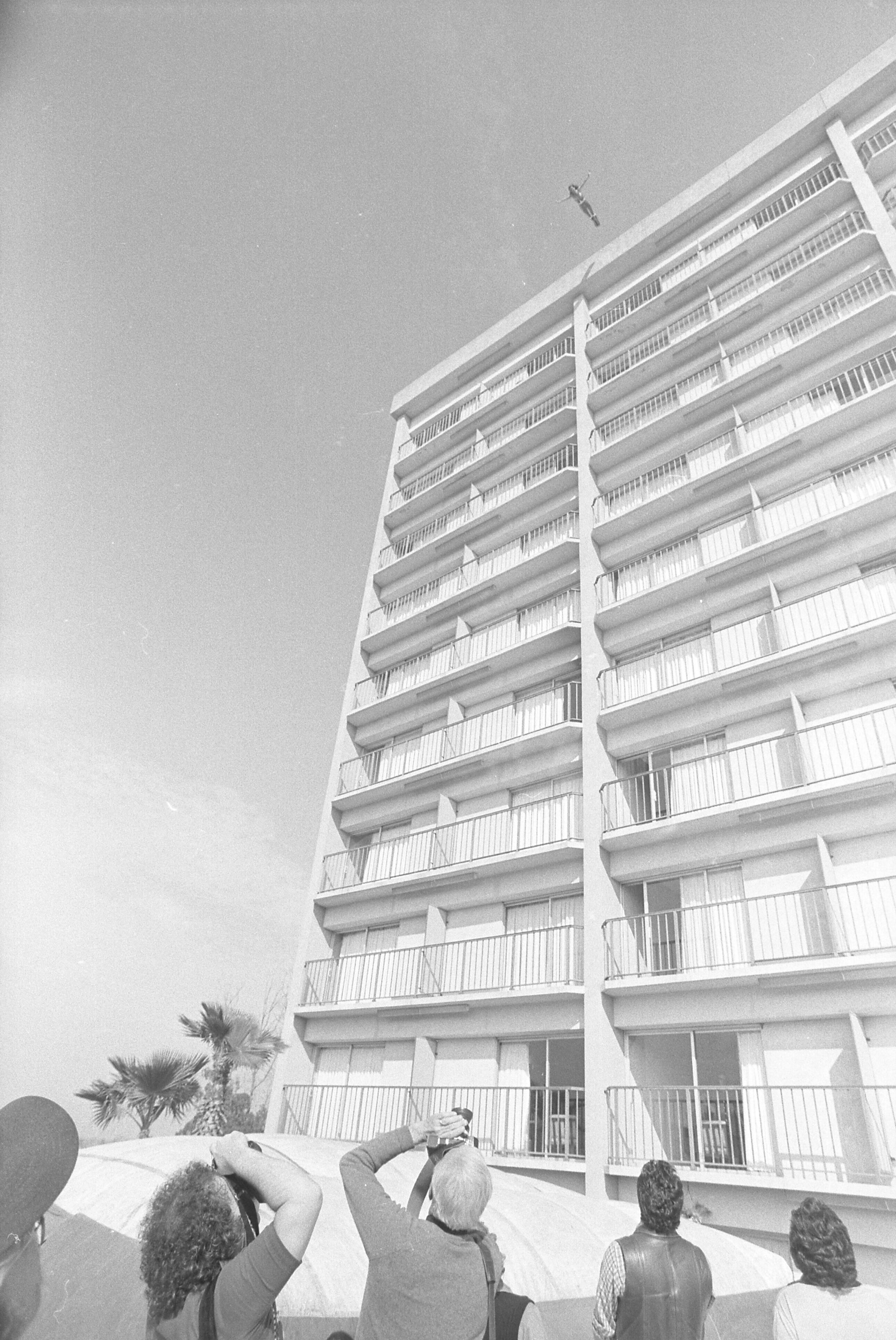
O'Neil performing her stunt off the Valley Hilton in 1979.

In filming for a 1979 episode of Wonder Woman, O'Neil was hired to perform a stunt of high difficulty for Jeannie Epper, Lynda Carter's usual stunt double. In the process, she set a women's high-fall record of 127 feet (39 m) at the 12-storey Valley Hilton in Sherman Oaks, California. She credited her small size, at 5'-2" and 97 pounds (44 kg), for allowing her to withstand impact forces. She later broke her record with a 180-foot (55 m) fall from a helicopter. In 1977, O'Neil set a women's record for speed on water of 275 miles per hour (443 km/h), and she held a 1970 women's water skiing record of 104.85 miles per hour (168.74 km/h).

== Land speed record ==
On 6 December 1976, in southeastern Oregon's Alvord Desert, O'Neil set the land-speed record for female drivers. She piloted a $350,000 (equivalent to $2.0 million in 2025) hydrogen peroxide powered three-wheeled rocket car built by Bill Fredrick called the "SMI Motivator". It reached an average speed of 512.710 mph (825.127 km/h), with a peak speed of 621 miles per hour (999 km/h).

O'Neil's runs reportedly used 60% of the available thrust, and O'Neil estimated that she could have exceeded 700 miles per hour (1,100 km/h) with full power.

=== Attempt prevented by sponsors ===
Restrained by her contract, O'Neil struggled with sponsors at the time. She was contracted to break only the women's land speed record, and was obligated to allow Hal Needham to set the overall record. According to her contract, she was not supposed to exceed 400 miles per hour (640 km/h). Needham's sponsor, toy company Marvin Glass and Associates, was preparing a Hal Needham action figure and obtained an injunction to stop further runs by O'Neil. A spokesman was reported (incorrectly according to Sports Illustrated) to say it is "unbecoming and degrading for a woman to set a land speed record." Needham did not set a record or even drive the car, and a legal effort by O'Neil and Hambleton to allow O'Neil another attempt failed. The sponsors received negative publicity for removing O'Neil from the car, and the Needham action figures were not marketed.

== Later years and death ==
In 1977 in the Mojave Desert, O'Neil piloted a hydrogen peroxide-powered rocket dragster built by Ky Michaelson with an average speed of 279.5 mph (449.8 km/h). Since the run was not repeated according to NHRA rules, it is not recognized as an official drag racing record.

In 1979, O'Neil's experiences served as the basis for a biographical film, Silent Victory: The Kitty O'Neil Story, starring Stockard Channing. O'Neil commented that about half of the film was an accurate depiction.

O'Neil stepped away from stunt and speed work in 1982 after stunt colleagues were killed while performing. She moved to Minneapolis with Michaelson, and eventually moved to Eureka, South Dakota, with Raymond Wald. When she retired, O'Neil had set 22 speed records on land and water.

O'Neil died on November 2, 2018, of pneumonia in Eureka, South Dakota, at age 72. In 2019, she was featured in the Oscars' In Memoriam segment.

== Tribute ==
On March 24, 2023, Google celebrated O'Neil's posthumous 77th birthday with a doodle.
