= Bob Sohl =

American swimmer (1928–2001)

- Sohl at the University of Michigan in 1949

Personal information
- Full name: Robert Raymond Sohl
- Nickname: "Bob"
- National team: United States
- Born: March 28, 1928 York, Pennsylvania, U.S.
- Died: April 8, 2001 (aged 73) Highland Beach, Florida, U.S.
- Occupations: Regional Sales Manager; Standard Register, Xerox
- Spouse: Dorothy Frances Williams
- Children: 3

Sport
- Sport: Swimming
- Strokes: Breaststroke
- Club: York YMCA
- College team: University of Michigan
- Coach: John deBarbadillo (York YMCA); Matt Mann (U. Michigan)
Medal record
Men's swimming
Representing the United States
Olympic Games
Bronze medal – third place	1948 London	200 m breaststroke
Representing Michigan
NCAA
Gold medal – first place	1947 Seattle	300-yard medley relay
Gold medal – first place	1948 Ann Arbor	300-yard medley relay

Robert Raymond Sohl (March 28, 1928 – April 8, 2001) was an American competition swimmer, a breaststroke world record holder and a 1948 Olympic bronze medalist in the 200-meter breaststroke. After graduating and swimming for the University of Michigan in 1949, Sohl attended Officer Candidate School in Fort Sill, Oklahoma, and served in the Army Field Artillery as a Lieutenant through 1953. In the 1950s, Sohl worked in Sales Management for Standard Register in New York, and after 1964 in Sales Management and as a Director of Training for Xerox Corporation in Virginia, later retiring as a vice-president.

== Early life and swimming ==
Sohl was born in York, Pennsylvania on March 28, 1928. He was raised by Dr. and Mrs. H. D. Baird, and learned to swim at the local YMCA under "Y" Coach John deBarbadillo. deBarbadillo was a recipient of the Joseph G. Rogers award presented by the National YMCA for his contributions to the sport of swimming. DeBarbadillo coached a few national champions, greatly contributed to the concept of age-group swimming, and after officially leaving the YMCA staff in 1974, coached with the YWCA Blue Dolphin Age Group Club from 1986-November 2000. In the 1930s deBarbadillo's York YMCA Neptune Club was a strong and recognized swimming team. In September 2001, the YMCA in York was renamed in deBarbadillo's honor.

== High school era swimming ==
Sohl attended York's Hannah Penn Junior High and York High School, later known as William Penn Senior High School. Recognized as an honor student at York, Sohl competed in gymnastics at the York YMCA in his early years, and did strength training to gain speed, and coordination. In May 1940, Sohl received the C.C. Bleeker award presented to a YMCA gymnast who had made the most progress during their first year of competition. Clarence C. Bleecker, a YMCA Physical Director, may have also served as one of Sohl's swim coaches at the York YMCA. Sohl's YMCA swim coach John deBarbadillo had been a former gymnastics competitor and likely worked with Sohl in gymnastics and strength training. deBarbadillo was also reputed to be a skilled teacher of swim stroke technique. One of Sohl's primary coaches at William Penn High School during the years he represented them in swimming was Charles Boeckel. deBardillo was an acquaintance of Michigan's Coach Mat Mann, he may have encouraged Sohl to attend the school, or acted as a reference. Sohl began swimming and competing with deBarbadillo's York YMCA team around the age of 11 or 12 in 1940. In March 1942, swimming for York High School, the winner of eight consecutive Pennsylvania Interscholastic Athletic Association District 3 Regional titles, Sohl placed third in the 100-yard breaststroke.

In 1943, Sohl and his family moved to Montreal, Wisconsin, where around the age of 14, he attended nearby Hurley High School, where he won a Wisconsin state title in Milwaukee, taking a second place in the 100-yard breaststroke and winning the 75-yard individual medley. Exhibiting an early interest in business and public speaking at Hurley High, around his Junior year Sohl won an award for a speech he presented on Inflation at a Wisconsin state-wide tournament. Having distinguished himself in swimming, by 1945, in his Senior year, Sohl attended the strong academic and swimming school, Mercersburg Academy in Mercersburg, Pennsylvania, around 63 miles West of York. Mercersburg Academy competed against York High School during Sohl's 1945 swimming season with Mercersburg. Sohl lettered in Swimming at Mercersburg in his Senior year.

== 1948 London Olympics ==
On July 10, 1948, Sohl placed third in the finals of the 200-meter breaststroke at the U.S. Olympic trials in Detroit, qualifying for the U.S. Olympic team.

Sohl represented the United States at the 1948 Summer Olympics in London, where he received a bronze medal for his third-place performance in the men's 200-meter breaststroke, finishing in 2:43.9 behind fellow Americans Joe Verdeur and Keith Carter, and completing an American sweep of the event. Verdeur, Carter and Sohl had finished in the same order at the 1948 U.S. Olympic Trials. Although Sohl's time was recorded by the timekeepers to be 0.2s slower than the fourth-place finisher, John Davies of Australia, the judges believed that Sohl had touched first and awarded him the bronze.

== University of Michigan ==
Coach Matt Mann, 1925

Sohl attended the University of Michigan, where he swam for the Michigan Wolverines swimming and diving team in National Collegiate Athletic Association (NCAA) competition from 1947 to 1949 under Hall of Fame Coach Matthew Mann. In March, 1947, Sohl set an intercollegiate record for the 200-yard freestyle with a time of 2:21.4, though the Michigan wolverines finished second to Ohio State in the Big 9 conference that year. In 1947, one of Sohl's breaststroke competitors at Conference rival Ohio State was James Counsilman, a future Hall of Fame swim coach. By March 1947, Sohl had completed the 200-yard breaststroke, in a time of 2:21.6, which fell under a former world record time of 2:22 held by Princeton's Dick Hough. In 1947, Sohl also set the record for the 100-meter breaststroke. World records for breaststroke in the 1940s were not retained in many contemporary record books, as the breaststroke at the time included the option for an over the water recovery with the arms, and could be swum with a different style kick than the current breaststroke. At the National American Athletic Union Outdoor Meet in Tyler, Texas, in the Summer of 1947, Sohl swam the breaststroke leg of a 3x100 meter medley that set a world record of 3:15.3. He set the new record with Michigan teammates Harry Holiday who swam backstroke, and Dick Weinberg who swam the freestyle anchor leg.

In 1948, Sohl's University of Michigan swimming team won the NCAA Division I national team championship in a close meet against the powerful Ohio State swim team, who would win the Championship five times between 1945 and 1950. Freestyler and future Hall of Fame Michigan swim coach Gus Stager was one of Sohl's teammates on the University of Michigan Swim team as was Coach Mann's son, Matthew Mann III. Swimming for Michigan on February 2, 1948, against a team of American Athletic Union Middle Atlantic All-Star swimmers, Sohl lowered his time in the 100-yard breaststroke to :60 seconds flat, leading Michigan to win the meet, while setting an unofficial world record.

=== Army service and marriage ===
Sohl began service with the U.S. Army in September, 1950, and attended Officers Candidate School in Fort Sill, Oklahoma, through December 1951, where he was commissioned as a Second Lieutenant in the Field Artillery Officer's Corps. He served at Camp McCoy in Tomah, Wisconsin, and in the Far East Command traditionally assigned to Japan and Korea. In mid-1952 he served at Fort Dix, South of Trenton, New Jersey, and during a cold winter in February 1953 had a temporary six week assignment at Camp Drum, in Northeastern New York, which involved testing weapons in very cold weather conditions. He completed his Army service on June 17, 1953 after 34 months of active service subsequent to officer training.

On July 11, 1953, after completing his Army service, Sohl married Dorothy Frances Williams, of Margaretville, New York, at the Margaretville Methodist Church. Dorothy was a Registered Nurse, who attended Cranford, New Jersey's Union Jr. College and completed her nursing degree at Elizabeth General Hospital in Elizabeth, New Jersey. Dorothy's father, the Reverend Hanford H. Williams performed the ceremony.

=== Post-swimming careers ===
In 1950, Sohl accepted a position with the Standard Register Company, then based in Dayton, Ohio which was interrupted by his Army service. Standard Register produced business forms, which were accessed using computer programs by at least the early 1960s. Sohl initially lived in greater Columbus, Ohio. Ending his Army service in 1953, in August 1958 Sohl worked as a District Sales Manager for Standard Register's Buffalo, New York office. In the early 1960s, he lived in the greater Dallas, Texas area, and spoke to a few area Data Processing Management professional societies. Skilled in Data Processing, Sohl became an experienced Systems Analyst, a designer and maintainer of information systems used by Sohl primarily for business management software. He accepted a position with Xerox Corporation in 1964 and worked his way into a position as Regional Sales Manager for the Midwest. In May 1977, he became director of Training and Management at the Xerox Center in Leesburg, Virginia. During his business career, he lived in states including Louisiana, Texas, New York, and Virginia. In 1981, Sohl accepted an award presented from the Leesburg Garden Club to Xerox for conservation measures taken by the large 60-acre Xerox training center in Leesburg, Virginia. Sohl retired from Xerox around 1993 as a vice-president. He travelled extensively in his retirement, usually wintering in Florida where his mother Mary lived in Highland Beach from 1979 to 1989. He spent his summers during his retirement years in Colorado where he had siblings.

Sohl died at his home in Highland Beach, Florida in 2001 with family in attendance, at the age of 73. He and his wife Dorothy had three children.

=== Honors ===
After receiving his Olympic bronze medal, Sohl was presented with a gold cup by York Mayor Felix S. Bentzel at City Hall on the evening of August 24, 1948. After the award ceremony, he was driven from City Hall in an open car followed by a twelve car procession to the Old Homestead Inn where he was given a dinner in his honor by the YMCA's York Aquatic Club. He was later admitted to the York Area Sports Hall of Fame in 1993.

== See also ==
- List of Olympic medalists in swimming (men)
- List of University of Michigan alumni
