= Carlota Ríos =

Mexican diver

Personal information
- Full name: Carlota Virginia Ríos Laurenzana González
- Born: 26 August 1928 Mexico City, Mexico
- Died: December 2007 Mexico City, Mexico
- Resting place: Panteón Francés de la Piedad
Medal record
Women's diving
Representing Mexico
Pan American Games
| Silver medal – second place | 1951 Buenos Aires | 10 m platform |

Carlota Ríos Laurenzana (Note: In this Spanish name, the first or paternal surname is Ríos and the second or maternal family name is Laurenzana.) (26 August 1928 – December 2007) was a Mexican diver. She competed in the women's 10 metre platform event at the 1952 Summer Olympics.
