= Donald Harper =

American diver (1932–2017)

- Harper circa 1956

Personal information
- Full name: Donald de Wayne Harper
- National team: United States
- Born: June 4, 1932 Redwood City, California, U.S.
- Died: November 30, 2017 (aged 85) Upper Arlington, Ohio, U.S.
- Height: 164 cm (5 ft 5 in)
- Weight: 63 kg (139 lb)

Sport
- Sport: Diving
- College team: Ohio State University
- Coached by: Mike Peppe
Medal record
Representing the United States
Men's diving
Olympic Games
Silver medal – second place	1956 Melbourne	3 m springboard
Pan American Games
Silver medal – second place	1959 Chicago	10 m platform
Men's gymnastics
Pan American Games
Gold medal – first place	1955 Mexico City	Trampoline
Representing Ohio State
NCAA
Gold medal – first place	1956 Ann Arbor	Team title
Gold medal – first place	1956 Ann Arbor	3 meter diving

Donald de Wayne "Don" Harper (June 4, 1932 – November 30, 2017) was an American diver who competed for Ohio State University and won a silver medal in springboard diving at the 1956 Summer Olympics.

Harper was born in Redwood City, California on June 4, 1932, to Owen and Sarah Harper. In addition to his skills as a diver, he was an outstanding gymnast, taking first in the 1955 Pan American Games trampoline championship and winning All-America gymnastics honors that year.

Between 1950 and 1955, Harper won five US National championships, two NCAA championships, and five National AAU championships in the 3m springboard.

== 1956 Olympics ==
He won a silver medal in the 3 m springboard event at the 1956 Melbourne Olympic Games. Harper was not a top performer in the preliminaries, placing fifth, but earned the highest score in the final round. Ohio State divers nearly swept the first four finishes. Ohio State teammate Bob Clotworthy took the gold medal, winning the springboard diving championship, Harper finished second, and Ohio State teammate, Glen Whitten, finished fourth.

== Ohio State ==
Harper attended Ohio State University, enrolling in 1953, where he dove for Hall of Fame Coach Mike Peppe who also served as his 1956 U.S. Olympic Diving Coach. During his diving career, Harper captured AAU titles on the 1 metre springboard in 1959 and 1960. He won AAU titles in the 3 metre springboard indoors in 1956 and 1958, also winning the team title in 1956, his Olympic year.

He took the 3-metre outdoor title in 1955 and 1959. He won AAU platform diving honors in 1961. In 1956, he was NCAA champion on the 3-metre springboard, and on both the 1- and 3-metre springboards in 1958. He also won the NCAA trampoline championship in 1956 while at Ohio State.

Harper also won a silver medal at the 1959 Pan American ten-meter platform event.

== Career ==
Harper earned an undergraduate, master's, and doctoral degree from Ohio State in physical education, health and physiology. He stayed on staff at the University as a professor of physiology, retiring from diving around 1961. He worked as a professor of Physiology at Ohio State, and occasionally travelled to teach diving concepts for a number of years. As an innovative and highly educated coach, Harper discovered a new way to capture the detailed motion of a tumble through the air by strapping a small film camera to his chest. As an innovative coach and a professor of physiology at Ohio State, Harper continued to influence divers the world over. He worked at Ohio State and coached diving for a number of years.

Dr. Donald D. Harper died on November 30, 2017, at the age of 85 in Upper Arlington, Ohio. He was survived by his wife Dr. Sandra Harper, his daughter, Anne (Tim) Halliday, and grandchildren.

== Honors ==
He is a member of The Ohio State Athletic Hall of Fame, the International Swimming Hall of Fame, and the World Acrobatics Society Hall of Fame. In August 2018, he was named to the College Swimming & Diving Coaches Association of America's Centennial List of the 100 Greatest Swimmers and Divers. In January 1962, he received Diver of the Year honors from the Columbus Touchdown Club for his performance in 1961.

== See also ==
- List of members of the International Swimming Hall of Fame
