= Miller Anderson (diver) =

American diver (1922–1965)

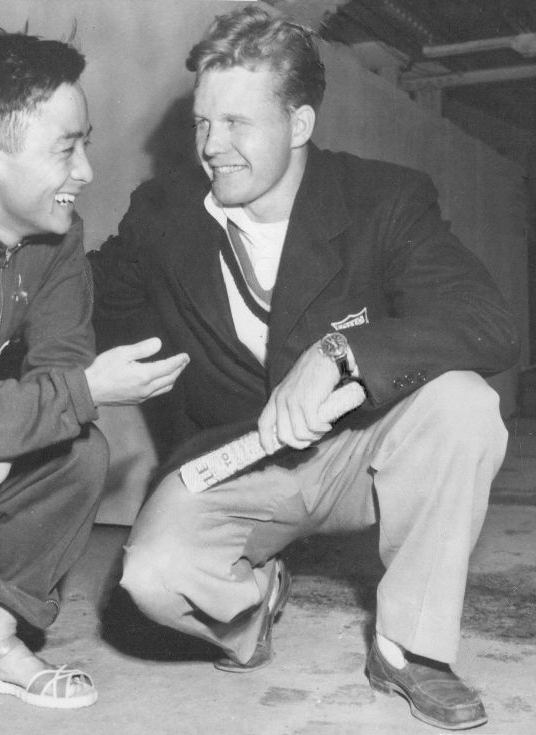
- Anderson (right) with Sammy Lee in 1948

Personal information
- Full name: Miller Altman Anderson
- Born: December 27, 1922 Columbus, Ohio, U.S.
- Died: October 29, 1965 (aged 42) Columbus, Ohio, U.S.
Medal record
Men's diving
Representing the United States
Olympic Games
Silver medal – second place	1948 London	Springboard
Silver medal – second place	1952 Helsinki	Springboard
Pan American Games
Silver medal – second place	1951 Buenos Aires	Springboard
Bronze medal – third place	1951 Buenos Aires	Platform
Representing Ohio State
NCAA
Gold medal – first place	1946 New Haven	One-meter diving
Gold medal – first place	1946 New Haven	Three-meter diving
Gold medal – first place	1947 Seattle	One-meter diving
Gold medal – first place	1947 Seattle	Three-meter diving
Gold medal – first place	1948 Ann Arbor	Three-meter diving

Miller Altman Anderson (December 27, 1922 – October 29, 1965) was an American diver, who won his first national diving championship in 1942, in the 3-meter springboard. A flyer during World War II, he was forced to parachute from his plane on his 112th mission, and his left leg was severely injured. A silver plate was inserted into his knee, and he had to learn to dive all over again after the war.

Representing Ohio State, Anderson won the NCAA 3-meter championship, the national 1-meter championship, and the national 3-meter championship in 1946, 1947, and 1948. He also won silver medals in the springboard event at the 1948 and 1952 Summer Olympics. Anderson was the first to perform a forward one-and-a-half somersault with two twists and a backward one-and-a-half with one twist.

Anderson died of a heart attack in his home on October 29, 1965, aged 42. In 1967 he was inducted into the International Swimming Hall of Fame.

== See also ==
- List of members of the International Swimming Hall of Fame
