= Yury Kasakov =

Soviet diver

Personal information
- Native name: Юрий Касаков
- Nationality: Soviet
- Born: 30 November 1937 (age 88)

Sport
- Sport: Diving

Yury Kasakov (Russian: Юрий Касаков, also transliterated Yuri Kazakov; born 30 November 1937) is a Soviet diver. He competed in the men's 3 metre springboard event at the 1956 Summer Olympics.
