= 1946 NCAA swimming and diving championships =

American college aquatic sports competition

- Host city: New Haven, Connecticut
- Date(s): March 1946
- Venue(s): Payne Whitney Gymnasium; Yale University
- Teams: 17

The 1946 NCAA swimming and diving championships were contested in March 1946 at the Payne Whitney Gymnasium at Yale University in New Haven, Connecticut at the 10th annual NCAA-sanctioned swim meet to determine the team and individual national champions of men's collegiate swimming and diving among its member programs in the United States.

Ohio State topped the team standings for the second consecutive year, capturing the Buckeyes' third national title.

== Team standings ==
- (H) = Hosts
- (DC) = Defending champions
- Italics = Debut appearance

Rank	Team	Points
1st place, gold medalist(s)	Ohio State (DC)	61
2nd place, silver medalist(s)	Michigan	37
3rd place, bronze medalist(s)	Michigan State	18
4	Navy	14
4	Williams	14
6	Army	11
6	North Carolina	11
8	Cincinnati	9
10	Iowa State	6
10	Stanford	6
11	Purdue	5
12	Dartmouth	3
12	Harvard	3
12	Illinois	3
15	Minnesota	1
15	Wayne (MI)	1
15	Yale (H)	1

== Individual events ==
=== Swimming ===
Event	Champion	Team	Time
50-yard freestyle	Robbie Anderson	Stanford	23.1
100-yard freestyle	Halo Hirose	Ohio State	52.1
220-yard freestyle	Jack Hill	Ohio State	2:11.3
440-yard freestyle	Jack Hill	Ohio State	4:47.2
1,500-meter freestyle	Dave Maclay	Williams	20:26.2**
150-yard backstroke	Bob Cowell	Navy	1:35.6
200-yard butterfly	Charles Keating	Cincinnati	2:26.2
400-yard freestyle relay	Zigmund Indyke; John DeMond; James Quigley; Robert Allwardt	Michigan State	3:27.2
300-yard medley relay	Richard Fetterman; James Counsilman; Ted Hobert	Ohio State	2:57.0

=== Diving ===
Event	Champion	Team	Score
One-meter diving	Miller Anderson	Ohio State	101.96
Three-meter diving	Miller Anderson	Ohio State	118.10

== See also ==
- List of college swimming and diving teams
