= 1947 NCAA swimming and diving championships =

American college aquatic sports competition

- Host city: (Washington (state)) Seattle
- Date(s): March 1947
- Venue(s): Pavilion Pool; University of Washington
- Teams: 14
- Events: 11

The 1947 NCAA swimming and diving championships were contested in March 1947 at the Pavilion Pool at the University of Washington in Seattle at the 11th annual NCAA-sanctioned swim meet to determine the team and individual national champions of men's collegiate swimming and diving among its member programs in the United States.

Ohio State topped the team standings for the third consecutive year, capturing the Buckeyes' fourth national title.

== Team standings ==
- (H) = Hosts
- (DC) = Defending champions
- Italics = Debut appearance

Rank	Team	Points
1st place, gold medalist(s)	Ohio State (DC)	66
2nd place, silver medalist(s)	Michigan	39
3rd place, bronze medalist(s)	Stanford	24
4	Michigan State	18
5	Yale	14
6	Purdue	10
7	Washington (H)	8
8	California	6
8	La Salle	6
10	Northwestern	4
11	Hawaii	3
11	Rutgers	3
13	Nebraska	2
14	Iowa State	1

== Individual events ==
=== Swimming ===
Event	Champion	Team	Time
50-yard freestyle	Richard Weinberg	Michigan	23.3
100-yard freestyle	Richard Weinberg	Michigan	52.2
220-yard freestyle	Bill Smith	Ohio State	2:10.4
440-yard freestyle	Bill Smith	Ohio State	4:45.2
1,500-meter freestyle	George Hoogerhyde	Michigan State	19:44.2
150-yard backstroke	Harry Holiday	Michigan	1:33.6
200-yard butterfly	Joe Verdeur	La Salle	2:16.8
400-yard freestyle relay	William Zemer; Ted Hobert; Halo Hirose; Bill Smith	Ohio State	3:30.0
300-yard medley relay	Harry Holiday; Robert Sohl; Richard Weinberg	Michigan	2:54.9

=== Diving ===
Event	Champion	Team	Score
One-meter diving	Miller Anderson (DC)	Ohio State	151.10
Three-meter diving	Miller Anderson (DC)	Ohio State	172.62

== See also ==
- List of college swimming and diving teams
