= Arthur Winther =

Australian diver (1937–2022)

Personal information
- Nationality: Australian
- Born: 28 March 1937 Victoria, Australia
- Died: 16 April 2022 (aged 85) Wellington, New Zealand

Sport
- Sport: Diving

Arthur Winther (28 March 1937 – 16 April 2022) was an Australian diver. He competed in the men's 3 metre springboard event at the 1956 Summer Olympics.
