= 1948 NCAA swimming and diving championships =

American college aquatic sports competition

- Host city: Ann Arbor, Michigan
- Date(s): March 1948
- Venue(s): Intramural Sports Building; University of Michigan
- Teams: 16
- Events: 11

The 1948 NCAA swimming and diving championships were contested in March 1948 at the Intramural Sports Building at the University of Michigan in Ann Arbor, Michigan at the 12th annual NCAA-sanctioned swim meet to determine the team and individual national champions of men's collegiate swimming and diving among its member programs in the United States.

Hosts Michigan topped three-time defending champions, and rivals, Ohio State in the team standings, capturing the Wolverines' sixth national title.

== Team standings ==
- (H) = Hosts
- (DC) = Defending champions
- Italics = Debut appearance

Rank	Team	Points
1st place, gold medalist(s)	Michigan (H)	44
2nd place, silver medalist(s)	Ohio State (DC)	41
3rd place, bronze medalist(s)	Michigan State	21
4	Iowa	20
5	Stanford	16
6	Yale	14
7	Iowa State	10
7	Northwestern	10
9	La Salle	7
9	Purdue	7
11	Washington	4
12	USC	3
13	Temple	2
14	North Carolina	1
14	Penn	1
14	Texas	1

== Individual events ==
=== Swimming ===
Event	Champion	Team	Time
50-yard freestyle	Robert Anderson	Stanford	23.3
100-yard freestyle	Wally Ris	Iowa	51.5
220-yard freestyle	Bill Smith	Ohio State	2:09.5
440-yard freestyle	Bill Smith	Ohio State	4:43.8
1,500-meter freestyle	Bill Heusner	Northwestern	19:28.2
150-yard backstroke	Allan Stack	Yale	1:31.8
200-yard butterfly	Joe Verdeur	La Salle	2:14.7
400-yard freestyle relay	Abel Gilbert; George Hoogerhyde; Robert Allwardt; James Duke	Michigan State	3:31.0
300-yard medley relay	Harry Holiday; Robert Sohl; David Tittle	Michigan (DC)	2:54.9

=== Diving ===
Event	Champion	Team	Score
One-meter diving	Bruce Harlan	Ohio State	163.87
Three-meter diving	Miller Anderson (DC)	Ohio State	174.34

== See also ==
- List of college swimming and diving teams
