= Mike Peppe =

American swim coach (1898–1979)

Biographical details
- Born: March 10, 1898; New York City, US
- Died: September 2, 1979 (aged 81); Columbus, Ohio, US
- Education: Ohio State 1928; M.A. Columbia 1929

Coaching career (HC unless noted)
- 1931-1962: Ohio State University
- 1948, 1952: U.S. Olympic Coach; Diving Team
- 1951: U.S. Team Coach; Pan American Games

Head coaching record
- Overall: 173-37.82 Win % (Ohio State)

Accomplishments and honors

Championships
- 11 NCAA Championships; 12 Big Ten Championships; 10 NAAU Championships.

Awards
- International Swimming Hall of Fame; CSCAA Hall of Fame 2002; CSCAA Coaches of the Century

Mike Peppe (March 10, 1898 – September 2, 1979) was a Hall of Fame swim coach for Ohio State University from 1931 to 1962, where he led the team to 11 NCAA, 12 Big Ten, and 10 AAU Championships. With an exceptional winning percentage at Ohio State in dual meets of 82%, and an unmatched record of 11 NCAA national swimming and diving championships, the American Swimming Coaches Association named Peppe to its list of the 100 greatest coaches of the past century.

== Early life and education ==
Peppe was born in New York City in March 1898, and at the age of 10 moved to Columbus, where he attended and graduated Columbus's North High School. He served in the United States Army from October 4, 1918 to December 20, 1918. At Ohio State, he participated in football, basketball and baseball despite his diminutive height of 5' 4". After graduating Ohio State in 1927, he earned a master's degree from Columbia University in 1928. After graduating Columbia, he took his position with the physical education department at Ohio State University in the fall of 1928, making his collegiate coaching experience confined to the university.

== Coaching Ohio State ==
After four years on the Physical Education Staff, Peppe became the first swimming and diving coach at Ohio State in January 1931. Assisting him on his staff was Coach L. W. St. John. In his earliest years as coach, Peppe's teams were only runners-up on the national level in 1937, 1938, and 1939. But, after winning their first national championship in 1943, Ohio State had unheralded success. In the twenty years from 1943 to 1963, there were only six years when Peppe's Ohio State teams failed to finish first or second in the national swimming and diving competition. Under Peppe, Ohio State had NCAA or national Championships in 1943, 1945, 1946, 1947, 1949, 1950, 1952, 1954, 1955, 1956, and 1962. His teams were undefeated in dual meets during 12 seasons.

Peppe is considered to have laid the foundation for the legacy of excellence associated with Ohio State's swimming and diving teams. His swimmers and divers dominated the sport in a way few teams have ever matched. Under his studied management, Ohio State Swimmers won 312 individual championships, which included 94 NCAA, 100 AAU and 94 Big Ten titles.

During his tenure at Ohio State, his swimmers won 5 Olympic gold medals and 19 of his athletes qualified for the U.S. Olympic team. In both 1947 and 1956, excelling even more as a diving coach, Peppe's divers took 1st through 4th place, dominating the competition in the NCAA diving finals. By 1953, his teams had won six indoor and four outdoor American Athletic Union national titles, before college teams were excluded from the competition. Bob Bartels, both Peppe's assistant coach and 1951-53 Ohio State swimmer under Peppe, replaced him as head coach in 1963.

Peppe's coaching strategy was to analyze each swimmer and develop a training program that addressed individual shortcomings, with the goal of producing the best performance in competition. He contributed a wide variety and a large number of articles on swimming to newspapers and magazines.

== International coaching ==
Peppe coached the U.S. Olympic diving team at London in 1948 as well as in Helsinki in 1952. He served as both swimming and diving coach for the American team at the first recognized Pan American Games in Buenos Aires in 1951. In the four Olympic Games from World War II until Peppe retired, Peppe's teams at Ohio State sent 19 of the 92 members. The U.S. Olympic team in 1952 had 25 Ohio State swimmers and divers.

His notable swimmers at Ohio State included Olympic medalists Bill Smith, Ford Konno and Yoshi Oyakawa. All three were from Hawaii, and all but Konno had been coached by Soichi Sakamoto and his Hawaiian Swim Club in Honolulu. Hall of Fame Indiana Coach Doc Counsilman, considered one of the greatest 20th century coaches, swam for Peppe and was mentored by him at Ohio State from 1940 to 1942. Hall of Fame swim coach Dr. Ernest Maglischo, who also researched swimming biomechanics and physiology, swam for Peppe in the late 1950's. At the 1952 Olympics in Melbourne, Australia, Ohio State swimmers Bob Clotworthy won the springboard diving championship, Donald Harper finished second, and Glen Whitten finished fourth.

He retired from Ohio State in 1962. He served first on Ohio State's Physical Education Staff from 1928-1931, and then served as the first swimming and diving head coach from 1931-1962. After a long illness with cancer, Peppe died at his home on September 2, 1979. He was survived by a brother Louis and sister Mary, both Columbus residents, and was buried in Union Cemetery in Columbus, a common resting place for long-serving Ohio State faculty.

== Honors ==
Peppe was inducted into both the American Swimming Coaches Hall of Fame in 2002 and in a more exclusive honor, was inducted into the International Swimming Hall of Fame in 1966. In a lasting tribute to his achievements, the old competition pool at Ohio State, originally opened in the 1931–32 season, was named the Mike Peppe Aquatic Center. Peppe and Coach L. W. St. John planned the three-pool natatorium, and dedicated it on February 26, 1931, the year Peppe began as Coach. It was the first pool in America with a seven-foot shallow end, and a twelve-foot diving end. In January 1977, Ohio State swimmers relocated into the new $4 million Mike Peppe Aquatic Center, both an addition and renovation to the existing building at the university's Larkins Hall. The new structure contains an eight-lane, 50-meter pool, with two smaller 25-yard pools of five and six lanes each, and a large modern diving well with four spring boards and one diving platform. The new diving area, is considered one of the most modern and well-equipped in electronic scoring features in the nation.

The College Swimming & Diving Coaches of Association of America (CSAA) included Peppe in its one list of the "100 Greatest Collegiate Swimming & Diving Coaches of the century".
