= Glen Whitten =

American diver (1936–2014)

- Whitten circa 1956 at Olympics

Personal information
- Full name: Glen Allen Whitten
- National team: United States
- Born: February 24, 1936 Lakeland, Florida, United States
- Died: September 15, 2014 (aged 78) Vermont, United States
- Height: 171 cm (5 ft 7 in)
- Weight: 66 kg (146 lb)

Sport
- Sport: Diving, Swimming
- College team: Ohio State University '58; Dental School '62
- Coached by: Mike Peppe

Glen Allen Whitten (February 24, 1936 – September 15, 2014) was an American diver and 1956 Olympic 3-meter springboard competitor who was an All American and NCAA champion for Ohio State University, and later worked as a dentist and inventor.

== High school swimming ==
Born in Lakeland, Florida, Whitten attended and both dove and swam for St. Petersburg High School under Head Coach Jerry Ruelf, graduating around June 1953. He led his High School team to take first in the team competition at the Division II regional championship in May 1953, by winning the diving competition and the Individual Medley in Tampa Bay, qualifying his team for the State Championship the following week. At the State Championships in Daytona, Florida, he won a diving event, taking a state title. On August 1, 1953, Whitten won the Senior Men's Diving Championships at the 11th Annual Mid-South Swimming Championships in Chattanooga, Tennessee. Whitten placed 20 points ahead of second place Spencer Boyd of Athens, Georgia.

== 1956 Olympics ==
He competed in the men's 3 metre springboard event at the 1956 Summer Olympics, placing fourth, which put him out of medal contention. He had placed third in the preliminaries, but lost ground when his U.S. teammates Bob Clotworthy and Donald Harper outperformed him in the final round. He and his U.S. Olympic teammates, who also dove with him at Ohio State, nearly swept the first four finishes. Ohio State teammate Bob Clotworthy took the gold medal, winning the springboard diving championship, another Ohio State teammate Donald Harper finished second, and Whitten, finished fourth.

== Ohio State ==
He attended Ohio State University enrolling around the Fall of 1953, where he swam and dove for International Hall of Fame Head Coach Mike Peppe and was a member of Sigma Pi fraternity. At Ohio State, he took third in the NCAA 1-meter and 3-meter springboard competitions in 1955.

In June 1957, while at Ohio State, he was named to the All-America Team with a first standing in the 1-meter dive, and a third place standing in the 3-meter dive. With an exceptionally strong diving team that year, his Ohio State teammate Richard Harper took first in the 3-meter dive, and Ohio State teammates swept both second and third in the 1-meter dive. Whitten completed a bachelor's degree from Ohio State in 1958 and later a dental degree in 1962. In the summer of 1956, after graduating Ohio State, he competed in AAU competition while training with the Cincinnati Coca-Cola team

== Post-swimming careers ==
After working in his dental practice for a number of years, including a stint in New York City in the 1960s, where he also coached 13-year diver Frank D'Amico at the New York Athletic Club, he focused his attention on inventions, and completed several patents, including one for Dzidra Glasses which were bulky glasses intended to reduce the frequency of migraines or tension headaches. In the 1980s, they were used successfully in an experiment to reduce tension, and were found to be more successful with tension-induced headaches. The glasses had a battery-powered liquid crystal diode that flickered on a low frequency, one to three times per second. Later with a light source added inside the glasses, they did successfully cure headaches in some patients, often more rapidly than aspirin. One theory as to why the glasses successfully eliminated headaches is that the strobe light effect produced alpha waves which caused relaxation. Whitten began working to learn more about the effects of strobe lights on brain waves in the 1950s. He began marketing the glasses in early 1985, at a cost between $30 and $100.
