= Sammy Lee (diver) =

American diver (1920–2016)

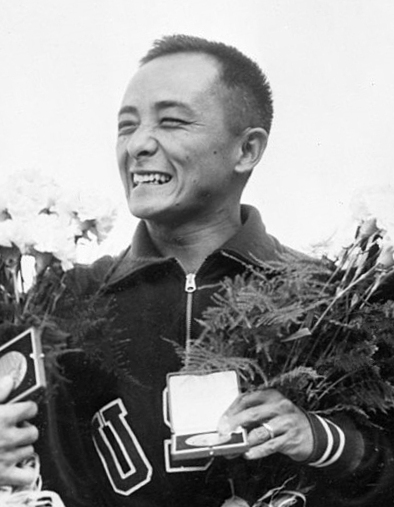
- Lee at the 1952 Olympics

Personal information
- Full name: Samuel Lee
- Nationality: American
- Born: August 1, 1920 Fresno, California, U.S.
- Died: December 2, 2016 (aged 96) Newport Beach, California, U.S.
- Resting place: Fort Rosecrans National Cemetery
- Education: Occidental College (B.S.); University of Southern California School of Medicine (M.D.)
- Spouse: Rosalind Wong
- Military career
- Allegiance: United States of America
- Branch: United States Army Medical Corps
- Service years: 1947-1955
- Rank: Major

Sport
- Country: United States
- Sport: Diving
Medal record
Men's diving
Representing the United States
Olympic Games
Gold medal – first place	1948 London	10 m platform
Gold medal – first place	1952 Helsinki	10 m platform
Bronze medal – third place	1948 London	3 m springboard
Pan American Games
Silver medal – second place	1951 Buenos Aires	10 m platform
Bronze medal – third place	1951 Buenos Aires	3 m springboard

Samuel "Sammy" Lee (August 1, 1920 – December 2, 2016) was an American physician and diver. He was the first Asian American man to win an Olympic gold medal for the United States (the second Asian American to win a gold medal overall) and the first man to win back-to-back gold medals in Olympic platform diving.

== Early life and education ==
Lee was born in Fresno, California, to parents of Korean descent who owned what he described as "a little chop suey restaurant". His father was fluent in English and Korean, tutored in French, graduated with a degree in civil engineering from Occidental College, and opened a chop suey restaurant and market. As a twelve-year-old living near Los Angeles in 1932, Lee saw and was motivated by the many Olympics banners and souvenirs on display for the Summer Olympics being held in Los Angeles that year. Later that summer, he found that he could do somersaults much better than all of his friends, which led to his goal of becoming an Olympic champion in diving.

Lee's parents moved to Highland Park, a neighborhood of Los Angeles. At the time, however, Latinos, Asians and African-Americans were only allowed to use the nearby Brookside Park Plunge in Pasadena on Wednesdays, on what was called "international day,” the day before the pool was scheduled to be drained and refilled with clean water. Because Lee needed a place to practice and could not regularly use the public pool, his coach dug a pit in his backyard and filled it with sand. Lee practiced by jumping into the pit.

Lee attended Franklin High School and later was a student-athlete at Occidental, where he received his undergraduate degree before attending the University of Southern California School of Medicine, where he received his M.D. in 1947. He joined the Army Reserve to pay for his medical school tuition.

In 1996 Lee was interviewed by Huell Howser in California's Gold Episode 702. During the interview, he explained how he worked as a locker boy at the Los Angeles Swimming Stadium at the same time Esther Williams worked as a locker girl.

== Diving career ==
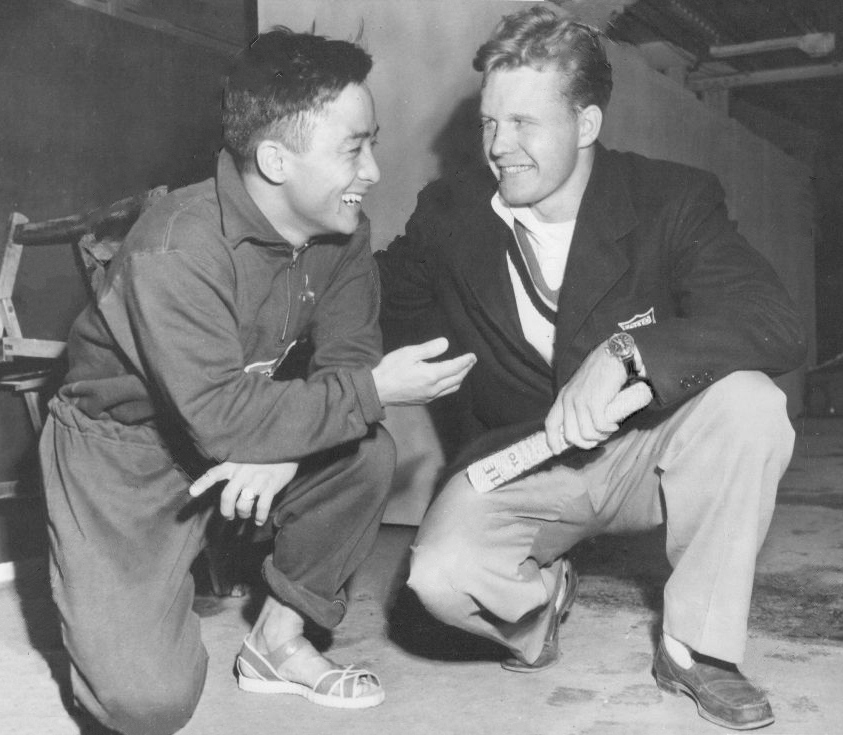
Lee with Miller Anderson in 1948

Under the tutelage of renowned diving coach Jim Ryan, Lee won the United States National Diving Championships in 1942 in both the 3-meter springboard and the 10-meter platform events, becoming the first person of color to capture the United States national championship in diving. In 1946, he again triumphed at the 10-meter platform event while finishing third at the 3-meter springboard competition at the national diving competition in San Diego.

At the 1948 Summer Olympics in London, England, Lee earned a bronze medal in the 3-meter springboard and a gold medal in 10-meter platform diving events. In so doing, he became the second Asian American to earn a gold medal, behind only Vicki Draves, who won an Olympic gold medal two days earlier in springboard diving.

== Military and medical careers ==
Four years later, by then a major in the United States Army Medical Corps, he expected to serve in the Korean War, but he was instead sent to compete in the Olympic Games ("but you better win", he was told). He won the gold medal in the 10-meter platform competition at the Olympics in Helsinki, Finland.

Lee served in the U.S. Army Medical Corps in South Korea from 1953 to 1955, where he specialized in diseases of the ear. In 1953, while serving his tour of duty in Korea, he won the James E. Sullivan Award in 1953, which is awarded annually by the Amateur Athletic Union to the most outstanding amateur athlete in the United States.

He continued to experience discrimination in later life. In 1955, he faced housing discrimination in Garden Grove, California, where he attempted to buy a home only to be told that he could not, and in one case having nearby residents gather petition signatures to "disallow" or discourage him from buying in "their" neighborhood. (In the latter case, a counterpetition sought to rectify this prejudice, but the discriminatory effect had been achieved, and Lee looked elsewhere.)

Lee practiced as an ear, nose and throat doctor for 35 years before retiring in 1990.

== Coaching ==
Following Lee's diving career, he helped coach two-time diving gold medalist Bob Webster. Later, he coached Greg Louganis, who lived with Lee's family before winning a silver medal in platform diving at the 1976 Olympics at the age of 16. Lee also coached Olympic medalist Pat McCormick.

In 1979, Lee played himself in Silent Victory: The Kitty O'Neil Story, about stuntwoman Kitty O'Neil, whom Lee had coached in diving.

== Honors and awards ==
Lee was inducted into the International Swimming Hall of Fame in 1968, and was inducted into the U.S. Olympic Hall of Fame in 1990.

Sammy Lee Square, at the corner of Olympic Boulevard and Normandie Avenue in Los Angeles' Koreatown, was named after him in 2010. He was also honored with a spot on the Anaheim/Orange County Walk of Stars in 2009. The Sammy Lee award for diving, presented only once every four years, was named in his honor. The Los Angeles Unified School District honored Lee by renaming Central Region Elementary School #20 as the Dr. Sammy Lee Medical and Health Sciences Magnet School in 2013.

== Personal life and death ==
Lee was married to Rosalind Wong; the couple had a daughter and a son. Lee died from complications of pneumonia on December 2, 2016, at his home in Newport Beach, California, aged 96. He also suffered from dementia and heart disease.

== See also ==
- List of members of the International Swimming Hall of Fame
