= 1949 NCAA swimming and diving championships =

American college aquatic sports competition

- Host city: Chapel Hill, North Carolina
- Date(s): March 1949
- Venue(s): Bowman Gray Pool; University of North Carolina
- Teams: 20
- Events: 12

The 1949 NCAA swimming and diving championships were contested in March 1949 at the Bowman Gray Pool at the University of North Carolina in Chapel Hill, North Carolina at the 13th annual NCAA-sanctioned swim meet to determine the team and individual national champions of men's collegiate swimming and diving among its member programs in the United States.

After finishing second in 1948, Ohio State once again topped the team standings, claiming their fourth title in five years and their fifth title overall.

== Program changes ==
- One event, 150-yard individual medley, was re-added to the NCAA championships program this year; it was contested once before, in 1930.

== Team standings ==
- (H) = Hosts
- (DC) = Defending champions
- Italics = Debut appearance

Rank	Team	Points
1st place, gold medalist(s)	Ohio State	49
2nd place, silver medalist(s)	Iowa	35
3rd place, bronze medalist(s)	Michigan (DC)	32
4	Yale	18
5	La Salle	12
6	Purdue	11
7	Michigan State	10
7	Northwestern	10
9	North Carolina (H)	7
10	Rutgers	6
10	USC	6
12	Dartmouth	4
12	Stanford	4
12	Washington	4
15	Harvard	3
16	Cincinnati	2
16	Duke	2
16	Penn	2
16	Texas	2
20	Iowa State	1

== Individual events ==
=== Swimming ===
Event	Champion	Team	Time
50-yard freestyle	Richard Weinberg	Michigan	23.1
100-yard freestyle	Wally Ris (DC)	Iowa	50.4
220-yard freestyle	Bill Smith (DC)	Ohio State	2:08.5
440-yard freestyle	Bill Smith (DC)	Ohio State	4:42.6
1,500-meter freestyle	Bill Heusner (DC)	Northwestern	19:04.8
150-yard backstroke	Bob deGroot	Ohio State	1:34.0
200-yard butterfly	Keith Carter	Purdue	2:14.8
150-yard individual medley	Joe Verdeur	La Salle	1:30.8
400-yard freestyle relay	Paul Girdes; Bill Farnsworth; Larry Munson; Ray Reid	Yale	3:27.0
300-yard medley relay	Duane Draves; Bowen Stassforth; Ervin Straub	Iowa	2:54.1

=== Diving ===
Event	Champion	Team	Score
One-meter diving	Bruce Harlan (DC)	Ohio State	142.41
Three-meter diving	Bruce Harlan	Ohio State	152.37

== See also ==
- List of college swimming and diving teams
