= Diving at the 1951 Pan American Games =

The Diving Competition for men and women at the 1951 Pan American Games was held from February 25 to March 3, 1951, in Buenos Aires, Argentina. There were two events, for both men and women.

== Medal table ==
| Place | Nation | Gold medal | Silver medal | Bronze medal | Total |
|---|---|---|---|---|---|
| 1 | United States | 2 | 3 | 3 | 8 |
| 2 | Mexico | 2 | 1 | 0 | 3 |
| 3 | Guatemala | 0 | 0 | 1 | 1 |
| Total | | 4 | 4 | 4 | 12 |

== Medalists ==
=== Men ===
| Event | Gold | Silver | Bronze |
|---|---|---|---|
| 3 metre springboard | Joaquín Capilla; Mexico | Miller Anderson; United States | Samuel Lee; United States |
| 10 metre platform | Joaquín Capilla; Mexico | Samuel Lee; United States | Miller Anderson; United States |

=== Women ===
| Event | Gold | Silver | Bronze |
|---|---|---|---|
| 3 metre springboard | Mary Cunningham; United States | Pat McCormick; United States | Dolores Castillo; Guatemala |
| 10 metre platform | Pat McCormick; United States | Carlota Ríos; Mexico | Mary Cunningham; United States |

== See also ==
- Diving at the 1952 Summer Olympics
