= Diving at the 1956 Summer Olympics – Men's 3 metre springboard =

Men's 3 metre springboard at the Games of the XVI Olympiad

Medalists
1st place, gold medalist(s)		Bob Clotworthy	United States
2nd place, silver medalist(s)		Donald Harper	United States
3rd place, bronze medalist(s)		Joaquín Capilla	Mexico

The men's 3 metre springboard, also reported as springboard diving, was one of four diving events on the Diving at the 1956 Summer Olympics programme.

The competition was split into two phases held on different days:

- Preliminary round (30 November) – Divers performed five voluntary dives of limited degrees of difficulty and one voluntary dive without limits. The twelve divers with the highest scores advanced to the final.
- Final (1 December) – Divers performed four voluntary dives without any limits of difficulty. The final score was the aggregate of the preliminary and final rounds' points.

== Results ==
Rank	Diver	Nation	Preliminary		Final		
Rank	Diver	Nation	Points	Rank	Points	Rank	Total
1st place, gold medalist(s)	Bob Clotworthy	United States	90.07	2	69.49	2	159.56
2nd place, silver medalist(s)	Donald Harper	United States	83.42	5	72.81	1	156.23
3rd place, bronze medalist(s)	Joaquín Capilla	Mexico	90.24	1	60.45	3	150.69
4	Glen Whitten	United States	89.20	3	59.35	4	148.55
5	Gennady Udalov	Soviet Union	83.06	6	57.58	5	140.64
6	Roman Brener	Soviet Union	83.82	4	55.32	8	139.14
7	Günther Mund	Chile	80.54	7	56.99	6	137.53
8	József Gerlach	Hungary	80.45	8	55.63	7	136.08
9	Yury Kasakov	Soviet Union	74.68	12	54.66	9	129.34
10	William Patrick	Canada	75.64	11	51.68	10	127.32
10	Juan Botella	Mexico	78.27	9	49.05	12	127.32
12	Yutaka Baba	Japan	77.77	10	49.10	11	126.87
13	Ferenc Siák	Hungary	74.60	13	did not advance		
14	Christian Pire	France	74.33	14	did not advance		
15	Helge Vasenius	Finland	73.82	15	did not advance		
16	Peter Tarsey	Great Britain	72.65	16	did not advance		
17	Arthur Winther	Australia	71.04	17	did not advance		
18	Ryo Mabuchi	Japan	70.82	18	did not advance		
19	Joseph McCann	Australia	69.18	19	did not advance		
20	Ronald Faulds	Australia	68.84	20	did not advance		
21	Ray Cann	Great Britain	67.96	21	did not advance		
22	Yoav Raanan	Israel	65.14	22	did not advance		
23	Fernando Ribeiro	Brazil	62.07	23	did not advance		
24	Roy Walsh	Great Britain	58.21	24	did not advance		

== Sources ==
- The Organizing Committee of the XV Olympiad, Melbourne, 1956 (1958). "The Official Report of the Organizing Committee of the XVI Olympiad Melbourne 1956" (PDF). The Organizing Committee of the XV Olympiad, Melbourne, 1956. pp. p. 607. Archived from the original (PDF) on 12 September 2008.
- Herman de Wael (24 May 2001). "Diving - men's springboard (Melbourne 1956)".
