= Bob Bartels =

American swim coach (1928–2017)

Robert Louis Bartels

Biographical details
- Born: November 14, 1928; Gettysburg, South Dakota, US
- Died: June 6, 2017 (aged 88); Columbus, Ohio, US
- Education: Ohio State University (BSc, MA & PhD)

Playing career
- 1946-1947: Moorhead State College
- 1947-1950: Ohio State University; Mike Peppe, Coach
- Position: backstroke

Coaching career (HC unless noted)
- 1952-1954: Kenyon College
- 1954-1959: Ohio University
- 1959-1962: Ohio State University; Asst. Coach under Mike Peppe
- 1963-1967: Ohio State University; Head coach

Accomplishments and honors

Championships
- 1962 NCAA National Championship (Ohio State University); 1954 Ohio Conference Championship (Kenyon College)

Awards
- '72 CSCAA Distinguished Coach Award '80 CSCAA Award for Service to Aquat. Sports

Robert Louis Bartels (November 14, 1928 - June 6, 2017) was an American swim coach for Kenyon College, Ohio University and Ohio State University from 1952 to 1967, leading Kenyon to an Ohio Conference Championship and their first undefeated season in 1954, and Ohio State University to an NCAA National Championship in 1962. He was elected to the board and later was president of the College Swimming Coaches Association of America from 1971 to 1972.

== Early life ==
Bartels was born on a farm on November 14, 1928, in Gettysburg, South Dakota, to Mr. and Mrs. Adolph W. Bartels, and grew up in Fargo, North Dakota, where he attended and swam for Fargo's Central High School. His father Adolph worked as a Sales Manager for Fargo's Smith Incorporated, a company that built shell boxes and grain bins under contract from the U.S. government during WWII, and later had divisions for truck, farm, and construction equipment.

His family moved to Mandan, North Dakota in 1946. In the summer of 1947, Bartels swam at the Minneapolis Aquatennial Meet, winning the 100-yard and placing second in the 50-yard freestyle sprint events. At the Minneapolis Aquatennial in 1946, he placed second overall, and placed first in the 1947 Detroit Lakes Meet. Attracting the attention of outstanding swimming competitors, 1920 Olympic backstroker and film star Harold "Stubby" Kruger considered Bartels, "One of the nation's best".

=== Swimming for Ohio State ===
He swam for South Dakota's Moorhead State Teachers College his freshman year, working as a lifeguard in the summer of 1947, and then transferred to Ohio State University from 1947 to 1950 where he lettered all three years, graduating in 1951 with a BSc. in Education. During his time swimming with Ohio State under Hall of Fame Coach Mike Peppe, the team won three Big 10 and two NCAA championships. In 1949, Bartels was named to the Collegiate All-American swimming team, and was considered by several coaches to be "one of the best breaststrokers in the country". During the summer, Bartels also swam for Fargo's swimming team where on August 8, 1948 he led Fargo to win the Annual Bismarck Swimming meet, by swimming a winning 40-yard backstroke in 25 seconds, and a local record breaking winning time of 1:11.9 in the 120-yard freestyle.

== Coaching swimming ==
While earning his Master of Arts degree at Ohio State in Education with a focus on Physical Education from 1950 through 1952, he worked as a graduate assistant and freshman swimming coach at the university.

Shortly after graduating from Ohio State, Bartels was married to Janet Cowl Redman on June 9, 1951, at the Zeta Tau Alpha Sorority on the Ohio State Campus in Columbus. A Sigma Chi fraternity brother attended Bob as Best Man, and a reception for fifty was held after the ceremony. In the summer of 1951, Bartels managed the swimming pool in Mandan, North Dakota while he stayed with his parents, Mr. and Mrs. A.W. Bartels in Mandan. In September 1951, Bartel's wife Janet returned to Ohio State to complete her degree, and Bartels began working towards his Master of Arts which he completed in 1952.

=== Kenyon College ===
His first Head Coaching job was at Kenyon College from 1952 to 1954, where he also served as a tennis coach, and athletic director, and notably led the team to an Ohio Conference Championship held at Ohio Wesleyan on March 6, 1954. In 1954, with Bartels as coach, Kenyon swimmers had their first undefeated season with nine straight victories in dual meets. The team set six new school records that year, and won the Ohio Conference with 82 points, 33 points ahead of second place Ohio Wesleyan. Senior Al Eastman won the 440-yard free at the Conference Championship with a time of 5:04, placing first in the competition for the third straight year. Ted Fitzsimmons set school records in 1954 in the 50, 100 and 220-yard freestyle, and at the Ohio Conference Championship won the 100-yard freestyle in :54.1. Kenyon also won the 400-yard freestyle event with a conference record time of 3:47.8. Bartels described the Ohio Conference Championship victory as "his greatest thrill ever in coaching". Kenyon continued to have an outstanding swim program, and a long winning streak in dual meets.

=== Ohio University, Athens ===
Bartels coached tennis and swimming and taught courses in Physical Education at Ohio University in Athens from 1954 through September 1959 when he left to work towards his Doctorate. In 1954, prior to Bartels coaching, the Ohio University, Athens, Bobcat swimming team were Mid-Atlantic Conference Champions. At Ohio University, one of Bartels's top swimmers in 1956 was All American team captain Tad Potter.

=== Ohio State ===
Returning to Ohio State University to earn his Doctorate in the fall of 1959, he worked as an Assistant Swim Coach at the university during his studies. He completed his Ph.D. from Ohio State in 1961, and began a career as an assistant professor in the Department of Physical Education in 1962. In 1963, he was named Head Coach of Ohio State, succeeding legendary Hall of Fame coach Mike Peppe, for whom he swam as an Ohio State student. In Bartels's first year at Ohio State, he led the team to a National Championship.

Among Bartels's most outstanding swimmers was L.B. Schaefer who won both the 100 and 200-yard backstroke at the 1962 NCAA swimming championships, where Bartel, serving as the Assistant Coach, helped Ohio State swimmers take the team championship. Schaefer was a three time All American, won a Big 10 title in 1962, and was an Ohio State Athletic Hall of fame inductee. An outstanding diver was Miller Anderson, who captured diving championships after coming from a WWII injury. Ted Fitzsimmons, Captain Al Eastman, and Phil Payton were three of Bartels's outstanding swimmers at Kenyon College the year the swim team was undefeated and won the Ohio Conference. Acting as a Guest Speaker for the Marion, Ohio Aquatic Club, Bartels told the audience that determination, desire, courage, background and the willingness to participate and sacrifice were the qualities he looked for in the swimmers he recruited.

=== Service to the community ===
In 1968 Bartels was chosen by election to the Board of Directors of the College Swimming Coaches Association of America, and ascended to the role of President in 1971, where he served for two years. In a long serving role, he was the Chairman of Safety Services for the Columbus Area Chapter of the American Red Cross from 1963 through 1986. Named Professor of Physical Education at Ohio State in 1972, in 1975, he started the Faculty Fitness Program with which he continued work with through 1989. Greatly contributing to the collective knowledge in his field of study, Bartels produced over thirty academic publications and thirteen academic papers on cardiac rehabilitation and a variety of other related subjects related to physical education.

In an important legacy to the medical community, Bartels helped create the Cardiac Rehabilitation Program at OSU in 1980, a project shared by the Department of Health, Physical Education and Recreation, and the Student Health Center. The program changed the focus of cardiac rehabilitation from rest to one of gradually building fitness, which had the potential to greatly improve the quality of life and increase the lifespan of heart attack victims, and other cardiac rehabilitation patients. He served as President of the Ohio State University Faculty Club in 1984. He retired as a professor at the university on January 1, 1989. He then served as a professor emeritus in the College of Education, (Exercise Science), where he continued to teach courses in Physical Education.

After his retirement as an OSU Professor in 1989, and his service as a professor emeritus, Bartels was a member of the Ohio State Retirees Association. In 1991, he was elected as President of the organization.

Bartels died on June 6, 2017, in Columbus, Ohio. On the morning of Monday, June 12, a memorial service was held at Covenant Presbyterian Church on Lane Avenue in Columbus. Bartels was survived by his wife, Janet Redman Bartels, and three children, all of whom attended Ohio State.

=== Honors ===
Bartels was the recipient of numerous awards, with most coming after his service as Coach at Ohio State University. In 1972, the CSCAA honored him with the Distinguished Coaches Award. In 1979 he was named a Fellow of the American College of Sports Medicine, (FACSM). The CSCAA made him the recipient of their Honor Award for Service to Aquatic Sports in 1980. In 1998, he was inducted into the Ohio State University Athletic Hall of Fame.
