= Bruce Harlan =

American Olympic diver (1926–1959)

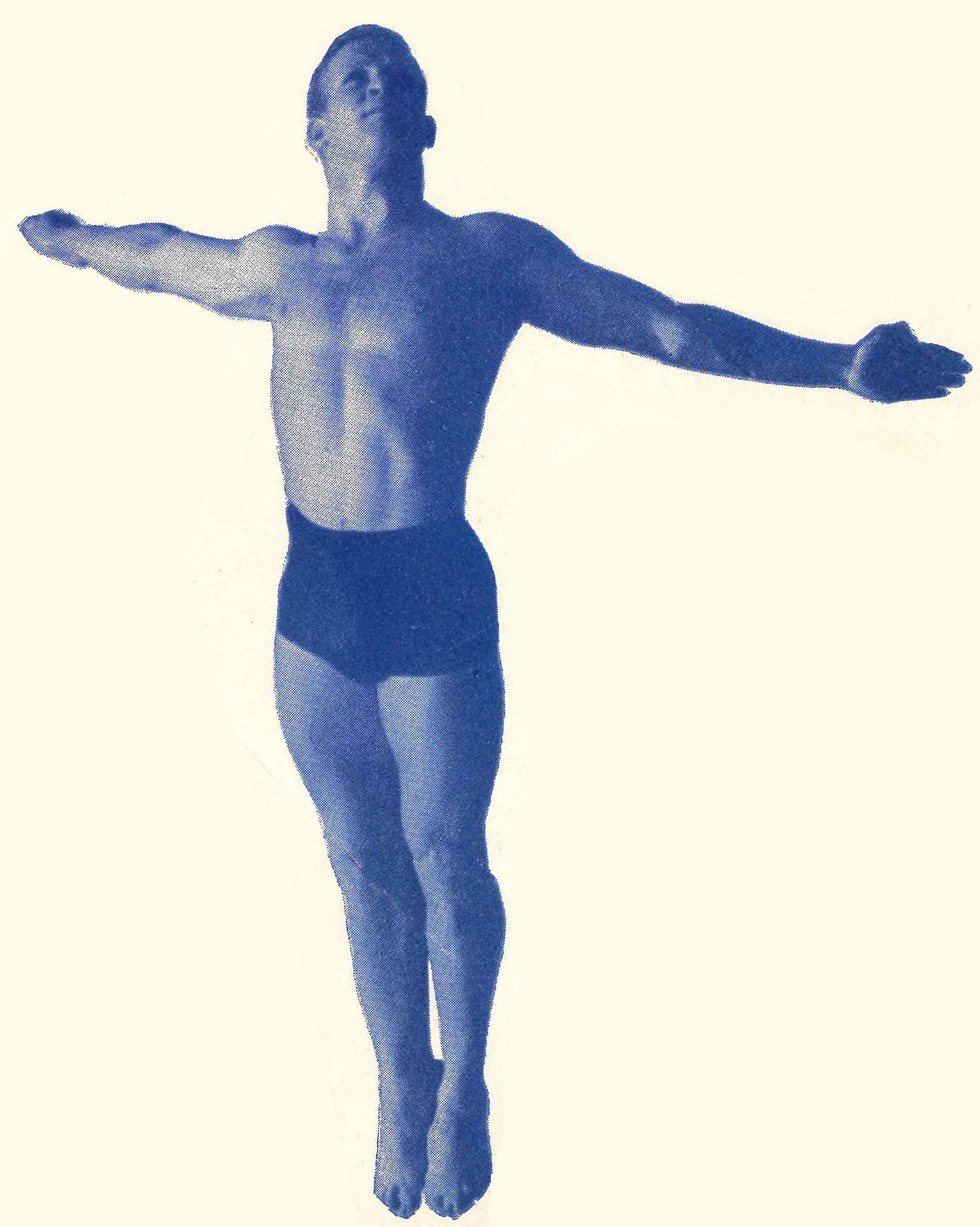
- Bruce Harlan

Personal information
- Full name: Bruce Ira Harlan
- Born: January 2, 1926 Marple Newtown, Pennsylvania, U.S.
- Died: June 22, 1959 (aged 33) Norwalk, Connecticut, U.S.
- Occupation: Diving coach
- Years active: 1945–1959

Sport
- Sport: Diving
- Events: Springboard diving; Platform diving
- University team: Ohio State University

Achievements and titles
- Olympic finals: 1948
Medal record
Men's diving
Representing the United States
Olympic Games
| Gold medal – first place | 1948 London | 3 metre springboard |
| Silver medal – second place | 1948 London | 10 metre platform |
Representing Ohio State
NCAA
| Gold medal – first place | 1948 Ann Arbor | 1 meter diving |
| Gold medal – first place | 1949 Chapel Hill | 1 meter diving |
| Gold medal – first place | 1949 Chapel Hill | 3 meter diving |
| Gold medal – first place | 1950 Columbus | 1 meter diving |
| Gold medal – first place | 1950 Columbus | 3 meter diving |

Bruce Ira Harlan (January 2, 1926 – June 22, 1959) was a diver and Olympic champion from the United States. He represented his native country at the 1948 Summer Olympics in London, where he received one gold medal and one silver medal.

Harlan was a high school wrestler and pole vaulter in Lansdowne, Pennsylvania, and served in the United States Navy during World War II. Harlan coached diving at the University of Michigan from 1954 to 1959. On June 21, 1959, he took part in a diving exhibition in Fairfield, Connecticut. While helping to dismantle the scaffolding of the diving tower, Harlan fell 27 feet (8.2 m) to his death.

In 1961 the Michigan Interscholastic Swim Coaches Association (MISCA) created an award in Harlan's honor. The award is given annually to a diving coach who demonstrates continued leadership, contributions, and service to Michigan high school diving.

Harlan was inducted into the International Swimming Hall of Fame in 1973.

== See also ==
- List of members of the International Swimming Hall of Fame
