= Soichi Sakamoto =

American swimming coach (1906–1997)

Biographical details
- Born: January 23, 1906; Lahaina, Maui County, Hawaii
- Died: August 2, 1997 (aged 91); Honolulu, Hawaii

Coaching career (HC unless noted)
- 1937: "Three Year Swim Club"; Maui, Hawaii
- 1946–1961: University of Hawaiʻi; Honolulu
- 1946–1981: Hawaii Swim Club; Honolulu
- 1952–1956: U.S. Olympic Swim Team; Assistant Coach

Accomplishments and honors

Championships
- 1939-41 3 x AAU National Championships (Three year Swim Club)

Awards
- 1982 International Swim. Hall of Fame; National Collegiate Schol. Swimming Trophy; ASCA Hall of Fame; U. of Hawaii Circle of Honor

Soichi Sakamoto (Japanese: 坂本 正一, January 23, 1906 – August 2, 1997) was an American swimming coach for the Hawaii Swim Club from 1946 through 1981, the University of Hawaii from 1946 through 1961 and the U.S. Olympic team in 1952 and 1956. He pioneered the use of interval and resistance training for competitive swimmers, methods that have now become standard throughout the sport. He coached several national champions and five Olympic medalists that included Bill Woolsey, Thelma Kalama, Evelyn Kawamoto, Bill Smith, and Burwell Jones.

== Early coaching ==
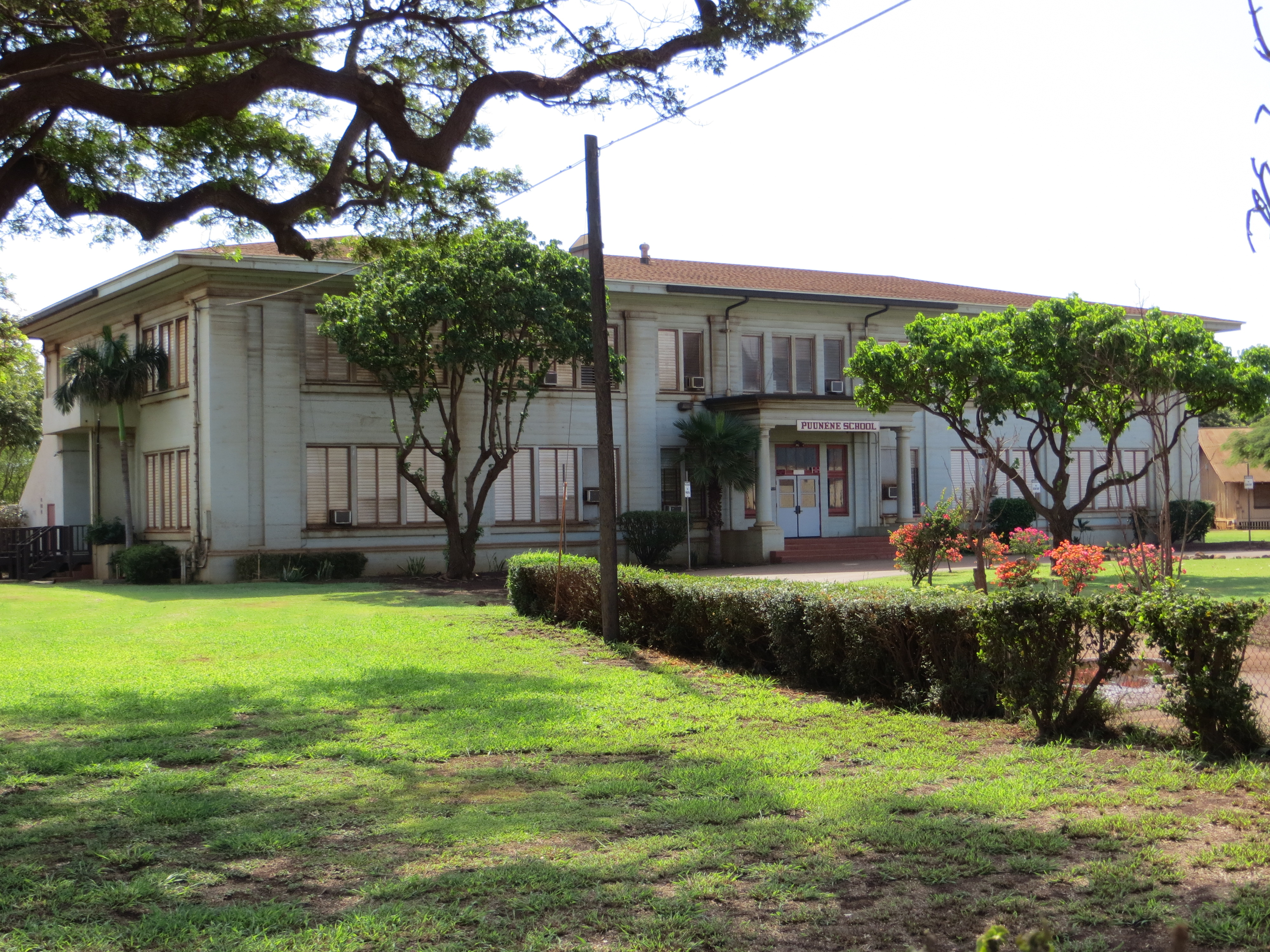
Puunene School

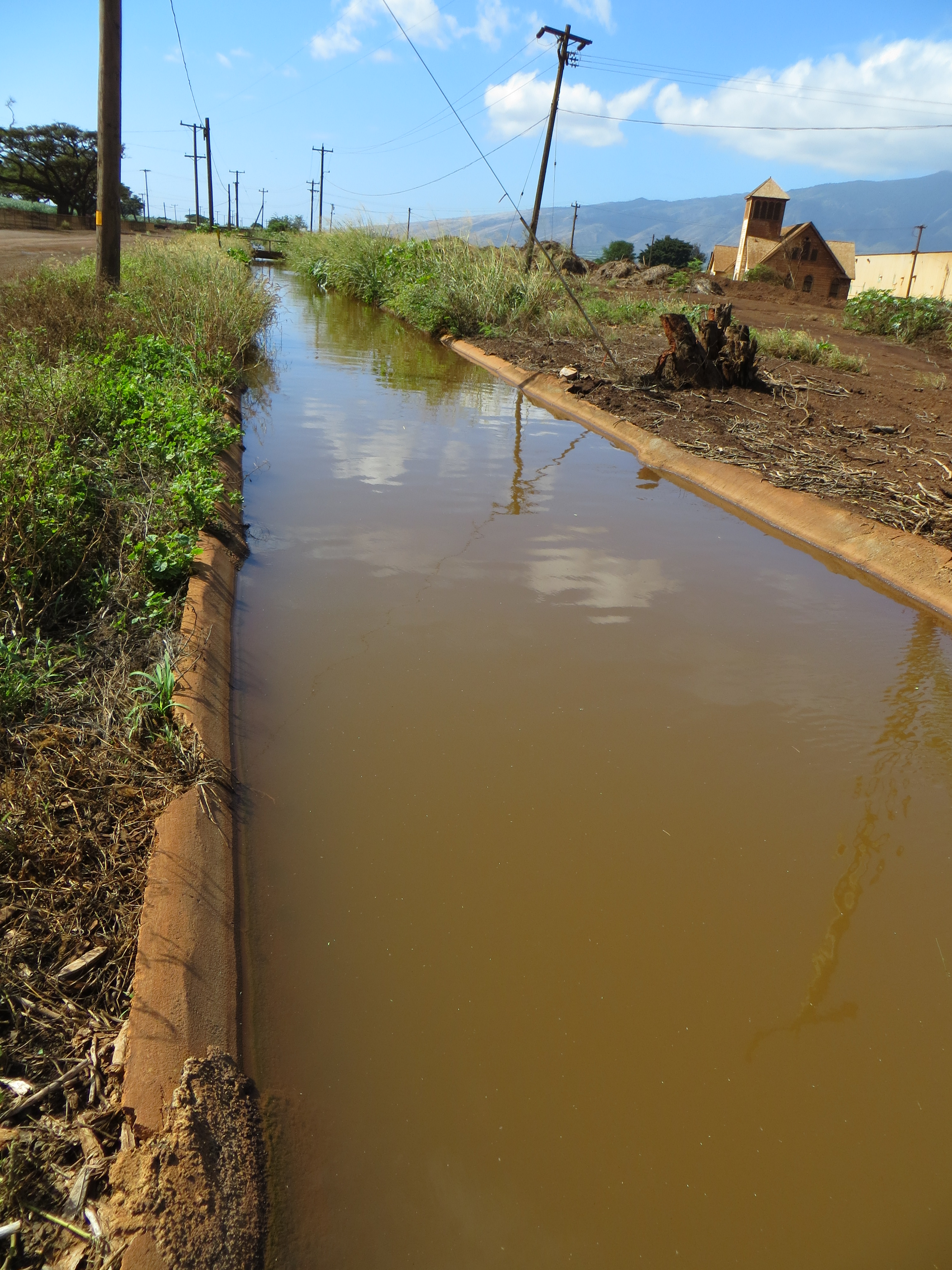
An irrigation ditch (in front of Puunene School) in which Sakamoto's early students trained

Sakamoto was born in the coastal town of Lahaina, to Tokuishi and Shika Sakamoto on January 23, 1906. Lahaina is located on the Western coast of the Island of Maui, in Maui County, Hawaii. Maui County consists of the Islands of Maui and four smaller adjacent islands.

He worked as a sixth-grade science teacher at Puunene School in Maui, Hawaii, and initially knew little about swimming, having confined his early coaching to track and field. As a science teacher and track coach, he learned the value of sprint training in developing cardiovascular fitness and speed for his athletes.

Despite having never worked as a swim coach, in 1937 he established the Three-Year Swim Club in Puunene, Maui, largely for the children of poor sugar plantation workers. Using the skills he had acquired as a track coach, he was one of the first coaches to effectively use interval training for competitive swimmers.

Lacking a pool until 1940, when the club's patron, the Hawaiian Commercial and Sugar Company built one at Baldwin Park, Sakamoto had his early students train in the Hawaiian Sugar Cane Company's irrigation ditches, swimming against the current, a form of resistance training, used to build strength without the use of weights. Jose Balmores, Keo Nakama, "Bunny" Nakama, "Halo" Hirose, and Bill Smith, recalled swimming 50-yard sprints against a current as strong as 15 miles per hour (24 km/h). Sakamoto also had his swimmers cross-train on occasion by running track to improve speed, a form of dryland training. The name of the club, which had a membership as large as 100, reflected Sakamoto's goal of getting his pupils on the Olympic team in three years, and most members signed three-year contracts to diligently pursue their training, while refraining from smoking and drinking. While several of his early students did indeed qualify for the Olympics, the 1940 and 1944 Summer Olympics were cancelled due to World War II. His early teams had great success, despite the Olympic cancellations, and won the 1939, 1940 and 1941 Amateur Athletic Union (AAU) national outdoor team championships.

== Hawaii Swim Club ==
In 1946 he started the Hawaii Swim Club in the greater Honolulu area on the island of Oahu, Northeast of the Island of Maui where he was born and worked as a school teacher. Sakamoto's work days could be grueling, often staying til midnight at the pool after ending his school day teaching around 2:30. He coached the club through 1981, when his wife became ill and he decided to spend time caring for her. It was the club to which he was most dedicated and which he coached for the longest period. He continued coaching the Hawaii Swim Club until the age of 75, when he retired from coaching. By 1958, his Hawaii teams included 14 national AAU titleists. Sakamoto qualified to take twelve teams to the national championships and captured six national AAU team championships. The Hawaii Swim Club still exists, with pool locations in the greater Honolulu area, and continues to host the annual Soichi Sakamoto Invitational swim tournament which began around 1976.

Among numerous championships, as previously mentioned, his women's team with the Hawaii Swim Club won the National Women's AAU Outdoor team championship in August, 1949 in San Antonio, Texas. Individual honors went to future Olympic swimmers Eveleyn Kawamoto who won national titles in breaststroke and IM, and Thelma Kalama, who took titles in the 110 and 440 yard freestyle.

== University of Hawaii ==
He was the swimming coach at the University of Hawaiʻi at Mānoa in Honolulu from 1946 to 1961, where he also coached diving, and during this period served as an assistant coach for the US Olympic Swim Team from 1952 to 1956. Beginning with the 1948 Summer Olympics, Sakamoto achieved his goal; a number of his pupils not only competed in the Olympics, they were medalists. Sakamoto stayed on at the University of Hawaii as an Associate Professor in the Physical Education Department through 1971.

Sakamoto was known to carefully examine the stroke of each of his swimmers individually and build on their strengths, while eliminating any flaws or inefficiencies. What might work for one swimmer, would not work for another. Meticulous in planning detailed strategy, he carefully timed each swimmer's strokes per minute to determine the cadence required to win a particular event.

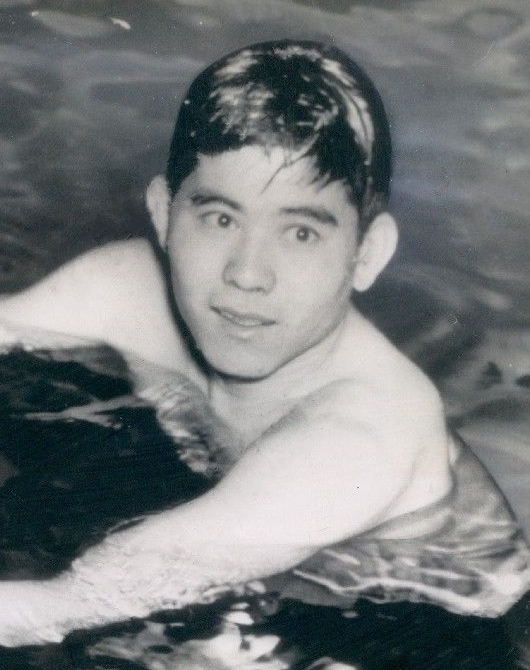
Keo Nakama, 1942

His most outstanding students include:

- Bill Woolsey- a swimmer for McKinley High School and Indiana University, who captured two Olympic medals for the U.S. in the 4x200 free relay, a gold in Helsinki in 1952, and a silver in Melbourne in 1956.
- Takashi "Halo" Hirose - national 100-meter champion in 1941, NCAA champion, and three-time All-American
- Dick Cleveland- triple gold medal winner at the 1951 Pan American games, and a three time National NCAA champion in 1953-54.
- Thelma Kalama - a member of the gold medal winning 1948 Olympics women's 4×100-meter freestyle relay team
- Evelyn Kawamoto - 1949 national champion in the 300-meter individual medley and 200-meter breaststroke, and two-time bronze medalist at the 1952 Olympics
- Keo Nakama - world record holder for the mile, All American swimmer for the University of Ohio, and later a ten year member of the Hawaii State House of Representatives.
- George Onekea - 1956 Olympic competitor in the 400 and 1500 meter freestyle.
- Bill Smith - double gold medalist and team captain at the 1948 London Olympics and world record holder in four events. Smith trained with Sakamoto as early as 1940 in Hawaii, and returned after World War II to train for the 1948 Olympics.
- Burwell Jones - University of Michigan All American, and a 1952 U.S. Olympian who swam in the record breaking preliminaries of the 4x200 relay, later receiving a gold medal despite not being a finalist. He coached Jones primarily as a member of the 1952 Olympic team.

By 1958, early AAU national champions Sakamoto coached included Keo Nakama, Halo Hirose, Fujiko Katsutani, Chic Miyamoto, Bunmei Nakama, and Jose Balmores.

In later life after retirement, Sakamoto suffered from a degree of paralysis on his right side. He died of complications from pneumonia on Oahu, at the age of 90, on August 2, 1997, and was buried in Honolulu. He had been a resident of Honolulu since the mid 1940s. Services were held at Nuuanu Mortuary. He was survived by his wife Mary Poopaa Kalaaupa Sakamoto and four children. His wife Mary had frequently acted as a chaperone when his youth teams traveled.

== Honors ==
He was inducted into the International Swimming Hall of Fame in 1966, Hawaii Sports Hall of Fame and American Swimming Coaches Association Hall of Fame, and is a member of the University of Hawaiʻi Sports Circle of Honor. The Soichi Sakamoto Pool in Wailuku, Maui was named in his honor. In 1957, he was named "Hawaii Sportsman of the Year", formally known as the Vernon McQueen Award. He was presented the award in Honolulu for bringing "world-wide recognition to Hawaii and its athletes."

In October 2015, Julia Checkoway published her book The Three-Year Swim Club: The Untold Story of Maui’s Sugar Ditch Kids and Their Quest for Olympic Glory (Grand Central Publishing, 2015, ISBN 1455523437), a The New York Times bestseller according to Amazon.com.
