= Harry Holiday =

American swimmer

Harry Holiday Jr.
- Holliday at University of Michigan, 1943

Personal information
- National team: United States
- Born: July 2, 1923 Butler, Pennsylvania, U.S.
- Died: February 16, 1999 (aged 75) Boynton Beach, Florida, U.S.
- Height: 6 ft 5 in (1.96 m)

Sport
- Sport: Swimming
- Strokes: Backstroke
- College team: University of Michigan
- Coach: Matthew Mann
Medal record
Representing Michigan
NCAA
Gold medal – first place	1947 Seattle	150-yard backstroke
Gold medal – first place	1947 Seattle	300-yard medley relay
Gold medal – first place	1948 Ann Arbor	300-yard medley relay

Harry Holiday, Jr. (July 2, 1923 – February 16, 1999) was an American swimmer. He was the world record holder in the backstroke at the University of Michigan in the 1940s and the president of steelmaker American Rolling Mill Co. (Armco) from 1974 to 1986.

Holiday was the NCAA backstroke champion in 1943 and 1947, won six NCAA swimming championships, and set seven world records and 18 American records. He missed the opportunity to compete in the Olympic games which were cancelled in 1940 and 1944 due to World War II. He was inducted into the University of Michigan Athletic Hall of Honor in 1981 and the International Swimming Hall of Fame in 1990.

He worked for Armco from 1949 until his retirement in 1986. He was the company's president from 1974 to 1986, adding the title of chief executive officer in 1979 and chairman in 1982.

== Early years ==
A native of Butler, Pennsylvania, Holiday trained with the University of Michigan's Hall of Fame swimming coach Matt Mann, a British Empire Champion swimmer in his youth. While still in high school at Mercersburg Academy, Holiday attended Mann's Camp Chickope for several summers in Northern Ontario, near Burk's Falls, which focused on swimming skills.

=== Mercersburg Academy ===
In February 1941, coached by John Miller, he led the Mercersburg Academy swim team to victory against the Penn State Freshman and set a pool record in the 100-yard backstroke of 1:01.5. As a Senior in March 1941, earning the most creditable time of the meet, he led Mercersburg to their second U.S. Prep School Championship, swimming backstroke in a winning medley trio. Harry received the Vanderberg Trophy in his Senior year at Mercersburg for "exerting the best influence on the swimming team". Equally outstanding in academics, Holiday was one of only ten Mercersburg area preparatory students of the Class of 1941 initiated into the Cum Laude National Honor Society.

== Swimming for Michigan ==
U-M Coach Matt Mann

Holiday enrolled at Michigan in 1941 and became eligible for the varsity swim team in 1943. At the end of 1942, U-M swimming coach Mann predicted that his 18-year-old, 6’ 5” sophomore, Harry Holiday, would break every backstroke record. Mann said, "Holiday is the best the world has ever seen on his back and one of the finest of all time in the free-style." In an exhibition in late 1942, Holiday swam the 100-yard backstroke in 57 seconds, two-tenths of a second under the world record. In the 150-yard backstroke, he swam at 1:33 –- a full second under the NCAA record. In 1940, he finished second in the Canadian two-mile freestyle championship, 30 yards behind the winner, even though he swam backstroke the entire way.

== 1943 swim season ==
In a January 1943 meet against Ohio State, Holiday finished three quarters of a length ahead of the nearest competitor in the 150-yard backstroke with a time of 1:35.9, one second ahead of the conference record. He also broke the world record in the 100-yard backstroke with a time of 57.3 seconds, won the 50-yard freestyle, and swam the winning leg of the 300-yard medley relay.

In early February 1943, Holiday received word that his U.S. Army reserve unit would be called to active duty in June. In a meet against Michigan State in February 1943, he set more records, including an NCAA record for the 150-yard backstroke (1:31.4). He also swam his leg of the 300-yard medley in a time of 56.9, three tenths of a second under the world record.

At the Big Ten meet in March 1943, he swam the 150-yard backstroke in 1:31.7 to set a conference and NCAA mark. He also paced the U-M team to an NCAA record in the 300-yard medley.

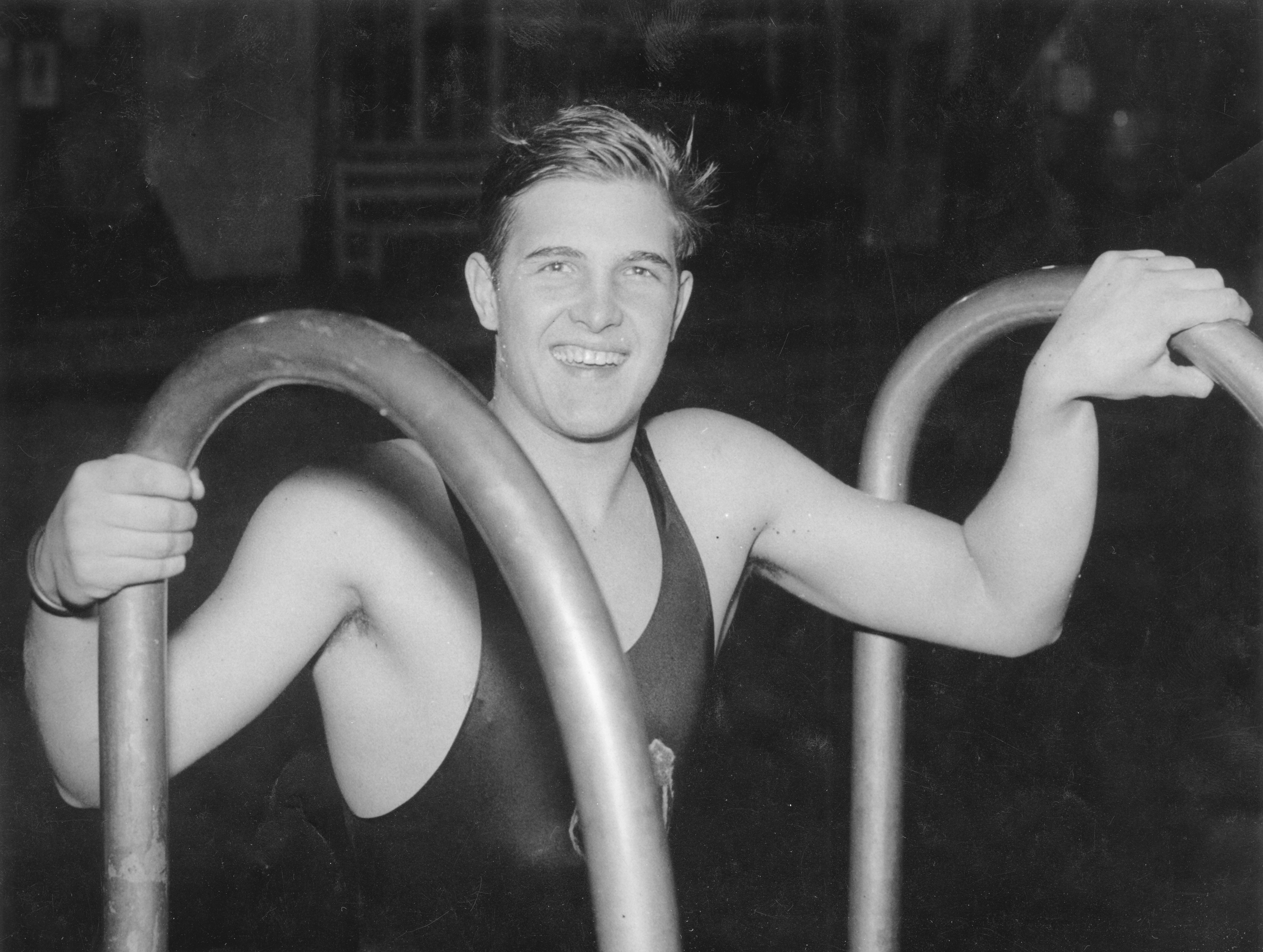
A. Kiefer in 1935

At the National AAU swimming championship in April 1943, Holiday finally went head-to-head with world-record holder Adolph Kiefer. Holiday beat Kiefer in the 150-yard backstroke at the AAU meet. The defeat was the first for Kiefer in eight years.

In his first two months of varsity competition, Holiday broke two of Adolph Kiefer's world records, lowering the 100-yard backstroke mark to 57 seconds and the 200-meter standard to 2:22.9. In August 1943, the NCAA also recognized Holiday as the holder of the new world record in the 150-yard backstroke with a mark of 1:31.5.

Holiday was named as a swimmer to the 1944 Olympic team, but the games were cancelled due to World War II.

== World War II ==
Holiday was called into active duty in the Army, leaving for combat training in Texas in 1943, and served until 1946. He was unable to compete for Michigan swimming in 1944, 1945, or 1946. In June 1946, he competed for the University of Hawaii, setting new Hawaiian records in the 200-yard medley and 150-yard backstroke event.

== 1947 swim season ==
He returned to Michigan in 1947. That year, he set world and American records in the 140-yard individual medley, the 300-meter and 40-yard backstroke events. He was the favorite at the 1947 NCAAs but was forced to withdraw after contracting the flu. As a Senior, Holiday was named captain of the Michigan team and led them to the NCAA National Championship meet held at Ann Arbor. He swam on the winning 300-yard medley relay team, and for the third consecutive year won place on the All-America swimming team.

== Swimming accomplishments ==
Despite losing three years of his U-M swimming career to the war, Holiday set seven world records as a swimmer in the 100-yard backstroke, 200-meter backstroke, 440-yard backstroke, 300-meter individual medley, and in three relay events. He captured six NCAA championships in the 150-yard backstroke, the 100-meter backstroke, and in four relay events. Unrivalled in his mastery of the backstroke for his era, he held 18 American records including the 100-yard backstroke, 150-yard backstroke, 150-meter backstroke, 100-meter backstroke, 200-yard backstroke, 400-yard backstroke, 440-yard backstroke, and nine in relay events. Holiday was an NCAA champion every year he competed for the Wolverines.

== Business career with Armco ==
In 1949, Holiday went to work for steelmaker Armco, Inc. (originally American Rolling Mill Co.), where his father had been a plant manager for many years. Holiday began as an assistant metallurgist in the company's Middletown, Ohio plant, and stayed with the company for 36 years until his retirement.

He was appointed president in 1974, and chief executive officer in May 1979, and added the title of chairman in 1982. Holiday, "known for his optimistic determination, helped lead the steel industry through the boom of the 1960s and the troubled times that followed in the 1970s and 80's." He often called on the federal government to verify that steel imports were legal, and, nearing an economic downturn in 70s, he strove for Armco to diversify its production. In 1984, Holiday had a heart attack, but recovered and returned to his position as Armco's CEO.

Holiday retired from Armco in January 1986 and later served as a director for Adience, Inc., NBD Bank, N.A., ASARCO Incorporated, and Birmingham Steel Corp. In 1998, as Armco fell on hard times, Holiday and the company's other retired executives successfully sued to restore life insurance benefits granted under a plan that was supposed to last their lifetimes.

In February 1999, Holiday died of a heart attack while playing golf in Boynton Beach, Florida. He was survived by his wife of 51 years, Kay Watson Holiday, a daughter, Edith E., two sons, Harry Holiday III, and Albert Holiday. Edith E. Holiday, an attorney and former General Counsel to the Department of the Treasury and later Assistant to the President and Secretary of the Cabinet under George H. W. Bush, is a member of several corporate boards including Heinz, Hess, Franklin Templeton Funds, White Mountain Insurance and Canadian National Railways.

== See also ==
- List of members of the International Swimming Hall of Fame
- University of Michigan Athletic Hall of Honor
