= Takashi Hirose (swimmer) =

American swimmer

Personal information
- Born: 1923
- Died: 2002 (aged 78–79)

Sport
- Sport: Swimming
- Club: Ohio State Buckeyes
- Coach: Soichi Sakamoto

Takashi "Halo" Hirose (Japanese: 廣瀬 隆, 1923–2002) was an American competitive swimmer. In 1937, he joined the famed "Three Year Swim Club" of Soichi Sakamoto. He became the first Japanese American to represent the United States in any international swimming competition, and the first to set a swimming world record. He set that record in 1938 in Germany as a member of the United States's 4 × 100 m freestyle relay team, and also won the National AAU's 800-meter freestyle relay championship in 1941 in record time. He also won the United States National 100m title in 1941.

Hirose was considered a superstar in the 1930s and trained for the Olympics in 1940 and 1944, but was unable to participate due to their cancellation during World War II. He fought in World War II as part of the 442nd Infantry Regiment and the 100th Infantry Battalion, and earned five battle stars, the Combat Infantryman Badge and a Presidential Unit Citation. He was paralyzed for a period from the hips down due to trench foot during a deployment to France in the war; it was feared that he would lose his feet. He was able to recover the use of his legs, but he felt the effects of the disease for the rest of his life.

After the war ended he attended Ohio State University, where he was an All-American three times, was an NCAA champion in the 100 free, and helped Ohio State win Big Ten, NCAA, and AAU team titles. He graduated from Ohio State in 1949. He later became Hawaii's chief probation officer, and eventually retired in 1982.

In 1987, he was inducted into Ohio State University's Sports Hall of Fame. He died in 2002 and was survived by his daughter Sono Hirose-Hulbert and his wife Kiyomi. In 2017, he was inducted into the International Swimming Hall of Fame as a "Pioneer Swimmer".
