= Bill Smith (swimmer) =

American swimmer (1924–2013)

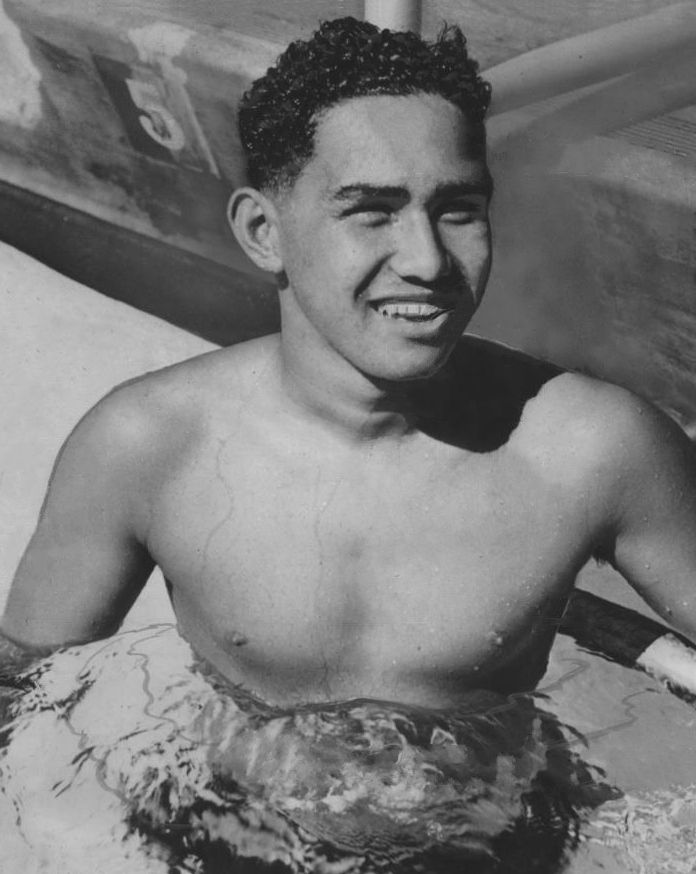
- Smith in 1941

Personal information
- Full name: William Melvin Smith Jr.
- Nickname: "Bill"
- National team: United States
- Born: May 16, 1924 Honolulu, Territory of Hawaii
- Died: February 8, 2013 (aged 88) Honolulu, Hawaii, U.S.

Sport
- Sport: Swimming
- Strokes: Freestyle
- College team: Ohio State University
- Coach: Mike Peppe (Ohio State)
Medal record
Representing the United States
Olympic Games
Gold medal – first place	1948 London	400 m freestyle
Gold medal – first place	1948 London	4×200 m freestyle relay
Representing Ohio State
NCAA
Gold medal – first place	1947 Seattle	220-yard freestyle
Gold medal – first place	1947 Seattle	440-yard freestyle
Gold medal – first place	1947 Seattle	400-yard freestyle relay
Gold medal – first place	1948 Ann Arbor	220-yard freestyle
Gold medal – first place	1948 Ann Arbor	440-yard freestyle
Gold medal – first place	1949 Chapel Hill	220-yard freestyle
Gold medal – first place	1949 Chapel Hill	440-yard freestyle

William Melvin Smith Jr. (May 16, 1924 – February 8, 2013) was an American competitive swimmer, two-time Olympic champion, and a former world record-holder in four events. He was one of the most successful competitive swimmers in the United States in the first half of the 20th century.

Smith was born in Honolulu, Hawaii, of mixed Irish and Native Hawaiian ancestry. He attended Ohio State University under Hall of Fame Coach Mike Peppe, and competed for the Ohio State Buckeyes swimming and diving team within the National Collegiate Athletic Association (NCAA). As a college swimmer, he was undefeated in three years of dual meet competition, and was a four-time All-American. He set seven world records and won fourteen U.S. national championships: seven NCAA, six AAU indoor and one AAU outdoor.

At the 1948 Summer Olympics in London, England, Smith won gold medals in the 400-meter freestyle and 4×200-meter freestyle relay. At one time, Smith held all of the world records in freestyle swimming events between 200 and 1,000 meters.

At the US Olympic trials of the 1948 4x200-meter freestyle relay, several swimmers who had already qualified in other events slowed down in their heats or swam fast in the prelims and scratched themselves for the final to allow more swimmers to qualify for the US Olympic Team. Smith was one of the instigators of this "conspiracy".

Ultimately, coach Robert Kiphuth did hold a time trial shortly after the actual trials with eleven of the swimmers. This time trial had Jimmy McLane as first overall with a time of 2:11.0, Bill Smith, and Wally Wolf in 2:11.2, and Wally Ris in 2:12.4. This quartet was used for the Olympic final and won the gold medal. The next four-Eugene Rogers in 2:14.2, Edwin Gilbert in 2:15.4, Robert Gibe in 2:15.6, and William Dudley in 2:15.9, were used in the Olympic prelims. The next three swimmers-Joe Verdeur who came in 2:16.3, Alan Ford in 2;16.4 and George Hoogerhyde in 2:17.4 were not used in any capacity in the 4x200 freestyle relay.

After retiring from competitions Smith became captain of the surf guards at Waikiki Beach, coached swimmers at the University of Hawaii, and served as safety director for the Honolulu Department of Parks and Recreation for 25 years. He also coached masters swimmers at the Kamehameha Swim Club.

Smith was inducted into the International Swimming Hall of Fame in 1966. In 2001 he was named Ohio State University's swimmer of the century by the Columbus Touchdown Club. He died February 8, 2013; he was 88 years old.

== See also ==
- List of members of the International Swimming Hall of Fame
- List of Ohio State University people
- List of Olympic medalists in swimming (men)
- World record progression 200 metres freestyle
- World record progression 400 metres freestyle
- World record progression 800 metres freestyle
- World record progression 4 × 200 metres freestyle relay

Records
Preceded by Jack Medica	Men's 400-meter freestyle world record-holder (long course); May 13, 1941 – September 12, 1947	Succeeded by Alexandre Jany
Preceded by Shozo Makino	Men's 800-meter freestyle world record-holder (long course); July 24, 1941 – June 26, 1949	Succeeded by Hironoshin Furuhashi
Preceded by Jack Medica	Men's 200-meter freestyle world record-holder (long course); February 12, 1944 – September 20, 1946	Succeeded by Alexandre Jany
