= Diving at the 1952 Summer Olympics – Women's 3 metre springboard =

Women's 3 metre springboard at the Games of the XV Olympiad

Medalists
1st place, gold medalist(s)		Pat McCormick	United States
2nd place, silver medalist(s)		Madeleine Moreau	France
3rd place, bronze medalist(s)		Zoe Ann Olsen-Jensen	United States

The women's 3 metre springboard, also reported as springboard diving, was one of four diving events on the Diving at the 1952 Summer Olympics programme.

The competition was split into two phases held on different days:

- Preliminary round (29 July) – Divers performed five voluntary dives of limited degrees of difficulty. The eight divers with the highest scores advanced to the final.
- Final (30 July) – Divers performed five voluntary dives without any limits of difficulty. The final score was the aggregate of the preliminary and final rounds' points.

== Results ==
Rank	Diver	Nation	Preliminary		Final		
Rank	Diver	Nation	Points	Rank	Points	Rank	Total
1st place, gold medalist(s)	Pat McCormick	United States	71.85	1	75.45	1	147.30
2nd place, silver medalist(s)	Madeleine Moreau	France	67.65	2	71.69	3	139.34
3rd place, bronze medalist(s)	Zoe Ann Olsen-Jensen	United States	54.09	8	73.48	2	127.57
4	Ninel Krutova	Soviet Union	56.18	4	60.68	4	116.86
5	Charmain Welsh	Great Britain	59.14	3	57.24	6	116.38
6	Lyubov Shigalova	Soviet Union	54.18	7	59.65	5	113.83
7	Nicolle Pellissard	France	55.69	5	56.29	7	111.98
8	Ann Long	Great Britain	54.82	6	54.00	8	108.82
9	Carol Frick	United States	52.97	9	did not advance		
10	Valentina Chumicheva	Soviet Union	52.15	10	did not advance		
11	Dorothy Drew	Great Britain	51.28	11	did not advance		
12	Hendrina van den Horn	Netherlands	49.44	12	did not advance		
13	Anna-Stina Wahlberg	Sweden	48.47	13	did not advance		
14	Helena Lanting-Keller	Netherlands	47.33	14	did not advance		
15	Masami Miyamoto	Japan	46.88	15	did not advance		

== Sources ==
- The Organising Committee for the XV Olympiad Helsinki 1952 (1955). "The Official Report of the Organising Committee for the XV Olympiad Helsinki 1952" (PDF). The Organising Committee for the XV Olympiad Helsinki 1952. pp. p. 598. Archived from the original (pdf) on 11 April 2008.
- Herman de Wael (9 October 2002). "Diving - women's springboard (Helsinki 1952)".
