= Diving at the 1948 Summer Olympics – Women's 3 metre springboard =

Women's 3 metre springboard at the Games of the XIV Olympiad

Medalists
1st place, gold medalist(s)		Vicki Draves	United States
2nd place, silver medalist(s)		Zoe Ann Olsen	United States
3rd place, bronze medalist(s)		Patsy Elsener	United States

The women's 3 metre springboard, also reported as springboard diving, was one of four diving events on the diving at the 1948 Summer Olympics programme.

The competition was held on Saturday 31 July, on Monday 2 August, and on Tuesday 3 August. It was split into two sets of dives:

1. Compulsory dives
  Divers performed four pre-chosen dives (from different categories) – a running straight header forward, backward header with pike, running straight isander-half gainer reverse dive, and backward spring and forward dive with pike.
2. Facultative dives
  Divers performed four dives of their choice (from different categories and different from the compulsory).

Sixteen divers from eight nations competed.

== Results ==
Rank	Diver	Nation	Points
1st place, gold medalist(s)	Vicki Draves	United States	108.74
2nd place, silver medalist(s)	Zoe Ann Olsen-Jensen	United States	108.23
3rd place, bronze medalist(s)	Patsy Elsener	United States	101.30
4	Nicole Péllissard-Darrigrand	France	100.38
5	Gudrun Grömer	Austria	93.30
6	Edna Child	Great Britain	91.63
7	Mady Moreau	France	89.43
8	Kiki Heck	Netherlands	87.61
9	Birte Christoffersen	Denmark	87.12
10	Jeannette Aubert	France	86.96
11	Alma Staudinger	Austria	86.93
12	Cobie Floor	Netherlands	83.14
13	Esme Harris	Great Britain	74.10
14	Kay Cuthbert	Great Britain	72.40
15	Inger Nordbø	Norway	70.86
16	Ibone Belausteguigoitia	Mexico	58.18

== Sources ==
- Organising Committee for the XIV Olympiad London 1948 (1951). "The Official Report of the Organising Committee for the XIV Olympiad London 1948" (pdf). Organising Committee for the XIV Olympiad London 1948. pp. pp.637–9.
- Herman de Wael (9 October 2002). "Diving - women's springboard (London 1948)".
