= Conter =

Conter is a surname. Notable people with the surname include:

- Laura Conter (born 1934), Italian diver
- Lou Conter (1921–2024), American Navy Lieutenant commander
- Stephan Conter (born 1965), Belgian horse breeder

== See also ==
- Contern
