= Cobie Floor =

Dutch diver (1930–2017)

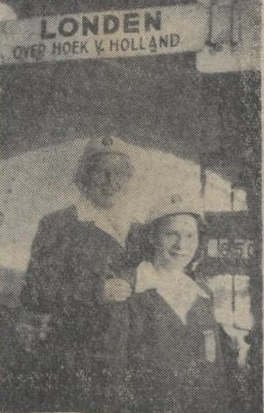
- Floor (right) at the 1948 Summer Olympics

Personal information
- Full name: Jacoba Georgina Bernarda "Cobie" Floor (-van Daatselaar)
- Nationality: Dutch
- Born: 20 May 1930; Amsterdam, Netherlands
- Died: 25 April 2017 (aged 86); Amsterdam, Netherlands

Sport
- Sport: Diving
- Club: ADZ, Amsterdam

Jacoba Georgina Bernarda "Cobie" Floor (-van Daatselaar) first name also written as Coby (20 May 1930 – 25 April 2017) was a Dutch diver. She was trained by trainer Bosch.

Floor made her debut at the Dutch championships in 1943 and finished fourth. She classified second in second in 1944 and won the title in 1946 and 1947. Because of her achievements, she was selected by the KNZB to participate at the 1947 European Championships in Monaco. At these championships she finished sixth.

She finished second during an international competition in March 1948. Floor won the silver medal at the national championships in 1948 behind Kiki Heck. Both would represent the Netherlands a few weeks later at the 1948 Summer Olympics. She competed in the women's 3 metre springboard event at the 1948 Summer Olympics. She did not perform well during the first series of four compulsory dives. According to the newspaper she did not seem to be rested. She was ranked 12th after the four compulsory jumps, and would stay 12th after the four facultative dives.

She won the silver medal at the national championships in 1950 behind Leni Lanting-Keller. Floor married swimmer Rinus van Daatselaar. She died in 2017.
