= Diving at the 1948 Summer Olympics =

Coordinates: 51.5581°N 0.2830°W

Diving at the Games of the XIV Olympiad
- Venue: Wembley Arena
- Dates: 30 July 1948 through 5 August 1948
- No. of events: 4
- Competitors: 63 from 22 nations

At the 1948 Summer Olympics in London, four diving events were contested. The competitions were held from Friday 30 July 1948 to Friday 6 August 1948.

== Medal summary ==
The events are labelled as 3 metre springboard and 10 metre platform by the International Olympic Committee, and appeared on the 1948 Official Report as springboard diving and highboard diving, respectively.

=== Men ===
| Event | Gold | Silver | Bronze |
|---|---|---|---|
| 3 m springboard | Bruce Harlan; United States | Miller Anderson; United States | Sammy Lee; United States |
| 10 m platform | Sammy Lee; United States | Bruce Harlan; United States | Joaquín Capilla; Mexico |

=== Women ===
| Event | Gold | Silver | Bronze |
|---|---|---|---|
| 3 m springboard | Vicki Draves; United States | Zoe Ann Olsen; United States | Patsy Elsener; United States |
| 10 m platform | Vicki Draves; United States | Patsy Elsener; United States | Birte Christoffersen; Denmark |

== Participating nations ==
- Australia (1)
- Austria (4)
- Brazil (3)
- Canada (2)
- Chile (1)
- Cuba (1)
- Denmark (3)
- Egypt (4)
- Finland (1)
- France (5)
- Great Britain (11)
- Hungary (1)
- Ireland (1)
- Mexico (4)
- Netherlands (2)
- Norway (2)
- South Africa (1)
- Syria (1)
- Sweden (3)
- Switzerland (2)
- United States (7)

== Medal table ==
| Rank | Nation | Gold | Silver | Bronze | Total |
|---|---|---|---|---|---|
| 1 | United States | 4 | 4 | 2 | 10 |
| 2 | Denmark | 0 | 0 | 1 | 1 |
| 2 | Mexico | 0 | 0 | 1 | 1 |
| Totals (3 entries) | | 4 | 4 | 4 | 12 |
