= Diving at the 1948 Summer Olympics – Women's 10 metre platform =

Women's 10 metre platform at the Games of the XIV Olympiad

Medalists
1st place, gold medalist(s)		Vicki Draves	United States
2nd place, silver medalist(s)		Patsy Elsener	United States
3rd place, bronze medalist(s)		Birte Christoffersen	Denmark

The women's 10 metre platform, also reported as highboard diving, was one of four diving events on the diving at the 1948 Summer Olympics programme.

The competition, held on Friday 6 August, was held from both 10 and 5 metre platforms and was split into two sets of dives:

1. Compulsory dives
  Divers performed four pre-chosen dives (from different categories) – a running one-and-half somersault forward with pike, straight somersault backward (5 metre), standing straight header forward, and running straight header forward (10 metre).
2. Facultative dives
  Divers performed two dives of their choice (from different categories and different from the compulsory).

Fifteen divers from nine nations competed.

== Results ==
Rank	Diver	Nation	Points
1st place, gold medalist(s)	Vicki Draves	United States	68.87
2nd place, silver medalist(s)	Patsy Elsener	United States	66.28
3rd place, bronze medalist(s)	Birte Christoffersen	Denmark	66.04
4	Alma Staudinger	Austria	64.59
5	Juno Stover-Irwin	United States	62.63
6	Nicolle Péllissard	France	61.07
7	Eva Petersén	Sweden	59.86
8	Inge Beeken	Denmark	59.54
9	Irén Zságot	Hungary	56.62
10	Margaret Bisbrown	Great Britain	53.95
11	Denise Newman	Great Britain	53.50
12	Maire Hider	Great Britain	52.31
13	Inger Nordbø	Norway	51.55
14	Rosa Gutiérrez	Mexico	41.88
—	Gudrun Grömer	Austria	(39.65)

Gudrun Grömer did not finish the competition.

== Sources ==
- www.sports-reference.com
- Organising Committee for the XIV Olympiad London 1948 (1951). "The Official Report of the Organising Committee for the XIV Olympiad London 1948" (pdf). Organising Committee for the XIV Olympiad London 1948. pp. pp.637–9.
- Herman de Wael (7 August 2001). "Diving – women's platform (London 1948)".
