= Dorothy Drew (diver) =

British diver

Personal information
- Full name: Dorothy Ann Drew
- Nationality: British
- Born: 2 November 1934 Dera Ismail Khan, Pakistan
- Died: 1 May 2001 (aged 66) Cirencester, England

Sport
- Sport: Diving

Dorothy Ann Drew (2 November 1934 – 1 May 2001) was a British diver. She competed in the women's 3 metre springboard event at the 1952 Summer Olympics.

== Early life ==
She lived at 'Hainton' on Station Road in New Waltham, south of Grimsby, when her family returned to England in January 1947. She was the daughter of Lt-Col Drew of the 2nd King Edward VII's Own Gurkha Rifles (The Sirmoor Rifles), one of seven children. She attended Waltham Toll Bar Secondary Modern School from 1947 to 1949.

Her father moved to 8 Croysdale Avenue, in Sunbury-on-Thames in February 1949, and she trained with Jack Beasley, the British Olympic team coach. She was head girl of Clarke's College in Surbiton.

== Sport ==
She was picked for 1952 Olympics, when she trained in Heston, with Kay Cuthbert. She was placed eleventh in the 1952 Olympics.
