= Harvey Cartwright =

English association footballer

Personal information
- Full name: Harvey Jay Cartwright
- Date of birth: 9 May 2002 (age 24)
- Place of birth: Grimsby, England
- Height: 6 ft 4 in (1.93 m)
- Position: Goalkeeper

Team information
- Current team: Grimsby Town (on loan from Hull City)
- Number: 1

Youth career
- Grimsby Town
- 2015–2019: Hull City

Senior career*
Years	Team	Apps	(Gls)
2019–	Hull City	2	(0)
2019	→ Barton Town (loan)	10	(0)
2021	→ Gainsborough Trinity (loan)	6	(0)
2022–2023	→ Peterborough United (loan)	0	(0)
2023	→ Wycombe Wanderers (loan)	1	(0)
2023–2024	→ Grimsby Town (loan)	25	(0)
2025	→ Hartlepool United (loan)	13	(0)
2026–	→ Grimsby Town (loan)	0	(0)

International career^{‡}
2019	England U18	1	(0)
2022	England U20	1	(0)
- * Club domestic league appearances and goals as of 13:34, 9 May 2026 (UTC) ‡ National team caps and goals as of 12:59, 26 March 2022 (UTC)

Harvey Jay Cartwright (born 9 May 2002) is an English professional footballer who plays as a goalkeeper for EFL League Two side Grimsby Town, on loan from Premier League club Hull City.

Coming through the youth academies of Grimsby Town and Hull City. He turned professional for City in 2019. He has since spent time on loan with Barton Town, Gainsborough Trinity, Peterborough United and Wycombe Wanderers. He is a former England U18 and England U20 international.

== Club career ==
=== Hull City ===
Cartwright was initially a youth product of Grimsby Town's academy before joining Hull City. He had a short loan with Barton Town in 2019, with 10 appearances for the club. Returning to Hull City, he made his first senior appearance with the club in a 2–1 EFL Trophy loss to Leicester City U21s in September 2020. He then joined Gainsborough Trinity on a one-month loan in the Northern Premier League, keeping four clean sheets in 6 undefeated outings with the club.

He signed his first professional contract with Hull City on 2 February 2021. He made his professional debut with Hull City in a 1–1 EFL Championship tie with Queens Park Rangers on 19 February 2022, coming on as a substitute in the 66th minute after a horror injury to the starting goalkeeper Matt Ingram.

On 25 May 2022, Cartwright signed a four-year contract with Hull City.

==== Peterborough and Wycombe loans ====
On 17 June 2022, Cartwright agreed a season-long loan deal for the 2022–23 season with Peterborough United under former Hull City manager Grant McCann. On 16 January 2023, Cartwright's loan at Peterborough United was cut short.

On 26 January 2023, Cartwright joined Wycombe Wanderers on loan until the end of the 2022–23 season. Cartwright would go on to make one appearance for Wycombe, a 3–0 defeat to Cheltenham Town.

==== Grimsby Town (loan) ====
On 4 July 2023, Cartwright returned to his hometown club, signing a season-long loan deal for Grimsby Town. He stated upon his arrival "I'm really happy to be here. It's an area I know very well and I've been a massive fan of the club since I was a kid and this is something I've dreamed of from when I was a young fan. He missed the final six matches of the season due to injury but made 32 appearances in total, keeping 6 clean sheets. Cartwright was awarded the Young Player of the Year award during his season at Grimsby.

==== Hartlepool United (loan) ====
On 7 August 2025, Cartwright signed for Hartlepool United on a season-long loan deal. He made his debut for Hartlepool two days later, keeping a clean sheet in a 0–0 away draw at Yeovil Town. He saved a penalty in the following match in a 2–0 home win against Braintree Town. After an impressive start to the season, Cartwright was nominated for the National League Player of the Month award for August. Having been forced off with an injury on 1 October, his loan was terminated to allow him to return to his parent club for treatment.

==== Return to Grimsby on loan ====
In June 2026, Hull triggered a one-year extension to Cartwright's contract.

On 28 July 2026, Cartwright returned to Grimsby Town on another season-long loan. He was brought back with the intention of being the club's first-choice goalkeeper and was allocated the number 1 shirt, while Christy Pym, who had been made available for transfer at the end of the previous season, was given number 31.

Cartwright suffered an injury before Grimsby's opening competitive fixture of the season, resulting in Pym starting in goal during his absence. He made his second competitive debut for the club on 22 September, starting against Notts County in the EFL Trophy and playing the first half of the 2–1 defeat before being replaced by Seb Auton.

By the time Cartwright returned, Pym had recovered from an injury of his own and had regained the League Two starting position. Cartwright completed his first full match since returning in a goalless EFL Trophy draw with Burton Albion on 6 October, but Pym continued to be selected for the club's league fixtures, with Cartwright named among the substitutes.

== International career ==
Cartwright is a youth international for England, having played for the England U18 in a friendly 3–2 win over the Austria U18s on 16 October 2019, coming on as a sub at half-time.

On 25 March 2022, Cartwright made his U20 debut in a 2–0 defeat to Poland in Bielsko-Biała.

== Personal life ==
Cartwright is a Grimsby Town supporter.

== Career statistics ==
As of match played 31 October 2025

Appearances and goals by club, season and competition
Club	Season	League			FA Cup		League Cup		Other		Total	
Club	Season	Division	Apps	Goals	Apps	Goals	Apps	Goals	Apps	Goals	Apps	Goals
Hull City	2020–21	League One	0	0	0	0	0	0	1 (Note: Appearance(s) in EFL Trophy)	0	1	0
Hull City	2021–22	Championship	2	0	0	0	0	0	—		2	0
Hull City	Total		2	0	0	0	0	0	1	0	3	0
Gainsborough Trinity (loan)	2021–22	Northern Premier League Premier Division	6	0	0	0	—		0	0	6	0
Peterborough United (loan)	2022–23	League One	0	0	0	0	0	0	1	0	1	0
Wycombe Wanderers (loan)	2022–23	League One	1	0	0	0	0	0	0	0	1	0
Grimsby Town (loan)	2023–24	League Two	25	0	3	0	1	0	3	0	32	0
Hartlepool United (loan)	2025–26	National League	13	0	0	0	—		—		13	0
Grimsby Town (loan)	2026–27	League Two	0	0	0	0	0	0	2	0	2	0
Career total			47	0	3	0	1	0	7	0	58	0

== Honours ==
Individual

- Grimsby Town Young Player of the Year: 2023–24
