= Edwin Essel =

English footballer

Personal information
- Date of birth: 11 April 2004 (age 22)
- Place of birth: Grimsby, England
- Position: Striker

Team information
- Current team: Grimsby Borough

Youth career
- 2015–2021: Grimsby Town

Senior career*
| Years | Team | Apps | (Gls) |
| 2021–2024 | Grimsby Town | 2 | (0) |
| 2022–2023 | → Grimsby Borough (loan) | 10 | (4) |
| 2023 | → Cleethorpes Town (loan) | 7 | (2) |
| 2023 | → Guiseley (loan) | 1 | (0) |
| 2023 | → Grimsby Borough (loan) | 13 | (5) |
| 2024–2025 | Gainsborough Trinity | 0 | (0) |
| 2025– | Grimsby Borough | 0 | (0) |
- * Club domestic league appearances and goals as of 15:28, 30 April 2024 (UTC)

Edwin Essel (born 11 March 2004) is an English professional footballer who plays as a striker for Grimsby Borough

== Career ==
=== Grimsby Town ===
Essel joined the Grimsby Town youth academy at the Under 10's level. He was promoted to the first team by Paul Hurst at the beginning of the 2021–22 season due to a shortage of fit strikers, and made his full professional debut on 4 September 2021 in a 4–3 victory over Barnet, coming on as an 80th minute substitute for Will Bapaga. The following week he came on as an 89th minute replacement for John McAtee in a 3–1 win at Torquay United, later appearing in an FA Cup tie with Bromsgrove Sporting.

Grimsby secured promotion with victory in the play-off final, though Essel was not in the matchday squad at London Stadium.

In April 2022, Essel signed his first professional contract with the club. On 4 October 2022, Essel joined non-league side Grimsby Borough on loan. On 11 January 2023, the loan was extended until the end of the 2022–23 season.

In late January he was recalled due to a player shortage and was named as a substitute in a 2–2 draw away at Luton Town in the fourth round of the FA Cup. On 8 February 2023, Essel made his first appearance of the season as he came on as a late substitute for Danilo Orsi in Grimsby's 3–0 win over Luton in the resulting replay.

On 24 March 2023, Essel signed for Cleethorpes Town on loan for the remainder of the season.

On 18 August 2023, Essel signed for Northern Premier League side Guiseley on a one-month loan.

Essel returned to Grimsby Borough on 16 September 2023, signing a loan deal until January 2024.

Following the conclusion of the 2023–24 season, Essel departed the club on a free transfer.

=== Non-league ===
Essel joined Gainsborough Trinity in July 2024 after a successful trial. a

In February 2025, Essel re-signed for Grimsby Borough.

== Personal life ==
Essel attended Tollbar Academy in Grimsby.
