= Waltham Toll Bar Academy =

Waltham Tollbar Academy

Location
- Station Road, New Waltham; Grimsby, North East Lincolnshire, DN36 4RZ; England; 53°31′17″N 0°04′44″W

Information
- Type: Academy
- Motto: "Aspire, Endeavour, Excel"
- Religious affiliation: none
- Established: 18 October 1937
- Department for Education URN: 136268 Tables
- Ofsted: Reports
- Chair of Governors: Phillip Bond
- Principal: Philip Dickinson
- Staff: 65
- Gender: N/A
- Age: 11 to 18
- Enrolment: 2,000
- Houses: Tucana, Lyra, Indus, Perseus, Vela, Orion
- Website: http://www.tollbaracademy.co.uk/

Waltham Toll Bar Academy is a co-educational secondary school and sixth form, in New Waltham, North East Lincolnshire, England.

== Admissions ==
A secondary school with a sixth form, the academy serves 11- to 18-year-olds. The largest school in North East Lincolnshire, it has around 2,000 pupils. The College lies on the border of North East Lincolnshire and Lincolnshire (East Lindsey), and is 2.5 miles (4.0 km) south of Grimsby. Students come from Grimsby, Cleethorpes, and surrounding Lincolnshire villages.

== History ==
The original school was opened in 1937 for 385 pupils. It opened on Monday 6 September 1937 as Waltham Toll Bar Senior School, for Waltham, Humberston, Holton-le-Clay, Laceby, North Thoresby, Tetney and Hatcliffe. The building cost £21,910, with twelve teachers.

It was officially opened on Monday 18 October 1937 by Lord Heneage. Headmaster Charles Brears was the former headmaster of Sibsey Free School from 1928, and at Great Limber before. He had been an officer in the Royal Flying Corps, with 30 Squadron in Mesopotamia. Mr Brears originated from Kirton in Lindsey, and was head boy at Gainsborough Grammar School. He retired in December 1952, having been history teacher from 1945 at Gleed Boys' School, and died in May 1968, aged 75.

It became the Tollbar Secondary Modern School, around 1945. James Harold Drury was the headmaster from 1945, who lived at 'Southlands' at Barnoldby le Beck. He attended Sir William Turner's Grammar School in Coatham, and the University of Manchester. He collapsed and died at his home on Wednesday 26 December 1956, when aged 47. He had been off work for six months, with illness.

Ted Kirkby was headmaster from April 1957, who lived at 87 Brigsley Road in Waltham. In 1958 Kirkby believed that formation of comprehensive schools 'would not create more chances for children', and he believed in the value of secondary modern schools, and urged parents to have faith in such schools, which not all did, and that parents viewing such schools as for '11-plus failures' was 'arrant nonsense'. 55 year old Mr Kirkby, originally from Alford, was appointed the head of the new comprehensive school, to open in 1971. Mr Kirkby retired in July 1974.

Ken Drake was headmaster from 1974, and David Hampson was headmaster from May 1990. Further expansion occurred in the 1970s, and has continued.

It is situated on the junction of the A16 and B1219. The school later became Tollbar Business and Enterprise College, changing to Tollbar Business, Enterprise and Humanities College in 2008/9. In autumn 2010 the school gained Academy status, once again changing its name to Tollbar Academy. It was one of the first to change to an Academy under the new legislation as implemented by the 2010 Coalition government.

== Academic performance ==
In July 2002, it was awarded Business and Enterprise College status. In September 2004, it was awarded foundation school status. In October of the same year it announced that it was going to introduce a 5 term year. The sixth form is a partnership with Grimsby Institute of Further & Higher Education. It gets the best GCSE results in North East Lincolnshire LEA, and the best A level results followed by Franklin College.

In May 2008, Principal David Hampson suspended 74 pupils for using the school computers to play a game based on the film Tron. The game was downloaded by students. The school also forbids mobile phones or any other electronic equipment.

In September 2012, the academy was ranked number 1 in the government "Similar Schools" table, which ranks schools by results against schools with a similar intake.

As of 2023, the school's most recent inspection by Ofsted was in 2013, when it was judged Outstanding. It was one of only two secondary schools in North-East Lincolnshire to receive the highest category of inspection judgement under the new, more rigorous, inspection standards.

== Notable former pupils ==
- Angela Smith, Change UK MP for Sheffield Hillsborough
- Jason Stockwood, businessman and Chairman of Grimsby Town
- Edwin Essel, footballer

=== Toll Bar Secondary Modern School ===
- Dorothy Drew (diver) (from 1947 to 1949, then moved to south-west London), competed in the 1952 Summer Olympics

== Notable teachers ==
- Amy Gowshall head of PE.
