= Jamie Bramwell =

English footballer

Personal information
- Date of birth: 25 January 2004 (age 22)
- Place of birth: Newcastle upon Tyne, England
- Position: Defender

Team information
- Current team: Cleethorpes Town

Youth career
- 2015–2020: Newcastle United
- 2020–2022: Grimsby Town

Senior career*
Years	Team	Apps	(Gls)
2022–2024	Grimsby Town	4	(0)
2022	→ Whitby Town (loan)	15	(0)
2023	→ Gainsborough Trinity (loan)	4	(0)
2023	→ Whitby Town (loan)	7	(0)
2024–2025	Gateshead	6	(1)
2024–2025	→ South Shields (loan)	19	(0)
2025–2026	Stockton Town	43	(3)
2026-	Cleethorpes Town	21	(1)
- * Club domestic league appearances and goals as of 09:19, 23 April 2025 (UTC)

Jamie Bramwell (born 25 January 2004) is an English professional footballer who plays as a defender for Northern Premier League club Cleethorpes Town

== Career ==
=== Grimsby Town ===
Bramwell moved to Grimsby Town's youth academy in 2020 having played for the academy of Premier League side Newcastle United. In April 2022, Bramwell signed his first professional contract with the club.

He made his full professional debut in a 4–4 draw away at Eastleigh on 15 May 2022, playing the full 90 minutes. Grimsby secured promotion with victory in the play-off final, though Bramwell was not in the matchday squad at London Stadium.

On 7 October 2022, Bramwell signed on a one-month loan for Whitby Town. The loan was extended for a second month in November.

On 13 January 2023, Bramwell signed on a one-month loan for Gainsborough Trinity. He re-joined Whitby on loan for the remainder of the 2022–23 season.

On 9 May 2023, it was announced that Grimsby had taken up an option in Bramwell's contract to extend it until the end of the 2023–24 season. Following the conclusion of the 2023–24 season, Bramwell was released by the club.

=== Non-league ===
On 2 July 2024, Bramwell joined National League side Gateshead on a one-year deal with the option to extend. On 26 July 2024, he joined National League North side South Shields on loan until 1 January 2025. In April 2025, Bramwell scored his first senior goal which was in a 3–2 away defeat for Gateshead against Hartlepool United.

In July 2025, Bramwell joined Stockton Town.
