= Ninel Krutova =

Russian Olympic diver (born 1926)

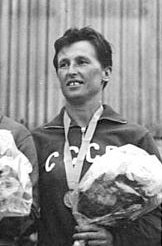
- Ninel Krutova in 1963

Personal information
- Native name: Нинель Васильевна Крутова
- Born: 3 January 1926 (age 100) Kiev, Ukrainian SSR, Soviet Union
- Height: 1.56 m (5 ft 1 in)
- Weight: 54 kg (119 lb)

Sport
- Sport: Diving
- Club: Dynamo Moscow
Medal record
Representing the Soviet Union
Olympic Games
Bronze medal – third place	1960 Rome	10 m platform
European Championships
Gold medal – first place	1958 Budapest	Springboard
Silver medal – second place	1962 Leipzig	Platform

Ninel Vasilyevna Krutova (later Bezzabotnova; Russian: Нинель Васильевна Крутова-Беззаботнова; born 3 January 1926) is a Russian retired diver. She competed at the 1952, 1956 and 1960 Summer Olympics.

== Biography ==
Krutova competed for the Dynamo Moscow club from 1943 and was nine times National Champion in the platform events and four times Springboard champion, she competed for her country for eight years from 1952. Krutova made her Olympic debut when she was 25 years old at the 1952 Summer Olympics, where she finished in fourth place in the 3 metre springboard and 14th in the 10 metre platform, four years later she was competing in the 1956 Summer Olympics, and in her only event the 3 metre springboard she finished in 10th place. Rome was the setting for the 1960 Summer Olympics, and in her third Olympics she was the bronze medal in the 10 metre platform, and also finished in fifth place in the 3 metre springboard even though she went in to the final round in second place.

Before her success at the 1960 Olympics, Krutova won the gold medal at the 1958 European Aquatics Championships in the springboard event, and then followed it up with a silver medal four years later at the 1962 European Aquatics Championships.

In 1964, Krutova started coaching for the Dynamo team, then at the turn of the century, she was a coach to the Russian Veterans' Sports Team. Krutova has also been awarded the Order of the Badge of Honour.

On 3 January 2026, Krutova turned 100.
