= Bende Velin =

Danish diver

Personal information
- Nationality: Danish
- Born: 5 September 1934 (age 91) Copenhagen, Denmark

Sport
- Sport: Diving

Bende Velin (born 5 September 1934) is a Danish diver. She competed in the women's 10 metre platform event at the 1960 Summer Olympics.
