= 2023–24 Grimsby Town F.C. season =

146th season in existence of Grimsby Town FC

Grimsby Town
2023–24 season
- Owner: 1878 Partners (63.1%); The Mariners Trust (13.5%); Other Shareholders (12.9%); Mike Parker (10.5%)
- Chairman: Jason Stockwood
- Manager: Paul Hurst (until 28 October); David Artell (from 27 November)
- Stadium: Blundell Park
- League Two: 21st
- FA Cup: Second Round
- EFL Cup: First round
- EFL Trophy: Group stage
- Top goalscorer: Danny Rose (13)
Home colours	Away colours

The 2023–24 season is the 146th season in the history of Grimsby Town and their second consecutive season in League Two. The club are participating in League Two, the FA Cup, the EFL Cup, and the 2023–24 EFL Trophy.

== Current squad ==
As of 1 March 2024

No.	Name	Position	Nationality	Place of birth	Date of birth (age)	Signed from	Date signed	Fee	Contract end
Goalkeepers
1	Harvey Cartwright	GK	(England)	Grimsby	9 May 2002 (age 24)	Hull City	4 July 2023	Loan	31 May 2024
12	Jake Eastwood	GK	(England)	Rotherham	3 October 1996 (age 30)	Sheffield United	4 July 2023	Undisclosed	30 June 2025
Defenders
2	Liam Smith	RB	(Scotland)	Dalgety Bay	10 April 1996 (age 30)	Cheltenham Town	1 February 2024	Loan	30 June 2024
3	Anthony Glennon	LB	(England)	Bootle	26 November 1999 (age 26)	Burnley	1 July 2022	Free	30 June 2024
5	Harvey Rodgers	CB	(England)	Selby	20 October 1996 (age 30)	Accrington Stanley	1 July 2023	Free	30 June 2026
24	Doug Tharme	CB	(England)	Birkenhead	17 August 1999 (age 27)	Blackpool	12 January 2024	Undisclosed	30 June 2025
28	Toby Mullarkey	CB	(England)	Warrington	4 November 1995 (age 31)	Rochdale	14 June 2023	Undisclosed	30 June 2025
31	Niall Maher	CB	(England)	Manchester	31 July 1995 (age 31)	FC Halifax Town	1 July 2022	Free	30 June 2024
33	Denver Hume	LB	(England)	Ashington	11 August 1998 (age 28)	Portsmouth	1 February 2024	Free	30 June 2024
38	Jamie Bramwell	CB	(England)	Newcastle upon Tyne	25 January 2004 (age 22)	Newcastle United	1 July 2021	Free	30 June 2024
Midfielders
4	Kieran Green	AM	(England)	Stockton-on-Tees	30 June 1997 (age 29)	FC Halifax Town	15 July 2022	Undisclosed	30 June 2024
6	Curtis Thompson	CM	(England)	Nottingham	2 September 1993 (age 33)	Cheltenham Town	1 February 2024	Free	30 June 2025
7	Abo Eisa	LW	(Sudan)	Khartoum	5 January 1996 (age 30)	Bradford City	1 July 2023	Free	30 June 2024
8	Gavan Holohan	AM	(Republic of Ireland)	Kilkenny	15 December 1991 (age 34)	Hartlepool United	22 March 2022	Free	30 June 2024
10	Charles Vernam	LW	(England)	Lincoln	8 October 1996 (age 30)	Lincoln City	20 June 2023	Undisclosed	30 June 2026
15	Harry Clifton	CM	(Wales)	(England) Grimsby	12 June 1998 (age 28)	Academy	1 July 2015	Trainee	30 June 2024
16	Callum Ainley	CM	(England)	Swindon	2 November 1997 (age 29)	Crewe Alexandra	9 September 2023	Free	30 June 2024
18	Harry Wood	CM	(England)	Leeds	2 August 2002 (age 24)	Hull City	12 January 2024	Loan	31 May 2024
19	Jamie Andrews	CM	(England)	Solihull	19 September 2002 (age 24)	West Bromwich Albion	28 August 2023	Loan	31 May 2024
30	Evan Khouri	CM	(England)	London	21 January 2003 (age 23)	West Ham United	7 July 2019	Free	30 June 2026
37	Harvey Tomlinson	RW	(England)	Grimsby	17 May 2004 (age 22)	Academy	1 July 2023	Trainee	30 June 2024
Forwards
9	Rekeil Pyke	CF	(England)	Leeds	1 September 1997 (age 29)	Shrewsbury Town	1 July 2023	Free	30 June 2025
14	Arthur Gnahoua	CF	(France)	Grenoble	18 September 1992 (age 34)	Morecambe	5 August 2023	Free	30 June 2024
20	Justin Obikwu	CF	(Trinidad and Tobago)	Brent	18 February 2004 (age 22)	Coventry City	12 January 2024	Loan	31 May 2024
25	Donovan Wilson	CF	(England)	Yate	14 March 1997 (age 29)	Sutton United	1 July 2023	Free	30 June 2025
32	Danny Rose	CF	(England)	Barnsley	10 December 1993 (age 32)	Stevenage	14 June 2023	Undisclosed	30 June 2025
35	Cameron Gardner	CF	(England)	Newcastle-Upon-Tyne	22 September 2005 (age 21)	Academy	22 September 2023	Trainee	30 June 2026
39	Edwin Essel	CF	(England)	Grimsby	18 August 2004 (age 22)	Academy	1 July 2023	Trainee	30 June 2024
Out on Loan
-	Danny Amos	LB	(Northern Ireland)	(England) Sheffield	22 December 1999 (age 26)	Port Vale	13 January 2022	Free	30 June 2024
-	Otis Khan	RM	(Pakistan)	(England) Ashton-Under-Lyne	22 September 1995 (age 31)	Leyton Orient	1 July 2022	Undisclosed	30 June 2024
-	Alex Hunt	CM	(England)	Sheffield	29 May 2000 (age 26)	Sheffield Wednesday	1 September 2022	Undisclosed	30 June 2025
-	Aaron Braithwaite	CM	(England)	Grimsby	13 October 2003 (age 23)	Academy	1 July 2023	Trainee	30 June 2024
Players departed midseason
2	Michee Efete	RB	(Democratic Republic of the Congo)	(England) London	1 March 1997 (age 29)	Wealdstone	1 July 2021	Free	30 June 2024
6	Luke Waterfall	CB	(England)	Sheffield	30 July 1990 (age 36)	Shrewsbury Town	15 August 2019	Undisclosed	30 June 2024
42	Kamil Conteh	CM	(Sierra Leone)	(England) London	26 December 2002 (age 23)	Middlesbrough	3 July 2023	Undisclosed	30 June 2026

== Transfers ==
=== In ===
Date	Pos	Player	Transferred from	Fee	Ref
14 June 2023	CB	Toby Mullarkey (ENG)	Rochdale (ENG)	Undisclosed	
14 June 2023	CF	Danny Rose (ENG)	Stevenage (ENG)	Undisclosed	
20 June 2023	LW	Charles Vernam (ENG)	Lincoln City (ENG)	Undisclosed	
1 July 2023	LW	Abo Eisa (SUD)	Bradford City (ENG)	Free transfer	
1 July 2023	CF	Rekeil Pyke (ENG)	Shrewsbury Town (ENG)	Free transfer	
1 July 2023	CB	Harvey Rodgers (ENG)	Accrington Stanley (ENG)	Free transfer	
1 July 2023	CF	Donovan Wilson (ENG)	Sutton United (ENG)	Free transfer	
3 July 2023	CM	Kamil Conteh (SLE)	Middlesbrough (ENG)	Undisclosed	
4 July 2023	GK	Jake Eastwood (ENG)	Sheffield United (ENG)	Undisclosed	
5 August 2023	LW	Arthur Gnahoua (FRA)	Morecambe (ENG)	Free transfer	
9 September 2023	CM	Callum Ainley (ENG)	Free agent	—N/a	
12 January 2024	CB	Doug Tharme (ENG)	Blackpool (ENG)	Undisclosed	
1 February 2024	LB	Denver Hume (ENG)	Portsmouth (ENG)	Free transfer	
1 February 2024	CM	Curtis Thompson (ENG)	Cheltenham Town (ENG)	Free transfer	

=== Out ===
Date	Pos	Player	Transferred to	Fee	Ref
29 June 2023	CF	Danilo Orsi (ENG)	Crawley Town (ENG)	Undisclosed	
30 June 2023	CM	Louis Boyd (ENG)	Cleethorpes Town (ENG)	Released	
30 June 2023	GK	Ollie Battersby (ENG)	Guiseley (ENG)	Released	
30 June 2023	GK	Max Crocombe (NZL)	Burton Albion (ENG)	Rejected Contract	
30 June 2023	RB	Jordan Cropper (ENG)	Barnet (ENG)	Released	
30 June 2023	GK	Dec Dennis (ENG)	Cleethorpes Town (ENG)	Released	
30 June 2023	RB	Josh Emmanuel (ENG)	Carlisle United (ENG)	Released	
30 June 2023	LB	Owen Gallacher (SCO)	Spennymoor Town (ENG)	Released	
30 June 2023	CB	Jaz Goundry (ENG)	Alfreton Town (ENG)	Released	
30 June 2023	RB	Alex Markham (ENG)	Bridlington Town (ENG)	Released	
30 June 2023	DM	Bryn Morris (ENG)	Newport County (WAL)	Released	
30 June 2023	CB	Shaun Pearson (ENG)	Retired		
30 June 2023	RW	Sean Scannell (IRL)	Hornchurch (ENG)	Released	
30 June 2023	CF	Ryan Taylor (ENG)	Alfreton Town (ENG)	Released	
30 June 2023	LB	Tom Zerboni (ENG)	Grantham Town (ENG)	Released	
25 January 2024	CB	Luke Waterfall (ENG)	Hartlepool United (ENG)	Free transfer	
26 January 2024	CM	Kamil Conteh (SLE)	Bristol Rovers (ENG)	Undisclosed	
31 January 2024	RB	Michee Efete (DRC)	Ross County (SCO)	Mutual Consent	

=== Loaned in ===
Date	Pos	Player	Loaned from	Date until	Ref
4 July 2023	GK	Harvey Cartwright (ENG)	Hull City (ENG)	End of season	
28 August 2023	MF	Jamie Andrews (ENG)	West Bromwich Albion (ENG)	End of season	
12 January 2024	CF	Justin Obikwu (TTO)	Coventry City (ENG)	End of season	
12 January 2024	CM	Harry Wood (ENG)	Hull City (ENG)	End of season	
1 February 2024	RB	Liam Smith (SCO)	Cheltenham Town (ENG)	End of season	

=== Loaned out ===
Date	Pos	Player	Loaned to	Until	Ref
18 August 2023	CF	Edwin Essel (ENG)	Guiseley (ENG)	15 September 2023	
19 August 2023	CM	Aaron Braithwaite (ENG)	Stafford Rangers (ENG)	24 November 2023	
25 August 2023	RW	Harvey Tomlinson (ENG)	Grimsby Borough (ENG)	1 January 2024	
26 September 2023	CF	Edwin Essel (ENG)	Grimsby Borough (ENG)	2 January 2024	
16 December 2023	CB	Jamie Bramwell (ENG)	Whitby Town (ENG)	13 January 2024	
25 January 2024	RM	Otis Khan (PAK)	Hartlepool United (ENG)	30 June 2024	
31 January 2024	CM	Evan Khouri (ENG)	Spennymoor Town (ENG)	29 February 2024	
6 February 2024	LB	Danny Amos (NIR)	York City (ENG)	End of season	
22 February 2024	CM	Alex Hunt (ENG)	York City (ENG)	End of season	
1 March 2024	CM	Aaron Braithwaite (ENG)	Whitby Town (ENG)	1 April 2024	

== Pre-season and friendlies ==
On 31 May, Grimsby Town announced their pre-season schedule, with friendlies against Grimsby Borough, Cleethorpes Town, Hull City, Lincoln City, Boston United and Fleetwood Town along with a training camp in Spain confirmed. Grimsby confirmed they would play both Port Vale and UAE Pro League side Al-Ain FC at the Real Club de Golf Campoamor Resort in Alicante.

Win Draw Loss Fixtures

4 July 2023 Friendly	Grimsby Borough	1–5	Grimsby Town	Grimsby
19:30 BST	York 34' (pen.)	Report	Rose 19'; Maher 28'; Clifton 45+1'; Pyke 73', 76'	Stadium: Bradley Football Development Centre

8 July 2023 Friendly	Cleethorpes Town	1–2	Grimsby Town	Grimsby
14:00 BST	Bateson 33'	Report	Efete 16'; Wilson 82'	Stadium: MyEnergi Stadium

15 July 2023 Friendly	Grimsby Town	1–2^{1}	Hull City	Cleethorpes
15:00 BST	Wilson 112'	Report	Slater 62'; Longman 111'	Stadium: Blundell Park

18 July 2023 Friendly	Qatar SC	1–0	(England) Grimsby Town	Dehesa de Campoamor, Alicante, Spain
18:00 CST	Benoun	Report		Stadium: Real Club de Golf Campoamor Resort

19 July 2023 Friendly	(United Arab Emirates) Al-Ain	Postponed	(England) Grimsby Town	Dehesa de Campoamor, Alicante, Spain
18:00 CST				Stadium: Real Club de Golf Campoamor Resort

21 July 2023 Friendly	Port Vale	1–1^{1}	Grimsby Town	Dehesa de Campoamor, Alicante, Spain
10:00 CST	Garrity	Report	Wilson	Stadium: Real Club de Golf Campoamor Resort

25 July 2023 Friendly	Grimsby Town	2–0	Lincoln City	Cleethorpes
19:30 BST	Hunt 31'; Rose 39'	Report		Stadium: Blundell Park

26 July 2023 Friendly	Boston United	3–2	Grimsby Town XI	Boston
19:45 BST	Wilson 46'; Mooney 60', 75'		Gardner 10'; Bostwick (OG) 28'	Stadium: Boston Community Stadium; Attendance: 891

29 July 2023 Friendly	Fleetwood Town	1–0	Grimsby Town	Fleetwood
15:00 BST	Omochere 13'	Report		Stadium: Highbury Stadium

- Game incorporated four-thirty minute quarters as opposed to using the traditional clock.

== Competitions ==
=== Overall record ===
Competition	Starting round	Final position	Record							
Competition	Starting round	Final position	Pld	W	D	L	GF	GA	GD	Win %
League Two	Matchday 1		30	6	11	13	42	54	−12	20.00
FA Cup	First round	Second round	3	1	1	1	8	5	+3	33.33
EFL Cup	First round	First round	1	0	0	1	0	2	−2	0.00
EFL Trophy	Group stage	Group stage	3	0	1	2	3	6	−3	0.00
Total			37	7	13	17	53	67	−14	18.92

Last updated: 10 February 2024
Source: Soccerway

=== League Two ===
==== League table ====
Pos	Team	Pld	W	D	L	GF	GA	GD	Pts	Promotion, qualification or relegation
18	Newport County	46	16	7	23	62	76	−14	55	
19	Swindon Town	46	14	12	20	77	83	−6	54	
20	Salford City	46	13	12	21	66	82	−16	51	
21	Grimsby Town	46	11	16	19	57	74	−17	49	
22	Colchester United	46	11	12	23	59	80	−21	45	
23	Sutton United (R)	46	9	15	22	59	84	−25	42	Relegated to National League
24	Forest Green Rovers (R)	46	11	9	26	44	78	−34	42	Relegated to National League

Source: EFL Official Website
Rules for classification: 1) Points; 2) Goal difference; 3) Number of goals scored; 4) Head-to-head results; 5) Wins; 6) Away goals; 7) Penalty points (sec 9.5); 8) 12-point sending off offences
(R) Relegated

==== Results summary ====
Overall								Home						Away					
Pld	W	D	L	GF	GA	GD	Pts	W	D	L	GF	GA	GD	W	D	L	GF	GA	GD
46	11	16	19	57	74	−17	49	9	5	9	34	41	−7	2	11	10	23	33	−10

Last updated: 27 April 2024.
Source: Soccerway

==== Results by round ====
Round	1	2	3	4	5	6	7	8	9	10	11	12	13	14	15	16	17	18	19	20	21	22	23	24	25	26	28	30	31	32	34	35	36	27^{1}	37	38	39	40	41	42	43	29^{2}	44	33^{3}	45	46
Ground	H	A	H	H	A	H	A	A	H	A	H	A	H	A	H	A	H	A	H	A	H	A	H	A	A	H	H	H	A	H	H	A	H	A	A	H	A	H	A	H	H	A	A	A	H	A
Result	D	L	W	D	D	W	D	L	L	L	W	D	L	L	L	L	W	D	D	D	W	D	L	L	W	L	D	L	D	L	L	D	W	D	D	W	D	L	L	D	W	L	W	L	W	L
Position	13	19	9	14	15	12	12	15	17	19	16	18	18	20	20	21	21	21	21	20	19	18	19	19	19	20	19	20	20	21	22	22	21	21	21	21	21	21	21	21	21	21	21	21	21	21

Updated to match(es) played on 20 April 2024. Source: Soccerway
A = Away; H = Home; W = Win; D = Draw; L = Loss; P = Postponed
Notes:
- ^{1} Matchday 27 (vs AFC Wimbledon) was postponed due to Wimbledon's FA Cup involvement.
- ^{2} Matchday 29 (vs Harrogate Town) was postponed due to a frozen pitch.
- ^{3} Matchday 33 (vs Colchester United) was postponed due to a waterlogged pitch.

==== Matches ====
On 22 June, the EFL League Two fixtures were released.

Win Draw Loss Fixtures

5 August 2023 1	Grimsby Town	0–0	AFC Wimbledon	Cleethorpes
15:00 BST	Clifton (yellow card) 58'; Conteh (yellow card) 69'; Green (yellow card) 89'; Pyke (yellow card) 90+8'	Report	Johnson (yellow card) 49'; Al-Hamadi (penalty missed) 59' (yellow card) 61'; Little (yellow card) 90+6'	Stadium: Blundell Park; Attendance: 7,214; Referee: Matthew Corlett

12 August 2023 2	Notts County	3–2	Grimsby Town	Nottingham
15:00 BST	Palmer (yellow card) 8'; Bostock 40'; Nemane (yellow card) 45+4'; Waterfall 50' (o.g.); Crowley 61'; Stone (yellow card) 90'; Adebayo-Rowling (yellow card) 90+4'	Report	Rose 17' (yellow card) 25'; Glennon (yellow card) 24'; Clifton (yellow card) 34' (goal) 45+7'; Conteh (yellow card) 64'	Stadium: Meadow Lane; Attendance: 12,950; Referee: Edward Duckworth

15 August 2023 3	Grimsby Town	2–0	Salford City	Cleethorpes
19:45 BST	Eisa 20', 65'	Report	Ashley (yellow card) 33' (yellow-red card) 49'; Lund (yellow card) 70'; Mallan (yellow card) 73'; Vassell (yellow card) 90+3'	Stadium: Blundell Park; Attendance: 5,968; Referee: Peter Wright

19 August 2023 4	Grimsby Town	1–1	Mansfield Town	Cleethorpes
15:00 BST	Eisa 6'	Report	Oates 59'	Stadium: Blundell Park; Attendance: 7,100; Referee: Will Finnie

26 August 2023 5	Walsall	1–1	Grimsby Town	Walsall
15:00 BST	Hussey (yellow card) 9' (yellow-red card) 90+2'; Knowles (yellow card) 59'; Stirk 81'; Evans (yellow card) 90+6'	Report	Rose (yellow card) 7'; Rodgers (yellow card) 41'; Eisa 52'; Clifton (yellow card) 89'	Stadium: Poundland Bescot Stadium; Attendance: 5,314; Referee: Ben Atkinson

2 September 2023 6	Grimsby Town	2–0	Gillingham	Cleethorpes
15:00 BST	Maher 12'; Holohan 27'; Amos (yellow card) 90+3'	Report		Stadium: Blundell Park; Attendance: 6,479; Referee: Adam Herczeg

9 September 2023 7	Bradford City	1–1	Grimsby Town	Bradford
12:30 BST	Kelly (yellow card) 6'; Gilliead 89'; Afoka (yellow card) 90+3'	Report	Eisa (yellow card) 8'; Rodgers (yellow card) 32'; Amos (yellow card) 34'; Rose 43'; Conteh (yellow card) 53'	Stadium: University of Bradford Stadium; Attendance: 18,879; Referee: Sam Purkiss

16 September 2023 8	Wrexham	3–0	Grimsby Town	Wrexham
15:00 BST	McClean (yellow card) 6'; Palmer 21'; Boyle 31'; Lee (yellow card) 44' (goal) 79'	Report	Conteh (yellow card) 39'; Maher (yellow card) 50'	Stadium: STōK Cae Ras; Attendance: 10,116; Referee: David Rock

23 September 2023 9	Grimsby Town	2–3	Crawley Town	Cleethorpes
15:00 BST	Holohan 24'; Eisa 30'; Conteh (yellow card) 38'	Report	Maguire (yellow card) 17'; Kelly 32'; Darcy 35'; Orsi 90+6'	Stadium: Blundell Park; Attendance: 6,357; Referee: Simon Mather

30 September 2023 10	Swindon Town	2–1	Grimsby Town	Swindon
15:00 BST	Kemp 26'; Blake-Tracy (yellow card) 60'; Cain 64'; Hutton (yellow card) 90+5'	Report	Clifton (yellow card) 62'; Wilson 70'; Rodgers (yellow card) 90+2'	Stadium: The County Ground; Attendance: 9,168; Referee: Andy Davies

3 October 2023 11	Grimsby Town	2–1	Barrow	Cleethorpes
19:45 BST	Eisa (penalty missed) 18'; Conteh (yellow card) 32'; Rose 37'; Wilson 75'	Report	Chester (yellow card) 45+3'; Foley 79'	Stadium: Blundell Park; Attendance: 4,882; Referee: Thomas Kirk

7 October 2023 12	Tranmere Rovers	2–2	Grimsby Town	Birkenhead
15:00 BST	Morris 16' (yellow card) 59'; Jennings 61'	Report	Rose 27'; Pyke 44' (yellow card) 49'	Stadium: Prenton Park; Attendance: 5,968; Referee: Martin Coy

14 October 2023 13	Grimsby Town	0–2	Accrington Stanley	Cleethorpes
15:00 BST	Waterfall (yellow card) 17' (yellow-red card) 72'	Report	Leigh (yellow card) 51'; Martin (yellow card) 66'; Whalley 74'; Andrews 82'	Stadium: Blundell Park; Attendance: 6,335; Referee: Lewis Smith

21 October 2023 14	Stockport County	3–2	Grimsby Town	Stockport
15:00 GMT	Barry 6' (pen.), 74'; Olaofe 8' (penalty missed) 39'; Hinchliffe (yellow card) 52'; Hippolyte (yellow card) 61'	Report	Clifton (yellow card) 12'; Eastwood (yellow card) 38'; Wilson 45+1'; Holohan 52' (pen.); Rodgers (yellow card) 72'	Stadium: Edgeley Park; Attendance: 9,498; Referee: Scott Simpson

24 October 2023 15	Grimsby Town	2–3	Colchester United	Cleethorpes
19:45 GMT	Goodman 7' (o.g.); Andrews (yellow card) 39'; Wilson 52'	Report	Taylor 10'; Mitchell (yellow card) 22' (goal) 35'; Dallison (yellow card) 60'; Read 64'; Egbo (yellow card) 66'	Stadium: Blundell Park; Attendance: 5,010; Referee: Alan Young

28 October 2023 16	Doncaster Rovers	1–0	Grimsby Town	Doncaster
15:00 GMT	Bailey (yellow card) 51'; Close (yellow card) 68'; Ironside 72' (pen.); Jones (yellow card) 80'	Report	Holohan (yellow card) 44'; Rose (yellow card) 74'	Stadium: Eco-Power Stadium; Attendance: 8,746; Referee: Darren Drysdale

11 November 2023 17	Grimsby Town	3–2	Morecambe	Cleethorpes
15:00 GMT	Khan (yellow card) 16'; Rose 47'; Green 49'; Pyke 59'; Holohan (yellow card) 74'; Hunt (yellow card) 90+5'	Report	Mayor 2'; Tutonda (yellow card) 44'; McKiernan 86'	Stadium: Blundell Park; Attendance: 5,939; Referee: Alan Young

18 November 2023 18	Forest Green Rovers	2–2	Grimsby Town	Nailsworth
15:00 GMT	Bernard (yellow card) 6'; McAllister 37' (pen.), 44'	Report	Rose (yellow card) 5'; Holohan 65' (yellow card) 76'; Wilson 80'	Stadium: The Bolt New Lawn; Attendance: 2,580; Referee: Scott Tallis

25 November 2023 19	Grimsby Town	1–1	Sutton United	Cleethorpes
15:00 GMT	Pyke 19'	Report	Smith 45+5'	Stadium: Blundell Park; Attendance: 5,456; Referee: Matthew Corlett

28 November 2023 20	Milton Keynes Dons	1–1	Grimsby Town	Denbigh
19:45 GMT	Williams (yellow card) 45+7'; Payne 66'	Report	Pyke 20'; Conteh (yellow card) 64'; Ainley (yellow card) 85'; Wilson (yellow card) 90'	Stadium: Stadium mk Attendance: 4,962; Referee: Peter Wright

9 December 2023 21	Grimsby Town	2–1	Crewe Alexandra	Cleethorpes
15:00 GMT	Eisa 18'; Mullarkey (yellow card) 33'; Rose 45'	Report	White 78' (yellow card) 79'; Rowe (yellow card) 85'; O'Riordan (yellow card) 90+1'	Stadium: Blundell Park; Attendance: 5,291; Referee: Richie Watkins

16 December 2023 22	Newport County	1–1	Grimsby Town	Newport
15:00 GMT	Bogle 72' (yellow card) 90+4'	Report	Rose 78'	Stadium: Rodney Parade; Attendance: 3,809; Referee: Tom Nield

23 December 2023 23	Grimsby Town	1–2	Harrogate Town	Cleethorpes
15:00 GMT	Green 90+1'; Driscoll-Glennon (yellow card) 90+3'	Report	Foulds 41'; Odoh 72'; March (yellow card) 90+4'	Stadium: Blundell Park; Attendance: 6,302; Referee: Adam Herczeg

26 December 2023 24	Mansfield Town	2–0	Grimsby Town	Mansfield
12:30 GMT	Keillor-Dunn 19'; Johnson (yellow card) 30'; Pym (yellow card) 45+4'; Maris 45+5', (yellow card) 67'	Report	Rodgers (yellow card) 21'	Stadium: One Call Stadium; Attendance: 8,125; Referee: Ollie Yates

29 December 2023 25	Salford City	0–3	Grimsby Town	Kersal
19:45 GMT		Report	Clifton 39'; Mullarkey 70'; Rose 84', (yellow card) 86'	Stadium: Peninsula Stadium; Attendance: 2,921; Referee: Dale Baines

1 January 2024 26	Grimsby Town	1–6	Walsall	Cleethorpes
15:00 GMT	Rose 29'	Report	James-Taylor 38'; Hutchinson 43', 55' (pen.); Earing 50'; Farquharson 66'; Allen (yellow card) 71'; Johnson 90+5'	Stadium: Blundell Park; Attendance: 6,355; Referee: Edward Duckworth

13 January 2024 28	Grimsby Town	5–5	Notts County	Cleethorpes
15:00 GMT	Rose 7'; Eisa 15', 62'; Clifton 52' (yellow card) 87'; Wood 90+5'	Report	Baldwin (yellow card) 23'; McGoldrick 39', 90+2'; Langstaff 45'; Robertson (yellow card) 45+4'; Nemane 60', 79'; Jones (yellow card) 84'	Stadium: Blundell Park; Attendance: 7,567; Referee: Craig Hicks

27 January 2024 30	Grimsby Town	1-2	Tranmere Rovers	Cleethorpes
15:00 GMT	Tharme 39'		Apter 35'; Mullarkey 54' (o.g.)	Stadium: Blundell Park; Attendance: 6,421; Referee: Paul Howard

3 February 2024 31	Accrington Stanley	0–0	Grimsby Town	Accrington
15:00 GMT	Woods (yellow card) 49'	Report	Hume (yellow card) 79'	Stadium: Wham Stadium; Attendance: 8,745; Referee: David Rock

10 February 2024 32	Grimsby Town	1–3	Stockport County	Cleethorpes
15:00 GMT	Thompson (yellow card) 31'; Smith (yellow card) 34'; Eisa 52'; Green (yellow card) 67'; Maher (yellow card) 77'	Report	Sarcevic 9', (yellow card) 48'; Olaofe 14'; Cass 28', (yellow card) 65'; Camps (yellow card) 42'	Stadium: Blundell Park; Attendance: 6,732; Referee: Thomas Parsons

17 February 2024 34	Grimsby Town	1–5	Doncaster Rovers	Cleethorpes
15:00 GMT	Rose 19' (pen.); Smith (yellow card) 45+4'; Clifton (yellow card) 74'	Report	Molyneux 6'; Ironside 8'; Bailey (yellow card) 28'; Maher 51' (o.g.); Craig (yellow card) 53', (goal) 72'; Hurst 82'; Sterry (yellow card) 90+3'	Stadium: Blundell Park; Attendance: 7,424; Referee: Thomas Kirk

24 February 2024 35	Morecambe	1–1	Grimsby Town	Morecambe
15:00 GMT	Slew 53'; Khumbeni (yellow card) 85'	Report	Rose 2'; Holohan (yellow card) 85'	Stadium: Mazuma Stadium; Attendance: 3,794; Referee: Will Finnie

2 March 2024 36	Grimsby Town	1–0	Forest Green Rovers	Cleethorpes
15:00 GMT	Rodgers 8'; Green (yellow card) 90+5'	Report	Keogh (yellow card) 90+5'	Stadium: Blundell Park; Attendance: 6,506; Referee: Tom Reeves

5 March 2024 27	AFC Wimbledon	0–0	Grimsby Town	Wimbledon
19:45 GMT	Curtis (yellow card) 62'	Report	Thompson (yellow card) 29'; Holohan (yellow card) 44'; Andrews (yellow card) 64'; Hume (yellow card) 94'	Stadium: The Cherry Red Records Stadium; Attendance: 7,028; Referee: Daniel Middleton
Note: Fixture was originally scheduled for 6 January, but was postponed due to Wimbledon's FA Cup involvement.

9 March 2024 37	Sutton United	1–1	Grimsby Town	Sutton
15:00 GMT	Eastmond (yellow card) 82'; Lakin 88' (pen.)	Report	Obikwu 44'; Thompson (yellow card) 54'; Rose (yellow card) 80'; Rodgers (yellow card) 82'	Stadium: VBS Community Stadium; Attendance: 3,346; Referee: Alex Chilowicz

12 March 2024 38	Grimsby Town	1–0	Milton Keynes Dons	Cleethorpes
19:45 GMT	Gnahoua (yellow card) 10'; Mullarkey (yellow card) 16'; Obikwu 33'; Holohan (yellow card) 44', (penalty missed) 45+2'; Hume (yellow card) 73'; Thompson (yellow card) 90'	Report		Stadium: Blundell Park; Attendance: 5,659; Referee: Aaron Bannister

16 March 2024 39	Gillingham	1–1	Grimsby Town	Gillingham
15:00 GMT	Lapslie 15', (yellow card) 84'; McKenzie (yellow card) 83'	Report	Wilson 13'; Clifton (yellow card) 18'; Tharme (yellow card) 22'; Hume (yellow card) 66'	Stadium: Priestfield Stadium; Attendance: 6,065; Referee: James Bell

23 March 2024 40	Grimsby Town	1–3	Wrexham	Cleethorpes
15:00 GMT	Hume (yellow card) 48'; Gnahoua 81'	Report	Cannon 5', 36'; Mullin 42'; Cleworth (yellow card) 90+4'	Stadium: Blundell Park; Attendance: 7,728; Referee: Ollie Yates

29 March 2024 41	Barrow	3–1	Grimsby Town	Barrow-in-Furness
15:00 GMT	Stockton 11', 22'; Telford (yellow card) 72'; Gotts 82'	Report	Obikwu 89'	Stadium: Holker Street; Attendance: 4,024; Referee: Oliver Langford

1 April 2024 42	Grimsby Town	1–1	Bradford City	Cleethorpes
13:00 BST	Hume (yellow card) 37' (yellow-red card) 90+1'; Thompson 55'; Andrews (yellow card) 85'; Rodgers (yellow card) 90+2'	Report	Oyegoke (yellow card) 53'; Kavanagh (yellow card) 56'; Platt (yellow card) 67'; Wright (yellow card) 80'; Kelly (yellow card) 84'; Smallwood 90+3' (pen.)	Stadium: Blundell Park; Attendance: 6,711; Referee: Matthew Corlett

6 April 2024 43	Grimsby Town	1–0	Newport County	Cleethorpes
15:00 BST	Rose 33'; Green (yellow card) 36'; Thompson (yellow card) 80'	Report	Charsley (yellow card) 36'; Jephcott (yellow card) 54'	Stadium: Blundell Park; Attendance: 5,951; Referee: Bobby Madley

9 April 2024 29	Harrogate Town	1–0	Grimsby Town	Harrogate
19:45 BST	Thomson 49'; Abu (yellow card) 83'	Report	Hume (yellow card) 79'	Stadium: Wetherby Road; Attendance: 3,201; Referee: Thomas Parsons
Note: Fixture was originally scheduled for 20 January, but was postponed due to a frozen pitch.

13 April 2024 44	Crewe Alexandra	0–3	Grimsby Town	Crewe
15:00 BST	Cooney (yellow card) 34'; Williams (yellow card) 62'	Report	Mullarkey 38', (yellow card) 45'; Thompson 59'; Hume 90'	Stadium: Mornflake Stadium; Attendance: 5,665; Referee: Simon Mather

16 April 2024 33	Colchester United	2–0	Grimsby Town	Colchester
19:45 BST	Hopper 5'; Hornby (yellow card) 73'; Iandolo (yellow card) 75'; Akinde 79'; Dallison (red card) 90+6'	Report	Obikwu (yellow card) 48'; Mullarkey (yellow card) 90+2'	Stadium: Colchester Community Stadium; Attendance: 4,350; Referee: Carl Brook
Note: Fixture was originally scheduled for 13 February, but was postponed due to a waterlogged pitch.

20 April 2024 45	Grimsby Town	2–0	Swindon Town	Cleethorpes
15:00 BST	Holohan (yellow card) 69'; Smith 75'; Wilson 85'	Report		Stadium: Blundell Park; Attendance: 6,752; Referee: Martin Coy

27 April 2024 46	Crawley Town	2–0	Grimsby Town	Crawley
15:00 BST	Orsi 24'; Lolos 34'	Report		Stadium: Broadfield Stadium; Attendance: 4,885; Referee: Paul Howard

=== FA Cup ===
Town were drawn away to Ebbsfleet United or Slough Town in the first round.

Win Draw Loss Fixtures

5 November 2023 First round	Slough Town	1–1	Grimsby Town	Slough
14:00 GMT	Davies 28'; Bayliss (yellow card) 66'; Eweka (yellow card) 90+4'	Report	Clifton (yellow card) 33'; Efete (yellow card) 48'; Rose 75'; Maher (yellow card) 89'; Hunt (yellow card) 90+1'	Stadium: Arbour Park; Attendance: 2,205; Referee: Ben Atkinson

14 November 2023 First round replay	Grimsby Town	7–2	Slough Town	Cleethorpes
19:45 GMT	Pyke 7', 45' (yellow card) 60'; Rose 16'; Gnahoua (yellow card) 32' (goal) 65', 85'; Amos (yellow card) 54'; Hunt 81'; Andrews 86'	Report	Dyce 20' (yellow card) 29'; Ogbonna 34'	Stadium: Blundell Park; Attendance: 3,079; Referee: Jacob Miles

2 December 2023 Second round	Oxford United	2–0	Grimsby Town	Oxford
15:00 GMT	McGuane 11'; Rodrigues (yellow card) 29'; Bodin 75'	Report	Hunt (yellow card) 62'	Stadium: Kassam Stadium; Attendance: 4,149; Referee: Darren Bond

=== EFL Cup ===
Grimsby were drawn away to Mansfield Town in the first round.

Win Draw Loss Fixtures

8 August 2023 First round	Mansfield Town	2–0	Grimsby Town	Mansfield
19:30 BST	Akins 28' (pen.); Oates 55'	Report	Cartwright (yellow card) 27'; Green (yellow card) 60'	Stadium: One Call Stadium; Attendance: 3,123; Referee: Scott Jackson

=== EFL Trophy ===
In the group stage, Grimsby Town were drawn into Northern Group F alongside Barnsley, Bradford City and Manchester City U21.

Pos	Div	Team	Pld	W	PW	PL	L	GF	GA	GD	Pts	Qualification
1	L2	Bradford City	3	3	0	0	0	10	2	+8	9	Advance to Round 2
2	L1	Barnsley	3	2	0	0	1	6	6	0	6	Advance to Round 2
3	ACA	Manchester City U21	3	0	1	0	2	3	8	−5	2	
4	L2	Grimsby Town	3	0	0	1	2	3	6	−3	1	

Updated to match(es) played on 31 October 2023. Source: EFL.com

Win Draw Loss Fixtures

29 August 2023 Group stage	Grimsby Town	2–2 (2–4 p)	Manchester City U21	Cleethorpes
19:30 BST	Maher (yellow card) 26'; Gnahoua (yellow card) 73'; Clifton 77'; Pyke 90+1'	Report	Dickson 9'; Ndala 28'; Simpson-Pusey (red card) 35'; Smith (yellow card) 68'	Stadium: Blundell Park; Attendance: 1,101; Referee: Daniel Middleton
	Penalties
	Hunt (penalty scored); Glennon (penalty missed); Clifton (penalty scored); Gnahoua (penalty missed)		Wright (penalty scored); Galvez (penalty scored); Heskey (penalty scored); Samuel (penalty scored)

5 September 2023 Group stage	Barnsley	2–0	Grimsby Town	Barnsley
19:30 BST	Dodgson 33'; Marsh 90+1'	Report		Stadium: Oakwell; Attendance: 2,439; Referee: Ruebyn Ricardo

10 October 2023 Group stage	Grimsby Town	1–2	Bradford City	Cleethorpes
19:30 BST	Pyke 18'; Rodgers (yellow card) 90+2'	Report	Kelly (yellow card) 3' (goal) 16'; Osadebe 48' (red card) 90+2'; McDonald (yellow card) 59'	Stadium: Blundell Park; Attendance: Paul Howard; Referee: 747
