= Inge Beeken =

Danish diver (1921–1987)

Personal information
- Full name: Inge Moyel Beeken
- Nationality: Danish
- Born: 27 May 1921 Copenhagen, Denmark
- Died: 10 July 1987 (aged 66) Copenhagen, Denmark

Sport
- Sport: Diving
Medal record
Women's diving
Representing Denmark
European Championships
Gold medal – first place	1938 London	10 m highboard

Inge Moyel Beeken (27 May 1921 – 10 July 1987) was a Danish diver. She competed in the women's 10 metre platform event at the 1948 Summer Olympics.
