= Nicole Péllissard-Darrigrand =

French diver (1931–2021)

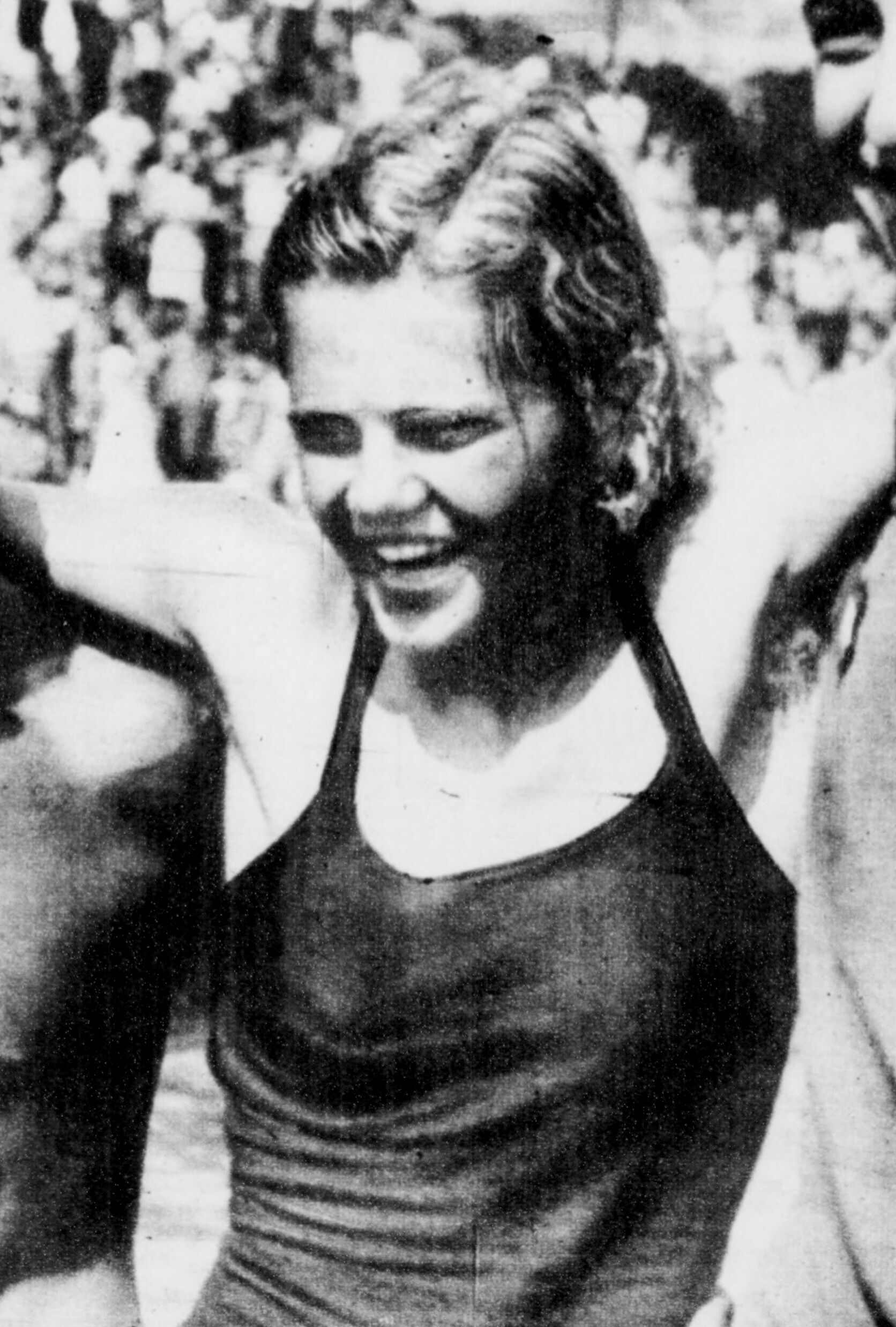

Personal information
- Full name: Nicole Jeanne Marcelle Péllissard-Darrigrand
- Nationality: French
- Born: 5 July 1931 Casablanca, Morocco
- Died: 19 May 2021 (aged 89)

Sport
- Sport: Diving
Medal record
Women's diving
Representing France
European Championships
Gold medal – first place	1947 Monte Carlo	10 m platform
Gold medal – first place	1950 Vienna	10 m platform
Silver medal – second place	1950 Vienna	3 m springboard

Nicole Péllissard-Darrigrand (5 July 1931 – 19 May 2021) was a French diver. She competed at the 1948, 1952, 1956 and the 1960 Summer Olympics.

== Biography ==
Pellissard was 15 years old when she won her first national title and the following year she became 10-metre platform European Champion. Her first appearance at the Olympics happened at the 1948 Summer Olympics, when she was 17 years old, and she finished in fourth place in the 3-metre springboard less than a full point behind Patsy Elsener who won the bronze medal. She also finished 6th in the 10-metre platform.

In 1950, Pellissard retained her European title in the 10-metre platform and also won the silver medal in the 3-metre springboard. At the 1952 and 1956 Summer Olympics, Pellissard finished 4th in each of the 3-metre springboard finals and 7th in both of the 10-metre platform finals. At the 1960 Summer Olympics, she finished in 7th in the 10-metre platform, and in the 3-metre springboard she finished in 9th place and this was the first time she did not qualify for an Olympic final.

By the time Pellissard retired from competing she had been national champion 13 times. She then became a physical education teacher, as well as becoming a journalist. Pellissard was also awarded with the Ordre national du Mérite and the Legion of Honour.
