= Rosa Gutiérrez =

Mexican diver (1919–1990)

Personal information
- Full name: Rosa Gutiérrez de Pardo
- Born: 11 June 1919; Mexico City, Mexico
- Died: 21 January 1990 (aged 70); Mexico City, Mexico

Sport
- Sport: Diving

Rosa Gutiérrez de Pardo (Note: In this Spanish name, the first or paternal surname is Gutiérrez and the second or maternal family name is De Pardo.) (11 June 1919 – 21 January 1990) was a Mexican diver. She competed in the Women's 10 metre platform event at the 1948 Summer Olympics.
