= Kiki Heck =

Dutch diver (1924–2006)

- Heck diving (The Hague, 1948)

Personal information
- Full name: Jacoba Martina "Kiki" Heck (-Brons)
- Nationality: Dutch
- Born: 3 March 1924; Zandvoort, Netherlands
- Died: 24 January 2006 (aged 81); Auckland, New Zealand

Sport
- Sport: Diving
- Club: Tjikini van Batavia / Triton in Cikini, Menteng, Batavia, Dutch East Indies

Jacoba Martina "Kiki" Heck (-Brons) (3 March 1924 – 24 January 2006) was a Dutch diver.

Heck became the Dutch national champion in 1948, winning from former national champion Coby Floor. Both would represent the Netherlands a few weeks later at the 1948 Summer Olympics. A few days before the Olympics, Heck got injured after diving at the swimming pool in Northwood. As the pool was too shallow she injured her nose and cheek and had to take some rest. She competed in the women's 3 metre springboard event at the 1948 Summer Olympics. During the first series of four compulsory dives, she didn't perform well in the two easiest dives. She was ranked 10th after the four compulsory jumps. After the four facultative dives she was ranked 8th overall.
