= Maire Hider =

British diver

Personal information
- Full name: Maire Alice Hider
- Nationality: British
- Born: 11 June 1919 Croydon, England
- Died: 29 June 2006 (aged 87) Bournemouth, England

Sport
- Sport: Diving

Maire Alice Hider (11 June 1919 – 29 June 2006) was a British diver. She competed in the Women's 10 metre platform event at the 1948 Summer Olympics.

Hider started swimming and diving when she was aged 10 and noted that her family had an association with the sport dating back to 1911.

In 1938, Hider held the title for the Surrey High and Springboard Championships and between 1936 and 1938, had five different coaches. She was the only diver in England whose highboard diving had been captured by television broadcasts at that time. In the 1938 European Aquatics Championships, she finished 4th on the 10m highboard.
