= Abo Eisa =

Sudanese footballer (born 1996)

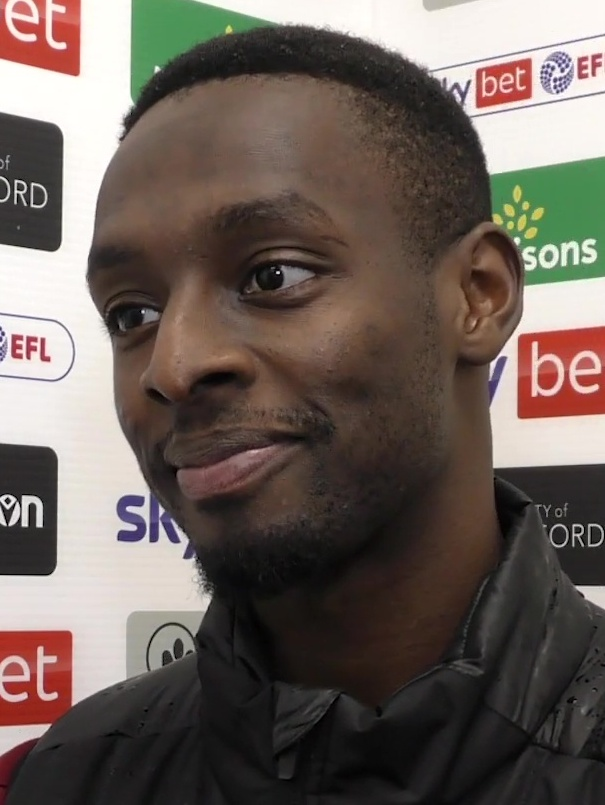
- Eisa in 2023

Personal information
- Full name: Abobaker Mamoun Eisa
- Date of birth: 5 January 1996 (age 30)
- Place of birth: Khartoum, Sudan
- Position: Winger

Youth career
- Pro Touch Soccer Academy
- St Albans City

Senior career*
Years	Team	Apps	(Gls)
2015–2017	Uxbridge	53	(17)
2017–2018	Wealdstone	24	(12)
2018–2019	Shrewsbury Town	10	(1)
2019	→ Colchester United (loan)	14	(2)
2019–2021	Scunthorpe United	67	(14)
2021–2023	Bradford City	18	(2)
2023–2024	Grimsby Town	32	(9)
2024–2025	Nongbua Pitchaya	21	(6)
2025	Al Nasr Benghazi	6	(0)
2025–2026	Chonburi	18	(1)

International career^{‡}
2023–	Sudan	14	(1)
- * Club domestic league appearances and goals as of 22 September 2026 (UTC) ‡ National team caps and goals as of 17:50, 16 November 2026 (UTC)

Abobaker Mamoun Eisa (born 5 January 1996) is a Sudanese professional footballer who plays as a winger. He represents Sudan national team at international level.

Eisa began his career playing non-league football with St Albans City, Uxbridge and Wealdstone. In 2018 he moved into professional football signing with Shrewsbury Town. He has since played for Colchester United, Scunthorpe United and Bradford City.

== Early life ==
Eisa was born in Khartoum, Sudan, in 1996. His family moved to London when he was seven years old.

== Club career ==
=== Early career ===
Eisa played youth football with Pro Touch Soccer Academy and St Albans City, before beginning his senior career in non-league football with Uxbridge. In 2017, he signed for National League South side Wealdstone, where he scored 12 times in 22 starts.

=== Shrewsbury Town ===
On 31 January 2018, Eisa signed for League One side Shrewsbury Town. He scored his first goal for the club in the English Football League on 21 April in a 1−1 draw against Bury.

On 8 April 2018, he appeared as an unused substitute in the 2018 EFL Trophy Final, and received a runner-up medal under the tournament's rules.

In January 2019, he moved on loan to Colchester United. He made a goalscoring debut for the club on 2 February, scoring five minutes after his introduction as a half-time substitute during Colchester's 4–0 win at Northampton Town.

=== Scunthorpe United ===
On 15 August 2019, Eisa signed for the League Two side Scunthorpe United on a two-year deal, reuniting with the former Shrewsbury manager Paul Hurst, making him the club's eighth summer signing.

He was one of 17 players released by Scunthorpe at the end of the 2020–21 season.

=== Bradford City ===
On 18 June 2021, it was announced that Eisa had signed a two-year deal with another League Two side, Bradford City, and would transfer after his contract expiry.

In July 2021, before the start of the 2021–22 season, Eisa spoke highly about the club's pre-season preparation. He suffered an injury early in the season, and, after returning to the first team, underwent hamstring surgery in December 2021, ruling him out for a further four months. By late April 2022, he had returned to training was in possible contention for first team action in the final games of the season.

In June 2022, the Bradford City manager, Mark Hughes, said that Eisa could be considered a new signing after returning from injury, having only played in five matches in the previous season. In July 2022, Eisa said he was happy to have returned to fitness. He was injured again later that month, with what was described as a "significant" injury. He returned to full training in September 2022, and made his first appearance of the 2022–23 season as a late substitute in the EFL trophy on 19 October 2022. On 12 November 2022, he made his first start since 27 November 2021. He said he was looking forward to playing more frequently. He scored his first Bradford City goal on 1 January 2023, scoring the winner in a 3–2 home victory against Salford. Eisa was injured again in February 2023.

In May 2023 it was announced that he would leave Bradford City when his contract expired on 30 June.

=== Grimsby Town ===
In June 2023 it was announced that he would sign for Grimsby Town on 1 July 2023, reuniting him with Paul Hurst and his assistant Chris Doig for a third time. He was nominated for the League Two August 2023 Player of the Month award. Following that announcement, Mark Hughes, his manager at Bradford City, had said Eisa had been "unlucky" at the club. He was released at the end of the 2023–24 season.

=== Later career ===
In July 2024, Eisa signed for Thai club Nongbua Pitchaya. He then had a brief spell with Libyan side Al Nasr Benghazi in 2025, before returning to Thailand to play for Chonburi.

== International career ==
In August 2021, he was called up by the Sudan national team, but could not play for them due to injury. In November 2021, he said he was keen to represent Sudan, but was putting his club first. He made his international debut with the Sudan national team in a 1–1 2026 FIFA World Cup qualification tie with Togo on 16 November 2023. He replaced his brother at half-time, who was also making his debut and scored the side's opening goal.

Eisa played for Sudan at the 2025 AFCON.

== Personal life ==
He is the brother of Mohamed Eisa. He has said that Mohamed has been a role model to him. A younger brother Omar is also a footballer.

He combined his non-league career with studying for a degree in biomedical sciences at Brunel University.

== Honours ==
Shrewsbury Town

- EFL Trophy runner-up: 2017–18
