= Ibone Belausteguigoitia =

Mexican diver

Personal information
- Nationality: Mexican
- Born: 23 May 1930 (age 94); Bilbao, Spain

Sport
- Sport: Diving

Ibone Belausteguigoitia (born 23 May 1930) is a Mexican diver. She competed in the women's 3 metre springboard event at the 1948 Summer Olympics.
