= Aaron Braithwaite =

English footballer

Personal information
- Full name: Aaron David Braithwaite
- Date of birth: 13 October 2003 (age 23)
- Place of birth: Grimsby, England
- Position: Midfielder

Team information
- Current team: Cleethorpes Town

Youth career
- 2011–2022: Grimsby Town

Senior career*
Years	Team	Apps	(Gls)
2022–2024	Grimsby Town	3	(0)
2022–2023	→ Whitby Town (loan)	10	(1)
2023	→ Stafford Rangers (loan)	12	(0)
2024	Gainsborough Trinity	11	(0)
2024	→ Scunthorpe United (dual registration)	0	(0)
2024–	Cleethorpes Town	16	(3)
2024–2025	→ Scunthorpe United (dual-registration)	0	(0)
- * Club domestic league appearances and goals as of 17:27, 21 February 2025 (UTC)

Aaron David Braithwaite (born 13 October 2003) is an English professional footballer who plays as a midfielder for Northern Premier League Premier Division club Cleethorpes Town.

== Career ==
=== Grimsby Town ===
Braithwaite came through the youth academy at Grimsby Town beginning with the under-9's. He was ever present in the youth team and reserve team until 2022. In April 2022, Braithwaite signed his first professional contract with the club.

On 30 August 2022, Braithwaite made his full professional debut against Derby County in the EFL Trophy.

He moved to Whitby Town on a one-month loan on 25 November 2022. Throughout his stay at the club he made 10 appearances and scored 1 goal. His loan was extended numerous times and would eventually be until the end of the 2022–23 season.

Following the end of Whitby's season, Braithwaite returned to Grimsby and made his full league debut on 25 April 2023, coming on as a late substitute in a 2–0 win over Crewe Alexandra.

On 18 August 2023, Braithwaite joined Northern Premier League club Stafford Rangers on loan until January 2024.

Braithwaite was recalled by Grimsby on 24 November 2023. He was released at the end of the 2023–24 season.

=== Non-League ===
Following his release by Grimsby, Braithwaite began the season with Gainsborough Trinity, however following a trial at Scunthorpe United it was announced he had joined both clubs on dual registration terms. In October 2024, in search of more game time, he joined Cleethorpes Town, continuing to also remain registered with Scunthorpe United. His dual-registration ended in February 2025 to allow him to sign a new longer-term contract with Cleethorpes Town.
