= Eva Petersén =

Swedish diver (1923–2012)

Personal information
- Full name: Eva Cecilia Petersén
- Nationality: Swedish
- Born: 5 December 1923 Visby, Sweden
- Died: 5 January 2012 (aged 88) Stockholm, Sweden

Sport
- Sport: Diving

Eva Cecilia Petersén (5 December 1923 – 5 January 2012) was a Swedish diver. She competed in the women's 10 metre platform event at the 1948 Summer Olympics.
