= Diving at the 1960 Summer Olympics – Women's 10 metre platform =

Women's 10 metre platform at the Games of the XVII Olympiad
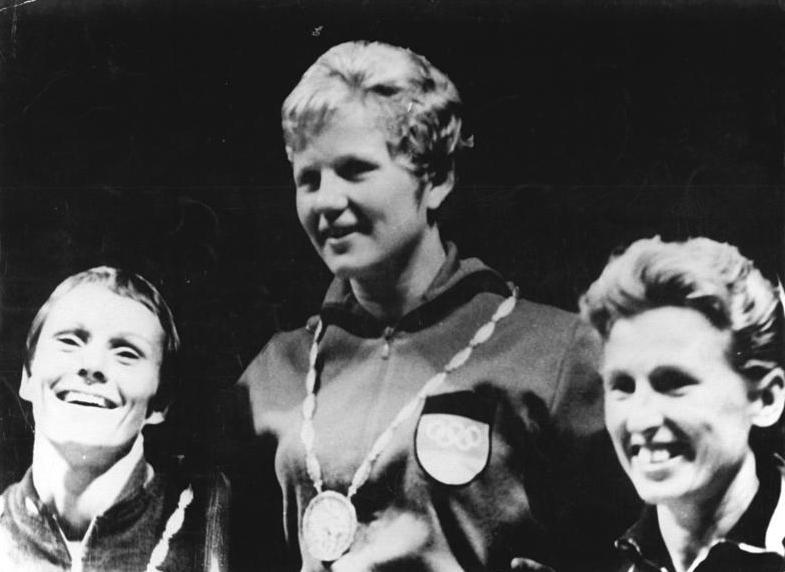
- Medal winners. From left to right: Paula Jean Myers-Pope, Ingrid Krämer and Ninel Krutova

Medalists
1st place, gold medalist(s)		Ingrid Krämer	United Team of Germany
2nd place, silver medalist(s)		Paula Jean Myers-Pope	United States
3rd place, bronze medalist(s)		Ninel Krutova	Soviet Union

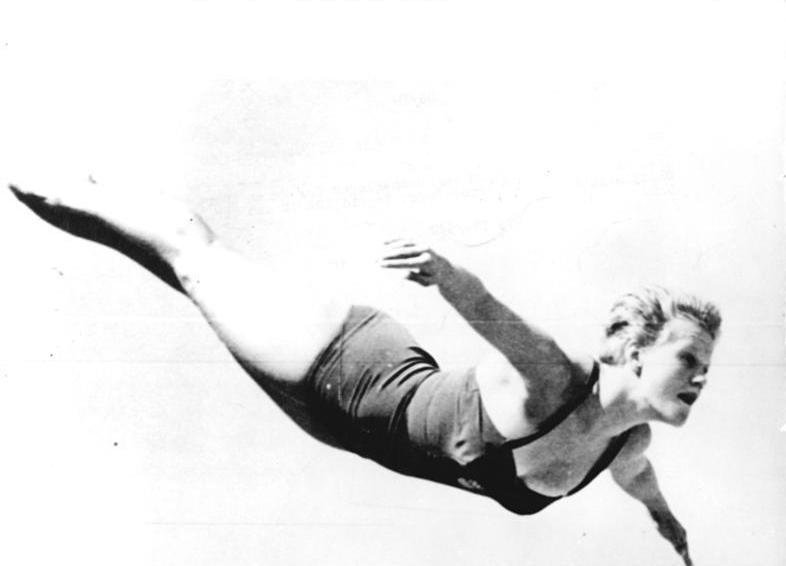
Gold medallist Ingrid Krämer in the final.

The women's 10 metre platform, also reported as 10-metre high diving, was one of four diving events on the Diving at the 1960 Summer Olympics programme.

The competition was split into two phases:

1. Preliminary round (29 August)
  Divers performed four voluntary dives without limit of degrees of difficulty. The twelve divers with the highest scores advanced to the final.
2. Final (30 August)
  Divers performed two voluntary dives without limit of degrees of difficulty. The final ranking was determined by the combined score from the preliminary and final rounds.

== Results ==
Rank	Diver	Nation	Preliminary		Final		
Rank	Diver	Nation	Points	Rank	Points	Rank	Total
1st place, gold medalist(s)	Ingrid Krämer	United Team of Germany	56.30	1	34.98	2	91.28
2nd place, silver medalist(s)	Paula Jean Myers-Pope	United States	54.70	2	35.24	1	89.94
3rd place, bronze medalist(s)	Ninel Krutova	Soviet Union	53.38	3	33.61	3	86.99
4	Juno Stover-Irwin	United States	51.90	6	31.69	4	83.59
5	Raisa Gorokhovskaya	Soviet Union	51.53	8	31.50	5	83.03
6	Norma Thomas	Great Britain	51.77	7	30.44	7	82.21
7	Nicolle Péllissard-Darrigrand	France	49.68	12	31.50	5	81.18
8	Ann Long	Great Britain	52.12	5	28.86	9	80.98
9	Irene MacDonald	Canada	51.31	9	29.18	8	80.49
10	Kumiko Watanabe	Japan	51.04	10	28.56	10	79.60
11	Kanoko Tsutani-Mabuchi	Japan	49.76	11	28.14	11	77.90
12	Birte Christoffersen	Sweden	53.03	4	24.40	12	77.43
13	Maria Teresa Adames	Mexico	49.54	13	did not advance		
14	Hanna Laursen	Denmark	48.89	14	did not advance		
15	Gabriele Schöpe	United Team of Germany	48.81	15	did not advance		
16	Bende Velin	Denmark	48.35	16	did not advance		
17	Laura Conter	Italy	45.55	17	did not advance		
18	Susan Knight	Australia	43.03	18	did not advance		

== Sources ==
- The Organizing Committee of the Games of the XVII Olympiad (1960). "The Official Report of the Organizing Committee for the Games of the XVII Olympiad, Rome 1960, Volume II" (PDF). The Organizing Committee of the Games of the XVII Olympiad. pp. p. 614. Archived from the original (pdf) on 13 August 2011.
- Herman de Wael (7 August 2001). "Diving - women's platform (Rome 1960)".
