= Niall Maher =

English footballer from Bolton

Personal information
- Full name: Niall Callum James Peter Maher
- Date of birth: 31 July 1995 (age 31)
- Place of birth: Gorton, England
- Height: 5 ft 10 in (1.78 m)
- Position: Defender

Team information
- Current team: Eastleigh
- Number: 31

Youth career
- 2003–2014: Bolton Wanderers

Senior career*
Years	Team	Apps	(Gls)
2014–2016	Bolton Wanderers	5	(0)
2015	→ Blackpool (loan)	10	(0)
2016–2017	Bury	22	(1)
2017	Galway United	5	(0)
2018	AFC Telford United	1	(0)
2018–2022	FC Halifax Town	148	(6)
2022–2024	Grimsby Town	61	(4)
2024–	Eastleigh	36	(3)
- * Club domestic league appearances and goals as of 6 September 2025 (UTC)

Niall Callum James Peter Maher (born 31 July 1995) is an English professional footballer who plays as a defender for National League side Eastleigh.

He has previously played in the Football League for Bolton Wanderers, Blackpool, Bury and Grimsby Town as well as in the League of Ireland with Galway United and in non-League football with AFC Telford United and FC Halifax Town. He was voted as part of the National League Team of the Year for 2021–22.

== Club career ==
=== Bolton Wanderers ===
Maher has been with Bolton Wanderers since the age of ten He made his first team debut on 2 April 2016 at home against Reading.

On 22 January 2015, Maher joined Blackpool in a one-month loan and he made his Football League debut as a 57th-minute substitute for Peter Clarke on 24 January 2015 in a 7–2 loss against Watford at Vicarage Road.

=== Bury ===
At the end of the 2015–16 season, Bolton confirmed that he would be leaving when his contract expired at the end of June. On 24 July 2016 it was confirmed that he had joined Bolton's close neighbours Bury on a twelve-month contract. He scored his first goal for Bury against Burton Albion in an EFL Cup tie on 10 August 2016.

=== Galway United ===
On 29 August 2017, Maher joined League of Ireland Premier Division side Galway United.

=== AFC Telford United ===
Maher briefly joined AFC Telford United in February 2018, making one appearance for the club, a 1–0 win over FC United of Manchester in the National League North.

=== FC Halifax Town ===
On 8 March 2018, Maher signed for National League side FC Halifax Town on a deal until the end of the 2017–18 season. On 18 August 2018, Maher extended his stay by agreeing a new two-year deal.

Halifax announced on 17 August 2020 that Maher extended his deal for a further two years.

Ahead of the 2021–22 season Maher was installed as the new club captain, replacing the departing Nathan Clarke. After advancing to the play-offs following a 4th-place finish, Halifax were defeated by Chesterfield in the eliminator round, thus ending their bid to reach the Football League. Maher was voted into the National League Team of the Season.

On 6 June 2022, Maher announced he would be leaving Halifax following the conclusion of the 2021–22 season, he stated upon his departure "To be your captain over the last 18 months has been a massive honour. To the players – it's been one hell of a season with a great dressing room to manage and there is no doubt that you all deserve to be achieving the best in your careers whatever they may be."

=== Grimsby Town ===
On 15 June 2022, following their promotion to the Football League, Maher signed for Grimsby Town ahead of the 2022–23 season, reportedly rejecting an offer from Oldham Athletic who were hopeful of signing him.

Maher was part of the Grimsby team that reached the FA Cup quarter final for the first time since 1939, he played the full 90 minutes of the 2–1 win away at Premier League side Southampton that secured that achievement.

Maher was released following the conclusion of the 2023–24 season.

=== Eastleigh ===
Maher signed for National League side Eastleigh on a free transfer in August 2024.

== Career statistics ==
As of end of 2023–24 season

Club statistics
Club	Season	League			FA Cup		League Cup		Other		Total	
Club	Season	Division	Apps	Goals	Apps	Goals	Apps	Goals	Apps	Goals	Apps	Goals
Bolton Wanderers	2014–15	Championship	0	0	0	0	0	0	0	0	0	0
Bolton Wanderers	2015–16	Championship	5	0	0	0	0	0	0	0	5	0
Blackpool (loan)	2014–15	Championship	10	0	0	0	0	0	0	0	10	0
Bury	2016–17	League One	17	0	1	0	1	1	3 (Note: Appearances in Football League Trophy)	0	22	1
Galway United	2017	Premier Division	5	0	—		—		0	0	5	0
AFC Telford United	2017–18	National League North	1	0	0	0	—		0	0	1	0
FC Halifax Town	2017–18	National League	9	0	0	0	—		0	0	9	0
FC Halifax Town	2018–19	National League	39	1	3	0	—		3 (Note: Appearances in FA Trophy)	0	45	1
FC Halifax Town	2019–20	National League	23	2	1	1	—		3	1	27	4
FC Halifax Town	2020–21	National League	37	1	1	0	—		2	0	40	1
FC Halifax Town	2021–22	National League	40	2	4	0	—		3 (Note: Two appearances in FA Trophy and one in National League Play-offs)	0	47	2
FC Halifax Town	Total		148	6	9	1	0	0	11	1	168	8
Grimsby Town	2022–23	League Two	35	3	6	0	0	0	3 (Note: Appearance(s) in the EFL Trophy)	0	44	3
Grimsby Town	2023–24	League Two	26	1	3	0	0	0	3	0	32	1
Grimsby Town	Total		61	4	9	0	0	0	6	0	76	4
Career total			247	10	19	1	1	1	20	1	287	13

== Honours ==
Individual

- National League Team of the Year: 2021–22
