= Irén Zságot =

Hungarian diver

Personal information
- Nationality: Hungarian
- Born: 8 February 1924 Budapest, Hungary
- Died: 26 January 1999 (aged 74) Budapest, Hungary

Sport
- Sport: Diving

Irén Zságot (8 February 1924 – 26 January 1999) was a Hungarian diver. She competed in the Women's 10 metre platform event at the 1948 Summer Olympics. She won the national championship 40 times and the Budapest championship 40 more times.
