= Carol Frick =

American diver

Personal information
- Full name: Carol Helen Frick
- Born: April 5, 1933 Queens, New York, United States
- Died: September 5, 2011 (aged 78) Marietta, Georgia, United States

Sport
- Sport: Diving

Carol Helen Frick (April 5, 1933 – September 5, 2011) was an American diver. She competed in the women's 3 metre springboard event at the 1952 Summer Olympics.
