= Margaret Bisbrown =

British diver

Personal information
- Full name: Lettice Margaret Everton Bisbrown
- Born: 8 June 1919 Runcorn, England
- Died: 20 October 2009 (aged 90) Melbourne, Florida, U.S.

Sport
- Country: Great Britain
- Sport: Diving

Lettice Margaret Everton Bisbrown (8 June 1919 – 20 October 2009) was a British diver. She competed in the women's 10 metre platform event at the 1948 Summer Olympics.

Bisbrown received a fine in November 1937 after being found guilty of driving "without due care and attention" which resulted in a crash. On 20 September 1941, Bisbrown, then described as the "champion woman diver of the North", married Arthur Day at Brook Road Methodist Chapel.
