= Madeleine Moreau =

French diver

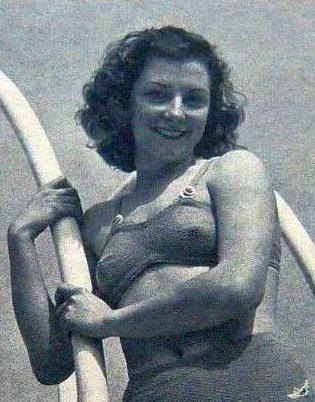
- Madeleine Moreau in 1948

Personal information
- Nickname: Mady
- Born: 1 May 1928 Hanoi, French Indochina
- Died: 10 June 1995 (aged 67) Chuelles, France

Sport
- Sport: Diving
- Event: 3-metre
Medal record
Women's diving
Representing France
Olympic Games
| Silver medal – second place | 1952 Helsinki | 3 m springboard |
European Championships
| Gold medal – first place | 1947 Monte Carlo | 3 m springboard |
| Gold medal – first place | 1950 Vienna | 3 m springboard |

Marie-Madeleine Cécile Moreau (1 May 1928 – 10 June 1995) was a French diver. She competed in the 1948 Summer Olympics and won a silver medal for France at the 1952 Summer Olympics, making her the first, and as of 2018, only French medallist in diving.

== Biography ==
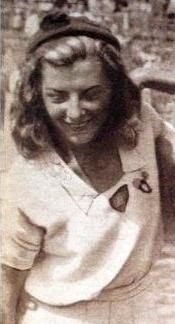
Moreau in 1947

Moreau was born in Hanoi, French Indochina. She died in Chuelles, France, at the age of 67. Moreau was a member of L'Isle-Adam Beach Club and competed frequently in L'Isle-Adam.

== Career ==
Along with the Olympics, Moreau competed in several diving championships. She competed at the Monte Carlo 1947 European Aquatics Championships in the 3-metre springboard. Moreau earned 100.43 points, placing first to win the gold medal at the age of nineteen.

Moreau also competed in the Vienna 1950 European Aquatics Championships in the same event. She won the gold medal for the second championship in a row. She beat her previous score, earning 155.58 points.

== 1948 Summer Games ==
Moreau made her Olympic debut in London at the 1948 Summer Olympics. She competed in the women's 3-metre springboard event and ranked seventh with a total score of 89.43 (41.76 in preliminary, 47.67 in second round).

== 1952 Summer Games ==
Moreau returned to the Olympics by competing in the 1952 Summer Games in Helsinki in the 3-metre springboard. She scored 139.34 points overall (67.65 in preliminary, 71.69 in second round) placing her second behind Patricia McCormick. Her silver medal made her the first non-American to win a medal in the women's 3 metre springboard since the inception of the event at the 1920 Summer Olympics.

Moreau is the only French athlete to win an Olympic medal in diving.
