= Arthur Gnahoua =

English-French professional footballer (born 1992)

Personal information
- Full name: Arthur Bertrand Gnahoua
- Date of birth: 5 April 1992 (age 34)
- Place of birth: Grenoble, France
- Height: 1.87 m (6 ft 2 in)
- Positions: Winger; centre-forward

Team information
- Current team: Southport

Youth career
- 2002–2003: Bolton Wanderers

Senior career*
Years	Team	Apps	(Gls)
2010–2012	Stalybridge Celtic	26	(2)
2012–2015	Macclesfield Town	34	(3)
2013	→ Colwyn Bay (loan)	5	(0)
2015–2016	CF Gavà		
2016–2017	Kidderminster Harriers	51	(16)
2017–2019	Shrewsbury Town	12	(1)
2018–2019	→ AFC Fylde (loan)	8	(2)
2019	Carlisle United	1	(0)
2019–2020	Macclesfield Town	29	(4)
2020–2021	Bolton Wanderers	28	(2)
2021–2023	Morecambe	55	(6)
2023–2024	Grimsby Town	24	(1)
2025-	Southport	3	(0)
- * Club domestic league appearances and goals as of 16:16, 22 May 2025 (UTC)

Arthur Bertrand Gnahoua (born 18 September 1992) is a French footballer who plays as a winger or centre-forward for Southport.

He has previously played in the Football League for Bolton Wanderers, Shrewsbury Town, Carlisle United, Macclesfield Town, Morecambe and Grimsby Town, as well as at non-League level for Stalybridge Celtic, Colwyn Bay, Kidderminster Harriers and AFC Fylde. He also spent a season playing in Spain with CF Gavà.

== Club career ==
Gnahoua was born in Grenoble, France and is of Ivorian descent. He moved to England when he was six and grew up in Salford. He was coached and taught how to play football by his brother. In 2003 he was released from the Bolton Wanderers Academy.

He began his senior career in non-league football, joining Macclesfield Town from Stalybridge Celtic in 2012. On 16 January 2015 he signed for CF Gavà and then moved on to Kidderminster Harriers in January 2016, and was their top goal scorer in the 2016–17 season as they reached the National League North play-off semi-finals.

He joined League One side Shrewsbury Town on a free transfer in May 2017, signing a one-year deal with an option for a further year, making his Football League debut on 5 August 2017 as a substitute in a 1−0 victory over Northampton Town. Gnahoua scored his first professional goal in a 3−2 victory over Coventry City in an EFL Trophy group-stage match on 29 August, followed by his first Football League goal - netting a 94th-minute winner in a 2−1 away win at Doncaster Rovers - on 26 September.

His contract with Shrewsbury was extended at the end of the 2017–18 season. He went on loan to Fylde on 26 November 2018.

He signed for Carlisle on 21 January 2019 but missed the rest of the season after getting injured only 27 minutes into his debut. He was released at the end of the season.

Gnahoua re-joined Macclesfield Town in August 2019 on a one-year contract.

Gnahoua re-signed for Bolton Wanderers on 26 September 2020, 17 years after being released from Bolton's Academy. He said he signed for Bolton as it was close to his home, which became an internet meme, with Bolton fans creating the chant "Arthur Gnahoua, he lives down the road!" They also gave him the nickname King Arthur. He made his debut the same day he signed, coming off the bench to replace Nathan Delfouneso in the 65th minute of a 0−2 Home defeat against Newport County. His first goal came on 17 November as he scored Bolton's second goal in a 3–2 win against Newcastle United U21 in the EFL Trophy with his first league goal coming on 13 January 2021 in a 1–1 draw against Exeter City. On 19 May 2021 Bolton announced he would be released at the end of his contract.

On 17 June 2021 newly promoted Morecambe announced they had signed him. Gnahoua signed a new one-year contract with the club in June 2022.

On 5 August 2023, Gnahoua signed for Grimsby Town on a one-year deal following a successful trial with the club. The move reunited him with his former Shrewsbury Town manager Paul Hurst. Gnahoua made his debut later that day as he came on as a 77th minute substitute for Charles Vernam in a 0–0 draw at home to AFC Wimbledon on the opening day of the 2023–24 season. He was released at the end of the 2023–24 season.

On 8 February 2025, Gnahoua signed for National League North club Southport on non-contract terms.

== Career statistics ==
As of 22 May 2025

Appearances and goals by club, season and competition
Club	Season	League			National Cup		League Cup		Other		Total	
Club	Season	Division	Apps	Goals	Apps	Goals	Apps	Goals	Apps	Goals	Apps	Goals
Stalybridge Celtic	2010–11	Conference North	2	1	0	0	–		0	0	2	1
Stalybridge Celtic	2011–12	Conference North	24	1	0	0	–		0	0	24	1
Macclesfield Town	2012–13	Conference	3	1	0	0	–		0	0	3	1
Colwyn Bay (loan)	2012–13	Conference North	5	0	0	0	–		0	0	5	0
Macclesfield Town	2013–14	Conference	10	0	0	0	–		1 (Note: Appearance(s) in FA Trophy)	0	11	0
Macclesfield Town	2014–15	Conference	21	2	2	0	–		1	0	24	2
CF Gavà	2014–15	Tercera División	?	?	?	?	?	?	?	?	?	?
CF Gavà	2015–16	Tercera División	?	?	?	?	?	?	?	?	?	?
Kidderminster Harriers	2015–16	National League	16	4	0	0	–		0	0	16	4
Kidderminster Harriers	2016–17	National League North	35	12	2	1	–		5 (Note: Appearance(s) in FA Trophy and National League North play-offs)	1	42	14
Shrewsbury Town	2017–18	League One	11	1	3	1	1	0	7 (Note: Appearance(s) in EFL Trophy)	1	22	3
Shrewsbury Town	2018–19	League One	1	0	0	0	0	0	2	0	3	0
Fylde (loan)	2018–19	National League	8	2	0	0	–		2	0	10	2
Carlisle United	2018–19	League Two	1	0	0	0	0	0	0	0	1	0
Macclesfield Town	2019–20	League Two	29	4	0	0	1	0	2	0	32	4
Bolton Wanderers	2020–21	League Two	28	2	0	0	0	0	2	1	30	3
Morecambe	2021–22	League One	34	5	2	0	1	0	3	0	40	5
Morecambe	2022–23	League One	24	1	1	0	1	1	3	0	29	2
Morecambe	Total		58	6	3	0	2	1	6	0	69	7
Grimsby Town	2023–24	League Two	24	1	1	2	1	0	3	0	29	3
Southport	2024–25	National League North	3	0	0	0	–		0	0	3	0
Career total			279	37	11	4	5	1	31	3	324	44

== Honours ==
Shrewsbury Town

- EFL Trophy runner-up: 2017–18

Bolton Wanderers

- EFL League Two third-place promotion: 2020–21
