= Jeannette Aubert =

French diver (1920–2004)

Jeannette Aubert-Pinci
Personal information
- Full name: Jeanne Julie Fulvia Aubert-Pinci
- Nationality: French
- Born: 16 June 1920 Paris, France
- Died: 8 October 2004 (aged 84) Nice, France

Sport
- Sport: Diving
Medal record
Women's diving
Representing France
European Championships
Bronze medal – third place	1947 Monte Carlo	3 m springboard

Jeannette Aubert-Pinci (16 June 1920 – 8 October 2004) was a French diver. She competed in the women's 3 metre springboard event at the 1948 Summer Olympics.
