= Zoe Ann Olsen-Jensen =

American diver

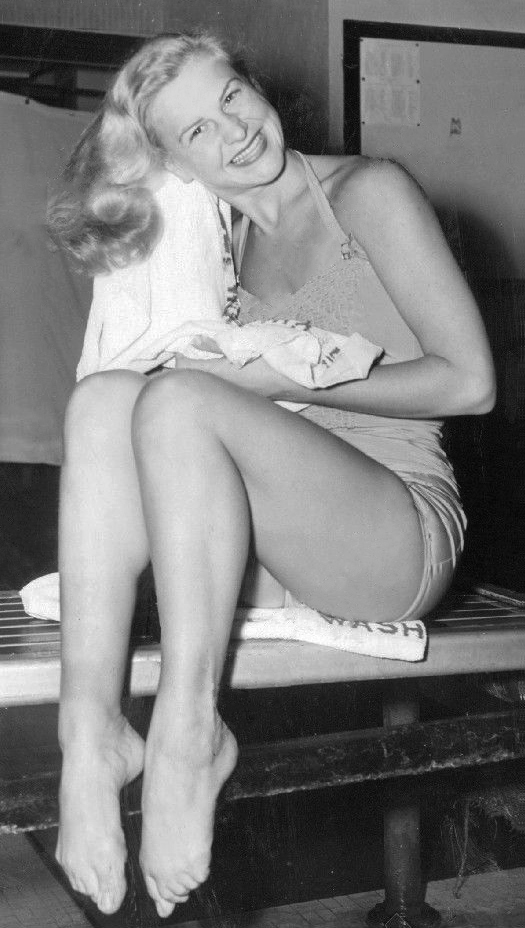
- Olsen in 1952

Personal information
- Born: February 11, 1931 Council Bluffs, Iowa, U.S.
- Died: September 23, 2017 (aged 86) Stuart, Florida, U.S.

Sport
- Sport: Diving
- Club: Athens Athletic Club, Oakland
Medal record
Representing the United States
Olympic Games
Silver medal – second place	1948 London	3 m springboard
Bronze medal – third place	1952 Helsinki	3 m springboard

Zoe Ann Olsen-Jensen (née Olsen; February 11, 1931 – September 23, 2017) was an American diver. She competed in the 3 m springboard at the 1948 and 1952 Olympics and won a silver and a bronze medal, respectively. During her career Olsen won 12 AAU diving titles, starting from 1945 as a 14-year-old. In 1949 she married the football and baseball player Jackie Jensen, and divorced him in 1968.

== Early years ==
Born in Council Bluffs, Iowa, Olsen-Jensen is the daughter of Art Olsen and Norma Bragstad Olsen. Her father was a coach and school principal; her mother taught swimming and was described as "a pioneer of synchronized swimming."

She attended La Porte School in La Porte City, Iowa, but she and her mother moved to Oakland, California, when her father enlisted for military service in World War II. In 1949, she graduated from Oakland High School, where she was president of her senior class and an honor student.

== Swimming ==
When she was 9 years old, Olsen-Jensen won first place in girls' and women's diving in an open swimming and diving competition in Neenah, Wisconsin. Olsen-Jensen won over 16 women divers and was the youngest of more than 100 participants in the Fox River Valley meet.

At age 11, Olsen-Jensen was the only two-event winner in Iowa's state Amateur Athletic Union swimming meet, finishing first in diving and the 40-yard freestyle junior race. When she was 12, she finished third in the national junior AAU championship competition.

In 1948, Olsen-Jensen won her first Olympic medal in springboard diving in London.

== Personal life ==
On October 16, 1949, Olsen-Jensen married Jackie Jensen, a member of the Boston Red Sox baseball team, in Oakland, California. They had a daughter and two sons. Olsen and Jensen divorced on May 18, 1963. They remarried on July 11, 1964, but divorced again on January 17, 1968. On September 18, 1972, she married Don Bramham.

== Recognition ==
Olsen-Jensen is a member of the Iowa Sports Hall of Fame. In three years, she was nominated for the James E. Sullivan Award, which goes to "the nation's outstanding amateur athlete, woman or man."

== See also ==
- List of members of the International Swimming Hall of Fame
