= Laura Conter =

Italian diver

Personal information
- Nationality: Italian
- Born: 29 November 1934 (age 90); Turin, Italy

Sport
- Sport: Diving

Laura Conter (born 29 November 1934) is an Italian diver. She competed in the women's 10 metre platform event at the 1960 Summer Olympics.
