= Vicki Draves =

American diver (1924–2010)

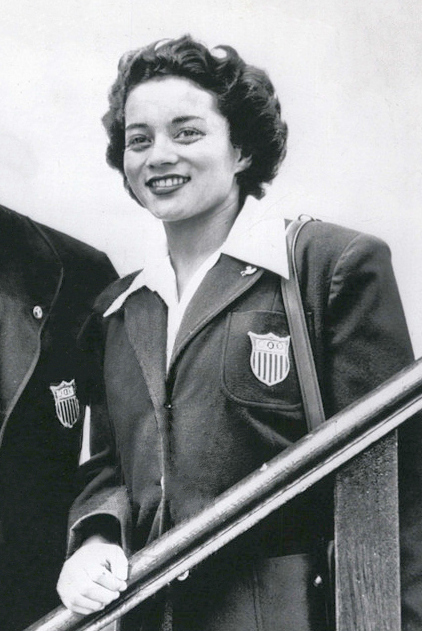
- Draves in 1948

Personal information
- Full name: Victoria Manalo Draves
- National team: United States
- Born: December 31, 1924 San Francisco, California, U.S.
- Died: April 11, 2010 (aged 85) Palm Springs, California, U.S.

Sport
- Sport: Diving
- Club: Los Angeles Athletic Club; Patterson School of Swimming and Diving
- Coached by: Jimmy Hughes, Phil Patterson, Lyle Draves
Medal record
Women's diving
Representing the United States
Olympic Games
Gold medal – first place	1948 London	3 m springboard
Gold medal – first place	1948 London	10 m platform

Victoria Manalo Draves (née Manalo; December 31, 1924 – April 11, 2010) was a Filipino American competitive diver who won gold medals in both platform and springboard diving at the 1948 Summer Olympics in London. Draves became the first woman to be awarded gold medals for both the ten-meter platform and the three-meter springboard. In a pioneering achievement, she was the first American woman to win two gold medals in diving, and the first Asian American to win Olympic gold medals. She was born in San Francisco.

== Early life and education ==
Manalo was born in the South-of-Market district of San Francisco to Philippine chef and musician Teofilo Manalo and English maid Gertrude Taylor. Her parents met and married in San Francisco. She grew up with her parents, her twin sister Connie, her older sister Frankie, and a younger brother, Sonny, who died as a child. Manalo couldn't afford to take swimming lessons until she was 10 years old and took summer swimming lessons from the Red Cross, paying five cents for admission to a pool in the Mission District. Draves played badminton, basketball, and softball in high school. She graduated from Commerce High School on Van Ness Avenue in 1942 and worked a temporary civil service job in the Army Port Surgeon's office to add to the family's meager income.

== Career ==
Manalo was introduced to diving at age 16 by Jack Lavery. It was Lavery who introduced her to Phil Patterson, swimming coach of the Fairmont Hotel Swimming and Diving Club. Due to racial discrimination and prejudice for being a Filipino, she changed her name to Vicki Taylor to be accepted in Patterson's school. Patterson's military stint during World War II caused Manalo to stop diving for a year. She instead found a job at the Presidio military base. Manalo later joined the swimming program at the Crystal Plunge in North Beach headed by Charlie Sava and was assigned Jimmy Hughes as her diving coach. Her 50–100 dive after-school practices continued even to her enrollment at San Francisco Junior College (now City College of San Francisco). At age 19, Coach Hughes guided her to a third-place finish in her first national AAU diving competition at the Indiana national meet in 1943.

At the 1944 national AAU championships, the men's 1942 platform champion, Sammy Lee, befriended her and introduced her to his coaching friend, Lyle Draves, who ran the swimming and diving program at the prestigious Athens Athletic Club in Oakland. Manalo then started training with Lyle Draves, adding platform diving to her springboard diving repertoire. Lyle Draves left the San Francisco Bay Area for Los Angeles in disgust at the racism in the Fairmont Hotel Swimming and Diving Club. Manalo commuted to Los Angeles, and placed second and third at the Outdoor Nationals. In 1945, on the death of her father, she returned to her old job as a secretary in the Army Port Surgeon's office in San Francisco.

When the war ended, Manalo finally moved to Southern California for good. She married her coach on July 12, 1946, and won the National Tower Diving Championship (10 meter platform), in 1946, 1947 and 1948. Prior to competing in the 1948 Olympics, Draves won a total of five United States diving championships. Despite not finishing first in either springboard or platform events of the Olympic trials in Detroit, Draves made the team.

On August 3, 1948, she won her first springboard title in the London Summer Olympics. Draves followed up that win with the gold medal in the 10-meter platform on Aug. 6, becoming the first woman to win both titles.

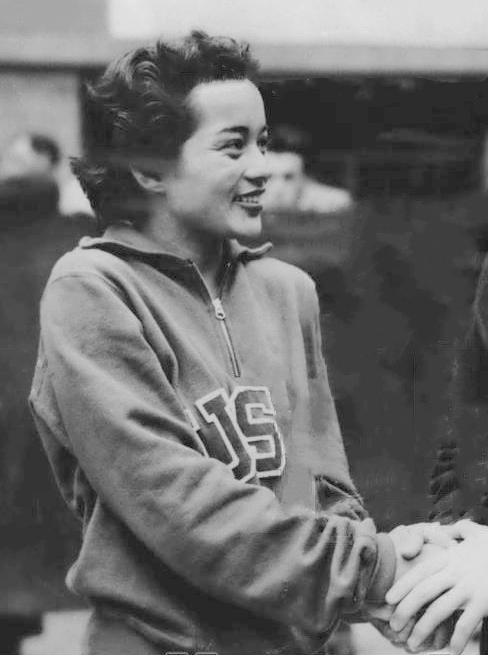
Draves in 1948

After her Olympic victory, the Manalo-Draves couple visited the Philippines for the first time upon the invitation from the Manila Jaycees. The 29-day visit to the Philippines had them staying in a Malacañang Palace suite and visiting her father's relatives in Orani, Bataan, where he was born. She gave platform diving exhibitions at the Rizal Stadium and in other Philippine venues, and also for Philippine president Elpidio Quirino. Draves appeared in a Life layout in 1949, being named one of the magazine's top two U.S. athletes at the 1948 Olympics.

Draves turned professional after the Olympics, joining Larry Crosby's "Rhapsody in Swimtime" aquatic show for her pro debut at Soldier Field in Chicago in 1948. She also performed in the L.A. Coliseum with headliner Esther Williams and the General Motors convention in Detroit. In 1949 and 1950, Draves toured the U.S., Canada, and Europe with Buster Crabbe's "Aqua Parade". After performing regularly in the Coachella Valley's El Mirador Hotel in Palm Springs and at the Shadow Mountain Resort & Club in Palm Desert, Draves retired from diving. In 1949, Al Sheehan recruited Callen to perform as part of the Aqua Follies, a water ballet show including diving acts.

After starting a family in the early 1950s in Glendale, Draves and her husband operated a swimming and diving training program at Indian Springs in Montrose and later moved the program to Encino. They continued to reside in Tarzana for 35 years, raising their four sons – David, Jeffery, Dale and Kim – to be skilled divers. Draves worked as a secretary while her husband remained a coach and swimming director.

== Later life and death ==
In the mid-1960s, Draves was an advocate for the Filipino Education Center when the second wave of Filipino immigrants came to America and largely settled in the South of Market district.

In 1968, she joined sprinter Jesse Owens, football player Tommy Harmon and race car driver Sam Hanks at the Sands Hotel in Las Vegas to help raise $700,000 for the City of Hope National Medical Center.

=== Honors ===
Draves was inducted into the International Swimming Hall of Fame in 1969.

In 2005, Draves was selected for the year's Most Outstanding Alumnus of City College of San Francisco. On May 27, 2005, she received her award and spoke at the commencement ceremonies of City College at the SF Masonic Auditorium. She received a resounding ovation from the 2000 graduating students in attendance. In the same year, she was acknowledged as one of Los Angeles Athletics Club's outstanding athletes.

In October 2006, a two-acre park (one acre per gold medal) in San Francisco was named Victoria Manalo Draves Park in her honor. It was on the same site, on Folsom and Sherman streets, where she had formerly attended Franklin Elementary School, four blocks from where she was born and raised.

Draves and her husband moved to Palm Springs, California in 1995. She died on April 11, 2010, aged 85, from pancreatic cancer aggravated by pneumonia.

== Legacy ==
On August 3, 2020, Draves was honored with a Google Doodle in recognition of her achievements.

== See also ==
- List of members of the International Swimming Hall of Fame
