= Kay Cuthbert =

British diver

Personal information
- Nationality: British
- Born: 6 February 1925; Willesden, England
- Died: 7 January 2017 (aged 91); Kendal, England

Sport
- Sport: Diving

Kathleen Rebecca Cuthbert (6 February 1925 – 7 January 2017) was a British diver. She competed in the women's 3 metre springboard event at the 1948 Summer Olympics.
