= Lenie Lanting-Keller =

Dutch diver (1925–1995)

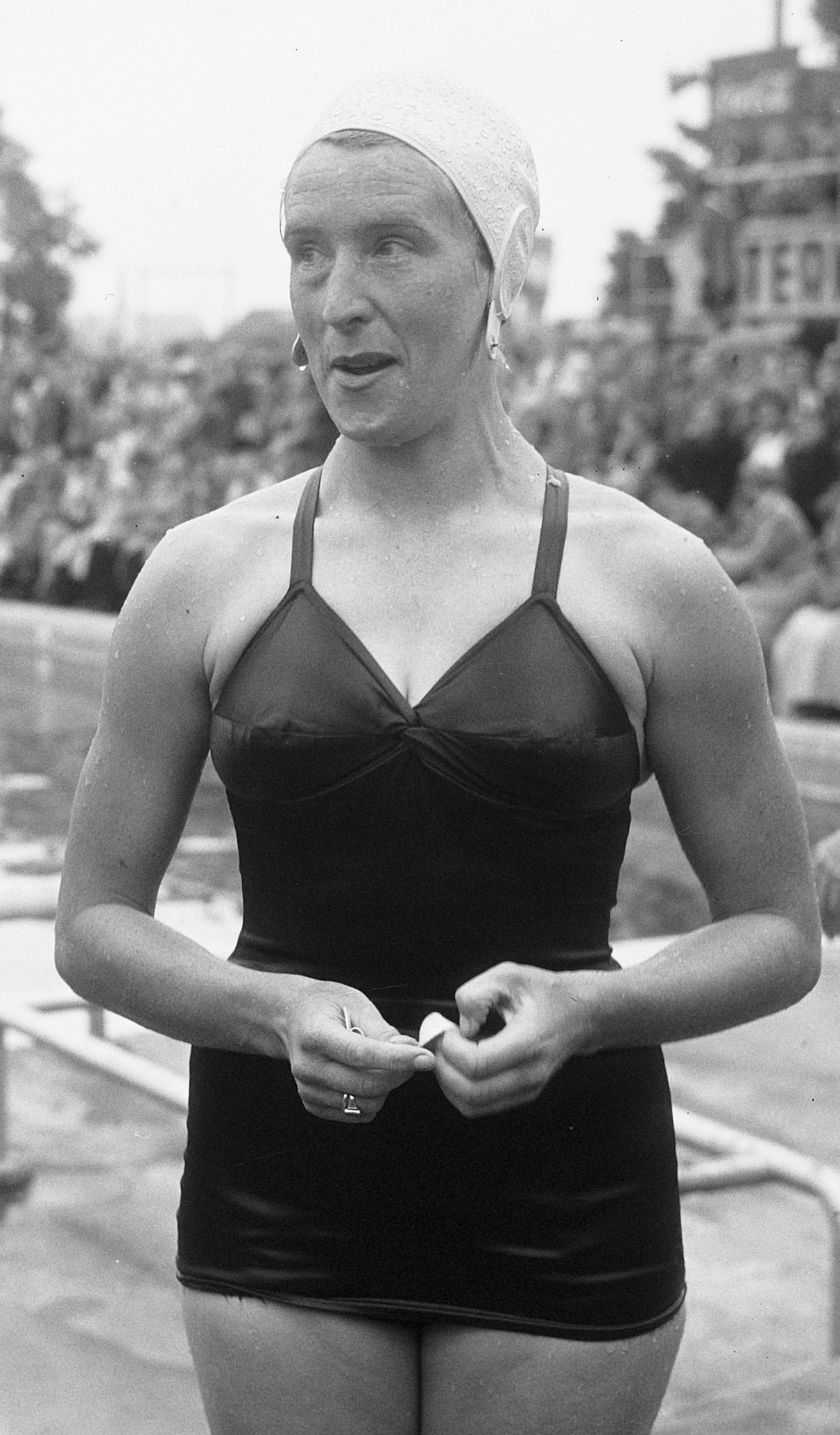
- Lenie Lanting-Keller in 1952

Personal information
- Born: 4 April 1925 Amsterdam, the Netherlands
- Died: 2 September 1995 (aged 70) Amsterdam, the Netherlands

Sport
- Sport: Diving
- Club: HDZ, Amsterdam

Helena Gerarda Catharina "Lenie" Lanting-Keller (4 April 1925 – 2 September 1995) was a Dutch diver. She competed at the 1952 Summer Olympics in the 3 m springboard and finished in 14th place.
