= Patsy Elsener =

American diver (1929–2019)

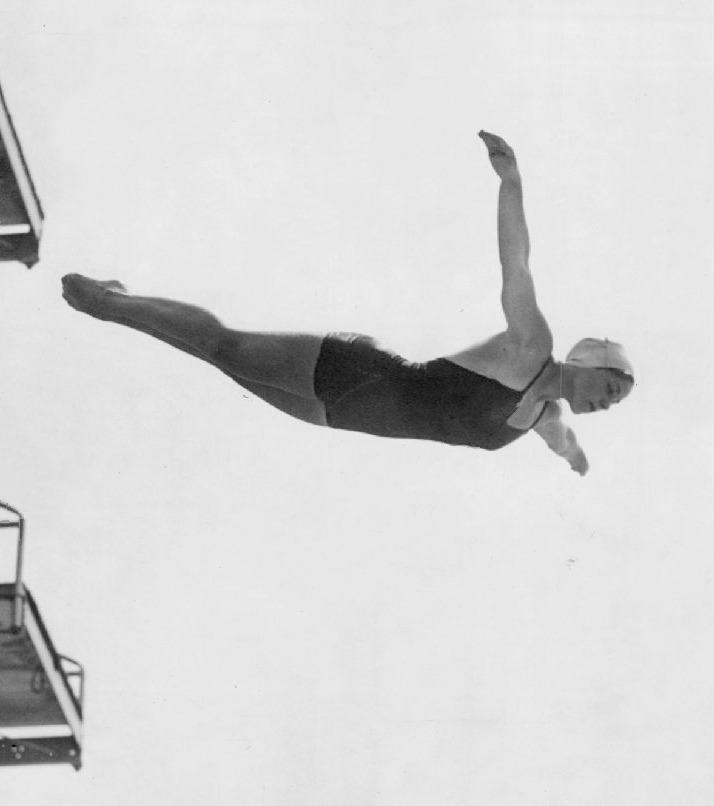
- Elsener in 1947

Personal information
- Full name: Patricia Anne Elsener
- Born: October 22, 1929 Oakland, California, U.S.
- Died: September 29, 2019 (aged 89)

Sport
- Sport: Diving
- Club: Crystal Plunge, San Francisco
Medal record
Representing United States
Olympic Games
Silver medal – second place	1948 London	10 m platform
Bronze medal – third place	1948 London	3 m springboard

Patricia Anne Elsener (October 22, 1929 – September 29, 2019) was an American diver. She won the AAU indoor 3 m springboard title in 1946 and 1947. At the 1948 Summer Olympics, she collected a silver medal in the 10-meter platform and a bronze in springboard.

== See also ==
- List of members of the International Swimming Hall of Fame
