= List of Pan American Games medalists in diving =

This is the complete list of Pan American Games medalists in diving from 1951 to 2019.

== Men's events ==
=== 1m springboard ===
| Year | Location | Gold | Silver | Bronze |
|---|---|---|---|---|
| 1991 | Havana | (United States) Mark Lenzi | (Cuba) Abel Ramírez | (Mexico) Jorge Mondragón |
| 1995 | Mar del Plata | (United States) Dean Panaro | (Mexico) Fernando Platas | (Cuba) Abel Ramírez |
| 2019 | Lima | (Mexico) Juan Celaya | (Jamaica) Yona Knight-Wisdom | (United States) Andrew Capobianco |

=== 3m springboard ===
| Year | Location | Gold | Silver | Bronze |
|---|---|---|---|---|
| 1951 | Buenos Aires | (Mexico) Joaquín Capilla | (United States) Miller Anderson | (United States) Sammy Lee |
| 1955 | Mexico City | (Mexico) Joaquín Capilla | (United States) Arthur Coffey | (United States) Bob Clotworthy |
| 1959 | Chicago | (United States) Gary Tobian | (United States) Sam Hall | (United States) Robert Webster |
| 1963 | São Paulo | (Canada) Thomas Dinsley | (United States) Richard Gilbert | (United States) Ken Sitzberger |
| 1967 | Winnipeg | (United States) Bernie Wrightson | (United States) Keith Russell | (Colombia) Raul Escobar |
| 1971 | Cali | (United States) Mike Finneran | (United States) Craig Lincoln | (Mexico) José Robinson |
| 1975 | Mexico City | (United States) Tim Moore | (United States) Phil Boggs | (Mexico) Carlos Girón |
| 1979 | San Juan | (United States) Greg Louganis | (United States) Phil Boggs | (Mexico) Carlos Girón |
| 1983 | Caracas | (United States) Greg Louganis | (Cuba) Abel Ramírez | (United States) David Burgering |
| 1987 | Indianapolis | (United States) Greg Louganis | (United States) Doug Shaffer | (Mexico) José Rocha |
| 1991 | Havana | (United States) Kent Ferguson | (United States) Mark Bradshaw | (Mexico) Jorge Mondragón |
| 1995 | Mar del Plata | (Mexico) Fernando Platas | (United States) Mark Bradshaw | (Canada) David Bédard |
| 1999 | Winnipeg | (United States) Mark Ruiz | (Mexico) Fernando Platas | (United States) Troy Dumais |
| 2003 | Santo Domingo | (Canada) Alexandre Despatie | (Mexico) Fernando Platas | (United States) Troy Dumais |
| 2007 | Rio de Janeiro | (Canada) Alexandre Despatie | (Brazil) César Castro | (United States) Troy Dumais |
| 2011 | Guadalajara | (Mexico) Yahel Castillo | (Mexico) Julian Sánchez | (Brazil) César Castro |
| 2015 | Toronto | (Mexico) Rommel Pacheco | (Mexico) Jahir Ocampo | (Canada) Philippe Gagné |
| 2019 | Lima | (Colombia) Daniel Restrepo | (Mexico) Juan Celaya | (Canada) Philippe Gagné |

=== 3m synchronized springboard ===
| Year | Location | Gold | Silver | Bronze |
|---|---|---|---|---|
| 2003 | Santo Domingo | (Canada) Alexandre Despatie and Philippe Comtois | (Cuba) Erick Fornaris and Jorge Betancourt | (United States) Troy Dumais and Justin Dumais |
| 2007 | Rio de Janeiro | (United States) Troy Dumais and Mitch Richeson | (Cuba) Erick Fornaris and Jorge Betancourt | (Canada) Alexandre Despatie and Arturo Miranda |
| 2011 | Guadalajara | (Mexico) Yahel Castillo and Julian Sánchez | (United States) Troy Dumais and Kristian Ipsen | (Cuba) René Hernandéz and Jorge Luis Pupo |
| 2015 | Toronto | (Mexico) Rommel Pacheco and Jahir Ocampo | (Canada) Philippe Gagné and François Imbeau-Dulac | (United States) Cory Bowersox and Zachary Nees |
| 2019 | Lima | (Mexico) Yahel Castillo and Juan Celaya | (Canada) Philippe Gagné and François Imbeau-Dulac | (United States) Michael Hixon and Andrew Capobianco |

=== 10m platform ===
| Year | Location | Gold | Silver | Bronze |
|---|---|---|---|---|
| 1951 | Buenos Aires | (Mexico) Joaquín Capilla | (United States) Sammy Lee | (United States) Miller Anderson |
| 1955 | Mexico City | (Mexico) Joaquín Capilla | (United States) Bob Clotworthy | (United States) Gary Tobian |
| 1959 | Chicago | (Mexico) Álvaro Gaxiola | (United States) Donald Harper | (Mexico) Juan Botella |
| 1963 | São Paulo | (United States) Bob Webster | (Mexico) Álvaro Gaxiola | (Mexico) Ricardo Capilla |
| 1967 | Winnipeg | (United States) Edwin Young | (Mexico) Luis de Rivera | (Colombia) Diego Henao |
| 1971 | Cali | (United States) Richard Earley | (United States) Richard Rydze | (Colombia) Diego Henao |
| 1975 | Mexico City | (Mexico) Carlos Girón | (United States) Tim Moore | (United States) Kent Vosler |
| 1979 | San Juan | (United States) Greg Louganis | (Mexico) Carlos Girón | (United States) Phil Boggs |
| 1983 | Caracas | (United States) Greg Louganis | (United States) Bruce Kimball | (Mexico) Ricardo Banuelos |
| 1987 | Indianapolis | (United States) Greg Louganis | (United States) Matt Scoggin | (Canada) David Bédard |
| 1991 | Havana | (Cuba) Roger Ramírez | (Mexico) Jesús Mena | (United States) Patrick Jeffrey |
| 1995 | Mar del Plata | (Mexico) Fernando Platas | (Mexico) Alberto Acosta | (United States) Patrick Jeffrey |
| 1999 | Winnipeg | (Mexico) Fernando Platas | (Cuba) José Guerra | (Mexico) Eduardo Rueda |
| 2003 | Santo Domingo | (Mexico) Rommel Pacheco | (Brazil) Cassius Duran | (Canada) Alexandre Despatie |
| 2007 | Rio de Janeiro | (Cuba) José Guerra | (Mexico) Rommel Pacheco | (Canada) Alexandre Despatie |
| 2011 | Guadalajara | (Mexico) Iván García | (Mexico) Rommel Pacheco | (Colombia) Sebastián Villa |
| 2015 | Toronto | (Mexico) Iván García | (Colombia) Víctor Ortega | (Mexico) Jonathan Ruvalcaba |
| 2019 | Lima | (Mexico) Kevin Berlín | (Mexico) Iván García | (Canada) Vincent Riendeau |

=== 10m synchronized platform ===
| Year | Location | Gold | Silver | Bronze |
|---|---|---|---|---|
| 2003 | Santo Domingo | (Canada) Alexandre Despatie and Philippe Comtois | (Mexico) Fernando Platas and Rommel Pacheco | (United States) Kyle Prandi and Mark Ruiz |
| 2007 | Rio de Janeiro | (United States) David Boudia and Thomas Finchum | (Cuba) Erick Fornaris and José Guerra | (Colombia) Juan Urán and Víctor Ortega |
| 2011 | Guadalajara | (Mexico) Iván García and Germán Sánchez | (Cuba) Jeinkler Aguirre and José Guerra | (Canada) Kevin Geyson and Eric Sehn |
| 2015 | Toronto | (Cuba) Jeinkler Aguirre and José Guerra | (Canada) Philippe Gagné and Vincent Riendeau | (Colombia) Víctor Ortega and Juan Guillermo Rios |
| 2019 | Lima | (Mexico) Iván García and Kevin Berlín | (Canada) Vincent Riendeau and Nathan Zsombor-Murray | (Brazil) Isaac Souza and Kawan Pereira |

== Women's events ==
=== 1m springboard ===
| Year | Location | Gold | Silver | Bronze |
|---|---|---|---|---|
| 1991 | Havana | (United States) Jill Schlabach | (United States) Alison Malsch | (Cuba) Mayte Garbey |
| 1995 | Mar del Plata | (Cuba) Mayte Garbey | (Canada) Annie Pelletier | (United States) Catherine Zarse |
| 2019 | Lima | (United States) Sarah Bacon | (United States) Brooke Schultz | (Mexico) Paola Espinosa |

=== 3m springboard ===
| Year | Location | Gold | Silver | Bronze |
|---|---|---|---|---|
| 1951 | Buenos Aires | (United States) Mary Cunningham | (United States) Pat McCormick | (United States) Dolores Castillo |
| 1955 | Mexico City | (United States) Pat McCormick | (United States) Jeanne Stunyo | (United States) Emily Houghton |
| 1959 | Chicago | (United States) Paula Jean Pope | (United States) Jean Lenzi | (United States) Barbara Sue Gilders |
| 1963 | São Paulo | (United States) Barbara McAlister | (Canada) Judy Stewart | (United States) Patsy Willard |
| 1967 | Winnipeg | (United States) Sue Gossick | (United States) Micki King | (United States) Kathy McDonald |
| 1971 | Cali | (Canada) Elizabeth Carruthers | (United States) Micki King | (Canada) Beverly Boys |
| 1975 | Mexico City | (United States) Jennifer Chandler | (Canada) Elizabeth Carruthers | (United States) Cynthia McIngvale |
| 1979 | San Juan | (United States) Denise Christensen | (United States) Janet Thorburn | (Canada) Janet Nutter |
| 1983 | Caracas | (United States) Kelly McCormick | (United States) Wendy Wyland | (Canada) Sylvie Bernier |
| 1987 | Indianapolis | (United States) Kelly McCormick | (United States) Megan Neyer | (Canada) Debbie Fuller |
| 1991 | Havana | (United States) Karen LaFace | (Canada) Paige Gordon | (Cuba) Mayte Garbey |
| 1995 | Mar del Plata | (Canada) Annie Pelletier | (United States) Melisa Moses | (Canada) Bobbi McPherson |
| 1999 | Winnipeg | (Canada) Eryn Bulmer | (United States) Jenny Lingamfelter | (Canada) Blythe Hartley |
| 2003 | Santo Domingo | (Canada) Blythe Hartley | (Canada) Émilie Heymans | (Brazil) Juliana Veloso |
| 2007 | Rio de Janeiro | (Mexico) Paola Espinosa | (Mexico) Laura Sánchez | (United States) Kelci Bryant |
| 2011 | Guadalajara | (Mexico) Laura Sánchez | (United States) Cassidy Krug | (Mexico) Paola Espinosa |
| 2015 | Toronto | (Canada) Jennifer Abel | (Canada) Pamela Ware | (Mexico) Dolores Hernández |
| 2019 | Lima | (Canada) Jennifer Abel | (Mexico) Dolores Hernández | (United States) Brooke Schultz |

=== 3m synchronized springboard ===
| Year | Location | Gold | Silver | Bronze |
|---|---|---|---|---|
| 2003 | Santo Domingo | (Canada) Émilie Heymans and Blythe Hartley | (Mexico) Laura Sánchez and Paola Espinosa | (United States) Sara Hildebrand and Cassandra Cardinell |
| 2007 | Rio de Janeiro | (Mexico) Laura Sánchez and Paola Espinosa | (United States) Ariel Rittenhouse and Kelci Bryant | (Canada) Meaghan Benfeito and Kelly MacDonald |
| 2011 | Guadalajara | (Mexico) Laura Sánchez and Paola Espinosa | (Canada) Jennifer Abel and Émilie Heymans | (United States) Cassidy Krug and Kassidy Cook |
| 2015 | Toronto | (Mexico) Paola Espinosa and Dolores Hernández | (Canada) Jennifer Abel and Pamela Ware | (United States) Deidre Freeman and Maren Taylor |
| 2019 | Lima | (Canada) Jennifer Abel and Pamela Ware | (United States) Brooke Schultz and Sarah Bacon | (Mexico) Paola Espinosa and Dolores Hernández |

=== 10m platform ===
| Year | Location | Gold | Silver | Bronze |
|---|---|---|---|---|
| 1951 | Buenos Aires | (United States) Pat McCormick | (Mexico) Carlota Ríos | (United States) Mary Cunningham |
| 1955 | Mexico City | (United States) Pat McCormick | (United States) Juno Stover-Irwin | (Mexico) Margarita Pesado |
| 1959 | Chicago | (United States) Paula Jean Pope | (United States) Juno Stover-Irwin | (United States) Tahiea Sparling |
| 1963 | São Paulo | (United States) Linda Cooper | (United States) Nancy Poulsen | (Mexico) María Adames |
| 1967 | Winnipeg | (United States) Lesley Bush | (Canada) Beverly Boys | (United States) Ann Peterson |
| 1971 | Cali | (Canada) Nancy Robertson | (Canada) Beverly Boys | (United States) Deborah Lipman |
| 1975 | Mexico City | (Canada) Janet Nutter | (United States) Janet Ely | (Canada) Linda Cuthbert |
| 1979 | San Juan | (United States) Barbara Weinstein | (United States) Janet Thorburn | (Canada) Linda Cuthbert |
| 1983 | Caracas | (United States) Wendy Wyland | (Argentina) Verónica Ribot | (Mexico) Guadalupe Canseco |
| 1987 | Indianapolis | (United States) Michele Mitchell | (Canada) Wendy Fuller | (Argentina) Verónica Ribot |
| 1991 | Havana | (United States) Eileen Richetelli | (United States) Alison Malsch | (Cuba) María Carmuza |
| 1995 | Mar del Plata | (Canada) Anne Montminy | (United States) Angela Trostel | (United States) Rebecca Ruehl |
| 1999 | Winnipeg | (Canada) Émilie Heymans | (Canada) Blythe Hartley | (Mexico) María Alcalá |
| 2003 | Santo Domingo | (Canada) Émilie Heymans | (Brazil) Juliana Veloso | (Canada) Blythe Hartley |
| 2007 | Rio de Janeiro | (Mexico) Paola Espinosa | (United States) Haley Ishimatsu | (Brazil) Juliana Veloso |
| 2011 | Guadalajara | (Mexico) Paola Espinosa | (Mexico) Tatiana Ortiz | (Canada) Meaghan Benfeito |
| 2015 | Toronto | (Mexico) Paola Espinosa | (Canada) Roseline Filion | (Canada) Meaghan Benfeito |
| 2019 | Lima | (Canada) Meaghan Benfeito | (Canada) Caeli McKay | (Mexico) Alejandra Orozco |

=== 10m synchronized platform ===
| Year | Location | Gold | Silver | Bronze |
|---|---|---|---|---|
| 2003 | Santo Domingo | (Canada) Émilie Heymans and Marie-Ève Marleau | (Mexico) Laura Sánchez and Paola Espinosa | (Cuba) Iohana Cruz and Yolanda Ortíz |
| 2007 | Rio de Janeiro | (Canada) Émilie Heymans and Marie-Ève Marleau | (Mexico) Tatiana Ortiz and Paola Espinosa | (United States) Haley Ishimatsu and Mary Beth Dunnichay |
| 2011 | Guadalajara | (Mexico) Tatiana Ortiz and Paola Espinosa | (Canada) Meaghan Benfeito and Roseline Filion | (Cuba) Yaima Rosario Mena and Annia Rivera |
| 2015 | Toronto | (Canada) Meaghan Benfeito and Roseline Filion | (Brazil) Ingrid Oliveira and Giovanna Pedroso | (Mexico) Paola Espinosa and Alejandra Orozco |
| 2019 | Lima | (Canada) Meaghan Benfeito and Caeli McKay | (Mexico) Alejandra Orozco and Gabriela Agúndez | (United States) Amy Cozad and Delaney Schnell |

== See also ==
- Diving at the Pan American Games
