= List of divers =

This is a list of divers, who competed on the international level:

Contents:	Top - A B C D E F G H I J K L M N O P Q R S T U V W X Y Z

== A ==
- Inga Afonina (Russia)
- Rafael Álvarez (Spain)
- Joakim Andersson (Sweden)
- Robert Andersson (Sweden)
- Jennifer Abel (Canada)

== B ==
- Jorge Betancourt (Cuba)
- Hobie Billingsley (United States)
- Myriam Boileau (Canada)
- Noemi Batki (Italy)
- Elena Bertocchi (Italy)

== C ==
- Franco Cagnotto (Italy)
- Tania Cagnotto (Italy)
- César Castro (Brazil)
- Jennifer Chandler (United States)
- Chen Ruolin (China)
- Philippe Comtois (Canada)
- Iohana Cruz (Cuba)
- Cao Yuan (China)

== D ==
- Thomas Daley (United Kingdom)
- Yasemin Dalkılıç (Turkey)
- Alexandre Despatie (Canada)
- Klaus Dibiasi (Italy)
- Alexander Dobroskok (Russia)
- Scott Donie (United States)
- Troy Dumais (United States)
- Cassius Duran (Brazil)

== E ==
- Janet Ely (United States)
- Paola Espinosa (Mexico)
- Dick Eve (Australia)

== F ==
- Heike Fischer (Germany)
- Erick Fornaris (Cuba)
- Fu Mingxia (China)
- Alejandra Fuentes (Venezuela)

== G ==
- Gao Min (China)
- Rebecca Gilmore (Australia)
- Daniel Goodfellow (United Kingdom)
- José Guerra (Cuba)
- Guo Jingjing (China)

== H ==
- Blythe Hartley (Canada)
- Mathew Helm (Australia)
- Émilie Heymans (Canada)
- Hu Jia (China)

== I ==
- Vera Ilyina (Russia)

== J ==
- Jia Tong (China)
- Edwin Jongejans (Netherlands)
- Daphne Jongejans (Netherlands)

== K ==
- Bruce Kimball (United States)
- Dick Kimball (United States)
- Albin Killat (Germany)
- Micki King (United States)
- Ditte Kotzian (Germany)
- Ulrika Knape (Sweden)
- Beatrice Kyle (United States)

== L ==
- Irina Lashko
- Mark Lenzi (United States)
- Lao Lishi (China)
- Anna Lindberg (Sweden)
- Li Na (China)
- Li Ting (China)
- Davide Lorenzini (Italy)
- Greg Louganis (United States)
- Wendy Lucero (United States)
- Igor Lukashin (Russia)

== M ==
- Pat McCormick (United States)
- Heiko Meyer (Germany)
- Yelena Miroshina (Soviet Union)
- Anne Montminy (Canada)
- Bobby Morgan (United Kingdom)

== N ==
- Yeoh Ken Nee (Malaysia)
- Chantelle Newbery (Australia)
- Robert Newbery (Australia)
- Bryan Nickson (Malaysia)
- Axel Norling (Sweden)

== O ==
- Yevgeniya Olshevskaya (Russia)
- Yolanda Ortíz (Cuba)

== P ==
- Rommel Pacheco (Mexico)
- Yuliya Pakhalina (Russia)
- Hugo Parisi (Brazil)
- Annie Pelletier (Canada)
- Peng Bo (China)
- Fernando Platas (Mexico)
- Dean Pullar (Australia)

== Q ==
- Qin Kai (China)
- Qiu Bo (China)

== R ==
- Aileen Riggin (United States)
- Axel Runström (Sweden)

== S ==
- Sang Xue (China)
- Sun Shuwei (China)
- Dmitri Sautin (Russia)
- Tobias Schellenberg (Germany)
- Conny Schmalfuss (Germany)
- Nora Subschinski (Germany)
- Jacqueline Schneider (Switzerland)
- Andrey Semenyuk (Soviet Union)
- E. Lee Spence (United States)

== T ==
- Leon Taylor (United Kingdom)
- Tian Liang (China)
- Vladimir Timoshinin (Russia)
- Svetlana Timoshinina (Russia)
- Hjördis Töpel (Sweden)
- Loudy Tourky (Australia)
- Tan Liangde (China)

== V ==
- Juliana Veloso (Brazil)

== W ==
- Peter Waterfield (United Kingdom)
- Bob Webster (United States)
- Andreas Wels (Germany)
- Ute Wetzig (Germany)
- Laura Wilkinson (United States)
- Melissa Wu (Australia)
- Wu Minxia (China)

== X ==
- Xiao Hailiang (China)
- Xiong Ni (China)

== Y ==
- Yang Jinghui (China)

== Z ==
- Zhou Jihong (China)
- Zhang Yanquan (China)
