= Diving at the 2011 Pan American Games – Women's synchronized 10 metre platform =

Women's synchronized 10 metre platform at the 2011 Pan American Games
- Venue: Scotiabank Aquatics Center
- Dates: October 27
- Competitors: 12 from 6 nations

Medalists
| Gold medal | Paola Espinosa; Tatiana Ortiz | Mexico |
| Silver medal | Meaghan Benfeito; Roseline Filion | Canada |
| Bronze medal | Yaima Mena; Annia Rivera | Cuba |

The women's synchronized 10 metre platform competition of the diving events at the 2011 Pan American Games was held on October 27 at the Scotiabank Aquatics Center. The defending Pan American Games champion were Émilie Heymans and Marie-Ève Marleau of Canada.

The synchronized diving competitions all consist of one rounds. All teams compete in a single round of six dives.

Eleven judges evaluate each dive, three each for each individual diver, and five for the synchronization, giving the diver/dive a score between 0 and 10 with increments of 0.5. The highest and lowest scores from each judge for each individual diver and the highest and lowest scores for synchronization are dropped. The remaining five scores are added together and multiplied by the degree of difficulty to get the raw score. The raw score is then multiplied by 0.6 to get the final score for the dive.

== Schedule ==
All times are Central Daylight Time (UTC-5).

| Day | Date | Start | Round |
|---|---|---|---|
| Day 14 | October 27 | 19:30 | Finals |

== Results ==
The final round was held on October 27.

| Rank | Divers | Nationality | Points |
|---|---|---|---|
| 1st place, gold medalist(s) | Paola Espinosa; Tatiana Ortiz | Mexico | 326.31 |
| 2nd place, silver medalist(s) | Meaghan Benfeito; Roseline Filion | Canada | 318.66 |
| 3rd place, bronze medalist(s) | Yaima Mena; Annia Rivera | Cuba | 269.28 |
| 4 | Amelia Cozad; Amy Korthauer | United States | 257.16 |
| 5 | María Betancourt; Lisette Ramirez | Venezuela | 229.86 |
| 6 | Natali Cruz; Andressa Mendes | Brazil | 226.71 |
