= Diving at the 2011 Pan American Games – Women's 3 metre springboard =

Women's 3 metre platform at the 2011 Pan American Games
- Venue: Scotiabank Aquatics Center
- Dates: October 28
- Competitors: 16 from 9 nations

Medalists
Gold medal	Laura Sanchez	Mexico
Silver medal	Cassidy Krug	United States
Bronze medal	Paola Espinosa	Mexico

The women's 3 metre springboard competition of the diving events at the 2011 Pan American Games was held on October 28 at the Scotiabank Aquatics Center. The defending Pan American Games champion was Paola Espinosa of Mexico. The winner of the competition (if not already qualified) will advance to compete at the 2012 Summer Olympics to be held in London, Great Britain.

The individual diving competitions all consist of two rounds. In the first, the divers each perform five dives. All divers advance to the advance to the finals. In the final round, the divers perform a final set of five dives, with the scores from those dives (and only those dives) used to determine final ranking.

Seven judges evaluate each dive, giving the diver a score between 0 and 10 with increments of 0.5; scores below 7.0 or above 9.5 are rare. The two highest and two lowest scores from each judge are dropped. The remaining three scores are summed, and multiplied by the degree of difficulty of the dive to give the total score for the dive. Scores from each dive in the round are summed to give the round score.

== Schedule ==
Date	Time	Round
October 28, 2011	10:00	Preliminaries
October 28, 2011	21:00	Finals

== Results ==
Green denotes finalists

Rank	Diver	Nationality	Preliminary		Final	
Rank	Diver	Nationality	Points	Rank	Points	Rank
1st place, gold medalist(s)	Laura Sanchez	Mexico	340.00	2	374.60	1
2nd place, silver medalist(s)	Cassidy Krug	United States	345.60	1	372.65	2
3rd place, bronze medalist(s)	Paola Espinosa	Mexico	303.50	4	356.20	3
4	Kassidy Cook	United States	274.70	7	348.90	4
5	Jennifer Abel	Canada	339.80	3	347.55	5
6	Juliana Veloso	Brazil	295.60	5	327.70	6
7	Émilie Heymans	Canada	288.50	6	325.90	7
8	Diana Pineda	Colombia	256.25	8	275.80	8
9	María Betancourt	Venezuela	225.75	11	270.00	9
10	Luisa Jimenez	Puerto Rico	223.95	12	250.30	10
11	Carolina Murillo	Colombia	242.30	9	239.65	11
12	Daylet Valdes	Cuba	228.15	10	221.30	12
13	Paula Sotomayor	Chile	194.80	13	–	–
14	Bruna Mangueira	Brazil	181.05	14	–	–
15	Yoslaidi Herrera	Cuba	149.00	15	–	–
	Beannelys Velasquez	Venezuela		DNF		
