= Diving at the 2011 Pan American Games – Women's synchronized 3 metre springboard =

Women's synchronized 10 metre platform at the 2011 Pan American Games
- Venue: Scotiabank Aquatics Center
- Dates: October 29
- Competitors: 12 from 6 nations

Medalists
Gold medal	Paola Espinosa; Laura Sánchez	Mexico
Silver medal	Jennifer Abel; Émilie Heymans	Canada
Bronze medal	Kassidy Cook; Cassidy Crug	United States

The women's 3 metre synchronized springboard competition of the diving events at the 2011 Pan American Games was held on October 29 at the Scotiabank Aquatics Center. The defending Pan American Games champion were Paola Espinosa and Laura Sánchez of Mexico.

== Schedule ==
All times are Central Daylight Time (UTC-5).

Day	Date	Start	Round
Day 16	October 29	19:30	Finals

== Results ==
The final round was held on October 27.

Rank	Divers	Nationality	Points
1st place, gold medalist(s)	Paola Espinosa; Laura Sánchez	Mexico	338.70
2nd place, silver medalist(s)	Jennifer Abel; Émilie Heymans	Canada	336.30
3rd place, bronze medalist(s)	Kassidy Cook; Cassidy Crug	United States	319.50
4	Yoslaidi Herrera; Daylet Valdes	Cuba	253.02
5	Wendy Espina; Paula Sotomayor	Chile	217.44
6	Andressa Mendes; Natali Cruz	Brazil	202.32
