= Diving at the 2003 Pan American Games =

The Diving Competition for men and women at the 2003 Pan American Games was held from August 6 to August 10, 2003, in Santo Domingo, Dominican Republic. There were four events each for men and women, after the inclusion of the Synchronized Springboard and Synchronized Platform events.

== Men's competition ==
=== 3m Springboard ===
- Held on Thursday August 7

Rank	Final	Score
Gold medal	Alexandre Despatie (CAN)	683.19
Silver medal	Fernando Platas (MEX)	675.48
Bronze medal	Troy Dumais (USA)	627.42
4.	César Castro (BRA)	610.56
5.	Jorge Betancourt (CUB)	609.57
6.	Mark Ruiz (USA)	608.16
7.	Arturo Miranda (CAN)	586.77
8.	Joel Rodriguez (MEX)	585.93
9.	Erick Fornaris (CUB)	583.62
10.	Ramon Fumado (VEN)	573.03
11.	Juan Urán (COL)	571.02
12.	Cassius Duran (BRA)	563.58
13.	Luis Villarroel (VEN)	529.29
14.	Johny Vera (COL)	483.03

=== 10m Platform ===
- Held on Saturday August 9

Rank	Final	Score
Gold medal	Rommel Pacheco (MEX)	667.86
Silver medal	Cassius Duran (BRA)	634.59
Bronze medal	Alexandre Despatie (CAN)	626.37
4.	Justin Dumais (USA)	625.86
5.	Erick Fornaris (CUB)	610.68
6.	Mark Ruiz (USA)	609.51
7.	Jesús Aballi (CUB)	593.70
8.	Juan Urán (COL)	558.54
9.	Christopher Kalec (CAN)	551.55
10.	Ubirajara Barbosa (BRA)	531.90
11.	Johny Vera (COL)	456.90

=== 3m Synchronized Springboard ===
- Held on Saturday August 10

Rank	Final	Score
Gold medal	Canada • Alexandre Despatie • Philippe Comtois	317.40
Silver medal	Cuba • Erick Fornaris • Jorge Betancourt	313.83
Bronze medal	United States • Troy Dumais • Justin Dumais	313.35
4.	Mexico • Fernando Platas • Joel Rodríguez	309.96
5.	Brazil • César Castro • Cassius Duran	302.91
6.	Venezuela • Ramón Fumado • Luis Villaroel	300.12

=== 10m Synchronized Platform ===
- Held on Friday August 8

Rank	Final	Score
Gold medal	Canada • Alexandre Despatie • Philippe Comtois	340.44
Silver medal	Mexico • Fernando Platas • Rommel Pacheco	327.09
Bronze medal	United States • Kyle Prandi • Mark Ruiz	320.52
4.	Cuba • Erick Fornaris • Jorge Betancourt	312.90

== Women's competition ==
=== 3m Springboard ===
- Held on Friday August 8

Rank	Final	Score
Gold medal	Blythe Hartley (CAN)	504.63
Silver medal	Émilie Heymans (CAN)	502.17
Bronze medal	Juliana Veloso (BRA)	482.22
4.	Laura Sánchez (MEX)	478.29
5.	Michelle Davison (USA)	469.29
6.	Iohana Cruz (CUB)	452.25
7.	Sara Hildebrand (USA)	449.73
8.	Jashia Luna (MEX)	448.56
9.	Angelique Rodriguez (PUR)	437.34
10.	Diana Pineda (COL)	423.81
11.	Milena Sae (BRA)	386.55
12.	Katura Horton-Perinchief (BER)	383.76
13.	Carolyn Gutiérrez (DOM)	305.13

=== 10m Platform ===
- Held on Saturday August 9

Rank	Final	Score
Gold medal	Émilie Heymans (CAN)	568.44
Silver medal	Juliana Veloso (BRA)	503.85
Bronze medal	Blythe Hartley (CAN)	474.81
4.	Angelique Rodríguez (PUR)	470.64
5.	Laura Wilkinson (USA)	453.99
6.	Sara Hilldebrand (USA)	450.09
7.	Jashia Luna (MEX)	441.72
8.	Paola Espinosa (MEX)	431.43
9.	Diana Pineda (COL)	418.05
10.	Yolanda Ortiz (CUB)	416.04
11.	Carolyn Gutiérrez (DOM)	301.71
12.	Katura Horton-Perinchief (BER)	299.91

=== 3m Springboard Synchronized ===
- Held on Sunday August 10

Rank	Final	Score
Gold medal	Canada • Émilie Heymans • Blythe Hartley	298.62
Silver medal	Mexico • Laura Sánchez • Paola Espinosa	275.70
Bronze medal	United States • Sara Hildebrand • Cassandra Cardinell	250.50
4.	Cuba • Iohana Cruz • Yolanda Ortíz	248.55
5.	Brazil • Juliana Veloso • Milena Sae	222.96

=== 10m Synchronized Platform ===
- Held on Thursday August 7

Rank	Final	Score
Gold medal	Canada • Émilie Heymans • Marie-Ève Marleau	310.95
Silver medal	Mexico • Laura Sánchez • Paola Espinosa	278.70
Bronze medal	Cuba • Iohana Cruz • Yolanda Ortíz	264.78
4.	United States • Sara Hildebrand • Cassandra Cardinell	262.32
5.	Brazil • Milena Sae • Juliana Veloso	219.99

== Medal table ==
Place	Nation	Gold medal	Silver medal	Bronze medal	Total
1	Canada	7	1	2	10
2	Mexico	1	4	0	5
3	Brazil	0	2	1	3
4	Cuba	0	1	1	2
5	United States	0	0	4	4
Total		8	8	8	24

== See also ==
- Diving at the 2004 Summer Olympics
