= Diving at the 2011 Pan American Games – Women's 10 metre platform =

Women's 10 metre platform at the 2011 Pan American Games
- Venue: Scotiabank Aquatics Center
- Dates: October 26
- Competitors: 12 from 7 nations

Medalists
Gold medal	Paola Espinosa	Mexico
Silver medal	Tatiana Ortiz	Mexico
Bronze medal	Meaghan Benfeito	Canada

The women's 10 metre platform competition of the diving events at the 2011 Pan American Games will be held on October 26 at the Scotiabank Aquatics Center. The defending Pan American Games champion is Paola Espinosa of Mexico. The winner of the competition (if not already qualified) will advance to compete at the 2012 Summer Olympics to be held in London, Great Britain.

The individual diving competitions all consist of two rounds. In the first, the divers each perform five dives. All divers advance to the advance to the finals. In the final round, the divers perform a final set of five dives, with the scores from those dives (and only those dives) used to determine final ranking.

Seven judges evaluate each dive, giving the diver a score between 0 and 10 with increments of 0.5; scores below 7.0 or above 9.5 are rare. The two highest and two lowest scores from each judge are dropped. The remaining three scores are summed, and multiplied by the degree of difficulty of the dive to give the total score for the dive. Scores from each dive in the round are summed to give the round score.

== Schedule ==
Date	Time	Round
October 27, 2011	10:00	Preliminaries
October 27, 2011	21:00	Finals

== Results ==
12 athletes from 7 countries competed.

Rank	Diver	Nationality	Preliminary		Final	
Rank	Diver	Nationality	Points	Rank	Points	Rank
1st place, gold medalist(s)	Paola Espinosa	Mexico	340.15	2	370.60	1
2nd place, silver medalist(s)	Tatiana Ortiz	Mexico	345.10	1	369.05	2
3rd place, bronze medalist(s)	Meaghan Benfeito	Canada	321.30	4	358.20	3
4	Roseline Filion	Canada	322.50	3	345.65	4
5	Andressa Mendes	Brazil	253.05	10	279.95	5
6	María Betancourt	Venezuela	293.85	6	274.10	6
7	Annia Rivera	Cuba	268.35	8	267.90	7
8	Carolina Murillo	Colombia	253.80	9	262.55	8
9	Amy Korthauer	United States	309.05	5	262.00	9
10	Amelia Cozad	United States	279.30	7	260.60	10
11	Lisette Ramirez	Venezuela	216.95	12	242.00	11
12	Natali Cruz	Brazil	225.75	11	219.00	12
