= Diving at the 2007 Pan American Games =

This page shows the results of the Diving Competition for men and women at the 2007 Pan American Games, held from July 25 to July 28, 2007 in Rio de Janeiro, Brazil. There were a total number of four events, for both men and women.

== Men's results ==
=== 3m Springboard ===
RANK	FINAL	SCORE
Gold medal	Alexandre Despatie (CAN)	503.65
Silver medal	César Castro (BRA)	492.70
Bronze medal	Troy Dumais (USA)	484.25
4.	Jorge Betancourt (CUB)	453.75
5.	Juan Urán (COL)	447.00
6.	Rommel Pacheco (MEX)	435.40
7.	Mitch Richeson (USA)	429.80
8.	Yahel Castillo (MEX)	425.75
9.	Luis Villarroel (VEN)	419.90
10.	Jorge Pupo (CUB)	385.50
11.	Emilio Colmenares (VEN)	373.50
12.	Cassius Duran (BRA)	364.80
13.	Reuben Ross (CAN)	307.30

=== 10m Platform ===
RANK	FINAL	SCORE
Gold medal	José Guerra (CUB)	527.40
Silver medal	Rommel Pacheco (MEX)	510.15
Bronze medal	Alexandre Despatie (CAN)	505.80
4.	Juan Urán (COL)	470.40
5.	Hugo Parisi (BRA)	456.60
6.	Thomas Finchum (USA)	454.10
7.	Cassius Duran (BRA)	423.40
8.	Riley McCormick (CAN)	407.15
9.	Víctor Ortega (COL)	404.25
10.	David Boudia (USA)	399.20
11.	Giann Tejada (MEX)	395.00
12.	Jorge Pupo (CUB)	365.45

=== 3m Springboard Synchronized ===
RANK	FINAL	SCORE
Gold medal	United States • Troy Dumais • Mitch Richeson	422.52
Silver medal	Cuba • Erick Fornaris • Jorge Betancourt	407.10
Bronze medal	Canada • Alexandre Despatie • Arturo Miranda	401.40
4.	Venezuela • Emilio Colmenares • Ramon Fumado	383.16
5.	Mexico • Luis Huerta • Yahel Castillo	380.79
6.	Brazil • Cassius Duran • César Castro	373.98

=== 10m Platform Synchronized ===
RANK	FINAL	SCORE
Gold medal	United States • David Boudia • Thomas Finchum	437.64
Silver medal	Cuba • Erick Fornaris • José Guerra	421.91
Bronze medal	Colombia • Juan Urán • Víctor Ortega	416.10
4.	Brazil • Cassius Duran • Hugo Parisi	415.41
5.	Canada • Reuben Ross • Riley McCormick	401.73
6.	Mexico • Yahel Castillo • Rommel Pacheco	395.46

== Women's competition ==
=== 3m Springboard ===
RANK	FINAL	SCORE
Gold medal	Paola Espinosa (MEX)	361.20
Silver medal	Laura Sánchez (MEX)	347.45
Bronze medal	Kelci Bryant (USA)	344.15
4.	Juliana Veloso (BRA)	326.90
5.	Ariel Rittenhouse (USA)	318.15
6.	Meaghan Benfeito (CAN)	289.65
7.	Jocelyn Castillo (VEN)	285.20
8.	Diana Pineda (COL)	273.85
9.	Alejandra Fuentes (VEN)	268.20
10.	Yaima Mena (CUB)	268.15
11.	Milena Sae (BRA)	249.70
12.	Kelly MacDonald (CAN)	248.25

=== 10m Platform ===
RANK	FINAL	SCORE
Gold medal	Paola Espinosa (MEX)	380.95
Silver medal	Haley Ishimatsu (USA)	364.60
Bronze medal	Juliana Veloso (BRA)	356.25
4.	Émilie Heymans (CAN)	348.20
5.	Tatiana Ortiz (MEX)	340.90
6.	Marie-Ève Marleau (CAN)	326.60
7.	Mary Beth Dunnichay (USA)	309.60
8.	Yaima Mena (CUB)	285.75
9.	Diana Pineda (COL)	270.10
10.	Milena Sae (BRA)	267.40
11.	Yolanda Ortiz (CUB)	263.15
12.	Kiara Buelvas (VEN)	261.80

=== 3m Springboard Synchronized ===
RANK	FINAL	SCORE
Gold medal	Mexico • Laura Sánchez • Paola Espinosa	307.80
Silver medal	United States • Ariel Rittenhouse • Kelci Bryant	305.10
Bronze medal	Canada • Meaghan Benfeito • Kelly MacDonald	276.60
4.	Brazil • Juliana Veloso • Tammy Takagi	273.30
5.	Venezuela • Jocelyn Castillo • Laurent Perez	261.39
6.	Cuba • Daile Valdes • Yaima Mena	246.72

=== 10m Platform Synchronized ===
RANK	FINAL	SCORE
Gold medal	Canada • Émilie Heymans • Marie-Ève Marleau	327.30
Silver medal	Mexico • Tatiana Ortiz • Paola Espinosa	325.14
Bronze medal	United States • Haley Ishimatsu • Mary Beth Dunnichay	297.54
4.	Cuba • Yolanda Ortiz • Yaima Mena	266.49
5.	Brazil • Evelyn Winkler • Milena Sae	265.95

== Medal table ==
Place	Nation	Gold medal	Silver medal	Bronze medal	Total
1	Mexico	3	3	0	6
2	United States	2	2	3	7
3	Canada	2	0	3	5
4	Cuba	1	2	0	3
5	Brazil	0	1	1	2
6	Colombia	0	0	1	1
Total		8	8	8	24

== See also ==
- Diving at the 2008 Summer Olympics
