= Diving at the 2010 South American Games – Men's 3 m springboard =

The Men's 3m Springboard event at the 2010 South American Games was held on March 20 at 13:00.

== Medalists ==
Gold	Silver	Bronze
Juan Guillermo Uran Salazar; Colombia	Sebastian Castañeda; Colombia	Ian Matos; Brazil

== Results ==
Rank	Athlete	Dives						Result
Rank	Athlete	1	2	3	4	5	6	Result
1st place, gold medalist(s)	Juan Guillermo Uran Salazar (COL)	69.00	74.40	74.25	69.00	61.50	69.70	417.85
2nd place, silver medalist(s)	Sebastian Castañeda (COL)	69.00	68.20	71.40	67.50	61.25	68.00	405.35
3rd place, bronze medalist(s)	Ian Matos (BRA)	66.00	66.00	63.55	63.00	61.50	67.65	387.70
4	Diego Saavedra (CHI)	58.50	44.80	40.50	23.80	40.60	58.80	267.00
5	Donato Escudero (CHI)	37.80	28.50	57.00	40.80	43.40	14.00	221.50
