= Diving at the 2010 South American Games – Men's 10 m synchro platform =

The Men's 10m Synchronized Platform event at the 2010 South American Games was held on March 21 at 13:00.

== Medalists ==
Gold	Silver	Bronze
Juan Guillermo Uran Salazar; Victor Hugo Serna; Colombia	Hugo Parisi; Rui Marinho; Brazil	Diego Saavedra; Donato Escudero; Chile

== Results ==
Rank	Athlete	Dives						Result
Rank	Athlete	1	2	3	4	5	6	Result
1st place, gold medalist(s)	Colombia; Juan Guillermo Uran Salazar; Victor Hugo Serna	55.20	56.40	77.76	85.44	83.16	85.14	443.10
2nd place, silver medalist(s)	Brazil; Hugo Parisi; Rui Marinho	45.60	50.40	78.72	78.72	81.18	63.36	397.98
3rd place, bronze medalist(s)	Chile; Diego Saavedra; Donato Escudero	43.20	37.20	45.36	53.28	47.25	0.00	226.29
