= Diving at the 2010 South American Games – Women's 1 m springboard =

The Women's 1m Springboard event at the 2010 South American Games was held on March 20 at 14:15.

== Medalists ==
Gold	Silver	Bronze
Diana Isabel Zuleta; Colombia	Juliana Veloso; Brazil	Milena Sae; Brazil

== Results ==
Rank	Athlete	Dives					Result
Rank	Athlete	1	2	3	4	5	Result
1st place, gold medalist(s)	Diana Isabel Zuleta (COL)	56.40	54.60	48.00	55.20	58.50	272.70
2nd place, silver medalist(s)	Juliana Veloso (BRA)	54.60	47.15	43.20	56.40	58.50	259.85
3rd place, bronze medalist(s)	Milena Sae (BRA)	44.85	49.20	43.75	46.80	50.40	235.00
4	Manuela Rios Lemus (COL)	46.80	50.70	44.85	38.85	42.00	223.20
5	Norka Gutierrez (ECU)	43.20	36.80	46.80	50.40	42.50	219.70
6	Paula Sotomayor Godoy (CHI)	46.80	39.10	31.50	31.20	35.70	184.30
7	Rafaela Fernanda Ramos (ECU)	46.80	44.40	31.05	24.00	29.40	175.65
8	Wendy Esquivel (CHI)	22.95	23.40	21.25	40.70	39.00	147.30
