= Diving at the 2010 South American Games – Men's 3 m synchro springboard =

The Men's 3m Synchronized Springboard event at the 2010 South American Games was held on March 20 at 15:30.

== Medalists ==
Gold	Silver	Bronze
Juan Guillermo Uran Salazar; Victor Hugo Serna; Colombia	Diego Saavedra; Donato Escudero; Chile	Ian Matos; Rui Machado; Brazil

== Results ==
Rank	Athlete	Dives						Result
Rank	Athlete	1	2	3	4	5	6	Result
1st place, gold medalist(s)	Colombia; Juan Guillermo Uran Salazar; Victor Hugo Serna	49.80	51.60	72.90	81.84	73.80	74.70	404.64
2nd place, silver medalist(s)	Chile; Diego Saavedra; Donato Escudero	45.60	42.60	55.80	51.84	42.84	61.32	300.00
3rd place, bronze medalist(s)	Brazil; Ian Matos; Rui Machado	40.80	42.00	44.64	56.70	69.30	36.63	290.07
