= CAMO =

CAMO, short for Club Aquatique de Montreal (French: [klyb akatik də mɔ̃ʁeal]), is a swim club based in Montreal, Quebec, Canada's Complexe sportif Claude-Robillard.

CAMO operates in three areas: swimming, diving, and water polo however, CAMO has had the greatest success in diving.

== Swimming ==
CAMO Natation and its Centre national de natation de Montréal train elite competitive swimmers.

=== Noted CAMO swimmers ===
- Audrey Lacroix
- Marianne Limpert

== Diving ==
CAMO's diving club (Le Club de Plongeon CAMO) was formed in 1981 as an official club operated by the City of Montreal. It originally was created to form divers at the "junior" level. Its first major success occurred in 1983 when Sylvie Bernier joined the club. The following year Bernier became the first Canadian to ever win a gold medal in diving, at the 1984 Summer Olympics in Los Angeles.

The next major highlight in the diving club's history came at the 1992 Summer Olympics in Barcelona, Spain. There two of its members, Évelyne Boisvert and Bruno Founier, were members of the Canadian team.

Since that time, CAMO’s diving club has maintained its position as one of Canada’s most successful programs at both junior and senior levels.

Since 1998 its International CAMO Invitational, a world-calibre diving event, has attracted major diving stars from around the world to Complexe sportif Claude-Robillard every year.

=== Noted CAMO divers ===
- Sylvie Bernier
- Myriam Boileau
- Philippe Comtois
- Alexandre Despatie
- Blythe Hartley
- Annie Pelletier

== Water polo ==
Complexe sportif Claude-Robillard has been the host of Club CAMO Water Polo since the 1976 Summer Olympics. The club has won a number of provincial and Canadian championships over the years. Many members of the club have also been placed on various Canadian national water polo teams.
