= Diving at the 2003 Summer Universiade =

The Diving competition in the 2003 Summer Universiade were held in Daegu, South Korea.

== Medal overview ==
=== Men's events ===
| Event | Gold | Silver | Bronze |
|---|---|---|---|
| 1 metre Springboard | Wang Feng (CHN) | Wang Tianling (CHN) | Tobias Schellenberg (GER) |
| 3 metre Springboard | Wang Tianling (CHN) | Wang Kenan (CHN) | Ken Terauchi (JPN) |
| 10 metre Platform | Tian Liang (CHN) | Hu Jia (CHN) | Choe Hyung-Gil (PRK) |
| Synchronized Springboard | Peng Bo & Wang Kenan (CHN) | Jorge Martínez & Omar Ojeda (MEX) | Massimiliano Mazzucchi & Christopher Sacchin (ITA) |
| Synchronized Platform | Tian Liang & Yang Jinghui (CHN) | Pak Yong-Ryong & Choe Hyong-Gil (PRK) | Cho Kwan-Hoon & Kwon Kyung-Min (KOR) |
| Team Trophy | China (CHN) | Mexico (MEX) | South Korea (KOR) |

=== Women's events ===
| Event | Gold | Silver | Bronze |
|---|---|---|---|
| 1 metre Springboard | Wu Minxia (CHN) | Guo Jingjing (CHN) | Natalya Umyskova (RUS) |
| 3 metre Springboard | Wu Minxia (CHN) | Guo Jingjing (CHN) | Ditte Kotzian (GER) |
| 10 metre Platform | Li Na (CHN) | Zhang Jun (CHN) | Sara Hildebrand (USA) |
| Synchronized Springboard | Wu Minxia & Guo Jingjing (CHN) | Ditte Kotzian & Conny Schmalfuss (GER) | Cassandra Cardinell & Sara Hildebrand (USA) |
| Synchronized Platform | Zhang Jun & Sun Na (CHN) | Chon Hyon-Ju & Kim Gyung-Ju (PRK) | Cassandra Cardinell & Sara Hildebrand (USA) |
| Team Trophy | China (CHN) | United States (USA) | North Korea (PRK) |

== Medal table ==
* Host nation (South Korea)

| Rank | Nation | Gold | Silver | Bronze | Total |
|---|---|---|---|---|---|
| 1 | China | 12 | 6 | 0 | 18 |
| 2 | North Korea | 0 | 2 | 2 | 4 |
| 3 | Mexico | 0 | 2 | 0 | 2 |
| 4 | United States | 0 | 1 | 3 | 4 |
| 5 | Germany | 0 | 1 | 2 | 3 |
| 6 | South Korea* | 0 | 0 | 2 | 2 |
| 7 | Italy | 0 | 0 | 1 | 1 |
| 7 | Japan | 0 | 0 | 1 | 1 |
| 7 | Russia | 0 | 0 | 1 | 1 |
| Totals (9 entries) | | 12 | 12 | 12 | 36 |
