= Diving at the 2006 Central American and Caribbean Games =

- Location: Cartagena, Colombia
- Dates: 15–30 July

The Diving competition at the 2006 Central American and Caribbean Games was held in Cartagena, Colombia. The tournament was scheduled to be held from 15–30 July 2006.

== Medal summary ==
=== Men's events ===
Event	Gold		Silver		Bronze	
1 m springboard	Erick Fornaris (CUB)	395.55	Rommel Pacheco (MEX)	377.60	Luis Villarroel (VEN)	368.95
3 m springboard	Jose Guerra (CUB)	455.95	Rommel Pacheco (MEX)	445.00	Juan Uran (COL)	415.55
10 m platform	Jose Guerra (CUB)	556.35	Juan Uran (COL)	486.40	Rommel Pacheco (MEX)	485.90

=== Women's events ===
Event	Gold		Silver		Bronze	
1 m springboard	Tatiana Ortiz (MEX)	259.40	Alejandra Fuentes (VEN)	257.10	Paola Espinosa (MEX)	242.40
3 m springboard	Laura Sanchez (MEX)	310.00	Alejandra Fuentes (VEN)	291.60	Angelique Rodriguez (PUR)	284.10
10 m platform	Jashia Luna (MEX)	335.90	Paola Espinosa (MEX)	332.70	Sahilin Martinez (CUB)	304.10

== Medal table ==
* Host nation (Colombia)

Rank	Nation	Gold	Silver	Bronze	Total
1	Mexico	3	3	2	8
2	Cuba	3	0	1	4
3	Venezuela	0	2	1	3
4	Colombia*	0	1	1	2
5	Puerto Rico	0	0	1	1
Totals (5 entries)		6	6	6	18
