= Diving at the 2005 Summer Universiade =

The Diving competition in the 2005 Summer Universiade were held in İzmir, Turkey.

== Medal overview ==
=== Men's events ===
| Event | Gold | Silver | Bronze |
|---|---|---|---|
| 1 metre Springboard | Wang Feng (CHN) | Wang Kenan (CHN) | César Castro (BRA) |
| 3 metre Springboard | Wang Feng (CHN) | César Castro (BRA) | Peng Bo (CHN) |
| 10 metre Platform | Rommel Pacheco (MEX) | Feng Qi (CHN) | Aleksei Kravchenko (RUS) |
| Synchronized Springboard | Peng Bo & Wang Kenan (CHN) | Jorge Betancourt & Erick Fornaris (CUB) | César Castro & Cassius Duran (BRA) |
| Synchronized Platform | Aleksei Kravchenko & Anton Melnikov (RUS) | Feng Qi & Huang Jinghui (CHN) | Omar Ojeda & Rommel Pacheco (MEX) |
| Team Trophy | China (CHN) | Mexico (MEX) | Brazil (BRA) |

=== Women's events ===
| Event | Gold | Silver | Bronze |
|---|---|---|---|
| 1 metre Springboard | Wu Minxia (CHN) | Olena Fedorova (UKR) | Juliana Veloso (BRA) |
| 3 metre Springboard | Guo Jingjing (CHN) | Wu Minxia (CHN) | Paola Espinosa (MEX) |
| 10 metre Platform | Li Ting (CHN) | Cassandra Cardinell (USA) | Li Na (CHN) |
| Synchronized Springboard | Li Ting & Guo Jingjing (CHN) | Paola Espinosa & Jashia Luna (MEX) | Amey Moors-Chantry & Briony Cole (AUS) |
| Synchronized Platform | Mo Hanna & Li Ting (CHN) | Hong In-Sun & Choe Kum-Hui (PRK) | Paola Espinosa & Jashia Luna (MEX) |
| Team Trophy | China (CHN) | Mexico (MEX) | United States (USA) |

== Medal table ==
* Host nation (Turkey)

| Rank | Nation | Gold | Silver | Bronze | Total |
|---|---|---|---|---|---|
| 1 | China | 10 | 4 | 2 | 16 |
| 2 | Mexico | 1 | 3 | 3 | 7 |
| 3 | Russia | 1 | 0 | 1 | 2 |
| 4 | Brazil | 0 | 1 | 4 | 5 |
| 5 | United States | 0 | 1 | 1 | 2 |
| 6 | Cuba | 0 | 1 | 0 | 1 |
| 6 | North Korea | 0 | 1 | 0 | 1 |
| 6 | Ukraine | 0 | 1 | 0 | 1 |
| 9 | Australia | 0 | 0 | 1 | 1 |
| Totals (9 entries) | | 12 | 12 | 12 | 36 |
