= Jorge Betancourt =

Cuban diver (born 1982)

Personal information
- Full name: Jorge Betancourt García
- Born: February 13, 1982 (age 44)
Medal record
Men's diving
Representing Cuba
Universiade
| Silver medal – second place | 2005 Izmir | Synchronized springboard |
Pan American Games
| Silver medal – second place | 2003 Santo Domingo | 3 m synchro |
| Silver medal – second place | 2007 Rio de Janeiro | 3 m synchro |

Jorge Betancourt García (born February 13, 1982, in Matanzas) is a male diver from Cuba. He represented his native country at two consecutive Summer Olympics, starting in 2004 (Athens, Greece). Betancourt twice (2003 and 2007) won a silver medal at the Pan American Games alongside Erick Fornaris in the Men's 3m Springboard Synchro event.

== See also ==
- List of divers
