= Sergey Nazin =

Russian diver (born 1987)

Personal information
- Full name: Sergey Anatolyevich Nazin
- Nationality: Russian
- Born: 16 July 1987 (age 38) Busuluk, Russia
- Height: 1.67 m (5 ft 6 in)
- Weight: 67 kg (148 lb)

Sport
- Country: Russia
- Sport: Diving
- Club: CSKA Moscow
Medal record
World Championships
Silver medal – second place	2019 Gwangju	Mixed team
Summer Universiade
Silver medal – second place	2009 Belgrade	Team
Silver medal – second place	2009 Belgrade	Synchronised platform
Silver medal – second place	2013 Kazan	Team
Military World Games
Bronze medal – third place	2019 Wuhan	10 m synchro

Sergey Anatolyevich Nazin (Russian: Сергей Анатольевич Назин; born 16 July 1987) is a Russian diver.

He participated at the 2019 World Aquatics Championships, winning a medal.
