= Diving at the 2009 Summer Universiade =

The Diving competition in the 2009 Summer Universiade were held in Belgrade, Serbia.

== Medal overview ==
=== Men's events ===
Event	Gold	Silver	Bronze
1 metre Springboard	Evgeniy Novoselov (RUS)	Wu Minghong (CHN)	Yuriy Shlyakhov (UKR)
3 metre Springboard	Pan Zhaowei (CHN)	Yahel Castillo (MEX)	Illya Kvasha (UKR)
10 metre Platform	Kostyantyn Milyayev (UKR)	Rommel Pacheco (MEX)	Wang Zihao (CHN)
Synchronized 3 metre Springboard	Wu Minghong & Zhang Sen (CHN)	Oleksiy Prygorov & Illya Kvasha (UKR)	Daniel Mazzaferro & Kelly Marx (USA)
Synchronized 10 metre Platform	Wang Zihao & Li Mengqiang (CHN)	Anton Melnikov & Sergey Nazin (RUS)	Sean Moore & David Colturi (USA)
Team Trophy	China (CHN)	Russia (RUS)	United States (USA)

=== Women's events ===
Event	Gold	Silver	Bronze
1 metre Springboard	Dong Jun (CHN)	Yao Xinyi (CHN)	Ashley Karnes (USA)
3 metre Springboard	Dong Jun (CHN)	Laura Sánchez (MEX)	Paola Espinosa (MEX)
10 metre Platform	Paola Espinosa (MEX)	Chen Ni (CHN)	Yulia Prokopchuk (UKR)
Synchronized 3 metre Springboard	Paola Espinosa & Laura Sánchez (MEX)	Lao Lishi & Chen Ni (CHN)	Abigail Johnston & Brittney Feldman (USA)
Synchronized 10 metre Platform	Lao Lishi & Chen Ni (CHN)	Paola Espinosa & Laura Sánchez (MEX)	Choe Kum-Hui & Kim Un-Hyang (PRK)
Team Trophy	Mexico (MEX)	China (CHN)	United States (USA)

== Medal table ==
Rank	Nation	Gold	Silver	Bronze	Total
1	China (CHN)	7	5	1	13
2	Mexico (MEX)	3	4	1	8
3	Russia (RUS)	1	2	0	3
4	Ukraine (UKR)	1	1	3	5
5	United States (USA)	0	0	6	6
6	North Korea (PRK)	0	0	1	1
Totals (6 entries)		12	12	12	36
