= Verónica Ribot =

Argentine diver (born 1962)

Personal information
- Full name: Verónica G. Ribot-Canales
- Born: February 27, 1962 (age 64)
Medal record
Women's diving
Representing Argentina
Pan American Games
Silver medal – second place	1983 Caracas	10m platform
Bronze medal – third place	1987 Indianapolis	10m platform

Verónica G. Ribot-Canales' (born February 27, 1962) is a retired female diver from Argentina.

She was selected by her country as a team member for the 1980 Olympics in Moscow, but due to the Boycott of those Olympics by many countries including Argentina, was unable to take part. She competed in three consecutive Summer Olympics for her native country, starting in 1984.

Ribot claimed a silver and a bronze medal in the Women's 10m Platform at the Pan American Games. She was a South American Champion from 1980-1992. She was the only woman diver at the Barcelona Olympics to make the finals (top 12) in both Olympic events (3 meter springboard & 10 meter platform).

She competed at the NIKE World Masters Games in 1998 winning 3 individual events (1 & 3 meter springboard and platform) and came back to compete at the Masters level after a 26 year absence in 2023. She won 3 individual events at the U.S. Masters National Championships in 2023 & 2024, as well as the World Masters Championships in Fukuoka, Japan in 2023 in 1 & 3 meter springboard.

Ribot-Canales has two children, Lucas & Olympia. She took a position as Cornell University's Head Diving Coach in fall of 2007-2016. She has been coaching at State University of New York in Cortland since 2021 and was named 2-time SUNYAC Diving coach of the year.

== See also ==
- List of divers
