= Kyle Prandi =

American diver

Personal information
- Born: June 19, 1979 (age 47) Cleveland, Ohio
- Height: 5 ft 7 in (1.70 m)

Sport
- Country: United States
- Event(s): Diving: 10 m, 10 m synchro
Medal record
Men's diving
Representing the United States
Pan American Games
Bronze medal – third place	2003 S. Domingo	Platform Synchro

Kyle Prandi (born June 19, 1979 in Cleveland, Ohio) is an American diver and Olympian from Strongsville, Ohio. Kyle represented the United States in the 2004 Summer Olympics, earning 29th place in men's 10-meter diving platform with 346.53 points, and placing 8th in men's 10-meter synchronized platform with diving partner Mark Ruiz. Prandi holds the American record for the highest recorded score on a single dive (104.76 on a 207B at the 2002 World Cup Trials).

== Results ==
- 1998 Cinergy/PSI National Diving Championships – Gold Medal in Platform Synchro
- 2002 World Cup Trials – Gold Medal in 10 m Platform
- 2004 Speedo American Cup – Gold Medal in Platform Synchro

== See also ==
- United States at the 2004 Summer Olympics
