= Wang Feng (diver) =

Chinese diver (born 1979)

Personal information
- Full name: Wang Feng
- Born: April 17, 1979 (age 47) Xintai, Tai'an, Shandong
- Height: 170 cm (5 ft 7 in)

Sport
- Country: China
- Event(s): 1m, 3m, 3m synchro
- Partner: Qin Kai
- Coached by: Zhong Shaozhen
Medal record
Representing China
Men's Diving
Olympic Games
Gold medal – first place	2008 Beijing	3m Springboard Synchro
World Championships
Gold medal – first place	2001 Fukuoka	1m Springboard
Gold medal – first place	2005 Montreal	3m Springboard Synchro
Gold medal – first place	2007 Melbourne	3m Springboard Synchro
Gold medal – first place	2009 Rome	3 m Springboard Synchro
Silver medal – second place	2003 Barcelona	3m Springboard Synchro
Bronze medal – third place	2005 Montreal	1m Springboard
Asian Games
Gold medal – first place	2006 Doha	3m Springboard Synchro
Silver medal – second place	2002 Busan	3m Springboard
Summer Universiade
Gold medal – first place	1999 Palma de Mallorca	1 m springboard
Gold medal – first place	2003 Daegu	Team
Gold medal – first place	2003 Daegu	1 m springboard
Gold medal – first place	2005 Izmir	Team
Gold medal – first place	2005 Izmir	1 m springboard
Gold medal – first place	2005 Izmir	3 m springboard
Gold medal – first place	2001 Beijing	Team
Silver medal – second place	2001 Beijing	1 m springboard

Wang Feng (Chinese: 王峰; pinyin: Wáng Fēng; born April 17, 1979, in Xintai, Tai'an, Shandong) is a Chinese athlete who competes in diving. He competed for Team China at the 2008 Summer Olympics in Beijing.

He claimed the gold medal at the 2008 World Cup - 3m springboard synchro event. He and Qin Kai are the 2008 Olympic Champions in 3m synchro.
