= Justin Dumais =

American diver

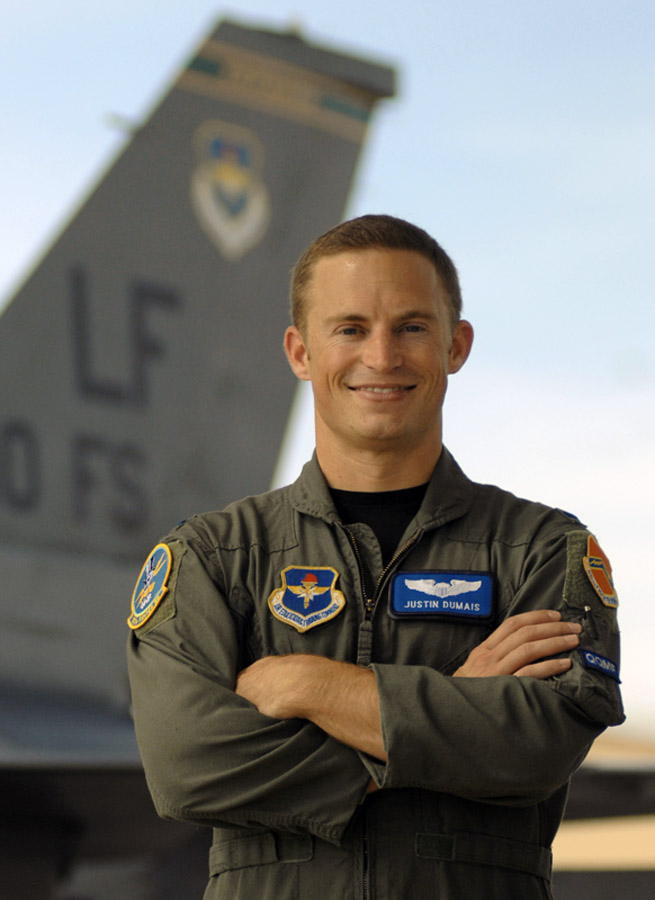
- Dumais in August 2008

Personal information
- Born: August 13, 1978 (age 47) Oxnard, California, U.S.
Medal record
Men's diving
Representing the United States
World Championships
Bronze medal – third place	2005 Montreal	Springsynchro
Pan American Games
Bronze medal – third place	2003 Santo Domingo	3 m synchro

Justin Dumais (born August 13, 1978, in Oxnard, California) is a former Olympic diver and current commercial airline pilot. He represented the United States in the 2004 Summer Olympics and placed 6th in the 3-meter synchronized spring board with his brother Troy Dumais.

Dumais was raised in a family of divers and swimmers, and in 1994 was named Southern Pacific Association Diver of the Year in his class, as were all his siblings.

He retired from diving after the 2004 Olympics and joined the US Air Force. Dumais became a fighter pilot, flying F-16 aircraft in the Air National Guard, and is now a first officer at American Airlines.

In the 2011 US National Championships, he and his younger brother Dwight Dumais participated in the men's 3-meter synchronized diving event. They finished third with 378.63 points, behind top finishers brother Troy Dumais and Kristian Ipsen.

== See also ==
- List of divers
- List of people from California
