= María José Alcalá =

Mexican diver

Personal information
- Born: 24 December 1971 (age 54) Mexico City, Mexico

Sport
- Sport: Diving
Medal record
Women's diving
Representing Mexico
Summer Universiade
Silver medal – second place	1995 Fukuoka	3 m springboard
Bronze medal – third place	1997 Sicily	3 m springboard
Pan American Games
Bronze medal – third place	1999 Winnipeg	10 m platform

María José Alcalá Izguerra (born 24 December 1971) is a Mexican former diver. She competed at the 1988, 1992, 1996 and the 2000 Summer Olympics. In 2021, she became the first female President of the Mexican Olympic Committee.

In March 2023, she officially announced Mexico's interest in organizing the 2036 Summer Olympics.
