= Wang Kenan =

Chinese diver

Personal information
- Native name: 王克楠
- Nationality: China
- Born: 3 August 1980 Baoding, Hebei, China
- Died: 5 October 2013 (aged 33) Tianjin, China

Sport
- Country: China
- Sport: Diving
Medal record
Men's diving
Representing China
World Championships
Gold medal – first place	2001 Fukuoka	3 m springboard synchro
Silver medal – second place	2003 Barcelona	1 m springboard
Asian Games
Gold medal – first place	2002 Busan	3 m springboard synchro
Universiade
Gold medal – first place	2003 Daegu	Team
Gold medal – first place	2001 Beijing	Team
Gold medal – first place	2005 İzmir	Team
Gold medal – first place	2007 Bangkok	Team
Gold medal – first place	2001 Beijing	3 m springboard synchro
Gold medal – first place	2005 İzmir	3 m springboard synchro
Gold medal – first place	2007 Bangkok	3 m springboard synchro
Gold medal – first place	1999 Palma de Mallorca	3 m springboard
Gold medal – first place	2003 Daegu	3 m springboard synchro
Silver medal – second place	2003 Daegu	3 m springboard
Silver medal – second place	2005 İzmir	1 m springboard

Wang Kenan (Chinese: 王克楠; 3 August 1980 – 5 October 2013) was a Chinese diver who competed in the 2004 Summer Olympics. In early October 2013 he was in Tianjin to serve as a judge for the 2013 East Asian Games, but died in a car accident.
