= Diving at the 1999 Pan American Games =

Diving Competition at the 1999 Pan American Games was held from March 11 to March 26, 1999, in Winnipeg, Manitoba, Canada. There were a total number of two events, for both men and women, after the 1m Springboard event was skipped from the Pan American Games.

== Medal table ==
* Host nation (Canada)

Rank	Nation	Gold	Silver	Bronze	Total
1	Canada*	2	1	1	4
2	Mexico	1	1	2	4
3	United States	1	1	1	3
4	Cuba	0	1	0	1
Totals (4 entries)		4	4	4	12

== Medalists ==
=== Men ===
Event	Gold	Silver	Bronze
3m springboard	Mark Ruiz; United States	Fernando Platas; Mexico	Troy Dumais; United States
10m platform	Fernando Platas; Mexico	José Guerra; Cuba	Eduardo Rueda; Mexico

=== Women ===
Event	Gold	Silver	Bronze
3m springboard	Eryn Bulmer; Canada	Jenny Lingamfelter; United States	Blythe Hartley; Canada
10m platform	Émilie Heymans; Canada	Blythe Hartley; Canada	María José Alcalá; Mexico

== See also ==
- Diving at the 2000 Summer Olympics
