= Conny Schmalfuss =

German diver

Personal information
- Born: 29 October 1975 (age 50)
Medal record
Women's diving
Representing Germany
World Championships
Silver medal – second place	2003 Barcelona	1 m springboard
Silver medal – second place	2005 Montréal	3 m synchro
Bronze medal – third place	2001 Fukuoka	3 m synchro
European Championships
Gold medal – first place	1997 Seville	3 m synchro
Gold medal – first place	2002 Berlin	3 m synchro
Silver medal – second place	1995 Vienna	10 m platform
Silver medal – second place	1999 Istanbul	3 m synchro
Silver medal – second place	2000 Helsinki	3 m synchro
Silver medal – second place	2004 Madrid	3 m synchro
Bronze medal – third place	1991 Athens	1 m springboard
Bronze medal – third place	1999 Istanbul	1 m springboard
Bronze medal – third place	1999 Istanbul	3 m springboard
Bronze medal – third place	2002 Berlin	3 m springboard
Summer Universiade
Silver medal – second place	2001 Beijing	Women's synchro springboard
Silver medal – second place	2003 Daegu	Women's synchro springboard

Conny Schmalfuss (born 29 October 1975 in Schwedt, Brandenburg) is a female diver from Germany, who won her first international medal (a bronze) at the 1991 European Championships in Athens, Greece in the women's 1 m springboard.

Schmalfuss competed for Germany in two consecutive Summer Olympics, starting in 2000. She was affiliated with the Berliner Turn- und Sportclub in Berlin, and formed a pair in the synchro event with Ditte Kotzian.
