= Cassandra Cardinell =

American diver

Personal information
- Born: April 12, 1982 (age 44) Loudonville, New York, U.S.

Sport
- Country: United States
- Sport: Diving
- Partner: Sara Hildebrand
Medal record
Women's diving
Representing the United States
Pan American Games
Bronze medal – third place	2003 Santo Domingo	3 m synchro
Universiade
Silver medal – second place	2005 İzmir	10 m platform
Silver medal – second place	2003 Daegu	Team
Bronze medal – third place	2007 Bangkok	Team
Bronze medal – third place	2005 İzmir	Team
Bronze medal – third place	2003 Daegu	Synchronised springboard
Bronze medal – third place	2003 Daegu	Synchronised platform

Cassandra Cardinell (born April 12, 1982) is an American diver. She competed at the 2004 Summer Olympics in Athens, in the women's synchronized 10 metre platform. Cardinell was born in Loudonville, New York.
