= Reuben Ross =

Canadian diver

Personal information
- Full name: Reuben Daniel Ross
- Born: December 5, 1985 (age 40) Regina, Saskatchewan, Canada
- Height: 175 cm (5 ft 9 in)

Sport
- Country: Canada
- Event(s): 3m springboard, 3m synchro
- Club: Club Aquatique de Montreal
- Partner: Alexandre Despatie
- Coached by: Arturo Miranda
Medal record
Men's Diving
World Championships
Bronze medal – third place	2009 Rome	Springboard Synchro
Commonwealth Games
Gold medal – first place	2010 Delhi	Springboard synchro
Silver medal – second place	2010 Delhi	3 m springboard

Reuben Ross (born December 5, 1985) is a Canadian diver. He won a gold medal in the men's 3m or 3m synchronized events at the Canadian Nationals from 2008 to 2011 . Ross competed in the individual 3m springboard and 10m platform events at the 2008 Summer Olympics in Beijing. At the 2012 Summer Olympics, he competed in the 3m springboard synchronized event with Alexandre Despatie.

In 2011, Ross earned sixth place in the 3m event at the FINA World Championships. He won gold at the 2010 Commonwealth Games with Despatie in the 3m synchro adding to his individual silver in the 3m.

In 2012, he finished 10th in the 3m springboard event at the FINA World Cup and finished fifth in the 3m synchro event with partner Alexandre Despatie.

Ross grew up in Pilot Butte, Saskatchewan, and currently lives in Edmonton, Alberta with his wife and three children.

== Accomplishments ==
- 2011: Gold medal on 3m at the Summer Senior National Championships in Edmonton
- 2011: Gold medal on 3m synchro at the Winter Senior National Championships (with Alexandre Despatie)
- 2010: Gold medal on 3m synchro springboard at the Commonwealth Games (with Alexandre Despatie)
- 2009: Bronze medal on 3m synchro springboard at the World Aquatics Championships (with Alexandre Despatie)
- 2009: Gold medal on 3m at ACC Conference championships
- 2009: Gold medal on 1m and 3m at Winter Senior National Championships in Calgary
- 2008: Gold medal on 3m at the NCAA Men's Div I Diving Championships
- 2008: Gold medal on 3m, 10m and 10m synchro with Riley McCormick at the Winter Senior National Championships
- 2006: Silver medal on 3m synchro and 4th place on 3m at the Summer Senior National Championships

Civil Engineering degree from the University of Miami.
