= Arturo Miranda =

Canadian diver and coach (born 1971)

Personal information
- Full name: Arturo Lazaro Miranda
- Born: January 19, 1971 (age 55) Havana, Cuba
- Home town: Montreal, Quebec, Canada

Sport
- Country: Canada
- Event(s): 3m springboard, 3m synchro
- Club: Pointe-Claire Diving Club
- Former partner(s): Alexandre Despatie, Reuben Ross, Philippe Comtois
- Coached by: Yihua Li
- Retired: Retired
Medal record
FINA World Aquatics Championships
Silver medal – second place	2007 Melbourne	Synchronized Springboard
Pan American Games
Bronze medal – third place	2007 Rio	Synchronized Springboard

Arturo Lazaro Miranda (born January 19, 1971) is a Canadian national team diving coach and former diver. Miranda coaches Olympians Meaghan Benfeito, Roseline Filion, and Jennifer Abel at the Pointe-Claire Diving Club with Li Yihua.

Miranda finished in fifth in the synchronized 3m springboard event at the 2008 Summer Olympics in Beijing with former world champion Alexandre Despatie. He was born in Havana, Cuba.
