= Jocelyn Castillo =

Venezuelan diver (born 1991)

Personal information
- Born: 20 May 1991 (age 34) Barquisimeto, Venezuela

Sport
- Sport: Diving

Jocelyn Castillo Suárez (born 20 May 1991) is a Venezuelan diver. She competed in the 3 m springboard at the 2012 Summer Olympics.
