= Ariel Rittenhouse =

American diver

Personal information
- Born: December 9, 1990 (age 35) Menlo Park, California, U.S.
- Height: 5 ft 3 in (1.60 m)
Medal record
Women's diving
Representing the United States
Pan American Games
Silver medal – second place	2007 Rio	Springboard synchro

Ariel Rittenhouse (born December 9, 1990) is an American diving athlete. Rittenhouse won a silver medal at the 2007 Pan American Games in Rio de Janeiro. At the 2008 Summer Olympics, Rittenhouse placed 4th in the synchronized springboard. Her mother, Sharon Finneran, was an Olympic swimmer who won a silver medal at the 1964 Summer Olympics.

Ariel was a diver at Florida State University.
