= Jashia Luna =

Mexican diver

Personal information
- Full name: Jashia Judith Luña Alfaro
- Born: December 28, 1978 (age 47) Guadalajara, Jalisco, Mexico
Medal record
Women's diving
Representing Mexico
Summer Universiade
Silver medal – second place	2005 İzmir	Team
Silver medal – second place	2005 İzmir	3 m synchro
Bronze medal – third place	2005 İzmir	10 m synchro
Central American and Caribbean Games
Gold medal – first place	2006 Cartagena	10 m platform

Jashia Judith Luña Alfaro (born December 28, 1978, in Guadalajara, Jalisco) is a diver from Mexico. She represented her native country at three consecutive Summer Olympics starting in 2000.
