= Sara Reiling-Hildebrand =

American diver

Sara Hildebrand
Personal information
- Full name: Sara Reiling-Hildebrand
- Born: September 18, 1979 (age 46) Saint Paul, Minnesota, U.S.

Sport
- Country: United States
- Sport: Diving
- Partner: Cassandra Cardinell
Medal record
Women's diving
Representing the United States
Pan American Games
Bronze medal – third place	2003 Santo Domingo	3 m synchro
Universiade
Silver medal – second place	2003 Daegu	Team
Bronze medal – third place	2003 Daegu	10 m platform
Bronze medal – third place	2003 Daegu	Synchronized Springboard
Bronze medal – third place	2003 Daegu	Synchronized Platform

Sara Reiling-Hildebrand (born September 18, 1979) is an American diver. She competed at the 2000 Summer Olympics in Sydney, in the women's 10 metre platform. She competed at the 2004 Summer Olympics in Athens, in the women's 10 metre platform and the women's synchronized 10 metre platform.

In 2006, Hildebrand was hired as the first diving coach at Florida Gulf Coast University.
