= Cassidy Krug =

American diver

Personal information
- Born: July 12, 1985 (age 40) Pittsburgh, Pennsylvania, U.S.
- Height: 163 cm (5 ft 4 in)
- Weight: 61 kg (134 lb)

Sport
- Country: United States
- Sport: Diving
- Event(s): 3 m, 3 m synchro
- Club: Stanford Diving
- Coached by: Rick Schavone
Medal record
Women's Diving
Representing United States
Pan American Games
Silver medal – second place	2011 Guadalajara	3m Springboard
Bronze medal – third place	2011 Guadalajara	Synchronized 3m springboard

Cassidy Krug (born July 12, 1985) is an American diver from Pittsburgh, Pennsylvania.

Krug competed in the 2012 Summer Olympics classifying 7th in the women's 3 m springboard after ranking 5th in the semifinals. During the 2011 Pan American Games she has won a silver medal in the 3 m individual competition and a bronze in the synchronized event from the same height alongside her partner Kassidy Cook.

Her life partner is researcher Nicholas Tatonetti.
