= Kelly MacDonald (diver) =

Canadian diver (born 1988)

Personal information
- Born: May 26, 1988 (age 38) Edmonton, Alberta, Canada
Medal record
Women's diving
Representing Canada
Pan American Games
Bronze medal – third place	2007 Rio de Janeiro	3m Synchro

Kelly MacDonald (born May 26, 1988 in Edmonton, Alberta) is a diver from Canada. She won a bronze medal at the 2007 Pan American Games in the 3m Synchronized event alongside Meaghan Benfeito.
