= Rommel Pacheco =

Mexican politician and former diver (born 1986)

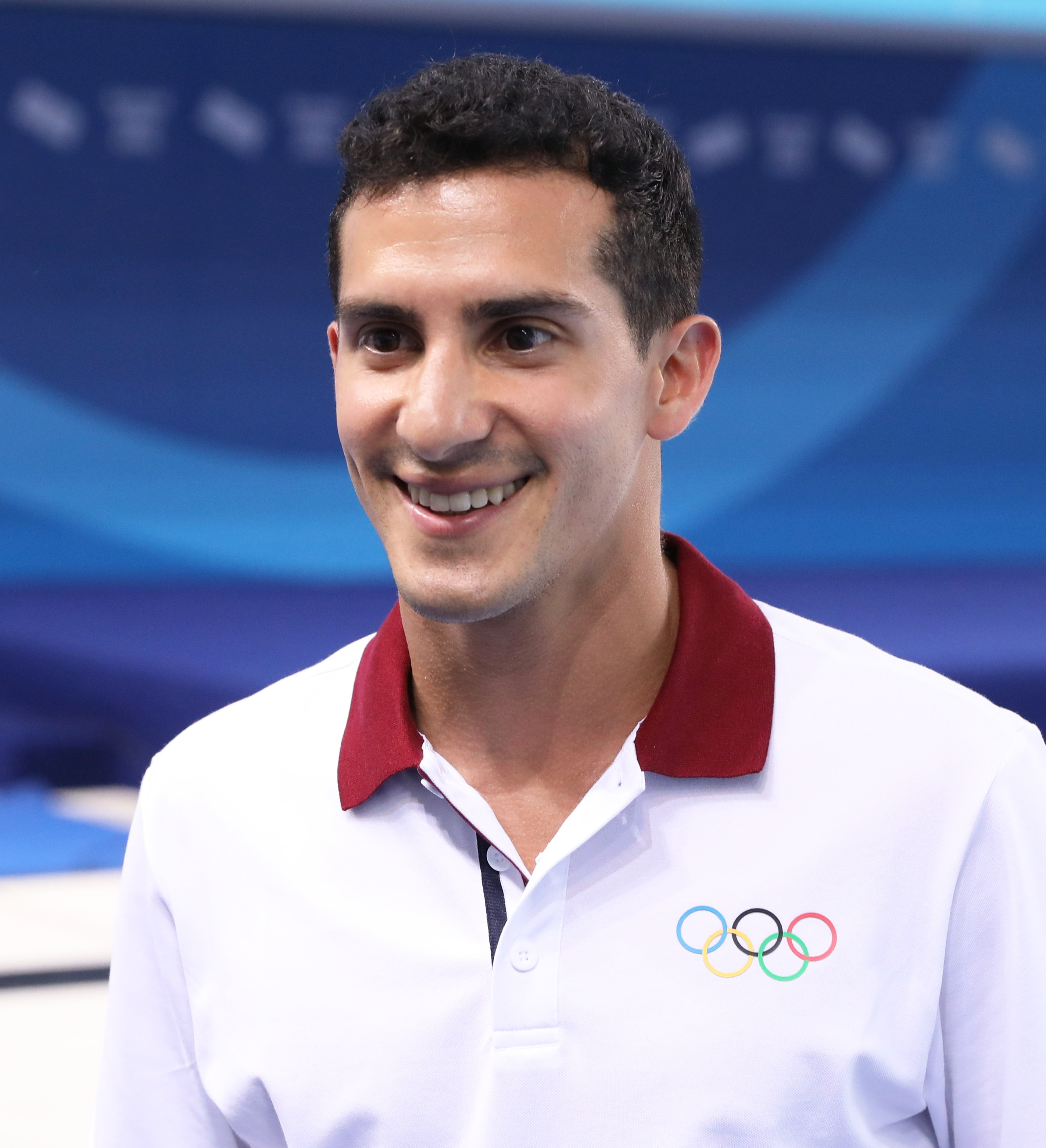
- Rommel Pacheco at the 2018 Summer Youth Olympics

Personal information
- Full name: Rommel Agmed Pacheco Marrufo
- Nationality: Mexican
- Born: 12 July 1986 (age 40) Mérida, Yucatán
- Height: 1.67 m (5 ft 6 in)
- Weight: 65 kg (143 lb)

President of CONADE
- Incumbent
- Assumed office 1 October 2024
- Preceded by: Ana Guevara

Personal details
- Party: Morena (2023–present)
- Other political affiliations: National Action Party (2021–2023)

Sport
- Country: Mexico
- Sport: Diving
- Event: 5 km
- Club: 3 m, 3 m synchro, 10 m, 10 m synchro
Medal record
World Swimming Championships
Silver medal – second place	2017 Budapest	Team event
Silver medal – second place	2019 Gwangju	1 m springboard
Bronze medal – third place	2013 Barcelona	3 m synchro
Diving World Cup
Gold medal – first place	2016 Rio de Janeiro	3 m springboard
Bronze medal – third place	2016 Rio de Janeiro	3 m synchro
Bronze medal – third place	2018 Wuhan	3 m synchro
Pan American Games
Gold medal – first place	2003 St. Domingo	10 m platform
Gold medal – first place	2015 Toronto	3 m springboard
Gold medal – first place	2015 Toronto	3 m synchro
Silver medal – second place	2003 St. Domingo	10 m synchro
Silver medal – second place	2007 Rio	10 m platform
Silver medal – second place	2011 Guadalajara	10 m platform
Universiade
Gold medal – first place	2005 İzmir	10 m platform
Silver medal – second place	2005 İzmir	Team
Silver medal – second place	2009 Belgrade	10 m platform
Silver medal – second place	2011 Shenzhen	3 m synchro
Bronze medal – third place	2005 İzmir	10 m synchro
Bronze medal – third place	2007 Bangkok	3 m springboard
Bronze medal – third place	2011 Shenzhen	10 m platform
Bronze medal – third place	2011 Shenzhen	10 m synchro
Central American and Caribbean Games
Silver medal – second place	2006 Cartagena	1 m springboard
Silver medal – second place	2006 Cartagena	3 m springboard
Silver medal – second place	2010 Mayagüez	10 m platform
Bronze medal – third place	2006 Cartagena	10 m platform

Rommel Agmed Pacheco Marrufo (born 12 July 1986) is a Mexican politician and retired diver. He was a six-time Pan American Games medalist (three gold, three silver). In the 2004 Summer Olympics he finished in 10th place in the 10-meter platform and 3-meter springboard. In the 2008 Summer Olympics he finished in 8th place in the 10-meter platform.

In the 2021 mid-terms Pacheco was elected to the Chamber of Deputies to represent the third district of Yucatán for the National Action Party (PAN). In October 2024, he was appointed by President Claudia Sheinbaum as the new head of the National Commission for Physical Culture and Sport (CONADE), replacing Ana Gabriela Guevara.

Olympic Games
Preceded by Germán Madrazo	Flagbearer for Mexico (with Gaby López); Tokyo 2020	Succeeded by Donovan Carrillo and Sarah Schleper
