= Annie Pelletier =

Canadian diver (born 1973)

Personal information
- Born: December 22, 1973 (age 52) Montreal, Quebec, Canada
Medal record
Women's diving
Representing Canada
Olympic Games
| Bronze medal – third place | 1996 Atlanta | 3m Springboard |
World Championships
| Bronze medal – third place | 1994 Rome | 1m Springboard |
Universiade
| Silver medal – second place | 1993 Buffalo | 1 m springboard |
Pan American Games
| Gold medal – first place | 1995 Mar del Plata | 3m Springboard |
| Silver medal – second place | 1995 Mar del Plata | 1m Springboard |
Commonwealth Games
| Gold medal – first place | 1994 Victoria | 1m Springboard |
| Gold medal – first place | 1994 Victoria | 3m Springboard |

Annie Pelletier (born December 22, 1973) is a retired female diver from Canada who won the bronze medal in the women's 3 metres springboard event at the 1996 Summer Olympics in Atlanta, Georgia. She was affiliated with the Club Aquatique Montréal Olympique during her career.

For August 2008, she was a diving commentator for Télévision de Radio-Canada at the 2008 Beijing Olympics.

== See also ==
- Anne Montminy, fellow diver, 2008 Olympics diving commentator for CBC Television
