= Iohana Cruz =

Cuban diver (born 1980)

Personal information
- Full name: Iohana Cruz Talabera
- Born: January 9, 1980 (age 46)
Medal record
Women's diving
Representing Cuba
Pan American Games
Bronze medal – third place	2003 Santo Domingo	10m synchro

Iohana Cruz Talabera (born January 9, 1980) is a female diver from Cuba. She represented her native country at two consecutive Summer Olympics, starting in 2000 (Sydney, Australia). Cruz won a bronze medal at the 2003 Pan American Games alongside Yolanda Ortiz in the Women's 10m Platform Synchro event.
