= Alejandra Fuentes =

Venezuelan diver (born 1983)

Personal information
- Born: December 31, 1983 (age 42)
Medal record
Women's diving
Representing Venezuela
Central American and Caribbean Games
Silver medal – second place	2006 Cartagena	1 m springboard
Silver medal – second place	2006 Cartagena	3 m springboard
South American Championships
Gold medal – first place	2008 São Paulo	1m Springboard
Gold medal – first place	2008 São Paulo	3m Springboard

Alejandra Fuentes Persson (born December 31, 1983) is a diver from Venezuela, who competed at the 2000 Summer Olympics for her native country. She claimed two gold medals at the 2008 South American Swimming Championships in São Paulo.
