= Peng Bo =

Chinese diver

Personal information
- Nationality: China
- Born: 18 February 1981 (age 45) Nanchang, Jiangxi, China

Sport
- Country: China
- Sport: Diving
Medal record
Men's diving
Representing China
Olympic Games
Gold medal – first place	2004 Athens	3m Springboard
Asian Games
Gold medal – first place	2002 Busan	Springboard Synchro
Summer Universiade
Gold medal – first place	2001 Beijing	Springboard Synchro
Gold medal – first place	2001 Beijing	Team
Gold medal – first place	2003 Daegu	Team
Gold medal – first place	2003 Daegu	Springboard Synchro
Gold medal – first place	2005 Izmir	Team
Gold medal – first place	2005 Izmir	Springboard Synchro
Gold medal – first place	2007 Bangkok	Team
Gold medal – first place	2007 Bangkok	3m Springboard
Gold medal – first place	2007 Bangkok	Springboard Synchro
Bronze medal – third place	2005 Izmir	3m Springboard

Peng Bo (Chinese: 彭勃; pinyin: Péng Bó; born 18 February 1981 in Nanchang, Jiangxi) is a Chinese diver who competed at the 2004 Summer Olympics and won the men's 3m springboard diving event with a score of 787.38.

He also competed in the men's synchronised 3m springboard diving event along with his partner Wang Kenan and was placed 8th with a score of 283.89. He and Wang have both won several medals in diving events.
