= Alexandre Despatie =

Canadian diver and broadcaster (born 1985)

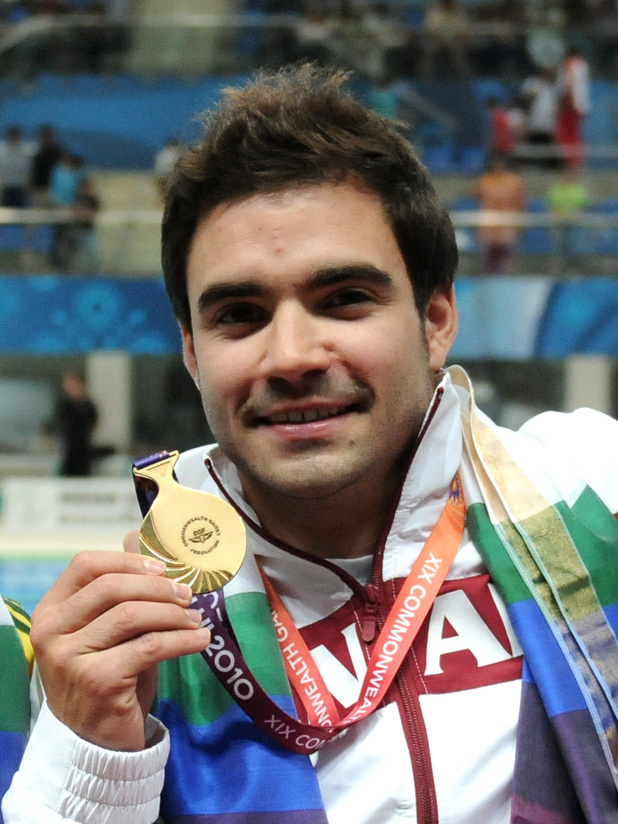

Personal information
- Born: June 8, 1985 (age 41) Montreal, Quebec, Canada
- Home town: Laval, Quebec, Canada
- Height: 173 cm (5 ft 8 in)

Sport
- Country: Canada
- Event(s): 3 m springboard, 3 m synchro
- Partner: Reuben Ross
- Former partner(s): Arturo Miranda, Philippe Comtois
Medal record
Men's diving
Olympic Games
Silver medal – second place	2004 Athens	3 m springboard
Silver medal – second place	2008 Beijing	3 m springboard
World Championships
Gold medal – first place	2003 Barcelona	10 m platform
Gold medal – first place	2005 Montreal	3 m springboard
Gold medal – first place	2005 Montreal	1 m springboard
Silver medal – second place	2001 Fukuoka	10 m platform
Silver medal – second place	2007 Melbourne	3 m springboard
Silver medal – second place	2007 Melbourne	Springboard synchro
Bronze medal – third place	2009 Rome	Springboard synchro
Bronze medal – third place	2009 Rome	3 m springboard
Commonwealth Games
Gold medal – first place	1998 Kuala Lumpur	10 m platform
Gold medal – first place	2002 Manchester	3 m springboard
Gold medal – first place	2002 Manchester	1 m springboard
Gold medal – first place	2006 Melbourne	Springboard synchro
Gold medal – first place	2006 Melbourne	3 m springboard
Gold medal – first place	2006 Melbourne	1 m springboard
Gold medal – first place	2010 Delhi	1 m springboard
Gold medal – first place	2010 Delhi	3 m springboard
Gold medal – first place	2010 Delhi	Springboard synchro
Bronze medal – third place	2002 Manchester	10 m platform
Bronze medal – third place	2006 Melbourne	10 m platform
Pan American Games
Gold medal – first place	2003 S. Domingo	3 m springboard
Gold medal – first place	2003 S. Domingo	Springboard synchro
Gold medal – first place	2003 S. Domingo	Platform synchro
Gold medal – first place	2007 Rio de Janeiro	3 m springboard
Bronze medal – third place	2003 S. Domingo	10 m platform
Bronze medal – third place	2007 Rio de Janeiro	10 m platform
Bronze medal – third place	2007 Rio de Janeiro	Springboard synchro

Alexandre Despatie (French: [alɛksɑ̃dʁ depati]; born June 8, 1985) is a Canadian diver and broadcaster from Laval, Quebec. He was the world champion at the 1 and 3 m springboards from 2005 to 2007 and is the first, and so far only, diver to have been world champion in all three individual categories (1, 3 and 10 m platform). He is also a 37-time Canadian senior diving champion and nine-time junior champion, and the most decorated male diver in Canadian history, winning two Olympic silver medals and reaching eight podiums at the world championships, including three gold medals. He was born in Montreal, Quebec, Canada.

== Diving career ==
Despatie began diving at the age of 5 in his own backyard pool.

He first came to public attention at the 1998 Commonwealth Games with an extremely impressive gold medal on the 10 metre platform (which included an unprecedented score of perfect 10s). He was only 13 years old at the time, and the achievement was recorded in the Guinness Book Of World Records 2000.

At the Olympic games in Sydney in 2000, with a 4th-place finish at the 10-metre platform, he was offered the chance to compete in the springboard event in those Games as well, when one of the Canadian divers had to withdraw from the meet due to complications with his citizenship, but declined because he had not been training for that event.

He won the silver medal at the world championships in 2001 in Fukuoka, Japan in the same event, and in 2003 won a gold medal at the World Diving Championships in Barcelona, Spain in the 10 metre platform. He recorded 107.1 for his last dive, which set a new record.

At the 2002 Commonwealth Games in Manchester, Despatie won the gold medal in the three-metre springboard event, followed by three gold medals at the 2003 Pan American Games in Santo Domingo, Dominican Republic.

At the 2004 Summer Olympics in Athens, Greece, he won the silver medal in the men's 3 metre springboard competition, but finished out of the medal standings in fourth place in the 10 metre platform. This result was contrary to expectations going into the games, where he was expected to win silver or gold in the 10 metre platform event and not place in the 3 metre springboard.

In front of his home crowd at the 2005 World Aquatic Championships in Montreal, he became World Champion on the 3 metre springboard. He won with a world record score of 813.60 points, his "worst" dive being rated an average 8.5. Despatie followed up on that performance by winning the 1 m springboard, with a world record score of 489.69. His victory meant that he had won FINA World Titles on both springboard and platform.

Despatie successfully defended his three-meter springboard title at the 2006 Commonwealth Games in Melbourne, and also won gold medals on 1 m springboard and 3 m synchronized with Arturo Miranda. He finished 3rd in the 10m platform.

Returning to Melbourne, this time for the 2007 World Aquatics Championships, Despatie went head to head with the best divers in the world, including the top-ranked Chinese diving team. Finishing 8th in the 10 m tower event and winning silver medals in the 3 m event and the 3 m synchro with partner Arturo Miranda, Despatie proved that he was one of the world's best divers.

At the Beijing Olympics in 2008, he claimed a silver medal in the 3m springboard event and finished in 5th place in the 3m synchro event.

At the 2010 Commonwealth Games. Alexandre got 3 gold medals for Canada, in the 1 metre and 3 metre springboard, and 3 metre synchronized springboard dive.

== Television career ==
Despatie announced his retirement during a news conference in Montreal on June 4, 2013. On June 6, he was announced as the cohost of Breakfast Television's Montreal edition, set to premiere on City Montreal on August 26, 2013.

In 2015, Despatie left the show, and was replaced by Derek Fage.

In 2021, Despatie appeared on Chanteurs masqués, a Quebecois version of the popular TV show The Masked Singer. He appeared as "Gâteau" (Cake) and placed 8th overall.

In 2023, Despatie competed on Big Brother Célébrités. He was the 4th person evicted and lasted 29 days.

== Honors ==
In 2018, Despatie was awarded the Order of Sport, marking his induction into Canada's Sports Hall of Fame.

== Personal life ==
Despatie attended Collège André-Grasset. In an interview with the CBC in the lead-up to the 2004 Olympics, he said he was interested in acting and television/movie production, and may pursue that as a career once he is no longer diving, although he is also known to support groups and aspiring divers and to help them fulfill their dreams through private contributions to youth diving leagues. He has held diving clinics which aim to give young divers lessons and valuable experience.

In August 2006, Despatie started shooting his first feature film in Montreal. The movie, a teenage romantic comedy called Taking the Plunge (À vos marques... party!) was released in Quebec in March 2007. Despatie played a small but important part of a diver who is the friend and confidant of a young female swimmer. Quebec actress Louise Laparé coached Despatie for his role and told a Montreal newspaper that the popular athlete was a "born actor".

He has since moved towards a career in broadcasting, joining the broadcast team for Canada's French-language television coverage of the 2010 Olympic Winter Games in Vancouver during a brief break from training for the 2012 Games. He co-anchored the coverage of the opening and closing ceremonies alongside legendary Quebec hockey commentators Richard Garneau and Pierre Houde, narrated numerous athlete profiles, and took viewers on a tour of Granville Island, where many francophone musicians performed during the Olympics.

== See also ==
- CAMO Canadian National Training Centre
- Diving
- Philippe Comtois
