= Luis Villarroel =

Venezuelan diver (born 1981)

Personal information
- Born: July 2, 1981 (age 44)
Medal record
Men's diving
Representing Venezuela
Central American and Caribbean Games
Bronze medal – third place	2006 Cartagena	1 m springboard
South American Championships
Gold medal – first place	2008 São Paulo	Springboard Synchro
Silver medal – second place	2008 São Paulo	3m Springboard
Bronze medal – third place	2008 São Paulo	1m Springboard

Luis Alberto Villarroel Vera (born July 2, 1981, in Caracas, Distrito Capital) is a male diver from Venezuela, who competed at the 2000 Summer Olympics for his native country. He claimed three medals at the 2008 South American Swimming Championships in São Paulo.
