= Mark Ruiz =

Puerto Rican diver

Personal information
- Born: April 9, 1979 (age 47) Río Piedras, Puerto Rico
Medal record
Men's diving
Pan American Games
Representing Puerto Rico
Gold medal – first place	1999 Winnipeg	3m Springboard
Representing the United States
Bronze medal – third place	2003 S. Domingo	Platform Synchro

Mark Ruiz (born April 9, 1979 in Río Piedras, Puerto Rico), is an Olympic diver from Puerto Rico. Ruiz represented the United States in the 2000 Olympic Games and the 2004 Olympic Games.

== Childhood ==
Ruiz took up diving at the age of 9. Upon a coach's suggestion, he moved to the U.S. at 12 to take advantage of the better training system. During the spring nationals in 1999, he swept all three events (10-meter platform, 3-meter springboard and the non-Olympic event of 1-meter springboard), becoming the first diver since Greg Louganis in 1988 to accomplish this feat. Ruiz is a graduate of Dr. Phillips High School in Orlando, Florida. He was a member of the swimming and diving team and was the individual state champion for diving all four years he competed.

== Competition ==
Mark's first attempt at the Olympics happened at the 1996 Trials. Ruiz also competes in synchronized diving (springboard and platform), which will have medal events for the first time in Sydney. Ruiz, a four-time national champion in the platform, has already qualified in the platform and 3-meter springboard. He and partner Rio Ramirez finished fourth in the 3-meter springboard at the 2000 World Cup. Mark retired (temporarily) after the 2004 Olympics in Greece.

== Career ==
After his temporary retirement from competition, Ruiz taught diving clinics at the YMCA Aquatic Center. In 2010 Mark's former team, Team Orlando Diving (TOD) affiliated with the YMCA of Central Florida and became YCF Diving. Mark Ruiz was named head coach and continues in this position today.

== Achievements ==
- 1997 World Cup, platform, 5th
- 1998 Goodwill Games, 3-meter springboard, 10th; platform, 6th
- 1998 Summer National Championships, platform, 1-meter springboard, 1st; 3-meter springboard, 2nd
- 1998 Summer National Championships, synchronized, platform, 1st
- 1999 Spring National Championships, platform, 3- and 1-meter springboard, 1st
- 1999 Spring National Championships, synchronized, platform, 1st; 3-meter springboard, 3rd
- 1999 World Cup, platform, 3rd
- 1999 Pan American Games, 3-meter springboard, 1st, platform, 5th
- 1999 Summer National Championships, platform, 3- and 1-meter springboard, 1st
- 1999 Summer National Championships, synchronized, 3-meter springboard, 1st, platform, 2nd
- 2000 World Cup, platform, 5th; 3-meter springboard, 7th
- 2000 National Indoor Championships, synchronized, platform, 1st
- 2000 National Indoor Championships, platform, 3-meter springboard, 1st
- 2000 Olympic Team Trials, platform, 3-meter springboard, 1st
- 2000 Olympic Team
- 2004 Olympic Team
