= Fernando Platas =

Mexican diver

Personal information
- Full name: Fernando Fabricio Platas Álvarez
- Nationality: Mexico
- Born: March 16, 1973 (age 53) Mexico City, Mexico
- Height: 5 ft 5 in (165 cm)
- Weight: 132 lb (60 kg)
Medal record
Men's diving
Representing Mexico
Olympic Games
| Silver medal – second place | 2000 Sydney | 3m Springboard |
World Championships
| Silver medal – second place | 2001 Fukuoka | 10m Platform Synchro |
Pan American Games
| Gold medal – first place | 1995 Mar del Plata | 3m Springboard |
| Gold medal – first place | 1995 Mar del Plata | 10m Platform |
| Gold medal – first place | 1999 Winnipeg | 10m Platform |
| Silver medal – second place | 1995 Mar del Plata | 1m Springboard |
| Silver medal – second place | 1999 Winnipeg | 3m Springboard |
| Silver medal – second place | 2003 Santo Domingo | 3m Springboard |
| Silver medal – second place | 2003 Santo Domingo | Synchronized Platform |
Summer Universiade
| Gold medal – first place | 1995 Fukuoka | 3 m springboard |
| Silver medal – second place | 1993 Buffalo | 3 m springboard |
| Silver medal – second place | 1993 Buffalo | 10 m platform |
| Silver medal – second place | 1999 Palma de Mallorca | 10 m platform |
| Silver medal – second place | 2001 Beijing | 3 m springboard |
| Silver medal – second place | 2001 Beijing | Synchronized springboard |
| Silver medal – second place | 2001 Beijing | Team |
| Bronze medal – third place | 1995 Fukuoka | 10 m platform |

Fernando Fabricio Platas Álvarez (born March 16, 1973, in Mexico City) is a Mexican diver. He began diving since he was a young boy. In 1990 he won in Germany two tests of 2 and 10 metres, and in that same year he won three gold medals in the Central American Games which took place in Mexico City.

In 1992, he represented Mexico in the 1992 Summer Olympics in Barcelona, Spain and in 1993 he won a silver medal in the FINA Championships.

Winner of the silver medal in the FINA Championships, for 1999 he won the gold medal in the 3 metre springboard.

During the 2000 Summer Olympics in Sydney, Australia he won the silver medal in the 3 metre springboard.

In his résumé, he is also distinguished by winning the Sport National Award in 1995, and he has been twice the standard-bearer of the Mexican Olympic Delegation in the 2000 Summer Olympics and in the 2004 Summer Olympics, in Athens, Greece.

He ran the National Action Party federal deputy for the Federal Electoral District XXIV Mexico State in the elections of 2009.
