= Marie-Ève Marleau =

Canadian diver (born 1982)

Marie-Ève Marleau OLY
Personal information
- Born: February 12, 1982 (age 44) Labrador City, Newfoundland and Labrador, Canada
Medal record
Women's diving
Representing Canada
Pan American Games
Gold medal – first place	2007 Rio	10m synchro

Marie-Ève Marleau (born February 12, 1982) is a Canadian Olympic diver from Laval, Quebec. She was born in Labrador City, Newfoundland and Labrador, Canada.

== Bio ==
Marleau started as a gymnast, until switching over to diving.

The 10M synchro diving team of Marie-Ève and Émilie Heymans have won 4 international medals, including gold at the Pan American Games in 2007. They also won the silver medal at the 2008 FINA World Cup in Beijing.

She finished in 7th place for Canada in the Diving at the 2008 Summer Olympics - Women's 10 metre platform event at the 2008 Summer Olympics.

== External reference ==
- "2008 Beijing Olympics bio at Olympic.ca". Archived from the original on April 2, 2009.
- Bio at NBColympics.com
- Bio at Diving.ca
- Evans, Hilary; Gjerde, Arild; Heijmans, Jeroen; Mallon, Bill; et al. "Marie-Éve Marleau". Olympics at Sports-Reference.com. Sports Reference LLC. Archived from the original on 2015-10-02.
