= Yaima Mena =

Cuban diver (born 1985)

Personal information
- Full name: Yaima Rosario Mena Pena
- Born: 28 January 1985 (age 41) Cuba

Sport
- Sport: diving
Medal record
Representing Cuba
Pan American Games
Bronze medal – third place	2011 Guadalajara	10m platform synchro
- Updated on 26 May 2024

Yaima Rosario Mena Pena (born 28 January 1985) is a female diver from Cuba.

She competed at the 2015 World Aquatics Championships in the women's synchronized 10 metre platform.

== See also ==
- Cuba at the 2015 World Aquatics Championships
