= Sylvie Bernier =

Canadian diver (born 1964)

Sylvie Bernier CM CQ
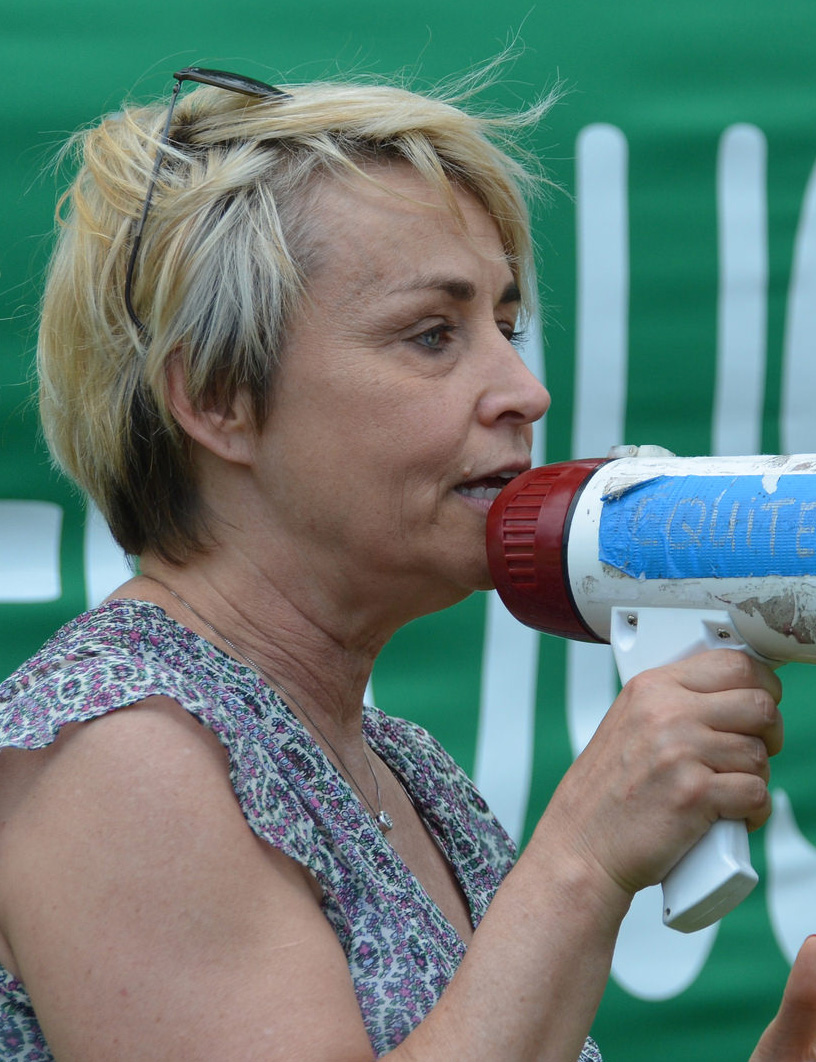

Personal information
- Nationality: Canadian
- Born: 31 January 1964 (age 62)

Sport
- Sport: Diving
Medal record
Women's diving
Representing Canada
Olympic Games
| Gold medal – first place | 1984 Los Angeles | 3 m springboard |
Commonwealth Games
| Silver medal – second place | 1982 Brisbane | 3 m springboard |
Pan American Games
| Bronze medal – third place | 1983 Caracas | 3 m springboard |
Universiade
| Bronze medal – third place | 1983 Edmonton | 3 m springboard |

Sylvie Bernier, CM, CQ (born January 31, 1964) is an Olympic athlete from Sainte-Foy, Quebec, Canada. She won the gold medal in the Women's 3m Springboard Diving at the 1984 Summer Olympics in Los Angeles.

Bernier announced her retirement from competitive diving in December 1984 and accepted a position as an advisor for the federal Department of Fitness and Amateur Sport. Immediately following her retirement, she began volunteering as a technical advisor with the association's youth development program in January 1985.

In June 1985, she was made a Knight of the National Order of Quebec and a Member of the Order of Canada, Canada's highest civilian honour.

She served as Assistant Chef de Mission for the Canadian Olympic Team at the 2006 Winter Olympics in Turin, Italy (Torino). She served as the Chef de Mission for Canada at the 2008 Olympic Games in Beijing, China and served again as Assistant Chef de Mission for the 2012 Olympic Games in London, United Kingdom .

She earned a degree in management from Télé-université (a component of UQAM) in 2003.

== Medals ==
- 1982 – Commonwealth Games → Silver
- 1983 – Pan-American Games → Bronze
- 1983 – FINA World Cup → Bronze
- 1983 – World University Games → Bronze
- 1984 – Summer Olympics → Gold

== See also ==
- List of members of the International Swimming Hall of Fame
