= Yolanda Ortíz (diver) =

Cuban diver

Personal information
- Full name: Yolanda Ortíz Espinosa
- Born: October 26, 1978 (age 47)
Medal record
Women's diving
Representing Cuba
Pan American Games
Bronze medal – third place	2003 Santo Domingo	10 m synchro

Yolanda Ortíz Espinosa (born October 26, 1978) is a female diver from Cuba. She represented her native country at two consecutive Summer Olympics, starting in 2000 (at Sydney, Australia).

She won a bronze medal at the 2003 Pan American Games alongside Iohana Cruz in the Women's 10m Platform Synchro event.
