= Cassius Duran =

Brazilian diver (born 1979)

Personal information
- Full name: Cassius Ricardo Duran
- Born: May 31, 1979 (age 47) São Paulo, Brazil
Medal record
Men's diving
Representing Brazil
Universiade
Bronze medal – third place	2005 İzmir	3 m springboard synchro
Bronze medal – third place	2005 İzmir	Team
Pan American Games
Silver medal – second place	2003 Santo Domingo	10m Platform

Cassius Ricardo Duran (born May 31, 1979 in São Paulo) is a male diver from Brazil. He represented his native country at three consecutive Summer Olympics, starting in 2000 (Sydney, Australia). Duran won a silver medal at the 2003 Pan American Games in Santo Domingo, Dominican Republic.

Nowadays, Cassius is training at APOE, in Rio de Janeiro.
