= Erick Fornaris =

Cuban diver (born 1979)

Personal information
- Full name: Erick Fornaris Álvarez
- Born: January 2, 1979 (age 47) Havana, Cuba
Medal record
Men's diving
Representing Cuba
Universiade
Silver medal – second place	2005 Izmir	Synchronized springboard
Bronze medal – third place	2001 Beijing	Synchronized platform
Pan American Games
Silver medal – second place	2003 Santo Domingo	3 m synchro
Silver medal – second place	2007 Rio de Janeiro	3 m synchro
Silver medal – second place	2007 Rio de Janeiro	10 m synchro
Central American and Caribbean Games
Gold medal – first place	2006 Cartagena	1 m springboard

Erick Fornaris Álvarez (born January 2, 1979, in Havana) is a male diver from Cuba. He represented his native country at three consecutive Summer Olympics, starting in 2000 (Sydney, Australia). Fornaris won two silver medals at the 2007 Pan American Games in Rio de Janeiro, Brazil.
