= Philippe Comtois =

Canadian diver (born 1976)

Personal information
- Born: August 25, 1976 (age 49) Montreal, Quebec, Canada

Sport
- Country: Canada
- Event(s): 1m, 3m synchro, 10m synchro
- Partner: Alexandre Despatie
Medal record
Men's Diving
Representing Canada
Summer Universiade
| Silver medal – second place | 1999 Palma | 1 m springboard |
Pan American Games
| Gold medal – first place | 2003 Santo Domingo | 3 m synchro |
| Gold medal – first place | 2003 Santo Domingo | 10 m synchro |

Philippe Comtois (French: [filip kɔ̃twa]; born August 25, 1976) is a Canadian diver. He was born in Montreal, Quebec. He began diving at age 9 and stopped diving in 2005. He finished his studies in accountancy at the Université du Québec à Montréal in April 2008.

He won a gold medal at the Canada Cup in the 3-metre springboard synchro in 2003. Comtois, who trains at Club de Plongeon CAMO, at the Complexe sportif Claude-Robillard in Montreal, was Alexandre Despatie's synchronized diving partner at the 2004 Summer Olympics in Athens. They finished in 3rd place in the 10 metre diving, after having won two gold the previous year at the 2003 Pan American Games. Since he has stopped diving, he now coaches in Laval, Québec at the "Club de plongeon Laval".
