= Tatiana Ortiz =

Mexican diver (born 1984)

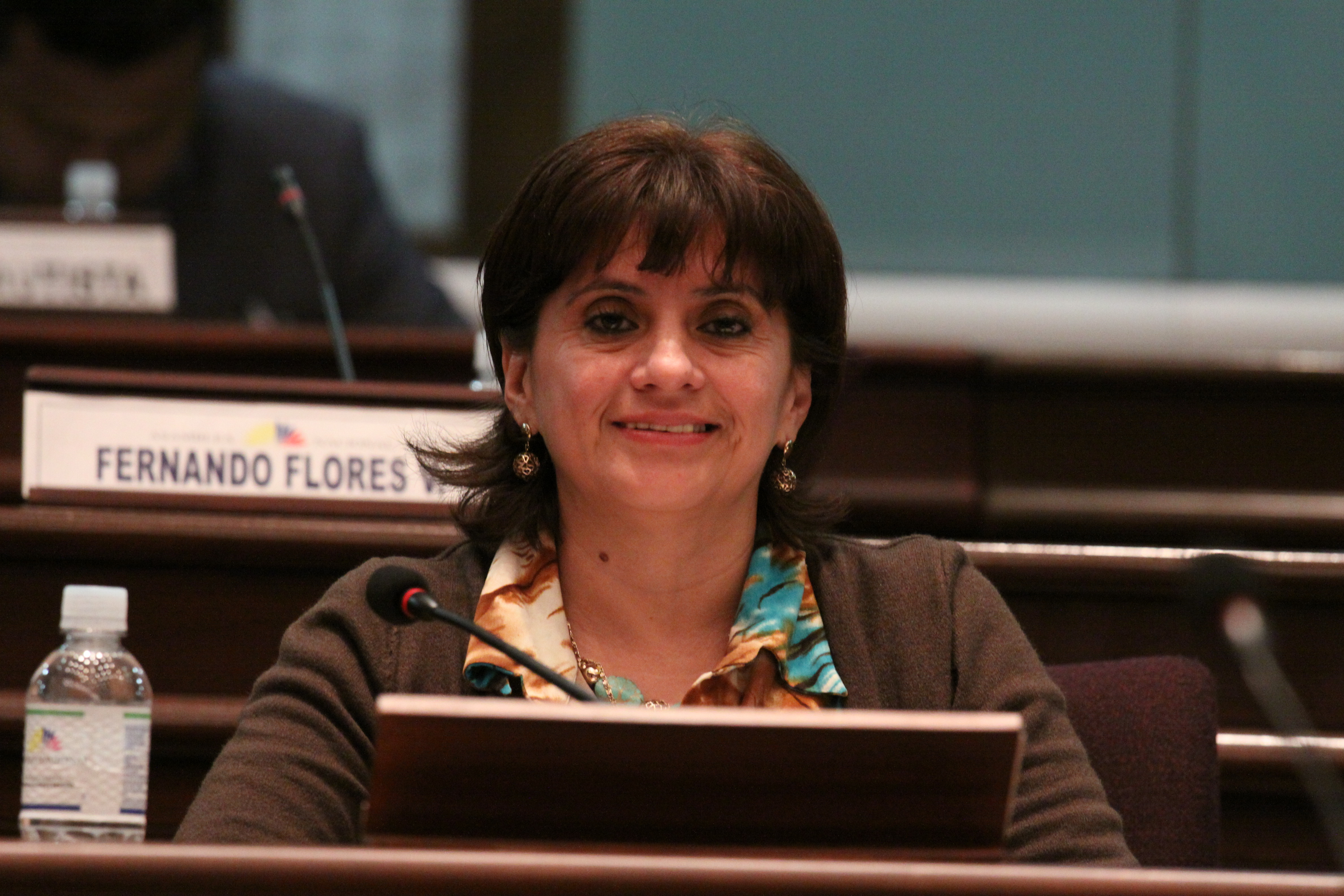

Personal information
- Born: January 12, 1984 (age 42)
Medal record
Women's diving
Representing Mexico
Olympic Games
Bronze medal – third place	2008 Beijing	Platform synchro
Pan American Games
Silver medal – second place	2007 Rio	Platform synchro
Silver medal – second place	2011 GDL	10 m platform
Summer Universiade
Gold medal – first place	2007 Bangkok	Team
Gold medal – first place	2007 Bangkok	Springboard synchro
Gold medal – first place	2007 Bangkok	Platform synchro
Silver medal – second place	2011 Shenzhen	Platform synchro
Central American and Caribbean Games
Gold medal – first place	2006 Cartagena	1 m springboard

Tatiana Ortiz Galicia (born January 12, 1984, in Mexico City) is a Mexican athlete who competes in diving and represented Mexico at the 2008 Summer Olympics in Beijing, where she won a bronze medal in the 10m Synchronized Platform with Paola Espinosa.
