= César Castro (diver) =

Brazilian diver (born 1982)

Personal information
- Full name: César Augusto Aquino de Castro
- Born: September 2, 1982 (age 43) Brasília, DF, Brazil

Sport
- Event: 3 m springboard
Medal record
Men's diving
Representing Brazil
Pan American Games
Silver medal – second place	2007 Rio de Janeiro	3 m springboard
Bronze medal – third place	2011 Guadalajara	3 m springboard
South American Games
Gold medal – first place	2014 Santiago	3m springboard
South American Championships
Gold medal – first place	2002 Belém	3m springboard
Gold medal – first place	2002 Belém	3m springboard
Gold medal – first place	2008 São Paulo	3m springboard
Gold medal – first place	2012 Belém	3m springboard
Gold medal – first place	2012 Belém	Synchro 3m springboard
Silver medal – second place	2002 Belém	1m springboard
Silver medal – second place	2008 São Paulo	1m springboard
Silver medal – second place	2012 Belém	1m springboard
Bronze medal – third place	2008 São Paulo	Synchro 3m springboard
Universiade
Silver medal – second place	2005 İzmir	3m springboard
Bronze medal – third place	2005 İzmir	Team
Bronze medal – third place	2005 İzmir	Synchro 3m springboard
Bronze medal – third place	2005 İzmir	1m springboard

César Augusto Aquino de Castro (Note: This name uses Portuguese naming customs: the first or maternal family name is Aquino and the second or paternal family name is Castro.) (born September 2, 1982) is a Brazilian competitive diver from Brasília, Distrito Federal. Castro has represented Brazil in four consecutive Olympics Summer Olympics, 2004 Summer Olympics in Athens Games, 2008 Summer Olympics in Beijing, 2012 Summer Olympics in London, and 2016 Summer Olympics in Rio de Janeiro.

For 2 times, 2004 Summer Olympics and 2016 Summer Olympics Castro reached the final and finished in 9th in men's individual 3m springboard. He placed 24th at the Beijing 2008 Summer Olympics and 17th at the London 2012 Olympics in the same event.

At the 2009 World Aquatics Championships in Rome, Italy, Cesar finished in 5th in the Men's 3m Springboard, the best result a Brazilian has ever achieved in the history of this championship.

Cesar Castro was the first Brazilian diver to receive a medal in an International Fédération internationale de natation (FINA) Diving Grand Prix. He was elected 9 times by the Brazilian Olympic Committee as the best Brazilian diver (2002, 2006, 2007, 2009, 2010, 2011, 2012, 2013, 2014). In 2004 Summer Olympics, Cesar Castro reached the Olympic Final, 52 years after the last Brazilian diver finalist in Olympic Games in Helsinki, Finland.

In other competitions, Castro frequently ranked top 10 in FINA world ranking; he was five times South American Champion (1997, 2002, 2006, 2012 and 2014) and has two Pan American Medals (silver, 2007 and bronze, 2011). Moreover, César Castro won four medals in the 2005 World University Games in İzmir Universiade, Turkey and holds the total of twelve medals of FINA International diving Grand Prix from the years 2002 to 2015.

César Castro has also won several Brazilian National Diving Championships 3m events and set numerous Brazilian national records. On the international diving stage, Cesar Castro qualified for and represented the Brazilian national Team at several distinguished international competitions such as the Pan American Games, FINA World Championships, FINA Diving World Cup, World Series, Summer Universiade and Summer Olympic Games.

In 2013, Cesar moved to Athens, Georgia where he trains at The University of Georgia with the coach Dan Laak. Since 2013, Cesar is also a volunteer diving coach of University of Georgia.

César earned his college degree in Physical Education from Universidade Católica de Brasília in 2005 and received his MBA degree in Marketing and Sports Business from Fundação Getulio Vargas in Rio de Janeiro, Brazil, in 2013. Since 2003, Cesar Castro is sponsored by Mackenzie Presbyterian University.

== Family ==
Castro is married and has two children, Samuel and Victor.

== FINA Diving Grand Prix results ==
3 m springboard

- (gold) 2013 FINA Diving Grand Prix (San Juan)
- (silver) 2003 FINA Diving Grand Prix (Rostock)
- (silver) 2005 FINA Diving Grand Prix (Ft. Lauderdale)
- (silver) 2006 FINA Diving Grand Prix (Rome)
- (silver) 2009 FINA Diving Grand Prix (Montreal)
- (silver) 2014 FINA Diving Grand Prix (San Juan)
- (silver) 2015 FINA Diving Grand Prix (San Juan)
- (bronze) 2002 FINA Diving Grand Prix (Coral Springs)
- (bronze) 2002 FINA Diving Grand Prix (Rome)
- (bronze) 2005 FINA Diving Grand Prix (Madrid)
- (bronze) 2011 FINA Diving Grand Prix (Madrid)
- (bronze) 2013 FINA Diving Grand Prix (San Juan) 3m sincro event
