= Juliana Veloso =

Brazilian diver (born 1980)

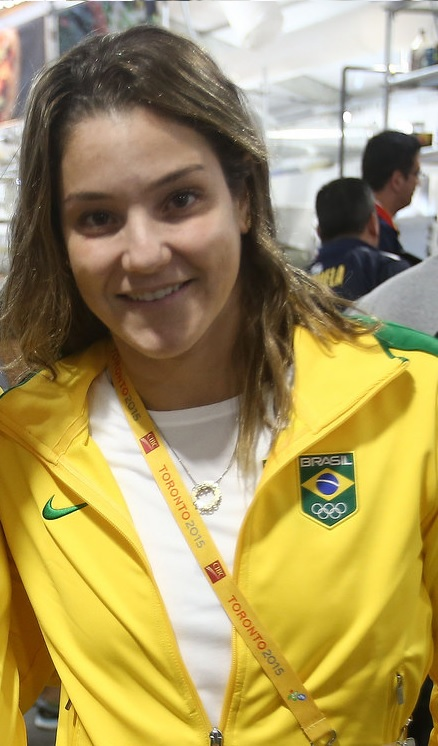
- 2015

Personal information
- Full name: Juliana Rodrigues Veloso
- Born: December 22, 1980 (age 45) Rio de Janeiro, Brazil
Medal record
Women's diving
Representing Brazil
Universiade
Bronze medal – third place	2005 İzmir	1m springboard
Pan American Games
Silver medal – second place	2003 Santo Domingo	10m platform
Bronze medal – third place	2003 Santo Domingo	3m springboard
Bronze medal – third place	2007 Rio de Janeiro	10m platform
South American Championships
Gold medal – first place	2008 São Paulo	10m platform
Gold medal – first place	2008 São Paulo	3m synchro
Silver medal – second place	2008 São Paulo	1m springboard
Bronze medal – third place	2008 São Paulo	3m springboard

Juliana Rodrigues Veloso (Note: This name uses Portuguese naming customs: the first or maternal family name is Rodrigues and the second or paternal family name is Veloso.) (born December 22, 1980, in Rio de Janeiro) is a female diver from Brazil who competed in five consecutive Summer Olympics for her native country, from Sydney 2000 to Rio 2016. She claimed two gold medals at the 2008 South American Swimming Championships in São Paulo.
