= Émilie Heymans =

Canadian diver (born 1981)

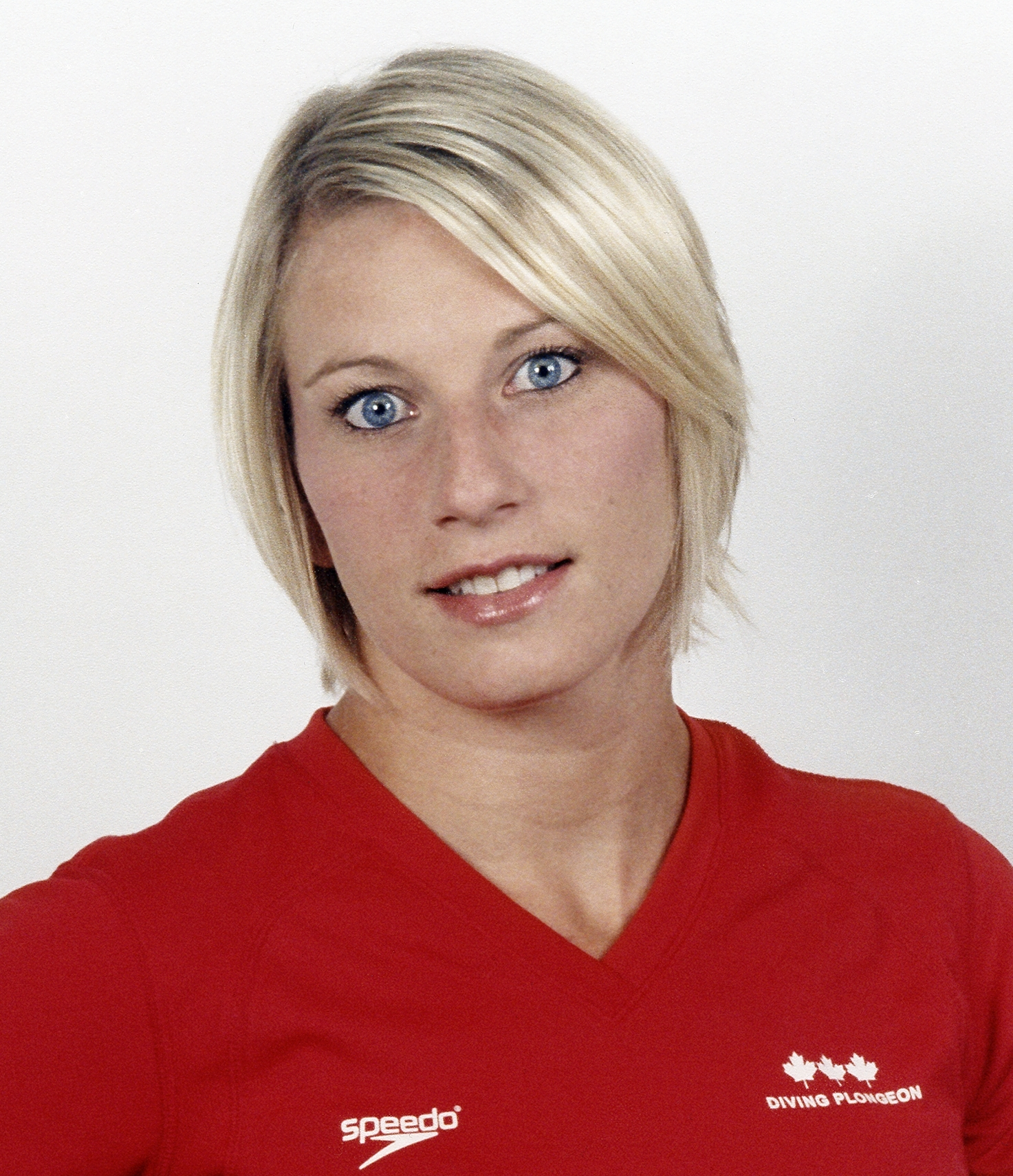
- Heymans in 2006

Personal information
- Full name: Émilie-Joane Heymans
- Born: December 14, 1981 (age 44) Brussels, Belgium
- Home town: Greenfield Park, Quebec, Canada
- Height: 1.70 m (5 ft 7 in)
- Weight: 57 kg (126 lb)

Sport
- Country: Canada
Medal record
Women's diving
Representing Canada
Olympic Games
Silver medal – second place	2000 Sydney	10 m synchro
Silver medal – second place	2008 Beijing	10 m platform
Bronze medal – third place	2004 Athens	10 m synchro
Bronze medal – third place	2012 London	3 m synchro
World Championships
Gold medal – first place	2003 Barcelona	10 m platform
Silver medal – second place	2009 Rome	3 m springboard
Silver medal – second place	2011 Shanghai	3 m synchro
Pan American Games
Gold medal – first place	1999 Winnipeg	10 m platform
Gold medal – first place	2003 Santo Domingo	10 m platform
Gold medal – first place	2003 Santo Domingo	3 m synchro
Gold medal – first place	2007 Rio de Janeiro	10 m synchro
Silver medal – second place	2003 Santo Domingo	3 m springboard
Silver medal – second place	2011 Guadalajara	3 m synchro
Commonwealth Games
Gold medal – first place	2010 Delhi	3 m synchro
Silver medal – second place	2002 Manchester	3 m springboard
Silver medal – second place	2002 Manchester	10 m platform
Bronze medal – third place	2006 Melbourne	10 m platform
Bronze medal – third place	2010 Delhi	1 m springboard

Émilie-Joane Heymans (born December 14, 1981) is a Canadian diver. She was born in Brussels, Belgium and raised in Greenfield Park, a suburb of Montreal. Heymans has won four Olympic medals, two bronze and two silver. She was the first female diver to win medals in four consecutive Olympic games and the first Canadian to win medals in four consecutive Olympics. Heymans also is a one time world champion and has won four Pan American championships as well as one Commonwealth Games championship. In addition she has won multiple medals in all three of these competitions.

== Career ==
Before becoming a diver, Heymans was a gymnast. She began diving in 1993, at age 11, after her coaches told her she did not have the physique to be a gymnast. Emilie made her international debut with Anne Montminy at the 2000 Olympic Games in Sydney, where they won a silver medal in the 10m synchronized diving event. Heymans then set her sights on the 10m platform and became the 2003 World Champion in Barcelona. At the 2004 Olympic Games in Athens, she proved herself again in the 10m synchronized diving event when she, along with teammate Blythe Hartley, took home the bronze medal.

Going into the 2008 Summer Olympics she failed to qualify with partner Marie-Eve Marleau in the platform synchro event, which was considered a huge upset. In order to qualify for the 2008 games, Heymans had to re-focus on the solo platform, an event where she had failed to medal in two Olympics in a row. Heymans won the silver medal at the Beijing 2008 Olympics in the 10m individual event, and only a solid final dive by the Chinese competitor kept her off of the top of the podium. This medal secured her recognition as an outstanding diver in both individual and synchronized diving events. She had won medals in three consecutive Olympics, achieved by only five other Canadian Olympians.

The years of abuse her body suffered as a result of platform diving caused pernicious neck and shoulder injuries, which compelled a switch to the springboard. In 2009, Heymans won the silver medal at the World Championships in Rome in the 3M springboard. In 2011, at the World Championships in Shanghai, Heymans, with partner Jennifer Abel, won the silver medal in the 3m synchro event.

At the 2012 Olympics, Émilie became the first Canadian Summer Olympian to win a medal in four straight Olympics, winning a bronze medal in 3m synchronized diving, along with partner Abel. Sylvie Bernier, a CBC Sports analyst and former gold medal diver, said of Heymans that "Emilie has won a medal at four straight Games and with three different partners. She has a quiet confidence and always believes she can do it. She doesn't need to tell the whole world." Heymans herself said of her record-setting medal, "It's awesome. I'm really happy that I was able to win my fourth medal with Jennifer. We worked really hard over the last two years."

In January 2013, Heymans retired from the sport.

== Personal life ==
Born in Brussels, Heymans moved with her family to Quebec after her mother competed at the 1976 Summer Olympics in Montreal as a fencer. Her mother, Marie-Paule Van Eyck, was an Olympic fencer for Belgium.

== Competitive history ==
- Heymans won a silver medal at the 2000 Summer Olympics in 10 m platform synchro with partner Anne Montminy.
- Heymans won a gold medal at the 2003 World Championships in Barcelona, Spain in the 10 m platform.
- Heymans won a bronze medal at the 2004 Summer Olympics in the 10 m platform synchro with partner Blythe Hartley.
- Heymans won silver at the 2008 Summer Olympics in the women's 10 metre platform event. This was the first individual Olympic medal for Heymans.
- Heymans won bronze at the 2012 Summer Olympics in the women's 3 metre springboard synchronized diving event, with partner Jennifer Abel.
