= Laura Sánchez (diver) =

Mexican diver

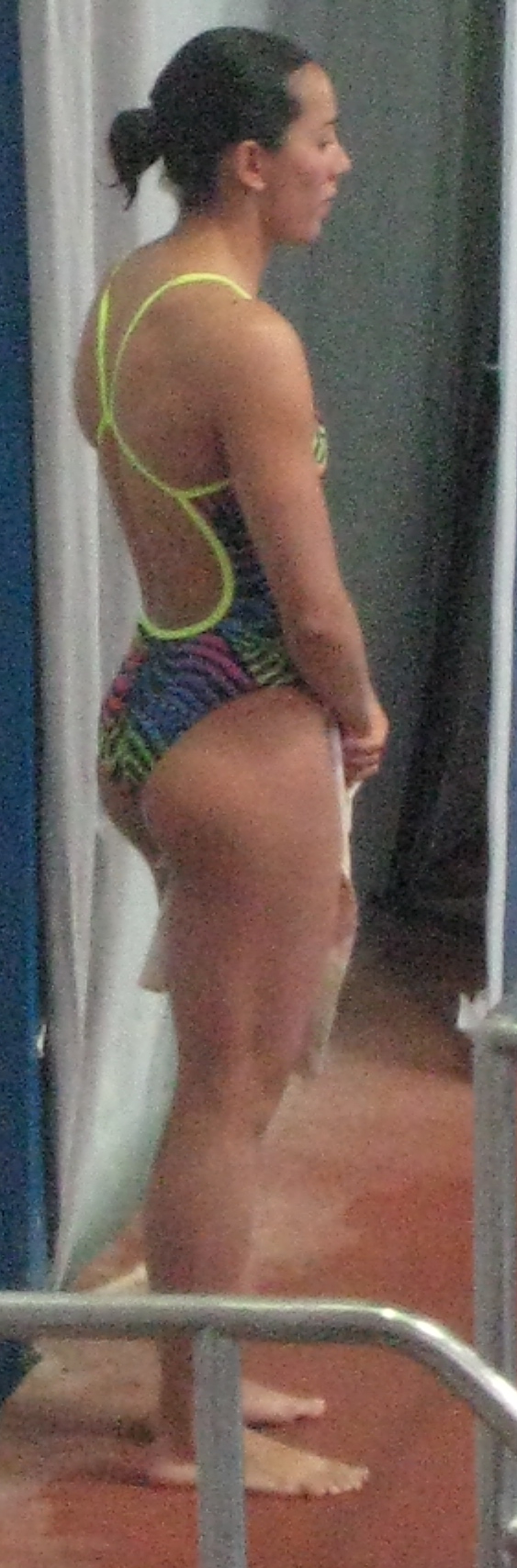
- Sánchez in 2013

Personal information
- Full name: Laura Aleida Sanchez Soto
- Born: October 16, 1985 (age 40) Guadalajara, Mexico
- Height: 1.65 m (5 ft 5 in)
Medal record
Women's diving
Representing Mexico
Olympic Games
Bronze medal – third place	2012 London	3 m springboard
World Championships
Bronze medal – third place	2003 Barcelona	3 m synchro
Pan American Games
Gold medal – first place	2007 Rio de Janeiro	3 m synchro
Gold medal – first place	2011 Guadalajara	3 m springboard
Gold medal – first place	2011 Guadalajara	3 m synchro
Silver medal – second place	2003 Santo Domingo	3 m synchro
Silver medal – second place	2003 Santo Domingo	10 m synchro
Silver medal – second place	2007 Rio de Janeiro	3 m springboard
Summer Universiade
Gold medal – first place	2007 Bangkok	Team
Gold medal – first place	2009 Belgrade	Team
Gold medal – first place	2009 Belgrade	3 m synchro
Silver medal – second place	2009 Belgrade	3 m springboard
Central American and Caribbean Games
Gold medal – first place	2006 Cartagena	3 m springboard

Laura Aleida Sánchez Soto (born October 16, 1985, in Guadalajara) is a Mexican female diver. She has represented her native country at three consecutive Summer Olympics, starting in 2004 (Athens, Greece). Sánchez scored her first Olympic medal on August 5, 2012, in London when she won the bronze in 3 meter springboard diving.

Sánchez also won two gold medals at the Pan American Games in 2011, one gold and one silver in 2007, and two silver in 2003.
