= Diving at the 2011 Pan American Games =

- Venue: Scotiabank Aquatics Center
- Dates: October 26 – October 29
- Competitors: 60 from 10 nations

Diving competitions at the 2011 Pan American Games in Guadalajara were held from October 26 to October 29, at the Scotiabank Aquatics Center. The winner of each individual event earned their NOC a quota spot to compete at the 2012 Summer Olympics in London, Great Britain.

== Medal summary ==
=== Medal table ===
* Host nation (Mexico)

Rank	Nation	Gold	Silver	Bronze	Total
1	Mexico*	8	3	1	12
2	Canada	0	2	2	4
3	United States	0	2	1	3
4	Cuba	0	1	2	3
5	Brazil	0	0	1	1
5	Colombia	0	0	1	1
Totals (6 entries)		8	8	8	24

=== Men's events ===
Event	Gold	Silver	Bronze
3 metre springboard	Yahel Castillo; Mexico	Julián Sánchez; Mexico	César Castro; Brazil
10 metre platform	Iván García; Mexico	Rommel Pacheco; Mexico	Sebastián Villa; Colombia
Synchronized; 3 metre springboard	Mexico; Yahel Castillo; Julián Sánchez	United States; Troy Dumais; Kristian Ipsen	Cuba; Rene Hernandez; Jorge Pupo
Synchronized; 10 metre platform	Mexico; Iván García; Germán Sánchez	Cuba; Jeinkler Aguirre; Jose Guerra	Canada; Kevin Geyson; Eric Sehn

=== Women's events ===
Event	Gold	Silver	Bronze
3 metre springboard	Laura Sánchez; Mexico	Cassidy Krug; United States	Paola Espinosa; Mexico
10 metre platform	Paola Espinosa; Mexico	Tatiana Ortiz; Mexico	Meaghan Benfeito; Canada
Synchronized; 3 metre springboard	Mexico; Paola Espinosa; Laura Sánchez	Canada; Jennifer Abel; Emilie Heymans	United States; Kassidy Cook; Cassidy Krug
Synchronized; 10 metre platform	Mexico; Paola Espinosa; Tatiana Ortiz	Canada; Meaghan Benfeito; Roseline Filion	Cuba; Yaima Mena; Annia Rivera

== Schedule ==
All times are Central Daylight Time (UTC-5).

Day	Date	Start	Finish	Event	Phase
Day 13	Wednesday October 26, 2011	10:00	11:30	Women's 10 metre platform	Preliminaries
Day 13	Wednesday October 26, 2011	19:30	23:00	Men's synchronized 3 metre springboard	Finals
Day 13	Wednesday October 26, 2011	19:30	23:00	Women's 10 metre platform	Finals
Day 14	Thursday October 27, 2011	10:00	11:30	Men's 3 metre springboard	Preliminaries
Day 14	Thursday October 27, 2011	19:30	23:00	Women's synchronized 10 metre platform	Finals
Day 14	Thursday October 27, 2011	19:30	23:00	Men's 3 metre springboard	Finals
Day 15	Friday October 28, 2011	10:00	11:30	Women's 3 metre springboard	Preliminaries
Day 15	Friday October 28, 2011	19:30	23:00	Men's synchronized 10 metre platform	Finals
Day 15	Friday October 28, 2011	19:30	23:00	Women's 3 metre springboard	Finals
Day 16	Saturday October 29, 2011	10:00	11:30	Men's 10 metre platform	Preliminaries
Day 16	Saturday October 29, 2011	19:30	23:00	Women's synchronized 3 metre springboard	Finals
Day 16	Saturday October 29, 2011	19:30	23:00	Men's 10 metre platform	Finals

=== Qualification summary ===
The following countries have entered athletes:

Nation	Synchronized Diving				Individual Diving				Total	
Nation	Men's 3m	Men's 10m	Women's 3m	Women's 10m	Men's 3m	Men's 10m	Women's 3m	Women's 10m	Quotas	Athletes
Brazil	X	X	X	X	2	2	2	2	8	8
Canada	X	X	X	X	2	2	2	2	8	8
Chile	X		X		2		2		4	4
Colombia	X	X			1	2	2	1	6	5
Cuba	X	X	X	X	2	2	2	1	7	8
Dominican Republic					1	1			2	1
Mexico	X	X	X	X	2	2	2	2	8	8
Puerto Rico					1	1	1	1	4	3
United States	X	X	X	X	1	2	1	2	9	8
Venezuela	X	X	X	X	2	2	2	2	8	7
Total: 10 NOCs	8	7	6	6	16	16	16	12	60	60

== See also ==
- Diving at the 2012 Summer Olympics
