= Juan Urán =

Colombian diver (born 1983)

Personal information
- Full name: Juan Guillermo Urán Salazar
- Born: January 3, 1983 (age 43) Medellín, Antioquia, Colombia
Medal record
Men's diving
Representing Colombia
Pan American Games
Bronze medal – third place	2007 Rio de Janeiro	10m synchro
Central American and Caribbean Games
Silver medal – second place	2006 Cartagena	10m platform
Bronze medal – third place	2006 Cartagena	3m springboard
South American Championships
Gold medal – first place	2008 São Paulo	10m platform
Gold medal – first place	2008 São Paulo	10m synchro
Silver medal – second place	2008 São Paulo	3m synchro
Bronze medal – third place	2008 São Paulo	3m springboard

Juan Guillermo Urán Salazar (born January 3, 1983, in Medellín, Antioquia) is a male diver from Colombia, who competed in three consecutive Summer Olympics for his native country, starting in 2000. He claimed two gold medals at the 2008 South American Swimming Championships in São Paulo.

In the Olympic Games of Beijing 2008, he and his teammate Víctor Ortega reached the rank six in the 10m synchronized platform event, the best position ever achieved by a Colombian diver in that particular event so far.
