= Paola Espinosa =

Mexican diver (born 1986)

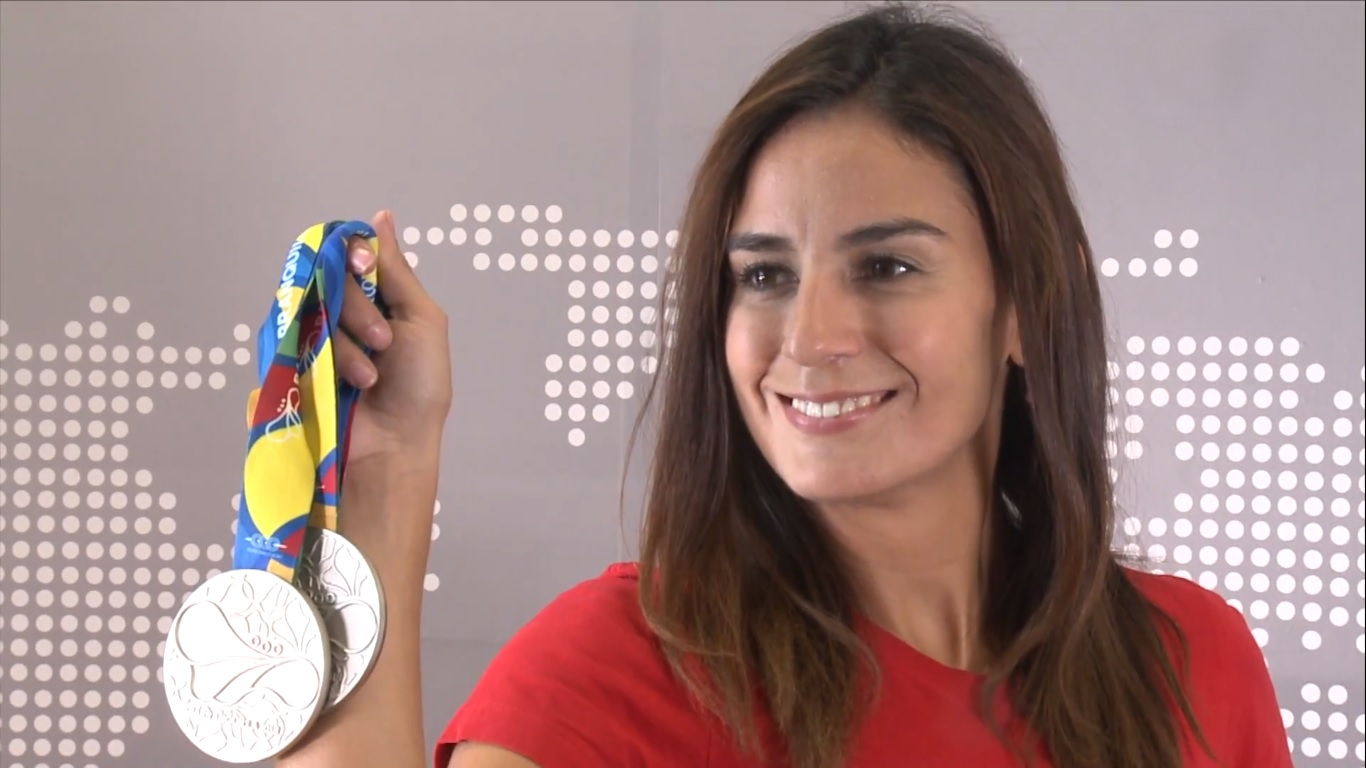

Personal information
- Full name: Paola Milagros Espinosa Sánchez
- Born: 31 July 1986 (age 40) Mexico City, Mexico
- Height: 1.56 m (5 ft 1 in)
- Weight: 48 kg (106 lb)

Sport
- Country: Mexico
- Sport: Diving
- Events: 3 m, 3 m synchro, 10 m, 10 m synchro
- Partner: Melany Hernández
- Former partners: Laura Sánchez, Tatiana Ortiz, Alejandra Orozco
Medal record
Women's diving
Representing Mexico
Olympic Games
Silver medal – second place	2012 London	10 m synchro
Bronze medal – third place	2008 Beijing	10 m synchro
World Championships
Gold medal – first place	2009 Rome	10 m platform
Bronze medal – third place	2003 Barcelona	3 m synchro
Bronze medal – third place	2011 Shanghai	10 m platform
Bronze medal – third place	2019 Gwangju	3 m synchro
Pan American Games
Gold medal – first place	2007 Rio de Janeiro	3 m springboard
Gold medal – first place	2007 Rio de Janeiro	10 m platform
Gold medal – first place	2007 Rio de Janeiro	3 m synchro
Gold medal – first place	2011 Guadalajara	10 m platform
Gold medal – first place	2011 Guadalajara	10 m synchro
Gold medal – first place	2011 Guadalajara	3 m synchro
Gold medal – first place	2015 Toronto	10 m platform
Gold medal – first place	2015 Toronto	3 m synchro
Silver medal – second place	2003 Santo Domingo	10 m synchro
Silver medal – second place	2003 Santo Domingo	3 m synchro
Silver medal – second place	2007 Rio de Janeiro	10 m synchro
Bronze medal – third place	2011 Guadalajara	3 m springboard
Bronze medal – third place	2015 Toronto	10 m synchro
Bronze medal – third place	2019 Lima	1 m springboard
Bronze medal – third place	2019 Lima	3 m synchro
Summer Universiade
Gold medal – first place	2007 Bangkok	Team
Gold medal – first place	2007 Bangkok	3 m synchro
Gold medal – first place	2007 Bangkok	10 m synchro
Gold medal – first place	2009 Belgrade	Team
Gold medal – first place	2009 Belgrade	10 m platform
Gold medal – first place	2009 Belgrade	3 m synchro
Gold medal – first place	2011 Shenzhen	10 m platform
Silver medal – second place	2005 İzmir	Team
Silver medal – second place	2005 İzmir	3 m synchro
Silver medal – second place	2007 Bangkok	10 m platform
Silver medal – second place	2009 Belgrade	10 m synchro
Silver medal – second place	2011 Shenzhen	10 m synchro
Bronze medal – third place	2005 İzmir	3 m springboard
Bronze medal – third place	2005 İzmir	10 m synchro
Bronze medal – third place	2007 Bangkok	3 m springboard
Bronze medal – third place	2009 Belgrade	3 m springboard
Bronze medal – third place	2011 Shenzhen	3 m springboard
Bronze medal – third place	2013 Kazan	Team
Bronze medal – third place	2013 Kazan	10 m synchro

Paola Milagros Espinosa Sánchez (born 31 July 1986) is a Mexican diver and represented Mexico at the 2004 Summer Olympics in Athens, the 2008 Summer Olympics in Beijing, where she was her national team's flagbearer, and the 2012 Summer Olympics in London.

In 1987, the Espinosa Sánchez family moved to La Paz from Mexico City with Paola, who was barely nine months old.

In Athens in 2004, from speciality platform jumps of 10 meters, she placed in the individual jump and fifth in synchronized jumps. In the synchronized jumps, she participated with Tatiana Ortiz, who was also an Olympic medalist.

On August 8, 2008, she was the champion of the Mexico national team at the Opening ceremony of the Beijing 2008 Olympic Games at the National Stadium in Beijing. She won a bronze medal in the Women's Synchronized 10-meter Platform at the 2008 Summer Olympics in Beijing on 12 August 2008 with a score of 330.06. She won silver medal in the same event at the 2012 Summer Olympics with a score of 343.32 on Tuesday, 31 July 2012.

Espinosa won the gold medal in the 10-meter platform at the 2009 World Aquatics Championships in Rome with a score of 428.25. The silver medal was won by the Chinese athlete Chen Ruolin, who is also an Olympian, with a score of 417.60. The bronze medal was given to the Chinese athlete Kang Li, who had a score of 410.35.

In 2011, she participated at the 2011 Pan American Games where she won the gold medal at the 10-meter platform individual and synchronized events, as well as gold in the 3-meter synchronized springboard event. She has won a total of 13 medals at the Pan American Games, 8 of them gold.

On Tuesday, 31 July 2012, in the Olympic Games in London, she won a silver medal in the 10-meter synchronized platform together with Alejandra Orozco, with a score of 343.32.

She was also the champion of the Central America and Caribbean Games in Mayaguez 2010.

== International Games ==
=== Olympic Games ===
- Beijing 2008: Espinosa won the bronze medal in synchronized jumps from the 10-meter platform along with Tatiana Ortiz during the Beijing Olympic Games in 2008. She was commissioned to lead the Mexican delegation during the opening ceremony, carrying the national flag. She was fourth in the individual event, with Tatiana placing fifth.
- London 2012: She won a silver medal in synchronized diving from the 10-meter level along with Alejandra Orozco during the London Olympic Games in 2012. She was competing in the Olympics while celebrating her 26th birthday. Espinosa thereby became the first Mexican athlete to get two medals in different Olympic events. In the individual jump, she came in sixth.
- Río 2016: She competed in the 10-meter jump together with Alejandra Orozco during the Rio Olympic Games in 2016 and finished sixth, while individually she finished fourth.

=== World Championships ===
- Barcelona 2003: Together with Laura Sánchez, she achieved third place in the synchronized jump from 3 meters, and with this, won the bronze medal.
- Rome 2009: Rome was the place where she became a world champion. Paola won first in the 10-meter platform with perfect scores. Her victory made her the first Mexican diver to win a world title.
- Shanghai 2011: During the 2011 championships, Paola was not able to defend her title. She finished third behind the Chinese divers Chen Ruolin and Hu Yadan.

=== Pan-American Games ===
During the Pan-American Games which were held in Santo Domingo, she won, together with Laura Sánchez, two silver medals in synchronized diving, the first in 3-meter platform and the other in the 10-meter platform. Four years later, she was even more outstanding, having won three gold medals and one silver medal. On 26 October 2011, in the city of Guadalajara, Jalisco, Mexico, she won the gold medal in the 10-meter platform.

Central American and Caribbean Games She was recognized as the first athlete with the most number of medals from Mexico in the 2010 Central American and Caribbean Games. Her performance in the 21st edition of the games included earning a total of three medals; a gold in the 10-meter platform, a gold in the 1-meter springboard, and a gold in the 3-meter springboard.

University At Kazan University in 2013, she won a bronze medal in the synchronized dive and fourth in the individual dive.

== Swimwear ==
=== Arena ===
- ARN-5002
- ARN-6004W RYAB
- ARN-6018 BLU
- FAR-9543 WHT

== Political career ==
In the 2024 general election, she was elected to the federal Chamber of Deputies to represent Jalisco's 8th district for the National Action Party (PAN). She had also contended unsuccessfully for a plurinominal congressional seat (2nd region) on the Ecologist Green Party of Mexico (PVEM) ticket in the 2021 mid-terms.
