= List of World Aquatics Championships medalists in diving =

This is the complete list of the World Aquatics Championships medalists in diving from 1973 to 2025.

== Men ==
Bold numbers in brackets denotes record number of victories in corresponding disciplines.

=== 1 metre springboard ===
Games	Gold	Silver	Bronze
1991 Perth	Edwin Jongejans; Netherlands	Mark Lenzi; United States	Wang Yijie; China
1994 Rome	Evan Stewart; Zimbabwe	Lan Wei; China	Brian Earley; United States
1998 Perth	Yu Zhuocheng; China	Troy Dumais; United States	Holger Schlepps; Germany
2001 Fukuoka	Wang Feng; China	Wang Tianling; China	Alexander Dobroskok; Russia
2003 Barcelona	Xu Xiang; China	Wang Kenan; China	Joona Puhakka; Finland
2005 Montreal	Alexandre Despatie; Canada	Xu Xiang; China	Wang Feng; China
2007 Melbourne	Luo Yutong; China	He Chong; China	Christopher Sacchin; Italy
2009 Rome	Qin Kai; China	Zhang Xinhua; China	Matthew Mitcham; Australia
2011 Shanghai	Li Shixin; China	He Min; China	Pavlo Rozenberg; Germany
2013 Barcelona	Li Shixin (2); China	Illya Kvasha; Ukraine	Kevin Chávez; Mexico
2015 Kazan	Xie Siyi; China	Illya Kvasha; Ukraine	Michael Hixon; United States
2017 Budapest	Peng Jianfeng; China	He Chao; China	Giovanni Tocci; Italy
2019 Gwangju	Wang Zongyuan; China	Rommel Pacheco; Mexico	Peng Jianfeng; China
2022 Budapest	Wang Zongyuan (2); China	Jack Laugher; Great Britain	Li Shixin; Australia
2023 Fukuoka	Peng Jianfeng (2); China	Osmar Olvera; Mexico	Zheng Jiuyuan; China
2024 Doha	Osmar Olvera; Mexico	Li Shixin; Australia	Ross Haslam; Great Britain
2025 Singapore	Zheng Jiuyuan; China	Osmar Olvera; Mexico	Yan Siyu; China

Medal table

Rank	Nation	Gold	Silver	Bronze	Total
1	China	13	8	5	26
2	Mexico	1	3	1	5
3	Canada	1	0	0	1
3	Netherlands	1	0	0	1
3	Zimbabwe	1	0	0	1
6	United States	0	2	2	4
7	Ukraine	0	2	0	2
8	Australia	0	1	2	3
9	Great Britain	0	1	1	2
10	Germany	0	0	2	2
10	Italy	0	0	2	2
12	Finland	0	0	1	1
12	Russia	0	0	1	1
Totals (13 entries)		17	17	17	51

=== 3 metre springboard ===
Games	Gold	Silver	Bronze
1973 Belgrade	Phil Boggs; United States	Klaus Dibiasi; Italy	Keith Russell; United States
1975 Cali	Phil Boggs; United States	Klaus Dibiasi; Italy	Vyacheslav Strakhov; Soviet Union
1978 West Berlin	Phil Boggs (3); United States	Falk Hoffmann; East Germany	Giorgio Cagnotto; Italy
1982 Guayaquil	Greg Louganis; United States	Sergei Kuzmin; Soviet Union	Aleksandr Portnov; Soviet Union
1986 Madrid	Greg Louganis; United States	Tan Liangde; China	Li Hongping; China
1991 Perth	Kent Ferguson; United States	Tan Liangde; China	Albin Killat; Germany
1994 Rome	Yu Zhuocheng; China	Dmitri Sautin; Russia	Wang Tianling; China
1998 Perth	Dmitri Sautin; Russia	Zhou Yilin; China	Vassili Lisovski; Russia
2001 Fukuoka	Dmitri Sautin; Russia	Wang Tianling; China	Ken Terauchi; Japan
2003 Barcelona	Aleksandr Dobroskok; Russia	Peng Bo; China	Dmitri Sautin; Russia
2005 Montreal	Alexandre Despatie; Canada	Troy Dumais; United States	He Chong; China
2007 Melbourne	Qin Kai; China	Alexandre Despatie; Canada	Dmitry Sautin; Russia
2009 Rome	He Chong; China	Troy Dumais; United States	Alexandre Despatie; Canada
2011 Shanghai	He Chong; China	Ilya Zakharov; Russia	Evgeny Kuznetsov; Russia
2013 Barcelona	He Chong (3); China	Evgeny Kuznetsov; Russia	Yahel Castillo; Mexico
2015 Kazan	He Chao; China	Ilya Zakharov; Russia	Jack Laugher; Great Britain
2017 Budapest	Xie Siyi; China	Patrick Hausding; Germany	Ilya Zakharov; Russia
2019 Gwangju	Xie Siyi; China	Cao Yuan; China	Jack Laugher; Great Britain
2022 Budapest	Wang Zongyuan; China	Cao Yuan; China	Jack Laugher; Great Britain
2023 Fukuoka	Wang Zongyuan; China	Osmar Olvera; Mexico	Long Daoyi; China
2024 Doha	Wang Zongyuan (3); China	Xie Siyi; China	Osmar Olvera; Mexico
2025 Singapore	Osmar Olvera; Mexico	Cao Yuan; China	Wang Zongyuan; China

Medal table

Rank	Nation	Gold	Silver	Bronze	Total
1	China	11	9	5	25
2	United States	6	2	1	9
3	Russia	3	4	5	12
4	Mexico	1	1	2	4
5	Canada	1	1	1	3
6	Italy	0	2	1	3
7	Soviet Union	0	1	2	3
8	Germany	0	1	1	2
9	East Germany	0	1	0	1
10	Great Britain	0	0	3	3
11	Japan	0	0	1	1
Totals (11 entries)		22	22	22	66

=== 10 metre platform ===
Games	Gold	Silver	Bronze
1973 Belgrade	Klaus Dibiasi; Italy	Keith Russell; United States	Falk Hoffmann; East Germany
1975 Cali	Klaus Dibiasi; Italy	Nikolay Mikhailin; Soviet Union	Carlos Girón; Mexico
1978 West Berlin	Greg Louganis; United States	Falk Hoffmann; East Germany	Vladimir Aleynik; Soviet Union
1982 Guayaquil	Greg Louganis; United States	Vladimir Aleynik; Soviet Union	Bruce Kimball; United States
1986 Madrid	Greg Louganis (3); United States	Li Kongzheng; China	Bruce Kimball; United States
1991 Perth	Sun Shuwei; China	Xiong Ni; China	Giorgi Chogovadze; Soviet Union
1994 Rome	Dmitri Sautin; Russia	Sun Shuwei; China	Vladimir Timoshinin; Russia
1998 Perth	Dmitri Sautin; Russia	Tian Liang; China	Jan Hempel; Germany
2001 Fukuoka	Tian Liang; China	Alexandre Despatie; Canada	Mathew Helm; Australia
2003 Barcelona	Alexandre Despatie; Canada	Mathew Helm; Australia	Tian Liang; China
2005 Montreal	Hu Jia; China	José Guerra; Cuba	Gleb Galperin; Russia
2007 Melbourne	Gleb Galperin; Russia	Zhou Lüxin; China	Lin Yue; China
2009 Rome	Tom Daley; Great Britain	Qiu Bo; China	Zhou Lüxin; China
2011 Shanghai	Qiu Bo; China	David Boudia; United States	Sascha Klein; Germany
2013 Barcelona	Qiu Bo; China	David Boudia; United States	Sascha Klein; Germany
2015 Kazan	Qiu Bo (3); China	David Boudia; United States	Tom Daley; Great Britain
2017 Budapest	Tom Daley; Great Britain	Chen Aisen; China	Yang Jian; China
2019 Gwangju	Yang Jian; China	Yang Hao; China	Aleksandr Bondar; Russia
2022 Budapest	Yang Jian; China	Rikuto Tamai; Japan	Yang Hao; China
2023 Fukuoka	Cassiel Rousseau; Australia	Lian Junjie; China	Yang Hao; China
2024 Doha	Yang Hao; China	Cao Yuan; China	Oleksiy Sereda; Ukraine
2025 Singapore	Cassiel Rousseau; Australia	Oleksiy Sereda; Ukraine	Randal Willars; Mexico

Medal table

Rank	Nation	Gold	Silver	Bronze	Total
1	China	9	10	6	25
2	United States	3	4	2	9
3	Russia	3	0	3	6
4	Australia	2	1	1	4
5	Great Britain	2	0	1	3
6	Italy	2	0	0	2
7	Canada	1	1	0	2
8	Soviet Union	0	2	2	4
9	East Germany	0	1	1	2
9	Ukraine	0	1	1	2
11	Cuba	0	1	0	1
11	Japan	0	1	0	1
13	Germany	0	0	3	3
14	Mexico	0	0	2	2
Totals (14 entries)		22	22	22	66

=== Synchronized 3 metre springboard ===
Games	Gold	Silver	Bronze
1998 Perth	Xu Hao and Yu Zhuocheng (CHN)	Alexander Mesch and Holger Schlepps (GER)	Dean Pullar and Shannon Roy (AUS)
2001 Fukuoka	Peng Bo and Wang Kenan (CHN)	Fernando Platas and Joel Rodríguez (MEX)	Alexander Dobroskok and Dmitri Sautin (RUS)
2003 Barcelona	Aleksandr Dobroskok and Dmitri Sautin (RUS)	Wang Feng and Wang Tianling (CHN)	Tobias Schellenberg and Andreas Wels (GER)
2005 Montreal	He Chong and Wang Feng (CHN)	Tobias Schellenberg and Andreas Wels (GER)	Justin Dumais and Troy Dumais (USA)
2007 Melbourne	Qin Kai and Wang Feng (CHN)	Alexandre Despatie and Arturo Miranda (CAN)	Tobias Schellenberg and Andreas Wels (GER)
2009 Rome	Qin Kai and Wang Feng (CHN)	Troy Dumais and Kristian Ipsen (USA)	Alexandre Despatie and Reuben Ross (CAN)
2011 Shanghai	Luo Yutong and Qin Kai (CHN)	Evgeny Kuznetsov and Ilya Zakharov (RUS)	Yahel Castillo and Julián Sánchez (MEX)
2013 Barcelona	He Chong and Qin Kai (CHN)	Evgeny Kuznetsov and Ilya Zakharov (RUS)	Jahir Ocampo and Rommel Pacheco (MEX)
2015 Kazan	Cao Yuan and Qin Kai (5) (CHN)	Evgeny Kuznetsov and Ilya Zakharov (RUS)	Jack Laugher and Chris Mears (GBR)
2017 Budapest	Evgeny Kuznetsov and Ilya Zakharov (RUS)	Cao Yuan and Xie Siyi (CHN)	Oleh Kolodiy and Illya Kvasha (UKR)
2019 Gwangju	Cao Yuan and Xie Siyi (CHN)	Daniel Goodfellow and Jack Laugher (GBR)	Yahel Castillo and Juan Celaya (MEX)
2022 Budapest	Cao Yuan and Wang Zongyuan (CHN)	Anthony Harding and Jack Laugher (GBR)	Timo Barthel and Lars Rüdiger (GER)
2023 Fukuoka	Long Daoyi and Wang Zongyuan (CHN)	Anthony Harding and Jack Laugher (GBR)	Jules Bouyer and Alexis Jandard (FRA)
2024 Doha	Long Daoyi and Wang Zongyuan (CHN)	Lorenzo Marsaglia and Giovanni Tocci (ITA)	Adrián Abadía and Nicolás García (ESP)
2025 Singapore	Wang Zongyuan and Zheng Jiuyuan (CHN)	Juan Celaya and Osmar Olvera (MEX)	Anthony Harding and Jack Laugher (GBR)

Medal table

Rank	Nation	Gold	Silver	Bronze	Total
1	China	13	2	0	15
2	Russia	2	3	1	6
3	Great Britain	0	3	2	5
4	Germany	0	2	3	5
4	Mexico	0	2	3	5
6	Canada	0	1	1	2
6	United States	0	1	1	2
8	Italy	0	1	0	1
9	Australia	0	0	1	1
9	France	0	0	1	1
9	Spain	0	0	1	1
9	Ukraine	0	0	1	1
Totals (12 entries)		15	15	15	45

=== Synchronized 10 metre platform ===
Games	Gold	Silver	Bronze
1998 Perth	Sun Shuwei and Tian Liang (CHN)	Jan Hempel and Michael Kühne (GER)	Igor Lukashin and Aleksandr Varlamov (RUS)
2001 Fukuoka	Hu Jia and Tian Liang (CHN)	Fernando Platas and Eduardo Rueda (MEX)	Roman Volodkov and Anton Zakharov (UKR)
2003 Barcelona	Mathew Helm and Robert Newbery (AUS)	Roman Volodkov and Anton Zakharov (UKR)	Hu Jia and Tian Liang (CHN)
2005 Montreal	Dmitry Dobroskok and Gleb Galperin (RUS)	Hu Jia and Yang Jinghui (CHN)	Leon Taylor and Peter Waterfield (GBR)
2007 Melbourne	Huo Liang and Lin Yue (CHN)	Dmitry Dobroskok and Gleb Galperin (RUS)	David Boudia and Thomas Finchum (USA)
2009 Rome	Huo Liang and Lin Yue (CHN)	David Boudia and Thomas Finchum (USA)	Jeinkler Aguirre and José Guerra (CUB)
2011 Shanghai	Huo Liang and Qiu Bo (CHN)	Patrick Hausding and Sascha Klein (GER)	Oleksandr Bondar and Oleksandr Gorshkovozov (UKR)
2013 Barcelona	Patrick Hausding and Sascha Klein (GER)	Artem Chesakov and Viktor Minibaev (RUS)	Cao Yuan and Zhang Yanquan (CHN)
2015 Kazan	Chen Aisen and Lin Yue (CHN)	Iván García and Germán Sánchez (MEX)	Roman Izmailov and Viktor Minibaev (RUS)
2017 Budapest	Chen Aisen and Yang Hao (CHN)	Aleksandr Bondar and Viktor Minibaev (RUS)	Patrick Hausding and Sascha Klein (GER)
2019 Gwangju	Cao Yuan and Chen Aisen (CHN)	Aleksandr Bondar and Viktor Minibaev (RUS)	Tom Daley and Matty Lee (GBR)
2022 Budapest	Lian Junjie and Yang Hao (CHN)	Matty Lee and Noah Williams (GBR)	Rylan Wiens and Nathan Zsombor-Murray (CAN)
2023 Fukuoka	Lian Junjie and Yang Hao (CHN)	Kirill Boliukh and Oleksiy Sereda (UKR)	Kevin Berlín and Randal Willars (MEX)
2024 Doha	Lian Junjie and Yang Hao (4) (CHN)	Tom Daley and Noah Williams (GBR)	Kirill Boliukh and Oleksiy Sereda (UKR)
2025 Singapore	Cheng Zilong and Zhu Zifeng (CHN)	Nikita Shleikher and Ruslan Ternovoi (NAB)	Joshua Hedberg and Carson Tyler (USA)

Medal table

Rank	Nation	Gold	Silver	Bronze	Total
1	China	12	1	2	15
2	Russia	1	4	2	7
3	Germany	1	2	1	4
4	Australia	1	0	0	1
5	Ukraine	0	2	3	5
6	Great Britain	0	2	2	4
7	Mexico	0	2	1	3
8	United States	0	1	2	3
9	Neutral Athletes B (Note: At the 2025 World Championships, in accordance with sanctions imposed following by the 2022 Russian invasion of Ukraine, athletes from Russia were not permitted to use the name, flag, or anthem of Russia. They instead participated as "Neutral Athletes B (NAB)" and under the World Aquatics flag.)	0	1	0	1
10	Canada	0	0	1	1
10	Cuba	0	0	1	1
Totals (11 entries)		15	15	15	45

== Women ==
Bold numbers in brackets denotes record number of victories in corresponding disciplines.

=== 1 metre springboard ===
Games	Gold	Silver	Bronze
1991 Perth	Gao Min; China	Wendy Lucero; United States	Heidemarie Bártová; Czechoslovakia
1994 Rome	Chen Lixia; China	Tan Shuping; China	Annie Pelletier; Canada
1998 Perth	Irina Lashko; Russia	Vera Ilyina; Russia	Zhang Jing; China
2001 Fukuoka	Blythe Hartley; Canada	Wu Minxia; China	Zhang Jing; China
2003 Barcelona	Irina Lashko (2); Australia	Conny Schmalfuss; Germany	Blythe Hartley; Canada
2005 Montreal	Blythe Hartley (2); Canada	Wu Minxia; China	Heike Fischer; Germany
2007 Melbourne	He Zi; China	Blythe Hartley; Canada	Yuliya Pakhalina; Russia
2009 Rome	Yuliya Pakhalina; Russia	Wu Minxia; China	Wang Han; China
2011 Shanghai	Shi Tingmao; China	Wang Han; China	Tania Cagnotto; Italy
2013 Barcelona	He Zi (2); China	Tania Cagnotto; Italy	Wang Han; China
2015 Kazan	Tania Cagnotto; Italy	Shi Tingmao; China	He Zi; China
2017 Budapest	Maddison Keeney; Australia	Nadezhda Bazhina; Russia	Elena Bertocchi; Italy
2019 Gwangju	Chen Yiwen; China	Sarah Bacon; United States	Kim Su-ji; South Korea
2022 Budapest	Li Yajie; China	Sarah Bacon; United States	Mia Vallée; Canada
2023 Fukuoka	Lin Shan; China	Li Yajie; China	Aranza Vázquez; Mexico
2024 Doha	Alysha Koloi; Australia	Grace Reid; Great Britain	Maha Amer; Egypt
2025 Singapore	Maddison Keeney (2); Australia	Li Yajie; China	Chiara Pellacani; Italy

Medal table

Rank	Nation	Gold	Silver	Bronze	Total
1	China	8	8	5	21
2	Australia	4	0	0	4
3	Russia	2	2	1	5
4	Canada	2	1	3	6
5	Italy	1	1	3	5
6	United States	0	3	0	3
7	Germany	0	1	1	2
8	Great Britain	0	1	0	1
9	Czechoslovakia	0	0	1	1
9	Egypt	0	0	1	1
9	Mexico	0	0	1	1
9	South Korea	0	0	1	1
Totals (12 entries)		17	17	17	51

=== 3 metre springboard ===
Games	Gold	Silver	Bronze
1973 Belgrade	Christa Köhler; East Germany	Ulrika Knape; Sweden	Marina Janicke; East Germany
1975 Cali	Irina Kalinina; Soviet Union	Tetiana Volynkina; Soviet Union	Christine Loock; United States
1978 West Berlin	Irina Kalinina; Soviet Union	Cynthia Potter; United States	Jennifer Chandler; United States
1982 Guayaquil	Megan Neyer; United States	Christina Seufert; United States	Peng Yuanchuan; China
1986 Madrid	Gao Min; China	Li Yihua; China	Marina Babkova; Soviet Union
1991 Perth	Gao Min; China	Irina Lashko; Soviet Union	Brita Baldus; Germany
1994 Rome	Tan Shuping; China	Vera Ilyina; Russia	Claudia Bockner; Germany
1998 Perth	Yuliya Pakhalina; Russia	Guo Jingjing; China	Chantelle Michell; Australia
2001 Fukuoka	Guo Jingjing; China	Irina Lashko; Australia	Yuliya Pakhalina; Russia
2003 Barcelona	Guo Jingjing; China	Yuliya Pakhalina; Russia	Wu Minxia; China
2005 Montreal	Guo Jingjing; China	Wu Minxia; China	Tania Cagnotto; Italy
2007 Melbourne	Guo Jingjing; China	Wu Minxia; China	Tania Cagnotto; Italy
2009 Rome	Guo Jingjing (5); China	Émilie Heymans; Canada	Tania Cagnotto; Italy
2011 Shanghai	Wu Minxia; China	He Zi; China	Jennifer Abel; Canada
2013 Barcelona	He Zi; China	Wang Han; China	Pamela Ware; Canada
2015 Kazan	Shi Tingmao; China	He Zi; China	Tania Cagnotto; Italy
2017 Budapest	Shi Tingmao; China	Wang Han; China	Jennifer Abel; Canada
2019 Gwangju	Shi Tingmao; China	Wang Han; China	Maddison Keeney; Australia
2022 Budapest	Chen Yiwen; China	Mia Vallée; Canada	Chang Yani; China
2023 Fukuoka	Chen Yiwen; China	Chang Yani; China	Pamela Ware; Canada
2024 Doha	Chang Yani; China	Chen Yiwen; China	Kim Su-ji; South Korea
2025 Singapore	Chen Yiwen; China	Chen Jia; China	Chiara Pellacani; Italy

Medal table

Rank	Nation	Gold	Silver	Bronze	Total
1	China	17	12	3	32
2	Soviet Union	2	2	1	5
3	United States	1	2	2	5
4	Russia	1	2	1	4
5	East Germany	1	0	1	2
6	Canada	0	2	4	6
7	Australia	0	1	2	3
8	Sweden	0	1	0	1
9	Italy	0	0	5	5
10	Germany	0	0	2	2
11	South Korea	0	0	1	1
Totals (11 entries)		22	22	22	66

=== 10 metre platform ===
Games	Gold	Silver	Bronze
1973 Belgrade	Ulrika Knape; Sweden	Milena Duchková; Czechoslovakia	Irina Kalinina; Soviet Union
1975 Cali	Janet Ely; United States	Irina Kalinina; Soviet Union	Ulrika Knape; Sweden
1978 West Berlin	Irina Kalinina; Soviet Union	Martina Jäschke; East Germany	Melissa Briley; United States
1982 Guayaquil	Wendy Wyland; United States	Ramona Wenzel; East Germany	Zhou Jihong; China
1986 Madrid	Chen Lin; China	Lü Wei; China	Wendy Wyland; United States
1991 Perth	Fu Mingxia; China	Yelena Miroshina; Soviet Union	Wendy Lian Williams; United States
1994 Rome	Fu Mingxia; China	Chi Bin; China	María José Alcalá; Mexico
1998 Perth	Olena Zhupina; Ukraine	Cai Yuyan; China	Li Chen; China
2001 Fukuoka	Xu Mian; China	Duan Qing; China	Loudy Tourky; Australia
2003 Barcelona	Émilie Heymans; Canada	Lao Lishi; China	Li Na; China
2005 Montreal	Laura Wilkinson; United States	Loudy Tourky; Australia	Jia Tong; China
2007 Melbourne	Wang Xin; China	Chen Ruolin; China	Christin Steuer; Germany
2009 Rome	Paola Espinosa; Mexico	Chen Ruolin; China	Kang Li; China
2011 Shanghai	Chen Ruolin; China	Hu Yadan; China	Paola Espinosa; Mexico
2013 Barcelona	Si Yajie; China	Chen Ruolin; China	Yulia Prokopchuk; Ukraine
2015 Kazan	Kim Kuk-hyang; North Korea	Ren Qian; China	Pandelela Rinong; Malaysia
2017 Budapest	Cheong Jun Hoong; Malaysia	Si Yajie; China	Ren Qian; China
2019 Gwangju	Chen Yuxi; China	Lu Wei; China	Delaney Schnell; United States
2022 Budapest	Chen Yuxi; China	Quan Hongchan; China	Pandelela Rinong; Malaysia
2023 Fukuoka	Chen Yuxi; China	Quan Hongchan; China	Caeli McKay; Canada
2024 Doha	Quan Hongchan; China	Chen Yuxi; China	Andrea Spendolini-Sirieix; Great Britain
2025 Singapore	Chen Yuxi (4); China	Pauline Pfeif; Germany	Xie Peiling; China

Medal table

Rank	Nation	Gold	Silver	Bronze	Total
1	China	12	15	7	34
2	United States	3	0	4	7
3	Soviet Union	1	2	1	4
4	Malaysia	1	0	2	3
4	Mexico	1	0	2	3
6	Canada	1	0	1	2
6	Sweden	1	0	1	2
6	Ukraine	1	0	1	2
9	North Korea	1	0	0	1
10	East Germany	0	2	0	2
11	Australia	0	1	1	2
11	Germany	0	1	1	2
13	Czechoslovakia	0	1	0	1
14	Great Britain	0	0	1	1
Totals (14 entries)		22	22	22	66

=== Synchronized 3 metre springboard ===
Games	Gold	Silver	Bronze
1998 Perth	Irina Lashko and Yuliya Pakhalina (RUS)	Li Rongjuan and Rao Lang (CHN)	Tracy Bonner and Kathy Pesek (USA)
2001 Fukuoka	Guo Jingjing and Wu Minxia (CHN)	Vera Ilyina and Yuliya Pakhalina (RUS)	Ditte Kotzian and Conny Schmalfuss (GER)
2003 Barcelona	Guo Jingjing and Wu Minxia (CHN)	Vera Ilyina and Yuliya Pakhalina (RUS)	Paola Espinosa and Laura Sánchez (MEX)
2005 Montreal	Guo Jingjing and Li Ting (CHN)	Ditte Kotzian and Conny Schmalfuss (GER)	Olena Fedorova and Kristina Ishchenko (UKR)
2007 Melbourne	Guo Jingjing and Wu Minxia (CHN)	Heike Fischer and Ditte Kotzian (GER)	Briony Cole and Sharleen Stratton (AUS)
2009 Rome	Guo Jingjing and Wu Minxia (CHN)	Tania Cagnotto and Francesca Dallapè (ITA)	Yuliya Pakhalina and Anastasia Pozdniakova (RUS)
2011 Shanghai	He Zi and Wu Minxia (CHN)	Jennifer Abel and Émilie Heymans (CAN)	Anabelle Smith and Sharleen Stratton (AUS)
2013 Barcelona	Shi Tingmao and Wu Minxia (CHN)	Tania Cagnotto and Francesca Dallapé (ITA)	Jennifer Abel and Pamela Ware (CAN)
2015 Kazan	Shi Tingmao and Wu Minxia (7) (CHN)	Jennifer Abel and Pamela Ware (CAN)	Samantha Mills and Esther Qin (AUS)
2017 Budapest	Chang Yani and Shi Tingmao (CHN)	Jennifer Abel and Mélissa Citrini-Beaulieu (CAN)	Nadezhda Bazhina and Kristina Ilinykh (RUS)
2019 Gwangju	Shi Tingmao and Wang Han (CHN)	Jennifer Abel and Mélissa Citrini-Beaulieu (CAN)	Paola Espinosa and Melany Hernández (MEX)
2022 Budapest	Chang Yani and Chen Yiwen (CHN)	Rin Kaneto and Sayaka Mikami (JPN)	Maddison Keeney and Anabelle Smith (AUS)
2023 Fukuoka	Chang Yani and Chen Yiwen (CHN)	Yasmin Harper and Scarlett Mew Jensen (GBR)	Elena Bertocchi and Chiara Pellacani (ITA)
2024 Doha	Chang Yani and Chen Yiwen (CHN)	Maddison Keeney and Anabelle Smith (AUS)	Yasmin Harper and Scarlett Mew Jensen (GBR)
2025 Singapore	Chen Jia and Chen Yiwen (CHN)	Yasmin Harper and Scarlett Mew Jensen (GBR)	Lía Cueva and Mía Cueva (MEX)

Medal table

Rank	Nation	Gold	Silver	Bronze	Total
1	China	14	1	0	15
2	Russia	1	2	2	5
3	Canada	0	4	1	5
4	Germany	0	2	1	3
4	Great Britain	0	2	1	3
4	Italy	0	2	1	3
7	Australia	0	1	4	5
8	Japan	0	1	0	1
9	Mexico	0	0	3	3
10	Ukraine	0	0	1	1
10	United States	0	0	1	1
Totals (11 entries)		15	15	15	45

=== Synchronized 10 metre platform ===
Games	Gold	Silver	Bronze
1998 Perth	Svitlana Serbina and Olena Zhupina (UKR)	Cai Yuyan and Li Chen (CHN)	Kristin Link and Lindsay Long (USA)
2001 Fukuoka	Duan Qing and Sang Xue (CHN)	Evgeniya Olshevskaya and Svetlana Timoshinina (RUS)	Takiri Miyazaki and Emi Otsuki (JPN)
2003 Barcelona	Lao Lishi and Li Ting (CHN)	Lynda Dackiw and Loudy Tourky (AUS)	Evgeniya Olshevskaya and Svetlana Timoshinina (RUS)
2005 Montreal	Jia Tong and Yuan Peilin (CHN)	Chantelle Newbery and Loudy Tourky (AUS)	Meaghan Benfeito and Roseline Filion (CAN)
2007 Melbourne	Chen Ruolin and Jia Tong (CHN)	Briony Cole and Melissa Wu (AUS)	Annett Gamm and Nora Subschinski (GER)
2009 Rome	Chen Ruolin and Wang Xin (CHN)	Mary Beth Dunnichay and Haley Ishimatsu (USA)	Leong Mun Yee and Pandelela Rinong (MAS)
2011 Shanghai	Chen Ruolin and Wang Hao (CHN)	Alexandra Croak and Melissa Wu (AUS)	Christin Steuer and Nora Subschinski (GER)
2013 Barcelona	Chen Ruolin and Liu Huixia (CHN)	Meaghan Benfeito and Roseline Filion (CAN)	Leong Mun Yee and Pandelela Rinong (MAS)
2015 Kazan	Chen Ruolin (5) and Liu Huixia (CHN)	Meaghan Benfeito and Roseline Filion (CAN)	Kim Un-hyang and Song Nam-hyang (PRK)
2017 Budapest	Ren Qian and Si Yajie (CHN)	Kim Kuk-hyang and Kim Mi-rae (PRK)	Cheong Jun Hoong and Pandelela Rinong (MAS)
2019 Gwangju	Lu Wei and Zhang Jiaqi (CHN)	Leong Mun Yee and Pandelela Rinong (MAS)	Samantha Bromberg and Katrina Young (USA)
2022 Budapest	Chen Yuxi and Quan Hongchan (CHN)	Delaney Schnell and Katrina Young (USA)	Pandelela Rinong and Nur Dhabitah Sabri (MAS)
2023 Fukuoka	Chen Yuxi and Quan Hongchan (CHN)	Andrea Spendolini-Sirieix and Lois Toulson (GBR)	Jessica Parratto and Delaney Schnell (USA)
2024 Doha	Chen Yuxi and Quan Hongchan (CHN)	Jo Jin-mi and Kim Mi-rae (PRK)	Andrea Spendolini-Sirieix and Lois Toulson (GBR)
2025 Singapore	Chen Yuxi and Zhang Minjie (CHN)	Gabriela Agúndez and Alejandra Estudillo (MEX)	Jo Jin-mi and Kim Mi-hwa (PRK)

Medal table

Rank	Nation	Gold	Silver	Bronze	Total
1	China	14	1	0	15
2	Ukraine	1	0	0	1
3	Australia	0	4	0	4
4	United States	0	2	3	5
5	North Korea	0	2	2	4
6	Canada	0	2	1	3
7	Malaysia	0	1	4	5
8	Great Britain	0	1	1	2
8	Russia	0	1	1	2
10	Mexico	0	1	0	1
11	Germany	0	0	2	2
12	Japan	0	0	1	1
Totals (12 entries)		15	15	15	45

== Mixed ==
Bold numbers in brackets denotes record number of victories in corresponding disciplines.

=== Synchronized 3 metre springboard ===
Games	Gold	Silver	Bronze
2015 Kazan	Wang Han and Yang Hao (CHN)	Jennifer Abel and François Imbeau-Dulac (CAN)	Tania Cagnotto and Maicol Verzotto (ITA)
2017 Budapest	Li Zheng and Wang Han (2) (CHN)	Tom Daley and Grace Reid (GBR)	Jennifer Abel and François Imbeau-Dulac (CAN)
2019 Gwangju	Matthew Carter and Maddison Keeney (AUS)	Jennifer Abel and François Imbeau-Dulac (CAN)	Lou Massenberg and Tina Punzel (GER)
2022 Budapest	Lin Shan and Zhu Zifeng (CHN)	Chiara Pellacani and Matteo Santoro (ITA)	James Heatly and Grace Reid (GBR)
2023 Fukuoka	Lin Shan (2) and Zhu Zifeng (2) (CHN)	Domonic Bedggood and Maddison Keeney (AUS)	Chiara Pellacani and Matteo Santoro (ITA)
2024 Doha	Domonic Bedggood and Maddison Keeney (2) (AUS)	Chiara Pellacani and Matteo Santoro (ITA)	Kim Su-ji and Yi Jae-gyeong (KOR)
2025 Singapore	Chiara Pellacani and Matteo Santoro (ITA)	Maddison Keeney and Cassiel Rousseau (AUS)	Cheng Zilong and Li Yajie (CHN)

Medal table

Rank	Nation	Gold	Silver	Bronze	Total
1	China	4	0	1	5
2	Australia	2	2	0	4
3	Italy	1	2	2	5
4	Canada	0	2	1	3
5	Great Britain	0	1	1	2
6	Germany	0	0	1	1
6	South Korea	0	0	1	1
Totals (7 entries)		7	7	7	21

=== Synchronized 10 metre platform ===
Games	Gold	Silver	Bronze
2015 Kazan	Si Yajie and Tai Xiaohu (CHN)	Meaghan Benfeito and Vincent Riendeau (CAN)	Domonic Bedggood and Melissa Wu (AUS)
2017 Budapest	Lian Junjie and Ren Qian (CHN)	Matty Lee and Lois Toulson (GBR)	Hyon Il-myong and Kim Mi-rae (PRK)
2019 Gwangju	Lian Junjie (2) and Si Yajie (2) (CHN)	Ekaterina Beliaeva and Viktor Minibaev (RUS)	Diego Balleza and María Sánchez (MEX)
2022 Budapest	Duan Yu and Ren Qian (2) (CHN)	Sofiya Lyskun and Oleksiy Sereda (UKR)	Delaney Schnell and Carson Tyler (USA)
2023 Fukuoka	Wang Feilong and Zhang Jiaqi (CHN)	Diego Balleza and Viviana del Ángel (MEX)	Minami Itahashi and Hiroki Ito (JPN)
2024 Doha	Huang Jianjie and Zhang Jiaqi (2) (CHN)	Im Yong-myong and Jo Jin-mi (PRK)	Kevin Berlín and Alejandra Estudillo (MEX)
2025 Singapore	Xie Peiling and Zhu Yongxin (CHN)	Choe Wi-hyon and Jo Jin-mi (PRK)	Aleksandr Bondar and Anna Konanykhina (NAB)

Medal table

Rank	Nation	Gold	Silver	Bronze	Total
1	China	7	0	0	7
2	North Korea	0	2	1	3
3	Mexico	0	1	2	3
4	Canada	0	1	0	1
4	Great Britain	0	1	0	1
4	Russia	0	1	0	1
4	Ukraine	0	1	0	1
8	Australia	0	0	1	1
8	Japan	0	0	1	1
8	Neutral Athletes B	0	0	1	1
8	United States	0	0	1	1
Totals (11 entries)		7	7	7	21

=== Team ===
Games	Gold	Silver	Bronze
2015 Kazan	Great Britain (GBR); Tom Daley; Rebecca Gallantree	Ukraine (UKR); Oleksandr Horshkovozov; Yulia Prokopchuk	China (CHN); Chen Ruolin; Xie Siyi
2017 Budapest	France (FRA); Laura Marino; Matthieu Rosset	Mexico (MEX); Viviana del Ángel; Rommel Pacheco	United States (USA); David Dinsmore; Krysta Palmer
2019 Gwangju	China (CHN); Lin Shan; Yang Jian	Russia (RUS); Sergey Nazin; Yulia Timoshinina	United States (USA); Andrew Capobianco; Katrina Young
2022 Budapest	China (CHN); Bai Yuming; Quan Hongchan	France (FRA); Jade Gillet; Alexis Jandard	Great Britain (GBR); James Heatly; Andrea Spendolini-Sirieix
2023 Fukuoka	China (CHN); Bai Yuming (2); Si Yajie; Zhang Minjie; Zheng Jiuyuan	Mexico (MEX); Gabriela Agúndez; Jahir Ocampo; Aranza Vázquez; Randal Willars	Germany (GER); Timo Barthel; Lena Hentschel; Christina Wassen; Moritz Wesemann
2024 Doha	Great Britain (GBR); Tom Daley (2); Daniel Goodfellow; Scarlett Mew Jensen; Andrea Spendolini-Sirieix	Mexico (MEX); Gabriela Agúndez; Jahir Ocampo; Aranza Vázquez; Randal Willars	Australia (AUS); Nikita Hains; Maddison Keeney; Li Shixin; Cassiel Rousseau
2025 Singapore	China (CHN); Cao Yuan; Chen Yiwen; Chen Yuxi; Cheng Zilong	Mexico (MEX); Alejandra Estudillo; Osmar Olvera; Zyanya Parra; Randal Willars	Japan (JPN); Rin Kaneto; Sayaka Mikami; Reo Nishida; Sho Sakai

Medal table

Rank	Nation	Gold	Silver	Bronze	Total
1	China	4	0	1	5
2	Great Britain	2	0	1	3
3	France	1	1	0	2
4	Mexico	0	4	0	4
5	Russia	0	1	0	1
5	Ukraine	0	1	0	1
7	United States	0	0	2	2
8	Australia	0	0	1	1
8	Germany	0	0	1	1
8	Japan	0	0	1	1
Totals (10 entries)		7	7	7	21

== All-time medal table 1973–2025 ==
Updated after the 2025 World Aquatics Championships.

Rank	Nation	Gold	Silver	Bronze	Total
1	China	138	67	35	240
2	Russia	13	20	17	50
3	United States	13	17	21	51
4	Australia	9	10	13	32
5	Canada	6	15	14	35
6	Great Britain	4	12	14	30
7	Italy	4	8	14	26
8	Mexico	3	14	17	34
9	Soviet Union	3	7	6	16
10	Ukraine	2	7	8	17
11	Germany	1	10	18	29
12	North Korea	1	4	3	8
13	East Germany	1	4	2	7
14	Malaysia	1	1	6	8
15	France	1	1	1	3
15	Sweden	1	1	1	3
17	Netherlands	1	0	0	1
17	Zimbabwe	1	0	0	1
19	Japan	0	2	4	6
20	Cuba	0	1	1	2
20	Czechoslovakia	0	1	1	2
20	Neutral Athletes B	0	1	1	2
23	South Korea	0	0	3	3
24	Egypt	0	0	1	1
24	Finland	0	0	1	1
24	Spain	0	0	1	1
Totals (26 entries)		203	203	203	609

== Multiple medalists ==
Boldface denotes active divers and highest medal count among all divers (including these who not included in these tables) per type.

=== Men ===
Rank	Diver	Country	From	To	Gold	Silver	Bronze	Total
1	**Wang Zongyuan**	China	2019	2025	**9**	–	1	10
2	Qin Kai	China	2007	2015	7	–	–	7
3	**Yang Hao**	China	2015	2024	6	1	2	9
4	**Cao Yuan**	China	2013	2025	5	**5**	1	**11**
5	Dmitri Sautin	Russia	1994	2007	5	1	3	9
6	He Chong	China	2005	2013	5	1	1	7
7	**Lian Junjie**	China	2017	2024	5	1	–	6
8	Greg Louganis	United States	1978	1986	5	–	–	5
9	Tom Daley	Great Britain	2009	2024	4	2	2	8
10	**Xie Siyi**	China	2015	2024	4	2	1	7

=== Women ===
Rank	Diver	Country	From	To	Gold	Silver	Bronze	Total
1	Guo Jingjing	China	1998	2009	**10**	1	–	11
2	**Chen Yiwen**	China	2019	2025	9	1	–	10
2	**Chen Yuxi**	China	2019	2025	9	1	–	10
4	Wu Minxia	China	2001	2015	8	5	1	**14**
5	Shi Tingmao	China	2011	2019	8	1	–	9
6	Chen Ruolin	China	2007	2015	6	3	1	10
7	**Quan Hongchan**	China	2022	2024	5	2	–	7
8	**Chang Yani**	China	2017	2024	5	1	1	7
9	**Si Yajie**	China	2013	2023	5	1	–	6
10	**Maddison Keeney**	Australia	2017	2025	4	3	3	10
