= World Diving Championships =

International diving competition

- Status: active
- Genre: Diving World championship
- Date: varying
- Frequency: biannual
- Country: varying
- Inaugurated: 1973
- Most recent: 2024
- Next event: 2025
- Organiser: FINA
- Website: www.fina.org

The World Diving Championships are a biennial international sports competition organized by FINA since 1973 as part of the FINA World Aquatics Championships.

== Editions ==
Diving start with competitions at the 1973 World Aquatics Championships.

Edition	Country	Events
1973 Belgrade	Yugoslavia	4
1975 Cali	Colombia	4
1978 West Berlin	West Germany	4
1982 Guayaquil	Ecuador	4
1986 Madrid	Spain	4
1991 Perth	Australia	6
1994 Rome	Italy	6
1998 Perth	Australia	10
2001 Fukuoka	Japan	10
2003 Barcelona	Spain	10
2005 Montreal	Canada	10
2007 Melbourne	Australia	10
2009 Rome	Italy	10
2011 Shanghai	China	10
2013 Barcelona	Spain	12
2015 Kazan	Russia	15
2017 Budapest	Hungary	15
2019 Gwangju	South Korea	15
2022 Budapest	Hungary	13
2023 Fukuoka	Japan	15
2024 Doha	Qatar	15
2025 Singapore	Singapore	15

== All-time medal table 1973–2025 ==
Updated after the 2025 World Aquatics Championships.

Rank	Nation	Gold	Silver	Bronze	Total
1	China	138	67	35	240
2	United States	17	20	22	59
3	Australia	14	10	13	37
4	Russia	13	20	18	51
5	Great Britain	7	13	15	35
6	Canada	6	18	16	40
7	Italy	4	8	15	27
8	Mexico	3	17	19	39
9	Soviet Union	3	7	6	16
10	Ukraine	2	7	8	17
11	Germany	1	10	19	30
12	North Korea	1	4	3	8
13	East Germany	1	4	2	7
14	France	1	2	2	5
15	Malaysia	1	1	6	8
16	Romania	1	1	2	4
17	Sweden	1	1	1	3
18	Colombia	1	0	0	1
18	Netherlands	1	0	0	1
18	Zimbabwe	1	0	0	1
21	Japan	0	2	4	6
22	Cuba	0	1	1	2
22	Czechoslovakia	0	1	1	2
22	Neutral Athletes B (Note: At the 2025 World Championships, in accordance with sanctions imposed following by the 2022 Russian invasion of Ukraine, athletes from Russia were not permitted to use the name, flag, or anthem of Russia. They instead participated as "Neutral Athletes B (NAB)" and under the World Aquatics flag.)	0	1	1	2
22	Spain	0	1	1	2
26	Czech Republic	0	1	0	1
27	South Korea	0	0	3	3
28	Belarus	0	0	2	2
29	Egypt	0	0	1	1
29	Finland	0	0	1	1
Totals (30 entries)		217	217	217	651

== See also ==
- FINA Diving Grand Prix
- FINA Diving World Cup
- FINA Diving World Series
- FINA World Aquatics Championships
- FINA World Junior Diving Championships
- List of World Aquatics Championships medalists in diving
