= Italy national diving team =

Italian diving team

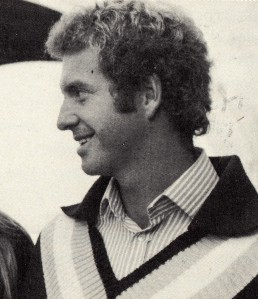
Klaus Dibiasi, three times winner of the Summer Olympics.

The Italy national Diving team represents Italy in International Diving competitions such as Olympic Games or World Diving Championships.

== History ==
The national Italian Diving team participated to all the Summer Olympics editions, from Antwerp 1920, 21 times on 26.

== Medal tables ==
| Event | Editions | 1st edition | Men | | | | Women | | | | Total | | | | Ranking |
|---|---|---|---|---|---|---|---|---|---|---|---|---|---|---|---|
| Event | Editions | 1st edition | Gold medal | Silver medal | Bronze medal | Tot. | Gold medal | Silver medal | Bronze medal | Tot. | Gold medal | Silver medal | Bronze medal | Tot. | Ranking |
| Olympic Games | 21 | 1920 | 3 | 4 | 2 | 9 | 0 | 0 | 0 | 0 | 3 | 4 | 2 | 9 | 6th |
| World Championships | 14 | 1973 | 2 | 2 | 2 | 6 | 0 | 1 | 4 | 5 | 2 | 3 | 6 | 11 | |
| European Championships | 31 | 1926 | 7 | 6 | 13 | 26 | 5 | 4 | 6 | 15 | 12 | 10 | 19 | 41 | |

== Olympic Games ==
| Edition | Gold | Silver | Bronze | Total |
|---|---|---|---|---|
| (Japan) Tokyo 1964 | | 10 metre platform Klaus Dibiasi | | 1 |
| Mexico City 1968 | 10 metre platform Klaus Dibiasi | | | 2 |
| Mexico City 1968 | | 3 metre springboard Klaus Dibiasi | | 2 |
| (West Germany) Munich 1972 | 10 metre platform Klaus Dibiasi | | 10 metre platform Giorgio Cagnotto | 3 |
| (West Germany) Munich 1972 | | 3 metre springboard Giorgio Cagnotto | | 3 |
| (Canada) Montreal 1976 | 10 metre platform Klaus Dibiasi | | | 2 |
| (Canada) Montreal 1976 | | 3 metre springboard Giorgio Cagnotto | | 2 |
| (Soviet Union) Moscow 1980 | | | 3 metre springboard Giorgio Cagnotto | 1 |
| (Brazil) Rio de Janeiro 2016 | | | 3 metre springboard Tania Cagnotto | 2 |
| (Brazil) Rio de Janeiro 2016 | | 3 m springboard synchronized Tania Cagnotto; Francesca Dallapè | | 2 |
| | 3 | 5 | 3 | 11 |

== World Championships ==
Women medals
Mixed medals

| Edition | Gold | Silver | Bronze | Total |
|---|---|---|---|---|
| (Socialist Federal Republic of Yugoslavia) Belgrade 1973 | 10 metre platform Klaus Dibiasi | | | 2 |
| (Socialist Federal Republic of Yugoslavia) Belgrade 1973 | | 3 metre springboard Klaus Dibiasi | | 2 |
| (Colombia) Cali 1975 | 10 metre platform Klaus Dibiasi | | | 2 |
| (Colombia) Cali 1975 | | 3 metre springboard Klaus Dibiasi | | 2 |
| (West Germany) Berlin 1978 | | | 3 metre springboard Giorgio Cagnotto | 1 |
| (Canada) Montreal 2005 | | | 3 metre springboard Tania Cagnotto | 1 |
| (Australia) Melbourne 2007 | | | 3 metre springboard Tania Cagnotto | 2 |
| (Australia) Melbourne 2007 | | | 1 metre springboard Christopher Sacchin | 2 |
| (Italy) Rome 2009 | | 3 m springboard synchronized Tania Cagnotto; Francesca Dallapè | | 2 |
| (Italy) Rome 2009 | | | 3 metre springboard Tania Cagnotto | 2 |
| (China) Shanghai 2011 | | | 1 metre springboard Tania Cagnotto | 1 |
| (Spain) Barcelona 2013 | | 1 metre springboard Tania Cagnotto | | 2 |
| (Spain) Barcelona 2013 | | 3 m springboard synchronized Tania Cagnotto; Francesca Dallapè | | 2 |
| (Russia) Kazan 2015 | 1 metre springboard Tania Cagnotto | | | 3 |
| (Russia) Kazan 2015 | | | 1 metre springboard Tania Cagnotto | 3 |
| (Russia) Kazan 2015 | | | 3 m springboard synchronized Tania Cagnotto; Maicol Verzotto | 3 |
| (Hungary) Budapest 2017 | | | 1 metre springboard Giovanni Tocci | 2 |
| (Hungary) Budapest 2017 | | | 1 metre springboard Elena Bertocchi | 2 |
| | 3 | 5 | 10 | 18 |

== European Championships ==
| Edition | Men | | | Women | | | Total | | | |
|---|---|---|---|---|---|---|---|---|---|---|
| Edition | Gold medal | Silver medal | Bronze medal | Gold medal | Silver medal | Bronze medal | Gold medal | Silver medal | Bronze medal | |
| (Italy) Bologna 1927 | 0 | 0 | 2 | 0 | 0 | 0 | 0 | 0 | 2 | 2 |
| (Netherlands) Utrecht 1966 | 1 | 0 | 1 | 0 | 0 | 0 | 1 | 0 | 1 | 2 |
| (Spain) Barcelona 1970 | 1 | 2 | 1 | 0 | 0 | 0 | 1 | 2 | 1 | 4 |
| (Austria) Vienna 1974 | 2 | 1 | 0 | 0 | 0 | 0 | 2 | 1 | 0 | 3 |
| (Sweden) Jönköping 1977 | 0 | 1 | 0 | 0 | 0 | 0 | 0 | 1 | 0 | 1 |
| (France) Strasbourg 1987 | 0 | 0 | 1 | 0 | 0 | 0 | 0 | 0 | 1 | 1 |
| (Greece) Athens 1991 | 0 | 0 | 1 | 0 | 0 | 0 | 0 | 0 | 1 | 1 |
| (Spain) Sevilla 1997 | 0 | 0 | 1 | 0 | 0 | 0 | 0 | 0 | 1 | 1 |
| (Turkey) Istanbul 1999 | 1 | 0 | 0 | 0 | 0 | 0 | 1 | 0 | 0 | 1 |
| (Germany) Berlin 2002 | 1 | 0 | 1 | 0 | 1 | 1 | 1 | 1 | 2 | 4 |
| (Spain) Madrid 2004 | 1 | 2 | 0 | 1 | 0 | 3 | 2 | 2 | 3 | 7 |
| (Hungary) Budapest 2006 | 0 | 0 | 3 | 0 | 0 | 1 | 0 | 0 | 4 | 4 |
| (Netherlands) Eindhoven 2008 | 0 | 0 | 2 | 1 | 0 | 1 | 1 | 0 | 3 | 4 |
| (Hungary) Budapest 2010 | 0 | 0 | 0 | 2 | 1 | 0 | 2 | 1 | 0 | 3 |
| (Netherlands) Eindhoven 2012 | 0 | 0 | 0 | 1 | 2 | 0 | 1 | 2 | 0 | 3 |
| Total | 7 | 6 | 13 | 5 | 4 | 6 | 12 | 10 | 19 | 41 |

== Multiple medalists ==
| # | Diver | Olympic Games | | | World C'ships | | | Total | | |
| # | Diver | Gold medal | Silver medal | Bronze medal | Gold medal | Silver medal | Bronze medal | Gold medal | Silver medal | Bronze medal |
|---|---|---|---|---|---|---|---|---|---|---|
| 1 | Klaus Dibiasi | 3 | 2 | 0 | 2 | 2 | 0 | 5 | 4 | 0 |
| 2 | Tania Cagnotto | 0 | 1 | 1 | 1 | 3 | 6 | 1 | 4 | 7 |
| 3 | Giorgio Cagnotto | 0 | 2 | 2 | 0 | 0 | 1 | 0 | 2 | 3 |

== See also ==
- Italy at the Olympics
- Diving Summer Olympics medal table
- List of World Aquatics Championships medalists in diving
- Italy national swimming team
