= USA Diving =

National governing body for diving in the U.S.

- Sport: Diving
- Jurisdiction: National
- Affiliation: United States Aquatic Sports
- Headquarters: Indianapolis, Indiana, U.S.
- President: Adam Fox

Official website
- www.teamusa.org/USA-Diving
- (United States)

USA Diving, Inc. is the national governing body of diving in the United States as recognized by the United States Olympic Committee and is a member of United States Aquatic Sports Inc., the United States' member of FINA (the International Swimming Federation).

USA Diving, Inc. is a non profit organization that is headquartered in Indianapolis, Indiana.

USA Diving is responsible for training, selecting and preparing teams that represent the United States at major international events such as the Olympic Games, the World Cup Diving tour and the FINA World Diving Championships.

Events run by USA Diving each year in the United States are the FINA/USA Diving Grand Prix, 12 USA Diving Region Championships, six USA Diving Zone Championships, the USA Diving Senior National Diving Championships and the USA Diving Junior National Championships.

USA Diving provides oversight to 42 Local Diving Associations (LDAs) encompassing more than 300 diving clubs nationwide that provide competitive and training programs collectively referred to as Junior Olympic or JO Diving for divers through High School (age 18 and under). Divers of exceptional talent and ability are selected from the junior program to enter the senior program which identifies and develops top national and international-caliber divers. The masters program is available for divers 21 and over who no longer compete on the senior or junior level, but wish to remain in active competition.

USA Diving also serves as a source of news, educational materials and media for both divers and diving coaches, providing information on all aspects of the sport. The organization's official publication, Inside USA Diving provides continuing information on major programs, events and diving news in quarterly magazine format. Regular features include national and international meet results, general diving articles, competition articles and diver highlights.

== Notable divers ==
- Edgar Adams
- Phil Boggs
- David Boudia
- Jennifer Chandler
- Kassidy Cook
- William Dickey
- Scott Donie
- Justin Dumais
- Troy Dumais
- Mary Beth Dunnichay
- Janet Ely
- Kent Ferguson
- Thomas Finchum
- Leo Goodwin
- Kristian Ipsen
- Haley Ishimatsu
- Bruce Kimball
- Sammy Lee
- Mark Lenzi
- Greg Louganis
- Wendy Lucero
- Kelly McCormick
- Megan Neyer
- Cynthia Potter
- Brittany Viola
- Laura Wilkinson
- Wendy Wyland

== See also ==
- List of Olympic medalists in diving
- List of World Aquatics Championships medalists in diving
- List of 10 meter diving platforms in the United States
- https://www.usadiving.org/
