= Diving at the 1976 Summer Olympics =

Diving at the Games of the XXI Olympiad
- Venue: Montréal Olympic Pool
- Dates: 19 July 1976 through 27 July 1976
- No. of events: 4
- Competitors: 80 from 22 nations

At the 1976 Summer Olympics in Montreal, four diving events were contested during a competition that took place at the Montréal Olympic Pool, from 19 to 27 July (24 July, rest day), comprising 80 divers from 22 nations.

== Medal summary ==
The events are named according to the International Olympic Committee labelling, but they appeared on the official report as "springboard diving" and "platform diving", respectively.

=== Men ===
Event	Gold	Silver	Bronze
3 m springboard	Phil Boggs; United States	Giorgio Cagnotto; Italy	Aleksandr Kosenkov; Soviet Union
10 m platform	Klaus Dibiasi; Italy	Greg Louganis; United States	Vladimir Aleynik; Soviet Union

=== Women ===
Event	Gold	Silver	Bronze
3 m springboard	Jennifer Chandler; United States	Christa Köhler; East Germany	Cynthia Potter; United States
10 m platform	Elena Vaytsekhovskaya; Soviet Union	Ulrika Knape; Sweden	Deborah Wilson; United States

== Medal table ==
Rank	Nation	Gold	Silver	Bronze	Total
1	United States	2	1	2	5
2	Italy	1	1	0	2
3	Soviet Union	1	0	2	3
4	East Germany	0	1	0	1
4	Sweden	0	1	0	1
Totals (5 entries)		4	4	4	12

== Participating nations ==
Here are listed the nations that were represented in the diving events and, in brackets, the number of national competitors.

- Australia (4)
- Austria (3)
- Brazil (1)
- Canada (9)
- Czechoslovakia (1)
- East Germany (7)
- Ecuador (1)
- France (2)
- Great Britain (4)
- Italy (4)
- Japan (3)
- Kuwait (2)
- Mexico (5)
- New Zealand (1)
- Soviet Union (11)
- Spain (3)
- Sweden (3)
- Thailand (1)
- Turkey (1)
- United States (11)
- Venezuela (1)
- West Germany (4)

== See also ==
- Diving at the 1975 Pan American Games
