= Diving at the 1998 World Aquatics Championships =

These are the results of the diving competition at the 1998 World Aquatics Championships, which took place in Perth, Western Australia.

== Medal table ==
Rank	Nation	Gold	Silver	Bronze	Total
1	Russia (RUS)	5	1	2	8
2	China (CHN)	3	6	2	11
3	Ukraine (UKR)	2	0	0	2
4	Germany (GER)	0	2	2	4
5	United States (USA)	0	1	2	3
6	Australia (AUS)	0	0	2	2
Totals (6 entries)		10	10	10	30

== Medal summary ==
=== Men ===
Event	Gold	Silver	Bronze
1 m springboard	Zhuocheng Yu (CHN); 417.54	Troy Dumais (USA); 415.74	Holger Schlepps (GER); 398.31
3 m springboard	Dmitri Sautin (RUS); 746.79	Yilin Zhou (CHN); 694.92	Vassili Lisovski (RUS); 651.60
10 m platform	Dmitri Sautin (RUS); 750.90	Tian Liang (CHN); 699.30	Jan Hempel (GER); 624.15
3 m springboard synchro	Hao Xu (CHN); Zhuocheng Yu (CHN); 313.50	Alexander Mesch (GER); Holger Schlepps (GER); 308.28	Dean Pullar (AUS); Shannon Roy (AUS); 305.16
10 m platform synchro	Tian Liang (CHN); Sun Shuwei (CHN); 326.34	Jan Hempel (GER); Michael Kühne (GER); 308.01	Igor Lukashin (RUS); Aleksandr Varlamov (RUS); 304.02

=== Women ===
Event	Gold	Silver	Bronze
1 m springboard	Irina Lashko (RUS); 296.07	Vera Ilyina (RUS); 288.06	Zhang Jing (CHN); 260.31
3 m springboard	Yuliya Pakhalina (RUS); 544.62	Jingjing Guo (CHN); 518.76	Chantelle Michell (AUS); 515.07
10 m platform	Olena Zhupina (UKR); 550.41	Yuyan Cai (CHN); 536.25	Li Chen (CHN); 519.45
3 m springboard synchro	Irina Lashko (RUS); Yuliya Pakhalina (RUS); 282.30	Lang Rao (CHN); Rongjuan Li (CHN); 276.18	Tracy Bonner (USA); Kathy Pesek (USA); 263.91
10 m platform synchro	Olena Zhupina (UKR); Svitlana Serbina (UKR); 278.28	Yuyan Cai (CHN); Li Chen (CHN); 276.54	Kristin Link (USA); Lindsay Long (USA); 265.47
