= Godziński =

Godziński, feminine: Godzińska is a Polish surname. Notable people with the surname include:

- Roman Godziński (born 1968), Polish diver
- Izabela Godzińska (born 1985) Polish female football player
- Stanisław Godziński (born 1939), Polish Mongolist and Tibetologist
- Zbigniew Godziński (1917–2007), Polish physicist
- George de Godzinsky (1914–1994), Finnish composer, pianist and conductor of Polish ancestry
