= Diving at the 1978 World Aquatics Championships =

These are the results of the diving competition at the 1978 World Aquatics Championships, which took place in West Berlin.

== Medal table ==
Rank	Nation	Gold	Silver	Bronze	Total
1	United States (USA)	2	1	2	5
2	Soviet Union (URS)	2	0	1	3
3	East Germany (GDR)	0	3	0	3
4	Italy (ITA)	0	0	1	1
Totals (4 entries)		4	4	4	12

== Medal summary ==
=== Men ===
Event	Gold	Silver	Bronze
3 m springboard	Phil Boggs (USA); 913.95	Falk Hoffmann (GDR); 873.33	Giorgio Cagnotto (ITA); 845.51
10 m platform	Greg Louganis (USA); 844.11	Falk Hoffmann (GDR); 836.76	Vladimir Aleynik (URS); 813.62

=== Women ===
Event	Gold	Silver	Bronze
3 m springboard	Irina Kalinina (URS); 691.43	Cynthia Potter (USA); 643.22	Jennifer Chandler (USA); 637.41
10 m platform	Irina Kalinina (URS); 412.71	Martina Jäschke (GDR); 384.09	Melissa Briley (USA); 364.74
