= Diving at the 1980 Summer Olympics – Men's 3 metre springboard =

Men's 3 metre springboard at the Games of the XXII Olympiad

Medalists
1st place, gold medalist(s)		Aleksandr Portnov	Soviet Union
2nd place, silver medalist(s)		Carlos Girón	Mexico
3rd place, bronze medalist(s)		Franco Cagnotto	Italy

The men's 3 metre springboard, also reported as springboard diving, was one of four diving events on the Diving at the 1980 Summer Olympics programme.

The competition was split into two phases:

1. Preliminary round (22 July)
  Divers performed eleven dives. The eight divers with the highest scores advanced to the final.
2. Final (23 July)
  Divers performed another set of eleven dives and the score here obtained was combined with half of the preliminary score to determine the final ranking.

== Controversy ==
As Aleksandr Portnov waited to do a 2 and 1/2 reverse somersault in the springboard final, cheers broke out in three adjoining swimming pool during the closing stages of Salnikov's world record breaking 1,500m swim. The diver delayed his start until the noise had subsided but, as he took his first steps along the board, even greater cheers broke out as Salnikov touched in under 15 minutes. Under the rules Portnov, having started, could not stop before take-off. On protest to the Swedish referee G.Olander he was allowed to repeat the dive and went ahead again of Mexico's Carlos Girón. Later protests by Mexico against the re-dive and by East Germany that their Falk Hoffmann wanted to re-dive after allegedly being disturbed by photographic flashlights were both turned down by FINA. FINA President Javier Ostas stated that the decision taken by the Swedish referee was the "correct one”. FINA assessed all the Olympic diving events and considers the judging to have been objective". Portnov remained the winner with Giron taking silver and Cagnotto of Italy bronze.

== Results ==
Rank	Diver	Nation	Preliminary		Final			
Rank	Diver	Nation	Points	Rank	Points	Rank	½ Prel.	Total
1st place, gold medalist(s)	Aleksandr Portnov	Soviet Union	580.11	2	614.970	1	290.050	905.025
2nd place, silver medalist(s)	Carlos Girón	Mexico	580.20	1	602.040	2	290.100	892.140
3rd place, bronze medalist(s)	Franco Cagnotto	Italy	556.32	6	593.340	3	278.160	871.500
4	Falk Hoffmann	East Germany	567.78	3	574.620	5	283.890	858.510
5	Aleksandr Kosenkov	Soviet Union	558.90	4	575.670	4	279.450	855.120
6	Christopher Snode	Great Britain	557.10	5	565.920	6	278.550	844.470
7	Vyacheslav Troshin	Soviet Union	552.42	7	543.840	7	276.210	820.050
8	Ricardo Camacho	Spain	532.02	8	483.330	8	266.010	749.340
9	Frank Taubert	East Germany	524.04	9	did not advance			
10	Dieter Waskow	East Germany	522.87	10	did not advance			
11	Steve Foley	Australia	521.82	11	did not advance			
12	Niki Stajković	Austria	521.04	12	did not advance			
13	Petar Georgiev	Bulgaria	504.33	13	did not advance			
14	Francisco Rueda	Mexico	495.63	14	did not advance			
15	Kenneth Grove	Austria	491.94	15	did not advance			
16	Rolando Ruiz	Cuba	489.24	16	did not advance			
17	Károly Némedi	Hungary	475.17	17	did not advance			
18	Reynaldo Castro	Dominican Republic	469.14	18	did not advance			
19	Roman Godziński	Poland	462.48	19	did not advance			
20	Jorge Mondragón	Mexico	454.17	20	did not advance			
21	Michael Worisch	Austria	452.43	21	did not advance			
22	Milton Machado	Brazil	451.17	22	did not advance			
23	Alex Bagiu	Romania	427.35	23	did not advance			
24	David Parrington	Zimbabwe	416.67	24	did not advance			

== Sources ==
- The Official Report of the Games of the XXIInd Olympiad, Moscow 1980 - Volume 3: Participants and Results (pdf). Moscow: Fizkoultura i Sport Publishers. 1981. pp. p. 488.
