= Diving at the 1973 World Aquatics Championships =

These are the results of the diving competition at the 1973 World Aquatics Championships, which took place in Belgrade.

== Medal table ==
Rank	Nation	Gold	Silver	Bronze	Total
1	United States (USA)	1	1	1	3
2	Italy (ITA)	1	1	0	2
2	Sweden (SWE)	1	1	0	2
4	East Germany (GDR)	1	0	2	3
5	Czechoslovakia (TCH)	0	1	0	1
6	Soviet Union (URS)	0	0	1	1
Totals (6 entries)		4	4	4	12

== Medal summary ==
=== Men ===
Event	Gold	Silver	Bronze
3 m springboard	Phil Boggs (USA); 618.57	Klaus Dibiasi (ITA); 617.73	Keith Russell (USA); 579.48
10 m platform	Klaus Dibiasi (ITA); 559.53	Keith Russell (USA); 523.74	Falk Hoffmann (GDR); 492.15

=== Women ===
Event	Gold	Silver	Bronze
3 m springboard	Christa Köhler (GDR); 442.17	Ulrika Knape (SWE); 434.19	Marina Janicke (GDR); 426.33
10 m platform	Ulrika Knape (SWE); 406.77	Milena Duchková (TCH); 387.18	Irina Kalynina (URS); 381.42
