= Diving at the 2007 World Aquatics Championships =

Diving at the 2009 World Aquatics Championships
- Date(s): 26 – 19 March

The diving competition at the 2007 World Aquatics Championships was held from March 19 to March 26.

== Medal summary ==
=== Medal table ===
* Host nation

* Host nation (Australia)

Rank	Nation	Gold	Silver	Bronze	Total
1	China	9	4	1	14
2	Russia	1	1	2	4
3	Canada	0	3	0	3
4	Germany	0	1	3	4
5	Australia*	0	1	1	2
6	Italy	0	0	2	2
7	United States	0	0	1	1
Totals (7 entries)		10	10	10	30

=== Men ===
Event	Gold		Silver		Bronze	
1 metre springboard	Luo Yutong; China	477.40	He Chong; China	469.85	Christopher Sacchin; Italy	441.40
3 metre springboard	Qin Kai; China	545.35	Alexandre Despatie; Canada	518.65	Dmitri Sautin; Russia	517.10
10 metre platform	Gleb Galperin; Russia	554.70	Zhou Lüxin; China	519.15	Lin Yue; China	513.70
Synchronized; 3 metre springboard	Qin Kai; Wang Feng; China	458.76	Alexandre Despatie; Arturo Miranda; Canada	418.92	Tobias Schellenberg; Andreas Wels; Germany	414.54
Synchronized; 10 metre platform	Huo Liang; Lin Yue; China	489.48	Dmitriy Dobroskok; Gleb Galperin; Russia	467.16	David Boudia; Thomas Finchum; United States	463.56

=== Women ===
Event	Gold		Silver		Bronze	
1 metre springboard	He Zi; China	316.65	Blythe Hartley; Canada	311.20	Yuliya Pakhalina; Russia	304.60
3 metre springboard	Guo Jingjing; China	381.75	Wu Minxia; China	368.80	Tania Cagnotto; Italy	341.70
10 metre platform	Wang Xin; China	432.85	Chen Ruolin; China	410.30	Christin Steuer; Germany	386.85
Synchronized; 3 metre springboard	Wu Minxia; Guo Jingjing; China	355.80	Ditte Kotzian; Heike Fischer; Germany	318.45	Sharleen Stratton; Briony Cole; Australia	313.14
Synchronized; 10 metre platform	Jia Tong; Chen Ruolin; China	361.32	Briony Cole; Melissa Wu; Australia	324.00	Annett Gamm; Nora Subschinski; Germany	306.63
