= Diving at the 1994 World Aquatics Championships =

These are the results of the diving competition at the 1994 World Aquatics Championships, which took place in Rome, Italy.

== Medal table ==
Rank	Nation	Gold	Silver	Bronze	Total
1	China (CHN)	4	4	1	9
2	Russia (RUS)	1	2	1	4
3	Zimbabwe (ZIM)	1	0	0	1
4	Canada (CAN)	0	0	1	1
4	Germany (GER)	0	0	1	1
4	Mexico (MEX)	0	0	1	1
4	United States (USA)	0	0	1	1
Totals (7 entries)		6	6	6	18

== Medal summary ==
=== Men ===
Event	Gold	Silver	Bronze
1 m springboard	Evan Stewart (ZIM); 382.14	Lan Wei (CHN); 375.96	Brian Earley (USA); 361.59
3 m springboard	Yu Zhuocheng (CHN); 655.44	Dmitri Sautin (RUS); 646.59	Wang Tianling (CHN); 638.22
10 m platform	Dmitri Sautin (RUS); 634.71	Sun Shuwei (CHN); 630.03	Vladimir Timoshinin (RUS); 607.32

=== Women ===
Event	Gold	Silver	Bronze
1 m springboard	Chen Lixia (CHN); 279.30	Tan Shuping (CHN); 276.00	Annie Pelletier (CAN); 273.84
3 m springboard	Tan Shuping (CHN); 548.49	Vera Ilyina (RUS); 498.60	Claudia Böckner (GER); 480.15
10 m platform	Fu Mingxia (CHN); 434.04	Chi Bin (CHN); 420.24	María José Alcalá (MEX); 396.48
