= Troy Dumais =

American diver (born 1980)

Personal information
- Full name: Troy Matthew Dumais
- National team: United States
- Born: January 21, 1980 (age 46) Ventura, California, U.S.
- Height: 5 ft 6 in (1.68 m)
- Weight: 160 lb (73 kg)

Sport
- Sport: Diving
- College team: University of Texas
Medal record
Men's diving
Representing the United States
Olympic Games
Bronze medal – third place	2012 London	3 m synchro
World Championships
Silver medal – second place	1998 Perth	1 m springboard
Silver medal – second place	2005 Montreal	3 m springboard
Silver medal – second place	2009 Rome	3 m springboard
Silver medal – second place	2009 Rome	3 m synchro
Bronze medal – third place	2005 Montreal	3 m synchro
Pan American Games
Gold medal – first place	2007 Rio de Janeiro	3 m synchro
Silver medal – second place	2011 Guadalajara	3 m synchro
Bronze medal – third place	1999 Winnipeg	3 m springboard
Bronze medal – third place	2003 Santo Domingo	3 m springboard
Bronze medal – third place	2003 Santo Domingo	3 m synchro
Bronze medal – third place	2007 Rio de Janeiro	3 m springboard

Troy Matthew Dumais (born January 21, 1980) is an American competitive diver from California. Dumais has competed for the United States at four Olympic Games, winning a team bronze medal in the synchronized 3m in 2012. He attended the University of Texas at Austin.

== Life and career ==
Dumais was raised in a family of divers and swimmers, and in 1994 was named Southern Pacific Association Diver of the Year in his class, as were all his siblings.

At the 2000 Summer Olympics, Dumais finished 6th in the men's springboard and 4th in the men's synchronized springboard with David Pichler. Dumais placed 6th in the 2004 Summer Games Men's 3m Synchronized Spring Board with his brother, Justin Dumais. He also placed 6th at the Beijing 2008 Summer Olympics in the Men's 3m Individuals, making that his third 6th-place Olympic finish in a row. With diving teammate Kristian Ipsen, he took the silver medal in the Men's 3m Synchronized Springboard at the 2009 World Aquatics Championships in Rome, Italy, and the bronze medal in the Men's 3m Synchronized Springboard finals at the London 2012 Summer Olympics.

A son of Marc and Kathleen Dumais, Troy Dumais has three brothers and one sister: Justin (born August 13, 1978), Brice (born April 23, 1981), Leanne (born July 2, 1984), Dwight (born June 23, 1986). Marc Dumais was a professional French Canadian hockey player and tennis player. Troy Dumais previously trained under coaches Van Austin, Tom Scotty and Jeff Shaffer. He also played football, hockey, tennis, basketball and baseball.

Dumais was named USA Diving's Athlete of the Year in 2006 and 1997. In 2006, he received the Sullivan Award, and in 2002 was the recipient of the Men's All-Around Award. He was the 2002 NCAA Division I 1-meter and 3-meter champion, who was fifth on platform. He earlier received the 2001 Men's All-Around Award at Indoor Nationals, 2001 NCAA 1-meter and 3-meter champion, 2000 NCAA 3-meter and 1-meter champion, platform silver medalist, and 1999 NCAA 3-meter champion and silver medalist on 1-meter and platform. He earned 19 junior titles, and currently holds the record for most junior titles. In addition, he placed third on platform at the 1996 U.S. Olympic Team Trials. Earlier in 1995, Dumais became the first U.S. junior diver to win two world junior titles since 1979 with gold medals on 1- and 3-meter. While at Buena High School, he was a four-time high school All-American and his team's MVP.

Dumais served as a trainer on the 2013 Fox TV celebrity diving special Stars in Danger: The High Dive.

== US National Championships ==
At the 2011 US National Championships in August, Dumais teamed with Kristian Ipsen to win the synchronized men 3-meter springboard at UCLA's Spieker Aquatics Center.

== 2012 Summer Olympics ==
In June 2012 Dumais gained the second spot representing the United States in the 3m springboard individual event at the London 2012 Summer Olympics the following month. He also, along with his 3m synchro partner Kristian Ipsen, qualified at the same U.S. Olympic Team Trials held in Federal Way, Washington to represent the United States at the games. In making the 2012 United States Olympic team, Dumais equals the record set by Greg Louganis of having been the only diver selected to represent the United States at four Olympiads.

Ipsen and Dumais won the bronze in the synchronized 3m on August 1 with a score of 446.7. The duo's medal along with David Boudia and his partner Nicholas McCrory's bronze in the synchronized 10m platform were the first Olympic medals of any kind in diving for the United States since 2000 and the first for a U.S male diver since 1996 in Atlanta when Mark Lenzi won the bronze medal in the 3 meter springboard.

== See also ==
- List of University of Texas at Austin alumni
