= Diving at the 1991 World Aquatics Championships =

These are the results (the medal winners) of the diving competition at the 1991 World Aquatics Championships, which took place in Perth, Western Australia.

== Medal table ==
Rank	Nation	Gold	Silver	Bronze	Total
1	China (CHN)	4	2	1	7
2	United States (USA)	1	2	1	4
3	Netherlands (NED)	1	0	0	1
4	Soviet Union (URS)	0	2	1	3
5	Germany (GER)	0	0	2	2
6	Czechoslovakia (TCH)	0	0	1	1
Totals (6 entries)		6	6	6	18

== Medal summary ==
=== Men ===
Event	Gold	Silver	Bronze
1 m springboard	Edwin Jongejans (NED); 588.51	Mark Lenzi (USA); 578.22	Wang Yijie (CHN); 577.86
3 m springboard	Kent Ferguson (USA); 650.25	Tan Liangde (CHN); 643.95	Albin Killat (GER); 619.77
10 m platform	Sun Shuwei (CHN); 626.79	Xiong Ni (CHN); 603.81	Georgi Chogovadze (URS); 580.68

=== Women ===
Event	Gold	Silver	Bronze
1 m springboard	Gao Min (CHN); 478.26	Wendy Lucero (USA); 467.82	Heidemarie Bártová (TCH); 449.76
3 m springboard	Gao Min (CHN); 539.01	Irina Lashko (URS); 524.70	Brita Baldus (GER); 503.73
10 m platform	Fu Mingxia (CHN); 426.51	Yelena Miroshina (URS); 402.87	Wendy Lian Williams (USA); 400.23
