= Wu Minxia =

Chinese diver (born 1985)

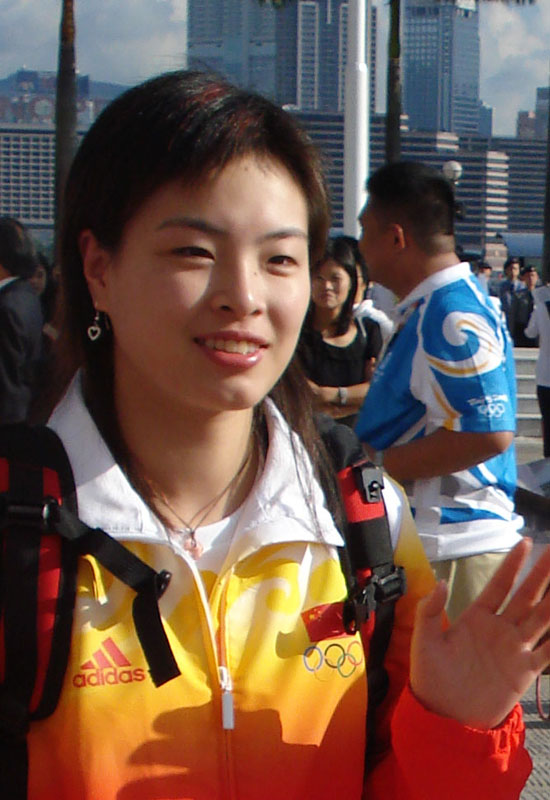
- Wu in 2008

Personal information
- Nationality: Chinese
- Born: 10 November 1985 (age 40) Shanghai, China
- Height: 1.67 m (5 ft 6 in)
- Weight: 53 kg (117 lb)

Sport
- Sport: Diving
- Events: 1 m, 3 m, 3 m synchro
- Partner: Guo Jingjing
- Former partner: Guo Jingjing
- Coached by: Yuan Lianying
Medal record
Event	1st	2nd	3rd
Olympic Games	5	1	1
World Championships	8	5	1
FINA Diving World Cup	7	4	1
Summer Universiade	6	1	0
Asian Games	5	1	–
Total	31	12	3
Olympic Games
Gold medal – first place	2004 Athens	3 m synchro
Gold medal – first place	2008 Beijing	3 m synchro
Gold medal – first place	2012 London	3 m synchro
Gold medal – first place	2012 London	3 m springboard
Gold medal – first place	2016 Rio de Janeiro	3 m synchro
Silver medal – second place	2004 Athens	3 m springboard
Bronze medal – third place	2008 Beijing	3 m springboard
World Championships
Gold medal – first place	2001 Fukuoka	3 m synchro
Gold medal – first place	2003 Barcelona	3 m synchro
Gold medal – first place	2007 Melbourne	3 m synchro
Gold medal – first place	2009 Rome	3 m synchro
Gold medal – first place	2011 Shanghai	3 m synchro
Gold medal – first place	2011 Shanghai	3 m springboard
Gold medal – first place	2013 Barcelona	3 m synchro
Gold medal – first place	2015 Kazan	3 m synchro springboard
Silver medal – second place	2001 Fukuoka	1 m springboard
Silver medal – second place	2005 Montréal	1 m springboard
Silver medal – second place	2005 Montréal	3 m springboard
Silver medal – second place	2007 Melbourne	3 m springboard
Silver medal – second place	2009 Rome	1 m springboard
Bronze medal – third place	2003 Barcelona	3 m springboard
Asian Games
Gold medal – first place	2002 Busan	3 m synchro
Gold medal – first place	2006 Doha	1 m springboard
Gold medal – first place	2006 Doha	3 m springboard
Gold medal – first place	2010 Guangzhou	1 m springboard
Gold medal – first place	2014 Incheon	3 m synchro
Silver medal – second place	2002 Busan	3 m springboard
Summer Universiade
Gold medal – first place	2003 Daegu	Team
Gold medal – first place	2003 Daegu	1m Springboard
Gold medal – first place	2003 Daegu	3m Springboard
Gold medal – first place	2003 Daegu	Synchro Springboard
Gold medal – first place	2005 Izmir	Team
Gold medal – first place	2005 Izmir	1m Springboard
Silver medal – second place	2005 Izmir	3m Springboard

Wu Minxia (Chinese: 吴敏霞; pinyin: Wú Mǐnxiá; born 10 November 1985) is a retired Chinese diver, specializing in the 1 metre and 3 metre springboard, and synchronized 3 metre springboard events. Entering her first major championship in 2001, Wu represented China at every Asian Games, Olympic Games and FINA World Aquatics Championships through 2016. She is an eight-time world champion, and a five-time Olympic and Asian champion, making her one of the most decorated divers in history.

== Career ==
Wu began her competitive career at the 2001 World Aquatics Championships, partnering with Guo Jingjing to win the 3 metre women's synchronized springboard. She would go on to retain the title with Guo on another three occasions, missing out in 2005 when Guo partnered with Li Ting to win in Montreal. Wu also won the same event with Guo at the 2002 Asian Games.

Wu represented China at the 2004 Summer Olympics, earning a gold medal in the 3 metre women's synchronized springboard along with Guo Jingjing before winning a silver medal in the 3 metre women's springboard, coming in second place behind Guo. At the 2008 Summer Olympics, Wu earned a gold medal in the 3 metre women's synchronized springboard along with Guo before winning a bronze medal in the 3 metre women's springboard, coming in third place behind Guo and Russian Julia Pakhalina. After Guo's retirement, she participated in synchronized events with He Zi.

The new partnership allowed her to retain the 3 metre synchro title at the 2011 World Aquatics Championships. It was at the same championships in her hometown where she won her only other world championship title, in the 3 metre springboard. At the 2012 Summer Olympics, Wu earned a gold medal in the 3 metre women's synchronized springboard along with He, becoming the first woman to win gold medal in a diving event in three consecutive Olympic Games. She also won a gold medal in the 3 metre springboard event. After the 3 metre springboard competition, it was revealed that her parents withheld information that her grandmother died a year before, and that her mother had cancer. Her father said he misled her to keep her focused on training. The news drew criticism in China.

By winning the 3m synchronized springboard event at the 2013 and 2015 World Championships with new partner Shi Tingmao, Wu became the first person to win seven gold medals in the event. At the 2014 Asian Games and the 2016 Summer Olympics, Wu earned a gold medal in the 3 metre women's synchronized springboard along with Shi.

== Personal life ==
On 12 May 2017, Wu got engaged to Zhang Xiaocheng. The couple were married on 17 May in Fuping, Shaanxi. Their daughter was born on 19 December 2018, and son was born on 7 February 2022.

== See also ==
- List of multiple Olympic gold medalists

Awards
Preceded by (China) Chen Ruolin	FINA Female Diver of the Year; 2011, 2012	Succeeded by (China) He Zi
