= Diving at the 1975 World Aquatics Championships =

These are the results of the diving competition at the 1975 World Aquatics Championships, which took place in Cali, Colombia.

== Medal table ==
Rank	Nation	Gold	Silver	Bronze	Total
1	United States (USA)	2	0	1	3
2	Soviet Union (URS)	1	3	1	5
3	Italy (ITA)	1	1	0	2
4	Mexico (MEX)	0	0	1	1
4	Sweden (SWE)	0	0	1	1
Totals (5 entries)		4	4	4	12

== Medal summary ==
=== Men ===
Event	Gold	Silver	Bronze
3 m springboard	Phillip Boggs (USA); 597.12	Klaus Dibiasi (ITA); 588.21	Vyacheslav Strakhov (URS); 577.59
10 m platform	Klaus Dibiasi (ITA); 547.98	Nikolay Mikhailin (URS); 532.95	Carlos Girón (MEX); 529.71

=== Women ===
Event	Gold	Silver	Bronze
3 m springboard	Irina Kalinina (URS); 489.81	Tatyana Volynkina (URS); 473.37	Christine Loock (USA); 466.92
10 m platform	Janet Ely (USA); 403.89	Irina Kalinina (URS); 387.99	Ulrika Knape (SWE); 387.90
