= Melissa Briley =

American diver

Personal information
- Nationality: American
- Born: August 25, 1956 (age 69) Houston, Texas, U.S.

Sport
- Sport: Diving
- College team: University of Miami
Medal record
Women's diving
Representing United States
World Championships
Bronze medal – third place	1978 West Berlin	10 m platform

Melissa Briley (born August 25, 1956) is an American diver. She competed in the women's 10 metre platform event at the 1976 Summer Olympics.

== Career ==
Briley was a student at the University of Miami and was the only female member from the university that competed in the 1976 Olympic team as a platform diver. During the Olympic trials in June 1976, she finished second in the 10-meter platform dive to then world champion Janet Ely, having won the National Amateur Athletic Union platform dive earlier in the year.

During a diving meet in Moscow in 1979, Briley broke her right leg when slipping on ice as she was boarding a train. Initially, she was unaware it was broken and traveled for several days before getting it assessed after it swelled. Upon getting her diagnoses, she was unable to compete for several months, instead focusing on weight lifting. She believed it was only because of her accident that she was able to focus on training her diving entry, which needed the most work. She downplayed her injury, suggesting that "it probably was the easiest thing for a diver to overcome." Despite finishing third in the 1979 Pan American Games diving trials and thus missing out on a berth, she did win the women's 10-meter platform competition in the Swimming Hall of Fame pool in May 1980. Her win in May followed another win in Winnipeg, Canada just two weeks prior.

Briley was depicted in the closing credits segment of The Wide World of Sports starting in 1981, lasting for about two years. Other athletes noted during the intro and ending segments were Reynaldo Nehemiah, and others.
