= Megan Neyer =

American springboard diver

Personal information
- Full name: Megan Neyer
- National team: United States
- Born: June 11, 1962 (age 64) Ashland, Kentucky, U.S.

Sport
- Sport: Diving
- Events: Springboard, 1m & 3m Platform, 10m
- College team: University of Florida
Medal record
Women's diving
Representing the United States
World Aquatics Championships
Gold medal – first place	1982 Guayaquil	3 m springboard
Summer Universiade
Silver medal – second place	1981 Bucharest	3 m springboard
Silver medal – second place	1983 Edmonton	3 m springboard
Pan American Games
Silver medal – second place	1987 Indianapolis	3 m springboard

Megan Neyer (born June 11, 1962) is an American former competition springboard and platform diver. Neyer was a member of the ill-fated 1980 U.S. Olympic team, the 1982 world champion springboard diver, a fifteen-time U.S. national diving champion, and an eight-time NCAA champion.

== Early years ==
Neyer was born in Ashland, Kentucky in 1962, but moved to Mission Viejo, California to further her athletic training with the Mission Viejo Nadadores.

== Diving career ==
Neyer won the United States Olympic trials in both springboard and platform diving in 1980, but did not participate in the 1980 Summer Olympics in Moscow because of the American-led boycott arising from the Soviet Union's 1979 invasion of Afghanistan. She was one of 461 athletes to receive a Congressional Gold Medal instead. Neyer accepted an athletic scholarship to attend the University of Florida in Gainesville, Florida, where she competed in National Collegiate Athletic Association (NCAA) competition as a member of coach Randy Reese's Florida Gators swimming and diving team in 1982, 1983, 1984 and 1986. As a freshman in 1982, she was a member of the Gator women's NCAA championship team that included swimmers Theresa Andrews, Amy Caulkins, Tracy Caulkins and Kathy Treible, and won her first two individual NCAA championships in the women's one-meter and three-meter springboard events. In August 1982, four months after her first NCAA championships, Neyer won the gold medal in the women's springboard competition at the World Aquatics Championships in Guayaquil, Ecuador.

Individually, Neyer won a record eight NCAA diving championships, sweeping the one-meter and three-meter springboard events in all four years of college diving, and was recognized as an All-American eight times. In July 1984, she placed third in the U.S. Olympic Trials and failed to make the U.S. Olympic team, which came as a crushing emotional blow to her. After the Olympic trials, she took eighteen months off from competitive diving. She returned to the University of Florida for her senior season in 1986, winning the NCAA championships in the one-meter and three-meter springboard events again. She was also recognized as an Academic All-American in 1983 and 1986, and graduated from Florida with a 3.5 cumulative gradepoint average and a bachelor's degree in psychology in 1986. She remains the all-time winningest collegiate diver, male or female, in NCAA history.

Between 1981 and 1988, Neyer won fifteen national springboard diving championships—eight outdoor events and seven in the indoor events. In 1987, she won the U.S. national championship in the indoor three-meter springboard event and the outdoor one-meter springboard, and the three-meter springboard silver medal in the 1987 Pan American Games. She won her fifteenth and final U.S. national championship in 1988, and retired from competition diving following the 1988 Olympic Trials after failing to qualify for the U.S. Olympic Team.

Neyer was inducted into the University of Florida Athletic Hall of Fame as a "Gator Great" in 1996, and the International Swimming Hall of Fame in 1997. In 2006, she was named the NCAA's Most Outstanding Diver of the Last Quarter Century.

== Life after diving ==
In a June 1988 New York Times article, she openly discussed her private battle with bulimia from 1981 to 1984. After she retired from competitive diving in 1988, Neyer returned to graduate school at the University of Florida on an NCAA post-graduate scholarship to complete her master's degree in sports psychology in 1990 and her doctorate in counseling in 1994. Neyer was honored as a University of Florida Alumna of Outstanding Achievement in 1997, and was formerly the director of performance and wellness counseling at the Homer Rice Center for Sports Performance at Georgia Tech in Atlanta, Georgia. She currently is the principal of Total Performance Systems, Inc., and works as a performance counselor for elite athletes and business executives in Atlanta.

== See also ==
- List of University of Florida alumni
- List of University of Florida Athletic Hall of Fame members
- List of University of Florida Olympians
- List of World Aquatics Championships medalists in diving

== Bibliography ==
- Caraccioli, Jerry, & Tom Caraccioli, Boycott: Stolen Dreams of the 1980 Moscow Olympic Games, New Chapter Press, Washington, D.C. (2009). ISBN 978-0-942257-54-0.
