= Roman Godziński =

Polish diver

Personal information
- Nationality: Polish
- Born: 21 May 1958 (age 66); Warsaw, Poland

Sport
- Sport: Diving

Roman Godziński (born 21 May 1958) is a Polish diver. He competed in the men's 3 metre springboard event at the 1980 Summer Olympics.
