= Lan Wei =

Chinese diver (born 1968)

Personal information
- Native name: 蘭衛
- Born: 7 May 1968 (age 58) Guangzhou, Guangdong, China

Sport
- Country: China
- Sport: Diving
Medal record
Men's diving
Representing China
World Championships
Silver medal – second place	1994 Rome	1 m springboard
Universiade
Gold medal – first place	1991 Sheffield	1 m springboard

Lan Wei (simplified Chinese: 兰卫; traditional Chinese: 蘭衛; pinyin: Lán Wèi; born 7 May 1968) is a Chinese former diver who competed in the 1992 Summer Olympics.
