= Claudia Bockner =

German diver

Personal information
- Nationality: German
- Born: 15 March 1972 (age 54) Gera, East Germany

Sport
- Sport: Diving
Medal record
Women's diving
Representing Germany
World Championships
Bronze medal – third place	1994 Rome	3 m springboard
European Championships
Gold medal – first place	1997 Seville	3 m synchro
Bronze medal – third place	1995 Vienna	3 m springboard

Claudia Bockner (born 15 March 1972) is a German former diver. She competed in the women's 3 metre springboard event at the 1996 Summer Olympics.
