= Wendy Williams (diver) =

American diver (born 1967)

Personal information
- Full name: Wendy Lian Williams
- Born: June 14, 1967 (age 59) St. Louis, Missouri, U.S.
Medal record
Women's diving
Representing the United States
World Diving Cup
| Gold medal – first place | 1989 Indianapolis | 10 m platform |
Olympic Games
| Bronze medal – third place | 1988 Seoul | 10 m platform |
World Aquatics Championships
| Bronze medal – third place | 1991 Perth | 10 m platform |

Wendy Lian Williams (born 14 June 1967) is a retired American diver. She won a bronze medal in the 10 metres platform event at the 1988 Summer Olympics. Additional medals that Williams won include a gold at the 1989 FINA Diving World Cup and a bronze at the 1991 World Aquatics Championships. After ending her diving career in 1992, she worked for NBC as a sports commentator.

== Early life and education ==
Williams was born on 14 June 1967 in St. Louis, Missouri. While spending her childhood in Bridgeton, Missouri, Williams took up trampolining and became a diver before she was three years old. For her post-secondary studies, Williams went to the University of Miami for psychology.

== Career ==
As a college athlete, Williams appeared at the 1985 Summer Universiade. At the 1984 Outdoor Diving Championships, Williams won silver during the 1-meter springboard event. In subsequent events at the Outdoor Championships that year, Williams won gold in the 3-meter springboard and bronze in the platform. In 1988, Williams won the platform event at both the Indoor and Outdoor Diving Championships. At the end of her time at the University of Miami, she won a gold and two bronzes at the 1989 NCAA Division I Women's Swimming and Diving Championships. In international competitions, Williams won gold at the 1989 FINA Diving World Cup and was 5th in the women's 10m platform event at the 1990 Goodwill Games. The following year, she placed in third at the 1991 World Aquatics Championships in the 10m platform.

At the Olympics, Williams won a bronze medal in the platform event at the 1984 United States Olympic Diving Trials but did not qualify for the 1984 Summer Olympics. At the following Olympics, she won another bronze in the 10 meter platform event at the 1988 Summer Olympics. Williams ended her diving career in April 1992 due to injury and became a sports commentator for NBC.

== Awards and honors ==
In 1989, Williams was named the diver of the year in the NCAA. Williams was inducted into the University of Miami Sports Hall of Fame in 2008.

== Personal life ==
In 1996 Williams changed her name to Chaya Grace. In 1999 she married Jamie Champion, and officially became Chaya Grace Champion. Their business, The Vibrancy Path, helps people discover and live in alignment with their soul's purpose.
