= Thomas Finchum =

American diver

Personal information
- Born: December 1, 1989 (age 36) Beech Grove, Indiana, U.S.
- Home town: Indianapolis, Indiana, U.S.
- Height: 6 ft 1 in (1.85 m)
- Weight: 150 lb (68 kg)

Sport
- Country: United States
- Event(s): 10m, 10m synchro
- Club: National Training Center
- Former partner(s): David Boudia; Drew Livingston
- Coached by: John Wingfield
- Retired: June 2012
Medal record
Men's diving
Representing United States
Pan American Games
Gold medal – first place	2007 Rio de Janeiro	10 m synchro
World Championships
Silver medal – second place	2009 Rome	10 m synchro
Bronze medal – third place	2007 Melbourne	10 m synchro

Thomas Finchum (born December 1, 1989) is an American country musician and former platform diver. He was a member of the 2008 U.S. Olympic team. Finchum announced his retirement from diving in 2012. He is now pursuing a country music career.

== Diving career ==
At the 2008 Summer Olympics, Finchum and David Boudia placed fifth in the 10-meter synchronized diving competition. Finchum finished 12th in the individual 10-meter event.

At the 2011 U.S. National Championships, Finchum and Drew Livingston won the 10-meter synchronized men platform title. At the World Championships, he and Boudia were bronze medalists in 2007 and silver medalists in 2009.

== Music career ==
On June 24, 2012, the day after he failed to qualify for the 2012 Summer Olympics, Finchum announced his retirement from competitive diving. He said he would move to Nashville, Tennessee, where he will attend Belmont University and pursue a country music career
