= Kristina Ishchenko =

Ukrainian diver (born 1987)

Personal information
- Full name: Khrystyna Volodymyrivna Ishchenko
- Born: 20 January 1987 (age 39) Mykolaiv, Ukrainian SSR, Soviet Union

Sport
- Country: Ukraine
- Events: 3m, 3m synchro
- Partner: Olena Fedorova
- Retired: yes
Medal record
Women's diving
Representing Ukraine
World Championships
Bronze medal – third place	2005 Montreal	3 m synchro
European Aquatics Championships
Bronze medal – third place	2004 Madrid	3 m synchro
Bronze medal – third place	2006 Budapest	3 m synchro
World Junior Championships
Gold medal – first place	2004 Belém	3 m springboard
Bronze medal – third place	2002 Aachen	3 m springboard
European Junior Diving Championships
Gold medal – first place	2002 Geneva	3 m synchro
Gold medal – first place	2003 Edinburgh	3 m synchro
Gold medal – first place	2004 Aachen	3 m synchro
Silver medal – second place	2002 Geneva	3 m springboard
Silver medal – second place	2004 Aachen	3 m springboard
Bronze medal – third place	2004 Aachen	1 m springboard

Khrystyna Volodymyrivna Ishchenko (Ukrainian: Христина Володимирівна Іщенко; born 20 January 1987), also known as Kristina Ishchenko, is a Ukrainian diver from Mykolaiv.
