= Aleksandr Portnov =

Soviet diver

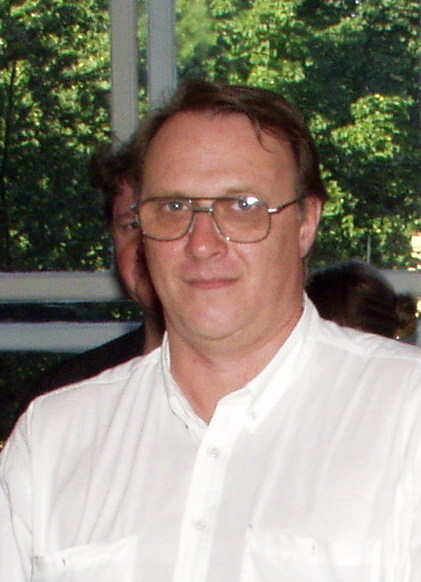

Personal information
- Native name: Александр Сталиевич Портнов
- Full name: Aleksandr Staliyevich Portnov
- Born: 17 September 1961 (age 64)

Sport
- Sport: Diving
- Event: Springboard
Medal record
Men's diving
Representing the Soviet Union
Olympic Games
Gold medal – first place	1980 Moscow	Springboard
World Championships
Bronze medal – third place	1982 Guayaquil	Springboard
European Championships
Gold medal – first place	1981 Split	Springboard
Universiade
Silver medal – second place	1981 Bucharest	Springboard

Aleksandr Staliyevich Portnov (Александр Сталиевич Портнов; born 17 September 1961) is a former Soviet diver and Olympic champion. He competed at the 1980 Olympic Games in Moscow, where he received a gold medal in springboard.
