= Diving at the 1982 World Aquatics Championships =

These are the results of the diving competition at the 1982 World Aquatics Championships, which took place in Guayaquil, Ecuador.

== Medal table ==
| Rank | Nation | Gold | Silver | Bronze | Total |
|---|---|---|---|---|---|
| 1 | United States (USA) | 4 | 1 | 1 | 6 |
| 2 | Soviet Union (URS) | 0 | 2 | 1 | 3 |
| 3 | East Germany (GDR) | 0 | 1 | 0 | 1 |
| 4 | China (CHN) | 0 | 0 | 2 | 2 |
| Totals (4 entries) | | 4 | 4 | 4 | 12 |

== Medal summary ==
=== Men ===
| Event | Gold | Silver | Bronze |
|---|---|---|---|
| 3 m springboard | Greg Louganis (USA); 752.67 | Sergei Kuzmin (URS); 636.15 | Aleksandr Portnov (URS); 631.56 |
| 10 m platform | Greg Louganis (USA); 634.26 | Vladimir Aleynik (URS); 629.85 | Bruce Kimball (USA); 619.68 |

=== Women ===
| Event | Gold | Silver | Bronze |
|---|---|---|---|
| 3 m springboard | Megan Neyer (USA); 501.03 | Christina Seufert (USA); 490.02 | Peng Yuanchuan (CHN); 482.10 |
| 10 m platform | Wendy Wyland (USA); 438.78 | Ramona Wenzel (GDR); 417.99 | Zhou Jihong (CHN); 399.78 |
