= Vera Ilyina =

Russian diver (born 1974)

Personal information
- Born: 20 February 1974 (age 52)
Medal record
Women's diving
Representing Russia
Olympic Games
| Gold medal – first place | 2000 Sydney | 3 m synchro |
| Silver medal – second place | 2004 Athens | 3 m synchro |
World Championships
| Silver medal – second place | 1994 Rome | 3 m springboard |
| Silver medal – second place | 2003 Barcelona | 3 m synchro |
European Championships
Representing the Soviet Union
| Silver medal – second place | 1991 Athens | 3 m springboard |
Representing Russia
| Silver medal – second place | 1993 Sheffield | 3 m springboard |
| Bronze medal – third place | 1993 Sheffield | 1 m springboard |
Representing Russia
| Gold medal – first place | 1995 Vienna | 1 m springboard |
| Gold medal – first place | 1995 Vienna | 3 m springboard |
| Gold medal – first place | 1997 Seville | 1 m springboard |
| Gold medal – first place | 1999 Istanbul | 1 m springboard |
| Gold medal – first place | 1999 Istanbul | 3 m springboard |
| Gold medal – first place | 2000 Helsinki | 1 m springboard |
| Gold medal – first place | 2000 Helsinki | 3 m synchro |
| Gold medal – first place | 2004 Madrid | 3 m synchro |
| Silver medal – second place | 1997 Seville | 3 m springboard |
| Silver medal – second place | 2002 Berlin | 1 m springboard |
| Silver medal – second place | 2002 Berlin | 3 m synchro |
| Silver medal – second place | 2004 Madrid | 3 m springboard |

Vera Sergeyevna Ilyina (Russian: Вера Серге́евна Ильина, born 20 February 1974) is a Russian diver who competed in the 1992 Summer Olympics, 1996 Summer Olympics, 2000 Summer Olympics and 2004 Summer Olympics.

Ilyina is the Olympic champion from Sydney, Australia in 2000 in the 3 m synchronized springboard with partner Yuliya Pakhalina.

Ilyina was born in Moscow.

She currently resides in Houston, United States.
