= Janet Ely =

American Olympic diver

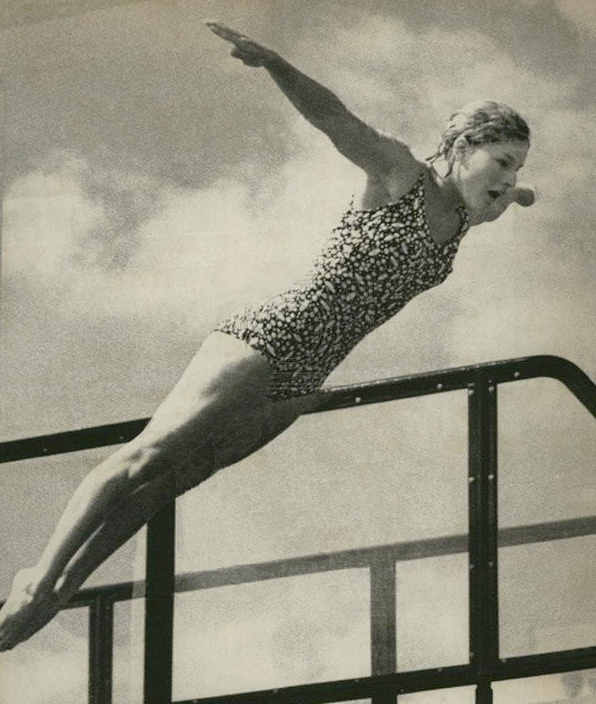
- Ely at the 1972 U.S. Olympic Trials

Personal information
- Born: September 12, 1953 (age 72) Albuquerque, New Mexico, U.S.
- Height: 163 cm (5 ft 4 in)
- Weight: 54 kg (119 lb)

Sport
- Sport: Diving
- College team: University of Michigan; Southern Methodist University
- Club: Bryan Robbins Divers' Club
- Coached by: Dick Kimball (U of M); Jim Stillson (SMU)
Medal record
Representing the United States
World Championships
Gold medal – first place	1975 Cali	10 m platform
Pan American Games
Silver medal – second place	1975 Mexico City	10 m platform

Janet Ely (later Lagourgue and Thorburn, born September 12, 1953) is a former American female diver for the University of Michigan and Southern Methodist University and was a diving competitor in the 1972 Munich and 1976 Montreal Olympics. Under coach Dick Kimball, she trained in swimming and diving at the YMCA Tennis Club, then attended and swam for the University of Michigan and Southern Methodist University.

In 1975, she won the world title in the platform and placed second at the Pan American Games. Domestically Ely held the AAU platform titles in 1972 and 1975.

== Early life ==
Ely was born in Albuquerque, New Mexico, where she attended Sandia Preparatory School. She left Albuquerque in 10th grade to live with her coach Dick Kimball, where she learned to swim and dive at the YMCA Tennis Club. She was introduced to her coach by "a little Japanese lady", who invited Ely to join her at a swimming camp in Florida and after a two-week stay, she was invited by Kimball to train with him for a year.

She attended the University of Michigan in 1972, later graduating from Southern Methodist University. At SMU she competed for the dive team from 1978-1980, and was coached by Jim Stillson, a former All American diver at Ohio State who had served as the dive coach at Columbia University. Ely later coached divers at the Mission Viejo Nadadores Swim Club, an outstanding age group team.

== Career ==
In April 1971, Ely competed in the Hall of Fame International Diving Championships, where she surprised spectators in her performance by outscoring Czechoslovakia's 1968 Summer Olympics gold-medalist Milena Duchková in the 10-meter platform event, with a score of 366.75 to 356.80.

=== 1972 Olympics ===
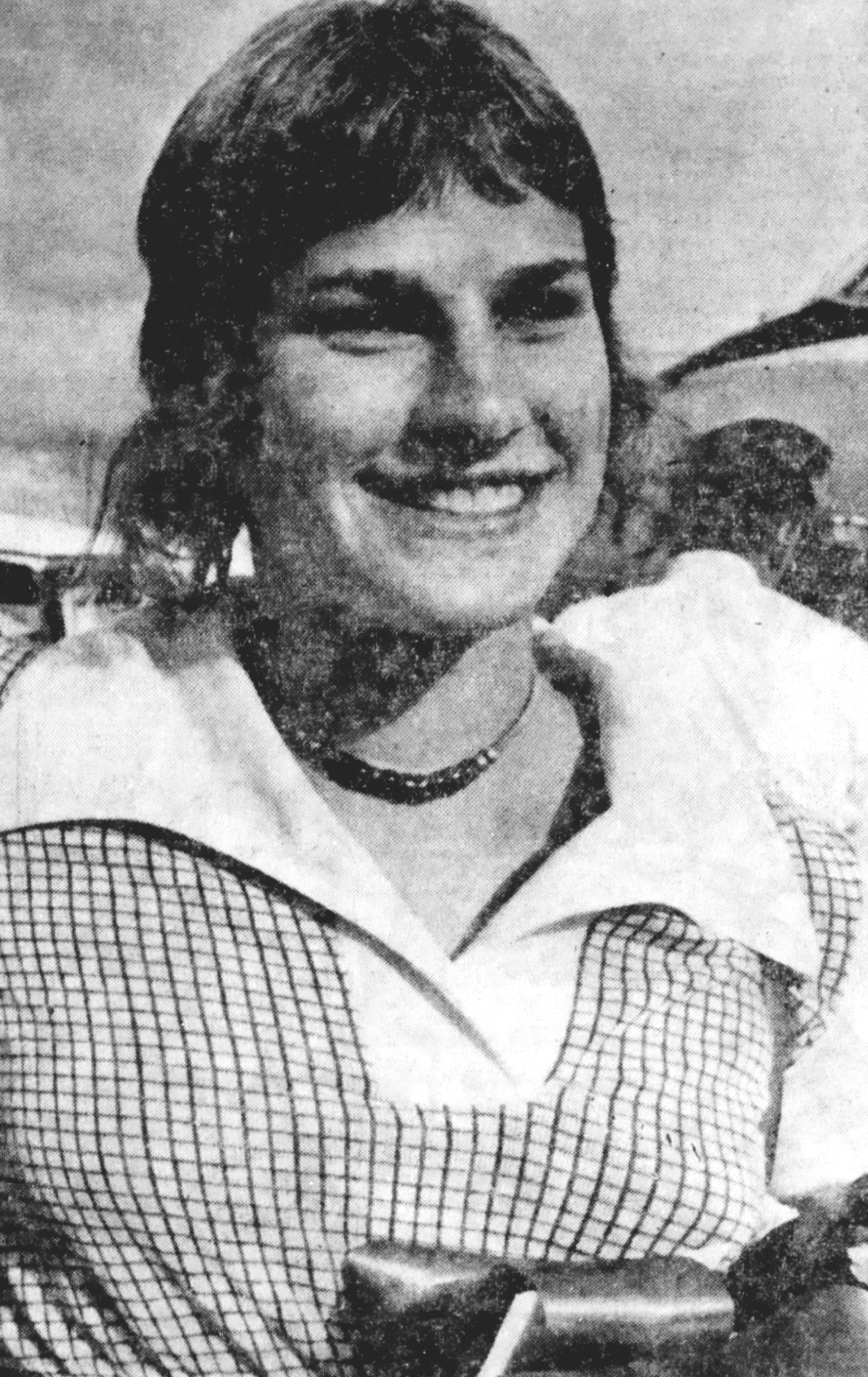
Ely in 1972

Ely competed in the 1972 Summer Olympics diving events, having won the 10-meter event during the United States Olympic trials in July, to secure her place on the diving team along with Cindy Potter and Micki King. Upon initially arriving, Ely noted that she "had a really good feeling" and made friends with others on the U.S diving team, with an open atmosphere in the period before the competition began. Less than an hour before she was scheduled to start her dives, her team coach was advised that unless Ely submitted to an immediate femininity test, she would be disqualified. Ely recalled the experience as being "really frightening" as "they were all talking German and laughing". Despite initially feeling optimistic, Ely finished 4th in both the 3-meter springboard and 10-meter platform diving events. Although missing out on a medal, she "really enjoyed it over-all" but was critical about the politics of the event, suggesting that competition between countries appeared to be more important than between athletes. The experience left her disillusioned and unsure if she would compete at the next Olympics in 1976. During the event, Ely was struggling with back problems which she had corrected shortly afterwards in Puerto Rico.

=== 1975 Worlds, and Pan American ===
During the 1975 World Aquatics Championships, she won a gold medal in the women's 10m platform and later in the 1975 Pan American Games, won a silver medal in the women's 10m platform event. Ely's silver-medal finish was considered an upset, as she was expected to win gold on the basis of being the 10-meter platform world champion, but ultimately congratulated Canada's Janet Nutter on her victory.

=== 1976 Olympics ===
In June 1976, she secured her position on the 1976 Summer Olympics team after "eight spectacular dives", in the trials scoring 438.96 points with no single dive being scored less than 8/10 by judges. At the 1976 Montreal Olympics, she finished 9th competing in the 10m platform event, just missing the final round.

== Personal life ==
Ely was married twice. In November 1978, she married John Thorburn in Dallas, Texas. Her father was D. Maxwell Ellett and she has two brothers, of which one, Teddy, is a twin.
