= Aleksandr Varlamov (diver) =

Russian Olympic diver

Personal information
- Full name: Aleksandr Viktorovich Varlamov
- Born: July 18, 1979 (age 46) Voronezh, Russian SFSR, Soviet Union
Medal record
Men's diving
Representing Russia
World Championships
Bronze medal – third place	1998 Perth	10 m synchro
European Championships
Silver medal – second place	1997 Seville	10 m synchro
Silver medal – second place	2008 Eindhoven	10 m synchro
Bronze medal – third place	2002 Berlin	10 m platform
Bronze medal – third place	2002 Berlin	10 m synchro

Aleksandr Viktorovich Varlamov (Russian: Александр Викторович Варламов; born July 18, 1979) is a Russian diver who, along with Igor Lukashin, won the bronze medal at the 1998 World Aquatics Championships in the men's 10 m platform synchronized event. He represented Belarus at the 2004 Summer Olympics in Athens, Greece.
