= Mark Lenzi =

American diver and coach

Personal information
- Born: July 4, 1968 Huntsville, Alabama
- Died: April 9, 2012 (aged 43) Greenville, North Carolina
Medal record
Men's diving
Representing the United States
Olympic Games
Gold medal – first place	1992 Barcelona	3 m springboard
Bronze medal – third place	1996 Atlanta	3 m springboard
World Aquatics Championships
Silver medal – second place	1991 Perth	1 m springboard
Pan American Games
Gold medal – first place	1991 Havana	1 m springboard

Mark Edward Lenzi (July 4, 1968 – April 9, 2012) was an American Olympic diver and diving coach. Lenzi was known for his Olympic gold medal in the 1992 Olympic Games, and his Olympic bronze medal in the 1996 Olympic Games on the 3 m springboard.

Lenzi was also the first American diver to perform a 109C (forward 4.5 somersault tuck) in competition, and the first diver to score over 100 points in competition, performing a 307C (reverse 3.5 somersault tuck) off of the 3 m springboard for over 102 points.

== Diving career ==
Inspired by seeing Greg Louganis earn a gold medal at the 1984 Los Angeles Olympics, Lenzi quit wrestling at age 16 and took up diving.

Lenzi began his collegiate diving career with the Indiana University Hoosiers in 1986. Lenzi, under the coaching of Hobie Billingsley, won two NCAA Championships in the 1-meter in 1989 and 1990. He was named NCAA Diver of the Year both seasons and added five Big Ten titles to those awards. Of his time at Indiana he said:

My time at Indiana is very special to me. I have so many wonderful memories! It is difficult to pick one instance that stands out more than any other. Wearing the cream and crimson, as well as the stars and stripes, made me very proud. I loved competing for Indiana and the United States. If I had to pick a moment that really stands out for me then it would be one that was very recent. Being inducted into the Indiana Hall of Fame a few years ago was one of my proudest moments. I dreamed about it when I first arrived on campus and saw all of the legends in Assembly Hall. Little did I know that one day I would have the honor of being included with this very prestigious group. I was so overcome with emotion at the ceremony that I almost broke down.

After making the U.S. National team in 1989 at age 21, Lenzi graduated from Indiana University and began diving under coach Dick Kimball. In 1991 and 1992, Lenzi was recognized as the "Phillips 66 Diver of the Year." Lenzi represented the U.S. at the 1992 Olympics in Barcelona, where he won the gold medal by 31 points over Tan Liangde and Dmitri Sautin.

After briefly retiring from diving shortly after the Olympics, Lenzi returned to the sport in late 1995. Lenzi qualified for the 1996 Olympic team on the 3m springboard despite an injured shoulder, and won a bronze medal behind Xiong Ni and Yu Zhuocheng.

In total, Lenzi won 18 international competitions at the 1m and 3m springboard level. He also became the first American diver to perform a 109C in competition, and the first diver to score over 100 points on a single dive in competition. Lenzi returned to Indiana University briefly in the 2000s as an administrative assistant to the swimming and diving program. For the two years prior to his death, Lenzi served as diving coach for the men's and women's teams at East Carolina University.

== Personal life ==
Mark Lenzi was the son of Ellie and Bill Lenzi and raised in Fredericksburg, Virginia with his three siblings. His decision in high school to switch from wrestling to diving created strife between father and son at first, causing Lenzi to move out of the home for a brief period. However the elder Lenzi became a strong supporter and was even in attendance at the 1992 Barcelona Olympics. After retiring, Lenzi and his wife Dorothy settled in Greenville, North Carolina.

== Illness and death ==
On March 28, 2012, Lenzi suffered fainting spells, and was taken to Vidant Medical Center in Greenville, North Carolina, where his blood pressure fell to 78/48; normal being 120/80. According to his mother, Lenzi had been taking medication for a heart ailment. He died on April 9, 2012.

== See also ==
- List of members of the International Swimming Hall of Fame
