= Diving at the 2005 World Aquatics Championships =

- Date: 17 – 24 July

The diving competition at the 2005 World Aquatics Championships took place in Montreal, Quebec, Canada from July 17 to July 24.

== Medal table ==
Rank	Nation	Gold	Silver	Bronze	Total
1	China (CHN)	5	4	3	12
2	Canada (CAN)	3	0	1	4
3	United States (USA)	1	1	1	3
4	Russia (RUS)	1	0	1	2
5	Germany (GER)	0	2	1	3
6	Australia (AUS)	0	2	0	2
7	Cuba (CUB)	0	1	0	1
8	Great Britain (GBR)	0	0	1	1
8	Italy (ITA)	0	0	1	1
8	Ukraine (UKR)	0	0	1	1
Totals (10 entries)		10	10	10	30

== Medal winners ==
=== Men ===
Event	Gold	Silver	Bronze
1 m springboard	(Canada) Alexandre Despatie; 489.69	(China) Xu Xiang; 445.68	(China) Wang Feng; 445.56
3 m springboard	(Canada) Alexandre Despatie; 813.60 WR	(United States) Troy Dumais; 752.76	(China) He Chong; 730.77
10 m platform	(China) Hu Jia; 698.01	(Cuba) José Guerra; 691.14	(Russia) Gleb Galperin; 656.19
3 m springboard synchro	(China) He Chong (China) Wang Feng; 384.42	(Germany) Tobias Schellenberg (Germany) Andreas Wels; 364.59	(United States) Justin Dumais (United States) Troy Dumais; 360.27
10 m platform synchro	(Russia) Dmitry Dobroskok (Russia) Gleb Galperin; 392.88	(China) Yang Jinghui (China) Hu Jia; 374.79	(United Kingdom) Peter Waterfield (United Kingdom) Leon Taylor; 367.95

=== Women ===
Event	Gold	Silver	Bronze
1 m springboard	Blythe Hartley (CAN); 325.65	Wu Minxia (CHN); 299.70	Heike Fischer (GER); 299.46
3 m springboard	Guo Jingjing (CHN); 645.54	Wu Minxia (CHN); 619.05	Tania Cagnotto (ITA); 591.27
10 m platform	Laura Ann Wilkinson (USA); 564.87	Loudy Tourky (AUS); 551.25	Jia Tong (CHN); 550.98
3 m springboard synchro	Li Ting (CHN); Guo Jingjing (CHN); 349.80	Ditte Kotzian (GER); Conny Schmalfuss (GER); 319.05	Olena Fedorova (UKR); Kristina Ishchenko (UKR); 308.82
10 m platform synchro	Jia Tong (CHN); Yuan Peilin (CHN); 351.60	Chantelle Newbery (AUS); Loudy Tourky (AUS); 334.89	Meaghan Benfeito (CAN); Roseline Filion (CAN); 328.80

== Notable events ==
- Alexandre Despatie (Canada) broke the 800-point barrier scoring 813.60 points in the men's 3-meter springboard event, winning gold, and the world record. He becomes the first diver to win gold in all three disciplines of diving (1 m, 3 m, 10 m), two of them in 2005, one in 2003. He held all men's three titles simultaneously for a short time, as he did not compete in the 10 m event in Montreal, due to injury suffered in training.
- Chelsea Davis (United States), 17, smacks her face against the end of the springboard, in a dive gone awry, landing hard in the water. She leaves the blood-filled water conscious but with blood pouring from her nose, after failing in an inward 2½ somersault on the women's 3 m springboard, during the morning preliminary round. She was found to have no major injuries, just requiring 3 stitches.
