= Yu Zhuocheng =

Chinese diver

Personal information
- Born: December 7, 1975 (age 50) Guangdong, China
- Height: 5 ft 4.5 in (164 cm)

Sport
- Country: People's Republic of China
- Event: 3m springboard
Medal record
Men's diving
Representing China
Olympic Games
Silver medal – second place	1996 Atlanta	3 m springboard
Asian Games
Silver medal – second place	1994 Hiroshima	3 m springboard
Silver medal – second place	1998 Bangkok	3 m springboard
World Championships
Gold medal – first place	1994 Rome	3 m springboard
Gold medal – first place	1998 Perth	1 m springboard
Gold medal – first place	1998 Perth	3 m springboard synchro

Yu Zhuocheng (Chinese: 余卓成; born December 7, 1975, in Guangdong) is a male diver from PR China. Yu won a silver medal in the 3 metre springboard diving at the 1996 Summer Olympic Games.
