= Diving at the 2011 World Aquatics Championships =

- Host city: Shanghai, China
- Date: 16 – 24 July
- Venue: Shanghai Oriental Sports Center

The diving competition at the 2011 World Aquatics Championships was held between July 16–24, 2011 at the Shanghai Oriental Sports Center in Shanghai, China. Chinese divers dominated, winning all 10 gold medals.

== Events ==
The following events were contested by both men and women in Shanghai:

- 1 m springboard
- 3 m springboard
- 10 m platform
- 3 m springboard synchronized
- 10 m platform synchronized

Individual events consisted of preliminaries, semifinals and finals. The order of divers in the preliminary round were determined by computerized random selection, during the technical meeting. The 18 divers with the highest scores in the preliminaries proceeded to the semifinals.

The semifinal consisted of the top 18 ranked divers from the preliminary competition and the final consisted of the top 12 ranked divers from the semifinal.

== Schedule ==
| Date | Time | Round |
|---|---|---|
| 16 July 2011 | 10:00 | Women's synchronized 3 metre springboard preliminaries |
| 16 July 2011 | 13:00 | Men's 1 metre springboard preliminaries |
| 16 July 2011 | 17:15 | Women's synchronized 3 metre springboard final |
| 17 July 2011 | 10:00 | Men's synchronized 10 metre platform preliminaries |
| 17 July 2011 | 13:00 | Women's 1 metre springboard preliminaries |
| 17 July 2011 | 17:05 | Men's synchronized 10 metre platform final |
| 18 July 2011 | 10:00 | Women's synchronized 10 metre platform preliminaries |
| 18 July 2011 | 14:00 | Men's 1 metre springboard final |
| 18 July 2011 | 17:15 | Women's synchronized 10 metre platform final |
| 19 July 2011 | 10:00 | Men's synchronized 3 metre springboard preliminaries |
| 19 July 2011 | 14:00 | Women's 1 metre springboard final |
| 19 July 2011 | 17:05 | Men's synchronized 3 metre springboard final |
| 20 July 2011 | 10:00 | Women's 10 metre platform preliminaries |
| 20 July 2011 | 14:00 | Women's 10 metre platform semifinal |
| 21 July 2011 | 09:00 | Men's 3 metre springboard preliminaries |
| 21 July 2011 | 14:00 | Men's 3 metre springboard semifinal |
| 21 July 2011 | 17:15 | Women's 10 metre platform final |
| 22 July 2011 | 10:00 | Women's 3 metre springboard preliminaries |
| 22 July 2011 | 14:00 | Women's 3 metre springboard semifinal |
| 22 July 2011 | 17:05 | Men's 3 metre springboard final |
| 23 July 2011 | 10:00 | Men's 10 metre platform preliminaries |
| 23 July 2011 | 14:00 | Men's 10 metre platform semifinal |
| 23 July 2011 | 17:05 | Women's 3 metre springboard final |
| 24 July 2011 | 16:05 | Men's 10 metre platform final |

== Medal table ==
* Host nation (China)

| Rank | Nation | Gold | Silver | Bronze | Total |
|---|---|---|---|---|---|
| 1 | China* | 10 | 4 | 0 | 14 |
| 2 | Russia | 0 | 2 | 1 | 3 |
| 3 | Germany | 0 | 1 | 3 | 4 |
| 4 | Australia | 0 | 1 | 1 | 2 |
| 4 | Canada | 0 | 1 | 1 | 2 |
| 6 | United States | 0 | 1 | 0 | 1 |
| 7 | Mexico | 0 | 0 | 2 | 2 |
| 8 | Italy | 0 | 0 | 1 | 1 |
| 8 | Ukraine | 0 | 0 | 1 | 1 |
| Totals (9 entries) | | 10 | 10 | 10 | 30 |

- Record(*)

== Medal summary ==
=== Men ===
| Event | Gold | | Silver | | Bronze | |
|---|---|---|---|---|---|---|
| 1 metre springboard | Li Shixin (CHN) | 463.90 | He Min (CHN) | 444.00 | Pavlo Rozenberg (GER) | 436.50 |
| 3 metre springboard | He Chong (CHN) | 554.30 | Ilya Zakharov (RUS) | 508.95 | Evgeny Kuznetsov (RUS) | 493.55 |
| 10 metre platform | Qiu Bo (CHN) | 585.45 | David Boudia (USA) | 544.25 | Sascha Klein (GER) | 534.50 |
| Synchronized; 3 metre springboard | Qin Kai (CHN); Luo Yutong (CHN) | 463.98 | Ilya Zakharov (RUS); Evgeny Kuznetsov (RUS) | 451.89 | Yahel Castillo (MEX); Julián Sánchez (MEX) | 437.61 |
| Synchronized; 10 metre platform | Qiu Bo (CHN); Huo Liang (CHN) | 480.03 | Patrick Hausding (GER); Sascha Klein (GER) | 443.01 | Oleksandr Gorshkovozov (UKR); Oleksandr Bondar (UKR) | 435.36 |

=== Women ===
| Event | Gold | | Silver | | Bronze | |
|---|---|---|---|---|---|---|
| 1 metre springboard | Shi Tingmao (CHN) | 318.65 | Wang Han (CHN) | 310.20 | Tania Cagnotto (ITA) | 295.45 |
| 3 metre springboard | Wu Minxia (CHN) | 380.85 | He Zi (CHN) | 379.15 | Jennifer Abel (CAN) | 365.10 |
| 10 metre platform | Chen Ruolin (CHN) | 405.30 | Hu Yadan (CHN) | 394.00 | Paola Espinosa (MEX) | 377.15 |
| Synchronized; 3 metre springboard | Wu Minxia (CHN); He Zi (CHN) | 356.40 | Émilie Heymans (CAN); Jennifer Abel (CAN) | 313.50 | Anabelle Smith (AUS); Sharleen Stratton (AUS) | 306.90 |
| Synchronized; 10 metre platform | Wang Hao (CHN); Chen Ruolin (CHN) | 362.58 | Alexandra Croak (AUS); Melissa Wu (AUS) | 325.92 | Christin Steuer (GER); Nora Subschinski (GER) | 316.29 |
