= Diving at the 2009 World Aquatics Championships =

- Date(s): 25 – 17 July

The diving competition at the 2009 World Aquatics Championships were held from July 17 to July 25. This diving competition complements the 2010 FINA Diving World Cup.

== Medal table ==
| Rank | Nation | Gold | Silver | Bronze | Total |
|---|---|---|---|---|---|
| 1 | China (CHN) | 7 | 4 | 3 | 14 |
| 2 | Russia (RUS) | 1 | 0 | 1 | 2 |
| 3 | Great Britain (GBR) | 1 | 0 | 0 | 1 |
| 3 | Mexico (MEX) | 1 | 0 | 0 | 1 |
| 5 | United States (USA) | 0 | 4 | 0 | 4 |
| 6 | Canada (CAN) | 0 | 1 | 2 | 3 |
| 7 | Italy (ITA) | 0 | 1 | 1 | 2 |
| 8 | Australia (AUS) | 0 | 0 | 1 | 1 |
| 8 | Cuba (CUB) | 0 | 0 | 1 | 1 |
| 8 | Malaysia (MAS) | 0 | 0 | 1 | 1 |
| Totals (10 entries) | | 10 | 10 | 10 | 30 |

- Record(*)

== Medal summary ==
=== Men ===
| Event | Gold | Silver | Bronze |
|---|---|---|---|
| 1 metre springboard | Qin Kai (CHN) | Zhang Xinhua (CHN) | Matthew Mitcham (AUS) |
| 3 metre springboard | He Chong (CHN) | Troy Dumais (USA) | Alexandre Despatie (CAN) |
| 10 metre platform | Tom Daley (GBR) | Qiu Bo (CHN) | Zhou Lüxin (CHN) |
| Synchronized; 3 metre springboard | Qin Kai (CHN); Wang Feng (CHN) | Troy Dumais (USA); Kristian Ipsen (USA) | Alexandre Despatie (CAN); Reuben Ross (CAN) |
| Synchronized; 10 metre platform | Huo Liang (CHN); Lin Yue (CHN) | David Boudia (USA); Thomas Finchum (USA) | José Guerra (CUB); Jeinkler Aguirre (CUB) |

=== Women ===
| Event | Gold | Silver | Bronze |
|---|---|---|---|
| 1 metre springboard | Yuliya Pakhalina (RUS) | Wu Minxia (CHN) | Wang Han (CHN) |
| 3 metre springboard | Guo Jingjing (CHN) | Émilie Heymans (CAN) | Tania Cagnotto (ITA) |
| 10 metre platform | Paola Espinosa (MEX) | Chen Ruolin (CHN) | Kang Li (CHN) |
| Synchronized; 3 metre springboard | Guo Jingjing (CHN); Wu Minxia (CHN) | Tania Cagnotto (ITA); Francesca Dallapè (ITA) | Julia Pakhalina (RUS); Anastasia Pozdniakova (RUS) |
| Synchronized; 10 metre platform | Chen Ruolin (CHN); Wang Xin (CHN) | Haley Ishimatsu (USA); Mary Beth Dunnichay (USA) | Pandelela Rinong Pamg (MAS); Leong Mun Yee (MAS) |
