= Yuliya Pakhalina =

Russian diver (born 1977)

Personal information
- Full name: Yuliya Vladimirovna Pakhalina
- Born: 12 September 1977 (age 48) Penza, Russian SFSR, Soviet Union
- Height: 155 cm (5 ft 1 in)

Sport
- Country: Russia
- Event(s): 3m, 3m synchro
- Partner: Anastasia Pozdniakova
- Former partner: Vera Ilyina
- Coached by: Jane Figueiredo
Medal record
Women's diving
Representing Russia
Olympic Games
Gold medal – first place	2000 Sydney	3 m synchro
Silver medal – second place	2004 Athens	3 m synchro
Silver medal – second place	2008 Beijing	3 m springboard
Silver medal – second place	2008 Beijing	3 m synchro
Bronze medal – third place	2004 Athens	3 m springboard
World Championships
Gold medal – first place	1998 Perth	3 m springboard
Gold medal – first place	1998 Perth	3 m synchro
Gold medal – first place	2009 Rome	1 m springboard
Silver medal – second place	2001 Fukuoka	3 m synchro
Silver medal – second place	2003 Barcelona	3 m springboard
Silver medal – second place	2003 Barcelona	3 m synchro
Bronze medal – third place	2001 Fukuoka	3 m springboard
Bronze medal – third place	2009 Rome	3 m synchro
European Championships
Gold medal – first place	1997 Seville	3 m springboard
Gold medal – first place	2000 Helsinki	3 m springboard
Gold medal – first place	2000 Helsinki	3 m synchro
Gold medal – first place	2002 Berlin	3 m springboard
Gold medal – first place	2004 Madrid	3 m springboard
Gold medal – first place	2004 Madrid	3 m synchro
Gold medal – first place	2008 Eindhoven	3 m springboard
Gold medal – first place	2008 Eindhoven	3 m synchro
Silver medal – second place	1995 Vienna	3 m springboard
Silver medal – second place	1997 Seville	3 m synchro
Silver medal – second place	2002 Berlin	3 m synchro
Universiade
Gold medal – first place	1999 Palma de Mallorca	1 m springboard
Bronze medal – third place	1999 Palma de Mallorca	3 m springboard

Yuliya Vladimirovna Pakhalina (Russian: Юлия Владимировна Пахалина, born 12 September 1977) is a Russian diver. She won the gold medal in the 2000 Summer Olympics in the 3m Synchronized Springboard with partner Vera Ilyina.

== Biography ==
Yuliya Pakhalina was born in Penza. In 1994 she graduated from Penza Secondary School No. 28. In the same year she was awarded the title of World-Class Master of Sports.

She graduated from the Faculty of Physical Education Penza State University.

She moved to Houston, Texas before the 2000 Summer Olympics to train with her partner Vera Ilyina, under the direction of Head Coach Jane Figuiredo (University of Houston) and competed for the University of Houston's swimming and diving team. The two divers trained at the Woodland's Pool several times.
