= Jia Tong =

Chinese diver

Personal information
- Born: August 21, 1991 (age 34) Nanchong, Sichuan, China
- Height: 1.50 m (4 ft 11 in)
- Weight: 30 kg (66 lb)

Sport
- Country: China
- Sport: Diving
- Event(s): 10 m, 10 m synchro
- Retired: 2007
Medal record
Event	1st	2nd	3rd
World Championships	2	-	1
FINA Diving World Cup	2	-	-
Asian Games	1	-	-
World Championships
Gold medal – first place	2005 Montréal	Platform Synchro
Gold medal – first place	2007 Melbourne	Platform Synchro
Bronze medal – third place	2005 Montréal	Platform
Asian Games
Gold medal – first place	2006 Doha	Platform Synchro

Jia Tong (Chinese: 贾童, born August 21, 1991) is a Chinese athlete who competes in diving.

== Major achievements ==
She earned the gold medal with Chen Ruolin at the 2006 Asian Games.
