= Cynthia Potter =

American diver

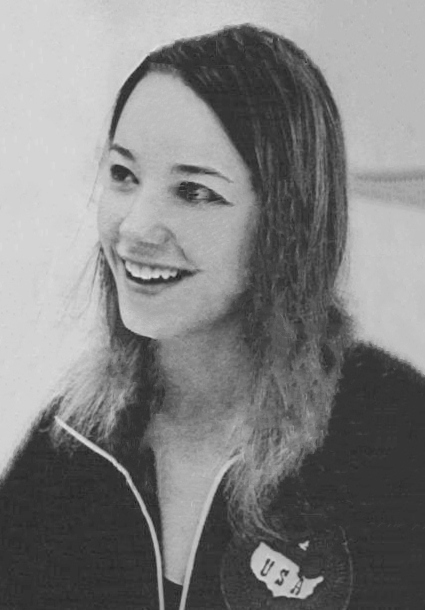
- Potter in 1971

Personal information
- Nickname: Cindy
- Born: Cynthia Ann Potter; August 27, 1950 (age 75) Houston, Texas, U.S.
- Height: 158 cm (5 ft 2 in)
- Spouse(s): Jim McIngvale (m. 1975; div. 1978) Peter Lasser (m. 1996)

Sport
- Country: United States
- Event(s): 3 m springboard, 10 m platform
- College team: Indiana
- Club: Indiana Hoosiers
Medal record
Representing United States
Olympic Games
Bronze medal – third place	1976 Montreal	3 m springboard
World Championships
Silver medal – second place	1978 West Berlin	3 m springboard
Pan American Games
Bronze medal – third place	1975 Mexico City	Springboard
Summer Universiade
Gold medal – first place	1970 Turin	3 m springboard
Silver medal – second place	1970 Turin	10 m platform

Cynthia Ann Potter (born August 27, 1950) is an American former Olympic diver and diving color commentator. She was a member of three Olympic diving teams, winning a bronze medal in the 3 m springboard in 1976.

== Career ==
=== Diving ===
An 11-time All-American, Potter won a record 28 national diving championships. She was the U.S. outdoor champion in the 1-meter springboard from 1968 through 1977. Potter was the 3-meter springboard champion in 1971 and 1972 and from 1975 through 1977; and took first in the platform competition in 1970 and 1971. Indoors, she won 1-meter springboard titles from 1969 through 1973 and in 1976 and 1977, the 3-meter in 1969, 1970, and 1973. Additionally, Potter was chosen as World Diver of the year in springboard competition in 1970, 1971 and 1972.

Potter was a member of the 1968, 1972 and 1976 U.S. Olympic diving teams. She was selected to the 1980 U.S. Olympic diving team, but due to the U.S. boycott of the games that year, Potter was unable to compete. She was one of 461 athletes to receive a Congressional Gold Medal instead. In 1972, she placed seventh on the 3-meter springboard and 21st in the 10-meter platform partially due to a foot injury, and in 1976 Potter claimed a bronze medal in the 3-meter springboard.

In other international competition, Potter won a gold in the 3-meter springboard and a silver in the 10-meter platform at the 1970 World University Games, a bronze in the 3-meter springboard at the 1975 Pan American Games, and a silver in the 3-meter springboard at the 1978 World Championships.

In 1987, Potter was inducted into the International Swimming Hall of Fame.

=== Television ===
Potter provided the color commentary for ABC for diving at the 1984 Summer Olympics. In the late 1980s, 1990s, and 2000s, she served as color commentator for televised U.S. and international diving competitions, primarily for NBC Sports. Potter continues to provide color commentary for its Olympic diving coverage and served as an analyst for its diving coverage for the next eight Olympics, including diving at the 2008 Summer Olympics, diving at the 2012 Summer Olympics, 2016 Rio, 2020 Tokyo Olympics, and the 2024 Paris.

== Personal life ==
Potter graduated from Indiana University in 1973 with a degree in secondary education, and also received a graduate degree from the University of Arizona in teaching and teacher education. She married businessman Jim McIngvale in 1975. Their marriage lasted three years before McIngvale filed for divorce, citing "conflict of personalities". She later remarried to TV producer Peter Lasser in 1996. Since retiring from diving, she served as diving coach at The Westminster Schools in Atlanta, Georgia until 2020, and has served as a diving coach at Southern Methodist University, and the University of Arizona.

== See also ==
- List of members of the International Swimming Hall of Fame
