= Klaus Dibiasi =

Italian diver (born 1947)

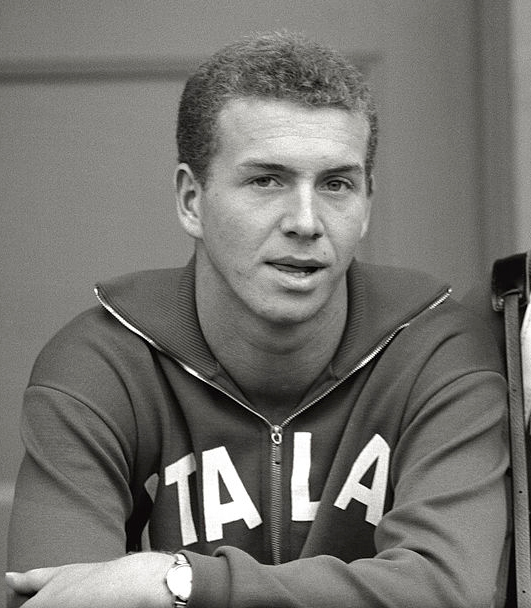
- Klaus Dibiasi at the 1964 Olympics

Personal information
- Nationality: Italian
- Born: 6 October 1947 (age 78) Solbad Hall, Austria
- Height: 1.80 m (5 ft 11 in)
- Weight: 74 kg (163 lb)

Sport
- Country: Italy
- Sport: Diving
- Club: Bolzano Nuoto
Medal record
Event	1st	2nd	3rd
Olympic Games	3	2	0
World Championships	2	2	0
European Championships	3	2	0
Mediterranean Games	2	3	0
Total	10	9	0
Olympic Games
Gold medal – first place	1968 Mexico City	10 m platform
Gold medal – first place	1972 Munich	10 m platform
Gold medal – first place	1976 Montreal	10 m platform
Silver medal – second place	1964 Tokyo	10 m platform
Silver medal – second place	1968 Mexico City	3 m springboard
World Championships
Gold medal – first place	1973 Belgrade	10 m platform
Gold medal – first place	1975 Cali	10 m platform
Silver medal – second place	1973 Belgrade	3 m springboard
Silver medal – second place	1975 Cali	3 m springboard
European Championships
Gold medal – first place	1966 Utrecht	10 m platform
Gold medal – first place	1974 Vienna	3 m springboard
Gold medal – first place	1974 Vienna	10 m platform
Silver medal – second place	1970 Barcelona	3 m springboard
Silver medal – second place	1970 Barcelona	10 m platform
Summer Universiade
Gold medal – first place	1970 Turin	3 m springboard
Gold medal – first place	1970 Turin	10 m platform

Klaus Dibiasi (born 6 October 1947) is a former sports diver from Italy, who competed in four consecutive Summer Olympics for his country, starting in 1964. He dominated the platform event from the late 1960s to the mid-1970s, winning three Olympic gold medals.

== Biography ==
Dibiasi won a silver medal in platform diving at the 1964 Summer Olympics, and went on to win gold in the same event at the next three Games (1968, 1972, and 1976). Dibiasi is the only Olympic diver to have won three successive gold medals, and he is the only diver to have won medals at four Summer Olympics. A silver in the springboard in 1968 gave him a total of five Olympic medals. He also performed well at the first two FINA World Aquatic Championships (1973 and 1975), winning four medals. Dibiasi won 11 national platform and 7 springboard titles.

Dibiasi was born in Solbad Hall, Austria, to Italian parents, who returned to Italy when he was a child. He was the first Italian to become an Olympic diving champion. He was coached by his father, Carlo, a former Italian champion (1933–1936) and a competitor at the 1936 Summer Olympics in Berlin, who finished in tenth place. Klaus Dibiasi also later coached the Italian diving team.

== Awards ==
Period	Individual						Team						Total									
Period	Olympics			World Ch.			Olympics			World Ch.			Individual			Team			Individual + Team			
Period	Gold medal	Silver medal	Bronze medal	Gold medal	Silver medal	Bronze medal	Gold medal	Silver medal	Bronze medal	Gold medal	Silver medal	Bronze medal										Tot.
1964–1976	3	2	0	2	2	0	–	–	–	-	-	-	5	4	0	-	-	-	5	4	0	9

== See also ==
- List of members of the International Swimming Hall of Fame
- List of multiple Olympic gold medalists
- List of multiple Olympic gold medalists in one event
- List of multiple Olympic medalists in one event
- List of flag bearers for Italy at the Olympics
- Italian men gold medalist at the Olympics and World Championships

Summer Olympics
Preceded by Abdon Pamich	Flag bearer for Italy; 1976 Montreal	Succeeded by Sara Simeoni
