= Vladimir Aleynik =

Belarusian diver (born 1952)

Personal information
- Native name: Владимир Петрович Алейник
- Full name: Vladimir Petrovich Aleynik
- Nationality: Belarus
- Born: 12 September 1952 (age 73) Smalyavichy, Belarusian SSR, Soviet Union

Sport
- Country: Soviet Union
- Sport: Diving
Medal record
Men's diving
Representing the Soviet Union
Olympic Games
Silver medal – second place	1980 Moscow	10 m platform
Bronze medal – third place	1976 Montreal	10 m platform
World Championships
Silver medal – second place	1982 Guayaquil	10 m platform
Bronze medal – third place	1978 West Berlin	10 m platform
European Championships
Gold medal – first place	1977 Jönköping	10 m platform
Silver medal – second place	1981 Split	10 m platform
Universiade
Gold medal – first place	1979 Mexico City	10 m platform
Bronze medal – third place	1981 Bucharest	10 m platform

Vladimir Petrovich Aleynik (born 12 September 1952) is a Belarusian former diver who competed in the 1976 Summer Olympics and in the 1980 Summer Olympics.
