= Sun Shuwei =

Chinese diver

Personal information
- Born: February 1, 1976 (age 50) Jieyang, Guangdong, China
Medal record
Men's diving
Representing China
Olympic Games
Gold medal – first place	1992 Barcelona	10m Platform
World Championships
Gold medal – first place	1991 Perth	10m Platform
Gold medal – first place	1998 Perth	10m Platform Synchro
Silver medal – second place	1994 Rome	10m Platform
Asian Games
Gold medal – first place	1990 Beijing	10m Platform
Gold medal – first place	1990 Beijing	Team Event
Gold medal – first place	1994 Hiroshima	10m Platform

Sun Shuwei (simplified Chinese: 孙淑伟; traditional Chinese: 孫淑偉; pinyin: Sūn Shúwěi; Jyutping: Syun1 Suk1 Wai5; born February 1, 1976) is a Chinese diver.

Sun started diving training in 1984. As a talented athlete, he entered China national diving team in 1989. In 1990, he won the gold medal in the 10 meter platform in Asian Games. In next year, he won gold metals in both Diving World Cup and World Diving Championship.

He won the gold medal in the 10 meter platform event at the 1992 Summer Olympics, at only 16 years of age.

He suffered from retina disease in 1993, and took a break for a while. In 1994, he returned to the diving pool after surgery, and in Diving World Cup in 1995, he again defeated all the opponents, leading the second by more than 50 points.

Before the Olympic Games in Atlanta in 1996, according to national regulation, the records of the medalists in Olympic Games would be counted into provincial scores in China's National Games held in the following year. Thus, the competition among provinces was fierce. Finally, the national diving team decided to hold selection contests to determine the national representatives to the Olympics. There were two rounds of contests, and the first, second and third places would score 7, 5 and 4 respectively. In the end, Sun's close competitors, Tian Liang from Shaanxi and Xiao Hailiang from Hubei, each won a first and a third places, while for some reason, Sun himself, won second place twice. As a result, he did not make the trip to Atlanta. The outcome was somehow shocking nationwide at that time, especially when Xiao Hailiang and Tian Liang only won the third and the fourth places in that Olympics. This incident became Sun's regret for lifetime.

After that, Sun was still active in many kinds of competitions. In 1998 and 1999, together with Tian Liang, he won 10 meter platform double diving in Diving World Cup and World Diving Championship. However, due to chronic injury, he did not attend the Olympic Games in Sydney.

Sun was retired officially in 2001. Later, in 2002, he became a coach in national diving team. In 2005, he returned to Guangdong and became a coach in the provincial diving team there.

== See also ==
- List of members of the International Swimming Hall of Fame
