= Irina Kalinina =

Soviet diver (born 1959)

Personal information
- Born: 8 February 1959 (age 67) Penza, Soviet Union

Sport
- Sport: Diving
Medal record
Representing the Soviet Union
Olympic Games
Gold medal – first place	1980 Moscow	3m Springboard
World Championships
Gold medal – first place	1975 Cali	3m Springboard
Gold medal – first place	1978 West Berlin	3m Springboard
Gold medal – first place	1978 West Berlin	10m Platform
Silver medal – second place	1975 Cali	10m Platform
Bronze medal – third place	1973 Belgrade	10m Platform
European Championships
Silver medal – second place	1974 Vienna	3m Springboard
Silver medal – second place	1974 Vienna	10 m Platform
Bronze medal – third place	1977 Jönköping	3m Springboard
Bronze medal – third place	1977 Jönköping	10 m Platform
Bronze medal – third place	1981 Split	3m Springboard
Universiade
Gold medal – first place	1977 Sofia	Springboard
Gold medal – first place	1977 Sofia	Platform
Gold medal – first place	1979 Mexico City	3 m springboard
Silver medal – second place	1979 Mexico City	10 m platform

Irina Vladimirovna Kalinina (Ирина Владимировна Калинина; born 8 February 1959) is a former Soviet diver and olympic champion. She competed at the 1980 Olympic Games in Moscow, where she won the gold medal in Women's 3 metre springboard.

== Sports career ==
At 1976 Montreal Olympics, she was fourth on the platform and seventh on the 3m springboard. At 1980 Olympics in Moscow she became the champion on the springboard.

She was a three-time world champion, won 5 medals at the European Championships. She was a 20-time prize-winner of the USSR championships.

In 1980 she graduated from the Faculty of Physical Education Penza State University. She worked as an athlete-coach of the USSR national team in diving in 1972–84. From 1984 she worked as a teaching coach at Specialized Children and Youth Sports School of the Olympic Reserve.

In 1984 she left the big sport. In 1984, the documentary “And all over again, every time” (directed by T. Chubakova) about the end of her career and the beginning of coaching was shot at CSDF.

== Coaching career ==
On completing her career, she works as a coach in Penza. She is an Honoured Coach of Russia.

Her husband Valery Bazhin is a former diver, World-Class Master of Sports of the USSR, Honoured Coach of Russia.

Her daughter Nadezhda Bazhina is a diver, World-Class Master of Sports of Russia, European champion, participant of the 2012 Summer Olympics in London.

In honour of Irina Kalinina, since 1988 an annual diving competition has been held in Penza.

== See also ==
- List of members of the International Swimming Hall of Fame
