= Falk Hoffmann =

East German diver

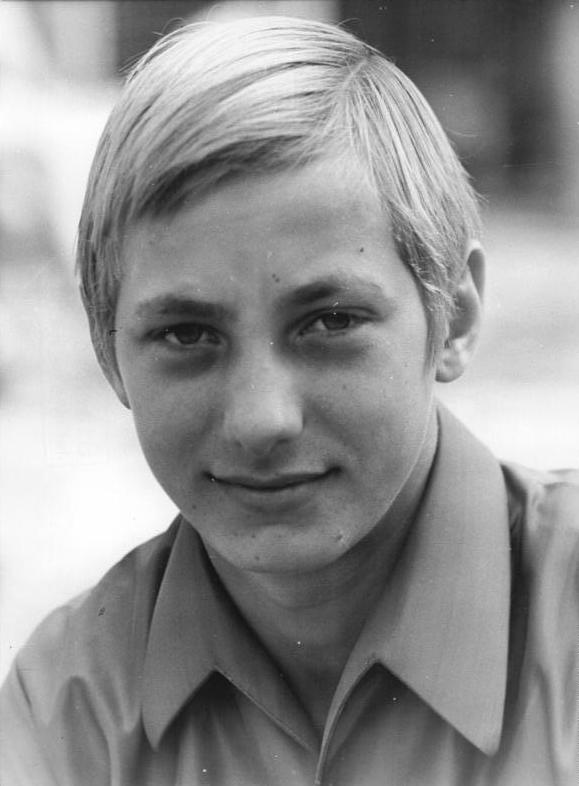

Personal information
- Born: 29 August 1952 (age 73) Chemnitz, East Germany

Sport
- Sport: Diving
Medal record
Representing East Germany
Olympic Games
Gold medal – first place	1980 Moscow	10 m platform
World Championships
Silver medal – second place	1978 West Berlin	3 m springboard
Silver medal – second place	1978 West Berlin	10 m platform
Bronze medal – third place	1973 Belgrade	10 m platform
European Championships
Gold medal – first place	1977 Jönköping	3 m springboard
Silver medal – second place	1974 Vienna	10 m platform
Bronze medal – third place	1977 Jönköping	10 m platform

Falk Hoffmann (born 29 August 1952) is a retired diver from East Germany, who won the gold medal in the men's 10 m platform event at the 1980 Summer Olympics in Moscow, Soviet Union. He competed in three consecutive Summer Olympics for his native country, starting in 1972 (Munich). He ended his career in 1982.

== See also ==
- List of members of the International Swimming Hall of Fame
