= Dmitri Sautin =

Russian diver

Dmitry Sautin
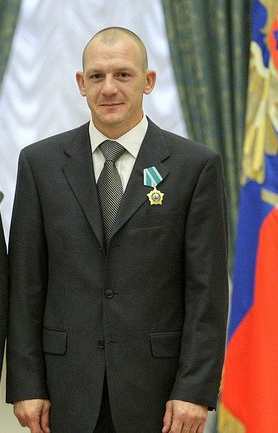
- Sautin in 2009

Personal information
- Full name: Dmitry Ivanovich Sautin
- Born: 15 March 1974 (age 52) Voronezh, Moscow Oblast, Russian SFSR, Soviet Union
- Height: 1.74 m (5 ft 8 1/2 in)

Sport
- Country: Russia
- Partner: Yuriy Kunakov
- Former partner(s): Aleksandr Dobroskok, Igor Loukachine
Medal record
Olympic Games
Representing the Unified Team
Bronze medal – third place	1992 Barcelona	3 m Springboard
Representing Russia
Gold medal – first place	1996 Atlanta	10 m Platform
Gold medal – first place	2000 Sydney	10 m Platform Synchro
Silver medal – second place	2000 Sydney	3 m Spring Synchro
Silver medal – second place	2008 Beijing	3 m Spring Synchro
Bronze medal – third place	2000 Sydney	10 m Platform
Bronze medal – third place	2000 Sydney	3 m Springboard
Bronze medal – third place	2004 Athens	3 m Springboard
World Championships
Representing Russia
Gold medal – first place	1994 Rome	10 m Platform
Gold medal – first place	1998 Perth	3 m Springboard
Gold medal – first place	1998 Perth	10 m Platform
Gold medal – first place	2001 Fukuoka	3 m Springboard
Gold medal – first place	2003 Barcelona	3 m Spring Synchro
Silver medal – second place	1994 Rome	3 m Springboard
Bronze medal – third place	2001 Fukuoka	3 m Spring Synchro
Bronze medal – third place	2003 Barcelona	3 m Springboard
Bronze medal – third place	2007 Melbourne	3 m Springboard
European Championships
Representing Soviet Union
Silver medal – second place	1991 Athens	10 m Platform
Representing Russia
Gold medal – first place	1993 Sheffield	10 m Platform
Gold medal – first place	1995 Vienna	3 m Springboard
Gold medal – first place	1997 Seville	3 m Springboard
Gold medal – first place	1999 Istanbul	10 m Platform
Gold medal – first place	2000 Helsinki	3 m Springboard
Gold medal – first place	2000 Helsinki	10 m Platform
Gold medal – first place	2000 Helsinki	10 m Platform Synchro
Gold medal – first place	2002 Berlin	3 m Springboard
Gold medal – first place	2002 Berlin	3 m Spring Synchro
Gold medal – first place	2006 Budapest	3 m Springboard
Gold medal – first place	2008 Eindhoven	3 m Springboard
Gold medal – first place	2008 Eindhoven	3 m Spring Synchro
Silver medal – second place	1993 Sheffield	3 m Springboard
Silver medal – second place	2000 Helsinki	3 m Spring Synchro
Silver medal – second place	2006 Budapest	3 m Spring Synchro
Bronze medal – third place	1995 Vienna	10 m Platform
Bronze medal – third place	2010 Budapest	3 m Springboard Synchro

Dmitri Ivanovich Sautin (Russian: Дмитрий Иванович Саутин; born 15 March 1974) is a Russian diver who has won more medals than any other Olympic diver. He was born in Voronezh.

Sautin started diving at age seven; however, his diving career almost ended in 1991 when he was stabbed multiple times in an attack. After spending two months in the hospital, he was able to dive at the 1992 Summer Olympics in Barcelona, Spain. He has won medals at the 1992, 1996, 2000, 2004, and the 2008 Olympics.

He is a deputy in the Voronezh Duma.

== See also ==
- List of multiple Summer Olympic medalists
