= Phil Boggs =

American diver (1949–1990)

Personal information
- Full name: Phillip George Boggs
- Born: December 29, 1949 Akron, Ohio, U.S.
- Died: July 4, 1990 (aged 40) Miami, Florida, U.S.
Medal record
Men's diving
Representing the United States
Olympic Games
| Gold medal – first place | 1976 Montreal | 3 m Springboard |
World Championships (LC)
| Gold medal – first place | 1973 Belgrad | 3 m springboard |
| Gold medal – first place | 1975 Cali | 3 m springboard |
| Gold medal – first place | 1978 West Berlin | 3 m springboard |
Pan American Games
| Silver medal – second place | 1975 Mexico City | 3 m springboard |
| Silver medal – second place | 1979 San Juan | 3 m springboard |
| Bronze medal – third place | 1979 San Juan | 10 m platform |

Phillip ("Phil") George Boggs (December 29, 1949 – July 4, 1990) was a diver and Olympic gold medalist from the United States; he won the 3 m springboard event at the 1976 Summer Olympics in Montreal, Canada.

Boggs was born in Akron, Ohio, and graduated from Firestone High School in 1967. He graduated from Florida State University in 1971 and served as an officer in the U.S. Air Force for five years, leaving as a captain in 1976. He was an instructor at the U.S. Air Force Academy and graduated from the University of Michigan Law School in 1979.

Boggs was inducted in the International Swimming Hall of Fame.

Diagnosed with lymphoma, he died at age 40 in 1990 in Miami, Florida.

== See also ==
- List of members of the International Swimming Hall of Fame
