= Diving at the 2001 World Aquatics Championships =

These are the results from the diving competition at the 2001 World Aquatics Championships.

== Medal table ==
Rank	Nation	Gold	Silver	Bronze	Total
1	China (CHN)	8	4	1	13
2	Russia (RUS)	1	2	3	6
3	Canada (CAN)	1	1	0	2
4	Mexico (MEX)	0	2	0	2
5	Australia (AUS)	0	1	2	3
6	Japan (JPN)	0	0	2	2
7	Germany (GER)	0	0	1	1
7	Ukraine (UKR)	0	0	1	1
Totals (8 entries)		10	10	10	30

== Medal summary ==
=== Men ===
Event	Gold	Silver	Bronze
1 m springboard	Wang Feng (CHN); 444.03	Wang Tianling (CHN); 433.14	Alexander Dobroskok (RUS); 414.21
3 m springboard	Dmitri Sautin (RUS); 725.82	Wang Tianling (CHN); 717.27	Ken Terauchi (JPN); 712.38
10 m platform	Tian Liang (CHN); 688.77	Alexandre Despatie (CAN); 670.95	Mathew Helm (AUS); 670.23
3 m springboard synchro	Peng Bo (CHN); Wang Kenan (CHN); 342.63	Joel Rodriguez (MEX); Fernando Platas (MEX); 338.49	Alexander Dobroskok (RUS); Dmitri Sautin (RUS); 335.19
10 m platform synchro	Tian Liang (CHN); Hu Jia (CHN); 361.41	Eduardo Rueda (MEX); Fernando Platas (MEX); 336.63	Roman Volodkov (UKR); Anton Zakharov (UKR); 336.06

=== Women ===
Event	Gold	Silver	Bronze
1 m springboard	Blythe Hartley (CAN); 300.81	Wu Minxia (CHN); 297.57	Zhang Jing (CHN); 294.15
3 m springboard	Guo Jingjing (CHN); 596.67	Irina Lashko (AUS); 552.39	Yuliya Pakhalina (RUS); 543.54
10 m platform	Xu Mian (CHN); 532.65	Duan Qing (CHN); 522.54	Loudy Tourky (AUS); 511.50
3 m springboard synchro	Wu Minxia (CHN); Guo Jingjing (CHN); 347.31	Youlia Pakhalina (RUS); Vera Ilynia (RUS); 320.61	Ditte Kotzian (GER); Conny Schmalfuss (GER); 303.03
10 m platform synchro	Duan Qing (CHN); Sang Xue (CHN); 329.94	Evgeniya Olshevskaya (RUS); Svetlana Timoshinina (RUS); 306.90	Takiri Miyazaki (JPN); Emi Otsuki (JPN); 297.00
