= Diving at the 1996 Summer Olympics – Women's 10 metre platform =

Women's 10 metre platform at the Games of the XXVI Olympiad
- Venue: Georgia Tech Aquatic Center
- Date: 26 July 1996 (Qualifying round); 27 July 1996 (Semifinal & final)
- Competitors: 33 from 21 nations

Medalists
1st place, gold medalist(s)		Fu Mingxia	China
2nd place, silver medalist(s)		Annika Walter	Germany
3rd place, bronze medalist(s)		Mary Ellen Clark	United States

The women's 10 metre platform was one of four diving events included in the Diving at the 1996 Summer Olympics programme.

The competition was split into three phases:

Preliminary round
26 July — Each diver performed five dives without any limitation on the difficulty degree. The 18 divers with the highest total score advanced to the semi-final.
Semi-final
27 July — Each diver performed four dives with difficulty degree limitation. The 12 divers with the highest combined score from the semi-final and preliminary dives advanced to the final.
Final
27 July — Each diver performed five dives without limitation on the difficulty degree. The final ranking was determined by the combined score from the final and semifinal dives.

== Results ==
Rank	Diver	Nation	Preliminary		Semi-final				Final		
Rank	Diver	Nation	Points	Rank	Points	Rank	Total	Rank	Points	Rank	Total
1st place, gold medalist(s)	Fu Mingxia	China	329.25	1	179.94	1	509.19	1	341.64	1	521.58
2nd place, silver medalist(s)	Annika Walter	Germany	298.11	5	166.14	6	464.25	5	313.08	2	479.22
3rd place, bronze medalist(s)	Mary Ellen Clark	United States	253.89	12	174.87	3	428.76	9	298.08	3	472.95
4	Becky Ruehl	United States	323.91	2	163.38	8	487.29	3	291.81	4	455.19
5	Guo Jingjing	China	315.39	4	177.30	2	492.69	2	269.91	6	447.21
6	Olena Zhupina	Ukraine	280.11	7	171.24	4	451.35	6	265.77	7	437.01
7	Irina Vyguzova	Kazakhstan	319.11	3	158.40	12	477.51	4	274.20	5	432.60
8	Olga Khristoforova	Russia	268.65	8	167.07	5	435.72	8	259.05	9	426.12
9	Hayley Allen	Great Britain	251.73	14	158.43	11	410.16	12	259.68	8	418.11
10	Clara Elena Ciocan	Romania	281.52	6	157.41	13	438.93	7	256.05	10	413.46
11	Anja Richter	Austria	266.13	10	160.83	10	426.96	10	247.62	11	408.45
12	Ute Wetzig	Germany	258.93	11	151.44	15	410.37	11	215.91	12	367.35
13	Choe Myong-hwa	North Korea	248.10	15	161.25	9	409.35	13	did not advance		
14	Svitlana Serbina	Ukraine	244.05	18	165.06	7	409.11	14	did not advance		
15	Nataliya Chikina	Kazakhstan	267.18	9	138.60	18	405.78	15	did not advance		
16	Radoslava Georgieva	Bulgaria	246.06	16	156.48	14	402.54	16	did not advance		
17	María Alcalá	Mexico	252.36	13	147.99	17	400.35	17	did not advance		
18	Lesley Ward	Great Britain	244.98	17	150.99	16	395.97	18	did not advance		
19	Vyninka Arlow	Australia	243.57	19	did not advance						
20	Svetlana Timoshinina	Russia	242.76	20	did not advance						
21	Paige Gordon	Canada	242.13	21	did not advance						
22	Anișoara Oprea	Romania	233.34	22	did not advance						
23	Ri Ok-rim	North Korea	230.16	23	did not advance						
24	Anne Montminy	Canada	229.32	24	did not advance						
25	Vanessa Baker	Australia	225.84	25	did not advance						
26	Daphne Hernández	Costa Rica	217.77	26	did not advance						
27	Dolores Sáez	Spain	216.36	27	did not advance						
28	Francesca d'Oriano	Italy	202.86	28	did not advance						
29	Julie Danaux	France	201.27	29	did not advance						
30	Ana Carolina Itzaina	Uruguay	191.40	30	did not advance						
31	Im Youn-gi	South Korea	180.15	31	did not advance						
32	Kim Yeo-young	South Korea	166.56	32	did not advance						
33	Sukrutai Tommaoros	Thailand	115.44	33	did not advance						

== Sources ==
- The Atlanta Committee for the Olympic Games (ACOG) (1997). The Official Report of the Centennial Olympic Games - Volume III: The Competition Results (pdf) (in English and French). Atlanta, GA: Peachtree Publishers. p. 32. ISBN 1-56145-169-X. OCLC 36994823.
