= Diving at the 2003 World Aquatics Championships =

These are the results of the diving competition at the 2003 World Aquatics Championships, which took place in Barcelona, Spain.

== Medal table ==
Rank	Nation	Gold	Silver	Bronze	Total
1	China (CHN)	4	4	4	12
2	Russia (RUS)	2	2	2	6
3	Australia (AUS)	2	2	0	4
4	Canada (CAN)	2	0	1	3
5	Germany (GER)	0	1	1	2
6	Ukraine (UKR)	0	1	0	1
7	Finland (FIN)	0	0	1	1
7	Mexico (MEX)	0	0	1	1
Totals (8 entries)		10	10	10	30

== Medal summary ==
=== Men ===
Event	Gold	Silver	Bronze
1 m springboard	Xiang Xu (CHN); 431.94	Wang Kenan (CHN); 412.41	Joona Puhakka (FIN); 391.26
3 m springboard	Aleksandr Dobroskok (RUS); 788.37	Peng Bo (CHN); 780.84	Dmitri Sautin (RUS); 776.64
10 m platform	Alexandre Despatie (CAN); 716.91	Mathew Helm (AUS); 697.74	Tian Liang (CHN); 696.06
3 m springboard synchro	(Russia) Aleksandr Dobroskok (Russia) Dmitri Sautin; 369.18	(China) Wang Tianling (China) Wang Feng; 343.29	(Germany) Tobias Schellenberg (Germany) Andreas Wels; 334.44
10 m platform synchro	(Australia) Mathew Helm (Australia) Robert Newbery; 384.60	(Ukraine) Roman Volodkov (Ukraine) Anton Zakharov; 372.60	(China) Tian Liang (China) Hu Jia; 367.14

=== Women ===
Event	Gold	Silver	Bronze
1 m springboard	(Australia) Irina Lashko; 299.97	(Germany) Conny Schmalfuss; 296.13	(Canada) Blythe Hartley; 291.33
3 m springboard	(China) Guo Jingjing; 617.94	(Russia) Yuliya Pakhalina; 611.58	(China) Wu Minxia; 589.80
10 m platform	(Canada) Émilie Heymans; 597.45	(China) Lao Lishi; 595.56	(China) Li Na; 563.43
3 m springboard synchro	(China) Guo Jingjing (China) Minxia Wu; 357.30	(Russia) Vera Ilyina (Russia) Yuliya Pakhalina; 321.24	(Mexico) Paola Espinosa (Mexico) Laura Sánchez; 299.64
10 m platform synchro	(China) Lao Lishi (China) Li Ting; 344.58	(Australia) Lynda Dackiw (Australia) Loudy Tourky; 323.34	(Russia) Evgenya Olshevskaya (Russia) Svetlana Timoshinina; 300.12
