= 2006 FINA Diving World Cup =

Diving competition in Changshu, China

- Host city: Changshu, China
- Date(s): July 19–23, 2006
- Events: 8
- Website: FINA event site

The 2006 FINA Diving World Cup was held in Changshu, China from July 19 to July 23, 2006.

== Medal winners ==
=== Men ===
Event	Gold	Silver	Bronze
Springboard Finals
1 m	He Chong; China	Luo Yutong; China	Chris Colwill; United States
3 m	Qin Kai; China	Alexander Dobroskok; Russia	Troy Dumais; United States
3 m synchro	He Chong; Wang Feng; China	Troy Dumais; Mitchell Richeson; United States	Tobias Schellenberg; Andreas Wels; Germany
Platform Finals
10 m	Zhou Lüxin; China	Lin Yue; China	Alexy Kravchenko; Russia
10 m synchro	Huo Liang; Lin Yue; China	David Boudia; Thomas Finchum; United States	Kyung Min-kwon; Kwan Hoon-cho; South Korea

=== Women ===
Event	Gold	Silver	Bronze
Springboard Finals
1 m	Guo Jingjing; China	Wu Minxia; China	Blythe Hartley; Canada
3 m	Wu Minxia; China	Yuliya Pakhalina; Russia	Guo Jingjing; China
3 m synchro	Guo Jingjing; Li Ting; China	Ariel Rittenhouse; Kelci Bryant; United States	Heike Fisher; Ditte Kotzian; Germany
Platform Finals
10 m	Jia Tong; China	Lao Lishi; China	Émilie Heymans; Canada
10 m synchro	Chen Ruolin; Jia Tong; China	Mai Nakagawa; Misako Yamashita; Japan	Meagham Benfeito; Roseline Filion; Canada

Preceded by 2004 FINA Diving World Cup (Athens, Greece)	2006 FINA Diving World Cup (Changshu, China)	Succeeded by 2008 FINA Diving World Cup (Beijing, China)
