= 2004 FINA Diving World Cup =

International diving competition

2006 FINA Diving World Cup
- Host city: Greece
- Events: 8
- Website: FINA event site

The 2004 FINA Diving World Cup was held in Athens, Greece and was a qualifying event for 2004 Summer Olympics in Athens.

== Medal winners ==
=== Men ===
Event	Gold	Silver	Bronze
Springboard Finals
3 m	Alexandre Despatie; Canada	Wang Feng; China	Peng Bo; China
3 m synchro	Peng Bo; Wang Kenan; China	Steven Barnett; Robert Newbery; Australia	Tobias Schellenberg; Andreas Wels; Germany
Platform Finals
10 m	Tian Liang; China	Hu Jia; China	Alexandre Despatie; Canada
10 m synchro	Tian Liang; Yang Jinghui; China	Leon Taylor; Peter Waterfield; Great Britain	Phillippe Comtois; Alexandre Despatie; Canada

=== Women ===
Event	Gold	Silver	Bronze
Springboard Finals
3 m	Yuliya Pakhalina; Russia	Guo Jingjing; China	Wu Minxia; China
3 m synchro	Guo Jingjing; Wu Minxia; China	Vera Ilyina; Yuliya Pakhalina; Russia	Ditte Kotzian; Conny Schmalfuss; Germany
Platform Finals
10 m	Laura Wilkinson; United States	Loudy Wiggins; Australia	Takiri Miyazaki; Japan
10 m synchro	Lao Lishi; Li Ting; China	Chantelle Newbery; Loudy Wiggins; Australia	Annett Gamm; Nora Subschinski; Germany

Preceded by 2002 FINA Diving World Cup (Seville, Spain)	2004 FINA Diving World Cup (Athens, Greece)	Succeeded by 2006 FINA Diving World Cup (Changshu, China)
