= Diving at the 2004 Summer Olympics =

Diving at the Games of the XXVIII Olympiad
- Venue: Olympic Aquatic Centre
- Dates: 14 – 28 August 2004
- Competitors: 129 from 30 nations

At the 2004 Summer Olympics, in Athens, eight diving events were contested during a competition that took place at the Olympic Aquatic Centre, from 20 to 28 August (14 and 16 August for the synchronized events), comprising a total of 129 divers from 30 nations.

== Medal summary ==
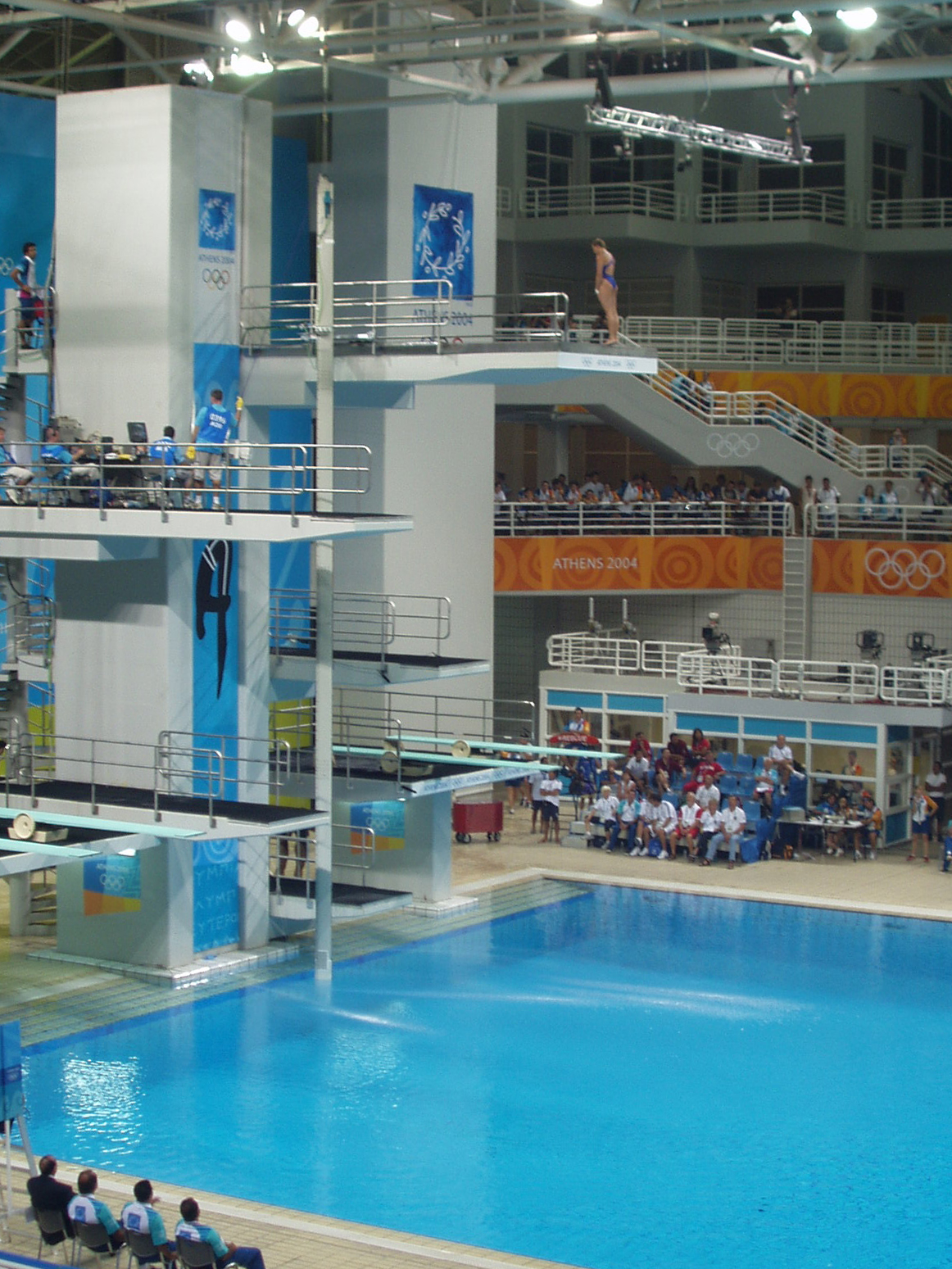
View of the diving platforms at the Olympic Aquatic Centre in Athens, during the 2004 Summer Olympics.

=== Men ===
Event	Gold	Silver	Bronze
3 m springboard	Peng Bo; China	Alexandre Despatie; Canada	Dmitri Sautin; Russia
10 m platform	Hu Jia; China	Mathew Helm; Australia	Tian Liang; China
Synchronized 3 m springboard	Thomas Bimis and Nikolaos Siranidis (GRE)	Tobias Schellenberg and Andreas Wels (GER)	Steven Barnett and Robert Newbery (AUS)
Synchronized 10 m platform	Tian Liang and Yang Jinghui (CHN)	Peter Waterfield and Leon Taylor (GBR)	Mathew Helm and Robert Newbery (AUS)

=== Women ===
Event	Gold	Silver	Bronze
3 m springboard	Guo Jingjing; China	Wu Minxia; China	Yulia Pakhalina; Russia
10 m platform	Chantelle Newbery; Australia	Lao Lishi; China	Loudy Tourky; Australia
Synchronized 3 m springboard	Wu Minxia and Guo Jingjing (CHN)	Vera Ilina and Yulia Pakhalina (RUS)	Irina Lashko and Chantelle Newbery (AUS)
Synchronized 10 m platform	Lao Lishi and Li Ting (CHN)	Natalia Goncharova and Yulia Koltunova (RUS)	Blythe Hartley and Émilie Heymans (CAN)

== Medal table ==
Rank	Nation	Gold	Silver	Bronze	Total
1	China	6	2	1	9
2	Australia	1	1	4	6
3	Greece	1	0	0	1
4	Russia	0	2	2	4
5	Canada	0	1	1	2
6	Germany	0	1	0	1
6	Great Britain	0	1	0	1
Totals (7 entries)		8	8	8	24

== Participating nations ==
Here are listed the nations that were represented in the diving events and, in brackets, the number of national competitors.

- Australia (7)
- Austria (2)
- Belarus (3)
- Bermuda (1)
- Brazil (3)
- Canada (6)
- China (10)
- Colombia (1)
- Cuba (6)
- Finland (2)
- France (1)
- Germany (10)
- Great Britain (7)
- Greece (8)
- Hungary (3)
- Italy (6)
- Japan (2)
- Malaysia (3)
- Mexico (5)
- North Korea (3)
- Puerto Rico (1)
- Romania (1)
- Russia (9)
- South Africa (1)
- Spain (4)
- Sweden (1)
- Switzerland (1)
- Ukraine (8)
- United States (10)
- Venezuela (1)

== See also ==
- Diving at the 2003 Pan American Games
