= 1999 FINA Diving World Cup =

New Zealand diving cup in 1999

- Host city: Wellington, New Zealand
- Events: 10
- Website: FINA event site

The 1999 FINA Diving World Cup was held in Wellington, New Zealand.

== Medal winners ==
=== Men ===
Event	Gold	Silver	Bronze
Springboard Finals
1 m	Zhou Yilin; China	Wang Tianling; China	Andreas Wels; Germany
3 m	Fernando Platas; Mexico	Andreas Wels; Germany	Yu Zhuocheng; China
3 m synchro	Xiao Hailiang; Yu Zhuocheng; China	Chris Mantilla; Brian Gillooly; United States	Stefan Ahrens; Andreas Wels; Germany
Platform Finals
10 m	Tian Liang; China	He Wei; China	Mark Ruiz; United States
10 m synchro	Sun Shuwei; Tian Liang; China	Matthew Helm; Tony Lawson; Australia	Fernando Platas; Eduardo Rueda; Mexico

=== Women ===
Event	Gold	Silver	Bronze
Springboard Finals
1 m	Zhang Jing; China	Chantelle Michell; Australia	Yang Lan; China
3 m	Liang Xiaoqiao; China	Emilie Heymans; Canada	Guo Jingjing; China
3 m synchro	Guo Jingjing; Yang Lan; China	Irina Lashko; Yuliya Pakhalina; Russia	Hanna Sorokina; Olena Zhupina; Ukraine
Platform Finals
10 m	Sang Xue; China	Olena Zhupina; Ukraine	Rebecca Gilmore; Australia
10 m synchro	Li Na; Sang Xue; China	Philippa Tosh; Rebecca Gilmore; Australia	Ute Wetzig; Anke Piper; Germany

Preceded by 1997 FINA Diving World Cup (Mexico City, Mexico)	1999 FINA Diving World Cup (Wellington, New Zealand)	Succeeded by 2000 FINA Diving World Cup (Sydney, Australia)
