= 2002 FINA Diving World Cup =

International diving competition

- Host city: Seville, Spain
- Events: 10
- Website: FINA event site

The 2002 FINA Diving World Cup was held in Seville, Spain.

== Medal winners ==
=== Men ===
Event	Gold	Silver	Bronze
Springboard Finals
1 m	Xu Xiang; China	Alexandre Despatie; Canada	José Miguel Gil; Spain
3 m	Dmitri Sautin; Russia	Peng Bo; China	Wang Tianling; China
3 m synchro	Wang Feng; Wang Tianling; China	Steven Barnett; Robert Newbery; Australia	Dimitri Baibakov; Dmitri Sautin; Russia
Platform Finals
10 m	Tian Liang; China	Hu Jia; China	José Guerra; Cuba
10 m synchro	Luo Yutong; Tian Liang; China	Erik Fornaris; José Guerra; Cuba	Matthew Helm; Robert Newbery; Australia

=== Women ===
Event	Gold	Silver	Bronze
Springboard Finals
1 m	Guo Jingjing; China	Irina Lashko; Australia	Heike Fischer; Germany
3 m	Guo Jingjing; China	Wu Minxia; China	Irina Lashko; Australia
3 m synchro	Vera Ilyina; Yuliya Pakhalina; Russia	Guo Jingjing; Wu Minxia; China	Ditte Kotzian; Conny Schmalfuss; Germany
Platform Finals
10 m	Lao Lishi; China	Kimiko Soldati; United States	Li Ting; China
10 m synchro	Lao Lishi; Li Ting; China	Evgenia Olshevskaya; Svetlana Timoshinina; Russia	Rebecca Gilmore; Anna Mcilwaine; Australia

Preceded by 2000 FINA Diving World Cup (Sydney, Australia)	2002 FINA Diving World Cup (Seville, Spain)	Succeeded by 2004 FINA Diving World Cup (Athens, Greece)
