= Diving at the 2001 World Aquatics Championships – Men's synchronized 3 metre springboard =

Following are the results of the Men's 3 m synchro springboard diving event at the 2001 World Aquatics Championships held in Fukuoka, Japan, on July 22, 2001.

In the men's 3m springboard Bo Peng and Ke-Nan Wang from China held the lead throughout the final round from the first round of six. Their winning total was 342.63. Peng commented on their win, "It was my first world championships and I was very nervous. I think we performed very well and timing was perfect.

In the third dive, the Mexican duo of Joel Rodríguez and Fernando Platas edged ahead of the Russians Aleksandr Dobroskok and Dmitri Sautin. The Mexicans took the silver with 338.49 and Russian close but settling for the bronze with 335.19. Sautin said, "I had to have an operation, and I'm still undergoing therapy. I'm feeling tired. In light of that the bronze medal is good."

== Results ==
Green denotes finalists

Rank	Diver	Nationality	Preliminary		Final	
Rank	Diver	Nationality	Points	Rank	Points	Rank
1st place, gold medalist(s)	Bo Peng; Ke-Nan Wang	China	329.82	1	342.63	1
2nd place, silver medalist(s)	Joel Rodríguez; Fernando Platas	Mexico	313.17	3	338.49	2
3rd place, bronze medalist(s)	Aleksandr Dobroskok; Dmitri Sautin	Russia	318.00	2	335.19	3
4	Mark Shipman; Antonio Ally	Great Britain	271.59	8	319.38	4
5	Andreas Wels; Patrick Schellenberg	Germany	300.51	5	310.68	5
6	Robert Newbery; Steven Barnett	Australia	308.43	4	307.08	6
7	Troy Dumais; Thomas Davidson	USA	281.37	7	284.94	7
8	José Miguel Gil; Rafael Álvarez	Spain	283.26	6	282.72	8
9	Ville Vahtola; Joona Puhakka	Finland	271.17	9		
10	Dmytro Lysenko; Eduard Safonov	Ukraine	270.18	10		
11	Nicola Marconi; Tommaso Marconi	Italy	269.52	11		
12	Rossharisham Roslan; Yeoh Ken Nee	Malaysia	264.78	12		
13	Erick Fornaris; José Antonio Guerra	Cuba	256.20	13		
14	Kiichiro Miyamoto; Kotaro Miyamoto	Japan	240.54	14		
