= Diving at the 2004 Summer Olympics – Women's 3 metre springboard =

Women's 3 metre springboard at the Games of the XXVIII Olympiad

Medalists
1st place, gold medalist(s)		Guo Jingjing	China
2nd place, silver medalist(s)		Wu Minxia	China
3rd place, bronze medalist(s)		Yulia Pakhalina	Russia

The women's 3 metre springboard was one of eight diving events included in the Diving at the 2004 Summer Olympics programme.

The competition was split into three phases:

Preliminary round
25 August — Each diver performed a front dive, a back dive, a reverse dive, an inward dive and a twisting dive. There were no limitations in degree of difficulty. The 18 divers with the highest total score advanced to the semi-final.
Semi-final
26 August — Each diver performed a front dive, a back dive, a reverse dive, an inward dive and a twisting dive. The overall difficulty degree was limited to 9.5. The 12 divers with the highest combined score from the semi-final and preliminary dives advanced to the final.
Final
26 August — Each diver performed a front dive, a back dive, a reverse dive, an inward dive and a twisting dive. There were no limitations in difficulty degree. The final ranking was determined by the combined score from the final and semi-final dives.

== Results ==
Rank	Diver	Nation	Preliminary		Semifinal				Final		
Rank	Diver	Nation	Points	Rank	Points	Rank	Total	Rank	Points	Rank	Total
1st place, gold medalist(s)	Guo Jingjing	China	319.71	3	243.06	2	562.77	2	390.09	1	633.15
2nd place, silver medalist(s)	Wu Minxia	China	306.96	6	240.39	3	547.35	5	371.61	3	612.00
3rd place, bronze medalist(s)	Yulia Pakhalina	Russia	347.04	1	237.42	4	584.46	1	373.20	2	610.62
4	Vera Ilina	Russia	311.97	4	225.90	9	537.87	7	363.21	4	589.11
5	Blythe Hartley	Canada	321.33	2	229.62	6	550.95	3	343.38	5	573.00
6	Loudy Tourky	Australia	310.65	5	227.79	7	538.44	6	339.15	6	566.94
7	Irina Lashko	Australia	303.66	8	246.51	1	550.17	4	305.46	9	551.97
8	Tania Cagnotto	Italy	298.77	10	231.15	5	529.92	9	319.23	8	550.38
9	Rachelle Kunkel	United States	294.75	12	209.76	13	504.51	12	336.96	7	546.72
10	Émilie Heymans	Canada	305.04	7	225.96	8	531.00	8	304.77	10	530.73
11	Ditte Kotzian	Germany	299.50	11	221.10	10	516.60	10	288.42	11	509.52
12	Paola Espinosa	Mexico	301.14	9	205.32	14	506.46	11	284.88	12	490.20
13	Olena Fedorova	Ukraine	290.43	13	212.85	11	503.28	13	did not advance		
14	Nóra Barta	Hungary	279.24	15	212.28	12	491.52	14	did not advance		
15	Jane Smith	Great Britain	282.90	14	200.85	16	483.75	15	did not advance		
16	Hanna Sorokina	Ukraine	269.52	16	204.63	15	474.15	16	did not advance		
17	Jenna Dreyer	South Africa	267.84	17	196.59	18	464.43	17	did not advance		
18	Juliana Veloso	Brazil	265.29	18	197.16	17	462.45	18	did not advance		
19	Anna Lindberg	Sweden	255.63	19	did not advance						
20	Jashia Luna	Mexico	252.75	20	did not advance						
21	Kimiko Soldati	United States	252.36	21	did not advance						
22	Sotiria Koutsopetrou	Greece	250.59	22	did not advance						
23	Valentina Marocchi	Italy	243.45	23	did not advance						
24	Leyre Eizaguirre	Spain	242.73	24	did not advance						
25	Angelique Rodríguez	Puerto Rico	239.19	25	did not advance						
26	Leong Mun Yee	Malaysia	227.67	26	did not advance						
27	Gracie Junita	Malaysia	223.44	27	did not advance						
28	Tracey Richardson	Great Britain	209.34	28	did not advance						
29	Iohana Cruz	Cuba	203.76	29	did not advance						
30	Katura Horton-Perinchief	Bermuda	203.58	30	did not advance						
31	Heike Fischer	Germany	199.71	31	did not advance						
32	Villő Kormos	Hungary	193.68	32	did not advance						
33	Diamantina Georgatou	Greece	157.56	33	did not advance						

== Sources ==
- "Diving Results". Athens 2004 Summer Olympics. Yahoo!.
