= 1995 FINA Diving World Cup =

International diving competition

The 1995 FINA Diving World Cup was held in Atlanta, United States from Sep 5, 1995 to Sep 9, 1995.

== Medal winners ==
=== Men ===
Event	Gold	Silver	Bronze
Springboard Finals
1 m	Yu Zhuocheng; China	Liu Ben; China	Wels Andreas; Germany
3 m	Dmitry Sautin; Russia	Xiong Ni; China	Wang Tianling; China
3 m synchro	Kevin McMahon; Brian Earley; United States	Alexander Gorski; Jan Hampel; Germany	Joel Rodriguez; Alberto Acosta; Mexico
Platform Finals
10 m	Sun Shuwei; China	Jan Hampel; Germany	Roman Volodkov; Ukraine
10 m synchro	Tian Liang; Xiao Hailiang; China	Chuck Wade; David Pichler; United States	Alexander Gorski; Heiko Meyer; Germany

=== Women ===
Event	Gold	Silver	Bronze
Springboard Finals
1 m	Vera Ilyina; Russia	Irina Lashko; Russia	Tan Shuping; China
3 m	Fu Mingxia; China	Tan Shuping; China	Vera Ilyina; Russia
3 m synchro	Guo Jingjing; Deng Ling; China	Conny Schmalfuss; Claudia Bockner; Germany	Irina Vyguzova; Natalya Chikina; Kazakhstan
Platform Finals
10 m	Chi Bin; China	Fu Mingxia; China	Vyninka Arlow; Australia
10 m synchro	Guo Jingjing; Wang Rui; China	Annika Walter; Ute Wetzig; Germany	Laura Wilkinson; Patty Amstrong; United States

Preceded by 1993 FINA Diving World Cup (Beijing, China)	1995 FINA Diving World Cup (Atlanta, USA)	Succeeded by 1997 FINA Diving World Cup (Mexico City, Mexico)
