= 2000 FINA Diving World Cup =

International diving competition

- Host city: Sydney, Australia
- Events: 10
- Website: FINA event site

The 2000 FINA Diving World Cup was held in Sydney, Australia.

== Medal winners ==
=== Men ===
Event	Gold	Silver	Bronze
Springboard Finals
1 m	Wang Tianling; China	Wang Feng; China	Dean Pullar; Australia
3 m	Dmitri Sautin; Russia	Xiao Hailiang; China	Dean Pullar; Australia
3 m synchro	Xiao Hailiang; Xiong Ni; China	Steven Barnett; Dean Pullar; Australia	Fernando Platas; Eduardo Rueda; Mexico
Platform Finals
10 m	Tian Liang; China	Dmitri Sautin; Russia	Igor Loukashin; Russia
10 m synchro	Huang Qiang; Tian Liang; China	Matthew Helm; Robert Newbery; Australia	Leon Taylor; Peter Waterfield; Great Britain

=== Women ===
Event	Gold	Silver	Bronze
Springboard Finals
1 m	Irina Lashko; Russia	Chantelle Newbery; Australia	Zhang Jing; China
3 m	Guo Jingjing; China	Fu Mingxia; China	Eryn Bulmer; Canada
3 m synchro	Vera Ilyina; Yuliya Pakhalina; Russia	Guo Jingjing; Liang Xiaoqiao; China	Hanna Sorokina; Olena Zhupina; Ukraine
Platform Finals
10 m	Li Na; China	Anne Montminy; Canada	Cai Yuyan; China
10 m synchro	Li Na; Sang Xue; China	Odile Arboles-Souchon; Julie Danaux; France	Rebecca Gilmore; Loudy Wiggins; Australia

Preceded by 1999 FINA Diving World Cup (Wellington, New Zealand)	2000 FINA Diving World Cup (Sydney, Australia)	Succeeded by 2002 FINA Diving World Cup (Seville, Spain)
