= Diving at the 2000 Summer Olympics – Women's synchronized 3 metre springboard =

Women's synchronized 3 metre springboard at the Games of the XXVII Olympiad

Medalists
1st place, gold medalist(s)		Vera Ilina, Ioulia Pakhalina	Russia
2nd place, silver medalist(s)		Fu Mingxia, Guo Jingjing	China
3rd place, bronze medalist(s)		Ganna Sorokina, Olena Zhupina	Ukraine

The women's synchronized 3 metre springboard was one of eight diving events included in the Diving at the 2000 Summer Olympics programme and one of the four new events added for the 2000 games since a change was made in 1924.

The competition was held as an outright final:

Final
23 September — Each pair of divers performed five dives freely chosen from the five diving groups, with two dives limited to a 2.0 degree of difficulty and the others without limitation. Divers could perform different dives during the same dive if both presented the same difficulty degree. The final ranking was determined by the score attained by the pair after all five dives had been performed.

== Results ==
- Values in brackets represent the aggregate score and ranking at the end of the dive.

Rank	Divers	NOC	Dive 1		Dive 2		Dive 3		Dive 4		Dive 5		
Rank	Divers	NOC	Points	Rank	Points	Rank	Points	Rank	Points	Rank	Points	Rank	Total
1	Vera Ilyina and Yuliya Pakhalina	Russia	52.80	1	55.80 (108.60)	1 (1)	74.76 (183.36)	1 (1)	73.95 (257.31)	2 (1)	75.33	1	332.64
2	Fu Mingxia and Guo Jingjing	China	48.60	3	51.60 (100.20)	2 (2)	70.20 (170.40)	2 (2)	76.50 (246.90)	1 (2)	74.70	2	321.60
3	Ganna Sorokina and Olena Zhupina	Ukraine	49.20	2	50.40 (99.60)	3 (3)	63.84 (163.44)	3 (3)	60.48 (223.92)	6 (3)	66.42	3	290.34
4	Chantelle Michell and Loudy Tourky	Australia	46.80	4	48.00 (94.80)	5 (4)	61.32 (156.12)	5 (5)	61.32 (217.44)	5 (5)	65.61	4	283.05
5	Eryn Bulmer and Blythe Hartley	Canada	45.00	8	45.00 (90.00)	7 (7)	60.75 (150.75)	6 (7)	63.00 (213.75)	4 (6)	65.25	5	279.00
6	Maria Alcalá and Jashia Luna	Mexico	46.20	5	48.60 (94.80)	4 (4)	62.16 (156.96)	4 (4)	52.08 (209.04)	7 (7)	64.80	6	273.84
7	Dörte Lindner and Conny Schmalfuss	Germany	45.60	6	47.40 (93.00)	6 (6)	58.80 (151.80)	7 (6)	66.60 (218.40)	3 (4)	45.36	8	263.76
8	Catherine Maliev-Aviolat and Jacqueline Schneider	Switzerland	45.60	6	43.20 (88.80)	8 (8)	54.00 (142.80)	8 (8)	51.24 (194.04)	8 (8)	62.16	7	256.20

== Sources ==
- Sydney Organising Committee for the Olympic Games (SOCOG) (2001). Official Report of the XXVII Olympiad - Volume Three: Results (Diving) (pdf) (in English and French). Sydney, New South Wales: Sydney Organising Committee for the Olympic Games (SOCOG). pp. 86–8. ISBN 0-9579616-1-8. OCLC 49687523.
