= Diving at the 2002 Asian Games – Women's 3 metre springboard =

Women's 3 metre springboard at the 2002 Asian Games
- Venue: Sajik Swimming Pool
- Date: 10 October 2002
- Competitors: 13 from 8 nations

Medalists
gold medal	Guo Jingjing	China
silver medal	Wu Minxia	China
bronze medal	Ryoko Nishii	Japan

The women's 3 metre springboard diving competition at the 2002 Asian Games in Busan was held on 10 October at the Sajik Swimming Pool.

== Schedule ==
All times are Korea Standard Time (UTC+09:00)

Date	Time	Event
Thursday, 10 October 2002	10:00	Preliminary
Thursday, 10 October 2002	10:00	Semifinal
Thursday, 10 October 2002	19:00	Final

== Results ==
=== Preliminary ===
Rank	Athlete	Score
1	Guo Jingjing (CHN)	349.59
2	Wu Minxia (CHN)	307.29
3	Sheila Mae Perez (PHI)	280.86
4	Kang Min-kyung (KOR)	276.72
5	Leong Mun Yee (MAS)	274.20
6	Olga Khristoforova (KAZ)	263.91
7	Hsieh Pei-hua (TPE)	263.73
8	Farah Begum Abdullah (MAS)	257.43
9	Ryoko Nishii (JPN)	257.13
10	Mai Thị Hải Yến (VIE)	238.50
11	Hoàng Thanh Trà (VIE)	236.61
12	Mayumi Higuchi (JPN)	231.27
13	Im Sung-young (KOR)	229.29

=== Semifinal ===
Rank	Athlete	Score
1	Guo Jingjing (CHN)	251.37
2	Wu Minxia (CHN)	242.25
3	Kang Min-kyung (KOR)	205.92
4	Sheila Mae Perez (PHI)	205.41
5	Olga Khristoforova (KAZ)	204.78
6	Leong Mun Yee (MAS)	203.43
7	Ryoko Nishii (JPN)	201.90
8	Hoàng Thanh Trà (VIE)	197.16
9	Farah Begum Abdullah (MAS)	194.70
10	Hsieh Pei-hua (TPE)	192.51
11	Mayumi Higuchi (JPN)	192.21
12	Mai Thị Hải Yến (VIE)	189.30

=== Final ===
Rank	Athlete	SF	Dive					Final	Total
Rank	Athlete	SF	1	2	3	4	5	Final	Total
1st place, gold medalist(s)	Guo Jingjing (CHN)	251.37	73.80	80.10	75.33	79.20	69.60	378.03	629.40
2nd place, silver medalist(s)	Wu Minxia (CHN)	242.25	73.80	74.82	70.68	75.60	72.00	366.90	609.15
3rd place, bronze medalist(s)	Ryoko Nishii (JPN)	201.90	52.56	61.20	59.64	54.60	55.89	283.89	485.79
4	Sheila Mae Perez (PHI)	205.41	53.28	52.08	61.32	55.08	50.40	272.16	477.57
5	Leong Mun Yee (MAS)	203.43	48.24	53.76	59.64	60.30	48.00	269.94	473.37
6	Kang Min-kyung (KOR)	205.92	54.72	42.93	56.28	52.08	48.51	254.52	460.44
7	Olga Khristoforova (KAZ)	204.78	47.52	56.70	49.56	32.76	60.48	247.02	451.80
8	Farah Begum Abdullah (MAS)	194.70	48.24	52.65	54.60	51.24	48.96	255.69	450.39
9	Hsieh Pei-hua (TPE)	192.51	51.84	55.08	52.08	49.56	44.25	252.81	445.32
10	Hoàng Thanh Trà (VIE)	197.16	47.52	42.84	45.36	47.88	47.52	231.12	428.28
11	Mayumi Higuchi (JPN)	192.21	50.40	52.08	31.92	48.72	50.22	233.34	425.55
12	Mai Thị Hải Yến (VIE)	189.30	38.88	32.40	50.40	55.44	46.80	223.92	413.22
