= Diving at the 2004 Summer Olympics – Women's synchronized 3 metre springboard =

Women's synchronized 3 metre springboard at the Games of the XXVIII Olympiad

Medalists
1st place, gold medalist(s)		Wu Minxia, Guo Jingjing	China
2nd place, silver medalist(s)		Vera Ilina, Ioulia Pakhalina	Russia
3rd place, bronze medalist(s)		Irina Lashko, Chantelle Newbery	Australia

The women's synchronized 3 metre springboard was one of eight diving events included in the Diving at the 2004 Summer Olympics programme.

The competition was held as an outright final:

Final
14 August — Each pair of divers performed five dives freely chosen from the five diving groups, with two dives limited to a 2.0 degree of difficulty and the others without limitation. Divers could perform different dives during the same dive if both presented the same difficulty degree. The final ranking was determined by the score attained by the pair after all five dives had been performed.

== Results ==
Rank	Nation	Dives					Total
Rank	Nation	1	2	3	4	5	Total
1st place, gold medalist(s)	China; Wu Minxia; Guo Jingjing	54.60	54.60	74.70	77.40	75.60	336.90
2nd place, silver medalist(s)	Russia; Vera Ilina; Ioulia Pakhalina	51.60	54.00	65.25	77.19	82.80	330.84
3rd place, bronze medalist(s)	Australia; Irina Lashko; Chantelle Newbery	52.20	51.00	74.70	64.80	66.60	309.30
4	Great Britain; Tandi Gerrard; Jane Smith	52.20	47.40	67.50	68.73	66.42	302.25
5	Mexico; Laura Sánchez; Paola Espinosa	51.00	51.00	64.80	61.32	68.80	286.92
6	Germany; Ditte Kotzian; Conny Schmalfuss	51.00	49.20	54.60	58.29	66.60	279.69
7	Canada; Blythe Hartley; Émilie Heymans	47.40	47.40	63.90	59.40	58.80	276.90
8	Greece; Diamantina Georgatou; Sotiria Koutsopetrou	50.40	51.60	50.40	59.13	58.80	270.33

== Sources ==
- "Diving Results". Athens 2004 Summer Olympics. Yahoo!.
- Diving. Official Report of the XXVIII Olympiad - Results
