= Georgatou =

Georgatou (Greek: Γεωργάτου) is a Greek surname. Notable people with the surname include:

- Diamantina Georgatou (born 1986), Greek Olympic diver
- Maria Georgatou (born 1984), Greek Olympic rhythmic gymnast
- Eirini Georgatou (born 1990), Greek tennis player
