= Oleg Vikulov =

Russian diver

Personal information
- Full name: Oleg Aleksandrovich Vikulov
- Nationality: Russia
- Born: 24 January 1987 (age 39) Penza, Russian SFSR
- Height: 1.60 m (5 ft 3 in)
- Weight: 56 kg (123 lb)

Sport
- Sport: Diving
- Event(s): 10 m, 10 m synchro
- Partner: Konstantin Khanbekov
Medal record
Men's diving
Representing Russia
European Aquatics Championships
Silver medal – second place	2004 Madrid	10 m synchro
Bronze medal – third place	2008 Eindhoven	10 m synchro
European Diving Championships
Silver medal – second place	2009 Turin	10 m synchro
Universiade
Gold medal – first place	2007 Bangkok	10 m synchro
Silver medal – second place	2007 Bangkok	Team
Bronze medal – third place	2007 Bangkok	10 m platform

Oleg Aleksandrovich Vikulov (Russian: Олег Александрович Викулов; born January 24, 1987, in Penza) is a Russian platform diver. He won a gold medal, along with his partner Konstantin Khanbekov, for the men's synchronized platform at the 2008 FINA Diving World Cup series in Tijuana, Mexico, in addition to their silver in Nanjing, China, and a fourth-place finish in Sheffield, England. He also captured two medals (gold and bronze) in the individual and synchronized platform at the 2007 Summer Universiade in Bangkok, Thailand.

Vikulov represented Russia at the 2008 Summer Olympics in Beijing, where he competed for the men's platform event, along with his teammate Gleb Galperin (who eventually won the bronze medal in the final). He placed twenty-seventh out of thirty divers in the preliminary round by nine points behind Malaysia's Bryan Nickson Lomas, with a total score of 375.40 after six successive attempts.
