= Huang Qiang =

Huang Qiang may refer to:

- Huang Qiang (politician) (born 1963), Chinese politician
- Huang Qiang (diver) (born 1982), Chinese diver

== See also ==
- Huang Qian (born 1986), Chinese chess player
