= Shi Lei =

Shi Lei is the name of:

- Shi Lei (diver), see 1997 FINA Diving World Cup#Women
- Shi Lei (footballer), see Dalian Shide F.C.
- Shi Lei (actor), Chinese actor
- Seok Ha-jung (born Shi Lei, 1985), South Korean table tennis player
- Tatsuo Nomura (born Shi Lei, 1986), Japanese software developer
- Shi Lei, the defendant in United States v. Shi, a 2008 piracy case

Shi Lei was also the name of Shi Zhiyong (weightlifter, born 1993).
