= Diving at the 2001 Summer Universiade =

The Diving competition in the 2001 Summer Universiade were held in Beijing, People's Republic of China.

== Medal overview ==
=== Men's events ===
Event	Gold	Silver	Bronze
1 metre Springboard	Wang Tianling (CHN)	Wang Feng (CHN)	Imre Lengyel (HUN)
3 metre Springboard	Wang Tianling (CHN)	Fernando Platas (MEX)	Ken Terauchi (JPN)
10 metre Platform	Tian Liang (CHN)	José Antonio Guerra (CUB)	Roman Volod'kov (UKR)
Synchronized Springboard	Peng Bo & Wang Kenan (CHN)	Joel Rodríguez & Fernando Platas (MEX)	Stephan Arehns & Tobias Schellenberg (GER)
Synchronized Platform	Tian Liang & Hu Jia (CHN)	Pak Yong-Ryong & Choe Hyong-Gil (PRK)	Erick Fornaris & José Antonio Guerra (CUB)
Team Trophy	China (CHN)	Mexico (MEX)	United States (USA)

=== Women's events ===
Event	Gold	Silver	Bronze
1 metre Springboard	Guo Jingjing (CHN)	Li Rongjuan (CHN)	Natalya Umyskova (RUS)
3 metre Springboard	Guo Jingjing (CHN)	Li Rongjuan (CHN)	Natalya Umyskova (RUS)
10 metre Platform	Wang Rui (CHN)	Cai Yuyan (CHN)	Ri Ok-Rim (PRK)
Synchronized Springboard	Yang Lan & Li Rongjuan (CHN)	Ganna Sorokina & Olena Zhupina (UKR) Ditte Kotzian & Conny Schmalfuss (GER)	
Synchronized Platform	Guo Jingjing & Cai Yuyan (CHN)	Dolores Sáez de Ibarra & Leire Santos (ESP)	Takiri Miziyaki & Emi Otsuki (JPN)
Team Trophy	China (CHN)	Ukraine (UKR)	North Korea (PRK)

== Medal table ==
* Host nation (China)

Rank	Nation	Gold	Silver	Bronze	Total
1	China*	12	4	0	16
2	Mexico	0	3	0	3
3	Ukraine	0	2	1	3
4	North Korea	0	1	2	3
5	Cuba	0	1	1	2
5	Germany	0	1	1	2
7	Spain	0	1	0	1
8	Japan	0	0	2	2
8	Russia	0	0	2	2
10	Hungary	0	0	1	1
10	United States	0	0	1	1
Totals (11 entries)		12	13	11	36
