= Anton Zakharov =

Ukrainian Olympic diver

Personal information
- Born: 13 February 1986 (age 40) Zaporizhzhia, Soviet Union

Sport
- Sport: Diving
Medal record
Representing Ukraine
World Championships
Silver medal – second place	2003 Barcelona	10 m synchro
Bronze medal – third place	2001 Fukuoka	10 m synchro
European Championships
Gold medal – first place	2002 Berlin	10 m synchro
Gold medal – first place	2004 Madrid	10 m platform
Gold medal – first place	2004 Madrid	10 m synchro
Bronze medal – third place	2008 Eindhoven	3 m synchro
Universiade
Bronze medal – third place	2007 Bangkok	Team
Bronze medal – third place	2007 Bangkok	3 m synchro
European Junior Diving Championships
Gold medal – first place	2000 Istanbul	3 m springboard
Gold medal – first place	2000 Istanbul	10 m synchro
Silver medal – second place	2003 Edinburgh	10 m synchro
Bronze medal – third place	2000 Istanbul	1 m springboard

Anton Zakharov (born 13 February 1986) is a Ukrainian diver. He is competed for Ukraine at the 2004, 2008 and 2012 Summer Olympics.

== Career ==
At the 2004 Summer Olympics he competed in both the men's individual 10 m platform diving and the synchronised 10 m platform diving, while at the 2008 and 2012 Summer Olympics he only competed in the individual events. His best Olympic result was fourth in the synchronised diving with Roman Volodkov in 2004.
