= Wang Rui =

Wang Rui may refer to:

- Wang Rui (chess player) (born 1978), Chinese chess grandmaster
- Wang Rui (figure skater), Chinese ice dancer
- Wang Rui (table tennis), Chinese para table tennis player
- Wang Rui (curler) (born 1995), Chinese curler
- Wang Rui (pharmacologist), Chinese pharmacologist and professor
- Wang Rui (diver), competed in the 1997 FINA Diving World Cup

== See also ==
- Wang Ruei (born 1993), Taiwanese footballer
