= Voloshchenko =

Voloshchenko is a Ukrainian surname. Notable people with the surname include:

- Mariya Voloshchenko (born 1989), Ukrainian diver
