= 1997 FINA Diving World Cup =

World diving championships

- Website: FINA event site

The 1997 FINA Diving World Cup was held in Mexico City, Mexico from September 10, 1997 to September 14, 1997.

== Medal winners ==
=== Men ===
Event	Gold	Silver	Bronze
Springboard Finals
1 m	Liu Ben; China	Troy Dumais; United States	Zhou Yilin; China
3 m	Dmitry Sautin; Russia	Zhou Yilin; China	Xu Hao; China
3 m synchro	Xu Hao; Gong Ming; China	Dean Pullar; Shannon Roy; Australia	Hloger Schlepps; Alexander Mesch; Germany
Platform Finals
10 m	Dmitry Sautin; Russia	Fernando Platas; Mexico	Xu Hao; China
10 m synchro	Huang Qiang; Li Chengwei; China	Heiko Meyer; Alexander Gorski; Germany	Alberto Acosta; Francisco Perez; Mexico

=== Women ===
Event	Gold	Silver	Bronze
Springboard Finals
1 m	Zhang Jing; China	Tan Shuping; China	Doerte Lindner; Germany
3 m	Eryn Bulmer; Canada	Yuliya Pakhalina; Russia	Shi Lei; China
3 m synchro	Shi Lei; Zhang Jing; China	Simona Koch; Doerte Lindner; Germany	Dolores Saez de Ibarra; Julia Cruz; Spain
Platform Finals
10 m	Myriam Boileau; Canada	Wang Rui; China	Chi Bin; China
10 m synchro	Chi Bin; Wang Rui; China	Anke Piper; Ute Wetzig; Germany	Kristin Link; Lindsay Long; United States

Preceded by 1995 FINA Diving World Cup (Atlanta, USA)	1997 FINA Diving World Cup (Mexico City, Mexico)	Succeeded by 1999 FINA Diving World Cup (Wellington, New Zealand)
