= Kim Yeo-yeong =

South Korean diver

Personal information
- Nationality: South Korean
- Born: 26 June 1979 (age 45)

Sport
- Sport: Diving

Kim Yeo-yeong (born 26 June 1979) is a South Korean diver. She competed in the women's 10 metre platform event at the 1996 Summer Olympics.
