= Yevgeniya Olshevskaya =

Russian diver (born 1978)

Personal information
- Nationality: Russian
- Born: 7 September 1978 (age 47) Leningrad, Soviet Union

Sport
- Sport: Diving
Medal record
Women's diving
Representing Russia
World Championships
Silver medal – second place	2001 Fukuoka	10 m synchro
Bronze medal – third place	2003 Barcelona	10 m synchro
European Championships
Gold medal – first place	1999 Istanbul	10 m synchro
Silver medal – second place	2000 Helsinki	10 m synchro
Bronze medal – third place	2002 Berlin	10 m synchro

Yevgeniya Olshevskaya (born 7 September 1978) is a Russian diver. She competed in two events at the 2000 Summer Olympics.
