= Rachelle Kunkel =

American diver

Personal information
- Born: May 1, 1978 (age 48) Salt Lake City, Utah, U.S.

Sport
- Country: United States
- Sport: Diving

Rachelle Kunkel (born May 1, 1978) is an American diver. She competed at the 2004 Summer Olympics in Athens, in the women's 3 metre springboard.
