= Sotiria Koutsopetrou =

Greek diver (born 1979)

Personal information
- Native name: Σωτηρία Κουτσοπέτρου
- Nationality: Greek
- Born: 19 August 1979 (age 45); Athens, Attica, Greece
- Height: 163 cm (5 ft 4 in)
- Weight: 47 kg (104 lb)

Sport
- Sport: Diving

Sotiria Koutsopetrou (Greek: Σωτηρία Κουτσοπέτρου; born 19 August 1979) is a former Greek diver. At the 2000 Summer Olympics, Koutsopetrou competed in the 3 metre springboard event. She also competed in the synchronised 3 metre springboard, along with Diamantina Georgatou, and the 3 metre springboard events at the 2004 Summer Olympics in her hometown of Athens.
