= Kostyantyn Milyayev =

Ukrainian diver

Personal information
- Full name: Kostyantyn Serhiyovych Milyayev
- Nationality: Ukrainian
- Born: 23 October 1987 (age 38) Novokuznetsk, Russian SFSR, Soviet Union
- Height: 1.73 m (5 ft 8 in)
- Weight: 65 kg (143 lb)

Sport
- Sport: Diving
- Event: Platform
- Club: Ukraïna Mykolaïv (UKR)
Medal record
Men's diving
Representing Ukraine
European Championships
Bronze medal – third place	2006 Budapest	10 m platform
Universiade
Gold medal – first place	2009 Belgrade	10 m platform
Bronze medal – third place	2007 Bangkok	Team
European Junior Championships
Gold medal – first place	2004 Aachen	10 m platform
Gold medal – first place	2005 Elektrostal	10 m platform
Silver medal – second place	2001 Malta	3 m springboard

Kostyantyn Serhiyovych Milyayev (Ukrainian: Костянтин Сергійович Міляєв; born 23 October 1987 in Novokuznetsk, Russian SFSR) is a Ukrainian platform diver. Milyayev represented Ukraine at the 2008 Summer Olympics in Beijing, where he competed for the men's platform event. He placed twentieth out of thirty divers in the preliminary round, with a total score of 410.20 points after six successive attempts.
