= Christina Loukas =

American diver

Personal information
- Born: December 19, 1985 (age 40) Riverwoods, Illinois, U.S.
- Height: 5 ft 4 in (163 cm)

Sport
- Country: United States
- Event: 3-meter springboard
- College team: Indiana Hoosiers
Medal record
Women's diving
Representing United States
Summer Universiade
Silver medal – second place	2007 Bangkok	3 m springboard
Bronze medal – third place	2007 Bangkok	3 m synchro
Bronze medal – third place	2007 Bangkok	Team

Christina Loukas (born December 19, 1985) is an American diver. She competes in the 3 meter springboard event.

Loukas is of Greek origin, and was born and grew up in Riverwoods, Illinois, where she studied gymnastics, swimming, and diving from an early age, before switching to diving exclusively at age twelve. She attended Deerfield High School in Deerfield, Illinois and competed in the off season with the Coho Swim Club. She later moved to Bloomington, Indiana and lives in The Woodlands, Texas.

== Collegiate career ==
She attended Indiana University Bloomington and dived for the Indiana Hoosiers, with whom she was an eight-time NCAA All-American. Loukas won all three diving events at the conference championships, and was one of only four Big Ten divers to accomplish that feat. She graduated in May 2009.

== Competitive Diving ==
Loukas placed fourth at the 2008 FINA Swimming World Cup. She competed in the 2008 Summer Olympics in Beijing, China, placing ninth, and in the 2012 Summer Olympics in London, England, placing eighth.

== See also ==
- Diving at the 2008 Summer Olympics – Women's 3 metre springboard
- Diving at the 2012 Summer Olympics - Women's 3 metre springboard
