= Im Yun-ji =

South Korean diver

Personal information
- Nationality: South Korean
- Born: 12 March 1981 (age 44)

Sport
- Sport: Diving

Im Yun-ji (born 12 March 1981) is a South Korean diver. She competed in the women's 10 metre platform event at the 1996 Summer Olympics.
