= Radoslava Georgieva =

Bulgarian diver

Personal information
- Nationality: Bulgarian
- Born: 1 April 1976 (age 48); Sofia, Bulgaria

Sport
- Sport: Diving

Radoslava Georgieva (born 1 April 1976) is a Bulgarian diver. She competed in the women's 10 metre platform event at the 1996 Summer Olympics.
