= Olena Zhupina =

Ukrainian diver (born 1973)

Personal information
- Born: 23 August 1973 (age 52) Zaporizhzhia, Ukrainian SSR, Soviet Union

Sport
- Partner: Ganna Sorokina
Medal record
Women's diving
Representing Ukraine
Olympic Games
Bronze medal – third place	2000 Sydney	3 m synchro
World Championships
Gold medal – first place	1998 Perth	10 m platform
Gold medal – first place	1998 Perth	10 m synchro
European Championships
Gold medal – first place	1999 Istanbul	10 m platform
Gold medal – first place	1999 Istanbul	3 m synchro
Silver medal – second place	2002 Berlin	10 m synchro
Silver medal – second place	2004 Madrid	10 m platform
Bronze medal – third place	1993 Sheffield	10 m platform
Bronze medal – third place	2000 Helsinki	10 m platform
Bronze medal – third place	2000 Helsinki	3 m synchro
Bronze medal – third place	2000 Helsinki	10 m synchro
Summer Universiade
Silver medal – second place	2001 Beijing	Team
Silver medal – second place	2001 Beijing	Women's synchro springboard
Goodwill Games
Silver medal – second place	1998 New York	10 m synchro
Bronze medal – third place	2001 Brisbane	3 m synchro
World Cup
Silver medal – second place	1999 Wellington	10 m platform
Bronze medal – third place	1999 Wellington	3 m synchro
Bronze medal – third place	2000 Sydney	3 m synchro
Representing Soviet Union
European Junior Diving Championships
Silver medal – second place	1991 Brasschaat	10 m platform

Olena Zhupina (Ukrainian: Олена Жупіна, (born 23 August 1973) is a Ukrainian diver.

== Career ==
She who won the bronze medal with Ganna Sorokina in the Women's 3m Synchronized Springboard competition at the 2000 Summer Olympics in Sydney, Australia. Zhupina also competed in the 1996 Summer Olympics and the 2004 Summer Olympics.

She has 28 medals total, 13 of which are gold. In April 2002, she took the first place in Stockholm, Sweden, in the European Champions Cup in synchronous springboard diving. In 2001, she participated at the 4th SuperFinal of the Grand Prix which was held in Athens, Greece.
