= Malaysia at the 2004 Summer Olympics =

- IOC code: MAS
- NOC: Olympic Council of Malaysia
- Website: www.olympic.org.my (in English)

in Athens
- Competitors: 26 in 11 sports
- Flag bearer: Bryan Nickson Lomas
- Medals: Gold 0 Silver 0 Bronze 0 Total 0

Summer Olympics appearances (overview)
- 1956; 1960; 1964; 1968; 1972; 1976; 1980; 1984; 1988; 1992; 1996; 2000; 2004; 2008; 2012; 2016; 2020; 2024

Other related appearances
- North Borneo (1956)

Malaysia competed at the 2004 Summer Olympics in Athens, Greece, from 13 to 29 August 2004. This was the nation's twelfth appearance at the Olympics, although it had previously competed in two other games under the name Malaya. Malaysia, however, did not participate at the 1980 Summer Olympics in Moscow, because of its partial support to the United States boycott.

With the absence of the men's field hockey team, Olympic Council of Malaysia sent the nation's smallest delegation to the Games since the 1992 Summer Olympics in Barcelona. A total of 26 athletes, 18 men and 8 women, competed in 11 sports. Nine Malaysian athletes had previously competed in Sydney, including badminton tandem Choong Tan Fook and Lee Wan Wah, race walker Yuan Yufang, and US-based swimmers Alex Lim and Allen Ong. Being the youngest ever athlete of the team, fourteen-year-old diver Bryan Nickson Lomas was appointed by the council to become the nation's flag bearer in the opening ceremony. Malaysia also marked its official debut in archery.

Malaysia failed to win a single Olympic medal for the second consecutive time since the 1996 Summer Olympics in Atlanta, where badminton pair Cheah Soon Kit and Yap Kim Hock claimed a silver in the men's doubles.

== Archery ==
One Malaysian archer qualified for the women's individual archery.

Athlete	Event	Ranking round		Round of 64	Round of 32	Round of 16	Quarterfinals	Semifinals	Final / BM	
Athlete	Event	Score	Seed	Opposition Score	Opposition Score	Opposition Score	Opposition Score	Opposition Score	Opposition Score	Rank
Mon Redee Sut Txi	Women's individual	626	32	Bolotova (RUS); L 143–154	Did not advance					

== Athletics ==
Malaysian athletes have so far achieved qualifying standards in the following athletics events (up to a maximum of 3 athletes in each event at the 'A' Standard, and 1 at the 'B' Standard).

Key

- Note–Ranks given for track events are within the athlete's heat only
- Q = Qualified for the next round
- q = Qualified for the next round as a fastest loser or, in field events, by position without achieving the qualifying target
- NR = National record
- N/A = Round not applicable for the event
- Bye = Athlete not required to compete in round

Men

Athlete	Event	Heat		Quarterfinal		Semifinal		Final	
Athlete	Event	Result	Rank	Result	Rank	Result	Rank	Result	Rank
Nazmizan Muhammad	200 m	21.24	7	Did not advance					

Women

Athlete	Event	Final	
Athlete	Event	Result	Rank
Yuan Yufang	20 km walk	1:36:34	35

== Badminton ==
Men

Athlete	Event	Round of 32	Round of 16	Quarterfinal	Semifinal	Final / BM	
Athlete	Event	Opposition Score	Opposition Score	Opposition Score	Opposition Score	Opposition Score	Rank
Muhammad Roslin Hashim	Singles	Kuncoro (INA); L 15–6, 9–15, 15–8	Did not advance				
Lee Chong Wei	Singles	Ng W (HKG); W 15–3, 15–13	Chen H (CHN); L 11–15, 15–3, 12–15	Did not advance			
Wong Choong Hann	Singles	Wacha (POL); W 15–1, 15–5	Hidayat (INA); L 15–11, 7–15, 9–15	Did not advance			
Chan Chong Ming; Chew Choon Eng	Doubles	Patis / Velkos (GRE); W 15–1, 15–4	Sang Y / Zheng B (CHN); L 11–15, 7–15	Did not advance			
Choong Tan Fook; Lee Wan Wah	Doubles	Bye	Panvisvas / Teerawiwatana (THA); W 15–10, 15–13	Lee D-S / Yoo Y-S (KOR); L 15–11, 11–15, 9–15	Did not advance		

Women

Athlete	Event	Round of 32	Round of 16	Quarterfinal	Semifinal	Final / BM	
Athlete	Event	Opposition Score	Opposition Score	Opposition Score	Opposition Score	Opposition Score	Rank
Chin Eei Hui; Wong Pei Tty	Doubles	Yamada / Yamamoto (JPN); W 15–7, 15–9	Gao L / Huang S (CHN); L 12–15, 8–15	Did not advance			

== Cycling ==
=== Track ===
Sprint

Athlete	Event	Qualification		Round 1	Repechage 1	Round 2	Repechage 2	Quarterfinals	Semifinals	Final	
Athlete	Event	Time Speed (km/h)	Rank	Opposition Time Speed (km/h)	Opposition Time Speed (km/h)	Opposition Time Speed (km/h)	Opposition Time Speed (km/h)	Opposition Time Speed (km/h)	Opposition Time Speed (km/h)	Opposition Time Speed (km/h)	Rank
Josiah Ng	Men's sprint	10.515; 68.473	11	Villanueva (ESP); L	Yang H-C (KOR); Jeřábek (SVK); W 11.006; 65.418	Bayley (AUS); L	Edgar (GBR); Eadie (AUS); L	Did not advance		9th place final Villanueva (ESP); Mulder (NED); Eadie (AUS); L	11

Keirin

Athlete	Event	1st round	Repechage	2nd round	Final
Athlete	Event	Rank	Rank	Rank	Rank
Josiah Ng	Men's keirin	5 R	2 Q	2 Q	6

== Diving ==
Malaysian divers qualified for four individual spots at the 2004 Olympic Games.

Men

Athlete	Event	Preliminaries		Semifinals		Final	
Athlete	Event	Points	Rank	Points	Rank	Points	Rank
Bryan Nickson Lomas	10 m platform	407.13	19	Did not advance			

Women

Athlete	Event	Preliminaries		Semifinals		Final	
Athlete	Event	Points	Rank	Points	Rank	Points	Rank
Gracie Junita	3 m springboard	223.44	27	Did not advance			
Leong Mun Yee	3 m springboard	227.67	26	Did not advance			
Leong Mun Yee	10 m platform	273.33	21	Did not advance			

== Gymnastics ==
=== Artistic ===
Men

Athlete	Event	Qualification								Final							
Athlete	Event	Apparatus						Total	Rank	Apparatus						Total	Rank
Athlete	Event	F	PH	R	V	PB	HB	Total	Rank	F	PH	R	V	PB	HB	Total	Rank
Ng Shu Wai	All-around	9.300	9.250	9.162	9.412	8.300	9.225	54.561	38	Did not advance							

== Sailing ==
Malaysian sailors have qualified one boat for each of the following events.

Open

Athlete	Event	Race											Net points	Final rank
Athlete	Event	1	2	3	4	5	6	7	8	9	10	M*	Net points	Final rank
Kevin Lim Leong Keat	Laser	23	21	33	17	~~OCS~~	35	26	21	18	19	7	220	24

M = Medal race; OCS = On course side of the starting line; DSQ = Disqualified; DNF = Did not finish; DNS= Did not start; RDG = Redress given

== Shooting ==
Two Malaysian shooters qualified to compete in the following events:

Men

Athlete	Event	Qualification		Final	
Athlete	Event	Points	Rank	Points	Rank
Ricky Teh Chee Fei	Skeet	113	40	Did not advance	
Bernard Yeoh Cheng Han	Trap	107	34	Did not advance	

== Swimming ==
Malaysian swimmers earned qualifying standards in the following events (up to a maximum of 2 swimmers in each event at the A-standard time, and 1 at the B-standard time):

Men

Athlete	Event	Heat		Semifinal		Final	
Athlete	Event	Time	Rank	Time	Rank	Time	Rank
Alex Lim	100 m backstroke	55.22 NR	8 Q	56.08	15	Did not advance	
Alex Lim	200 m backstroke	2:02.67	21	Did not advance			
Allen Ong	50 m freestyle	23.52	=46	Did not advance			
Allen Ong	100 m freestyle	52.04	50	Did not advance			
Saw Yi Khy	1500 m freestyle	16:06.38	32	—N/a		Did not advance	

Women

Athlete	Event	Heat		Semifinal		Final	
Athlete	Event	Time	Rank	Time	Rank	Time	Rank
Siow Yi Ting	100 m breaststroke	1:13.30	36	Did not advance			
Siow Yi Ting	200 m breaststroke	2:33.79	21	Did not advance			
Siow Yi Ting	200 m individual medley	2:19.52	22	Did not advance			

== Taekwondo ==
Malaysia has qualified a single taekwondo jin.

Athlete	Event	Round of 16	Quarterfinals	Semifinals	Repechage 1	Repechage 2	Final / BM	
Athlete	Event	Opposition Result	Opposition Result	Opposition Result	Opposition Result	Opposition Result	Opposition Result	Rank
Elaine Teo	Women's −49 kg	Carías (GUA); L 4–4 SUP	Did not advance					

== Weightlifting ==
Malaysia has qualified a single weightlifter.

Athlete	Event	Snatch		Clean & Jerk		Total	Rank
Athlete	Event	Result	Rank	Result	Rank	Total	Rank
Mohd Faizal Baharom	Men's −56 kg	110	11	~~132.5~~	DNF	110	DNF

== See also ==
- Malaysia at the 2002 Asian Games
- Malaysia at the 2004 Summer Paralympics
