= Xu Mian (diver) =

Chinese diver

Personal information
- Native name: 许冕
- Nationality: Chinese
- Born: 21 February 1987 (age 39) Yangzhou, China
- Education: Guangling primary school, Yangzhou

Sport
- Country: China
- Sport: Diving
- Event: 10 m
Medal record
World Championships
Gold medal – first place	2001 Fukuoka	10 m

Xu Mian (simplified Chinese: 许冕; traditional Chinese: 許冕; pinyin: Xǚ Miǎn; born 21 February 1987 in Yangzhou) is a former female Chinese diver specializing in 10 metre platform event, the goldlist at 2001 World Championships in Fukuoka, Japan.
