= Leire Santos =

Spanish diver

Personal information
- Full name: Leire Santos Sanz
- Nationality: Spanish
- Born: 3 January 1979 (age 47) Madrid, Spain

Sport
- Sport: Diving
Medal record
Women's diving
Representing Spain
European Championships
| Silver medal – second place | 2004 Madrid | 10 m synchro |
Summer Universiade
| Silver medal – second place | 2001 Beijing | 10 m synchro |

Leire Santos (born 3 January 1979) is a Spanish diver. She competed at the 2000 Summer Olympics and the 2004 Summer Olympics.
