= Rachel Bugg =

Australian diver

Personal information
- Nickname: Buggie
- Nationality: Australian
- Born: 7 March 1989 (age 37) Belair, South Australia
- Height: 159 cm (5 ft 3 in) (2012)
- Weight: 56 kg (8 st 11 lb; 123 lb) (2012)

Sport
- Country: Australia
- Sport: Diving
- Event: 10m synchro
- Club: Diving South Australia

Rachel Bugg (born 7 March 1989) is an Australian diver. She represented Australia at the 2012 Summer Olympics in the 10m women's synchronised platform diving event with Loudy Wiggins.

== Personal ==
Nicknamed Buggie, Bugg was born on 7 March 1989 in Belair, South Australia. She is originally from Adelaide, South Australia. She attended Mercedes College. In 2008, following retirement from diving, she worked on a diploma of beauty therapy. She moved to Brisbane in 2010 in order to improve her diving training and continued to live and train there in 2012.

Bugg is 158 centimetres (62 in) tall.

== Diving ==
Bugg dives in the 10m synchronised platform diving and 10-metre individual event. She started participating in diving when she was twelve years old, switching sports from gymnastics. When she first started in the sport, she did not enjoy it. She is a member of Diving South Australia's diving club and has a diving scholarship with the Australian Institute of Sport. As of 2012, she is trained by Hui Tong in Brisbane at the Brisbane Aquatic Centre.

Bugg retired from competing prior to the start of the 2008 Summer Olympics due to injury, following the 2008 Australian national diving championships. In her first dive of the competition, she injured her right triceps with a third-grade tear. She resumed diving in the middle of 2009.

Bugg competes internationally in the FINA Grand Prix 10m platform diving events, both as an individual and in synchronised diving with a partner; there are six Grand Prix events scheduled annually. Some notable finishes in 2010 individual events include tenth in Fort Lauderdale in the US and seventh in Madrid; in 2011 her finishes included twelfth in Bolzano, Italy, and fifth in Madrid; and in 2012 she finished fourth at Rostock, Germany. In synchronised diving in 2010, she competed with dive partner Hannah Thek, and finished fifth in Fort Lauderdale in the US; in 2011, they had two second-place finishes: one in Bolzano and the other in Moscow. In 2012, she partnered with Loudy Wiggins, and the pair placed fourth in Fort Lauderdale and second in Montreal.

Bugg was selected to represent Australia at the 2012 Summer Olympics in the 10m women's synchronised platform diving event with dive partner Wiggins. Her spot to London was finalised in May 2012. She missed an individual spot after the national trials where she vied for a spot against thirteen other women. Going into the 2012 Olympics, she had ten training sessions a week, with each session lasting three hours.

At the 2012 Summer Olympics, she and Wiggins finished in 4th place.

At the 2014 Commonwealth Games, she competed in the individual 10 m platform, and the 10 m platform synchronised with Melissa Wu.
