= Diving at the 2007 Summer Universiade =

The Diving competition in the 2007 Summer Universiade were held in Bangkok, Thailand.

== Medal overview ==
=== Men's events ===
Event	Gold	Silver	Bronze
1 metre Springboard	Zhang Xinhua (CHN)	Luo Yutong (CHN)	Yuriy Shlyakhov (UKR)
3 metre Springboard	Peng Bo (CHN)	Luo Yutong (CHN)	Rommel Pacheco (MEX)
10 metre Platform	Hu Jia (CHN)	Wang Liang (CHN)	Oleg Vikulov (RUS)
Synchronized Springboard	Peng Bo & Wang Kenan (CHN)	Aleksandr Gorshkov & Artem Lvov (RUS)	Dmytro Lysenko & Anton Zakharov (UKR)
Synchronized Platform	Konstantin Khanbekov & Oleg Vikulov (RUS)	Zhou Xin & Wang Liang (CHN)	Pak Yong-Ryong & Kim Chol-Jin (PRK)
Team Trophy	China (CHN); Zhang Xinhua; Luo Yutong; Peng Bo; Hu Jia; Wang Liang; Wang Kenan; Zhou Xin	Russia (RUS); Oleg Vikulov; Aleksandr Gorshkov; Artem Lvov; Konstantin Khanbekov; Sergey Goltsev; Alexey Kravchenko	Ukraine (UKR); Yuriy Shlyakhov; Illya Kvasha; Oleksiy Pryhorov; Dmytro Lysenko; Anton Zakharov; Kostyantyn Milyayev

=== Women's events ===
Event	Gold	Silver	Bronze
1 metre Springboard	Noemi Batki (ITA); Mariya Voloshchenko (UKR)	not awarded	Mary Yarrison (USA)
3 metre Springboard	Li Ting (CHN)	Christina Loukas (USA)	Paola Espinosa (MEX)
10 metre Platform	Lao Lishi (CHN)	Paola Espinosa (MEX)	Mai Nakagawa (JPN)
Synchronized Springboard	Paola Espinosa & Tatiana Ortiz (MEX)	Li Ting & Hou Yuanyuan (CHN)	Christina Loukas & Amanda Miller (USA)
Synchronized Platform	Paola Espinosa & Tatiana Ortiz (MEX)	Hong In-Sun & Choe Kum-Hui (PRK)	Misako Yamashita & Mai Nakagawa (JPN)
Team Trophy	Mexico (MEX); Paola Espinosa; Tatiana Ortiz; Laura Sánchez	China (CHN); Li Ting; Lao Lishi; Hou Yuanyuan; Yao Xinyi; Yang Yuting	United States (USA); Mary Yarrison; Christina Loukas; Amanda Miller; Sarah Chzanowski; Cassandra Cardinell; Jessica Livingston; Heather Bounds

== Medal table ==
* Host nation (Thailand)

Rank	Nation	Gold	Silver	Bronze	Total
1	China	7	6	0	13
2	Mexico	3	1	2	6
3	Russia	1	2	1	4
4	Ukraine	1	0	3	4
5	Italy	1	0	0	1
6	United States	0	1	3	4
7	North Korea	0	1	1	2
8	Japan	0	0	2	2
Totals (8 entries)		13	11	12	36
