= Jacqueline Schneider =

Swiss diver

Personal information
- Nationality: Swiss
- Born: 12 August 1972 (age 52)

Sport
- Sport: Diving

Jacqueline Schneider (born 12 August 1972) is a Swiss diver. She competed in the women's synchronized 3 metre springboard event at the 2000 Summer Olympics.
