= Roman Volod'kov =

Ukrainian diver

Personal information
- Born: 12 August 1973 (age 52) Zaporizhzhia, Ukrainian SSR, Soviet Union
Medal record
Men's diving
Representing Ukraine
World Championships
Silver medal – second place	2003 Barcelona	Platform synchro
Bronze medal – third place	2001 Fukuoka	Platform synchro
FINA Diving World Cup
Bronze medal – third place	1995 Atlanta	10 m platform
European Championships
Gold medal – first place	2002 Berlin	Platform synchro
Gold medal – first place	2004 Madrid	Platform synchro
Silver medal – second place	2000 Helsinki	Platform synchro
Bronze medal – third place	1995 Vienna	3 m springboard
Bronze medal – third place	1999 Istanbul	10 m platform
Bronze medal – third place	2004 Madrid	10 m platform
Universiade
Bronze medal – third place	1993 Buffalo	3 m springboard
Bronze medal – third place	1993 Buffalo	10 m platform
Bronze medal – third place	2001 Beijing	10 m platform

Roman Mykhailovych Volod'kov (Ukrainian: Роман Михайлович Володьков; born 12 August 1973) is a retired diver from Ukraine, who represented his native country in three consecutive Summer Olympics, starting in 1996. He won a bronze medal in the synchronized 10m platform event at the 2001 World Aquatics Championships and a silver medal in the same event at the 2003 World Aquatics Championships.
