= Kimiko Soldati =

American diver

Personal information
- Born: April 10, 1974 (age 52) Longmont, Colorado, U.S.

Sport
- Country: United States
- Sport: Diving

Kimiko Soldati (born April 10, 1974) is an American diver. She competed at the 2004 Summer Olympics in Athens, in the women's 3 meter springboard. Soldati was born in Longmont, Colorado.
