= Huang Qiang (diver) =

Malaysian diver

Yu Zhuocheng
Personal information
- Born: 11 April 1982 (age 44) Guangdong, China

Sport
- Country: People's Republic of China
- Event: 10m platform
Medal record
Asian Games
Silver medal – second place	1998 Bangkok	Men 10m Platform

Huang Qiang (simplified Chinese: 黄强; traditional Chinese: 黃强; pinyin: Huáng Qiáng; born 11 April 1982) is a Chinese-born Malaysian diver. He originally competed for the Chinese team and won a silver medal at the 1998 Asian Games as a sixteen-year-old. At the 2000 FINA Diving World Cup, Huang Qiang and his partner Tian Liang won the gold medal at the 10m synchronised event and the pair was viewed as a strong contender for gold at the 2000 Summer Olympics but Huang Qiang withdrew from the competition due to a back injury. His replacement Hu Jia and Tian Liang won silver. After his injury, Huang began a new career as a coach and eventually worked for the Malaysian national team. In 2011 he returned to the competition and received Malaysian citizenship which allowed him to qualify for the 2012 Summer Olympics under the Malaysian flag. In London, he competed in the synchronised 3 metre springboard (with partner Bryan Nickson Lomas) and 3 m springboard events. In 2017, Huang was charged with raping a Malaysian diver but he was subsequently acquitted and discharged.
