= Ganna Sorokina =

Ukrainian diver (born 1976)

Personal information
- Nationality: Ukraine
- Born: March 31, 1976 (age 50) Zaporizhzhia, Ukraine

Sport
- Partner: Olena Zhupina
Medal record
Women's diving
Representing Ukraine
Olympic Games
Bronze medal – third place	2000 Sydney	3 m synchro
European Championships
Gold medal – first place	1999 Istanbul	3 m synchro
Bronze medal – third place	2000 Helsinki	3 m synchro
Summer Universiade
Silver medal – second place	2001 Beijing	Team
Silver medal – second place	2001 Beijing	3 m synchro
World Cup
Bronze medal – third place	1999 Wellington	3 m synchro
Bronze medal – third place	2000 Sydney	3 m synchro
European Junior Diving Championships
Gold medal – first place	1994 Pardubice	1 m springboard
Gold medal – first place	1994 Pardubice	3 m springboard
Representing Soviet Union
World Junior Championships
Gold medal – first place	1991 Örebro	1 m springboard
Bronze medal – third place	1991 Örebro	3 m springboard

Ganna Sorokina (Ukrainian: Ганна Сорокіна; born 31 March 1976 in Zaporizhzhia) is a Ukrainian diver.

== Career ==
She won the bronze medal with Olena Zhupina in the women's 3m synchronized springboard competition. Sorokina also competed in the individual 3m springboard competitions at the 2000 Summer Olympics and the 2004 Summer Olympics. Ganna took 11th place at the 2000 Olympics with a score of 512.97 and a 16th-place finish for the 2004 Athens Games.
