= Mariya Voloshchenko =

Ukrainian diver

Personal information
- Full name: Mariya Viacheslavivna Voloshchenko
- Nationality: Ukrainian
- Born: 12 October 1987 (age 38)

Sport
- Sport: Diving
Medal record
Women's diving
Representing Ukraine
Event	1st	2nd	3rd
Summer Universiade	1	0	0
World Junior Championships	4	1	0
European Junior Diving Championships	7	5	3
Total	12	6	3
Summer Universiade
Gold medal – first place	2007 Bangkok	1 m springboard
World Junior Championships
Gold medal – first place	2004 Belém	1 m springboard
Gold medal – first place	2004 Belém	3 m springboard
Gold medal – first place	2004 Belém	3 m synchro
Gold medal – first place	2006 Kuala Lumpur	1 m springboard
Silver medal – second place	2006 Kuala Lumpur	3 m springboard
European Junior Diving Championships
Gold medal – first place	2004 Aachen	1 m springboard
Gold medal – first place	2004 Aachen	3 m springboard
Gold medal – first place	2004 Aachen	10 m platform
Gold medal – first place	2005 Elektrostal	1 m springboard
Gold medal – first place	2007 Trieste	1 m springboard
Gold medal – first place	2007 Trieste	3 m springboard
Gold medal – first place	2007 Trieste	3 m synchro
Silver medal – second place	2003 Edinburgh	1 m springboard
Silver medal – second place	2003 Edinburgh	3 m springboard
Silver medal – second place	2003 Edinburgh	10 m platform
Silver medal – second place	2006 Palma de Mallorca	3 m springboard
Silver medal – second place	2006 Palma de Mallorca	3 m synchro
Bronze medal – third place	2005 Elektrostal	3 m springboard
Bronze medal – third place	2005 Elektrostal	3 m synchro
Bronze medal – third place	2006 Palma de Mallorca	1 m springboard

Mariya Viacheslavivna Voloshchenko (Ukrainian: Марія Вячеславівна Волощенко, born 25 July 1989) is a Ukrainian diver.

She was born in Luhansk. She finished sixth with Hanna Pysmenska in the synchronized 3 metre springboard event of the 2008 Olympic Games.
