= Anișoara Oprea =

Romanian diver

Personal information
- Nationality: Romanian
- Born: 12 February 1977 (age 48); Bacău, Romania

Sport
- Sport: Diving

Anișoara Oprea (born 12 February 1977) is a Romanian diver. She competed at the 1996 Summer Olympics and the 2000 Summer Olympics.
