= Olga Khristoforova =

Russian diver (born 1980)

Personal information
- Nationality: Russian
- Born: 22 April 1980 (age 46)

Sport
- Sport: Diving
Medal record
Women's diving
Representing Russia
European Championships
Gold medal – first place	1997 Seville	10 m platform

Olga Khristoforova (born 22 April 1980) is a Russian diver. She competed in the women's 10 metre platform event at the 1996 Summer Olympics.
