= Dmytro Lysenko =

Ukrainian diver

Personal information
- Full name: Dmytro Yuriyovych Lysenko
- Nationality: Ukrainian
- Born: 10 May 1981 (age 45)
- Height: 5 ft 5 in (165 cm)
- Weight: 132 lb (60 kg)

Sport
- Club: Mariupol
Medal record
Men's diving
Representing Ukraine
European Championships
Bronze medal – third place	2004 Madrid	3 m synchro
Bronze medal – third place	2008 Eindhoven	3 m synchro
Universiade
Bronze medal – third place	2007 Bangkok	Team
Bronze medal – third place	2007 Bangkok	3 m synchro
European Junior Diving Championships
Gold medal – first place	1995 Geneva	1 m springboard
Gold medal – first place	1998 Brasschaat	3 m springboard
Gold medal – first place	1999 Aachen	3 m springboard
Silver medal – second place	1996 København	1 m springboard
Bronze medal – third place	1995 Geneva	3 m springboard
Bronze medal – third place	1996 København	3 m springboard

Dmytro Yuriyovych Lysenko (Ukrainian: Дмитро Юрійович Лисенко; born 10 May 1981) is a Ukrainian diver who competed in the Men's 3m Springboard event at the Sydney Olympics 2000, the Athens Olympics 2004, and the World Championships in Melbourne 2007. He did not qualify in 2000, but got the 11th position in 2004, and the 9th in 2007.

== Bibliography ==
- Evans, Hilary; Gjerde, Arild; Heijmans, Jeroen; Mallon, Bill; et al. "Dmytro Lysenko". Olympics at Sports-Reference.com. Sports Reference LLC. Archived from the original on 19 May 2011.
