= Tracey Richardson =

British diver

Personal information
- Born: 26 October 1982 (age 42); Hornchurch, Great Britain

Sport
- Sport: Diving

Tracey Richardson (born 26 October 1982) is a British diver.

== Career ==
- 2001 - Competed in the World Championships in Fukuoka, Japan.
- 2003 - World Diving Championships at the European Champions Cup in Stockholm, Sweden.
- 2004 - She competed in the 3 metre springboard at the 2004 Summer Olympics in Athens finishing 26th.

Richardson trains at the Southend diving club.
