= Gracie Junita =

Malaysian diver

Personal information
- Nationality: Malaysian
- Born: 11 June 1990 (age 35)

Sport
- Sport: Diving

Gracie Junita (born 11 June 1990) is a Malaysian diver. She competed in the women's 3 metre springboard event at the 2004 Summer Olympics.
