= Stefan Ahrens =

German diver

Personal information
- Nationality: German
- Born: 17 September 1976 (age 49) Rostock, East Germany
- Height: 1.78 m (5 ft 10 in)
- Weight: 70 kg (150 lb)

Sport
- Sport: Diving
Medal record
Men's diving
Representing Germany
European Championships
Silver medal – second place	2000 Helsinki	3 m springboard
Bronze medal – third place	1997 Seville	3 m springboard
Bronze medal – third place	1999 Istanbul	1 m springboard
Universiade
Bronze medal – third place	2001 Beijing	Synchronized springboard

Stefan Ahrens (born 17 September 1976) is a German diver. He competed in the 2000 Summer Olympics.
