= Diamantina Georgatou =

Greek diver (born 1986)

Personal information
- Native name: Ντιαμαντίνα Γεωργάτου
- Nationality: Greek
- Born: 9 May 1986 (age 38); United States
- Height: 167 cm (5 ft 6 in)
- Weight: 55 kg (121 lb)

Sport
- Sport: Diving

Diamantina "Dina" Georgatou (Greek: Ντιαμαντίνα "Ντίνα" Γεωργάτου; born 9 May 1986) is a former Greek diver. She competed in the synchronised 3 metre springboard, along with Sotiria Koutsopetrou, and the 3 metre springboard events at the 2004 Summer Olympics in Athens.
