= Yang Jinghui =

Chinese diver

Personal information
- Full name: Yang Jinghui
- Born: May 15, 1983 (age 43) Guangzhou, Guangdong, People's Republic of China

Sport
- Country: China
- Partner: Tian Liang
- Retired: 2005
Medal record
Men's Diving
Representing China
Olympic Games
Gold medal – first place	2004 Athens	10m Platform Synchro
Summer Universiade
Gold medal – first place	2003 Daegu	Team
Gold medal – first place	2003 Daegu	Synchronised Platform

Yang Jinghui (simplified Chinese: 杨景辉; traditional Chinese: 楊景輝; pinyin: Yáng Jǐnghuī; Jyutping: Yeung4 Ging2 Fai1; born May 15, 1983, in Guangzhou, Guangdong) is a male Chinese diver who competed in the 2004 Summer Olympics. He started diving in 1992 and entered into the National Team in 2002. At 2004 Athens Olympic Games, he won the gold medal in the synchronized 10 metre platform competition together with Tian Liang. In 2005, Yang Jinghui retired due to serious shoulder injury.
