= Annika Walter =

German Olympic diver

Personal information
- Nationality: German
- Born: 5 February 1975 (age 51) Rostock, East Germany

Sport
- Sport: Diving
Medal record
Women's diving
Representing Germany
Olympic Games
Silver medal – second place	1996 Atlanta	10 m platform
European Championships
Silver medal – second place	1997 Seville	10 m platform

Annika Walter (born 5 February 1975) is a retired German diver. Walter won a silver medal in 10m platforming diving at the 1996 Summer Olympic Games.
