= Jan Hampel =

Polish ice hockey player (1933–1962)

- Born: 25 April 1933; Katowice, Poland
- Died: 3 December 1962 (aged 29); Katowice, Poland
- Position: Goaltender
- Played for: GKS Katowice
- National team: Poland
- Playing career: 1951–1965

Jan Hampel (25 April 1933 – 3 December 1962) was a Polish former ice hockey player. He played for GKS Katowice during his career. He also played for the Polish national team at the 1952 Winter Olympics.
