= Hsieh Pei-hua =

Taiwanese diver

Personal information
- Nationality: Taiwanese
- Born: 9 May 1985 (age 39)

Sport
- Sport: Diving

Hsieh Pei-hua (traditional Chinese: 謝佩華; simplified Chinese: 谢佩华; pinyin: Xiè Pèihuá; born 9 May 1985) is a Taiwanese diver. She competed in the women's 10 metre platform event at the 2000 Summer Olympics.
