= Li Ting (diver) =

Chinese diver

Personal information
- Born: April 1, 1987 (age 39) Lingui, Guangxi, China

Sport
- Sport: Diving
Medal record
Representing China
Olympic Games
Gold medal – first place	2004 Athens	Platform synchro
World Championships
Gold medal – first place	2003 Barcelona	Platform synchro
Gold medal – first place	2005 Montréal	Springboard synchro
Asian Games
Gold medal – first place	2002 Busan	Platform synchro
Gold medal – first place	2006 Doha	Springboard synchro
Summer Universiade
Gold medal – first place	2005 İzmir	Team
Gold medal – first place	2005 Izmir	10 m platform
Gold medal – first place	2005 Izmir	Springboard synchro
Gold medal – first place	2005 Izmir	Platform synchro
Gold medal – first place	2007 Bangkok	3 m springboard
Silver medal – second place	2007 Bangkok	Springboard synchro
Silver medal – second place	2007 Bangkok	Team

Li Ting (Chinese: 李婷; Chinese: 李婷; pinyin: Lǐ Tíng; Jyutping: Lei5 Ting4; born April 1, 1987) is a Chinese diver. She competed at the 2004 Summer Olympics, earning a gold medal in the women's 10 meter synchronized platform diving along with her team partner Lao Lishi.

== Early life ==
Li was born on 1 April 1987 along with her twin sister Li Rao (李嬈) in Lingui County in Guilin to a family of Dong ethnic minority. Both the sisters fell in love with diving after witnessing their elder sister train in diving in Lingui.

== Sports career ==
In 1993, Li Ting and Li Rao, who were five years old, began to receive diving training at Chengguan No. 2 Primary School in Lingui County. In 1994, after their athletic prowess in diving was recognized, they were sent for formal training to the Guangxi Diving School in Guilin and became members of the provincial squad a year later. They were selected for the Chinese national squad in 1999.

In the 2000 National Diving Championships, she and Li Rao won the women's 10-meter platform championship. In 2001, the sisters teamed up to represent Guangxi in the 9th National Games in Guangzhou and won bronze medal in the women's synchronized 10-meter platform event. On the same year, the sisters won gold medals in the women's synchronized 10-meter platform championships in Germany, Russia and the United Kingdom. In 2002, at the 14th Asian Games in Busan, South Korea, she won the gold medal with Duan Qing in the 10-metre synchro event.

In 2003, Li Ting and Lao Lishi won the women's synchronized 10-meter platform championship at the 2003 World Aquatics Championships in Barcelona, Spain. A year later, the two teamed up again to win a gold medal for China in the synchronized 10 metre platform event at the 2004 Summer Olympics in Athens, Greece. In the same year, they also won the women's synchronized 10-meter platform championship at the 14th Diving World Cup in Athens.

In 2005, after the 2004 Summer Olympics, Li switched to the 3-meter springboard event and replaced Wu Minxia, forming a partnership with Guo Jingjing. At the 10th National Games in Nanjing, China, she finished second in the double 3-meter springboard event, finishing behind Guo Jingjing and Wu Minxia. At the 2005 Summer Universiade held in İzmir, Turkey, Li won gold medals in the 10 m platform event, and platform and springboard synchro events. On the same year, Li and Guo won the women's synchronized 3-meter springboard championships at the FINA Diving Grand Prix in Canada and the United States but finished second in the German FINA Diving Grand Prix. In 2006, Li and Guo won gold medal in the synchronized 3-meter springboard event at the 15th Asian Games in Doha, Qatar and on the same year, she won the 3-metre synchro springboard championship at the 15th Diving World Cup in Changshu, China. In terms of individual events, Li Ting ranked second behind Guo Jingjing three times in the international FINA Grand Prix events. It was only in the absence of Guo Jingjing in the 2005 FINA Grand Prix in the United States that she defeated Wu Minxia and won her first international championship in the individual event. However, in the FINA Diving Grand Prix finals held at the end of 2006, Li and Guo unexpectedly failed and only finished third. At the same time, Wu Minxia defeated Guo Jingjing four times in individual events. Such excellent results helped Wu regain her position as a partner with Guo Jingjing and the duo continued to win in all subsequent competitions. Li Ting had no choice but to switch to individual events, which were not her strong point, and partnered with newcomer He Zi.

In 2007, Li Ting defeated He Zi in 3-metre springboard final at the FINA Diving Grand Prix in Zhuhai, China and at the 2007 Summer Universiade in Bangkok, Thailand, Li won gold medal in the 3 m springboard event and silver medal in the springboard synchro event. In the same year, she and He Zi won the gold medal in the 3-meter springboard synchro at the FINA Diving Grand Prix in Spain. However, this pair, who had the potential to challenge the Olympic champion duo Guo Jingjing and Wu Minxia, made a rare mistake at the 2008 Summer Olympics diving trials in Foshan, China. During the trials, He Zi jumped 401B instead of 201B and was given zero points. As a result of this mistake, this put both Li and He in a very disadvantageous position in the trials and in the end, they were not selected for the national squad in the 16th Diving World Cup and the 2008 Summer Olympics in Beijing. Due to her not being selected for the Olympics, she faded into obscurity.

Between 2008 and 2009, Li Ting was troubled by a back injury and spent most of her time recovering in Beijing. Due to stress fracture on her leg, she had to undergo surgery but the healing was slow. As a result, she retired from professional diving. She made a brief comeback at the 2011 National Diving Championships held in Tianjin, China, where she attained sixth position in the 1-meter springboard before fading into obscurity again.

== Later life ==
In 2006, during her diving career, she enrolled at Renmin University of China and graduated in 2012 with a bachelor's degree in Business Management. That same year, she also began studying graduate degree in Sports Management at Beijing Sport University. Additionally, she joined the Chinese Communist Party and was elected as a delegate of Guangxi to attend the 18th National Congress of the Chinese Communist Party in 2012. After completion of her graduate degree, Li Ting attended University of Minnesota as a visiting scholar for nine months from 2014 to 2015. In 2019, she was enshrined into the International Swimming Hall of Fame in Fort Lauderdale, United States. In 2022, she was elected again as the delegate of Guangxi to attend the 20th National Congress of the Chinese Communist Party, and on the same year, she became a member of the 11th Standing Committee of the Guangxi Youth Federation and served as the director of the Sports Committee, and was invited to attend the China-Vietnam Youth Friendship Meeting and China-Vietnam Youth Development Forum where spoke as a representative of the Chinese youth. In 2023, she was appointed as one of the ambassadors for the First Student (Youth) Games in Nanning, China.

Li served as the deputy director of the Guangxi Aquatic Sports Development Center, focusing on rebuilding and enhancing diving from both managerial and technical perspectives. Since 2022, she has been serving as the deputy director of the Guangxi Competitive Sports Department and as member of the Guilin Municipal Committee of the Chinese People's Political Consultative Conference.
