= Lao Lishi =

Chinese diver (born 1987)

Personal information
- Nationality: Chinese
- Born: 12 December 1987 (age 38) Lianjiang, Guangdong, China
- Height: 1.53 m (5 ft 0 in)

Sport
- Sport: Diving
- Events: 10 m, 10 m synchro
- Retired: 2010
Medal record
Event	1st	2nd	3rd
Olympic Games	1	1	-
World Championships	1	1	-
Summer Universiade	2	3	-
Asian Games	1	-	-
Women's diving
Representing China
Olympic Games
Gold medal – first place	2004 Athens	Platform Synchro
Silver medal – second place	2004 Athens	10m Platform
World Championships
Gold medal – first place	2003 Barcelona	Platform Synchro
Silver medal – second place	2003 Barcelona	10m Platform
Summer Universiade
Gold medal – first place	2009 Belgrade	10 m synchro
Gold medal – first place	2007 Bangkok	10 m platform
Silver medal – second place	2007 Bangkok	Team
Silver medal – second place	2009 Belgrade	Team
Silver medal – second place	2009 Belgrade	3 m synchro
Asian Games
Gold medal – first place	2002 Busan	10m Platform

Lao Lishi (simplified Chinese: 劳丽诗; traditional Chinese: 勞麗詩; pinyin: Láo Lìshī; Jyutping: Lou4 Lai6 Si1; born 12 December 1987) is a Chinese retired diver. He represented China at the 2004 Summer Olympics, earning a silver medal in the 10-meter women's platform and a gold medal in the women's 10-meter synchronized platform along with Li Ting.

== Early life ==
Born in 1987 in Zhanjiang, Lao was one of six children in the family. Her father was a self-employed businessman while her mother was a housewife. Lao began swimming at just over five years old. While accompanying her mother, who regularly took her older brother to diving training at a sports school in Zhanjiang, she played in the children's pool. This caught the attention of the coach at the sports school, who recognized her qualities of a promising diver.

== Sports career ==
In 1994, while still in preschool, Lao officially began practicing diving at the sports school in Chikan District of Zhanjiang. Despite having a cold and a fever during the 1997 Zhanjiang City Children's Diving Championships, she competed and won first place. In March 1998, she joined the Guangdong Diving Team.

In 2001, she participated in her first national competition, winning the doubles diving and attained third in singles diving at the 9th National Games in Guangzhou. In January 2002, she was selected for the national team and on 26 June, she won the women's 10-meter individual platform diving championship at the 2002 FINA Diving World Cup in Seville, Spain, along with the 10-meter synchro with Li Ting. On 14 October, she attained first place in the 10 meter platform at the 2002 Asian Games in Busan, South Korea, with 434.220 points. She also won multiple titles at the FINA Diving Grand Prix events in Spain, Canada and the United States.

In 2003, she won the 10-meter individual, and synchro with Li Ting, in FINA Diving Grand Prix in Australia and China. At the 2004 FINA Diving World Cup finals in Athens, Greece, Lao and Li won the 10 meter synchro platform with an absolute advantage, winning the second gold medal for the Chinese team. On 14 July 2004, the final list of the Chinese national diving team for the 2004 Summer Olympics in Athens was announced in Jinan, China and Lao was selected for the 10-meter individual and 10-meter syncho platforms. At the Olympics, she and Li won the gold medal in the 10-meter synchro with 352.14 points. Lao won silver medal in the induvidual 10-meter platform in the 2004 Olympics with 576.26 points.

After the Olympics, Lao faded out of the national team and returned to the provincial team. At the 2005 National Games in Nanjing, China, she performed poorly and only won the eighth place in the 10-meter platform. In 2006, she returned to the national team and in June 2007, she won the gold medal in the individual 10-meter platform at the FINA Diving Grand Prix in Madrid, Spain. On the same year, at the 2007 Summer Universiade in Bangkok, Thailand, she won gold medal in the individual 10 meter platform. In 2008, during the 2008 Summer Olympics trials held in Jinan, she strained her shoulder due to discomfort during a water entry exercise before the trials. As a result, she lost to newcomers Chen Ruolin and Wang Xin and was not selected for the national team for the Olympics.

On 7 July 2009, Lao along with Chen Ni won gold medal 10-meter synchro at the 2009 Summer Universiade in Belgrade, Serbia, and also won the silver medal at the 3-meter springboard synchro at the same event. In April 2010, at the age of 23, Lao officially retired, ending her sports career.

== Later life ==
After retiring from sports, Lao graduated from Sun Yat-sen University. She briefly worked as a sports school teacher and a member of a diving team before eventually joining the Youth Volunteer Action Guidance Center under the Guangdong Provincial Committee of the Communist Youth League of China, where she served as a senior staff member responsible for public welfare and charity. In early 2014, she resigned from her civil service position, and by June of the same year, she became a store owner, selling jewellery on the online shopping platform Taobao, which is owned by the Chinese multinational technology company Alibaba Group. In September 2014, she was invited by Alibaba Group co-founder and chairman Jack Ma to be one of the eight bell ringers for the listing of Alibaba Group in the New York Stock Exchange. In 2015, she was enshrined into the International Swimming Hall of Fame in Fort Lauderdale, United States.

On 26 May 2020, during the COVID-19 pandemic in China, Lao shared an excerpt from Wuhan Diary, an online diary written by Fang Fang, on her account on the social media platform Weibo. The excerpt described the death of a nurse who died on the frontlines while dealing with the pandemic in the city of Wuhan. This resulted in online netizens attacking Lao. In response, Lao stated that "suddenly, I feel very happy because I haven't lived the way you like" and "if I had lived in a way that earned your praise, I would immediately jump off the ten-meter platform—into an empty pool, the kind without water." On 3 June 2020, Lao published a post on Weibo condemning online bullying and aggressive nationalism, and she stated:

As a citizen of the People's Republic of China, born and raised, I love my motherland and want it to get better and better, for the economy to flourish, for our headstrong civilization to shine, for goodwill to prevail among the people. Is that wrong? I don't think so. What is wrong for a bunch of spineless trolls to rampage online, bullying honest people, picking on good people, attacking people at every turn with idiotic verbal assaults along the lines of "I don't like you, get the hell out of China." Please remember, no one is obliged to hand over the land they love to a bunch of invertebrates so they can make it into their playground. Not today, not ever. I'm a decent person, but I pull no punches!

The post gained significant traction, receiving over 50,000 likes and 7,400 shares. Following the controversy, her Weibo account was banned for one year.

== Honours ==
In 2005, the city of Zhanjiang built a 12.8 meter diving goddess sculpture, commemorating Lao's Olympic gold medal performance.

== See also ==
- Diving at the 2004 Summer Olympics
