= Dolores Saez =

Spanish diver

Personal information
- Nationality: Spanish
- Born: 10 January 1979 (age 47) Madrid, Spain

Sport
- Sport: Diving
Medal record
Women's diving
Representing Spain
European Championships
Silver medal – second place	1999 Istanbul	10 m platform
Silver medal – second place	2004 Madrid	10 m synchro
Bronze medal – third place	1997 Seville	3 m synchro
Universiade
Silver medal – second place	2001 Beijing	Platform synchro

Dolores Saez (born 10 January 1979) is a Spanish diver. She competed at the 1996 Summer Olympics, the 2000 Summer Olympics and the 2004 Summer Olympics.
