= Aleksandr Dobroskok =

Russian Olympic diver

Personal information
- Born: 12 June 1982 (age 44) Buzuluk, Orenburg Oblast, Soviet Union

Sport
- Sport: Diving
Medal record
Representing Russia
Olympic Games
Silver medal – second place	2000 Sydney	3 m synchro
World Championships
Gold medal – first place	2003 Barcelona	3 m springboard
Gold medal – first place	2003 Barcelona	3 m synchro
Bronze medal – third place	2001 Fukuoka	1 m springboard
European Aquatics Championships
Silver medal – second place	2000 Helsinki	3 m synchro
Silver medal – second place	2006 Budapest	1 m springboard
Silver medal – second place	2006 Budapest	3 m springboard
Bronze medal – third place	2000 Helsinki	3 m springboard
European Diving Championships
Gold medal – first place	2009 Turin	3 m springboard

Aleksandr Mikhailovich Dobroskok (Russian: Александр Михайлович Доброскок; born 12 June 1982) is a Russian diver who competed in the 2000 Summer Olympics and in the 2004 Summer Olympics. He won a silver medal in the 3 m Springboard Synchronized event at the 2000 Summer Olympics with his partner Dmitri Sautin.

In the 2003 World Championships in Barcelona, he won gold in both 3m individual, and 3m synchro (with Dmitri Sautin). He also won the 2009 European championships on 3m.

His younger brother Dmitriy Dobroskok is also an international diver.
