= Svetlana Timoshinina =

Russian diver

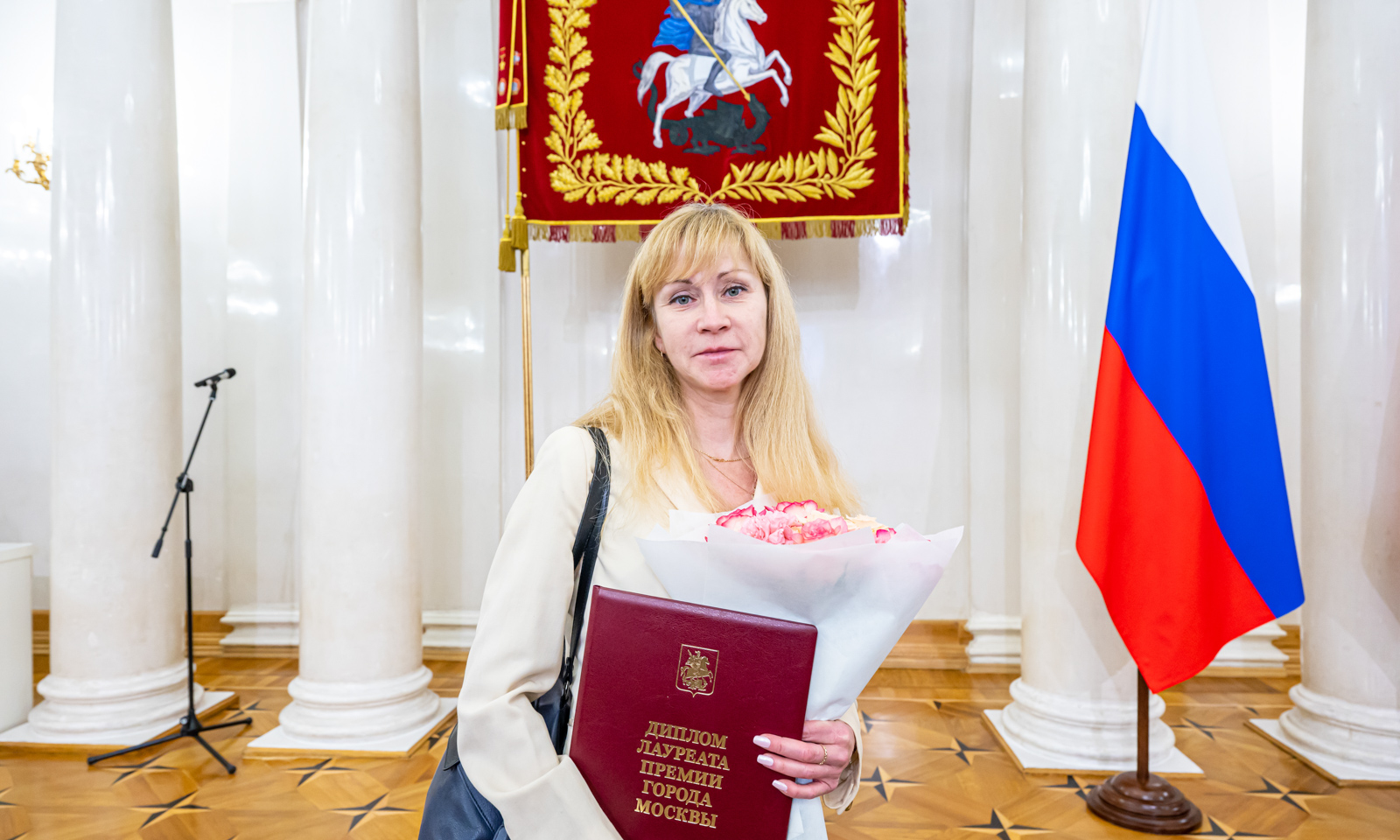

Personal information
- Nationality: Russian
- Born: 15 July 1973 (age 52) Moscow, Russian SFSR, Soviet Union

Sport
- Sport: Diving
Medal record
Women's diving
Representing Russia
World Championships
Silver medal – second place	2001 Fukuoka	10 m synchro
Bronze medal – third place	2003 Barcelona	10 m synchro
European Championships
Gold medal – first place	1999 Istanbul	10 m synchro
Gold medal – first place	2000 Helsinki	10 m platform
Silver medal – second place	2000 Helsinki	10 m synchro
Bronze medal – third place	1995 Vienna	10 m platform
Bronze medal – third place	1999 Istanbul	10 m platform
Bronze medal – third place	2002 Berlin	10 m synchro
Representing Russia
European Championships
Gold medal – first place	1993 Sheffield	10 m platform

Svetlana Timoshinina (born 15 July 1973) is a Russian diver. She competed at the 1996 Summer Olympics, the 2000 Summer Olympics and the 2004 Summer Olympics.
