= Tobias Schellenberg =

German diver

Personal information
- Full name: Tobias Schellenberg
- Born: 17 November 1978 (age 47) Leipzig, East Germany

Sport
- Country: Germany
- Partner: Andreas Wels
Medal record
Men's diving
Representing Germany
Olympic Games
Silver medal – second place	2004 Athens	3 m synchro
World Championships
Silver medal – second place	2005 Montreal	3 m synchro
Bronze medal – third place	2003 Barcelona	3 m synchro
Bronze medal – third place	2007 Melbourne	3 m synchro
European Championships
Gold medal – first place	2000 Helsinki	3 m synchro
Gold medal – first place	2006 Budapest	3 m synchro
Silver medal – second place	2002 Berlin	3 m synchro
Silver medal – second place	2008 Eindhoven	3 m synchro
Bronze medal – third place	2004 Madrid	1 m springboard
Universiade
Bronze medal – third place	2001 Beijing	3 m synchro
Bronze medal – third place	2003 Daegu	1 m springboard

Tobias Schellenberg (born 17 November 1978) is a German competitive and synchronized diver.

In 2000 he became three-time German Champion in competitive diving, and European Champion in synchronized diving on the 3 m springboard together with his partner Andreas Wels.

In competitive diving, he won another two German Champion titles in 2001, four in 2002, and five in 2003. Together with Andreas Wels he became vice European Champion in synchronized diving on the 3 m springboard in 2002, and won bronze at the 2003 World Aquatics Championships in Barcelona.

At the 2004 Olympic Games in Athens Tobias Schellenberg and Andreas Wels won the silver medal in synchronized diving on the 3 m springboard. They also won the silver medal in synchronized diving on the 3 m springboard at the 2005 World Aquatics Championships in Montreal.
