= Joel Rodríguez (diver) =

Mexican diver

Personal information
- Nationality: Mexican
- Born: 19 May 1974 (age 52)

Sport
- Sport: Diving
Medal record
Men's diving
Representing Mexico
Universiade
Silver medal – second place	2001 Beijing	Team
Silver medal – second place	2001 Beijing	Synchronized Springboard

Joel Rodríguez (born 19 May 1974) is a Mexican diver. He competed at the 1996 Summer Olympics and the 2000 Summer Olympics.
