= Eduardo Rueda =

Mexican diver

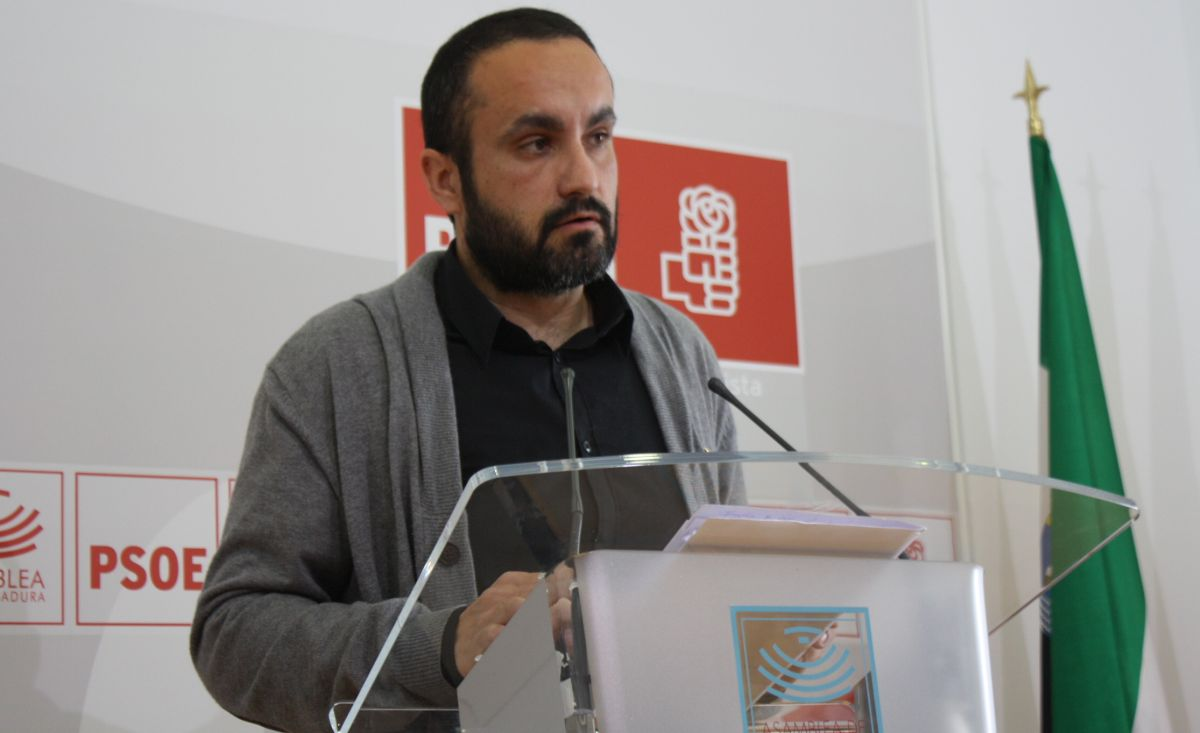

Personal information
- Born: 23 October 1972 (age 53) Mexico City, Mexico

Sport
- Sport: Diving
Medal record
Representing Mexico
Pan American Games
Bronze medal – third place	1999 Winnipeg	10m platform

Eduardo Rueda (born 23 October 1972) is a Mexican diver. He competed in two events at the 2000 Summer Olympics.
