= Tian Liang =

Chinese diver and actor

- 田亮
- Born: 27 August 1979 (age 47); Chongqing, China
- Education: Xi'an Jiaotong University; Tsinghua University
- Occupations: Diver; actor
- Years active: 1990-2007
- Height: 1.72 m (5 ft 7 1/2 in)
- Spouse: Ye Yiqian (叶一茜) (m. 2007)
- Children: 2

Tian Liang
Sport
- Country: China
- Sport: diving
Medal record
Event	1st	2nd	3rd
Olympic Games	2	1	1
World Championships	3	1	2
FINA Diving World Cup	9	-	–
Asian Games	2	-	–
Summer Universiade	6	-	–
Men's diving
Representing China
Olympic Games
Gold medal – first place	2000 Sydney	10m Platform
Gold medal – first place	2004 Athens	10m Platform Synchro
Silver medal – second place	2000 Sydney	10m Platform Synchro
Bronze medal – third place	2004 Athens	10m Platform
World Championships
Gold medal – first place	1998 Perth	10m Platform Synchro
Gold medal – first place	2001 Fukuoka	10m Platform
Gold medal – first place	2001 Fukuoka	10m Platform Synchro
Silver medal – second place	1998 Perth	10m Platform
Bronze medal – third place	2003 Barcelona	10m Platform
Bronze medal – third place	2003 Barcelona	10m Platform Synchro
FINA Diving World Cup
Gold medal – first place	2004 Athens	10m Synchro
Gold medal – first place	2004 Athens	10m Platform
Gold medal – first place	2002 Seville	10m Synchro
Gold medal – first place	2002 Seville	10m Platform
Gold medal – first place	2000 Sydney	10m Synchro
Gold medal – first place	2000 Sydney	10m Platform
Gold medal – first place	1999 Wellington	10m Synchro
Gold medal – first place	1999 Wellington	10m Platform
Gold medal – first place	1995 Atlanta	10m Synchro
Asian Games
Gold medal – first place	1998 Bangkok	10m Platform
Gold medal – first place	2002 Busan	10m Platform
Summer Universiade
Gold medal – first place	2001 Beijing	10m Platform
Gold medal – first place	2001 Beijing	Synchronized Platform
Gold medal – first place	2001 Beijing	Team
Gold medal – first place	2003 Daegu	10m Platform
Gold medal – first place	2003 Daegu	Synchronised Platform
Gold medal – first place	2003 Daegu	Team

Tian Liang (Chinese: 田亮; pinyin: Tián Liàng; born August 27, 1979) is a Chinese actor and former diver.

== Diving career ==
Tian won gold in the 10 m platform event in the 2000 Sydney Olympics. In the Summer Olympics 2004, he won the bronze medal in the 10 m platform event and a gold medal in the synchronised platform event.

Since then, he and another gold medal winner, the Chinese female diver Guo Jingjing, often appeared together in public activities. They were better known together as Liang Jingjing (亮晶晶, Tian and Guo's combined given names, synonymous with the word for 'sparkling').

After winning his multiple Olympic medals, Tian received numerous invitations to lend his name and face to corporate promotions. His involvement in commercial activities, and perhaps other disputes with the national team, have led the national team to fire him after repeated warnings. In spite of this, Tian continued to practice diving with a provincial team. He maintained his diving standard and won a medal at the following National Games of China. Although there was great public interest in him rejoining the national team, it did not happen. Tian has since then split his schedule between diving training and public activities. Finally on March 25, 2007, Tian announced his retirement as a diver.

On July 29, 2008, it was announced that Tian would not be rejoining the national team and participating in the 2008 Beijing Olympics.

== Filmography ==
- The Bodyguard (2015)
- Who Moved My Fiancee (2015)
- The Right Mistake (2015)
- Emperor's Holidays (2015)
- Stealing Legend (2014)
- Where Are We Going? Dad (2014)
- Badges of Fury (2013)
- National Treasure Mystery (2013)
- Blame It on the Phone (2013)
- On My Way (2012)
- Princess's Temptation (2012)
- Crazy Shanzhai (2011)
- I Love Wing Chun (2011)
- A Beautiful Life (2011)
- The Fantastic Water Babes (2010)
