= Loudy Wiggins =

Australian diver

Personal information
- Born: 7 July 1979 (age 47) Haifa
- Height: 4 ft 11 in (1.50 m)
- Weight: 97 lb (44 kg; 6.9 st)

Sport
- Country: Australia
- Events: 10m platform, 10m synchro
Medal record
Women's Diving
Representing Australia
Olympic Games
Bronze medal – third place	2000 Sydney	10m Platform Synchro
Bronze medal – third place	2004 Athens	10m Platform
World Championships
Silver medal – second place	2003 Barcelona	10m Platform Synchro
Silver medal – second place	2005 Montreal	10m Platform
Silver medal – second place	2005 Montreal	10m Platform Synchro
Bronze medal – third place	2001 Fukuoka	10m Platform
Commonwealth Games
Gold medal – first place	2002 Manchester	10m Platform
Gold medal – first place	2006 Melbourne	10m Platform Synchro
Gold medal – first place	2006 Melbourne	10m Platform
World Cup
Silver medal – second place	2004 Athens	10m Platform Synchro
Silver medal – second place	2004 Athens	10m Platform

Loudy Wiggins (née Tourky) (born 7 July 1979) is an Australian former diver. She was born in Haifa to Palestinian Christian parents and moved to Australia when she was 4 years old.

Wiggins was a gymnast at the Australian Institute of Sport, then began diving when she was 12 on suggestion from her physiotherapist.

Wiggins competed at her first Olympic Games for Diving when she was 17 years old at the 1996 Summer Olympics in Atlanta. She won bronze in the 10m synchronised platform event at the 2000 Summer Olympics in Sydney, becoming the first Australian to win an Olympic medal in diving since Dick Eve in 1924 (with Rebecca Gilmore). She and Rebecca Gilmore were also the first Australian female Olympic diving medallists.

She won bronze at the 2001 World Aquatics Championships in Fukuoka after a successful year on the Diving Grand Prix circuit and was named Female Australian Diver of the Year. Loudy was known as being a powerful platform diver.

After winning numerous National championships in both springboard and platform as well as many international medals, in 2002 she won gold in the 10m platform event at the 2002 Commonwealth Games in Manchester and backed this up in 2003 by winning first place at an unprecedented three successive CAN-AM-MEX FINA Diving Grand Prix competitions coming home with 6 gold medals. She finished 2003 with a silver medal at the FINA Aquatic World Championships in the 10m synchronised diving event in Barcelona.

In 2004, after finishing second in the 10m platform event at the Diving World Cup in Athens, Wiggins won bronze in the 10m event at the 2004 Summer Olympics in Athens. She also won 2 silver medals the following year at the 2005 FINA World Aquatic Championships in Montreal in the 10m and 10m Synchro events and 2 gold medals at the same events at the Melbourne 2006 Commonwealth Games.

Wiggins trained for the 2008 Summer Olympics in Beijing, but a calf injury suffered during the Olympic selection trials on 13 April 2008 prevented her from competing in the Games.

After getting married and having her first child, Wiggins began a comeback, placing 14th at the Olympic Test Event in London.

Returning to Australia, she partnered with Rachel Bugg and, after very limited preparation, defeated Melissa Wu and Alexandra Croak at the Australian Nomination Trials. and competed at her fourth Olympic Games at the 2012 Summer Olympics in London, where, at 33, she was the oldest diver in the field.

Wiggins has a degree in media and communications, from the University of Sydney, was on the Australian Olympic Committee Athletes' Commission, the Board of Directors of Diving Victoria from 2012 - 2016, Board of Diving Australia 2021 - 2025.

== Personal life ==
Wiggins is married to former Carlton Australian rules football player Simon Wiggins. They have a daughter born in 2010 and a son born in 2013.
