= Andreas Wels =

German Olympic diver

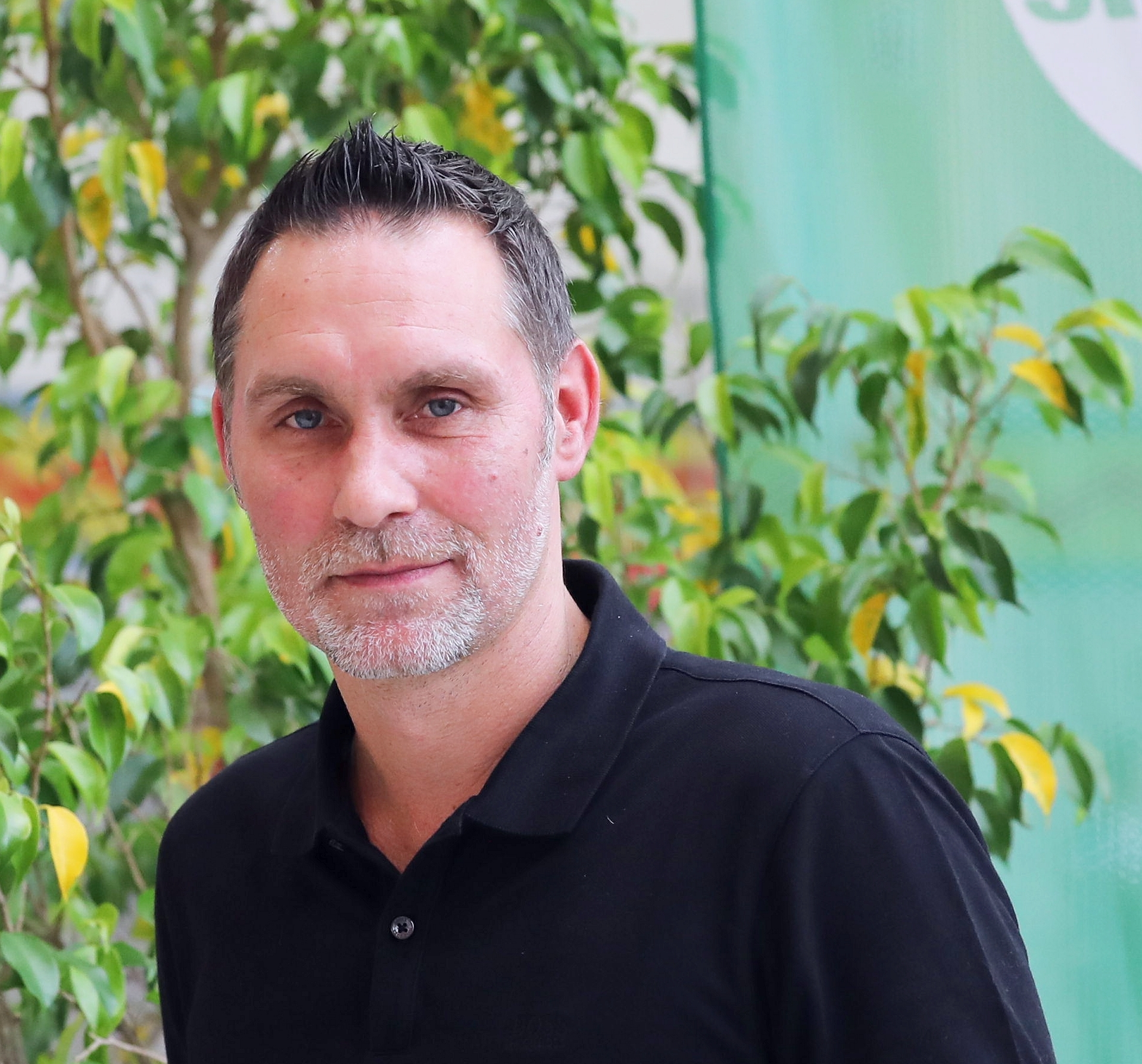

Personal information
- Born: 1 January 1975 (age 51) Schönebeck, Saxony-Anhalt, East Germany
Medal record
Men's diving
Representing Germany
Olympic Games
Silver medal – second place	2004 Athens	3 m synchro
World Championships
Silver medal – second place	2005 Montreal	3 m synchro
Bronze medal – third place	2003 Barcelona	3 m synchro
Bronze medal – third place	2007 Melbourne	3 m synchro
European Championships
Gold medal – first place	1997 Seville	1 m springboard
Gold medal – first place	2000 Helsinki	3 m synchro
Gold medal – first place	2004 Madrid	3 m springboard
Gold medal – first place	2006 Budapest	3 m synchro
Silver medal – second place	1997 Seville	3 m springboard
Silver medal – second place	1999 Istanbul	1 m springboard
Silver medal – second place	2002 Berlin	3 m springboard
Silver medal – second place	2002 Berlin	3 m synchro
Silver medal – second place	2008 Eindhoven	3 m synchro

Andreas Wels (born 1 January 1975) is a German competitive and synchronized diver. He has competed at three Olympic Games.

In 1997 he won his first international title, European Champion in competitive diving on the 1 m springboard. In 1999 he became vice world cup champion in competitive diving on the 3 m springboard, and in 2000 European Champion in synchronized diving on the 3 m springboard together with his partner Tobias Schellenberg.

In 2002 he became vice European Champion in competitive diving and synchronized diving on the 3 m springboard. At the 2003 World Aquatics Championships in Barcelona he won bronze in synchronized diving on the 3 m springboard. In 2004 he became European Champion in competitive diving on the 3 m springboard.

At the 2004 Olympic Games in Athens Andreas Wels and Tobias Schellenberg won the silver medal in synchronized diving on the 3 m springboard. They also won the silver medal in synchronized diving on the 3 m springboard at the 2005 World Aquatics Championships in Montreal and a gold at the 2006 European Aquatics Championships in Budapest.
