= World Aquatics Diving World Cup =

International diving competition

- Status: Active
- Genre: Sporting event
- Date: Mid-year
- Frequency: Biennial
- Country: Varying
- Inaugurated: 1979

The World Aquatics Diving World Cup is an international annual (formerly biennial) diving competition that was first contested in The Woodlands, Texas in 1979. The 2012 edition served as Diving's test event for the 2012 Olympics, as well as the final qualifying event for Diving at those Games.

In 2022, at the FINA Extraordinary Congress, FINA rebranded to World Aquatics and adopted a new structure for international diving competitions, including the World Cup. The FINA World Series and FINA Diving World Cup were merged into an annual multi-stop competition culminating in a Super Final.

== Format ==
The standard World Aquatics Diving World Cup consists of 3 stops across various locations around the world, with the third and final stop being designated as the Super Final.

=== Stop 1 & 2 ===
==== Qualification ====
Each National Federation is permitted to enter 2 athletes into each Individual Event (Men & Women, 3m Springboard & 10m Platform), provided that they have met qualification scores at a recent recognised international championship as outlined by World Aquatics. Host federations of any stop on the Diving World Cup may enter 3 athletes, although only the top two ranking athletes entered by the federation will be eligible to proceed to the Super Final.

National Federations can only enter 1 team into the Synchronised & Team Event. A team from the National Federation (not the individual divers) must have met the qualifying score at a recent, recognised international championship as outlined by World Aquatics.

==== Competition & Progression ====
All individual divers participate in a split-preliminary round of diving at each stop, with the combined top 12 highest scoring divers proceeding to the stop Final. Athletes then receive ranking points depending on their rank at the Finals of each stop. After the completion of Stop 1 and Stop 2, the top 12 divers by total ranking points are invited to the Diving World Cup Super Final (Stop 3).

Synchronised events do not have a preliminary round and receive ranking points depending on their performance at the Direct Final. The top 8 teams are invited to the Super Final.

=== Super Final (Stop 3) ===
The Super Final of the Diving World Cup uses a separate format to standard diving competitions in individual competitions, with a head-to-head format replacing the standard preliminary round of the competition. The Team and Synchronised diving competitions utilise the standard diving competition format.

==== Head-to-head ====
Divers will be seeded and paired based on their scores at Stop 1 and Stop 2 of the World Cup for a head-to-head competition. The two divers will each complete 3 dives from their full list, with the higher scoring diver proceeding to the semifinals, and the lower scoring diver being eliminated.

==== Semifinal ====
The divers who won their respective head-to-heads are arranged into two groups of 3 for the semifinals, with scores from the head-to-head carrying over. Athletes then complete the remainder of their dive list, with the 2 highest scoring athletes across both their head-to-head and semifinal rounds from each group qualifying for the final.

==== Final ====
Results from the head-to-head and semifinal are wiped for the final. Divers will complete their full list of 5 (women) or 6 (men) dives, with medals being awarded in accordance with their total scores.

== Editions (2023-) ==
Number	Year	Stop 1	Stop 2	Super Final (Stop 3)
24	2023	Xi'an, China	Montreal, Canada	Berlin, Germany
25	2024	Montreal, Canada	Berlin, Germany	Xi'an, China
26	2025	Guadalajara, Mexico	Windsor, Canada	Beijing, China
27	2026	Montreal, Canada	(Mexico) ~~Zapopan, Mexico~~^{1}	Beijing, China
28	2027	Montreal, Canada	TBD, Mexico	Beijing, China

1 - Stop 2 of the 2026 World Cup was cancelled due to concerns about unrest in the Jalisco region

== Editions (1979–2022) ==
Number	Year	Host city	Host country	Events
1	1979	The Woodlands	United States	4
2	1981	Mexico City	Mexico	4
3	1983	The Woodlands	United States	4
4	1985	Shanghai	China	4
5	1987	Amersfoort	Netherlands	4
6	1989	Indianapolis	United States	6
7	1991	Winnipeg	Canada	6
8	1993	Beijing	China	6
9	1995	Atlanta	United States	10
10	1997	Mexico City	Mexico	10
11	1999	Wellington	New Zealand	10
12	2000	Sydney	Australia	10
13	2002	Seville	Spain	10
14	2004	Athens	Greece	8
15	2006	Changshu	China	10

Number	Year	Host city	Host country	Events
16	2008	Beijing	China	8
17	2010	Changzhou	China	8
18	2012	London	United Kingdom	8
19	2014	Shanghai	China	9
20	2016	Rio de Janeiro	Brazil	8
21	2018	Wuhan	China	11
22	2021	Tokyo	Japan	8
23	2022	Berlin	Germany	9

== Medals (1979–2022) ==
Rank	Nation	Gold	Silver	Bronze	Total
1	China	134	61	30	225
2	Russia	11	22	12	45
3	United States	11	18	22	51
4	Germany	4	17	18	39
5	Canada	4	13	19	36
6	Great Britain	4	4	9	17
7	Mexico	3	6	13	22
8	Australia	2	12	19	33
9	Soviet Union	1	8	6	15
10	Malaysia	1	2	2	5
11	Ukraine	0	3	4	7
12	Japan	0	2	3	5
13	East Germany	0	1	3	4
13	Italy	0	1	3	4
15	Cuba	0	1	2	3
16	Austria	0	1	1	2
16	France	0	1	1	2
18	Jamaica	0	1	0	1
18	North Korea	0	1	0	1
20	Spain	0	0	2	2
21	Belarus	0	0	1	1
21	Colombia	0	0	1	1
21	Czechoslovakia	0	0	1	1
21	Kazakhstan	0	0	1	1
21	South Korea	0	0	1	1
Totals (25 entries)		175	175	174	524

== See also ==
- FINA Diving Grand Prix
- FINA Diving World Series
- World Diving Championships
- FINA World Junior Diving Championships
