= Guo Jingjing =

Chinese diver (born 1981)

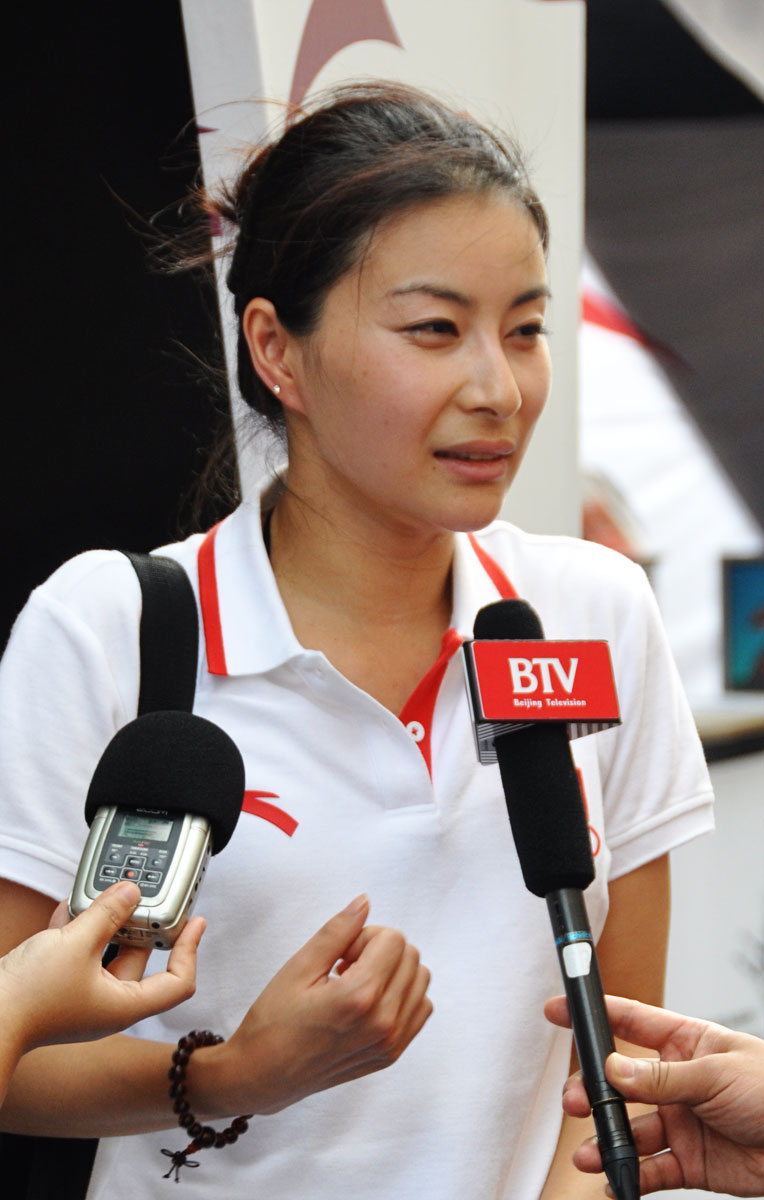
- Guo in 2010

Personal information
- Full name: Guo Jingjing
- Born: October 15, 1981 (age 44) Baoding, Hebei, China
- Height: 5 ft 4 in (163 cm)

Sport
- Country: People's Republic of China
- Event(s): 3m springboard, 3m synchro
- Partner: Wu Mingxia
- Former partner: Wu Mingxia
- Coached by: Zhou Jihong
Medal record
Event	1st	2nd	3rd
Olympic Games	4	2	0
World Championships	10	1	0
Summer Universiade	11	0	0
Asian Games	4	0	0
Total	29	3	0
Olympic Games
Gold medal – first place	2004 Athens	3 m Synchro Springboard
Gold medal – first place	2004 Athens	3 m Springboard
Gold medal – first place	2008 Beijing	3 m Synchro Springboard
Gold medal – first place	2008 Beijing	3m Springboard
Silver medal – second place	2000 Sydney	3 m Synchro Springboard
Silver medal – second place	2000 Sydney	3 m Springboard
World Championships
Gold medal – first place	2001 Fukuoka	3m Springboard
Gold medal – first place	2001 Fukuoka	Synchro Springboard
Gold medal – first place	2003 Barcelona	3m Springboard
Gold medal – first place	2003 Barcelona	Synchro Springboard
Gold medal – first place	2005 Montréal	3m Springboard
Gold medal – first place	2005 Montréal	Synchro Springboard
Gold medal – first place	2007 Melbourne	3m Springboard
Gold medal – first place	2007 Melbourne	Synchro Springboard
Gold medal – first place	2009 Rome	3m Springboard
Gold medal – first place	2009 Rome	Synchro Springboard
Silver medal – second place	1998 Perth	3m Springboard
Asian Games
Gold medal – first place	1998 Bangkok	3 m Springboard
Gold medal – first place	2002 Busan	3 m Springboard
Gold medal – first place	2002 Busan	3 m Synchro Springboard
Gold medal – first place	2006 Doha	3 m Synchro Springboard
Summer Universiade
Gold medal – first place	2001 Beijing	Team
Gold medal – first place	2001 Beijing	1m Springboard
Gold medal – first place	2001 Beijing	3m Springboard
Gold medal – first place	2001 Beijing	Platform Synchro
Gold medal – first place	2005 Izmir	Team
Gold medal – first place	2005 Izmir	1m Springboard
Gold medal – first place	2005 Izmir	Synchro Springboard
Gold medal – first place	2003 Daegu	Team
Gold medal – first place	2003 Daegu	Synchro Springboard
Silver medal – second place	2003 Daegu	1m Springboard
Silver medal – second place	2003 Daegu	3m Springboard

Guo Jingjing (Chinese: 郭晶晶; pinyin: Guō Jīngjīng; born October 15, 1981, in Baoding, Hebei) is a retired Chinese diver, and multi-time Olympic gold medalist and world champion. Guo is tied with her partner Wu Minxia for winning the most Olympic medals (6) of any female diver and she won the 3m springboard event at five consecutive World Championships. She announced her retirement in 2011.

== Career ==
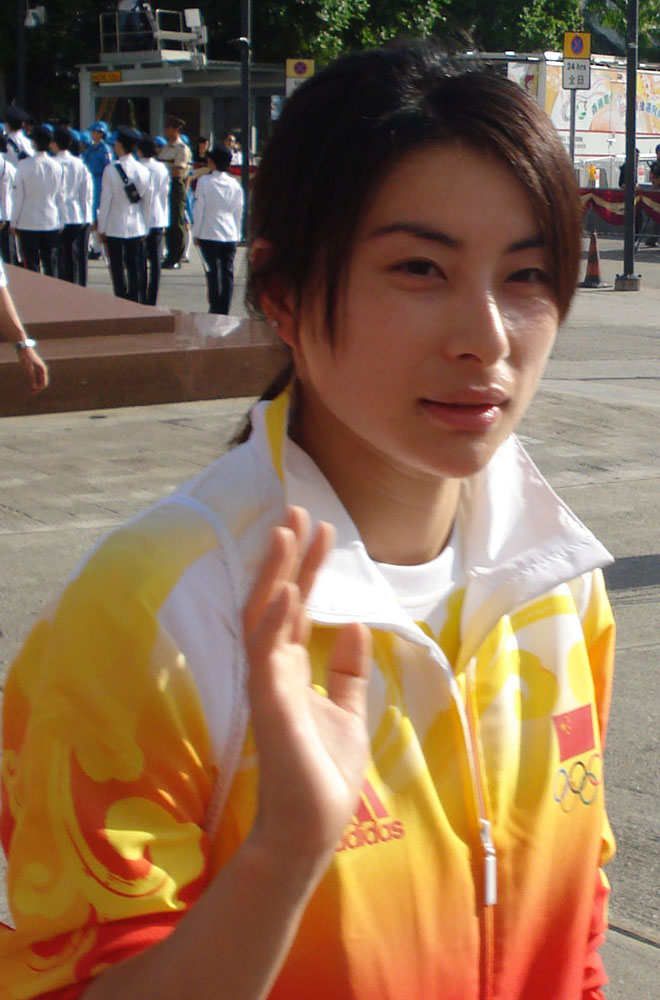
Guo at the 2008 Summer Olympics in Beijing

She took up diving when she was six years old at the Baoding Training Base. She started training in competitive diving in 1988, and was selected to dive for the Chinese national team in 1992. Guo first competed at the Olympics in 1996. Had she duplicated her performances from many other events, including the 1995 Chinese Nationals, 1995 Dive Canada, or 1996 Chinese Olympic Trials, she would have easily won gold ahead of teammate Fu Mingxia, but had a disastrous final, missing all 5 dives, and finished in 5th place. Her coach leading up to the 2008 Olympics was Zhong Shaozhen.

During the 2004 Summer Olympics she won a gold medal in the 3-meter women's synchronized springboard along with Wu Minxia, before winning her first individual Olympic gold in the 3-meter women's springboard.

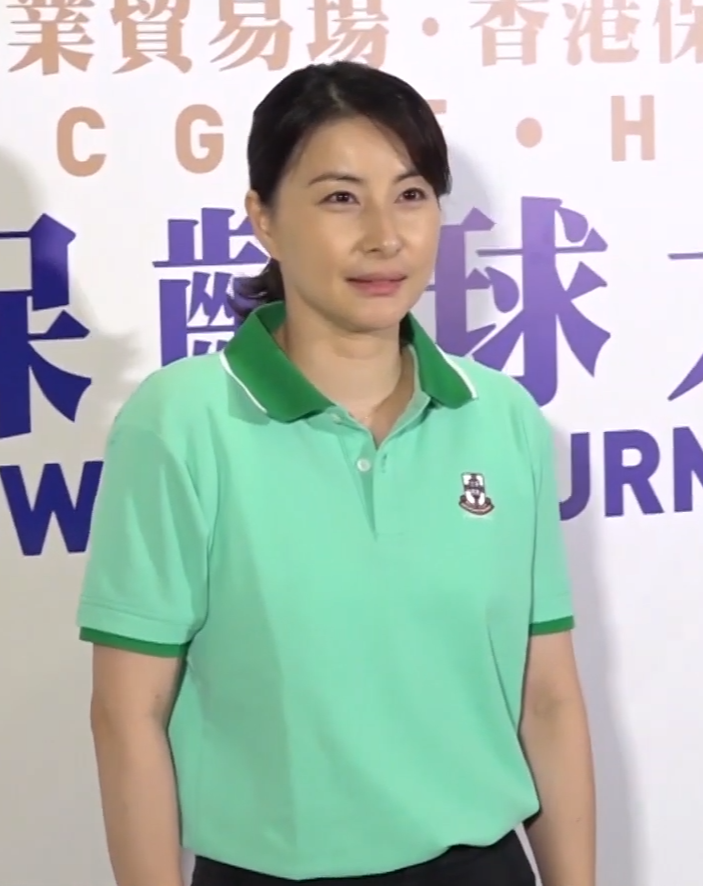
Guo in 2019

After the 2004 Summer Olympics, Guo became a Chinese national sports figure, with a contract with McDonald's, as well as multiple other endorsement contracts. She was later banned by the national team for excessive commercial activities, but was accepted back to the team when she agreed to focus on diving and give up many promotional activities. She was also made to surrender nearly 4 million dollars she had earned from her endorsements. Tian Liang, a fellow Olympic gold medalist offered the same deal as Guo, declined to pay back the money to the government, and was excluded from the Olympic games. Guo is the leading member of the Chinese national women's diving team, and is known in China as "The Princess of Diving". Guo announced on November 23, 2006, she would retire following the 2008 Summer Olympics.

Guo won two more gold medals at the 2008 Olympic Games in Beijing. At the end of the Beijing Games, Guo became the most decorated female Olympic diver, and tied fellow Chinese athlete Fu Mingxia, and Americans Pat McCormick and Greg Louganis with the most gold medals (four). Guo won the gold medal in the women's 3-meter springboard with a total of 415.35 points. The silver medal was awarded to Yuliya Pakhalina of Russia, whose score was 398.60, followed by Wu Minxia of China with 389.85 for the bronze medal. In synchronized diving, the defending champions Guo, and Wu, who won the event in the 2004 Athens Olympics and three World Championships, had led the entire competition in Beijing, winning the gold medal, with Yuliya Pakhalina and Anastasia Pozdnyakova of Russia, who posted 323.61, winning Silver.

It was confirmed in January 2011 that Guo had decided to retire, and she would not compete in the 2012 Summer Olympics. She was quoted as saying, "I think I have fulfilled my task, so the London Games is not what I have in mind now. The chances should be left to other talents in the team."

In 2016, she and her husband Kenneth Fok participated in The Amazing Race China 3, based on a CBS's travel-reality program of the same name. After competing ten Olympic-themed legs, they emerged as the winning team of the season.

== Personal life ==
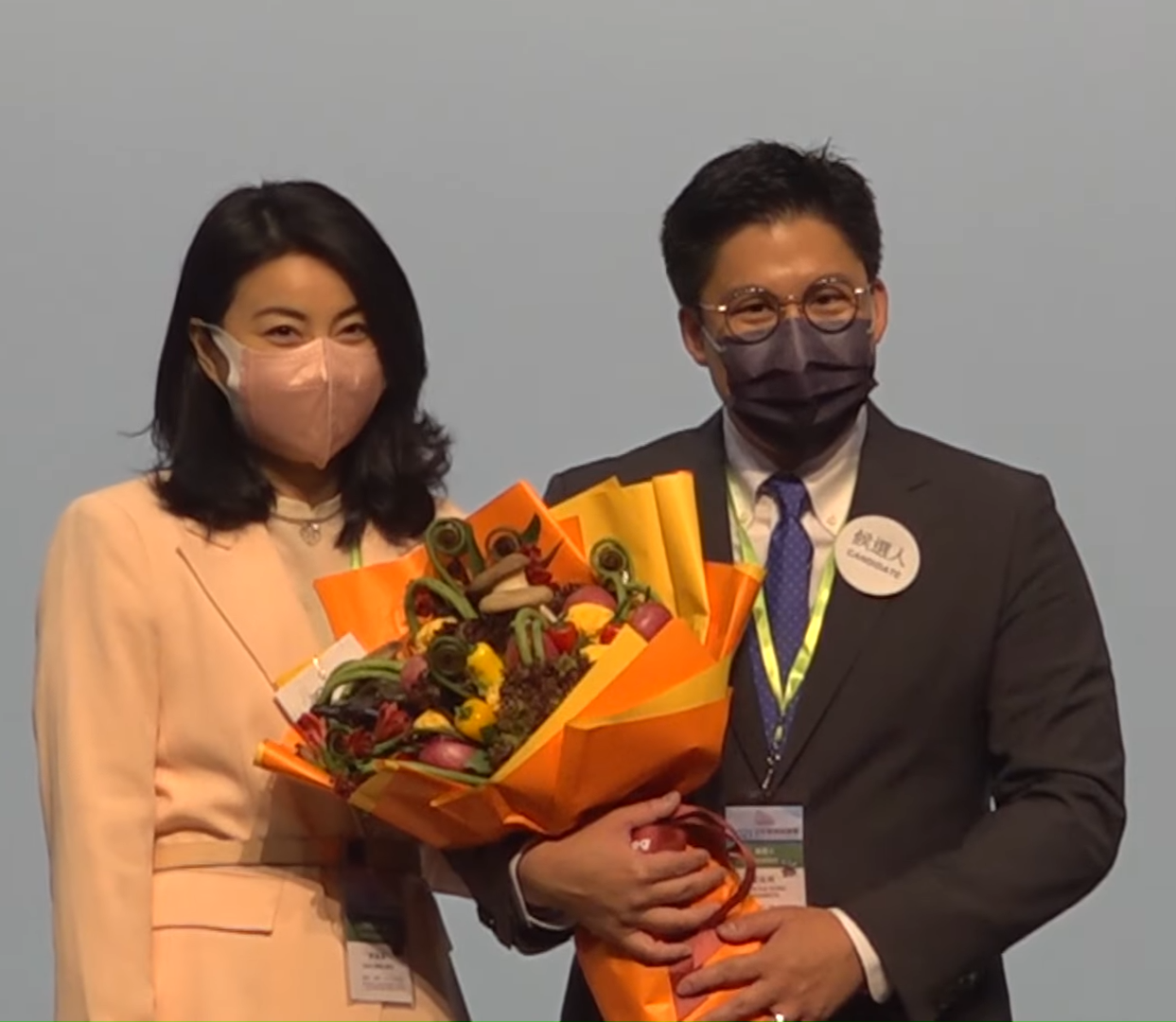
Guo with her husband Kenneth Fok in 2020

Guo's social activities after the Athens Olympics were the subject of scrutiny in Mainland Chinese and Hong Kong media news outlets. Guo made entertainment headlines in China when the paparazzi published a photograph of her dining with Kenneth Fok Kai-kong, the grandson of Hong Kong tycoon Henry Fok. Guo did not deny the relationship, and has been photographed many times with Kenneth Fok in public.

The couple married in Hong Kong on November 8, 2012. On August 27, 2013, Guo gave birth to a baby boy. She had a second baby, a girl, on April 21, 2017, and a third baby, another daughter, on January 1, 2019.

During Guo's history in diving, including long-term high-pressure training, damaged her knees, her retina and contributed to her myopia. In September 2008, Guo had to undergo surgery to repair a detached retina in both her eyes and her surgery was undertaken by Hong Kong ophthalmologist Dennis Lam. Earlier in 2001, she underwent surgery to repair a detached retina in her right eye, but spent only a few months out of the water. Since then, her eyesight has declined markedly.

== Major achievements ==
- 1995 World Cup – 1st Synchronized Platform & 3m Synchronized Springboard
- 1996 Olympic Games – 5th Platform
- 1998 World Championships – 2nd 3m Springboard
- 1999 World Cup – 1st 3m Synchronized Springboard; 3rd 3m Springboard
- 2000 World Cup – 1st 3m Springboard; 2nd 3m Synchronized Springboard
- 2000 Olympic Games – 2nd 3m Springboard & Synchronized Springboard
- 2001 World Championships – 1st 3m Springboard & Synchronized Springboard
- 2002 World Cup – 1st 1m & 3m Springboard; 2nd 3m Synchronized Springboard
- 2002 Asian Games – 1st 3m Springboard & Synchronized Springboard
- 2003 FINA Diving Grand Prix (Australia/China) – 1st 3m Springboard & Synchronized Springboard
- 2003 World Championships – 1st 3m Springboard & Synchronized Springboard
- 2004 World Cup – 1st 3m Synchronized Springboard; 2nd 3m Springboard
- 2004 Olympic Games – 1st 3m Springboard & Synchronized Springboard
- 2005 World Championships – 1st 3m Springboard & Synchronized Springboard
- 2006 Asian Games – 1st 3m Synchronized Springboard
- 2007 World Championships – 1st 3m Springboard & Synchronized Springboard
- 2008 Olympic Games 1st Women's 3m Synchronised Springboard
- 2008 Olympic Games 1st Women's 3m Springboard
- 2009 World Championships – 1st 3m Springboard & Synchronized Springboard
