= Diving at the 2002 Commonwealth Games =

- Venue: Manchester Aquatics Centre
- Location: Manchester, England
- Dates: 25 to 27 July

Diving at the 2002 Commonwealth Games was the 17th appearance of Diving at the Commonwealth Games. Competition was held in Manchester, England, from 25 to 27 July 2002.

The diving events were held at the Manchester Aquatics Centre.

There were six medal events: three events for both men and women. Australia topped the medal table by virtue of winning three gold medals.

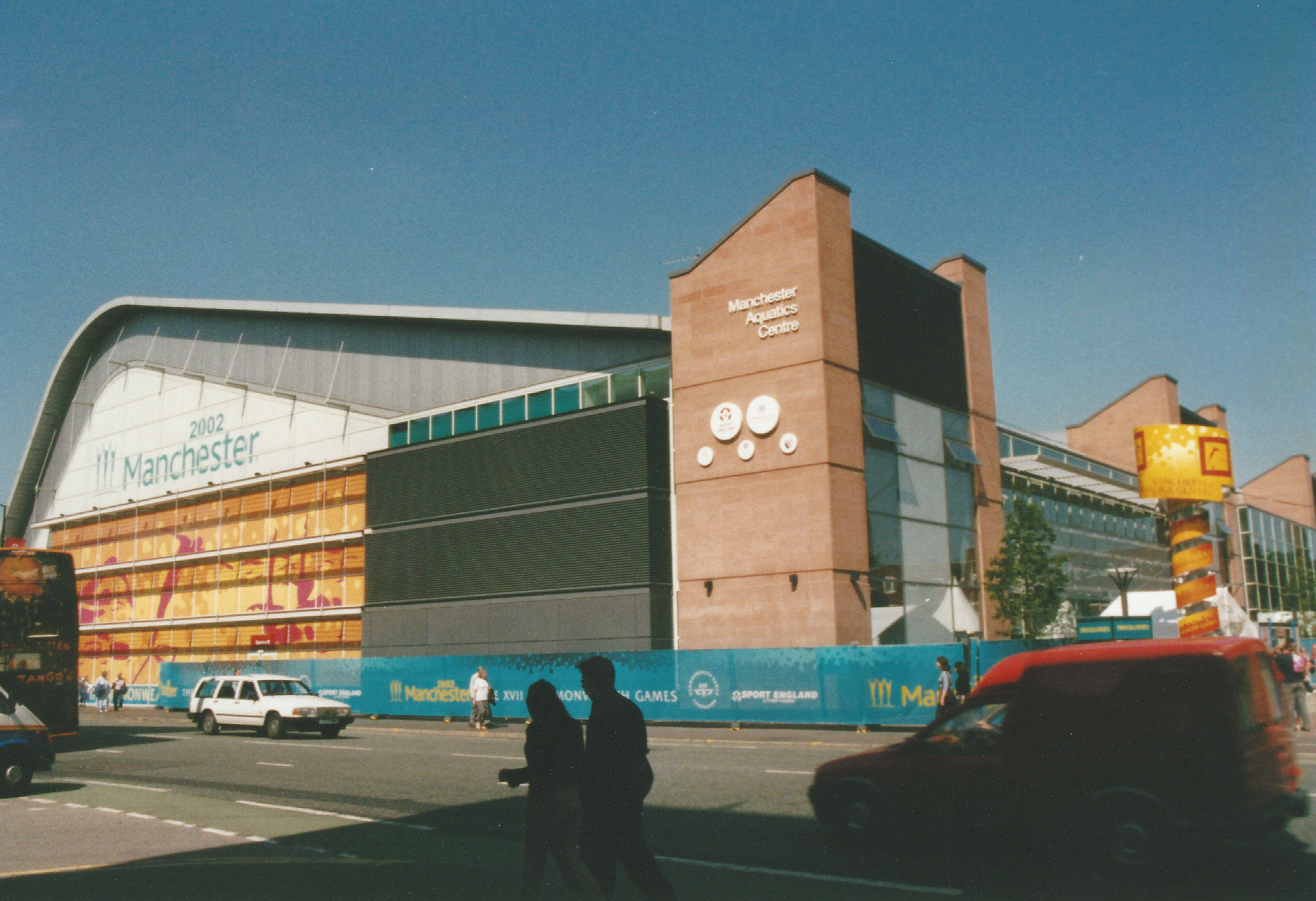
Manchester Aquatics Centre during the Games

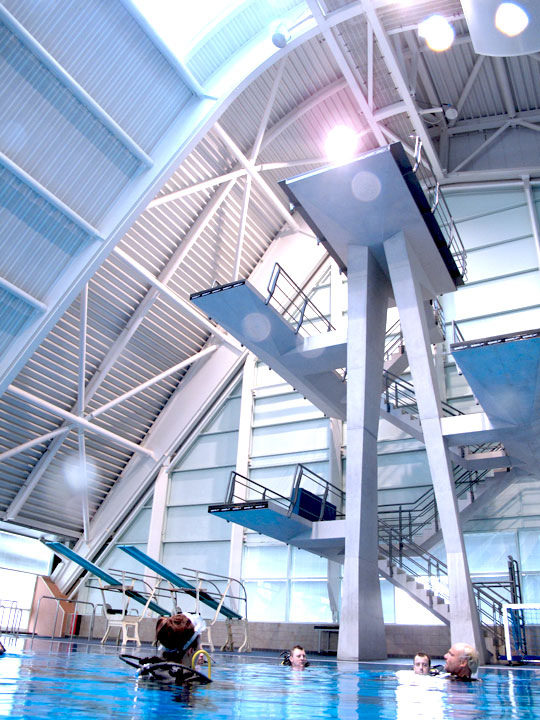
The diving facility

== Medal table ==
* Host nation (England)

Rank	Nation	Gold	Silver	Bronze	Total
1	Australia	3	0	2	5
2	Canada	2	3	2	7
3	England*	1	3	2	6
Totals (3 entries)		6	6	6	18

== Medallists ==
Event	Gold	Silver	Bronze
1m springboard	Alexandre Despatie; Canada	Tony Ally; England	Steven Barnett; Australia
3m springboard	Alexandre Despatie; Canada	Tony Ally; England	Robert Newbery; Australia
10m platform	Peter Waterfield; England	Leon Taylor; England	Alexandre Despatie; Canada

=== Women's events ===
Event	Gold	Silver	Bronze
1m springboard	Irina Lashko; Australia	Blythe Hartley; Canada	Jane Smith; England
3m springboard	Irina Lashko; Australia	Émilie Heymans; Canada	Jane Smith; England
10m platform	Loudy Tourky; Australia	Émilie Heymans; Canada	Blythe Hartley; Canada

== Results ==
=== Men's 1 metre springboard ===
Pos	Athlete	Time
1	(Canada) Alexandre Despatie	404.55
2	(England) Tony Ally	386.37
3	(Australia) Steven Barnett	382.65
4	(Australia) Robert Newbery	377.37
5	(Canada) Philippe Comtois	367.17
6	(England) Mark Shipman	349.86
7	(England) Peter Waterfield	359.94 (SF)
8	(Australia) Matthew Lawrence Cooper	332.79 (SF)
9	(Canada) Jeff Liberty	309.15 (SF)

=== Men's 3 metres springboard ===
Pos	Athlete	Time
1	(Canada) Alexandre Despatie	474.60
2	(England) Tony Ally	455.67
3	(Australia) Robert Newbery	441.84
4	(Canada) Philippe Comtois	437.25
5	(Australia) Steven Barnett	407.40
6	(Canada) Jeff Liberty	400.41
7	(England) Peter Waterfield	379.62
8	(Australia) Mathew Helm	376.98
9	(Malaysia) Nor Aznizal Najib	368.10
10	(England) Mark Shipman	366.39
11	(Malaysia) Rosshari Sham Roslan	297.69

=== Men's 10 metres platform ===
Pos	Athlete	Time
1	(England) Peter Waterfield	690.30
2	(England) Leon Taylor	689.82
3	(Canada) Alexandre Despatie	689.79
4	(Australia) Robert Newbery	680.97
5	(Australia) Mathew Helm	670.53
6	(Malaysia) Nor Aznizal Najib	576.66
7	(Canada) Nicolas Leblanc	536.22
8	(Malaysia) Lap Bun Low	498.96
9	(Canada) Julio Abate	486.99

=== Women's 1 metre springboard ===
Pos	Athlete	Time
1	(Australia) Irina Lashko	302.82
2	(Canada) Blythe Hartley	287.04
3	(England) Jane Smith	274.71
4	(Australia) Rebecca Gilmore	257.43
5	(Canada) Émilie Heymans	256.83
6	(Canada) Melanie Rinaldi	240.15
7	(Australia) Liesl Ischia	231.42 (SF)
8	(Bermuda) Katura Horton-Perinchief	219.72 (SF)
9	(New Zealand) Anna Thomas	214.38 (SF)
10	(England) Sarah Soo	204.72 (SF)

=== Women's 3 metres springboard ===
Pos	Athlete	Time
1	(Australia) Irina Lashko	594.51
2	(Canada) Émilie Heymans	574.23
3	(England) Jane Smith	556.38
4	(Canada) Blythe Hartley	547.98
5	(Australia) Loudy Tourky	526.59
6	(Malaysia) Mun Yee Leong	476.13
7	(Canada) Melanie Rinaldi	460.14
8	(England) Sarah Soo	442.98
9	(New Zealand) Anna Thomas	424.08
10	(Bermuda) Katura Horton-Perinchief	412.44

=== Women's 10 metres platform ===
Pos	Athlete	Time
1	(Australia) Loudy Tourky	538.65
2	(Canada) Émilie Heymans	527.79
3	(Canada) Blythe Hartley	490.17
4	(England) Karen Smith	461.76
5	(Canada) Myriam Boileau	460.62
6	(Malaysia) Mun Yee Leong	441.69
7	(Australia) Rebecca Gilmore	431.43
8	(New Zealand) Charlotte Glynan	406.26
9	(Australia) Nicole Boukaram	395.76
10	(England) Stacie Powell	388.41
