= Diving at the 2000 Summer Olympics – Men's 3 metre springboard =

Men's 3 metre springboard at the Games of the XXVII Olympiad

Medalists
1st place, gold medalist(s)		Xiong Ni	China
2nd place, silver medalist(s)		Fernando Platas	Mexico
3rd place, bronze medalist(s)		Dmitri Sautin	Russia

The men's 3 metre springboard was one of eight diving events included in the Diving at the 2000 Summer Olympics programme.

The competition was split into three phases:

Preliminary round
25 September — Each diver performed a front dive, a back dive, a reverse dive, an inward dive, a twisting dive and a sixth free-choice dive from one of these groups. There were no limitations in degree of difficulty. The 18 divers with the highest total score advanced to the semi-final.
Semi-final
26 September — Each diver performed a front dive, a back dive, a reverse dive, an inward dive and a twisting dive. The overall difficulty degree was limited to 9.5. The 12 divers with the highest combined score from the semi-final and preliminary dives advanced to the final.
Final
26 September — Each diver performed a front dive, a back dive, a reverse dive, an inward dive, a twisting dive and a sixth free-choice dive from one of these groups. There were no limitations in difficulty degree. The final ranking was determined by the combined score from the final and semi-final dives.

== Results ==
Rank	Diver	Country	Preliminary		Semifinal				Final		
Rank	Diver	Country	Points	Rank	Points	Rank	Total	Rank	Points	Rank	Total
1st place, gold medalist(s)	Xiong Ni	China	457.38	1	230.40	4	687.78	1	478.32	1	708.72
2nd place, silver medalist(s)	Fernando Platas	Mexico	444.60	2	234.36	3	678.96	3	474.06	2	708.42
3rd place, bronze medalist(s)	Dmitri Sautin	Russia	444.51	3	240.24	1	684.75	2	462.96	3	703.20
4	Xiao Hailiang	China	419.91	5	235.92	2	655.83	5	435.12	4	671.04
5	Dean Pullar	Australia	406.65	8	222.78	9	629.43	8	424.62	5	647.40
6	Troy Dumais	United States	407.64	7	224.16	8	631.80	7	418.56	6	642.72
7	Mark Ruiz	United States	429.30	4	227.97	5	657.27	4	410.25	7	638.22
8	Ken Terauchi	Japan	389.88	11	226.89	6	616.77	9	407.58	8	634.47
9	Stefan Ahrens	Germany	385.50	12	218.67	12	604.17	11	400.50	9	619.17
10	Andreas Wels	Germany	414.84	6	224.97	7	639.81	6	391.56	10	616.53
11	Imre Lengyel	Hungary	382.98	13	222.60	10	605.58	10	390.87	11	613.47
12	Tony Ally	Great Britain	393.36	10	206.25	15	599.61	12	377.55	12	583.80
13	Alexandre Dobroskok	Russia	377.34	17	221.28	11	598.62	13	did not advance		
14	Cassius Duran	Brazil	382.08	14	216.06	13	598.14	14	did not advance		
15	Robert Newbery	Australia	402.03	9	192.87	18	594.90	15	did not advance		
16	Donald Miranda	Italy	377.01	18	207.03	14	584.04	16	did not advance		
17	Rafael Álvarez	Spain	377.55	16	201.06	16	578.61	17	did not advance		
18	Yoendris Salazar	Cuba	377.58	15	197.52	17	575.10	18	did not advance		
19	Jeff Liberty	Canada	375.06	19	did not advance						
20	Jukka Piekkanen	Finland	373.41	20	did not advance						
21	Luis Villarroel	Venezuela	365.97	21	did not advance						
22	Yeoh Ken Nee	Malaysia	364.38	22	did not advance						
23	Vyacheslav Khamulkin	Belarus	357.03	23	did not advance						
24	Abel Sánchez	Peru	356.40	24	did not advance						
25	Eduard Safonov	Ukraine	355.05	25	did not advance						
26	Nicola Marconi	Italy	351.12	26	did not advance						
27	Dmytro Lysenko	Ukraine	345.54	27	did not advance						
28	Ramón Fumadó	Venezuela	343.89	28	did not advance						
29	Joel Rodríguez	Mexico	336.51	29	did not advance						
30	Joona Puhakka	Finland	332.58	30	did not advance						
31	Richard Frece	Austria	328.68	31	did not advance						
32	Thomas Bimis	Greece	324.72	32	did not advance						
33	José Miguel Gil	Spain	318.72	33	did not advance						
34	Kwon Kyung-min	South Korea	318.45	34	did not advance						
35	Gabriel Chereches	Romania	318.27	35	did not advance						
36	Nikolaos Siranidis	Greece	317.88	36	did not advance						
37	Erick Fornaris	Cuba	313.86	37	did not advance						
38	Evan Stewart	Zimbabwe	313.53	38	did not advance						
39	Jaroslav Makohin	Czech Republic	311.67	39	did not advance						
40	Frédéric Pierre	France	310.74	40	did not advance						
41	Juan Urán	Colombia	308.10	41	did not advance						
42	Alisher Seitov	Kazakhstan	307.62	42	did not advance						
43	Meerit Insawang	Thailand	306.24	43	did not advance						
44	Zardo Domenios	Philippines	300.42	44	did not advance						
45	Jean-Romain Delaloye	Switzerland	292.68	45	did not advance						
46	Mark Shipman	Great Britain	285.90	46	did not advance						
47	Pak Yong-ryong	North Korea	271.47	47	did not advance						
48	Yu Yuet	Hong Kong	227.64	48	did not advance						
49	Chen Han-hung	Chinese Taipei	188.46	49	did not advance						

== Sources ==
- Sydney Organising Committee for the Olympic Games (SOCOG) (2001). Official Report of the XXVII Olympiad - Volume Three: Results (Diving) (pdf) (in English and French). Sydney, New South Wales: Sydney Organising Committee for the Olympic Games (SOCOG). pp. 27–40. ISBN 0-9579616-1-8. OCLC 49687523.
