= 2024 Southport stabbings =

2024 mass stabbing in North West England

- Location of the Hart Space within Southport
- Location: 53.6424°N 2.9854°W; Hart Street, Southport, Merseyside, United Kingdom
- Date: 29 July 2024; 2 years ago c. 11:47 (BST (UTC+1))
- Target: Children at a dance workshop
- Attack type: Mass stabbing
- Weapon: Kitchen knife
- Deaths: 3
- Injuries: 10
- Perpetrator: Axel Rudakubana
- Coroner: Julie Goulding
- Convictions: Murder (3 counts); Attempted murder (10 counts); Possession of a bladed article
- Sentence: Detained at His Majesty's pleasure, with a minimum of 52 years
- Judge: Julian Goose

On 29 July 2024, a mass stabbing targeting young girls occurred at the Hart Space, a dance studio in the Meols Cop area of Southport, Merseyside, United Kingdom. Seventeen-year-old Axel Rudakubana killed three children and injured ten others at a Taylor Swift–themed yoga and dance workshop attended by 26 children. Two girls died at the scene and one the following day in hospital. Eight other children were injured, and two adults were taken to hospital in a critical condition.

The day after the stabbing, rioters clashed with police in Southport and damaged a mosque after misinformation about the attacker's identity – which had not yet been publicly released – was spread online. Over the next few days, mass anti-immigration protests and riots spread nationwide.

Rudakubana was arrested at the scene. He was charged with three counts of murder, ten counts of attempted murder, and possession of a bladed article. He was later separately charged under the Biological Weapons Act 1974 and Terrorism Act 2000 in relation to the possession of ricin and a military study of an Al-Qaeda training manual. He pleaded guilty to all 16 charges on 20 January 2025, when his trial was due to begin, having initially entered a not-guilty plea. On 23 January 2025, Rudakubana was sentenced to life imprisonment, with a minimum term of 52 years. No motive for the stabbings was identified; the prosecution suggested that the motivation could have been "the commission of mass murder as an end in itself" and no evidence of terrorism was found.

After Rudakubana's guilty pleas, it emerged that he had a history of violent and concerning behaviour and had been referred to the Home Office anti-extremism programme Prevent three times between 2019 and 2021, but was not accepted into the scheme as no terrorist ideology was identified. Prime Minister Keir Starmer promised to overhaul terrorism laws to include non-ideological acts of violence, and appointed David Anderson to lead a review of the Prevent programme.

== Background ==
The Hart Space, where the attack occurred, was a community studio venue on Hart Street in Meols Cop, Southport, about a mile east of the town centre. It hosted yoga, dance, pregnancy, and baby and toddler classes. It was on the first floor of Norwood Business Park, a building which it shared with an office on the ground floor.

The workshop was organised by yoga instructor Leanne Lucas and dance teacher Heidi Liddle. Lucas announced the class in an Instagram post on 7 July, advertised as a yoga, dance, and bracelet-making workshop themed around the music of Taylor Swift. The workshop was aimed at children in Year 2 to Year 6 (ages 6–11), and was being held in the first whole week of the summer holidays, scheduled for 29 July between 10:00 and 12:00 BST. The event was sold-out by 18 July, with 26 children booked onto the workshop.

== Attack ==
CCTV footage of Axel Rudakubana on the morning of 29 July, walking to a bus stop where he would be picked up by a taxi and taken to the Hart Space

Shortly before 11:45, Axel Rudakubana arrived at Hart Street by taxi, which he had booked under the false name 'Simon'. He asked the driver to direct him to 34A Hart Street, then left the vehicle without paying the fare and began walking down the alley towards the Hart Space.

Wearing a surgical mask and green hoodie and armed with a 20-centimetre-long (8 in) chef's knife, Rudakubana entered the building at 11:45 through the front door, which was unlocked, and walked up the flight of stairs to the studio. Lucas did not initially realise Rudakubana was armed, and thought he was there to collect a child.

Rudakubana began stabbing children at random, moving "quickly" throughout the room while remaining silent. Lucas realised he was attacking the children only when he moved on to her and stabbed her in her spine, head, ribs, lung and shoulder blade. Lucas and Liddle tried to shield children from Rudakubana; Lucas ushered some children out of the venue via a fire exit while Liddle hid a child in a bathroom. Over half the children, left on their own, were able to help each other and find safety. Many found safety at a local house. Lucas called 999 and sent others down the main stairs into the car park, telling them to run away once outside. One girl was pulled back inside and stabbed by Rudakubana while attempting to leave the building; she collapsed outside but survived. Merseyside Police received the first emergency call at 11:47, and emergency services were dispatched. North West Ambulance Service (NWAS) received their first call a minute later.

Jonathan Hayes, who was working in an office in the same building, ran into the studio three minutes after hearing screams and encountered Rudakubana on the landing, crouching over the body of a child. Hayes retreated but Rudakubana followed him into his office and swiped at him and he was stabbed in the leg and fell to the ground.

Members of the public helped those who had escaped from the building. Marcin Tyjon and Joel Verite were on Hart Street when they encountered a group of children, as well as Lucas, who herself had been stabbed five times and was covered in blood and screaming that someone was stabbing children inside the building. Tyjon administered CPR to Alice da Silva Aguiar, while Verite ran to the building and saw Rudakubana holding the knife.

The first police officer on scene arrived at 11:57. After backup arrived, an officer with a taser entered the studio with Verite. They encountered Rudakubana standing over Bebe King's body, still holding the knife. After being ordered to drop the knife, Rudakubana co-operated and was arrested by two officers while Verite carried King's body outside.

Emergency services quickly declared a major incident as armed response vehicles, thirteen ambulances, the fire service, and units from Midlands Air Ambulance, Great North Air Ambulance, and North West Air Ambulance were dispatched to the scene. Specialist hazardous area response and medical emergency response incident units also responded. Merseyside Police imposed an Emergency Restriction of Flying to stop aircraft – including helicopters and drones – from flying without permission.

== Victims ==
Six-year-old Bebe King and seven-year-old Elsie Dot Stancombe died at the scene, and nine-year-old Alice da Silva Aguiar died in hospital the following day. Eight children and two adults were treated for injuries by the North West Ambulance Service (NWAS). Six of the eight children and both adults – Lucas and Hayes – were in a critical condition following the stabbings.

Casualties were taken to Alder Hey Children's Hospital, which declared a major incident, as well as Aintree University Hospital, Southport and Formby District General Hospital, Ormskirk District General Hospital, and Royal Manchester Children's Hospital. The three girls who were killed in the attack were named on 30 July.

The last injured child to be discharged from hospital went home on 8 August, ten days after the stabbing. On 15 August, a family friend reported that Lucas had been readmitted to hospital due to breathing issues. She underwent lung surgery before being discharged again in late August.

== Perpetrator ==
Axel Muganwa Rudakubana was born on 7 August 2006 in Cardiff, Wales. His parents, Alphonse Rudakubana and Laetitia Muzayire, are Evangelical Christian Tutsi. They moved from Rwanda to the UK in 2002. Rudakubana is a British citizen, and has an older brother. The family lived in the Thornhill area of Cardiff before moving to the Southport area in 2013, settling in Banks, a large village on the north-eastern outskirts of Southport. Neighbours described Rudakubana as quiet and unassuming, with some saying they "very rarely" saw him.

Rudakubana was involved in acting and drama; he was part of a musical theatre group and took acting classes at the Pauline Quirke Academy. In 2018, aged 11, he was featured in a BBC Children in Need promotional video dressed as the Tenth Doctor. Following the attack and subsequent revealing of Rudakubana's identity, the BBC removed the advert featuring him from its platforms. Ology Kids Casting, who cast him for the advert, also deleted all references to him from their social media.

=== Secondary schooling and concerns raised ===
Rudakubana attended Range High School in Formby from 2017. He first became known to officials in 2019, initially due to anxiety and social isolation but then due to increasing concerns over his behaviour. On 4 October 2019, aged 13 and in Year 9, he contacted Childline and asked "what should I do if I want to kill somebody?" and in the following days, explained he wanted to kill someone who was bullying him at school. The incident was referred to the police, who visited him shortly afterwards. Rudakubana had been temporarily excluded from school by this point, and he was expelled after he disclosed that he had taken a knife to school on about 10 occasions.

From 17 October 2019, Rudakubana attended The Acorns School in Ormskirk, for students with special educational needs. During his admission meeting, Rudakubana was asked why he had taken a knife into his previous school, to which he replied "to use it." In November 2019, Rudakubana was referred to the anti-extremism Prevent scheme for researching school shootings during an IT class – the first of what would eventually be three referrals over the following eighteen months.

On 11 December 2019, Rudakubana booked a taxi to take him back to Range High, where he threatened pupils and teachers with a hockey stick on which he had written their names. He struck one pupil with the hockey stick, breaking their wrist. When the police arrived, a knife was found in Rudakubana's backpack. In February 2020 he was charged with, and pleaded guilty to, assault occasioning actual bodily harm, possession of an offensive weapon, and possession of a bladed article. A referral order was imposed. Following this incident, The Acorns School refused to have Rudakubana on their premises, and instead sent him schoolwork to complete at home, which he failed to do. He returned to school in July 2020 under a two-to-one supervision, but stopped attending again in May 2021, following reports of incidents at home.

Rudakubana was diagnosed with autism spectrum disorder in February 2021. He was referred to Prevent twice more in early 2021; once in February for uploading two images of Libyan dictator Muammar Gaddafi to Instagram, and again in April after a teacher noticed he had left two internet tabs open researching the London Bridge terror attacks on a school computer during a lesson. Police were involved with Rudakubana multiple times over the following year due to various incidents: once in November 2021, where Rudakubana kicked his father and damaged his car in an argument; in March 2022, where his mother reported him missing before a bus driver called the police on him for failing to pay his fare; and again in May 2022 in an argument where Rudakubana was denied access to his computer. From September 2022, he was enrolled for sixth form at Presfield High School & Specialist College in Churchtown, mostly via home visits by staff, who were sometimes accompanied by the police.

On 22 July 2024, one week before the Southport attack, Rudakubana used a pseudonym to book a taxi to take him to Range High School, minutes before the school broke-up for the summer holidays. He was wearing the same outfit – a green hoodie and a surgical mask – that he would wear to the Hart Space attack a week later. However, his father spotted him and pleaded with the taxi driver not to take Rudakubana to his former school. After a discussion with his father, he returned to the house. The prosecution later assessed that the circumstances were "unlikely to be a coincidence" and that Rudakubana had originally planned an attack at Range High School but the attempt was foiled by his father.

=== Arrest and trial ===
Rudakubana was arrested at the scene of the attack on suspicion of murder and attempted murder. On 31 July, Rudakubana was charged with three counts of murder, ten counts of attempted murder, and one count of possession of a bladed article. In England and Wales reporting restrictions in place at the time of the attack prevented the public disclosure of the identity of a suspect aged under 18 (unless or until authorised by a court). His identity was therefore initially protected, but reporting restrictions were later lifted on 1 August by Liverpool Crown Court, citing concerns over the lack of confirmed identity fuelling misinformation and riots. The recorder overturning the restrictions stated that continuing to prevent reporting of Rudakubana's name risked more unrest when he turned 18 on 7 August and his identity would have become publicly available.

Merseyside Police did not identify a motive at the time, and on the day of the attack they said that they were not treating the incident as terror-related.

In October 2024, Rudakubana was charged under the Biological Weapons Act 1974 and Terrorism Act 2000 for possession and production of ricin and a PDF copy of a military study of an al-Qaeda training manual. Rudakubana was charged with production of a biological toxin in violation of Section 1 of the Biological Weapons Act 1974. The PDF file found by Merseyside Police on Rudakubana's computer was titled Military Studies in the Jihad Against the Tyrants – the al-Qaida Training Manual; Rudakubana had been in possession of the document as early as 29 August 2021.

According to a senior official later interviewed by The Guardian, Rudakubana watched graphic videos of murders and was "absolutely obsessed" with violence and genocide, including the Rwandan genocide, Adolf Hitler and Genghis Khan. On his devices were found media relating to violent themes such as the Mau Mau rebellion; "clan cleansing" in Somalia; punishments against slaves; and wars including the Gaza–Israel conflict, the Russian invasion of Ukraine, the Sudanese civil war, the Korean War, the Iraq War, and the Balkan Wars. Graphic images of dead bodies, victims of torture and beheadings; and cartoons depicting killing, violence and rape, or which insulted or mocked different religions – including Islam, Judaism and Christianity – were also found on his devices. Rudakubana had purchased the knife used in the killings two weeks earlier on 13 July 2024.

In December 2024, Rudakubana's not guilty pleas were entered on his behalf; during the video link with Liverpool Crown Court, he was mute of malice. A four-week trial was scheduled for January 2025. As his trial was due to begin, on 20 January 2025, he pleaded guilty to all sixteen charges against him: three counts of murder, ten counts of attempted murder, one count of possession of a knife, one count of ricin production, and one terror-related charge. In advance of Rudakubana's sentencing, the judge, Julian Goose, said that a life sentence was inevitable.

Speaking outside court after Rudakubana had pleaded guilty, Ursula Doyle of the Crown Prosecution Service called the attack a "meticulously planned rampage" that had left an enduring mark on the local community and the nation for "its savagery and senselessness". She said that Rudakubana had been obsessed with violence and had shown no sign of remorse.

After Rudakubana's guilty plea, the media were permitted to publish details of his background. It was revealed that he had been referred on three occasions to the Prevent scheme due to his interest in violence but, although his behaviour was considered to be of concern, he was not accepted onto the programme as there was no evidence of terrorist ideology. After his arrest, an emergency review concluded that Prevent had followed the correct procedures at the time. It also emerged that, in the five years preceding the attack, the police, the youth justice system, social care authorities and mental health services had been involved with him. The prosecution concluded by stating that they could not identify the murders as terrorism, but suggested that Rudakubana's motivation may have been "the commission of mass murder as an end in itself".

In televised proceedings, Rudakubana was sentenced to life imprisonment at Liverpool Crown Court on 23 January 2025 with a minimum term of 52 years' imprisonment, one of the lengthiest minimum sentences ever handed down in British legal history, and which is set to keep him imprisoned until at least 2076 and the age of 70. (Note: Rudakubana was also sentenced to concurrently serve 18 years for eight counts of attempted murder of children, 16 years for two counts of attempted murder of adults, 12 years for production of biological toxin, and 18 months each for possession of a bladed article and possession of document likely to be useful to a person preparing an act of terrorism.) The start of the sentencing was twice loudly interrupted by Rudakubana pleading for medical assistance. After a warning from the judge he was removed from the courtroom. His age at the time of the murders meant that he could not be sentenced to a whole life order, for which a person must be aged at least 21. The Police, Crime, Sentencing and Courts Act 2022 allows offenders aged 18–20 to be sentenced to whole life orders in exceptional circumstances, and Goose stated that if Rudakubana had been 18 years old at the time of the offence then he would have been compelled to issue a whole life order. Rudakubana may not apply for parole before 2077, and Goose said that he is unlikely ever to be released.

On 4 February 2025, a further hearing was held to correct a legal error at his initial sentencing. Rudakubana refused to attend, remaining in his cell. At the hearing, his sentence was amended to "detained at His Majesty's pleasure"; this is the equivalent to a life sentence for those under 18, as Rudakubana was at the time of the attack. The minimum length of his sentence remained the same. Patrick Hurley, the MP for Southport, had asked the Attorney General Lord Hermer to refer the sentence to the Court of Appeal as "unduly lenient". Many similar requests were also made but, on 15 February 2025, Hermer announced that the case would not be referred.

On 16 February it was reported that UK police, in their efforts to recover the web browsing history from Rudakubana's computer, were being assisted by the United States Department of Justice and the FBI.

=== Imprisonment ===
Since his conviction in January 2025, Rudakubana has been imprisoned at the high-security Category A prison HMP Belmarsh in London to serve his sentence. Rudakubana has been held in a form of segregation or isolation unit; the Prison Officers' Association suggested that such segregation would protect him against reprisal attacks from other inmates due to his violence against children.

On 26 January 2025, claims were shared on X that Rudakubana had been attacked in his cell at Strangeways prison in Manchester by two inmates. The Ministry of Justice (MoJ) clarified that Rudakubana was imprisoned at Belmarsh, and had not been attacked.

On 8 May 2025, Rudakubana is alleged to have attacked a prison officer by throwing boiling water over them through the hatch in his cell door. The officer was taken to hospital as a precautionary measure and was discharged on the same day. It was reported that Rudakubana's supervision was downgraded in the weeks before the attack. Following this incident, Rudakubana's privileges were reduced to the "minimum legal entitlements", which significantly reduced the amount of time he could be out of his cell and his access to amenities.

In July 2026, Rudakubana was moved to Broadmoor Hospital, a high-security psychiatric hospital in Berkshire. The MoJ stated that he had been assessed under the Mental Health Act and will remain at Broadmoor until he is deemed fit to return to prison. Later that month, Rudakubana was charged with four offences: two counts of assaulting an emergency worker, one of attempted grievous bodily harm, and one of unauthorised possession of an offensive weapon in prison.

== Aftermath ==
=== Official responses ===
==== Prior to guilty plea ====
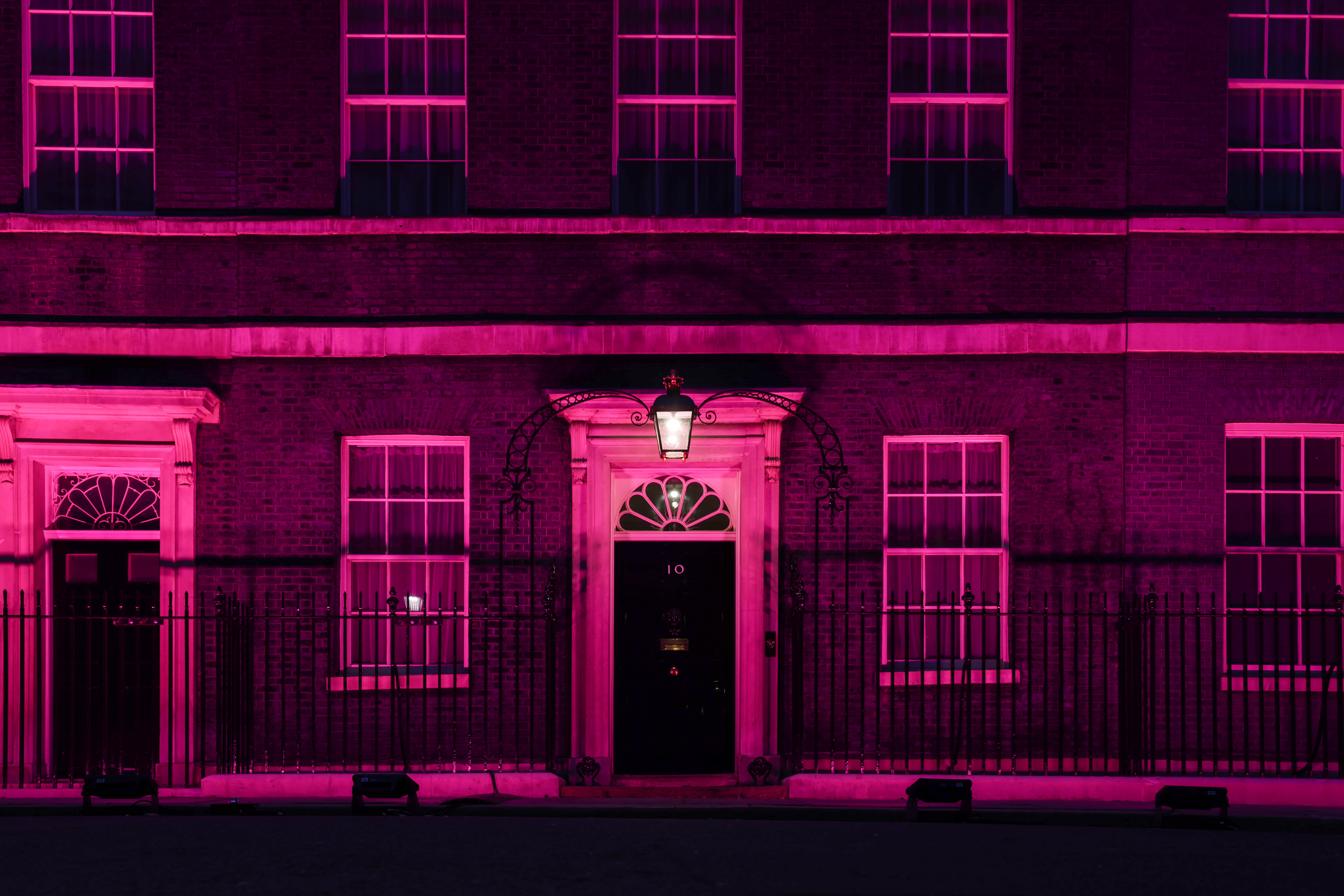
10 Downing Street lit pink in tribute to the victims on 2 August

Prime Minister Keir Starmer described the incident as horrendous and shocking, and thanked emergency services for their swift response. Speaking in the House of Commons, Home Secretary Yvette Cooper stated that she was concerned by the incident and described the emergency services' response as courageous. Patrick Hurley stated that he was deeply concerned and hoped for the best possible outcomes to the casualties as well as praising local organisations that "stepped up to the plate" and urging against any online speculation over the event. Cooper additionally visited Southport the following morning to lay flowers and meet officials and community leaders. Starmer also visited the same day and laid flowers at the scene. He was heckled by some members of the public. On 2 August, 10 Downing Street was illuminated pink "as a mark of respect and solidarity".

Condolences were sent by King Charles III and Queen Camilla, as well as William, Prince of Wales and Catherine, Princess of Wales. The President of Portugal Marcelo Rebelo de Sousa, Portuguese Prime Minister Luís Montenegro, and the Regional Government of Madeira, sent condolences as Aguiar's parents had emigrated from Madeira to the UK.

King Charles visited Southport on 20 August, meeting with survivors of the attack and their families, local politicians, and emergency workers who responded to the incident. He also signed the book of condolence. The following day he held a private meeting at Clarence House in London with the bereaved families.

On 10 October the town was visited by the Prince and Princess of Wales, in the princess's first official visit since completing her treatment for cancer.

==== Post-guilty plea responses and public inquiry ====
After Rudakubana's guilty plea on 20 January 2025, Home Secretary Cooper announced a public inquiry, stating that the victims' families "needed answers about what had happened leading up to the attack". This was followed by Prime Minister Starmer's promise to overhaul terrorism laws to reflect the type of non-ideological killings characterised by individuals like Rudakubana, stressing the threat from “acts of extreme violence perpetrated by loners, misfits, young men in their bedroom, accessing all manner of material online, desperate for notoriety, sometimes inspired by traditional terrorist groups, but fixated on that extreme violence, seemingly for its own sake”.

Significant attention was drawn to Prevent for failing to accept referrals of Rudakubana on the basis of his lacking a terrorist ideology. Although an emergency review found that Prevent had followed correct procedures on each referral, Cooper concluded "that too much weight was placed on the absence of ideology" in the programme. Cooper announced that there would be a review on the threshold at which Prevent intervenes, with senior lawyer David Anderson being assigned by Starmer as the Independent Prevent Commissioner to perform the review.

On 24 January, the day after Rudakubana's sentencing, the Attorney General's Office reported that it had received a request to consider his sentence under the Unduly Lenient Sentence scheme. The attorney general declined to refer the sentence.

On 26 January, Cooper said that social media companies were "failing to act" on extreme content accessed by Rudakubana. She said that violent videos must be removed from social media platforms.

The parents of two of the victims, Stancombe and King, spoke publicly for the first time in an interview published in The Sunday Times on 8 February. The families said that they disagreed with the live televising of the judge's sentencing remarks, as they believed that it was inappropriate to broadcast details of the girls' injuries beyond the courtroom.

On 13 April 2026, the Southport Inquiry report was made public. It found that the stabbings could have been prevented, citing failures in agencies' information sharing and in Rudakubana's parents creating "significant obstacles" in his access to agencies, as well as their allowing him to procure weapons. The report also found that Joanne Hodson, the headteacher at the Acorns school where Rudakubana was enrolled had warned colleagues that he needed to be regularly searched for knives and described Rudakubana as "sinister, cold and calculating" in a draft education health and care plan. In response mental health care worker Samantha Steed accused Hodson of stereotyping Rudakubana as a "black boy with a knife" and the language Hodson used to describe Rudakubana was taken out of the draft plan. Hodson told the inquiry the accusation of stereotyping had "effectively shut me up". The inquiry chairman Sir Adrian Fulford concluded it was "unwise" of Steed to "raise issues of racial stereotyping" since "Mrs Hodson was raising a valid point about the need for a risk assessment", and "In those circumstances, Ms Steed should have sought to support Mrs Hodson's position".

=== Memorials and fundraisers ===
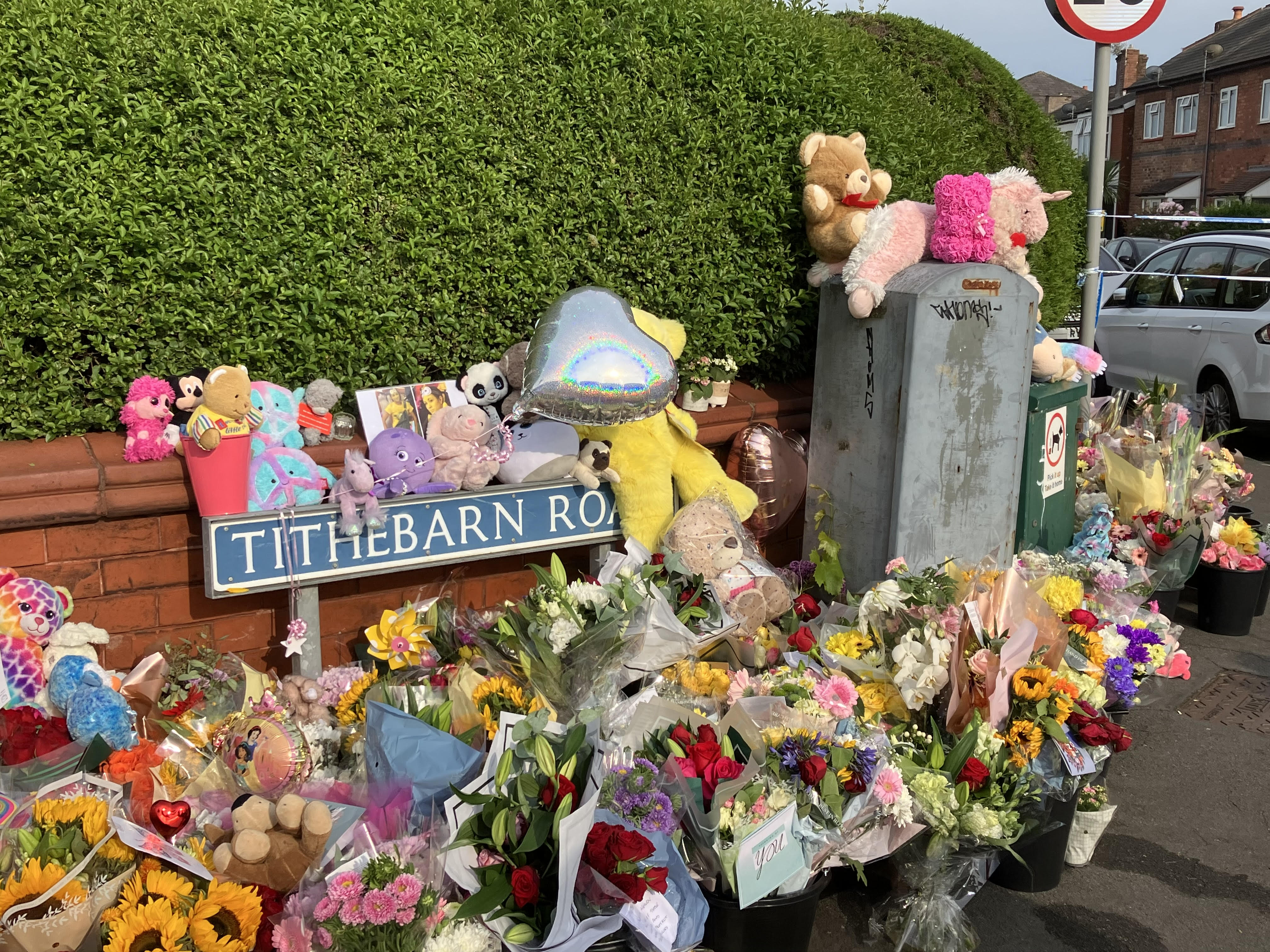
Tributes left at the corner of Hart Street and Tithebarn Road (pictured on 30 July)

A vigil was held outside the Atkinson in Eastbank Square on the evening of 30 July, with thousands of people in attendance. Flowers and handwritten notes were left there and near the scene of the attack.

Taylor Swift responded: "The horror of yesterday's attack in Southport is washing over me continuously and I'm just completely in shock [...] These were just little kids at a dance class. I am at a complete loss for how to ever convey my sympathies to these families." Swift later met with families of the victims, welcoming them backstage at her Eras Tour concerts in London.

Within a day of the incident, Swift's fans launched a 'Swifties for Southport' JustGiving page and raised over £300,000 for the Alder Hey Children's Charity. Fundraising pages were set up to support the families of the victims, which raised a combined total of over £200,000.

A service was held for Aguiar on 6 August at St Patrick's Catholic Church in Southport. Hundreds of people lined the streets of Southport for her funeral on 11 August. King's funeral was held privately in Southport on 17 August, and Stancombe's funeral took place in Birkdale on 23 August.

In September 2025, a refurbished playground was unveiled at Churchtown Primary School in memory of Aguiar and King, who both attended the school. More than 13,000 people donated money for the playground, reaching the £250,000 target in a month. The fathers of Aguiar and Stancombe ran the 2025 London Marathon with the school headteacher to raise funds for the playground, receiving a donation from William, Prince of Wales and Catherine, Princess of Wales, and a message of support from prime minister Keir Starmer.

=== Misinformation and riots ===
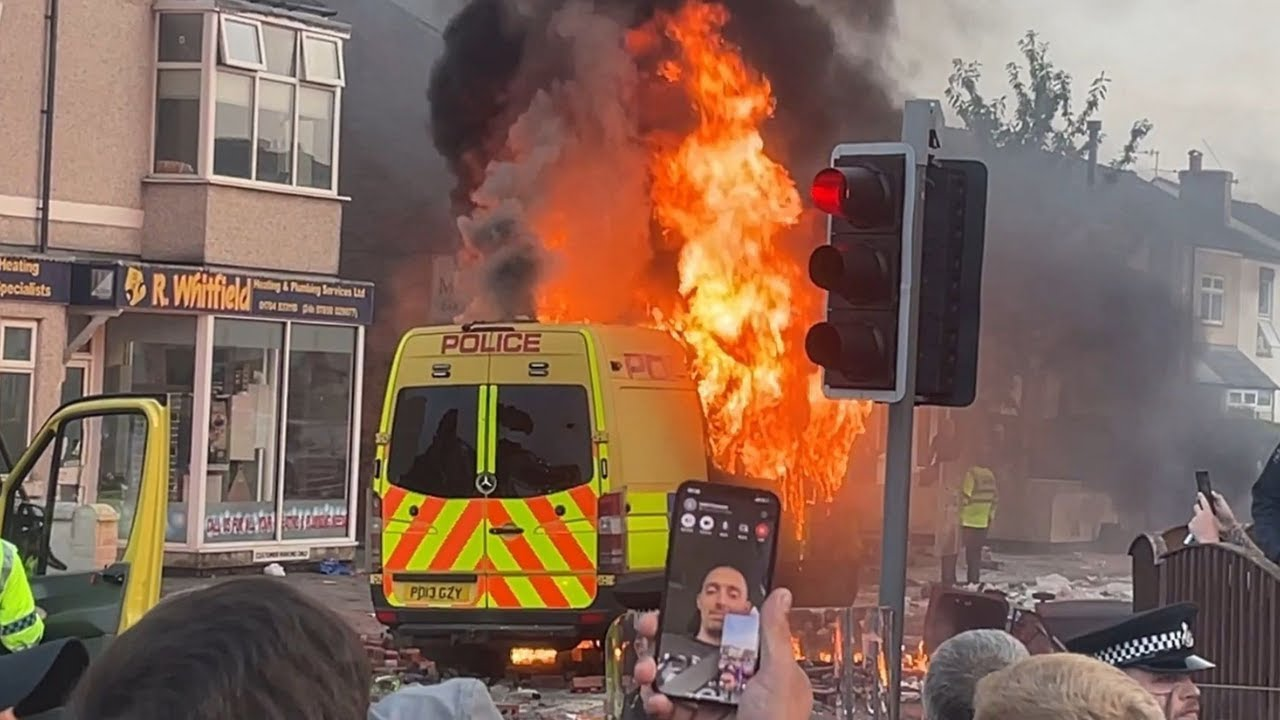
The riot at Southport Mosque on 30 July 2024

In the immediate aftermath of the attack, misinformation about the identity of the attacker began to spread widely on social media, including an incorrect name. Claims that the suspect was a Muslim migrant or asylum seeker were rapidly spread by right-wing accounts. The claims were propagated by Channel3Now, a news aggregation website with a past history of spreading misinformation.

On the evening of 30 July, the same evening as a vigil was held for the victims, hundreds of protesters gathered outside Southport Mosque on St Luke's Road, less than 400 metres (0.25 mi) from the scene of the attack. The protest quickly turned violent and people began attacking the mosque with bricks, bottles, and rocks, set a police vehicle on fire, and looted a corner shop. Merseyside Police believed the group to be supporters of the English Defence League, although the EDL has ceased to exist in a formal sense since 2013. Merseyside Police reported that 39 officers were injured; 27 were hospitalised and 8 sustained serious injuries.

The riot was widely condemned. Starmer said in a post on X that the group had "hijacked the vigil for the victims with violence and thuggery" and "insulted the community as it grieves", and that those involved would "feel the full force of the law". Hurley said on BBC Radio 4's Today that the rioters were not local residents, but were "thugs who'd got the train in". Dozens of local residents gathered on the morning of 31 July to clean up the destruction and repair damage. Over the next few days, protests and riots spread to towns and cities across England, and to Belfast in Northern Ireland, eventually leading to over 1,000 arrests.

=== Inquest ===
The inquest into the three deaths was opened at Bootle Town Hall on 7 August by senior coroner Julie Goulding. The inquest was adjourned pending the outcome of the judicial process.

=== Inspired incidents ===
In August 2024, a man in Christchurch, Dorset, stabbed a 9-year-old girl outside his home; he had read about the rioting in the aftermath of the stabbings and researched a local dance class. In June 2025, a Cardiff teenager who had saved images of Rudakubana on his phone and expressed his desire to commit a similar attack was arrested for plotting to bomb an Oasis concert. Two months later, another teenager in Kirkby was arrested after calling the police and telling them he wanted to reenact Rudakubana's attack; he had purchased knives.

== See also ==
- List of mass stabbing incidents (2020–present)
- List of mass stabbings by death toll
- 2024 Hainault sword attack – mass stabbing in London in which a 14-year-old boy was killed
- Murders of Bibaa Henry and Nicole Smallman
- 2026 Kingsbury High School stabbing
