= Birkdale School =

Location
- Oakholme Road; Sheffield, South Yorkshire, S10 3DH; England; 53.374510°N 1.504785°W

Information
- Type: Private school
- Motto: Res Non Verba (Actions not Words)
- Religious affiliation: Christian
- Established: 1904
- Founder: Maurice Asterley
- Department for Education URN: 107163 Tables
- Head Master: Ben Bowles
- Staff: ~200
- Gender: Co-educational
- Age: 4 to 18
- Enrolment: ~1,000 pupils (inc. Prep School)
- Houses: Griffiths, Asterley, Hall and Heeley.
- Colours: Red , Dark Blue
- Publication: The Birkdalian
- Former pupils: Old Birkdalians
- Partner Schools: Peace Garden School, Nepal
- Website: www.birkdaleschool.org.uk

Birkdale School is a co-educational private day school for pupils aged 4–18, in the city of Sheffield, South Yorkshire in England. Founded by Maurice Asterley, in 1904, the school provides education underpinned by a Christian ethos.

Birkdale is a member of the Headmasters' and Headmistresses' Conference, and is a registered charity, educating roughly 1000 students per annum. Previously a boys' school, since 1995 girls have been admitted to the sixth form, with the whole school becoming co-educational in September 2020, starting with the youngest four year groups.

== History ==
Birkdale was founded in 1904 by Maurice Asterley as a preparatory school for boys between the ages of 4 and 13 to provide a Christian education and takes its name from its first home, Birkdale House on Newbould Lane. The school moved in 1915 to the Oakholme building under Griffiths' leadership (1909–1939).

At the start of the Second World War, the school evacuated to Derbyshire under Roberts, Head Master in 1939. After the war, Roberts moved his pupils to Uttoxeter creating Brocksford Hall School, whilst twenty boys returned to Oakholme Road under Heeley in 1942 who later became Head Master in 1943.

== Buildings ==
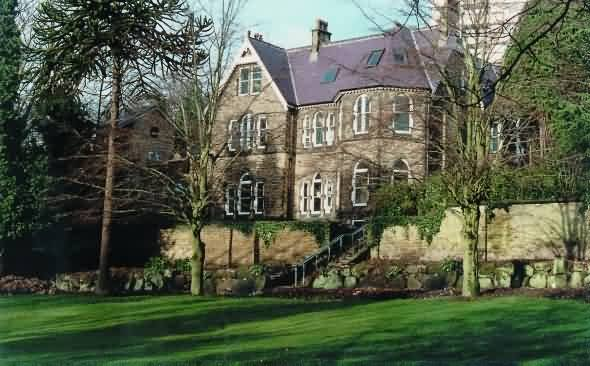
The Johnson Building

Birkdale School consists of a senior school and a prep school over 2 sites. The senior school has six main buildings: Johnson Building, Grayson Building, Endcliffe Building, Oakholme Building, Westbury Building, and the Science Block.

== Houses ==
There is a House system employed at Birkdale Senior School, four in total, each named after old Head Masters. Each house consists of a House Master who is a member of faculty, a House Captain who is a member of sixth form, and a dozen House Prefects also from the sixth form, chosen by faculty. Their roles consist of holding house assemblies and organising house events. The heads of school, as well as the sixth form prefects, operate independently from the house prefects.

House Name	Named After
Asterley	Maurice Asterley 1904–09
Griffiths	Alban Griffiths 1909–39
Heeley	Howard Heeley 1943-63
Hall	John Hall 1963-83

The Prep School had a slightly different house system, with a house dedicated to J.G. Roberts, Head Master 1933 – 43, and one to the family of Sir John Osborn, Conservative MP for Sheffield Hallam 1959 – 1987, of Osborn House, the current site of the Preparatory School. Martin House is named after Cyril Martin, who gained the Military Cross in the First World War and the George Cross in the Second World War. Westbury House was the fourth house. As of September 2020, the Prep department has adopted the same Houses as the Senior School.

== Administration ==
The headmaster is Ben Bowles. The previous headmaster was Peter Harris, who left at Easter 2025.

== Sport ==
Birkdale has its own playing fields, Castle Dyke, within a few miles of the main school site. There was a £2 million investment after acquiring a 125 year lease for the 30 acre Castle Dyke playing fields and the construction of a new sports pavilion, which opened in 2006. On campus, the school has a sports hall and attached gym.

During the 2007–08 school year, the U16 Rugby team reached the national quarter final of the Daily Mail Vase.

== Head Masters ==
Head Master	Years Active											
Head Master	1900s	1910s	1920s	1930s	1940s	1950s	1960s	1970s	1980s	1990s	2000s	2010s
Maurice Asterley	1904–09											
Alban Griffiths		1909–39										
J. G. Roberts				1939–43								
Howard Heeley						1943–1963						
John Hall							1963–83					
The Rev'd Michael Hepworth							1983–98					
Robert Court							1998–2010					
Dr Paul Owen							2010–2018					
Nicholas Pietrek							2018–2018					
Peter Harris							2019–					

== Nepal ==
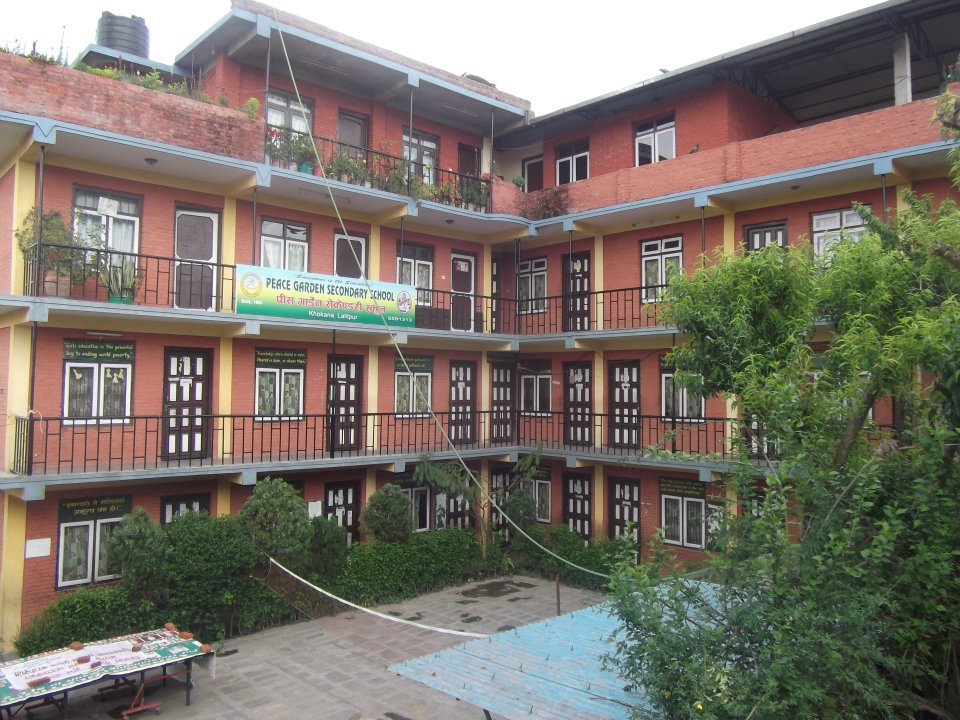
Peace Garden School, Nepal

As part of the school's charity projects it has developed links with some institutions in and around Kathmandu in Nepal. Most notable are the Peace Garden School, for which the school has helped raise money for a new school building, and a leper colony on the outskirts of Kathmandu, where Birkdale is helping to build new facilities and a new school.

== Notable alumni ==
- Cyril Martin GC, MC (1897–1973), soldier and George Cross recipient.
- Sir Rex Harrison (1908–1990), actor.
- Sir John Holbrook Osborn (1922–2015), MP for Sheffield Hallam 1959–87
- Sir Paul Kennedy, KC (born 1935), former Lord Justice of Appeal.
- Sir Michael Palin (born 1943), comedian, actor, traveller and writer.
- Bruce Dickinson (born 1958), musician.
- Sir Julian Goose (born 1961), High Court judge.
- Simon Johnson (born 1963), Nobel Prize winning economist.
- Mark Roe (born 1963), golfer.
- Lord Allan of Hallam (Formerly Richard Allan, MP) (born 1966), Liberal Democrat Peer.
- Richard Coyle (born 1972), actor.
- David Jennings (born 1972), composer.
- Justin Wilson (1978–2015), racing driver.
- Charlie Davies (born 1989), rugby union player.
- Stefan Wilson (born 1989), racing driver.
- Zhou Guanyu (born 1999), Formula 1 racing driver.
- Phoenix Laulu-Togaga'e (born 2003), rugby league player.
