= Silverdale School (disambiguation) =

Silverdale School is a high school in Sheffield, South Yorkshire, England.

Silverdale School may also refer to:

- Silverdale School, New Zealand, a primary school in Auckland, New Zealand
- Silverdale Primary School, a primary school in Silverdale, Lancashire, England
