= Cyril Martin =

Cyril Martin may refer to:

- Cyril Gordon Martin (1891–1980), English Victoria Cross recipient
- Cyril Martin (GC) (1897–1973), British George Cross recipient
- Cyril Martin (wrestler) (1928-2007), South African Olympic wrestler
