= Meols Cop =

Area of Southport, Merseyside, England

Coordinates: 53.6366°N 2.9714°W

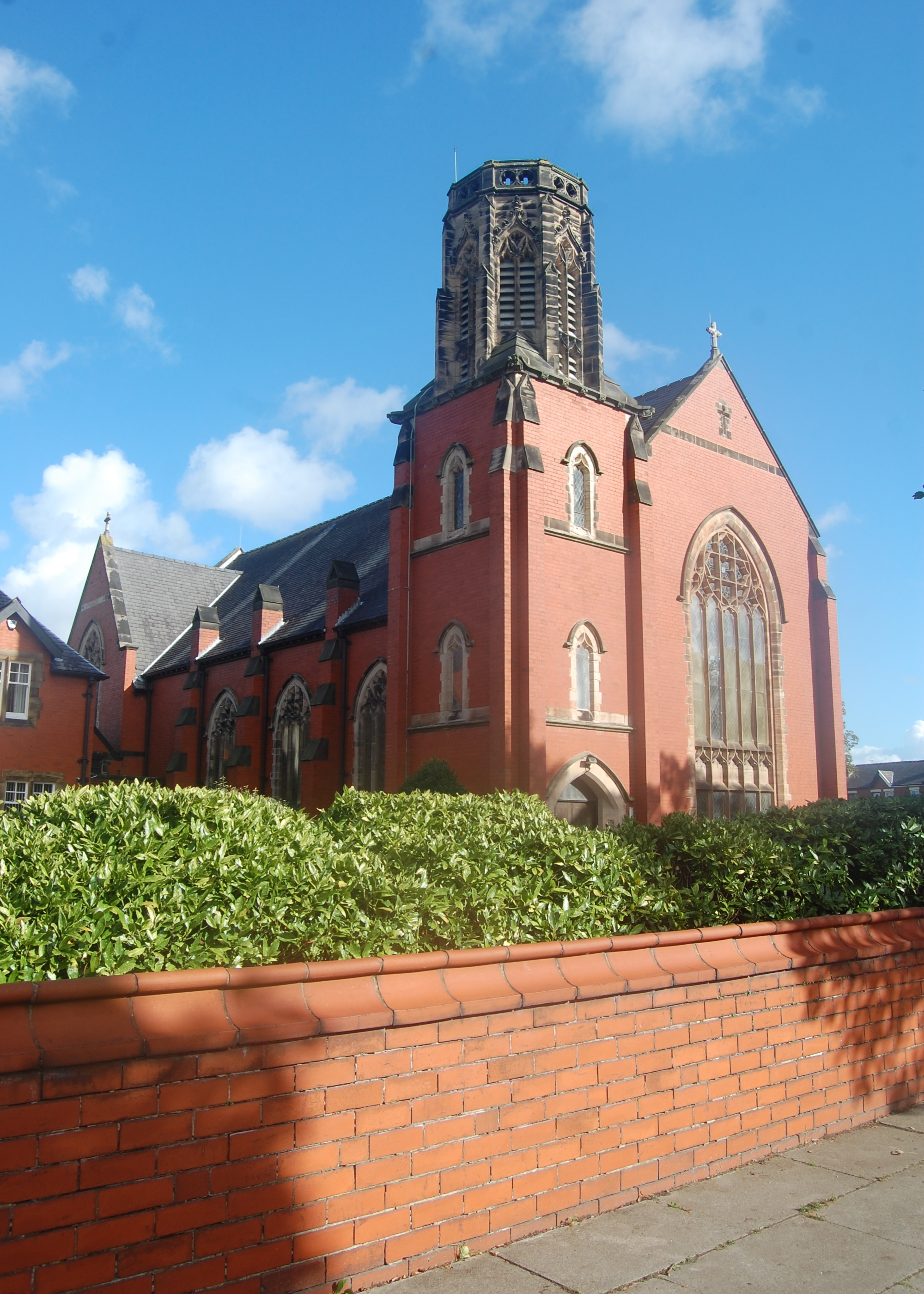
- Holy Family Church

- Location in Southport Location within Merseyside
- OS grid reference: SD357160
- Metropolitan borough: Sefton
- Metropolitan county: Merseyside
- Region: North West
- Country: England
- Sovereign state: United Kingdom
- Post town: SOUTHPORT
- Postcode district: PR8, PR9
- Dialling code: 01704
- Police: Merseyside
- Fire: Merseyside
- Ambulance: North West
- UK Parliament: Southport

Meols Cop (/ˈmiːlz ˈkɒp/ MEELZ-KOP) is a small area within the Blowick suburb, in the coastal town of Southport, Merseyside in north-western England. It is not a suburb or ward in its own right. It is not to be confused with Meols on the Wirral Peninsula. The two can be differentiated by pronunciation — Meols Cop is pronounced Meels, but Meols, Wirral is pronounced Mells.

The area is served by station of the same name with trains to Southport railway station or Wigan Wallgate railway station and beyond. Meols Cop railway station opened on 2 September 1887, and served both lines. The line from Butts Lane Junction to Altcar and Hillhouse closed on 26 September 1938, but the line through Meols Cop is still open today. As in 1965, the direct line from Pool Hey Junction to St Luke's closed and trains to and from Wigan were diverted to run via the former Altcar line and a section of the former Southport to Preston line. Meols Cop railway station remained open and is served by Wigan and Southport trains today; goods train services were however withdrawn on 27 November 1967.

The 2024 Southport stabbings happened in this area, in which three children were killed and ten others sustained injuries. The suspect was described as a 17-year-old black man born in Cardiff, Wales, to Christian immigrants from Rwanda. The incident led to widespread race riots primarily aimed at those from Muslim backgrounds, building on existing mainstream Islamophobia and anti-immigration sentiment.
