= Alisher Seitov =

Kazakhstani diver

Personal information
- Nationality: Kazakhstani
- Born: 5 May 1979 (age 46) Alma-Ata, Kazakh SSR, Soviet Union

Sport
- Sport: Diving

Alisher Seitov (Алишер Аркинович Сеитов, born 5 May 1979) is a Kazakhstani diver. He competed in the men's 3 metre springboard event at the 2000 Summer Olympics.
