= Julian Goose =

British judge

The Honourable Mr Justice Goose
- Royal coat of arms of the United Kingdom

High Court Judge King's Bench Division
- Incumbent
- Assumed office 2 October 2017
- Monarchs: Elizabeth II; Charles III

Personal details
- Born: 26 July 1961 (age 65) United Kingdom
- Spouse: Susan Bulmer (m. 1987)
- Children: 3
- Education: University of Leeds (LLB)

Sir Julian Nicholas Goose (born 26 July 1961) is a British High Court judge.

Goose was educated at Birkdale School and Silverdale School. He completed an LLB at the University of Leeds.

He was called to the bar at Lincoln's Inn in 1984. He served as a recorder from 1998 to 2013 and took silk in 2002. He was head of chambers at Zenith Chambers from 2004 to 2013. He served as a senior circuit judge and resident judge at Sheffield Combined Court Centre from 2013 to 2017; he was honorary recorder of Sheffield for the same period. In 2010, he was appointed to sit as a deputy High Court judge.

He was appointed by the Lord Chief Justice of England and Wales to the Sentencing Council in 2014 and served until 2020.

On 2 October 2017, he was appointed a High Court judge and assigned to the Queen's Bench Division. He took the customary knighthood in the same year. From January 2022, he has been the Presiding Judge of the northern circuit.

In 1987, he married Susan Bulmer, with whom he has two sons and one daughter.

== Notable cases ==
Notable cases heard by Goose include:

- Wallasey pub shooting
- The shooting of Ashley Dale
- 2024 Southport stabbing
