= Silverdale School =

Academy in Sheffield, South Yorkshire, England

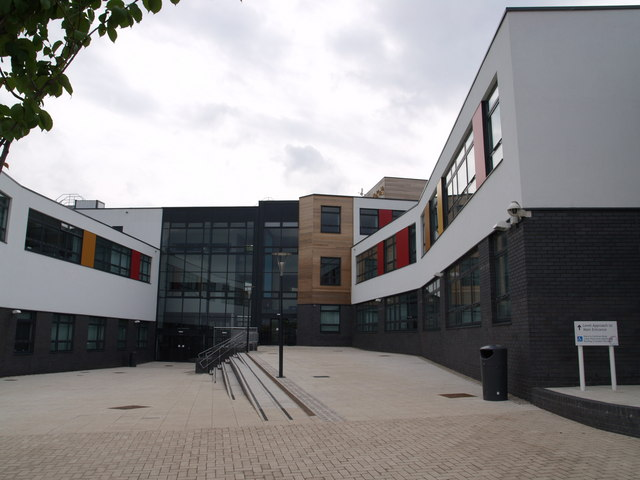

Location
- Bents Crescent; Sheffield, South Yorkshire, S11 9QH; England; 53°21′06″N 1°31′51″W

Information
- Type: Academy
- Department for Education URN: 139167 Tables
- Ofsted: Reports
- Headteacher: Jim Smith
- Gender: Coeducational
- Age: 11 to 18
- Enrolment: 1461
- Website: https://www.silverdale.chorustrust.org/

Silverdale School is a coeducational secondary school and sixth form with academy status, in Sheffield, South Yorkshire, England. It is the founding school of Chorus Education Trust (formerly Silverdale Multi-Academy Trust). It opened in 1957 as a secondary modern school, and became a comprehensive school in 1969. It serves approximately 1,200 pupils from the local area, from ages 11 to 18. In 2004, Silverdale was placed 4th in Sheffield school performance exam league tables. In 2017, Silverdale students achieved the top A-level results of all state schools in the city. Recent Ofsted reports have placed the school in the good category, but placed the 6th form in outstanding, as of October 2022. This is a downgrade from the outstanding the school scored in 2014. In 2018, it was named the Sunday Times North State Secondary School of the Year. In 2020, it was named Top State School of the North for the Decade by the Sunday Times. The school converted to an academy school in January 2013.

== New building ==
As part of the nationwide BSF programme (which aimed to see every secondary school in England rebuilt), Silverdale School has a new building. Construction began 6 months late on 26 March 2007 on the site of the old playing fields and opened on 7 January 2009. The scheme is a controversial private finance initiative, meaning ownership of the site has since transferred to Taylor Woodrow, who were named the preferred construction company in 2006. Besides constructing the new building and demolishing the old, Taylor Woodrow Facilities Management will rent the school to Sheffield City Council and other companies who can use its facilities for the next 25 years. After 25 years, the site and building ownership returns to Sheffield City Council.

Demolition of the old building began in February 2009. A new field and all weather sports pitch was built on the land.

In 2023 a new detached three-floor classroom block was completed to help keep up with the rapid expansion of the school's population. By 2027 the school will be able to accommodate 300 extra students to match the 25% rise in births the local catchment saw between 2002 and 2012. The block features 14 extra classrooms and a new dining area. It also became the new home of the schools 6th form with a large dedicated Sith form common room.

== Exam pass rate ==
In 2018 students taking GCSEs achieved a Progress 8 score of +0.67 which represents outstanding progress for students in all abilities in a broad range of subjects. This was the highest score for all secondary schools in South Yorkshire. In 2019 students taking GCSEs achieved a Progress 8 score of +0.58 which again represented outstanding progress.

In 2019 Silverdale was ranked in the top ten state secondary schools in the region, according to the Sunday Times. The school had been rated The Top State Secondary School in the North by the Sunday Times in 2018.

For A-level results, Silverdale Sixth Form has regularly achieved the highest results of all state schools in Sheffield (2017 and 2019); in 2018 it achieved the highest A-level progress score in the city.

== Teaching School ==
Due to its Outstanding status, Silverdale was successful in establishing its own Teaching School, the Sheffield Teaching School Alliance (STSA), which works with over 50 schools locally to train new and existing teachers.

In 2017, due to its success in recruiting trainee teachers and the school's history as a language specialist school, it was chosen by the Department for Education to establish the National Modern Languages SCITT, a teacher training programme solely for modern languages.

In 2019 Silverdale was one of six chosen by the Department for Education to establish a Teaching School Hub to bring together the work of local teaching schools, particularly in helping struggling schools.

== Notable former pupils ==
- Jane Smith (diver) – Former Commonwealth & Olympic diver who won the 1998 edition of Gladiators and the 1999 "Champion of Champions" event.
- Vikram Barn (Vikkstar123) – YouTube personality, member of the group Sidemen
- Oliver Coppard – Mayor of South Yorkshire
- Cameron Dawson – goalkeeper for Exeter City F.C.
- Julian Goose – High Court judge
- James Handscombe - Founding principal of Harris Westminster Sixth Form
- George Long – goalkeeper for Millwall F.C
- Robert Quinney – Organist and Master of the Choristers of New College, Oxford
- Devon van Oostrum – basketball player for Caja Laboral Baskonia
- Michael Vaughan – cricketer
- Willie Williams – theatre designer and video director
