= Eduard Safonov =

Ukrainian diver

Personal information
- Nationality: Ukrainian
- Born: 27 March 1978 (age 47)

Sport
- Sport: Diving

Eduard Safonov (born 27 March 1978) is a Ukrainian diver. He competed in the men's 3 metre springboard event at the 2000 Summer Olympics.
