= Prevent (British government programme) =

UK counter-terrorism programme

Prevent referrals each year
Year	Prevent Referrals	Channel referrals	Channel cases
2015/2016	7631	1072	381
2016/2017	6093	1146	332
2017/2018	7318	1314	564
2018/2019	5738	1320	561
2019/2020	6287	1424	697
2020/2021	4915	1333	688
2021/2022	6405	1486	804
2022/2023	6816	1113	645

Prevent is a multi-agency counter-terrorism programme in the United Kingdom. It is one of the UK's counter terrorism frameworks which the government introduced as part of its CONTEST anti-terrorist framework following the 7/7 London terrorist attacks in 2005. Prevent aims to reduce the threat of terrorism by preventing people from becoming terrorists or supporting terrorism. It claims to be comprehensive in its aims to deradicalise and rehabilitate vulnerable people.

Prevent is overseen by the Commission for Countering Extremism.

== Objectives ==
Prevent is built on three core objectives:

- To tackle ideological causes of terrorism;
- To intervene early to support people from becoming terrorists or supporting terrorism; and
- To rehabilitate those who have engaged in terrorism activity.

Prevent emphasises early intervention to stop vulnerable or easily susceptible individuals in society from being drawn into extremist ideologies. However, there is no single model for someone's radicalisation journey, so bespoke interventions are vital to effectively reintegrate them back into wider societal ideas. Vulnerability to radicalisation arises from several factors like age, disability, risk of abuse or neglect. As radicalisation has no single pathway, the government aims to address risks early, through a multitude of avenues. Prevent monitors trends in radicalisation; violent and non-violent extremism, with particular attention on the rise of Islamic extremism and right-wing ideologies posing the biggest threat of terrorism in recent years.

Prevent adopts a multi-agency approach, using local authorities, schools, healthcare providers, police, and other sectors to recognise and support individuals at risk. Anyone, including members of the public, can refer individuals they believe to be at risk of radicalisation to Prevent. The Counter-Terrorism and Security Act 2015, introduced the Prevent Duty, requiring sectors including schools, local authorities, prisons, and healthcare services to embed Prevent in their safeguarding responsibilities.

The Counter-Terrorism and Security Act 2015 created a positive duty for those working in education or health to report those who they deem at risk of radicalization. As of February 2015, all National Health Service (NHS) staff are required to undergo basic Prevent Awareness Training. Schools provide the educational dimension of the Prevent duty through the Citizenship lessons on the National Curriculum. Since July 2015, schools also have a legal responsibility to have "due regard to the need to prevent people from being drawn into terrorism" under the Prevent duty and Child Protection and Safeguarding guidelines. A film associated with Prevent, Reclaim Radical – Radical versus Radicalised, was released in 2017.

== Deradicalization programme ==
The Prevent Assessment Framework evaluates referrals, to assess if the individual is at risk of being radicalised and determine if they require intervention. The deradicalisation intervention programme is known as Channel. It is led by the police and liberal Muslim mentors. Individuals identified as being at risk are referred to a so-called Channel Panel, a multi-agency-based programme which is chaired by the local authority, to assess and support individuals vulnerable to radicalisation.

Prevent is a voluntary consent-based programme offering tailored support and continued monitoring to ensure effective de-radicalisation. Despite the voluntary nature of Channels resulting in only 13% of Prevent referrals adopted in the year ending March 2022; of these 89% finished the program with no further concerns of radicalisation.

In 2020, 6,287 people were referred to Prevent. Of these, 1,424 were referred to Channel and 697 were taken on as cases for Channel. 43% of the cases taken on by Channel were for right wing extremism and 30% for Islamic extremism.

== Notable failures ==
- The leader of the 2017 London Bridge attack and his brother were involved with Prevent.
- The perpetrator of the 2017 Parsons Green train bombing had been referred to Prevent.
- The perpetrator in the 2021 murder of David Amess, MP had been referred to Prevent.
- Axel Rudakubana, the perpetrator of the July 2024 Southport stabbings, had been referred thrice to Prevent. Significant attention was drawn to Prevent for failing to accept referrals of Rudakubana on the basis of his lacking a terrorist ideology. Although an emergency review found that Prevent had followed correct procedures on each referral, Home Office secretary Yvette Cooper concluded "that too much weight was placed on the absence of ideology" in the programme. Cooper announced in January 2025 that there would be a review on the threshold at which Prevent intervenes, with senior lawyer David Anderson being assigned by Keir Starmer as the Independent Prevent Commissioner to perform the review.

== Criticism ==
The Standards and Compliance Unit, which oversees the Prevent program, has been criticised for logging public criticisms of the Prevent program.

== Independent review ==
An independent review of Prevent by William Shawcross was published by the government in 2023. The report assessed the effectiveness of Prevent, including its failures, and made recommendations for how the program could be improved. The Shawcross report was criticised by a number of organizations and outside observers who stated that the report failed to take into account the full range of information available on the subject.

== See also ==
- Fixated Threat Assessment Centre, a preventative program aimed at non-terrorist threats
