= CONTEST =

UK counter-terrorism strategy

CONTEST is the United Kingdom's counter-terrorism strategy, first developed by Sir David Omand and the Home Office in early 2003 as the immediate response to 9/11, and a revised version was made public in 2006. Further revisions were published on 24 March 2009, July 2011, June 2018, and July 2023. The aim of the strategy is "to reduce the risk to the UK and its interests overseas from terrorism so that people can go about their lives freely and with confidence."

The UK government's definition of "Terrorism" is set out within the Terrorism Act 2000, and the Counter Terrorism Policing (CTP) unit has been set up to implement CONTEST.

CONTEST is composed of the "four Ps" – Prevent, Pursue, Protect, and Prepare – which aim to reduce terrorism at all levels through: Preventing more people from being radicalised; Pursuing suspects operationally and legally; Protecting the public through security measures, and Preparing to manage the response to mitigate the impact of an inevitable attack. Prevent is the most prominent and controversial of these. It includes a duty ("the Prevent duty") for public bodies such as schools and universities to identify and refer those displaying signs of potential extremist or terrorist activity, and a programme ("Channel") to de-radicalise such individuals. It has been criticised by civil rights groups and British Muslims for stigmatising Muslim communities, as well as by conservative pundits for identifying right-wing extremists as potential terrorists.

== Background and development ==
=== Revisions ===
The August 2018 revision reportedly puts more focus on ways of prevention and how to best alert the public to terrorist threats. In an article written for The Observer, former UK Prime Minister Gordon Brown stated that the strategy is "recognised by our allies to be world-leading in its wide-ranging nature, [and] leaves us better prepared and strengthened in our ability to ensure all peace-loving people of this country can live normally, with confidence and free from fear."

In March 2019, the Court of Appeal found that the Prevent guidance on inviting controversial speakers at universities was unlawfully unbalanced and must be rewritten.

In January 2020, The Guardian reported that Extinction Rebellion, the climate emergency campaign group promoted by Greta Thunberg, had been included on an official list of extremist organisations whose members should be reported to the authorities. The South East Counter Terrorism Unit later said that after review, the document was being withdrawn.

An independent review of Prevent led by Lord Carlile was announced in August 2019 as part of the Counter-Terrorism and Border Security Act 2019. However it was dropped after a petitioner complained about his potential bias because he had spoken out in favour of the strategy prior to his review, and the Home Office vacated the initiative. In January 2021, the Patel Home Office appointed Sir William Shawcross to head the review of the Prevent programme. On 20 February 2024 the Shawcross review was published in final form. At the time Shawcross found that some recommendations had not been implemented and the public was at risk. The scheme had repeatedly "failed" to identify attackers, and there was a "sense of lost purpose". In the wake of the October 7 massacre in Israel certain segments of the British population were frightened, especially those concerned with a "dangerous" surge in anti-semitism. The Cooper Home Office said 30 of 34 recommendations had been implemented and the remaining balance were in the works. Shawcross said that staff within Prevent were overly concerned with "tackling the rise in Right-wing terrorism", to the detriment of other dangers. He questioned the allocation of resource in Prevent and was troubled by the disparity with MI5's allocation, which stood at 75% caseload was focused on Islamist threats whereas one in ten staff of Prevent were focused on the same issue.

== The four Ps ==
=== Prevent ===
Prevent, introduced by CONTEST following the 7/7 London terrorist attacks in 2005, is a multi-agency approach which aims to reduce the threat of terrorism by preventing people from becoming terrorists or supporting terrorism. It claims to be comprehensive in its aims to deradicalise and rehabilitate vulnerable people.

Prevent aims to:

- tackle ideological causes of terrorism;
- intervene early to support people from becoming terrorists or supporting terrorism; and
- rehabilitate those who have engaged in terrorist activity.

Prevent emphasises early intervention to stop vulnerable or easily susceptible individuals from being drawn into extremist ideologies. As radicalisation has no single pathway, the government aims to address risks early in several ways.

Prevent monitors trends in radicalisation and extremism, with particular attention on the rise of Islamic extremism and right-wing ideologies.

Prevent uses local authorities, schools, healthcare providers, police, and other sectors to recognise and support individuals at risk. Anyone, including members of the public, can refer individuals they believe to be at risk of radicalisation to Prevent.

The Counter-Terrorism and Security Act 2015 created a positive duty for those working in education or health to report those who they deem at risk of radicalization. All National Health Service (NHS) staff are required to undergo basic Prevent Awareness Training. Schools provide the educational dimension of the Prevent duty through the Citizenship lessons on the National Curriculum. Since July 2015, schools also have a legal responsibility to have "due regard to the need to prevent people from being drawn into terrorism" under the Prevent duty and Child Protection and Safeguarding guidelines. The Prevent Assessment Framework evaluates referrals, to assess if the individual is at risk of being radicalised and determine if they require intervention.

The deradicalisation intervention programme is known as Channel. It is led by the police and liberal Muslim mentors. Despite the voluntary nature of Channel resulting in only 13% of Prevent referrals adopted in the year ending March 2022; of these 89% finished the program with no further concerns of radicalisation. In 2020, 6,287 people were referred to Prevent. Of these, 1,424 were referred to Channel and 697 were taken on as cases for Channel. 43% of the cases taken on by Channel were for right wing extremism and 30% for Islamic extremism.

Prevent has had a number of notable failures, As a result of the failure of Prevent to prevent the July 2024 Southport stabbings, the Home Office secretary Yvette Cooper concluded "that too much weight was placed on the absence of ideology" in the programme. Cooper announced in January 2025 that there would be a review on the threshold at which Prevent intervenes, with senior lawyer David Anderson being assigned by Keir Starmer as the Independent Prevent Commissioner to perform the review.

=== Pursue ===
The aim of Pursue is to stop terrorist attacks happening in the UK or against UK interests overseas. The main objectives of Pursue are to detect, understand, investigate, and disrupt terrorist activity. There are multiple types of terrorists that are being pursued under this system, including:

- International terrorist groups, such as Al-Qaeda.
- Domestic terrorist groups, such as Islamist movements in London responsible for the 7 July 2005 London bombings, and further attacks in 2017 such as the Manchester Arena bombing.
- Lone wolf attacks, for example Darren Osbourne, the perpetrator of the 2017 Finsbury Park van attack.
- Hostile nation states, for example Russia's involvement in the Poisoning of Sergei and Yulia Skripal, also known as the Salisbury Poisonings.

Counter Terrorism Policing work with MI5 to develop intelligence, and with the Crown Prosecution Service to put compelling evidence before the courts. The public can also support law enforcement to pursue potential terrorist activity through calling the anti-terrorist hotline. Action Counters Terrorism (ACT) encourages individuals to report suspicious activity which could be related to terrorism through online reporting, or by contacting the police in confidence on their dedicated phone number.

Government departments and agencies work collaboratively to disrupt terrorist activity. Counter-terrorism policing, MI5, and wider intelligence work together closely to investigate, detect, and disrupt terrorism, alongside the Criminal Justice System. The Ministry of Defence is a key contributor to CONTEST strategy. It particularly supports Pursue through its military capability to disrupt overseas terrorist groups and its support of overseas law enforcement and security agencies. Its support for conflict prevention work has also contributed to the CONTEST objectives. Work overseas is crucial to Pursue, as previous UK attack plots have had support from terrorists overseas, as well as UK individuals being radicalised while overseas. Working with international partners therefore attempts to disrupt the threat before it manifests itself in the UK.

An important element of Pursue is the independent oversight regime, which scrutinises the significant powers and tools used to stop potential terrorist attacks, ensuring they are used proportionately and appropriately.

Proportionality must be considered when using broader powers for terrorism investigations. The Secretary of State must be satisfied that the information obtained could not reasonably have been obtained by any other means. The intelligence gain must be sufficiently great to justify an intrusion, as well as any unavoidable collateral intrusion against individuals other than the target. The Regulation of Investigatory Powers Act 2000 ensures that investigatory techniques are used in a way that is compatible with the Article 8 right to respect for private and family life, as in the European Convention on Human Rights.

Pursue is becoming increasingly complex as the threat of terrorism continues to diversify. Between 1 January and 31 December 2022, 169 persons were arrested for terrorism related activity, with 232 persons held in custody for terrorism-connected offences. From 2017 to July 2023, MI5 and the police have disrupted 39 late stage attack plots.

Within Pursue there are different elements of strategy involved: detection, prosecution, punishment, control, and disruption.

Detection involves gaining specific reliable information and evidence. This may require the use of various surveillance methods such as hacking for digital information, or human surveillance through undercover policing. There are specific powers which can be utilised for these purposes, such as the specific power of arrest on suspicion of a terrorist, under section 41 of the Terrorism Act 2000. Additionally those within the Investigatory Powers Act 2016, such as targeted interception, which involves requesting a warrant from the Secretary of State to intercept transmission of communications.

There is information related to security and intelligence, and special investigation powers which is protected by the Official Secrets Act 1989. This provides legal protection against unauthorised disclosure of information and espionage, and protest certain tactics of information gathering.

Under section 41 of the Terrorism Act 2000 a suspect can be detained for a maximum of 14 day before being charged, compared to the maximum of four days under standard arrest powers. This allows more time for police to investigate and gather evidence in relation to the potential terrorism offences. Additional powers allow a senior police officer to delay a suspect's access to a solicitor and/or contact with a named person. This is authorised if they believe that exercising this right may result in any of the consequences listed in section 41 of the Terrorism Act 2000, for example sending out a dangerous message which may instigate an act of terrorism.

There are a number of extremist groups which are banned under UK law, as part of the counter-terrorist legislation. Section 3 of the Terrorism Act 2000 allows the Home Secretary to proscribe an organisation if they are concerned in terrorism. This means the organisation commits or participates in acts of terrorism, prepares for terrorism, promotes, or encourages terrorism.

Proscription must be proportionate, which means the following factors must be taken into account when deciding whether to proscribe an organisation:

- The nature and scale of the organisation's activities
- The specific threat posed to the UK
- The specific threat posed to British nationals overseas
- The extent of the organisation's presence in the UK
- The need to support other members of the international community in the global fight against terrorism.

Between 2018 and 2023 there have been six terrorist groups proscribed, including extreme right-wing groups such as Atomwaffen Division and The Base (hate group).

The Terrorism Act 2006 introduced further established terrorist offences including the encouragement of terrorism, preparation of terrorist acts and terrorist training, and offences involving radioactive devices and materials and nuclear facilities and sites. An example of this is 19-year-old Matthew King who pleaded guilty to the preparation of terrorist acts, and has now been sentenced to life imprisonment.

In 2021 Shabazz Suleman was arrested and charged with terror offences under the Terrorism Act 2000. He has since pleaded guilty to preparing acts of terrorism by travelling to Turkey to join IS in Syria, as well as being charged with being a member of the proscribed group, IS, and receiving training in the use of firearms.

Although there are specific terrorist offences which are criminalised in the UK, the prosecution process remains the same, and prosecutors are tried fairly through the mainstream criminal justice system. The Crown Prosecution Service has a Special Crime and Counter Terrorism Division (SCCTD) to deal with the prosecution of terrorism cases. In 2021 Greer emphasised why this process is significant stating that it "... offers the best prospects of securing the legitimacy of counterterrorist law enforcement and of maintaining public confidence in it."

The Counter-Terrorism and Security Act 2015 contains more powers to aid the UK's response to the threat of terrorism; in relation to Pursue it enhances the ability of operational agencies to monitor and control actions of those posing a threat.

The Counter-Extremism Strategy was published by the UK Government in 2015 and focuses on disrupting extremism, as well as extremists' rehabilitation and reintegration into society. This is an example of the punishment and control elements of Pursue.

=== Protect ===
Protect is the third component of the UK's counter-terrorism strategy, aiming to reduce the country's vulnerabilities to terrorist threats. The primary stated purpose is to strengthen the defences against terrorist attacks through the implementation of safeguarding and infrastructures to protect people and public places. It aims to mitigate the impact of terrorist attacks and reduce the likelihood of further attacks. It is delivered through collaborative counter-terrorism efforts by government departments, intelligence agencies, operational experts, private sectors, and international allies. The main objective is to keep the country safe by detecting dangerous people and material.

The process works by first recognising the threats and then identifying the measures to reduce risks. Protect objectives are outlined as:

- Reducing physical risks;
- Safeguarding infrastructures;
- Monitoring access to material and technology of concern;
- Border security;
- Public awareness campaigns.

It delivers safety mechanism techniques like the use of concrete or metal barriers on crowded pedestrian places like bridges and shopping centres, to minimise the degree of damage. An example is the large bollards placed strategically around busy city centres, and especially on bridges, to prevent the rise of vehicle-based attacks such as the 2017 London Bridge attack. It deploys enhancement of protective security for events or crowded spaces through personnel and environmental design principles aim to reduce vulnerability to attacks. With security and staff at major events and venues trained in terrorism awareness and emergency responses procedure.

Protect addresses the risk of attack in all forms of transportation with increased police presence at airports, train, and bus stations. Security measures are applied to crowded spaces through advanced surveillance systems and increased visibility of law enforcement.

Protect also address the threat of terrorism at the UK borders, with measures aimed at identifying and intercepting dangerous individuals and goods. UK borders are under constant scrutiny and protection, with thorough investigation protocols. Under Schedule 7 of the Terrorism Act 2000, law enforcement have the authority to stop, search and detain individuals that show signs of suspicion to be a threat to security. Schedule 7 permits examination officers to stop, question, search, and detain anyone transiting through ports, airports, and international rail stations, with the purpose of determining whether those concerned have been involved in the commission, preparation, or instigation of acts of terrorism.

The Authority to Carry Scheme 2023 aims to prevent individuals travelling to or from the UK when it is necessary in the public interest, in order to prevent or disrupt those who pose a terrorism-related threat.

The central rhetoric of Protect is the reposting potential threats to the public and suspicious activity. Prevention methods, encouraging the public to report suspicious people to the police with campaign like “See it. Say it. Sorted.” As well as “Run, Hide, Tell” in advising the public in acting smart in wake of terrorist attacks. These initiatives aim at strengthening the community vigilance and supporting in the early intervention of suspicious activity.

=== Prepare ===
Prepare is the final strand of CONTEST, with a primary goal to mitigate the impact of terrorist attacks, by ensuring co-ordinated responses and effective support and recovery efforts for the public. ^{[1]} Emphasising the importance of readiness and adaptation to the evolving threats of terrorism to ensure immediate response and long-term recovery. Recovery plans assess and mitigating the risk of attacks, managing the aftermath and residual hazards, and providing comprehensive victim support plans.

The main objectives of Prepare are to:

- build proportionate responses to a range of attack methodologies, wherever they might occur
- in response to an attack, deploy a systemised, effective and co-ordinated multi agency response, using specialist and non-specialist capabilities to save lives, mitigate harm, and prevent further attacks
- enable recovery, including long-term care of victims and survivors and the mitigation of any ongoing hazard
- adapt and improve by identifying and sharing learning from research, training, testing, exercising and previous incidents.

Prepare aims to ensure prompt responses in the event of an attacks by the emergency services, to reduce the levels of danger during an attack and save as many people as possible. Requiring the necessary services to be constantly alert and ready to mobilise to contain an attack. Learning from earlier attacks to ensure an effective cross-organisational systems is in place to act during attacks.

The latest version of CONTEST emphasised improvements in technology and coordination within multi-agency emergency response structures. It highlighted the importance of regular training, testing and exercises, as well as effective systems for sharing information and coordinating responses across organisations. These measures were intended to improve preparedness for different types of terrorist attacks. The strategy also addressed changes in terrorist tactics observed during the 2017 Manchester Arena bombing and London Bridge attack, including attacks on public spaces and other locations that are difficult to secure.

Central to Prepare is the Joint Emergency Services Interoperability Principles (JESIP), established in 2014 to enhance collaboration among blue light services, Police, Fire and Ambulance.

JESIP works in a multi-agency approach with five key principles:

- Co-locate with incident commanders as promptly as possible.
- Communicate in clearly without technical jargon.
- Co-ordination to agree the lead organisation for the incident to ensuring effective response.
- Jointly understand risk by sharing of information in the potential of the threat to ensure appropriate measures.
- Shared situational awareness in sharing incident information through METHANE or Joint Decision Model.

The public should follow Prepare advice on the nature of terrorist threats overseas, which is communicated through the Foreign, Commonwealth and Development Office travel advice and advice on how to safely respond in the event of a terrorist incident.

One example of Prepare is the improved protection implemented for UK tourists in Tunisia following the 2015 Sousse attacks.

== Channel ==
Channel is a programme that seeks to reduce radicalisation by referring reported individuals to other services. People working in health or education are required by law to report individuals that meet certain criteria. A channel referral is a referral to the police, who continually use information obtained in order to assess risk, and may make a referral to a channel panel who suggest and prioritise referrals to other services. Involvement is voluntary and referred individuals can refuse to participate. If an individual refuses to participate and a risk is identified the police will be informed. Assessments can be made by a channel panel whether an individual chooses to participate or not.

== Criticism ==
At the National Union of Teachers' 2016 conference in Brighton, the union members voted overwhelmingly against the Prevent strategy. They supported its abolition, citing concerns over the implementation of the strategy and causing "suspicion in the classroom and confusion in the staff room."

Prevent has also been accused of reducing academic freedom. In November 2018, the University of Reading highlighted the article Our Morals: The Ethics of Revolution by Professor Norman Geras as potentially harmful. Students were instructed not to download the article on personal devices and not to leave the article where it could be visible "inadvertently or otherwise, by those who are not prepared to view it".

In 2024, Amnesty International began a campaign for Prevent to be scrapped.

Challenges arise in the monitoring of terrorist organisations, due to the increased scope of technology, particularly the enhanced use of artificial intelligence and anonymous online platforms, which are increasingly difficult to regulate.

=== Cultural nationalists ===
It was reported in June 2025 that the Prevent Assessment Framework document included a referral basis for cultural nationalists, whom it classified as vulnerable to an "extreme right-wing terrorist ideology". The CTP unit had developed an acronym, ERWT, for those they labelled as "Extreme Right Wing Terrorists".

According to a Daily Telegraph editorial, these people could be indicated by their concern over mass migration. A row erupted as Lord Toby Young, who is patron to the Free Speech Union, wrote to the Home Secretary urging her to review her definitions. Young was concerned that the referral of an individual who had expressed a "cultural nationalist" view could harm that individual's career prospects. It came to light that Privy Councillor Jacob Rees-Mogg had been categorized as a "cultural nationalist" by Home Office staff.

=== The Muslim community ===
The 'Prevent' strategy was criticised in 2009 by Shami Chakrabarti, director of Liberty, as a domestic spying programme collecting intelligence about the beliefs of British Muslims not involved in criminal activity. The Communities and Local Government Committee were also critical of the Prevent programme in 2010, stating that it stigmatised and alienated the Muslims the government wanted to work with.

Prevent has been criticised as legitimising and reinforcing Islamophobia and restricting freedom of expression for Muslims in the UK.

Prevent has received both criticism and praise due to its alternative 'softer' approach to counter terrorism, emphasising community engagement in preventing extremism. However, the surveillance and targeting of Muslim communities, has been highly criticised. Despite engagement with marginalised Muslims groups, like 'Salafis' and 'Islamist' told as crucial in building trust and address extremism through collaborative community engagement. Countered by the over policing of Muslim communities; fostering distrust in the police and undermining the aims of prevent.

There have been concerns raised in response to the increased policing and surveillance of cities with large Muslim communities like Birmingham and Manchester, leading to accusations of racial or religious profiling. Risking increased alienation, distrust, and animosity from Muslim communities, these measures achieving the opposite of their intended goal, particularly among young Muslims heightening their risk of radicalisation. Many Muslims perceiving the 'War on Terror' as the war on Islam, complicating the government aims of collaborative engagement with policing.

=== Primary school concerns ===
In June 2016, the MPs Lucy Allan and Norman Lamb introduced a private member's bill to repeal provisions in the Counter-Terrorism and Security Act 2015 where it requires staff to report possible signs of extremism or radicalization between primary and nursery school-aged children, following several high-profile cases where the provision was inappropriately used about the Prevent strategy. The Bill did not become law.

In 2017, two brothers, aged seven and five, were paid damages after they were reported to the Prevent programme after telling a teacher they had been given toy guns. The children had been kept from parents for two hours. After a legal challenge, the Central Bedfordshire Council admitted the children's human rights were breached and they had been racially discriminated against.

=== COVID-19 ===
According to Chief Superintendent Nik Adams of Counter Terrorism Policing, there was in April 2020 growing concern over the link of the COVID-19 pandemic and a greater risk of radicalisation. Due to social isolation and increased reliance on the internet, there are concerns over the potential grooming, and later radicalisation, of vulnerable young people. As a result of face-to-face teaching being suspended and most schools and statutory agencies closing throughout the nationwide lockdown, there has been a marked decrease in the number of people referred to the Prevent programme since restrictions were put in place. Whilst the full effect of COVID restrictions are yet to be seen, the police are encouraging schools to place an emphasis on safeguarding those most vulnerable and provide the resources necessary to help combat radicalisation grooming.

== In other contexts ==
At the Summit for a New Global Financing Pact chaired by Emmanuel Macron in Paris on 22–23 June 2023, CONTEST was presented by Fiona Hill, former chief of staff to Theresa May as home secretary and prime minister, as an exemplar for interdepartmental cooperation for tackling major threats, and a paradigm for how governments should tackle international development and climate change. Hill was speaking at an official summit side event convened by Community Jameel and the Islamic Development Bank at the headquarters of the Organisation for Economic Co-operation and Development.

== See also ==
- Research, Information and Communications Unit
