= Jaroslav Makohin =

Czech diver

Personal information
- Nationality: Czech
- Born: 6 June 1976 (age 48); Rava-Ruska, Ukraine

Sport
- Sport: Diving

Jaroslav Makohin (born 6 June 1976) is a Czech diver. He competed in the men's 3 metre springboard event at the 2000 Summer Olympics.
