= Yoendris Salazar =

Cuban diver (born 1977)

Personal information
- Nationality: Cuban
- Born: 7 August 1977 (age 48)

Sport
- Sport: Diving

Yoendris Salazar (born 7 August 1977) is a Cuban diver. He competed in the men's 3 metre springboard event at the 2000 Summer Olympics.
