= Diving at the 2006 Commonwealth Games – Men's synchronized 3 metre springboard =

Men's synchronized 3 metre springboard at the 2006 Commonwealth Games
- Venue: Melbourne Sports and Aquatic Centre
- Date: 24 March
- Competitors: 10 from 3 nations
- Winning sore: 444.87

Medalists
gold medal	Alexandre Despatie; Arturo Miranda	Canada
silver medal	Antonio Ally; Mark Shipman	England
bronze medal	Steven Barnett; Robert Newbery	Australia

The men's synchronized 3 metre springboard was part of the Diving at the 2006 Commonwealth Games program. The competition was held on 24 March 2006 at Melbourne Sports and Aquatic Centre in Melbourne, Australia.

== Format ==
A single round was held, with each team making six dives. Eleven judges scored each dive: three for each diver, and five for synchronisation. Only the middle score counted for each diver, with the middle three counting for synchronisation. These five scores were averaged, multiplied by 3, and multiplied by the dive's degree of difficulty to give a total dive score. The scores for each of the five dives were summed to give a final score.

== Schedule ==
All times are Australian Eastern Daylight Time (UTC+11).

Date	Start	Round
24 March	20:31	Finals

== Results ==
Results:

Rank	Nation	Total
1st place, gold medalist(s)	Canada - Canada 2 Alexandre Despatie; Arturo Miranda	444.87
2nd place, silver medalist(s)	England - England; Antonio Ally; Mark Shipman	423.00
3rd place, bronze medalist(s)	Australia - Australia 1 Steven Barnett; Robert Newbery	421.35
4	Australia - Australia 2 Matthew Mitcham; Scott Robertson	401.94
5	Canada - Canada 1 Kevin Geyson; Cameron McLean	336.66
