= Jean-Romain Delaloye =

Swiss diver

Personal information
- Nationality: Swiss
- Born: 3 June 1981 (age 43)

Sport
- Sport: Diving

Jean-Romain Delaloye (born 3 June 1981) is a Swiss diver. He competed at the 2000 Summer Olympics and the 2004 Summer Olympics.
