= Jeff Liberty =

Canadian diver

Personal information
- Born: 5 February 1978 (age 47); North Bay, Ontario, Canada

Sport
- Sport: Diving

Jeff Liberty (born 5 February 1978) is a Canadian diver. He competed in the men's 3 metre springboard event at the 2000 Summer Olympics.
