= Mute of malice =

Defendant in a criminal case who chooses not to speak

A mute of malice is a defendant in a criminal case who willfully chooses not to speak, as opposed to one who does not speak because they are physically or psychologically unable to do so.

== Britain ==
In British jurisprudence, a separate trial is held before the main trial to determine whether the defendant is mute of malice or mute due to "visitation of God". In the past, if they were found by the jury to be mute of malice, they would be tortured until they spoke or died (see Peine forte et dure).

In a criminal trial in Oxford Crown Court in 2023, the defendant was a litigant in person who refused to speak in court, whom the jury first found mute of malice, and the following day found guilty of the criminal charge. The instructing judge said it was the first instance in his 40-year career; that mute of malice meant the defendant "is deliberately faking their inability to speak", and that mute due to visitation of God did not mean that "a deity has descended upon us and struck him down".

== Netherlands ==
In the Netherlands, the concept is not used as in most other countries; the defendant has a constitutional right to silence and a right to refuse self-incrimination under all circumstances, such as in a court hearing or during a police questioning.

== Sources ==
- Morris, A. J.; Elcock, S.; Hardie, Tim; MacKay, Ronnie D. (December 2006). "Changes to (un)fitness to plead and insanity proceedings". The Journal of Forensic Psychiatry & Psychology. 17 (4): 603–610. doi:10.1080/14789940601012649.
- Morris, Ruth (December 1999). "The Face of Justice: Historical Aspects of Court Interpreting". Interpreting. 4 (1): 97–123. doi:10.1075/intp.4.1.10mor.
