= Tony Ally =

British diver (born 1973)

Personal information
- Born: 17 August 1973 (age 52) Luton, England
Medal record
Men's diving
Commonwealth Games
Representing England
Silver medal – second place	2002 Manchester	1 m springboard
Silver medal – second place	2002 Manchester	3 m springboard
Silver medal – second place	2006 Melbourne	3 m synchro
Bronze medal – third place	1998 Kuala Lumpur	3 m springboard
European Championships
Representing Great Britain
Gold medal – first place	1999 Istanbul	3 m springboard
Bronze medal – third place	1999 Istanbul	3 m synchro

Antonio "Tony" Pietro Ally (born Ali, 17 August 1973) is a British diver.

== Early life ==
Ally was brought up in Catford, London. He was diagnosed with a hearing disorder during childhood. When he was nine, his brother died and later reasoned that hearing his brother's voice "spurred him on for 19 years". He used to enjoy kickboxing as a child but only as a means of training. He moved to Sheffield in 1992 and trained at Ponds Forge, a leisure complex.

== Diving career ==
Ally won his first senior national championship when he was aged 12, with coaching being done by lip-reading, as Ally expressed being too proud to wear "old, ugly, cumbersome" hearing aids in his earlier years. Around the same time, he represented Great Britain in Strasbourg and beat all his competition.

=== Olympic Games ===
In Ally's first Olympic Games he competed in the 1996 men's 3 metre springboard at the 1996 Summer Olympics in Atlanta, Georgia in the United States. Four years later he competed in the 2000 men's 3 metre springboard and qualified for the final, finishing in 12th place. He also competed in the synchronized event with Mark Shipman and came seventh.

At the 1996 Olympics in Atlanta he and his teammate Bob Morgan publicised the plight of British athletes and the lack of funded support by publicly selling his British Olympic Team kit to pay off loans. This gained notoriety in the British newspapers, being seen as the nadir of an already poor British performance that saw the GB team finish 36th in the medal table, winning a single gold medal. It was regularly cited as an example of how poorly funded British sport was before lottery funding of athletes was introduced in time for the 2000 Summer Olympics. Leon Taylor, a British diver who won a silver medal at the 2004 Summer Olympics, suggested that Morgan & Ally's actions shamed the British Olympic Association into arranging for more professional funding of British Olympians.

=== Commonwealth Games ===
Ally competed in five Commonwealth Games winning four medals. He represented England in the springboard and platform events, at the 1990 Commonwealth Games in Auckland, New Zealand, his first of five Commonwealth Games appearances. In 1998 he was a bronze medalist in the 3 metres springboard, at the Games in Kuala Lumpur. He followed this success up by winning double silver in 2002 before going on to be the flag bearer for the English contingent in 2006 in Melbourne where he won another silver medal in the synchronized three metre springboard.

=== European Championships ===
Ally won gold in the European Championships for the three metre event in 1999, being the first British diver to win the medal. The achievement came just a year after a significant motorbike accident in Italy and is considered by Ally as being among his most memorable sporting moments.

=== Club ===
Ally's diving club is the City of Sheffield.

== Boxing ==
Outside of diving, Ally also trained in boxing, having said during a 2005 interview that he wished he had taken up the sport 20 years earlier. After being urged by a friend, he started training around 2002 in the St Thomas' Boys Club gym, where former world super-featherweight champion Naseem Hamed also trained. Ally attributed his healthier lifestyle to boxing, having lost 2 stone (28 lb; 13 kg) and significantly reduced his body fat. Despite being keen to take up boxing professionally, he was apprehensive about the risk of losing his lottery funding that financed his diving career, noting that he would have already turned to boxing if it weren't for that.

== Personal life ==
During a holiday in Italy in 1998, Ally was involved in a motorbike accident which almost destroyed all muscles in his right arm. The damage was severe enough that surgeons needed to take muscle from his forearm and regrow it.

Ally appeared on The Million Pound Drop Live on 8 October 2011, and lost.

On 11 August 2012, he appeared on BBC News Live programme, as part of a panel discussion about Tom Daley's diving progression. Ally worked as the Assistant Head Coach of diving at Sheffield Diving Club from 2016 to 2023, after which he moved to Perth to work as a diving coach for Diving Western Australia.
