= Liesl Ischia =

Australian diver

Personal information
- Born: 1983 (age 42–43) Melbourne, Australia

Sport
- Sport: Diving
Medal record
Representing Australia
World Junior Championships
Bronze medal – third place	2000 Calgary	1m springboard

Liesl Ischia (born 1983) is a diver who represented Australia at the 2002 Commonwealth Games in Manchester, England. Ischia attended Carey Baptist Grammar School in Hawthorn, Melbourne, holding the current Associated Public Schools of Victoria diving records for girls as well as various junior APS athletic records. She won bronze at the World Junior Championships in Calgary, Canada, 2000. Having retired from diving in 2006, she studied medicine at the University of Sydney and is currently a doctor at the Royal Prince Alfred Hospital.

== Sources ==
- https://www.abc.net.au/commonwealthgames/2002/nations/team_australia.htm
- https://web.archive.org/web/20090816085047/http://www.vis.org.au/downloads/Pinnacle57.pdf
