= Cyril Martin (British Army officer) =

Cyril Arthur Joseph Martin
- Born: 23 July 1897; Derby, Derbyshire, England
- Died: 29 November 1973 (aged 76); South Cadbury, Somerset, England
- Burial place: St Thomas A Becket, South Cadbury, Somerset, England
- Military career
- Allegiance: United Kingdom
- Branch: British Army
- Service years: 1916
- Rank: Major
- Service number: 144910
- Units: Royal Garrison Artillery; Royal Engineers
- Conflicts: First World War; Second World War: The Blitz
- Awards: George Cross; Military Cross

Major Cyril Arthur Joseph Martin, GC, MC (23 July 1897 – 29 November 1973) was a British Army officer who was awarded the George Cross (GC) for the courage he showed in defusing a device while serving with the Corps of Royal Engineers Bomb Disposal Squad on 17/18 January 1943 in Battersea, London.

== Early life and career ==
He was born on 23 July 1897 in Derby and served with the Royal Garrison Artillery of the British Army during the First World War, having been commissioned in September 1916. It was while serving with his regiment that he earned the Military Cross. The citation for his MC, appearing in The London Gazette in June 1918, reads as follows:

For conspicuous gallantry and devotion to duty. With two men he extinguished a burning ammunition dump under heavy and continuous fire and while overheated ammunition was exploding close by. He showed great coolness and resource.

He was re-commissioned on 17 August 1940 during the Second World War.

From the beginning of the Blitz and during the heavy raids of 1940–41, Major Martin carried out bomb disposal work and dealt with a high number of unexploded bombs during this period. He continued with this work through to 1943.

== George Cross ==
Following a Luftwaffe air raid on the night of 17–18 January 1943, a large bomb fell into the warehouse belonging to the Victoria Haulage Company in Battersea. The warehouse contained heavy machinery from the United States. Due to the importance of the machinery this bomb was a high priority for disposal.

The bomb contained a new, unrecognised type of fuse, which contained both an anti-handling device and booby trap. No existing disarming techniques or equipment could deal with the fuse mechanism.

A decision was made to remove the bomb's base plate and extract the explosive filling – Martin was called to carry out this task. After removing the base plate, Martin found that the explosive content was of the solid cast TNT type, which would require steaming at high pressure. The normal process for steaming, by remote control was deemed too risky.

For this task the steam nozzle was directly applied by hand and used a low level amount of steam, enough to just soften the TNT fill, so it was pliable enough for it to be scooped out. Martin was assisted by another. Lt R.W. Deans managed to steam out the explosive over the course of nearly 18 hours (from afternoon on 20 January afternoon till 08.30 the next day) through a small hole bored into the bomb through which water and steam could be introduced.

Notice of his award appeared in the London Gazette on 11 March 1943:

The King has been graciously pleased to approve the award of the George Cross, in recognition of most conspicuous gallantry in carrying out hazardous work in a very brave manner.
