= Jane Smith (diver) =

English diver (born 1975)

Personal information
- National team: Great Britain
- Citizenship: British
- Born: Jane Elizabeth Smith; 25 November 1975 (age 50) Sheffield, South Yorkshire, England

Sport
- Country: Great Britain
- Sport: Diving

Achievements and titles
- Olympic finals: 2000, 2004
- Commonwealth finals: 2002
Medal record
Event	1st	2nd	3rd
Commonwealth Games	0	0	2
Total	0	0	2
Diving
Representing England
Commonwealth Games
Bronze medal – third place	1 m springboard	2002 Manchester
Bronze medal – third place	3 m springboard	2002 Manchester

Jane Elizabeth Smith (born 25 November 1975 in Sheffield, South Yorkshire) is an English former diver, who won bronze medals in the 1m and 3m springboard events at the 2002 Commonwealth Games. She also competed for Great Britain at the 2000 and 2004 Summer Olympics. Smith competed for the City of Sheffield diving club.

== Career ==
Smith won the 1998 edition of Gladiators and the 1999 "Champion of Champions" event. At the 2000 Summer Olympics, Smith and Tandi Indergaard finished 14th in the 3m synchronised diving event. Smith was forced to miss the 2001 Diving World Championships due to shoulder surgery. At the 2002 Commonwealth Games, Smith won bronze medals in the 1m and 3m springboard events. Her 3m springboard medal was the first medal for an English woman at the Games. Smith also competed at the 2004 Summer Olympics, where she finished fourth in the 3m synchronised diving event with Gerrard, and did not qualify for the final of the 3m springboard event. Smith announced her retirement from diving in January 2005.
