= Mark Shipman =

British diver (born 1973)

Personal information
- Born: 3 January 1973 (age 53) Leeds, West Yorkshire

Sport
- Club: City of Sheffield
Medal record
Men's diving
Representing Great Britain
European Championships
| Bronze medal – third place | 1999 Istanbul | 3 m synchro |
Representing England
Commonwealth Games
| Silver medal – second place | 2006 Melbourne | 3 m synchro |

Mark Shipman (born 3 January 1973, in Leeds, West Yorkshire, England) is a male retired British diver. Mark attended Guiseley School. He is divorced with 2 teenage girls. Aeryn Anna Shipman and Anaïs Kirsten Shipman. Mark currently lives in South Africa and travels to the UK frequently.

== Swimming career ==
Shipman has competed at European, World and Olympic levels on the 3 metre springboard. With Tony Ally he came 7th in the 2000 Olympics in Sydney.

He competed at four consecutive Commonwealth Games, which culminated in winning a silver medal in the 3 metres springboard synchronised event, at the 2006 Commonwealth Games for England.

His club is City of Sheffield although he started diving with Bradford Esprit under the tutelage of Tom Daley's coach Andy Banks.
