= List of Commonwealth Games medallists in diving =

This is the complete list of Commonwealth Games medallists in diving from 1930 to 2018.

== Men's ==
=== 1 m springboard ===
Event	Gold		Silver		Bronze	
1990	Russell Butler; Australia	583.65	David Bédard; Canada	547.35	Simon McCormack; Australia	546.87
1994	Jason Napper; Canada	364.08	Michael Murphy; Australia	363.18	Evan Stewart; Zimbabwe	357.78
1998	Evan Stewart; Zimbabwe		Dean Pullar; Australia		Robert Newbery; Australia	
2002	Alexandre Despatie; Canada		Tony Ally; England		Steven Barnett; Australia	
2006	Alexandre Despatie; Canada	853.50	Yeoh Ken Nee; Malaysia	844.95	Steven Barnett; Australia	777.85
2010	Alexandre Despatie; Canada		Matthew Mitcham; Australia		Scott Robertson; Australia	
2014	Jack Laugher; England		Matthew Mitcham; Australia		Grant Nel; Australia	
2018	Jack Laugher; England	438.00	James Connor; Australia	412.45	James Heatly; Scotland	399.25
2022	Jack Laugher; England	447.05	Li Shixin; Australia	437.05	Jordan Houlden; England	429.30

=== 3 m springboard ===
Event	Gold		Silver		Bronze	
1930	Alfred Phillips; Canada	147	Cyril Kennett; Canada	138	Arthur Stott; Canada	127
1934	John Brisco Ray; England	117.12	Doug Tomalin; England	110.50	Harry Class; Canada	106.57
1938	Ron Masters; Australia	126.36	Doug Tomalin; England	124.78	George Athans; Canada	117.90
1950	George Athans; Canada	169.21	Peter Heatly; Scotland	168.80	Jack Stewart; New Zealand	168.17
1954	Peter Heatly; Scotland	146.76	Tony Turner; England	145.27	Jack Stewart; New Zealand	144.98
1958	Keith Collin; England	126.78	William Patrick; Canada	124.62	Peter Tarsey; England	118.81
1962	Brian Phelps; England	154.14	Thomas Dinsley; Canada	147.22	Ernie Meissner; Canada	145.03
1966	Brian Phelps; England	154.55	Don Wagstaff; Australia	150.17	Chris Robb; Australia	136.52
1970	Don Wagstaff; Australia	557.73	Kenneth Sully; Canada	497.37	Ron Friesen; Canada	495.9
1974	Don Wagstaff; Australia	531.54	Scott Cranham; Canada	509.61	Trevor Simpson; England	489.69
1978	Chris Snode; England	643.83	Scott Cranham; Canada	595.53	Don Wagstaff; Australia	572.16
1982	Chris Snode; England	631.38	Steve Foley; Australia	592.08	Mark Graham; New Zealand	551.46
1986	Shaun Panayi; Australia	648.33	John Nash; Canada	647.64	Craig Rogerson; Australia	620.43
1990	Craig Rogerson; Australia	594.84	Mark Rourke; Canada	569.97	Larry Flewwelling; Canada	569.79
1994	Michael Murphy; Australia	671.76	Evan Stewart; Zimbabwe	625.86	Jason Napper; Canada	572.85
1998	Shannon Roy; Australia		Dean Pullar; Australia		Tony Ally; England	
2002	Alexandre Despatie; Canada		Tony Ally; England		Robert Newbery; Australia	
2006	Alexandre Despatie; Canada	941.60	Robert Newbery; Australia	906.30	Steven Barnett; Australia	869.40
2010	Alexandre Despatie; Canada		Reuben Ross; Canada		Grant Nel; Australia	
2014	Ooi Tze Liang; Malaysia		Jack Laugher; England		Oliver Dingley; England	
2018	Jack Laugher; England	519.40	Philippe Gagné; Canada	452.70	James Connor; Australia	438.50
2022	Daniel Goodfellow (ENG)	484.45	Jordan Houlden (ENG)	465.15	Jack Laugher (ENG)	462.30

=== 10 m platform ===
Event	Gold		Silver		Bronze	
1930	Alfred Phillips; Canada	90.6	Samuel Walker; Canada	83.3	Thomas Scott; England	82.3
1934	Tommy Mather; England	83.83	Doug Tomalin; England	83.63	Louis Marchant; England	70.64
1938	Doug Tomalin; England	108.74	Ron Masters; Australia	102.87	George Athans; Canada	98.93
1950	Peter Heatly; Scotland	156.07	George Athans; Canada	145.36	Frank Murphy; Australia	129.40
1954	William Patrick; Canada	142.7	Kevin Newell; Australia	142.06	Peter Heatly; Scotland	141.32
1958	Peter Heatly; Scotland	147.79	Brian Phelps; England	144.49	Ray Cann; England	138.5
1962	Brian Phelps; England	168.35	Graham Deuble; Australia	151	Tony Kitcher; England	150.81
1966	Brian Phelps; England	164.57	Don Wagstaff; Australia	148.44	Chris Robb; Australia	141.68
1970	Don Wagstaff; Australia	485.73	Philip Drew; England	429.24	Andrew Gill; England	421.47
1974	Don Wagstaff; Australia	490.74	Andrew Jackomos; Australia	472.47	Scott Cranham; Canada	460.98
1978	Chris Snode; England	538.98	Ken Armstrong; Canada	534.99	Scott Cranham; Canada	512.37
1982	Chris Snode; England	588.54	Steve Foley; Australia	524.55	John Nash; Canada	523.41
1986	Craig Rogerson; Australia	600.87	David Bédard; Canada	576.81	Bob Morgan; Wales	561.54
1990	Bob Morgan; Wales	639.84	David Bédard; Canada	555.54	Bruno-Michel Fournier; Canada	544.5
1994	Michael Murphy; Australia	614.7	Bob Morgan; Wales	585.96	Claude Villeneuve; Canada	581.22
1998	Alexandre Despatie; Canada		Robert Newbery; Australia		Leon Taylor; England	
2002	Peter Waterfield; England		Leon Taylor; England		Alexandre Despatie; Canada	
2006	Mathew Helm; Australia	1085.60	Peter Waterfield; England	1030.50	Alexandre Despatie; Canada	1016.95
2010	Tom Daley; England		Matthew Mitcham; Australia		Bryan Nickson Lomas; Malaysia	
2014	Tom Daley; England		Ooi Tze Liang; Malaysia		Vincent Riendeau; Canada	
2018	Domonic Bedggood; Australia	451.15	Matthew Dixon; England	449.55	Vincent Riendeau; Canada	425.40
2022						

=== 3 m synchronised springboard ===
Event	Gold		Silver		Bronze	
2006	Canada; Alexandre Despatie; Arturo Miranda	444.87	England; Tony Ally; Mark Shipman	423.00	Australia; Robert Newbery; Steven Barnett	421.35
2010	Canada; Alexandre Despatie; Reuben Ross		Australia; Matthew Mitcham; Ethan Warren		Malaysia; Bryan Nickson Lomas; Yeoh Ken Nee	
2014	England; Jack Laugher; Chris Mears		Australia; Matthew Mitcham; Grant Nel		England; Nicholas Robinson-Baker; Freddie Woodward	
2018	England; Jack Laugher; Chris Mears	436.17	Canada; Philippe Gagné; François Imbeau-Dulac	415.23	Australia; Domonic Bedggood; Dec Stacey	397.92
2022	England; Jack Laugher; Anthony Harding	438.33	Malaysia; Muhammad Syafiq Puteh; Gabriel Gilbert Daim	376.77	Australia; Li Shixin; Sam Fricker	374.52

=== 10 m synchronised platform ===
Event	Gold		Silver		Bronze	
2006	Australia; Mathew Helm; Robert Newbery	440.58	Malaysia; Bryan Nickson Lomas; James Sandayud	427.44	England; Callum Johnstone; Gary Hunt	404.82
2010	England; Max Brick; Tom Daley		Australia; Matthew Mitcham; Ethan Warren		Canada; Eric Sehn; Kevin Geyson	
2014	Australia; Matthew Mitcham; Domonic Bedggood		England; Tom Daley; James Denny		Not awarded	
2018	England; Tom Daley; Daniel Goodfellow	405.81	England; Matthew Dixon; Noah Williams	399.99	Australia; Domonic Bedggood; Dec Stacey	397.92
2022	England; Noah Williams; Matty Lee	429.78	Canada; Rylan Wiens; Nathan Zsombor-Murray	413.85	Australia; Cassiel Rousseau; Domonic Bedggood	412.56

== Women's ==
=== 1 m springboard ===
Event	Gold		Silver		Bronze	
1990	Mary DePiero; Canada	443.28	Tracy Cox; Zimbabwe	423.93	Peta Taylor; Australia	418.71
1994	Annie Pelletier; Canada	279.66	Jodie Rogers; Australia	252.72	Mary DePiero; Canada	245.34
1998	Étienne Leblanc-Brillon; Australia		Blythe Hartley; Canada		Eryn Bulmer; Canada	
2002	Irina Lashko; Australia		Blythe Hartley; Canada		Jane Smith; England	
2006	Blythe Hartley; Canada	644.65	Sharleen Stratton; Australia	596.45	Kathryn Blackshaw; Australia	544.40
2010	Jennifer Abel; Canada		Sharleen Stratton; Australia		Émilie Heymans; Canada	
2014	Jennifer Abel; Canada		Maddison Keeney; Australia		Esther Qin; Australia	
2018	Grace Reid; Scotland	275.30	Georgia Sheehan; Australia	264.00	Esther Qin; Australia	252.95
2022	Mia Vallée; Canada	291.85	Brittany O'Brien; Australia	279.60	Amy Rollinson; England	272.00

=== 3 m springboard ===
Event	Gold		Silver		Bronze	
1930	Oonagh Whitsett; South Africa	90.1	Doris Ogilvie; Canada	89.7	Mollie Bailey; Canada	88.7
1934	Judith Moss; Canada	62.27	Lesley Thompson; Australia	60.49	Doris Ogilvie; Canada	57.00
1938	Irene Donnett; Australia	91.18	Lynda Adams; Canada	88.27	Marie Sharkey; Canada	81.66
1950	Edna Child; England	126.58	Noeline MacLean; Australia	124.59	Lynda Hunt; Canada	115.38
1954	Ann Long; England	128.26	Barbara McAulay; Australia	127.74	Irene MacDonald; Canada	126.19
1958	Charmain Welsh; England	118.81	Irene MacDonald; Canada	117.01	Elizabeth Ferris; England	113.3
1962	Susan Knight; Australia	134.72	Elizabeth Ferris; England	132.74	Lorraine McArthur; Australia	125.13
1966	Kathy Rowlatt; England	147.1	Beverly Boys; Canada	134.92	Susan Knight; Australia	134.9
1970	Beverly Boys; Canada	432.87	Elizabeth Carruthers; Canada	391.2	Gaye Morley; Australia	389.04
1974	Cindy Shatto; Canada	430.88	Beverly Boys; Canada	426.93	Teri York; Canada	413.83
1978	Janet Nutter; Canada	477.33	Beverly Boys; Canada	469.95	Eniko Kiefer; Canada	447.42
1982	Jenny Donnet; Australia	484.65	Sylvie Bernier; Canada	478.83	Valerie Beddoe; Australia	446.63
1986	Debbie Fuller; Canada	513.09	Jenny Donnet; Australia	494.52	Kathy Kelemen; Canada	484.65
1990	Jenny Donnet; Australia	491.79	Barbara Bush; Canada	458.43	Nicky Cooney; New Zealand	457.29
1994	Annie Pelletier; Canada	529.86	Paige Gordon; Canada	529.08	Jodie Rogers; Australia	474.81
1998	Eryn Bulmer; Canada		Chantelle Michell; Australia		Myriam Boileau; Canada	
2002	Irina Lashko; Australia		Émilie Heymans; Canada		Jane Smith; England	
2006	Blythe Hartley; Canada	690.05	Chantelle Newbery; Australia	681.30	Kathryn Blackshaw; Australia	629.00
2010	Sharleen Stratton; Australia		Jennifer Abel; Canada		Jaele Patrick; Australia	
2014	Esther Qin; Australia		Jennifer Abel; Canada		Hannah Starling; England	
2018	Jennifer Abel; Canada	366.95	Maddison Keeney; Australia	366.55	Anabelle Smith; Australia	336.90
2022						

=== 10 m platform ===
Event	Gold		Silver		Bronze	
1930	Pearl Stoneham; Canada	39.3	Helen McCormack; Canada	38.3	none awarded	
1934	Dot Macready; England	30.74	Lesley Thompson; Australia	27.64	Cecily Cousens; England	27.36
1938	Lurline Hook; Australia	36.47	Lynda Adams; Canada	36.39	Irene Donnett; Australia	34.57
1950	Edna Child; England	70.89	Gwen Fawcett; Australia	65.64	Noeline MacLean; Australia	59.93
1954	Barbara McAulay; Australia	86.55	Eunice Millar; England	79.86	Ann Long; England	79.53
1958	Charmain Welsh; England	77.23	Ann Long; England	73.69	Molly Wieland; England	65.82
1962	Susan Knight; Australia	101.15	Margaret Austen; England	98.93	Patricia Plowman; Australia	91.79
1966	Joy Newman; England	98.87	Robyn Bradshaw; Australia	98.85	Beverly Boys; Canada	97.21
1970	Beverly Boys; Canada	352.95	Nancy Robertson; Canada	350.49	Shelagh Burrow; England	330.63
1974	Beverly Boys; Canada	361.95	Beverly Williams; England	352.14	Madeleine Barnett; Australia	339.3
1978	Linda Cuthbert; Canada	397.44	Valerie McFarlane; Australia	383.4	Janet Nutter; Canada	374.67
1982	Valerie Beddoe; Australia	404.16	Jennifer McArton; Canada	390.21	Kathy Kelemen; Canada	359.31
1986	Debbie Fuller; Canada	431.61	Valerie Beddoe; Australia	414.78	Julie Kent; Australia	411.13
1990	Anna Dacyshyn; Canada	391.68	April Adams; Australia	380.49	Paige Gordon; Canada	380.43
1994	Anne Montminy; Canada	428.58	Paige Gordon; Canada	414.36	Myriam Boileau; Canada	411.21
1998	Vyninka Arlow; Australia		Myriam Boileau; Canada		Anne Montminy; Canada	
2002	Loudy Tourky; Australia		Émilie Heymans; Canada		Blythe Hartley; Canada	
2006	Loudy Tourky; Australia	737.75	Chantelle Newbery; Australia	733.55	Émilie Heymans; Canada	733.50
2010	Pandelela Rinong; Malaysia		Melissa Wu; Australia		Alex Croak; Australia	
2014	Meaghan Benfeito; Canada		Pandelela Rinong; Malaysia		Roseline Filion; Canada	
2018	Melissa Wu; Australia	360.40	Meaghan Benfeito; Canada	359.75	Lois Toulson; England	344.20
2022	Andrea Spendolini-Sirieix; England	357.50	Lois Toulson; England	337.30	Caeli McKay; Canada	317.50

=== 3 m synchronised springboard ===
Event	Gold		Silver		Bronze	
2006	Australia; Briony Cole; Sharleen Stratton	296.07	Canada; Melanie Rinaldi; Rebecca Barras	273.72	England; Hayley Sage; Tandi Indergaard	270.63
2010	Canada; Jennifer Abel; Émilie Heymans		Australia; Briony Cole; Sharleen Stratton		Australia; Jaele Patrick; Olivia Wright	
2014	England; Alicia Blagg; Rebecca Gallantree		Canada; Jennifer Abel; Pamela Ware		Australia; Maddison Keeney; Anabelle Smith	
2018	Australia; Esther Qin; Georgia Sheehan	284.10	England; Alicia Blagg; Katherine Torrance	276.90	Malaysia; Leong Mun Yee; Nur Dhabitah Sabri	264.90
2022	Australia; Maddison Keeney; Anabelle Smith	316.53	Malaysia; Ng Yan Yee; Nur Dhabitah Sabri	299.85	Canada; Margo Erlam; Mia Vallée	297.00

=== 10 m synchronised platform ===
Event	Gold		Silver		Bronze	
2006	Australia; Chantelle Newbery; Loudy Tourky	317.58	Australia; Alex Croak; Melissa Wu	309.90	Canada; Meaghan Benfeito; Roseline Filion	303.15
2010	Australia; Melissa Wu; Alex Croak		Malaysia; Pandelela Rinong; Leong Mun Yee		Australia; Briony Cole; Anabelle Smith	
2014	Canada; Meaghan Benfeito; Roseline Filion		England; Sarah Barrow; Tonia Couch		Malaysia; Pandelela Rinong; Nur Dhabitah Sabri	
2018	Malaysia; Cheong Jun Hoong; Pandelela Rinong	328.08	Canada; Meaghan Benfeito; Caeli McKay	312.12	Malaysia; Leong Mun Yee; Nur Dhabitah Sabri	308.16
2022						

== Mixed ==
=== 3 m synchronised springboard ===
Event	Gold	Silver	Bronze
2022			

=== 10 m synchronised platform ===
Event	Gold	Silver	Bronze
2022			
