= Diving at the 1972 Summer Olympics – Men's 3 metre springboard =

Men's 3 metre springboard at the Games of the XX Olympiad

Medalists
1st place, gold medalist(s)		Vladimir Vasin	Soviet Union
2nd place, silver medalist(s)		Franco Cagnotto	Italy
3rd place, bronze medalist(s)		Craig Lincoln	United States

The men's 3 metre springboard, also reported as springboard diving, was one of four diving events on the Diving at the 1972 Summer Olympics programme.

The competition was split into two phases:

1. Preliminary round (29 August)
  Divers performed eight dives. The twelve divers with the highest scores advanced to the final.
2. Final (30 August)
  Divers performed three voluntary dives without limit of degrees of difficulty. The final ranking was determined by the combined score with the preliminary round.

== Results ==
Rank	Diver	Nation	Preliminary		Final		
Rank	Diver	Nation	Points	Rank	Points	Rank	Total
1st place, gold medalist(s)	Vladimir Vasin	Soviet Union	387.72	3	206.37	1	594.09
2nd place, silver medalist(s)	Franco Cagnotto	Italy	400.95	1	190.68	2	591.63
3rd place, bronze medalist(s)	Craig Lincoln	United States	386.79	4	190.50	3	577.29
4	Klaus Dibiasi	Italy	380.16	6	178.89	4	559.05
5	Michael Finneran	United States	378.84	7	178.50	5	557.34
6	Vyacheslav Strakhov	Soviet Union	392.10	2	164.10	10	556.20
7	Falk Hoffmann	East Germany	384.45	5	160.50	11	544.95
8	Norbert Huda	West Germany	355.29	9	168.87	8	524.16
9	Carlos Girón	Mexico	345.21	11	176.67	6	521.88
10	Roar Løken	Norway	344.55	12	170.37	7	514.92
11	José Robinson	Mexico	348.48	10	165.54	9	514.02
12	Helge Ziethen	East Germany	364.02	8	147.00	12	511.02
13	Donald Wagstaff	Australia	344.13	13	did not advance		
14	Scott Cranham	Canada	339.21	14	did not advance		
15	Pentti Koskinen	Finland	336.99	15	did not advance		
16	Kenneth Sully	Canada	336.12	16	did not advance		
17	Christopher Walls	Great Britain	332.07	17	did not advance		
18	Vladimir Kapirulin	Soviet Union	329.46	18	did not advance		
19	Gerhard Hölzl	West Germany	327.42	19	did not advance		
20	David Bush	United States	327.06	20	did not advance		
21	Ion Ganea	Romania	325.17	21	did not advance		
22	Alain Goosen	France	322.41	22	did not advance		
23	John Baker	Great Britain	321.15	23	did not advance		
24	Junji Yuasa	Japan	316.95	24	did not advance		
25	Ron Friesen	Canada	313.11	25	did not advance		
26	Salim Barjum	Colombia	310.86	26	did not advance		
27	Porfirio Becerril	Mexico	310.65	27	did not advance		
28	Brian Wetheridge	Great Britain	310.53	28	did not advance		
29	Kenneth Grove	Australia	302.91	29	did not advance		
30	Reinhard von Bauer	West Germany	299.79	30	did not advance		
31	Rudolf Kruspel	Austria	293.58	31	did not advance		
32	Josef Kien	Austria	285.30	32	did not advance		

== Sources ==
- Organising Committee for the Games of the XX Olympiad (1974). The Official Report for the Games of the XX Olympiad Munich 1972 (PDF). Vol. 3: The competitions. proSport GmbH & Co, KG, München. p. 349.
