= British Diving Championships – 3 metre springboard diving winners =

British diving competition

The British Diving Championships - 3 metre springboard winners formerly the (Amateur Swimming Association (ASA) National Championships) are listed below.

The diving championships were part of the National Swimming Championships for 13 years until 1965 when it separated.

The championships were not held in 2021 due to the COVID-19 pandemic.

== Past winners ==
Year	Men's champion	Women's champion	Ref
1953	Tony Turner	Charmain Welsh	
1954	Tony Turner	Charmain Welsh	
1955	Peter Tarsey	Ann Long	
1956	Peter Tarsey	Ann Long	
1957	Peter Squires	Ann Long	
1958	Keith Collin	Ann Long	
1959	Peter Squires	Marion Watson	
1960	Brian Phelps	Elizabeth Ferris	
1961	Brian Phelps	Norma Thomas	
1962	Brian Phelps	Elizabeth Ferris	
1963	Keith Collin	Joy Newman	
1964	Dennis Young	Kathy Rowlatt	
1965	Frank Carter	Judy Stewart	
1966	Frank Carter	Janet Dickens	
1967	Frank Carter	Kathy Rowlatt	
1968	Frank Carter	Kathy Rowlatt	
1969	Alan Roberts		
1970	Joseph Thewlis		
1971	Christopher Walls	Alison Drake	
1972	Brian Wetheridge	Alison Drake	
1973	Trevor Simpson	Helen Koppell	
1974	Chris Snode	Alison Drake	
1975	Chris Snode	Linda Carwardine	
1976			
1977			
1978			
1979			
1980	Chris Snode	Alison Drake	
1981			
1982			
1983			
1984			
1985			
1986	Andy Budd		
1987			
1988			
1989			
1990			
1991			
1992			
1993			
1994			
1995			
1996			
1997			
1998			
1999			
2000			
2001			
2002			
2003			
2004			
2005			
2006	Ben Swain	Rebecca Gallantree	
2007	Blake Aldridge	Hayley Sage	
2008	Ben Swain	Jodie McGroarty	
2009	Charles Calvert	Rebecca Gallantree	
2010	Nicholas Robinson-Baker	Rebecca Gallantree	
2011	Jack Laugher	Rebecca Gallantree	
2012	Jack Laugher	Rebecca Gallantree	
2013	Jack Laugher	Grace Reid	
2014	James Denny	Alicia Blagg	
2015	Jack Haslam	Rebecca Gallantree	
2016	Jack Laugher	Grace Reid	
2017	Ross Haslam	Katherine Torrance	
2018	Jack Haslam	Alicia Blagg	
2019	James Heatly	Scarlett Mew Jensen	
2020	James Heatly	Maria Papworth Burrel	
2022	Jack Laugher	Yasmin Harper	
2023	Jordan Houlden	Yasmin Harper	
2024	Jack Laugher	Yasmin Harper	
2025	Jordan Houlden	Amy Rollinson	

== See also ==
- British Swimming
