= Diving at the 1972 Summer Olympics – Men's 10 metre platform =

Men's 10 metre platform at the Games of the XX Olympiad

Medalists
1st place, gold medalist(s)		Klaus Dibiasi	Italy
2nd place, silver medalist(s)		Richard Rydze	United States
3rd place, bronze medalist(s)		Giorgio Cagnotto	Italy

The men's 10 metre platform, also reported as platform diving, was one of four diving events on the Diving at the 1972 Summer Olympics programme.

The competition was split into two phases:

1. Preliminary round (3 September)
  Divers performed seven dives. The twelve divers with the highest scores advanced to the final.
2. Final (4 September)
  Divers performed three voluntary dives without limit of degrees of difficulty. The final ranking was determined by the combined score with the preliminary round.

== Results ==
Rank	Diver	Nation	Preliminary		Final		
Rank	Diver	Nation	Points	Rank	Points	Rank	Total
1st place, gold medalist(s)	Klaus Dibiasi	Italy	338.25	1	165.87	4	504.12
2nd place, silver medalist(s)	Richard Rydze	United States	302.16	5	178.59	1	480.75
3rd place, bronze medalist(s)	Franco Cagnotto	Italy	312.93	3	162.90	5	475.83
4	Lothar Matthes	East Germany	298.41	6	167.34	3	465.75
5	David Ambartsumyan	Soviet Union	314.31	2	149.25	8	463.56
6	Richard Earley	United States	287.94	12	174.51	2	462.45
7	Vladimir Kapyrulin	Soviet Union	296.40	7	162.81	6	459.21
8	Carlos Girón	Mexico	290.37	10	152.04	7	442.41
9	Michael Finneran	United States	289.80	11	140.67	11	439.47
10	Falk Hoffmann	East Germany	291.54	8	145.17	10	436.71
11	Donald Wagstaff	Australia	290.64	9	145.20	9	435.84
12	Aleksandr Gendrikson	Soviet Union	305.94	4	125.10	12	431.04
13	Jacques Deschouwer	France	287.04	13	did not advance		
14	José Robinson	Mexico	284.58	14	did not advance		
15	Porfirio Becerril	Mexico	282.57	15	did not advance		
16	Karl-Heinz Schwemmer	West Germany	281.55	16	did not advance		
17	Jakub Puchow	Poland	281.34	17	did not advance		
18	Niki Stajković	Austria	280.29	18	did not advance		
19	Junji Yuasa	Japan	276.00	19	did not advance		
20	Ron Friesen	Canada	272.94	20	did not advance		
21	Frank Dufficy	Great Britain	271.77	21	did not advance		
22	Andrew Gill	Great Britain	268.68	22	did not advance		
23	Wolfram Ristau	East Germany	268.59	23	did not advance		
24	Bernd Wucherpfennig	West Germany	267.87	24	did not advance		
25	Ion Ganea	Romania	265.83	25	did not advance		
26	Diego Heñao	Colombia	264.27	26	did not advance		
27	Scott Cranham	Canada	263.52	27	did not advance		
28	Brian Wetheridge	Great Britain	262.59	28	did not advance		
29	Kenneth Sully	Canada	262.26	29	did not advance		
30	Klaus Konzorr	West Germany	260.01	30	did not advance		
31	Héctor Bas	Puerto Rico	254.79	31	did not advance		
32	Kenneth Grove	Australia	254.73	32	did not advance		
33	Rudolf Kruspel	Austria	248.07	33	did not advance		
34	Jorge Head	Spain	243.27	34	did not advance		
35	Sandro Rossi	Switzerland	225.87	35	did not advance		

== Sources ==
- Organising Committee for the Games of the XX Olympiad (1974). The Official Report for the Games of the XX Olympiad Munich 1972 (PDF). Vol. 3: The competitions. proSport GmbH & Co, KG, München. p. 350.
