= Canada at the 1968 Summer Olympics =

- IOC code: CAN
- NOC: Canadian Olympic Committee

in Mexico City
- Competitors: 139 (111 men and 28 women) in 14 sports
- Flag bearer: Roger Jackson
- Medals Ranked 23rd: Gold 1 Silver 3 Bronze 1 Total 5

Summer Olympics appearances (overview)
- ~~1900~~; 1904; 1908; 1912; 1920; 1924; 1928; 1932; 1936; 1948; 1952; 1956; 1960; 1964; 1968; 1972; 1976; 1980; 1984; 1988; 1992; 1996; 2000; 2004; 2008; 2012; 2016; 2020; 2024; 2028

Other related appearances
- 1906 Intercalated Games

Canada competed at the 1968 Summer Olympics in Mexico City, Mexico, held from 12 to 27 October 1968 . 139 competitors, 111 men and 28 women, took part in 124 events in 14 sports. It is the inaugural Summer Olympics where the Canadian team marched under the new Maple Leaf flag. The youngest competitor for Canada was gymnast Theresa McDonnell who was 14 years old. The oldest competitor was equestrian Zoltan Sztehlo who was 46 years old.

== Medallists ==
=== Gold ===
- Jim Day, Thomas Gayford, James Elder – Equestrian, team jumping grand prix

=== Silver ===
- Elaine Tanner – Swimming, women's 100 m backstroke
- Elaine Tanner – Swimming, women's 200 m backstroke
- Ralph Hutton – Swimming, men's 400 m freestyle

=== Bronze ===
- Angela Coughlan, Marilyn Corson-Whitney, Elaine Tanner, and Marion Lay – Swimming, women's 4×100 m freestyle relay

== Athletics ==
Women's javelin throw

- Jay Dahlgren placed 13th

Women's pentathlon

- Jenny Meldrum placed 11th

Women's 800 metres

- Abigail Hoffman placed 7th

Men's 100 metres

- Harry Jerome placed 7th

Men's 5000 metres

- Bob Finlay placed 11th

Men's marathon

- Andy Boychuk placed 10th

== Cycling ==
Six cyclists represented Canada in 1968.

Individual road race

- Marcel Roy
- Joe Jones
- Jules Béland
- Yves Landry

Team time trial

- Joe Jones
- Jules Béland
- Marcel Roy
- Yves Landry

Sprint

- Jocelyn Lovell
- Bob Boucher

1000m time trial

- Jocelyn Lovell

== Diving ==
Men

Athlete	Event	Preliminary		Final			
Athlete	Event	Points	Rank	Points	Rank	Total	Rank
Kenneth Sully	3 m springboard	74.62	25	Did not advance			
Bob Eaton	10 m platform	82.09	25	Did not advance			
Kenneth Sully	10 m platform	65.41	33	Did not advance			

Women

Athlete	Event	Preliminary		Final			
Athlete	Event	Points	Rank	Points	Rank	Total	Rank
Beverly Boys	3 m springboard	86.86	10 Q	43.45	5	130.31	7
Nancy Robertson	3 m springboard	82.21	13	Did not advance			
Beverly Boys	10 m platform	44.65	11 Q	53.32	2	97.97	4
Nancy Robertson	10 m platform	44.10	12 Q	46.56	3	90.66	8

== Equestrian ==
Jumping Individual- James Elder placed 6th out of 7 in the final

Jumping Team- James Elder, James Day and Thomas Gayford.

== Fencing ==
Five fencers, four men and one woman, represented Canada in 1968.

Men's foil

- Gerry Wiedel
- Magdy Conyd
- Peter Bakonyi

Men's team foil

- Magdy Conyd, Peter Bakonyi, Gerry Wiedel, John Andru

Men's épée

- Peter Bakonyi
- Magdy Conyd
- Gerry Wiedel

Men's team épée

- Peter Bakonyi, John Andru, Magdy Conyd, Gerry Wiedel

Men's sabre

- John Andru

Women's foil

- Sigrid Chatel

== Rowing ==
There were seven rowing events for men only and Canada entered four boats. In the eight, John Richardson in seat 5 was replaced with Daryl Sturdy in the B final.

== Shooting ==
Ten shooters, all male, represented Canada in 1968.

25 m pistol

- Jules Sobrian
- Keith Elder

50 m pistol

- William Hare
- Jules Sobrian

50 m rifle, three positions

- Gerry Ouellette
- Alf Mayer

50 m rifle, prone

- Gerry Ouellette
- Rudy Schulze

Trap

- John Primrose
- Edward Shaske

Skeet

- Donald Sanderlin
- Harry Willsie

== Weightlifting ==
Athlete	Event	Weight	Rank
Chun Hon Chan	56 kg	310.0	11
Aldo Roy	82.5 kg	420.0	15
Pierre St. Jean	82.5 kg	435.0	10
Paul Bjarnason	90 kg	407.5	21
