= Diving at the 1974 British Commonwealth Games =

Diving competition

- Venue: QEII Leisure Centre, Queen Elizabeth II Park
- Location: Christchurch, New Zealand
- Dates: 24 January to 2 February 1974
- Nations: 6

Diving at the 1974 British Commonwealth Games was the tenth appearance of the Diving at the Commonwealth Games. The events were held in Christchurch, New Zealand from 24 January to 2 February 1974 and featured contests in four devents.

New Zealand's neighbor Australia won gold medals on each of the two men's diving events, the 3-metre and 10-metre respectively by Don Wagstaff, who had also won both gold medals at the 1970 Commonwealth Games diving event. Australia collected 4 medals in total, while Canada took 6 in total, of which 2 were also gold.

Australia collected gold medals from each of the men's diving competitions, but would have to wait another twelve years until the 1986 Commonwealth Games before winning a gold medal in diving again.

Canada had a clean sweep of medals in the women's 3 metre platform event, the first time that had happened since the event's inception dating back to the inaugural 1930 British Empire Games. Canada also collected gold across both the 3 metre and 10 metre events from Cindy Shatto and Beverly Boys respectively. The event would be the last for Cindy Shatto, who chose to retire from competitive diving on the eve of the 1978 Commonwealth Games.

== Medal table ==
* Host nation (New Zealand)

Rank	Nation	Gold	Silver	Bronze	Total
1	Canada	2	2	2	6
2	Australia	2	1	1	4
3	England	0	1	1	2
Totals (3 entries)		4	4	4	12

== Medallists ==
Event	Gold		Silver		Bronze	
Men
3 Metres Springboard Diving	Don Wagstaff; Australia	531.54	Scott Cranham; Canada	509.61	Trevor Simpson; England	489.69
10 Metres Highboard [Platform] Diving	Don Wagstaff; Australia	490.74	Andrew Jackomos; Australia	472.47	Scott Cranham; Canada	470.98
Women
3 Metres Springboard Diving	Cindy Shatto; Canada	430.88	Beverly Boys; Canada	426.93	Teri York; Canada	413.83
10 Metres Highboard [Platform] Diving	Beverly Boys; Canada	361.95	Beverly Williams; England	352.14	Madeleine Barnett; Australia	339.3

== Results ==
=== Men ===
3 metre springboard
Rank	Name	Score
	Don Wagstaff (AUS)	531.54
	Scott Cranham (CAN)	509.61
	Trevor Simpson (ENG)	489.69
4	Ron Friesen (CAN)	487.89
5	Andrew Jackomos (AUS)	457.08
6	Ken Armstrong (CAN)	449.07
7	Cyril Buscke (NZL)	440.73

10 metre platform
Rank	Name	Score
	Don Wagstaff (AUS)	490.74
	Andrew Jackomos (AUS)	472.47
	Scott Cranham (CAN)	460.98
4	Ron Friesen (CAN)	459.15
5	Glen Grout (CAN)	398.16
6	Martyn Brown (ENG)	375.63

=== Women ===
3 metre springboard
Rank	Name	Score
	Cindy Shatto (CAN)	430.88
	Beverly Boys (CAN)	426.93
	Teri York (CAN)	413.83
4	Madeleine Barnett (AUS)	403.56
5	Alison Drake (ENG)	395.49
6	Beverley Donnet-Riley (AUS)	381.39
7	Gaye Morley (AUS)	379.71
8	Rebecca Ewart (NZL)	379.29
9	Karen Conway (NZL)	376.83
10	Margaret Lay (NZL)	354.81
11	Fiona Hotson (SCO)	298.32
12	Winnie Hsu (HKG)	211.53

10 metre platform
Rank	Name	Score
	Beverly Boys (CAN)	361.95
	Beverly Williams (ENG)	352.14
	Madeleine Barnett (AUS)	339.30
4	Linda Cuthbert (CAN)	334.71
5	Teri York (CAN)	324.78
6	Beverley Donnet-Riley (AUS)	300.54
7	Fiona Hotson (SCO)	279.96
8	Gaye Morley (AUS)	279.90
