= Diving at the 1968 Summer Olympics – Men's 3 metre springboard =

Men's 3 metre springboard at the Games of the XIX Olympiad
- Venue: Alberca Olímpica Francisco Marquéz
- Date: 19–20 October 1968 (Preliminary); 20 October 1968 (Final)
- Competitors: 28 from 16 nations

Medalists
1st place, gold medalist(s)		Bernard Wrightson	United States
2nd place, silver medalist(s)		Klaus Dibiasi	Italy
3rd place, bronze medalist(s)		Jim Henry	United States

The men's 3 metre springboard, also reported as springboard diving, was one of four diving events on the Diving at the 1968 Summer Olympics programme. It was the 13th appearance of the event, which has been held at every Olympic Games since the 1908 Summer Olympics.

== Competition format ==
The competition was split into two phases:

1. Preliminary round (19–20 October)
  Divers performed five compulsory dives with limited degrees of difficulty and two voluntary dives without limits. The twelve divers with the highest scores advanced to the final.
2. Final (20 October)
  Divers performed three voluntary dives without limit of degrees of difficulty. The final ranking was determined by the combined score with the preliminary round.

== Schedule ==
All times are Central Time Zone (UTC-6)

Date	Time	Round
Saturday-Sunday, 19–20 October 1968	10:00-17:00	Preliminary
Sunday, 20 October 1968	17:00	Final

== Results ==
Rank	Diver	Nation	Preliminary		Final					
Rank	Diver	Nation	Points	Rank	Dive 1	Dive 2	Dive 3	Points	Rank	Total
1st place, gold medalist(s)	Bernard Wrightson	United States	102.95	3	22.96	21.28	22.96	67.20	1	170.15
2nd place, silver medalist(s)	Klaus Dibiasi	Italy	104.68	2	17.82	17.36	19.88	55.06	4	159.74
3rd place, bronze medalist(s)	Jim Henry	United States	105.47	1	15.12	21.84	15.66	52.62	5	158.09
4	Luis Nino De Rivera	Mexico	99.13	6	18.48	17.94	20.16	56.58	3	155.71
5	Franco Cagnotto	Italy	95.92	9	18.90	18.76	22.12	59.78	2	155.70
6	Keith Russell	United States	100.61	4	15.68	14.00	21.46	51.14	8	151.75
7	Tord Andersson	Sweden	99.58	5	19.04	16.24	16.64	51.92	7	151.50
8	Donald Wagstaff	Australia	97.84	7	19.24	17.42	15.68	52.34	6	150.18
9	Mikhail Safonov	Soviet Union	92.77	12	12.04	17.36	18.85	48.25	9	141.02
10	Ulrich Reff	West Germany	95.42	11	12.04	16.52	16.10	44.66	10	140.08
11	Vladimir Vasin	Soviet Union	95.73	10	14.56	11.48	17.82	43.86	11	139.59
12	Pentti Koskinen	Finland	95.99	8	16.33	16.52	8.96	41.81	12	137.80
13	José Robinson	Mexico	91.45	13	did not advance					
14	Jorge Telch	Mexico	90.68	14	did not advance					
15	Jakub Puchow	Poland	88.65	15	did not advance					
16	Norbert Huda	West Germany	88.43	16	did not advance					
17	Italo Salice	Italy	87.86	17	did not advance					
18	Junji Yuasa	Japan	86.80	18	did not advance					
19	Frank Carter	Great Britain	85.90	19	did not advance					
20	Boris Polulyakh	Soviet Union	84.32	20	did not advance					
21	Jerzy Kowalewski	Poland	79.97	21	did not advance					
22	Song Jae-Ung	South Korea	79.66	22	did not advance					
23	Alberto Moreno	Cuba	76.80	23	did not advance					
24	Salim Barjum	Colombia	76.19	24	did not advance					
25	Kenneth Sully	Canada	74.62	25	did not advance					
26	José Luis Ponce	Cuba	72.72	26	did not advance					
27	Jerry Anderson	Puerto Rico	68.83	27	did not advance					
28	Héctor Bas	Puerto Rico	62.43	28	did not advance					
-	Salvador Pérez	Dominican Republic	DNS	-	did not advance					
-	Hakon Loken	Norway	DNS	-	did not advance					

== Sources ==
- Organising Committee of the Games of the XIX Olympiad (October 1969). The Official Report of the Games of the XIX Olympiad Mexico 1968, Volume 3: The Games (pdf) (in French and English). Mexico: The Organising Committee for The Games of the XVIII Olympiad.
