= Telch =

Telch is a surname. Notable people with this surname include:

- Ari Telch (born 1962), Mexican actor
- Christian Telch (born 1988), German footballer
- Jorge Telch (born 1942), Mexican diver
- Michael Telch (born 1953), American psychologist
- Roberto Telch (1943–2014), Argentine footballer
