= Diving at the 1976 Summer Olympics – Men's 10 metre platform =

Men's 10 metre platform at the Games of the XXI Olympiad

Medalists
1st place, gold medalist(s)		Klaus Dibiasi	Italy
2nd place, silver medalist(s)		Greg Louganis	United States
3rd place, bronze medalist(s)		Vladimir Aleynik	Soviet Union

The men's 10 metre platform , also reported as platform diving, was one of four diving events on the Diving at the 1976 Summer Olympics programme.

The competition was split into two phases:

1. Preliminary round (26 July)
  Divers performed ten dives. The eight divers with the highest scores advanced to the final.
2. Final (27 July)
  Divers performed another set of ten dives and the score here obtained determined the final ranking.

== Results ==
Rank	Diver	Nation	Preliminary		Final
Rank	Diver	Nation	Points	Rank	Points
1st place, gold medalist(s)	Klaus Dibiasi	Italy	570.54	2	600.51
2nd place, silver medalist(s)	Greg Louganis	United States	583.50	1	576.99
3rd place, bronze medalist(s)	Vladimir Aleynik	Soviet Union	526.83	6	548.61
4	Kent Vosler	United States	554.37	3	544.14
5	Patrick Moore	United States	510.75	8	538.17
6	Falk Hoffmann	East Germany	513.96	7	531.60
7	David Ambartsumyan	Soviet Union	532.89	5	516.21
8	Carlos Girón	Mexico	540.75	4	513.93
9	Sergey Nemtsanov	Soviet Union	502.26	9	Did not advance
10	Dieter Waskow	East Germany	497.16	10	Did not advance
11	Frank Taubert	East Germany	494.95	11	Did not advance
12	Niki Stajković	Austria	486.69	12	Did not advance
13	Claudio De Miro	Italy	470.43	13	Did not advance
14	Ken Armstrong	Canada	467.13	14	Did not advance
15	Donald Wagstaff	Australia	454.25	15	Did not advance
16	Yoshino Nishide	Japan	450.75	16	Did not advance
17	Scott Cranham	Canada	439.80	17	Did not advance
18	Dieter Dörr	West Germany	438.96	18	Did not advance
19	Ricardo Velarde	Mexico	438.48	19	Did not advance
20	Joël Suty	France	426.72	20	Did not advance
21	Milton Braga	Brazil	424.68	21	Did not advance
22	Glen Grout	Canada	419.46	22	Did not advance
23	Martyn Brown	Great Britain	413.34	23	Did not advance
24	Steve Foley	Australia	396.90	24	Did not advance
25	Nelson Suárez	Ecuador	396.59	25	Did not advance
-	Michael Worisch	Austria	DNS	-	Did not advance
-	Norbert Huda	West Germany	DNS	-	Did not advance
-	Franco Cagnotto	Italy	DNS	-	Did not advance
-	Jamal Al-Ghareeb	Kuwait	DNS	-	Did not advance

== Sources ==
- The Official Report for the Games of the XXIst Olympiad Montréal 1976 - Volume 3: Results (pdf). Ottawa: Organizing Committee for the Games of the XXIst Olympiad, Montréal 1976 (COJO 76). 1978. pp. p. 483.
