= Diving at the 1970 British Commonwealth Games =

Diving competition

- Venue: Royal Commonwealth Pool
- Location: Edinburgh, Scotland
- Dates: 16 to 25 July 1970
- Nations: 7

Diving at the 1970 British Commonwealth Games was the ninth appearance of the Diving at the Commonwealth Games. The events were held in Edinburgh, Scotland, from 16 to 25 July 1970 and featured contests in four events at the purpose-built Royal Commonwealth Pool.

Canada performed the strongest at the event, winning 6 medals overall, including the gold and silver at both women's events. Canada missed out on a clean sweep of medals on the women's event by a small margin, with Australia's Gaye Morley beating Canada's Nancy Robertson on the 3m event by less than 4 points, while on the 10m event, Canada's Kathleen Rollo missed out on a bronze medal to England's Shelagh Burrow by just 0.3 points. All four girls were described as being "overcome by the tension" in what were emotional scenes. On winning the 3m event, Beverley Boys conveyed that she did not feel as confident in that event as she was feeling for the upcoming 10m tower event. Her total score of 432.87 in the 3m event was her highest ever achieved in an international competition.

Canada's overall performance at the event was praised by The Brandon Sun, who described the country as being a "dominant power in Commonwealth Games diving", following the second gold medal won by Beverley Boys. The 1970 women's diving event was the start of a gold medal winning streak for the Canadian team that would last until the 1982 Commonwealth Games, where Canadian women competitors had to settle for silver medals.

Don Wagstaff, who picked up gold in both of the men's events, became the first Australian man to win a gold medal in a springboard event at any previous Olympic or Commonwealth Games. Wagstaff was described as having given "the best exhibition of spring-board diving seen by an Australian", which was witnessed by his mum who had to save $1000 to travel to the games.

In each of the four events, competitors from the host country Scotland finished last.

== Medal table ==
* Host nation (Scotland)

Medals table by nation
Rank	Nation	Gold	Silver	Bronze	Total
1	Canada	2	3	1	6
2	Australia	2	0	1	3
3	England	0	1	2	3
Totals (3 entries)		4	4	4	12

== Medallists ==
Medal winners by event
Event	Gold		Silver		Bronze	
Event	Athlete	Points	Athlete	Points	Athlete	Points
3 Metres Springboard Diving, Men	Don Wagstaff; Australia	557.73	Ken Sully; Canada	497.37	Ronald Friesen; Canada	495.9
10 Metres Highboard [Platform] Diving, Men	Don Wagstaff; Australia	485.73	Philip Drew; England	429.24	Andy Gill; England	421.47
3 Metres Springboard Diving, Women	Beverly Boys; Canada	432.87	Elizabeth Carruthers; Canada	391.2	Gaye Morley; Australia	389.04
10 Metres Highboard [Platform] Diving, Women	Beverly Boys; Canada	352.95	Nancy Robertson; Canada	350.49	Shelagh Burrow; England	330.63

== Results ==
=== Men ===
3 metre springboard result, men
Rank	Name	Score
1st place, gold medalist(s)	Don Wagstaff (AUS)	557.73
2nd place, silver medalist(s)	Ken Sully (CAN)	497.37
3rd place, bronze medalist(s)	Ronald Friesen (CAN)	495.90
4	Brian Wetheridge (ENG)	465.54
5	Joseph Thewlis (ENG)	464.79
6	Mark Gazley (NZL)	436.44
7	John Baker (ENG)	435.21
8	Maurice Campbell (SCO)	402.81

10 metre platform result, men
Rank	Name	Score
1st place, gold medalist(s)	Don Wagstaff (AUS)	485.73
2nd place, silver medalist(s)	Philip Drew (ENG)	429.24
3rd place, bronze medalist(s)	Andy Gill (ENG)	421.47
4	Ken Sully (CAN)	401.31
5	Bob Eaton (CAN)	399.99
6	Ronald Friesen (CAN)	390.12
7	Maurice Campbell (SCO)	354.15

=== Women ===
Result for women's 3 metre springboard
Rank	Name	Score
1st place, gold medalist(s)	Beverly Boys (CAN)	432.87
2nd place, silver medalist(s)	Elizabeth Carruthers (CAN)	391.20
3rd place, bronze medalist(s)	Gaye Morley (AUS)	389.04
4	Nancy Robertson (CAN)	385.59
5	Madeleine Bollinger (AUS)	385.47
6	Alison Drake (ENG)	369.48
7	Una Ewart (MRI)	337.74
8	Ann McCarroll (SCO)	292.05

Result for women's 10 metre platform
Rank	Name	Score
1st place, gold medalist(s)	Beverly Boys (CAN)	361.95
2nd place, silver medalist(s)	Nancy Robertson (CAN)	350.49
3rd place, bronze medalist(s)	Shelagh Burrow (ENG)	330.63
4	Kathleen Rollo (CAN)	330.33
5	Madeleine Bollinger (AUS)	321.72
6	Jane Hamilton (WAL)	308.70
7	Gaye Morley (AUS)	306.93
8	Jennifer Emery (SCO)	261.15
