= Eniko Kiefer =

Canadian diver (born 1960)

Personal information
- Born: 12 August 1960 (age 65) Montreal, Quebec, Canada
- Height: 155 cm (61 in)
- Weight: 55 kg (121 lb)

Sport
- Sport: Diving
- Coached by: Dezso Kiefer (father)
Medal record
Women's diving
Representing Canada
Commonwealth Games
Bronze medal – third place	1978 Edmonton	3 m springboard

Eniko Kiefer (born 12 August 1960) is a Canadian diver. She competed in the women's 3 metre springboard event at the 1976 Summer Olympics. During the 1978 Commonwealth Games in Edmonton, she won a bronze medal in the 3 meter women's springboard event.

In her earlier years, she competed in gymnastics from the age of two up to about seven, when she made a decision to fully concentrate on diving under the coaching of her father, Dezso Kiefer, due to the higher risk of injury associated with gymnastics. During her early diving career, she was compared to Cindy Shatto and in 1975, became only the second Canadian diver to break the 400 point barrier in an age class competition. By this time, she was ranked third nationally and was unanimously considered among coaches as being "the best in the world". She was selected to represent the Canadian national diving team at the 1980 Summer Olympics in Moscow before Canada announced a boycott of the event in protest of the Soviet invasion of Afghanistan. In 1982, she competed at the World Diving Championships held in Ecuador that year.

In October 2001, by that time a school teacher, Kiefer was one of seven people enshrined in the McGill Sports Hall of Fame, making her just the fifth woman to be inducted.

== Early life ==
At the age of two, Kiefer started gymnastics and took up diving at the age of seven. In her spare time, she would also play in her high school's basketball and badminton teams, like her father, a basketball and badminton teacher who also acted as her diving coach. Despite a busy schedule, Kiefer commented that diving had been good for her, being able to travel a lot and see the world. At the age of seven, Kiefer made the big decision to choose diving over gymnastics, commenting that "at the time I didn't really know what the future might hold for me". Her father, who also was coaching her in gymnastics, considered there was too high a risk of injury at the competitive level she had then reached. In 1969, she was chosen by the North Shore News and Civilian Club as the North Shore Female Athlete of the Year and in January 1971, won the Roscoe LaBosier Trophy in the under-10 girls age group. Eniko and her older sister Gyogyi were each coached by their father at the West End club from around 1972.

== Career ==
In 1974 during the Canadian National and Junior Diving Championships, Kiefer's performances were described as being among the most prominent, winning the 1-metre and 3-metre events in her respective categories in what was considered "the most outstanding showing". She outperformed Cindy Shatto, who had achieved a gold medal in the 1974 British Commonwealth Games, by just under 1 point. Anthony Fouriezos, who was president of the Quebec Amateur Diving Federation, suggested that she should definitely be in consideration for the national team. She also finished as runner-up in the women's 3-metre springboard event at the 1974 Los Angeles Invitational diving championship, losing out to Cynthia Potter by a points total of 415.40 to 460.25. During May 1975 at the National Junior Olympic Diving Championships, Kiefer won four gold medals and was described as being "undoubtedly the strongest female diver to test a board since Beverly Boys, with unanimous consensus among coaches that she could become "the best in the world". She became the first 14-year-old in the history of Canada to break the 400-point mark a single 10-dive event, managing to attain 403.60 points on the 1-metre board and becoming only the second Canadian diver to break the 400 point barrier in an age class competition after Cindy Shatto. At this time, despite being several years off her peak, Kiefer was already ranked third nationally behind Bev Boys and Cindy Shatto. Despite winning the women's 1-metre springboard event at the 1975 Canadian National Summer Diving Championships, she could only manage a 6th place finish in both the 3-metre and high tower events, thus failing to qualify for a place on the 1975 Pan American Games.

Through the early 1970s, she did not lose a single age-group meet until a 3rd place finish at the Winnipeg Canadian Nationals, which she was disappointed with and by her own admission "is not what I had expected". Despite this, during the 1976 Olympic 3-metre springboard trials, she secured a 2nd place finish to qualify as a member of the Canadian Olympic team. When asked prior to the Olympics what she felt the greatest moment of her career was to date, she believed this was her Olympic trial performance, coming through with the best performance of her life on the springboard and also mentioned the 1971 World Age Group Championships as "another great thrill". She was proud of the fact that at that time, she had not lost an age group competition within the preceding four to five years. With the 1976 Olympics taking place in Montreal, she did not need to travel abroad to participate and noted this took some pressure off her. At the Olympics, she competed in the women's 3 metre springboard event.

In 1977, she was training in just three or four diving sessions each week, whereas international-class divers would typically train every day. Her goals at that time were to compete in the 1980 Summer Olympics and maybe also reach the 1984 Summer Olympics, having at that time been considered "a definite medal contender in the near future". Kiefer did ultimately qualify for the Canada's 1980 Olympic team, but was not able to compete when Canada boycotted the event in protest of the Soviet invasion of Afghanistan. In March 1982, by then described as a "spring board champion", she finished second in the Canadian Diving Championships 3-metre event with a score of 497.04 and subsequently qualified for the 1982 World Diving Championships held in Ecuador in August that year.

== Later life ==
In October 2001, Kiefer was one of seven people enshrined in the McGill Sports Hall of Fame, making her just the fifth woman to be inducted. By this time, Kiefer was a school teacher.

== Personal ==
Her father, Dezso Kiefer, was originally from Hungary and was her diving coach, as well as sharing national coaching duties with national diving coach Don Webb. Her sister, Gyorgyi, was two years her senior. As a competitive athlete, Kiefer measured 155 centimetres (61 in) in height and weighed 55 kilograms (121 lb).
