= Cougle =

Cougle is a surname. Notable people with the surname include:

- Barry Cougle (born 1938), Australian rules footballer
- Jesse Cougle (born 1975), American psychologist and professor
