= Kathleen Rollo =

Canadian diver (born 1951)

Kathleen Seaman
Personal information
- Birth name: Kathleen Rollo
- Nationality: Canadian
- Born: 30 October 1951 (age 73); Warroad, Minnesota, United States

Sport
- Sport: Diving
- Coached by: Ross Hetherington

Kathy Seaman (née Rollo, born 30 October 1951) is a Canadian former diver and diving judge. Under coach Ross Hetherington, she overcame limited training resources to earn provincial and national titles, and competed in international events including the women's 10 metre platform event at the 1972 Summer Olympics, finishing ninth. During her career, she earned numerous provincial and national awards and narrowly missed several international top-three finishes.

After retiring from competition, she contributed to the sport as a coach and international judge, while advocating for better training infrastructure in Saskatchewan. She judged at several Olympic Games and was recognized nationally for her service to Canadian diving.

Alongside her diving, she trained as a nurse, later focusing on AIDS education and prevention.

== Early life ==
Her family moved to Saskatoon when she was 3 years old. Rollo's interest in diving began in 1963, after showing an interest in diving somersaults and through friends who were involved in the sport. In 1964, while diving at the Varsity Pool with university students, she caught the attention of coach Ross Hetherington. He invited her to join his diving team in Saskatoon, where she was one of only two female divers at the time, alongside Kathy McDonald.

While in grades 9 and 10, she attended the Little Flower Academy school in Vancouver to be closer to her coach Ross Hethertington, after he moved to the area. By grade 12, she was attending Aden Bowman Collegiate.

== Sports career ==
=== Diving ===
In 1966, she placed third on the springboard event at the British Empire Games trials and bettered that in the Pan American Games trials by securing second place. She narrowly missed a medal at the 1967 Pan American Games in Winnipeg, finishing fourth in the 3-metre diving event. Following McDonald's departure, Rollo became the Saskatchewan provincial women’s diving champion from 1966 to 1969 and won the Alberta women’s diving championship in 1968 in Calgary. During trials for the 1968 Summer Olympics, she finished third and was named as an alternate.

By age 18, Rollo had already been diving competitively for six years, training under Hetherington with the Y-Optimist Diving Club. She was described in 1969 as among the top two or three women divers in Canada and was considered at that time to have a very high chance of securing a position on the Olympic team. Despite limited local facilities, she competed in both springboard and tower events, traveling to Edmonton or Winnipeg for adequate training, despite incurring travel and lodgings costs. She won a silver medal in the 1969 Canada Summer Games tower event, narrowly missing out on gold by 2.85 points to Nancy Robertson. She also lost out on a bronze medal in the 1970 Commonwealth Games by a third of a point, having been in third place until the final dive and ultimately losing the position to English competitor Shelagh Burrow. Between 1969 and 1972, she was the national university champion in the 3-metre and 10-metre diving events respectively.

Rollo set the 1972 Summer Olympics at her final goal, having expressed a desire to take up coaching after the event. At the Olympics, she competed in the 10-metre tower event, finishing ninth.

=== Coaching and advocacy ===
From 1973, she was the head coach at the Regina Diving Club, a role she held until 1976. Her international coaching work included a 1974 trip to China, where she led a Canadian diving and swimming team. Reflecting on the experience, she noted the Chinese athletes’ strong physical conditioning but felt they lacked technical refinement due to limited coaching. In 1975, she publicly advocated for better coaching and facilities for divers in Saskatchewan, warning that the province risked having no coaching for the older divers and only inexperienced coaches, but experienced divers, for the younger divers.

=== Judging and recognition ===
She served as an international judge at the 1984 Summer Olympics in the men's 3-metre event, and again at the 1988 Summer Olympics in Seoul, South Korea in the men's 10-metre event. In October 1988, she was among three people honored at the "Sask Sport's 12th annual volunteer awards", as one of Canada's top diving officials. In March 1996, she was again chosen to be a judge at the 1996 Summer Olympics in Atlanta, Georgia, her third time judging at an Olympics event.

She was recognised for her achievements in 2005, receiving the Kitch MacPherson Sports Officials Award in recognition of her contributions to the development of international diving judging, having judged five Olympic, four Commonwealth and three Pan-American games.

== Career in health services ==
Parallel to diving, she also pursued a career in health. She began studying nursing in 1970 and by 1988, was a senior consultant with the Public Service Commission. That year, she was appointed as an education and prevention co-ordinator for AIDS, tasked with raising awareness and implementing prevention programs. By 1992, she was serving as a health consultant.

== Personal ==
In the early 1970s, she moved to Regina and married Head of mission Donald Seaman and had two daughters. Her husband died in 1996.
