= Cranham (surname) =

Cranham is a surname. Notable people with the surname include:

- Kenneth Cranham (born 1944), Scottish actor
- Scott Cranham (born 1954), Canadian diver

== See also ==
- Cranham
