= Commonwealth Sport Canada =

- Abbreviation: CSC
- Headquarters: Ottawa, Ontario, Canada
- Location: Canada
- President: Rick Powers
- Website: Official Website

Commonwealth Sport Canada (CSC) (French: Jeux du Commonwealth Canada), formerly Commonwealth Games Canada (CGC), is the Commonwealth Games Association of Canada responsible for Commonwealth Games and the Commonwealth Sports movement in Canada.

== History ==
After conclusion of the 1930 British Empire Games, the Amateur Athletic Union of Canada established a permanent committee known as the British Empire Games Association of Canada. The association oversaw selection of athletes for the games, with Edward Wentworth Beatty as chairman, and Melville Marks Robinson as secretary. By 1937, J. Howard Crocker was the president and secretary of the association.

== Board of directors ==
Board of directors are elected for a quadrennial term.

Name	Designation
Richard Powers	President
Andrew Pipe	Past President
Keith Gillam	Treasurer
Claire Carver-Dias	Director
Marty Deacon	Director
Karen Hacker	Director
Simon Farbrother	Director
Graham Smith	Director
Nicole Forrester	Athletes Commission, Commonwealth Games Federation (CGF)
Andrew Pipe	President, Commonwealth Games Foundation of Canada
Bruce Robertson	Vice President, CGF
Linda Cuthbert	Sport Committee, CGF

== New Brand ==
On 10 March 2020, during Commonwealth Day, the association launched its new brand. In addition to the new name, CSC has also introduced its new CSC logo which links to the new CGF brand by incorporating the three "Victory Marks".

== Commonwealth Games Foundation of Canada ==
The Commonwealth Games Foundation of Canada (CGFC) is a body within CSC, established in 1982 with an aim to raise the funds required to send the Canadian delegation—athletes and officials—to the Commonwealth Games. Former president of the Hudson's Bay Company George Heller is the incumbent president of the CGFC, who was also the president and CEO of the 1994 Commonwealth Games Organising Committee.

== See also ==
- Canada at the Commonwealth Games
- Canadian Olympic Committee
