= Jennifer McArton =

Canadian diver (born 1968)

Personal information
- Born: 2 February 1968 (age 58) Canada
- Spouse: Jeffrey Wright (after 1997)

Sport
- Sport: Diving
- Coached by: Don Webb; Jim Lambie
Medal record
Women's diving
Representing Canada
Commonwealth Games
Silver medal – second place	1982 Brisbane	10 metre highboard

Jennifer McArton (born 2 February 1968) is a former Canadian diver. During the 1982 Commonwealth Games in Brisbane, she won a silver medal in the women's 10 metre highboard event.

Before becoming a diver, McArton trained in swimming before choosing diving. She spent her early career being coached by Don Webb and later moved to Winnipeg with his nephew Jim Lambie, also a diving coach, where she later participated in the commonwealth games and won numerous medals in various national age-group championships.

Her mother trained as a musician and her father was an engineer. In later life, McArton became a high school teacher and mother to two boys.

== Early life ==
Jennifer Lynn McArton was born on 2 February 1968 at the Ottawa Civic Hospital to parents Elizabeth and Ron and grew up in Don Mills, Toronto. Before taking up diving, McArton was initially a swimmer from the age of six, like her older sister Cheryl. She also enjoyed diving, but due to continually conflicting events between the two sports, had to choose one over the other. At a young age, she was a member of the Pointe Clare Swimming and Diving club and trained under the coaching of Don Webb.

== Career ==
=== Early diving ===
In her early diving career, she worked in bingo parlors to help raise funds for her diving club, Pan-Am Divers. She also trained with the Markham Diving Club and had to practice while moving around various different pools. She was then coached by Jim Lambie, a volunteer coach and nephew of Don Webb, on the 1-metre, 3-metre and 10-metre diving boards in the ages groups from under 10 up to age 14. In the national age-group diving championships held in Toronto during May 1981, she won triple gold medals in her age group in the 10-metre tower, beating her own record set the year previously, as well as winning gold in the 1-metre and 3-metre events. At the age of 13, McArton was the youngest ever diver to join Canada's national senior diving team.

=== Move to Winnipeg ===
Around 1982, she moved to Winnipeg to help further develop her diving career, as it was difficult to find sufficiently available time in the pool when in Toronto. She received $400 in monthly expenses as she was recognised as a certified diver. McArton lived close to the Pan-Am pool which had been built for the 1967 Pan American Games and her coach Jim Lambie supported the idea of her moving to Winnipeg. Shortly after moving, McArton was a finalist in the open 10-metre event in Ecuador, before securing a silver medal at the 1982 Commonwealth Games in the 10-metre highboard. She trained with a more sophisticated set of dives after the commonwealth games, which earned her a sixth place finish in 1983 during the FINA Diving World Cup championships held in The Woodlands, Texas. She became the youngest diver that had ever represented Canada at a world championship diving event. Her second silver medal was won in the girls 1-metre event at Hamilton, New Zealand during the 1983 world age-group championships.

During a women's high tower international diving competition in February 1984, McArton finished runner-up to then world champion Wendy Wyland, gaining 389.91 points to Wyland's 412.98. In March 1984, McArton was honored as the Jaycees Junior Athlete of the Year following what was described as a "brilliant season", having been selected out of 12 athletes. McArton won 3 gold medals in the 15-17 age group category during the annual national diving championships held in Edmonton during May 1984. She was named as the top female diver during the Senior National Championships and was nominated for Manitoba's "Female Athlete of the Year". During a practice dive in May 1985 in preparation for that year's national age group championships, she hit her right hand on her head and realised she had injured herself upon leaving the water. An x-ray confirmed a broken thumb which kept her out of the championships, while she was unable to dive for several weeks.

=== Commonwealth 1986 and later ===
McArton participated in the 1986 Commonwealth Games, finishing 5th in the 10-metre platform event with a score of 389.46. Following a third placed finish on the 10-metre tower event during the 1987 national diving championships in March, McArton took a break during the summer and had aspirations in qualifying for the 1988 Summer Olympics team, but ultimately did not make it.

McArton signed up for a psychology course during the summer of 1988, but changed to a religion course upon reading poor reviews on the quality of teaching, noting that she trusted the experiences of former students.

== Later life ==
McArton became a high school teacher towards the end of the 1990s and was known to coach many sports while working as a teacher. She maintained a passion for swimming as well as interests in golf and canoe tripping. She married Jeffrey Wright in August 1997 and gave birth to two boys.

== Personal ==
McArton attended Grant Park High School where her principal in 1984 described her as being a very responsible student who was working at "a high academic standard and is involved in other school activities", such as cross country running. Jennifer was the second of four children.

Her mother Elizabeth (nee McColl) trained as a musician, graduating at the University of Toronto with an honors in languages, later travelling to Germany and France to study literature. In 1963, she married Ronald McArton, an engineer and later pricing manager for IBM. Ron died in May 2020 and was survived by McArton's mother Elizabeth and her four children, two girls and two boys.
