= Richard Rydze =

American diver (1950–2023)

Personal information
- Full name: Richard Anthony Rydze
- Born: March 15, 1950 Pittsburgh, Pennsylvania, U.S.
- Died: November 28, 2023 (aged 73) Pittsburgh, Pennsylvania, U.S.
Medal record
Men's diving
Representing the United States
Olympic Games
Silver medal – second place	1972 Munich	10 m platform
Pan American Games
Silver medal – second place	1971 Cali	10 m platform

Richard Anthony Rydze (March 15, 1950 – November 28, 2023) was an American diver who competed in the 1972 Summer Olympics. Rydze was born in Pittsburgh, Pennsylvania. He competed in diving at the University of Michigan and won an Olympic silver medal while obtaining his MD at the University of Pittsburgh School of Medicine. He also served as one of the team doctors for the Pittsburgh Steelers from 1985 until June 2007.

== Arrest ==
Rydze was charged in a 185-count indictment with conspiracy to illegally distribute steroids, human growth hormone and painkillers including oxycodone on October 17, 2012 and appeared in U.S. Court in Pittsburgh on October 19, 2012. In March 2018, he was sentenced to ten years in prison. In the summer of 2021, Rydze was released from prison during the Covid-19 pandemic due to staffing concerns.

== Death ==
Rydze died in Pittsburgh on November 28, 2023, at the age of 73.
