= Tim Moore (diver) =

American diver

Personal information
- Born: September 17, 1953 (age 72) Columbus, Ohio, United States

Sport
- Sport: Diving
Medal record
Representing the United States
Pan American Games
Gold medal – first place	1975 Mexico City	3 metre springboard
Silver medal – second place	1975 Mexico City	10m platform

Patrick Timothy Moore (born September 17, 1953) is an American former diver. Moore competed in the 1976 Summer Olympics, where he placed 5th in the men's 10 metre platform. At the 1975 Pan American Games he won a gold medal in 3m springboard and a silver medal in 10m platform.
