= Roar Løken =

Norwegian diver

Personal information
- Full name: Håkon Roar Løken
- Nationality: Norwegian
- Born: 3 August 1945 (age 80) Sandefjord, Norway
- Height: 1.69 m (5 ft 7 in)

Sport
- Country: Norway
- Sport: Diving
- Event: Men's 3 metre springboard

Håkon Roar Løken (born 3 August 1945) is a Norwegian diver. He was born in Sandefjord.

He competed at the 1972 Summer Olympics in Munich, where he placed 10th in the men's 3 metre springboard.
