= Craig Lincoln =

American diver (born 1950)

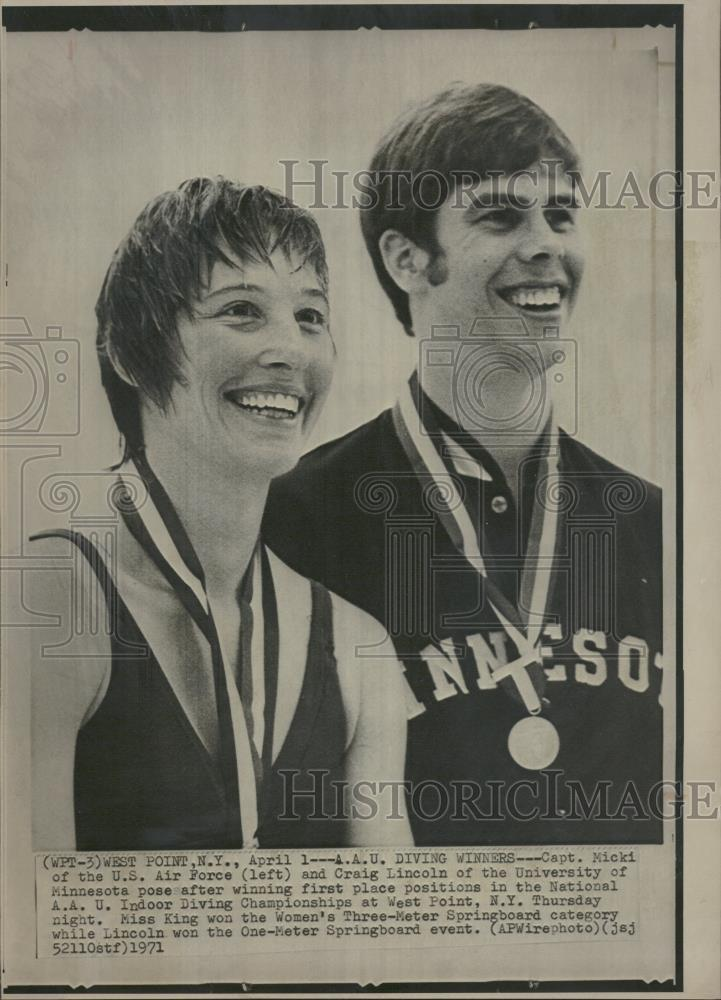
- Craig Lincoln (right) in 1971

Personal information
- Full name: Craig Howard Lincoln
- Born: October 7, 1950 (age 75) Minneapolis, Minnesota, U.S.
Medal record
Men's diving
Representing the United States
Olympic Games
Bronze medal – third place	1972 Munich	3 m springboard
Pan American Games
Silver medal – second place	1971 Cali	3 m springboard

Craig Howard Lincoln (born October 7, 1950) is an American former diver who competed in the 1972 Summer Olympics, where he won the bronze medal.
