= Diving at the 1975 Pan American Games =

This page shows the results of the Diving Competition for men and women at the 1975 Pan American Games, held from October 12 to October 26, 1975 in Mexico City, Mexico. There were two events, for both men and women.

== Medal table ==
Place	Nation	Gold medal	Silver medal	Bronze medal	Total
1	United States	2	3	2	7
2	Canada	1	1	1	3
3	Mexico	1	0	1	2
Total		4	4	4	12

== Medalists ==
=== Men ===
Event	Gold	Silver	Bronze
3m springboard	Tim Moore; United States	Phil Boggs; United States	Carlos Girón; Mexico
10m platform	Carlos Girón; Mexico	Tim Moore; United States	Kent Vosler; United States

=== Women ===
Event	Gold	Silver	Bronze
3m springboard	Jennifer Chandler; United States	Elizabeth Carruthers; Canada	Cynthia McIngvale; United States
10m platform	Janet Nutter; Canada	Janet Ely; United States	Linda Cuthbert; Canada

== See also ==
- Diving at the 1976 Summer Olympics
