= Yoshino Nishide =

Japanese diver

Personal information
- Nationality: Japanese
- Born: 12 July 1955 (age 69)

Sport
- Sport: Diving

Yoshino Nishide (西出好範, Nishide Yoshino, born 12 July 1955) is a Japanese diver. He competed in the men's 10 metre platform event at the 1976 Summer Olympics.
