= Linda Cuthbert =

Canadian diver (born 1956)

Personal information
- Nationality: Canadian
- Born: May 20, 1956
- Height: 5 ft 2 in (1.57 m)
- Weight: 104 lb (47 kg)

Sport
- Sport: Diving
- Coached by: Don Webb; Jim Lambie
Medal record
Women's diving
Representing Canada
Pan American Games
Bronze medal – third place	1975 Mexico City	10 m platform
Bronze medal – third place	1979 San Juan	10 m platform
Commonwealth Games
Gold medal – first place	1978 Edmonton	10 m highboard

Linda Cuthbert (born May 20, 1956) is a Canadian former diver and present sports director of Commonwealth Sport Canada since 2006, having also served as a technical official for several commonwealth games. During her diving career, Cuthbert won a bronze medal in each of the 1975 and 1979 Pan American Games platform diving events, as well as a gold medal in the 1978 Commonwealth Games 10 metre highboard event. Cuthbert began diving at age 10 and started to take it seriously in 1967, when she had a series of different coaches until settling with Don Webb, who became her permanent coach.

Her competitive career began in 14, when she moved away from her family to focus on training with her coach and first made the national team in 1971. She finished fourth at the 1974 British Commonwealth Games diving event, just missing out on bronze. During her employment with a bank, she would be permitted time off to train and would receive $600 annual training expenses from the Canadian Olympic Committee. She was one of four Canadian athletes who featured in the National Film Board of Canada 1979 documentary Going the Distance.

In 1980, she vocally opposed proposed boycotts of the 1980 Summer Olympics in relation to the Soviet invasion in Afghanistan, instead suggesting that athletes should turn their back on the soviet flag and not attend opening ceremonies in protest. She was involved in a diving accident in May 1980, when upon performing a somersault, lost her balance and hit her head on the springboard, falling unconscious into the pool. Although only suffering with a deep gash to the head and concussion, she missed out on making the Canadian 1980 Summer Olympics team. Just several months later in September 1980, Cuthbert announced her retirement from competitive diving, citing a loss of motivation and the continual problems of finding training facilities.

In 2003, Cuthbert established her company Breakthrough Performance and had previously been a managing consultant with the Canadian Olympic Centre. She has served on the board of directors of various Canadian sport and aquatic institutions and as of 2021, she chairs the Sport Committee of Commonwealth Sport Canada.

== Early years ==
Born on May 20, 1956, Cuthbert began entering diving competitions at the age of 10 when living in Vancouver after the family relocated there from Toronto. In 1967, the family moved to Beaconsfield, Quebec and she then started to become serious about diving and joined the Pointe Claire Diving Club. She had various coaches for a period of time until Don Webb moved there from Toronto and became her permanent, trusted coach.

== Diving career ==
Her career began at the age of 14, when she moved away from her family home to train with her national coach Don Webb in Winnipeg, making her first national team in 1971. When she was 14, she secured fifth in the American National Championships. During the Amateur Athletic Union Indoor Platform Diving Championships in 1973, she finished second with a score of 321.30.

She and Cindy Shatto lived with Webb and would move around with him in search of top diving facilities, which necessitated needing to join new schools, make new friends and make life adjustments each time. Although she passed her grade 13 exams, she did not do as well as she liked as she believed the constant changing of schools was disruptive to her education. She also expressed how traveling around would upset her and made her sick more than usually expected, while she also felt lacking in confidence and considered herself as her "own worst enemy", suggesting that she didn't have the experience or consistency as other competitors like Beverley Boys. The first time she traveled abroad, to the Soviet Union and Germany, she would be overcome with fear and during a trial practice, belly flopped from the high tower resulting in a temporary loss of sight, breathlessness and bruising, requiring a hospital visit and subsequent bed rest.

She participated in the 1974 British Commonwealth Games, narrowly missing out on a bronze medal in the 10-metre tower event, scoring 334.71 compared to Australian Madeleine Barnett, who finished 3rd with 339.30. On missing out on the bronze, she recalled how mad she was at the time and the desire to be better, describing how she "blew a reverse one and a half. Don't do that dive any more". That same year, she won second place at the World Junior Championships In 1975, she was employed by a bank, who would provide her with additional help, allowing her time off work to undertake her intensive training. She would receive an annual training expenses grant worth $600 from the Canadian Olympic Committee

She won a bronze medal in each of the 1975 and 1979 Pan American Games, as well as a gold medal in the 1978 Commonwealth Games in Edmonton. During her dive in the 1975 games, she broke a strap in her swimsuit, which slipped to her waist and was captured by an underwater camera which broadcast the moment on Mexican national television. In 1977, she was a student at George Brown College and in 1979, was one of four Canadian athletes selected by director Paul Cowan to appear in the National Film Board of Canada documentary Going the Distance, about the 1978 Commonwealth Games in Edmonton. By that time, she was being coached by Jim Lambie, who would use swearing and insults towards his divers in an attempt to encourage them to produce brilliance.

She first made the news in 1980 when voicing opposition in Canada's decision to boycott the 1980 Summer Olympics in Moscow, saying the only people it would hurt would be the athletes. On her opinion whether countries should have taken action against the Soviet invasion in Afghanistan, she suggested that boycotting was not the answer, instead believing that not attending opening ceremonies and athletes turning their back on the Soviet flag when one of their athletes won would be more effective.

=== Diving accident ===
In May 1980, Cuthbert lost her balance during a somersault and hit her head on the springboard, falling unconscious into the pool. The dive she performed was a reverse 2.5 somersault, one she was familiar and experienced with, yet despite plenty of height, did not manage to get far enough out from the board. On her descent, she hit her head against the 3-metre diving board, falling unconsciously into the water. She was retrieved from the water by judge Frank Groff and coach Don Webb, who jump in fully clothed to retrieve her. Cuthbert was rushed to hospital while still out cold. Doctors feared she may have suffered cracked vertebrae, but tests taken at Toronto General Hospital showed this was not the case, instead just being concussion. Speaking after coming around, Cuthbert said "I don't remember too much, but it's finally beginning to hit me." As a result, she missed out on making the Canadian 1980 Summer Olympics team. At the time of the accident, Cuthbert was in second place in the Olympic trials and almost a certainty to secure a place on the Olympic team in both the 3 metre and 10 metre events. She had trained for 10 years to make the Olympic team. She suffered with a deep gash to the head and concussion.

After leaving hospital and recovering, she climbed back onto the diving board in June 1980, although was not in a rush to perform the same dive that put her in hospital on 17 May.

=== Retirement ===
In September 1980, Cuthbert announced her retirement from competitive diving, citing a loss of motivation to train and the continual problems of finding training facilities. Despite her decision to retire coming just several months after her accident, she expressed the two were unrelated and made her decision while on a tour of China, Hong-Kong and Japan.

== Later life ==
In 2002, Cuthbert was known to be president of the Canadian Amateur Diving Association. The following year in 2003, she established her company Breakthrough Performance. Prior to that, she was a managing consultant with the Canadian Olympic Centre and had previously held various roles including in marketing and broadcasting.

Between 2003 and 2007, Cuthbert was the president of the Aquatic Federation of Canada and expressed her devastation in January 2005 at the decision to remove the 2005 world aquatic championships from Montreal due to financial concerns. Cuthbert feared it could set sport in Canada back by several years and questioned the country's commitment to sport, noting that federations looking to host events in the subsequent decade may not have confidence that Canada would be capable of hosting. From 2006, Cuthbert sat on the Board of Directors at the Commonwealth Sport Canada, serving as its vice president and chairs the External Representation Committee, which has a responsibility towards strategy and guideline development for effectively representing the organization to outside entities. She was also a technical official for several commonwealth games events, including the 2006 Commonwealth Games at Melbourne and 2002 Commonwealth Games in Manchester. Having dedicated most of her life to sport, she felt a duty to give back, particularly as the Commonwealth Games played a significant part during her diving career and the satisfaction in seeing young athletes achieve success. As of 2021, she chairs the Sport Committee of Commonwealth Sport Canada.

== Personal ==
When not diving, Cuthbert worked as a dental hygienist. At the age of 18, Cuthbert measured 5 feet 2 inches (1.57 m) tall and weighed 104 pounds (47 kg) and was described as being as "pretty as a picture". As of 2021, Cuthbert lived in Toronto, Canada.
