= Diving at the 1971 Pan American Games =

This page shows the results of the Diving Competition for men and women at the 1971 Pan American Games, held from July 30 to August 13, 1971 in Cali, Colombia. There were two events, for both men and women.

== Medal table ==
Place	Nation	Gold medal	Silver medal	Bronze medal	Total
1	United States	2	3	1	6
2	Canada	2	1	1	4
3	Colombia	0	0	1	1
3	Mexico	0	0	1	1
Total		4	4	4	12

== Medalists ==
=== Men ===
Event	Gold	Silver	Bronze
3m springboard	Mike Finneran; United States	Craig Lincoln; United States	José Robinson; Mexico
10m platform	Richard Earley; United States	Richard Rydze; United States	Diego Henao; Colombia

=== Women ===
Event	Gold	Silver	Bronze
3m springboard	Elizabeth Carruthers; Canada	Micki King; United States	Beverly Boys; Canada
10m platform	Nancy Robertson; Canada	Beverly Boys; Canada	Deborah Lipman; United States

== See also ==
- Diving at the 1972 Summer Olympics
