= Ulrich Reff =

German diver

Personal information
- Nationality: German
- Born: 13 May 1943 (age 81); Heidenau, Germany

Sport
- Sport: Diving

Ulrich Reff (born 13 May 1943) is a German diver. He competed in the men's 3 metre springboard event at the 1968 Summer Olympics.
