= Going the Distance (1979 film) =

1979 film

- Directed by: Paul Cowan
- Written by: Paul Cowan
- Produced by: Jacques Bobet; Robert Verrall
- Narrated by: Michael Kane (English); Jacques Fauteux (French)
- Cinematography: Georges Dufaux; Pierre Letarte; Tony Westman; Paul Cowan
- Edited by: Paul Cowan; Steven Kellar; Jeepy Macadam; Rosemarie Shapley
- Production company: National Film Board of Canada
- Distributed by: National Film Board of Canada
- Release date: May 23, 1979
- Running time: 89 minutes
- Country: Canada
- Language: English
- Budget: $840,000

Going the Distance is a 1979 Canadian documentary film directed by Paul Cowan about the 1978 Commonwealth Games. Produced by the National Film Board of Canada, and produced by Robert Verrall and Jacques Bobet, it was nominated for an Academy Award for Best Documentary Feature.

== Summary ==
Cowan, who had been chosen for the project on the basis of his previous sports specials, shot most of the film himself, delegating second-unit segments to Reevan Dolgoy, Georges Dufaux, Beverly Shaffer, Pierre Letarte and Tony Westman. Cowan chose to focus on eight athletes from four continents, including four Canadians: Toronto boxer John Raftery, thirteen-year-old Winnipeg gymnast Monica Goermann, and divers Linda Cuthbert and Janet Nutter. Also featured was New Zealand weightlifter Precious McKenzie. Athletes were filmed prior to the Games as well as in competition at the games in Edmonton.

== Production ==
The film had a budget of $840,000 (equivalent to $3,448,200 in 2025). The film was shot in Canada, Isle of Mann, Kenya, Tanzania, New Zealand, and England from 18 November 1977 to 12 August 1978. The film was narrated by Michael Kane in English and Jacques Fauteux in French.

== Release ==
The film was shown at the Northern Alberta Jubilee Auditorium in Edmonton on 23 May 1979. Its broadcast premiere was on the CTV Television Network on August 4, 1979.

== Awards ==
- C.I.D.A.L.C. International Festival of Sports Films, Turin: First Prize, Gold Plaque, 1982
- Commonwealth Television and Film Festival, Nicosia: Best Film of the Festival, 1980
- 52nd Academy Awards, Los Angeles: Nominee: Best Documentary Feature, 1980

== Works cited ==
- Evans, Gary (1991). In the National Interest: A Chronicle of the National Film Board of Canada from 1949 to 1989. University of Toronto Press. ISBN 0802027849.
- Turner, D. John, ed. (1987). Canadian Feature Film Index: 1913-1985. Canadian Film Institute. ISBN 0660533642.
