= Judy Stewart =

Canadian diver (born 1944)

Personal information
- Full name: Judith Leona Stewart
- Born: 14 August 1944 (age 81) Toronto, Ontario, Canada
- Height: 4 ft 11 in (1.50 m)
- Weight: 98 lb (44 kg)

Sport
- Sport: Diving
- Event: Springboard diving
- Coached by: Don Webb
Medal record
| Event | 1st | 2nd | 3rd |
|---|---|---|---|
| Pan American Games | - | 1 | - |
| British Diving Championships | 1 | 1 | - |
Women's diving
Representing Canada
Pan American Games
| Silver medal – second place | 1963 São Paulo | 3 meter springboard |
British Diving Championships
| Gold medal – first place | 1965 London | Springboard |
| Silver medal – second place | 1965 London | Highboard |

Judith Leona Stewart (born 14 August 1944) is a Canadian diver. She competed in two events at the 1964 Summer Olympics. She was coached by champion diver Don Webb and won medals in the 1963 Pan American Games and the 1965 British Swimming Championships. Stewart was a former gymnast and married golfer Phil Brownlee in January 1966 and later retired from competitive diving that year.

During her career, she was described in various newspapers as being one of the best in Canada in particular by former Olympic diver Irene MacDonald, who described her as the best female Canadian competitor that she had witnessed during her own diving career.

== Career ==
=== Early career and coaching ===
Born in Toronto, Stewart was coached by Don Webb from 1961, after initially entering a diving contest "as a joke", to which she was easily victorious and encouraged Webb to offer her some advice. Stewart said during an interview that she owed everything to Webb, "If it weren't for him, I wouldn't be where I am", describing him as a "tough coach". Webb began coaching Stewart when she was 15 and part of the Police Youth Club, at a time when she also practiced gymnastics. They met when Webb was asked to be a judge in a gymnastics competition at the Scarboro club and he later demonstrated the trampoline to gymnasts including Stewart. When they first met, Webb commented that he thought "she'd do better in diving than gymnastics", commenting that when she first tried it, she was "awful at first", belly flopping at nearly every attempt and requiring Webb's assistance several times to help her out of the water. She had never dived before in her life, but Webb was a champion diver who won the world's high-diving championship in 1963. In Webb's opinion, he believed her best dive was the 1½ somersault pike.

=== Competition ===
Stewart would practice diving three night each week, including on Sunday and would be in bed no later than 10pm every night. Prior to a big event, she would train every day of the week for at least three hours at a time, traveling 10 miles (16 km) to the Leaside Aquatic Club from her home in the Toronto suburb of West Hill. Former Olympic diver Irene MacDonald announced her retirement in 1961, citing among her reasons that she thought it was time to allow other Canadian girls the opportunity to compete, and in particular Judy Stewart, who she described as "the best woman competitor in Canada that I have seen since I have been diving".

In 1963, Stewart won a silver medal at the São Paulo Pan American Games in the women's 3 meter springboard. Stewart was described in 1965 as "probably the best internationally known Canadian diver" with a quick, all-business diving style. As there were no 10 meter towers in Eastern Canada, she and Webb would have to travel over 125 miles to Picton, Ontario, where she would dive into a canal off an old windmill, although Stewart noted that it "was only about 8.5 or 9 meters". Her first experience diving from 10 meters was in Vancouver. During the 1965 British Swimming Championships, she won a gold medal in the springboard event with a points total of 131.133 and a silver medal in the high-board.

=== Retirement ===
During the summer of 1965, she had expressed an interest in participating in the 1968 Summer Olympics with an intention of retiring after this event. At that time, she had won the 1-metre diving event for four consecutive years and had won the 3-metre event for the previous three years. Stewart, then known as Judy Brownlee, ultimately announced her retirement from competition in July 1966. At that time, she was described in 1966 as "the best in Canada" when she held 1, 3 and 10-meter diving titles.

== Personal ==
During her career, Stewart measured 4 feet 11 inches (1.50 m) in height and weighed around 98 pounds (44 kg). When not diving, she worked for a Toronto fuel firm as a typist, although by August 1963, had already taken three months away from her work to participate in diving competitions around the world. When not diving, she was also a bookkeeper and formerly a gymnast, before giving it up to concentrate on diving. She was married to professional golfer Phil Brownlee in January 1966.
