= Kathy Kelemen =

Canadian diver (born 1966)

Personal information
- Full name: Katherine Kelemen
- Nationality: Canadian
- Born: 27 June 1966 (age 60) Bratislava, Czechoslovakia

Sport
- Sport: Diving
Medal record
Women's diving
Representing Canada
Commonwealth Games
Bronze medal – third place	1982 Brisbane	10 m platform
Bronze medal – third place	1986 Edinburgh	3 m springboard

Katherine "Kathy" Kelemen (born 27 June 1966) is a Canadian diver. She competed in the women's 10 metre platform event at the 1984 Summer Olympics and won bronze medals in each of the 1982 and 1986 Commonwealth Games.

== Career ==
In November 1980, Kelemen was living in Richmond, British Columbia and by that time was being considered as among the province's top divers, having been victorious in her age category as well as the women's open events. Her highest score recorded was 397.25 in the 3-metre dives, which was comparable to the Olympic standard of 400 points. During the 1981 Canada Games, Kelemen won various events including the 1 and 3 metre springboard event. Former diver Irene MacDonald believed in 1981 that "she'll be world class, she really will be", describing her as a "coach's dream" due to her serious nature in wanting to train and undertake the difficult dives. In 1983, she was a member of the University of Calgary diving club and won three events at the invitational competition for the Pan American Games in Winnipeg, taking 1st place in three springboard dives which included two 1-metre and a 3-metre dive. In March 1985, she won the women's 10 metre platform dive event at the senior Winter National Diving Championships with a score of 531.96.

== Personal ==
Kelemen was born in Czechoslovakia and has lived in Australia and Ontario, Canada.
