= Reinhard von Bauer =

German diver

Personal information
- Nationality: German
- Born: 23 February 1945 (age 80); Bernau bei Berlin, Germany

Sport
- Sport: Diving

Reinhard von Bauer (born 23 February 1945) is a German diver. He competed in the men's 3 metre springboard event at the 1972 Summer Olympics.
