= David Bush (diver) =

American diver

Personal information
- Nationality: American
- Born: January 11, 1951 (age 75) Orange, New Jersey, United States

Sport
- Sport: Diving

David Bush (born January 11, 1951) is an American diver. He competed in the men's 3 metre springboard event at the 1972 Summer Olympics.

His sister, Lesley Bush, represented the U.S. in diving at the 1964 Summer Olympics.
