= Wolfram Ristau =

German diver

Personal information
- Nationality: German
- Born: 26 October 1953 (age 71); Jüterbog, East Germany

Sport
- Sport: Diving

Wolfram Ristau (born 26 October 1953) is a German diver. He competed in the men's 10 metre platform event at the 1972 Summer Olympics.
