= Alan Roberts (diver) =

British diver

Personal information
- Nationality: British (English/Welsh)
- Born: c.1938 Birmingham, England

Sport
- Sport: Diving
- Event: Springboard
- Club: Ferndale DC; Highgate DC

Alan Roberts (born c.1938) is an English-born former diver, who competed for Wales at the 1958 British Empire and Commonwealth Games (now Commonwealth Games).

== Biography ==
Roberts was born in Birmingham, England, but qualified to represent Wales through his Welsh parents who lived in Tylorstown. He was a member of the Highgate Diving Club.

He won the 1957 Welsh title but was unable to defend his title in 1958 due to being in London for work. He had moved to London from Tylorstown in order to join the Highgate diving club.

He represented the 1958 Welsh team at the 1958 British Empire and Commonwealth Games in Cardiff, Wales, where he participated in the 3 metres springboard event.

He represented the Great Britain diving team and attended events, including a competition against Italy in 1964 and the 1965 European Cup in Austria. He was the 1969 British 3 metres springboard champion.
