= Cindy Shatto =

Canadian diver (1957–2011)

- Shatto pictured by the Calgary Herald, September 1975

Personal information
- Full name: Cynthia Shatto
- Born: June 19, 1957 Toronto, Ontario, Canada
- Died: October 3, 2011 (aged 54) Miramar, Florida, United States
- Height: 5 ft 7 in (1.70 m)
- Weight: 126 lb (57 kg)
- Spouse: William Weingartner (1985–2011)

Sport
- Country: Canada
- Sport: Diving
- Event: Platform diving
- Coached by: John Dickinson; Don Webb
- Retired: June 1, 1978 (aged 20)
Medal record
Women's diving
Representing Canada
British Commonwealth Games
Gold medal – first place	1974 Christchurch	3 m springboard

Cynthia "Cindy" Shatto (June 19, 1957 – October 3, 2011) was a Canadian diver. She won a gold medal in the 1974 British Commonwealth Games 3 metre springboard event and competed in the women's 10 metre platform event at the 1976 Summer Olympics, where she finished fifth following controversy over the judges' scoring.

Shatto began competitive diving when she was 8 years old and won nearly all diving events of her age group. To further develop her skills, in 1970 she and fellow diver Linda Cuthbert moved into the family home of her coach Don Webb, where she would train for up to five hours a day, six days a week, only taking rest on Sunday. Around the age of 14, she was admitted to hospital in the early 1970s and needed her gall bladder removed due to eating too much greasy food, leaving her weak and unable to train during the winter of 1971–1972. During the mid-1970s in-between competing at the 1974 Commonwealth Games and the 1976 Olympics, she lost interest in the sport and her attitude changed when she compared her lifestyle to that of others who did not have the pressures of international competitions, but was encouraged by fellow diver Beverly Boys to reflect positively on the sport and thereafter began serious practising again from around August 1975.

Shatto retired from competitive diving in 1978 after growing tired of a nomadic lifestyle and in summer 1990 moved with her family to Binghamton, New York, where she became a diving coach at Binghamton University. She died of lung cancer in October 2011 at the age of 54.

== Career ==
=== Childhood and early development ===
Born in June 1957, Shatto began roller skating at the age of 2 and later took up acrobatics, modern dance and learnt to play the violin. She started competitive diving at the age of 8 in her family's backyard pool in Willowdale, Toronto. Her father would play diving games with her, using a long garbage sweeping pole for her to run and leap over "like a porpoise". Under the early coaching of John Dickinson, Shatto won "just about every age-group meet she entered". Among her first recognised competitions was the Ontario under-10s 1-metre diving championships, where at the age of 8 she scored 84.20 points and won in her age group. At the age of 9, she practised 33 feet (10 m) platform diving at the open-air pool in Summerville, occasionally being blown by wind from the tower due to its location near the edge of Lake Ontario. Despite the extreme cold weather conditions, she persevered. A few weeks after her ninth birthday, she became the Ontario diving champion in the girls under-10 age category with a score of 132.75 and followed it up by becoming the United States diving champion in her age group.

By the age of 10, she had experience with playing the violin, acrobatics, contemporary dancing and baton twirling. Her mother described her as persistent, saying that "if she discovered something she couldn't master, she'd get mad, sulk, but stick it out until she got better." Shortly before turning 11, as a member of the Etobicoke Diving Club, she won the under-14 tower event in the Ontario open championships, which brought her competitive record to 26 first-place finishes, two second-placed finishes and one third-place finish across 29 events. Shortly before her 12th birthday, she finished runner-up in the 1969 Ontario open 3-metre diving championships in the girls' under-15 category. At the age of 13, she was invited to train with national coach Don Webb, requiring her to live with Webb's family for around three years, the first two years being in Winnipeg.

During her earlier years, she frequently ate excessive amounts of chips and gravy, with other children using it as her nickname. Having been admitted to hospital with constant stomach pains due to excessive greasy food, her gallbladder was removed which left her weak and unable to train during the winter of 1971–1972.

=== Competitive diving ===
By 1973, she had been living with Don Webb's family for three years, training up to five hours a day, six days a week, or longer when preparing for a competition. Alongside Linda Cuthbert, another diver living with the Webbs, Shatto trained for an hour at lunchtime and had a heavier workload on Saturdays, with a rest day on Sundays. Diving was everything to Shatto at that point, and she loved the competition, traveling and meeting new people. She would show little emotion during competitions, except when winning, and did not like her father watching her diving as they would both get nervous. In the same year, she represented her country at the world championships held in Yugoslavia. Under Webb's coaching in 1974, Shatto won a gold medal in the British Commonwealth Games in Christchurch in the 3 metre springboard diving event, establishing herself as the likeliest contender in Canada to win a gold medal at the 1976 Summer Olympics. According to Webb, Shatto was a natural diver with class, possessing the style and determination that other divers had to learn.

==== Depression ====
Prior to the 1976 Olympics, Shatto went through a depressive period around 1974 and 1975, losing her motivation for competitive diving and developing a poor attitude. Her performances during this time barely reflected her talent as a top three diver in Canada. She even considered retiring from the sport to live a more traditional lifestyle, like her sister Becky, who was recognized as a "female athlete of the year" in high school. She started comparing her life to her sister's and felt envy. Shatto's father, a perfectionist, couldn't understand her change in attitude or lack of interest in diving. After reflecting on the positive aspects of diving, including international travel and the people she had met, Shatto was offered advice by fellow diver Beverly Boys, which helped her regain her motivation and confidence. She began serious practicing again around August 1975 and accepted that if she performed poorly, it would be due to lack of practice, not attitude.

==== Olympics and beyond ====
She had taken a year out of high school in 1976 to train for the Olympics full time. Shortly after turning 19, Shatto competed in the 1976 Olympics and was in second place in the women's 10 metre platform after five of eight dives, but dropped to fifth position following a sixth dive that was scored controversially. The Montreal Gazette at the time suggested that she had been "cheated out of at least a bronze," alleging bias from the Soviet and Swedish judges, although Shatto felt that finishing fifth in the world was still an accomplishment. After the Olympics, she took a six-month sabbatical, feeling "physically let down" by not winning anything in the competition, which was longer than the three-week breaks she usually took. Shatto returned to training in July 1977 to prepare for the world championships in 1978, practicing diving for four to five hours a day.

=== Retirement ===
On the eve of the 1978 Commonwealth Games, Shatto announced her retirement from competitive diving at the age of 21, citing the "nomadic life of a world-class athlete" as being the primary factor in her loss of interest. She admitted that her Olympic controversy two years prior was a contributing factor as well as losing motivation, instead preferring to get a job and earn her own money.

== Later life ==
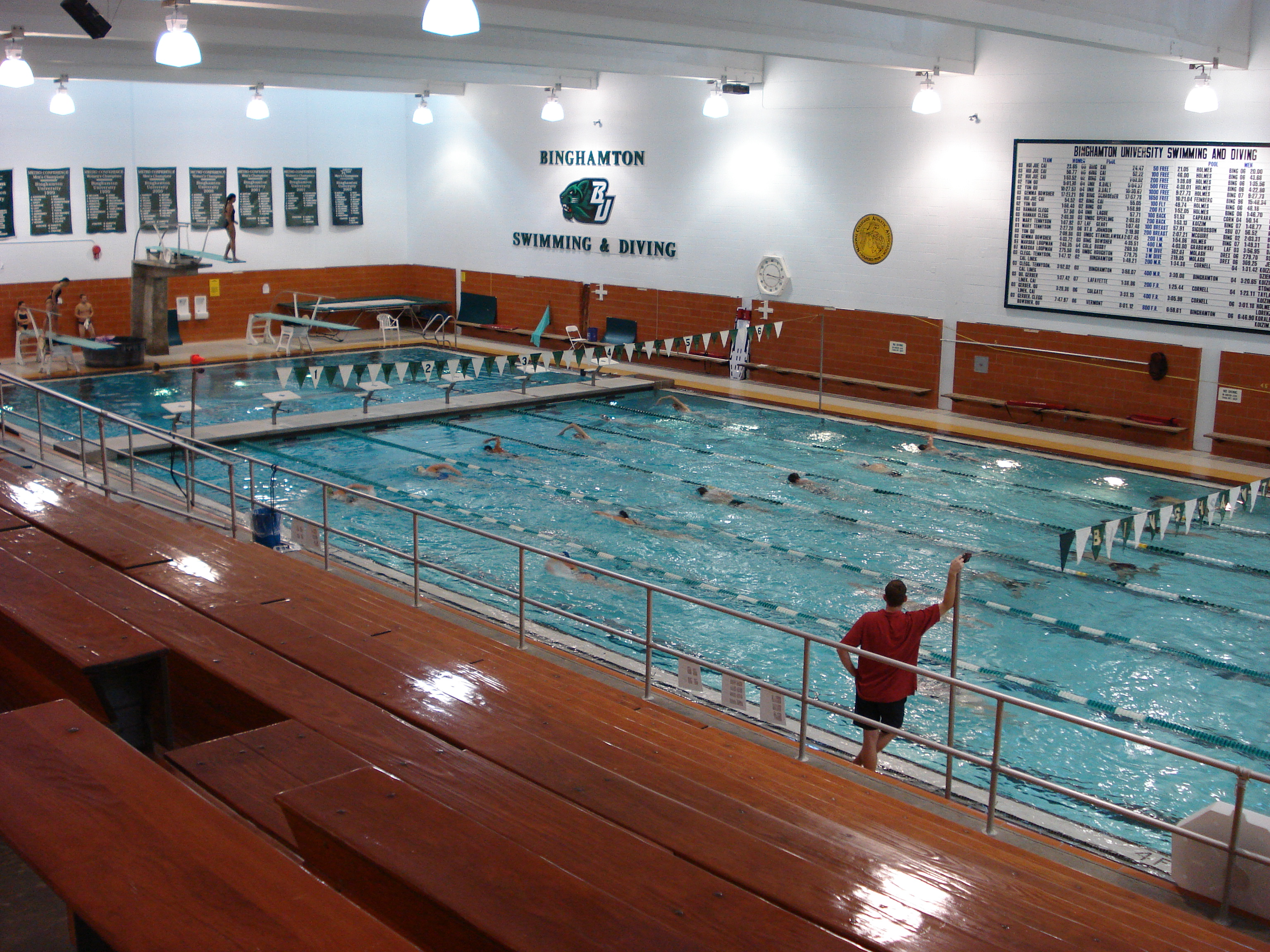
Swimming pool in Binghamton University, pictured in 2007

In later life, she was an executive secretary with Xerox around 1987 and later an assistant to the owner of Mundial International. In June 1990, she relocated with her family to Binghamton, New York where her husband grew up, having grown tired of Florida. It was the first time Shatto had lived in a small town, which she liked due to being "family-oriented". She answered an advertisement in September 1990 for a job as a diving coach and was successful at securing the role at Binghamton University, which her husband later noted had a positive effect on her. During a 1977 interview she had expressed reluctance to enter coaching, believing that she did not have the "outgoing personality" that was needed to get divers to do the dives she would want them to.

== Personal ==
Born as Cynthia Shatto in June 1957, her father, Dick Shatto, was a professional Canadian football player and member of the Canadian Football Hall of Fame. and her mother was Lynne Shatto (née Garlough). Cindy was the third of five children and attended Rideau High School. During her diving career, Shatto measured 5 feet 7 inches (1.70 m) tall and weighed around 126 pounds (57 kg).

A long-term resident of Florida, Shatto was married to William "Bill" Weingartner in February 1985, having first met in 1979 when she entered a restaurant in Tarpon Springs that Weingartner managed, in search of a job following her retirement from diving. He recalled that he "instantly fell in love", at the time unaware of her sporting achievements until their relationship developed. They had two sons born in the 1980s, Richard who also took up diving and Christopher.

She died of lung cancer in October 2011 at the age of 54, following a two-year battle.
