= Mike Finneran =

American diver (born 1948)

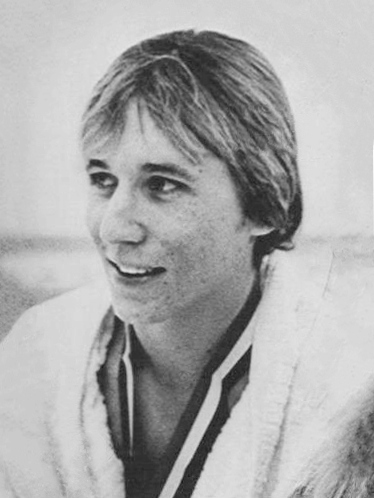
- Finneran in 1971

Personal information
- Born: September 21, 1948 (age 77) Rockville Centre, New York, U.S.
- Height: 178 cm (5 ft 10 in)
- Weight: 73 kg (161 lb)

Sport
- Sport: Diving
- Club: Ohio State Buckeyes
Medal record
Representing the United States
Pan American Games
Gold medal – first place	1971 Cali	3 m springboard

Michael Holman Finneran (born September 21, 1948) is an American former diver. In 1971 he won the NCAA outdoor and AAU indoor titles and a gold medal at the Pan American Games, all in the 3 m springboard. Next year he won the AAU outdoor springboard title. At the 1972 Summer Olympics, he placed 5th in the springboard and 9th in the 10 m platform.

== Biography ==
In 1971 Finneran graduated in business administration from the Ohio State University. He later coached both men's and women's teams at the University of South Carolina in 1981–85, and at the University of Alabama in 1985–88, and prepared the national diving team for the 1986 Goodwill Games. He later coached at Enloe High School (1997–2000) and at North Carolina State University. His sister Sharon Finneran is an Olympic swimmer, and her daughter Ariel Rittenhouse is an Olympic diver.
