= Italo Salice =

Italian diver (born 1942)

Personal information
- Nationality: Italian
- Born: 20 February 1942 (age 83); Rome, Italy

Sport
- Sport: Diving

Italo Salice (born 20 February 1942) is an Italian diver. He competed in the men's 3 metre springboard event at the 1968 Summer Olympics.
