= John Baker (diver) =

English diver

Personal information
- Nationality: British (English)
- Born: 4 January 1951 (age 75)
- Height: 180 cm (5 ft 11 in)
- Weight: 76 kg (168 lb)

Sport
- Sport: Diving
- Event: Springboard

John David Baker (born 4 January 1951) is a male former diver who competed for Great Britain at the 1972 Summer Olympics.

== Biography ==
Baker represented the England team at the 1970 British Commonwealth Games in Edinburgh, Scotland, where he participated in the 3 metre springboard event.

At the 1972 Olympic Games in Munich, Baker represented Great Britain in the men's 3 metre springboard.
