= Ricardo Velarde =

Mexican diver

Personal information
- Nationality: Mexican
- Born: 5 June 1957 (age 67)

Sport
- Sport: Diving

Ricardo Velarde (born 5 June 1957) is a Mexican diver. He competed in the men's 10 metre platform event at the 1976 Summer Olympics.
