= Joe Jones (cyclist) =

Canadian cyclist

Personal information
- Born: 30 September 1944 (age 82) Wales

Cycling career
- Sport: Cycling

Joe Jones (born 30 September 1944) is a Canadian former cyclist. He competed in the individual road race and the team time trial events at the 1968 Summer Olympics.
