= Philip Drew =

English diver

Personal information
- Nationality: British (English)
- Born: Q3. 1948 Harrow, Middlesex, England

Sport
- Sport: Diving
- Event: 10m platform
- Club: Highgate Diving Club
Medal record
Diving
Representing England
Commonwealth Games
Silver medal – second place	1970 Edinburgh	10m platform

Philip A. Drew (born 1948), is a former diver who competed for England at the Commonwealth Games.

== Biography ==
Drew represented England in the 10 metres platform, at the 1970 British Commonwealth Games in Edinburgh, Scotland, winning a silver medal.

Drew was a member of the Highgate Diving Club and also competed in the springboard event in which he was a Middlesex and Southern counties champion.
