= Beverly Williams (diver) =

British diver

Beverley Williams
Personal information
- Full name: Beverley Anne Maria Williams
- Nationality: Great Britain
- Born: 5 January 1957 (age 69)

Sport
- Sport: Diving
Medal record
Women's diving
Representing England
Commonwealth Games
Silver medal – second place	1974 Christchurch	10 m platform

Beverley Anne Maria Williams (born 5 January 1957) is a female former diver who competed for Great Britain and England. Williams represented Great Britain at the 1972 Summer Olympics.

She also represented England and won a silver medal in the 10 metres platform, at the 1974 British Commonwealth Games in Christchurch, New Zealand.
