= Frank Taubert =

German diver

Personal information
- Nationality: German
- Born: 10 March 1956 (age 69); Dresden, East Germany

Sport
- Sport: Diving

Frank Taubert (born 10 March 1956) is a German diver. He competed at the 1976 Summer Olympics and the 1980 Summer Olympics.
