= Barry Cougle =

Australian rules footballer

Personal information
- Full name: Barry Cougle
- Born: 28 May 1938
- Died: 13 April 2018 (aged 79)
- Original team: Geelong Amateurs
- Height: 185 cm (6 ft 1 in)
- Weight: 78 kg (172 lb)

Playing career^{1}
Years	Club	Games (Goals)
1958–1959	Geelong	14 (7)
- ^{1} Playing statistics correct to the end of 1959.

Barry Cougle (28 May 1938 – 13 April 2018) was an Australian rules footballer who played for the Geelong Football Club in the Victorian Football League (VFL).
