= Michael Telch =

American psychologist

- Born: Michael Joseph Telch; March 28, 1953 (age 72); Boston, Massachusetts
- Education: University of Massachusetts, Amherst (B.S., 1975); University of the Pacific (M.A., 1978); Stanford University (Ph.D., 1983)
- Awards: University of Texas Dean's Fellowship (2005), Revesz Professor at the University of Amsterdam (2010)
- Scientific career
- Fields: Clinical psychology
- Institutions: University of Texas at Austin
- Thesis: A comparison of behavioral and pharmacological approaches to the treatment of agoraphobia (1983)
- Academic advisors: William Stewart Agras
- Doctoral students: Jesse Cougle

Michael J. Telch (born March 28, 1953, in Boston, Massachusetts) is an American psychologist who has taught at the University of Texas at Austin (UT-Austin) since 1986. At UT-Austin, he is a professor of clinical psychology, the founding director of the Laboratory for the Study of Anxiety Disorders (which he founded in 1988), and the former Director of Clinical Training. He is a fellow of the Association for Psychological Science and the American Association of Applied and Preventive Psychology. He is known for his research on posttraumatic stress disorder among American soldiers, and the extent to which it can be predicted before the soldiers serve in combat.
