= Vladimir Vasin =

Soviet diver

Personal information
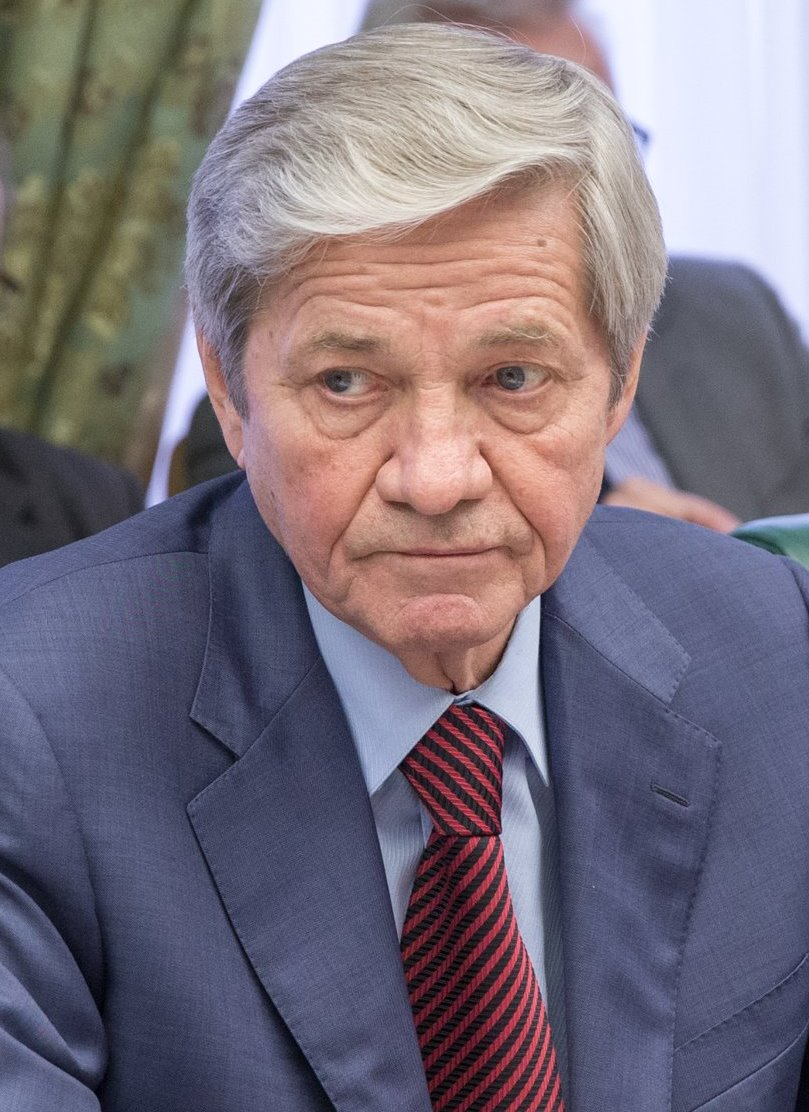

President of the All-Russian Olympic Committee
- In office December 1989 – February 1992
- Preceded by: Vyacheslav Sreznevsky
- Succeeded by: Vitali Smirnov

Personal details
- Born: 9 January 1947 (age 79) Moscow, Russian SFSR, Soviet Union
- Awards

Sport
- Sport: Diving
Medal record
Men's diving
Representing the Soviet Union
Olympic Games
Gold medal – first place	1972 Munich	3 m springboard
European Championships
Bronze medal – third place	1970 Barcelona	3 m springboard
Summer Universiade
Silver medal – second place	1973 Moscow	Springboard

Vladimir Alexeyevich Vasin (Russian: Владимир Алексеевич Васин; born 9 January 1947) is a former Russian diver and Olympic champion. He competed for the Soviet Union at the 1972 Olympic Games in Munich, where he received a gold medal in springboard.

In 1989–1991 Vasin was the chairman of the All-Russian Olympic Committee. In 1991, after the USSR collapsed, the Soviet Olympic Committee ceased to exist, and the All-Russian Olympic Committee became an independent organization and was renamed the Russian Olympic Committee. In February 1992, Vladimir Vasin resigned from his post, and Vitali Smirnov, the last chairman of the Soviet Olympic Committee, succeeded him.

== See also ==
- List of members of the International Swimming Hall of Fame
