= Helge Ziethen =

German diver

Personal information
- Born: 22 November 1952 (age 72); Rostock, East Germany

Sport
- Sport: Diving

Helge Ziethen (born 22 November 1952) is a German former diver who competed in the 1972 Summer Olympics.
