= Glen Grout =

Canadian diver (1952–2016)

Personal information
- Nationality: Canadian
- Born: 31 May 1952; Vancouver, British Columbia, Canada
- Died: 24 August 2016 (aged 64); Vancouver, British Columbia, Canada

Sport
- Sport: Diving

Glen Grout (31 May 1952 – 24 August 2016) was a Canadian diver. He competed in the men's 10 metre platform event at the 1976 Summer Olympics.

In May 1971, he won the 3-metre event in the British Columbia diving championships with a total score of 434.65.
