= Christian Telch =

German footballer

Personal information
- Date of birth: 9 January 1988 (age 38)
- Place of birth: Mainz, West Germany
- Height: 1.81 m (5 ft 11 in)
- Positions: Defensive midfielder; right-back

Youth career
- –1999: TSV Armsheim
- 1999–2007: Mainz 05

Senior career*
Years	Team	Apps	(Gls)
2007–2010	Mainz 05 II	74	(0)
2010–2012	Kickers Offenbach	22	(0)
2010–2012	Kickers Offenbach II	12	(0)
2012–2013	Rot-Weiss Essen	29	(0)
2013–2014	SVN Zweibrücken	34	(3)
2014–2015	Goslarer SC	20	(1)
2015–2017	Eintracht Trier	77	(6)
2017–2021	FC 08 Homburg	85	(4)
2021	VfR Mannheim	0	(0)
2021–2022	SV Gonsenheim	10	(1)
- * Club domestic league appearances and goals as of 18:42, 30 October 2022 (UTC)

Christian Telch (born 9 January 1988) is a German former footballer who played as a defender.
