= Richard Earley =

American diver (born 1944)

Personal information
- Full name: Richard Douglas Earley
- Born: August 3, 1944 (age 81) Redlands, California, U.S.
Medal record
Men's diving
Representing the United States
Pan American Games
| Gold medal – first place | 1971 Cali | 10 m platform |

Richard Douglas "Rick" Earley (born August 3, 1944) is an American former diver who competed in the 1972 Summer Olympics. He was born in Redlands, California. In 1991, Earley was inducted into the Fresno County Athletic Hall of Fame.
