= Andrew Gill (diver) =

British diver

Personal information
- Nationality: British (English)
- Born: 19 June 1948 (age 78)
- Height: 175 cm (5 ft 9 in)
- Weight: 80 kg (176 lb)

Sport
- Sport: Diving
- Event: 10m platform
- Club: Metropolitan Diving School
Medal record
Diving
Representing England
Commonwealth Games
| Bronze medal – third place | 1970 Edinburgh | 10m platform |

Andrew Michael Gill (born 19 June 1948), is a male former diver who competed at the 1972 Summer Olympics.

== Biography ==
While attending the Gorringe Park Secondary Modern School in 1962 he was instructed on the trampoline by his teacher Wally Clark and regarded as a promising diver.

Gill represented the England team at the 1970 British Commonwealth Games in Edinburgh, Scotland, where he participated in the 10 metres platform event, winning a bronze medal.

At the 1972 Olympic Games in Munich, Gill represented Great Britain in the men's 10 metre platform.
