= Jesse Cougle =

American psychologist

- Jesse Ray Cougle
- Born: June 30, 1975 (age 51); New Orleans, Louisiana
- Education: University of Texas at Austin
- Awards: Association for Behavioral and Cognitive Therapies' 2013 President's New Researcher Award
- Scientific career
- Fields: Psychology
- Workplaces: Florida State University
- Thesis: An examination of courageous behavior in a laboratory setting (2008)
- Doctoral advisor: Michael Telch
- Website: psy.fsu.edu/~couglelab/cougle.htm

Jesse Ray Cougle (born June 30, 1975, in New Orleans, Louisiana) is an American psychologist and professor of psychology at Florida State University. His laboratory studies multiple psychological disorders, including obsessive-compulsive disorder and posttraumatic stress disorder.

== Education and career ==
Cougle graduated from Lutheran High School in Springfield, Illinois in 1993. He went on to receive a B.A. in psychology from Azusa Pacific University in 1997, an M.Sc. from the Oxford University in 2001, and a Ph.D. from the University of Texas at Austin in 2008. He joined Florida State as an assistant professor of psychology in 2008, and became an associate professor there in 2015.
