= George Heller =

Canadian businessperson

George Heller is a Canadian businessperson. He was the president and CEO of Hudson's Bay Company from 1999 to 2006, when the company was acquired by Jerry Zucker. He continued to serve as Senior Director of the Board until late 2008.

He was President and CEO of the Victoria, British Columbia. Commonwealth Games Committee, which organized the 1994 XV Commonwealth Games. In 1995, he became President for North America and Europe of Bata Industries Ltd. He became President and CEO of Kmart's Canadian unit in 1997. In February 1998, he became President and CEO of Zellers and Executive Vice President of Hudson's Bay Company.

Heller has Honorary Doctorates from the University of Victoria and Ryerson University. He was awarded the Meritorious Service Medal from the Government of Canada for service to his country. Recently elected to the Canadian Retail Hall of Fame, Heller is also a Board Member and Chair of the Investment Committee, Asia Pacific Foundation in Vancouver. He serves on several Boards, including Gildan Activewear. In August 2014, he was presented the Governor General's Sovereign Medal. He was appointed Honorary Consul General of Thailand in 2007 and has served as Honorary Trade Advisor to the Government of Thailand since 2000. In 2013, he was awarded the Jan Masaryk Silver Medal by the Government of the Czech Republic. In September 2016, he was appointed as Commander, Most Noble Order of the Crown of Thailand by the Government of Thailand.
