= Gerhard Hölzl =

German diver

Personal information
- Born: 17 April 1952 (age 72); Regensburg, West Germany

Sport
- Country: Germany

Gerhard Hölzl (born 17 April 1952 in Regensburg) is a German former diver who competed in the 1972 Summer Olympics.
