= Elizabeth Carruthers =

Canadian diver (born 1951)

Personal information
- Born: September 14, 1951 (age 74) Edmonton, Alberta
Medal record
Women's diving
Representing Canada
British Commonwealth Games
| Silver medal – second place | 1970 Edinburgh | 3 m springboard |
Pan American Games
| Gold medal – first place | 1971 Cali | 3 m springboard |
| Silver medal – second place | 1975 Mexico City | 3 m springboard |

Elizabeth Ann "Liz" Carruthers (born September 14, 1951) is a retired diver from Canada, who represented her native country at the 1972 Summer Olympics in Munich, West Germany. She won a total of two medals (one gold, one silver) at the Pan American Games (1971 and 1975). She won a silver medal at the 1970 British Commonwealth Games.
