= Jorge Telch =

Mexican diver

Personal information
- Born: 22 November 1942 (age 82); Mexico City, Mexico

Sport
- Sport: Diving

Jorge Telch (born 22 November 1942) is a Mexican diver. He competed in the men's 3 metre springboard event at the 1968 Summer Olympics.

At the 1969 Maccabiah Games in Israel, he won two gold medals in diving, including in men's highboard.
