= Diego Henao (diver) =

Colombian diver (born 1947)

Personal information
- Nationality: Colombian
- Born: 9 January 1947 (age 79) Cali, Colombia

Sport
- Sport: Diving
Medal record
Representing Colombia
Pan American Games
Bronze medal – third place	1967 Winnipeg	10m platform
Bronze medal – third place	1971 Cali	10m platform

Diego Henao (born 9 January 1947) is a Colombian diver. He competed at the 1964 Summer Olympics, the 1968 Summer Olympics and the 1972 Summer Olympics.
