= Teri York =

Canadian diver (born 1955)

Personal information
- Born: November 11, 1955 (age 70) Winnipeg, Manitoba, Canada

Sport
- Sport: Diving
Medal record
Women's diving
Representing Canada
British Commonwealth Games
Bronze medal – third place	1974 Christchurch	3 m springboard

Teri York (born 11 November 1955) is a Canadian diver.

York competed at the 1972 Summer Olympics in the 3 metre springboard event and at the 1976 Summer Olympics in the 3 metre springboard event where she finished 14th and in the 10 metre platform event where she finished 6th.

She won a bronze medal at the 1974 British Commonwealth Games in the 3 metres springboard event.
