= Yves Landry =

Canadian cyclist

Personal information
- Born: 13 April 1947 (age 79) Trois-Rivières, Quebec, Canada

Cycling career
- Sport: Cycling

Yves Landry (born 13 April 1947) is a former Canadian cyclist. He competed in the individual road race and the team time trial events at the 1968 Summer Olympics.
