= Jules Béland =

Canadian cyclist

Personal information
- Born: 31 March 1948 (age 78) Quebec City, Quebec, Canada

Cycling career
- Sport: Cycling

Jules Béland (born 31 March 1948) is a Canadian former cyclist. He competed in the individual road race and the team time trial events at the 1968 Summer Olympics.
