= Joseph Thewlis =

English, South African diver

Personal information
- Nationality: British (English) / South African
- Born: 1943 (age 82–83) Tynemouth, England

Sport
- Sport: Diving
- Event: 3m springboard
- Club: Luton Kingfishers

Joseph Thewlis (born 1943), is a male former diver who competed for England and South Africa.

== Biography ==
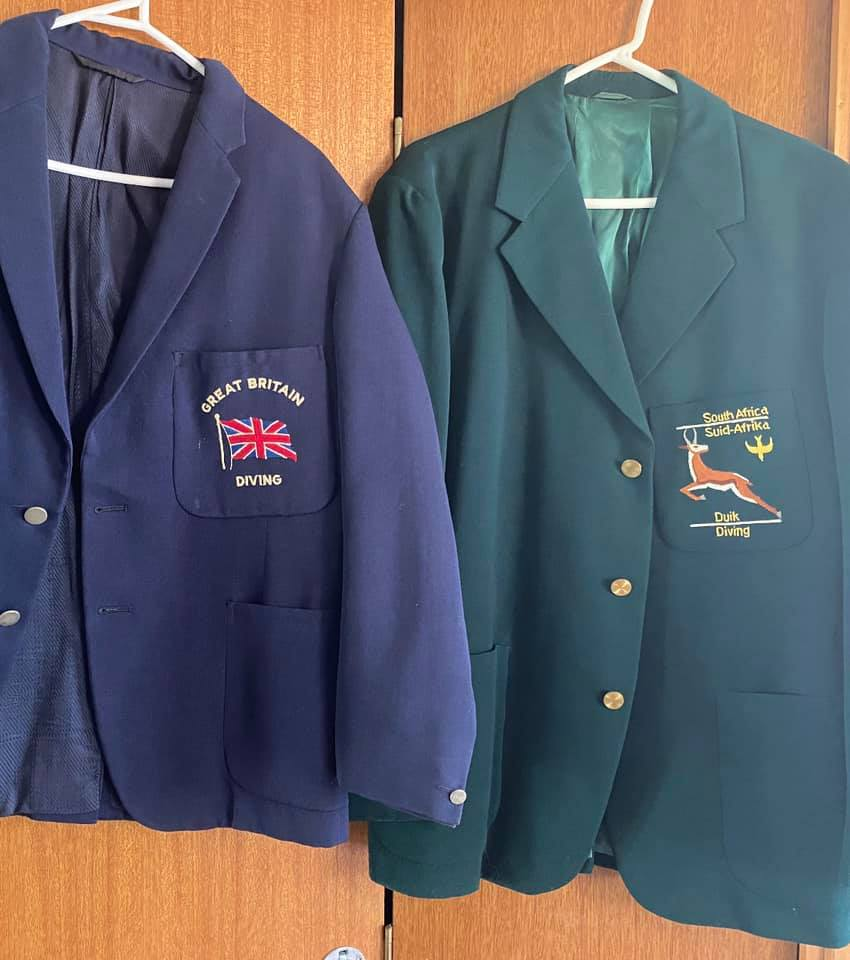
Joe Thewlis blazers

Thewlis was a National junior champion before representing the England team at the 1970 British Commonwealth Games in Edinburgh, Scotland, where he participated in the 3m springboard event.

In 1972 he emigrated to South Africa, where he represented that country in 1975, competing against Rhodesia.
