= Steven Barnett (diver) =

Australian diver (born 1979)

Personal information
- Nationality: Australia
- Born: 15 June 1979 (age 47) Croydon Park, NSW
- Height: 175 cm (5 ft 9 in)
- Weight: 75 kg (165 lb)

Sport
- Sport: Diving
- Club: Barnett Divers
Medal record
Men's diving
Olympic Games
Bronze medal – third place	2004 Athens	Synchronised springboard
Commonwealth Games
Bronze medal – third place	2002 Manchester	1 m springboard
Bronze medal – third place	2006 Melbourne	1 m springboard
Bronze medal – third place	2006 Melbourne	3 m springboard
Bronze medal – third place	2006 Melbourne	3 m springboard synchro

Steven John Barnett (born 15 June 1979) is a male Australian diver, who won a bronze medal in the 2004 Summer Olympics with diving partner Robert Newbery. He was an Australian Institute of Sport scholarship holder. His mother is the 1974 Commonwealth Games bronze medallist diver Madeleine Barnett.
