= Frank Carter (diver) =

British diver

Personal information
- Nationality: British
- Born: 27 October 1942 (age 82) Wigan, England

Sport
- Sport: Diving

Frank Carter (born 27 October 1942) is a British diver. He competed in the men's 3 metre springboard event at the 1968 Summer Olympics.
