= Shelagh Burrow =

English diver

Personal information
- Nationality: British (English)
- Born: 1950 (age 75–76) Dartford, England

Sport
- Sport: Diving
- Event: 10m platform
- Club: Hillingdon Diving School
Medal record
Diving
Representing England
Commonwealth Games
Bronze medal – third place	1970 Edinburgh	10m platform

Shelagh F. J. Burrow (born 1950), is a female former diver who competed for England at the Commonwealth Games.

== Biography ==
Burrow represented the England team at the 1970 British Commonwealth Games in Edinburgh, Scotland, where she participated in the 10m platform event, winning a bronze medal.

She was a member of the Hillingdon Diving School and lived in Ruislip at the time of the Games.

In 1974 she married Graham Meates to become Shelagh Meates.
