= Christopher Walls =

British diver

Personal information
- Born: 3 August 1952 (age 72); Hatfield, Hertfordshire, Great Britain

Sport
- Sport: Diving

Christopher Stephen Walls (born 3 August 1952) is a diver who participated in the Individual Springboard event at the 1972 Summer Olympics in Munich.
