= Trevor Simpson =

British diver

Personal information
- Nationality: England
- Born: 17 March 1951 (age 75) Highgate, England
Medal record
Men's diving
Representing England
Commonwealth Games
Bronze medal – third place	1974 Christchurch	3 m springboard

Trevor Simpson (born 17 March 1951) is a former diver who competed for Great Britain and England.

== Diving career ==
Simpson represented Great Britain at the 1976 Summer Olympics.

Simpson also represented England and won a bronze medal in the 3 metres springboard, at the 1974 British Commonwealth Games in Christchurch, New Zealand. Four years later he competed again for England in the springboard event, at the 1978 Commonwealth Games in Edmonton, Alberta, Canada.

Simpson competed for the Highgate Diving Club.
