= Madeleine Barnett =

Australian diver (born 1946)

Personal information
- Full name: Madeleine Eve Barnett
- Born: 28 October 1946 (age 79)
- Height: 160 cm (5 ft 3 in)
- Weight: 57 kg (126 lb)

Sport
- Sport: Diving
Medal record
Women's diving
Representing Australia
British Commonwealth Games
Bronze medal – third place	1974 Christchurch	10 m highboard

Madeleine Eve Barnett (née Bollinger; born 28 October 1946) is a former Australian diver. She won a bronze medal in the 10 metres highboard event at the 1974 British Commonwealth Games. She also competed at the 1976 Summer Olympics in the 3 metre springboard event where she finished 15th and in the 10 metre platform event where she finished 18th. She is the mother of Olympic bronze medallist diver Steven Barnett.
