= Brian Wetheridge =

British diver

Personal information
- Nationality: British (English)
- Born: 13 January 1953 (age 73) Croydon, England
- Height: 155 cm (5 ft 1 in)
- Weight: 57 kg (126 lb)

Sport
- Sport: Diving
- Event: 3m springboard
- Club: Metropolitan Diving School

Brian Albert Wetheridge (born 13 January 1953), is a male former diver who competed for Great Britain at the 1972 Summer Olympics.

== Biography ==
Wetheridge represented the England team at the 1970 British Commonwealth Games in Edinburgh, Scotland, where he participated in the 3m springboard events..

At the 1972 Olympic Games in Munich, Wetheridge represented Great Britain in the men's 10 metre platform.
