= Vladimir Kapirulin =

Soviet diver

Personal information
- Nationality: Soviet
- Born: 10 September 1953 (age 71)

Sport
- Sport: Diving

Vladimir Kapirulin (born 10 September 1953) is a Soviet diver. He competed in two events at the 1972 Summer Olympics.
