= José Robinson =

Mexican diver

Personal information
- Full name: José de Jesús Robinson González
- Born: 14 February 1945 Reynosa, Tamaulipas, Mexico
- Died: 25 February 1996 (aged 51)
Medal record
Men's diving
Representing Mexico
Pan American Games
Bronze medal – third place	1971 Cali	3 m springboard

José de Jesús Robinson González (14 February 1945 – 25 February 1996) was a Mexican diver who competed in the 1964 Summer Olympics, in the 1968 Summer Olympics, and in the 1972 Summer Olympics. He was born in Reynosa, Tamaulipas.
