= Alison Drake (diver) =

British diver

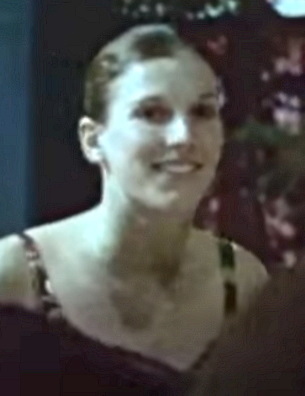
- Alison Drake pictured after a dive during the 1974 Commonwealth Games

Personal information
- Nationality: British (English)
- Born: Alison Jean Drake; 13 December 1952 (age 73) London, England
- Height: 170 cm (5 ft 7 in)
- Weight: 55 kg (121 lb)
- Spouse: Steve Jankowska (after 1978)

Sport
- Sport: Diving
- Event: 3m springboard
- Club: Basildon SC; Derek Beaumont's Diving Academy

Alison Jean Drake (born 13 December 1952) is a female former diver who competed for England. She competed at the 1972 Summer Olympics and the 1980 Summer Olympics.

== Career ==
=== Diving ===
Drake became the English champion when she won the English women's springboard diving championship, at Crystal Palace in 1970 at the age of just 17.

One month earlier she represented England in the 3 metres springboard, at the 1970 British Commonwealth Games in Edinburgh, Scotland. Four years later she represented England again in the 3 metres springboard event at the 1974 British Commonwealth Games in Christchurch, New Zealand. During the 1976 European Cup in Edinburgh, she finished second in the women's 3-metre event with a score of 418.44, just behind Olympic medalist diver Christa Köhler, having finished third with a score of 276.84 during the second round of compulsory dives.

In March 1978, she won the women's European springboard diving title in Nogent sur Marne, France and followed that up in April by winning a gold medal in the European 1-metre championships in Paris, having recently changed coach and joined Derek Beaumont's Diving Academy. Later that year in December, she won the women's event at the Amateur Swimming Association 1-metre springboard championships in Huddersfield, adding to the 3-metre title she had already won earlier in the season.

Following her retirement from diving, Drake took up a coaching position with the Italian national team.

=== Outside diving ===
Drake was working as a bank clerk around 1972 and in 1977, completed a Bachelor of Education degree and started a job at Northumberland Park School, near Tottenham Hotspur F.C. later that year as a maths teacher.

== Personal ==
Drake was in a long-term relationship with Tony Fasoli until 1977, when a "blazing row" at the national championships ended their relationship. She noted that they had "been together too long" and that confidence in the other was lost, but Fasoli was quoted as being "deeply upset" about the split.

Around 1978, she married Steve Jankowska, a drama teacher.
