= Norbert Huda =

German diver

Personal information
- Born: 5 March 1950 (age 75); Gelsenkirchen, West Germany

Sport
- Sport: Diving

Norbert Huda (born 5 March 1950) is a German former diver who competed for West Germany in the Summer Olympics of 1968, 1972 and 1976.
