= Nancy Robertson (diver) =

Canadian diver (born 1949)

Personal information
- Born: December 25, 1949 (age 76) Saskatoon, Saskatchewan, Canada

Sport
- Sport: Diving
Medal record
Representing Canada
British Commonwealth Games
Silver medal – second place	1970 Edinburgh	Platform
Pan American Games
Gold medal – first place	1971 Cali	Platform

Nancy Robertson (born December 25, 1949) is a diver from Saskatoon, Saskatchewan, Canada. She competed at the 1968 Summer Olympics in Mexico City and at the 1972 Summer Olympics Munich, with best result being 7th in platform diving. She won a gold medal at the 1971 Pan American Games, platform diving. She won a silver medal at the 1970 British Commonwealth Games.
