= Ron Friesen =

Canadian diver

Personal information
- Born: 13 February 1949 (age 77) Saskatoon, Saskatchewan, Canada

Sport
- Sport: Diving
Medal record
Representing Canada
Diving
Commonwealth Games
Bronze medal – third place	1970 Edinburgh	3m springboard

Ron Friesen (born 13 February 1949) is a Canadian diver. He was a bronze medal winner during the 1970 British Commonwealth Games at Edinburgh, Scotland in the 3 metre springboard event. He also competed in two events at the 1972 Summer Olympics.

== Early life ==
Friesen was the second of six boys born to Florence Friesen. Prior to diving, he participated in other sports such as gymnastics, judo and swimming and was described as a "natural athlete" who would always be involved with sports being offered at his local youth centre.

== Career ==
Friesen began his diving career competitively in 1967 when he was part of the University of Saskatchewan diving team. While a student of the university, he was named the Outstanding College Diver in Canada in 1969 after topping "a field of intercollegiate talent that stretched from coast to coast" in the 1 metre and 3 metre springboard diving events. He additionally was named to the Canadian college swimming and diving team. He made the national team after just one year of diving, which he described as being unusual but attributed this to his previous experience in gymnastics which gave him leg and arm strength.

At the 1971 Canadian championships, he won three gold medals in each of the diving events, the 1m, 2m and 10-metre respectively before representing Canada at the 1972 Summer Olympics. In 1972, he won an "athlete of the year" award at the Kinsmen Sport Celebrity Dinner, where he was described as "the great diver" and won over eight other nominees. At this time, he was also coaching diving at a beginner level at Goldfins Swimming and Diving Club.

Friesen moved to British Columbia in 1973 to become a pool manager in Port Alberni and remained there. He later changed vocation and studied a law degree at the University of Victoria. He expressed that it took years before he could appreciate his accomplishment in participating in the Olympic games, though noted that he was not particularly happy with his performances.

== Later life ==
In 1994, Friesen was the head of diving for the Canadian team at the 1994 Commonwealth Games in Victoria, British Columbia. By 2003, he was a lawyer and married to Christine Looke, a fellow diver and close friend of Beverly Boys. They first met at the 1971 Pan American Games and were later reintroduced to each other by mutual friends. His daughter Emma followed in his footsteps and took up diving and he has two other children, Dieter and Allegra.
