= Don Webb (diver) =

Canadian diver and coach

Personal information
- Full name: Donald Webb
- Born: 1932 or 1933 (age 93–94) Canada

Sport
- Sport: Diving, coaching

Donald "Don" Webb (born c. 1933) is a Canadian former diver and diving coach, notable for coaching Olympic athletes including Beverly Boys, Judy Stewart and Milena Duchková. He would later coach the Canadian national diving team around 1968 and the men's Olympic team in 1976. Although a professional diver, Webb entered coaching by a chance opportunity to judge a gymnastics competition. His diving career was ended when he fell awkwardly from a dive into a pool and lay unconscious at the bottom for under a minute.

He is the youngest of eight children and has two daughters to wife Mary Ann Ray.

== Career ==
=== Diving ===
His diving interests began at the age of 10, when he joined the YMCA to learn tumbling and diving. His career started at the age of 14, when he professionally toured Western Canada as a carnival high diver. Within four years, he was in Australia, diving off 11-storey buildings in to fire-rimmed watertanks. When he was 30, he won the world high-diving crown in Toronto.

In 1957, then aged 24, Webb decided to quit diving after a dive off a small platform resulted in him landing on his back in the pool and losing consciousness. He was on the bottom of the pool for under a minute, while none of the 150 spectators were aware there was anything wrong until he was pulled above water by his brother Gerald. Webb escaped the incident with just a strained back and later explained that he felt he had made a poor approach and should have landed with his feet first. Following the incident, his fiancée pleaded with him to quit diving, which he agreed to and suggested he would instead devote his time to becoming a salesman. Recalling the incident 10 years on, Webb remarked that "nothing under the sun would get me up there again".

=== Coaching ===
His entry into diving coaching was by accidental chance, when he was asked to judge a gymnastics competition which included Judy Stewart, then a gymnast who impressed Webb with her ability. Reflecting on that time, Webb recalled that he "got a kick out of being involved, and before I knew it, I was coaching Judy on the trampoline". Initially, he would divide his time between coaching gymnastics and diving, before concluding that Stewart, by then his student, would have a better career chance in diving and he chose to fully commit to dive coaching. He had been coaching Canada's Olympic and national diving team in the 1960 Summer Olympics in Tokyo (sic), although remarked that had considered marking 1968 as the end of his coaching career.

By 1970, a handful of divers lived with Webb and his wife, where he would transport the divers through snow drifts to and from practice sessions and his station wagon was described as being "always over-loaded with young Canadians aspiring to become Olympians". In June 1970, Webb, then described as one of Canada's top diving coaches, announced his intention to retire from coaching after the 1970 British Commonwealth Games in Edinburgh, as he was critical of the fact that coaching diving in Canada was not paid employment and was under pressure to financially support his family. Webb had to fund his own expenses to travel with the team to Edinburgh as the Canadian Amateur Diving Association did not budget to bring Webb along. Webb had recently lost his third job in 10 years due to spending too much time voluntarily coaching divers.

During a news conference in March 1974 regarding announcements for the April 1974 Canada Cup diving competition, Webb was asked if he believed the reason that girls dominated Canada's sport scene was because they were more dedicated and able to make sacrifices. In response, Webb disagreed, suggesting that girls were instead more able to make greater sacrifices due to a Canadian society that would place greater expectations on boys to complete their schooling and reach financial independence sooner than girls. Webb further suggested that "in most Canadian homes, the parents don't get upset if a daughter spends an extra year or so to finish her schooling". Webb was also known to be coaching the men's Olympic team in 1976. His coaching style was described as "animated and sometimes volatile". Webb coached Olympic gold-winning medalist Milena Duchková and arranged her one-year visa for her to live in Canada.

In 1980, he was one of six national team coaches for Dive Canada and praised the federal government in helping Canada reach a healthy position in the world diving scene, with $27,000 provided by Sport Canada to help towards costs. Additionally, he worked as coach for the "powerful" Pointe Claire team and in 1984, believed he had "the best group of divers he's ever been involved with". By 1990, he was credited as helping to make Canada "a world-ranked power in the sport". Webb was coaching David Bedard by 1990, who he described as having had to overcome a fear of diving.

== Personal ==
Webb's father, an enthusiastic sports spectator, worked as a railroad worker and Webb himself was the youngest of eight children. His brother Gerald was a year younger than him and he married Mary Ann Ray. His nephew Jim Lambie was also a diving coach.

He is a father of two daughters, his elder, Kelly, born c. 1962.
