= Scott Cranham =

Canadian diver (born 1954)

Personal information
- Born: September 8, 1954 (age 71) Toronto, Ontario, Canada

Sport
- Country: Canada
- Sport: Diving
- Event(s): 3 m springboard, 10 m platform
Medal record
Men's diving
Representing Canada
Commonwealth Games
Silver medal – second place	1974 Christchurch	3 m springboard
Silver medal – second place	1978 Edmonton	3 m springboard
Bronze medal – third place	1974 Christchurch	10 m platform
Bronze medal – third place	1978 Edmonton	10 m platform

Scott Cranham (born September 8, 1954) is a Canadian diver, who represented Canada at the 1972 Summer Olympics, the 1974 British Commonwealth Games, the 1976 Summer Olympics and the 1978 Commonwealth Games. He was also slated to compete in the 1980 Summer Olympics, but did not attend due to Canada's participation in the 1980 Summer Olympics boycott.

Cranham won medals in both of his Commonwealth Games competitions, but did not win Olympic medals.

Cranham came out as gay after his competitive career ended. In his autobiography Breaking the Surface, Greg Louganis wrote that Cranham was the first fellow athlete to whom Louganis ever came out; Cranham himself was still in the closet at the time and did not react positively, although the two are now friends. (Cranham was portrayed by Gregor Trpin in the book's 1997 film adaptation Breaking the Surface: The Greg Louganis Story.) He also competed at the 1990 Gay Games in Vancouver and the 1994 Gay Games in New York City, winning medals in the Age 35-39 competition class at both events.

He remains active as a diving coach and staffer for Diving Plongeon Canada, the national coordinating organization of diving clubs and programs in Canada.

== Achievements ==
Year	Competition	Venue	Position	Notes
Representing Canada
1972 Summer Olympics	Men's 3 metre springboard	Munich, Germany	14th	339.21 points
1972 Summer Olympics	Men's 10 metre platform	Munich, Germany	27th	263.52 points
1974 British Commonwealth Games	Men's 3 metre springboard	Christchurch, New Zealand	2nd	509.61 points
1974 British Commonwealth Games	Men's 10 metre platform	Christchurch, New Zealand	3rd	460.98 points
1976 Summer Olympics	Men's 3 metre springboard	Montreal, Quebec, Canada	16th	485.97 points
1976 Summer Olympics	Men's 10 metre platform	Montreal, Quebec, Canada	17th	439.80 points
1978 Commonwealth Games	Men's 3 metre springboard	Edmonton, Alberta, Canada	2nd	595.53 points
1978 Commonwealth Games	Men's 10 metre platform	Edmonton, Alberta, Canada	3rd	512.37 points
