= Irene MacDonald =

Canadian diver (1931–2002)

Personal information
- Full name: Irene Margaret MacDonald
- Born: November 22, 1931 Hamilton, Ontario
- Died: June 20, 2002 (aged 70)

Sport
- Sport: Diving
Medal record
Women's diving
Representing Canada
Olympic Games
| Bronze medal – third place | 1956 Melbourne | 3 metre springboard |

Irene Margaret MacDonald, OBC (November 22, 1931 – June 20, 2002) was a Canadian athlete, sports executive and broadcaster from Hamilton, Ontario. She won Canada's first-ever Olympic diving medal, a bronze, at the 1956 Summer Games.

Orphaned at a young age, she attended the Hamilton Aquatics Club. MacDonald won the Canadian National Springboard title in 1951, which was her first of nine titles in this event up to 1961; she only failed to win it in 1953.

MacDonald was selected for the 1952 Summer Olympics, but due to the lack of funding she was unable to attend. Four years later she competed in Melbourne, at the 1956 Summer Olympics, in the 3 metre springboard, MacDonald finished the preliminary round of six dives in second place and so advanced to the final, in the final she did another four dives and finished in fifth but with all the scores combined she won the bronze medal. In Rome, at the 1960 Summer Olympics, MacDonald reached both finals, finishing sixth in the 3 metre springboard and she finished in ninth in the 10 metre platform.

She won a bronze medal in 3 Metres Springboard Diving at the 1954 British Empire and Commonwealth Games and a silver medal at the 1958 British Empire and Commonwealth Games. She also competed at the 1960 Summer Olympics.

MacDonald was forced to retire in 1961 due to a detached retina.

She was a broadcaster for CBC Television covering diving events from the 1976 Summer Olympics through to the 1988 Summer Olympics.

In 1991, she was made a Member of the Order of British Columbia. She is a member of the BC Sports Hall of Fame, the Canadian Sports Hall of Fame, and the Canadian Olympic Hall of Fame.

== Sources ==
- Allan Woods (July 23, 2002). "Irene MacDonald: Canada's 'queen of the springboard'". The Globe and Mail. p. R9.
