= Don Wagstaff =

Australian diver

Personal information
- Born: Donald Douglas Wagstaff; 24 July 1949 (age 76)

Sport
- Country: Australia
- Sport: Diving
- Event(s): 3 m springboard, 10 m platform
- Coached by: Frank Murphy
Medal record
Men's diving
Representing Australia
Commonwealth Games
Gold medal – first place	1970 Edinburgh	3 m springboard
Gold medal – first place	1970 Edinburgh	10 m platform
Gold medal – first place	1974 Christchurch	3 m springboard
Gold medal – first place	1974 Christchurch	10 m platform
Silver medal – second place	1966 Kingston	3 m springboard
Silver medal – second place	1966 Kingston	10 m platform
Bronze medal – third place	1978 Edmonton	3 m springboard

Donald Douglas Wagstaff, MBE (born 24 July 1949) is an Australian former diver who competed in the 1968 Summer Olympics, in the 1972 Summer Olympics, and in the 1976 Summer Olympics. He also participated in four Commonwealth Games events, from the 1966 Games in Kingston up to the 1978 Commonwealth Games in Edmonton.

== Career ==
=== 1960s ===
Upon arriving in Kingston, Jamaica for the 1966 Commonwealth Games, Wagstaff and fellow diver Chris Robb were the first to start training immediately upon arrival, despite the day being declared one of "relaxation and settling in", due to the long trip from Sydney, Australia. Their opportunity to train was limited, as the pool staff were not expecting them so soon upon their arrival. Wagstaff went on to win two silver medals at the games, one in each of the men's diving events. He was the only male diver to represent Australia during the 1968 Summer Olympics.

=== 1970s ===
In the men's diving event of the 1970 British Commonwealth Games in Edinburgh, Scotland, Wagstaff picked up gold medals in both of the events and became the first Australian man to win a gold medal in a springboard event at any previous Olympic or Commonwealth Games. Wagstaff was described as having given "the best exhibition of spring-board diving seen by an Australian". His achievement was witnessed by his mum, who had to save $1000 in order to travel to the games and filmed him diving on her movie camera. In 1971, following his diving success, he attended The Age Sports Star of the Year banquet in Melbourne, at a time when he was being described as "the greatest diver Australia has ever produced".

In July 1972, he competed in an international diving competition held in Helsinki, where he won the men's springboard event. Shortly after, he participated in the 1972 Summer Olympics held in Munich. In the 1974 Christchurch Commonwealth Games, Wagstaff retained his gold-medal status in both events, having had to come from behind in the 10-metre tower event, beating Scott Cranham despite messing up his 4th dive. Following his double gold medal wins in 1974, it would be another 20 years before an Australian would win a two gold medal double in Commonwealth Games diving, with diver Michael Murphy achieving the honour. During an international diving competition held in Vienna during June 1975, he finished fifth in the men's springboard event with a score of 501.15, in a competition where Australians finished among the top competitors.

During the 1976 Summer Olympics, Wagstaff missed qualifying in his respective event by just 1.74 points, having finished ninth with 529.11 points. His coach Frank Murphy was critical of the judging panel, suggesting they were bias in their awarding of points towards competitors of their own country, in particular the points awarded by the Italian judge which he deemed a "fiasco". Murphy considered Wagstaff to have "a seemingly unbeatable lead" over fellow competitor Greg Louganis, who was then awarded a "phenomenal" 69.90 points in his final dive to secure his own place, although Murphy did concede that the dive difficulty undertaken by Louganis was higher than Wagstaff's.

In 1977, Wagstaff won the men's 3-metre springboard title during the Australian Winter Diving Championships, defeating John Pendall and having been 18 points clear by the 5th round and ultimately winning by a margin of 5.90 points. His last competitive event was in the 1978 Commonwealth Games, where he could only finish in 3rd place in the 3-metre springboard event, having previously won it on the last two occasions. When asked about the possibility of competing during the 1982 Commonwealth Games, which were held in his home country in the city of Brisbane, he conceded that he would "probably be in a Judge's chair by then". He ultimately was a commentator for the 1982 games.

== Post retirement ==
In the 1980 Birthday Honours list, Wagstaff was named as receiving an MBE for services to diving. He was presented with a special award by Prince Philip, Duke of Edinburgh in October 1982, in which he was included among 10 of Australia's best all-time athletes, yet only first heard about his award when he read the preceding day's newspaper.

== Personal life ==
Born Donald Douglas Wagstaff, his father was in the navy during World War II and he would frequently dive from the mast of a destroyer into the ocean "just for the hell of it". His son Peter also took up diving.
