= Kenneth Sully =

Canadian diver

Personal information
- Nationality: Canadian
- Born: 28 November 1950 (age 75) New Westminster, British Columbia, Canada

Sport
- Sport: Diving
Medal record
Men's diving
Representing Canada
British Commonwealth Games
Silver medal – second place	1970 Edinburgh	3 m springboard

Kenneth Sully (born 28 November 1950) is a Canadian diver. He competed at the 1968 Summer Olympics and the 1972 Summer Olympics.
