= Beverly Boys =

Canadian diver (born 1951)

Personal information
- Nationality: Canada
- Born: July 4, 1951 (age 75) Toronto, Ontario, Canada
- Height: 5 ft 3 in (160 cm)
- Weight: 126 lb (57 kg)

Sport
- Country: Canada
- Events: 10m platform, 3m springboard
Medal record
Pan American Games
Silver medal – second place	1967 Winnipeg	Platform
Silver medal – second place	1971 Cali	Platform
Bronze medal – third place	1971 Cali	Springboard
Commonwealth Games
Silver medal – second place	1966 Kingston	Springboard
Bronze medal – third place	1966 Kingston	Highboard
Gold medal – first place	1970 Edinburgh	Highboard
Gold medal – first place	1970 Edinburgh	Springboard
Gold medal – first place	1974 Christchurch	Highboard
Silver medal – second place	1974 Christchurch	Springboard
Silver medal – second place	1978 Edmonton	Springboard

Beverly Boys (born July 4, 1951) is a retired diver from Canada, who represented her native country in three consecutive Summer Olympics, starting in 1968. She won two silver medals and one bronze at the Pan American Games in 1967 and 1971.

Boys was born in Toronto, Ontario. She won one silver and one bronze medal at the 1966 British Empire and Commonwealth Games, two gold medals at the 1970 British Commonwealth Games, a gold and a silver medal at the 1974 British Commonwealth Games, and a silver medal at the 1978 Commonwealth Games.

Boys was inducted into the Ontario Sports Hall of Fame in 2005, and became a Member of the Order of Canada in 2015.

Now retired, Boys resides in Vancouver, British Columbia and continues to be involved with BC Diving. She coaches competitive divers at iDive at the Vancouver Aquatic Centre and White Rock Divers, and continues to organize and judge diving competitions throughout British Columbia such as the Irene MacDonald, BC Summer Games, and other provincial competitions.

Boys, on June 30th, 2026, attempted to evict a 7-year-old child from the divers-only area of the Grandview Aquatic Centre. She flagged down a lifeguard and asked them to remove the 7-year old child because she did not recognize her, then argued with the parent of that child that the child was not enrolled. The child had been enrolled with White Rock Divers for months. After the incident, Beverly started repeating to adults in the area that she does not know who is or is not enrolled in White Rock Divers. Confirmed via email with the organization, the coaches will not make introductions and learn a child enrolled in the program's name unless that child's parent schedules a meeting with the coaches in advance.
