= List of Asian Games medalists in diving =

Asian Games list

This is the complete list of Asian Games medalists in diving from 1951 to 2026.

== Men ==
=== 1 m springboard ===
Games	Gold	Silver	Bronze
1990 Beijing	Tan Liangde (CHN)	Wang Yijie (CHN)	Chimaki Yasuda (JPN)
2006 Doha	Luo Yutong (CHN)	Qin Kai (CHN)	Ken Terauchi (JPN)
2010 Guangzhou	He Min (CHN)	Qin Kai (CHN)	Yeoh Ken Nee (MAS)
2014 Incheon	He Chao (CHN)	He Chong (CHN)	Woo Ha-ram (KOR)
2018 Jakarta–Palembang	Peng Jianfeng (CHN)	Liu Chengming (CHN)	Woo Ha-ram (KOR)
2022 Hangzhou	Wang Zongyuan (CHN)	Peng Jianfeng (CHN)	Woo Ha-ram (KOR)
2026 Aichi–Nagoya	Wang Zongyuan (CHN)	Kim Yeong-nam (KOR)	Liu Chengzan (CHN)

=== 3 m springboard ===
Games	Gold	Silver	Bronze
1951 New Delhi	K. P. Thakkar (IND)	Ashu Dutt (IND)	Taghi Asgari (IRN)
1954 Manila	Yoav Ra'anan (ISR)	Katsuichi Mori (JPN)	Yutaka Baba (JPN)
1958 Tokyo	Yutaka Baba (JPN)	Shohachi Sakamoto (JPN)	Manouchehr Fasihi (IRN)
1962 Jakarta	Ryohei Okada (JPN)	Kazuo Tahara (JPN)	Billy Gumulya (INA)
1966 Bangkok	Yasuo Yamawaki (JPN)	Takashi Inoue (JPN)	Billy Gumulya (INA)
1970 Bangkok	Takashi Kioka (JPN)	Billy Gumulya (INA)	Song Jae-ung (KOR)
1974 Tehran	Xie Caiming (CHN)	Koo Ho-suk (KOR)	Liu Sui (CHN)
1978 Bangkok	Wu Guocun (CHN)	Li Kongzheng (CHN)	Taizo Kawanami (JPN)
1982 New Delhi	Li Kongzheng (CHN)	Tan Liangde (CHN)	Masashi Nakashima (JPN)
1986 Seoul	Tan Liangde (CHN)	Xu Wenzhan (CHN)	Lee Sun-gee (KOR)
1990 Beijing	Tan Liangde (CHN)	Li Deliang (CHN)	Lee Yuan-ming (TPE)
1994 Hiroshima	Wang Tianling (CHN)	Yu Zhuocheng (CHN)	Chimaki Yasuda (JPN)
1998 Bangkok	Zhou Yilin (CHN)	Yu Zhuocheng (CHN)	Suchart Pichi (THA)
2002 Busan	Wang Tianling (CHN)	Wang Feng (CHN)	Yeoh Ken Nee (MAS)
2006 Doha	He Chong (CHN)	Luo Yutong (CHN)	Ken Terauchi (JPN)
2010 Guangzhou	He Chong (CHN)	Luo Yutong (CHN)	Yeoh Ken Nee (MAS)
2014 Incheon	Cao Yuan (CHN)	He Chao (CHN)	Sho Sakai (JPN)
2018 Jakarta–Palembang	Xie Siyi (CHN)	Cao Yuan (CHN)	Chew Yiwei (MAS)
2022 Hangzhou	Wang Zongyuan (CHN)	Zheng Jiuyuan (CHN)	Yi Jae-gyeong (KOR)
2026 Aichi–Nagoya	Wang Zongyuan (CHN)	Zheng Jiuyuan (CHN)	Sho Sakai (JPN)

=== 10 m platform ===
Games	Gold	Silver	Bronze
1951 New Delhi	K. P. Thakkar (IND)	Taghi Asgari (IRN)	T. T. Dand (IND)
1954 Manila	Katsuichi Mori (JPN)	Yoav Ra'anan (ISR)	K. P. Thakkar (IND)
1958 Tokyo	Ryo Mabuchi (JPN)	Toshio Yamano (JPN)	Hassan Azami (IRN)
1962 Jakarta	Ryohei Okada (JPN)	Hiroshi Taniguchi (JPN)	Cho Chang-jae (KOR)
1966 Bangkok	Yosuke Arimitsu (JPN)	Yasuo Yamawaki (JPN)	Song Jae-ung (KOR)
1970 Bangkok	Song Jae-ung (KOR)	Toshio Otsubo (JPN)	Toshiaki Hayashi (JPN)
1974 Tehran	Li Kongzheng (CHN)	Du Du (CHN)	Tsutomu Kimura (JPN)
1978 Bangkok	Liu Henglin (CHN)	Li Hongping (CHN)	Taizo Kawanami (JPN)
1982 New Delhi	Tong Hui (CHN)	Zhang Ting (CHN)	Masashi Nakashima (JPN)
1986 Seoul	Tong Hui (CHN)	Tu Junhui (CHN)	Keita Kaneto (JPN)
1990 Beijing	Sun Shuwei (CHN)	Xiong Ni (CHN)	Keita Kaneto (JPN)
1994 Hiroshima	Sun Shuwei (CHN)	Xiao Hailiang (CHN)	Keita Kaneto (JPN)
1998 Bangkok	Tian Liang (CHN)	Huang Qiang (CHN)	Suchart Pichi (THA)
2002 Busan	Tian Liang (CHN)	Xu Xiang (CHN)	Jo Chol-ryong (PRK)
2006 Doha	Lin Yue (CHN)	Zhou Lüxin (CHN)	Kim Chon-man (PRK)
2010 Guangzhou	Cao Yuan (CHN)	Huo Liang (CHN)	Bryan Nickson Lomas (MAS)
2014 Incheon	Qiu Bo (CHN)	Yang Jian (CHN)	Woo Ha-ram (KOR)
2018 Jakarta–Palembang	Yang Jian (CHN)	Qiu Bo (CHN)	Woo Ha-ram (KOR)
2022 Hangzhou	Yang Hao (CHN)	Bai Yuming (CHN)	Rikuto Tamai (JPN)
2026 Aichi–Nagoya	Lian Junjie (CHN)	Rikuto Tamai (JPN)	Zhao Renjie (CHN)

=== Synchronized 3 m springboard ===
Games	Gold	Silver	Bronze
2002 Busan	Peng Bo and Wang Kenan (CHN)	Cho Kwan-hoon and Kwon Kyung-min (KOR)	Yeoh Ken Nee and Rossharisham Roslan (MAS)
2006 Doha	Wang Feng and He Chong (CHN)	Rossharisham Roslan and Yeoh Ken Nee (MAS)	Kwon Kyung-min and Cho Kwan-hoon (KOR)
2010 Guangzhou	Luo Yutong and Qin Kai (CHN)	Bryan Nickson Lomas and Yeoh Ken Nee (MAS)	Park Ji-ho and Son Seong-cheol (KOR)
2014 Incheon	Cao Yuan and Lin Yue (CHN)	Ahmad Amsyar Azman and Ooi Tze Liang (MAS)	Kim Yeong-nam and Woo Ha-ram (KOR)
2018 Jakarta–Palembang	Cao Yuan and Xie Siyi (CHN)	Kim Yeong-nam and Woo Ha-ram (KOR)	Sho Sakai and Ken Terauchi (JPN)
2022 Hangzhou	Yan Siyu and He Chao (CHN)	Yi Jae-gyeong and Woo Ha-ram (KOR)	Syafiq Puteh and Ooi Tze Liang (MAS)
2026 Aichi–Nagoya	Wang Zongyuan and Zheng Jiuyuan (CHN)	Senri Ikuma and Haruki Suyama (KOR)	Yong Rui Jie and Nurqayyum Nazmi Nazim (MAS)

=== Synchronized 10 m platform ===
Games	Gold	Silver	Bronze
2002 Busan	Hu Jia and Xu Hao (CHN)	Ri Jong-nam and Jo Chol-ryong (PRK)	Cho Kwan-hoon and Kwon Kyung-min (KOR)
2006 Doha	Lin Yue and Huo Liang (CHN)	Ri Jong-nam and Kim Chon-man (PRK)	Kwon Kyung-min and Cho Kwan-hoon (KOR)
2010 Guangzhou	Yang Liguang and Zhou Lüxin (CHN)	Bryan Nickson Lomas and Ooi Tze Liang (MAS)	Kim Chon-man and So Myong-hyok (PRK)
2014 Incheon	Zhang Yanquan and Chen Aisen (CHN)	Kim Yeong-nam and Woo Ha-ram (KOR)	Chew Yiwei and Ooi Tze Liang (MAS)
2018 Jakarta–Palembang	Chen Aisen and Yang Hao (CHN)	Kim Yeong-nam and Woo Ha-ram (KOR)	Hyon Il-myong and Rim Kum-song (PRK)
2022 Hangzhou	Yang Hao and Lian Junjie (CHN)	Yi Jae-gyeong and Kim Yeong-nam (KOR)	Bertrand Rhodict Lises and Enrique Maccartney Harold (MAS)
2026 Aichi–Nagoya	Yang Hao and Lian Junjie (CHN)	Enrique Maccartney Harold and Elvis Priestly Clement (MAS)	Shin Jung-whi and Kim Yeong-taek (KOR)

=== Team ===
Games	Gold	Silver	Bronze
1990 Beijing	China (CHN); Li Deliang; Sun Shuwei; Tan Liangde; Wang Yijie; Xiong Ni	Japan (JPN); Keita Kaneto; Takamasa Ogasawara; Chimaki Yasuda	North Korea (PRK); An Chol-hyok; Cho Gum-san; Kim Yong-su; Song Yong-il

== Women ==
=== 1 m springboard ===
Games	Gold	Silver	Bronze
1990 Beijing	Gao Min (CHN)	Yu Xiaoling (CHN)	Yuki Motobuchi (JPN)
2006 Doha	Wu Minxia (CHN)	He Zi (CHN)	Elizabeth Jimie (MAS)
2010 Guangzhou	Wu Minxia (CHN)	Zheng Shuangxue (CHN)	Cheong Jun Hoong (MAS)
2014 Incheon	Shi Tingmao (CHN)	Wang Han (CHN)	Kim Na-mi (KOR)
2018 Jakarta–Palembang	Wang Han (CHN)	Chen Yiwen (CHN)	Kim Su-ji (KOR)
2022 Hangzhou	Li Yajie (CHN)	Lin Shan (CHN)	Kim Su-ji (KOR)
2026 Aichi–Nagoya	Lin Shan (CHN)	Long Yiping (CHN)	Kim Su-ji (KOR)

=== 3 m springboard ===
Games	Gold	Silver	Bronze
1954 Manila	Masami Miyamoto (JPN)	Shuko Sakaguchi (JPN)	Kanoko Tsutani (JPN)
1958 Tokyo	Kanoko Tsutani (JPN)	Sakuko Kadokura (JPN)	Taisia Yastreboff (ROC)
1962 Jakarta	Lanny Gumulya (INA)	Sakuko Kadokura (JPN)	Kayoko Tomoe (JPN)
1966 Bangkok	Keiko Osaki (JPN)	Nobuyo Ishiguro (JPN)	Connie Paredes (PHI)
1970 Bangkok	Kanoko Mabuchi (JPN)	Yoko Arimitsu (JPN)	Mirnawati Hardjolukito (INA)
1974 Tehran	Zhong Shaozhen (CHN)	Song Yunzang (CHN)	Kanoko Mabuchi (JPN)
1978 Bangkok	Shi Meiqin (CHN)	Peng Yuanchun (CHN)	Rikiko Yamanaka (JPN)
1982 New Delhi	Li Yihua (CHN)	Yan Shuping (CHN)	Yoshino Mabuchi (JPN)
1986 Seoul	Zhang Yuping (CHN)	Li Qiaoxian (CHN)	Yuki Motobuchi (JPN)
1990 Beijing	Gao Min (CHN)	Zhang Yuping (CHN)	Yuki Motobuchi (JPN)
1994 Hiroshima	Tan Shuping (CHN)	Fu Mingxia (CHN)	Yuki Motobuchi (JPN)
1998 Bangkok	Guo Jingjing (CHN)	Yang Lan (CHN)	Irina Vyguzova (KAZ)
2002 Busan	Guo Jingjing (CHN)	Wu Minxia (CHN)	Ryoko Nishii (JPN)
2006 Doha	Wu Minxia (CHN)	He Zi (CHN)	Leong Mun Yee (MAS)
2010 Guangzhou	He Zi (CHN)	Shi Tingmao (CHN)	Choi Sut Ian (MAC)
2014 Incheon	He Zi (CHN)	Wang Han (CHN)	Cheong Jun Hoong (MAS)
2018 Jakarta–Palembang	Shi Tingmao (CHN)	Wang Han (CHN)	Nur Dhabitah Sabri (MAS)
2022 Hangzhou	Chen Yiwen (CHN)	Chang Yani (CHN)	Sayaka Mikami (JPN)
2026 Aichi–Nagoya	Chen Yiwen (CHN)	Chen Jia (CHN)	Sayaka Mikami (JPN)

=== 10 m platform ===
Games	Gold	Silver	Bronze
1954 Manila	Masami Miyamoto (JPN)	Shuko Sakaguchi (JPN)	Kanoko Tsutani (JPN)
1958 Tokyo	Kumiko Watanabe (JPN)	Masami Miyamoto (JPN)	None awarded
1962 Jakarta	Kayoko Tomoe (JPN)	Sakuko Kadokura (JPN)	Lanny Gumulya (INA)
1966 Bangkok	Keiko Osaki (JPN)	Nobuyo Ishiguro (JPN)	Kim Young-chae (KOR)
1970 Bangkok	Yoko Arimitsu (JPN)	Kim Young-chae (KOR)	Tasanee Srivipat (THA)
1974 Tehran	Zhong Shaozhen (CHN)	Fusako Kakumaru (JPN)	Lao Shucheng (CHN)
1978 Bangkok	Chen Xiaoxia (CHN)	You Jianli (CHN)	Rikiko Yamanaka (JPN)
1982 New Delhi	Lü Wei (CHN)	Zhou Jihong (CHN)	Yoshino Mabuchi (JPN)
1986 Seoul	Lü Wei (CHN)	Xu Yanmei (CHN)	Yayoi Kihara (JPN)
1990 Beijing	Xu Yanmei (CHN)	Kim Chun-ok (PRK)	Fu Mingxia (CHN)
1994 Hiroshima	Chi Bin (CHN)	Wang Rui (CHN)	Natalya Chikina (KAZ)
1998 Bangkok	Cai Yuyan (CHN)	Li Na (CHN)	Choe Myong-hwa (PRK)
2002 Busan	Lao Lishi (CHN)	Li Na (CHN)	Kim Kyong-ju (PRK)
2006 Doha	Wang Xin (CHN)	Chen Ruolin (CHN)	Hong In-sun (PRK)
2010 Guangzhou	Hu Yadan (CHN)	Wang Hao (CHN)	Pandelela Rinong (MAS)
2014 Incheon	Si Yajie (CHN)	Huang Xiaohui (CHN)	Kim Un-hyang (PRK)
2018 Jakarta–Palembang	Si Yajie (CHN)	Zhang Jiaqi (CHN)	Kim Mi-rae (PRK)
2022 Hangzhou	Quan Hongchan (CHN)	Chen Yuxi (CHN)	Pandelela Rinong (MAS)
2026 Aichi–Nagoya	Chen Yuxi (CHN)	Lu Wei (CHN)	Jo Jin-mi (PRK)

=== Synchronized 3 m springboard ===
Games	Gold	Silver	Bronze
2002 Busan	Guo Jingjing and Wu Minxia (CHN)	Kang Min-kyung and Im Sung-young (KOR)	Farah Begum Abdullah and Leong Mun Yee (MAS)
2006 Doha	Guo Jingjing and Li Ting (CHN)	Misako Yamashita and Ryoko Nishii (JPN)	Leong Mun Yee and Elizabeth Jimie (MAS)
2010 Guangzhou	Shi Tingmao and Wang Han (CHN)	Leong Mun Yee and Ng Yan Yee (MAS)	Mai Nakagawa and Sayaka Shibusawa (JPN)
2014 Incheon	Shi Tingmao and Wu Minxia (CHN)	Cheong Jun Hoong and Ng Yan Yee (MAS)	Choe Un-gyong and Kim Jin-ok (PRK)
2018 Jakarta–Palembang	Chang Yani and Shi Tingmao (CHN)	Ng Yan Yee and Nur Dhabitah Sabri (MAS)	Kim Kwang-hui and Kim Mi-hwa (PRK)
2022 Hangzhou	Chen Yiwen and Chang Yani (CHN)	Ng Yan Yee and Nur Dhabitah Sabri (MAS)	Park Ha-reum and Kim Su-ji (KOR)
2026 Aichi–Nagoya	Chen Yiwen and Chen Jia (CHN)	Kim Su-ji and Kim Na-hyun (KOR)	Ong Ker Ying and Lee Yiat Qing (MAS)

=== Synchronized 10 m platform ===
Games	Gold	Silver	Bronze
2002 Busan	Duan Qing and Li Ting (CHN)	Kim Kyong-ju and Jon Hyon-ju (PRK)	Emi Otsuki and Takiri Miyazaki (JPN)
2006 Doha	Jia Tong and Chen Ruolin (CHN)	Misako Yamashita and Mai Nakagawa (JPN)	Hong In-sun and Choe Kum-hui (PRK)
2010 Guangzhou	Chen Ruolin and Wang Hao (CHN)	Leong Mun Yee and Pandelela Rinong (MAS)	Choe Kum-hui and Kim Un-hyang (PRK)
2014 Incheon	Chen Ruolin and Liu Huixia (CHN)	Kim Un-hyang and Song Nam-hyang (PRK)	Leong Mun Yee and Pandelela Rinong (MAS)
2018 Jakarta–Palembang	Zhang Jiaqi and Zhang Minjie (CHN)	Kim Kuk-hyang and Kim Mi-rae (PRK)	Leong Mun Yee and Nur Dhabitah Sabri (MAS)
2022 Hangzhou	Quan Hongchan and Chen Yuxi (CHN)	Matsuri Arai and Minami Itahashi (JPN)	Nur Dhabitah Sabri and Pandelela Rinong (MAS)
2026 Aichi–Nagoya	Chen Yuxi and Lu Wei (CHN)	Jo Jin-mi and Kim Mi-rae (PRK)	Kim Na-hyun and Moon Na-yun (KOR)

=== Team ===
Games	Gold	Silver	Bronze
1990 Beijing	China (CHN); Fu Mingxia; Gao Min; Xu Yanmei; Yu Xiaoling; Zhang Yuping	North Korea (PRK); Ho Yong-hwa; Kang Hyon-suk; Kim Chun-ok; Kim Hye-ok	Japan (JPN); Masako Asada; Yuki Motobuchi; Kaoru Yonekura
