= Diving at the 1988 Summer Olympics – Men's 3 metre springboard =

Men's 3 metre springboard at the Games of the XXIV Olympiad

Medalists
1st place, gold medalist(s)		Greg Louganis	United States
2nd place, silver medalist(s)		Tan Liangde	China
3rd place, bronze medalist(s)		Li Deliang	China

The men's 3 metre springboard, also reported as springboard diving, was one of four diving events on the Diving at the 1988 Summer Olympics programme. Defending champion Greg Louganis completed the preliminary qualifying after hitting his head on the springboard while performing a reverse 2½ pike in the third round and suffering a concussion, and continued to the finals to win the gold medal.

The competition was split into two phases:

1. Preliminary round (19 September)
  Divers performed eleven dives. The twelve divers with the highest scores advanced to the final.
2. Final (20 September)
  Divers performed another set of eleven dives and the score here obtained determined the final ranking.

== Results ==
Rank	Diver	Nation	Preliminary		Final
Rank	Diver	Nation	Points	Rank	Points
1st place, gold medalist(s)	Greg Louganis	United States	629.67	3	730.80
2nd place, silver medalist(s)	Tan Liangde	China	682.65	1	704.88
3rd place, bronze medalist(s)	Li Deliang	China	607.77	4	665.28
4	Albin Killat	West Germany	642.60	2	661.47
5	Mark Bradshaw	United States	588.15	7	642.99
6	Jorge Mondragón	Mexico	594.36	5	616.02
7	Jesús Mena	Mexico	581.01	8	598.77
8	Edwin Jongejans	Netherlands	591.45	6	588.33
9	Niki Stajković	Austria	579.63	9	570.60
10	Aleksandr Portnov	Soviet Union	561.81	12	563.37
11	Keita Kaneto	Japan	577.50	10	562.05
12	Valery Goncharov	Soviet Union	570.63	11	554.16
13	Massimo Castellani	Italy	553.74	13	Did not advance
14	Joakim Andersson	Sweden	549.99	14	Did not advance
15	Tom Lemaire	Belgium	549.09	15	Did not advance
16	Piero Italiani	Italy	542.67	16	Did not advance
17	Larry Flewwelling	Canada	541.14	17	Did not advance
18	Isao Yamagishi	Japan	540.72	18	Did not advance
19	Erich Pils	Austria	532.92	19	Did not advance
20	David Bédard	Canada	532.62	20	Did not advance
21	Willi Meyer	West Germany	511.98	21	Did not advance
22	Juha Ovaskainen	Finland	500.76	22	Did not advance
23	Graeme Banks	Australia	499.41	23	Did not advance
24	Jérôme Nalliod	France	496.17	24	Did not advance
25	José Miguel Gil	Spain	483.12	25	Did not advance
26	Graham Morris	Great Britain	478.74	26	Did not advance
27	Tomasz Rossa	Poland	475.44	27	Did not advance
28	Russell Butler	Australia	470.19	28	Did not advance
29	Robert Morgan	Great Britain	457.65	29	Did not advance
30	Abraham Suárez	Ecuador	446.92	30	Did not advance
31	Majed Altaqi	Kuwait	387.60	31	Did not advance
32	Lee Seon-gi	South Korea	362.58	32	Did not advance
33	Christopher Honey	Barbados	347.22	33	Did not advance
34	Tang Kei Shan	Hong Kong	298.08	34	Did not advance
35	Wong Kin Chung	Hong Kong	263.16	35	Did not advance

== Sources ==
- Official Report of the Games of the XXIVth Olympiad Seoul, 1988 - Volume 2: Competition Summary and Results (pdf) (in English and French). Seoul: Seoul Olympic Organizing Committee. 1989. pp. pp. 573–8. OCLC 23924033.
- Crean, John (13 June 1996). "Hong Kong's Last Chance To Win an Olympic Medal". The New York Times.
