= Diving at the 1984 Summer Olympics – Women's 10 metre platform =

Women's 10 metre platform at the Games of the XXIII Olympiad
- Venue: McDonald's Olympic Swim Stadium
- Date: August 9, 1984 (Preliminary); August 10, 1984 (Finals)
- Competitors: 21 from 14 nations
- Winning time: 435.51

Medalists
1st place, gold medalist(s)		Zhou Jihong	China
2nd place, silver medalist(s)		Michele Mitchell	United States
3rd place, bronze medalist(s)		Wendy Wyland	United States

The women's 10 metre platform, also reported as platform diving, was one of four diving events on the Diving at the 1984 Summer Olympics programme.

The competition was split into two phases:

1. Preliminary round (9 August)
  Divers performed eight dives. The twelve divers with the highest scores advanced to the final.
2. Final (10 August)
  Divers performed another set of eight dives and the score here obtained determined the final ranking.

== Results ==
Rank	Diver	Nation	Preliminary		Final
Rank	Diver	Nation	Points	Rank	Points
1st place, gold medalist(s)	Zhou Jihong	China	462.87	1	435.51
2nd place, silver medalist(s)	Michele Mitchell	United States	402.39	3	431.19
3rd place, bronze medalist(s)	Wendy Wyland	United States	376.11	5	422.07
4	Chen Xiaoxia	China	434.88	2	419.76
5	Valerie McFarlane-Beddoe	Australia	382.08	4	388.56
6	Debbie Fuller	Canada	364.11	7	371.49
7	Elsa Tenorio	Mexico	344.70	10	360.45
8	Guadalupe Canseco	Mexico	343.11	11	352.89
9	Yoshino Mobuchi	Japan	348.60	9	349.95
10	Julie Kent	Australia	371.10	6	345.44
11	Kerstin Finke	West Germany	351.45	8	325.47
12	Tine Tollan	Norway	341.31	12	315.72
13	Angela Ribeiro	Brazil	329.31	13	Did not advance
14	Marianne Weinås	Sweden	327.66	14	Did not advance
15	Verónica Ribot	Argentina	324.21	15	Did not advance
16	Elke Heinrichs	West Germany	320.07	16	Did not advance
17	Kathy Kelemen	Canada	313.77	17	Did not advance
18	Carolyn Roscoe	Great Britain	312.39	18	Did not advance
19	Lindsey Fraser	Great Britain	295.86	19	Did not advance
20	Nicole Kreil	Austria	277.92	20	Did not advance
21	Rim Hassan	Egypt	145.94	21	Did not advance

== Sources ==
- Official Report of the Games of the XXIIIrd Olympiad Los Angeles, 1984 - Volume 2: Competition Summary and Results (pdf). Los Angeles: Los Angeles Olympic Organizing Committee. 1985. pp. pp. 520–1. ISBN 0-9614512-0-3. OCLC 12601151.
