= Diving at the 1984 Summer Olympics – Men's 3 metre springboard =

Men's 3 metre springboard at the Games of the XXIII Olympiad
- Venue: McDonald's Olympic Swim Stadium
- Date: August 7, 1984 (preliminary); August 8, 1984 (final)
- Competitors: 30 from 19 nations
- Winning time: 754.41

Medalists
| 1st place, gold medalist(s) | | Greg Louganis | United States |
| 2nd place, silver medalist(s) | | Tan Liangde | China |
| 3rd place, bronze medalist(s) | | Ronald Merriott | United States |

The men's 3 metre springboard, also reported as springboard diving, was one of four diving events on the Diving at the 1984 Summer Olympics programme.

The competition was split into two phases:

1. Preliminary round (7 August)
  Divers performed eleven dives. The twelve divers with the highest scores advanced to the final.
2. Final (8 August)
  Divers performed another set of eleven dives and the score here obtained determined the final ranking.

== Results ==
| Rank | Diver | Nation | Preliminary | | Final |
| Rank | Diver | Nation | Points | Rank | Points |
|---|---|---|---|---|---|
| 1st place, gold medalist(s) | Greg Louganis | United States | 752.37 | 1 | 754.41 |
| 2nd place, silver medalist(s) | Tan Liangde | China | 600.99 | 4 | 662.31 |
| 3rd place, bronze medalist(s) | Ronald Merriott | United States | 628.47 | 2 | 661.32 |
| 4 | Li Hongping | China | 611.55 | 3 | 646.35 |
| 5 | Christopher Snode | Great Britain | 592.68 | 5 | 609.51 |
| 6 | Piero Italiani | Italy | 573.69 | 6 | 578.94 |
| 7 | Albin Killat | West Germany | 549.39 | 8 | 569.52 |
| 8 | Steve Foley | Australia | 543.87 | 9 | 561.93 |
| 9 | Jorge Mondragón | Mexico | 537.03 | 10 | 550.35 |
| 10 | Dieter Dörr | West Germany | 533.61 | 11 | 549.33 |
| 11 | Juha Ovaskainen | Finland | 532.17 | 12 | 548.55 |
| 12 | Carlos Girón | Mexico | 549.75 | 7 | 530.04 |
| 13 | Jon Grunde Vegard | Norway | 531.48 | 13 | Did not advance |
| 14 | Randy Sageman | Canada | 527.97 | 14 | Did not advance |
| 15 | Nigel Stanton | Great Britain | 521.61 | 15 | Did not advance |
| 16 | Tom Lemaire | Belgium | 515.16 | 16 | Did not advance |
| 17 | Ricardo Camacho | Spain | 509.10 | 17 | Did not advance |
| 18 | Mark Graham | New Zealand | 497.55 | 18 | Did not advance |
| 19 | Fernando Henderson | Dominican Republic | 492.15 | 19 | Did not advance |
| 20 | Reynaldo Castro | Dominican Republic | 485.16 | 20 | Did not advance |
| 21 | Carlos Isturiz | Venezuela | 483.00 | 21 | Did not advance |
| 22 | Gary Lamb | New Zealand | 477.66 | 22 | Did not advance |
| 23 | Mike Mourant | Canada | 476.19 | 23 | Did not advance |
| 24 | Andy Kwan | Hong Kong | 433.89 | 24 | Did not advance |
| 25 | Isao Yamagishi | Japan | 427.14 | 25 | Did not advance |
| 26 | Said Daw | Egypt | 407.88 | 26 | Did not advance |
| 27 | Yang Wai Kam | Hong Kong | 387.63 | 27 | Did not advance |
| 28 | Tamer Farid | Egypt | 373.71 | 28 | Did not advance |
| 29 | Abdulla Abuqrais | Kuwait | 312.24 | 29 | Did not advance |
| 30 | Majed Al-Taqi | Kuwait | 299.16 | 30 | Did not advance |

== Sources ==
- Official Report of the Games of the XXIIIrd Olympiad Los Angeles, 1984 - Volume 2: Competition Summary and Results (pdf). Los Angeles: Los Angeles Olympic Organizing Committee. 1985. pp. pp. 522–4. ISBN 0-9614512-0-3. OCLC 12601151.
