= Diving at the 1988 Summer Olympics – Men's 10 metre platform =

Men's 10 metre platform at the Games of the XXIV Olympiad

Medalists
1st place, gold medalist(s)		Greg Louganis	United States
2nd place, silver medalist(s)		Xiong Ni	China
3rd place, bronze medalist(s)		Jesús Mena	Mexico

The men's 10 metre platform, also reported as platform diving, was one of four diving events on the Diving at the 1988 Summer Olympics programme.

The competition was split into two phases:

1. Preliminary round (26 September)
  Divers performed ten dives. The twelve divers with the highest scores advanced to the final.
2. Final (27 September)
  Divers performed another set of ten dives and the score here obtained determined the final ranking.

Days after suffering a concussion during a missed dive in winning the 3 metre springboard event, defending champion Greg Louganis won the fourth gold medal of his Olympic career, scoring a near-perfect 86.70 points on his final dive to win by a narrow margin of 1.14 points.

== Results ==
Rank	Diver	Nation	Preliminary		Final
Rank	Diver	Nation	Points	Rank	Points
1st place, gold medalist(s)	Greg Louganis	United States	617.67	1	638.61
2nd place, silver medalist(s)	Xiong Ni	China	601.50	2	637.47
3rd place, bronze medalist(s)	Jesús Mena	Mexico	523.50	9	594.39
4	Giorgi Chogovadze	Soviet Union	540.90	7	585.96
5	Jan Hempel	East Germany	558.03	5	583.77
6	Li Kongzheng	China	578.31	3	543.81
7	Steffen Haage	East Germany	529.68	8	541.02
8	Vladimir Timoshinin	Soviet Union	570.75	4	534.66
9	Jorge Mondragón	Mexico	518.52	11	511.89
10	Isao Yamagishi	Japan	517.80	12	500.70
11	David Bédard	Canada	524.10	10	499.53
12	Patrick Jeffrey	United States	553.89	6	483.54
13	Albin Killat	West Germany	517.23	13	Did not advance
14	Keita Kaneto	Japan	497.04	14	Did not advance
15	Robert Morgan	Great Britain	489.27	15	Did not advance
16	Domenico Rinaldi	Italy	476.01	16	Did not advance
17	Oscar Bertone	Italy	471.24	17	Did not advance
18	Craig Rogerson	Australia	469.47	18	Did not advance
19	Graeme Banks	Australia	462.87	19	Did not advance
20	Jeffrey Hirst	Canada	453.99	20	Did not advance
21	Jeffrey Arbon	Great Britain	450.18	21	Did not advance
22	Willi Meyer	West Germany	449.07	22	Did not advance
23	Frédéric Pierre	France	437.01	23	Did not advance
24	Tom Lemaire	Belgium	433.68	24	Did not advance
25	Emilio Ratia	Spain	425.73	25	Did not advance
26	Lee Sun-gee	South Korea	420.45	26	Did not advance

== Sources ==
- Official Report of the Games of the XXIVth Olympiad Seoul, 1988 - Volume 2: Competition Summary and Results (pdf) (in English and French). Seoul: Seoul Olympic Organizing Committee. 1989. pp. pp. 578–81. OCLC 23924033.
