= Diving at the 1991 World Aquatics Championships – Men's 3 metre springboard =

The Men's 3m Springboard event was contested for the sixth time at the World Aquatics Championships during the 1991 edition, held in Perth, Western Australia.

The competition was split into two phases: with a preliminary round, where the twelve divers with the highest scores advanced to the final. In the last round the remaining divers performed a set of dives to determine the final ranking. There were a total number of 33 competitors.

== Final ==
| RANK | FINAL | SCORE |
|---|---|---|
| | Kent Ferguson (USA) | 650.25 |
| | Tan Liangde (CHN) | 643.95 |
| | Albin Killat (GER) | 619.77 |
| 4. | Li Deliang (CHN) | 614.73 |
| 5. | Mark Bradshaw (USA) | 610.14 |
| 6. | Sergey Lomonovskiy (URS) | 598.83 |
| 7. | Valery Statsenko (URS) | 577.98 |
| 8. | Edwin Jongejans (NED) | 569.52 |
| 9. | Fernando Platas (MEX) | 565.83 |
| 10. | Simon McCormack (AUS) | 565.14 |
| 11. | Jorge Mondragón (MEX) | 563.10 |
| 12. | Mark Rourke (CAN) | 549.54 |

== Non-Qualifiers ==
| RANK | FINAL | SCORE |
|---|---|---|
| 13. | Joakim Andersson (SWE) | 528.84 |
| 14. | Davide Lorenzini (ITA) | 528.69 |
| 15. | Peter Böhler (GER) | 524.22 |
| 16. | Robert Morgan (GBR) | 513.69 |
| 17. | Michael Murphy (AUS) | 512.73 |
| 18. | Lee Yuan (TPE) | 512.19 |
| 19. | Larry Flewwelling (CAN) | 511.89 |
| 20. | Philippe Duvernay (FRA) | 509.46 |
| 21. | Jérome Nalliod (FRA) | 502.44 |
| 22. | Ole Johnny Aasen (NOR) | 490.44 |
| 23. | José Miguel Gil (ESP) | 490.14 |
| 24. | Niki Stajković (AUT) | 485.34 |
| 25. | Cho Gum-San (PRK) | 463.56 |
| 26. | Jürgen Richter (AUT) | 455.10 |
| 27. | Jeff Arbon (GBR) | 453.96 |
| 28. | Dennis Sörensen (DEN) | 451.56 |
| 29. | Evan Stewart (ZIM) | 436.71 |
| 30. | Temmy Kusuma (INA) | 371.94 |
| 31. | Emerson Neves (BRA) | 370.41 |
| 32. | Regis Carrera (BRA) | 344.19 |
| 33. | Husaini Noor (INA) | 313.02 |

== See also ==
- Diving at the 1988 Summer Olympics
- Diving at the 1992 Summer Olympics
