= Diving at the 1984 Summer Olympics – Men's 10 metre platform =

Men's 10 metre platform at the Games of the XXIII Olympiad
- Venue: McDonald's Olympic Swim Stadium
- Date: August 11, 1984 (preliminary); August 12, 1984 (final)
- Competitors: 26 from 18 nations
- Winning time: 710.91

Medalists
1st place, gold medalist(s)		Greg Louganis	United States
2nd place, silver medalist(s)		Bruce Kimball	United States
3rd place, bronze medalist(s)		Li Kongzheng	China

The men's 10 metre platform, also reported as platform diving, was one of four diving events on the Diving at the 1984 Summer Olympics programme.

The competition was split into two phases:

1. Preliminary round (11 August)
  Divers performed ten dives. The twelve divers with the highest scores advanced to the final.
2. Final (12 August)
  Divers performed another set of ten dives and the score here obtained determined the final ranking.

== Results ==
Rank	Diver	Nation	Preliminary		Final
Rank	Diver	Nation	Points	Rank	Points
1st place, gold medalist(s)	Greg Louganis	United States	688.05	1	710.91
2nd place, silver medalist(s)	Bruce Kimball	United States	602.64	4	643.50
3rd place, bronze medalist(s)	Li Kongzheng	China	615.89	2	638.28
4	Tong Hui	China	608.04	3	604.77
5	Albin Killat	West Germany	542.10	5	551.97
6	Dieter Dörr	West Germany	489.84	9	536.07
7	Christopher Snode	Great Britain	507.96	6	524.40
8	David Bédard	Canada	488.04	11	518.13
9	Steve Foley	Australia	489.21	10	479.43
10	Miguel Ángel Zavala	Mexico	492.24	8	476.82
11	Jon Grunde Vegard	Norway	494.67	7	449.55
12	Mark Rourke	Canada	485.58	12	434.13
13	José Luis Rocha	Mexico	479.67	13	Did not advance
14	Bob Morgan	Great Britain	474.09	14	Did not advance
15	Masashi Nakashima	Japan	466.74	15	Did not advance
16	César Henderson	Dominican Republic	464.52	16	Did not advance
17	Isao Yamagishi	Japan	462.09	17	Did not advance
18	Domenico Rinaldi	Italy	460.80	18	Did not advance
19	Tom Lemaire	Belgium	455.61	19	Did not advance
20	Park Jong-ryong	South Korea	418.98	20	Did not advance
21	Luis Diéguez	Spain	361.23	21	Did not advance
22	Abdulla Abuqrais	Kuwait	342.03	22	Did not advance
23	Said Daw	Egypt	341.07	23	Did not advance
24	Kwan Andy	Hong Kong	324.57	24	Did not advance
25	Alaeddin Soueidan	Syria	317.88	25	Did not advance
26	Amro Hassan	Egypt	316.35	26	Did not advance

== Sources ==
- Official Report of the Games of the XXIIIrd Olympiad Los Angeles, 1984 - Volume 2: Competition Summary and Results (pdf). Los Angeles: Los Angeles Olympic Organizing Committee. 1985. pp. pp. 524–6. ISBN 0-9614512-0-3. OCLC 12601151.
