= Diving at the 1991 World Aquatics Championships – Men's 1 metre springboard =

The Men's 1m Springboard event was contested for the first time at the World Aquatics Championships during the 1991 edition, held in Perth, Western Australia.

The competition was split into two phases, with a preliminary round, where the twelve divers with the highest scores advanced to the final. In the last round divers perform a set of dives to determine the final ranking.

== Final - Men 1m Springboard ==
RANK	FINAL	SCORE
	Edwin Jongejans (NED)	588.51
	Mark Lenzi (USA)	578.22
	Wang Yijie (CHN)	577.86
4.	Peter Böhler (GER)	547.98
5.	Mark Bradshaw (USA)	544.56
6.	Jorge Mondragón (MEX)	543.09
7.	Sergey Lomonovskiy (URS)	528.18
8.	Simon McCormack (AUS)	519.21
9.	Tan Liangde (CHN)	508.77
10.	Valery Statsenko (URS)	501.66
11.	Russell Butler (AUS)	492.39
12.	Davide Lorenzini (ITA)	478.95

== Preliminary - Men 1m Springboard ==
Rank	Family name	First name	Country	Total Points	Qualified status
1	JONGEJANS	Edwin	NED	573.78	Q
2	WANG	Yijie	CHN	571.11	Q
3	TAN	Liangde	CHN	563.34	Q
4	LENZI	Mark	USA	555.90	Q
5	ANDERSSON	Joakim	SWE	544.32	
6	BRADSHAW	Mark	USA	543.81	Q
7	BOHLER	Peter	GER	532.02	Q
8	MONDRAGON	Jorge	MEX	521.76	Q
9	LOMANOVSKY	Sergey	URS	517.71	Q
10	STATSENKO	Valery	URS	506.04	Q
11	LORENZINI	Davide	ITA	505.44	Q
12	MCCORMACK	Simon	AUS	499.47	Q
13	BUTLER	Russell	AUS	494.94	Q
14	RAMIREZ	Abel	CUB	486.96	
15	BEDARD	David	CAN	478.68	
16	PUNZEL	Rainer	GER	478.62	
17	MORGAN	Bob	GBR	468.54	
18	AASEN	Ole Johnny	NOR	467.37	
19	FLEWWELLING	Larry	CAN	466.56	
20	DUVERNAY	Philippe	FRA	459.36	
21	PLATAS	Fernando	MEX	458.13	
22	LEE	Yuan-Ming	TPE	458.07	
23	ALVAREZ	Rafael	ESP	457.92	
24	DE BOTTON	Alessandro	ITA	453.75	
25	GIL	Jose Miguel	ESP	448.74	
26	SORENSEN	Dennis	DEN	431.78	
27	NALLIOD	Jerome	FRA	416.79	
28	ARBON	Jeff	GBR	403.35	
29	STEWART	Evan	ZIM	401.51	
30	CHOE	Gum-San	PRK	396.00	
31	NEVES	Emerson	BRA	389.13	
32	NOOR	Husaini	INA	305.34	
33	KUSUMA	Temmy	INA	267.48	

== See also ==
- Diving at the 1988 Summer Olympics
- Diving at the 1992 Summer Olympics
