= Diving at the Summer World University Games =

Athletic competition event

- Events: 13 (men: 6; women: 6; mixed: 1)

Games
- 1959; 1960; 1961; 1962; 1963; 1964; 1965; 1966; 1967; 1968; 1970; 1970; 1973; 1972; 1975; 1975; 1977; 1978; 1979; 1981; 1983; 1985; 1987; 1989; 1991; 1993; 1995; 1997; 1999; 2001; 2003; 2005; 2007; 2009; 2011; 2013; 2015; 2017; 2019; 2021; 2025

Diving has been one of the compulsory sports at the Summer World University Games since its inception at the 1961 Summer Universiade held in Sofia, Bulgaria. However, the sport was not present in the 1975 and 1989 editions.

== Summary ==
Games	Year	Host city	Host country	Winner	Second	Third
II	1961	Sofia	Bulgaria	Great Britain	Japan	West Germany
III	1963	Porto Alegre	Brazil	West Germany	Japan	Brazil
IV	1965	Budapest	Hungary	United States	Poland	United Kingdom
V	1967	Tokyo	Japan	United States	Japan	Mexico
VI	1970	Turin	Italy	Soviet Union	Italy	United States
VII	1973	Moscow	Soviet Union	Soviet Union	Czechoslovakia	United States
IX	1977	Sofia	Bulgaria	Soviet Union	United States	Cuba
X	1979	Mexico City	Mexico	Soviet Union	China	Cuba
XI	1981	Bucharest	Romania	China	Soviet Union	United States
XII	1983	Edmonton	Canada	China	United States	Soviet Union
XIII	1985	Kobe	Japan	China	United States	Soviet Union
XIV	1985	Zagreb	Yugoslavia	China	United States	Soviet Union
XVI	1991	Sheffield	Great Britain	China	North Korea	United States
XVII	1993	Buffalo	United States	China	Canada	Germany
XVIII	1995	Fukuoka	Japan	China	Germany	United States
XIX	1997	Messina	Italy	China	Hungary	United States
XX	1999	Palma	Spain	China	Russia	Cuba
XXI	2001	Beijing	China	China	Mexico	Ukraine
XXII	2003	Daegu	South Korea	China	North Korea	Mexico
XXIII	2005	İzmir	Turkey	China	Mexico	Russia
XXVIV	2007	Bangkok	Thailand	China	Mexico	Russia
XXV	2009	Belgrade	Serbia	China	Mexico	Russia
XXVI	2011	Shenzhen	China	China	Mexico	Russia
XXVII	2013	Kazan	Russia	China	Russia	Australia
XXVIII	2015	Gwangju	South Korea	China	Russia	Canada
XXIX	2017	Taipei	Taiwan	North Korea	Russia	Mexico
XXX	2019	Naples	Italy	China	Mexico	Russia
XXXI	2021	Chengdu	China	China	South Korea	Japan
XXXII	2025	Berlin	Germany	China	Germany	United States

== Events ==
Event	61	63	65	67	70	73	77	79	81	83	85	87	91	93	95	97	99	01	03	05	07	09	11	13	15	17	19	21	Years
Men's 10 m platform	•	•	•	•	•	•	•	•	•	•	•	•	•	•	•	•	•	•	•	•	•	•	•	•	•	•	•	•	28
Men's 3 m springboard	•	•	•	•	•	•	•	•	•	•	•	•	•	•	•	•	•	•	•	•	•	•	•	•	•	•	•	•	28
Women's 10 m platform	•	•	•	•	•	•	•	•	•	•	•	•	•	•	•	•	•	•	•	•	•	•	•	•	•	•	•	•	28
Women's 3 m springboard	•	•	•	•	•	•	•	•	•	•	•	•	•	•	•	•	•	•	•	•	•	•	•	•	•	•	•	•	28
Men's 1 m springboard													•	•	•	•	•	•	•	•	•	•	•	•	•	•	•	•	16
Women's 1 m springboard													•	•	•	•	•	•	•	•	•	•	•	•	•	•	•	•	16
Men's 3 m synchronized springboard																		•	•	•	•	•	•	•	•	•	•	•	11
Women's 3 m synchronized springboard																		•	•	•	•	•	•	•	•	•	•	•	11
Men's 10 m synchronized platform																		•	•	•	•	•	•	•	•	•	•	•	11
Women's 10 m synchronized platform																		•	•	•	•	•	•	•	•	•	•	•	11
Mixed's 3 m synchronized springboard																										•	•	•	3
Mixed's 10 m synchronized platform																										•	•	•	3
Men's teams											•	•	•	•	•	•	•	•	•	•	•	•	•	•	•	•	•	•	18
Women's teams											•	•	•	•	•	•	•	•	•	•	•	•	•	•	•	•	•	•	18
Mixed team																									•	•	•	•	4

== Medal table ==
Last updated after the 2025 Summer World University Games

Rank	Nation	Gold	Silver	Bronze	Total
1	China (CHN)	159	74	32	265
2	Mexico (MEX)	17	31	20	68
3	Russia (RUS)	13	20	20	53
4	United States (USA)	12	36	50	98
5	Soviet Union (URS)	12	13	11	36
6	Germany (GER)	6	10	12	28
7	North Korea (PRK)	6	8	7	21
8	Japan (JPN)	5	4	14	23
9	Ukraine (UKR)	3	7	10	20
10	Great Britain (GBR)	3	1	1	5
11	Italy (ITA)	3	0	7	10
12	Canada (CAN)	2	6	11	19
13	West Germany (FRG)	2	6	0	8
14	Hungary (HUN)	2	0	2	4
15	South Korea (KOR)	1	16	21	38
16	Cuba (CUB)	1	5	3	9
17	Australia (AUS)	1	2	4	7
18	Poland (POL)	1	1	3	5
19	Czechoslovakia (TCH)	1	1	0	2
20	Brazil (BRA)	0	2	6	8
21	Malaysia (MAS)	0	2	2	4
22	Austria (AUT)	0	1	2	3
23	Spain (ESP)	0	1	1	2
24	France (FRA)	0	1	0	1
24	Kazakhstan (KAZ)	0	1	0	1
26	Romania (ROM)	0	0	3	3
27	Bulgaria (BUL)	0	0	1	1
27	East Germany (GDR)	0	0	1	1
27	Georgia (GEO)	0	0	1	1
27	Romania (ROU)	0	0	1	1
27	Sweden (SWE)	0	0	1	1
Totals (31 entries)		250	249	247	746
