= Mabuchi =

Mabuchi (written: 馬渕 or 馬淵) is a Japanese surname. Notable people with the surname include:

- Choko Mabuchi (馬淵 テフ子, 1911-1985), Japanese aviator
- Eitaro Mabuchi (馬淵 鋭太郎, 1867–1943), Japanese politician
- Erika Mabuchi (馬渕 英里何, born 1979), Japanese actress
- Hideo Mabuchi (born 1971), American physicist
- Kanoko Tsutani-Mabuchi (津谷-馬淵 鹿乃子, born 1938), Japanese Olympic diver
- Kaoru Mabuchi, pen name of the Japanese screenwriter Takeshi Kimura (1912–1988)
- Brothers Kenichi and Takaichi Mabuchi, founders of Mabuchi Motor company
- Ryo Mabuchi (馬淵 良, born 1933), Japanese Olympic diver, husband of Kanoko
- Satoko Mabuchi (馬渕 智子, born 1982), Japanese softball player
- Toshiki Mabuchi (born 1950), Japanese mathematician
- Sumio Mabuchi (馬淵 澄夫, born 1960), Japanese politician
- Yoshino Mabuchi (馬淵 よしの, born 1966), Japanese Olympic diver, daughter of Kanoko and Ryo

== See also ==
- Kamo no Mabuchi (賀茂 真淵, 1697–1769), Japanese poet and philologist
- Mabuchi Motor, a Japanese manufacturing company
