= Diving at the 1984 Summer Olympics – Women's 3 metre springboard =

Women's 3m Springboard at the Games of the XXIII Olympiad
- Venue: McDonald's Olympic Swim Stadium
- Date: August 5, 1984 (preliminary); August 6, 1984 (final)
- Competitors: 24 from 18 nations
- Winning time: 530.70

Medalists
1st place, gold medalist(s)		Sylvie Bernier	Canada
2nd place, silver medalist(s)		Kelly McCormick	United States
3rd place, bronze medalist(s)		Christina Seufert	United States

The women's 3m springboard event at the 1984 Summer Olympics was held 5–6 August 1984, at Olympic Swim Stadium in Los Angeles, California, United States. It was one of four diving events at the Games.

== Competition format ==
The competition was split into two phases:

1. Preliminary round (5 August)
  Divers performed ten dives. The twelve divers with the highest scores advanced to the final.
2. Final (6 August)
  Divers performed another set of ten dives and the score here obtained determined the final ranking.

== Schedule ==
All times are Pacific Time Zone (UTC–7)

Date	Time	Round
Sunday, August 5, 1984	10:00	Preliminary
Monday, August 6 2021	16:30	Final

== Results ==
Rank	Diver	Nation	Preliminary		Final
Rank	Diver	Nation	Points	Rank	Points
1st place, gold medalist(s)	Sylvie Bernier	Canada	489.51	3	530.70
2nd place, silver medalist(s)	Kelly McCormick	United States	516.75	2	527.46
3rd place, bronze medalist(s)	Christina Seufert	United States	481.41	5	517.62
4	Li Yihua	China	517.92	1	506.52
5	Li Qiaoxian	China	466.83	6	487.68
6	Elsa Tenorio	Mexico	460.56	8	463.56
7	Lesley Smith	Zimbabwe	438.72	10	451.89
8	Debbie Fuller	Canada	437.04	11	450.99
9	Jennifer Donnet	Australia	432.78	12	443.13
10	Daphne Jongejans	Netherlands	487.95	4	437.40
11	Anita Rossing-Brown	Sweden	464.58	7	424.98
12	Verónica Ribot	Argentina	443.25	9	422.52
13	Ann Fargher	New Zealand	421.65	13	Did not advance
14	Tine Tollan	Norway	419.55	14	Did not advance
15	Antonette Wilken	Zimbabwe	414.66	15	Did not advance
16	Guadalupe Canseco	Mexico	411.96	16	Did not advance
17	Claire Izacard	France	403.17	17	Did not advance
18	Valerie McFarlane-Beddoe	Australia	401.13	18	Did not advance
19	Alison Childs	Great Britain	400.68	19	Did not advance
20	Kerstin Finke	West Germany	393.93	20	Did not advance
21	Nicole Kreil	Austria	382.68	21	Did not advance
22	Joana Figueiredo	Portugal	374.07	22	Did not advance
23	Ângela Mendonça Ribeiro	Brazil	370.68	23	Did not advance
24	Rim Hassan	Egypt	258.63	24	Did not advance
