= Diving at the 1986 World Aquatics Championships =

The 1986 World Aquatics Championships place in Madrid, Spain.

== Medal table ==
Rank	Nation	Gold	Silver	Bronze	Total
1	China (CHN)	2	4	1	7
2	United States (USA)	2	0	2	4
3	Soviet Union (URS)	0	0	1	1
Totals (3 entries)		4	4	4	12

== Medal summary ==
=== Men ===
Event	Gold	Silver	Bronze
3 m springboard	Greg Louganis (USA); 750.06	Tan Liangde (CHN); 692.28	Li Hongping (CHN); 642.06
10 m platform	Greg Louganis (USA); 668.58	Li Kongzheng (CHN); 624.33	Bruce Kimball (USA); 599.91

=== Women ===
Event	Gold	Silver	Bronze
3 m springboard	Gao Min (CHN); 582.90	Li Yihua (CHN); 549.42	Marina Babkova (URS); 525.21
10 m platform	Chen Lin (CHN); 449.67	Lü Wei (CHN); 422.25	Wendy Wyland (USA); 412.47
