= Kumiko Watanabe (disambiguation) =

Kumiko Watanabe (born 1965) is a Japanese voice actress.

Kumiko Watanabe may refer to:

- Kumiko Watanabe (born 1965), Japanese voice actress known better as Kumiko Nishihara
- Kumiko Watanabe, Japanese Olympic diver.
