= Diving at the 1991 Summer Universiade =

The Diving competition in the 1991 Summer Universiade was held in Sheffield, United Kingdom.

== Medal overview ==
Event	Gold	Silver	Bronze
Men's 1-Meter Springboard	Lan Wei (CHN)	Dean Panaro (USA)	Simon McCormack (AUS)
Men's 3-Meter Springboard	Li Deliang (CHN)	Dean Panaro (USA)	Chen Shaoling (CHN)
Men's Platform	Wu Feilong (CHN)	Jesús Mena (MEX)	Scott Donie (USA)
Men's Team	China (CHN)	United States (USA)	Canada (CAN)
Women's 1-Meter Springboard	Yu Xiaoling (CHN)	Brita Baldus (GER)	Xiao Yanjuan (CHN)
Women's 3-Meter Springboard	Gao Min (CHN)	Brita Baldus (GER)	Bei Deng (CHN)
Women's Platform	Kim Hye-Ok (PRK)	Yang Yan (CHN)	Ryu Un-Sil (PRK)
Women's Team	China (CHN)	Canada (CAN)	United States (USA)

== Medal table ==
Rank	Nation	Gold	Silver	Bronze	Total
1	China (CHN)	7	1	3	11
2	North Korea (PRK)	1	0	1	2
3	United States (USA)	0	3	2	5
4	Germany (GER)	0	2	0	2
5	Canada (CAN)	0	1	1	2
6	Mexico (MEX)	0	1	0	1
7	Australia (AUS)	0	0	1	1
Totals (7 entries)		8	8	8	24

Men's 1-Meter Springboard

Rank	Diver	Nation	Points
1st place, gold medalist(s)	Lan Wei	China	377.64
2nd place, silver medalist(s)	Dean Panaro	United States	376.32
3rd place, bronze medalist(s)	Simon McCormack	Australia	334.83

Men's 3-Meter Springboard

Rank	Diver	Nation	Points
1st place, gold medalist(s)	Li Deliang	China	659.70
2nd place, silver medalist(s)	Dean Panaro	United States	637.17
3rd place, bronze medalist(s)	Chen Shaoliang	United States	607.35
4	Russell Butler	Australia	570.00
5	Keita Kaneto	Japan	562.38
6	Simon McCormack	Australia	561.27
7	Jesús Mena	Mexico	558.48
8	Rainer Punzel	Germany	556.50

Men's Platform

Rank	Diver	Nation	Points
1st place, gold medalist(s)	Wu Feilong	China	576.90
2nd place, silver medalist(s)	Jesús Mena	Mexico	575.13
3rd place, bronze medalist(s)	Scott Donie	United States	569.61
4	Edward Morse	United States	555.30
5	Yujie Wang	China	552.30
6	Bruno Fournier	Canada	547.86
7	Keita Kaneto	Japan	513.45
8	Frédéric Pierre	France	501.06

Women's 1-Meter Springboard

Rank	Diver	Nation	Points
1st place, gold medalist(s)	Yu Xiaoling	China	270.66
2nd place, silver medalist(s)	Brita Baldus	Germany	255.78
3rd place, bronze medalist(s)	Annie Pelletier	Canada	221.76

Women's Platform

Rank	Diver	Nation	Points
1st place, gold medalist(s)	Kim Hye-Ok	North Korea	452.16
2nd place, silver medalist(s)	Yang Yan	China	424.71
3rd place, bronze medalist(s)	Ryu Un-Sil	North Korea	405.84
4	Eileen Richetelli	United States	397.02
5	K. Vrooman	Canada	391.23
6	Qin Ying	China	378.39
7	Darcy Dominick	United States	375.00
8	Paige Gordon	Canada	372.78
