= Embro =

Embro may refer to:

- Embro, an alternate name for Edinburgh
- Embro, Ontario, a community in the township of Zorra, Ontario

== See also ==
- Embryo
