= Istúriz =

Istúriz is a surname. Notable people with the surname include:

- Antonio López-Istúriz White (born 1970), Spanish politician
- Aristóbulo Istúriz Almeida (1946–2021), Venezuelan politician and academic
- Carlos Isturiz (born 1960), Venezuelan diver
- Francisco Javier de Istúriz y Montero (1785–1871), Spanish politician and diplomat
- Ramón Echarren Istúriz (1929–2014), Spanish Roman Catholic bishop
