= Diving at the Friendship Games =

Diving at the Friendship Games took place in Budapest, Hungary between 16 and 19 August 1984. 4 events (2 men's and 2 women's) were contested.

== Medal summary ==
=== Men's events ===
Event	Gold		Silver		Bronze	
Springboard diving	Aleksandr Portnov (URS)	697.50 points	Dieter Waskow (GDR)	668.91 points	Sergey Kuzmin (URS)	655.71 points
Platform diving	Dieter Waskow (GDR)	659.76 points	Thomas Knuths (GDR)	649.95 points	David Ambartsumyan (URS)	645.78 points

=== Women's events ===
Event	Gold		Silver		Bronze	
Springboard diving	Brita Baldus (GDR)	525.15 points	Zhanna Cyrulnikova (URS)	513.52 points	Tatyana Alyabyeva (URS)	492.21 points
Platform diving	Alla Lobankina (URS)	483.13 points	Ramona Wenzel (GDR)	447.60 points	Anzhela Stasyulevich (URS)	446.10 points

== Medal table ==
Rank	Nation	Gold	Silver	Bronze	Total
1	East Germany (GDR)	2	3	0	5
2	Soviet Union (URS)	2	1	4	7
Totals (2 entries)		4	4	4	12

== See also ==
- Diving at the 1984 Summer Olympics
