= Diving at the 1982 Asian Games =

- Venue: Talkatora Swimming Pool
- Dates: 24–29 November 1982

Diving was contested at the 1982 Asian Games in Talkatora Swimming Pool, New Delhi, India from 24 November to 29 November 1982.

== Medalists ==
=== Men ===
Event	Gold	Silver	Bronze
3 m springboard	Li Kongzheng; China	Tan Liangde; China	Masashi Nakashima; Japan
10 m platform	Tong Hui; China	Zhang Ting; China	Masashi Nakashima; Japan

=== Women ===
Event	Gold	Silver	Bronze
3 m springboard	Li Yihua; China	Yan Shuping; China	Yoshino Mabuchi; Japan
10 m platform	Lü Wei; China	Zhou Jihong; China	Yoshino Mabuchi; Japan

== Medal table ==
Rank	Nation	Gold	Silver	Bronze	Total
1	China (CHN)	4	4	0	8
2	Japan (JPN)	0	0	4	4
Totals (2 entries)		4	4	4	12
