= Graeme Morris =

Graeme Morris may refer to:

- Graeme Morris (cricketer)
- Graeme Morris (game designer)

== See also ==
- Grahame Morris, British politician
- Graham Morris, British diver
