= Alaeddin Soueidan =

Syrian diver

Personal information
- Nationality: Syrian
- Born: 12 December 1970 (age 54)

Sport
- Sport: Diving

Alaeddin Soueidan (born 12 December 1970) is a Syrian diver. He competed in the men's 10 metre platform event at the 1984 Summer Olympics.
