= Li Qing (diver) =

Chinese diver

Personal information
- Nationality: China
- Born: December 1, 1972 (age 53) Yingcheng, Hubei

Sport
- Sport: Diving
- Event: 3 m
Medal record
Event	1st	2nd	3rd
Olympic Games	0	1	0
Summer Universiade	1	0	0
Women's diving
Representing China
Olympic Games
Silver medal – second place	1988 Seoul	3 m springboard
Summer Universiade
Gold medal – first place	1987 Zagreb	3 m springboard

Li Qing (Chinese: 李青; pinyin: Lǐ Qīng; born December 1, 1972) is a female Chinese diver. She competed at 1988 Seoul Olympic Games, and won a silver medal in the women's 3 m springboard.

Li is married to Tan Liangde, also a famous Chinese diver and Olympic medalist. They have a daughter. The Olympic champion, Hu Jia, is their student.
