= Fernando Henderson =

Dominican Republic diver

Personal information
- Nationality: Dominican

Sport
- Sport: Diving

Fernando Henderson is a Dominican Republic diver. He competed in the men's 3 metre springboard event at the 1984 Summer Olympics.
