= Luis Diéguez =

Spanish diver

Personal information
- Nationality: Spanish
- Born: 3 October 1966 (age 58); Madrid, Spain

Sport
- Sport: Diving

Luis Diéguez (born 3 October 1966) is a Spanish diver. He competed in the men's 10 metre platform event at the 1984 Summer Olympics.
