= Abraham Suárez =

Ecuadorian diver

Personal information
- Nationality: Ecuadorian
- Born: 8 April 1968 (age 56)

Sport
- Sport: Diving

Abraham Suárez (born 8 April 1968) is an Ecuadorian diver. He competed in the men's 3 metre springboard event at the 1988 Summer Olympics.
