= Park Jong-ryong =

South Korean diver

Personal information
- Nationality: South Korean
- Born: 12 February 1962 (age 63)

Sport
- Sport: Diving

Park Jong-ryong (born 12 February 1962) is a South Korean diver. He competed in the men's 10 metre platform event at the 1984 Summer Olympics.
