= Chen Lin (diver) =

Chinese diver

Personal information
- Native name: 陈琳
- Nationality: Chinese
- Born: China

Sport
- Country: China
- Sport: Diving
- Event: 10 m
Medal record
World Championships
Gold medal – first place	1986 Madrid	10 m

Chen Lin (simplified Chinese: 陈琳; traditional Chinese: 陳琳; pinyin: Chén Lín) is a former female Chinese diver specializing in 10 metre platform event. She was the gold medalist at 1986 World Championships in Madrid, Spain, and became the first Chinese world champion in diving. Since retiring from a diver in 1990s, she has been working as a coach. In Beijing, she trained divers such as Li Na. She is currently a coach of Crystal Palace Diving in London.
