= Tang Kei Shan =

Hong Kong diver

Personal information
- Nationality: Hong Konger
- Born: 4 November 1961 (age 63)

Sport
- Sport: Diving

Tang Kei Shan (born 4 November 1961) is a Hong Kong diver. He competed in the men's 3 metre springboard event at the 1988 Summer Olympics.
