= Claire Izacard =

French diver

Personal information
- Nationality: French
- Born: 23 September 1964 (age 60)

Sport
- Sport: Diving

Claire Izacard (born 23 September 1964) is a French diver. She competed in the women's 3 metre springboard event at the 1984 Summer Olympics.
