= César Henderson =

Dominican Republic diver

Personal information
- Nationality: Dominican
- Born: 13 September 1959 (age 65); Santo Domingo
- Home town: Brossard, Quebec Canada

Sport
- Sport: Diving

César Henderson (born 13 September 1959) is a Dominican Republic diver and diving coach, now living in Brossard, Quebec, Canada.

For safety reasons Henderson started with swimming at request of his baseball coach. At the swimming pool he was recruited for a training camp and so he started diving.

He won the gold medal at the 1977 Central America and Caribbean Aquatics Championships by age group. He competed in the men's 10 metre platform event at the 1984 Summer Olympics. He also participated at the 1979 and 1983 Pan American Games and at the 1982 World Aquatics Championships.

After becoming diving coach in the Dominican Republic in 1976, he became head coach of the Dominican Republic’s national team in 1985. He moved to Canada in 1987 where he became head coach of Edmonton’s Kinsman Diving Club. Later he joined CAMO as an assistant coach and is still working for CAMO. Since 2015, Henderson works out of the Institut national du Sport in Montreal. He was part of the Canadian coaching staff at the 2000, 2004, 2008, 2012 and 2016 Summer Olympics, and every world championships since 2003.

Henderson was named 2001 Aquatics Athlete of the Century by the Dominican Republic Olympic Committee. He is named Canadian Coach of the Year almost 20 times.
