= Mike Mourant =

Canadian diver

Personal information
- Born: 21 July 1962 (age 63) Winnipeg, Manitoba, Canada

Sport
- Sport: Diving

Mike Mourant (born 21 July 1962) is a Canadian diver. He competed in the men's 3 metre springboard event at the 1984 Summer Olympics.
