= Tomasz Rossa =

Polish diver (born 1967)

Personal information
- Nationality: Polish
- Born: 5 April 1967 (age 58) Warsaw, Poland

Sport
- Sport: Diving

Tomasz Rossa (born 5 April 1967) is a Polish diver. He competed in the men's 3 metre springboard event at the 1988 Summer Olympics.
