= Tamer Farid =

Egyptian diver

Personal information
- Nationality: Egyptian
- Born: 10 August 1968 (age 56)

Sport
- Sport: Diving

Tamer Farid (born 10 August 1968) is an Egyptian diver. He competed in the men's 3 metre springboard event at the 1984 Summer Olympics.
