= Emilio Ratia =

Spanish diver

Personal information
- Nationality: Spanish
- Born: 10 March 1968 (age 57)

Sport
- Sport: Diving

Emilio Ratia (born 10 March 1968) is a Spanish diver. He competed in the men's 10 metre platform event at the 1988 Summer Olympics.
