= Diving at the 1978 Asian Games =

- Venue: Kasetsart University
- Dates: 12–16 December 1978

Diving was contested at the 1978 Asian Games in Bangkok, Thailand.

== Medalists ==
=== Men ===
Event	Gold	Silver	Bronze
3 m springboard	Wu Guocun; China	Li Kongzheng; China	Taizo Kawanami; Japan
10 m platform	Liu Henglin; China	Li Hongping; China	Taizo Kawanami; Japan

=== Women ===
Event	Gold	Silver	Bronze
3 m springboard	Shi Meiqin; China	Peng Yuanchun; China	Rikiko Yamanaka; Japan
10 m platform	Chen Xiaoxia; China	You Jianli; China	Rikiko Yamanaka; Japan

== Medal table ==
Rank	Nation	Gold	Silver	Bronze	Total
1	China (CHN)	4	4	0	8
2	Japan (JPN)	0	0	4	4
Totals (2 entries)		4	4	4	12
