= Erich Pils =

Austrian diver

Personal information
- Nationality: Austrian
- Born: 30 December 1965 (age 59); Wilhelmsburg, Austria

Sport
- Sport: Diving

Erich Pils (born 30 December 1965) is an Austrian diver. He competed in the men's 3 metre springboard event at the 1988 Summer Olympics.
