= Masako Asada =

Japanese diver (born 1971)

Personal information
- Nationality: Japanese
- Born: 8 January 1971 (age 55) Nomi, Japan

Sport
- Sport: Diving
Medal record
Representing Japan
Asian Games
Bronze medal – third place	1990 Beijing	Team

Masako Asada (浅田雅子, Asada Masako; born 8 January 1971) is a Japanese diver. She competed in two events at the 1988 Summer Olympics.
