= Jérôme Nalliod =

French diver

Personal information
- Nationality: French
- Born: 29 July 1966 (age 59) Lyon, France

Sport
- Sport: Diving
Medal record
Representing France
Mediterranean Games
Bronze medal – third place	1987 Latakia	3m springboard

Jérôme Nalliod (born 29 July 1966) is a French diver. He competed in the men's 3 metre springboard event at the 1988 Summer Olympics.
