= Marianne Weinås =

Swedish diver

Personal information
- Nationality: Swedish
- Born: 27 March 1963 (age 62); Gothenburg, Sweden

Sport
- Sport: Diving

Marianne Weinås (born 27 March 1963) is a Swedish former diver. She competed in the women's 10 metre platform event at the 1984 Summer Olympics.
