= Ryu Un-sil =

North Korean diver

Personal information
- Nationality: North Korean
- Born: 3 January 1973 (age 53)

Sport
- Sport: Diving
Medal record
Women's diving
Representing North Korea
Universiade
Bronze medal – third place	1991 Sheffield	Platform

Ryu Un-sil (born 3 January 1973) is a North Korean diver. She competed in the women's 10 metre platform event at the 1992 Summer Olympics.
