= Simon Latimer =

New Zealand sportsperson

Simon James Latimer
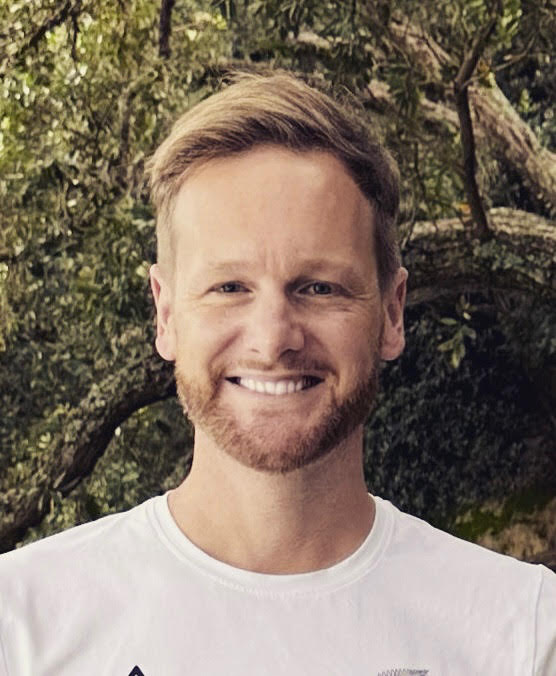

Personal information
- Citizenship: New Zealand, Ukraine
- Born: 4 November 1981 (age 44) Dunedin, New Zealand
- Height: 184 cm (6 ft 0 in)

Sport
- Country: New Zealand
- Sport: Diving, High Diving

Simon James Latimer OLY (born 4 November 1981) is a former New Zealand champion and Olympic representative in springboard and platform diving. Latimer is also a three time Olympic diving judge and referee having officiated in London 2012, Rio 2016 and Tokyo 2020. He also represented New Zealand at three consecutive Commonwealth Games from 2010 to 2018. In 2015, Latimer was the recipient of a Prime Minister's Scholarship for service to sport. Latimer was previously a member of FINA's Technical Diving Committee between 2017 and 2022, and specialized in the psychology of judging diving. He is currently a judge on the Red Bull Cliff Diving World Series since 2020.

In December 2021 Latimer wrote a formal whistleblower complaint to the World Aquatics (previously FINA) Chief Executive Brent Nowicki accusing World Aquatics' Vice President, Zhou Jihong from China, of unethical behavior. Latimer alleged that Zhou manipulated judging panels in favor of China and bullied judges in the diving events at the 2020 Tokyo Olympic Games. Zhou was subsequently ordered by World Aquatics' Ethics Panel to apologise for her behaviour in writing and a recommendation was made to disestablish her position.

Latimer also claimed that Zhou's unethical behavior extended to coaching Chinese divers at the 2020 Olympic Games while concurrently a World Aquatics Vice President and this was corroborated by video evidence. In 2022, World Aquatics' By Laws were updated to state that the Bureau Liaison position that Zhou holds should not interfere on the field of play during competitions and that individuals holding that position shall not act as a Team Leader or coach at international events including the Olympic Games.

Latimer has held senior roles in relation to United Nations Human Rights Conventions in New Zealand. He was previously a Senior Advisor under the United Nations Convention on the Rights of Persons with Disabilities. In 2023 he became the Principal Inspector under the United Nations Optional Protocol to the Convention Against Torture and other Cruel, Inhuman or Degrading Treatment or Punishment. Latimer has also been an advocate for health and disability initiatives in New Zealand, including fronting a campaign for social change through sport, and education around safe sexual health practices.

As of 2022, Latimer is a Life Member of Diving New Zealand.
