= José Luis Rocha =

Mexican diver

Personal information
- Born: 1966 (age 59–60) Mexico City, Mexico

Sport
- Sport: Diving
- College team: Auburn Tigers
Medal record
Representing Mexico
Pan American Games
Bronze medal – third place	1987 Indianapolis	3m springboard

José Luis Rocha represented México in the 1984 Olympic Games in Diving. He attended Auburn University where he was a member of the Swimming and Diving Teams from 1986 to 1989. Rocha was named "an All-American" each of his years at Auburn University, and won the 1987 National Collegiate Athletic Association (NCAA) National Championship on the 1-meter event.

He graduated from Auburn in 1989 with a bachelor's degree in Criminal Justice and moved to South Florida where he married U.S. Olympic diver and double Olympic silver medalist, Michele Mitchell, and became a US Citizen. Rocha worked as a police officer with the Delray Beach Police Department in Palm Beach County, and later moved with his family to Tucson, Arizona where he also served as a police officer. Michele Mitchell and Jose Luis Rocha were divorced in 2006 and Rocha moved to Austin, Texas where he worked as a Private Investigator. He joined the United States Army in 2007, and has deployed twice in support of Operation Iraqi Freedom and Operation New Dawn.
