= Gary Lamb =

New Zealand diver (born 1961)

Personal information
- Nationality: New Zealand
- Born: 20 May 1961 (age 65) Dunedin, New Zealand

Sport
- Sport: Diving

Gary Lamb (born 20 May 1961) is a New Zealand diver. He competed in the men's 3 metre springboard event at the 1984 Summer Olympics.
