= Zhanna Tsyrulnikova =

Soviet diver

Personal information
- Nationality: Soviet
- Born: 26 March 1962 (age 64) Kyiv, Ukraine

Sport
- Sport: Diving
Medal record
Women's diving
Representing Soviet Union
European Championships
Gold medal – first place	1981 Split	3 m springboard
Gold medal – first place	1985 Sofia	3 m springboard
Summer Universiade
Gold medal – first place	1985 Kobe	3 m springboard

Zhanna Tsyrulnikova (born 26 March 1962) is a Soviet diver. She competed in the women's 3 metre springboard event at the 1980 Summer Olympics.
