= Amro Hassan =

Egyptian diver

Personal information
- Nationality: Egyptian
- Born: 17 February 1968 (age 57)

Sport
- Sport: Diving

Amro Hassan (born 17 February 1968) is an Egyptian diver. He competed in the men's 10 metre platform event at the 1984 Summer Olympics.
