= Lesley Smith (diver) =

Zimbabwean diver (born 1957)

Personal information
- Nationality: Zimbabwean
- Born: 26 March 1957 (age 68)

Sport
- Sport: Diving

Lesley Smith (born 26 March 1957) is a Zimbabwean diver. She competed in the women's 3 metre springboard event at the 1984 Summer Olympics.
