= Miguel Ángel Zavala =

Mexican diver

Personal information
- Nationality: Mexican
- Born: 13 April 1961 (age 63)

Sport
- Sport: Diving

Miguel Ángel Zavala (born 13 April 1961) is a Mexican diver. He competed in the men's 10 metre platform event at the 1984 Summer Olympics.
