= Yang Wai Kam =

Hong Kong diver

Personal information
- Nationality: Hong Konger
- Born: 23 June 1964 (age 60)

Sport
- Sport: Diving

Yang Wai Kam (born 23 June 1964) is a Hong Kong diver. He competed in the men's 3 metre springboard event at the 1984 Summer Olympics.
