= Randy Sageman =

Canadian diver

Personal information
- Born: 9 April 1960 (age 65) Thamesford, Ontario, Canada

Sport
- Sport: Diving

Randy Sageman (born 9 April 1960) is a Canadian diver. He competed in the men's 3 metre springboard event at the 1984 Summer Olympics.
