= Oscar Bertone =

Italian diver (born 1967)

Personal information
- Nationality: Italian
- Born: 14 October 1967 (age 58) Fossano, Italy

Sport
- Sport: Diving

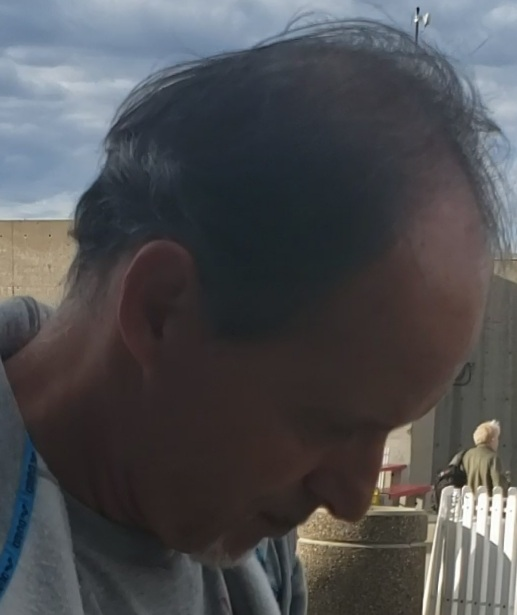
Oscar Bertone photographed in Montréal, Québec, Canada.

Oscar Bertone (born 14 October 1967) is an Italian former diver. He competed in the men's 10 metre platform event at the 1988 Summer Olympics.
