= Kent Ferguson =

American diver (born 1963)

Personal information
- Born: March 9, 1963 (age 63) Cedar Rapids, Iowa, U.S.
Medal record
Men's diving
Representing the United States
World Championships
| Gold medal – first place | 1991 Perth | 3 m springboard |
Pan American Games
| Gold medal – first place | 1991 Havana | 3 m springboard |

Kent Monroe Ferguson (born March 9, 1963) is a retired diver from the United States. He was born in Cedar Rapids, Iowa northwest of Davenport. He competed at the 1992 Summer Olympics, finishing in fifth place in the men's 3 m springboard event.

Ferguson won the gold medal in the same event a year earlier at the 1991 Pan American Games in Havana, Cuba and at the 1991 World Aquatics Championships in Perth, Australia.

He participated in the Fox TV show The Floor in February 2025. He and a friend who also was in the Olympics as a diver had tried out for another program. After getting to the final interview part of the show as a team, they were invited to join The Floor. Ferguson's friend declined saying that he wasn't good at trivia.

== See also ==
- World Fit
