= Steffen Haage =

German diver

Personal information
- Nationality: German
- Born: 16 August 1965 (age 60) Halle, Germany

Sport
- Sport: Diving
Medal record
Men's diving
Representing East Germany
European Championships
Bronze medal – third place	1983 Rome	10 m platform

Steffen Haage (born 16 August 1965) is a German diver. He competed in the men's 10 metre platform event at the 1988 Summer Olympics.
