= Massimo Castellani =

Italian diver (born 1961)

Personal information
- Nationality: Italian
- Born: 16 October 1961 (age 63) Verona, Italy

Sport
- Sport: Diving

Massimo Castellani (born 16 October 1961) is an Italian diver. He competed in the men's 3 metre springboard event at the 1988 Summer Olympics.

== Biography ==
Born in Verona in 1961, he began his diving career in the early 1970s at the Marcantonio Bentegodi Municipal Institution in Verona. Trained by Sergio Sevalié, he won his first Italian Junior Trampoline Championship in 1977, a title he would go on to defend the following year.

In 1980, recruited by the Fiamme Oro sports group, he joined the “Corpo delle Guardie di Pubblica Sicurezza” (Public Security Guard Corps), which, following reform, became the current Polizia di Stato (State Police). 1980 was also the year he won his first Italian title in the 3-meter springboard event at the Costoli swimming pool in Florence. He remained the reigning champion until 1991, when he also won the title in the 1-meter springboard event.

In 1983, he won two medals at the Mediterranean Games in Casablanca: silver in the 10-meter platform, where he finished with 545.55 points behind his compatriot Domenico Rinaldi, and gold in the 3-meter springboard with 616.95 points ahead of Spain's Ricardo Camacho.

Four years later, at the 1987 Mediterranean Games in Latakia, he won silver in the 3-meter springboard with 563.90 points, behind fellow Italian Piero Italiani.

In March 1988, at the Moscow Grand Prix, he set his own record with 650.52 points, which also became the Italian record.

In June 1990, he graduated in Law from the Sapienza University of Rome with a thesis in Criminal Law on the legal obligations of members of sports federations, entitled: “Crimes against the person in the practice of sport.”

After retiring from his sporting career in 1991, he continued his career in the State Police. Among his various roles, he was commander of the operational sections and deputy director of the N.O.C.S., UPGSP manager, and manager of the anti-crime division of the Verona and Mantua police headquarters. He was promoted to the rank of First Executive.
