= Kerstin Finke =

German diver (born 1966)

Personal information
- Nationality: German
- Born: 22 July 1966 (age 59) Aachen, Germany

Sport
- Sport: Diving

Kerstin Finke (born 22 July 1966) is a German diver. She competed in two events at the 1984 Summer Olympics.
