= Ronald Merriott =

American diver

Personal information
- Full name: Ronald Marshall Merriott
- Born: May 24, 1960 (age 66) Rockford, Illinois, U.S.
Medal record
Men's diving
Representing the United States
Olympic Games
Bronze medal – third place	1984 Los Angeles	3 m springboard

Ronald Marshall "Ron" Merriott (born May 24, 1960) is an American former diver who competed in the 1984 Summer Olympics. He was born in Rockford, Illinois. In 1984, Merriott won the NCAA championship in 3-meter springboard diving. His score of 600.3 is the highest of any of the University of Michigan's national champion 3-meter divers.
