= Manouchehr Fasihi =

Iranian diver (born 1940)

Personal information
- Nationality: Iranian
- Born: 24 August 1940 (age 85) Tehran, Iran

Sport
- Sport: Diving
Medal record
Men's diving
Representing Iran
Asian Games
Bronze medal – third place	1958 Tokyo	3m springboard

Manouchehr Fasihi (Persian: منوچهر فصیحی, born 24 August 1940) is an Iranian diver. He competed in the men's 3 metre springboard event at the 1964 Summer Olympics. He also won a bronze medal at the 1958 Asian Games in Tokyo.
