= Dieter Waskow =

German diver

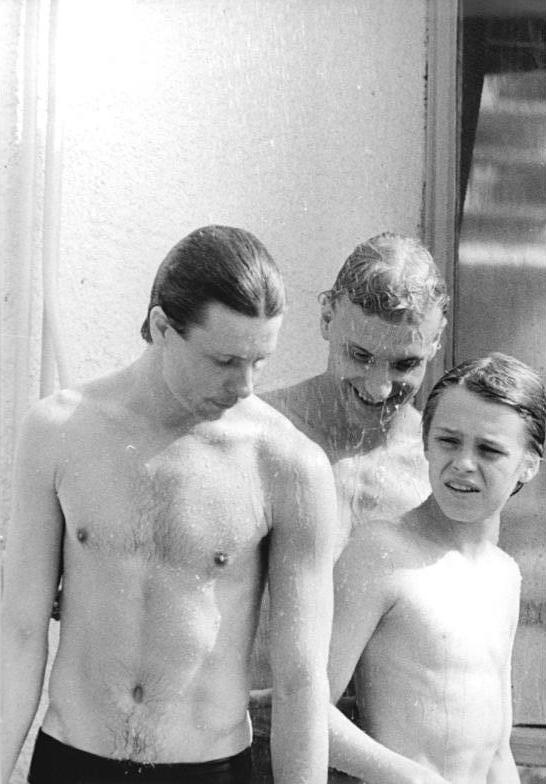
- Dieter Waskow (left) in 1984

Personal information
- Born: 24 June 1957 (age 69) Rostock, East Germany

Sport
- Sport: Diving
Medal record
Representing East Germany
European Championships
Bronze medal – third place	1981 Split	10m platform

Dieter Waskow (born 24 June 1957 in Rostock) is a German former diver who competed in the 1976 Summer Olympics and in the 1980 Summer Olympics.
