= Diving at the 1987 Summer Universiade =

The Diving competition in the 1987 Summer Universiade were held in Zagreb, Yugoslavia.

== Medal overview ==
Event	Gold	Silver	Bronze
Men's 3-Meter Springboard	Tan Liangde (CHN)	Li Deliang (CHN)	Ron Meyer (USA)
Men's Platform	Li Kongzheng (CHN)	Tong Hui (CHN)	Georgiy Chogovadze (URS)
Men's Team	China (CHN)	United States (USA)	Soviet Union (URS)
Women's 3-Meter Springboard	Li Qing (CHN)	Lin Xiaoni (CHN)	Brita Baldus (GDR)
Women's Platform	Lü Wei (CHN)	Anzhela Stasyulevich (URS)	Lin Xiaoni (CHN)
Women's Team	China (CHN)	Soviet Union (URS)	United States (USA)

== Medal table ==
Rank	Nation	Gold	Silver	Bronze	Total
1	China (CHN)	6	3	1	10
2	Soviet Union (URS)	0	2	2	4
3	United States (USA)	0	1	2	3
4	East Germany (GDR)	0	0	1	1
Totals (4 entries)		6	6	6	18
