= Diving at the 1983 Summer Universiade =

The Diving competition in the 1983 Summer Universiade were held in Edmonton, Alberta, Canada.

The men's 10 metre competition was marred by tragedy when Soviet diver Sergei Chalibashvili hit his head on the platform while attempting a reverse 3½ somersault in the tuck position, one of the most difficult dives in the sport; he died the next week without ever regaining consciousness. Future four-time Olympic champion Greg Louganis was preparing to climb the ladder to make his next dive when Chalibashvili was hurt; after the fatally injured Soviet was removed from the pool Louganis executed the very same dive.

== Medal overview ==
Event	Gold	Silver	Bronze
Men's 3-Meter Springboard	Greg Louganis (USA)	Nikolay Droshin (URS)	Tan Liangde (CHN)
Men's Platform	Greg Louganis (USA)	Li Hongping (CHN)	Tong Hui (CHN)
Women's 3-Meter Springboard	Chen Shi (CHN)	Megan Neyer (USA)	Sylvie Bernier (CAN)
Women's Platform	Lü Wei (CHN)	Zhou Jihong (CHN)	Wendy Wyland (USA)

== Medal table ==
Rank	Nation	Gold	Silver	Bronze	Total
1	China (CHN)	2	2	2	6
2	United States (USA)	2	1	1	4
3	Soviet Union (URS)	0	1	0	1
4	Canada (CAN)	0	0	1	1
Totals (4 entries)		4	4	4	12
