= Christina Seufert =

American diver

Personal information
- Full name: Christina Anne Seufert
- Born: January 13, 1957 (age 69) Sacramento, California, United States
- Height: 5 ft 9 in (175 cm)
- Weight: 137 lb (62 kg)

Sport
- Sport: Diving
Medal record
Women's diving
Representing the United States
Olympic Games
| Bronze medal – third place | 1984 Los Angeles | 3m Springboard |
World Championships
| Silver medal – second place | 1982 Guayaquil | 3m Springboard |

Christina Seufert Sholtis (born Christina Anne Seufert; January 13, 1957, in Sacramento, California) and raised in Ambler Pennsylvania is an Olympic diver from the USA. Seufert qualified for the 1980 U.S. Olympic team but did not compete due to the U.S. Olympic Committee's boycott of the 1980 Summer Olympics in Moscow, Russia. She was one of 461 athletes to receive a Congressional Gold Medal instead. She dove for the US at the 1984 Olympics, where she won a bronze medal in the Women's 3m Springboard event.

She went to school and dove for the University of Michigan. She was inducted into the schools' Hall of Honor in 2007.

In 2012, she served as one of the judges for Diving at the 2012 Olympics.
