= Li Qiaoxian =

Chinese diver

Personal information
- Nationality: Chinese
- Born: 15 October 1967 (age 58) Shantou, China

Sport
- Sport: Diving
Medal record
Representing China
Asian Games
Silver medal – second place	1986 Seoul	3m springboard

Li Qiaoxian (simplified Chinese: 李巧贤; traditional Chinese: 李巧賢; pinyin: Lǐ Qiǎoxián; born 15 October 1967) is a Chinese diver. She competed in the women's 3 metre springboard event at the 1984 Summer Olympics.
