= Xu Yanmei (diver) =

Chinese diver

Personal information
- Born: February 9, 1971 (age 55) Ganzhou, Jiangxi, China

Sport
- Sport: Diving
Medal record
Representing China
Summer Olympics
Gold medal – first place	1988 Seoul	10 m platform
Asian Games
Gold medal – first place	1990 Beijing	10 m platform
Gold medal – first place	1990 Beijing	Team
Silver medal – second place	1986 Seoul	10 m platform

Xu Yanmei (Chinese: 许艳梅; born 9 February 1971) is a female Chinese diver. Xu was awarded the "Best Sportsperson since the founding of the People's Republic of China" in 1989.

She retired in 1991, and is married. She studied at Hainan University, and currently serves in the Hainan government.

== Major performances ==
- 1985 World Age Group Championships - 1st springboard (Group B)
- 1987 Holland World Cup - 1st team
- 1987 National Games - 1st platform
- 1988 Seoul Olympic Games - 1st platform
- 1989 Beijing World Cup - 1st team & mixed team
- 1990 Asian Games - 1st platform

== See also ==
- List of members of the International Swimming Hall of Fame
