= Giorgi Chogovadze =

Soviet diver

Personal information
- Nationality: Soviet
- Born: 25 April 1969 (age 57) Tbilisi, Georgian SSR, Soviet Union

Sport
- Sport: Diving
Medal record
Men's diving
Representing the Soviet Union
World Championships
Bronze medal – third place	1991 Perth	10 m platform
European Championships
Gold medal – first place	1987 Strasbourg	10 m platform
Gold medal – first place	1989 Bonn	10 m platform
Universiade
Bronze medal – third place	1987 Zagreb	10 m platform

Giorgi Chogovadze (born 25 April 1969) is a Soviet diver. He competed at the 1988 Summer Olympics and the 1992 Summer Olympics.
