= Carlos Isturiz =

Venezuelan diver

Personal information
- Nationality: Venezuelan
- Born: 2 May 1960 (age 64)

Sport
- Sport: Diving

Carlos Isturiz (born 2 May 1960) is a Venezuelan diver. He competed in the men's 3 metre springboard event at the 1984 Summer Olympics.
