= Diving at the 1994 Asian Games =

- Venue: Big Wave Pool
- Dates: 3–6 October 1994
- Competitors: 26 from 9 nations

Diving was contested at the 1994 Asian Games in Hiroshima, Japan, from October 3 to October 6, 1994.

== Medalists ==
=== Men ===
Event	Gold	Silver	Bronze
3 m springboard	Wang Tianling; China	Yu Zhuocheng; China	Chimaki Yasuda; Japan
10 m platform	Sun Shuwei; China	Xiao Hailiang; China	Keita Kaneto; Japan

=== Women ===
Event	Gold	Silver	Bronze
3 m springboard	Tan Shuping; China	Fu Mingxia; China	Yuki Motobuchi; Japan
10 m platform	Chi Bin; China	Wang Rui; China	Natalya Chikina; Kazakhstan

== Medal table ==
Rank	Nation	Gold	Silver	Bronze	Total
1	China (CHN)	4	4	0	8
2	Japan (JPN)	0	0	3	3
3	Kazakhstan (KAZ)	0	0	1	1
Totals (3 entries)		4	4	4	12

== Participating nations ==
A total of 26 athletes from 9 nations competed in diving at the 1994 Asian Games:

- China (8)
- Chinese Taipei (1)
- Iran (2)
- Japan (6)
- Kazakhstan (3)
- Kuwait (2)
- South Korea (2)
- Thailand (1)
- Uzbekistan (1)
