= Kim Hye-ok (diver) =

North Korean diver (born 1973)

Personal information
- Nationality: North Korean
- Born: 22 April 1973 (age 53)

Sport
- Sport: Diving
Medal record
Women's diving
Representing North Korea
Asian Games
Silver medal – second place	1990 Beijing	Team
Universiade
Gold medal – first place	1991 Sheffield	Platform

Kim Hye-ok (born 22 April 1973) is a North Korean diver. She competed in the women's 3 metre springboard event at the 1992 Summer Olympics.
