= Jesús Mena =

Mexican diver (born 1968)

- Mena in 2014

Personal information
- Born: 28 May 1968 (age 58) Gómez Palacio, Durango, Mexico

Sport
- Country: Mexico
- Sport: Diving
Medal record
Men's diving
Representing Mexico
Olympic Games
Bronze medal – third place	1988 Seoul	10 m platform
Pan American Games
Silver medal – second place	1991 Havana	10 m platform
Universiade
Silver medal – second place	1991 Sheffield	Platform

Jesús Mena Campos (born 28 May 1968 in Gómez Palacio, Durango) is a Mexican former diver.

At his first Olympic Games in 1988 he won a bronze medal in the 10 metre platform event, while also placing seventh in the 3 metre springboard competition.

His final Olympic performance came in 1992 where he placed twelfth in the platform diving. He carried the flag at the opening ceremony of the 1992 Barcelona Games.
