= Diving at the 1958 Asian Games =

- Venue: Metropolitan Indoor Swimming Pool
- Dates: 28–31 May 1958
- Competitors: 12 from 4 nations

Diving was contested at the 1958 Asian Games in Metropolitan Indoor Swimming Pool, Tokyo, Japan from 28 to 31 May 1954.

== Medalists ==
=== Men ===
Event	Gold	Silver	Bronze
3 m springboard	Yutaka Baba; Japan	Shohachi Sakamoto; Japan	Manouchehr Fasihi; Iran
10 m platform	Ryo Mabuchi; Japan	Toshio Yamano; Japan	Hassan Azami; Iran

=== Women ===
Event	Gold	Silver	Bronze
3 m springboard	Kanoko Tsutani; Japan	Sakuko Kadokura; Japan	Taisia Yastreboff; Republic of China
10 m platform	Kumiko Watanabe; Japan	Masami Miyamoto; Japan	None awarded

== Medal table ==
Rank	Nation	Gold	Silver	Bronze	Total
1	Japan (JPN)	4	4	0	8
2	Iran (IRN)	0	0	2	2
3	Republic of China (ROC)	0	0	1	1
Totals (3 entries)		4	4	3	11

== Participating nations ==
A total of 5 athletes from 2 nations competed in diving at the 1958 Asian Games:

- Iran (2)
- Japan (8)
- Republic of China (1)
- South Korea (1)
