= Elke Heinrichs =

German diver

Personal information
- Nationality: German
- Born: 30 August 1964 (age 60); Aachen, Germany

Sport
- Sport: Diving

Elke Heinrichs (born 30 August 1964) is a German diver. She competed at the 1984 Summer Olympics and the 1988 Summer Olympics.
