= Tan Liangde =

Chinese diver

Personal information
- Nationality: China
- Born: July 14, 1965 (age 60) Maoming, Guangdong

Sport
- Sport: Diving
- Event(s): 1 m, 3 m
Medal record
Event	1st	2nd	3rd
Olympic Games	-	3	-
World Championships	-	2	-
Asian Games	4	1	-
Men's diving
Representing China
Olympic Games
Silver medal – second place	1984 Los Angeles	3 m springboard
Silver medal – second place	1988 Seoul	3 m springboard
Silver medal – second place	1992 Barcelona	3 m springboard
World Championships
Silver medal – second place	1986 Madrid	3 m springboard
Silver medal – second place	1991 Perth	3 m springboard
Asian Games
Gold medal – first place	1986 Seoul	3 m springboard
Gold medal – first place	1990 Beijing	1 m springboard
Gold medal – first place	1990 Beijing	3 m springboard
Silver medal – second place	1982 New Delhi	3 m springboard
Summer Universiade
Gold medal – first place	1985 Kobe	3 m springboard
Gold medal – first place	1987 Zagreb	3 m springboard
Bronze medal – third place	1983 Edmonton	3m Springboard

Tan Liangde (Chinese: 谭良德; pinyin: Tán Liángdé; born July 14, 1965, in Maoming, Guangdong) is a famous diver from PR China. He won silver medals in three consecutive Olympic Games from 1984 to 1992. He is currently a coach in Tianjin diving team.

Tan is married to Li Qing, who also won a silver medal in Seoul Olympics, and they have a daughter. The Olympic champions, Hu Jia and Wang Xin, are their students.

== See also ==
- List of members of the International Swimming Hall of Fame
