= Diving at the 1986 Asian Games =

- Venue: Jamsil Indoor Swimming Pool
- Dates: 22–26 September 1986

Diving was contested at the 1986 Asian Games in Jamsil Indoor Swimming Pool, Seoul, South Korea from September 22 to September 26, 1986.

== Medalists ==
=== Men ===
Event	Gold	Silver	Bronze
3 m springboard	Tan Liangde; China	Xu Wenzhan; China	Lee Sun-gee; South Korea
10 m platform	Tong Hui; China	Tu Junhui; China	Keita Kaneto; Japan

=== Women ===
Event	Gold	Silver	Bronze
3 m springboard	Zhang Yuping; China	Li Qiaoxian; China	Yuki Motobuchi; Japan
10 m platform	Lü Wei; China	Xu Yanmei; China	Yayoi Kihara; Japan

== Medal table ==
Rank	Nation	Gold	Silver	Bronze	Total
1	China (CHN)	4	4	0	8
2	Japan (JPN)	0	0	3	3
3	South Korea (KOR)	0	0	1	1
Totals (3 entries)		4	4	4	12
