= Andy Kwan =

Chinese Olympic diver

Personal information
- Nationality: Hong Konger
- Born: 16 December 1962 (age 62)

Sport
- Sport: Diving

Andrew Kwan (born 16 December 1962) is a diver from Hong Kong. He competed in the men's springboard and men's platform events at the 1984 Summer Olympics.
