= Zorra =

- Township (lower-tier)
- Township of Zorra
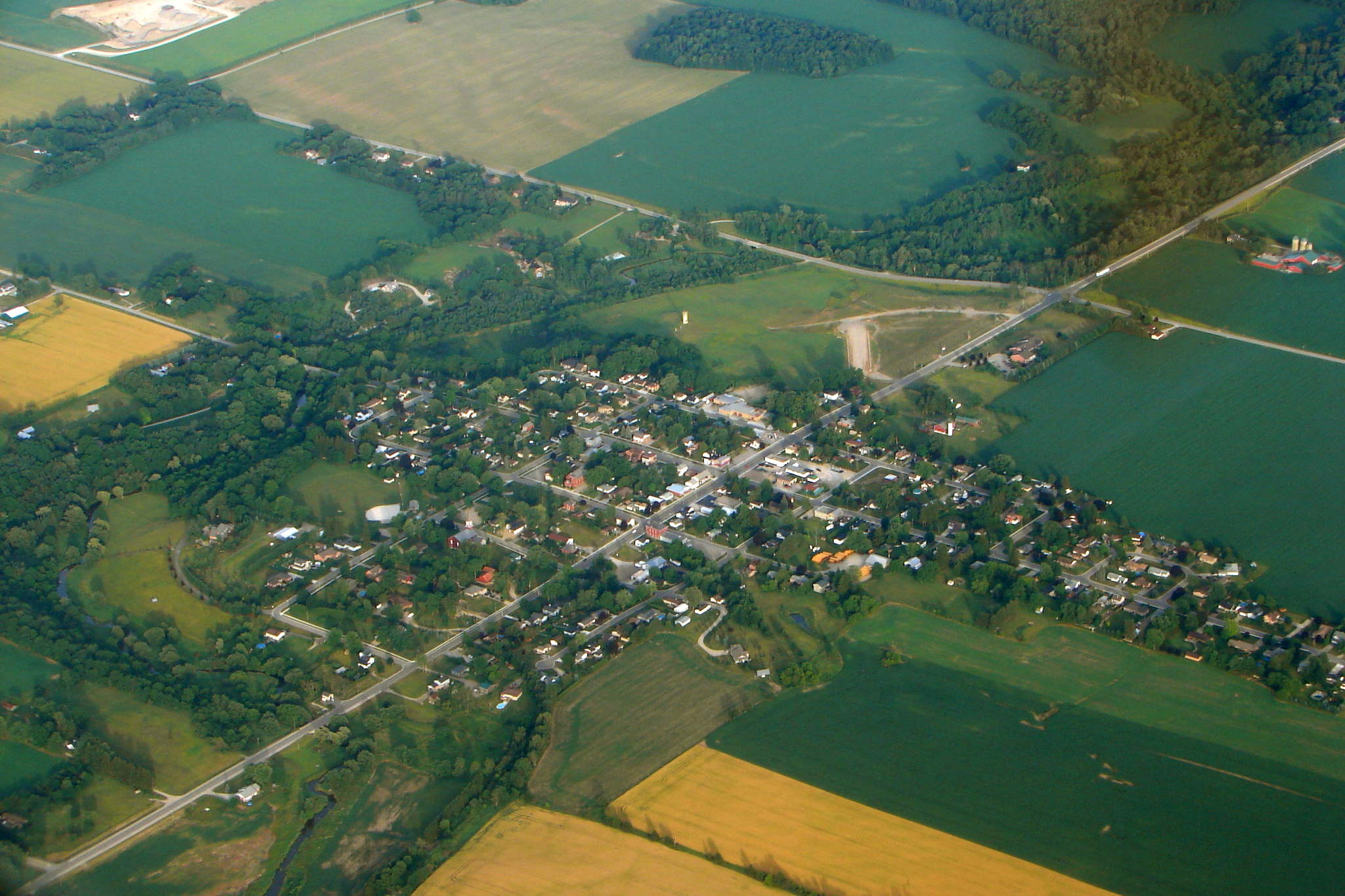
- Embro

- Flag Logo

- Location within Southern Ontario
- Coordinates: 43°09′N 80°57′W
- Country: Canada
- Province: Ontario
- County: Oxford
- Formed: 1975

Government
  - Mayor: Marcus Ryan
  - Federal riding: Oxford
  - Prov. riding: Oxford

Area
  - Land: 528.94 km^{2} (204.22 sq mi)

Population (2016)
  - Total: 8,138
  - Density: 15.4/km^{2} (40/sq mi)
- Time zone: UTC-5 (Eastern Standard Time (EST))
  - Summer (DST): UTC-4 (Eastern Daylight Time (EDT))
- Postal Code: N0J, N0M
- Area codes: 519, 226, 548
- Website: www.zorra.on.ca

Zorra is a township in Oxford County, situated in south-western Ontario, Canada. A predominantly rural municipality, Zorra was formed in 1975 through the amalgamation of East Nissouri, West Zorra and North Oxford townships. It is best known for the Highland Games weekend held each summer in Embro, celebrating the heritage of the Scottish pioneer families which grew from the 1830s to form nearly a quarter of the county's population.

== Government ==
The municipal government is led by a mayor and a councillor from each of the township's four geographic wards:

- Ward 1: Southern portion of township, the former North Oxford township (including Banner, Golspie), excluding Thamesford
- Ward 2: Thamesford
- Ward 3: Northwest portion of township, the former East Nissouri township (including Kintore, Uniondale)
- Ward 4: Northeast portion of township, the former West Zorra township (including Embro, Maplewood)

Marcus Ryan is the current mayor, following the 2018 Ontario municipal elections.

== Communities ==
The township comprises the communities of Banner, Bennington, Brooksdale, Brown's Corners, Cody's Corners, Dicksons Corners, Dunn's Corner, Embro, Golspie, Granthurst, Harrington, Harrington West, Holiday, Kintore, Lakeside, Maplewood, McConkey, Medina, Rayside, Thamesford, Uniondale, Youngsville, and Zorra Station.

== Demographics ==
Historical population
Year	Pop.	±%
2006	8,125	—
2011	8,058	−0.8%
2016	8,138	+1.0%

In the 2021 Census of Population conducted by Statistics Canada, Zorra had a population of 8,628 living in 3,162 of its 3,284 total private dwellings, a change of 6% from its 2016 population of 8,138. With a land area of 529.19 km^{2} (204.32 sq mi), it had a population density of 16.3/km^{2} (42.2/sq mi) in 2021.

== Cultural resources ==
Branches of the Oxford County Library include: Thamesford Public Library, Embro Public Library, and Harrington Community Library.

- Harrington Schoolhouse (Community Centre), initially referred to as S.S. number 17, and subsequently renumbered S.S. number 4, was originally constructed of logs in the mid-1800s. An entrance was located at the north side of the school, and a box stove was used for heating. In 1869, a contract was granted to enlarge the school with a stone addition, to address seating, lighting and other requirements. Purchased by several local residents to be used as a community centre, after the formal closure of one room schools.
- Thamesford District Recreation Centre includes the Haverford arena and skatepark.

Schools include the Zorra Highland Park Public School, Thamesford Public School, A. J. Baker Public School and St. Joseph's Catholic School.

== Attractions ==
- Embro Highland Games, hosted annually by the Zorra Caledonian Society
- Embro Truck & Tractor Pull
- Wienerfest Dog Festival, celebrating the world of Dachshunds to provide funding for pet rescue
- Garagefest, an annual local music festival to raise funds for various charities
- Embro Fall Fair
- Calathumpian a celebration of Thamesfords heritage and history

== Famous people ==
- Henry John Cody (1868–1951), MPP and President of the University of Toronto
- Ralph Connor (1860–1937), novelist
- Jonathan Goforth (1859–1936), missionary to China
- Mark Hominick
- Bob Hayward
- James K.A. Smith
- George Leslie Mackay
- Thomas Oliver
- Randy Sageman
- Elizabeth Wettlaufer, convicted serial killer

== See also ==
- List of townships in Ontario
