= Yuki Motobuchi =

Japanese diver (born 1968)

Personal information
- Nationality: Japanese
- Born: 23 December 1968 (age 57) Tokyo, Japan

Sport
- Sport: Diving
Medal record
Representing Japan
Asian Games
Bronze medal – third place	1986 Seoul	3m springboard
Bronze medal – third place	1990 Beijing	3m springboard
Bronze medal – third place	1990 Beijing	Team
Bronze medal – third place	1994 Hiroshima	3m springboard

Yuki Motobuchi (元渕 幸, Motobuchi Yuki; born 23 December 1968) is a Japanese diver. She competed at the 1988 Summer Olympics, the 1992 Summer Olympics and the 1996 Summer Olympics.
