= Bruce Kimball =

American diver and coach (born 1963)

Personal information
- Born: June 11, 1963 (age 63) Ann Arbor, Michigan, U.S.
Medal record
Men's diving
Representing the United States
Olympic Games
Silver medal – second place	1984 Los Angeles	10m Platform
World Championships
Bronze medal – third place	1982 Guayaquil	10m Platform
Bronze medal – third place	1986 Madrid	10m Platform
Pan American Games
Silver medal – second place	1983 Caracas	10m Platform

Bruce David Kimball (born June 11, 1963) is an American diver and coach. He won a silver medal for the 10 meter platform at the 1984 Summer Olympics.

== Early life and diving career ==
Kimball was born in Ann Arbor, Michigan. His father is Dick Kimball, who coached nine divers to Olympic medals. His brother was punk rock drummer Jim Kimball.

In October 1981, Kimball was struck head-on by a drunken driver. Every bone in his face was fractured, his left leg broken, the ligaments in his knee torn, his liver was lacerated, he had a depressed skull fracture and his spleen had to be removed. When he returned to diving in the summer of 1982, he made the World Championships on platform and earned a bronze medal as well as the nickname "The Comeback Kid."

At the 1984 Summer Olympics, he overtook Li Kongzheng with his final dive to win the silver medal, placing behind fellow American Greg Louganis.

== Vehicular homicide conviction ==
On August 1, 1988, two weeks before the U.S. Olympic diving trials, Kimball, drunk—with a BAC of .20 (twice the legal limit), plowed his late model sports car into a crowd of teenagers while driving an estimated 70 to 90 miles per hour (110 to 140 km/h), killing two boys and severely injuring four others. Despite the tragedy, Kimball took part in the diving trials, but failed to make the team.

He subsequently pleaded guilty to two counts of vehicular homicide and was sentenced to 17 years in prison, followed by 15 years probation, and his driver license was permanently revoked. He was released from prison on November 24, 1993, after serving less than five years. As a part of his sentence, his driving privileges were “permanently” revoked by Judge Harry Coe, and were reinstated in 2018.

== Later life ==
As of 2008, he was married and has three children.
