= Tan Shuping =

Chinese diver

Personal information
- Nationality: Chinese
- Born: 21 January 1978 (age 48) Wuzhou, Guangxi, China

Sport
- Sport: Diving
Medal record
Representing China
World Championships
Gold medal – first place	1994 Rome	3m springboard
Silver medal – second place	1994 Rome	1m springboard
Asian Games
Gold medal – first place	1994 Hiroshima	3m springboard

Tan Shuping (simplified Chinese: 谈舒萍; traditional Chinese: 談舒萍; pinyin: Tán Shūpíng; born 21 January 1978) is a Chinese former diver. She competed at the 1992 Summer Olympics and the 1996 Summer Olympics.
