= Graham Morris =

British diver

Personal information
- Nationality: British (Welsh)
- Born: 28 March 1964 (age 61); Prestatyn, Wales

Sport
- Sport: Diving
- Club: Huddersfield Borough SC

Graham Robert Morris (born 28 March 1964) is a British diver. He competed in the men's 3 metre springboard event at the 1988 Summer Olympics.
