= Lü Wei (diver) =

Chinese diver

Personal information
- Nationality: Chinese
- Born: 1966 Yangzhou, Jiangsu, China
- Died: 9 May 1990 (aged 23–24) Beijing, China

Sport
- Country: China
- Sport: Diving
- Event: 10 m
Medal record
World Aquatics Championships
Silver medal – second place	1986 Madrid	10 m platform
Asian Games
Gold medal – first place	1982 Delhi	10 m platform
Gold medal – first place	1986 Seoul	10 m platform
Universiade
Gold medal – first place	1983 Edmonton	10 m platform
Gold medal – first place	1985 Kobe	10 m platform
Gold medal – first place	1987 Zagreb	10 m platform

Lü Wei (Chinese: 吕伟; pinyin: Lǚ Wěi, 1966 – 9 May 1990) was a Chinese diver who competed in women's 10-metre platform.

== Career ==
She was the gold medalist at the 1982 Asian Games, 1983 Summer Universiade, 1985 Summer Universiade, 1986 Asian Games, and 1987 Summer Universiade.

She missed the 1984 Summer Olympics due to an injury. (Her replacement Zhou Jihong won the Olympic gold medal.)

== Murder ==
Lü Wei was murdered in 1990 along with her friend Peking opera artist Xun Linglai in Xun's home. Lü was then working for the sports bureau in her hometown of Yangzhou and was on a business trip to Beijing, where Xun lived. The case remains unsolved.

== See also ==
- List of unsolved murders (1980–1999)
