= Said Daw =

Egyptian diver

Personal information
- Nationality: Egyptian
- Born: 22 July 1960 (age 65)

Sport
- Sport: Diving

Said Daw (born 22 July 1960) is an Egyptian diver. He competed in two events at the 1984 Summer Olympics.
