= Michele Mitchell (diver) =

American diver and coach (born 1962)

Personal information
- Full name: Michele Anne Mitchell
- Born: January 10, 1962 (age 64) Phoenix, Arizona, U.S.
- Height: 162 cm (5 ft 4 in)
- Weight: 50 kg (110 lb)
- Spouse: Jose Luis Rocha (div 2007)

Sport
- Sport: Diving
- Event: 10 meter platform
- College team: University of Arizona
- Club: Mission Viejo Nadadores (briefly); Mission Bay Makos
- Coached by: Edwin "Win" Young (U. Arizona); Ron O'Brien (Mission Bay)
Medal record
Women's diving
Representing the United States
Olympic Games
| Silver medal – second place | 1984 Los Angeles | 10m platform |
| Silver medal – second place | 1988 Seoul | 10m platform |
Summer Universiade
| Silver medal – second place | 1985 Kobe | 10 m platform |
Pan American Games
| Gold medal – first place | 1987 Indianapolis | 10m platform |

Michele Anne Mitchell (born January 10, 1962, in Phoenix, Arizona) also known during her marriage from around 1990-2007 as Michelle Mitchell-Rocha is a former diver from the United States who competed for the University of Arizona from 1980-1983, and was a former Olympic silver medalist on the 10-meter platform, in both 1984 and 1988. After retiring from competitive diving, she coached the Atlantic Diving team from 1990-96, began coaching at the University of Arizona after 1996, and completed a Masters and PHd from Arizona by 2000.

== Early life ==
Mitchell was born on January 10, 1962 in Scottsdale, Arizona, outside Phoenix and attended Arcadia High. She was active in gymnastics as a youth and would cool off at the pool afterwards. In the summer after seventh grade, former diver Charles “Sparky” Goodrich noticed her in the pool, and introduced her to the sport of diving, giving her lessons at the Arizona Country Club and later recommending she dive with the Coach at Arcadia High. Goodrich also coached diving at Arcadia's rival Paradise Valley High School. Mitchell began competing in gymnastics for Arcadia High School by her Freshman year, specializing in vaulting, and was training in diving by her High School Freshman year as well.

In 1977, representing Arcadia High, she placed first overall in diving helping to lead Arcadia to its first Arizona State Swimming and Diving Championship. As a Junior in the 1977 season, Mitchell broke seven state records, and captured High School All American honors. Mitchell was coached by Chuck McMahon at Arcadia, in both gymnastics and diving. Swimming unattached as a 16-year-old on July 8, 1978, Mitchell won both the 3-meter and 1-meter events at the finals of the AAU Junior Olympic Diving Championships at the Arizona State University pool in Tempe, Arizona.

=== University of Arizona diver ===
Mitchell attended the University of Arizona from 1979-1983. While at Arizona, she was coached by Coach Edwin "Win" Young, a former Indiana University diver, and a 1968 Olympic bronze diving medalist in the 10-meter platform. Young had also been coached for part of his career by Chuck McMahon, as had Mitchell. A four-time All-American at Arizona, Mitchell was a letterwinner all four years. Mitchell was named an Academic All-American in 1983 and won the Tucson Conquistadores Sports Award that year. In her diving career at Arizona, she was an All-American a total of four times. In 1980 and 1983, Mitchell was a Western Collegiate Athletic Association diving champion. In her more distinctive collegiate era diving achievements, she was runner up at the NCAA Championships in the one-meter board in 1982, and a runner up in the platform at the 1982 U.S. National Championships. In 1983, she was honored with the Mortar Board Award for outstanding achievement in academics, athletics and leadership. Mitchell graduated Arizona in 1983 with an English degree, minoring in secondary education and athletic coaching.

Later completing her education at Arizona in 2000 while coaching the university's dive team, she received an MA in sports administration from Arizona and in 2007, a PhD in educational psychology.

In the summer of 1983 after graduating college, she swam briefly with Ron O'Brien and the Mission Viejo diving club in Mission Viejo, California. In February 1984, she had shoulder surgery to address a nagging injury. Around 1985, Mitchell followed her dive coach Ron O'Brien when he left the Mission Viejo Club to coach the Mission May Makos Divers team in Boca Raton, Florida. Increasing her opportunities to learn through observation, her dive mates at Mission Bay included Olympians Greg Louganis and Wendy Wyland. She was a member of the U.S. National team scheduled to swim in Austria and Italy in the summer of 1983. She lived primarily in the Fort Lauderdale area while training with Mission Bay.

Mitchell is a nine-time U.S. national champion, a 1985 World FINA Cup champion, a 1987 Pan American Games champion, and an American record holder for platform diving, with 479.40 points for an eight-dive list. After graduating the University of Arizona, Mitchell received dive training with Ron O'Brien's Mission Bay Makos in the mid to late 1980's, and lived primarily in the Fort Lauderdale area.

== Diving coach and administrator ==
Mitchell officially retired as an elite diver around 1988, spending her last competitive years training with Coach Ron O'Brien. Prior to her coaching the University of Arizona, Mitchell spent six years as the diving coach and a co-owner for the Atlantic Diving Team from around 1990-1996, in Boca Raton, Florida which she coached with her husband Jose Luis Rocha, a former Olympic diver for Mexico who swam for Auburn University. While with the Atlantic Diving Team, she and husband Luis Rocha were named Florida Gold Coast Coaches of the Year consecutively from 1992-96.

=== University of Arizona coach ===
Mitchell then worked as a diving coach at Arizona beginning in August, 1996, and received the Pac-10 Conference Diving Coach of the Year award in 2000, with her first award coming in 1997, one of her first years with Arizona. She later served as the director of operations for the swimming and diving teams at the university. Mitchell and Rocha divorced around 2007 and had two children. A top diver for Mitchell in 2007 was Angelique Rodriguez, a two-time Olympian, who Mitchell coached while at the University of Arizona.

In service to the diving community, Mitchell has served diving by holding notable roles in the collegiate and world diving communities, serving as the Chair of the NCAA Swimming and Diving Rules Committee, the chair of the USA Diving Committee for Competitive Excellence, and the Head Diving Coach at the University of Arizona. She also served as the director of marketing in 1995 for US Water Polo and as a director of marketing for the International Swimming Hall of Fame.

Mitchell worked as a television announcer with stations NBC and ESPN. Her resume consisted of the 1992 Olympic Trials and Games, the 1994 and 1995 NCAA Women's Championships, and the 1993 World University Games. During the summer of 1996, she anchored the in-stadium radio broadcasts for diving at the Olympic Games in Atlanta and was the bungee jump analyst for the ESPN X-Games.

== Honors ==
Mitchell was a 1986 Sullivan Award nominee, and won both the 1989 Lawrence J. Johnson Award, and the 2009 Phil Boggs Award. In 1988 she was inducted into the University of Arizona Athletic Hall of Fame, and the International Swimming Hall of Fame in 1995. She is a four-time U.S. Olympic Committee Athlete of the Year.

== See also ==
- List of members of the International Swimming Hall of Fame
