= Diving at the 1970 Summer Universiade =

The Diving competition in the 1970 Summer Universiade in Turin, Italy.

== Medal overview ==
Event	Gold	Silver	Bronze
Men's 3-Meter Springboard	Klaus Dibiasi (ITA)	James Henry (USA)	Igor Lobanov (URS)
Men's Platform	Klaus Dibiasi (ITA)	James Henry (USA)	Jakub Puchow (POL)
Women's 3-Meter Springboard	Cynthia Potter (USA)	Jerrie Adair (USA)	Elzbieta Wierniuk (POL)
Women's Platform	Galina Kovalenko (URS)	Cynthia Potter (USA)	Lani Lonen (USA)

== Medal table ==
* Host nation (Italy)

Rank	Nation	Gold	Silver	Bronze	Total
1	Italy (ITA)	2	0	0	2
2	United States (USA)	1	4	1	6
3	Soviet Union (URS)	1	0	1	2
4	Poland (POL)	0	0	2	2
Totals (4 entries)		4	4	4	12
