= Yutaka Baba (diver) =

Japanese diver (born 1934)

Personal information
- Nationality: Japanese
- Born: 18 January 1934 (age 92) Tokyo, Japan

Sport
- Sport: Diving
Medal record
Representing Japan
Asian Games
Gold medal – first place	1958 Tokyo	3m springboard
Bronze medal – third place	1954 Manila	3m springboard

Yutaka Baba (馬場豊, Baba Yutaka; born 18 January 1934) is a Japanese former diver. He competed in two events at the 1956 Summer Olympics.
