= Diving at the 1990 Asian Games =

- Venue: Ying Tung Natatorium
- Dates: 1–6 October 1990

Diving was contested at the 1990 Asian Games in Beijing, China from October 1 to October 6, 1990.

== Medalists ==
=== Men ===
Event	Gold	Silver	Bronze
1 m springboard	Tan Liangde; China	Wang Yijie; China	Chimaki Yasuda; Japan
3 m springboard	Tan Liangde; China	Li Deliang; China	Lee Yuan-ming; Chinese Taipei
10 m platform	Sun Shuwei; China	Xiong Ni; China	Keita Kaneto; Japan
Team	China; Li Deliang; Sun Shuwei; Tan Liangde; Wang Yijie; Xiong Ni	Japan; Keita Kaneto; Takamasa Ogasawara; Chimaki Yasuda	North Korea; An Chol-hyok; Cho Gum-san; Kim Yong-su; Song Yong-il

=== Women ===
Event	Gold	Silver	Bronze
1 m springboard	Gao Min; China	Yu Xiaoling; China	Yuki Motobuchi; Japan
3 m springboard	Gao Min; China	Zhang Yuping; China	Yuki Motobuchi; Japan
10 m platform	Xu Yanmei; China	Kim Chun-ok; North Korea	Fu Mingxia; China
Team	China; Fu Mingxia; Gao Min; Xu Yanmei; Yu Xiaoling; Zhang Yuping	North Korea; Ho Yong-hwa; Kang Hyon-suk; Kim Chun-ok; Kim Hye-ok	Japan; Masako Asada; Yuki Motobuchi; Kaoru Yonekura

== Medal table ==
Rank	Nation	Gold	Silver	Bronze	Total
1	China (CHN)	8	5	1	14
2	North Korea (PRK)	0	2	1	3
3	Japan (JPN)	0	1	5	6
4	Chinese Taipei (TPE)	0	0	1	1
Totals (4 entries)		8	8	8	24
