= Rikiko Yamanaka =

Japanese diver (born 1955)

Personal information
- Nationality: Japanese
- Born: 8 September 1955 (age 70) Hiroshima, Japan

Sport
- Sport: Diving
Medal record
Representing Japan
Asian Games
Bronze medal – third place	1978 Bangkok	3m springboard
Bronze medal – third place	1978 Bangkok	10m platform

Rikiko Yamanaka (山中 理貴子, Yamanaka Rikiko; born 8 September 1955) is a Japanese diver. She competed in two events at the 1976 Summer Olympics.
