= Masashi Nakashima =

Japanese diver

Personal information
- Nationality: Japanese
- Born: 22 March 1962 (age 64)

Sport
- Sport: Diving
Medal record
Representing Japan
Asian Games
Bronze medal – third place	1982 New Delhi	3m springboard
Bronze medal – third place	1982 New Delhi	10m platform

Masashi Nakashima (中島 勝司, Nakashima Masashi; born 22 March 1962) is a Japanese diver. He competed in the men's 10 metre platform event at the 1984 Summer Olympics.
