= Diving at the 1985 Summer Universiade =

The Diving competition in the 1985 Summer Universiade were held in Kobe, Japan.

== Medal overview ==
Event	Gold	Silver	Bronze
Men's 3-Meter Springboard	Tan Liangde (CHN)	Abel Ramírez (CUB)	Mark Bradshaw (USA)
Men's Platform	Tong Hui (CHN)	Dan Watson (USA)	Yang Cheng (CHN)
Men's Team	United States (USA)	China (CHN)	Soviet Union (URS)
Women's 3-Meter Springboard	Zhanna Tsyrulnikova (URS)	Li Yihua (CHN)	Tristan Baker (USA)
Women's Platform	Lü Wei (CHN)	Michele Mitchell (USA)	Аlla Lobankina (URS)
Women's Team	China (CHN)	United States (USA)	Soviet Union (URS)

== Medal table ==
Rank	Nation	Gold	Silver	Bronze	Total
1	China (CHN)	4	2	1	7
2	United States (USA)	1	3	2	6
3	Soviet Union (URS)	1	0	3	4
4	Cuba (CUB)	0	1	0	1
Totals (4 entries)		6	6	6	18
