= Nicole Kreil =

Austrian diver

Personal information
- Nationality: Austrian
- Born: 8 August 1965 (age 59)

Sport
- Sport: Diving

Nicole Kreil (born 8 August 1965) is an Austrian diver. She competed in two events at the 1984 Summer Olympics.
