= Natalya Chikina =

Kazakhstani diver

Personal information
- Nationality: Kazakhstani
- Born: 1 February 1975 (age 51) Alma-Ata, Kazakh SSR, Soviet Union

Sport
- Sport: Diving
Medal record
Representing Kazakhstan
Asian Games
Bronze medal – third place	1994 Hiroshima	3m springboard

Natalya Chikina (born 1 February 1975) is a Kazakhstani diver. She competed at the 1996 Summer Olympics and the 2000 Summer Olympics.
