= Kumiko Watanabe (diver) =

Japanese diver (born 1936)

Personal information
- Nationality: Japanese
- Born: 10 May 1936 (age 90) Tokyo, Japan

Sport
- Sport: Diving
Medal record
Representing Japan
Asian Games
Gold medal – first place	1958 Tokyo	10m platform

Kumiko Watanabe (渡辺久美子, Watanabe Kumiko; born 10 May 1936) is a Japanese diver. She competed at the 1960 Summer Olympics and the 1964 Summer Olympics.
