= Kanoko Tsutani-Mabuchi =

Japanese diver (1938–2025)

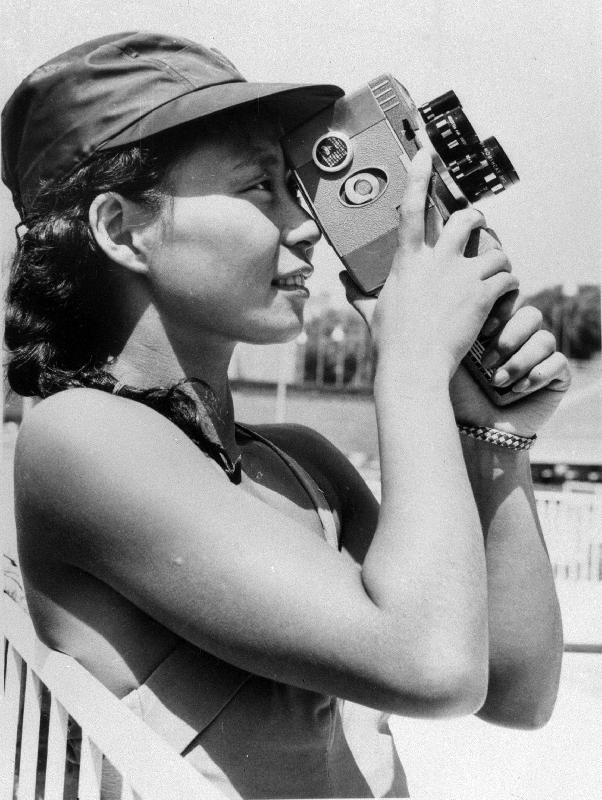
- Tsutani-Mabuchi at the 1960 Olympics

Personal information
- Born: January 6, 1938 Hyogo Prefecture, Japan
- Died: January 4, 2025 (aged 86) Hyogo, Japan
- Height: 160 cm (5 ft 3 in)
- Weight: 48 kg (106 lb)

Sport
- Sport: Diving
Medal record
Representing Japan
Asian Games
Bronze medal – third place	1954 Manila	3 m springboard
Bronze medal – third place	1954 Manila	10 m platform
Gold medal – first place	1958 Tokyo	3 m springboard
Gold medal – first place	1970 Bangkok	3 m springboard
Bronze medal – third place	1974 Tehran	3 m springboard

Kanoko Tsutani-Mabuchi (津谷-馬淵 鹿乃子, January 6, 1938 – January 4, 2025) was a Japanese diver who won five medals in the 3 m. springboard and 10 m. platform events at the Asian Games in 1954–74. Together with her husband Ryo Mabuchi she competed in the springboard and platform at the 1956, 1960 and 1964 Summer Olympics and placed 7th–16th. Her daughter Yoshino Mabuchi also became an Olympic diver. Mabuchi died from pneumonia on January 4, 2025, at the age of 87.
