= Edwin Jongejans =

Dutch diver

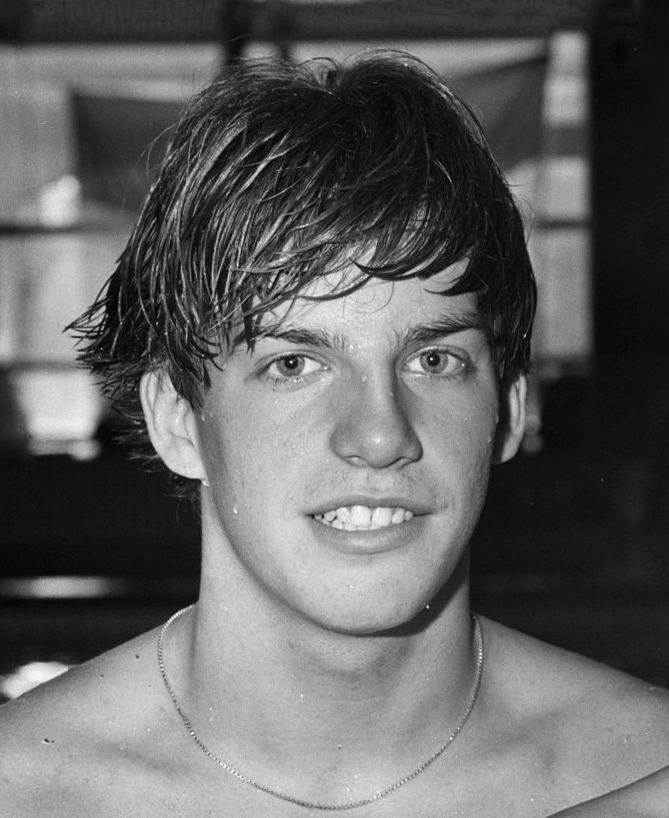
- Edwin Jongejans in 1984

Personal information
- Born: 18 December 1966 (age 59) Amstelveen, the Netherlands
- Height: 1.71 m (5 ft 7 in)
- Weight: 69 kg (152 lb)

Sport
- Sport: Diving
- Club: Saltor Amsterdam
Medal record
Representing the Netherlands
World Championships
| Gold medal – first place | 1991 Perth | 1 m springboard |
European Championships
| Gold medal – first place | 1989 Bonn | 1 m springboard |
| Gold medal – first place | 1995 Vienna | 1 m springboard |
| Bronze medal – third place | 1991 Athens | 1 m springboard |

Edwin Jongejans (born 18 December 1966) is a retired diver from the Netherlands. He competed at the 1988 and 1992 Olympic in the springboard event and finished in eights and seventh place, respectively. His sister Daphne competed in the same event at the 1984, 1988 and 1992 Olympics. Between 1989 and 1995 Jongejans won one world and two European titles in the 1 m springboard. In 1991 he was chosen as the Dutch Sportsman of the year.

He coached Team GB's Hannah Starling at the 3 metre springboard and has coached her as far as the semi-finals of the woman's 3 metre springboard during the London 2012 Olympics. His pupils Jack Laugher and Chris Mears won gold at the Rio de Janeiro 2016 Olympics. In 2018 Jongejans returned to Holland and became coach of the Dutch diving team.

Awards
| Preceded by Erik Breukink | Dutch Sportsman of the Year; 1991 | Succeeded by Bart Veldkamp |
