= Ryo Mabuchi =

Japanese diver (1933–2021)

Personal information
- Born: March 12, 1933 Ishikawa Prefecture, Japan
- Died: November 22, 2021 (aged 88)
- Height: 167 cm (5 ft 6 in)
- Weight: 60 kg (132 lb)

Sport
- Sport: Diving
Medal record
Representing Japan
Asian Games
Gold medal – first place	1958 Tokyo	10 m platform

Ryo Mabuchi (馬淵 良, 12 March 1933 – 22 November 2021) was a Japanese diver who won the 10 platform event at the 1958 Asian Games. Together with his wife Kanoko Tsutani-Mabuchi, he competed in the springboard and platform at the 1956 and 1960 Summer Olympics and placed 12th–18th. His daughter Yoshino Mabuchi also became an Olympic diver.

Mabuchi died of emphysema on 22 November 2021, at the age of 88.
