= Simon McCormack =

Australian diver

Personal information
- Nationality: Australian
- Born: 12 February 1972 (age 54)

Sport
- Sport: Diving
Medal record
Diving
Representing Australia
Commonwealth Games
Silver medal – second place	1990 Auckland	1m springboard
Universiade
Bronze medal – third place	1991 Sheffield	1 m springboard

Simon Patrick McCormack (born 12 February 1972) is an Australian diver. He competed in the men's 3 metre springboard event at the 1992 Summer Olympics.
