= Juha Ovaskainen =

Finnish diver

Personal information
- Nationality: Finnish
- Born: 30 October 1961 (age 63); Helsinki, Finland

Sport
- Sport: Diving

Juha Ovaskainen (born 30 October 1961) is a Finnish diver. He competed at the 1984 Summer Olympics and the 1988 Summer Olympics.
