= Mark Bradshaw (diver) =

American diver (born 1962)

Personal information
- Full name: Mark Daniel Bradshaw
- National team: United States
- Born: May 12, 1962 (age 64) Happy Camp, California
- Height: 175 cm (5 ft 9 in)
- Weight: 70 kg (154 lb)

Sport
- College team: Ohio State University
- Coached by: Vince Panzano, Diving
Medal record
Men's diving
Representing the United States
Pan American Games
Silver medal – second place	1991 Havana	3m Springboard
Silver medal – second place	1995 Mar del Plata	3m Springboard
Summer Universiade
Bronze medal – third place	1985 Kobe	3 m springboard
Goodwill Games
Bronze medal – third place	1990 Seattle	1m Springboard
Bronze medal – third place	1990 Seattle	3m Springboard

Mark Daniel Bradshaw (born May 12, 1962) is an American retired diver who competed for Ohio State University. He represented the United States at the 1988 Summer Olympics, finishing in fifth place in the Men's 3m Springboard event.

== Ohio State ==
Bradshaw was an Oympic-level diver for Ohio State University, where he was mentored by Coach Vince Panzano, a former dive team member and graduate of Ohio State in 1973 who mentored multiple Olympic teams with over 10 coaching awards. At Ohio State, Bradshaw was a four-time All-American and won the NCAA springboard title in 1983.

== International competition ==
Bradshaw twice won a silver medal in springboard at the Pan American Games, in 1991 and 1995.

He won two bronze medals at the 1990 Goodwill Games in the 1 and 2-meter springboard.

In 1999, he was made the head diving coach at Arizona State University, a position he held for over a decade. He was recognized as the Pac-10 Conference Coach of the Year in multiple years and led ASU divers to several Pac-10 titles. He has also served as the head diving coach for Finland at both the 2004 and 2008 Olympics.
