= Lee Sun-gee =

South Korean diver

Personal information
- Nationality: South Korean
- Born: 10 February 1965 (age 61)

Sport
- Sport: Diving
Medal record
Representing South Korea
Asian Games
Bronze medal – third place	1986 Seoul	3m springboard

Lee Sun-gee (Korean: 이•선기, born 10 February 1965) is a South Korean diver. He competed in two events at the 1988 Summer Olympics.
