= Diving at the 1984 Summer Olympics =

Diving at the Games of the XXIII Olympiad
- Venue: Uytengsu Aquatics Center
- Dates: August 5–12, 1984
- No. of events: 4
- Competitors: 80 from 29 nations

At the 1984 Summer Olympics in Los Angeles, four diving events (2 for men and 2 for women) were contested during a competition that took place at the Olympic Swim Stadium of the University of Southern California (USC), from 5 to 12 August, comprising 80 divers from 29 nations.

Notable changes from 1980 include the newly-introduced limit on the number of athletes a single NOC can enter, down from three in Moscow to two in Los Angeles. This was done to prevent nations from sweeping the podiums.

== Medal summary ==
The events are named according to the International Olympic Committee labelling, but they appeared on the official report as "springboard diving" and "platform diving", respectively.

=== Men ===
Event	Gold	Silver	Bronze
3 m springboard	Greg Louganis; United States	Tan Liangde; China	Ronald Merriott; United States
10 m platform	Greg Louganis; United States	Bruce Kimball; United States	Li Kongzheng; China

=== Women ===
Event	Gold	Silver	Bronze
3 m springboard	Sylvie Bernier; Canada	Kelly McCormick; United States	Christina Seufert; United States
10 m platform	Zhou Jihong; China	Michele Mitchell; United States	Wendy Wyland; United States

== Medal table ==
Rank	Nation	Gold	Silver	Bronze	Total
1	United States	2	3	3	8
2	China	1	1	1	3
3	Canada	1	0	0	1
Totals (3 entries)		4	4	4	12

== Participating nations ==
Here are listed the nations that were represented in the diving events and, in brackets, the number of national competitors.

- Argentina (1)
- Australia (4)
- Austria (1)
- Belgium (1)
- Brazil (1)
- Canada (7)
- China (8)
- Dominican Republic (3)
- Egypt (4)
- Finland (1)
- France (1)
- Great Britain (6)
- Hong Kong (2)
- Italy (2)
- Japan (3)
- Kuwait (2)
- Mexico (6)
- Netherlands (1)
- New Zealand (3)
- Norway (2)
- Portugal (1)
- South Korea (1)
- Spain (2)
- Sweden (2)
- Syria (1)
- United States (7)
- Venezuela (1)
- West Germany (4)
- Zimbabwe (2)

== See also ==
- Diving at the 1983 Pan American Games
- Diving at the Friendship Games
