= Tong Hui =

Chinese diver

Personal information
- Born: March 8, 1963 (age 63) Wuhan, China
- Occupations: Professional Diver, Diving Coach
- Children: 2, including Alexander Tong

Sport
- Sport: Diving
- Event: 10 m
Medal record
Men's diving
Representing China
Universiade
Gold medal – first place	1985 Kobe	10 m platform
Silver medal – second place	1987 Zagreb	10 m platform
Bronze medal – third place	1983 Edmonton	10 m platform
Asian Games
Gold medal – first place	1982 New Delhi	10 m platform
Gold medal – first place	1986 Seoul	10 m platform

Tong Hui (Chinese: 童辉; pinyin: Tóng Huī; born 8 March 1963) is a former Chinese diver who competed in the 1984 Summer Olympics.
