= Piero Italiani =

Italian diver (born 1962)

Personal information
- Nationality: Italian
- Born: 26 March 1962 (age 63); Pescara, Italy

Sport
- Sport: Diving

Piero Italiani (born 26 March 1962) is an Italian diver. He competed at the 1984 Summer Olympics and the 1988 Summer Olympics.
