= Zhou Jihong =

Chinese diver

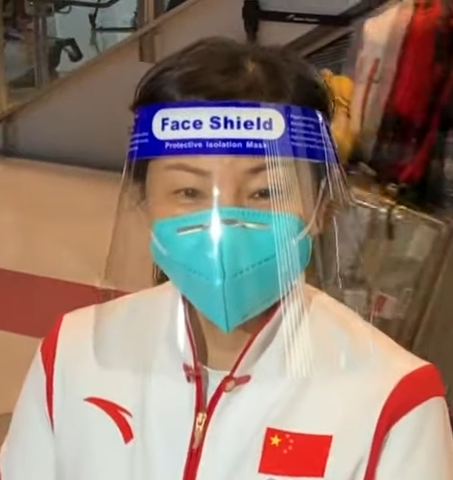
- Zhou in 2021

Personal information
- Born: 11 January 1965 (age 61) Wuhan, Hubei, China
Medal record
Women's diving
Representing China
Olympic Games
Gold medal – first place	1984 Los Angeles	10 m platform
World Championships
Bronze medal – third place	1982 Guayaquil	10 m platform
Asian Games
Silver medal – second place	1982 New Delhi	10 m platform
Universiade
Silver medal – second place	1983 Edmonton	10 m platform

Zhou Jihong (simplified Chinese: 周继红; traditional Chinese: 周繼紅; pinyin: Zhōu Jìhóng, born 11 January 1965) is a Chinese diver who represented China at the 1984 Summer Olympics in Los Angeles.

== Sports career ==
Born in Wuhan on 1965, Zhou originally practiced gymnastics before switching to diving. In 1977, she entered the Hubei diving team and began to receive professional diving training. She won the national championship in 1981 and entered the Chinese women's diving team in 1982.

In 1984, during the 1984 Summer Olympics in Los Angeles, she replaced Lü Wei, after Lü suffered from an injury. In the women's 10 metre platform, she won the gold medal with a total score of 435.51 points becoming the first Chinese diver to win a gold medal in the Olympics. In the same year, she was named the best athlete of the year in women's platform diving by magazine Swimming World.

In 1998, she became the team leader of the Chinese diving team. Under her leadership, Fu Mingxia and Guo Jingjing won gold and silver medals in the women's 3 metre springboard at the 2000 Summer Olympics in Sydney. In the 2004 Summer Olympics in Athens, the Chinese diving team won 6 gold medals, 2 silver medals and 1 bronze medal. At the 2008 Summer Olympics in Beijing, Zhou led the Chinese diving team in winning 7 gold medals.

In March 2014, Zhou was appointed chairman of the Athlete Committee by FINA and in November 2017, she served as the chairman of the Chinese Swimming Association. In January 2019, she served as a member of the Chinese Olympic Committee and in January 2020, she served as the chairman of China Diving Association. On 5 June 2021, at the FINA Congress held in Doha, Qatar, Zhou was elected Vice President of FINA, becoming the first female vice president in the organization's history.

On 14 July 2021, Zhou was assigned as the diving team leader within the Chinese sports delegation for the 2020 Summer Olympics.

== Personal life ==
In 1986, she retired briefly in order to complete her studies in English at Peking University. After graduating in 1990, she continued to serve as the coach of the Chinese National Diving Team.

In 1992, Zhou married to Tian Bingyi, a former Chinese badminton player and now the coach of Chinese national badminton team. In 1994, she gave birth to her son.

== Controversy ==
In May 2022, New Zealand diving judge Lisa Wright revealed that during the 2020 Summer Olympics, Zhou allegedly launched a verbal tirade at Wright at the conclusion of the men's 10m platform final. Wright alleged that Zhou verbally abused her for underscoring Chinese divers. Diving New Zealand subsequently complained about the incident to FINA's Ethics Panel. As a result, Zhou was ordered by in a FINA Ethics Panel decision to write a letter of apology to Wright. A recommendation was also made by the Ethics Panel to disestablish Zhou's position as Diving Bureau Liaison for FINA. The FINA Ethics Panel stated that the incident during the men's platform final was "unfortunate" and led to a "misunderstanding mixed with misjudgement" between Wright and Zhou.

In May 2022, former international diver, Olympic judge and previous member of FINA's Technical Diving Committee from New Zealand Simon Latimer revealed he had sent a whistleblower complaint to FINA's Executive Director Brent Nowicki in December 2021 detailing Zhou's alleged "unethical behavior" which also contained allegations that Zhou has routinely coached Chinese divers during major events such as the Olympics and World Championships and she had manipulated judging panels in order to benefit Chinese athletes. Latimer claimed that Zhou's behavior was tarnishing the reputation of international diving and that she was acting in the interests of China rather than international diving as a whole.

Subsequent to Latimer's complaint, video evidence emerged online showing Zhou coaching Chinese divers during competition sessions at the 2020 Summer Olympics, a behavior considered unethical given her supposedly neutral role as a FINA Vice President and Diving Bureau Liaison.

In July 2022, Latimer was not re-elected to FINA's Technical Diving Committee, and Zhou was one of the FINA Bureau Member's who had input in the selection process.

In 2022 FINA's By Laws were updated to state that the Bureau Liaison position that Zhou holds should not interfere on the field of play during competitions and that individuals holding that position shall not act as a Team Leader or coach at international events including the Olympic Games.

Zhou was President of the Chinese Swimming Association in April 2024 when 23 Chinese swimmers tested positive for the banned medication trimetazidine (TMZ) at the Shijiazhuang Chinese Long Course Invitational from 31 December 2020 to 3 January 2021, but the results were handled as cases of contamination without being made public.

Zhou has also been embroiled in controversy domestically in China. In 2008, renowned coach, Yu Fen, accused Zhou of fraudulently withholding prize money that was due for distribution between Chinese athletes and coaches. In 2009, Zhou faced allegations of match-fixing at China's own National Games, with a judge alleging that Zhou had chosen all twelve gold medalists before competitions commenced.

== See also ==
- List of members of the International Swimming Hall of Fame
