= Yoshino Mabuchi =

Japanese diver (born 1966)

Personal information
- Born: February 2, 1966 (age 60)
- Height: 162 cm (5 ft 4 in)
- Weight: 46 kg (101 lb)

Sport
- Sport: Diving
Medal record
Representing Japan
Asian Games
Bronze medal – third place	1982 New Delhi	3 m springboard
Bronze medal – third place	1982 New Delhi	10 m platform

Yoshino Mabuchi (馬淵 よしの, born February 2, 1966) is a retired Japanese diver who won bronze medals in the 3 m springboard and 10 platform events at the 1982 Asian Games. She placed ninth in the platform at the 1984 Summer Olympics and could not compete at the 1980 Moscow Games due to their boycott by Japan. Her parents Kanoko Tsutani-Mabuchi and Ryo Mabuchi were also Olympic divers.

Mabuchi won five national titles in diving. After retiring from competitions she ran a restaurant in Kobe, worked as TV personality, and served as a diving referee.
