= Keita Kaneto =

Japanese diver (born 1967)

Personal information
- Nationality: Japanese
- Born: 29 April 1967 (age 59) Tokyo, Japan

Sport
- Sport: Diving
Medal record
Representing Japan
Asian Games
Silver medal – second place	1990 Beijing	Team
Bronze medal – third place	1986 Seoul	10m platform
Bronze medal – third place	1990 Beijing	10m platform
Bronze medal – third place	1994 Hiroshima	10m platform

Keita Kaneto (金戸恵太, Kaneto Keita; born 29 April 1967) is a Japanese diver. He competed at the 1988 Summer Olympics, the 1992 Summer Olympics and the 1996 Summer Olympics.
