= Albin Killat =

German diver

Personal information
- Born: 1 January 1961 (age 65) Munich, Bayern, West Germany
Medal record
Men's diving
World Championships
Representing Germany
| Bronze medal – third place | 1991 Perth | 3 m springboard |
European Championships
Representing West Germany
| Gold medal – first place | 1987 Strasbourg | 3 m springboard |
| Gold medal – first place | 1989 Bonn | 3 m springboard |
| Silver medal – second place | 1985 Sofia | 10 m platform |
Representing Germany
| Gold medal – first place | 1991 Athens | 3 m springboard |

Albin Killat (born 1 January 1961) is a retired diver from Germany, who is best known for twice winning the gold medal in the men's 3m springboard event at the European Championships (1987 and 1991).

Killat represented West Germany in two consecutive Summer Olympics, starting in 1984 (Los Angeles, California). He ended his Olympic career in 1992 as a member of the Unified German Team in Barcelona, Spain. He was affiliated with the Sportverein Münchener Sportclub 100 during his career.
