= Li Deliang =

Chinese diver (born 1967)

Personal information
- Nationality: China
- Born: September 19, 1967 (age 58) Shantou, Guangdong

Sport
- Sport: Diving
- Event: 3 m
Medal record
Event	1st	2nd	3rd
Olympic Games	0	0	1
Summer Universiade	1	1	0
Asian Games	1	1	0
Men's diving
Representing China
Olympic Games
Bronze medal – third place	1988 Seoul	3m springboard
Summer Universiade
Gold medal – first place	1991 Sheffield	3 m springboard
Silver medal – second place	1987 Zagreb	3 m springboard
Asian Games
Gold medal – first place	1990 Beijing	Team
Silver medal – second place	1990 Beijing	3m springboard

Li Deliang (Chinese: 李德亮; born September 19, 1967) is a retired male diver from PR China. He competed at the 1988 Seoul Olympic Games, and won the bronze medal in Men's 3m Springboard event.

Now coaches at El Monte Aquatic center.
