= Diving at the 1988 Summer Olympics =

Diving at the Games of the XXIV Olympiad
- Venue: Jamsil Indoor Swimming Pool
- Dates: 17 September 1988 through 29 September 1988
- No. of events: 4
- Competitors: 89 from 30 nations

At the 1988 Summer Olympics in Seoul, four diving events were contested during a competition that took place at the Jamsil Indoor Swimming Pool, from 17 to 20 September and from 26 to 29 September, comprising 89 divers from 30 nations.

== Medal summary ==
The events are named according to the International Olympic Committee labelling, but they appeared on the official report as "springboard diving" and "platform diving", respectively.

=== Men ===
Event	Gold	Silver	Bronze
3 m springboard	Greg Louganis; United States	Tan Liangde; China	Li Deliang; China
10 m platform	Greg Louganis; United States	Xiong Ni; China	Jesús Mena; Mexico

=== Women ===
Event	Gold	Silver	Bronze
3 m springboard	Gao Min; China	Li Qing; China	Kelly McCormick; United States
10 m platform	Xu Yanmei; China	Michele Mitchell; United States	Wendy Williams; United States

== Medal table ==
Rank	Nation	Gold	Silver	Bronze	Total
1	China	2	3	1	6
2	United States	2	1	2	5
3	Mexico	0	0	1	1
Totals (3 entries)		4	4	4	12

== Participating nations ==
Here are listed the nations that were represented in the diving events and, in brackets, the number of national competitors.

- Argentina (1)
- Australia (5)
- Austria (2)
- Bahamas (1)
- Barbados (1)
- Belgium (1)
- Brazil (1)
- Canada (6)
- China (8)
- East Germany (4)
- Ecuador (1)
- Finland (1)
- France (2)
- Great Britain (5)
- Hong Kong (2)
- Hungary (3)
- Italy (4)
- Japan (4)
- Kuwait (1)
- Mexico (3)
- Netherlands (2)
- Norway (1)
- Poland (1)
- South Korea (2)
- Soviet Union (8)
- Spain (2)
- Sweden (2)
- Switzerland (2)
- United States (7)
- West Germany (6)
- Zimbabwe (1)
- Venezuela (1)

== See also ==
- Diving at the 1987 Pan American Games
