= Li Kongzheng =

Chinese diver

Personal information
- Nationality: China
- Born: 4 May 1959 (age 67) Nanning, Guangxi, People’s Republic of China

Sport
- Sport: Diving
- Event(s): 3 m, 10 m
Medal record
Event	1st	2nd	3rd
Olympic Games	0	0	1
World Championships	0	1	0
Asian Games	2	1	0
Summer Universiade	1	0	2
Men's diving
Representing China
Olympic Games
Bronze medal – third place	1984 Los Angeles	10m Platform
World Championships
Silver medal – second place	1986 Madrid	10m Platform
Asian Games
Gold medal – first place	1974 Tehran	10m Platform
Gold medal – first place	1982 New Delhi	3m Springboard
Silver medal – second place	1978 Bangkok	3m Springboard
Summer Universiade
Gold medal – first place	1987 Zagreb	10 m platform
Bronze medal – third place	1979 Mexico City	3 m springboard
Bronze medal – third place	1981 Bucharest	3 m springboard

Li Kongzheng (Chinese: 李孔政; pinyin: Lǐ Kǒngzhèng; born 4 May 1959) is a Chinese diver.

At his first Olympic Games in 1984 he won a bronze medal in the 10 metre platform event. He also participated in the Seoul Olympics four years later, placing sixth in the same event.

He is now coaching at the University of Michigan and has had much success with all of his divers receiving national medals.

He has coached internationally, including Australia.

== Family ==
He has two children.
