= Diving at the 1981 Summer Universiade =

The Diving competition in the 1981 Summer Universiade were held in Bucharest, Romania.

== Medal overview ==
Event	Gold	Silver	Bronze
Men's 3-Meter Springboard	Sergey Kuzmin (URS)	Aleksandr Portnov (URS)	Li Kongzheng (CHN)
Men's Platform	Li Hongping (CHN)	Vyacheslav Troshin (URS)	Vladimir Aleynik (URS)
Women's 3-Meter Springboard	Li Yihua (CHN)	Megan Neyer (USA)	Ruxandra Hociotă (ROM)
Women's Platform	Chen Xiaoxia (CHN)	Li Yihua (CHN)	Yelena Matyushenko (URS)

== Medal table ==
Rank	Nation	Gold	Silver	Bronze	Total
1	China (CHN)	3	1	1	5
2	Soviet Union (URS)	1	2	2	5
3	United States (USA)	0	1	0	1
4	Romania (ROM)	0	0	1	1
Totals (4 entries)		4	4	4	12

Men's 3-Meter Springboard

Rank	Diver	Nation	Points
1st place, gold medalist(s)	Sergey Kuzmin	Soviet Union	648.45
2nd place, silver medalist(s)	Aleksandr Portnov	Soviet Union	646.68
3rd place, bronze medalist(s)	Li Kongzheng	China	618.84
4	Randy Abelman	United States	610.35
5	Chris Snode	United Kingdom	598.47
6	Pedreguera Ruiz	Cuba	580.38
7	Liu Henglin	China	577.59
8	Francisco Rueda	Mexico	572.49
9	Salvador Sobrino	Mexico	559.23
10	Károly Némedi	Hungary	555.36
11	Dieter Dörr	West Germany	549.21
12	Juan Carlos Ramírez	Cuba	513.09

Men's Platform

Rank	Diver	Nation	Points
1st place, gold medalist(s)	Li Hongping	China	617.67
2nd place, silver medalist(s)	Vyacheslav Troshin	Soviet Union	574.35
3rd place, bronze medalist(s)	Vladimir Aleynik	Soviet Union	569.55
4	Liu Henglin	China	547.32
5	Mike Ryan	United States	545.91
6	Alex Bagiu	Romania	533.82
7	Chris Snode	United Kingdom	528.93
8	Dieter Dörr	West Germany	518.91
9	Lenny Layland	United States	493.53
10	Miguel Ángel Zavala	Mexico	491.13
11	Juan Carlos Ramírez	Cuba	484.56
12	César Henderson	Dominican Republic	468.48
14	David Snively	Canada	
18	John Nash	Canada	

Women's 3-Meter Springboard

Rank	Diver	Nation	Points
1st place, gold medalist(s)	Li Yihua	China	500.82
2nd place, silver medalist(s)	Megan Neyer	United States	498.66
3rd place, bronze medalist(s)	Ruxandra Hociotă	Romania	490.71
4	Olga Dmitrieva	Soviet Union	487.05
5	Milagros Gonzales	Cuba	479.61
6	Inna Sidorova	Soviet Union	470.46
7	Amy McGrath	United States	460.17
	Felicia Liliana Cîrstea	Romania	
	Eniko Kiefer	Canada	
	Valerie McFarlane	Australia	
	Meiquin Shi	China	
	Elsa Tenorio	Mexico	

Women's Platform

Rank	Diver	Nation	Points
1st place, gold medalist(s)	Chen Xiaoxia	China	471.72
2nd place, silver medalist(s)	Li Yihua	China	421.32
3rd place, bronze medalist(s)	Yelena Matyushenko	Soviet Union	421.23
4	Liana Tsotadze	Soviet Union	411.27
5	Debbie Rush	United States	398.49
6	Megan Neyer	United States	396.03
7	Felicia Liliana Cîrstea	Romania	384.00
8	Elizabeth Mackay	Canada	380.52
9	Valerie McFarlane	Australia	373.38
10	Lindsey Fraser	United Kingdom	352.77
11	Eniko Kiefer	Canada	347.49
