= Diving at the 1982 Commonwealth Games =

- Venue: Chandler Aquatic Centre
- Location: Brisbane, Australia
- Dates: 30 September to 9 October 1982

Diving at the 1982 Commonwealth Games was the 12th appearances of Diving at the Commonwealth Games. Competition featured four diving events and was held in Brisbane, Australia, from 30 September to 9 October 1982.

The events at the Games were held at the new Chandler Aquatic Centre that was part of the Sleeman Sports Complex, which had been purpose-built for the games.

Australia topped the medal table by virtue of winning two more silver medals than England.

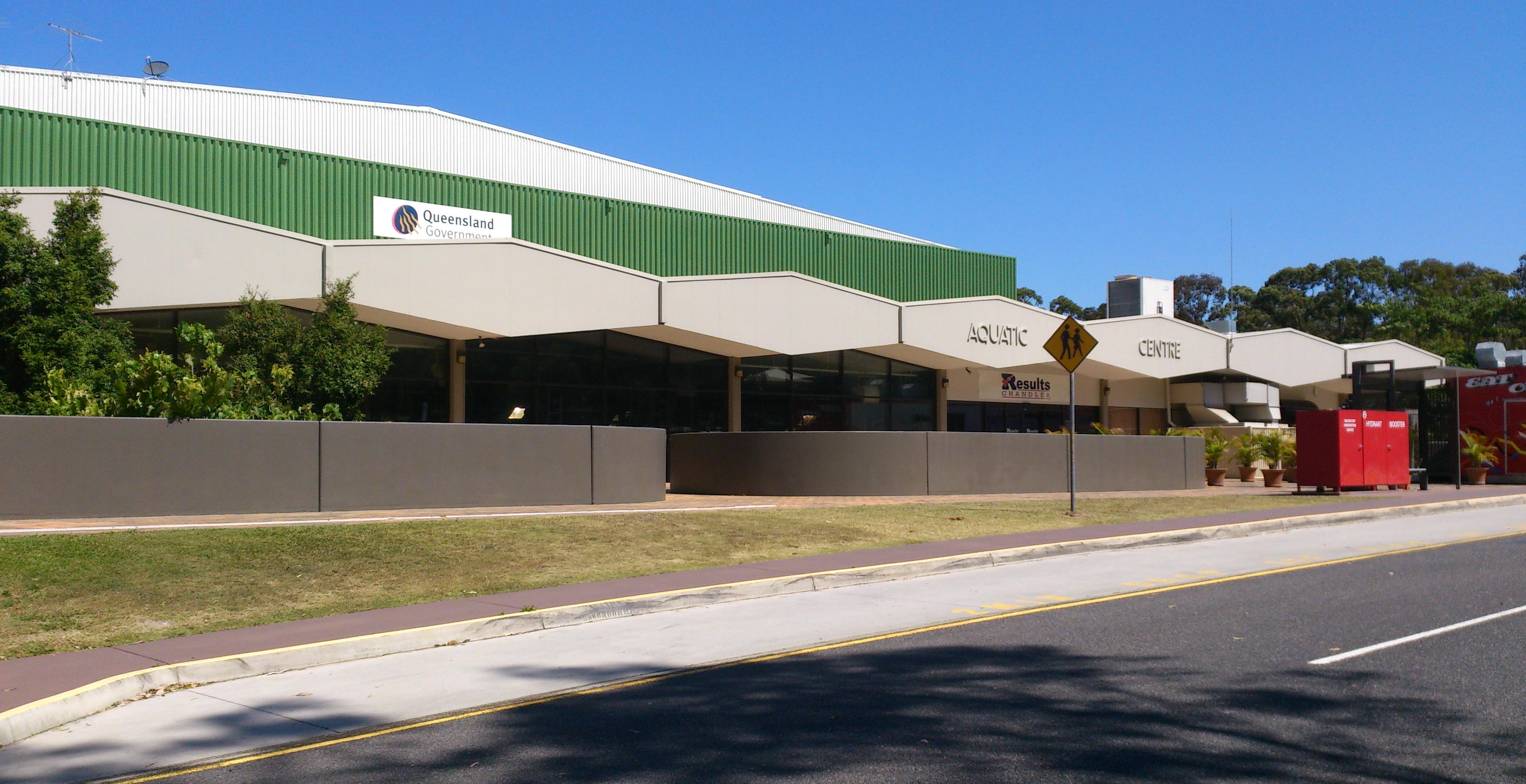
The Aquatic Centre exterior in 2017

== Medal table ==
* Host nation (Australia)

Rank	Nation	Gold	Silver	Bronze	Total
1	Australia*	2	2	1	5
2	England	2	0	0	2
3	Canada	0	2	2	4
4	New Zealand	0	0	1	1
Totals (4 entries)		4	4	4	12

== Medallists ==
Event	Gold	Silver	Bronze
3m springboard	Chris Snode (ENG)	Stephen Foley (AUS)	Mark Graham (NZL)
10m platform	Chris Snode (ENG)	Stephen Foley (AUS)	John Nash (CAN)
3m springboard	Jenny Donnet (AUS)	Sylvie Bernier (CAN)	Valerie Beddoe (AUS)
10m platform	Valerie Beddoe (AUS)	Jennifer McArton (CAN)	Kathy Keleman (CAN)

== Results ==
Men

=== 3 m springboard ===
Pos	Athlete	Time
1	(England) Chris Snode	631.38
2	(Australia) Steve Foley	592.08
3	(New Zealand) Mark Graham	551.46
4	(England) Nigel Stanton	530.40
5	(Canada) David Snively	529.32
6	(Canada) John Nash	526.86
7	(Australia) Shaun Ian Panayi	494.13
8	(New Zealand) Gary Lamb	463.32
9	(Canada) Benoit Seguin	446.46
10	(Wales) Bob Morgan	422.79
11	(Zimbabwe) Simon Draver	419.82
12	(Hong Kong) Billy Yang	353.85
13	(Hong Kong) Andrew Tang	321.90

=== 10 m platform ===
Pos	Athlete	Time
1	(England) Chris Snode	588.54
2	(Australia) Steve Foley	524.55
3	(Canada) John Nash	523.41
4	(England) Nigel Stanton	494.88
5	(Canada) Jeffrey Hirst	479.64
6	(Australia) Shaun Ian Panayi	471.00
7	(Australia) Andrew Jackomos	452.76
8	(Canada) David Snively	427.20
9	(Wales) Bob Morgan	372.18
10	(Hong Kong) Andrew Tang	296.61

Women

=== 3 m springboard ===
Pos	Athlete	Time
1	(Australia) Jenny Donnet	484.65
2	(Canada) Sylvie Bernier	478.83
3	(Australia) Valerie Beddoe	446.67
4	(Australia) Carol Gina Boots	417.09
5	(Zimbabwe) Antonette Wilken	414.27
6	(Canada) Debbie Fuller	400.74
7	(England) Sandra Yeates	393.45
8	(Zimbabwe) Lesley Smith	391.20
9	(Zimbabwe) Tracy Cox	385.71
10	(Canada) Kathy Kelemen	382.71
11	(New Zealand) Anne Fargher	377.55
12	(Scotland) Fiona Joan Hotson	368.31
13	(New Zealand) Kay Cummings	351.09
14	(Jersey) Tina Fage	330.36
15	(Scotland) Jane Ogden	296.40
16	(Hong Kong) Amy Lam	252.03

=== 10 m platform ===
Pos	Athlete	Time
1	(Australia) Valerie Beddoe	404.16
2	(Canada) Jennifer McArton	390.21
3	(Canada) Kathy Keleman	359.31
4	(Canada) Wendy Fuller	358.77
5	(Australia) Julie Kent	358.08
6	(England) Lindsey Fraser	345.39
7	(Australia) Carol Gina Boots	345.39
8	(New Zealand) Kay Cummings	301.08
9	(Scotland) Fiona Joan Hotson	298.23
10	(Zimbabwe) Tracy Cox	295.68
11	(Scotland) Jane Ogden	279.78
