= Diving at the 1980 Summer Olympics – Women's 3 metre springboard =

Women's 3 metre springboard at the Games of the XXII Olympiad

Medalists
1st place, gold medalist(s)		Irina Kalinina	Soviet Union
2nd place, silver medalist(s)		Martina Proeber	East Germany
3rd place, bronze medalist(s)		Karin Guthke	East Germany

The women's 3 metre springboard, also reported as springboard diving, was one of four diving events on the Diving at the 1980 Summer Olympics programme.

The competition was split into two phases:

1. Preliminary round (20 July)
  Divers performed ten dives. The eight divers with the highest scores advanced to the final.
2. Final (21 July)
  Divers performed another set of ten dives and the score here obtained was combined with half of the preliminary score to determine the final ranking.

== Results ==
Rank	Diver	Nation	Preliminary		Final			
Rank	Diver	Nation	Points	Rank	Points	Rank	½ Prel.	Total
1st place, gold medalist(s)	Irina Kalinina	Soviet Union	478.86	1	486.480	1	239.430	725.910
2nd place, silver medalist(s)	Martina Proeber	East Germany	450.99	3	473.400	2	225.495	698.895
3rd place, bronze medalist(s)	Karin Guthke	East Germany	435.21	4	467.640	3	217.605	685.245
4	Zhanna Tsyrulnikova	Soviet Union	454.35	2	446.490	5	227.175	673.665
5	Martina Jäschke	East Germany	427.47	6	454.380	4	213.735	668.115
6	Valerie McFarlane	Australia	413.97	7	444.060	6	206.985	651.045
7	Irina Sidorova	Soviet Union	432.57	5	433.980	8	216.285	650.265
8	Lourdes González	Cuba	409.65	8	435.180	7	204.825	640.005
9	Guadalupe Canseco	Mexico	407.52	9	did not advance			
10	Antonette Wilken	Zimbabwe	402.21	10	did not advance			
11	Susanne Wetteskog	Sweden	399.06	11	did not advance			
12	Ildikó Kelemen-Kovács	Hungary	391.68	12	did not advance			
13	Heidemarie Bártová	Czechoslovakia	390.39	13	did not advance			
14	Deborah Hill	Zimbabwe	390.27	14	did not advance			
15	Ruxandra Hociotă	Romania	389.10	15	did not advance			
16	Elsa Tenorio	Mexico	389.01	16	did not advance			
17	Carmen-Belen Nuñez	Spain	388.32	17	did not advance			
18	Jennifer Donnet	Australia	376.77	18	did not advance			
19	Sonia Fernández	Spain	370.95	19	did not advance			
20	Alison Drake	Great Britain	368.01	20	did not advance			
21	Annie Liljeberg	Sweden	365.25	21	did not advance			
22	Deborah Jay	Great Britain	362.73	22	did not advance			
23	Liliana Cîrstea	Romania	354.33	23	did not advance			
24	Isabelle Arène	France	345.06	24	did not advance			

== Sources ==
- The Official Report of the Games of the XXIInd Olympiad, Moscow 1980 – Volume 3: Participants and Results (pdf). Moscow: Fizkoultura i Sport Publishers. 1981. pp. p. 492.
