= Diving at the 1976 Summer Olympics – Men's 3 metre springboard =

Men's 3 metre springboard at the Games of the XXI Olympiad

Medalists
1st place, gold medalist(s)		Phil Boggs	United States
2nd place, silver medalist(s)		Franco Cagnotto	Italy
3rd place, bronze medalist(s)		Aleksandr Kosenkov	Soviet Union

The men's 3 metre springboard, also reported as springboard diving, was one of four diving events on the Diving at the 1976 Summer Olympics programme.

The competition was split into two phases:

1. Preliminary round (21 July)
  Divers performed eleven dives. The eight divers with the highest scores advanced to the final.
2. Final (22 July)
  Divers performed another set of eleven dives and the score here obtained determined the final ranking.

== Results ==
Rank	Diver	Nation	Preliminary		Final
Rank	Diver	Nation	Points	Rank	Points
1st place, gold medalist(s)	Phil Boggs	United States	621.51	1	619.05
2nd place, silver medalist(s)	Franco Cagnotto	Italy	542.31	7	570.48
3rd place, bronze medalist(s)	Aleksandr Kosenkov	Soviet Union	557.52	5	567.24
4	Falk Hoffmann	East Germany	573.00	3	553.53
5	Rob Cragg	United States	582.99	2	548.19
6	Greg Louganis	United States	530.85	8	528.96
7	Carlos Girón	Mexico	547.14	6	523.59
8	Klaus Dibiasi	Italy	572.82	4	516.18
9	Donald Wagstaff	Australia	529.11	9	Did not advance
10	Norbert Huda	West Germany	518.88	10	Did not advance
11	Boris Kozlov	Soviet Union	516.42	11	Did not advance
12	Vyacheslav Strakhov	Soviet Union	510.63	12	Did not advance
13	Frank Taubert	East Germany	493.68	13	Did not advance
14	Dieter Waskow	East Germany	491.70	14	Did not advance
15	Dieter Dörr	West Germany	491.40	15	Did not advance
16	Scott Cranham	Canada	485.97	16	Did not advance
17	Porfirio Becerril	Mexico	484.41	17	Did not advance
18	Chris Snode	Great Britain	479.79	18	Did not advance
19	Skip Phoenix	Canada	458.10	19	Did not advance
20	Trevor Simpson	Great Britain	450.81	20	Did not advance
21	Steve Foley	Australia	447.15	21	Did not advance
22	Claudio De Miro	Italy	446.61	22	Did not advance
23	Ken Armstrong	Canada	442.47	23	Did not advance
24	Alain Goosen	France	441.36	24	Did not advance
25	Ricardo Camacho	Spain	408.94	25	Did not advance
26	Sangwan Foengdee	Thailand	317.61	26	Did not advance
27	Sulaiman Qabazard	Kuwait	216.93	27	Did not advance
28	Ahmet Kizil	Turkey	205.68	28	Did not advance
-	Nelson Suarez	Ecuador	DNS	-	Did not advance
-	Jamal Al-Ghareeb	Kuwait	DNS	-	Did not advance

== Sources ==
- The Official Report for the Games of the XXIst Olympiad Montréal 1976 - Volume 3: Results (pdf). Ottawa: Organizing Committee for the Games of the XXIst Olympiad, Montréal 1976 (COJO 76). 1978. pp. p. 481.
