= List of Armenian Olympic medalists =

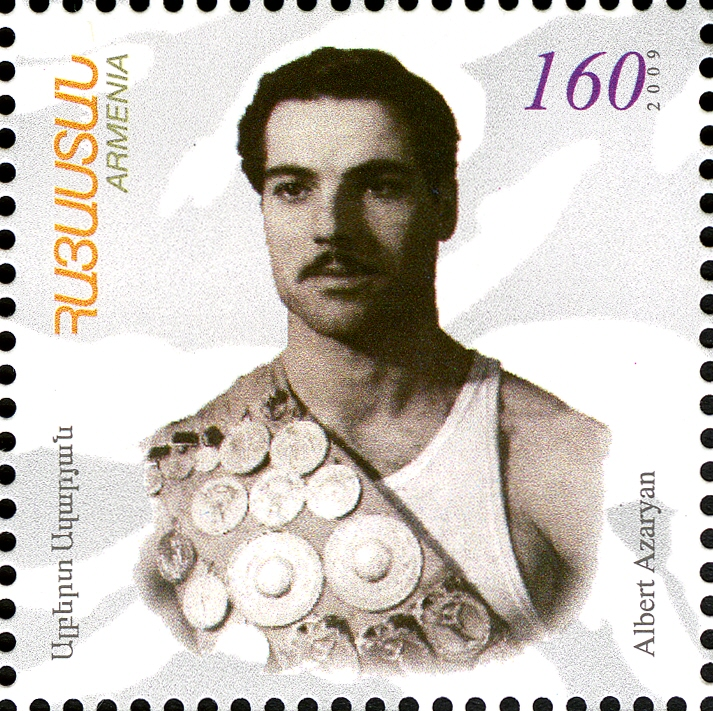
Soviet gymnast Albert Azaryan (pictured on a 2009 postage stamp) is the most decorated Armenian Olympian of all time with three gold and one silver medal.

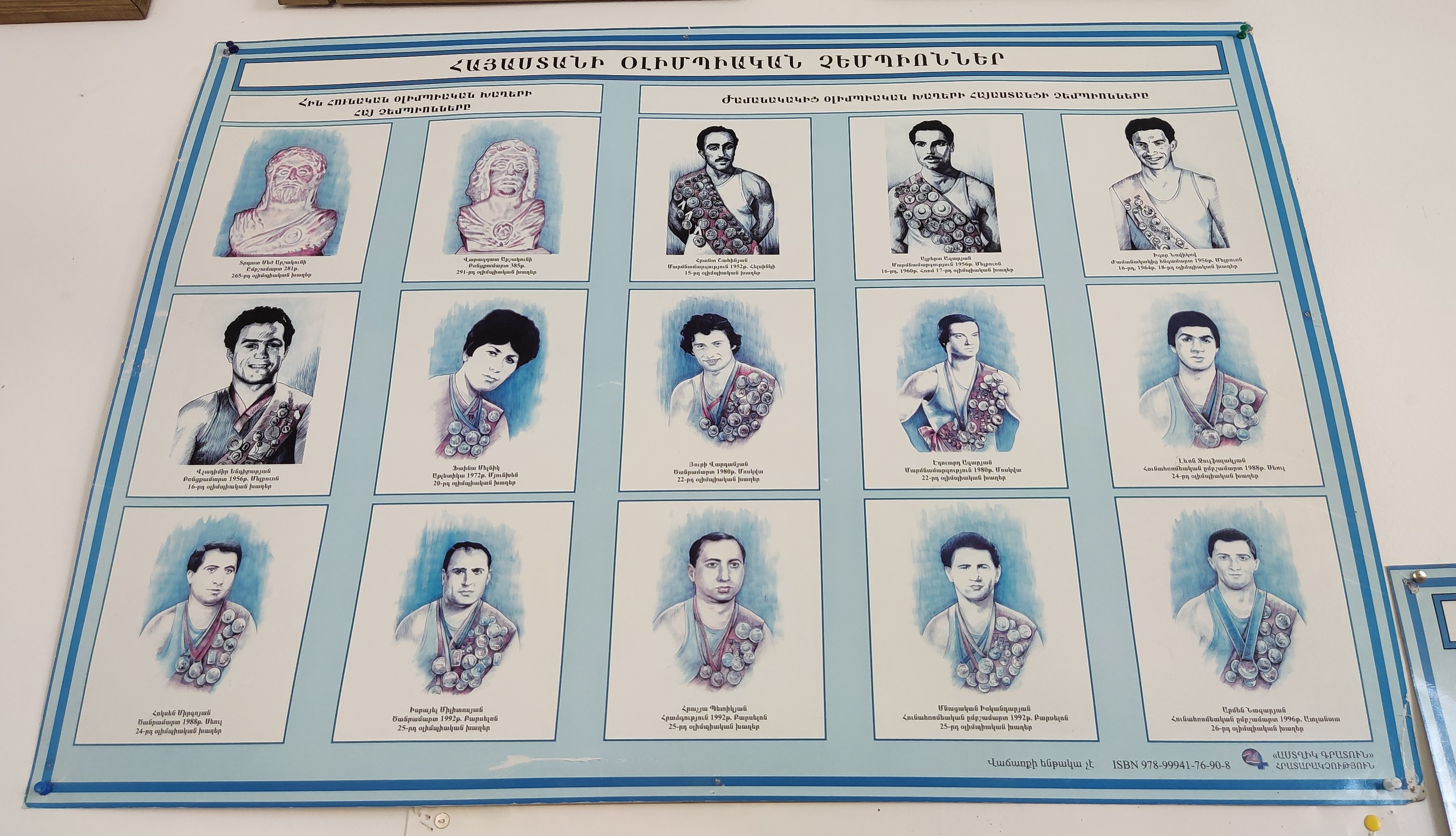
A poster at an Armenian public school depicting ancient and modern Armenian Olympic gold medalists

Historically, only a portion of ethnic Armenian athletes and athletes of Armenian descent have competed for Armenia in the Olympic Games. Classical Armenian historians attest that Armenian kings Tiridates III and Varazdat were recorded as champions in the Ancient Olympic Games. The first Armenians to participate in modern Olympics were athletes Mkrtich Mkryan and Vahram Papazyan, who represented the Ottoman Empire in the 1912. The first Armenian to win a medal was Hal Haig Prieste, a son of Armenian immigrants, who won a bronze medal in diving in the 1920 for the United States. Soviet Armenian gymnast Hrant Shahinyan became the first Armenian gold medalist of the modern Olympics in 1952.

From 1952 to 1988, most Armenian athletes represented the Soviet Union. Although Armenia became independent in 1991, it and other former Soviet states (except the Baltic states) were part of the Unified Team in 1992. The National Olympic Committee of Armenia was founded in 1990 and became an International Olympic Committee member in 1993. Since the 1994 Winter Olympics, Armenia participates separately. Some Armenian athletes, including ethnic Armenians born abroad and those who emigrated from Armenia, compete under other flags.

== Ancient Olympic Games ==
Although athletics never spread into Armenia in antiquity, two Armenian kings may have been champions in the ancient Olympic Games. According to Agathangelos (further corroborated by Movses Khorenatsi), one of the most prominent ancient Armenian kings, Tiridates III, who is best known for converting Armenia to Christianity in the early 4th century, was an Olympic champion prior to his reign. Modern scholars have calculated his victory in wrestling at the 265th Olympics in 281 AD, aged 22–23.

Later king Varazdat (Varazdates), also from the Arsacid dynasty, who reigned between 374 and 378, has been widely cited as the last Olympic victor known by name, with a victory in fisticuffs (boxing) (Note: Some authors have erroneously stated that Varazdat was an Olympic champion in wrestling or pentathlon.) in 385 AD. It is supported by a memorial plate at the museum in Olympia, Greece. Other authors have placed the event in 369, 365, or 393. According to Movses Khorenatsi, while a prince living at the court of Roman Emperor Valens in Constantinople, he won the "pugilistic contest" by killing lions. According to Remijsen, Varazdates is the highest up the social ladder of all late-antique athletes. His victory, however, has been questioned in recent decades. Young noted that his "supposed victory is attested only in a murky Armenian source" (Movses Khorenatsi). While Nina Garsoïan considered the purported victories of Tiridates and Varazdates "improbable" and "unlikely."

== Summer Olympics ==
Medal	Name	Country	Games	Sport	Event	Ref
Bronze	Hal Haig Prieste	United States	1920 Antwerp	Diving	Men's 10 metre platform	
Gold	Hrant Shahinyan	Soviet Union	1952 Helsinki	Gymnastics	Men's team all-around	
Silver	Hrant Shahinyan	Soviet Union	1952 Helsinki	Gymnastics	Men's individual all-around	
Gold	Hrant Shahinyan	Soviet Union	1952 Helsinki	Gymnastics	Men's rings	
Silver	Hrant Shahinyan	Soviet Union	1952 Helsinki	Gymnastics	Men's pommel horse	
Gold	Rafael Chimishkyan	Soviet Union	1952 Helsinki	Weightlifting	Men's Featherweight	
Bronze	Artem Teryan	Soviet Union	1952 Helsinki	Wrestling	Men's Greco-Roman Bantamweight	
Gold	Vladimir Yengibaryan	Soviet Union	1956 Melbourne	Boxing	Men's Light Welterweight	
Gold	Albert Azaryan	Soviet Union	1956 Melbourne	Gymnastics	Men's team all-around	
Gold	Albert Azaryan	Soviet Union	1956 Melbourne	Gymnastics	Men's Rings	
Gold	Nikita Simonyan	Soviet Union	1956 Melbourne	Football	Men's tournament	
Bronze	Boris Markarov	Soviet Union	1956 Melbourne	Water polo	Men's tournament	
Bronze	Igor Ter-Ovanesyan	Soviet Union	1960 Rome	Athletics	Men's long jump	
Gold	Albert Azaryan	Soviet Union	1960 Rome	Gymnastics	Men's rings	
Silver	Albert Azaryan	Soviet Union	1960 Rome	Gymnastics	Men's team all-around	
Bronze	Igor Ter-Ovanesyan	Soviet Union	1964 Tokyo	Athletics	Men's long jump	
Silver	Armenak Alachachian	Soviet Union	1964 Tokyo	Basketball	Men's basketball	
Gold	Norair Nurikyan	Bulgaria	1972 Munich	Weightlifting	Men's Featherweight	
Silver	Edvard Mikaelian	Soviet Union	1972 Munich	Gymnastics	Men's artistic team all-around	
Bronze	Arkady Andreasyan	Soviet Union	1972 Munich	Football	Men's tournament	
Bronze	Oganes Zanazanyan	Soviet Union	1972 Munich	Football	Men's tournament	
Gold	Norair Nurikyan	Bulgaria	1976 Montreal	Weightlifting	Men's Bantamweight	
Silver	Vardan Militosyan	Soviet Union	1976 Montreal	Weightlifting	Men's middleweight	
Silver	Nelson Davidyan	Soviet Union	1976 Montreal	Wrestling	Men's Greco-Roman 62 kg	
Gold	Suren Nalbandyan	Soviet Union	1976 Montreal	Wrestling	Men's Greco-Roman 68 kg	
Bronze	Anushavan Gassan-Dzhalilov	Soviet Union	1976 Montreal	Rowing	Men's coxless fours	
Silver	Nina Muradyan	Soviet Union	1976 Montreal	Volleyball	Women's tournament	
Bronze	David Torosyan	Soviet Union	1976 Montreal	Boxing	Men's Flyweight	
Silver	Yurik Sarkisyan	Soviet Union	1980 Moscow	Weightlifting	Men's 56 kg	
Gold	Eduard Azaryan	Soviet Union	1980 Moscow	Gymnastics	Men's artistic team all-around	
Silver	Sirvard Emirzyan	Soviet Union	1980 Moscow	Diving	Women's 10 metre platform	
Bronze	Ashot Karagyan	Soviet Union	1980 Moscow	Fencing	Men's team foil	
Gold	Yurik Vardanyan	Soviet Union	1980 Moscow	Weightlifting	Men's 82.5 kg	
Bronze	David Ambartsumyan	Soviet Union	1980 Moscow	Diving	Men's 10 metre platform	
Silver	Ashot Karagyan	Soviet Union	1980 Moscow	Fencing	Men's team épée	
Bronze	Bernard Tchoullouyan	France	1980 Moscow	Judo	Men's Half Middleweight	
Bronze	Sos Hayrapetyan	Soviet Union	1980 Moscow	Field hockey	Men's tournament	
Gold	Sanasar Oganisyan	Soviet Union	1980 Moscow	Wrestling	Men's freestyle 90 kg	
Bronze	Khoren Hovhannisyan	Soviet Union	1980 Moscow	Football	Men's tournament	
Gold	Oksen Mirzoyan	Soviet Union	1988 Seoul	Weightlifting	Men's Bantamweight	
Silver	Israel Militosyan	Soviet Union	1988 Seoul	Weightlifting	Men's Lightweight	
Gold	Levon Julfalakyan	Soviet Union	1988 Seoul	Wrestling	Men's Greco-Roman 68 kg	
Silver	Heorhiy Pohosov	Soviet Union	1988 Seoul	Fencing	Men's team sabre	
Silver	Stepan Sarkisyan	Soviet Union	1988 Seoul	Wrestling	Men's freestyle 62 kg	
Bronze	Manuela Maleeva	Bulgaria	1988 Seoul	Tennis	Women's Singles	
Silver	Alfred Ter-Mkrtchyan	(International Olympic Committee) Unified Team	1992 Barcelona	Wrestling	Men's Greco-Roman 52 kg	
Gold	Mnatsakan Iskandaryan	(International Olympic Committee) Unified Team	1992 Barcelona	Wrestling	Men's Greco-Roman 74 kg	
Gold	Israel Militosyan	(International Olympic Committee) Unified Team	1992 Barcelona	Weightlifting	Men's Lightweight–67.5 kg	
Gold	Hrachya Petikyan	(International Olympic Committee) Unified Team	1992 Barcelona	Shooting	Men's 50 metre rifle three positions	
Gold	Elen Shakirova	(International Olympic Committee) Unified Team	1992 Barcelona	Basketball	Women's tournament	
Gold	Heorhiy Pohosov	(International Olympic Committee) Unified Team	1992 Barcelona	Fencing	Men's team sabre	
Gold	Armen Nazaryan	Armenia	1996 Atlanta	Wrestling	Men's Greco-Roman Flyweight	
Silver	Armen Bagdasarov	Uzbekistan	1996 Atlanta	Judo	Men's Middleweight	
Bronze	Karina Aznavourian	Russia	1996 Atlanta	Fencing	Women's team épée	
Silver	Armen Mkrtchyan	Armenia	1996 Atlanta	Wrestling	Men's Freestyle Light Flyweight	
Gold	Andre Agassi	United States	1996 Atlanta	Tennis	Men's singles	
Gold	Karina Aznavourian	Russia	2000 Sydney	Fencing	Women's team épée	
Silver	Benjamin Varonian	France	2000 Sydney	Gymnastics	Men's horizontal bar	
Bronze	Arsen Melikyan	Armenia	2000 Sydney	Weightlifting	Men's Middleweight–77 kg	
Gold	Varteres Samurgashev	Russia	2000 Sydney	Wrestling	Men's Greco-Roman 63 kg	
Gold	Armen Nazaryan	Bulgaria	2000 Sydney	Wrestling	Men's Greco-Roman flyweight–58 kg	
Gold	Pavel Sukosyan	Russia	2000 Sydney	Handball	Men's tournament	
Gold	Karina Aznavourian	Russia	2004 Athens	Fencing	Women's team épée	
Bronze	Artiom Kiouregkian	Greece	2004 Athens	Wrestling	Men's Greco-Roman 55 kg	
Silver	Ara Abrahamian	Sweden	2004 Athens	Wrestling	Men's Greco-Roman 84 kg	
Silver	Dimitra Asilian	Greece	2004 Athens	Water polo	Women's competition	
Bronze	Mkhitar Manukyan	Kazakhstan	2004 Athens	Wrestling	Men's Greco-Roman 66 kg	
Bronze	Armen Nazaryan	Bulgaria	2004 Athens	Wrestling	Men's Greco-Roman 60 kg	
Bronze	Varteres Samurgashev	Russia	2004 Athens	Wrestling	Men's Greco-Roman 74 kg	
Bronze	Tigran G. Martirosyan	Armenia	2008 Beijing	Weightlifting	Men's Middleweight (69 kg)	
Bronze	Armen Vardanyan	Ukraine	2008 Beijing	Wrestling	Men's Greco-Roman 66 kg	
Bronze	Gevorg Davtyan	Armenia	2008 Beijing	Weightlifting	Men's Middleweight (77 kg)	
Bronze	Tigran V. Martirosyan	Armenia	2008 Beijing	Weightlifting	Men's Middleweight (85 kg)	
Gold	Artur Ayvazyan	Ukraine	2008 Beijing	Shooting	Men's 50 metre rifle prone	
Gold	Biurakn Hakhverdian	Netherlands	2008 Beijing	Water polo	Women's competition	
Bronze	Hrachik Javakhyan	Armenia	2008 Beijing	Boxing	Men's Lightweight	
Gold	Arsen Galstyan	Russia	2012 London	Judo	Men's extra-lightweight–60 kg	
Gold	Anna Chicherova	Russia	2012 London	Athletics	Women's high jump	
Bronze	Hripsime Khurshudyan	Armenia	2012 London	Weightlifting	Women's +75 kg	
Silver	Arsen Julfalakyan	Armenia	2012 London	Wrestling	Men's Greco-Roman–74 kg	
Bronze	Artur Aleksanyan	Armenia	2012 London	Wrestling	Men's Greco-Roman–96 kg	
Bronze	David Ayrapetyan	Russia	2012 London	Boxing	Men's light flyweight–49 kg	
Gold	Olga Akopyan	Russia	2016 Rio	Handball	Women's sabre	
Gold	Yana Egorian	Russia	2016 Rio	Fencing	Women's sabre	
Silver	Seda Tutkhalyan	Russia	2016 Rio	Gymnastics	Women's artistic team all-around	
Bronze	Kirill Grigoryan	Russia	2016 Rio	Shooting	Men's 50 metre rifle prone	
Gold	Yana Egorian	Russia	2016 Rio	Fencing	Women's team sabre	
Silver	Simon Martirosyan	Armenia	2016 Rio	Weightlifting	Men's 105 kg	
Silver	Mihran Harutyunyan	Armenia	2016 Rio	Wrestling	Men's Greco-Roman 66 kg	
Gold	Artur Aleksanyan	Armenia	2016 Rio	Wrestling	Men's Greco-Roman 98 kg	
Silver	Gor Minasyan	Armenia	2016 Rio	Weightlifting	Men's +105 kg	
Bronze	Artem Harutyunyan	Germany	2016 Rio	Boxing	Men's light welterweight 64 kg	
Gold	Artur Dalaloyan	ROC	2020 Tokyo	Gymnastics	Men's artistic team all-around	
Silver	Karen Khachanov	ROC	2020 Tokyo	Tennis	Men's singles	
Bronze	Artur Davtyan	Armenia	2020 Tokyo	Gymnastics	Men's Vault	
Silver	Artur Aleksanyan	Armenia	2020 Tokyo	Wrestling	Men's Greco-Roman 97 kg	
Silver	Simon Martirosyan	Armenia	2020 Tokyo	Weightlifting	Men's 109 kg	
Bronze	Hovhannes Bachkov	Armenia	2020 Tokyo	Boxing	Men's lightweight	
Gold	Mariya Lasitskene	ROC	2020 Tokyo	Athletics	Women's high jump	
Silver	Artur Davtyan	Armenia	2024 Paris	Gymnastics	Man's vault	
Silver	Artur Aleksanyan	Armenia	2024 Paris	Wrestling	Men's Greco-Roman 97 kg	
Silver	Varazdat Lalayan	Armenia	2024 Paris	Weightlifting	Men's +102 kg	
Bronze	Gor Minasyan	Bahrain	2024 Paris	Weightlifting	Men's +102 kg	

=== By games ===
Games	Gold	Silver	Bronze	Total
1920 Antwerp	0	0	1	1
1952 Helsinki	3	2	1	6
1956 Melbourne	4	0	0	4
1960 Rome	1	1	1	3
1964 Tokyo	0	1	1	2
1972 Munich	1	1	2	4
1976 Montreal	2	3	2	7
1980 Moscow	3	3	5	11
1988 Seoul	2	3	1	6
1992 Barcelona	5	1	0	6
1996 Atlanta	2	2	1	5
2000 Sydney	4	1	1	6
2004 Athens	1	2	4	7
2008 Beijing	2	0	5	7
2012 London	1	1	3	5
2016 Rio	4	4	2	10
2020 Tokyo	1	3	2	6
2024 Paris	0	3	1	4
Totals (18 entries)	36	31	33	100

=== By sport ===
Sport	Gold	Silver	Bronze	Total
Wrestling	8	9	7	24
Gymnastics	7	7	1	15
Weightlifting	6	7	6	19
Fencing	5	2	2	9
Shooting	2	0	1	3
Handball	2	0	0	2
Judo	1	1	1	3
Tennis	1	1	1	3
Basketball	1	1	0	2
Water polo	1	1	0	2
Boxing	1	0	5	6
Football	1	0	3	4
Diving	0	1	2	3
Volleyball	0	1	0	1
Athletics	0	0	2	2
Field hockey	0	0	1	1
Rowing	0	0	1	1
Totals (17 entries)	36	31	33	100

=== By country ===
Country	Gold	Silver	Bronze	Total
Soviet Union	14	14	11	39
Russia	8	1	4	13
(International Olympic Committee) Unified Team	5	1	0	6
Bulgaria	3	0	2	5
Armenia	2	10	9	21
ROC	1	1	0	2
Ukraine	1	0	1	2
United States	1	0	1	2
Netherlands	1	0	0	1
France	0	1	1	2
Greece	0	1	1	2
Sweden	0	1	0	1
Uzbekistan	0	1	0	1
Bahrain	0	0	1	1
Germany	0	0	1	1
Kazakhstan	0	0	1	1
Totals (16 entries)	36	31	33	100

=== Disqualified athletes ===
- Ashot Danielyan of Armenia was stripped of his medal and suspended following a positive drug test after winning a bronze medal at the 2000 Sydney Games in Men's +105 kg Weightlifting.
- Ara Abrahamian of Sweden was disqualified after winning a bronze medal at the 2008 Beijing Games in Men's Greco-Roman 84 kg Wrestling due to "violating the spirit of fair play."

== Winter Olympics ==
Medal	Name	Country	Games	Sport	Event	Ref
Gold	Grigory Mkrtychan	Soviet Union	1956 Cortina d'Ampezzo	Ice hockey	Men's tournament	
Gold	Vicki Movsessian	United States	1998 Nagano	Ice hockey	Women's tournament	
Silver	Evgenia Medvedeva	OAR	2018 Pyeongchang	Figure skating	Team event	
Silver	Evgenia Medvedeva	OAR	2018 Pyeongchang	Figure skating	Ladies' singles	

=== By games ===
Games	Gold	Silver	Bronze	Total
1956 Cortina d'Ampezzo	1	0	0	1
1998 Nagano	1	0	0	1
2018 Pyeongchang	0	2	0	2
Total	2	2	0	4

=== By sport ===
Sport	Gold	Silver	Bronze	Total
Ice hockey	2	0	0	2
Figure skating	0	2	0	2
Totals (2 entries)	2	2	0	4

=== By country ===
Sport	Gold	Silver	Bronze	Total
Soviet Union	1	0	0	1
United States	1	0	0	1
OAR	0	2	0	2
Totals (3 entries)	2	2	0	4

== Armenian coaches ==
- Adam Krikorian, the head coach of the United States women's national water polo team, which won gold medals at the 2012, 2016, and 2020 Olympics.
- Brian Goorjian, the head coach of the Australia men's national basketball team, which won a bronze medal at the 2020 Olympics.
- Rafael Arutyunyan, coach of Nathan Chen

== See also ==
- Armenia at the Olympics

== Bibliography ==
- Parsadanyan, Albert (2003). Գիտելիքների շտեմարան [Knowledge Warehouse] (in Armenian). Vol. 1. Yerevan: VMV-Print. pp. 152–158. ISBN 99930-960-4-0. [a list of ethnic Armenian medalists up to 2000]
- Ispirian, M.S. [in Armenian] (2000). "Հայ մարզիկների մասնակցությունը հին հունական օլիմպիական խաղերին [Participation of Armenian sportsmen in Old Olympic Games]". Lraber Hasarakakan Gitutyunneri (in Armenian) (1). Yerevan: Armenian Academy of Sciences: 189–196. Archived from the original on 2019-03-29.
- Remijsen, Sofie (2015). The End of Greek Athletics in Late Antiquity. Cambridge University Press. ISBN 9781107050785.
