= Diving at the 1980 Summer Olympics – Men's 10 metre platform =

Men's 10 metre platform at the Games of the XXII Olympiad

Medalists
1st place, gold medalist(s)		Falk Hoffmann	East Germany
2nd place, silver medalist(s)		Vladimir Aleynik	Soviet Union
3rd place, bronze medalist(s)		David Ambartsumyan	Soviet Union

The men's 10 metre platform, also reported as platform diving, was one of four diving events on the Diving at the 1980 Summer Olympics programme.

The competition was split into two phases:

1. Preliminary round (27 July)
  Divers performed ten dives. The eight divers with the highest scores advanced to the final.
2. Final (28 July)
  Divers performed another set of ten dives and the score here obtained was combined with half of the preliminary score to determine the final ranking.

== Results ==
Rank	Diver	Nation	Preliminary		Final			
Rank	Diver	Nation	Points	Rank	Points	Rank	½ Prel.	Total
1st place, gold medalist(s)	Falk Hoffmann	East Germany	546.12	1	562.590	1	273.060	835.650
2nd place, silver medalist(s)	Vladimir Aleynik	Soviet Union	539.07	2	550.170	4	269.535	819.705
3rd place, bronze medalist(s)	David Ambartsumyan	Soviet Union	518.82	4	558.030	2	259.410	817.440
4	Carlos Girón	Mexico	515.37	5	552.120	3	257.685	809.805
5	Dieter Waskow	East Germany	515.16	6	545.220	5	257.580	802.800
6	Thomas Knuths	East Germany	521.01	3	523.470	7	260.505	783.975
7	Sergey Nemtsanov	Soviet Union	487.20	8	532.260	6	243.600	775.860
8	Niki Stajković	Austria	493.89	7	478.200	8	246.945	725.145
9	Christopher Snode	Great Britain	468.21	9	did not advance			
10	Claus Thomsen	Denmark	467.76	10	did not advance			
11	Salvador Sobrino	Mexico	456.87	11	did not advance			
12	Kenneth Grove	Austria	447.12	12	did not advance			
13	Alexandru Adrian Bagiu	Romania	436.02	13	did not advance			
14	Némedi Károly	Hungary	429.75	14	did not advance			
15	Francisco Rueda	Mexico	428.52	15	did not advance			
16	Steve Foley	Australia	427.44	16	did not advance			
17	Radoslav Radev	Bulgaria	406.89	17	did not advance			
18	Petar Georgiev	Bulgaria	391.32	18	did not advance			
19	Martyn Brown	Great Britain	380.91	19	did not advance			
20	Milton Machado	Brazil	373.06	20	did not advance			
21	César Jiménez	Dominican Republic	369.09	21	did not advance			
22	David Parrington	Zimbabwe	356.76	22	did not advance			
23	Abdullah Mayouf	Kuwait	326.34	23	did not advance			

== Sources ==
- The Official Report of the Games of the XXIInd Olympiad, Moscow 1980 - Volume 3: Participants and Results (pdf). Moscow: Fizkoultura i Sport Publishers. 1981. pp. p. 490.
