= Diving at the 1980 Summer Olympics – Women's 10 metre platform =

Women's 10 metre platform at the Games of the XXII Olympiad

Medalists
1st place, gold medalist(s)		Martina Jäschke	East Germany
2nd place, silver medalist(s)		Servard Emirzian	Soviet Union
3rd place, bronze medalist(s)		Liana Tsotadze	Soviet Union

The women's 10 metre platform, also reported as platform diving, was one of four diving events on the Diving at the 1980 Summer Olympics programme.

The competition was split into two phases:

1. Preliminary round (25 July)
  Divers performed eight dives. The eight divers with the highest scores advanced to the final.
2. Final (26 July)
  Divers performed another set of eight dives and the score here obtained was combined with half of the preliminary score to determine the final ranking.

== Results ==
Rank	Diver	Nation	Preliminary		Final			
Rank	Diver	Nation	Points	Rank	Points	Rank	½ Prel.	Total
1st place, gold medalist(s)	Martina Jäschke	East Germany	359.88	4	416.310	1	179.940	596.250
2nd place, silver medalist(s)	Sirvard Emirzyan	Soviet Union	381.99	1	385.470	3	190.945	576.465
3rd place, bronze medalist(s)	Liana Tsotadze	Soviet Union	360.87	2	395.490	2	180.435	575.925
4	Ramona Wenzel	East Germany	358.86	5	362.640	5	179.430	542.070
5	Yelena Matyushenko	Soviet Union	351.00	6	364.680	4	175.500	540.180
6	Elsa Tenorio	Mexico	360.03	3	359.430	6	180.015	539.445
7	Valerie McFarlane	Australia	333.57	7	333.000	7	166.785	499.785
8	Ildikó Kelemen	Hungary	323.85	8	314.610	8	161.925	476.535
9	Kerstin Krause	East Germany	322.68	9	did not advance			
10	Guadalupe Canseco	Mexico	316.89	10	did not advance			
11	Susanne Wetteskog	Sweden	315.30	11	did not advance			
12	Dana Chmelařová	Czechoslovakia	309.12	12	did not advance			
13	Ewa Kucińska	Poland	308.88	13	did not advance			
14	Marion Saunders	Great Britain	290.82	14	did not advance			
15	Lindsey Fraser	Great Britain	277.08	15	did not advance			
16	Antonette Wilken	Zimbabwe	274.35	16	did not advance			
17	Jennifer Donnet	Australia	264.00	17	did not advance			
–	Annie Liljeberg	Sweden	DNS	–	did not advance			

== Sources ==
- The Official Report of the Games of the XXIInd Olympiad, Moscow 1980 - Volume 3: Participants and Results (pdf). Moscow: Fizkoultura i Sport Publishers. 1981. pp. p. 494.
