= Diving at the 1978 Commonwealth Games =

- Venue: Kinsmen Aquatic Centre
- Location: Edmonton, Canada
- Dates: 4 to 9 August 1978
- Nations: 6

Diving at the 1978 Commonwealth Games was the 11th appearance of the Diving at the Commonwealth Games. The events were held in Edmonton, Canada, from 2 4 to 9 August 1978 and featured contests in four events.

The events were held at the Kinsmen Aquatic Centre, part of the Kinsmen Sports Centre complex. The aquatic centre was constructed in 1976 specifically for the Games.

Canada, as host nation, won the most medals, taking 8, of which 2 were gold. They had a clean sweep of all medals in the women's 3 metre springboard event.

Originally, Linda Cuthbert qualified for the springboard event and Beverly Boys qualified for the high board platform, but decided on a late swap to increase their chances of success. The youngest competitor from Canada competing in the commonwealth games was 18-year-old diver David Snively, then considered "one of Canada's top divers". In the women's 3 metre springboard event, Janet Nutter led all the competitors after the first six dives with 264.27 points, despite battling a cold and laryngitis.

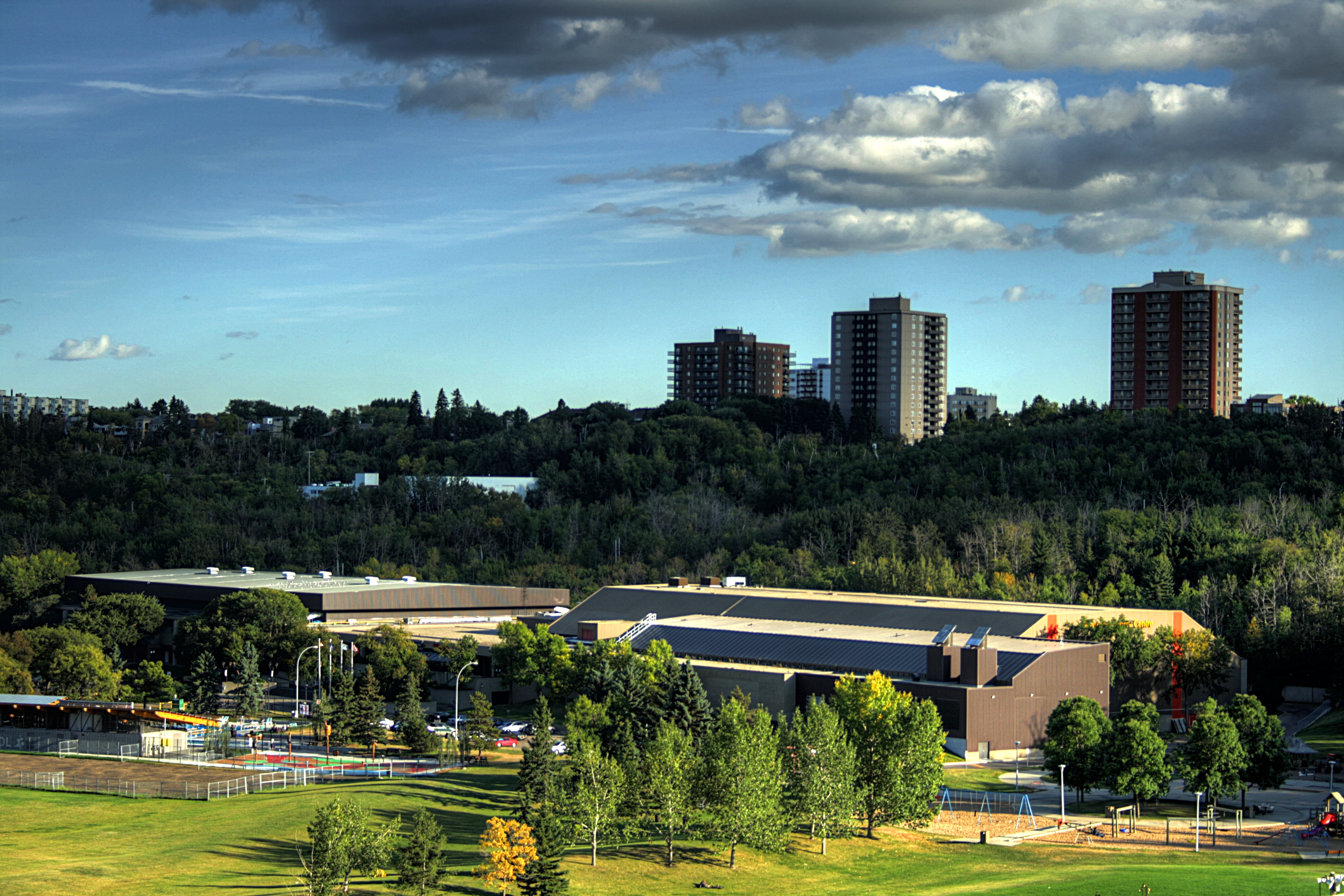
The aquatic centre (on the left) was constructed in 1976

== Medal table ==
* Host nation (Canada)

Rank	Nation	Gold	Silver	Bronze	Total
1	Canada*	2	3	3	8
2	England	2	0	0	2
3	Australia	0	1	1	2
Totals (3 entries)		4	4	4	12

== Medalists ==
Event	Gold		Silver		Bronze	
Men
3 Metres Springboard	Chris Snode; England	643.83	Scott Cranham; Canada	595.53	Don Wagstaff; Australia	572.16
10 Metres High board [Platform]	Chris Snode; England	538.98	Ken Armstrong; Canada	534.99	Scott Cranham; Canada	512.37
Women
3 Metres Springboard	Janet Nutter; Canada	477.33	Beverly Boys; Canada	469.65	Eniko Kiefer; Canada	447.42
10 Metres High board [Platform]	Linda Cuthbert; Canada	397.44	Valerie McFarlane; Australia	383.4	Janet Nutter; Canada	374.67

== Results ==
=== Men ===
3 metre springboard
Rank	Name	Score
	Chris Snode (ENG)	643.83
	Scott Cranham (CAN)	595.53
	Don Wagstaff (AUS)	572.16
4	Ken Armstrong (CAN)	534.36
5	Andrew Jackomos (AUS)	501.90
6	Steve Foley (AUS)	490.41
7	Martyn Brown (ENG)	482.64
8	David Snively (CAN)	471.24

10 metre high board
Rank	Name	Score
	Chris Snode (ENG)	538.98
	Ken Armstrong (CAN)	534.99
	Scott Cranham (CAN)	512.37
4	David Snively (CAN)	499.11
5	Andrew Jackomos (AUS)	498.09
6	Donald Wagstaff (AUS)	488.79
7	Steve Foley (AUS)	466.77
8	Martyn Brown (ENG)	458.88
9	Fraser McBlane (SCO)	334.92
10	Ronald Hurst (SCO)	327.81
11	Vasant Gadge (IND)	274.92

=== Women ===
3 metre springboard
Rank	Name	Score
	Janet Nutter (CAN)	477.33
	Beverly Boys (CAN)	469.65
	Eniko Kiefer (CAN)	447.42
4	Alison Drake-Jankowska (ENG)	397.17
5	Valerie McFarlane (AUS)	384.30
6	Fiona Hotson (SCO)	354.03
7	Anne Fargher (NZL)	341.16

10 metre high board
Rank	Name	Score
	Linda Cuthbert (CAN)	397.44
	Valerie McFarlane (AUS)	383.40
	Janet Nutter (CAN)	374.67
4	Elizabeth Mackay (CAN)	372.42
5	Marion Saunders (ENG)	330.57
6	Fiona Hotson (SCO)	273.66
