= Chmelar =

Chmelař (feminine: Chmelařová) is a Czech surname. Chmelár (feminine: Chmelárová) is a Slovak surname. They are derived from the Czech word chmel and the Slovak word chmeľ (i.e. 'hops') and mean 'hop grower', 'hop picker'. Notable people with the surname include:

- Aleš Chmelař (born 1987), Czech politician
- Dana Chmelařová (born 1960), Czech diver
- Fanny Chmelar (born 1985), German alpine skier
- Jan Chmelar (born 1981), Swedish ice hockey player
- Jaroslav Chmelař (born 2003), Czech ice hockey player
