= Ruxandra =

Ruxandra is a Romanian feminine given name of Persian origin. Notable bearers of the name include:

- Ruxandra Cesereanu (born 1963), Romanian poet and writer
- Ruxandra Donose (born 1964), Romanian opera singer
- Ruxandra Dragomir (born 1972), Romanian tennis player
- Ruxandra Dumitrescu (born 1977), Romanian volleyball player
- Ruxandra Hociotă (born 1959), Romanian diver
- Ruxandra Lăpușneanu (1538–1570), princess consort of Moldavia
- Ruxandra Nedelcu (born 1984), Romanian freestyle skier
- Ruxandra Popa (born 1987), Romanian model and beauty queen
- Ruxandra Porojnicu (born 1993), Romanian actress
- Ruxandra Sireteanu (1945–2008), Romanian biophysicist and neuroscientist
