= Barbara Weinstein =

Barbara Weinstein may refer to:

- Barbara Weinstein (diver), American diver
- Barbara Weinstein (historian) (born 1952), American historian
