= Matyushenko =

Matyushenko, also transliterated Matiushenko or Matjušenko (Ukrainian: Матюшенко; Belarusian: Мацюшэнка, Matsiushenka/Maciušenka) is a surname. Notable people with the surname include:

- Mykhailo Matiushenko (1961–2022), Ukrainian Air Force colonel
- Vladimir Matyushenko (born 1971), Belarusian mixed martial artist
- Yelena Matyushenko (born 1961), Soviet diver
