= Sonia Fernández =

Spanish diver

Personal information
- Nationality: Spanish
- Born: 20 October 1966 (age 59) Madrid, Spain

Sport
- Sport: Diving
Medal record
Representing Spain
Mediterranean Games
Bronze medal – third place	1979 Split	3m springboard

Sonia Fernández Díaz (born 20 October 1966) is a Spanish diver. She competed in the women's 3 metre springboard event at the 1980 Summer Olympics.
