= Tatyana Podmaryova =

Soviet diver

Personal information
- Nationality: Soviet
- Born: 29 November 1958 (age 67)

Sport
- Sport: Diving
Medal record
Women's diving
Representing Soviet Union
Universiade
Silver medal – second place	1977 Sofia	Springboard

Tatyana Podmaryova (born 29 November 1958) is a Soviet diver. She competed in the women's 3 metre springboard event at the 1976 Summer Olympics.
