= Aleksandr Kosenkov =

Belarusian Olympic diver

Personal information
- Born: 28 July 1956 (age 69)

Sport
- Country: Soviet Union
- Sport: Diving
Medal record
Men's diving
Representing the Soviet Union
Olympic Games
Bronze medal – third place	1976 Montreal	3 m springboard
European Championships
Bronze medal – third place	1977 Jönköping	3 m springboard
Universiade
Gold medal – first place	1979 Mexico City	3 m springboard
Bronze medal – third place	1977 Sofia	3 m springboard

Aleksandr Kosenkov (born 28 July 1956) is a Belarusian former diver who competed in the 1976 Summer Olympics and in the 1980 Summer Olympics.
