= Rob Cragg =

American diver

Personal information
- Nationality: American
- Born: September 26, 1953 (age 72) Abington, Pennsylvania, United States

Sport
- Sport: Diving

Rob Cragg (born September 26, 1953) is an American diver. He competed in the men's 3 metre springboard event at the 1976 Summer Olympics.
