= Vyacheslav Troshin =

Russian diver

Personal information
- Nationality: Russian
- Born: 22 May 1959 (age 67) Saratov, Russia

Sport
- Sport: Diving
Medal record
Men's diving
Representing the Soviet Union
European Championships
Silver medal – second place	1983 Rome	10 m platform
Universiade
Silver medal – second place	1977 Sofia	10 m platform
Silver medal – second place	1981 Bucharest	10 m platform

Vyacheslav Troshin (born 22 May 1959) is a Russian diver. He competed in the men's 3 metre springboard event at the 1980 Summer Olympics.
