= Skip Phoenix =

Canadian diver

Personal information
- Nationality: Canadian
- Born: 19 August 1948 (age 77) Addis Ababa, Ethiopia

Sport
- Sport: Diving

Skip Phoenix (born 19 August 1948) is a Canadian diver. He competed in the men's 3 metre springboard event at the 1976 Summer Olympics.
