= Janet Nutter =

Canadian diver (born 1953)

Personal information
- Born: April 2, 1953 (age 73) Montreal, Quebec
Medal record
Women's diving
Representing Canada
Pan American Games
Gold medal – first place	1975 Mexico City	Platform
Bronze medal – third place	1979 San Juan	Springboard
Commonwealth Games
Gold medal – first place	1978 Edmonton	Springboard
Bronze medal – third place	1978 Edmonton	Platform
Universiade
Bronze medal – third place	1977 Sofia	Springboard

Janet Ruth Nutter (born April 2, 1953) is a retired diver from Canada, who was supposed to represent her native country at the 1980 Summer Olympics, but failed to do so after the boycott. A resident of Thornhill, Ontario she twice won a medal at the Pan American Games (1975 and 1979), and two medals (gold and bronze) at the 1978 Commonwealth Games.

She was one of four Canadian athletes chosen by director Paul Cowan to appear in the National Film Board of Canada documentary Going the Distance, about the 1978 Games in Edmonton.

Nutter was inducted into the Manitoba Sports Hall of Fame and Museum in 1986.
