= Deborah Jay =

British diver

Personal information
- Nationality: British
- Born: 24 October 1961 (age 63)

Sport
- Sport: Diving

Deborah Jay (born 24 October 1961) is a British diver. She competed in the women's 3 metre springboard event at the 1980 Summer Olympics.
