= Lourdes González =

Cuban diver (born 1962)

Personal information
- Nationality: Cuban
- Born: 30 May 1962 (age 63)

Sport
- Sport: Diving

Lourdes González (born 30 May 1962) is a Cuban diver. She competed in the women's 3 metre springboard event at the 1980 Summer Olympics.
