= Li Yihua =

Chinese diver

Personal information
- Nationality: Chinese
- Born: 27 April 1963 (age 63) Xiong County, China

Sport
- Sport: Diving
Medal record
Women's diving
Representing China
Summer Universiade
Gold medal – first place	1981 Bucharest	3 m springboard
Silver medal – second place	1985 Kobe	3 m springboard
Silver medal – second place	1981 Bucharest	10 m platform
Asian Games
Gold medal – first place	1982 New Delhi	3 m springboard

Li Yihua (Chinese: 李艺花; pinyin: Lǐ Yìhuā; born 27 April 1963) is a Chinese diver. She competed in the women's 3 metre springboard event at the 1984 Summer Olympics. She has been the Head Coach of the Pointe-Claire Diving Club (PCDC) since 1999 and is a Canadian National Team Coach. She has won many accolades, including being named Canadian senior Coach of the Year in 2000 by Diving Plongeon Canada, as well as Coach of the Year in 1994, 2000, 2006 and 2008. She also won the Petro-Canada Coaching Excellence Award seven times (2000, 2007, 2008, 2009, 2011, 2012, 2015) and was a finalist for the Jack Donohue Trophy in 2008 .. She has coached a multitude of Olympians and Olympic medalists, including, but not limited to, two-time Olympic medalist Anne Montminy, four-time Olympic medalist Émilie Heymans, Olympic medalists Meaghan Benfeito, Roseline Filion, and Nathan Zsombor-Murray, as well as Vincent Riendeau, Caeli Mckay, and many more.
