= Isabelle Arène =

French diver (born 1958)

Personal information
- Nationality: French
- Born: 5 May 1958 (age 66)

Sport
- Sport: Diving

Isabelle Arène (born 5 May 1958) is a French diver. She competed in the women's 3 metre springboard event at the 1980 Summer Olympics.
