= Diving at the 1977 Summer Universiade =

International diving championship event

- Venue: Borisova Gradina
- Dates: 25–28 August 1977
- Competitors: 22 from 8 nations

The diving events at the 1977 Summer Universiade were held from August 25 to 28, 1977, at the "Republika" Swimming Pool (currently Pluven kompleks "Mariya Luiza") inside the Liberty Park (currently Borisova Gradina Park) in Sofia, Bulgaria.

== Participant nations/NUSFs ==
8 National University Sporting Federations (NUSF)s participated in this event.

1. Bulgaria (4)
2. Canada (1)
3. Cuba (1)
4. Italy (2)
5. Japan (1)
6. Mexico (1)
7. Soviet Union (7)
8. United States (4)

== Medal overview ==
Event	Gold	Silver	Bronze
Men's 3-Meter Springboard	Rusten Bulatov (URS)	Rolando Ruiz (CUB)	Aleksandr Kosenkov (URS)
Men's 10-Meter Platform	Kent Vosler (USA)	Vyacheslav Troshin (URS)	Brian Bungum (USA)
Women's 3-Meter Springboard	Irina Kalinina (URS)	Tatyana Podmaryeva (URS)	Janet Nutter (CAN)
Women's Platform	Irina Kalinina (URS)	Elena Vaytsekhovskaya (URS)	Barbara Weinstein (USA)

== Medal table ==
* Host nation (Bulgaria)

Rank	Nation	Gold	Silver	Bronze	Total
1	Soviet Union (URS)	3	3	1	7
2	United States (USA)	1	0	2	3
3	Cuba (CUB)	0	1	0	1
4	Canada (CAN)	0	0	1	1
Totals (4 entries)		4	4	4	12
