= Sangwan Foengdee =

Thai diver

Personal information
- Nationality: Thai
- Born: 9 July 1951 (age 73)

Sport
- Sport: Diving

Sangwan Foengdee (born 9 July 1951) is a Thai diver. He competed in the men's 3 metre springboard event at the 1976 Summer Olympics.
