= Li Hongping =

Chinese diver

Hongping Li

Personal information
- Nationality: United States
- Born: February 14, 1963 (age 63) Shantou, Guangdong

Sport
- Sport: Diving
- Event: 10 m
Medal record
Men's diving
Representing China
Universiade
Gold medal – first place	1981 Bucharest	10 m platform
Silver medal – second place	1983 Edmonton	10m Platform
Bronze medal – third place	1979 Mexico City	10 m platform
Asian Games
Silver medal – second place	1978 Bangkok	10 m platform

Li Hongping (Chinese: 李宏平; born 14 February 1963) is a Chinese-American former diver who competed in the 1984 Summer Olympics. Hongping Li, an NCAA champion and two-time Olympian who has been one of the most successful NCAA coaches for more than a decade, is in his 14th year as USC's head diving coach. He was named to the position on July 1, 1999.

== Diving career ==
Originally from Beijing, Li was a 12-time national champion and a two-time Olympian while competing for China. He finished fourth on the 3-meter springboard at the 1984 Olympics in Los Angeles, earned gold medals on platform at the 1981 FINA World Cup in Mexico City and the 1981 World University Games and won bronze on 3-meter at the 1986 World Championships. He also qualified for the 1980 Olympics, but did not compete because of the Chinese boycott.

== Coaching career ==
Li, a two-time NCAA Coach of the Year (2002, 2006) and nine-time Pac-10 Women's (2001-02-03-05-06-09-10-11-12) and 2009 Pac-10 Men's Diving Coach of the Year and the winner of the 1998 and 1999 United States Olympic Committee's "Diving Developmental Coach of the Year" award, came to USC after serving as the head coach of the Mission Viejo (Calif.) Nadadores Diving Team since 1993.

Li led the Nadadores to the 1998 Junior National Championships team title as well as every Western National team title since 1996. He served as an assistant coach at Mission Viejo from 1989 to 1993, helping the club to consecutive junior team titles from 1991 to 1993.

At Mission Viejo, he produced eight Junior National champions who won a combined 20 individual titles. Among the elite divers Li coached was Erica Sorgi, who has captured five senior national titles since 1996.

Li, 49, was named the 1998 and 1999 U.S. Diving Outstanding Age Group Coach of the Year, was a U.S. team coach at the 1999 Pan Am Games, the 1998 World Diving Championships, the 1998 Goodwill Games and the 1997 World Junior Championships, and earned the Coach of Excellence award at the 1995 Senior National Championships.

Li has had sustained and broad success since joining the USC staff. He has directed eight men's and women's divers to a combined 34 All-American honors, six NCAA titles and 27 conference titles.

In 2001, Li guided Brennan to a pair of All-American honors (and her third consecutive Pac-10 1-meter title) and Fusaro to her first at the 2001 NCAAs. Both also reached the top three at the 2001 U.S. Indoor Championships. Brennan was named Pac-10 Diver of the Year, Fusaro was tabbed as Newcomer of the Year and Li earned his first Pac-10 Coach of the Year honor. A year earlier in 2000, Li helped guide Brennan to her first two All-American honors.

He earned NCAA Coach of the Year honors after directing the women's diving squad to superb results at the 2002 NCAA Championships. Hartley won a pair of NCAA titles and made three finals appearances on her way to 2002 NCAA Women's Diver of the Year while Fusaro also made three NCAA finals appearances. Senior diver Kellie Brennan also scored and just missed earning All-American honors. Also in 2002, Hartley won a silver and a bronze at the 2002 Commonwealth Games while Fusaro qualified for the 2002 U.S. national team.

In 2003, three of Li's divers earned All-American honors. Vincent became Li's first men's diver at USC to do so, taking third in the platform at the 2003 NCAA Championships. At the women's NCAAs, Hartley was a three-time All-American while Nicci Fusaro earned one All-American honor. Hartley also swept the 2003 Pac-10 Championship diving events on the women's side (Fusaro took a pair of seconds) and Vincent won the platform title in the men's meet. For their efforts, Li was named 2003 Pac-10 Women's Coach of the Year for the third consecutive season and Hartley was named Pac-10 Women's Diver of the Year for the second straight year.

Li also served as head coach for the U.S. Diving team that competed at the 2003 Grand Prix Diving Championships in Rome, Italy.

In 2004, Vincent earned All-American honors on the platform, continuing Li's streak of having Trojans earn All-American honors each year he's been at USC. Hilde won his first Pac-10 platform title weeks earlier. Additionally, Hartley represented Canada at the 2004 Olympics (winning bronze on platform synchro) while Li's club diver Rachelle Kunkel made the U.S. team placing 9th on 3-meter springboard. Li was also an assistant coach on the 2004 U.S. Olympic Diving team.

In 2005, Hartley won her third career NCAA title while Ray Vincent earned his third consecutive All-American honors on the platform. Hartley was named 2005 NCAA and Pac-10 women's diver of the year after winning the NCAA 3-meter title and her fifth and sixth career Pac-10 titles a few weeks earlier. She went on to win her second career World Championship gold medal on 1-meter in July, 2005, in Montreal. Vincent also won a Pac-10 title on platform and Troy's men's diving contingent was the highest scoring unit of the meet.

In 2006, Blythe Hartley won her fourth and fifth career NCAA titles with wins on the 1-meter and 3-meter springboard while Hilde made his All-American debut on 3-meter. Hartley, who also earned her 12th (a maximum for a diver) All-American honor with a final appearance on platform, was named NCAA Women's Diver of the Year for the second time. Her five career NCAA titles is tied for second among NCAA women divers. She also won her seventh and eighth career Pac-10 titles (a Pac-10 record). Junior Michael Hilde earned his first career All-American honor with an eighth-place on 3-meter at the NCAAs and he won his second career Pac-10 platform title (Troy's fourth in a row in the event). In addition to Hilde, Jenkins qualified for his first NCAA Championships, marking the third straight year USC has had two men at the NCAAs. It was the seventh year in a row USC featured at least one All-American diver under Li.

In 2007, Kenny Jenkins became the sixth USC diver to garner All-American honors under Li with a fifth place on platform at the 2007 NCAA Championships. Both Jenkins and fellow senior Michael Hilde scored individually at the NCAA Championships in both the 1-meter springboard and platform. Also, Popp reached the NCAAs for the second year in a row and scored for the first time with a 12th-place finish on platform.

In 2008, Starks, as a freshman, was an NCAA point scorer on platform and was a three-time Pac-10 finalist, including a second-place on platform. Freshman Christine Petrilli was third on both 1-meter and springboard at the Pac-10 Championships while senior Kim Popp was also a two-time Pac-10 finalist on the same boards. Also in 2008, Li worked for the USOC at the 2008 Olympics in Beijing as part of the administrative staff that bridged cultural and language gaps between U.S. and China coaches and athletes. While in Beijing, he was able to watch club divers Rittenhouse (springboard synchro) and Haley Ishimatsu (platform synchro) become Olympic finalists.

In 2009, Jones (1-meter and platform) and Ishimatsu (1-meter), then both freshmen, earned a combined three All-American honors, becoming the seventh and eighth All-American divers to compete for Li. Jones also was 10th on 3-meter while Ishimatsu was 12th on platform and Starks scored on platform. In the Pac-10, Jones won a title on platform and was second on both springboards while Starks was a three-time finalist. On the women's side, Ishimatsu won the 3-meter springboard and was second on 1-meter. In the summer of 2009, Li served as the head coach for the U.S. World Championships squad as well as at the international Canada Open Grand Prix. Also in 2009, club diver Haley Ishimatsu won a silver medal at the 2009 World Championships on 10m synchro.

In 2010, Victoria Ishimatsu earned a pair of All-American honors on 1-meter and 3-meter and was 10th on platform at the NCAA Championships. That followed Pac-10 titles on 1- and 3-meter, which helped her earn Pac-10 Diver of the Meet for the second year in a row. Freshman Ariel Rittenhouse finished 12th on 3-meter at the NCAAs and was second on 1-meter and third on 3-meter at the Pac-10s. On the men's side, Jones scored in two NCAA events and was a three-time Pac-10 finalist, including a title on 1-meter. Starks was a two-time Pac-10 finalist.

Also in 2010, Li served as head coach for the U.S. contingent at the first ever Youth Olympic Games in Singapore and was a FINA World Cup Diving Assistant Coach.

In 2011, Ishimatsu was tabbed as the Pac-10 Women's Diver of the Year for the third year in a row after claiming both Pac-12 springboard titles for the second year in a row. She competed in all three boards at the NCAAs, scoring on the 1-meter and platform. Junior Harrison Jones earned All-American honors on 3-meter and won the 1-meter title at Pac-12s. Senior Steven Starks was also a three-time Pac-12 finalist. Also in 2011, Li served as the World Championships USA Diving Team Manager. Li's then-club diver and current Trojan, Haley Ishimatsu (the younger sister of Victoria), won a 2011 U.S. national title on 10-meter.

In 2012 under Li, senior Victoria Ishimatsu won her first career NCAA title and became the first conference diver to win the Women's Diver of the Year four straight years (she was also the first to do it three straight). Ishimatsu won the NCAA title on 1-meter and was seventh on 3-meter, finishing with five career All-American honors. She was named Pac-12 Diver of the Meet for the third year in a row at the 2012 Pac-12 Championships after she won her fourth straight title on 3-meter (386.80) -- becoming the first Pac-12 woman to win four in a row on the same board—and her third consecutive crown on 1-meter (337.05). Freshman men's diver Jordan Gear was a finalist on platform at the Pac-12s last year, taking fourth.

== Personal life ==
Li attended USC from 1985 to 1989 and received a bachelor's degree in physical education in 1989. He won an NCAA title in the 3-meter springboard as a freshman in 1986 and earned All-American honors in the 1-meter springboard. He also earned Pac-10 titles in the 1- and 3-meter springboards that same year. He was not eligible to compete after 1986 because of an NCAA age rule.

Li lives in La Palma, Calif., with his wife Ling, their 22-year-old daughter, Amanda, a graduate of USC, and their toy poodle Coco.
