= Boris Kozlov (diver) =

Soviet diver (born 1950)

Personal information
- Nationality: Soviet
- Born: 18 November 1950 (age 74)

Sport
- Sport: Diving

Boris Kozlov (born 18 November 1950) is a Soviet diver. He competed in the men's 3 metre springboard event at the 1976 Summer Olympics.
