= Diving at the 1979 Pan American Games =

This page shows the results of the Diving Competition for men and women at the 1979 Pan American Games, held from July 1 to July 15, 1979 in San Juan, Puerto Rico. There were two events, for both men and women.

== Medal table ==
Place	Nation	Gold medal	Silver medal	Bronze medal	Total
1	United States	4	3	1	8
2	Mexico	0	1	1	2
3	Canada	0	0	2	2
Total		4	4	4	12

== Medalists ==
=== Men ===
Event	Gold	Silver	Bronze
3m springboard	Greg Louganis; United States	Phil Boggs; United States	Carlos Girón; Mexico
10m platform	Greg Louganis; United States	Carlos Girón; Mexico	Phil Boggs; United States

=== Women ===
Event	Gold	Silver	Bronze
3m springboard	Denise Christensen; United States	Janet Thorburn; United States	Janet Nutter; Canada
10m platform	Barbara Weinstein; United States	Janet Thorburn; United States	Linda Cuthbert; Canada

== See also ==
- Diving at the 1980 Summer Olympics
