= Chen Xiaoxia =

Chinese diver

Personal information
- Native name: 陳肖霞
- Nationality: China
- Born: October 8, 1962 (age 63) Dongguan, Guangdong
- Years active: 1976—1984

Sport
- Sport: Diving
- Event(s): springboard, platform
- Retired: 1984
Medal record
Women's diving
Representing China
FINA Diving World Cup
Gold medal – first place	1981 Mexico City	10 m platform
Gold medal – first place	1983 The Woodlands	10 m platform
Asian Games
Gold medal – first place	1978 Bangkok	10 m platform
Universiade
Gold medal – first place	1981 Bucharest	10 m platform
Gold medal – first place	1979 Mexico City	10 m platform
Silver medal – second place	1979 Mexico City	3 m springboard

Chen Xiaoxia (Chinese: 陈肖霞; born October 8, 1962) is a former Chinese diver and the first Chinese world champion in diving. She was dubbed "Diving Queen" by the US Swimming World Magazine.

== Early life ==
Chen was born in Dongguan, Guangdong Province.

== Career ==
Chen started diving training in 1973, and was recruited to Guangdong provincial team the next year. In 1976, she won 2nd place in national competition, and was admitted to Chinese national team the following year. In 1978, Chen competed at Asian Games and won gold medal in women's platform diving.

Chen claimed gold medal at the 1979 Summer Universiade, thus becoming the first Chinese world champion in diving. She also claimed gold medal at the 1981 and 1983 FINA Diving World Cup. In 1981, she was selected as best diver by the US Swimming World Magazine.

Due to China's boycott to the 1980 Moscow Olympics, Chen didn't win Olympic champion at the climax of her career. Four years later, Chen competed at the 1984 Los Angeles Olympics and claimed 4th place. She retired after that.

In May 1986, Chen moved to the US.
