= Ewa Kucińska =

Polish diver

Personal information
- Nationality: Polish
- Born: 2 April 1962 (age 62); Gorzów Wielkopolski, Poland

Sport
- Sport: Diving

Ewa Kucińska (born 2 April 1962) is a Polish diver. She competed in the women's 10 metre platform event at the 1980 Summer Olympics, placing 13th in the diving event.
