= Radoslav Radev =

Bulgarian diver

Personal information
- Nationality: Bulgarian
- Born: 27 February 1960 (age 65)

Sport
- Sport: Diving

Radoslav Radev (born 27 February 1960) is a Bulgarian diver. He competed in the men's 10 metre platform event at the 1980 Summer Olympics for Bulgaria.
