= Ahmet Kizil =

Turkish diver

Personal information
- Nationality: Turkish
- Born: 1 May 1954 (age 70); Adana, Turkey

Sport
- Sport: Diving

Ahmet Kizil (born 1 May 1954) is a Turkish diver. He competed in the men's 3 metre springboard event at the 1976 Summer Olympics.
