= Thomas Knuths =

German diver

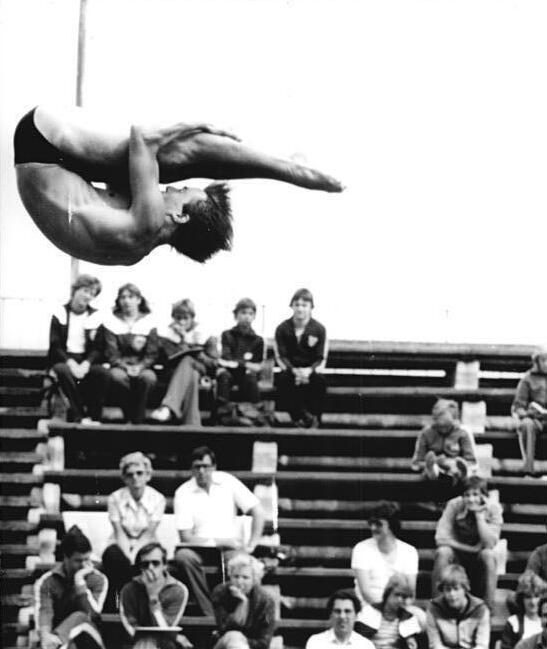
- Thomas Knuths diving in the air in 1982

Personal information
- Born: 31 August 1958 (age 67) Schwäbisch Gmünd

Sport
- Sport: Diving
Medal record
Representing East Germany
European Championships
Gold medal – first place	1985 Sofia	10m platform

Thomas Knuths (born 31 August 1958) is a German former diver who competed in the 1980 Summer Olympics in the 10 metre platform event.
