= Claus Thomsen (diver) =

Danish diver

Personal information
- Nationality: Danish
- Born: 22 January 1959 (age 66); Frederiksberg, Denmark

Sport
- Sport: Diving

Claus Thomsen (born 22 January 1959) is a Danish diver. He competed in the men's 10 metre platform event at the 1980 Summer Olympics.
