= Irina Sidorova =

Soviet diver

Personal information
- Nationality: Soviet
- Born: 25 September 1962 (age 63) Minsk, Belarus

Sport
- Sport: Diving
Medal record
Women's diving
Representing the Soviet Union
European Championships
Silver medal – second place	1985 Sofia	3 m springboard

Irina Sidorova (born 25 September 1962) is a Soviet diver. She competed in the women's 3 metre springboard event at the 1980 Summer Olympics.
