= Denise Christensen =

American diver

Personal information
- Born: Tucson, Arizona, United States

Sport
- Sport: Diving
Medal record
Representing the United States
Pan American Games
Gold medal – first place	1979 San Juan	Springboard

Denise Christensen is a diver from Tucson, Arizona, United States. She won a gold medal in springboard diving at the 1979 Pan American Games in San Juan.

In 1980 she became AIAW diving champion in springboard, and in 1982 she won the AIAW team championship with the Texas Longhorns.
