= César Jiménez (diver) =

Dominican Republic diver

Personal information
- Nationality: Dominican
- Born: 13 September 1959 (age 65)

Sport
- Sport: Diving

César Jiménez (born 13 September 1959) is a Dominican Republic diver. He competed in the men's 10 metre platform event at the 1980 Summer Olympics.
