= Rolando Ruiz =

Cuban diver (born 1957)

Personal information
- Born: 26 March 1957 (age 69) Havana, Cuba

Sport
- Sport: Diving
Medal record
Men's diving
Representing Cuba
Universiade
Silver medal – second place	1977 Sofia	3 m springboard
Silver medal – second place	1979 Mexico City	3 m springboard

Rolando Ruiz (born 26 March 1957) is a Cuban diver. He competed in the men's 3 metre springboard event at the 1980 Summer Olympics.
