= Diving at the 1979 Summer Universiade =

The diving competitions in the 1979 Summer Universiade were held in Mexico City, Mexico.

== Medal overview ==
Event	Gold	Silver	Bronze
Men's 3-meter springboard	Aleksandr Kosenkov (URS)	Rolando Ruiz (CUB)	Li Kongzheng (CHN)
Men's platform	Vladimir Aleynik (URS)	David Ambartsumyan (URS)	Li Hongping (CHN)
Women's 3-meter springboard	Irina Kalinina (URS)	Chen Xiaoxia (CHN)	Chen Shi (CHN)
Women's platform	Chen Xiaoxia (CHN)	Irina Kalinina (URS)	Chen Shi (CHN)

== Medal table ==
Rank	Nation	Gold	Silver	Bronze	Total
1	Soviet Union (URS)	3	2	0	5
2	China (CHN)	1	1	4	6
3	Cuba (CUB)	0	1	0	1
Totals (3 entries)		4	4	4	12
