= Sulaiman Qabazard =

Kuwaiti diver

- Born: August 14, 1958; Kuwait
- Occupation(s): Diver, diving coach, and entrepreneur
- Years active: 1975–present

Sulaiman Qabazard (born August 14, 1958) is a Kuwaiti diver, diving coach, and entrepreneur who participated in various international tournaments in the 1970s and coached the national diving team for several decades.

== Early life ==
Qabazard was born in Sharq, Kuwait in August 14, 1958 to a Kuwaiti family of Iranian descent. In the 1980s, he completed an undergraduate degree in mechanical engineering in the United States. After graduating from college, he continued living in America for a few years working as a gym coach and equipment cleaner. He later returned to Kuwait and worked at a government ministry.

== Career ==
At the 1976 Summer Olympics in Montreal, he competed in the men's 3 metre springboard event, placing 27th. He was only 17 years old at the time. In 1978 at the age of 20, he participated in 1978 World Aquatics Championships in Berlin and was ranked 29. In 2000, he was the first judge at the 3rd FINA Diving World Series in Bangkok.

Throughout the 1990s and 2000s up until the 2010s, Qabazard coached the national diving team and he was largely credited for Kuwait's success as the leading Gulf country in the sport of diving. He coached several athletes who went on to compete at the Summer Olympics including Ali Al-Hasan.

Qabazard initially started his entrepreneurial career in the 1990s opening a health club and spa in Sharjah, United Arab Emirates. He then opened multiple businesses in Kuwait. In the early 2000s, he founded the Challenge Health Club chain in Kuwait.
