= Joe Snively =

American ice hockey player

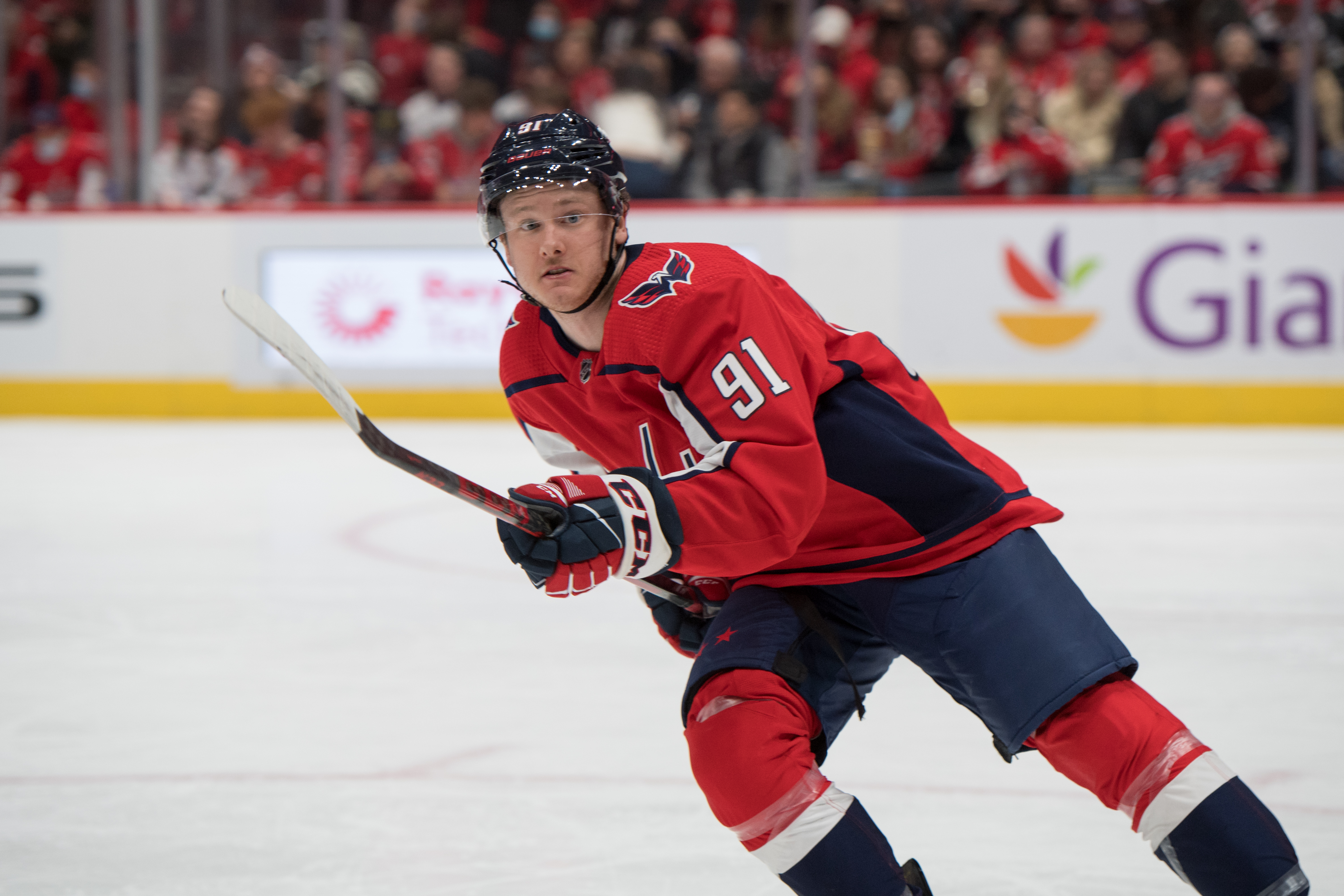
- Snively with the Washington Capitals in 2021
- Born: January 1, 1996 (age 30) Herndon, Virginia, U.S.
- Height: 5 ft 9 in (175 cm)
- Weight: 176 lb (80 kg; 12 st 8 lb)
- Position: Center
- Shoots: Left
- SHL team Former teams: Djurgårdens IF; Washington Capitals
- NHL draft: Undrafted
- Playing career: 2019–present

Joseph Snively (born January 1, 1996) is an American professional ice hockey player who is a center for Djurgårdens IF of the Swedish Hockey League (SHL). He played college ice hockey at Yale University.

== Playing career ==
On March 18, 2019, Snively signed a two-year, entry-level contract with the Washington Capitals. He was re-signed by the Capitals to a one-year, two-way contract for $750,000 on June 3, 2021. After playing parts of four seasons with the Hershey Bears, Snively was recalled to the Capitals on December 19, 2021, and made his NHL debut that night against the Los Angeles Kings. On February 10, 2022, Snively scored two goals and an assist in a 5–2 victory over the Montreal Canadiens, earning his first two NHL goals.

Snively won back-to-back Calder Cup championships with the Hershey Bears in 2023 and 2024. During the 2022–23 season he recorded nine goals and 18 assists in 32 regular season games and two goals and 13 assists in 20 playoff games. He spent the majority of the 2023–24 season with Bears and recorded 14 goals and 45 assists in 69 regular season games. During the playoffs he recorded four goals and 14 assists in 20 games. He also appeared in three games with the Capitals.

On July 2, 2024, Snively signed a one-year, two way contract with the Detroit Red Wings. At the beginning of the 2024–25 season, Snively was re-assigned and spent the entirety of his contract with the Red Wings AHL affiliate, the Grand Rapids Griffins, posting 47 points through 72 regular season games.

As a free agent from the Red Wings, Snively opted to pursue a career abroad, agreeing to a one-year contract with Swedish club, Djurgårdens IF of the SHL, on July 9, 2025.

== Personal life ==
Growing up in Herndon, Virginia, Snively rooted for the Washington Capitals and was part of the team's Washington Little Caps program. His uncle is Canadian diver David Snively, who was a member of the Canadian Olympic team that boycotted the 1980 Summer Olympics.

== Career statistics ==
			Regular season					Playoffs
Season	Team	League	GP	G	A	Pts	PIM	GP	G	A	Pts	PIM
2012–13	Sioux City Musketeers	USHL	48	9	7	16	10	—	—	—	—	—
2013–14	Sioux City Musketeers	USHL	56	14	31	45	45	8	0	4	4	4
2014–15	Sioux City Musketeers	USHL	55	27	37	64	26	5	1	3	4	8
2015–16	Yale University	ECAC	32	10	18	28	12	—	—	—	—	—
2016–17	Yale University	ECAC	33	14	25	39	34	—	—	—	—	—
2017–18	Yale University	ECAC	31	19	17	36	18	—	—	—	—	—
2018–19	Yale University	ECAC	33	15	21	36	17	—	—	—	—	—
2018–19	Hershey Bears	AHL	9	2	5	7	0	2	0	0	0	0
2019–20	Hershey Bears	AHL	45	12	12	24	14	—	—	—	—	—
2020–21	Hershey Bears	AHL	30	6	11	17	8	—	—	—	—	—
2021–22	Hershey Bears	AHL	35	15	23	38	18	1	0	0	0	0
2021–22	Washington Capitals	NHL	12	4	3	7	2	—	—	—	—	—
2022–23	Washington Capitals	NHL	12	2	2	4	0	—	—	—	—	—
2022–23	Hershey Bears	AHL	32	9	18	27	6	20	2	13	15	6
2023–24	Hershey Bears	AHL	69	14	45	59	26	20	4	14	18	26
2023–24	Washington Capitals	NHL	3	0	0	0	0	—	—	—	—	—
2024–25	Grand Rapids Griffins	AHL	72	21	26	47	26	3	0	1	1	0
2025–26	Djurgårdens IF	SHL	52	15	24	39	18	3	0	0	0	0
NHL totals			27	6	5	11	2	—	—	—	—	—

=== International ===
Year	Team	Event	Result	GP	G	A	Pts	PIM
2013	United States	IH18	2nd place, silver medalist(s)	5	1	1	2	4
2014	United States	WJAC	1st place, gold medalist(s)	4	2	1	3	6
Junior totals				9	3	2	5	10

== Awards and honors ==
Award	Year	Ref
College
ECAC Rookie of the Year	2016	
ECAC All-Rookie Team	2016	
ECAC First All-Star Team	2019	
ECAC Second All-Star Team	2018	
AHL
Calder Cup champion	2023, 2024	
