= Alex Bagiu =

Romanian diver

Personal information
- Nationality: Romanian

Sport
- Sport: Diving

Alex Bagiu is a Romanian diver. He competed in two events at the 1980 Summer Olympics.
