= Ruxandra Hociotă =

Romanian diver

Personal information
- Nationality: Romanian
- Born: 15 July 1959 (age 66)

Sport
- Sport: Diving
Medal record
Women's diving
Representing Romania
Summer Universiade
Bronze medal – third place	1981 Bucharest	3 m springboard

Ruxandra Hociotă (born 15 July 1959) is a Romanian diver. She competed in the women's 3 metre springboard event at the 1980 Summer Olympics.
