= Barbara Weinstein (diver) =

American diver

Personal information
- Born: Cincinnati, United States

Sport
- Sport: Diving
Medal record
Representing the United States
Pan American Games
Gold medal – first place	1979 San Juan	Platform
Universiade
Bronze medal – third place	1977 Sofia	Platform

Barbara Weinstein is an American diver from Cincinnati, United States.

At the 1973 Maccabiah Games in Israel, she won a gold medal in three metre diving.

She won a gold medal in platform diving at the 1979 Pan American Games and a bronze medal at the 1977 Summer Universiade.

She qualified for the 1980 U.S. Olympic team but did not compete due to the U.S. Olympic Committee's boycott of the 1980 Summer Olympics in Moscow, Russia. She was one of 461 athletes to receive a Congressional Gold Medal instead.
