= Jan Chmelar =

Swedish ice hockey player

- Born: 5 May 1981 (age 45) Huddinge, Sweden
- Height: 179 cm (5 ft 10 in)
- Weight: 79 kg (174 lb; 12 st 6 lb)
- Position: Goaltender
- Caught: Left
- Played for: Djurgården
- Playing career: 1998–2003

Jan Chmelar (Czech: Jan Chmelař; born 5 May 1981) is a Swedish retired ice hockey goaltender of Czech origin. Chmelar was part of the Djurgården Swedish champions' team of 2000.
