= Ken Armstrong (diver) =

Canadian diver

Personal information
- Born: 12 October 1953 (age 72) Ingersoll, Ontario, Canada

Sport
- Sport: Diving
Medal record
Men's diving
Representing Canada
Commonwealth Games
Silver medal – second place	1978 Edmonton	10 m highboard

Ken Armstrong (born 12 October 1953) is a Canadian diver. He competed in two events at the 1976 Summer Olympics.
