= Karin Guthke =

German diver

Personal information
- Nationality: German
- Born: 23 November 1956 (age 69) Berlin, Germany

Sport
- Country: East Germany
- Sport: Diving
Medal record
Summer Olympics
Bronze medal – third place	1980 Moscow	3 metre springboard

Karin Guthke (born 23 November 1956) is a German diver. She won a bronze medal at the 1980 Summer Olympics in the 3 metre springboard event. She also participated in the 1976 Summer Olympics.
