= Liliana Cîrstea =

Romanian diver

Personal information
- Nationality: Romanian
- Born: 7 August 1962 (age 62)

Sport
- Sport: Diving

Liliana Cîrstea (born 7 August 1962) is a Romanian diver. She competed in the women's 3 metre springboard event at the 1980 Summer Olympics.
