= Annie Liljeberg =

Swedish diver

Personal information
- Nationality: Swedish
- Born: 22 August 1957 (age 67); Stockholm, Sweden

Sport
- Sport: Diving

Annie Liljeberg (born 22 August 1957) is a Swedish diver. She competed in the women's 3 metre springboard event at the 1980 Summer Olympics.
