= Yelena Matyushenko =

Soviet diver

Personal information
- Nationality: Soviet
- Born: 25 January 1961 (age 65)

Sport
- Sport: Diving
- Event(s): 3 m, 10 m
Medal record
Women's diving
Representing Soviet Union
Universiade
Bronze medal – third place	1981 Bucharest	10 m platform

Yelena Matyushenko (born 25 January 1961) is a Soviet diver. She competed in the women's 10 metre platform event at the 1980 Summer Olympics.
