= Ricardo Camacho =

Spanish diver

Personal information
- Nationality: Spanish
- Born: 25 December 1955 (age 70)

Sport
- Sport: Diving

Ricardo Camacho (born 25 December 1955) is a Spanish diver. He competed at the 1976 Summer Olympics, the 1980 Summer Olympics and the 1984 Summer Olympics.
