= Sirvard Emirzyan =

Soviet diver

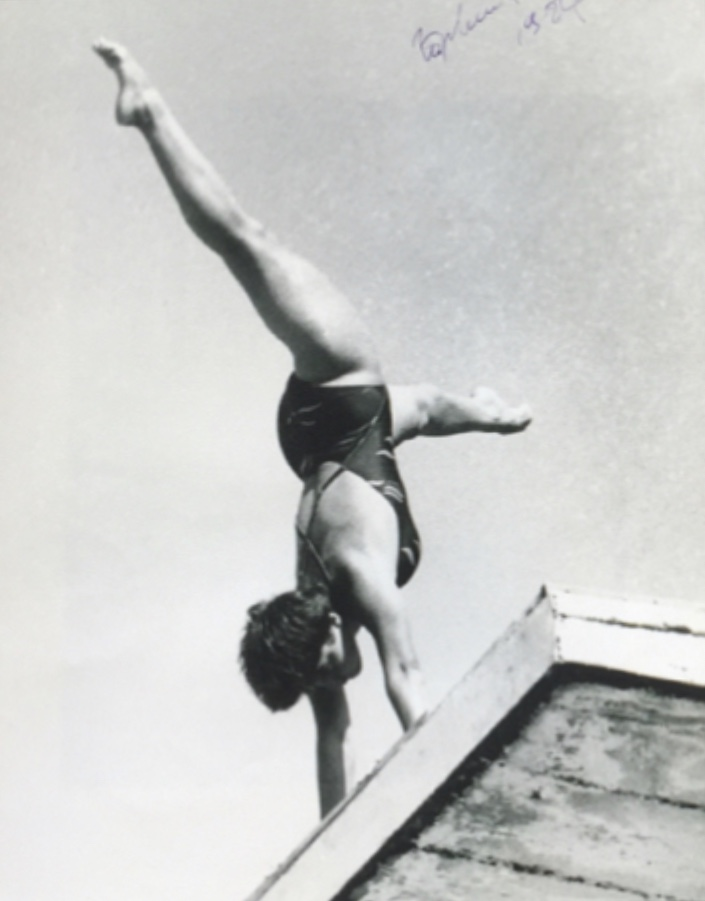
- Sirvard Emirzyan diving from a 10m platform

Personal information
- Born: 5 June 1966 (age 60) Yerevan, Armenian SSR

Sport
- Sport: Diving
Medal record
Representing Soviet Union
Olympic Games
Silver medal – second place	1980 Moscow	10 m platform

Sirvard Emirzyan (Armenian: Սիրվարդ Էմիրզյան, born 5 June 1966) is a former Soviet diver of Armenian descent. She was awarded the Honoured Master of Sports of the USSR title in 1980.

Sirvard started to practice diving in 1972 under the teaching of Basil Kuvshinkin. She became a Champion of the USSR in 1979 in the pole ten-meter platform, and in 1980, finished Second in the same discipline. Emirzyan, a schoolgirl at the time, competed at the 1980 Summer Olympics in Moscow as the youngest athlete on the USSR Olympic team. At the age of 14, she won an Olympic silver medal on the 10 meter platform.
