= Dana Chmelařová =

Czech diver

Personal information
- Nationality: Czech
- Born: 25 August 1960 (age 65)

Sport
- Sport: Diving

Dana Chmelařová (born 25 August 1960) is a Czech diver. She competed in the women's 10 metre platform event at the 1980 Summer Olympics.
