= Martina Jäschke =

German diver

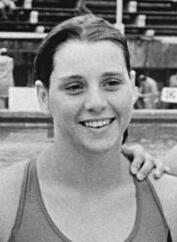
- Martina Jäschke in 1981

Personal information
- Born: 6 May 1960 (age 66) Merseburg, East Germany

Sport
- Sport: Diving
Medal record
Representing East Germany
Olympic Games
| Gold medal – first place | 1980 Moscow | 10 m platform |
World Championships
| Silver medal – second place | 1978 West Berlin | 10 m platform |
European Championships
| Silver medal – second place | 1981 Split | 3 m springboard |
| Bronze medal – third place | 1981 Split | 10 m platform |

Martina Jäschke (later Scheidewig then Fülle; born 6 May 1960) is a German diver and Olympic champion. She competed at the 1980 Olympic Games in Moscow, where she received a gold medal in the 10 metre platform event.
