= Mark Graham (diver) =

New Zealand diver

Personal information
- Full name: Robert James Mark Graham
- Born: 19 May 1961 (age 65) Auckland, New Zealand
- Height: 167 cm (5 ft 6 in)
- Weight: 60 kg (132 lb)

Sport
- Sport: Diving
Medal record
Men's diving
Representing New Zealand
Commonwealth Games
Bronze medal – third place	1982 Brisbane	3 m springboard

Robert James Mark Graham (born 19 May 1961) was a New Zealand diver who won a bronze medal for New Zealand in the Men’s 3m Springboard event at the 1982 Commonwealth Games. He also competed in the 1986 Commonwealth Games in Edinburgh, and was 13th after hitting the diving board with his hand during the event.

He competed at the 1984 Summer Olympics. He was 18th in the preliminaries for the springboard event (with 497.55 points) so did not qualify for the finals. He competed with a dislocating shoulder and recovering from a broken rib after being assaulted during his preparations for the Olympics.

Mark attended Boston University on athletic scholarship where he studied Broadcast Journalism and Philosophy but failed to graduate. On his return to Auckland, he completed a BA in Philosophy and Political Studies, including papers in Green Economics. He completed a Diploma of Business; Marketing while at TVNZ in 1994.

He has worked in advertising agencies and media companies for the past 25 years including TVNZ, ACP Media, Young & Rubicam advertising & McCann Erickson advertising

While at TVNZ, he became involved with interactive television projects as Manager – Direct Response and Interactive TV, and including one for Bluebird Potato Chips. At TVNZ he produced several of the first fully interactive TVCs in the world, he was initiator and project manager of the first website in New Zealand (and possibly the world), with realtime insurance quotes for Sun Direct Insurance and was a critical part of the team that pitched and won the direct response work from Telecom’s XTRA during its launch.

He was Account Director in the team that won the Direct Marketing Association’s (DMA) Grand Prix prize for the Sun Direct campaign and was instrumental in Sun Direct winning the Retail Marketing Award at the TVNZ/Marketing Magazine Awards in 1996, and three bronze medals at the following year’s DMA Direct Marketing Awards.

Mark’s uncle is Sir Doug Graham, Minister of Justice and Minister of Treaty Negotiations in the National Government in the early 1990s and another uncle, Dr Kennedy Graham, a former Green Party Member of Parliament and ex-Secretary General of Parliamentarians for Global Action and a number of UN-attached NGOs.

Following a move to publishing in the late 90s, Mark worked at Dow Communications publishing the Conventions NZ Conference Planner and overhauled the organisation's website, then left to run Straight Up Productions/Aim High Publishing, publishing consumer guides to building (Building Guide) and architectural design (Design Guide) and a trade publication, BoB - the Business of Building.

In 2016 he had major complications following a shoulder repair operation, resulting in chronic brachial neuritis and phrenic nerve palsy.

He ran as a candidate for Auckland Council Governing Body on the City Vision ticket in 2019 but was hit by a driver while taking his daughter to her gym class on his Vespa, suffering a concussion, whiplash and broken ribs.
