= Martina Proeber =

German diver

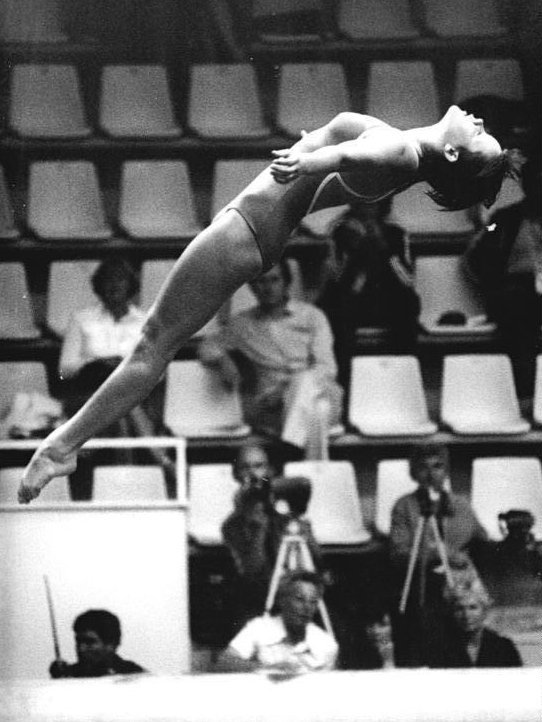
- Proeber diving in 1982

Personal information
- Nationality: German
- Born: January 4, 1963 (age 63) Rostock, East Germany

Sport
- Country: East Germany
- Sport: Diving
Medal record
Summer Olympics
| Silver medal – second place | 1980 Moscow | 3 metre springboard |

Martina Proeber (born 4 January 1963) is a German diver. She won a silver medal at the 1980 Summer Olympics in the 3 metre springboard event.
