= Carlos Girón =

Mexican diver (1954–2020)

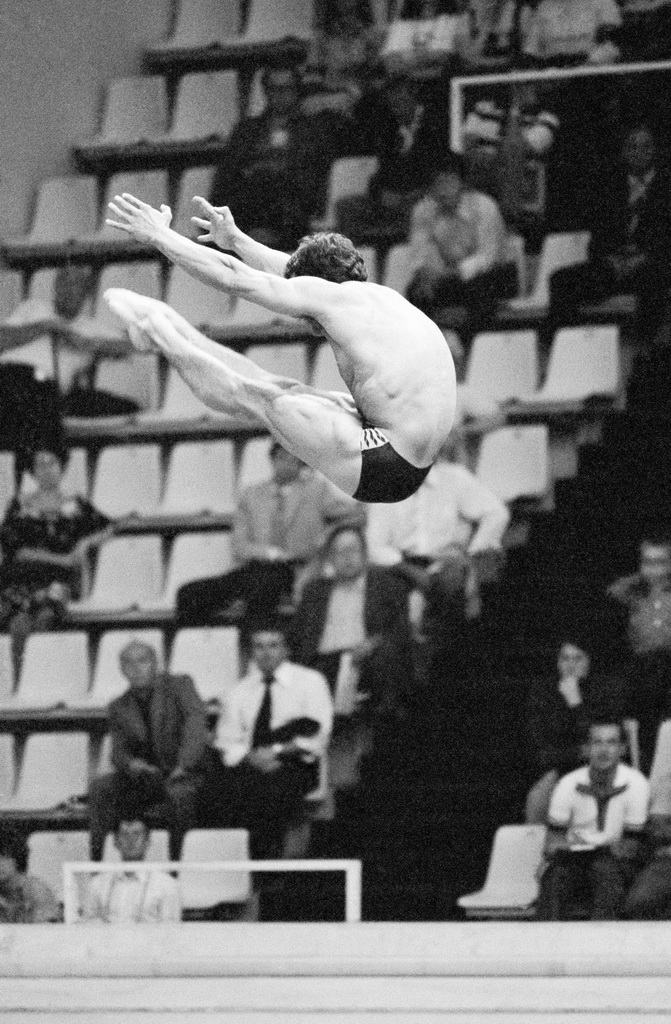
- Carlos Girón at Olympic Games 1980

Personal information
- Born: 3 November 1954 Mexicali, Baja California, Mexico
- Died: 13 January 2020 (aged 65) Mexico City, Mexico, Mexico
Medal record
Men's diving
Representing Mexico
Olympic Games
Silver medal – second place	1980 Moscow	3m Springboard
Pan American Games
Gold medal – first place	1975 Mexico City	10m Platform
Silver medal – second place	1979 San Juan	10m Platform
Bronze medal – third place	1975 Mexico City	3m Springboard
Bronze medal – third place	1979 San Juan	3m Springboard

Carlos Armando Girón Gutiérrez (3 November 1954 — 13 January 2020) was a Mexican diver. He competed in four consecutive Summer Olympics, winning one medal.

At the 1972 Summer Olympics in Munich, Germany, he finished ninth in the 3 metre springboard event and eighth in the 10 metre platform event. In 1976 he repeated the position in the platform diving while advancing to a seventh place in the springboard.

At the 1980 Summer Olympics in Moscow, USSR he finally won a silver medal in 3 metre springboard, and came close to another medal with a fourth place in the 10 metre platform. His final Olympic performance came in 1984 where he placed twelfth.

On 13 January 2020, Girón died from pneumonia at age 65.

== See also ==
- List of members of the International Swimming Hall of Fame
- A Step Away
