= Salvador Sobrino =

Mexican diver

Personal information
- Nationality: Mexican
- Born: 16 June 1959 (age 67)

Sport
- Sport: Diving
- Now coaching: Jesus Mena; Fernando Platas; Melissa Wu

Salvador Chava Sobrino (born 16 June 1959) is a Mexican diver. He competed in the men's 10 metre platform event at the 1980 Summer Olympics.
