= Dieter Dörr =

German diver

Personal information
- Born: 6 August 1957 (age 68) Burgsinn, West Germany

Sport
- Sport: Diving
Medal record
Representing West Germany
European Championships
Bronze medal – third place	1985 Sofia	3m springboard

Dieter Dörr (born 6 August 1957) is a German former diver who competed in the 1976 Summer Olympics and in the 1984 Summer Olympics.
