= Liana Tsotadze =

Georgian diver

Personal information
- Born: 7 June 1961 (age 65)

Sport
- Sport: Diving
Medal record
Representing the Soviet Union
Olympic Games
Bronze medal – third place	1980 Moskva	10 m platform

Liana Tsotadze (born 7 June 1961) is a Georgian former diver who competed in the 1980 Summer Olympics.
