= Diving at the 1980 Summer Olympics =

Diving at the Games of the XXII Olympiad
- Venue: Swimming Pool at the Olimpiysky Sports Complex
- Dates: 20 July 1980 through 28 July 1980
- No. of events: 4
- Competitors: 67 from 21 nations

At the 1980 Summer Olympics in Moscow, four diving events were contested during a competition that took place at the Olimpiysky Sports Complex Swimming Pool, from 20 to 28 July (24 July, rest day), comprising 67 divers from 21 nations.

== Medal summary ==
The events are named according to the International Olympic Committee labelling, but they appeared on the official report as "springboard diving" and "platform diving", respectively.

=== Men ===
Event	Gold	Silver	Bronze
3 m springboard	Aleksandr Portnov; Soviet Union	Carlos Girón; Mexico	Giorgio Cagnotto; Italy
10 m platform	Falk Hoffmann; East Germany	Vladimir Aleynik; Soviet Union	David Ambartsumyan; Soviet Union

=== Women ===
Event	Gold	Silver	Bronze
3 m springboard	Irina Kalinina; Soviet Union	Martina Proeber; East Germany	Karin Guthke; East Germany
10 m platform	Martina Jäschke; East Germany	Sirvard Emirzyan; Soviet Union	Liana Tsotadze; Soviet Union

== Medal table ==
Rank	Nation	Gold	Silver	Bronze	Total
1	Soviet Union	2	2	2	6
2	East Germany	2	1	1	4
3	Mexico	0	1	0	1
4	Italy	0	0	1	1
Totals (4 entries)		4	4	4	12

== Participating nations ==
Here are listed the nations that were represented in the diving events and, in brackets, the number of national competitors.

- Australia (4)
- Austria (2)
- Brazil (1)
- Bulgaria (2)
- Cuba (2)
- Czechoslovakia (2)
- Denmark (1)
- Dominican Republic (2)
- East Germany (9)
- France (1)
- Great Britain (6)
- Hungary (2)
- Italy (1)
- Kuwait (1)
- Mexico (6)
- Poland (2)
- Romania (3)
- Soviet Union (12)
- Spain (3)
- Sweden (2)
- Zimbabwe (3)

== See also ==
- Diving at the 1979 Pan American Games
