= David Snively =

Canadian diver

Personal information
- Nationality: Canadian
- Born: July 1960 (age 65)
- Website: https://davidsnively.com/

Sport
- Sport: Diving
- Coached by: Don Webb

David Snively (born July 1960) is a Canadian former diver, who was selected to represent the Canadian national diving team at the 1980 Summer Olympics in Moscow before Canada announced a boycott of the event in protest of the Soviet invasion of Afghanistan, instead having to settle to a trip to either Asia or Europe. At this time, he was considered among the best divers in Canada and during a tour of Europe, won a gold and silver medal in Madrid, as well as a bronze in Split, Yugoslavia. In 1981, he was the men's overall champion of the Canadian National Winter Diving Championships.

He spent the next several years preparing for the 1984 Summer Olympics, only to fall short on each of the high tower and springboard trial events, finishing 3rd in each with only two berths available in each event on the national team. A severe back injury, and shoulder injury suffered in the summer of 1983 kept Snively out of the water training for 7 months, leading to his poor finish at the Olympic trials in 1984. Following his failure to secure a place in the 1984 Olympics, Snively retired from competitive diving. He realized his dream of becoming a world champion in 2017, when he won gold medals in the men's 1-metre, 3-metre and platform events during the FINA World Masters Championships in Budapest. As of 2022, he runs a fitness studio in Montreal.

== Career ==
=== Early years ===
Snively took up diving at the relatively late age of 14. In 1974, he was spending all of his spare time on swimming and diving practice lessons, which also necessitated a lot of cash from his parents to fund his training. His parents made him decide between the two sports, to which he chose diving as he considered himself to be progressing at a much faster rate. Snively won several Canadian diving championships for his age, and in 1977 he competed in his second senior nationals, finishing third in each of the 10-metre and 3-metre events, qualifying him for the Canadian National Diving Team. He attributed his success to coach Don Webb, who was the first full time diving coach hired in Canada in 1974. Webb considered Snively to be inconsistent, to which Snively accepted and noted, "I have to work at it, but that'll come with experience". Snively had ambitions to win a gold medal at the 1978 Commonwealth Games, although conceded that he didn't want diving to "become his life" and vowed to quit if he ever began to hate it. Prior to the Commonwealth Games, he would spend four to five hours a day on average training, which didn't include his other sports training in weight lifting and trampolining.

=== Competitive diving ===
During the 1980 Olympic trials, he finished third and qualified for the final berth on the national team, but missed his opportunity when Canada boycotted the event in protest of the Soviet invasion of Afghanistan. At that time, Snively faced the difficult choice of either waiting another four years to compete or end his diving career. Prior to the 1980 Olympics, he was considered as one of Canada's "most outstanding divers". Despite not being able to compete in the Olympics, Snively and fellow diver Debbie Fuller put on admirable displays in Split, Yugoslavia, with Snively achieving 3rd place on the 3-metre springboard and tower events, as part of a tour of three countries designed to lessen the blow of not competing in Moscow. The same week when competing in Madrid, Spain, Snively won a gold and silver medal. During the Canadian National Winter Championships which took place during March 1981 at Pointe Claire, he won as the men's overall champion and received a $1,000 scholarship from Adidas-Arena. The final event of the competition, the men's 3-metre, was also won by Snivley, beating his teammate Mitch Geller.

During the years leading up to the 1984 Summer Olympics, he ranked as one of the best two divers in Canada. During that time, the competition was intensifying and Snively ultimately fell behind two competitors who were ultimately chosen to participate in the Olympics, David Bedard and Mark Rourke respectively. In the tower event trials, Snively came short of Rourke by just 3.36 points. He also fell short on the springboard trial events, again finishing third which ultimately concluded his career as a competitive diver.

== Later life ==
Following his diving career, Snively became a fitness expert and personal trainer and started his own business named DBS Fitness Concepts after having spent a number of years as a group exercise class trainer. Snively also hosted two popular TV work shows, Great Shape (1989-1984) on CFCF TV in Montreal, and later the Caribbean Workout (1994-2003) on TSN, OLN and OUT TV. During a power yoga class with a premier instructor, he dislocated his shoulder when his instructor tried to manipulate his body into a "challenging pose".

Following disappointments in his earlier diving career, Snively realized his dream of winning a world title in August 2017, when at the age of 57 he won three world titles, winning gold medals in the men's 1-metre, 3-metre and platform events during the FINA World Masters Championships in Budapest. He had previously intended upon participating in the World Masters Championships in 2014, only to sustain a knee injury and later needed an emergency appendectomy in January 2017. He prepared by training at the pool up to four times a week, although limited his time there to just a half-hour warmup and no more than an hour practicing on a diving board. Snively also won 7 medals: 2 gold, three silver, and two bronze at the 2019 World Masters Championships in Gwangju, South Korea in 2019.

== Personal life ==
Born in July 1960, Snively attended John Rennie High School in Pointe Claire, Quebec, and was described by a classmate as a quiet, average student. Snively graduated from SMU in Dallas, Texas in 1982, winning the Scholastic Achievement Award (highest GPA of any athlete at SMU) and the Outstanding Management of Science and Computers award, his graduating major. Snively came to SMU in 1978 on an athletic scholarship, but within one year switched to an academic scholarship thanks to his high GPA. His nephew is NHL ice hockey player Joe Snively.

Snively is married, and lives in Montreal with his husband and three children.
