= David Hambartsumyan =

Armenian diver

Personal information
- Born: 24 June 1956 Kapan, Armenian SSR, Soviet Union
- Died: 11 January 1992 (aged 35) Yerevan, Armenia
Medal record
Men's diving
Representing the Soviet Union
Olympic Games
Bronze medal – third place	1980 Moscow	10 m platform
European Championships
Gold medal – first place	1981 Split	10 m platform
Gold medal – first place	1983 Rome	10 m platform
Silver medal – second place	1977 Jönköping	10 m platform
Universiade
Silver medal – second place	1979 Mexico City	10 m platform

David Grigoryevich Hambardzumyan (Armenian: Դավիթ Գրիգորևիչ Համբարձումյան, 24 June 1956 in Kapan – 11 January 1992 in Yerevan) was an Armenian diver, who twice became European champion. He was a bronze medalist at the 1980 Summer Olympics, and 16 times champion of the USSR. Hambardzumyan died on 11 January 1992 of cardiac arrest.

== Sources ==
- Olympic Obituaries - 1992. Citius, Altius, Fortius. Vol. 1 No. 2, Spring 1992.
- David Hambardzumyan Olympic medals and stats. databaseOlympics.com
