= Ann Sissons =

New Zealand diver

Personal information
- Born: 25 June 1958 (age 66); Christchurch, New Zealand

Sport
- Sport: Diving

Ann Sissons (née Fargher; born 25 June 1958) is a New Zealand diver and diving official.

== Life ==
Sissons was born in Christchurch in 1958 and attended the University of Canterbury. Sissons was chosen to dive for New Zealand at the 1978 Commonwealth Games at Edmonton and the 1982 Commonwealth Games in Brisbane.

Sissons was the second woman Olympic diver for New Zealand when she dived in the 3 metre springboard event at the Los Angeles Games in 1984.

Sissons moved on to coach and became an official. In 2016 she was given a scholarship to travel to Puerto Rico to refresh her judging skills. Sissons is a member of Wellington Diving Club.
