= Ildikó Kelemen-Kovács =

Hungarian diver

Personal information
- Nationality: Hungarian
- Born: 19 November 1962 (age 62); Budapest, Hungary

Sport
- Sport: Diving

Ildikó Kelemen-Kovács (born 19 November 1962) is a Hungarian diver. She competed at the 1980 Summer Olympics and the 1988 Summer Olympics.
