= Steve Foley (diver) =

Australian diver (born 1957)

Personal information
- Full name: Stephen Neil Foley
- Nationality: Australian
- Born: 11 July 1957 (age 68)

Sport
- Sport: Diving
Medal record
Men's diving
Representing Australia
Commonwealth Games
| Silver medal – second place | 1982 Brisbane | 10 m platform |
| Silver medal – second place | 1982 Brisbane | 3 m springboard |

Stephen Neil Foley (born 11 July 1957) is a former Australian diver. He competed at three successive Olympic Games and three Commonwealth Games.

Foley competed in the springboard and platform events at the 1976, 1980 and 1984 Olympics. In the Commonwealth Games he won silver medals in both events at the 1982 Commonwealth Games in Brisbane, and also competed in 1978 and 1986. He retired after the 1986 games, but remained involved in the sport as a coach. He was Australia's head diving coach at the 1988 Olympics but switched to work for the British diving team in 1999. In 2008 he was appointed as the high performance director by USA Diving.
