= Elsa Tenorio =

Mexican diver

Personal information
- Nationality: Mexican
- Born: 18 May 1963 (age 62)

Sport
- Sport: Diving

Elsa Tenorio (born 18 May 1963) is a Mexican diver. She competed at the 1980 Summer Olympics and the 1984 Summer Olympics.
