= Valerie Beddoe =

Australian diver

Personal information
- Born: Valerie Jane McFarlane; 15 October 1960 (age 65) Cloncurry, Queensland, Australia
- Height: 1.52 m (5 ft 0 in)

Sport
- Country: Australia
- Sport: Diving
- Event: 10 m platform
Medal record
Women's diving
Representing Australia
Commonwealth Games
Gold medal – first place	1982 Brisbane	10 m platform
Silver medal – second place	1978 Edmonton	10 m platform
Silver medal – second place	1986 Edinburgh	10 m platform
Bronze medal – third place	1982 Brisbane	3 m springboard

Valerie Jane Beddoe, AM (née McFarlane, born 15 October 1960) is an Australian former diver who competed in the 1980 and 1984 Summer Olympics, and in three Commonwealth Games. She won a gold medal in the 10m platform at the 1982 Commonwealth Games, having taken silver in the event in 1978. In her title defence in 1986, she came second behind Canada's Debbie Fuller to claim her second Commonwealth silver medal.

Awarded the Australian Sports Medal in 2000, Beddoe was appointed a Member of the Order of Australia in 2001 in recognition of her "service to diving as a competitor, coach and administrator."
