= Chris Snode =

British diver

Personal information
- National team: Great Britain
- Born: 23 March 1959 (age 67) Sutton, London, England
- Height: 1.73 m (5 ft 8 in)
- Weight: 72 kg (159 lb)

Sport
- Sport: Diving
- Event(s): Springboard, 3m Platform, 10m
- College team: University of Florida
- Club: Highgate Diving Club; Crystal Palace Diving Team
Medal record
Men's diving
Representing England
Commonwealth Games
Gold medal – first place	1978 Edmonton	3 m springboard
Gold medal – first place	1978 Edmonton	10 m platform
Gold medal – first place	1982 Brisbane	3 m springboard
Gold medal – first place	1982 Brisbane	10 m platform
Representing Great Britain
FINA Diving World Cup
Gold medal – first place	1979 Woodlands	3 m springboard
European Championships
Bronze medal – third place	1983 Rome	3 m springboard

Christopher Snode (born 23 March 1959) is a former World Cup Champion diver who represented Great Britain and England.

== Diving career ==
He represented Great Britain at the 1976 Summer Olympics, 1980 Summer Olympics, and 1984 Summer Olympics. He represented England at the 1978 and 1982 Commonwealth Games, and won four gold medals. Snode was the University of Florida's first individual NCAA National Champion (1978). At the first-ever FINA Diving World Cup held in The Woodlands, Texas in 1979, Snode became World Cup Champion in the men's three-metres springboard event.

Snode attended the University of Florida in Gainesville, Florida, where he dove for the Florida Gators swimming and diving team in National Collegiate Athletic Association (NCAA) competition from 1977 to 1980. He was recognized as the Southeastern Conference Diver of the Year three consecutive years, received six All-American honors, and was Florida's first individual NCAA National champion (three-metres springboard event in 1978). Snode graduated from the university with a bachelor's degree in fine arts in 1981, and was inducted in the University of Florida Athletic Hall of Fame as a "Gator Great" in 1993.

Snode was a member of the British Olympic team in 1976, 1980 and 1984; he placed among the top ten divers in the world in both platform and springboard diving at the 1980 Summer Olympics in Moscow and the 1984 Olympics in Los Angeles. He was the three-metres springboard and ten-metres platform diving champion at the 1978 Commonwealth Games in Edmonton, and again in both events at the 1982 Commonwealth Games in Brisbane.

Since the early 1990s, Snode has been recognised as a leading Casting Director for sports TV commercials airing worldwide. His casting agency Chris Snode Casting has worked with a variety of award-winning directors and producers. In 2016 TV commercials he cast won 26 awards across three continents. Snode is also an Olympic television commentator and diving pundit for the BBC and EuroSport (1988 to present). Snode was the executive diving consultant in the USA on Eyework's "Splash" reality programme that premiered on ABC, March 19, 2013.

During the COVID-19 period from March 2020 onwards, with no TV or Film work to sustain him, Snode returned to fine art producing 45 large oil on canvas olympic sports paintings in abstract and a second collection of 20 water themed paintings. In July 2021 he open a gallery in Crystal Palace, South London, to display and sell his work. Chris Snode Artist Exhibited artwork at the UTR art exhibition in Bluewater Feb - March 2023

== Honours and recognition ==
- Great Britain's first World Diving Champion 1979
- University of Florida's first NCAA National Champion (individual) 1978
- University of Florida Hall of Fame, inducted as a Gator Great 1993
- Swim England's George Hearn Cup - Honoured a record eight times 1975, 1978 to 1984
- Nominated for Equity / CDA Diversity TV Commercial Casting Award 2016

Nominate best casting of feature film (Feature 83) - Runner up CDA award

== See also ==
- List of University of Florida alumnid
- List of University of Florida Athletic Hall of Fame members
- List of University of Florida Olympians
