= Jordan Windle =

American Olympic diver

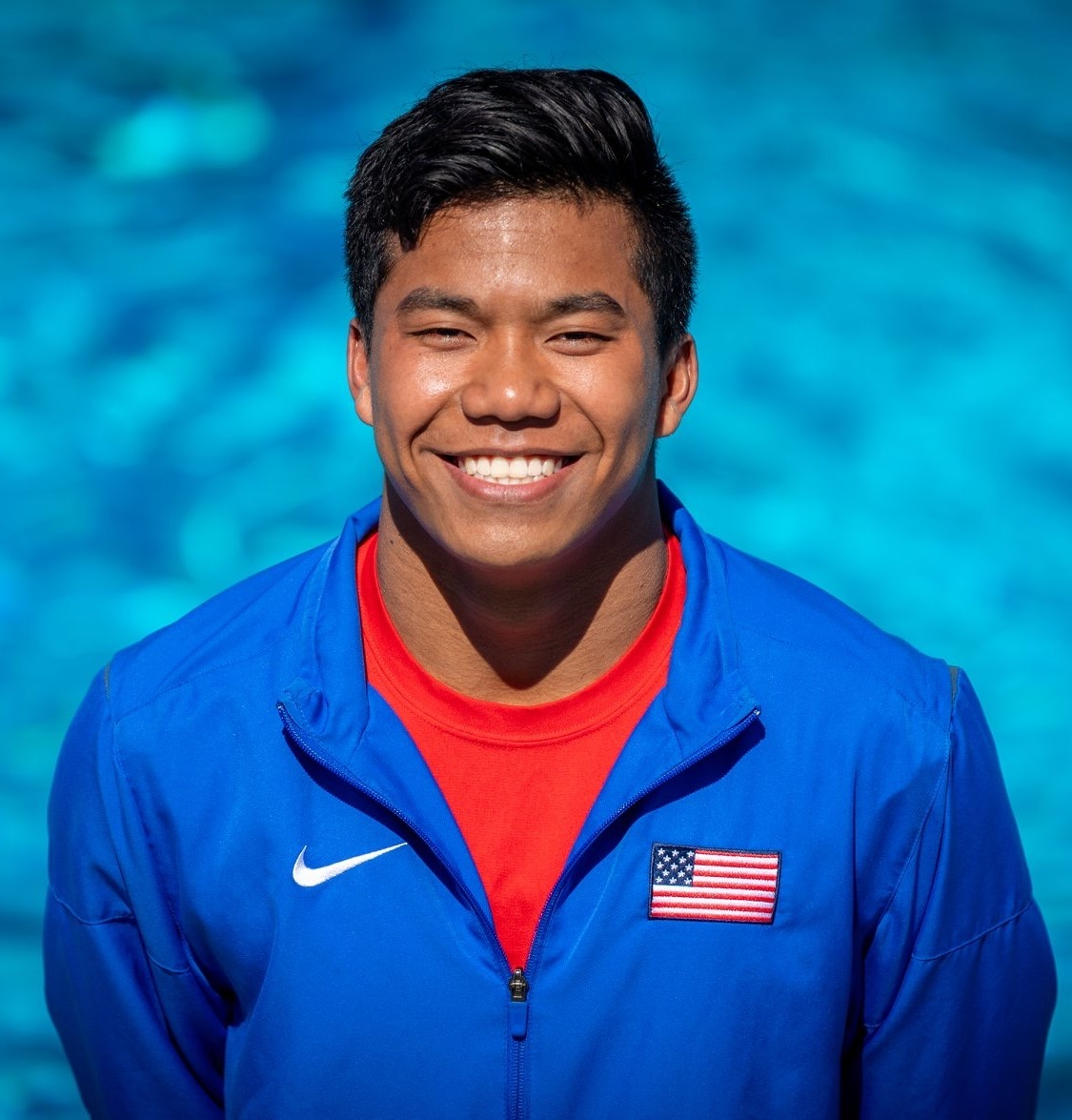

Personal information
- Full name: Jordan Pislow Windle
- Born: November 13, 1998 (age 28) Sihanoukville, Cambodia
- Home town: Fort Lauderdale, Florida
- Height: 165.1 cm (5 ft 5.0 in)

Sport
- Country: United States
- Event: 10 meter platform
- College team: University of Texas

Jordan Pisey Windle (born November 13, 1998) is an American diver. He is the first diver of Cambodian descent to compete in the Olympics. He was the 2019 NCAA Champion in the men's platform event and 2021 NCAA Champion in the men's 1 meter event.

== Early life ==
Jordan was born in Sihanoukville, Cambodia on November 13, 1998. At the age of one, his biological parents died and he was placed in the Women and Children's Vocational Center at Chom Chao. The nannies in the orphanage named him Pisey, which translates to "little darling" in English. When he was 18 months old, he was adopted by Jerry Windle, a single gay man.

== Career ==
When he was seven years old, Jerry enrolled Jordan in the Fort Lauderdale Aquatics Fun Camp in Fort Lauderdale, Florida, where he was noticed by diving coach Tim O'Brien, son of Ron O'Brien, who coached four-time Olympic gold medalist Greg Louganis. O'Brien told Jerry that if he enrolled Jordan into a diving program, he would one day be a National Champion and potentially an Olympian. Jordan's first diving coach was Evan Linette, a former national champion diver. Jordan trained for four years in Fort Lauderdale with Evan and Dave Burgering, 1980 Olympic Team Member, and Olympic diving Coach. Jordan won his first junior national title at nine years old and has been referred to as "Little Louganis" ever since. Jordan appeared in the Disney Channel's "Getcha Head in the Game" when he was ten.

The family then moved to the USA Diving National Training Center in Indianapolis, Indiana, where Jordan trained and qualified to compete at the Olympic Team Trials at age 13. Jordan was named the Grand Marshall of the 2012 Indianapolis Pride Parade Indy Pride Festival. Following the 2012 Olympics, Jordan began training at Duke University under coach Nunzio Esposto before being recruited to dive for the University of Texas and coached by Olympian and Olympic Coach Matt Scoggin. Windle was raised in Fort Lauderdale, Florida. Jordan along with his father, Jerry co-authored the illustrated children's book An Orphan No More: The True Story of a Boy: Chapter One. The book's foreword was written by Louganis.

Windle dives collegiately for the Texas Longhorns. He was the 2019 NCAA Champion in the men's platform event and 2021 NCAA Champion in the men's 1 meter event. He is also a seven-time U.S. Senior National Champion and six time U.S. Junior National Diving Champion. He also holds the NCAA Div 1 records for both the 3m springboard and the platform events. He is the only diver to win Diver of the Year four years in a row in the Big 12 Conference. In 2012 Windle was at the time the youngest person ever to qualify for the U.S. Olympic diving trials.

Windle was a member of the 2021 U.S. Olympic Team representing the United States at the 2020 Summer Olympics in Tokyo in the men's 10 metres platform event in which he finished in ninth place. He is the first diver of Cambodian descent to compete in the Olympics.

=== Permanent ban ===
In December 2021, the United States Center for SafeSport (SafeSport) and the Longhorns placed Windle on "temporary suspension" for "allegations of misconduct", as an investigation continued. In January 2025 he was fully and permanently banned by SafeSport, with a no-contact directive, for "Sexual Misconduct – involving Minors; Inappropriate Conduct; Emotional Misconduct.:

== Personal life ==
Windle was bullied as a child because of his interracial adoption and for having a gay father. Partners (known): None Windle has participated in the It Gets Better Project.
