= Kelly McCormick =

American diver

Personal information
- Full name: Kelly Anne McCormick
- Born: February 13, 1960 (age 66) Anaheim, California, U.S.
- Height: 5 ft 4 in (163 cm)
- Weight: 121 lb (55 kg)

Sport
- Sport: Diving
- Club: McDonald's Divers; Columbus, Ohio
- College team: Ohio State University
- Coach: Ron O'Brien; Vince Panzano, OSU
Medal record
Women's diving
Representing the United States
Olympic Games
Silver medal – second place	1984 Los Angeles	3m Springboard
Bronze medal – third place	1988 Seoul	3m Springboard
Pan American Games
Gold medal – first place	1983 Caracas	3m Springboard
Gold medal – first place	1987 Indianapolis	3m Springboard

Kelly Anne McCormick (born February 13, 1960, in Anaheim, California) is a retired Hall of Fame female diver from the United States. She dived for Ohio State University and twice competed for her native country at the Summer Olympics, winning a silver (1984) and a bronze medal (1988) in the Women's 3m Springboard event.

Kelly is the daughter of the famous diving champion Pat McCormick and diving coach Glenn McCormick. Growing up in Rossmoor, California, in the 1960s and 1970s Kelly's first sport was gymnastics, and by the age of 13 she was an elite gymnast on the same team with Olympian Cathy Rigby. Kelly attended Los Alamitos High School where she began “playing around” with diving and then attended the Ohio State University to be coached by Vince Panzano, a former Ohio State diver. By 1981 she had made the national team, and over the next ten years became a major figure of international status. At Ohio State, McCormick won four Big Ten diving titles in conference competition.

In 1982 Kelly won the first of 9 National Championships (6-3m springboard, 3-10m platform) and an Association for Intercollegiate Athletics for Women 3m springboard championship. In 1983 she won the Pan American Games gold medal, but in 1984 she battled a back injury that hospitalized her for six weeks before the Olympic trials. After being convinced to not quit, she recovered to win the Trials and then the Olympic silver medal on the 3m springboard in Los Angeles behind Canada's Hall of Famer Sylvie Bernier.

In her second Pan American Games (1987, Indianapolis) Kelly took the gold becoming the first woman to win two consecutive Pan Am springboard gold medals. She won the 1988 Olympic trials with a torn calf muscle and the Olympic bronze medal in Seoul behind Hall of Famer Gao Min of China.

She now coaches at the same facility where she had her last meet, the Goodwill Games at the King County Aquatic Center in Federal Way, WA

== Personal life ==
She is married to Matt Robertson and resides in Seattle, Washington.

== See also ==
- List of members of the International Swimming Hall of Fame
