= Mary Ellen Clark =

American diver

Personal information
- Born: December 25, 1962 (age 63) Abington, Pennsylvania
- Height: 155 cm (5 ft 1 in)
- Weight: 54 kg (119 lb)

Sport
- Sport: Diving
- Event(s): 10-meter platform Springboard diving
- College team: Pennsylvania State University
- Club: Mission Bay Makos Divers
- Coached by: Bob Goldberg (Penn State); Ron O'Brien (Mission Bay); Vince Panzano (Ohio State)
Medal record
Women's diving
Representing the United States
Olympic Games
Bronze medal – third place	1992 Barcelona	10 m platform
Bronze medal – third place	1996 Atlanta	10 m platform

Mary Ellen Clark (born December 25, 1962) is an American diver who won a bronze medal in 10-meter platform in both the 1992 and 1996 Summer Olympics. After retiring as a diving competitor, in 2004 she worked as a diving coach at Amherst and Mount Holyoke Colleges, and later at Wellesley College from 2012 to 2014. She has been the diving coach at Bryant University since 2024.

== Early life ==
Clark was born on December 25, 1962, in Abington, Pennsylvania to a family of seven. Likely influencing her future athletic focus, her father Gene was an accomplished diver and team captain at Penn State University. Beginning to dive at the age of seven, she attended the national championships at age 10 and won a national championship at 15. She attended Radnor High School, where she was a State Champion as a Senior, graduating in 1981.

She received her B.S. in Health and Physical Education in 1985 from Pennsylvania State University where she competed for the Lady Lion's Head Coach Bob Goldberg, and Assistant Coach Nancy Jannarone. As a Freshman in mid-March, 1982, she won titles in both the 1 and 3-meter springboard at the Eastern Association Championship, as part of Intercollegiate Athletics for Women, qualifying for the National Championships in Austin, Texas. At Pennsylvania State, Clark was swim team captain her senior year. After graduating Pen State, and focusing more on the platform event, she was a National Champion in Platform diving in 1987, and 1992.

Clark attended the 1988 Olympic trials but finished seventh in her specialty, the 10-meter platform, putting her well out of the running to qualify. In an equally disappointing turn of events, she left the trials suffering from a left shoulder injury which required surgery, but she eventually recovered.

She received her M.S. in Health and Physical Education from Ohio State University in 1991, where she continued to train as an elite diver with OSU Diving Coach Vince Panzano. After completing her master's degree and training with Vince Panzano at Ohio State, she moved to Florida to train with Ron O'Brien's Mission Bay Diving Team around 1991.

== Olympics ==
She won Olympic bronze medals in 10-meter platform diving at the 1992 and 1996 Summer Olympics.

=== Diving highlights ===
She suffered with vertigo, which resulted in dizzy spells that began to bother her in 1992. She missed all of the 1995 season as they increased in frequency. She went through natural holistic therapies to treat her disorder, and resumed her diving career.( Source: "Radical Cures." from A&E Channel program. "Mysteries of the Unexplained". uploaded from doc spots in YouTube)

She was a member of the United States National Diving Team beginning in 1996. She was a three-time member of the United States Pan American Team and a seven-time National Champion. Clark won seven US titles, five on platform and two in springboard diving. In 1994 she was a triple national champion, winning the platform and taking first-place finishes on both the 1 and 3-meter springboards.

=== Coaching diving ===
She began as the Head Diving Coach at Amherst College and Mount Holyoke College in 2004, and served as the diving coach at Amherst Regional High School (Amherst, Massachusetts).

She coached three Amherst College divers to NCAA Division III Nationals qualifications in the 2007–2008 season, and one of her divers, Kai Robinson, was the 2008 NCAA Division III Men's National Diving Champion on both the 1 and 3 meter boards.

She coached the Wellesley College diving team from 2012 to 2014.

She has been the coach at Bryant University since 2024.

=== Honors ===
Clark was voted one of the "Top-10 women athletes in America" in 1996" by the USOC. In 2008, Clark received New England Small College Athletic Conference Diving Coach of the Year honors, as well as NCAA Division III Diving Coach of the Year honors.

== See also ==
- List of Pennsylvania State University Olympians
- List of divers
