= Breaking the Surface: The Greg Louganis Story =

1997 Canadian TV film

- DVD cover
- Genre: Biographical drama
- Based on: Breaking the Surface by: Greg Louganis; Eric Marcus
- Written by: Alan Hines
- Directed by: Steven Hilliard Stern
- Starring: Mario Lopez; Michael Murphy; Jeffrey Meek; Rosemary Dunsmore; Aki Aleong; Bruce Weitz
- Music by: Richard Bellis
- Country of origin: United States
- Original language: English

Production
- Executive producers: Allen S. Epstein; Jim Green
- Producer: Mark Bacino
- Cinematography: Michael Slovis
- Editor: Peter Svab
- Running time: 95 minutes
- Production companies: World International Network; Green/Epstein Productions

Original release
- Network: USA Network
- Release: March 19, 1997

Breaking the Surface: The Greg Louganis Story is a 1997 American biographical drama television film starring Mario Lopez as American diver Greg Louganis. It was directed by Steven Hilliard Stern and written by Alan Hines, based on the 1996 best-selling memoir Breaking the Surface by Louganis and Eric Marcus. Michael Murphy, Jeffrey Meek, Rosemary Dunsmore, Aki Aleong, and Bruce Weitz co-star.

This was the final film Stern directed before his death in 2018. It aired on the USA Network on March 19, 1997.

== Plot ==
In Seoul, 1988, Greg Louganis hits the diving board while plunging towards the water, cutting his head open. Splashing into the water, Greg begins to have flashbacks: as a young kid being ridiculed by neighborhood bullies; his adoptive father is not accepting and overbearing; winning the silver medal; the 1982 world championship; two gold medals in the 1984 Summer Olympics in Los Angeles; the struggles of an abusive relationship with Tom Barrett; his father's terminal cancer; Tom's losing battle with AIDS and Greg's own HIV positive status. After doctors in Seoul stitch Greg's head wound, he returns to competition and picks up two more gold medals. After his father's death and Tom's lost AIDS' battle, Greg decides to come out and go public with every aspect of his life as a gay athlete.

== Cast ==
- Mario Lopez as Greg Louganis
- Michael Murphy as Pete Louganis
- Jeffrey Meek as Tom Barrett
- Rosemary Dunsmore as Frances Louganis
- Aki Aleong as Dr. Sammy Lee
- Bruce Weitz as Ron O'Brien
- Megan Leitch as Megan Neyer
- Jonathan Scarfe as Keith
- Fulvio Cecere as John Anders
- Patrick David as Young Greg Louganis
- Rafael Rojas III as Greg (age 9)
- Gregor Trpin as Scott Cranham
- Greg Louganis as himself

== Awards ==
Mario López was nominated for an ALMA Award for "Outstanding Individual Performance in a Made-for-Television Movie or Mini-Series in a Crossover Role".
