= Patrick Jeffrey =

American diver (born 1965)

Patrick Steven Jeffrey
Personal information
- Born: June 25, 1965 (age 60) Madison, New Jersey
- Height: 168 cm (5 ft 6 in)
- Weight: 68 kg (150 lb)

Sport
- Event: Platform diving
- College team: Ohio State University 1988
- Club: Morningside Diving Association
- Coached by: Vince Panzano (OSU); Jim Stillson (Morningside)
Medal record
Men's diving
Representing the United States
Pan American Games
Bronze medal – third place	1991 Havana	10m Platform
Bronze medal – third place	1995 Mar del Plata	10m Platform

Patrick S. Jeffrey (born June 24, 1965) is a retired diver from the United States who competed for Ohio State University and participated in Platform diving for the U.S. team in the 1988 and 1996 Olympics. Excelling as a coach, he would later coach diving at Florida State from 1999 to 2014, at the 2000 Sydney Olympics and at Stanford University after 2014.

Jeffrey began diving around the age of 12 as a sixth-grade student. As a High School athlete, he swam for both Madison High School and the Morningside Diving Association of New York where he was trained and mentored by Coach Jim Stillson. Stillson was a former OSU diver, who was the diving coach at Columbia University while mentoring Jeffrey, and later at Southern Methodist University.

== Early life ==
Jeffrey won the New Jersey Junior Olympics in the three-meter springboard, and took third place finishes in the three-meter event at both the '81 and '82 National Junior Olympics. He also captured a third place in the three-meter event as part of the Junior National Team in Mexico City. Representing Madison High, he won two consecutive Eastern Regional titles in the one-meter event, and was named All-State in both his Junior and Senior years. To remain competitive, he completed two-hour practices four days a week with New York's Morningside Diving Association coached by Jim Stillson, though it required a one hour commute each way. The summer practices were longer, and performed six days a week.

== Ohio State ==
As a college athlete on the Ohio State University swimming & diving team under Head Coach Vince Panzano, where he was a 1988 graduate, he swept the three diving events (one-meter, three-meter and platform) at the Big Ten championship his senior year and was named conference Diver of the Year. Jeffrey graduated a decorated diver from Ohio State in 1988. At OSU, Jeffrey was a three-time All-American in 1985-86, and 88, and a four-year letterwinner. He was a U.S. National Diving Champion for three years on the 10-meter platform and twice in the 3-meter event. In his last season, he became the only diver to sweep the NCAA diving titles (1-meter, 3-meter, and platform); a remarkable record he continues to hold.

== Olympics ==
He twice competed for his native country at the Summer Olympics, in both the 1988 Seoul and the 1996 in Atlanta Olympics. In the 1988 Olympics, he finished twelfth in 10-meter platform diving event, and in the 1996 Olympics, he finished ninth in the same event, just one place behind qualifying for the final heat. During the 1996 Olympics, he was already out and performed as an openly gay athlete.

Jeffrey twice won a bronze medal in 10-meter platform diving at the Pan American Games, both in 1991 at La Habana Province, Cuba and in 1995 at Mar del Plata, Argentina.

== Coaching diving ==
He coached at Florida Atlantic University from 1996-99. From 1999 to 2014, he was the diving coach at Florida State University, where during his coaching tenure, the team dominated the Atlantic Coast Conference.

In August 2014, he moved to Stanford University, where he is Head Diving Coach of the men's and women's collegiate teams. He also owns the Stanford Diving Club, which consists of teams of junior, senior, and masters divers who compete at the national and international level.

=== Olympic diving coach ===
As a result of conference performance, he became recognized nationally and coached the U.S. Olympic Diving team at the Sydney Olympics in 2000.

=== Diving community ===
In addition to college coaching, since starting as coach at Florida State, he was Team USA’s head coach at the 2013 World University Games. He also served on staff at the 2009 World Championship, the 2001 World Championship, and the 2007 World Student Games. More impressively he was on staff at the 2000 Olympics and the 1999 U.S. World Cup.

=== Honors ===
In 2005 Jeffrey was elected to The Ohio State Athletic Hall of Fame. In High School, he was a New Jersey All-State diver in both his Junior and Senior years. As a collegiate athlete in his Senior year in 1988, he may be best known for becoming the only athlete to ever win NCAA diving titles in the 1-meter, 3-meter, and platform events, sweeping the diving competition.
