= David Pichler (diver) =

American diver (born 1968)

Personal information
- Nationality: American
- Born: September 3, 1968 (age 57) Butler, Pennsylvania, United States
- Height: 183 cm (6 ft 0 in)
- Weight: 77 kg (170 lb)

Sport
- Sport: Diving
- Event: Synchronized platform diving
- College team: Ohio State University
- Club: Pitt Aquatics Club
- Coached by: Julian Krug (Pitt Aquatics); Vince Panzano (OSU)

David John Pichler (born September 3, 1968) was an American diver for Ohio State University and an Olympic diving competitor representing the United States in 1996 Summer Olympics in Atlanta and the 2000 Summer Olympics in Sydney, where Pichler was elected team captain.

== Early swimming ==
Born in Butler, Pennsylvania on September 3, 1968, in his earliest years, Pichler swam for the Butler YMCA.

In 1985, swimming for Butler High School, Pichler was runner-up for the WPIAL diving championship, and in the Pennsylvania State Meet finished third. In March 1986, Pichler won the State Championship diving tournament earning 459.75 points, a state record. Beginning in High School Freshman year, Pichler trained in diving with Julian Krug at Pitt Aquatics Club, a highly competitive program that had produced Boy's state champions for three successive years. Pichler likely did the majority of his training at Pitt Aquatic Club practices. Krug also coached the swimming team at the University of Pittsburgh and was a former coach for the Naval Academy swim team.

Pichler attended Ohio State University, where he swam for Coach Vince Panzano, a former Ohio State diver. At Ohio State, Pichler was a 1991 NCAA National titlist. He returned to train with Panzano prior to the 1996 Olympics. He had formerly trained with Ron O'Brien in Fort Lauderdale for three years with the U.S. National Team, but was very unhappy with O'Brien's coaching style. He also trained with talented diving coach Randy Ablemen in Miami.

== International competition ==
In 1992, Pichler unsuccessfully participated in the Olympic trials, but finished seventh, and may have been suffering from the flu.

In 1994, Pichler participated in the World Championships in Rome.

=== Olympics ===
In the 1996 Olympic Trials, Pichler placed second in the 10-meter platform finals behind Patrick Jeffrey.

In the 1996 Summer Olympics in Atlanta, Pichler placed sixth in Platform diving, and in the 2000 Summer Olympics in Sydney, Pichler placed ninth in platform diving, seventh in synchronized platform diving, and fourth in synchronized springboard diving, in one of his best performances. In the 2000 Olympics, Pichler served as team captain.

Pichler and Mark Ruiz won the synchronized platform final at the FINA-USA Diving Grand Prix in May 2000 scored 301.26 points, ahead of 298.50 for Australians Mathew Helm and Robert Newbery. In 1996, he publicly came out as gay.
