= Diving at the 1983 Pan American Games =

This page shows the results of the Diving Competition for men and women at the 1983 Pan American Games, held from August 14 to August 29, 1983 in Caracas, Venezuela. There were two events, for both men and women.

== Medal table ==
Place	Nation	Gold medal	Silver medal	Bronze medal	Total
1	United States	4	2	1	7
2	Cuba	0	1	0	1
2	Argentina	0	1	0	1
4	Mexico	0	0	2	2
5	Canada	0	0	1	1
Total		4	4	4	12

== Medalists ==
=== Men ===
Event	Gold	Silver	Bronze
3m springboard	Greg Louganis; United States	Abel Ramírez; Cuba	David Burgering; United States
10m platform	Greg Louganis; United States	Bruce Kimball; United States	Ricardo Banuelos; Mexico

=== Women ===
Event	Gold	Silver	Bronze
3m springboard	Kelly McCormick; United States	Wendy Wyland; United States	Sylvie Bernier; Canada
10m platform	Wendy Wyland; United States	Verónica G. Ribot de Cañales; Argentina	Guadalupe Canseco; Mexico

== See also ==
- Diving at the 1984 Summer Olympics
