= Jim Stillson =

American diving coach

Biographical details
- Born: circa 1953; Aberdeen, Maryland
- Education: Ohio State University 1974

Playing career
- 1970-1974: Ohio State University
- Positions: Diver, 3-meter board

Coaching career (HC unless noted)
- 1984-2017: Southern Methodist University; Diving Coach
- 1987-1991 1997: U.S. Diving National Team; Diving Coach

Accomplishments and honors

Awards
- 3 x NCAA Diving Coach of the Year; 16 x Conference Coach of the Year; 1992 Mike Malone Memorial Award; 1999 USOC Diving Coach of the Year; 2015 Swim. Hall of Fame Paragon Award; 2017 Phil Boggs Award

Jim Stillson is an American former competition diver for Ohio State University, who coached the Southern Methodist University Diving team for thirty-three years from 1984 through 2017, where twenty-one of his divers won 89 conference championships, and ten of his divers won U.S. National Championships. Recognized for outstanding contributions to sport of Diving, two years before his retirement from coaching at SMU he received the Paragon Award from the International Swimming Hall of Fame in 2015.

Born in Aberdeen, Maryland, Stillson received All-American honors as a competitor at Cambell, California's Campbell High School, and attended and swam for Ohio State University where he earned All-America honors from the National Collegiate Athletic Association (NCAA) on the 3 meter board his senior year, graduating in 1974.

== Coaching ==
After collegiate competition, he began coaching diving at Barnard College by 1976, and then did a longer stint as Diving Coach at Columbia University, where he also coached an AAU age group team that met at Columbia. From 1984 to 2017, he coached at Southern Methodist University. While at SMU, in 1989, Stillson was named the NCAA Men's Diving Coach of the Year and subsequently the NCAA Women's Diving Coach of the Year in 1990 and 1995. During his SMU Coaching tenure, his athletes earned 88 all-America honors, and the men's and women's teams won a total of 32 conference championships.

Upon his retirement in July 1997, SMU Head Swimming Coach Eddie Sinnott, who knew him well, remarked "He (Stillson) has impacted so many people, young and old, over the last three-plus decades here on the Hilltop, and I am sure he will continue to do that as he moves into the next phase of his life. I have no doubt that we will continue to feel Jim's presence around SMU for years to come."

== International coaching ==
From 1987 to 1991, Stillson was a U.S. Diving National Team coach and served again in 1997, where he led events in Europe, Australia, China and the Soviet Union, as well as other countries. He was also selected as a team leader for the USA Diving team at the 2007 Pan American Games in Rio de Janeiro, Brazil.

== Service to the swimming community ==
He served as a member of the UANA (Union Americana de Natacion) Technical Diving Committee, which manages the Pan Am Games, and was on the Board of Trustees of the United States Diving Foundation. He was a member of the USA Diving's board of directors for USA Diving where he was on the numerous committees including the rules, senior diving, and the judges certification committee. He was the team leader for the 2007 Pan American Games in 2007 and the World Championships teams in 2015.

=== Outstanding divers ===
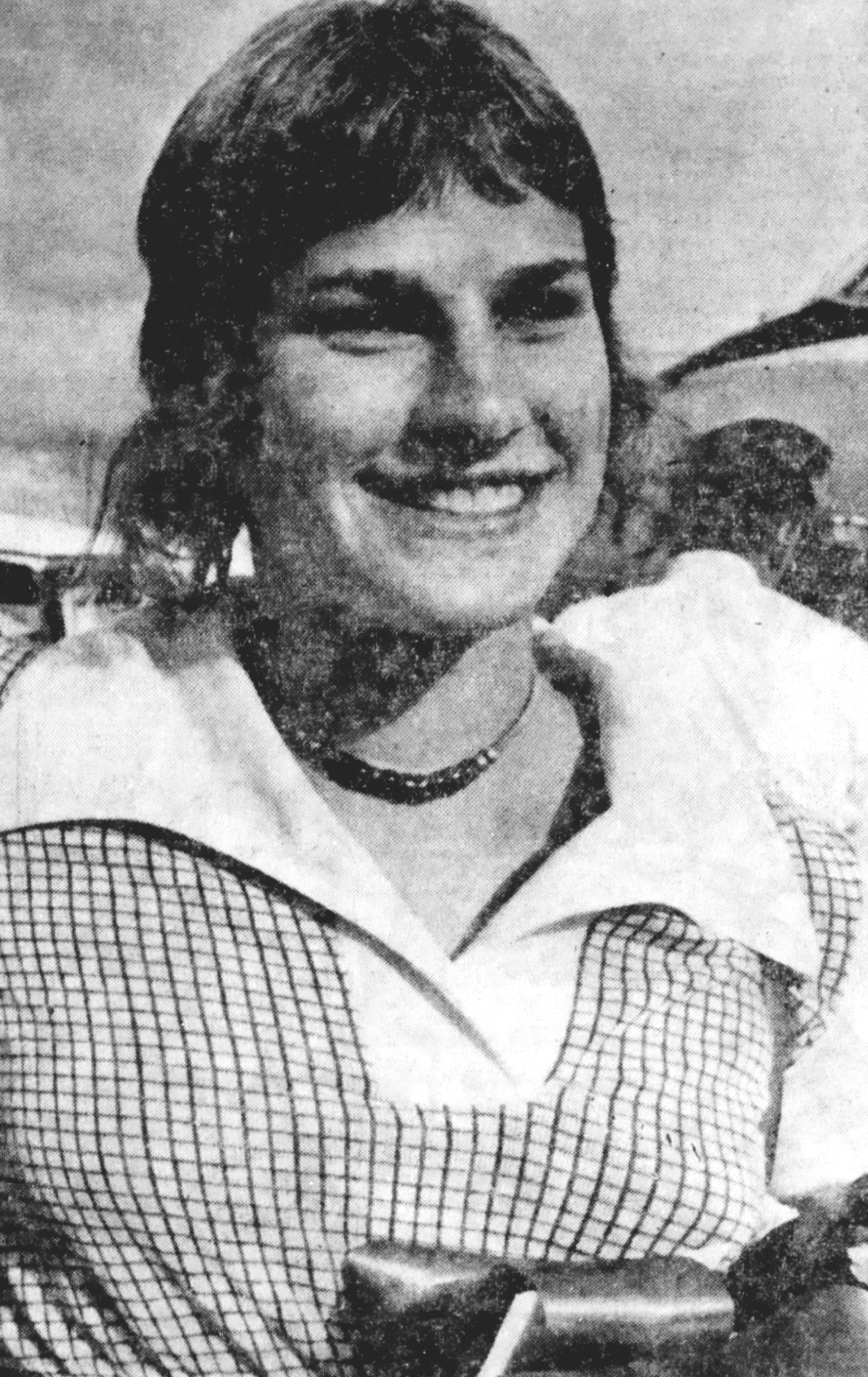
Janet Ely in 1972

Stillson mentored Olympian Scott Donie (USA) at the age group team at Columbia. Donie competed at the 1992 Barcelona and 1996 Atlanta Olympic Games, and won silver in Platform diving in 1992. He had a career as a diving coach at Columbia, as did Stillson.

Stillson also mentored 1996 Olympians Ali Al-Hasan a springboard diver on the Kuwaiti team and Tony Iglesias of the Bolivian team. Stillson coached 1988 and 1996 Olympic participant Patrick Jeffrey at his age group swim club that met at Columbia, usually known as Morningside Divers, during Jeffery's Sophomore through Senior years in High School from around 1981-1983. Jeffery, a 1988 Big 10 Conference diver of the year, dove in the 10-meter platform event in both of his Olympic years, finishing 12th in Seoul in 1988 and 9th in Atlanta in 1996. Among his women's divers, he coached Janet Ely who dove for SMU from 1979-80. Ely was the first female SMU diver to represent the United States at the Olympics. At the 1972 Munich Olympics, Ely took a fourth place in both the springboard and platform events, just missing a bronze medal and placed 9th in the 10 meter platform at the 1976 Montreal Olympics.

=== Honors ===
Stillson's honors as a diving coach were extensive and reflected his major contributions to the sport. In 1992, the national governing body of the diving community presented him with the Mike Malone Memorial Award, for making exceptional contributions to diving. In 2015, Stillson was honored by the International Swimming Hall of Fame with the Paragon Award. In 2017, Stillson was awarded the Phil Boggs award presented by USA Diving for service to the diving community and excellence in coaching.
