= Kent Vosler =

American diver (born 1955)

Personal information
- Nationality: American
- Born: December 6, 1955 (age 70) Eaton, Ohio, United States
- Height: 165 cm (5 ft 5 in)
- Weight: 61 kg (134 lb)

Sport
- Sport: Diving
- Event: 10-meter platform
- College team: Ohio State University
- Club: Ron O'Brien Diving School
- Coached by: Vince Panzano
Medal record
Representing the United States
Pan American Games
Bronze medal – third place	1975 Mexico City	10m platform
Universiade
Gold medal – first place	1977 Sofia	10m platform

Kent Douglas Vosler (born December 6, 1955) was an American former diver for Ohio State University and a 1976 Montreal Olympic diving competitor for the United States on the 10-meter platform. He later coached diving and practiced medicine in Glendale, Arizona.

Vosler was born in Dayton, Ohio, and attended Ohio State University, where he was coached by Vince Panzano, a former Ohio State diver. At the 1977 NCAA Championships, he placed second on the 1-metre springboard. He placed third on the 3-metre springboard at the 1974 NCAAs Championships. Later in his career, participating in his best event, he captured four national titles on platform.

== International competition ==
Vosler competed in the 1976 Summer Olympics in Montreal, where he placed 4th in the men's 10 metre platform, just missing the bronze medal.

At the 1975 Pan American Games he won a bronze medal in the 10 m platform. At the 1977 Summer Universiade he won a gold medal in the 10 m platform.

== Honors ==
In 1977, Vosler was named Diver-of-the-Year by Swimming World magazine.

== Later life ==
Due to the Olympic boycott, Vosler could not participate in the 1980 Olympic Games in Moscow. After retiring from competition, he coached at the University of South Carolina for one year and for six seasons at the University of Florida, earning a Master's Degree in exercise and sports sciences in 1986. He then returned to medical school, and in 1992 earned a D.O. degree from Kirksville College of Osteopathic Medicine. He eventually practiced family medicine in Glendale, Arizona.
