= 1945 NCAA swimming and diving championships =

American college aquatic sports competition

- Host city: Ann Arbor, Michigan
- Date(s): March 1945
- Venue(s): Intramural Sports Building; University of Michigan
- Teams: 13
- Events: 11

The 1945 NCAA swimming and diving championships were contested in March 1945 at the Intramural Sports Building at the University of Michigan in Ann Arbor, Michigan at the ninth annual NCAA-sanctioned swim meet to determine the team and individual national champions of men's collegiate swimming and diving among its member programs in the United States.

Ohio State topped hosts, and rivals, Michigan in the team standings, the second team national title for the Buckeyes.

== Team standings ==
- (H) = Hosts
- (DC) = Defending champions
- Italics = Debut appearance

Rank	Team	Points
1st place, gold medalist(s)	Ohio State	56
2nd place, silver medalist(s)	Michigan (H)	48
3rd place, bronze medalist(s)	Cornell	25
4	Michigan State	24
4	Minnesota	24
6	Columbia	10
7	Canisius	8
7	Northwestern	8
7	Princeton	8
10	Indiana	6
11	Purdue	3
12	Iowa	2
12	RPI	2

- DNQ = Yale (DC)

== Individual events ==
=== Swimming ===
Event	Champion	Team	Time
50-yard freestyle	Merton Church	Michigan	23.2
100-yard freestyle	Merton Church	Michigan	52.3
220-yard freestyle	Eugene Rogers (DC)	Columbia	2:14.6
440-yard freestyle	Seymour Schlanger	Ohio State	4:55.4
1,500-meter freestyle	Seymour Schlanger	Ohio State	20:11.4
150-yard backstroke	James Shand	Princeton	1:41.8
200-yard butterfly	Paul Murray	Cornell	2:31.2
400-yard freestyle relay	Charles Fries; William Breen; Gurdon Pulford; Merton Church	Michigan (DC)	3:39.8
300-yard medley relay	Gurdon Pulford; Heini Kessler; Charles Fries	Michigan	3:05.2

=== Diving ===
Event	Champion	Team	Score
One-meter diving	Hobart Billingsley	Ohio State	121.90
Three-meter diving	Hobart Billingsley	Ohio State	132.10

== See also ==
- List of college swimming and diving teams
