= Breaking the Surface =

- Author: Greg Louganis co-writer: Eric Marcus
- Language: English
- Genre: Autobiography
- Publisher: Plume
- Publication date: 1 March 1995
- Publication place: United States
- Media type: Hardcover, paperback
- Pages: 320
- ISBN: 0-452-27590-3
- OCLC: 33817635

Breaking the Surface is a best-selling book by Greg Louganis, co-written with Eric Marcus published in 1995. The book spent five weeks at number one on the New York Times Best Seller list.

Louganis chronicles his winning of back-to-back double gold medals at the 1984 Summer Olympics and 1988 Summer Olympics, and his self-doubt and lack of confidence that held him back personally and professionally because of concealing his sexual orientation as a gay athlete. This is about him coming out as an HIV-positive gay man.

As a follow-up to the success of the book, Canadian television and film director Steven Hilliard Stern directed Breaking the Surface: The Greg Louganis Story in 1997, starring Mario Lopez as Louganis, with Louganis also appearing in certain scenes of the television film and as narrator. Louganis also produced a video diary called Looking To the Light, which picked up where Breaking the Surface left off.
