= Guadalupe Canseco =

Mexican diver

Personal information
- Born: January 25, 1962 (age 64)
Medal record
Women's diving
Representing Mexico
Pan American Games
Bronze medal – third place	1983 Caracas	10m Platform

Guadalupe Canseco (born January 25, 1962) is a retired female diver from Mexico. She competed in two consecutive Summer Olympics for her native country, starting in 1980. She claimed a bronze medal in the Women's 10m Platform at the 1983 Pan American Games.
