= Hobie Billingsley =

American diver (1926–2022)

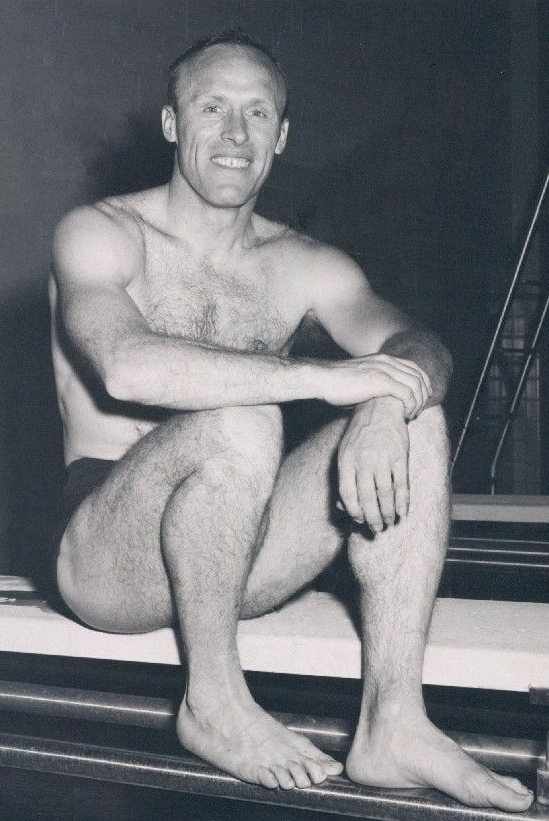
- Billingsley in 1963

Personal information
- Born: December 2, 1926 Erie, Pennsylvania, U.S.
- Died: July 16, 2022 (aged 95) Bloomington, Indiana, U.S.
Medal record
Men's diving
Representing Ohio State
NCAA
Gold medal – first place	1945 Ann Arbor	One-meter diving
Gold medal – first place	1945 Ann Arbor	Three-meter diving

Hobart Sherwood Billingsley (December 2, 1926 – July 16, 2022) was an American diver for Ohio State University and a Hall of Fame coach for Indiana University from 1959-1989, where he led the Hoosiers to six NCAA national swimming and diving team championships. During his time with Indiana, he coached the U.S. Olympic diving team in 1968, 1972, and 1976.

== Early life ==
Billingsley was born to James and Wenonah (Willing) Billingsley in Erie, Pennsylvania, on December 2, 1926. He taught himself how to dive by analyzing wallcharts at his local YMCA. During his final year of high school in 1943, he finished in third place at the national championships.

Billingsley attended Ohio State University (OSU), where he won the NCAA one-and three-meter titles during his freshman year in 1945. After putting his studies on hold to enlist in the United States Armed Forces, Billingsley served in Japan during World War II before completing his studies at OSU. He subsequently undertook postgraduate studies at the University of Washington and obtained a master's degree.

== Career ==
Billingsley first worked as a high school teacher and coach. He was the swimming and diving coach at Allen Park High School in Wayne County, Michigan from 1955 to 1957, where he built a swimming program that led to the Michigan High School Boys State Championship. He was subsequently recruited by James Counsilman, the head swimming coach at Indiana University who created the new position of diving coach for Billingsley. In the 1960s, Billingsley performed for the Aqua Follies at the Seafair, a water ballet show including diving acts produced by Al Sheehan.

=== Dive coaching ===
Billingsley served as the Indiana Hoosiers’s diving coach from 1959 to 1989, leading the Hoosiers to six NCAA and 23 Big Ten team championships.

During his time at Indiana, he coached the United States Olympic diving team at the 1968, 1972, and 1976 Summer Games. Divers under his tutelage won 115 national diving titles and seven Olympic medals. His Olympic gold and bronze medalists include Lesley Bush, Kenneth Sitzberger, Mark Lenzi (twice), Cynthia Potter, Edwin Young, and Jim Henry. Billingsley coached diver Russ Bertram at Indiana from 1986-1989, a talented diver who would have an accomplished career as an Olympic and collegiate dive coach with the University of Arizona from 2006-2013, and with Denison University after 2013. He later established the World Diving Coaches Association in 1968 and the American Coaches Diving Association two years later. He was regarded as one of the most influential figures in the history of diving. He was profiled in the award-winning and widely televised documentary Hobie’s Heroes — 25th Anniversary Edition, which depicts the struggles and successes of young divers training under this legendary coach. The title was derived from the nickname he gave to his divers.

== Later life ==
Following retirement from university coaching, Billingsley continued to be active in the sport, training divers and coaches around the world, and was a respected speaker on diving history, technique, ethics, and general sports. His book Diving Illustrated, a seminal work offering detailed technical support for coaching diving, was released in 1990, with the second edition published in 2018.

== Personal life ==
Billingsley married Mary Drake in 1952, whom he met in college. The couple had three children.

He was diagnosed with myasthenia gravis in July 2018 and hospitalized. He died on July 16, 2022, in Bloomington, at age 95.

== Honors and awards ==
Billingsley was inducted into the International Swimming Hall of Fame in 1983 and the Ohio State Varsity O Hall of Fame in 1989. He was given the Sammy Lee Award, the most esteemed award in diving, in 1994. That same year, he was enshrined in the Indiana University Athletics Hall of Fame. At the 1996 Atlanta Summer Olympics, he took the oath on behalf of all judges. The Counsilman–Billingsley Aquatics Center at Indiana University is named in his honor, as is an award bestowed by the Indiana High School Swimming and Diving Hall of Fame.

== See also ==
- List of members of the International Swimming Hall of Fame
