= Ali Al-Hasan =

Kuwaiti diver

Personal information
- Nationality: Kuwait
- Born: 4 January 1973 (age 53)

Sport
- Sport: Diving
- Event: Springboard
- College team: Southern Methodist University
- Coached by: Jim Stillson (SMU)

Ali Al-Hasan (born 4 January 1973) is a Kuwaiti diver who dove for Southern Methodist University and competed with the Kuwaiti diving team in the 1996 Summer Olympics in Atlanta.

== Diving for Southern Methodist ==
Al-Hasan attended and dove for Southern Methodist University where he majored in biomedical engineering. At SMU he swam for long-serving Coach Jim Stillson, an All American diver for Ohio State University, and a former diving coach for Columbia University.

An accomplished diver for SMU, at the Southwestern Conference Swimming and Diving Championships in March, 1995, Al-Hasan edged out rival University of Texas diver Sam Arieff in close competition, winning the 1-meter diving event. He placed third in diving in the Southwestern Conference Championship that year, helping to lead SMU to a second place overall against strong rival University of Texas. At the March 1997, Western Athletic Conference Championships, Al-Hasan won the 1-meter springboard competition, with a 580.8 total.

At the Reveille Invitational, a regional meet in Texas in November 1995, he placed first in the diving competition with 484.7 points, leading SMU to win the meet. At the March 1996, Zone D Championships in Fort Worth, Ali-Hasan placed third in the three-meter diving final. In his Senior year at SMU, he placed first in 3-meter diving in a dual meet with Rice University in January, 1995, leading SMU to a dual meet win. At the January, 1995 All American Diving Finals in Austin, Texas, Al-Hasan placed 22, a respectable finish for a nation-wide meet of outstanding divers.

He was a member of the Kuwaiti Diving Team. During the Persian Gulf War around 1990-91, he was imprisoned in Iraq for two weeks, but his training with the Kuwaiti team was interrupted for close to a year. After his release from prison, he looked forward to swimming for Kuwait in the 1996 Atlanta Olympics.

== 1996 Olympics ==
In the 1996 Atlanta Olympics, Al-Hasan placed 33rd in men's springboard.
