= Wendy Wyland =

American diver

Personal information
- Full name: Janna Wendy Wyland
- Born: November 25, 1964 Jackson, Michigan, US
- Died: 27 September 2003 (aged 38) Webster, New York, US
- Height: 159 cm (5 ft 3 in)
- Weight: 50 kg (110 lb)
- Spouse: David Vanderwoude (m 2000)

Sport
- Country: USA
- Sport: Diving
- Event(s): 10 m Platform, Springboard
- Club: Mission Viejo Nadadores Diving; Mission Bay Divers, Boca Raton
- Coached by: B. Perkins (Perkins Swim); R. O'Brien (Nadadores, Mis. Bay)
Medal record
Women's diving
Representing the United States
Olympic Games
Bronze medal – third place	1984 Los Angeles	10 m Platform
World Championships
Gold medal – first place	1982 Guayaquil	10 m Platform
Bronze medal – third place	1986 Madrid	10 m Platform
Pan American Games
Gold medal – first place	1983 Caracas	10 m Platform
Silver medal – second place	1983 Caracas	3 m Springboard
Universiade
Bronze medal – third place	1983 Edmonton	10 m platform

Janna Wendy Wyland (November 25, 1964 – September 27, 2003), also known by her married name Wendy van der Woude, after 2000, was a female diver from the United States who won a bronze medal in 10-meter Platform diving at the 1984 Los Angeles Summer Olympics. She was coached after 14, by Hall of Fame dive coach Ron O'Brien and was a World Aquatics Champion in the ten-meter platform with a gold in 1982, and a silver in 1986. After graduating Florida Atlantic University in 1989 and receiving a Masters from the University of Texas, she would briefly operate Webster Aquatic Center, in Webster, New York, and coach diving at the Rochester Institute of Technology.

== Early life ==
Wyland was born into a family of with three other siblings in Jackson, Michigan on November 25, 1964, to parents Vernon and Beth Wyland. A younger sister would be a competitive swimmer in the early 80's, and an older sister would later attend the University of California, Irvine. The family moved to Penfield, New York around 1970 where Wendy began training at six with well-known Coach Betty Perkins-Carpenter and the Perkins Swim Club. Perkins was also the dive coach at Penfield High School. As a youngster at ten, Wyland would swim with the Penfield Swamp Rats, taking a 38.40 in the 50-meter butterfly. Wyland would attend Penfield Junior High.

=== Early gymnastics, diving ===
Wyland competed in gymnastics at the age of ten and in August, 1975, took a seventh place in trampoline while representing Penfield in the National Junior Olympics in Ithaca, New York. By 12, Wyland had won gold and silver medals off the one and three-meter boards in international age-group competition, and held age-group titles in tumbling. By 1977, she had won national age group titles in trampoline and mini-trampoline, and was second in the national open trampoline, and synchronized trampoline. In August 1978, at age 13, Wyland qualified in diving for both the AAU Jr. Olympics in Lincoln, Nebraska, and the more exclusive age-group National Championship where she could capture a berth on the U.S. National Team. At Colorado Springs's National Sports Festival, Wyland placed ninth in diving competition in the summer of 1978.

While at Penfield's Junior High, Wyland requested to dive with the Varsity team at Penfield High School, but was denied the opportunity due to her age. Perkins-Carpenter recognized her early talent and noticed that the degree of difficulty of the dives she performed were the same as many of the High School divers. When she was 14, around 1978, she moved to Mission Viejo, California to train under Hall of Fame coach Ron O'Brien, of the Mission Viejo Nadadores Diving Team, a nationally recognized program, where Wendy attended Mission Viejo High School, graduating in 1983. She lived with several foster families during her time in Mission Viejo.

In her career, Wyland was a five-time national champion in the 10-meter platform.

Gaining recognition at the 1982 World Aquatic Championships in Guayacil, Ecuador, she captured gold in the 10-meter platform. At the 1983 Pan American Games in Caracas, Venezuela, in one of her best-known performances, she took a gold medal in platform diving and won silver in 3-meter springboard diving. She won a bronze in the 1983 Universiade in Edmonton, Canada, in 10-meter Platform diving behind Lu Wei and Zhou Jihong of the Chinese team.

== 1984 Olympic bronze ==
More commonly known as Wendy Wyland, she represented her native country at the 1984 Summer Olympics in Los Angeles, California, winning the bronze medal in the Women's 10m Platform competition. She finished behind gold medalist Zhou Jihong of China and Michele Mitchell of the United States, with whom she had trained at Mission Bay Divers. Mitchell took the silver medal. China's Chen Xiaoxia was considered a favorite for the gold, and led throughout the fifth dive, but faltered on her sixth dive which was a pike with a very high degree of difficulty, and dropped to third place, and would later drop to fourth. Xiaoxia had experienced difficulty maintaining her composure and had earlier finished out of medal contention behind Wyland at the 1982 World Championships where Wyland had taken the gold medal. Wyland's U.S. Olympic teammate Michelle Mitchell had unexpectedly won the U.S. Olympic trials in the 10-meter platform that year.

After the 1984 Olympics, Wyland would win a bronze in Platform diving in 1986 at the World Championships in Madrid. She began experiencing shoulder problems in the 1985 season.

== Mission Bay divers ==
In 1984, Wyland briefly studied broadcast journalism at the University of Southern California. After moving to Florida in the fall of 1985, she attended Florida Atlantic University at Boca Raton, Florida, where she trained for the 1988 Olympics with the Mission Bay Makos Diving Team under her former coach Ron O'Brien who had left Mission Viejo to coach Mission Bay's team. With the Mission Bay Makos, she trained alongside outstanding fellow divers Greg Louganis, Michele Mitchell and Kent Ferguson. Prior to the new, large, and very modern Mission Aquatics Center opening in May, 1986, Wyland trained at the aquatics center at Florida Atlantic. Wyland had reconstructive shoulder surgery in late 1987, which may have affected her ability to qualify for the 1988 Olympics, though she recovered after a five month layoff and continued to train and compete. She had a second shoulder surgery in the late eighties broke a hand and thumb, and later had over sixty stitches in her leg from a fall in a locker room. Despite her injuries, after recovering she continued to compete at a high level. Wyland graduated Florida Atlantic in the summer of 1989 with a communications degree.

=== 1988 Olympic trials ===
In a disappointing turn of events in the 1988 August Olympic trials in Indianapolis, Wyland just missed the United States team, finishing third in Platform diving. In a close contest, Wyland would have been selected if only the diving from Saturday, August 27 had been tabulated in the final scoring, but under new rules the previous days' preliminary diving round for Friday, August 26, was also included, placing her third instead of in a tie for first with Michele Mitchell.

Weyland retired from diving in May 1990 after finishing fourth in Platform Diving in the Alamo International Championship at the Mission Bay Aquatic Center. She was a Senior at Florida Atlantic University that year. Though still performing well, she had placed second in the three meter springboard and platform diving events at the U.S. Indoor Championships.

=== Post-swimming professions ===
Wyland later completed a Masters Degree from the University of Texas around 1995. She moved back to Rochester, New York in the mid-1990s, where she soon took a position as the director of development and public relations at Continuing Development Services, a firm that helped Rochester residents struggling with disabilities. She ran the Webster Aquatic Center and then was the head swimming and diving coach and pool manager at Rochester Institute of Technology.

Wyland was engaged to Chad Anthony Lucero, brother of an Olympic diver, in May 1990, and had planned to marry in June of that year. She married David van der Woude around 1999, obtaining her marriage license in March, 2000 with whom she had one child born in September, 2000.

=== Death ===
Wyland suffered from migraine headaches and dizzy spells for 22 months before her death. After feeling poorly on the way to work at Rochester Technical Institute, she died at 5:00 pm during sleep in Webster, New York on September 27, 2003, at Rochester General Hospital, after being taken there. An autopsy was performed but was inconclusive about cause of death, though a brain aneurysm was later considered as a cause. An annual competition, The Wendy Wyland Invitational, bears her name in memorial. She was survived by her husband David VanDerWoude, her stepdaughter Carley, and daughter Abigayle. She was buried in the Webster Union Cemetery, Webster, New York. Her husband established the Wendy Wyland Scholarship Fund for divers in financial need of college scholarships. She had experienced headaches as early as 1989 while still a diving competitor, and had been diagnosed with a strong viral infection at the time.

=== Honors ===
Wyland was Swimming World magazine's World Platform Diver of the Year in 1982 and 1983. She was included in People magazine's "50 most beautiful people" in 1990 and was inducted into the International Swimming Hall of Fame in 2001.

At 12, she was nominated for Rochester's Amateur Athlete of the Year for 1978, for her National Championship diving titles. In June 2000, she was inducted into Rochester, New York's Frontier Field Walk of Fame. Frontier field was a local baseball stadium for Rochester's Red Wings team.

== See also ==
- List of members of the International Swimming Hall of Fame
