= Russ Bertram =

American swimming coach

Biographical details
- Born: July 12, 1965 (age 61); Indianapolis, Indiana
- Height: 5 ft 6 in (168 cm)
- Education: Indiana University Bloomington

Playing career
- 1985-1989: Indiana University Bloomington; Coach Hobie Billingsley
- Positions: Diver, platform, springboard

Coaching career (HC unless noted)
- 2013-: Denison University
- 2006-2013: University of Arizona; Coach, Aquatics Director
- 2002-2005: Events Dir, US Diving
- 1999-2002: Mission Viejo Nadadores
- 1998-1999: Florida State University

Accomplishments and honors

Championships
- National Team Titles (Mission Viejo) 1999-02; NCAA Div. III Men's Nat. Team Champions 2016, 2018, 2019 (Denison University)

Awards
- CSCAA Coach of the Century 2021; 3 x NCAA Div. III Men's Coach of the Year; 9 x North Coast Athletic Conf. Coach of Year (Denison University); Phil Boggs Award (2021)

Russ Bertram was a diving coach who competed as a diver while at Indiana University, and acted as a head coach for the University of Arizona from 2006-2013, and for Denison University after 2013. He received the Phil Boggs award in 2021 from USA Diving for his contribution to the sport. During Bertram's tenure, the Denison Swim and Dive Team won the National NCAA Division III Championship in 2016, 2018 and 2019.

== Early life and diving ==
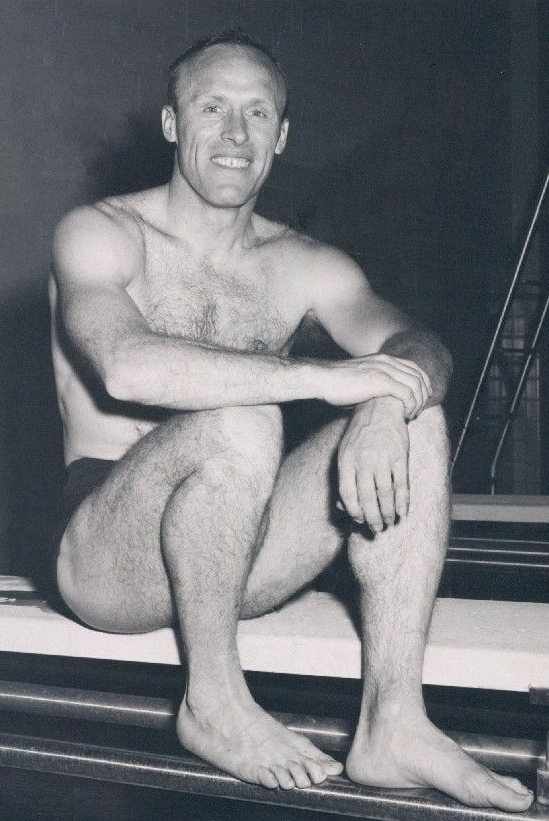
Coach H. Billingsley as young diver, 1963

Bertram was born on July 12, 1965, in Indianapolis, Indiana, and graduated Perry Meridian High School in Indianapolis. He attended Indiana University Bloomington from 1985-1989, graduating in 1989 with a degree in Operations and Systems Management. While competing with the Indiana Swimming team, he placed second in 3-meter diving in a winning meet against Wisconsin in late October, 1987. He performed well at many meets as an independent diver during his summers at Indiana, placing first in both the one and three-meter springboard at the Midwest Invitational Championships on July 3, 1986. While at the University he was managed by Hall of Fame Diving Coach Hobie Billingsley, a 1945 NCAA Championship diver from Ohio State.

== Diving career highlights ==
After graduating from Indiana, Bertram captured five United States diving national championships in the 3-meter springboard and the 10-meter platform. His platform championships consisted of gold medals in the 10-meter platform in both the 1993 and 1995 U.S. National Indoor Championships. He won his third 10-meter Platform championship at the August, 1996 Phillips 66 Outdoor Diving National Championships in Moultrie, Georgia, as the oldest competitor at 31. Bertram hoped to qualify for the 1996 Olympics but suffered from a dislocated shoulder injury at a meet in Germany in March 1995 after an awkwardly executed armstand backward triple somersault tuck caused him to strike his shoulder hard upon entering the water at the end of his dive. He was forced to take off the remainder of the 1995 season to recover. Continuing to dive after recovering, in international competition, Bertram won a bronze in the 1-meter springboard on October 1, 1997 at the 1997 FINA Diving Grand Prix in New Zealand, and a silver in the 10-meter platform.

Bertram competed in the June, 1996 Olympic Diving Trials in Indianapolis, Indiana. In his trial final, he finished sixth in the 10-meter platform, failing to make the U.S. team. While training for the Olympics, he was managed by Ron O'Brien at the Fort Lauderdale Diving Team. In his peak training period, he weighed 145, at a height of 5' 6", trained six hours a day, six days a week, and included ballet and kick-boxing in his regiment.

== Coaching career ==
In 1989 while at Ohio State University, Bertram began his coaching career as a graduate assistant diving coach for an Ohio State squad that featured six Olympians and 10 U.S. National Champions.

From 1998-1999, Bertram was the head diving coach at Florida State University, and was head dive coach for the Mission Viejo Nadadores, an exceptional youth program, from 1999-2000. From 2002-05 Bertram was the national events director for Indianapolis-based United States Diving. He served as a team administrator for the 2000 and 2004 Olympic Games, and served as a judge at the 2008 Olympic trials. He continued to work as a diving judge through much of his career.

=== University of Arizona ===
Bertram served with the University of Arizona from 2006-2013, where he acted as Aquatics Director, and managed all aspects of a swim and dive center that included a 50-meter competitive swimming pool, a smaller deep well, and a larger deep well for water polo and competitive diving. He also served as the program director for Arizona's Swimming and Diving teams. In 2010 while at the University of Arizona, he received the prestigious Phil Boggs Award from USA Diving for a lifetime commitment to the sport. In 2010, Bertram helped host three major successful championships on the Arizona campus. These included the USA Diving Junior National Championship, the Championship for FINA World Junior Diving, and the Championship for USA National Diving Age Group competition.

=== Denison University Dive Coach ===
Bertram was a dive coach for both the men's and women's teams at Denison University after 2013, where as of 2024, he was voted an NCAA Division III Men's Coach of the Year three times, and a North Coast Athletic Conference Coach of the Year nine times. In 2014-2015, Bertram won back-to-back national coach of the year awards for qualifying and sending 21 of his men's divers to the NCAA Regional competition in a three-year period. In 2014, one of his men's divers, Max Levy, was named the Division III Diver of the Year, helping to secure Denison a second-place NCAA team finish. In all, at Denison, Bertram has coached three of his male divers to national championship performances, including Max Levy, Ben Lewis, and Connor Dignan.

Gaining national recognition during Bertram's tenure as Dive Coach, under Head Swim Coach Greg Parini, Denison Men's Swim and Dive Team were NCAA Division III national champions in 2016 in Greensboro, North Carolina, in 2018 in Indianapolis, and in 2019 again in Greensboro. They placed second in the NCAA championship in three successive years from 2013-2015.
