= Tony Iglesias =

Bolivian diver

Personal information
- Nationality: Bolivian
- Born: 24 December 1972 (age 53)

Sport
- Sport: Diving
- Event(s): springboard, platform diving
- College team: Southern Methodist University
- Coached by: Jim Stillson (SMU)

Tony Iglesias (born 24 December 1972) was a Bolivian former diver who competed for Southern Methodist University, and participated in two diving events at the 1996 Summer Olympics in Atlanta.

Gaining recognition on the State level as a High School diver for Houston's Cougar Divers in the 16-18 year old age category, he placed third in the 1-meter board, and second in the three meter board at the 1988 Texas Age Group Diving Indoor Championships at Fort Worth's Texas Christian University in April 1988. At the All American Invitational in Austin, Texas, in January, 1989, he swam for Cougar Divers, an age group team, and placed 13th on the 3-meter board, a quality performance for a highly competitive national meet. Iglesias also performed well in the Jr. Olympic Zone Championships placing third in Boy's Platform diving in July 1989 in Austin, Texas.

== Diving for Southern Methodist University ==
Iglesias attended and dove for Southern Methodist University in Dallas, Texas, where he specialized in springboard diving. At SMU, he was mentored and trained with long-serving diving Coach Jim Stillson, an All American diver for Ohio State University, and a former diving coach for Columbia University. As a world class diver, he was a major points contributor to the swimming and diving team at SMU. In his early collegiate career, at the Southwest Conference Relays at College Station in October, 1990, he placed third in third in the 3-meter board, but first in the 1-meter board. Excelling in 1-meter and 3-meter springboard diving, he won both at a dual meet with Kansas in October 1991, leading SMU to a win. He again placed first in 1-meter diving at a dual meet with TCU in December 1993, leading SMU to a win.

== International competition ==
In March, 1995, Iglesias attended in the 12th Pan American Games in Argentina, competing in the 1 and 3-meter springboard, and the 10-meter platform.

=== 1996 Olympics ===
Diving for Bolivia at the 1996 Atlanta Olympics, in fierce global competition he placed 27th in Men's springboard diving, and 30th in Men's Platform diving.
