= Dave Burgering =

Olympic diver

Personal information
- Born: Lansing, Michigan, United States

Sport
- Sport: Diving
Medal record
Representing United States
Pan American Games
Bronze medal – third place	1983 Caracas	3m springboard

Dave Burgering is a US Olympic team diver, Fort Lauderdale dive team diving director, and head coach. Burgering began diving at an early age, and his career included collegiate diving at Michigan State University. He was part of the US team selected for the 1980 Olympic Games. However, he was unable to compete that year because the United States led a boycott of the Olympics in response to the Soviet invasion of Afghanistan. He has been coaching for 32 years, including attending the 2008 Olympic Games as a part of the coaching staff.

== Career ==
Burgering started diving in 1967 and finished his career in 1984. He first coached for the Missions Viejo Nadadores as a head coach, where his team won two National Team titles in 1987 and 1988. He then coached in Boca Raton, Florida for the Mission Bay Makos, where his team beat his former team by one point in the national championship. He is now the head coach of Fort Lauderdale Diving Team and has been coaching there since 2007.

As of 2023, he has coached 1,173 junior American finalists and 51 senior American finalists.
