= Vince Panzano =

American diving coach (born 1951)

- Panzano, early 20's circa 1973

Biographical details
- Born: c. 1951 (age 74–75); King of Prussia, Pennsylvania
- Education: Ohio State University

Playing career
- 1969-1973: Ohio State University
- Positions: Diver; Coached by Ron O'Brien

Coaching career (HC unless noted)
- 1973-1978: University of Tennessee; Diving Coach
- 1978-2013: Ohio State University; Diving Coach
- 1984, 1988 1996, 2012: U.S. Olympic Diving Coach

Accomplishments and honors

Championships
- 6 National Team Titles (McDonald's Diving)(Ohio State)

Awards
- 4 x NCAA Diving Coach of the Year; 10 x Big 10 Diving Coach of the Year

Vince Panzano (born c. 1951) is an American former competition diver for Ohio State University, who coached the Ohio State University diving team for thirty-five years from 1978 through 2013. Panzano was a ten-time Big 10 and four-time NCAA Diving Coach of the Year who coached teams that won six national titles. Well recognized on the international stage, he served as an Olympic diving coach in the 1984 Los Angeles Olympics, the 1988 Seoul Olympics, the 1996 Atlanta Olympics, and most recently the 2012 London Olympics.

== Education ==
Panzano was born in King of Prussia, Pennsylvania, where he attended nearby Upper Merion High School, and as a multi-sport athlete competed as a diver on the swim team and was a high-jumper and pole-vaulter on the track team. In March 1967 at the Pennsylvania State Championships at the Bucknell Pool in Lewisburg, he placed fifth overall, a solid performance for a high school underclassman. In March, 1968, Panzano placed third diving in the Pennsylvania Boy's High School State Championship in Lewisburg, Pennsylvania.

He attended Ohio State from 1969 to 1973, where he dove competitively for Coach Ron O'Brien. In his Senior year, he helped O'Brien coach the diving team. During college, Panzano gained additional coaching experience from working at summer camps including the Ron O'Brien Diving School in Columbus, Ohio.

== Coaching ==
=== Tennessee ===
Panzano coached diving at the University of Tennessee from 1973 through 1978 immediately after graduating Ohio State, replacing former diving coach Bill Ferry. In his first summer at Tennessee in 1973, he worked as a coach at their All-sports camp in June. At Tennessee, Panzano was mentored by Hall of Fame Head Swim Coach Ray Bussard, and his teams produced at least one Southeastern Conference Champion in each of the five years he coached. As an indication of his improvement as a young coach, and the regional recognition of his diving program, he was named SEC Diving Coach of the Year in 1977 after only four years coaching Tennessee. Panzano acknowledged how his skills had grown under Bussard, noting, "I've learned what coaching is about through him".

=== Ohio State ===
He was hired to coach at Ohio State University in 1978 where he remained through his retirement on August 5, 2013. His thirty-five years of service was the longest tenured coaching position at Ohio State at that time. During his lengthy coaching career he excelled on the national stage and led Ohio State and McDonald's Diving, an age group team, to six national team titles. Demonstrating the excellence of his program at Ohio State, he developed two Olympic medalists, 13 NCAA champions, 23 U.S. national diving champions and 59 Big Ten champions. He also coached an exceptional 92 All-Americans.

Outstanding Ohio State divers coached by Panzano include 1996, and 2000 Olympian David Pichler, 1988 and 1996 Olympian Patrick Jeffrey, Laura Profumo, Kim Fugett, Carrier Finneran, 1976 Olympian Kent Vosler, who coached diving, 1992 Olympian and Ithaca College diving coach Karen LaFace, 1984 and 1988 Olympic silver and bronze medalist and coach Kelly McCormick, and 1988 Olympian Mark Bradshaw, who has served as the diving coach at Arizona State University.

== Service to the diving community ==
Aside from coaching, Panzano directed the meet for the 1976 Olympic trials. In 1980, he helped host the first diving meet of America against China at his alma mater, Ohio State. The following year he helped host the U.S. Diving Championships at Ohio State. He worked with the board of directors of United States Diving, and the United States Diving International/Olympic Committee. A prestigious and important post, he also served with the NCAA Swimming and Diving Rules Committee.

=== Honors ===
To recognize him as U.S. Diving's outstanding coach, Panzano has been awarded the "Mike Peppe Award," on two occasions. Peppe was one of Ohio State's longest serving, and most distinguished swimming coaches. A prestigious honor due to its national scope, he was also chosen four times as the NCAA Diving Coach of the Year. In 1996, Panzano was inducted into Ohio State University's Athletics Hall of Fame.
