= Eric Marcus =

American journalist, podcast producer and non-fiction writer

- Born: November 12, 1958 (age 67); New York City, New York, U.S.
- Education: Vassar College (AB); Columbia University (MA, MS)
- Occupations: Journalist, podcast producer, nonfiction writer

Eric Marcus (born November 12, 1958, New York City) is an American journalist, podcast producer, and non-fiction writer. He is the founder and host of the Making Gay History podcast, which brings LGBT history to life through the voices of the people who lived it, and he is co-producer of Those Who Were There: Voices from the Holocaust, a podcast drawn from the Fortunoff Video Archive for Holocaust Testimonies at Yale University. His books are primarily of LGBT interest, including Breaking the Surface, the autobiography of gay Olympic diving champion Greg Louganis, which became a #1 New York Times best seller and Making History: The Struggle for Gay and Lesbian Equal Rights, 1945–1990, which won the Stonewall Book Award. He is also the author of Why Suicide? Questions and Answers about Suicide, Suicide Prevention, and Coping with the Suicide of Someone You Know. He has written for a range of publications including The New York Times, Time, Newsweek, the New York Daily News, and the New York Post.

== Background ==
Marcus received his A.B. from Vassar College in 1980 where he majored in urban studies. He earned his master's degree from Columbia University Graduate School of Journalism in 1984 and a master's degree in real estate development in 2003, also from Columbia University. He was an associate producer for Good Morning America and CBS Morning News.

Between 2010 and 2014, Marcus served on the board of the American Foundation for Suicide Prevention (ASFP).

== Filmography ==
Year	Title	Production Company	Role
2010	Stonewall Uprising	PBS American Experience	Associate Producer
2019	Stonewall: The Making of a Monument	The New York Times Op-Doc	Producer
2020	The Last Time I Saw Them	Fortunoff Video Archive for Holocaust Testimonies	Co-Producer

== Honors ==
The award-winning Making Gay History podcast has received critical recognition from a variety of sources. Eric Marcus has been interviewed by numerous media outlets, including on several occasions by NPR, including on All Things Considered about the podcast's “Nazi Era” season, which premiered in 2025, and for Making Gay History’s episode on Civil Rights pioneer Bayard Rustin. PodRanker named Making Gay History the best queer history podcast of 2026. The Atlantic also ranked the podcast’s 2021 season, “Coming of Age During the AIDS Crisis,” among the 50 best podcasts of 2021.

== Works ==
- The Male Couple's Guide: Finding a Man, Making a Home, Building a Life (HarperCollins, 1988, 1992, 1999)
- Making History: The Struggle for Gay and Lesbian Equal Rights, 1945 to 1990 (HarperCollins, 1992)
- Expect the Worst (You Won't Be Disappointed) (HarperSF, 1992)
- Is It a Choice? Answers to 300 of the Most Frequently Asked Questions about Gay & Lesbian People (HarperOne, 1993, 1999, 2005)
- Breaking the Surface: The Greg Louganis Story (Random House, 1995; Plume, 1996)
- Icebreaker: The Autobiography of U.S. Figure Skating Champion Rudy Galindo (Pocket Books, 1997)
- Together Forever: Gay & Lesbian Couples Share Their Secrets for Lasting Happiness (Anchor Books, 1998, 1999)
- Making Gay History: The Half-Century Fight for Lesbian & Gay Equal Rights (HarperCollins, 2002)
- Pessimisms: Famous (and Not So Famous) Observations, Quotations, Thoughts, and Ruminations on What to Expect When You’re Expecting the Worst (Anova Books, 2007)
- What If? Answers to Questions about What It Means to Be Gay and Lesbian (Simon Pulse, September 2007)
- Why Suicide? Questions & Answers about Suicide, Suicide Prevention, and Coping with the Suicide of Someone You Know (HarperOne, 2010)

== See also ==
- LGBT culture in New York City
- List of LGBT people from New York City
- NYC Pride March
