= Ron O'Brien (diver) =

American diving coach (1938–2024)

Biographical details
- Born: March 14, 1938; Pittsburgh, Pennsylvania, US
- Died: November 19, 2024 (aged 86); Naples, Florida, US
- Education: Ohio State University BA 1959; M.A. '61 PHd '67 OSU; Physical Education

Playing career
- 1955-1959: Ohio State University; Mike Peppe, Coach
- Positions: Gymnastics; Diver (1, 3-meter board)

Coaching career (HC unless noted)
- 1962-1963: University of Minnesota
- 1963-1978: Ohio State University
- 1978-1985: Mission Viejo Nadadores
- 1978-1990: Mission Bay Divers; Boca Raton, FL.
- 1990-1996: Hall of Fame Divers; Fort Lauderdale, FL
- 1968-1996: U.S. Olympic Dive Team

Accomplishments and honors

Championships
- 38 U.S. Diving team titles (Mission Viejo); 16 U.S. Diving team titles (Mission Bay Divers); 20 U.S. Diving team titles (Ft. Lauderdale)

Awards
- Ohio State Athletics HOF 1984; International Swimming HOF 1988; US Olympic Hall of Fame 2019

Ronald Shay O'Brien (March 14, 1938 – November 19, 2024) was a Hall of Fame American diving coach and author who dove for Ohio State University. He was the head diving coach at Ohio State from 1963 to 1978, later coaching the Mission Viejo Nadadores from 1978 to 1985, the Mission Bay Divers of Boca Raton from 1985 to 1990, and the City of Fort Lauderdale Diving Team from 1990 to 1996 . He coached diving for the U.S. Olympic team for eight successive Olympics from 1968 to 1996 and coached Olympic champion Greg Louganis and future Ohio State Diving Coach Vince Panzano. The seven Olympic medalists he coached won five gold, three silver, and four bronze medals.

== Early life and athletic career ==
O'Brien was born in Pittsburgh, Pennsylvania on March 14, 1938, to Paul O'Brien, a firefighter, and Helen Shay, a homemaker. He began his athletic career as a diver at the YMCA of Pittsburgh, Pennsylvania, and attended David B. Oliver High School in Pittsburgh's northside area, where he swam and dove throughout his years at the school.

=== High school era diving ===
In his Senior year, he decided to concentrate exclusively on diving because he believed at 5' 5" he was too short to excel as a swimmer, aware that taller swimmers had a slight advantage. Competing for Oliver in late February 1955, he placed first in diving at the City Championship meet to qualify for the Western Regional Meet the following week. Competing for Oliver High School at the Pennsylvania Interscholastic Athletic Association State High School Swimming Championships, he placed second in diving on March 12, 1955, in University Park, Pennsylvania, though his team finished 8th overall.

Just out of high school, at the early August, 1956 Olympic diving trials at the Brennan Pools in Detroit, O'Brien placed 12th in the finals of the three-meter springboard event, and was not selected for the U.S. team. Two more experienced Ohio State divers Don Harper and Glen Whitten placed first and second. O'Brien placed eleventh in 10-meter platform diving with Gary Tobian taking first place. Only the top three qualified for the U.S. team.

== Ohio State University diver ==
As a diver at Ohio State University, under Hall of Fame Head Swimming and Diving Coach Mike Peppe, he earned a total of six varsity letters in diving and gymnastics. He was the NCAA national champion on 1 meter springboard in 1959. After completing his undergraduate studies, he was an AAU national champion on the 3 meter springboard in 1961. He earned All-America honors at Ohio State for his achievements on the one and three meter boards.

The Ohio State Swimming and Diving Team placed second to Michigan at the 1959 NCAA swimming and diving championships in Ithaca, New York, where O'Brien placed first in the 1-meter diving competition and Ohio State diver Sam Hall, a 1960 Silver medalist in springboard diving, placed first on the 3-meter board. He graduated Ohio State in 1959 with a B.A. degree in Physical Education, later earning his master's in 1961 from the university in the same field. In 1967, he earned a Phd. in Physical Education from Ohio State. After his college career, he worked as a performer in a professional water stunt show alongside fellow dive coach Dick Kimball.

Moving up in the national rankings for platform diving after competing at Ohio State, O'Brien placed fourth in 10-meter platform diving at the AAU Men's Outdoor Swimming and Diving Championships on July 25, 1960, prior to the Olympic trials.

=== 1960 Olympic trials ===
Continuing to compete at a high level after completing his B.A. from Ohio State, in 1960 he placed third in platform diving on August 5, at the U.S. Olympic Trials in Detroit with 154.7 points, around 5 points from seriously challenging for the Olympic berth from former 1956 Olympic Silver medalist in 10-meter platform diving, Gary Tobian who scored 159.69 points. Bob Webster of Michigan University won the platform diving trial in Detroit with 166.56 points. A stiff competitor, Webster would win the gold medal in 10-meter platform diving at the 1960 Rome Olympics.

Earlier, on August 2, O'Brien placed fourth in springboard diving finishing behind first place Sam Hall, a fellow Ohio State diver and future 1960 silver medalist in springboard diving, second place Gary Tobian, and third place Donald Harper, a fellow Ohio State diver and former 1956 Olympic silver medalist in the 3-meter springboard. The springboard dive scoring was very close after Sam Hall's first place 170.37 points. Unfortunately, in both events his score just missed the top two places required to qualify for the August Rome Olympic Games. O'Brien was disappointed in coming so close to making the U.S. team, but believed it helped later motivate him to work harder as a dive coach.

== Coaching career ==
After his time as an athlete ended, O'Brien started a career in coaching, while simultaneously pursuing graduate studies. He began with a brief stint as a Diving Coach at the University of Minnesota from 1962 to 1963.

=== Ohio State coach ===
He served as the head diving coach at his alma mater, the Ohio State University where he remained from 1963 to 1978. While coaching at Ohio State, his divers captured eight men's NCAA titles in the two available springboard events, consisting of five consecutive titles between 1971 and 1975 on the 3-meter board from three different divers. While in Columbus, he coached Olympic diver Jenny Chandler with his youth program, the Ron O'Brien Diving School.

He took a coaching job in Southern California in 1978, where he became head coach of the Mission Viejo Nadadores, where he remained through 1985. While at the Nadadores, his divers won an exceptional 38 team titles in wide array of meets and tournaments. O'Brien's divers from Mission Viejo won all four of the gold medals in the 1982 World Championships. No coach's dive team had ever taken all four medals in a World Diving Championship.

In 1985, O'Brien headed to South Florida to coach at the new Mission Bay facility in Boca Raton, where he remained until 1990. Among his more accomplished divers at Mission Bay, he coached Wendy Wyland, a 1984 Bronze Olympic medalist in the 10-meter Platform. O'Brien also coached By 1986, O'Brien's Mission Bay divers won all 12 United States Diving individual National Titles, and 16 team titles.

=== City of Fort Lauderdale ===
After leaving Mission Bay divers in 1990, the City of Fort Lauderdale employed O'Brien as their head diving coach and director at the Aquatic Complex at Fort Lauderdale's Hall of Fame. O'Brien captured 20 team titles during his coaching tenure at Mission Bay. Most of his Mission Bay divers competed in the Olympic Games in 1992 and 1996, while O'Brien served as head coach. His Fort Lauderdale diver Russ Bertram trained with him for the 1996 Olympic trials, and who would later have an accomplished career as an Olympic and collegiate dive coach with the University of Arizona from 2006 to 2013, and with Denison University after 2013. At the end of his tenure with the Fort Lauderdale team in 1996, he retired from coaching.

Over the years, he has coached divers of all skill levels, resulting in over 350 medals in elite dive meets all over the world. One of his more accomplished divers at Ohio State, Vince Panzano, would later coach the Buckeyes from 1978 to 2013. In international competition, O'Brien served as a USA Olympic coach at 8 Olympic Games from 1968 to 1996. Olympians coached by O'Brien have won five gold, three silver, and four bronze medals. O'Brien holds the record for producing at least one national champion in the most consecutive years, with a 23-year streak from 1973 to 1995. In 1982, O'Brien's California divers took all four of the available gold medals at the world championships.

In international competition outside the Olympics, O'Brien also served as a World Cup coach seven times, was a seven-time World Championship coach and served as a Pan American Games coach four times.

=== Olympians coached ===
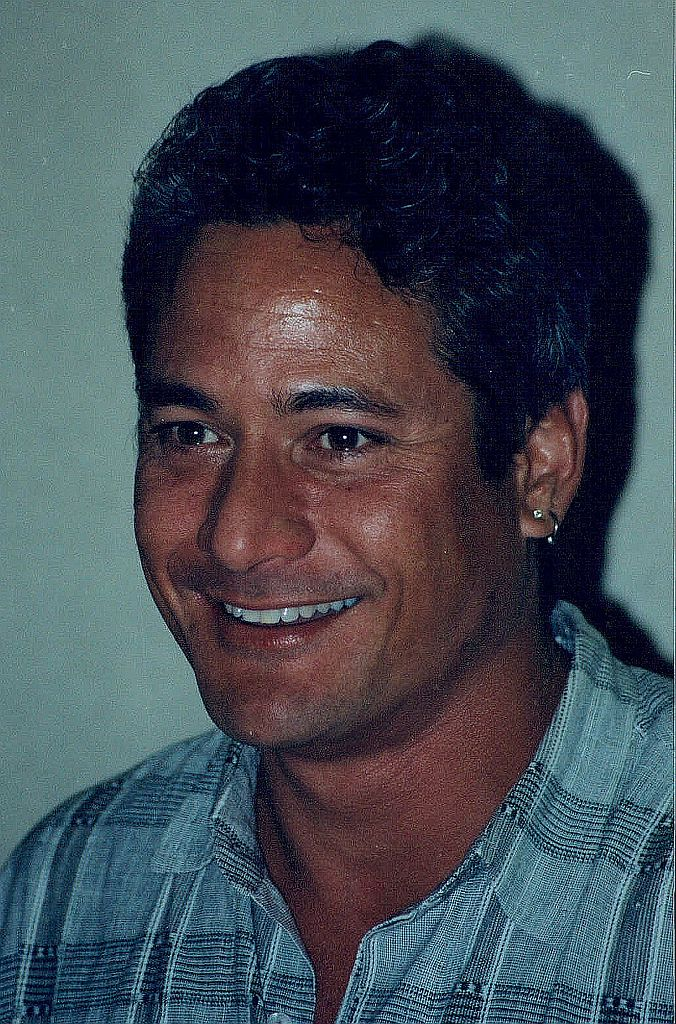
Louganis, 1995

O'Brien's Olympic medalists included 3-meter springboard gold medalist Jennifer Chandler and 10-meter platform bronze medalist Debbie Keplar Wilson in the 1976 Games. He coached two-time 10-meter platform silver medalist Michele Mitchell who was an Olympian in both 1984 and 1988, and 1984 10-meter platform bronze medalist Wendy Wyland. He coached 10-meter platform silver medalist Scott Donie who medaled in 1992 and two-time 10-meter platform bronze medalist Mary Ellen Clark who competed in both the 1992 and 1996 Olympics. Greg Louganis, his best known Olympic medalist competed in diving in the 1984 and 1988 Olympics.

As an actor, O'Brien appeared on the Tonight Show With Johnny Carson in 1962, Yarns From Pigeon Inlet in 1979, and Back on Board: Greg Louganis in 2014.

== Retirement and death ==
After retiring from coaching in 1996, O'Brien continued as the national technical director for USA Diving where he served from 1991 to 2004. He served as USA Diving's High Performance Director from 2004 until his retirement in 2008. He lived in Islamorada, Florida, with his wife.

O'Brien died on November 19, 2024, at his home in Naples, Florida at the age of 86. He was survived by his wife of over 60 years, the former Mary Jane Tollerton, a daughter, son and four grandchildren. His son was a 2000 U.S. Olympic Diving Team coach.

== Publications ==
O'Brien produced a video, Diving My Way. The video teaches techniques and body alignment using slow motion and other effects.

O'Brien also authored the book, Diving for Gold. Diving for Gold discusses mechanics for dives on the one-meter, and three-meter board, and the platform. It discusses O'Brien's philosophy on how divers can acquire the most a more effective mental approach to the sport.

== Honors and awards ==
O'Brien was the recipient of the "Outstanding Senior US Diving Coach Award" fourteen times.

He was one of the few diving coaches in the US Olympic Hall of Fame, when he was admitted in 2019. He was an inductee of the Ohio State Athletics Hall of Fame in 1984 and The International Swimming Hall of Fame in 1988. He was elected to the Pennsylvania Sports Hall of Fame in his native state. Because of his history as both an athlete and coach at Ohio State, the school's diving well was named in his honor.

He was awarded the Mike Peppe Memorial Award 14 times as USA Diving Coach of the year, with his first instance in 1979, and his last time upon his year of retirement in 1996. He received the WHOSAM Award in 1993, for commitment to excellence and dedication in diving. He won the United States Olympic Committee's Diving Coach of the Year in 1996, and the Phil Boggs Award, presented for outstanding contributions to United States Diving.

He was a multi-year recipient of the Mike Pepper Award from 1979 to 1987, won the Malone Memorial Award in 1974, and in 1976 was presented with the Fred Cady Award.

== See also ==
- List of members of the International Swimming Hall of Fame
